= 2012 MTV Video Music Awards Japan =

- Date: June 23, 2012
- Location: Makuhari Messe
- Hosted by: Perfume

Television/radio coverage
- Network: MTV Japan

The 2012 MTV Video Music Awards Japan was held in Chiba on June 23, 2012, at the Makuhari Messe and was hosted by Japanese trio Perfume. The nominees were announced on March 21, 2012.

== Awards ==
=== Video of the Year ===
Exile — "Rising Sun"

- Lady Gaga — "You and I"
- Red Hot Chili Peppers — "The Adventures of Rain Dance Maggie"
- Girls' Generation — "Mr. Taxi"
- Tokyo Jihen — "Kon'ya wa Karasawagi"

=== Album of the Year ===
Girls' Generation — Girls' Generation

- Coldplay — Mylo Xyloto
- Juju — You
- Kara — Super Girl
- Lady Gaga — Born This Way

=== Best Male Video ===
Bruno Mars — "It Will Rain"

- David Guetta (featuring Flo Rida and Nicki Minaj) — "Where Them Girls At"
- Gen Hoshino — "Film"
- Justin Bieber — "Mistletoe"
- Naoto Inti Raymi — "Brave"

=== Best Female Video ===
Namie Amuro — "Love Story"

- Ayaka — "Hajimari no Toki"
- Björk — "Crystalline"
- Kana Nishino — "Tatoe Donnani..."
- Rihanna featuring Calvin Harris — "We Found Love"

=== Best Group Video ===
2PM — "I'm Your Man"

- Coldplay — "Paradise"
- Ikimonogakari — "Itsudatte Bokura Wa"
- Maroon 5 featuring Christina Aguilera — "Moves Like Jagger"
- Monkey Majik — "Hero"

=== Best New Artist ===
2NE1 — "I Am The Best"

- CN Blue — "In My Head"
- James Blake — "Limit to Your Love"
- Kyary Pamyu Pamyu — "Tsukema Tsukeru"
- LMFAO — "Party Rock Anthem"

=== Best Rock Video ===
One Ok Rock — "Answer Is Near"

- Bon Iver — "Holocene"
- Radwimps — "Kimi to Hitsuji to Ao"
- Red Hot Chili Peppers — "The Adventures of Rain Dance Maggie"
- Sakanaction — "Bach no Senritsu o Yoru ni Kiita Sei Desu."

=== Best Pop Video ===
Sandaime J Soul Brothers — "Fighters"

- Namie Amuro — "Naked"
- Beyoncé — "Run the World (Girls)"
- Ikimono-gakari — "Itsudatte Bokura Wa"
- Rihanna featuring Calvin Harris — "We Found Love"

=== Best R&B Video ===
Miliyah Kato — "Yūsha-Tachi"

- Ai — "Independent Woman"
- Amy Winehouse — "Our Day Will Come"
- Jason Derülo — "It Girl"
- Mayer Hawthorne — "The Walk"

=== Best Hip-Hop Video ===
Kreva — "Kijun"

- Drake — "Headlines"
- Jay-Z & Kanye West featuring Otis Redding — "Otis"
- Sick Team — "Street Wars"
- Tyler, The Creator — "Yonkers"

=== Best Reggae Video ===
Sean Paul — "She Doesn't Mind"

- Arare — "Your Puzzle"
- Pushim — "Messenger"
- SuperHeavy — "Miracle Worker"
- The Heavymanners featuring Rumi — "Breath for Speaker"

=== Best Dance Video ===
Perfume — "Laser Beam"

- David Guetta featuring Flo Rida and Nicki Minaj — "Where Them Girls At"
- James Blake — "Limit to Your Love"
- SBTRKT — "Pharaohs"
- Etsuko Yakushimaru & D.V.D. — "Gurugle Earth"

=== Best Video from a Film ===
Bump of Chicken — "Good Luck" (from Always Sanchōme no Yūhi '64)

- Bruno Mars — "It Will Rain" (from The Twilight Saga: Breaking Dawn – Part 1)
- Foo Fighters — "Walk" (from Thor)
- Ziyoou-Vachi — "Disco" (from Moteki)
- Superfly — "Ai wo Kurae" (from Smuggler)

=== Best Collaboration ===
Namie Amuro featuring After School — "Make It Happen"

- Jay-Z & Kanye West featuring Otis Redding — "Otis"
- Miliyah Kato x Shota Shimizu — "Believe"
- Maroon 5 featuring Christina Aguilera — "Moves Like Jagger"
- Special Others and Kj — "Sailin'"

=== Best Choreography ===
Perfume — "Laser Beam" (choreography by Mikiko)

- Beyoncé — "Run the World (Girls)" (choreography by Frank Gatson, Sheryl Murakami and Jeffrey Page)
- Chris Brown — "Yeah 3x"
- LMFAO — "Party Rock Anthem" (choreography by Hokuto Konishi)
- Shinee — "Lucifer" (choreography by Rino Okinawa and Jaewon Dancing)

=== Best Karaokee! Song ===
Sonar Pocket — "365 Nichi no Love Story."

- Ayaka — "Hajimari no Toki"
- Che'Nelle — "Baby I Love U"
- Lady Gaga — "Judas"
- Kana Nishino — "Esperanza"

== Live performances ==
- Linkin Park — "Lies Greed Misery / Numb / Burn It Down"
- 2NE1 — "Scream / I Am the Best"
- Sandaime J Soul Brothers — "1st Place" / "Fighters"
- Kyary Pamyu Pamyu — "Tsukema Tsukeru"
- Bump of Chicken — "Zero"
- Miliyah Kato — "Aiaiai / Heartbeat"
- Exile — 24karats ~Exile Tribe Special Medley~
- Juju — "Tadaima / Kiseki wo Nozomu Nara..."
- 2PM — "Beautiful / I'm Your Man"
- Perfume — "Laser Beam / Spring of Life"

== Guest celebrities ==
- Karina — presented Best Pop Video
- Scandal — presented Best R&B Video
- DJ Kaori and World Order — introduced Sandaime J Soul Brothers
- AAA — introduced Kyary Pamyu Pamyu
- Ms. Ooja — presented Best Karaokee! Song
- Daichi Miura — introduced Bump of Chicken
- Beni — presented Best Group Video
- W-inds — introduced Miliyah Kato
- Rola — presented Best New Artist
- Sonar Pocket — introduced Juju
- E-Girls — introduced 2PM
- Anna Tsuchiya — presented Video of the Year
- Nobuaki Kaneko — introduced Perfume
