= Living Dead (disambiguation) =

Living Dead is a zombie-apocalypse film franchise created by George A. Romero and John A. Russo, and related media.

Living dead or Living Dead may also refer to:

- Undead, beings that are dead but behave as if alive in mythology, legend, and fiction

== Books ==
- The Living Dead (novel), a 2021 novel by George A. Romero and Daniel Kraus

== Film and television ==
- The Living Dead (film), a 1919 German silent film
- Unheimliche Geschichten/The Living Dead (film), a 1932 German film
- The Living Dead (TV series), a 1995 British documentary series
- "The Living Dead" (The Avengers), a 1967 television episode
- "The Living Dead" (My Hero), a 2003 television episode

== Music ==
- The Living Dead (Bump of Chicken album), 2000, or the title song
- The Living Dead (Grave Digger album), 2018
- Living.../...Dead, a split EP by Mortician and Fleshgrind, 2004
- "Living Dead", a song by King Diamond from Deadly Lullabyes, 2004
- "Living Dead", a song by Marina and the Diamonds from Electra Heart, 2012
