= Arue (song) =

Single by Bump of Chicken

"Arue アルエ"

Single by Bump of Chicken

from the album Flame Vein
- Released: March 31, 2004
- Genre: Rock
- Label: Toy's Factory; TFCC-89099
- Songwriter: Motoo Fujiwara

Bump of Chicken singles chronology
"Sailing Day/Lost Man" (2003)	"Arue アルエ" (2004)	"Only Lonely Glory" (2004)

"Arue" (アルエ) is the seventh single by Bump of Chicken. The title track is from the album Flame Vein. The B-side is an acoustic version of "Ever Lasting Lie", from the album The Living Dead. The song's lyrics were inspired by the fictional character Rei Ayanami from the anime series Neon Genesis Evangelion.

== Track listing ==
All tracks are written by Motoo Fujiwara.

No.	Title	Japanese/English	Length
1.	"Arue"	アルエ/R.A
2.	"Ever Lasting Lie" (acoustic)
3.	"Kassai (Hana ni Nare)" (hidden track)	喝采 ～花になれ～/Applause (Become a Flower)

== Personnel ==
- Motoo Fujiwara — guitar, vocals
- Hiroaki Masukawa — lead guitar
- Yoshifumi Naoi — bass
- Hideo Masu — drums

== Chart performance ==
Chart	Peak Position
Oricon Weekly Charts	2
2004 Oricon Top 100 Singles	48
