= Cosmonaut (album) =

Studio album by Bump of Chicken
- Released: December 15, 2010
- Recorded: 2009–2010
- Genres: J-pop, rock
- Length: 79 minutes
- Label: Toy's Factory (TFCC-86347)

Bump of Chicken chronology
Present from You (2008)	Cosmonaut (2010)	Ray (2014)

Cosmonaut is the sixth studio album by Bump of Chicken, released on December 15, 2010. The album features the singles "R.I.P./Merry Christmas" (without "Merry Christmas"), "Happy", "Mahō no Ryōri ~Kimi Kara Kimi e~", and "Uchūhikōshi e no Tegami/Motorcycle".

== Track listing ==
All tracks are written by Motoo Fujiwara.

No.	Title	Length
1.	"Mitsuboshi Quartet" (三ツ星カルテット; Three Stars Quartet)	2:27
2.	"R.I.P."	5:32
3.	"Weather Report" (ウェザーリポート)	4:03
4.	"Bunbetsu Funtōki" (分別奮闘記; Record of My Struggles with Separating the Garbage)	3:44
5.	"Motorcycle" (モーターサイクル)	4:01
6.	"Tōmei Hikōsen" (透明飛行船; Invisible Airship)	4:08
7.	"Mahō no Ryōri (Kimi Kara Kimi e)" (魔法の料理 ～君から君へ～; Magical Cooking (From You to You))	6:45
8.	"Happy"	5:56
9.	"Rokujūrokugō-sen" (66号線; Route 66)	4:29
10.	"St. Elmo no Hi" (セントエルモの火; St. Elmo's fire)	4:35
11.	"Angel Fall"	5:32
12.	"Uchūhikōshi e no Tegami" (宇宙飛行士への手紙; A Letter to the Cosmonaut)	5:52
13.	"Innocent" (イノセント)	3:40
14.	"Beautiful Glider"	4:01
15.	"Of Course" (hidden track)

== Charts ==
Chart (2010)	Peak position
Japan Hot Albums (Billboard Japan)	1
Japanese Albums (Oricon)	1
