= Flame Vein =

Studio album by Bump of Chicken
- Released: March 18, 1999
- Genre: J-pop, rock
- Length: 36:22
- Label: High Line; HLR-004

Bump of Chicken chronology
Flame Vein (1999)	The Living Dead (2000)

Flame Vein is the debut studio album by Bump of Chicken, released on March 18, 1999. One track, "Arue", was later released as a limited print single. Another, "Little Braver", was later released on the "Lamp" single as a B-side. It was re-released on April 28, 2004, as Flame Vein +1 and included the song "Battle Cry" from B-side of the "Lamp" single.

== Track listing ==
All tracks written by Fujiwara Motoo.

1. "Glass no Blues" (ガラスのブルース, Garasu no Burūsu) — 6:19
2. "Trifling Song" (くだらない唄, Kudaranai Uta) — 4:03
3. "Arue" (アルエ, R.A.) — 4:18
4. "Little Braver" (リトルブレイバー, Ritorubureibā) — 5:13
5. "No Hit No Run" (ノーヒットノーラン, Nōhittonōran) — 4:25
6. "Special Song" (とっておきの唄, Totteoki no Uta) — 5:35
7. "Knife" (ナイフ, Naifu) — 6:31

Flame Vein +1 re-release version

8. "Battle Cry" (バトルクライ, Batorukurai) — 4:37

== Personnel ==
- Fujiwara Motoo — (藤原 基央) Guitar, vocals
- Masukawa Hiroaki — (増川 弘明) Guitar
- Naoi Yoshifumi — (直井 由文) Bass
- Masu Hideo — (升 秀夫) Drums
