= Zero (Bump of Chicken song) =

Single by Bump of Chicken

from the album Ray
- B-side: "Smile"
- Released: October 19, 2011
- Genre: Rock
- Length: 6:55
- Label: Toy's Factory
- Songwriter: Motoo Fujiwara
- Producers: Bump of Chicken & MOR

Bump of Chicken singles chronology
"Smile" (2011)	"Zero" (2011)	"Good Luck" (2012)

"Zero" (ゼロ) is a song by Japanese rock band Bump of Chicken. Created as the theme song of the 2011 role-playing video game Final Fantasy Type-0, it was released by Toy's Factory on October 19, 2011 as a single with their earlier track "Smile". The song was written by band member Motoo Fujiwara, with band producer MOR and Bump of Chicken as a whole arranging and producing. It later featured in two of Bump of Chicken's live concerts, and as a track on the 2014 album Ray.

The band, who were fans of the Final Fantasy series, were contacted about providing the Type-0 theme song in June 2010. Fujiwara wrote the song over two days in January 2011 inspired by early promotional art featuring the characters holding their weapons. He also recorded a version for acoustic guitar to be used in the game's opening. When mentioned the track saw praise from Japanese journalists, and it stayed in the Oricon charts for over thirty weeks while peaking at #2 in sales.

== Background ==
Beginning development in 2006 as Final Fantasy Agito XIII, the role-playing video game Final Fantasy Type-0 was released in Japan in 2011 for the PlayStation Portable. Directed by Hajime Tabata, the game was designed as a darker entry in the wider Final Fantasy franchise. The theme song "Zero" was created by Bump of Chicken, a Japanese rock band represented by the label Toy's Factory; the band is made up of lead vocalist and rhythm guitarist Motoo Fujiwara, guitarist Hiroaki Masukawa, bass player Yoshifumi Naoi, and drummer Hideo Masu. The music and lyrics were written by Fujiwara, and arranged by Bump of Chicken as a whole and band producer MOR. "Zero" would be the band's 21st single.

Tetsuya Nomura, who was main character designer for Type-0, invited Fujiwara to a preview screening for Final Fantasy VII: Advent Children (2005). The band were fans of the series, and Nomura voiced a wish for the band to work on a Final Fantasy theme song in the future. They were contacted in June 2010 through their record company about producing the Type-0 theme song, which both surprised and pleased the band. Fujiwara was shown a five-to-six page document detailing the setting and including concept illustrations and screenshots. The band also got a chance to see in-development screens during visits to Square Enix. The band were given no specific instructions about the song's style or tempo. Their only guideline was provided by Tabata, who suggested the theme song for the documentary series Centuries of Picture−"Is Paris Burning?" by Takeshi Kako−as a source of inspiration.

In response to the song's quality when it was shown to them, Tabata and the development team reworked the scenes where it was used to match its pace and tone, leaving the sequence unchanged until the song's final version was sent in. Upon seeing the final result, Fujiwara was moved to tears. Tabata stated that Type-0 would feel incomplete without "Zero". The opening lyrics were performed several times in-game by Yuki Kaji, voice actor for lead character Ace. "Zero" was later used in both the Japanese and international high definition remaster Final Fantasy Type-0 HD (2015). While a translated version was considered for the localization, the team got permission from the band to use the original song and add subtitles for the lyrics.

== Composition ==
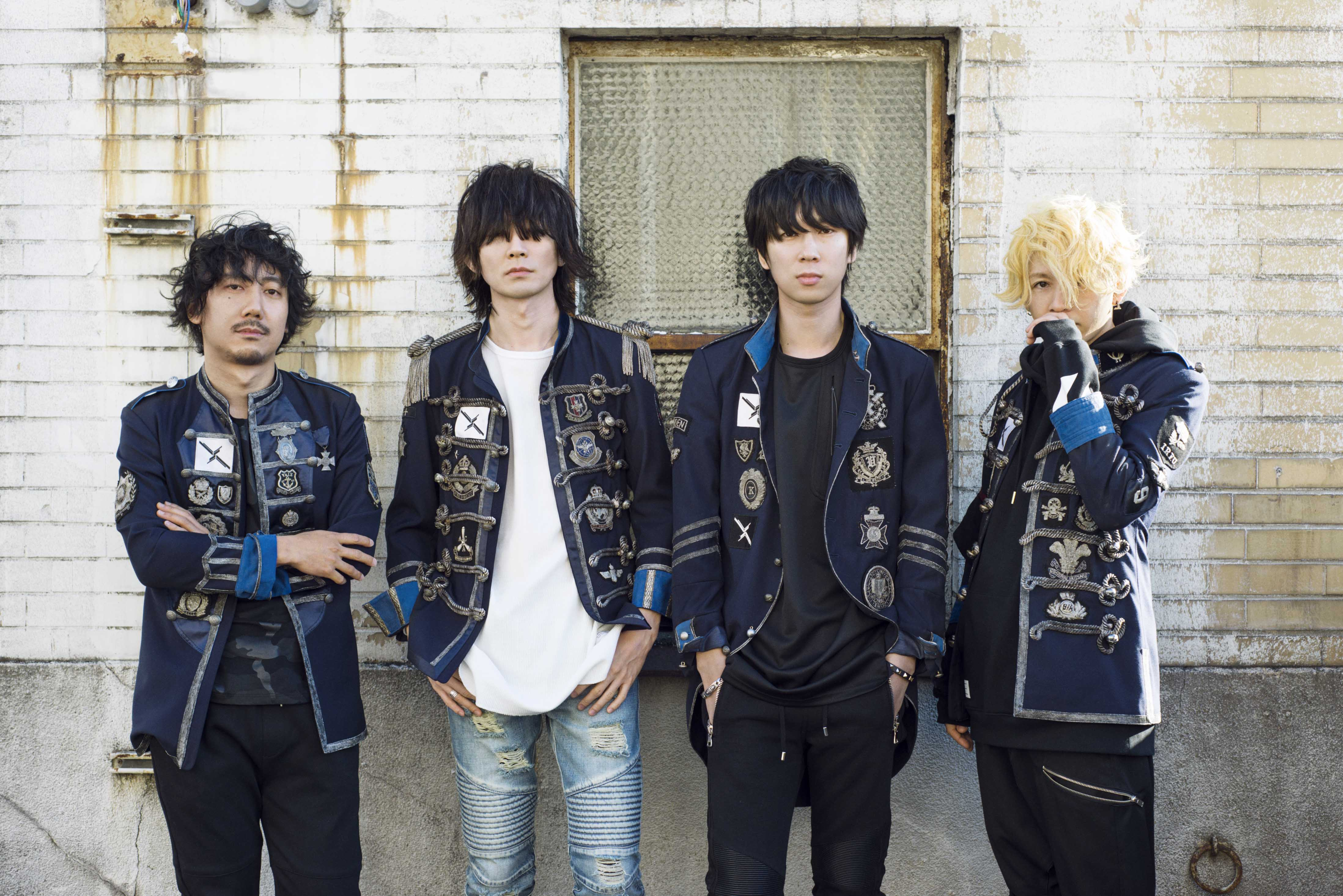
Japanese rock band Bump of Chicken (pictured 2016) composed and performed "Zero", inspired by early promotional art for Final Fantasy Type-0

Fujiwara wrote the song between January 20 and 21, 2011. During composition, Fujiwara never had a clear idea of what to create, instead creating the song on the fly while in the recording booth creating the guitar demo track. His main inspiration was a piece of concept art showing the twelve main characters grouped together holding their weapons. He did not know their names or the game's planned story, instead drawing on the illustration as an indication of conflict. During composition, the song had no title, eventually taking its name from the game's planned final title of Type-0. He described the song as being about the fighters, their families, and the listeners.

"Zero" is a mid-tempo rock track with a "lyrical melody" representing endings, lasting for 6 minutes and 55 seconds. Fujisaka began by creating the chord sequence. The song starts in the key A minor, with a D being introduced before moving into a chorus sung in C. The song's sombre melody was decided by Fujiwara based on this chosen chord sequence. The song opens with an arpeggio, and included a Mellotron and "chirping" using the drums and base to create a contrast with the rest of the song. To create an unusual sound alongside these, Fujiwara incorporated a Udu to add a "tribal" element. All of these elements were suggested by the band's producer.

After creating the initial track, Fujisaka showed it without warning to the other band members, playing promotional footage of Type-0 in the background to create the right atmosphere. Naoi remembered being moved by the combination of Type-0's world view and Fujiwara's work. He had difficulty playing for the song for a time until he separated the song from the game's context and treated it as another song by the band. An alternate version for acoustic guitar was performed by Fujiwara for the game's opening. He created the opening version after talking with Square Enix staff, intending it to have a different tone from the original version. The in-game version also incorporated the recurring "Final Fantasy Main Theme" by Nobuo Uematsu.

== Release ==
The collaboration with Bump of Chicken and the song's title was announced in July 2011. Originally scheduled for release on October 5 that year, the release was pushed back to October 19 due to the game's release being delayed. The single released in two editions by Toy's Factory. The standard edition was a CD release, and the limited edition was a combined release with CD and a DVD containing the music videos created by Square Enix staff and the opening version of "Zero". Both came packaged with the band's previous single "Smile" as the B-side. At Fujiwara's request, the limited edition used the game's logo illustration by Yoshitaka Amano for the cover art. The CD also featured pixel artwork of the band members similar to Final Fantasy character sprites of the Super Famicom era. The CD Limited Edition included the hidden track "Shinsen Oyasai Ōkoku no Densetsu no Theme" after the opening version of "Zero". "Zero" was later performed live at Bump of Chicken's 2012 Gold Glitter Tour, and was among the tracks included in the band's 2014 album Ray. It was also performed live during the band's 2014 Willpolis tour.

Two different music videos were created for "Zero". The standard music video combined shadow puppet-style animated segments telling of two prisoners escaping an army, with matching live-action contemporary dance performed by the Japan-based Broadway Dance Centre, and scenes of the band performing the song. The dance sections were choreographed by Ryumi Horyu, with Yohei Suzuki and Matoko Nishibayashi as the lead dancers. Alternate music videos were created by Square Enix staff using in-game cutscene footage for both the opening and full ending versions.

Tracklists

All tracks are written by Motoo Fujiwara.

Regular edition
No.	Title	Japanese title	Length
1.	"Zero"	ゼロ	6:55
2.	"Smile"		8:26

All tracks are written by Motoo Fujiwara.

Limited edition
No.	Title	Japanese title	Length
1.	"Zero"	ゼロ	6:55
2.	"Smile"		8:26
3.	"Zero ("Final Fantasy Type-0" opening version)"	ゼロ“FINAL FANTASY零式”オープニングver.	2:58
4.	"Shinsen Oyasai Ōkoku no Densetsu no Theme" (hidden track)	新鮮・お野菜王国の伝説のテーマ	3:07

Bonus DVD
No.	Title	Director(s)	Length
1.	"Zero" (Special music video)	Square Enix
2.	"Zero (Final Fantasy Type-0 opening version)" (Digest music video)	Square Enix

== Reception ==
According to a news released by Billboard Japan, the single topped the Billboard Japan Hot 100 and reached third place in Japan Airplay during its opening fortnight on sale. In the Oricon charts, the single peaked at #2 and stayed in the charts for 32 weeks.

In a mini-review of the single, CDJournal praised the song's portrayal of "setsuna" through its melody and instrumentation. In a report by Barks Music News of the band's 2014 live concert, Fujiwara was praised for his singing of "Zero" which "touched the heart". In a 2021 fan-based list of Bump of Chicken's five best music videos, the video for "Zero" was listed as third; the Oricon staff cited the song as "magnificent" and outside the band's usual style, along with being a fan favourite.
