= Happy (Bump of Chicken song) =

Single by Bump of Chicken

from the album Cosmonaut (album)
- Released: April 14, 2010
- Genre: Rock
- Label: Toy's Factory; TFCC-89300
- Songwriter: Motoo Fujiwara

Bump of Chicken singles chronology
"R.I.P./Merry Christmas" (2009)	"Happy" (2010)	"Mahō no Ryōri (Kimi kara Kimi e)" (2010)

"Happy" is the sixteenth single by Bump of Chicken, released on April 14, 2010. It peaked at number-one on the Oricon weekly charts and Japan Hot 100.

== Track listing ==
1. "HAPPY" - 6.01
2. "pinkie" - 5.05 - It was used as a theme song of Fuji Television's talk documentary 1924.
3. "Love Triangle, Kimi to Boku to Iinchō ver." (ラブ・トライアングル 君と僕と委員長ver., Love Triangle: You, Me and the Chairman ver.) (hidden track)

== Personnel ==
- Fujiwara Motoo — Guitar, vocals
- Masukawa Hiroaki — Guitar
- Naoi Yoshifumi — Bass
- Masu Hideo — Drums

== Chart performance ==
Weekly chart performance for "Happy"
Chart	Peak position
Japan Hot 100	1
Oricon Daily Charts	1
Oricon Weekly Charts	1
Oricon Monthly Charts	1
2010 Oricon Top 100 Singles	36

Annual chart rankings for "Happy"
Chart (2010)	Rank
Japan Adult Contemporary (Billboard)	93
