= R.I.P./Merry Christmas =

Single by Bump of Chicken

from the album Cosmonaut (album)
- Released: November 25, 2009
- Recorded: 2009
- Genre: Rock
- Label: Toy's Factory; TFCC-89289

Bump of Chicken singles chronology
"Mayday" (2007)	"R.I.P./Merry Christmas" (2009)	"Happy" (2010)

"R.I.P./Merry Christmas" is the fifteenth single by Bump of Chicken that was released on November 25, 2009.

== Track listing ==
1. "R.I.P." - 5:51
2. "Merry Christmas" - 6:51
3. "New World Summit" (new world サミット) (hidden track) - This track is the longest song ever among their hidden tracks.

== Personnel ==
- Fujiwara Motoo — Guitar, vocals
- Masukawa Hiroaki — Guitar
- Naoi Yoshifumi — Bass
- Masu Hideo — Drums

== Chart performance ==
Chart	Peak Position
Billboard yearly Japan Hot 100 (2010)	27
Oricon Weekly Charts	2
Oricon Monthly Charts	6
2009 Oricon Top 100 Singles	29
