= Aurora Arc =

- Regular edition cover

Studio album by Bump of Chicken
- Released: July 10, 2019
- Genre: J-pop
- Length: 64:59
- Label: Toy's Factory

Bump of Chicken chronology
Butterflies (2016)	Aurora Arc (2019)

Aurora Arc is the ninth studio album by Japanese band Bump of Chicken, released through Toy's Factory on July 10, 2019. It debuted atop the Oricon Albums Chart, selling 202,157 copies in its first week. The lead single, "Aria", was released in mid-2016.

Several of the tracks were used as theme songs for anime series; "Gekkou" was used as the first opening theme of Karakuri Circus, while "Sirius" was used as the opening of the anime Juushinki Pandora, with "Spica" being used as its ending theme. The band embarked on the Aurora Ark tour in support of the album from July to November 2019.

== Background ==
Eleven of the tracks were released prior to the album, with nine issued as singles from August 2016 to March 2019; the previously unreleased tracks are "Aurora Arc", "Junglegym" and "Nagareboshi no Shoutai".

== Cover art ==
The cover art is a photo of the aurora borealis taken in Yellowknife, Canada, by the photographer Yoshiharu Ota, who collaborated with visual designer Verdy on the sleeve.

== Track listing ==
No.	Title	Length
1.	"Aurora Arc"	2:06
2.	"Gekkou" (月虹; Moonbow)	4:47
3.	"Aurora"	4:39
4.	"Kinen Satsuei" (記念撮影; Commemorative Photograph)	4:42
5.	"Junglegym" (ジャングルジム; Jangarujimu)	6:28
6.	"Ribbon" (リボン, Ribon)	4:31
7.	"Sirius" (シリウス, Shiriusu)	4:22
8.	"Aria" (アリア; Aria)	6:16
9.	"Hanashi ga Shitai Yo" (話がしたいよ; I Want to Talk to You)	4:19
10.	"Answer" (アンサー; Ansā)	5:20
11.	"Bouen no March" (望遠のマーチ; Long Distance March)	4:18
12.	"Spica"	4:15
13.	"Shin Sekai" (新世界; New World)	3:45
14.	"Nagareboshi no Shoutai" (流れ星の正体; The True Form of a Shooting Star)	5:11
Total length:		64:59

== Charts ==
=== Weekly charts ===
Chart (2019)	Peak position
Japan Hot Albums (Billboard Japan)	1
Japanese Albums (Oricon)	1

=== Year-end charts ===
Chart (2019)	Position
Japanese Albums (Oricon)	11

== Certifications ==
Region	Certification	Certified units/sales
Japan (RIAJ)	Platinum	250,000^{^}
^{^} Shipments figures based on certification alone.
