= Present from You =

Compilation album by Bump of Chicken
- Released: June 18, 2008
- Genre: Alternative rock; power pop
- Length: 1:07:34 (without hidden track)
- Label: Toy's Factory; TFCC-86257

Bump of Chicken chronology
Orbital Period (2007)	Present from You (2008)	Cosmonaut (2010)

Professional ratings
Review scores
Source	Rating
AllMusic	4/5 stars

Present from You is a B-side collection by Bump of Chicken, released on June 18, 2008.

== Track listing ==
Orbital Period
No.	Title	Length
1.	"Laugh Maker" (ラフ・メイカー, Rafu Meikaa)	3:47
2.	"Bye Bye Thank You" (バイバイサンキュー, Baibai Sankyuu)	5:01
3.	"Kanojo to Hoshi no isu" (彼女と星の椅子, She and the Star Chair)	3:34
4.	"Holiday" (ホリデイ, Horidei)	3:25
5.	"Ever Lasting Lie" (Acoustic Version)	8:38
6.	"Suimin Jikan" (睡眠時間, Time to Sleep)	4:37
7.	"Yume no Kainushi" (夢の飼い主, The Dream's Owner)	4:45
8.	"Snow Smile (Ringing Version)" (スノースマイル ～Ringing Version～, Sunoo sumairu)	5:47
9.	"Ginga tetsudou" (銀河鉄道, Galactic Railroad)	6:33
10.	"Makkana sora wo mitadarouka" (真っ赤な空を見ただろうか, Have You Seen the Red Sky?)	3:59
11.	"Toukyou Sanka" (東京賛歌, Tokyo Hymn)	3:51
12.	"Garasu no Buruusu (28 years round)" (ガラスのブルース (28 years round), Glass Blues (28 Years Round))	8:08
13.	"Present" (プレゼント, Purezento)	4:52
14.	"Believe (Demo Tape Version)" (Believe デモテープ編, (Hidden track))	6:22
Total length:		1:13:56

== Personnel ==
- Fujiwara Motoo — vocals, guitar
- Masukawa Hiroaki — guitar
- Naoi Yoshifumi — bass
- Masu Hideo — drums
