= Butterflies (Bump of Chicken album) =

Studio album by Bump of Chicken
- Released: February 10, 2016
- Genres: J-pop; alternative rock
- Length: 57:01
- Label: Toy's Factory

Bump of Chicken chronology
Ray (2014)	Butterflies (2016)	Aurora Arc (2019)

Butterflies is the eighth studio album by Japanese band Bump of Chicken, released through Toy's Factory on February 10, 2016. It debuted atop the Oricon Albums Chart, selling 197,160 copies in its first week.

"Go" was used as the opening theme for Granblue Fantasy The Animation, "Hello, World!" was used as the opening theme for Blood Blockade Battlefront, and "Fighter" was used as the ending theme for March Comes in Like a Lion.

== Critical reception ==
Writing for The Japan Times, Ronald Taylor called Butterflies "nothing new", comparing it to the sound of the band's previous album, 2014's Ray, in that it is "like a giant retread of its usual alternative rock". Taylor also wrote that with the track "Butterfly", the band "blending" EDM into their sound 2016 feels "dated", and that other Japanese bands "are getting better results" when doing so. Acclaim was reserved for the tracks "Hello, World!" and "Parade", with the former noted for its "complicated melody" on which vocalist Motoo Fujiwara "really shine[s]", and the latter for its "captivating piano melody" with an "explosive climax".

== Track listing ==
No.	Title	Length
1.	"Go"	6:01
2.	"Hello, World!"	4:08
3.	"Butterfly"	5:57
4.	"Ryūsei-gun" (流星群, Meteor Shower)	6:47
5.	"Hōseki ni Natta Hi" (宝石になった日, Those Days Became Jewels)	4:57
6.	"Colony" (コロニー, Koronī)	5:16
7.	"Parade" (パレード, Parēdo)	3:54
8.	"Dai Gaman Taikai" (大我慢大会, Endurance Tournament)	4:06
9.	"Kodoku no Gasshō" (孤独の合唱, Lonely Chorus)	4:54
10.	"You Were Here"	5:24
11.	"Fighter" (ファイター, Faitā)	5:37
Total length:		57:01

== Charts ==
Chart (2016)	Peak position
Japan Hot Albums (Billboard Japan)	1
Japanese Albums (Oricon)	1
