= Good Luck (Bump of Chicken song) =

Single by Bump of Chicken

from the album Ray
- B-side: "Diamant"
- Released: January 18, 2012
- Recorded: 2011
- Genre: J-Pop, folk rock
- Length: 7:08
- Label: Toy's Factory
- Songwriter: Motoo Fujiwara

Bump of Chicken singles chronology
| "Zero" (2011) | "Good Luck" (2012) | "Firefly" (2012) |

"Good Luck" (グッドラック, Guddo Rakku) is Japanese rock band Bump of Chicken's 22nd single, featured as the ending theme to the film Always Sanchōme no Yūhi '64.

== Track list ==
All tracks are written by Motoo Fujiwara.

Regular edition
| No. | Title | Arranger(s) | Length |
|---|---|---|---|
| 1. | "Good Luck" (グッドラック) | Bump of Chicken | 7:08 |
| 2. | "Diamant" (ディアマン; Diamond) | Bump of Chicken | 6:37 |
| 3. | "Bura-Bura Girl" (hidden track) | Bump of Chicken | 3:05 |

All tracks are written by Motoo Fujiwara.

Limited edition
| No. | Title | Arranger(s) | Length |
|---|---|---|---|
| 1. | "Good Luck" (グッドラック) | Bump of Chicken | 7:08 |
| 2. | "Diamant" (ディアマン; Diamond) | Bump of Chicken | 6:37 |
| 3. | "Good Luck" (strings version) | Naoki Satō | 4:14 |
| 4. | "Bura-Bura Boy" (hidden track) | Bump of Chicken | 2:09 |

Bonus DVD
| No. | Title | Director(s) | Length |
|---|---|---|---|
| 1. | "Good Luck" (Short film) | Takashi Yamazaki | 35:00 |
| 2. | "Good Luck" (music video) | Takashi Yamazaki | 9:00 |
