= Ray (Bump of Chicken album) =

Studio album by Bump of Chicken
- Released: March 12, 2014
- Genre: J-pop; alternative rock
- Length: 67:35
- Label: Toy's Factory
- Producer: Bump of Chicken & Mor

Bump of Chicken chronology
Cosmonaut (2010)	Ray (2014)	Butterflies (2016)

Ray is the seventh studio album by Japanese band Bump of Chicken, released through Toy's Factory on March 12, 2014.

== Album ==
"Niji wo Matsu Hito" was used as the main theme to the film Gatchaman, "Zero" was used as the main theme for Final Fantasy Type-0, "Tomodachi no Uta" was used as the ending theme for Doraemon: Nobita and the New Steel Troops—Winged Angels, and "Good Luck" was used as the main theme for Always: Sunset on Third Street '64.

== Reception ==
It debuted atop the Oricon Albums Chart, selling 182,003 copies in its first week.

== Track listing ==
No.	Title	Length
1.	"WILL"	3:48
2.	"Niji wo Matsu Hito" (虹を待つ人, A Human Waiting for Rainbow)	3:59
3.	"ray"	5:06
4.	"Sazankurosu" (サザンクロス, Southern Cross)	4:12
5.	"Rasutowan" (ラストワン, Last One)	4:42
6.	"morning glow"	4:48
7.	"Zero" (ゼロ)	6:55
8.	"Tōchi" (トーチ, Torch)	4:17
9.	"Smile"	8:17
10.	"firefly"	5:28
11.	"white note"	3:22
12.	"Tomodachi no Uta" (友達の唄, A Song of Friends)	6:14
13.	"(please) forgive"	5:00
14.	"Guddo Rakku" (グッドラック, Good Luck)	7:04
Total length:		67:35

== Charts ==
Chart (2014)	Peak position
Japanese Albums (Oricon)	1
