= Bump of Chicken =

Japanese rock band

BUMP OF CHICKEN
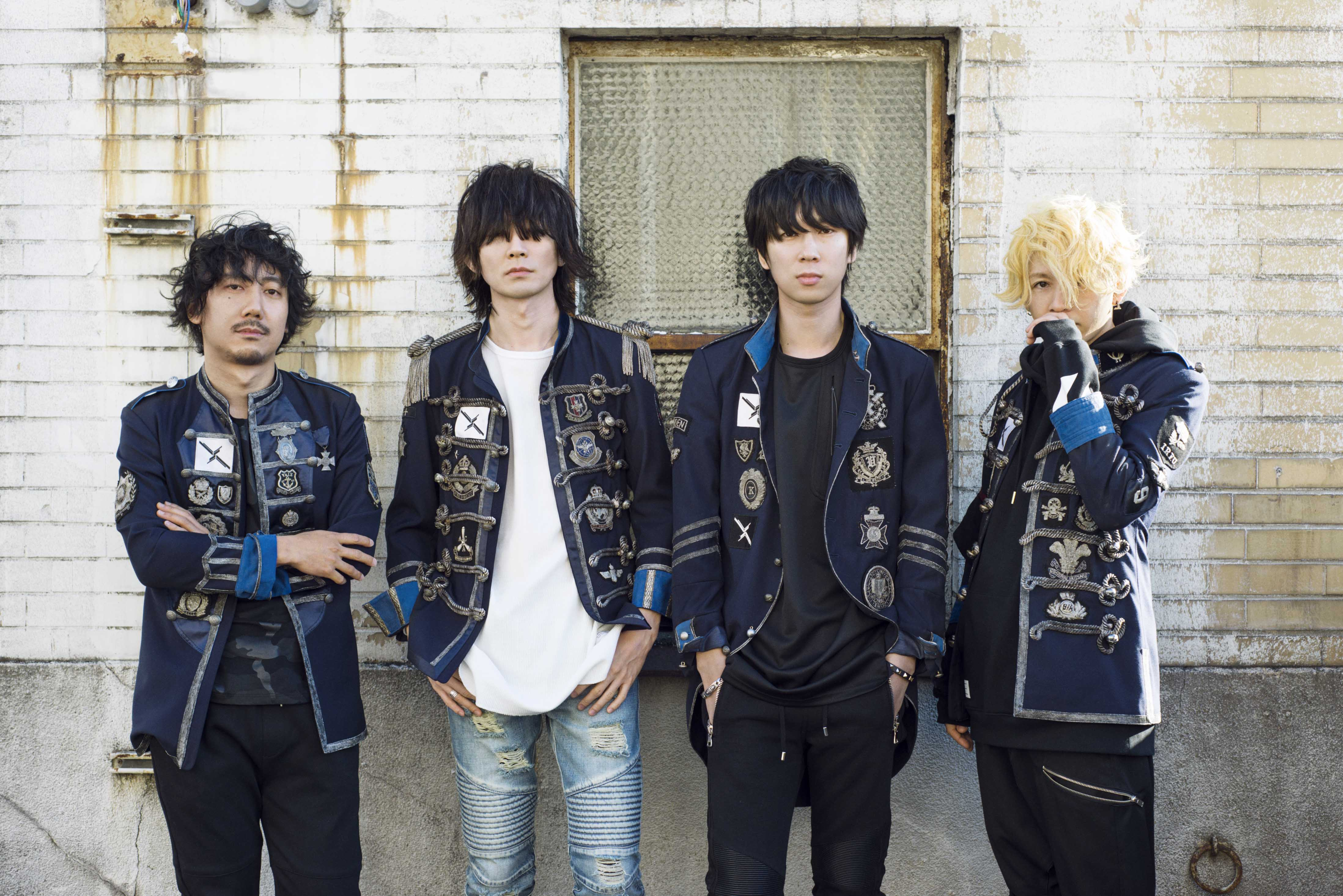
- From left: Masu, Fujiwara, Masukawa, Naoi (2016)

Background information
- Origin: Sakura, Chiba Prefecture, Japan
- Genres: Alternative rock; Indie rock; electronic rock
- Years active: 1996–present
- Labels: High Line Records; LONGFELLOW; Toy's Factory
- Members: Motoo Fujiwara; Hiroaki Masukawa; Yoshifumi Naoi; Hideo Masu
- Website: www.bumpofchicken.com

Bump of Chicken (Japanese: バンプ・オブ・チキン, Hepburn: Banpu Obu Chikin; stylized in all caps) is a Japanese alternative rock group from Sakura, Chiba. The band members are Motoo Fujiwara (vocals, rhythm), Hiroaki Masukawa (guitar), Yoshifumi Naoi (bass) and Hideo Masu (drums). Since their conception in 1994, they have released 28 singles and 10 albums. They are a popular group in Japan; every release since their third single, "Tentai Kansoku", has charted in the top ten on the Oricon Weekly Charts. Their music has been used in various video games and as theme songs for movies, television shows and anime in Japan.

== Members ==
Name	Part	Date of Birth	Blood Type
Motoo Fujiwara	Vocal Guitar Lyrics Composition	April 12, 1979	Type O
Hiroaki Masukawa	Guitar Chorus	December 20, 1979	Type A
Yoshifumi Naoi	Bass Chorus	October 9, 1979	Type A
Hideo Masu	Drums Chorus	August 10, 1979	Type A

== History ==
The four members of BUMP OF CHICKEN have known each other since kindergarten, although at that time, Fujiwara, Naoi, and Masukawa did not know Masu. After graduating from kindergarten, Naoi, Masu, and Masukawa attended the same elementary school, Sakura City Usui Elementary School. Later, they all attended the same middle school, Sakura City Usui Nishi Junior High School, where they reunited.

In 1994, during their third year of middle school, they formed a band for the school's cultural festival (the band's original name was "Hage Band"), playing a cover of The Beatles' version of "Twist and Shout". At the time, Masukawa did not play guitar, and his role was more akin to a staff member, assisting with tasks like raising and lowering the curtains.

By 1995, the band began performing original songs and participated in various competitions. Eventually, Masukawa was officially added to the band as the guitarist.

On February 11, 1996, the band officially became the current lineup and changed their name to BUMP OF CHICKEN (the name was chosen to mean "the retaliation of the weak" or "the strike of the coward"). The band later designated this date as their "formation anniversary".

After a brief hiatus to focus on Masukawa and Masu's university entrance exams, the band resumed activities in June 1998, performing as the live band for the theater production Hashiru Onna by the theater company "Switch". Fujiwara also composed about six songs for the performance.

On October 24, 1998, BUMP OF CHICKEN released their first CD demo, titled BUMP OF CHICKEN, limited to 500 copies. The demo sold out in just one month.

=== 1999–2000: "FLAME VEIN" and "THE LIVING DEAD" ===
In 1999, BUMP OF CHICKEN released their debut album, FLAME VEIN on High Line Records. Later that year, they released their first single, "Lamp". In 2000, they released THE LIVING DEAD, their final release on High Line. They also held their first live tour, "Tsuaa Pokiiru (ツアーポキール)", during March and April.

Later in 2000, the group switched to Toy's Factory, releasing their first single on the label, "Diamond", in September.

=== 2000–2002: "jupiter" ===
BUMP OF CHICKEN's first big success occurred when their single, "Tentai Kansoku", appeared on the Oricon Weekly Charts in 2001. They held two live tours, "Star Porking Tours (スターポーキングツアーズ, Sutaa Pookingu Tsuaazu) 2001" beginning in March and "Surf Porkin'" beginning in July. In October, they released "Harujion". They released their first album on Toy's Factory, jupiter, in February 2002 and it was their first number one on the Oricon Weekly Charts. In the summer of 2002, their music was featured on the Japanese TV drama Tentai Kansoku, giving them more exposure.

At the end of 2002, the group released the single "Snow Smile".

=== 2002–2004: "Yggdrasil" ===
In 2003, BUMP OF CHICKEN saw the release of their first double A-side single "Lost Man/sailing day". "sailing day" was used as the ending theme to the animated movie One Piece: Dead End Adventure. The beginning of 2004 saw a slew of re-releases. "Arue", from their album FLAME VEIN, was released as a single in March. They re-released their first two albums in April. FLAME VEIN received an extra song and was re-released as FLAME VEIN +1. THE LIVING DEAD received no modifications. In July, the group released "Only Lonely Glory", which became their first single to chart at number one on the Oricon Weekly Charts. A month later, they released their fourth album, Yggdrasil, which was their second album to reach number one on the Oricon Weekly Charts. Shortly after, they released "Sharin no Uta", from Yggdrasil, as a single.

=== 2005–2007: "orbital period" ===
In 2005, BUMP OF CHICKEN released two singles, "Planetarium" and second double A-side single "supernova/Karma". Karma was used as the theme song for Namco's "Tales of the Abyss". The band's next single, "Namida no Furusato" was used in a commercial for Lotte Airs. It became the group's second number one single. In 2007, they released the singles "Hana no Na" and "Mayday" on the same day. The two singles reached number one and two respectively on the Oricon Weekly Charts. BUMP OF CHICKEN released their fifth studio album, orbital period, on December 19, 2007. They released their first compilation album present from you on June 18, 2008. This album contains b-sides from singles and other non-album tracks.

=== 2008–2010："COSMONAUT" ===
On November 25, 2009, BUMP OF CHICKEN released its third double A-side single "R.I.P./Merry Christmas", their first single in two years. On April 14, 2010, they released "HAPPY" and then in the following week, another single, "Mahō no Ryōri (Kimi kara Kimi e)". These two singles also reached number one consecutively for two weeks on the Oricon Weekly Charts, the first time a band achieved this since Orange Range's "Love Parade" and "Onegai! Señorita" in 2005. They released a fourth double A-side single "Uchūhikōshi e no Tegami/Motorcycle" on October 13, 2010, and they released a music video for the song on Toy's Factory's YouTube channel on September 14, 2010, which surpassed 200,000 views in two days. On December 15, 2010, they released their sixth studio album, COSMONAUT but it did not feature the song "Merry Christmas".

=== 2011–2014: "RAY" ===
In 2011, BUMP OF CHICKEN announced that they wrote the song "Tomodachi no Uta" as the theme song for the animated 3D movie Doraemon: Nobita and the New Steel Troops: ~Angel Wings~, and "Tomodachi no Uta" was released as the single on February 23, 2011. They also released two singles, "Smile" on May 11, 2011, with all revenue from the ringtone and CD sales donated to the Japan Red Cross for victims of the 2011 Tōhoku earthquake and tsunami. On October 19, 2011, they released their 21st single "Zero", which was used as the theme song for video game by Square Enix, Final Fantasy Type-0. It achieved over 200,000 sales, marking their highest sales since "Hana no Na" and "Mayday".

Also in 2012, they released two more singles "Good Luck" in January 18, which earned their seventh No.1 spot on the Oricon Single Chart. On September 12, they release "firefly", which was used as the theme song for the Japanese drama Breathless Summer (息もできない夏; Iki mo Dekinai Natsu), marking their first ever TV drama theme song.

On July 3, 2013, BUMP OF CHICKEN released their first best-of albums, BUMP OF CHICKEN I <1999–2004> and BUMP OF CHICKEN II <2005–2010> and held their first stadium live at QVC Marine Field in Chiba on August 9, 2013 that was live streamed fully in YouTube. The band also released a new single "Niji o Matsu Hito", featured in the live-action movie Gatchaman, as a digital-only release on August 21, 2013.

From September 9, 2013, BUMP OF CHICKEN started their arena tour WILLPOLIS 2013, with the final shows held at Nippon Budokan on October 28 and 29. During the tour's final show, the band announced the release of their new album RAY, scheduled for late January 2014.

On March 12, 2014, BUMP OF CHICKEN released RAY, their first original album in over three years. On the same day, the band released a special version of the song "ray", featuring Hatsune Miku, marking the band's first collaboration with a featured artist.

On March 20, 2014 it was announced that lead vocalist Fujiwara had been hospitalized for pneumothorax. As a result, the band's solo concert scheduled for March 31, 2014, in Shin-Kiba was postponed to July 15, 2014. Despite concerns about Fujiwara's health, the band continued their WILLPOLIS 2014 tour, which began on April 5, 2014. The tour included a performance in Taiwan on June 28 and concluded with a Tokyo Dome show on July 31.

On August 1, 2014, they released the digital-only single "You were here", and also made their first appearance on the TV show Music Station on July 25, 2014.

The WILLPOLIS 2014 tour's progress, particularly the Tokyo Dome show, was featured in a documentary broadcast by NHK in October 2014. Additionally, on December 5, 2014, the band released their first documentary film, BUMP OF CHICKEN "WILLPOLIS 2014" Theater Version.

=== 2014–2016: "Butterflies" ===
On November 28, 2014, BUMP OF CHICKEN released "Fighter", a digital-only single written as a collaboration with the manga March Comes In like a Lion. The song was also included as part of the special edition of March Comes In like a Lion Volume 10, published by Hakusensha. Later that year, on November 29, 2014, the band released "Parade", written for the film Parasyte, as another digital-only single.

On April 22, 2015, the band released the double A-side single "Hello, world!/ Colony", marking a major commercial success with over 200,000 copies sold. As part of the release, special live performances were held on July 30 at Intex Osaka and August 4 at Yokohama Arena. Due to high demand, the Yokohama concert was also live-streamed to cinemas nationwide, attracting 47,000 viewers, marking the band's first-ever live screening event.

On December 31, 2015, BUMP OF CHICKEN performed for the first time at the 66th NHK Kohaku Uta Gassen, where they sang "RAY" live from the Countdown Japan 15/16 venue.

On February 10, 2016, the band released their sixth studio album Butterflies, which debuted at No. 1 on the Oricon Weekly Albums Chart and also became the first BUMP OF CHICKEN album to reach the No. 1 position on the Monthly Albums Chart. The following day, they held their 20th anniversary special live 20 at Makuhari Messe in Chiba, drawing 25,000 attendees. The performance was later released as the BUMP OF CHICKEN 20th Anniversary Special Live "20" DVD/Blu-RAY on July 13, 2016.

Starting in April 2016, the band launched their first-ever stadium tour, BUMP OF CHICKEN Stadium Tour 2016 "BFLY", which toured six venues, attracting a total of 280,000 people. The final show at Nissan Stadium in Yokohama drew 140,000 attendees across two days. This performance was recorded and released as BUMP OF CHICKEN Stadium Tour 2016 "BFLY" Nissan Stadium 2016/7/16,17 on December 21, 2016.

The band also made multiple appearances on NHK’s SONGS music program in December 2015 and February 2016, with hundreds of requests for re-broadcasts. In May 2016, an edited "Complete Version" of their performance was aired. On June 17, 2016, the music video for ""Hōseki ni Natta Hi" (宝石になった日, Those Days Became Jewels), from Butterflies, was released.

=== 2016–2019: aurora arc ===
In July 2016, BUMP OF CHICKEN provided the theme song "Aria" for the TBS drama Aogeba Tōtoshi, which was released digitally on August 17, 2016. Later that year, they provided the opening theme song "Answer" and the ending theme song "Fighter" for the anime March Comes In like a Lion, with "Answer" released as a digital single on December 21, 2016. In April 2017, the band contributed the opening theme song "GO" for Granblue Fantasy: The Animation, and a commercial for the game also aired in May 2017.

On January 28, 2017, BUMP OF CHICKEN released a demo of their new song "Nagareboshi no Shōtai" for free on their website until January 30, 2017. They also performed "Ribbon" during a live-streamed anniversary special on February 10, 2017, which was released digitally on May 1, 2017. The band also opened official Twitter and Instagram accounts on the same day. On July 5, 2017, BUMP OF CHICKEN released "Kinen Satsuei" as a digital single, which had been used in a Nissin Cup Noodles commercial.

From September 16, 2017, to February 11, 2018, the band toured nationwide with their BUMP OF CHICKEN TOUR 2017–2018 "PATHFINDER" tour, with a complete recording of their second-day performance at Saitama Super Arena released on August 8, 2018 .

In April 2018, BUMP OF CHICKEN provided the opening theme "Sirius" and the ending theme "Spica" for the anime Last Hope (重神機パンドーラ, Juushinki Pandora). "Sirius" was released as a digital single on September 24, 2018.

Later June 2018, they also provided "Bōen no Māchi" as a commercial song for Yo-Kai Watch World, a new mobile game app developed by GungHo Online Entertainment and Level-5. The song was released as a digital single on July 23, 2018.

In October 2018, BUMP OF CHICKEN provided the theme song "Hanashi ga Shitai yo" for the film Okuotoko (億男, Okuotoko). The band also contributed "Gekkou" (Moonbow) as the opening theme for the anime Karakuri Circus. On October 19, 2018, they made a special appearance on Music Station, performing "Hanashi ga Shitai yo" live for the first time since their last appearance in July 2014. This marked their return to television after a two-and-a-half-year hiatus since their appearance on SONGS in 2016.

On November 14, 2018, the band released their first single in about three and a half years, Hanashi ga Shitai yo / Sirius / Spica. "Hanashi ga Shitai yo" had been released as a digital single on October 15, 2018.

In December 2018, BUMP OF CHICKEN wrote and provided the new song "Shin Sekai" (New World) as the theme song for Lotte's 70th-anniversary special animation Baby I Love You-Daze. That same month, their song "Lost Man", originally released in 2003, was chosen as the theme song for Sapporo Beer’s 95th Hakone Ekiden - Beyond the Hakone Ekiden commercial. The commercial aired during the 95th Tokyo-Hakone Roundtrip University Ekiden on January 2 and 3, 2019.

In January 2019, BUMP OF CHICKEN wrote and provided the theme song "Aurora" for the TBS Sunday drama Good Wife.

On June 28, 2019, the band made all the tracks from their single "Diamond" including "Hello, world!/Colony", and the album FLAME VEIN +1 available for streaming.

On July 10, 2019, they released aurora arc, their seventh original studio album, after a gap of about three and a half years. From July 12 to November 4, 2019, BUMP OF CHICKEN embarked on their "aurora ark" tour, which included 18 performances across four dome venues and five live houses.

=== 2020–2024: Iris ===
In May 2020, in response to the COVID-19 pandemic, BUMP OF CHICKEN released the full live footage of their BUMP OF CHICKEN TOUR 2017–2018 PATHFINDER SAITAMA SUPER ARENA concert film on YouTube for a limited time. Additionally, the band released nearly all of their music videos that had not been previously available on YouTube, including those from after their major debut.

On August 24, 2020, during their regular radio program PONTSUKA!!, Fujiwara announced his marriage to a non-celebrity woman.

On September 10, 2020, the band released the single "Gravity". This track was later chosen as the theme song for the animated film Love Me, Love Me Not (2020).

On September 18, 2020, news of Naoi's past personal issues with women surfaced. Following this, Naoi issued a public apology, and on September 25, a statement was issued by the remaining three members, announcing that Naoi would be taking a hiatus from his music activities. The band continued to perform as a three-piece for the time being.

On September 29, 2020, BUMP OF CHICKEN released a collaboration music video for Pokémon featuring the song "Acacia", titled "GOTCHA!" that was uploaded to celebrate the release of the Crown Tundra DLC in Pokémon Sword and Shield for the Nintendo Switch. The music video was produced by Bones and directed by Rie Matsumoto. The song was made available for pre-release on September 30, 2020. On November 4, 2020, they released their first physical single in about two years, Acacia / Gravity, along with the live concert film BUMP OF CHICKEN TOUR 2019 aurora ark TOKYO DOME.

On February 11, 2021, the band released "Flare", their first single in about three months, to mark their 25th anniversary as a band.

On May 18, 2021, they released "Nanairo", which they had written as the theme song for the NHK morning drama Okaeri Mone.

On June 6, 2021, BUMP OF CHICKEN announced the return of Naoi's activities, and on September 5, 2021, Naoi also returned to the regular radio program PONTSUKA!!.

On October 13, 2021, it was announced that their song "Small world" would be used as the theme song for the film Sumikko Gurashi: The Little Wizard in the Blue Moonlight. To coincide with this, the band updated their artist photos for the first time in a year. The song was released digitally on November 1, 2021.

On November 14, 2021, BUMP OF CHICKEN streamed their studio live performance Silver Jubilee on YouTube, marking the return of the four-member band for the first time in two years. Immediately after, the band announced the release of the physical single "Nanairo" and the live concert event BUMP OF CHICKEN LIVE 2022 Silver Jubilee at Makuhari Messe 02/10-11. The physical single "Nanairo" was released on December 22, 2022.

On December 31, 2022, the band performed at the 72nd NHK Kohaku Uta Gassen, singing "Tentai Kansoku" and "Nanairo", marking their second appearance since 2015.

On February 14, 2023, BUMP OF CHICKEN announced that their song "Chronostasis" would be used as the theme song for the 25th Detective Conan movie, Detective Conan: The Bride of Halloween. The song was digitally released on April 11, 2023.

From July 2 to 3, 2023, BUMP OF CHICKEN held their first audience-attended concert in about 2 years and 8 months, BUMP OF CHICKEN LIVE 2022 Silver Jubilee at Makuhari Messe at Makuhari Messe International Exhibition Hall 9-11. The concert had originally been scheduled for February 10–11, 2023, but was postponed due to the COVID-19 pandemic. The rescheduled performances took place on July 2–3, 2023.

On July 3, 2023, the band launched their official TikTok account.

On September 15, 2023, it was announced that their song "SOUVENIR" would be used as the opening theme for the second season of the anime Spy×Family. The song was scheduled for digital release on September 29, 2023.

From October 24 to December 13, 2023, BUMP OF CHICKEN held their BUMP OF CHICKEN LIVE 2022 Silver Jubilee, performing 12 concerts at six live house venues across Japan.

On October 25, 2023, it was announced that a CD single for "SOUVENIR" and a live video release BUMP OF CHICKEN LIVE 2022 Silver Jubilee at Makuhari Messe would both be released on December 21, 2023, though this was later delayed to April 5, 2024. Additionally, the band announced their upcoming arena tour BUMP OF CHICKEN TOUR 2023 be there, set to begin in February 2024.

On March 31, 2024, BUMP OF CHICKEN appeared on NHK General TV’s BUMP OF CHICKEN 18 Matsuri, and the following day, April 1, 2024, their song "Mado no Naka Kara" performed on the program was digitally released in advance. On April 5, 2024, the song was included in the CD single SOUVENIR and the live video release BUMP OF CHICKEN LIVE 2022 Silver Jubilee at Makuhari Messe.

On May 24, 2024, the band released the live video BUMP OF CHICKEN LIVE 2022 Silver Jubilee at Zepp Haneda (Tokyo).

On May 28, 2024, BUMP OF CHICKEN launched their official app be there.

On December 11, 2024, BUMP OF CHICKEN released the song "Sleep Walking Orchestra", which was used as the opening theme for the anime Delicious in Dungeon.

On December 20, 2023, the band released the live video BUMP OF CHICKEN TOUR 2023 be there at Saitama Super Arena.

To mark their 28th anniversary, from February 11 to April 25, 2024, BUMP OF CHICKEN held a nationwide arena tour BUMP OF CHICKEN TOUR hōmushikku eisei 2024 (BUMP OF CHICKEN TOUR ホームシック衛星2024) as a revival of their 2008 orbital period tour, performing 16 concerts across eight venues and attracting 150,000 fans.

On April 15, 2024, the band released "Kaikou" as the theme song for the live-action Japanese film Onmyoji 0.

On July 31, 2024, "Strawberry" was released as the theme song for the TBS drama Ms. Saionji Doesn't Do Housework.

On April 25, 2024, the band announced the release of their tenth studio album Iris, scheduled for September 4, 2024, along with a dome tour BUMP OF CHICKEN TOUR 2024 Sphery Rendezvous to start in September 2024. On August 19, 2024, they added 10 additional concerts at halls and live houses, and on September 2, 2024, it was announced that Tokyo Dome performances would take place on December 7 and 8, 2024, marking their first Tokyo Dome shows in five years since BUMP OF CHICKEN TOUR 2019 aurora ark. The tour will consist of 19 performances at 10 venues across Japan.

=== 2025–present ===
On June 25, 2025, it was announced that BUMP OF CHICKEN's song "Ribbon", originally released in 2017, would be used as the Japanese ending theme for the Disney & Pixar film Elio, set to be released on August 1, 2025.

On September 27, 2025, it was revealed that BUMP OF CHICKEN would provide their new song "I" as the ending theme for the final season of the anime My Hero Academia, with the season scheduled to begin airing on October 4, 2025.

On November 14, 2025, the band is set to perform at the music event Wonderlivet 2025, held at Kintex Hall 7, 8, and 10 in South Korea, where they will be the headliner for the first day of the event.

On October 15, 2025, BUMP OF CHICKEN released the digital-only single "I".

== Band members ==
=== Motoo Fujiwara ===
Motoo Fujiwara (藤原 基央, Fujiwara Motō) is the composer, lyricist, rhythm guitarist, and main vocalist of the group. He has written most of the music, and has also drawn the artwork for their albums THE LIVING DEAD and Yggdrasil. In March 2006, he released a solo album entitled Song for Tales of the Abyss, which included "Karma" and instrumental versions of songs from the game Tales of the Abyss. In August 2020, Fujiwara got married.

- Birth date: April 12, 1979 (age 47)
- Birthplace: Sakura, Chiba Prefecture
- Position: composer/lyricist/vocalist/rhythm guitarist

=== Hiroaki Masukawa ===
Masukawa Hiroaki (増川 弘明) is the guitarist of the group, and also writes most of the hidden joke tracks for albums. His nicknames within the band are "Hiro", "Hose", (meaning "very thin"), and "Nikke".

- Birth date: December 20, 1979 (age 46)
- Birthplace: Sakura, Chiba Prefecture
- Position: lead guitarist

=== Yoshifumi Naoi ===
Naoi Yoshifumi (直井 由文) is the bassist of the group, and is referred to as the "crowd pleaser". He has released an artbook containing his works, and helped with some album artwork. His nickname within the band is "Chama", a play on the Japanese phrase "Obotchama" referring to a rich family's son.

On September 18, 2020, an article was published detailing an affair he had in 2016 and 2017 while hiding the fact that he was married and a father. Later the same day, he published an apology for his behavior, and announced that he would be taking a break from music. On June 6, 2021, he published yet another, longer apology for the same incident, at the same time announcing his return to the band.

- Birth date: October 9, 1979 (age 47)
- Birthplace: Sakura, Chiba Prefecture
- Position: bassist

=== Hideo Masu ===
Masu Hideo (升 秀夫) is the drummer for the band.

- Birth date: August 10, 1979 (age 47)
- Birthplace: Sakura, Chiba Prefecture
- Position: drummer

== Musical influence ==
The bands that all members of BUMP OF CHICKEN shared an affinity for include Green Day, Nirvana, The Stone Roses, and The Pogues. They also listen to 1990s electronic music, citing artists such as The Chemical Brothers, The Prodigy, Aphex Twin, and Underworld.

Fujiwara has stated that he watched MTV from a very young age and generally liked most of the popular musicians of that era. Among those he listened to frequently were Billy Joel, Michael Jackson, Cinderella, Poison, Whitesnake, Def Leppard, Skid Row, and Aerosmith. During junior high school, he was introduced to The Beatles by a friend, and in high school he became increasingly drawn to hard rock. He has said that he played cover versions of Metallica’s "Enter Sandman" and songs by Guns N' Roses.

He later described enjoying the process of "digging deeper" into the roots of the genres he liked at the time, such as hard rock, melodic hardcore, and Britpop. Through this process, he discovered artists and styles including neo-acoustic pop, Paul Weller, and Zakk Wylde. He has noted that the impact of Pride & Glory was particularly significant for him, which led him to explore Southern rock in greater depth, including artists such as Lynyrd Skynyrd, The Mamas & the Papas, and The Allman Brothers Band. In terms of guitar style, he has cited Zakk Wylde as his hero. He also listens to Irish traditional and bluegrass compilation albums, as well as artists such as Jackson Browne.

Naoi has stated that he was initially drawn to punk rock through Green Day, and later listened to shoegaze bands such as Pixies. Regarding the band's wide range of musical influences, he commented, "What Fujiwara brings to us is genreless and borderless. Because of that, we try to keep our antennas up for all kinds of cool music as much as possible".

== Production structure ==
BUMP OF CHICKEN's management office is Longfellow. The company was formerly operated as a limited company under the Hip Land Group, but ceased business operations in 2022. Since then, it has continued to function as an artist label within Toy's Factory, the record label with which the band has been affiliated since 2000.

Artist management is handled by Hiroaki Takahashi, who previously wrote a column titled TAKAHASHI DIARY on the band's official website. The title was derived from the diary planners published by Takahashi Shoten.

The band's former producer MOR had long been responsible for music production and co-arrangement. However, beginning with the song "I," released in 2025, production credits have been listed solely under the band name, and MOR is no longer credited.

The band's logo design and the jacket artwork for singles released since Planetarium have been created by design studios such as Tycoon Graphics and VERDY.

Nearly all music videos released from the band's major debut through "Hello, world!" (2015) were directed by video creator Shuichi Banba. He also handled the visual production for released live videos and the visual segments of the video work Ningyō Geki Guild. Additionally, he served as the director for NHK’s program Super Live in early 2005.

At the Space Shower Music Video Awards, the band won the fan-voted "BEST YOUR CHOICE" award in 2004, 2005, 2008, and 2014 for the music videos "Lost Man," "Sharin no Uta," "Hana no Na," and "Niji o Matsu Hito," respectively. "Hana no Na" additionally won Best Video of the Year and Best Group Video, marking the first-ever triple win in a single year.

According to a 2005 interview, the band has not produced a single unreleased or "discarded" song since their debut. In other words, every song brought to recording by Fujiwara has been released in some form.

For the singles associated with the 2010 album COSMONAUT, the band did not compose songs specifically for single releases, but instead selected singles from existing album material. As a result, except for "R.I.P." and "Merry Christmas," many singles experienced significant delays between composition and release. For example, "HAPPY" was written in November 2008 but was not released as a single until April 2010, a gap of approximately 17 months.

In magazine interviews, Fujiwara has explained his philosophy on coupling tracks, stating:

"A coupling exists because it pairs with the single. The two songs on a single are a couple. That's why the coupling track belongs exactly where it is, and that's how I think when composing—I believe the songs want that too."

As a result, coupling tracks were generally not included on albums (the sole exception being "Battlecry," originally from the out-of-print Lamp single and later included on FLAME VEIN +1). In 2008, the band released a compilation album of coupling tracks titled present from you, explaining that they were disappointed that such songs were often dismissed as mere extras and overlooked by listeners.

While excluding coupling tracks from albums is common practice in the music industry, the band's release pace of CD singles declined sharply after 2012, with most releases issued as double or triple A-sides. Consequently, as of July 2022, the last newly produced coupling track was "Honto no Honto," included with the 2012 single "firefly."

Since their major debut, the band has increasingly devoted extended periods to songwriting, often requiring several years to complete a single album. Because most singles are eventually included on studio albums, significant time gaps frequently occur between single and album releases. For example, Yggdrasil was released 1 year and 8 months after its first single "Snow Smile," orbital period followed "Planetarium" after 2 years and 5 months, RAY followed "Tomodachi no Uta" after 3 years and 1 month, aurora arc followed "Aria" after 2 years and 11 months, and Iris followed "Gravity" after 4 years.

In July 2019, streaming distribution began for all studio recordings released since 1999.

Fujiwara has described the band's ideal recording approach as follows:

"We want to record things that make your nose sting a little—like the smell of the road we walked home together, or the scenery we saw side by side. Capturing that sense of shared memory is what feels closest to ideal for us right now".

== Recorded materials ==
Most released recordings by BUMP OF CHICKEN are produced in half-down tuning, in which all strings on the guitar and bass are tuned a semitone lower than standard tuning. Some songs, however, employ alternative tunings, including "asgard" and "midgard" from Yggdrasil, as well as "Mitsuboshi Quartet" and "beautiful glider" from COSMONAUT.

With the exception of the single "Smile," all CDs, videos, DVDs, certain official scorebooks, and the official app contain hidden tracks or hidden artwork. In these hidden tracks, unlike regular releases, all band members typically participate in the songwriting process, particularly in writing lyrics. Although hidden tracks were previously available on karaoke services, they are no longer distributed at the band's request.

Some CD releases include a hidden jacket, in which removing the plastic disc tRAY from the CD case reveals printed lyrics for the hidden track underneath. Certain DVD and Blu-RAY releases also feature alternate artwork printed on the reverse side of the outer jacket. In addition, the band's official app BOC-AR contains unlisted hidden elements.

All performances on hidden tracks are played by members of BUMP OF CHICKEN, although some tracks are credited under alternate names.

== Official application ==
The official application is titled "be there" and was released on May 28, 2023.

The app was jointly planned and developed by Inbstyle Group (Instyle Publisheing) and teamLab. teamLab has previously worked with the band on music video production—most notably for "Aria"—as well as on live concert staging. In addition, the band's official website, which was renewed simultaneously with the release of the app, was also designed and developed by teamLab.

=== Main features and content ===
- Live Music
- Meet Nicole
- Music
- Movie

The Music and Movie sections are available exclusively to paid members under the "be there more" subscription.

== Songs in popular culture ==
Their single "Arue" is a song dedicated to the fictional character Rei Ayanami, from the anime series Neon Genesis Evangelion. The song is listed as R.A., the initials of the aforementioned character.

Their song "sailing day" is used at the end credits of the animated film One Piece The Movie: Dead End no Bōken. The same song is also featured in the Guitar Freaks and Drummania series of arcade games.

The songs "Tentai Kansoku", "K", "sailing day", "Karma" and "Mayday" were later used in the musical arcade game by Bemani in GuitarFreaks, DrumMania, Jubeat, Reflec Beat Limelight and Pop'n Music. "Tentai Kansoku" was also featured in Metcha! Taiko no Tatsujin DS: Nanatsu no Shima no Daibouken. "Tentai Kansoku" and "Karma" were also featured as covers by the band Afterglow in the mobile game for BanG Dream!.

The song "Karma" from their "supernova / Karma" single is the main theme for Namco's Tales of the Abyss video game. It also is used in the anime adaptation of the game as the opening theme.

The movie Doraemon: Nobita and the New Steel Troops—Winged Angels released on March 5, 2011, uses BUMP OF CHICKEN's song "Tomodachi no Uta" as its ending song. All 4 members have praised Doraemon for its characters and story, saying it is "unique" and "loving". They feel that it is "an honor" to be chosen to sing for the new Doraemon movie.

The song "Hello, world!" from their "Hello World! / Colony" single is used as the opening song of the TV anime adaptation of the manga Blood Blockade Battlefront. The song is also available as a playable song in the rhythm game Hatsune Miku: Colorful Stage!, where it is performed by Leo/need, a fictional band featured in the game.

Their song "Zero" was also featured as the opening song for Final Fantasy Type-0.

Their songs are used as the opening and closing themes for episodes 1-11 of the anime, March Comes in like a Lion (3月のライオン). The opening is "Answer", while the closing is "Fighter". Around 2014, before the manga was adapted into an anime, they and the manga's author, Chika Umino, collaborated to make a CGI music video set to their single, "Fighter". The video was made into a stand-alone story promoting the original manga, called March Comes in Like a Lion Meets BUMP OF CHICKEN. In early April 2017 they posted a long form music video for Answer to YouTube.

Their song "GO" was featured as the opening song for the 2017 anime adaptation of the Japanese mobile game, Granblue Fantasy.

Their songs "Sirius" and "Spica" are the opening and closing theme songs respectively for Satelight's (Shoji Kawamori) anime Juushinki Pandora, released in 2018.

Their song "Gekkou" was used as the opening song for the 2018 TV anime adaptation of the manga Karakuri Circus.

Their song "Acacia" was used in a music video collaboration with the Pokémon franchise.

Their song "Chronostasis" was used for Detective Conan: The Bride of Halloween (Meitantei Conan: Halloween no Hanayome), the 25th anime film in the Detective Conan franchise.

Rie Takahashi performed a cover of the group's song "Tentai Kansoku" as the second ending theme music for Teasing Master Takagi-san: The Movie (2022) during its second week of release.

Their song "SOUVENIR" was featured as the opening song for the 2022 anime adaptation of the manga Spy × Family. Specifically, it was the opening song for the 2nd cour of the series' first season.

In 2022, they were the featured artists in NHK's Juhachi Fes (18fes). They wrote and released their song "Madononakakara" for this event, which was eventually included in their 2024 album Iris.

Their song "Sleep Walking Orchestra" was featured as the opening song for the 2024 anime adaptation of the manga Delicious in Dungeon.

Their single "Mayday" was used in the Transformers 40th Anniversary Special Movie by Studio Trigger in 2024.

Their song "I" was featured as the ending theme song for the final season of My Hero Academia.

== Live Performance ==
=== Live Tour ===
Performance date	Performance Name	Venue	Remarks
March 27, 2000 – April 16, 2000	Tour Pokiil	7 Venues 7 Performances March 27 Chiba LIVE SPOT LOOK March 29 – Sendai Bee Base Basement Theater, Miyagi April 2 – DRUM Be-1, Fukuoka April 3 – NEOPOLIS Hall, Hiroshima April 5 – Fandango, Juso (Osaka) April 6 – Electric Lady Land, Aichi April 16 – Club 251, Shimokitazawa (Tokyo)	
July 23, 2000, July 27, 2000	Summer Pokiil 2	2 Venues 2 Performances July 23 – Shinsaibashi, Osaka CLUB QUATTRO July 27 – Shibuya, Tokyo CLUB QUATTRO	
September 23, 2000 – October 1, 2000	Pro Pokiil Autumn	2 Venues 4 Performances September 23 – Chiba LIVE SPOT LOOK September 24 – Chiba LIVE SPOT LOOK September 30 – Shimokitazawa, Tokyo Club 251 October 1 – Shimokitazawa, Tokyo Club 251	Major debut single "Diamond" release commemorative tour.
March 23, 2001 – April 15, 2001	Star Poking Tours 2001	11 Venues 12 Performances March 23 – Chiba LIVE SPOT LOOK March 26 – Sapporo, Hokkaido PENNY LANE 24 March 28 – Sendai, Miyagi CLUB JUNK BOX March 29 – Niigata, Niigata PHASE March 31 – Aichi Electric Lady Land April 1 – Kobe Chicken George, Hyogo April 3 – Namiki Junction, Hiroshima April 4 – Fukuoka, Fukuoka DRUM LOGOS April 6 – Osaka BIGCAT April 14 – Tokyo 渋谷ON AIR EAST April 15 – Shibuya, Tokyo ON AIR EAST April 22 – TokyoSHIBUYA-AX	
July 21, 2001 – September 20, 2001	Surf Porkin'	16 Venue 23 Performances July 21 – Chiba LIVE SPOT LOOK July 22 – Yokohama Bay Hall, Kanagawa August 6 – Aichi Electric Lady Land August 7 – Aichi Electoric Lady Land August 9 – Kobe Chicken George, Hyogo August 10 – Kyoto KYOTO MUSE August 12 – Kanazawa, Ishikawa AZ August 22 – Kumamoto, Kumamoto Django August 24 – Fukuoka, Fukuoka DRUM LOGOS August 25 – Fukuoka, Fukuoka DRUM LOGOS August 27 – Namiki Junction, Hiroshima August 28 – Namiki Junction, Hiroshima August 30 – Okayama PEPPERLAND September 2 – Niigata, Niigata PHASE September 5 – Sapporo, Hokkaido PENNY LANE 24 September 6 – Sapporo, Hokkaido PENNY LANE 24 September 9 – Sendai, Miyagi CLUB JUNK BOX September 10 – Sendai, Miyagi CLUB JUNK BOX September 12 – Koriyama, Fukushima Hip Shot Japan September 14 – Matsushita IMP Hall, Osaka September 15 – Matsushita IMP Hall, Osaka September 19 – Akasaka BLITZ, Tokyo September 20 – Akasaka BLITZ, Tokyo	
January 28, 2002, February 2, 2002	Pokiretsu Encyclopedia	2 Venues 2 Performances January 28 – Akasaka, Tokyo BLITZ February 2 – Osaka Zepp Osaka	Super Butter Dog and The Groovers performed at the Akasaka concert, while Super Butter Dog and Mo'Some Tonebender performed at the Osaka concert.
March 23, 2002 – April 21, 2002	Pokista 21	9 Venues 13 Performances March 23 – Akasaka, Tokyo BLITZ March 24 – Akasaka, Tokyo BLITZ March 26 – Hokkaido Zepp Sapporo March 28 – Miyagi Zepp Sendai March 31 – Niigata, Niigata PHASE April 2 – Club Diamond Hall, Aichi April 3 – Club Diamond Hall, Aichi April 5 – Fukuoka Zepp Fukuoka April 6 – Hiroshima, Hiroshima CLUB QUATTRO April 13 – Osaka Zepp Osaka April 14 – Osaka Zepp Osaka April 20 – Tokyo Zepp Tokyo April 21 – Tokyo Zepp Tokyo	Tour in conjunction with the release of the original album jupiter.
August 7, 2002 – August 23, 2002	Bauxite page 1	3 Venues 3 Performances August 7 – Miyagi Zepp Sendai August 21 – CLUB CITTA’ Kawasaki, Kanagawa August 23 – Kochi, Kochi BAY5 SQUARE	A co-headlining tour organized by BUMP OF CHICKEN, featuring syrup16g, Huckleberry Finn, and Burger Nuds.
December 3, 2002 – December 18, 2002	Love&Porkin	5 Venues 7 Performances December 3 – Club Diamond Hall, Aichi December 5 – Fukuoka Zepp Fukuoka December 9 – Namba Hatch, Osaka December 10 – Namba Hatch, Osaka December 13 – Zepp Tokyo, Tokyo December 14 – Zepp Tokyo, Tokyo December 18 – Zepp Sapporo, Hokkaido	The single "Snow Smile" was released on the final day of the tour.
May 13, 2003 – June 15, 2003	Ninja Porking	16 Venues 18 Performances May 13 – Yokohama Bay Hall, Kanagawa May 14 – Kiryu City Cultural Center, Gunma May 17 – BAY5 AQUARE, Kochi May 19 – Hiroshima CLUB QUATTRO, Hiroshima May 20 – Kobe Chicken George, Hyogo May 22 – Oita T.O.P.S, Oita May 23 – Zepp Fukuoka, Fukuoka May 28 – Kanazawa EIGHT HALL, Ishikawa May 30 – Kyoto Kita Bunka Kaikan, Kyoto May 31 – Gifu Modern Cafe Club, Gifu June 2 – Zepp Osaka, Osaka June 3 – Zepp Osaka, Osaka June 5 – Niigata LOTS, Niigata June 7 – Zepp Sendai, Miyagi June 8 – Aomori Quarter, Aomori June 11 – Akasaka BLITZ, Tokyo June 12 – Akasaka BLITZ, Tokyo June 15 – Club SWINDLE, Akita	A nationwide tour in conjunction with the release of the single "Lost Man / sailing day".
May 29, 2004	Bump day Free Live	1 Venue 1 Performance May 29 – Sakura City Gymnasium, Chiba	A free live concert (by invitation only). During this event, there was an incident where the gymnasium floor collapsed.
September 17, 2004 – November 20, 2004	My Pegasus	22 Venue 31 Performances September 17 – Zepp Tokyo, Tokyo September 18 – Zepp Tokyo, Tokyo September 23 – Zepp Fukuoka, Fukuoka September 24 – Zepp Fukuoka, Fukuoka September 26 – Zepp Osaka, Osaka September 27 – Zepp Osaka, Osaka September 29 – Club Diamond Hall, Aichi September 30 – Club Diamond Hall, Aichi October 4 – Zepp Sapporo, Hokkaido October 5 – Zepp Sapporo, Hokkaido October 7 – Zepp Sendai, Miyagi October 8 – Zepp Sendai, Miyagi October 12 – Namba Hatch, Osaka October 13 – Namba Hatch, Osaka October 15 – Kyoto City Kita Bunka Kaikan, Kyoto October 18 – Club Diamond Hall, Aichi October 19 – Club Diamond Hall, Aichi October 21 – Hiroshima CLUB QUATTRO, Hiroshima October 22 – CLUB CITTA’ Kawasaki, Kanagawa October 25 – CAPARAVO Hall, Kagoshima October 26 – Kumamoto DRUM Be-9, Kumamoto October 28 – Oita DRUM TOP’S, Oita October 29 – Nagasaki DRUM Be-9, Nagasaki November 1 – Kobe Chicken George, Hyogo November 2 – BAY5 SQUARE, Kochi November 4 – Camellia Hall, Matsuyama Community Center, Ehime November 5 – Okayama Actron, Okayama November 8 – Hip Shot Japan, Koriyama, Fukushima November 9 – Aomori Quarter, Aomori November 12 – Niigata PHASE, Niigata November 13 – Kanazawa EIGHT HALL, Ishikawa November 20 – Dance Club Matsushita, Okinawa	A nationwide tour in conjunction with the release of the original album Yggdrasil.
December 11, 2004, December 12, 2004	Pegasus YOU	1 Venue 2 Performances December 11 – Makuhari Messe International Exhibition Halls 9–11, Chiba December 12 – Makuhari Messe International Exhibition Halls 9–11, Chiba	The final performance of the nationwide tour "MY PEGASUS". The concert on December 11 was broadcast on NHK.
August 10, 2005	Live at Planetarium	1 Venue 1 Performance August 10 – Aichi Expo (Expo 2005) Sasashima Satellite Venue, Aichi	A collaborative event with planetarium creator Takayuki Ohira. The event was held by invitation only for 200 people, with approximately 70,000 applications flooding in.
January 13, 2006 – March 5, 2006	run rabbit run	9 Venues, 16 Performances January 13 – Zepp Sapporo, Hokkaido January 14 – Zepp Sapporo, Hokkaido January 17 – Zepp Sendai, Miyagi January 18 – Zepp Sendai, Miyagi January 20 – Niigata PHASE, Niigata January 21 – Niigata PHASE, Niigata January 28 – Makuhari Messe International Exhibition Halls 9–11, Chiba January 29 – Makuhari Messe International Exhibition Halls 9–11, Chiba February 3 – Hiroshima Sun Plaza Hall, Hiroshima February 7 – Osaka-jō Hall, Osaka February 8 – Osaka-jō Hall, Osaka February 11 – Marine Messe Fukuoka, Fukuoka February 12 – Marine Messe Fukuoka, Fukuoka February 15 – Nagoya Rainbow Hall, Aichi March 4 – Yoyogi National Gymnasium (1st Gymnasium), Tokyo March 5 – Yoyogi National Gymnasium (1st Gymnasium), Tokyo	A nationwide tour in conjunction with the release of the single "supernova / Karma".
January 10, 2008 – February 13, 2008	Homeship Satellite	20 Venues 22 Performances January 10 – Zepp Tokyo, Tokyo January 11 – Zepp Tokyo, Tokyo January 14 – MEGA STONE, Obihiro, Hokkaido January 15 – CASINO DRIVE, Asahikawa, Hokkaido January 18 – Aomori Quarter, Aomori January 19 – Club SWINDLE, Akita January 21 – Morioka CLUB CHANGE WAVE, Iwate January 22 – Hip Shot Japan, Koriyama, Fukushima January 24 – MAIRO, Toyama, Toyama January 25 – Hibiki Hall, Fukui January 27 – KBS Hall, Kyoto January 28 – KBS Hall, Kyoto January 30 – Camellia Hall, Matsuyama Community Center, Ehime January 31 – BAY5 SQUARE, Kochi February 2 – CRAZYMAMA KINGDOM, Okayama February 3 – BELIER, Yonago, Tottori February 6 – CAPARVO Hall, Kagoshima February 7 – BATTLE-STAGE, Kumamoto February 9 – OITA-T.O.P.S Bitts Hall, Oita February 10 – NCC & Studio, Nagasaki February 12 – Zepp Nagoya, Aichi February 13 – EVENTHALL club-G, Gifu	The first leg of the nationwide tour in two years. A nationwide live house tour in conjunction with the release of the original album orbital period.
February 23, 2008 – July 5, 2008	Homeship Satellite	13 Venues 19 Performances February 23 – Makuhari Messe International Exhibition Halls 9–11, Chiba February 24 – Makuhari Messe International Exhibition Halls 9–11, Chiba March 6 – Osaka-jō Hall, Osaka March 7 – Osaka-jō Hall, Osaka March 17 – Nippon Gaishi Hall, Nagoya March 18 – Nippon Gaishi Hall, Nagoya March 22 – Hot House Super Arena (Grande 21), Sendai April 5 – Ishikawa Prefectural Industrial Exhibition Hall No. 4, Kanazawa April 12 – Toki Messe Niigata Convention Center, Niigata April 19 – Hokkaido Prefectural Sports Center "Kitaeru", Sapporo April 29 – Hiroshima Green Arena, Hiroshima May 5 – Marine Messe Fukuoka, Fukuoka May 6 – Marine Messe Fukuoka, Fukuoka May 10 – Ecopa Arena, Shizuoka May 17 – Saitama Super Arena, Saitama May 18 – Saitama Super Arena, Saitama May 30 – Osaka-jō Hall, Osaka May 31 – Osaka-jō Hall, Osaka July 5 – Ginowan Seaside Park Outdoor Theater, Okinawa	The second leg of the nationwide tour in two years. A nationwide arena tour in conjunction with the release of the original album orbital period. The performance on May 18 in Saitama was broadcast as a special program on NHK.
April 10, 2010	BUMP OF CHICKEN Secret	1 Venue 1 Performance April 10 – Roppongi Hills Arena (Special Venue), Tokyo	"HAPPY" was performed for the first time. The location was only announced as a certain place in Tokyo, and the exact details were not revealed until 1 p.m. on the day of the event. Despite this, approximately 2,000 people gathered at the venue.
December 5, 2011 – January 31, 2012	Good Glider Tour	15 Venues 19 Performances -2011- December 5 – SHIBUYA-AX, Tokyo December 6 – SHIBUYA-AX, Tokyo December 9 – LOTS, Niigata December 12 – Zepp Sendai, Sendai December 15 – Zepp Sapporo, Sapporo December 17 – CLUB CHANGE WAVE, Morioka December 18 – HIPSHOT JAPAN, Koriyama -2012- January 7 – BAY5 SQUARE, Kochi January 9 – BLUE LIVE, Hiroshima January 11 – Zepp Nagoya, Nagoya January 12 – Zepp Nagoya, Nagoya January 14 – NCC & Studio, Nagasaki January 15 – DRUM Be-9 V1, Kumamoto January 18 – Zepp Fukuoka, Fukuoka January 21 – Music Town Otoichiba, Okinawa January 25 – Zepp Osaka, Osaka January 26 – Zepp Osaka, Osaka January 30 – Zepp Tokyo, Tokyo January 31 – Zepp Tokyo, Tokyo	The first leg of the nationwide tour held after approximately three and a half years. A nationwide live house tour in conjunction with the release of the original album COSMONAUT, which was released a year prior to the tour.
April 7, 2012 – July 14, 2012	GOLD GLIDER TOUR	13 Venues 20 Performances April 7 – Makuhari Messe International Exhibition Halls 9–11, Chiba April 8 – Makuhari Messe International Exhibition Halls 9–11, Chiba April 24 – Osaka-jō Hall, Osaka April 25 – Osaka-jō Hall, Osaka May 3 – Ishikawa Prefectural Industrial Exhibition Hall No. 4, Kanazawa May 6 – Toki Messe Niigata Convention Center, Niigata May 12 – Hokkaido Prefectural Sports Center "Kitaeru", Sapporo May 19 – Asty Tokushima, Tokushima May 26 – Hiroshima Green Arena, Hiroshima June 2 – Marine Messe Fukuoka, Fukuoka June 9 – Ecopa Arena, Shizuoka June 20 – World Memorial Hall, Kobe June 21 – World Memorial Hall, Kobe June 26 – Nippon Gaishi Hall, Nagoya June 27 – Nippon Gaishi Hall, Nagoya July 3 – Yoyogi National Gymnasium (1st Gymnasium), Tokyo July 4 – Yoyogi National Gymnasium (1st Gymnasium), Tokyo July 7 – Yoyogi National Gymnasium (1st Gymnasium), Tokyo July 8 – Yoyogi National Gymnasium (1st Gymnasium), Tokyo July 14 – Sekisui Heim Super Arena (Grande 21), Miyagi	The second leg of the nationwide tour held after approximately three and a half years. A nationwide arena tour in conjunction with the release of the original album COSMONAUT, which was released a year and a half before the tour. A DVD/Blu-RAY featuring the performance at the National Yoyogi Stadium First Gymnasium on July 3 was released (this live video release was the first in the band's history).
August 9, 2013	Best Album Release Commemorative Live	1 Venue 1 Performance August 9 – QVC Marine Field, Chiba	The entire live performance was streamed live on YouTube. Later, this live performance was included in the bonus DVD of the album RAY. It was the band's first live performance to feature the use of "Zylo Band" (LED wristbands) as part of the stage production. Since then, similar effects have been used in most of their live performances.
September 9, 2013 – October 29, 2013	BUMP OF CHICKEN 2013 Tour 「WILLPOLIS」	7 Venues 11 Performances September 9 – Nippon Gaishi Hall, Aichi September 10 – Nippon Gaishi Hall, Aichi September 16 – Marine Messe Fukuoka, Fukuoka September 25 – Yokohama Arena, Kanagawa September 26 – Yokohama Arena, Kanagawa October 12 – Sekisui Heim Super Arena (Grande 21), Miyagi October 16 – Osaka-jō Hall, Osaka October 17 – Osaka-jō Hall, Osaka October 24 – Hokkaido Prefectural Sports Center "Kitaeru", Hokkaido October 28 – Nippon Budokan, Tokyo October 29 – Nippon Budokan, Tokyo	A nationwide arena tour in conjunction with the release of the best album.
April 5, 2014 – July 6, 2014	BUMP OF CHICKEN WILLPOLIS 2014	12 Venue 19 Performances April 5 – Makuhari Messe International Exhibition Halls 9–11, Chiba April 6 – Makuhari Messe International Exhibition Halls 9–11, Chiba April 17 – Nippon Gaishi Hall, Aichi April 18 – Nippon Gaishi Hall, Aichi April 26 – Ishikawa Prefectural Industrial Exhibition Hall No. 4, Ishikawa May 3 – Toki Messe Niigata Convention Center, Niigata May 10 – Marine Messe Fukuoka, Fukuoka May 11 – Marine Messe Fukuoka, Fukuoka May 17 – Ecopa Arena, Shizuoka May 24 – Asty Tokushima, Tokushima May 31 – Hokkaido Prefectural Sports Center "Kitaeru", Hokkaido June 1 – Hokkaido Prefectural Sports Center "Kitaeru", Hokkaido June 7 – Hiroshima Green Arena, Hiroshima June 8 – Hiroshima Green Arena, Hiroshima June 14 – Sekisui Heim Super Arena (Grande 21), Miyagi June 15 – Sekisui Heim Super Arena (Grande 21), Miyagi June 23 – Intex Osaka Hall 5, Osaka June 24 – Intex Osaka Hall 5, Osaka July 6 – Okinawa Convention Center Exhibition Hall, Okinawa	A nationwide arena tour in conjunction with the release of the original album RAY.
June 28, 2014	BUMP OF CHICKEN LIVE in Taiwan 2014	1 Venue 1 Performance June 28 – Legacy Taipei, Taiwan	It was their first performance in Taiwan.
July 15, 2014	BUMP OF CHICKEN LIVE at Studio Coast	1 Venue 1 Performance ~~March 31 – STUDIO COAST, Shin-Kiba (Tokyo)~~ (Postponed) July 15 – STUDIO COAST, Shin-Kiba (Tokyo) (Rescheduled show)	It was originally scheduled to be held on March 31, but was postponed due to Fujiwara's pneumothorax.
July 31, 2014	BUMP OF CHICKEN TOUR WILLPOLIS 2014 Final	1 Venue 1 Performance July 31 – Tokyo Dome, Tokyo	The final performance of the "WILLPOLIS 2014" tour. It was their first performance at the Tokyo Dome. Additionally, the new song "You were here" was performed for the first time. The entire event was released as a documentary film for a limited two-week screening. It was also later released as a documentary video for general sale.
July 30, 2015 – August 4, 2015	BUMP OF CHICKEN Special Live 2015	2 Venues 2 Performances July 30 – Intex Osaka Hall 5, Osaka August 4 – Yokohama Arena, Kanagawa	A live performance exclusive to buyers of the 24th single "Hello, world! / Colony", released on April 22, 2015. During the August 4th performance at Yokohama Arena, the band held their first-ever live viewing. The footage of this performance was included in the bonus disc of the first edition of Butterflies.
February 11, 2016	BUMP OF CHICKEN 20th Anniversary Special Live "20"	1 Venue 1 Performance February 11 – Makuhari Messe International Exhibition Halls 9–11, Chiba	The band held their first-ever anniversary live performance to commemorate their formation.
April 9, 2016 – July 17, 2016	BUMP OF CHICKEN Stadium Tour 2016 "BFLY"	4 Venues 6 Performances April 9 – Kyocera Dome Osaka, Osaka April 10 – Kyocera Dome Osaka, Osaka May 8 – Vantelin Dome Nagoya, Aichi May 22 – Mizuho PayPay Dome Fukuoka, Fukuoka July 16 – Nissan Stadium, Kanagawa July 17 – Nissan Stadium, Kanagawa	The band's first-ever stadium tour, held after the release of the original album Butterflies. The new song "Aria" was performed for the first time at the Nissan Stadium concert.
September 16, 2017 – March 18, 2018	BUMP OF CHICKEN TOUR 2017–2018 PATHFINDER	16 Venues 29 Performances -2017- September 16 – Makuhari Messe International Exhibition Halls 1–3, Chiba September 17 – Makuhari Messe International Exhibition Halls 1–3, Chiba September 23 – Hokkaido Prefectural Sports Center "Kitaeru", Hokkaido September 24 – Hokkaido Prefectural Sports Center "Kitaeru", Hokkaido October 3 – Toki Messe Niigata Convention Center, Niigata October 8 – Ecopa Arena, Shizuoka October 9 – Ecopa Arena, Shizuoka October 24 – Zepp Nagoya, Aichi October 25 – Zepp Nagoya, Aichi October 31 – Osaka-jō Hall, Osaka November 1 – Osaka-jō Hall, Osaka November 8 – STUDIO COAST, Shin-Kiba (Tokyo) November 9 – STUDIO COAST, Shin-Kiba (Tokyo) November 18 – Hiroshima Green Arena, Hiroshima November 19 – Hiroshima Green Arena, Hiroshima November 27 – Zepp Osaka Bayside, Osaka November 28 – Zepp Osaka Bayside, Osaka December 9 – Sekisui Heim Super Arena, Miyagi December 10 – Sekisui Heim Super Arena, Miyagi December 16 – Ishikawa Prefectural Industrial Exhibition Hall No. 4, Ishikawa December 26 – Asty Tokushima, Tokushima -2018- January 10 – Nippon Gaishi Hall, Aichi January 11 – Nippon Gaishi Hall, Aichi January 16 – World Memorial Hall, Hyogo January 17 – World Memorial Hall, Hyogo ~~January 27 – Marine Messe Fukuoka, Fukuoka~~ (Postponed) ~~January 28 – Marine Messe Fukuoka, Fukuoka~~ (Postponed) February 10 – Saitama Super Arena, Saitama February 11 – Saitama Super Arena, Saitama March 17 – Marine Messe Fukuoka, Fukuoka (Rescheduled show) March 18 – Marine Messe Fukuoka, Fukuoka (Rescheduled show)	Many songs were performed, ranging from newly released tracks after the release of "Butterflies" to songs that hadn't been performed for several years. The Fukuoka concert was postponed from the originally scheduled January 27 and 28 to March 17 and 18th due to Fujiwara contracting the flu (influenza).
July 12, 2019 – November 4, 2019	BUMP OF CHICKEN TOUR 2019 aurora ark	9 Venues 18 Performances July 12 – Belluna Dome, Saitama July 13 – Belluna Dome, Saitama July 23 – Zepp Fukuoka, Fukuoka July 24 – Zepp Fukuoka, Fukuoka July 31 – SENDAI GIGS, Miyagi August 1 – SENDAI GIGS, Miyagi August 20 – STUDIO COAST, Shin-Kiba (Tokyo) August 21 – STUDIO COAST, Shin-Kiba (Tokyo) September 11 – Kyocera Dome Osaka, Osaka September 12 – Kyocera Dome Osaka, Osaka September 21 – Vantelin Dome Nagoya, Aichi September 22 – Vantelin Dome Nagoya, Aichi October 1 – Zepp Osaka Bayside, Osaka October 2 – Zepp Osaka Bayside, Osaka October 15 – Zepp Sapporo, Hokkaido October 16 – Zepp Sapporo, Hokkaido November 3 – Tokyo Dome, Tokyo November 4 – Tokyo Dome, Tokyo	A nationwide tour in conjunction with the release of the original album aurora arc. The tour included their first dome performance in three years.
July 2, 2022 – July 3, 2022	BUMP OF CHICKEN LIVE 2022 Silver Jubilee at Makuhari Messe 02/10-11	1 Venues 2 Performances ~~February 10 – Makuhari Messe International Exhibition Halls 9–11, Chiba~~ (Postponed) ~~February 11 – Makuhari Messe International Exhibition Halls 9–11, Chiba~~ (Postponed) July 2 – Makuhari Messe International Exhibition Halls 9–11, Chiba (Rescheduled show) July 3 – Makuhari Messe International Exhibition Halls 9–11, Chiba (Rescheduled show)	A live performance with an audience, marking the band's 25th anniversary, their first in approximately 2 years and 8 months. In response to the COVID-19 pandemic, the originally scheduled dates of February 10 and 11 were postponed to July 2 and 3.
October 24, 2022 – December 13, 2022	BUMP OF CHICKEN TOUR 2022 Silver Jubilee	6 Venues 12 Performances October 24 – SENDAI GIGS, Miyagi October 25 – SENDAI GIGS, Miyagi October 31 – Zepp Sapporo, Hokkaido November 1 – Zepp Sapporo, Hokkaido November 14 – Zepp Osaka Bayside, Osaka November 15 – Zepp Osaka Bayside, Osaka November 21 – Zepp Fukuoka, Fukuoka November 22 – Zepp Fukuoka, Fukuoka November 28 – Zepp Nagoya, Aichi November 29 – Zepp Nagoya, Aichi December 12 – Zepp Haneda (TOKYO), Tokyo December 13 – Zepp Haneda (TOKYO), Tokyo	A tour commemorating the band's 25th anniversary, their first in approximately 3 years. All performances were held at live houses. Many songs were performed, ranging from new tracks released after the release of "aurora arc" to songs that hadn't been performed for several years.
February 11, 2023 – May 28, 2023	BUMP OF CHICKEN TOUR 2023 be there	11 Venues 20 Performances February 11 – Ariake Arena, Tokyo February 12 – Ariake Arena, Tokyo February 18 – Marine Messe Fukuoka A Hall, Fukuoka February 19 – Marine Messe Fukuoka A Hall, Fukuoka March 1 – Osaka-jō Hall, Osaka March 2 – Osaka-jō Hall, Osaka March 9 – Asty Tokushima, Tokushima March 18 – Port Messe Nagoya, Exhibition Hall 1, Aichi March 19 – Port Messe Nagoya, Exhibition Hall 1, Aichi April 1 – Big Hat, Nagano April 2 – Big Hat, Nagano April 8 – Sekisui Heim Super Arena, Miyagi April 9 – Sekisui Heim Super Arena, Miyagi April 20 – Hokkaido Prefectural Sports Center "Kitaeru", Hokkaido May 2 – Hiroshima Sun Plaza Hall, Hiroshima May 3 – Hiroshima Sun Plaza Hall, Hiroshima May 13 – Big Whale, Wakayama May 14 – Big Whale, Wakayama May 27 – Saitama Super Arena, Saitama May 28 – Saitama Super Arena, Saitama	An arena tour held after approximately 5 and a half years. Unlike the previous tour, audience members were able to cheer and sing along, thanks to the allowance of mask-wearing.
February 11, 2024 – April 25, 2024	BUMP OF CHICKEN TOUR Homeship Satellite 2024	8 Venues 16 Performances February 11 – K-Arena Yokohama, Kanagawa February 12 – K-Arena Yokohama, Kanagawa February 24 – Port Messe Nagoya, Exhibition Hall 1, Aichi February 25 – Port Messe Nagoya, Exhibition Hall 1, Aichi March 6 – Osaka-jō Hall, Osaka March 7 – Osaka-jō Hall, Osaka March 20 – Hiroshima Green Arena, Hiroshima March 21 – Hiroshima Green Arena, Hiroshima March 30 – Makomanai Sekisui Heim Ice Arena, Hokkaido March 31 – Makomanai Sekisui Heim Ice Arena, Hokkaido April 6 – Marine Messe Fukuoka A Hall, Fukuoka April 7 – Marine Messe Fukuoka A Hall, Fukuoka April 16 – Xebio Arena Sendai, Miyagi April 17 – Xebio Arena Sendai, Miyagi April 24 – Ariake Arena, Tokyo April 25 – Ariake Arena, Tokyo	A revival tour of the 2008 "Homeship Satellite" tour. The tour visuals featured the "Star Bird" from the cover of the 5th album orbital period, released in 2007, just like the previous tour.
September 7, 2024 – December 8, 2024	BUMP OF CHICKEN TOUR 2024 Sphery Rendezvous	10 Venues 9 Performances September 7 – Belluna Dome, Saitama September 8 – Belluna Dome, Saitama September 15 – Vantelin Dome Nagoya, Aichi September 16 – Vantelin Dome Nagoya, Aichi September 28 – Kyocera Dome Osaka, Osaka September 29 – Kyocera Dome Osaka, Osaka October 8 – Sendai Sun Plaza Hall, Miyagi October 9 – Sendai Sun Plaza Hall, Miyagi October 15 – Sapporo Cultural Arts Theatre hitaru, Hokkaido October 16 – Sapporo Cultural Arts Theatre hitaru, Hokkaido October 27 – Mizuho PayPay Dome Fukuoka, Fukuoka November 5 – Zepp Haneda (TOKYO), Tokyo November 6 – Zepp Haneda (TOKYO), Tokyo November 18 – Zepp Osaka Bayside, Osaka November 19 – Zepp Osaka Bayside, Osaka November 25 – Kanazawa Opera House, Ishikawa November 26 – Kanazawa Opera House, Ishikawa December 7 – Tokyo Dome, Tokyo December 8 – Tokyo Dome, Tokyo	A nationwide tour in conjunction with the release of the original album Iris. The tour included their first dome performance in approximately 5 years.
October 3, 2026 – December 20, 2026	BUMP OF CHICKEN TOUR 2026	8 Venues 16 Performances October 3 – Xebio Arena Sendai, Miyagi October 4 – Xebio Arena Sendai, Miyagi October 17 – Hokkaido Prefectural Sports Center "Kitaeru", Hokkaido October 18 – Hokkaido Prefectural Sports Center "Kitaeru", Hokkaido October 27 – Ariake Arena, Tokyo October 28 – Ariake Arena, Tokyo November 7 – GLION ARENA KOBE, Hyogo November 8 – GLION ARENA KOBE, Hyogo November 21 – Anabuki Arena Kagawa, Kagawa November 22 – Anabuki Arena Kagawa, Kagawa November 28 – Hiroshima Green Arena, Hiroshima November 29 – Hiroshima Green Arena, Hiroshima December 12 – Marine Messe Fukuoka, Hall A, Fukuoka December 13 – Marine Messe Fukuoka, Hall A, Fukuoka December 19 – IG Arena, Aichi December 20 – IG Arena, Aichi	An arena tour in conjunction with the band's 30th anniversary.

== Appearances ==
Appearances

- April 18, 2000 – LIVE SHOWER PHANTOM
- August 9, 2000 – MAJI ROCK FESTIVAL
- August 26, 2000 – au Sound Marina 2000
- August 29, 2000 – RUSH BALL 2000
- September 3, 2000 – SPACE SHOWER TV SWEET LOVE SHOWER 2000
- August 3, 2001 – ROCK IN JAPAN FESTIVAL 2001
- January 26, 2002 – FM NORTH WAVE Presents "NBQ"
- January 30, 2002 – FM AICHI Presents "COLLABORATION 807"
- February 1, 2002 – HFM 20th Anniversary DEAD STOCK BBQ
- February 4, 2002 – CROSS FM Presents "LIVE FUTURE FLAVA"
- August 10, 2002 – ROCK IN JAPAN FESTIVAL 2002
- September 1, 2002 – RUSH BALL 2002
- March 8, 2003 – SPACE SHOWER Music Video Awards 2003
- August 3, 2003 – ROCK IN JAPAN FESTIVAL 2003
- August 9, 2003 – SETSTOCK ’03
- August 16, 2003 – RISING SUN ROCK FESTIVAL 2003 in EZO
- August 30, 2003 – HIGHER GROUND 2003
- August 31, 2003 – RUSH BALL 2003
- August 7, 2004 – Busan International Rock Festival 2004
- August 14, 2004 – RISING SUN ROCK FESTIVAL 2004 in EZO
- August 18, 2004 – TREASURE 052 with ZIP-FM – Rainbow Surprise –
- August 28, 2004 – SETSTOCK ’04
- August 29, 2004 – RUSH BALL 2004
- July 24, 2005 – SETSTOCK ’05
- August 5, 2005 – ROCK IN JAPAN FESTIVAL 2005
- August 28, 2005 – RUSH BALL 2005
- September 3, 2005 – The Tug of Rock ’n’ Roll 05
- July 16, 2007 – HIGH LINE RECORDS 10th Anniversary – The 10th Summer –
- July 22, 2007 – SETSTOCK ’07
- July 28, 2007 – HIGHER GROUND 2007
- August 4, 2007 – ROCK IN JAPAN FESTIVAL 2007
- August 18, 2007 – RISING SUN ROCK FESTIVAL 2007 in EZO
- September 1, 2007 – SPACE SHOWER SWEET LOVE SHOWER 2007
- October 17, 2007 – FM802 "DESIGN THE NIGHT" Special Live – ICON-TACT –
- October 19, 2007 – SCHOOL OF LOCK! LIVE TOUR YOUNG FLAG 07
- March 15, 2008 – SPACE SHOWER Music Video Awards 2008
- August 1, 2008 – ROCK IN JAPAN FESTIVAL 2008
- June 23, 2012 – MTV VIDEO MUSIC AWARDS JAPAN 2012
- August 3, 2013 – ROCK IN JAPAN FESTIVAL 2013
- December 28, 2013 – FM802 ROCK FESTIVAL RADIO CRAZY 2013
- December 30, 2013 – COUNTDOWN JAPAN 13/14
- August 8, 2015 – ROCK IN JAPAN FESTIVAL 2015
- December 31, 2015 – COUNTDOWN JAPAN 15/16

They also appeared via live broadcast on NHK's Kōhaku Uta Gassen during this period.

- August 7, 2016 – ROCK IN JAPAN FESTIVAL 2016
- December 28, 2018 – COUNTDOWN JAPAN 18/19
- August 10, 2019 – ROCK IN JAPAN FESTIVAL 2019
- August 11, 2022 – ROCK IN JAPAN FESTIVAL 2022
- November 14, 2025 – WONDERLIVET 2025
- December 26, 2025 – FM802 ROCK FESTIVAL RADIO CRAZY 2025
- December 30, 2025 – COUNTDOWN JAPAN 25/26

== Media appearance ==
In the early years, the band rarely appeared on terrestrial television, instead focusing their promotional activities on radio, magazines, paid broadcasting services, and the internet. In more recent years, they have begun appearing more frequently on terrestrial TV. They occasionally appear on JAPAN COUNTDOWN (TV Tokyo), particularly ahead of new releases, and since the release of "R.I.P./Merry Christmas" in 2009, they have increasingly made video appearances on morning information programs such as Mezamashi TV (Fuji TV) and ZIP! (Nippon TV). At the time of their major debut single "Diamond," they also appeared on Music Tomato JAPAN (tvk).

In 2010, some media outlets reported that the band would appear on the NHK Kōhaku Uta Gassen, but they ultimately did not participate. In 2012, Kazumasa Oda revealed on the NHK year-end special Christmas no Yakusoku that he had invited the band to appear when he performed a cover of "Hana no Na," but the invitation was declined.

In July 2014, the band performed on terrestrial television for the first time on a special episode of Music Station (TV Asahi), performing "Niji wo Matsu Hito" and "RAY" live in front of an audience. They appeared as the final act of the three-hour special broadcast.

In 2015, the band made their first appearance on the NHK Kōhaku Uta Gassen during its 66th edition, performing "RAY" via live broadcast from the rock festival COUNTDOWN JAPAN 15/16. On December 5 of the same year and February 13 of the following year, they appeared twice on NHK's music program SONGS, each time featuring interviews and four studio live performances. Due to the strong response, a special extended program titled SONGS: BUMP OF CHICKEN Complete Edition aired on April 30, 2016, featuring eight studio performances and previously unreleased interview footage.

In October 2018, the band appeared on Music Station 2-Hour Special for the second time, four years after their previous appearance, performing "Hanashi ga Shitai yo," the theme song for the film Okuotoko. Actors Takeru Satoh and Issei Takahashi, who starred in the film, also appeared as supporting guests.

On February 27, 2021, the band appeared on SONGS for the first time in approximately five years. They performed four songs—"Mahō no Ryōri ~Kimi kara Kimi e~," "Aurora," "Acacia," and "Flare"—as a three-member lineup, excluding Naoi, who was on hiatus at the time. The broadcast also featured a location shoot in Shimokitazawa led by Fujiwara.

On December 31, 2021, the band returned to the 72nd NHK Kōhaku Uta Gassen, performing "Nanairo," the theme song of the NHK morning drama Okaeri Mone, and "Tentai Kansoku." This marked their second appearance on the program in six years and featured all four members, including Naoi.

Until February 2021, the band had never performed shortened versions of songs on television, instead performing full-length versions identical to their live concerts. However, at the 72nd NHK Kōhaku Uta Gassen, "Tentai Kansoku" was performed in a shortened version for the first time in the band's history, including live performances.

NHK has produced three documentary programs focusing on the band's tours and live performances. The 2004 documentary PEGASUS YOU was directed by Shuichi Banba, while the 2008 Homesick Satellite documentary featured narration by Masami Nagasawa. In 2014, footage from the band's first Tokyo Dome concert and behind-the-scenes material was broadcast as BUMP OF CHICKEN: Creation with Creators, narrated by actor Tori Matsuzaka, who has publicly stated he is a fan of the band.

On the radio, the band hosts a regular program titled PONTSUKA!! on bayfm, which airs weekly. A near-identical version of the program, with music segments removed, is also available via online streaming.

=== Space Shower ===
BUMP OF CHICKEN has frequently appeared on Space Shower TV. The following information is based on descriptions from the band's official website.

- November 1999: During their independent era, the single "LAMP" was selected as a POWER PUSH, Space Shower TV's heavy rotation program.
- September 2000: The band appeared at SWEET LOVE SHOWER, a live music event organized by Space Shower TV.
- March 2001: Following their major-label debut, the single "Tentai Kansoku" was again selected as a POWER PUSH.
- April 2001: Their first regular television program, BUMP TV-Men's Experience-, began airing on Space Shower TV.
- May 29, 2004: To commemorate the fifth anniversary of their debut, the band held a concert at Sakura Civic Gymnasium, which was broadcast live on Space Shower TV. On the same day, the network designated the date as "BUMP DAY", rebroadcasting past live performances and special programs related to the band throughout the day. Footage from these broadcasts was later partially used in the promotional video produced when "Arue" was released as a single.
- April 2006: Fujiwara appeared as the first guest on SPACE SHOWER HOT 50 Chart ★ Cobain, credited under the name Motoo Fujiwara.

In addition to these appearances, the band has also participated in limited-time exclusive broadcasts of new music videos and made guest appearances on various Space Shower TV programs.

== Fanbase ==
According to Oricon's ongoing survey Favorite Artist Rankings, BUMP OF CHICKEN ranked second among teenagers in the 2006 survey (first among teenage males and fifth among teenage females). In the 2012 survey, the band ranked sixth among teenagers and tenth among people in their twenties. In the 2014 survey, they ranked eighth overall, eighth among teenagers, fourth among people in their twenties, and seventh among people in their thirties.

A number of fellow musicians have publicly stated that they are devoted fans of the band, including Yojiro Noda of RADWIMPS, Kazutoshi Sakurai of Mr.Children, Masamune Kusano of Spitz, Kentaro Kobuchi, and John-Ken Johnny of MAN WITH A MISSION.

In particular, Sakurai has stated that he frequently listens to and sings BUMP OF CHICKEN's songs in private, praising their music as being "art on the level of Osamu Dazai". In a magazine interview reflecting on the 2000s, he also cited "Lost Man" as the most memorable song of that decade.

In addition, Fukase of SEKAI NO OWARI, Kenshi Yonezu, and Yuuri have also identified themselves as enthusiastic fans and have named the band as a major influence on their own music.

Outside the music industry, notable fans include astronaut Soichi Noguchi, figure skater Yuzuru Hanyu, voice actress Wasabi Mizuta (the voice of Doraemon), actress Miki Sakai, and comedian Nobu, all of whom are known listeners of BUMP OF CHICKEN.

== Charity activities ==
In response to the Great East Japan Earthquake caused by the Tōhoku earthquake and tsunami in March 2011, the band produced its first charity song, "Smile." The single was released nationwide on May 11, approximately two months after the disaster, with all proceeds from CD sales and digital distribution donated to the Japanese Red Cross Society. Donation amounts were disclosed on a dedicated website at monthly intervals, with the total contribution reaching 69,627,833 yen.

In addition, during the nationwide GOOD GLIDER TOUR held from late 2011, the band sold "Great East Japan Earthquake charity wristbands." Sales proceeds totaled 10,010,500 yen, all of which were donated to the Japanese Red Cross Society as disaster relief funds.

Following the Kumamoto earthquakes in April 2016, the band began selling reconstruction-support wristbands starting with the Nagoya Dome performance of the BFLY tour on May 8. Proceeds from sales at the Nagoya, Fukuoka, and Yokohama shows, as well as from mail-order sales, exceeded 35 million yen, which the band reported on its official website was donated and remitted to the Japanese Red Cross Society on September 30 of the same year.

Furthermore, during the final Tokyo Dome performances of the aurora ark tour in 2019, charity wristbands were sold at the venue and through the official online store. All proceeds from these sales were designated for donation via the Japanese Red Cross Society to disaster relief funds for Typhoon Faxai in Chiba Prefecture, Typhoon Faxai disaster relief in Tokyo, and Typhoon Hagibis.

== Discography ==
Bump of Chicken discography
- Studio albums: 10
- Compilation albums: 3
- Singles: 29

=== Studio albums ===
List of studio albums, showing selected details, chart positions, sales, and certifications
Title	Details	Peak chart positions		Sales		Certifications
Title	Details	JPN	JPN Hot	First week	Total sales	Certifications
Flame Vein	Released: March 18, 1999; Label: High Line Records; Format: CD	77	—	3,280	34,331	
The Living Dead	Released: March 25, 2000 (indie); Label: High Line Records; Format: CD	51	—	4,200	87,696	
Jupiter	Released: February 20, 2002; Label: Toy's Factory; Format: CD, digital download, streaming	1	55	250,210	680,763	
Flame Vein +1	Released: April 28, 2004; Label: Toy's Factory; Formats: CD, digital download, streaming	16	—	16,670	174,693	
The Living Dead	Released: April 28, 2004 (major); Label: Toy's Factory; Formats: CD, digital download, streaming	19	—	13,583	165,932	
Yggdrasil	Released: August 25, 2004; Label: Toy's Factory; Format: CD, digital download, streaming	1	—	315,065	683,211	
Orbital Period	Released: December 19, 2007; Label: Toy's Factory; Formats: CD, digital download, streaming	2	78	381,446	680,270	RIAJ: 2× Platinum (phy.)
Cosmonaut	Released: December 15, 2010; Label: Toy's Factory; Formats: CD, digital download, streaming	1	—	207,160	342,041	RIAJ: Platinum (phy.)
Ray	Released: March 12, 2014; Label: Toy's Factory; Formats: CD, CD+DVD, digital download, streaming	1	53	182,003	278,000	RIAJ: Platinum (phy.)
Butterflies	Released: February 10, 2016; Label: Toy's Factory; Formats: CD, CD+DVD, CD+Blu-ray, digital download, streaming	1	1	197,160	286,000	RIAJ: Platinum (phy.)
Aurora Arc	Released: July 10, 2019; Label: Toy's Factory; Formats: CD, CD+DVD, CD+Blu-ray, digital download, streaming	1	1	202,157	251,528	RIAJ: Platinum (phy.)
Iris	Released: September 4, 2024; Label: Toy's Factory; Formats: CD, CD+Blu-ray, digital download, streaming	1	1	113,084	132,275	RIAJ: Gold (phy.)
"—" denotes releases that did not chart

=== Compilation albums ===
List of compilation albums, showing selected details, chart positions, sales, and certifications
Album	Details	Peak chart positions		Sales		Certifications
Album	Details	JPN	JPN Hot	First week	Total Sales	Certifications
Present from You	Released: June 18, 2008; Label: Toy's Factory; Formats: CD, digital download, streaming	2	—	148,473	235,000	RIAJ: Platinum (phy.)
Bump of Chicken I [1999–2004]	Released: July 3, 2013; Label: Toy's Factory; Formats: CD, digital download, streaming	1	56	172,712	252,000	RIAJ: Platinum (phy.)
Bump of Chicken II [2005–2010]	Released: July 3, 2013; Label: Toy's Factory; Formats: CD, digital download, streaming	2	—	168,262	239,000	RIAJ: Platinum (phy.)
"—" denotes releases that did not chart

=== Other albums ===
Year	Details	Oricon charts
Year	Details	Weekly
2006	Song for Tales of the Abyss: 1st Motoo Fujiwara solo soundtrack album; Released: March 22, 2006	6

=== Singles ===
List of singles as lead artist, showing year released, selected chart positions, sales, certifications, and album name
Title	Year	Peak chart positions			Sales		Certifications	Album
Title	Year	JPN	JPN Hot	WW	First week	Total	Certifications	Album
"Lamp"	1999	181	—	—	526			The Living Dead
"Diamond" (ダイヤモンド)	2000	15	—	—	26,320	92,797		Jupiter
"Tentai Kansoku" (天体観測)	2001	3	15	—	44,570	581,254	RIAJ: Gold (phy.); 2× Platinum (st.)	Jupiter
"Harujion" (ハルジオン)	2001	5	—	—	95,090	182,010	RIAJ: Gold (phy.)	Jupiter
"Snow Smile" (スノースマイル)	2002	3	65	—	85,569	153,966	RIAJ: Gold (phy.)	Yggdrasil
"Lost Man" (ロストマン)	2003	2	94	—	132,098	249,909	RIAJ: Platinum (phy.)	Yggdrasil
"Sailing Day"	2003	2	—	—	132,098	249,909	RIAJ: Platinum (phy.)	Yggdrasil
"Arue" (アルエ)	2004	2	—	—	55,966	177,855	RIAJ: Gold (phy.)	Flame Vein
"Only Lonely Glory" (オンリー ロンリー グローリー)	2004	1	—	—	114,717	174,661	RIAJ: Platinum (phy.)	Yggdrasil
"Sharin no Uta" (車輪の唄)	2004	3	—	—	75,881	123,609	RIAJ: Gold (phy.)	Yggdrasil
"Planetarium" (プラネタリウム)	2005	4	—	—	134,667	261,193	RIAJ: Platinum (phy.)	Orbital Period
"Supernova"	2005	2	—	—	161,022	493,230	RIAJ: Platinum (phy.)	Orbital Period
"Karma" (カルマ)	2005	2	—	—	161,022	493,230	RIAJ: Platinum (phy.); Gold (st.)	Orbital Period
"Namida no Furusato" (涙のふるさと)	2006	1	—	—	180,226	263,025	RIAJ: Platinum (phy.)	Orbital Period
"Hana no Na" (花の名)	2007	1	—	—	176,744	260,756	RIAJ: Platinum (phy.)	Orbital Period
"Mayday" (メーデー)	2007	2	—	—	171,095	223,566	RIAJ: Platinum (phy.)	Orbital Period
"R.I.P."	2009	2	2	—	146,642	202,963	RIAJ: Gold (phy.)	Cosmonaut
"Merry Christmas"	2009	2	10	—	146,642	202,963	RIAJ: Gold (phy.)	Cosmonaut
"Happy"	2010	1	1	—	96,527	157,324	RIAJ: Gold (phy.)	Cosmonaut
"Mahō no Ryōri ~Kimi Kara Kimi e~" (魔法の料理 〜君から君へ〜)	2010	1	1	—	104,492	152,501	RIAJ: Gold (phy.)	Cosmonaut
"Uchūhikōshi e no Tegami" (宇宙飛行士への手紙)	2010	1	1	—	92,910	128,923	RIAJ: Gold (phy.)	Cosmonaut
"Motorcycle" (モーターサイクル)	2010	1	51	—	92,910	128,923	RIAJ: Gold (phy.)	Cosmonaut
"Tomodachi no Uta" (友達の唄)	2011	2	2	—	82,043	121,102	RIAJ: Gold (phy.)	Ray
"Smile"	2011	3	2	—	86,078	132,959	RIAJ: Gold (phy.)	Ray
"Zero" (ゼロ)	2011	2	1	—	163,381	257,006	RIAJ: Platinum (phy.)	Ray
"Good Luck" (グッドラック)	2012	1	1	—	148,753	195,714	RIAJ: Gold (phy.)	Ray
"Firefly"	2012	2	2	—	78,936	108,296	RIAJ: Gold (phy.)	Ray
"Niji o Matsu Hito" (虹を待つ人)	2013	—	5	—				Ray
"Ray" (solo or featuring Hatsune Miku)	2014	—	2	—			RIAJ: Platinum (st.)	Ray
"You Were Here"	2014	—	6	—				Butterflies
"Fighter" (ファイター)	2014	—	4	—				Butterflies
"Parade" (パレード)	2014	—	8	—				Butterflies
"Hello, World!"	2015	2	1	—	150,417	218,521	RIAJ: Gold (phy.)	Butterflies
"Colony" (コロニー)	2015	2	18	—			RIAJ: Gold (phy.)	Butterflies
"Aria" (アリア)	2016	—	9	—				Aurora Arc
"Answer" (アンサー)	2016	—	7	—			RIAJ: Gold (dig.)	Aurora Arc
"Ribbon" (リボン)	2017	—	2	—			RIAJ: Platinum (dig.)	Aurora Arc
"Kinen Satsuei" (記念撮影)	2017	29	3	—			RIAJ: Gold (dig.)	Aurora Arc
"Bōen no March" (望遠のマーチ)	2018	—	5	—			RIAJ: Gold (dig.)	Aurora Arc
"Hanashi ga Shitai yo" (話がしたいよ)	2018	3	2	—			RIAJ: Gold (phy.)	Aurora Arc
"Sirius" (シリウス)	2018	3	3	—			RIAJ: Gold (phy.)	Aurora Arc
"Spica"	2018	3	23	—			RIAJ: Gold (phy.)	Aurora Arc
"Aurora"	2019	—	5	—			RIAJ: Gold (st.)	Aurora Arc
"Gravity"	2020	2	13	—			RIAJ: Gold (phy.)	Iris
"Acacia" (アカシア)	2020	2	3	139			RIAJ: Gold (phy.); Platinum (st.)	Iris
"Flare"	2021	—	23	—				Iris
"Nanairo" (なないろ)	2021	1	3	— (Note: "Nanairo" did not enter the Billboard Global 200, but peaked at number 115 on the Global Excl. US.)	105,366		RIAJ: Gold (phy.); Gold (st.)	Iris
"Small World"	2021	—	9	—				Iris
"Chronostasis" (クロノスタシス)	2022	—	3	— (Note: "Chronostasis" did not enter the Billboard Global 200, but peaked at number 142 on the Global Excl. US.)			RIAJ: Platinum (st.)	Iris
"Souvenir"	2022	2	2	— (Note: "Souvenir" did not enter the Billboard Global 200, but peaked at number 81 on the Global Excl. US.)	59,667		RIAJ: Platinum (st.)	Iris
"Sleep Walking Orchestra"	2023	—	8	—				Iris
"Madononakakara" (窓の中から)	2023	—	29	—				Iris
"Kaikō" (邂逅)	2024	—	11	—				Iris
"Strawberry"	2024	—	27	—				Iris
"I"	2025	3	7	—	63,277			Non-album single
"—" denotes releases that did not chart or were not released in that region.

=== Promotional singles ===
List of promotional singles, showing year released, select chart positions, and album name
Title	Year	Peak chart positions	Album
Title	Year	JPN Hot	Album
"Butterfly"	2016	10	Butterflies

=== Other charted and certified songs ===
List of songs not released as singles, showing year released, select chart positions, and album name
Title	Year	Peak chart positions	Album
Title	Year	JPN Hot	Album
"Present" (プレゼント)	2008	60	Present from You
"Bunbetsufuntōki" (分別奮闘記)	2010	96	Cosmonaut
"Southern Cross" (サザンクロス)	2014	63	Ray
"Go"	2016	30	Butterflies
"Shinsekai" (新世界)	2019	36	Aurora Arc
"Nagareboshinoshoutai" (流れ星の正体)	2019	99	Aurora Arc

=== Videos ===
Year	Title	Format	Catalog
2000	Video Pokiiru (ビデオポキール): Released: February 25, 2000, re-released on April 28, 2004	VHS	HLR-010
2000	Video Pokiiru (ビデオポキール): Released: February 25, 2000, re-released on April 28, 2004	DVD	HLR-025
2000	Video Pokiiru (ビデオポキール): Released: February 25, 2000, re-released on April 28, 2004	DVD	TFBQ-18046
2002	jupiter: Released: December 18, 2002	VHS	TFVQ-68066
2002	jupiter: Released: December 18, 2002	DVD	TFBQ-18029
2004	Yggdrasil: Released: December 1, 2004	DVD	TFBQ-18087
2006	Puppet Show Guild (人形劇ギルド Ningyougeki Guild): Released: September 20, 2006	DVD	TFBQ-18066
2008	orbital period: Released: May 14, 2008	DVD	TFBQ-18087
2011	COSMONAUT: Released: October 19, 2011	DVD	TFBQ-18118
2011	COSMONAUT: Released: October 19, 2011	Blu-RAY Disc	TFXQ-78101
2013	BUMP OF CHICKEN GOLD GLIDER TOUR 2012: Released: March 6, 2013	DVD+CD	TFBQ-18135 (Limited Edition)
2013	BUMP OF CHICKEN GOLD GLIDER TOUR 2012: Released: March 6, 2013	DVD	TFBQ-18136 (Regular Edition)
2013	BUMP OF CHICKEN GOLD GLIDER TOUR 2012: Released: March 6, 2013	Blu-RAY Disc+CD	TFXQ-78108 (Limited Edition)
2013	BUMP OF CHICKEN GOLD GLIDER TOUR 2012: Released: March 6, 2013	Blu-RAY Disc	TFXQ-78109 (Regular Edition)
2015	BUMP OF CHICKEN WILLPOLIS 2014: Released: February 4, 2015	DVD+CD	TFBQ-18163 (Limited Edition)
2015	BUMP OF CHICKEN WILLPOLIS 2014: Released: February 4, 2015	DVD	TFBQ-18164 (Regular Edition)
2015	BUMP OF CHICKEN WILLPOLIS 2014: Released: February 4, 2015	Blu-RAY Disc+CD	TFXQ-78117 (Limited Edition)
2015	BUMP OF CHICKEN WILLPOLIS 2014: Released: February 4, 2015	Blu-RAY Disc	TFXQ-78118 (Regular Edition)
2016	BUMP OF CHICKEN 20th Anniversary Special Live "20": Released: July 13, 2016	DVD+CD	TFBQ-18188 (Limited Edition)
2016	BUMP OF CHICKEN 20th Anniversary Special Live "20": Released: July 13, 2016	DVD	TFBQ-18189 (Regular Edition)
2016	BUMP OF CHICKEN 20th Anniversary Special Live "20": Released: July 13, 2016	Blu-RAY Disc+CD	TFXQ-78144 (Limited Edition)
2016	BUMP OF CHICKEN 20th Anniversary Special Live "20": Released: July 13, 2016	Blu-RAY Disc	TFXQ-78145 (Regular Edition)
2016	BUMP OF CHICKEN Stadium Tour 2016 "BFLY" Nissan Stadium 2016/7/16,17: Released: December 21, 2016	DVD+CD	TFBQ-18190 (Limited Edition)
2016	BUMP OF CHICKEN Stadium Tour 2016 "BFLY" Nissan Stadium 2016/7/16,17: Released: December 21, 2016	DVD	TFBQ-18191 (Regular Edition)
2016	BUMP OF CHICKEN Stadium Tour 2016 "BFLY" Nissan Stadium 2016/7/16,17: Released: December 21, 2016	Blu-RAY Disc+CD	TFXQ-78147 (Limited Edition)
2016	BUMP OF CHICKEN Stadium Tour 2016 "BFLY" Nissan Stadium 2016/7/16,17: Released: December 21, 2016	Blu-RAY Disc	TFXQ-78148 (Regular Edition)
2018	BUMP OF CHICKEN PATHFINDER Live at Studio Coast: Released: February 10, 2018	DVD	PPTF-1027
2018	BUMP OF CHICKEN PATHFINDER Live at Studio Coast: Released: February 10, 2018	Blu-RAY	PPTF-7017
2018	BUMP OF CHICKEN TOUR 2017–2018 PATHFINDER Saitama Super Arena: Released: August 8, 2018	DVD+CD	TFBQ-18207 (Limited Edition)
2018	BUMP OF CHICKEN TOUR 2017–2018 PATHFINDER Saitama Super Arena: Released: August 8, 2018	DVD	TFXQ-78166 (Regular Edition)
2018	BUMP OF CHICKEN TOUR 2017–2018 PATHFINDER Saitama Super Arena: Released: August 8, 2018	Blu-RAY Disc+CD	TFXQ-78165 (Limited Edition)
2018	BUMP OF CHICKEN TOUR 2017–2018 PATHFINDER Saitama Super Arena: Released: August 8, 2018	Blu-RAY Disc	TFXQ-78166 (Regular Edition)
2020	BUMP OF CHICKEN TOUR 2019 aurora ark Tokyo Dome: Released: November 4, 2020	DVD+CD	TFBQ-18232 (First Press Limited Edition)
2020	BUMP OF CHICKEN TOUR 2019 aurora ark Tokyo Dome: Released: November 4, 2020	DVD+CD	TFBQ-18233 (regular edition)
2020	BUMP OF CHICKEN TOUR 2019 aurora ark Tokyo Dome: Released: November 4, 2020	Blu-RAYs + CDs	TFXQ-78188 (First Press Limited Edition)
2020	BUMP OF CHICKEN TOUR 2019 aurora ark Tokyo Dome: Released: November 4, 2020	Blu-RAYs + CDs	TFXQ-78189 (regular edition)
2023	BUMP OF CHICKEN LIVE 2022 Silver Jubilee at Makuhari Messe: Released: April 5, 2023	Blu-RAYs + CDs	TFXQ-78232 (First Press Limited Edition)
2023	BUMP OF CHICKEN TOUR 2022 Silver Jubilee at Zepp Haneda (Tokyo): Released: May 24, 2023	Blu-RAYs + CDs	TFXQ-78238 (First Press Limited Edition)
2023	BUMP OF CHICKEN TOUR2023 be there at Saitama Super Arena: Released: December 20, 2023	Blu-RAYs + CDs	PPTF-7087 (TOY'S STORE exclusive first edition)
2023	BUMP OF CHICKEN TOUR2023 be there at Saitama Super Arena: Released: December 20, 2023	Blu-RAYs + CDs	TFXQ-78265 (regular edition)
2025	BUMP OF CHICKEN TOUR Homeship Satellite 2024 at Ariake Arena: Released: February 10, 2025	Blu-RAYs + CDs	PPTF-7121 (TOY'S STORE limited edition)
2025	BUMP OF CHICKEN TOUR 2024 Sphery Rendezvous at Tokyo Dome: Released: December 10, 2025	Blu-RAYs + CDs	PPTF-7155 (Toy's Store limited edition)
2025	BUMP OF CHICKEN TOUR 2024 Sphery Rendezvous at Tokyo Dome: Released: December 10, 2025	Blu-RAYs + CDs	TFXQ-78302 (regular edition)

== Participating works ==
Release date	Title	Format	Catalog Number	Tracklist
September 16, 2004	Synchronized Rockers	CD	KICS-1103	Hybrid Rainbow
July 15, 2015	TV anime "Blood Blockade Battlefront " Original Soundtrack	2CD	THCA-60055	Hello,World! (TV size version)

=== Self-produced ===
- Demo Tape (Date Unknown)
  - BUMP OF CHICKEN (Theme)/Danny/Glass Blues and others No Reason (BOC-001) (October 1997) A demo tape sold at Chiba ANGA. Later sold by Shimokitazawa Highline Records.
  - Glass Blues/Alue/Knife no title (demo tape) (September 23, 1998) Tracks: BUMP OF CHICKEN Theme/18 Years Story/Little Braver/Alue/Knife/Kudaranai Uta/Glass Blues
  - BUMP OF CHICKEN (BOC-002) (October 24, 1998) A limited-edition CD with 500 copies, serial numbers included. Tracks: Alue/Little Braver/Knife Note: There were multiple tapes prior to these, mostly covers and other tracks.

== Tie-up ==
Year of use:	Song Title	Tie-up
2002	Tentai Kansoku	Insert song for the Kansai TV and Fuji TV drama Tentai Kansoku.
2003	sailing day	Theme song for the movie One Piece the Movie: Dead End Adventure.
2005	Karma	Theme song for the PlayStation 2 game Tales of the Abyss.
2006	Namida no Furusato	CM song for Lotte's Airs.
2007	Hana no Na	Theme song for the movie Always: Sunset on Third Street 2.
2008	Karma	Opening theme for the TV anime Tales of the Abyss.
2010	pinkie	Theme song for the Fuji TV website 1924.jp.
2010	pinkie	Theme song for the Fuji TV talk documentary program 1924
2010	Mahou no Ryouri ~Kimi kara Kimi e~	Song used for NHK's Minna no Uta during April–May 2010
2011	Tomodachi no Uta	Theme song for the movie Doraemon: Nobita and the Steel Troops - The Angels' Wings
2011	Smile	CM song for the SoftBank Mobile-provided Reconstruction Support Portal Site
2011	Zero	Theme song for the PlayStation Portable game Final Fantasy Type-0
2012	Good Luck	Theme song for the movie ALWAYS: Sunset on Third Street '64
2012	firefly	Theme song for the Fuji TV drama Iki mo Dekinai Natsu
2013	Niji o Matsu Hito	Theme song for the movie Gatchaman
2013	Tentai Kansoku	CM song for NTT Docomo's dHits Summer Memories Edition
2014	Fighter	Collaboration song for the manga March Comes in Like a Lion
2014	Parade	Theme song for the movie Parasyte
2015	Fighter	Ending theme for Nara TV's High School Baseball Highlight Dramatic Nine 2015 edition
2015	Hello,world!	Opening theme for the TV anime Kekkai Sensen
2015	Colony	Theme song for the movie Parasyte: Part 2
2016	Butterfly	Google Play Music Commercial Song
2016	Houseki ni Natta Hi	CM song for Calpis Calpis Water
2016	Aria	Theme song for the TBS drama Aogeba Totoshi
2016	Answer	Opening theme for the NHK General TV anime March Comes in Like a Lion
2016	Fighter	Ending theme for the NHK General TV anime March Comes in Like a Lion
2016	Go	CM song for the social game Granblue Fantasy "Go into the Blue" edition
2017	Go	Opening theme for the TV anime Granblue Fantasy The Animation
2017	Kinen Shashin	CM song for Nissin Cup Noodles Hungry Days Aoharu Kayo
2017	Ribbon	CM song for Samsung Electronics smartphone Galaxy S8
2018	Sirius	Opening theme for the TV anime Juushinki Pandora
2018	Spica	Ending theme for the TV anime Juushinki Pandora
2018	Bouen no March	CM song for the GungHo smartphone game Yo-kai Watch World
2018	Hanashi ga Shitaiyo	Theme song for the movie Ookuman
2018	Gekkou	Opening theme for the TV anime Karakuri Circus
2018	Shin Sekai	Theme song for Lotte's 70th-anniversary special animation Baby I Love You daze
2019	Lost Man/sailing day	CM song for Sapporo Beer 95th Hakone Ekiden - Hakone Ekiden, Beyond Lost Man
2019	Aurora	Theme song for the TBS drama The Good Wife
2019	Gekkou	Ending theme for the TV anime Karakuri Circus
2019	Kinen Shashin	CM song for Nissin Cup Noodles Hungry Days One Piece
2020	Nagareboshi no Shoutai	Theme song for Jalan 30th-anniversary special film Koko de wa Nai Dokoka de
2020	Tentai Kansoku	Ending theme (self-chosen) for the TV Tokyo show Ariyoshiii eeeeee! Sou da! Ima kara Omae nchi de Game shinai? (Episodes 77–78)
2020	Gravity	Theme song for the anime movie Love Me, Love Me Not
2020	Ribbon	Insert song for the anime movie Love Me, Love Me Not
2020	Acacia	Theme song for the Pokémon special music video GOTCHA!
2021	Nana-iro	Theme song for the NHK Morning Drama Okaeri Mone
2021	Small world	Theme song for the movie Sumikko Gurashi: The Magical Blue Moonlit Night
2022	Stage of the Ground	CM song for Sapporo Beer 98th Hakone Ekiden - 4th-Year Power Edition
2022	Chronostasis	Theme song for the anime movie Detective Conan: The Bride of Halloween
2022	Tentai Kansoku (2022 Rerecording Version)	CM song for Apple Music Rediscovering "Tentai Kansoku" with Dolby Atmos Spatial Audio
2022	SOUVENIR	Opening theme for the second cour of the TV Tokyo anime SPY×FAMILY
2022	Tentai Kansoku (2022 Rerecording Version)	CM song for Subaru Crosstrek
2023	Tentai Kansoku (2022 Rerecording Version)	Theme song for Toho animation's 10th-anniversary project TOHO animation Music Films - First film Tentai Kansoku
2023	Mado no Naka kara	Theme song for NHK's 18 Sai
2024	Sleep Walking Orchestra	Opening theme for the TV anime Dungeon Meshi
2024	Diamond	CM song for Sapporo Beer 100th Hakone Ekiden
2024	Kaikou	Theme song for the movie Onmyoji 0
2024	Strawberry	Theme song for the TBS drama Saionji-san wa Kaji o Shinai
2024	Mayday	Song used for Transformers 40th Anniversary Special Movie
2025	Ribbon	Ending song for the Japanese version of the movie Elio
2025	Kaikou	Song used in the promotional video for March Comes in Like a Lion Volume 18
2025	Ginga Tetsudou	In-film song for the movie 5 Centimeters Per Second
2025	I	Ending theme for the Yomiuri TV and Nippon TV anime My Hero Academia Final Season
2026	ray (Cosmic Princess Kaguya! Version)	Cover version performed by Yūko Natsuyoshi and Saori Hayami served as the ending theme for the Netflix movie Cosmic Princess Kaguya!

== Music video ==
From the album jupiter to COSMONAUT, a music video collection (PV collection) was released with each album (however, no MV collection was released for the compilation album present from you). For the music videos of songs from RAY onward, they are often included on the limited-edition DVD (or Blu-RAY) that comes with the album. Nearly all music videos released after their major debut have been made available on YouTube.

As mentioned earlier, nearly all music videos from the time of their major debut up until "Hello, world!" in 2015 were directed by filmmaker Shuichi Banba. In recent years, directors Atsunori Higashi and Kyotaro Hayashi have often been in charge of the music videos.

Note: The release year is based on the YouTube publication date.

Release Year	Director	Song Title	Notes
2009	Shuichi Banba	R.I.P.	
2009	Shuichi Banba	Merry Christmas	
2010	Shuichi Banba	Mahō no Ryōri ~Kimi kara Kimi e~ (Magical Cooking ~From You to You~)	
2010	Shuichi Banba	Karma	
2010	Shuichi Banba	Sharin no Uta (Song of the Wheel)	
2010	Shuichi Banba	HAPPY	
2010	Shuichi Banba	Uchū Hikōshi e no Tegami (A Letter to an Astronaut)	
2010	Shuichi Banba	Motorcycle	
2010	Shuichi Banba	Tentai Kansoku (Astronomical Observation)	
2010	Shuichi Banba	sailing day	
2011	Shuichi Banba	Tomodachi no Uta (Song of Friends)	
2013	Shuichi Banba	Tentai Kansoku (Astronomical Observation)	Special MV
2013	Shuichi Banba	Niji o Matsu Hito (The One Who Waits for the Rainbow)	
2014	Atsunori Higashi	RAY	
2014	Atsunori Higashi	RAY（feat.HATSUNE MIKU）	
2014	Shuichi Banba	You were here	
2014	Takashi Yamazaki Ryuichi Yagi Makoto Hanafusa	Parade	
2014	Shuichi Banba	Fighter	
2014	Chica Umino	Fighter	(March Comes in Like a Lion meets BUMP OF CHICKEN)
2015	Takashi Yamazaki Ryuichi Yagi	Colony	
2015	Shuichi Banba Atsunori Higashi	Hello, world!	
2016	Atsunori Higashi	Butterfly	
2016	Atsunori Higashi	Houseki ni Natta Hi (The Day It Became a Jewel)	
2016	Atsunori Higashi	Aria	
2016	Atsunori Higashi	GO	
2017	Unknown	Answer	Supervised by the anime production studio SHAFT.
2017	Atsunori Higashi	Ribbon	
2017	Atsunori Higashi	Kinen Shashin (Commemorative Photo)	Lyric video
2017	Atsunori Higashi	Kinen Shashin (Commemorative Photo)	
2018	Shishiyamazaki	Bouen no March (March of Distant Views)	
2018	Atsunori Higashi	Sirius	
2018	Atsunori Higashi	Hanashi ga Shitaiyo (I Want to Talk)	
2018	Atsunori Higashi	Spica	Lyric video
2019	Kyotaro Hayashi	Aurora	Starring: Miku Uehara
2019		Nagareboshi no Shoutai (Acoustic)	A lyric video that displays only handwritten lyrics by Fujiwara.
2019	Kyotaro Hayashi	Nagareboshi no Shoutai	
2020	Shuichi Banba	firefly	
2020	Shuichi Banba	Smile	Band ver.
2020	Shuichi Banba	supernova	
2020	Shuichi Banba	Stage of the ground	
2020	Shuichi Banba	Alue	
2020	Shuichi Banba	Guild	
2020	Shuichi Banba	Snow Smile	
2020	Shuichi Banba	Zero	
2020	Shuichi Banba	Diamond	
2020	Shuichi Banba	Bye Bye Thank You	
2020	Shuichi Banba	Hana no Na (Flower's Name)	
2020	Shuichi Banba	Harujion	
2020	Shuichi Banba	Planetarium	
2020	Shuichi Banba	Did You See the Crimson Sky?	
2020	Shuichi Banba	Mayday	
2020	Shuichi Banba	Melody Flag	
2020	Shuichi Banba	Mitsuboshi Quartet (Three-Star Quartet)	
2020	Shuichi Banba	Beautiful Glider	
2020	Shuichi Banba Yasuhiko Shimizu	Only Lonely Glory	
2020	Shuichi Banba Hitoshi Takanohara	Lost Man	
2020	Takashi Yamazaki	Good Luck	
2020	Takashi Yamazaki	Namida no Furusato (Tears’ Hometown)	Starring: Maki Horikita and Ryu Morioka
2020	Kyotaro Hayashi	Gravity	
2020	Rie Matsumoto	Acacia	Pokémon Special Music Video "GOTCHA!"
2020	Nobutaka Yoda	New World	
2021	Yoshiharu Ota	Flare	
2021	Kyotaro Hayashi	Nana-iro	
2021	Hiroto Kojima	Small world	
2021	Daisuke Shimada	Nana-iro	Performance MV
2022	Kyotaro Hayashi	Chronostasis	
2022	Spikey John	SOUVENIR	
2023	Kyotaro Hayashi	Mado no Naka kara (From Inside the Window)	There is an MV-original scene in which Fujiwara sings a cappella.
2024	Yuichiro Saeki	Sleep Walking Orchestra	
2024	Kyotaro Hayashi	Kaikou (Encounter)	
2024	Kyotaro Hayashi	Strawberry	
2024	Yuichiro Saeki	Amedama no Uta (Candy Song)	
2025	Hidenobu Tanabe	I	

=== Unreleased music videos ===
Note: Music videos that have not been published on YouTube (including those that were previously released).

Director	Song title	Notes
Takehiko Inoue	Smile	Included on Smile
Tatsuya Ota	Lamp	Included on Video Pokiil
Ittetsu Kitaoka	Glorious Revolution	Included on Video Pokiil
Tomoyuki Kuroda	Glass Blues	Included on Video Pokiil
Tomoyuki Kuroda	Little Braver	Included on Video Pokiil
Unknown	Snow Smile (ringing ver.)	
Unknown	Believe	Hidden footage from the video work orbital period
Unknown	Of Course	Hidden footage from the video work COSMONAUT
Unknown	Gekkou	Included on the first limited edition of aurora arc
Unknown	Aruku Yuurei (Walking Ghost)	Filmed, but never released anywhere
Unknown	Answer	TV size ver. Supervised by the anime production studio SHAFT
Unknown	Kinen Shashin (Commemorative Photo)	「Hungry Days × BUMP OF CHICKEN」
Unknown	BUMP OF CHICKEN no Theme	Hidden footage from BUMP OF CHICKEN 20th Anniversary Special Live "20"
Unknown	Omar	Hidden footage from BUMP OF CHICKEN TOUR 2017–2018 PATHFINDER Saitama Super Arena Hidden footage on the first limited-edition DVD of Hello, world! / Colony
Unknown	TO.I.KI	Hidden footage from BUMP OF CHICKEN Stadium Tour 2016 "BFLY" Nissan Stadium 2016/7/16,17
Unknown	Yama yo (O Mountain)	Hidden footage on the first limited-edition DVD of Hanashi ga Shitaiyo / Sirius / Spica. Uses the arrangement included on the first limited-edition CD
Unknown	Payapapa Ace	Hidden footage on the first limited-edition DVD of aurora arc
Unknown	Koutetsu no Barong (Steel Barong)	『Hidden footage from BUMP OF CHICKEN TOUR 2019 aurora ark Tokyo Dome Hidden footage from BUMP OF CHICKEN TOUR 2022 Silver Jubilee at Zepp Haneda (TOKYO). Hidden footage on the Acacia / Gravity "Acacia edition" DVD
Unknown	Yasashigon	Hidden footage on the first limited-edition DVD/Blu-RAY of Nana-iro
Unknown	Daichi (The Earth)	Hidden footage from BUMP OF CHICKEN LIVE 2022 Silver Jubilee at Makuhari Messe
Unknown	Asayake (Morning Glow)	Hidden footage from BUMP OF CHICKEN TOUR Homeship Satellite 2024 at Ariake Arena

== Appearance ==
=== Regular program ===
- bayfm・Pontsuka!! (since October 3, 1999）

=== Past appearances / Past programs ===
==== Radio ====
bayfm "Neo Stream Night" - "Viva!!Longfellow" (October 4, 1998 – October 25, 1998)

- Nippon Broadcasting System BUMP OF CHICKEN's allnightnippon-r (Weekly Tuesday 2nd part regular) (December 2001 – March 2002)
- JFN BUMP OF CHICKEN Produce Super Edition (August 2004)
- Tokyo FM "School of Lock!" - "Bump Locks!" (October 5, 2005 – December 27, 2005, December 4, 2007 – February 26, 2008, October 4, 2010 – March 28, 2011, March 6, 2014 – March 27, 2014)
- NHK Radio 1 "Rajiru Labo" - "Rabo Talk" (May 17, 2021)

==== Television ====
- Space Shower TV Bump TV - Men'Experience (April 2001 – March 2002)
- JAPAN COUNTDOWN / MUSIC STATION (TV Tokyo, December 19, 2010)
- JAPAN COUNTDOWN / MUSIC STATION (TV Tokyo, October 2, 2011)
- JAPAN COUNTDOWN / MUSIC STATION (TV Asahi, July 25, 2014) – First terrestrial performance.
  - Song performed: "Niji o Matsu Hito", "RAY"
- SONGS (NHK General, December 5, 2015)
  - Songs performed: "Tentai Kansoku", "Hana no Na", "RAY", "Glass Blues"
- 66th NHK Kohaku Uta Gassen (NHK General, December 31, 2015)
  - Song performed: "RAY"
  - Note: Performance from Countdown Japan 15/16 (Makuhari Messe) was broadcast live.
- SONGS (NHK General, February 13, 2016)
  - Songs performed: "Hello, world!", "Sharin no Uta", "supernova", "Butterfly"
- Music Station (TV Asahi, October 19, 2018)
  - Song performed: "Hanashi ga Shitaiyo"
- SONGS (NHK General, February 27, 2021)
  - Note: Appearance by three members, excluding Naoi, who was on hiatus at the time.
  - Songs performed: "Acacia", "Aurora", "Flare", "Mahou no Ryouri ~Kimi kara Kimi e~"
- 72nd NHK Kohaku Uta Gassen (NHK General, December 31, 2021)
  - Songs performed: "Tentai Kansoku", "Nana-iro" (Both were pre-recorded)
- BUMP OF CHICKEN 18 Sai (NHK General, March 31, 2023)
  - Song performed: "Mado no Naka kara" (Performance with 1000 people from the 18-year-old generation)
- Kanjam Kanzen Nen Show (TV Asahi, April 2 & 16, 2023)
  - April 2 broadcast: Only Fujiwara appeared
  - April 16 broadcast: All four members appeared (both were VTR appearances)
- CDTV Live! Live! (TBS, September 2, 2024)
  - Songs performed: "Nana-iro", "RAY", "SOUVENIR", "Sleep Walking Orchestra", "Chronostasis", "Tentai Kansoku", "Acacia" (Appearing on BUMP OF CHICKEN Fes)
- CDTV Live! Live! (TBS, September 9, 2024)
  - Song performed: "Strawberry"

=== NHK Kohaku Uta Gassen appearances ===
Year	Broadcast	Episode	Song	Performance Order	Notes
2015	66th	First appearance	RAY	19/26	Broadcast live from Makuhari Messe.
2021	72nd	2nd appearance	Tentai Kansoku, Nana-iro	19/22	

==== Movies ====
- BUMP OF CHICKEN "WILLPOLIS 2014" Theatrical Version (Released December 5, 2014)
- Note: Available for a limited two-week screening until December 18, 2014.

Commercials (CM)

- Apple Music "Rediscover 'Tentai Kansoku' with Dolby Atmos Spatial Audio" (March 25, 2022 – present)

== Awards ==
Year	Nominee / Work	Award
2004	Lost Man	SPACE SHOWER Music Video Awards 2004・BEST YOUR CHOICE
2005	Song of the Wheel	SPACE SHOWER Music Video Awards 2005・BEST YOUR CHOICE
2005	Yggdrasil	19th Japan Gold Disc Awards Rock & Pop Album of the Year (Japanese Music Category)
2007	Puppet Show Guild	SPACE SHOWER Music Video Awards 2007・BEST CREATIVE WORK
2007	Flower Name	FM FESTIVAL RADIO AWARD IN JAPAN "LIFE MUSIC 2007"・LIFE MUSIC OF THE YEAR (Grand Prize)
2008	Flower Name	SPACE SHOWER Music Video Awards 2008・Best Video of the Year
2008	Flower Name	SPACE SHOWER Music Video Awards 2008・Best Your Choice
2008	Flower Name	SPACE SHOWER Music Video Awards 2008・Best Group Video
2010	Letter to an Astronaut	iTunes Rewind 2010 Best Song (Rock Category)
2013	BUMP OF CHICKEN GOLD GLIDER TOUR 2012	Music Jacket Awards 2013 – Music Video Award
2014	Niji o Matsu Hito	Space Shower Music Video Awards 2014・Best Your Choice
2014	BUMP OF CHICKEN	iTunes Best of 2014 Best Artist of the Year
2015	RAY	Space Shower Music Video Awards 2015・Best Your Choice
2016	BUMP OF CHICKEN	Space Shower Music Awards 2016・People's Choice
2019	Aurora	MTV Video Music Awards Japan 2019 – Best Rock Video
2020	Aurora	Space Shower Music Awards 2020・Best Video of the Year
2025	Iris	17th CD Shop Awards 2025 Winner (Red)
2026	I	10th Crunchyroll Anime Awards - Best Ending Sequence
