= The Living Dead (Bump of Chicken album) =

Studio album by Bump of Chicken
- Released: March 25, 2000
- Recorded: 1999–2000
- Genre: J-pop, rock
- Length: 41:48
- Label: High Line Records; HLR-011

Bump of Chicken chronology
Flame Vein (1999)	The Living Dead (2000)	Jupiter (2002)

The Living Dead is the second studio album by Bump of Chicken, first released on March 25, 2000, on High Line Records. It was released again on April 28, 2004, on Toy's Factory.

== Track listing ==
All tracks written by Fujiwara Motoo, except where noted.

1. "Opening" — 1:03
2. "Gungnir" (グングニル, Gunguniru) — 3:56
3. "Best Picture" (ベストピクチャー, Bestipikuchā) (Fujiwara, Naoi Yoshifumi) — 4:41
4. "Another Trifling Song" (続・くだらない唄, Zoku Kudaranai Uta) — 5:13
5. "Lamp" — 4:32
6. "K" — 3:51
7. "Lily" (リリィ, Rirī) — 5:35
8. "Ever Lasting Lie" — 8:37
9. "Glorious Revolution" (グロリアスレボリューション, Guroriasureboryūshon) — 3:13
10. "Ending" — 1:14
11. "The Living Dead" (hidden track)

== Personnel ==
- Fujiwara Motoo — Guitar, vocals
- Masukawa Hiroaki — Guitar
- Naoi Yoshifumi — Bass
- Masu Hideo — Drums
