= Radwimps discography =

Recordings by Japanese rock band

- Studio albums: 14
- Extended plays: 2
- Compilation albums: 1
- Singles: 32
- Video albums: 10

The discography of the Japanese rock band Radwimps consists of fourteen studio albums, ten video albums, and 32 singles. Radwimps debuted as a musical act in 2003 through independent label Newtraxx, releasing the albums Radwimps (2003) and Radwimps 2: Hatten Tojō (2005). After being signed to major label Toshiba EMI, the band released their album Radwimps 3: Mujintō ni Motte Ikiwasureta Ichimai to increasing commercial success.

Radwimps have had several commercially successful songs, including "Futarigoto" (2006) which was certified Platinum by the RIAJ. Their singles "Order Made" (2008) and "Dada" (2011) both peaked at the top of Oricon's singles charts. Many Radwimps songs that were not released as singles were successful in the digital market, and have been certified gold.

Their 2016 single "Zenzenzense" is the most popular song by the band, having reached more than 320 million views on their YouTube channel. The song was used as one of the four theme songs to the anime film Your Name. (君の名は。, Kimi no Na wa.), and was one of 26 songs the band composed for the film's soundtrack. It reached number-one on the Billboard Japan Hot 100 and charted for 63 weeks. It also received a digital download song certification of Triple Platinum from the Recording Industry Association of Japan for sales of 750,000.

== Studio albums ==
List of studio albums, showing selected details, chart positions sales, and certifications
Title	Details	Peak positions		Sales	Certifications
Title	Details	JPN	JPN Hot	Sales	Certifications
Radwimps	Released: 2 July 2003 (JPN); Label: Newtraxx; Formats: CD, digital download	40	—	JPN: 91,000	RIAJ: Gold (phy.)
Radwimps 2: Hatten Tojō (発展途上)	Released: 8 March 2005 (JPN); Label: Newtraxx; Formats: CD, digital download	43	—	JPN: 98,000	
Radwimps 3: Mujintō ni Motte Ikiwasureta Ichimai (無人島に持っていき忘れた一枚)	Released: 15 February 2006 (JPN); Label: Toshiba EMI; Formats: CD, digital download	13	37	JPN: 189,000	RIAJ: Platinum (phy.)
Radwimps 4: Okazu no Gohan (おかずのごはん)	Released: 6 December 2006 (JPN); Label: Toshiba EMI; Formats: CD, digital download	5	39	JPN: 345,000	RIAJ: Platinum (phy.)
Altocolony no Teiri (アルトコロニーの定理)	Released: 11 March 2009 (JPN); Label: EMI Music Japan; Formats: CD, digital download	2	30	JPN: 343,000	RIAJ: Platinum (phy.)
Zettai Zetsumei (絶体絶命)	Released: 9 March 2011 (JPN); Label: EMI Music Japan; Formats: CD, digital download	2	34	JPN: 269,000	RIAJ: Platinum (phy.)
Batsu to Maru to Tsumi to (×と○と罪と)	Released: 11 December 2013 (JPN); Label: EMI Records Japan; Formats: CD, digital download	2	40	JPN: 140,000	RIAJ: Platinum (phy.)
Your Name (君の名は。)	Released: 24 August 2016 (JPN); Label: EMI Records; Formats: CD, digital download	1	1	JPN: 500,000+	RIAJ: 2× Platinum (phy.); Gold (dig.)
Human Bloom (人間開花)	Released: 23 November 2016 (JPN); Label: EMI Records; Formats: CD, digital download	1	1	JPN: 311,000	RIAJ: Platinum (phy.)
Anti Anti Generation	Released: 12 December 2018 (JPN); Label: EMI Records; Formats: CD, digital download	1	1	JPN: 100,000	RIAJ: Gold (phy.)
Weathering with You (天気の子)	Released: 19 July 2019 (JPN); Label: EMI Records; Formats: CD, digital download	2	1	JPN: 100,000	RIAJ: Gold (phy.)
Forever Daze	Released: 23 November 2021; Label: EMI Records; Formats: CD, digital download	3	3	JPN: 29,505	
Suzume (すずめの戸締まり) (with Kazuma Jinnouchi)	Released: 11 November 2022; Label: EMI Records; Formats: CD, digital download	7	3		
Anew (あにゅー)	Released: 8 October 2025; Label: EMI Records; Formats: CD, digital download	1	1	JPN: 52,965	
"—" denotes releases that did not chart.

== Compilation albums ==
Title	Details	Peak chart positions	
Title	Details	JPN	JPN Hot
2+0+2+1+3+1+1= 10 Years 10 Songs	Released: 11 March 2021 (JPN); Label: EMI Records; Formats: CD, digital download	3	3

== Extended plays ==
List of extended plays, with selected chart positions
Title	Details	Peak chart positions	
Title	Details	JPN	JPN Hot
Your Name (English Edition)	Released: 27 January 2017 (JPN); Label: EMI Records; Formats: CD, digital download	6	— (Note: The extended play was ineligible to chart on the Billboard Japan Hot 100.)
Blame Summer EP (夏のせい ep, Natsu no Sei)	Released: 2 September 2020 (JPN); Label: EMI Records; Formats: CD, digital download	4	4
"—" denotes releases that did not chart.

== Singles ==
List of singles, showing year released, selected chart positions, sales, certifications, and album name
Title	Year	Peak chart positions				Sales	Certifications	Album
Title	Year	JPN	JPN Hot	KOR	WW Excl. US	Sales	Certifications	Album
"Moshi mo" (もしも)	2003	—	—	—	—			Radwimps
"Kiseki" (祈跡)	2004	38	—	—	—	JPN: 10,000		Radwimps 2
"Hekkushun" (へっくしゅん)	2005	168	—	—	—	JPN: 700		Radwimps 3
"Kanashi" (愛し)	2005	168	—	—	—	JPN: 700		Radwimps 2
"Nijūgoko-me no Senshokutai" (25コ目の染色体)	2005	45	—	—	—	JPN: 9,000	RIAJ: Gold (flr.)	Radwimps 3
"EDP ~Tonde Hi ni Iru Natsu no Kimi~" (イーディーピー ～飛んで火に入る夏の君～)	2006	32	—	—	—	JPN: 6,000		Radwimps 3
"Futarigoto" (ふたりごと)	2006	16	89	—	—	JPN: 27,000	RIAJ: Platinum (flr.); Gold (st.)	Radwimps 4
"Yūshinron" (有心論)	2006	13	76	—	—	JPN: 34,000	RIAJ: Gold (flr.); Platinum (st.)	Radwimps 4
"Setsuna Rensa" (セツナレンサ)	2006	4	—	—	—	JPN: 31,000		Radwimps 4
"Order Made" (オーダーメイド)	2008	1	3	—	—	JPN: 116,000	RIAJ: Gold (phy.); Gold (flr.)	Altocolony no Teiri
"Manifesto" (マニフェスト)	2010	2	3	—	—	JPN: 78,000	RIAJ: Gold (flr.)	Non-album single
"Keitai Denwa" (携帯電話)	2010	3	2	—	—	JPN: 76,000		Zettai Zetsumei
"Dada"	2011	1	1	—	—	JPN: 121,000	RIAJ: Gold (phy.)	Zettai Zetsumei
"Kyōshinshō" (狭心症)	2011	2	2	—	—	JPN: 85,000	RIAJ: Gold (phy.)	Zettai Zetsumei
"Sprechchor" (シュプレヒコール)	2012	4	3	—	—	JPN: 68,000		Non-album single
"Dreamer's High" (ドリーマーズ・ハイ)	2013	6	3	—	—	JPN: 39,000		Batsu to Maru to Tsumi to
"Gogatsu no Hae" (五月の蝿)	2013	3	3	—	—	JPN: 58,000		Batsu to Maru to Tsumi to
"Last Virgin" (ラストバージン)	2013	3	8	—	—	JPN: 58,000	RIAJ: Platinum (st.)	Batsu to Maru to Tsumi to
"Picnic" (ピクニック)	2015	7	14	—	—	JPN: 21,000		Non-album single
"'I' Novel"	2015	13	43	—	—	JPN: 21,000		Human Bloom
"Kigō to Shite" (記号として)	2015	13	23	—	—	JPN: 21,000		Human Bloom
"Saihate Aini" (サイハテアイニ)	2017	2	2	—	—		RIAJ: Gold (dig.)	Anti Anti Generation
"Sennō" (洗脳)	2017	2	20	—	—			Anti Anti Generation
"Mountain Top"	2018	10	14	—	—			Anti Anti Generation
"Shape of Miracle"	2018	10	—	—	—			Non-album single
"Catharsist" (カタルシスト)	2018	5	7	—	—			Anti Anti Generation
"Blame Summer" (夏のせい)	2020	—	45	—	—			Blame Summer EP
"Iron Feather"	2021	—	42	—	—			Forever Daze
"Twilight"	2021	—	77	—	—			Forever Daze
"Utakata Uta" (うたかた歌) (Solo or featuring Masaki Suda)	2021	—	50	—	—			Forever Daze
"Suzume" (すずめ) (featuring Toaka)	2022	—	12	109	133		RIAJ: Gold (dig.); Platinum (st.)	Suzume
"Kanata Haluka" (カナタハルカ)	2022	—	13	—	—		RIAJ: Platinum (st.)	Suzume
"Dai-Dan-En" (大団円) (featuring Zorn)	2023	—	91	—	—			Anew
"Seikai" (正解)	2024	15	15	—	—		RIAJ: Platinum (st.)	Anew
"Tamamono" (賜物)	2025	—	9	—	—			Anew
"Meidai" (命題)	2025	—	69	—	—			Anew
"World End Girl Friend" (ワールドエンドガールフレンド)	2025	—	53	—	—			Anew
"Yuzutsu" (夕星-ゆうづつ-)	2026	—	19	—	—			Non-album singles
"You, Like a Star" (汝、星のごとく)	2026	—	73	—	—			Non-album singles
"Shabadaba" (娑婆堕罵)	2026	—	34	—	—			Non-album singles
"—" denotes releases that did not chart or were not released in that territory.

=== Promotional singles ===
Title	Year	Peak chart positions	Certifications	Album
Title	Year	JPN Hot	Certifications	Album
"Iin Desu ka?" (いいんですか?; "Is It Okay?")	2006	28	RIAJ: Gold (flr.); Platinum (st.)	Radwimps 4
"Me Me She"	2006	64	RIAJ: Gold (flr.); 2× Platinum (st.)	Radwimps 4
"Amaotoko" (雨音子)	2009	48		Altocolony no Teiri
"Oshakashama" (おしゃかしゃま)	2009	32	RIAJ: Gold (flr.); Gold (st.)	Altocolony no Teiri
"Tayuta" (タユタ)	2009	81		Altocolony no Teiri
"Kimi to Hitsuji to Ao" (君と羊と青)	2011	19	RIAJ: Platinum (dig.); 2× Platinum (st.)	Zettai Zetsumei
"Reunion" (リユニオン)	2013	81		Batsu to Maru to Tsumi to
"Iron Bible" (アイアンバイブル)	2013	90		Batsu to Maru to Tsumi to
"Kaishin no Ichigeki" (会心の一撃)	2013	11	RIAJ: Gold (dig.); Platinum (st.)	Batsu to Maru to Tsumi to
"Zenzenzense" (前前前世)	2016	1	RIAJ (download): Million; RIAJ (streaming): Platinum	Your Name and Human Bloom
"Sparkle" (スパークル)	2016	4	RIAJ (download): 2x Platinum (dig.); RIAJ (streaming): Platinum	Your Name and Human Bloom
"Hikari" (光)	2016	20		Human Bloom
"Is There Still Anything That Love Can Do?" (愛にできることはまだあるかい)	2019	3	RIAJ: Platinum (dig.); Gold (st.)	Weathering with You
"Makafuka"	2021	—		Forever Daze
"—" denotes releases that did not chart.

== Other charted and certified songs ==
Title	Year	Peak chart positions	Certifications	Album
Title	Year	JPN Hot	Certifications	Album
"Mr. September" (セプテンバーさん)	2006	47	RIAJ: Platinum (st.)	Radwimps 3
"Saidai Kōyakusū" (最大公約数)	2006	—	RIAJ: Platinum (dig.); Gold (flr.); Gold (st.)	Radwimps 3
"Tremolo" (トレモロ)	2006	—	RIAJ: Platinum (st.)	Radwimps 3
"Okoshite" (05410-（ん）; "Wake Me Up")	2006	—	RIAJ: Gold (dig.); Platinum (st.)	Radwimps 4
"Hyperventilation" (ハイパーベンチレイション)	2010	—		Keitai Denwa
"Yadokari" (やどかり)	2010	—		Manifesto
"Ruru" (縷々)	2011	76		Dada
"Jugemu" (寿限夢)	2011	—		Kyōshinshō
"Shuntō" (春灯)	2016	44		2+0+2+1+3+1+1= 10 Years 10 Songs
"Dream Lantern" (夢灯籠)	2016	7	RIAJ: Platinum (dig.); Platinum (st.)	Your Name
"Nandemonaiya" (なんでもないや)	2016	4	RIAJ: 2× Platinum (dig.); Platinum (st.)	Your Name
"Shūkan Shōnen Jump" (週刊少年ジャンプ)	2016	71		Human Bloom
"Bouningen" (棒人間)	2016	23	RIAJ: Gold (dig.)	Human Bloom
"Ikijibiki" (featuring Taka)	2018	24		Anti Anti Generation
"Sokkenai" (そっけない)	2018	35	RIAJ: Gold (dig.); 2× Platinum (st.)	Anti Anti Generation
"Nakidashisodayo" (泣き出しそうだよ) (featuring Aimyon)	2018	56		Anti Anti Generation
"Grand Escape" (グランドエスケープ) (featuring Tōko Miura)	2019	9	RIAJ: Platinum (dig.); Gold (st.)	Weathering with You
"We'll Be Alright" (大丈夫)	2019	24	RIAJ: Gold (dig.)	Weathering with You
"Ms. Phenomenal" (うるうびと)	2022	16	RIAJ: Gold (st.)	The Last Ten Years (Original Soundtrack)
"—" denotes releases that did not chart.

== Video albums ==
List of media, with selected chart positions
Title	Album details	Peak positions		Certifications
Title	Album details	JPN DVD	JPN Blu-ray	Certifications
Radwimps 4.5	Music video collection; Released: 7 February 2007; Label: Toshiba EMI; Formats: DVD	1	—	
Nama Harumaki (生春巻き)	Recording of Radwimps Tour 2007 "Harumaki"; Released: 11 July 2007; Label: Toshiba EMI; Formats: DVD	2	—	RIAJ: Gold (phy.)
Zettai Enmei (絶体延命)	Recording of Radwimps "Zettai Enmei" Tour; Released: 11 January 2012; Label: EMI Music Japan; Formats: DVD, Blu-ray	1	1	
Radwimps Live & Document 2014	Released: 3 December 2014; Label: Universal; Formats: DVD, Blu-ray	1	3	
Ao to Mememe (青とメメメ)	Released: 16 September 2015; Label: Universal; Formats: DVD, Blu-ray	3	6	
Radwimps no Hesonoo Documentary Film (RADWIMPSのHESONOO Documentary Film)	Released: 18 January 2017; Label: Universal; Formats: DVD, Blu-ray	3	7	
RADWIMPS Live DVD [Human Bloom Tour 2017]	Released: 18 October 2017; Label: Universal; Formats: DVD, Blu-ray	2	2	
Your Name Orchestra Concert	Released: 18 April 2018; Label: Toho; Formats: DVD, Blu-ray	17	12	
Road to Catharsis Tour 2018	Released: 12 December 2018; Label: Universal; Formats: DVD, Blu-ray	2	3	
Anti Anti Generation Tour 2019	Released: 18 March 2020; Label: Universal; Formats: DVD, Blu-ray	5	4	
Forever in the Daze Tour 2021-2022	Released: 19 April, 2023; Label: Universal; Formats; DVD, Blu-ray	5	4	
Back to the Live House Tour 2023	Released: 3 April, 2024; Label: Universal; Formats: DVD, Blu-ray	5	3	
Radwimps 20th Anniversary Live Tour	Released: 12 August, 2026; Label: Universal; Formats: DVD, Blu-ray	2	1	
"—" denotes a recording that did not chart or was not released in that territory.

== Music videos ==
Year	Title	Director(s)
2004	"Kiseki"	Tony Chang
2005	"Hekkushun"	Atsushi Takahata
2005	"Kanashi"	Daisuke Shimada
2005	"Nijūgoko-me no Senshokutai"	Shimada
2006	"EDP (Tonde Hi ni Iru Natsu no Kimi)"	Shimada
2006	"Otogi" (おとぎ; "Fairy Tale")	Shimada
2006	"Futarigoto"	Shimada
2006	"Yūshinron"	Kanji Suto
2006	"Setsuna Rensa"	Suto
2006	"Me Me She"	Shimada
2006	"Ii n Desu ka?"	Shimada
2008	"Order Made"	Yuichi Kodama
2009	"Oshakashama"	Yasunori Kakegawa, Tetsuya Nagato
2009	"Sakebe" (叫べ; "Scream!")	Kakegawa
2009	"Tayuta" (タユタ)	Kakegawa
2010	"Keitai Denwa"	Sho Tsukikawa
2010	"Manifesto"	Nao
2011	"Dada"	Yasuhiko Shimizu
2011	"Kyōshinshō"	Kensaku Kakimoto
2011	"Kimi to Hitsuji to Ao"	Shimada, Sōjirō Kamatani
