= Oricon Combined Albums Chart =

Weekly national album chart by Oricon

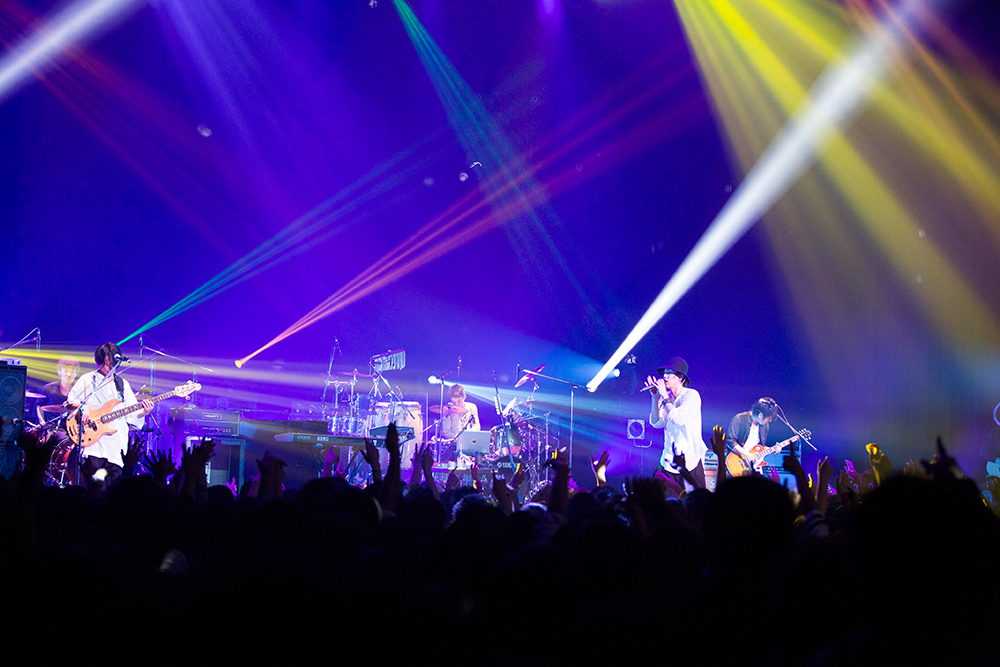
With their album Anti Anti Generation (2018), rock band Radwimps (pictured in 2016) topped the first issue of the Oricon Combined Albums Chart.

The Oricon Combined Albums Chart (Japanese: オリコン合算アルバムランキング, Hepburn: Orikon Gassan Arubamu Rankingu) is a record chart released weekly by Oricon, a major provider of information on the Japanese music industry. First published on December 24, 2018, it ranks the top fifty albums through an equivalent unit system based on physical CD sales, digital downloads, and the streaming of songs. The Oricon Albums Chart (active since 1987) only factors physical sales. The Combined Albums Chart competes with Billboard Japan's Hot Albums, another multi-factor record chart.

== Methodology and history ==
The Oricon Albums Chart was established in 1987 and ranks albums based on physical sales alone. Oricon established a downloads-only albums chart, the Digital Albums Chart, in November 2016. On August 29, 2018, Oricon announced that they would launch new charts combining their physical and digital albums/singles charts. The new charts would factor in CD sales, digital downloads, and streaming, like the Japan Hot 100 and Hot Albums charts published by competitor Billboard Japan. Alongside the Combined Singles and Streaming Singles Charts, the Oricon Combined Albums Chart was launched with the issue dated December 24, 2018; Anti Anti Generation, the tenth album by rock band Radwimps, was the inaugural number one.

The Oricon Combined Albums Chart compiles the top fifty albums of the week based on CD sales, digital downloads of both albums and their included songs, and streaming. An album-equivalent unit system is used: physical purchases and downloads of albums are worth one point; downloads of a song from an album is worth 0.4 points; the stream of a song is worth 0.00069 points (1,440 streams required for one point).

Statistics for the chart are collected from Mondays to Sundays. As of August 2024, numbers for digital downloads are taken from iTunes, Amazon Music, the official Oricon store, RecoChoku-owned services, Avex's Mu-mo, Music.jp, and Mora; streaming statistics are adapted from Apple Music, Amazon, AWA, Au Smartpass, KKBox, Spotify, Tower Records Music, YouTube and YouTube Music, Line Music, and Rakuten Music; physical sales are reported from various record stores, rental stores, electronics stores, convenience stores, and online shopping sites.

== Number-ones by year ==
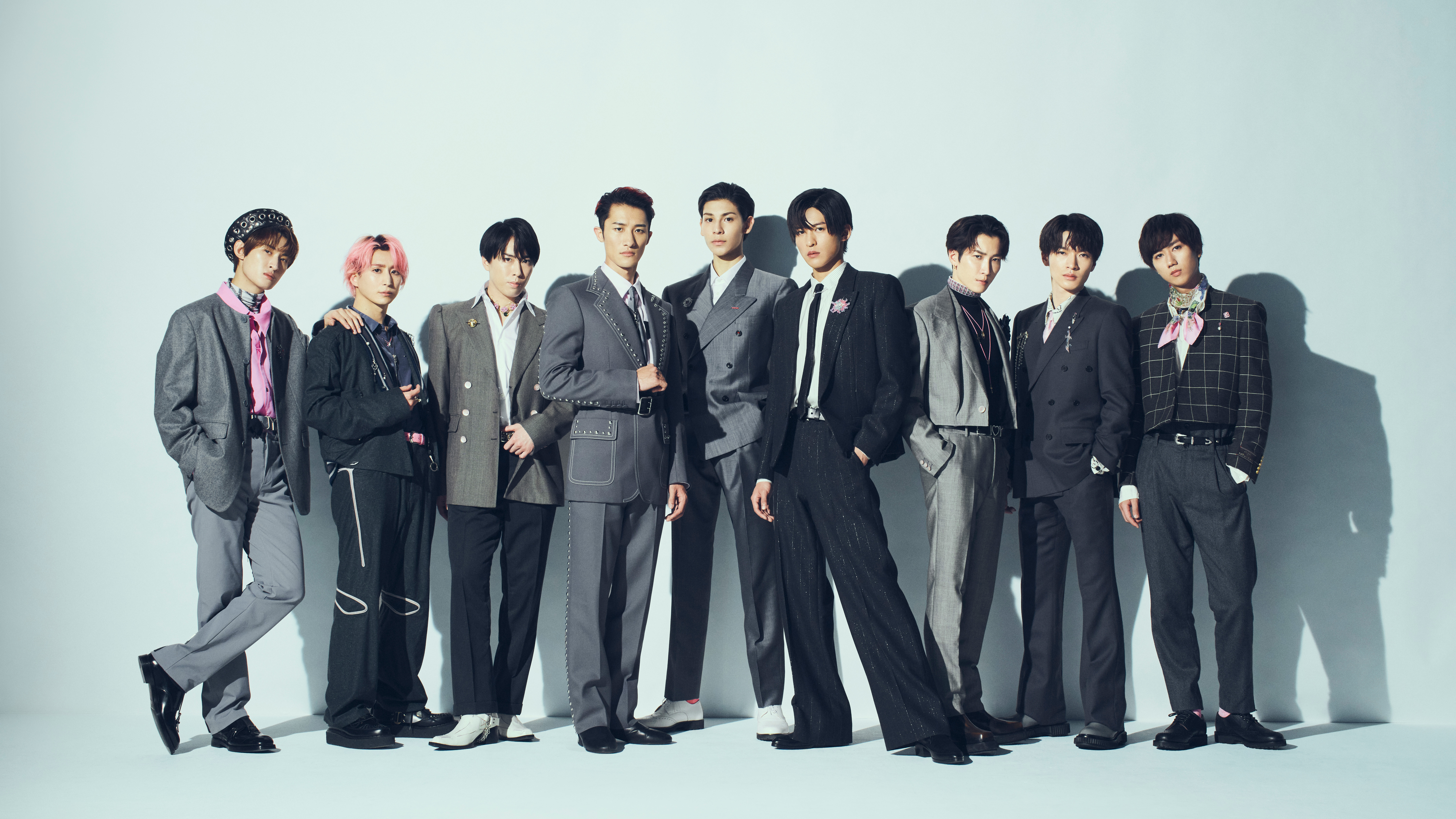
The boy band Snow Man (pictured in 2023) have topped two year-end Combined Albums Charts: in 2022 with Snow Labo. S2 and in 2024 with Rays.

Key
†	Indicates the highest score of all year-end charts

List of year-end number ones on the Oricon Combined Albums Chart
Year	Album	Artist	Points	Ref.
2019	5x20 All the Best!! 1999–2019	Arashi	2,100,438†	
2020	Stray Sheep	Kenshi Yonezu	1,970,930	
2021	BTS, the Best	BTS	1,066,156	
2022	Snow Labo. S2	Snow Man	986,018	
2023	Mr.5	King & Prince	1,399,236	
2024	Rays	Snow Man	1,162,227	
2025	The Best 2020–2025	Snow Man	1,896,674	
