= 大丈夫 =

大丈夫 (Hanyu Pinyin: Dàzhàngfū; Japanese pronunciation: Daijōbu) may refer to:

- "It's All Right!!!" (大丈夫!!!), a name of the chapter 113 and the volume 13 in the Manga One Piece
- "Just Fine" (大丈夫), a name of the chapter 10 in the Manga Kindergarten Wars
- "We'll Be Alright" (大丈夫), a name of the track in the album Weathering with You by Japanese rock band Radwimps
- Men Suddenly in Black, a 2003 Hong Kong films

== See also ==
- The dictionary definition of 大丈夫 at Wiktionary
- The dictionary definition of 大 at Wiktionary
- The dictionary definition of 丈 at Wiktionary
- The dictionary definition of 夫 at Wiktionary
