= Anew =

Anew may refer to:

- Anau, Turkmenistan
- Anew (album), by Radwimps, 2025
- Anew McMaster (1891–1962), British actor

== See also ==
- New (disambiguation)
