= List of Oricon number-one albums of 2018 =

The following is a list of Oricon number-one albums of 2018. Oricon supplies statistics and information on music and the music industry in Japan. It is also the first year where the combined albums chart was introduced, which is based on physical and digital sales, as well as streaming. The first number-one album on the combined chart was Radwimps' Anti Anti Generation on December 24.

== Chart history ==
=== Physical sales ===
Number-one albums on the weekly Oricon physical albums chart
Issue date	Album	Artist(s)	Reference(s)
January 1	Tomo Arite...	Boys and Men	
January 8	092	HKT48	
January 15	WESTival	Johnny's West	
January 22	Boku dake no Kimi〜Under Super Best〜	Nogizaka46	
January 29	Everybody!!!	Wanima	
February 5	Bokutachi wa, Ano Hi no Yoake wo Shitteiru	AKB48	
February 12	Countdown	Exo	
February 19	Hatachi no Morning Musume	Morning Musume 20th	
February 26	XYZ=repainting	Sexy Zone	
March 5	I	Juju	
March 12	The Greatest Showman: Original Motion Picture Soundtrack	Various Artists	
March 19	Best	Daichi Miura	
March 26	Toys Blood Music	Kazuyoshi Saito	
April 2	Epcotia	NEWS	
April 9	Sakanazukan	Sakanaction	
April 16	Face Yourself	BTS	
April 23	Yuming kara no, Koi no Uta.	Yumi Matsutoya	
April 30	Shinee the Best from Now On	Shinee	
May 7	Yummy!!	Kis-My-Ft2	
May 14	Hybrid Funk	Endrecheri	
May 21	Lisa Best -Way-	Lisa	
May 28	Magic	Exo-CBX	
June 4	Momoiro Clover Z Best	Momoiro Clover Z	
June 11	Gr8est	Kanjani Eight	
June 18	Future	Sandaime J Soul Brothers from Exile Tribe	
June 25	Kisses and Kills	The Oral Cigarettes	
July 2	Hashiridasu Shunkan	Hiragana Keyakizaka46	
July 9	Hatsukoi	Hikaru Utada	
July 16	V-enus	Urashimasakatasen	
July 23	Souzou	Junho	
July 30	Cast	KAT-TUN	
August 6	Star of Wish	Exile	
August 13	Umi no Oh, Yeah!!	Southern All Stars	
August 20	Umi no Oh, Yeah!!	Southern All Stars	
August 27	Future Pop	Perfume	
September 3	Sense or Love	Hey! Say! JUMP	
September 10	Color a Life	AAA	
September 17	Love Yourself: Answer	BTS	
September 24	BDZ	Twice	
October 1	Tomorrow	TVXQ	
October 8	Return	iKon	
October 15	Jūryoku to Kokyū	Mr. Children	
October 22	Jūryoku to Kokyū	Mr. Children	
October 29	Jūryoku to Kokyū	Mr. Children	
November 5	Ketsunopolis 11	Ketsumeishi	
November 12	Color*Iz	Iz*One	
November 19	Yes or Yes	Twice	
November 26	Mad Trigger Crew vs Matenrō	Mad Trigger Crew and Matenrō	
December 3	Love Collection 2: Pink	Kana Nishino	
December 10	Unleashed	Tomohisa Yamashita	
December 17	All Time Best 1998–2018	Kobukuro	
December 24	Anti Anti Generation	Radwimps	
December 31	Pop Virus	Gen Hoshino	

=== Combined sales ===
Number-one albums on the weekly Oricon Combined Albums chart
Issue date	Album	Artist(s)	Reference(s)
December 24	Anti Anti Generation	Radwimps	
December 31	Pop Virus	Gen Hoshino	

== See also ==
- List of Oricon number-one singles of 2018
