= Suzume (disambiguation) =

Suzume is a 2022 Japanese animated film written and directed by Makoto Shinkai.

Suzume (雀、すずめ) may also refer to:

- Eurasian tree sparrow, a species of bird known in Japanese as suzume
- Suzume (album), the soundtrack album to the film
- "Suzume" (song), a 1981 song by Japanese singer Keiko Masuda
- Suzume Odori, a Japanese folk dance
- Suzume (wrestler), a Japanese wrestler
