= Tōko Miura =

Japanese actress and singer (born 1996)

- Born: 20 October 1996 (age 29); Sapporo, Hokkaido, Japan
- Occupations: Actress; singer
- Years active: 2002-present

Tōko Miura (Japanese: 三浦透子, Hepburn: Miura Tōko; born October 20, 1996) is a Japanese actress and singer. She is best known internationally for her role in the 2021 film Drive My Car as well as her work on the soundtrack of the 2019 animated film Weathering with You. Miura collaborated with the band Radwimps on said soundtrack and most notably made the song "Grand Escape (グランドエスケープ)," which peaked at No. 9 on the Billboard Japan Hot 100.

== Filmography ==
=== Film ===
Year	Title	Role	Notes	Ref
2012	Lesson of the Evil	Saori Yokota		
2013	Girl in the Sunny Place	Shiota		
2015	Our Huff and Puff Journey	Fumiko		
2017	Tsukiko	Tsukiko	Lead role	
2018	Dynamite Graffiti	Fueko		
2020	Ora, Ora Be Goin' Alone	Unknown		
2020	Romance Doll	Hiroko		
2020	Ainu Mosir	Junior High School Teacher		
2021	Spaghetti Code Love	Cocoro		
2021	A Garden of Camellias	Unknown		
2021	Drive My Car	Misaki Watari		
2021	What She Likes...	Nao Sakura		
2022	I Am What I Am	Kasumi Sobata	Lead role	
2023	Trapped Balloon	Rinko		
2023	Mountain Woman	Haru		
2024	Adabana		French-Japanese film	
2026	Mystery Arena	Sango		

=== Television ===
Year	Title	Role	Notes	Ref
2007	ChocoMimi	Mumu Momoyama		
2011	Inside Mr. Suzuki's Classroom	Akira Kabayama		
2017	Fictitious Girl's Diary	Kaorin		
2022	Come Come Everybody	Ichie Noda	Asadora	
2022	The 13 Lords of the Shogun	Sato	Taiga drama	
2022	Modern Love Tokyo	Rika	Episode 3	
2022	Elpis	Sakura Ōyama		
2023	Ōoku: The Inner Chambers	Tokugawa Ieshige		
2026	Straight to Hell	Chiyoko Shimakura		

== Awards and nominations ==
Year	Award	Category	Work(s)	Result	Ref.
2023	23th Nippon Connection	Nippon Rising Star Award	Herself	Won	
