= Maki Sakai =

Japanese actress (born 1970)

- Born: May 17, 1970 (age 56); Taito, Tokyo
- Occupation: Actress
- Years active: 1992–present

Maki Sakai (坂井 真紀) (born May 17, 1970 in Taito, Tokyo) is a Japanese actress.

== Filmography ==
=== Film ===
- Time Leap (1997)
- United Red Army (2007), Mieko Tōyama
- Kano (2014)
- Too Young to Die! (2016), Yoshie
- My Friend "A" (2018)
- 108: Revenge and Adventure of Goro Kaiba (2019), Mari Kaiba
- Show Me the Way to the Station (2019)
- The Flowers of Evil (2019)
- Black School Rules (2019), Mari Machida
- Fictitious Girl's Diary (2020)
- 461 Days of Bento: A Promise Between Father and Son (2020), Sakie Endō
- The Brightest Roof in the Universe (2020)
- Runway (2020)
- Peaceful Death (2021)
- Brothers in Brothel (2021)
- Baragaki: Unbroken Samurai (2021), Satō Nobu
- Every Trick in the Book (2021), Kanako
- I Am What I Am (2022), Natsumi Sobata
- Do Unto Others (2023)
- Father of the Milky Way Railroad (2023), Ichi Miyazawa
- Dreaming in Between (2023)
- The Water Flows to the Sea (2023)
- One Last Bloom (2023)
- Analog (2023), Yoko Asai
- My (K)night (2023)
- Let's Go Karaoke! (2024), Yuko Oka
- After the Fever (2024), Tamiko
- Manga Artist, Mamoru Hori (2024), Sara Sakura
- Who's Gone (2024), Hasebe
- Seaside Serendipity (2025), Shizuka
- Sai: Disaster (2026), Misae Okahashi
- The Intertwining (2027)
- Last Vacation (2027)

=== Television ===
- Double Kitchen (1993)
- Watashi no unmei (1994)
- Someday at a Place in the Sun (2013)
- Kaiki Renai Sakusen (2015)
- Haretsu (2015)
- Hitoshi Ueki and Nobosemon (2017)
- Kangoku no Ohimesama (2017), Yōko Daimon
- Yuganda Hamon (2019)
- Idaten (2019), Kimiko
- Welcome Home, Monet (2021), Minami Oikawa
- Bullets, Bones and Blocked Noses (2021), Yumeko Hōjō
- A Day-Off of Ryunosuke Kamiki (2022)
- The Hot Spot (2025), Eri Sawada
- Chosen Home (2025), Kyoko Inokashira
- Sai: Disaster (2026), Misae Okahashi
- Brothers in Arms (2026), Naka
- Did Someone Happen to Mention Me? (2026), Chijimi

=== Anime ===
- Michiko & Hatchin (2008)

Preceded by Chino Sachie	The fourth rehouse girl of Mitsui; 1990	Succeeded by Sae Isshiki
