= I Am What I Am (2022 film) =

- DVD cover
- Directed by: Shinya Tamada
- Written by: Atsushi Asada
- Produced by: Tatsuya Matsuoka; Yu Kato
- Starring: Tōko Miura; Atsuko Maeda; Marika Itō; Kuu Izima; Kou Maehara; Mizuki Maehara; Chizuru Asano; Reiko Tajima; Maki Sakai; Hiroki Miyake
- Cinematography: Kei Nakase
- Edited by: Keisuke Tominaga
- Music by: Izumi Matsuno
- Production company: (not) HEROINE movies
- Distributed by: Rabbit House
- Release date: December 16, 2022 (Japan)
- Country: Japan
- Language: Japanese

I Am What I Am (Japanese: そばかす, Hepburn: Sobakasu) is a Japanese film released on December 16, 2022, and is the third production by (not) HEROINE movies. It was written by Atsushi Asada, directed by Shinya Tamada, and stars Tōko Miura in the lead role.

The film is about Kasumi Sobata, an aromantic asexual woman struggling in an amatonormative world.

== Cast ==
- Tōko Miura as Kasumi 'Sobakasu' Sobata: A woman who works in a call center after abandoning her dreams of becoming a cellist. She has never experienced romantic attraction.
- Atsuko Maeda as Maho Yonaga: Kasumi's classmate from her days in middle school.
- Marika Itō as Mutsumi Shinohara: Kasumi's younger sister, who is married to an OB/GYN and expecting a child soon.
- Kuu Izima as Sho Kogure: A man who Kasumi is forced to attend a matchmaking meeting with by her mother.
- Kou Maehara as Tsuyoshi Yashiro: Kasumi's classmate from her days in grade school.
- Takumi Kitamura as Hikaru Tendo: Kasumi's coworker.
- Reiko Tajima as Miyako Sobata: Kasumi's grandmother.
- Maki Sakai as Natsumi Sobata: Kasumi and Mutsumi's mother. She hopes that Kasumi will get married soon.
- Hiroki Miyake as Junichi Sobata: Kasumi and Mutsumi's father.
