= Your Name (album) =

2016 soundtrack album by Radwimps

Soundtrack album by Radwimps
- Released: August 24, 2016
- Recorded: 2015
- Studios: Gateway Mastering (Portland, Maine, US)
- Genres: Alternative rock; post-rock; ambient; pop rock; film score; chamber music
- Length: 72:05
- Languages: Japanese; English
- Labels: EMI; Universal Japan
- Producer: Radwimps

Radwimps albums chronology
Batsu to Maru to Tsumi to (2013)	Your Name (2016)	Human Bloom (2016)

Singles from Your Name
- 1. "Zenzenzense" Released: July 25, 2016

Alternative cover
- English edition cover

Your Name (Japanese: 君の名は。, Hepburn: Kimi no Na wa.) is the eighth studio album by Japanese rock band Radwimps and the soundtrack for the 2016 Japanese animated film Your Name, released on August 24, 2016, by EMI Records and Universal Music Japan.

It debuted at #1 on Oricon's weekly album rankings on September 5, 2016, with 58,000 copies sold. It received an album certification of Double Platinum from the Recording Industry Association of Japan for sales of 500,000 in 2017. The album also charted on US Billboard. It peaked at #16 on Billboard Heatseekers Albums, #15 on Billboard Soundtracks Albums, and #2 on Billboard World Albums chart. The vocal tracks were re-recorded in English and became available digitally on January 27, 2017, with a CD release on March 10, 2017.

== Background ==
According to vocalist Yojiro Noda, it took almost a year and a half to make the entire score for Your Name movie. Director Makoto Shinkai, who is also a fan of the band, approached Noda through producer Genki Kawamura as soon as the production of movie was confirmed. When recording the soundtrack, the band was not able to see the actual animation until it was all finished, so they wrote music based on the script and words of the director, which caused many compositions to be adjusted to fit the animation. "It was really difficult to arrange music to fit the animation by the second," said guitarist Akira Kuwahara. "The songwriting process was moving forward at the same time with the animation so it influenced each other. The music changed the story, the lines, and if the new scene was created, we changed the music. It was a creative process," added Noda.

== Track listing ==
All music by Yojiro Noda, except where noted.

Your Name standard edition
No.	Title	Lyrics	Music	Length
1.	"Dream Lantern (夢灯籠, Yume Tōrō)"	Yojiro Noda	Noda	2:11
2.	"School Road (三葉の通学, Mitsuha No Tsūgaku)"			1:08
3.	"Itomori Highschool (糸守高校, Itomori Kōkō)"			1:51
4.	"First View of Tokyo (はじめての、東京, Hajimete no、Tōkyō)"			1:19
5.	"Café at Last (憧れカフェ, Akogare Kafe)"		Akira Kuwahara	1:32
6.	"Theme of Ms. Okudera (奥寺先輩のテーマ, Okudera Senpai no Tēma)"			2:07
7.	"Unusual Changes of Two (ふたりの異変, Futari no Ihen)"		Kuwahara	2:36
8.	"Zenzenzense (前前前世)" (-movie ver.)	Noda	Noda	4:45
9.	"Goshintai (御神体, Goshintai)"			3:27
10.	"Date (デート, Dēto)"			4:05
11.	"Autumn Festival (秋祭り, Akimatsuri)"			1:07
12.	"Evoking Memories (記憶を呼び起こす瀧, Kioku o Yobiokosu Taki)"			1:43
13.	"Visit to Hida (飛騨探訪, Hida Tambō)"			1:32
14.	"Disappeared Town (消えた町, Kieta Machi)"		Yusuke Takeda	1:55
15.	"Library (図書館, Toshokan)"		Takeda	1:43
16.	"The Night Inn (旅館の夜, Ryokan no Yoru)"		Takeda	1:33
17.	"Again to Goshintai (御神体へ再び, Goshintai e Futatabi)"			2:23
18.	"Kuchikamizake Trip (口噛み酒トリップ, Kuchikamizake Torippu)"			2:55
19.	"Council of War (作戦会議, Sakusen Kaigi)"			2:24
20.	"Persuading Mayor (町長説得, Chōchō Settoku)"		Takeda	2:49
21.	"Theme of Mitsuha (三葉のテーマ, Mitsuha no Tēma)"			4:06
22.	"Unseen Two (見えないふたり, Mienai Futari)"			0:53
23.	"Katawaredoki (かたわれ時, Kataware Doki; lit. 'broken piece of time')"			2:50
24.	"Sparkle (スパークル, Supākuru)" (- movie ver.)	Noda	Noda	8:57
25.	"Date 2 (デート2, Dēto Ni)"			2:09
26.	"Nandemonaiya (なんでもないや, Nande mo nai ya; lit. 'it's nothing')" (- movie edit.)	Noda	Noda	3:16
27.	"Nandemonaiya (なんでもないや, Nande mo nai ya; lit. 'it's nothing')" (- movie ver.)	Noda	Noda	5:44
Total length:				73:00

Your Name special limited edition – disc 2 (Blu-ray)
No.	Title	Length
1.	"Recording Scene (Note: Recording Scene (レコーディング風景, Rekodingu Fūkei))"
2.	"Piano Solo Studio Live (Performance: Yojiro Noda): "Mitsuha Theme" "Autumn Festival" (Note: Piano Solo Studio Live (Performance: Yojiro Noda): "Mitsuha Theme" "Autumn Festival" (ピアノソロスタジオライブ(演奏：野田洋次郎)：「三葉のテーマ」「秋祭り」, Piano Soro Sutajio Raibu（Ensō：Noda Yōjirō）：「Mitsuha no Tēma」「Akimatsuri」))"
3.	"Radwimps Visits Anime Production Studio (Note: Radwimps Visits Anime Production Studio (RADWIMPS、アニメーション制作スタジオ訪問の模様, RADWIMPS、Animēshon Seisaku Sutajio Hōmon no Moyō))"
4.	"Makoto Shinkai × Radwimps Dialogue (Note: Makoto Shinkai × Radwimps Dialogue (新海誠監督 × RADWIMPS 対談, Shinkai Makoto Kantoku × RADWIMPS Taidan))"
5.	"Interview with Director Makoto Shinkai (Note: Interview with Director Makoto Shinkai (新海誠監督インタビュー, Shinkai Makoto Kantoku Intabyū))"

All tracks are written by Yojiro Noda.

Your Name English edition
No.	Title	Length
1.	"Dream lantern" (English ver.)	2:10
2.	"Zenzenzense" (English ver.)	4:37
3.	"Sparkle" (English ver.)	6:49
4.	"Nandemonaiya lit. 'it's nothing'" (English ver.)	5:42
Total length:		19:18

Your Name deluxe edition – disc 1
No.	Title	Lyrics	Music	Length
1.	"Dream lantern" (English Version)	Noda	Noda	2:12
2.	"School road"			1:08
3.	"Itomori High School"			1:52
4.	"First view of Tokyo"			1:20
5.	"Cafe at last"		Kuwahara	1:32
6.	"Theme of Ms. Okudera"			2:07
7.	"Unusual changes of two"		Kuwahara	2:37
8.	"Zenzenzense" (English Version)	Noda	Noda	4:39
9.	"Goshintai"			3:28
10.	"Date"			4:06
11.	"Autumn festival"			1:08
12.	"Evoking memories"			1:43
13.	"Visit to Hida"			1:32
14.	"Disappeared town"		Takeda	1:56
15.	"Library"		Takeda	1:44
16.	"The night inn"		Takeda	1:34
17.	"Again to Goshintai"			2:23
18.	"Kuchikamizake trip"			2:55
19.	"Council of war"			2:24
20.	"Persuading mayor"		Takeda	2:49
21.	"Theme of Mitsuha"			4:06
22.	"Unseen two"			0:53
23.	"Katawaredoki lit. 'broken piece of time'"			2:50
24.	"Sparkle" (English Version)	Noda	Noda	6:51
25.	"Date 2"			2:09
26.	"Nandemonaiya lit. 'it's nothing'" (English Version)	Noda	Noda	5:42
Total length:				67:40

All tracks are written by Yojiro Noda.

Your Name deluxe edition – disc 2
No.	Title	Length
1.	"Dream lantern"	2:10
2.	"Zenzenzense" (- movie ver.)	4:45
3.	"Sparkle" (- movie ver.)	8:55
4.	"Nandemonaiyalit. 'it's nothing'" (- movie ver.)	5:44
Total length:		21:34

== Charts ==
Chart (2016)	Peak position
Japan Weekly Albums (Oricon)	1
Japan Hot Albums (Billboard)	1
Japan Top Albums Sales (Billboard)	1

Chart (2017)	Peak position
US Heatseekers Albums (Billboard)	16
US Soundtracks Albums (Billboard)	15
US World Albums (Billboard)	2

== Certifications ==
Region	Certification	Certified units/sales
Japan (RIAJ) Physical	2× Platinum	500,000^{^}
Japan (RIAJ) Digital	Gold	100,000^{*}
^{*} Sales figures based on certification alone.^{^} Shipments figures based on certification alone.

== Awards and nominations ==
Year	Award	Category	Result
2016	58th Japan Record Awards	Special Award	Won
2017	40th Japan Academy Prize	Outstanding Achievement in Music	Won
2017	31st Japan Gold Disc Award	Soundtrack Album of the Year	Won
2017	6th Newtype Anime Awards	Best Soundtrack	Runner-up

== See also ==
- Your Name (novel), a novelization of the film
