= Human Bloom =

Studio album by Radwimps
- Released: November 23, 2016
- Genre: Alternative rock; pop rock; melodic hardcore; emo pop
- Length: 70:48
- Language: Japanese
- Label: EMI; Universal

Radwimps chronology
Your Name (2016)	Human Bloom (2016)	Anti Anti Generation (2018)

Singles from Human Bloom
- 1. "記号として/‘I’ Novel" Released: November 25, 2015

Human Bloom (Japanese: 人間開花, Hepburn: Ningen Kaika) is the ninth studio album by Japanese rock band Radwimps. Released on November 23, 2016, by EMI Records, it topped the Oricon charts in Japan and was certified platinum by the RIAJ.

== Track listing ==
All tracks are written by Yojiro Noda.

No.	Title	Length
1.	"Lights go out"	2:58
2.	"Hikari" (光, "Light")	4:00
3.	"AADAAKOODAA"	3:05
4.	"Toaru Haru no Hi" (トアルハルノヒ, "One Spring Day")	5:37
5.	"Zenzenzense [original ver.]" (前前前世 [original ver.], "Many Previous Existences")	4:35
6.	"'I' Novel"	5:53
7.	"Ame no Hi ni Kiku" (アメノヒニキク, "Things Heard on Rainy Days")	5:38
8.	"Shuukan Shounen Janpu" (週刊少年ジャンプ, "Weekly Shonen Jump")	5:51
9.	"Bouningen" (棒人間, "Stick Figure")	4:43
10.	"Kigou toshite" (記号として, "As a Symbol")	5:13
11.	"Hitoboshi" (ヒトボシ, "Human Stars")	4:19
12.	"Supaakuru [original ver.]" (スパークル [original ver.], "Sparkle")	6:48
13.	"Bring me the morning"	0:54
14.	"O&O"	4:33
15.	"Kokuhaku" (告白, "Confession")	6:41
Total length:		70:48

== Personnel ==
Credits are adapted from the album's liner notes.

- Yojiro Noda - lyrics (all tracks), music (all tracks)
- Kazuki Yamaguchi - director
- Masayoshi Sugai - recording (all tracks), mixing (1–4, 6–14)
- Tom Lord-Alge - mixing (track 5)
- Chris Lord-Alge - mixing (track 15)
- Bob Ludwig - mastering (all tracks)
- Tetsuya Nagato - art director, designer
- Model - Serena Motola
- Jamil Kazmi - mix coordination (track 5, 15)

== Charts ==
Chart performance for Human Bloom
Chart (2016)	Peak position
Japan Albums (Oricon)	1
Japan Hot Albums (Billboard)	1
