= Forever Daze =

Studio album by Radwimps
- Released: November 23, 2021
- Genre: Alternative rock
- Length: 69:31
- Language: Japanese
- Label: EMI; Muzinto

Radwimps chronology
2+0+2+1+3+1+1= 10 Years 10 Songs (2021)	Forever Daze (2021)	The Last 10 Years: Original Soundtrack (2022)

Singles from Forever Daze
- 1. "Makafuka" Released: November 5, 2021

Forever Daze is the twelfth studio album by Japanese rock band Radwimps. It was released on November 23, 2021, by EMI Records and Muzinto Records.

== Track listing ==
No.	Title	Length
1.	"Kaiba" (海馬)	4:26
2.	"Shiwakucha" (featuring Awich)	4:05
3.	"Tokumeikibo" (匿名希望)	4:09
4.	"Twilight"	4:23
5.	"Togenkyo" (桃源郷)	4:03
6.	"Blame Summer" (夏のせい)	5:43
7.	"Makafuka"	5:31
8.	"Tokyo" (featuring iri)	3:22
9.	"Utakata-Uta" (うたかた歌) (featuring Masaki Suda)	6:06
10.	"Inujarashi" (犬じゃらし)	5:55
11.	"Grand Escape" (グランドエスケープ)	5:37
12.	"Kataware" (かたわれ)	3:59
13.	"Iron Feather" (鋼の羽根)	5:21
14.	"Summer Daze 2021"	6:51
Total length:		69:31

== Charts ==
Chart performance for Forever Daze
Chart (2021)	Peak position
Japan Albums (Oricon)	3
Japan Hot Albums (Billboard)	3
