= Space Shower Music Awards =

Japanese music award

Space Shower Music Video Awards
- Sponsored by: Space Shower TV
- Country: Japan
- First award: 1996–2022
- Website: awards.spaceshower.jp

Space Shower Music Awards (formerly Space Shower Music Video Awards) are an annual set of music awards sponsored by Japanese Space Shower TV. The prizes have been awarded since 1996.

== Winners in main categories ==
=== Best Video of the Year ===
Nr.	Year	Winning song	Artist	Director
1	1996	"Gattsudaze!!"	Ulfuls	Tetsurō Takeuchi
2	1997	"Shangri-La"	Denki Groove	Hiroyuki Itaya, Pierre Taki
3	1998	"Pink Spider"	hide with Spread Beaver	Shuichi Tan
4	1999	"Pieces"	L'Arc-en-Ciel	Masahiro Takada
5	2000	"Stay Away"	L'Arc-en-Ciel	Taku Ueda, Taku Tada
6	2002	"Traveling"	Hikaru Utada	Kazuaki Kiriya
7	2003	"Tokyo"	Keisuke Kuwata	Mitsuo Shindō
8	2004	"Kurumi" (くるみ)	Mr. Children	Kōki Tange
9	2005	"Galaxy"	Rip Slyme	Kōichirō Tsujikawa
10	2006	"Joy"	Yuki	Tsuyoshi Nakamura
11	2007	"Shirushi" (しるし)	Mr. Children	Kōki Tange
12	2008	"Hana no Na"	Bump of Chicken	Shuichi Bamba
13	2009	"Mononoke Dance" (モノノケダンス)	Denki Groove	Masakazu Amahisa
14	2010	"Fast Car"	Namie Amuro	Shigeaki Kubo
15	2011	"Aruku Around"	Sakanaction	Kazuaki Seki
16	2012	"Bach no Senritsu o Yoru ni Kiita Sei Desu"	Sakanaction	Yūsuke Tanaka
17	2013	"Tsukematsukeru"	Kyary Pamyu Pamyu	Jun Tamukai
18	2014	"Yoshū Fukushū"	Maximum the Hormone	Minami Kantō Gyakkyō-kai Neo (南関東逆境会Neo)
19	2015	Liberty & Gravity	Quruli	Jun Tamukai
20	2016	"Owaranai Uta" (終わらない歌)	Yuzu	Sojiro Kamatani
21	2017	"Koi"	Gen Hoshino	Kazuaki Seki
22	2018	"Non-fiction" (ノンフィクション)	Ken Hirai	Hidenobu Tanabe
23	2019	"Catharsist"	Radwimps	Kensaku Kakimoto
24	2020	"Aurora"	Bump of Chicken	kyotaro hayashi
25	2021	"Kanden"	Kenshi Yonezu	Yoshiyuki Okuyama
26	2022	"Fushigi" (不思議)	Gen Hoshino	Kyotaro Hayashi

=== Best Artist / Best Director ===
Nr.	Year	Best Artist	Best Director
1	1996		Shūichi Tan
2	1997		Eiki Takahashi
3	1998		Hideyuki Tanaka
4	1999		Hideaki Sunaga
5	2000		Suguru Takeuchi
6	2002		Kōki Tange
7	2003		not disclosed (according to the winner's wish)
8	2004		Ugichin
9	2005		Koichiro Tsujikawa
10	2006		Yasuyuki Yamaguchi
11	2007		Yūsuke Tanaka
12	2008		Yuichi Kodama
13	2009	Namie Amuro	Yuichi Kodama
14	2010	Ringo Sheena	Yuichi Kodama
15	2011	Kaela Kimura	Kazuaki Seki
16	2012	Tokyo Incidents	Yasuhiko Shimizu
17	2013	Sakanaction	Hidenobu Tanabe
18	2014	Yuzu	Jun Tamukai
19	2015	Sekai no Owari	Sojiro Kamatani
20	2016	Dreams Come True	Atsunori Toshi
21	2017	Radwimps	Hidenobu Tanabe
22	2018	Yuzu	Kento Yamada
23	2019	Gen Hoshino	Tomokazu Yamada
24	2020	One Ok Rock	Kyotaro Hayashi
25	2021	Official Hige Dandism	Takuto Shinbo
26	2022	YOASOBI	Spikey John

=== Best Your Choice ===
Nr.	Year	Winning song	Artist	Director
1	1996	"Gattsudaze!!" (ガッツだぜ!!)	Ulfuls	Tetsurō Takeuchi
2	1997	"Loop Slider" (ループスライダー)	Magokoro Brothers	Tarō Mitsuoka
3	1998	"Natsuiro" (夏色)	Yuzu	Yohito Teraoka
4	1999	"Sentimental" (センチメンタル)	Yuzu	Masaki Ōkita
5	2000	"Tobenai Tori" (飛べない鳥)	Yuzu	Eiki Takahashi
6	2002	"Pieces of a Dream"	Chemistry	Kōki Tange
7	2003	"Rakuen Baby" (楽園ベイベー)	Rip Slyme	Hiroshi Itō
8	2004	"Lost Man"	Bump of Chicken	Shūichi Banba, Harahitoshi Takano
9	2005	"Sharin no Uta"	Bump of Chicken	Shūichi Banba
10	2006	"Konayuki"	Remioromen	Shūichi Tan
11	2007	"Stand by Me"	Remioromen	Tomoo Noda
12	2008	"Hana no Na"	Bump of Chicken	Shūichi Banba
13	2009	"Order Made"	Radwimps	Yuichi Kodama
14	2010	"Oshakashama"	Radwimps	Yasunori Kakegawa, Tetsuya Nagato
15	2011	"Manifest" (マニフェスト)	Radwimps	Jika
16	2012	"Maximum the Hormone"	Maximum the Hormone	Yasuhiko Shimizu
17	2013	"The Beginning"	One Ok Rock	Maxilla
18	2014	"Niji o Matsu Hito" (虹を待つ人)	Bump of Chicken	Shūichi Banba
19	2015	"ray"	Bump of Chicken	Atsunori Toshi

People's Choice

Nr.	Year	Artist
20	2016	Bump of Chicken
21	2017	Alexandros
22	2018	Gen Hoshino
23	2019	Gen Hoshino
24	2020	Uverworld
25	2021	BTS
26	2022	Fujii Kaze

=== Album & Song of the Year ===
Nr.	Year	Album (artist)	Song (artist)
22	2018	The Gift (Hi-Standard)	Uchiage Hanabi (Daoko with Kenshi Yonezu)
23	2019	Pop Virus (Gen Hoshino)	Lemon (Kenshi Yonezu)
24	2020	9999 (The Yellow Monkey)	Pretender (Official Hige Dandism)
25	2021	Stray Sheep (Kenshi Yonezu)	"Yoru ni Kakeru" (Yoasobi)
26	2022	Editorial (Official Hige Dandism)	Dry Flower (Yuuri)

=== Other Awards for Artists ===
Year	Best Breakthrough Artist	Best Male Artist	Best Female Artist	Best Group Artist	Best International Artist	Best Respect Artist	Best Rock Artist
2016	Wanima	Gen Hoshino	Ringo Sheena	Sekai no Owari	Adele	Eikichi Yazawa	Alexandros
2017	Suchmos	Yu Takahashi	Hikaru Utada	Perfume	Bruno Mars	The Yellow Monkey	Radwimps
2018	Daoko	Kenshi Yonezu	Namie Amuro	One Ok Rock	Ed Sheeran	Elephant Kashimashi	Suchmos
2019	Nulbarich	Kenshi Yonezu	Hikaru Utada	Alexandros	Ariana Grande	Southern All Stars	Wanima
2020	SIRUP	Kenshi Yonezu	Aimyon	One Ok Rock	Billie Eilish	TSPO	King Gnu
2021	Fujii Kaze	Aimyon		Man with a Mission	BTS	Scha Dara Parr	King Gnu
2022	Hentai Shinshin Club	Fujii Kaze		millennium parade	BTS	Asian Kung-Fu Generation	Macaroni Enpitsu

=== Special Award ===
Nr.	Year	Artist
1	1996	Motoharu Sano, Takei Goodman
2	1997	Tatsuya Ishii, Bonnie Pink, Eastern Youth, Mitsuhiro Oikawa
3	1998	Southern All Stars, Hiroyuki Nakano & Tomoyasu Hotei, Blankey Jet City
6	2002	Cornelius, Daft Punk
8	2004	Thee Michelle Gun Elephant
9	2005	Glay
10	2006	Mr. Children, Kōki Tange
11	2007	M-Flo ♥ Minmi, Kumi Koda, The Birthday, By Phar the Dopest, Miki Furukawa
13	2009	Ukawanimation!, Maximum the Hormone
14	2010	Keisuke Kuwata
15	2011	Hikaru Utada
16	2012	Androp, Kyary Pamyu Pamyu
17	2013	Androp, Momoiro Clover Z (for "Saraba, Itoshiki Kanashimitachi yo")
18	2014	AKB48, Kyary Pamyu Pamyu
19	2015	Ken Hirai, OK Go
21	2017	Boom Boom Satellites

== Most wins overall ==
Updated till 2020.

Rank	1st	2nd	3rd	4th	5th	6th
Artist	Ringo Sheena (with Tokyo Jihen); RADWIMPS	Mr.Children; Gen Hoshino	Hikaru Utada	Denki Groove; Bump of Chicken	Ken Hirai; Namie Amuro; Kyary Pamyu Pamyu; Yuzu; ONE OK ROCK; Kenshi Yonezu	L'Arc-en-Ciel
Total awards	11	10	9	7	6	5
