= Weathering with You (album) =

Soundtrack album by Radwimps
- Released: July 19, 2019
- Genres: Pop rock; electronic; ambient; film score; chamber music
- Length: 66:49
- Language: Japanese
- Labels: EMI; Universal
- Producer: Radwimps

Radwimps chronology
| Anti Anti Generation (2018) | Weathering with You (2019) | 2+0+2+1+3+1+1= 10 Years 10 Songs (2021) |

Alternative cover
- Weathering with You -complete version-

Weathering with You (Japanese: 天気の子, Hepburn: Tenki no Ko; lit. 'Child of Weather') is the eleventh studio album by Japanese rock band Radwimps and the soundtrack for the 2019 Japanese animated film Weathering with You. It was released worldwide on July 19, 2019, the day of the movie's release by EMI Records and Universal.

== Background ==
On August 26, 2017, director Makoto Shinkai sent the script of the movie to vocalist Yojiro Noda for his opinions before he received the song "Is There Still Anything That Love Can Do?" from Radwimps, which is used as the film's theme song. Another song, "Grand Escape", features vocals from Tōko Miura. Other songs include "Voice of Wind", "Celebration" and "We'll Be Alright".

== Track listing ==
All music is composed by Yojiro Noda, except where indicated.

Weathering with You standard edition
| No. | Title | Lyrics | Music | Length |
|---|---|---|---|---|
| 1. | "Theme of "Weathering with You" (『天気の子』のテーマ, 『Tenki no Ko』no Tēma)" | | | 0:42 |
| 2. | "The Taste of Kindness (優しさの味, Yasashisa no Aji)" | | | 0:49 |
| 3. | "First Visit to K&A (K&A 初訪問, K&A Hatsu Hōmon)" | | | 1:50 |
| 4. | "Welcome to Senpikan (占秘館へようこそ, Uranai Hikan e Yōkoso)" | | Akira Kuwahara | 0:54 |
| 5. | "K&A Welcoming Ceremony (K&A 入社式, K&A Nyūsha Shiki)" | | | 1:03 |
| 6. | "Voice of Wind (風たちの声, Kaze Tachi no Koe)" (movie edit) | Yojiro Noda | Noda | 2:37 |
| 7. | "Saving Hina (陽菜、救出, Hina、Kyūshutsu)" | | | 1:48 |
| 8. | "Sky Clearing Up (晴れゆく空, Hare Yuku Sora)" | | | 2:14 |
| 9. | "Sea in the Sky (空の海, Sora no Umi)" | | | 1:00 |
| 10. | "Visiting Home (御宅訪問, Otaku Hōmon)" | | | 3:43 |
| 11. | "First Part Time Job as Sunshine Girl (初の晴れ女バイト, Hatsu no Hareonna Baito)" | | | 1:20 |
| 12. | "Celebration (祝祭, Shukusai)" (featuring Tōko Miura / movie edit) | Noda | Noda | 2:36 |
| 13. | "Fireworks Festival (花火大会, Hanabi Taikai)" | | | 3:05 |
| 14. | "Shrine of Weather (気象神社, Kishō Jinja)" | | Yusuke Takeda | 2:41 |
| 15. | "Shiba Kō-en (芝公園, Shiba Kō-en)" | | | 3:12 |
| 16. | "Two Confessions (二つの告白, Futatsu no Kokuhaku)" | | | 1:37 |
| 17. | "City Crisis (首都危機, Shuto Kiki)" | | | 1:37 |
| 18. | "Snow in Midsummer (真夏の雪, Manatsu no Yuki)" | | | 1:19 |
| 19. | "Power of the Weather (天気の力, Tenki no Chikara)" | | | 1:23 |
| 20. | "Time with Family (家族の時間, Kazoku no Jikan)" | | | 2:33 |
| 21. | "Hina, Fading Away (消えゆく陽菜, Kieyuku Hina)" | | | 1:08 |
| 22. | "Eternity Above Clouds (永遠の雲の上, Eien no Kumonōe)" | | | 0:52 |
| 23. | "Clear Sky and Loss (晴天と喪失, Seiten to Sōshitsu)" | | | 2:45 |
| 24. | "Hodaka Escapes / Kid's Plot (帆高、逃走〜子供達の画策, Hodaka、Tōsō〜Kodomotachi no Kakusaku)" | | | 3:02 |
| 25. | "Bike Chasing (バイクチェイス, Baiku Cheisu)" | | | 0:59 |
| 26. | "Running with Hina (陽菜と、走る帆高, Hina to、Hashiru Hodaka)" | | | 2:24 |
| 27. | "Is There Still Anything That Love Can Do? (愛にできることはまだあるかい, Ai ni Dekiru Koto wa Mada Aru Kai)" (movie edit) | Noda | Noda | 2:31 |
| 28. | "Grand Escape (グランドエスケープ, Gurando Esukēpu)" (featuring Tōko Miura / movie edit) | Noda | Noda | 3:08 |
| 29. | "Rain Again (ふたたびの、雨, Futatabi no、Ame)" | Noda | Noda | 0:45 |
| 30. | "We'll Be Alright (大丈夫, Daijōbu)" (movie edit) | Noda | Noda | 4:18 |
| 31. | "Is There Still Anything That Love Can Do? (愛にできることはまだあるかい, Ai ni Dekiru Koto wa Mada Aru Kai)" | Noda | Noda | 6:54 |
| Total length: | | | | 66:49 |

Weathering with You -complete version- standard edition
| No. | Title | Length |
|---|---|---|
| 1. | "Voice of Wind (風たちの声, Kaze Tachi no Koe)" | 4:13 |
| 2. | "Celebration (祝祭, Shukusai)" (featuring Tōko Miura) | 4:34 |
| 3. | "Grand Escape (グランドエスケープ, Gurando Esukēpu)" (featuring Tōko Miura) | 5:39 |
| 4. | "We'll Be Alright (大丈夫, Daijōbu)" | 5:35 |
| 5. | "Is There Still Anything That Love Can Do? (愛にできることはまだあるかい, Ai ni Dekiru Koto wa Mada Aru Kai)" | 6:54 |
| Total length: | | 26:55 |

Weathering with You -complete version- limited editions – disc 1
| No. | Title | Length |
|---|---|---|
| 6. | "Is There Still Anything That Love Can Do? (English version)" (international digital and limited CD edition only) | 6:45 |
| Total length: | | 33:46 |

Weathering with You -complete version- limited edition – disc 2
| No. | Title | Length |
|---|---|---|
| 1. | "Grand Escape (グランドエスケープ, Gurando Esukēpu)" (featuring Tōko Miura / music video) | 5:43 |
| 2. | "We'll Be Alright (大丈夫, Daijōbu)" (music video) | 5:38 |
| 3. | "Is There Still Anything That Love Can Do? (愛にできることはまだあるかい, Ai ni Dekiru Koto wa Mada Aru Kai)" (music video) | 7:32 |
| Total length: | | 52:39 |

== Charts ==
=== Weekly charts ===
| Chart (2019) | Peak positions | |
| Chart (2019) | Weathering with You | complete version |
|---|---|---|
| Japanese Albums (Oricon) | 2 | 2 |
| Japanese Hot Albums (Billboard) | 1 | 2 |

=== Year-end charts ===
| Chart (2019) | Position |
|---|---|
| Japanese Albums (Oricon) | 31 |
| Japanese Hot Albums (Billboard) | 12 |

=== Charted songs ===
| Title | Year | Peak chart positions | | |
| Title | Year | JPN Hot 100 | JPN Top DL | US World Digit |
|---|---|---|---|---|
| "Is There Still Anything That Love Can Do?" (愛にできることはまだあるかい) | 2019 | 3 | 1 | 14 |
| "Grand Escape" (featuring Toko Miura) (グランドエスケープ) | 2019 | 9 | 2 | 10 |

== Certifications and sales ==
| Region | Certification | Certified units/sales |
|---|---|---|
| Japan (RIAJ) | Gold | 100,000^{^} |
^{^} Shipments figures based on certification alone.

| Region | Sales | |
| Region | Weathering with You | complete version |
|---|---|---|
| Japan (Oricon) | 128,487 (CD) 51,265 (DL) | 35,090+ (CD) 17,596 (DL) |
| China | 153,162 (DL) | 241,345 (DL) |

== Accolades ==
| Year | Award | Category | Result |
|---|---|---|---|
| 2019 | 74th Mainichi Film Awards | Best Music | Won |
| 2020 | 34th Japan Gold Disc Award | Animation Album of the Year | Won |
| 2020 | 43rd Japan Academy Film Prize | Best Music | Won |
| 2020 | 24th Space Shower Music Awards | Best Soundtrack | Won |
