= Radwimps 3: Mujintō ni Motte Ikiwasureta Ichimai =

Studio album by Radwimps
- Released: February 15, 2006
- Recorded: 2005–2006
- Genre: Alternative rock; power pop; pop rock; emo
- Length: 49:56
- Language: Japanese, English
- Label: Toshiba EMI
- Producer: Junji Zenki (executive producer); Ryō Takagi

Radwimps chronology
Radwimps 2: Hatten Tojō (2005)	Radwimps 3: Mujintō ni Motte Ikiwasureta Ichimai (2006)	Radwimps 4: Okazu no Gohan (2006)

Singles from Radwimps 3
- 1. "Hexun" Released: May 25, 2005; 2. "Nijūgoko-me no Senshokutai" Released: November 23, 2005; 3. "EDP (Tonde Hi ni Iru Natsu no Kimi)" Released: January 18, 2006

Radwimps 3: Mujintō ni Motte Ikiwasureta Ichimai (無人島に持っていき忘れた一枚; "The CD I Forgot To Take To The Deserted Island"), stylised as RADWIMPS 3 ~Mujintō ni Motte Ikiwasureta Ichimai~, is Japanese rock band Radwimps' third album, and debut major label album under Toshiba EMI, released on February 15, 2006.

The album was an extremely long seller. It sold 13,800 copies in its first week and spent a single week in the top 40, however has spent 161 weeks charting in the top 300 since its release, and has been certified a platinum selling album by the RIAJ.

== Background and development ==
Radwimps 3 was recorded in three different recording sessions, with the first in Summer 2005. The band continued to record until September 2005, as the members still had high school to attend in October. Vocalist Yojiro Noda felt the separated recording sessions made the process much more fresh, and that he could put power into every song they recorded. This technique was different to what the band did for their first two albums, which were collections of recordings accumulated until the band had enough material for an album. Bassist Yusuke Takeda noted how their previous technique made album producing feel like work, and that it made the process dull. Radwimps 3 was finished being recorded in December 2005. Another new aspect in recording the band tried with Radwimps 3 was for all members to record simultaneously, as opposed to having each instrument recorded separately. The members believed such a technique helped the members understand the 'feeling' of the band.

Noda felt like the most important aspect of the album was lyrics.

The band's debut major label single, "Nijūgoko-me no Senshokutai," was an attempt by Noda to "express the world of music," and found it hard to fill the song with rhythm or space. The album-preceding single, "EDP (Tonde Hi ni Iru Natsu no Kimi)," was created with the concept of the band making an incomprehensible song. The acronym EDP has no particular meaning.

Of the songs on the album, six are sung completely in Japanese, two primarily in Japanese with English phrases, and four primarily in English with Japanese phrases.

== Promotion and release ==
The first single from the album was "Hexun" in May 2005, released while the band was still independent. The band made their major debut in November 2005 with the single "Nijūgoko-me no Senshokutai," followed by "EDP (Tonde Hi ni Iru Natsu no Kimi)" in January 2006, a month before the album's release.

After the album's release, the song "Otogi" received a music video, directed by Daisuke Shimada.

== Commercial reception ==
The album debuted at number 13 on Oricon's albums chart, falling out of the top 30 by the next week. However, the album consistently charted in the top 300 album chart for every week for the rest of 2006, until the end of September 2008. The album began regularly appearing on the album's chart again in January 2009, until the end of June 2009, after which it has sporadically recharted. In total, the album has spent 161 weeks on the top 300 albums chart as of March 2011. While the first weeks sales of the album only totalled 14,000, the current total has reached 189,000 copies. Furthermore, the album has been certified as a platinum album, having more than 250,000 copies shipped to stores across Japan.

The song "Saidai Kōyakusū" received a gold digital certification in March 2009, for the song being downloaded to cellphones more than 100,000 times since its release in February 2006.

== Track listing ==
All tracks are written by Yojiro Noda.

No.	Title	Length
1.	"4645" (Yoroshiko, "Best Regards")	2:42
2.	"September-san" (セプテンバーさん Seputenbā-san, "Mr. September")	5:07
3.	"EDP (Tonde Hi ni Iru Natsu no Kimi)" (イーディーピー～飛んで火にいる夏の君～ Ī Dī Pī, "Summer You in the Dancing Fire")	2:58
4.	"Tojita Hikari" (閉じた光 "Switched-off Light")	4:28
5.	"Nijūgoko-me no Senshokutai" (25コ目の染色体 "The 25th Chromosome")	5:16
6.	"Yayu" (揶揄 "Banter")	3:36
7.	"Hotaru" (螢 "Firefly")	4:18
8.	"Otogi" (おとぎ "Fairy Tale")	3:28
9.	"Saidai Kōyakusū" (最大公約数 "The Greatest Common Denominator")	4:34
10.	"Hexun" (へっくしゅん Hekkushun)	3:34
11.	"Tremolo" (トレモロ Toremoro)	3:20
12.	"Saigo no Uta" (最後の歌 "The Last Song")	6:26
Total length:		49:56

== Chart rankings ==
"Nijūgoko-me no Senshokutai"
Radwimps debut major label single, the mid-tempo "Nijūgoko-me no Senshokutai."

"EDP (Tonde Hi ni Iru Natsu no Kimi)"
Upbeat pop-punk song "EDP (Tonde Hi ni Iru Natsu no Kimi)" was released as the album's preceding single.

Chart	Peak position
Oricon daily albums	9
Oricon weekly albums	13

=== Sales and certifications ===
Chart	Amount
Oricon physical sales	189,000
RIAJ physical shipping certification	Platinum (250,000+)

== Release history ==
Region	Date	Format	Distributing Label
Japan	February 15, 2006	CD, digital download	Toshiba EMI
Japan	March 4, 2006	Rental CD	Toshiba EMI
South Korea	February 15, 2006	Digital download	Warner Music Korea
