= Radwimps 2: Hatten Tojō =

2005 studio album by Radwimps

RADWIMPS 2: Hatten Tojō

Studio album by Radwimps
- Released: March 8, 2005
- Recorded: 2004–2005
- Genre: Alternative rock; pop rock; indie rock; emo
- Length: 53:25
- Language: Japanese, English
- Label: Newtraxx

Radwimps chronology
| Radwimps (2003) | RADWIMPS 2: Hatten Tojō (2005) | Radwimps 3: Mujintō ni Motte Ikiwasureta Ichimai (2006) |

Singles from Radwimps 2
- 1. "Kiseki" Released: July 22, 2004; 2. "Kanashi" Released: May 25, 2005

Radwimps 2: Hatten Tojō (RADWIMPS 2 ～発展途上～; "Developing"), stylised as RADWIMPS 2 ~Hatten Tojō~, is Japanese rock band Radwimps' second album under independent label Newtraxx, released on March 8, 2005.

== Background and development ==
The album was the first to feature the band's current line-up, after their reformation in 2004. The band first recorded and released the single "Kiseki" in 2004. Two months after the album's release, the band released their final independent release, the double A-side "Hexun/Kanashi."

The album was created by recording song after song, until the band had enough material for an album. This technique was regretted by the band members, as it made album recording feel like work. The album was recorded with each member recording their instruments separately, a technique they no longer used in their next album. Immediately after the release of the album, vocalist and songwriter Yojiro Noda regretted the album's release, and wanted to make a new record as quickly as possible afterwards.

== Commercial reception ==
The album did not chart on Oricon's top 300 albums chart until May 2006. The album was a very gradual seller, charting for 106 weeks, and peaking at number 80. The album reached this peak in early 2007, and has only spent a single week in the top 100. Despite charting longer than the band's debut album and selling more units of it, it has not been officially recognised by the RIAJ as a gold certified album.

== Track listing ==
All tracks are written by Yojiro Noda.

| No. | Title | Length |
|---|---|---|
| 1. | "Ai kanashi (Akuru Ake)" (愛し ~明くる明け~ "Love is sad ~The Coming Dawn~") | 1:35 |
| 2. | "Nan chitte" (なんちって "What is it?") | 3:20 |
| 3. | "Sorya kimigasukidakara" (そりゃ君が好きだから "That's Because I Love You") | 3:18 |
| 4. | "Yumemitsuki ni Nani Omou" (夢見月に何想ふ "What do you think about the dreamy moon?") | 5:07 |
| 5. | "Notto Bikōzu" (ノットビコーズ Not Because) | 4:02 |
| 6. | "Ai ka nashi" (愛し "No Love") | 6:34 |
| 7. | "Wimpusu Gakuen Yasumi Jikan" (ういんぷす学園休み時間 "Wimps' Academy Free Period") | 0:58 |
| 8. | "Hikikomori Rollin'" (ヒキコモリロリン "Hikikomori Rollin'") | 4:46 |
| 9. | "Chakuseki" (着席 "Seated") | 0:09 |
| 10. | "Ore iro Sky" (俺色スカイ "My colored Sky") | 4:17 |
| 11. | "Oto no Ha" (音の葉 "Leaves of sound") | 4:04 |
| 12. | "Shirimetsuretsu" (シリメツレツ "Incoherent") | 3:22 |
| 13. | "Kiseki (In Album Version)" (祈跡 "Miracle") | 9:03 |
| 14. | "Lullaby" (ララバイ Rarabai) | 2:50 |
| Total length: | | 53:25 |

== Chart rankings ==
| Chart (2007) | Peak position |
|---|---|
| Oricon weekly albums | 80 |

=== Sales ===
| Chart | Amount |
|---|---|
| Oricon physical sales | 98,000 |

== Release history ==
| Region | Date | Format | Distributing Label |
|---|---|---|---|
| Japan | March 8, 2005 | CD | Newtraxx |
| Japan | March 26, 2005 | Rental CD | Newtraxx |
| South Korea | December 20, 2006 | Digital download | Warner Music Korea |
