= Order Made =

Single by Radwimps

from the album Altocolony no Teiri
- Released: January 23, 2008
- Recorded: 2007
- Genre: Alternative rock
- Length: 5:53
- Label: EMI Music Japan
- Songwriter: Yojiro Noda
- Producers: Junji Zenki (executive producer); Ryō Takagi

Radwimps singles chronology
"Setsuna Rensa" (2006)	"Order Made" (2008)	"Manifesto" (2010)

"Order Made" (オーダーメイド, Ōdā Meido; "Tailor Made") is a song by Japanese rock band Radwimps, released on January 23, 2008, as the leading single a year before the band's sixth album, Altocolony no Teiri. The song was a commercial success, debuting at number one on Oricon's single charts, and at the time, becoming the band's most commercially successful song. The music video received several accolades from the MTV Video Music Awards and Space Shower Music Video Awards, including the best rock video award from each event.

== Composition and writing ==
The song is a mid-tempo rock ballad, mostly based around an arrangement of guitars and slowly performed drums. As the song progresses, background synths, drums and guitars build up in intensity, with more layers added for each verse. A minute before the song ends, the arrangement becomes a much more frantic rock arrangement. The final section refrains the original arrangement.

The lyrics detail someone musing over the idea that before they were born, they were given specific choices. Someone asked them if they would like to see the future or past, and he figures he picked the past, so that he could be a kind person, rather than a strong person, and to understand what memories truly mean. The person then asked him about his body, and planned to give him two arms, legs, mouths, ears, eyes, hearts, breasts and nostrils. He asked for just a single mouth, so that he couldn't argue with himself and could kiss only one person. The maker looks disappointed at this, then asked if a heart for each side of his chest would be good. He replied that he did not want a heart on his right side. The narrator believes that the first time he holds someone special against himself, he will feel the beating of his two hearts, so that apart the two people will lack something, and that people cannot live by themselves. The maker then gave one final choice, whether to have tears or not, pointing out that not having tears is not a big hindrance for many people. The narrator replied that he wants them, so that he can become a kind person and understand what is important to him. The maker asked what flavor, sour, salty, spicy or sweet, would he like his tears to be. The narrator asks the maker to have his face, just after he has finished crying, be shown to him with pride. The narrator finally asks the maker whether they have met before, because throughout the song (in the chorus), the narrator laments of a nostalgic feeling growing in his chest, and of memories and feelings he wants to forget but cannot.

The song was the first created for the Altocolony no Teiri album sessions. Songwriter and vocalist Yojiro Noda felt the song was extremely important, and that it reaffirmed his ability to write good lyrics.

== Music video ==
Above: the child in red as he sits in the kitchen. Below: the white outside of the kitchen, as well as Radwimps band members.

The music video was directed by Yuichi Kodama, and was shot on December 16, 2007. The video begins in a kitchen, showing on a mechanical display digital clock. It then focuses on a young child wearing a red shirt, who sits at the kitchen table. The child looks left, to a child in blue next to the kitchen bench. The blue child offers him a choice between two types of white bread. He chooses the sliced loaf. The red child looks to his right, which causes the camera perspective to change and shows the kitchen existing as a cube in a white area. Vocalist Yojiro Noda stands outside this area, levitating and spinning a piece of white bread above his finger. Other band members move in slow motion as a 3D graphic of sliced white bread falls apart.

The video then shows the blue child chopping various items. He offers the red child a slice of tomato, however the child now appears as a young man in his 20s. The red man has his age change again, and appears in his 40s. He looks at the television behind himself, which broadcasts a video of his 20-year-old self. The video changes to a clip of a young woman (played by model Nozomi Takagi), and as the camera pans out, the red man is now in his 60s. The child in blue continues to make the sandwich, showing and offering different ingredients to the person in red. The woman from the television sits at the opposite side of the table, and the man turns back into his 20s. The length of the table grows shorter, and two 3D animated three-block hearts appear in front of each person. These two hearts lock into each other above the table, the man grows older. A room with only the red man's heart in turns dark, and then the heart falls down. Interspersed with these scenes is footage of the band in the white area outside of the room, where a sandwich levitates and rotates in its layers, and the band moving together in a synchronized dance.

The child in blue finishes the sandwich with salad dressing, and makes the red man choose one of six condiments. The clock behind the pair strikes 12:00, and the video then switches to the band performing the song, along with clips of the woman from before, along with nostalgically shot home video-style footage of flowers, trees, waterways and a car trip. The final scene involves the red man, now a child again, being offered his completed sandwich by the blue child. He closes his eyes as he takes a bite and everything fades to black.

The video won the MTV Video Music Awards Japan 2008 award for Best Rock Video. At the 2009 Space Shower Music Video Awards, the video won the same accolade, as well as the Best Your Choice Award, a popular vote award by viewers.

== Critical reception ==
The leading single "Order Made" was described as "very unique" by CDJournal, describing it as having a British folk-like sound. Takashi Ōno of What's In? noted the song's Mother Goose-like story telling qualities, and praised the "clear feelings" and tender vocals against the occasionally aggressive performance. Isamu Onoda called Noda's lyric writing in the song genius-like, and praised the tension of the building up arrangement. When listening to the single, he felt it was "the birth of a signature song."

Shirō Ise of listen.jp also felt "Order Made" was a definite signature song for the band. He praised the song for its "magnificent and radical rock tune" and "politely storytelling vocals," and felt that the guitar arpeggio made the song extremely dignified-sounding, further praising the irregular sound to the drum/bass arrangement. He noted the song's development, saying that he felt listeners should feel a deep catharsis when listening to it.

== Track listing ==
All tracks are written by Yojiro Noda.

No.	Title	Length
1.	"Order Made"	5:53
2.	"Gū no Ne" (グーの音 "The Sound 'Goo'")	2:49
Total length:		8:50

== Chart rankings ==
"Order Made"
A sample from "Order Made."

Chart	Peak position
Billboard Japan Hot 100	3
Oricon weekly singles	1
Oricon yearly singles	59
RIAJ Reco-kyō ringtones Top 100	42

=== Sales and certifications ===
Chart	Amount
Oricon physical sales	116,000
RIAJ physical shipping certification	Gold (100,000+)
RIAJ full-length cellphone downloads	Gold (100,000+)
