= Radwimps (album) =

Studio album by Radwimps
- Released: July 2, 2003
- Recorded: 2001–2003
- Genre: Alternative rock; pop rock; indie rock; emo
- Length: 63:23
- Language: Japanese, English
- Label: Newtraxx

Radwimps chronology
Radwimps (2003)	Radwimps 2: Hatten Tojō (2005)

Singles from Radwimps
- 1. "Moshi mo" Released: May 3, 2003

Radwimps (stylized as RADWIMPS) is Japanese rock band Radwimps' debut album under independent label Newtraxx, released on July 2, 2003.

== Background and development ==
The band first created a different album also called Radwimps in June 2002, selling copies at live concerts for 500 yen. It featured the songs "Aoi Haru", "Iyan", "Shinzō", "Moshi mo" and "Aimai", which were all included on their debut album.

The album was preceded by the single "Moshi mo," which was the song that lead the band to win the Yokohama High School Music Festival in 2002. 10,000 copies were pressed and sold for 100 yen each. Following this single, the band toured the Yokohama area, including a performance as the sole act at Yokohama's Club 24West. The band released Radwimps in July through independent label Newtraxx, featuring songs written by the band in middle school.

In August 2003, the band went on hiatus. This was so vocalist Yojiro Noda and other band members could focus on their school exams. When the band returned in 2004, members Yūsuke Saiki, Kei Asō and Akio Shibafuji were no longer a part of the group, making this album the only with Radwimps' original line-up.

== Commercial reception ==
The album did not chart on Oricon's top 300 albums chart until August 2006. The album was a very gradual seller, charting for 98 weeks and peaking at number 86. The album reached this peak in early 2007 and has only spent a single week in the top 100. In March 2008, the album was certified gold by the RIAJ.

== Track listing ==
All tracks are written by Yojiro Noda.

No.	Title	Length
1.	"Jinsei Deai" (人生出会い "Human Meeting")	5:42
2.	"Jibōjiki Jikochūshin-teki (Shishunki) Jiko Izonshō no Shōnen" (自暴自棄自己中心的 (思春期)自己依存症の少年 "Desperate Egotistic (Teenage) Self-Addicted Boy")	4:37
3.	"Shinzō" (心臓 "Heart")	6:18
4.	"Moshi mo ("Minna Isshō ni" version)" (もしも「みんな一緒に」バージョン "If (Everyone Together Version)")	5:38
5.	"Samishii Boku" (さみしい僕 "Sad Me")	4:21
6.	"Condom" (コンドーム Kondōmu)	4:54
7.	"Aoi Haru" (青い春 "Blue Spring")	4:07
8.	""Boku" to "Boku"" (「ぼく」と「僕」 "'ME' and 'me'")	2:56
9.	"Aimai" (あいまい "Vague")	2:59
10.	"Iyan" (嫌ん "Bad")	5:57
11.	""Zutto Daisuki dayo" "Honto?..."" (「ずっと大好きだよ」「ほんと?・・・」 "'I'll Always Love You' 'Really?'")	6:43
12.	"Ai e" (愛へ "To Love")	5:00
13.	"I Love You" (あいラブユー Ai Rabu Yū)	3:02
Total length:		63:23

== Chart rankings ==
Chart (2007)	Peak position
Oricon weekly albums	86

=== Sales and certifications ===
Chart	Amount
Oricon physical sales	91,000
RIAJ physical shipping certification	Gold (100,000+)

== Release history ==
Region	Date	Format	Distributing Label
Japan	July 2, 2003	CD	Newtraxx
Japan	November 2, 2006	Rental CD	Newtraxx
