= Zenzenzense =

Single by Radwimps

from the album Your Name
- Released: July 25, 2016
- Recorded: 2016
- Genre: Alternative rock; power pop; pop-punk
- Length: 4:44 (Movie Version); 4:35 (original version, English version)
- Label: EMI
- Songwriter: Yojiro Noda
- Producer: Radwimps

"Zenzenzense" (Japanese: 前前前世; "Past-Past-Past Life") is a rock song by Japanese band Radwimps, released in 2016. It was used as one of the four theme songs to the animated film from the same year, Your Name, and was one of 26 pieces the band composed for the film's soundtrack. It reached number one on the Billboard Japan Hot 100. It also received a digital download song certification of Million from the Recording Industry Association of Japan for sales of 1,000,000.

== Background ==
In late 2014, Makoto Shinkai sent Yojiro Noda, Radwimps' frontman, a rough draft of the film's scenario. Within a few months, Radwimps submitted a demo of the track alongside "Sparkle". In the context of the film, the song is played during a fast-paced montage in which main characters Taki and Mitsuha swap bodies.

== Release ==
The song was originally released as a promotional single for the Your Name soundtrack on July 25, 2016, ahead of the soundtrack's late August release. The original version of the song, which has slight structural changes, was included on the band's eighth studio album Ningen Kaika (along with another of the four vocal compositions from the Your Name soundtrack, "Sparkle"). The song was also used in multiple trailers for Your Name prior to the film's release.

On August 19, 2016, the song's official video premiered on TV Asahi's Music Station. Shortly afterwards, the video was uploaded onto YouTube. Ahead of the film's April 2017 release in North America, Radwimps re-recorded the four vocal theme songs from the film in English, including "Zenzenzense". The English version was unveiled on Tokyo FM's School of Lock! radio program on January 23, 2017, with a digital release following on January 27.

== Credits and personnel ==
Adapted from Your Name liner notes.

- Yojiro Noda – composer, lyricist, arranger, producer, vocals, guitar, piano
- Akira Kuwahara – producer, guitar
- Yusuke Takeda – producer, bass
- Mizuki Mori – drums support
- Masayoshi Sugai – recording engineer, mixing engineer
- Tom Lord-Alge – mixing engineer
- Bob Ludwig – mastering engineer
- Tetsuro Sawamoto – assistant engineer
- Jamil Kazmi – mix coordination

== Charts ==
=== Weekly charts ===
Chart (2016–2017)	Peak position
Japan Hot 100 (Billboard Japan)	1
Japan Hot 100 (Billboard Japan): English version	20
Japan Hot Animation (Billboard Japan)	1
Japan Radio Songs (Billboard Japan)	1
South Korea (Gaon Music Chart)	92
World Digital Song Sales (Billboard)	9

=== Yearly charts ===
Chart (2016)	Peak position
Japan Hot 100 (Billboard Japan)	2
Japan Hot Animation (Billboard Japan)	1
Japan Radio Songs (Billboard Japan)	1

=== All-time charts ===
Chart (2008–2022)	Position
Japan (Japan Hot 100)	25

== Certifications and sales ==
Region	Certification	Certified units/sales
Japan (RIAJ) Digital single (movie version)	Million	1,000,000^{*}
Japan (RIAJ) Digital single (original version)	Gold	100,000^{*}
South Korea (Gaon)	N/A	205,497
Streaming
Japan (RIAJ) Movie version	Gold	50,000,000^{†}
Japan (RIAJ) Original version	Platinum	100,000,000^{†}
^{*} Sales figures based on certification alone.^{†} Streaming-only figures based on certification alone.

== Release history ==
Region	Date	Format	Distributing Label
Japan	July 5, 2016	radio debut	EMI Records
Japan	July 25, 2016	digital download	EMI Records
