= Altocolony no Teiri =

Studio album by Radwimps
- Released: March 11, 2009
- Recorded: 2007–2009
- Genres: Alternative rock; pop rock; melodic hardcore; midwest emo; math pop
- Length: 59:04
- Languages: Japanese, English
- Label: EMI Music Japan
- Producers: Junji Zenki (executive producer); Ryō Takagi

Radwimps chronology
Radwimps 4: Okazu no Gohan (2006)	Altocolony no Teiri (2009)	Zettai Zetsumei (2011)

Singles from Altocolony no Teiri
- 1. "Order Made" Released: January 23, 2008; 2. "Oshakashama" Released: January 21, 2009 (digital download); 3. "Amaotoko" Released: January 21, 2009 (digital download); 4. "Tayuta" Released: February 11, 2009 (digital download)

Altocolony no Teiri (アルトコロニーの定理, Arutokoronī no Teiri; "The Altocolony Theorem") is Japanese rock band Radwimps' fifth album, released on March 11, 2009. It was preceded by the single "Order Made" in 2008, which became the band's first number one single. The album was a critical and commercial success, with critics noting the successful experimental growth in the band's sound. The album was certified platinum by the Recording Industry Association of Japan, and as of 2011 is tied for their most commercially successful work with the band's previous album, Radwimps 4: Okazu no Gohan.

== Background and development ==
Altocolony no Teiri was recorded over a period of three years, with recording beginning after the band's post-Radwimps 4 tour, Tour 2007 "Harumaki". Recording was a gradual process, where the band recorded music without thinking of a specific release date. The concept of the album came into fruition in May 2008, and much of the substance of the album was recorded in October. The original plan was to release an album by the end of 2008, however this was not achieved. Noda later apologized for the late release.

"Order Made" was the first song completed for the album, and was released as a single in January 2008. Songwriter and vocalist Yojiro Noda felt the song was extremely important, and that it reaffirmed his ability to write good lyrics. "Nazonazo" was recorded on three days, between December 23 and December 25, 2008. "Sakebe" was made during the final stages of the album in 2009. The songs on the album were created in a different way to previous compositions. Previously, Noda would write songs in a single moment, however in this album, he had a lot of time to consider everything. Every sound on the record was considered as to why it was there.

The title of the album is the first to break from the title style of previous Radwimps albums, featuring Radwimps followed by an ordinal number, and followed by a subtitle. This change was intended to show how the mood of the band had changed between this album and Radwimps 4. The title of the album, Altocolony no Teiri, started with the word teiri (定理; theorem), which Noda interprets as a key to a problem, as a theorem is in mathematics a statement that is true based on previous mathematical proofs. After listening to the completed album, Noda felt like the album was a theorem explaining himself, that it was a solution to all of his worries and the puzzles before him when he wrote the songs. For Altocolony, alto refers to the singing range, as many of the songs are sung in this range. Noda chose alto to be a part of the album's title to express his happiness at being about to create music with different singing registers. Colony refers to biological aggregations, as Noda felt like the album had an aggregated atmosphere.

"Märchen to Gretel" is a response to the lyrics of the band's 2006 single, "Futarigoto," in which Noda writes how someday he'll write a song about if he and his lover "write the character for 'you' but pronounce it 'love,'" and "write the character 'me' but pronounce it 'love'" that they will never break apart. The song also refrains the above lines. Noda was unsure why he made such a promise at the time of writing "Futarigoto." "Nanoka" features a chorus of 16 voices repeating the chorus, however all recorded vocals in the song are Noda's. The choir effect was created by Noda standing in different positions in the recording studio relative to the microphone, as well as by changing the style and adopting a different persona for each vocal take. "Magic Mirror" was chosen to be the 11th track due to the character 1 repeated twice in 11 being similar to a mirror.

Of the songs on the album, eight are sung completely in Japanese, two in English, and three predominantly in Japanese with English sections.

== Promotion and release ==
The album was preceded by the single "Order Made" by a whole year, which became their most commercially successful song to date and first number one single. The band performed four major lives in 2008, one at summer festival Setstock in July, one a special one-date live performance called Radwimps Live 2008: Order Made Live (RADWIMPS LIVE 2008 オーダーメイドライブ) at Okinawa's Namura Hall on July 31, and two dates in the Summer Sonic Festival in mid August.

On January 7, 2009, the band released "Oshakashama" and "Amaotoko" as ringtone downloads, followed by a full-length download to cellphones release on January 21. The track "Tayuta" was released on ringtone and as a digital download to cellphones a month later, on February 11.

Three music videos were produced for album tracks, other than the Yuichi Kodama-directed video for the preceding single, "Order Made". The three videos were directed by Yasunori Kakegawa, and were for "Oshakashama," "Sakebe" and "Tayuta." Graphic designer Tetsuya Nagato, who had also designed the album's cover, additionally worked on directing "Oshakashama." The videos were recorded between mid-January 2008 and the end of January. Originally during album promotions, only the videos for "Oshakashama" and "Tayuta" were aired, with the video for "Sakebe" first airing on April 6, the first day of the band's tour for the album.

The band toured live houses in Japan between April and June 2009, on their Radwimps "Irutocolony Tour 09" (RADWIMPS "ｲﾙﾄｺﾛﾆｰTOUR 09", Raddo'upinpusu Irutokoronī Tsuā), performing 31 dates.

An official music score for the album, titled Altobenrii no Heiki (アルトベンリーの兵器, Arutobenrī no Heiki; "Altohandy Weapons") was released on September 29, 2009.

== Critical reception ==
Professional ratings
Review scores
Source	Rating
Allmusic	4/5 stars
CDJournal	favorable
Hot Express	favorable
Rockin' On	favorable
Vibe	favorable
What's In?	favorable

The album was received extremely well by critics, with Hiroki Yokuyama from Rockin' On even calling the album a "masterpiece." Many critics noted the experimental nature of the album, and the increase of the band's breadth of musical sound. Critics were impressed with the careful arrangements of the songs, including fast rap-style vocals, the rustic blues sound that develops into a gospel-like choir sound in "Nanoka," and the band's first experimentation with electronic beats in "Nazonazo". Alexey Eremenko of Allmusic noted that the wide range of influences were held together by "melodic, predominantly clean guitar textures, the high but perfectly controlled voice of Yojiro Noda, and the overall mood of the songs." Vibe's Sōta Hori noted the band's style had changed compared to their previous albums, however felt that all the songs still felt like true Radwimps songs, and that the growth process felt natural. Hori also noted the scattered nature of the album's styles. Takahiro Ōyama of What's In? felt similarly, noting how Radwimps already had a distinct sound, but Altocolony no Teiri built on this sound further.

The leading single "Order Made" was described as "very unique" by CDJournal, describing it as having a British folk-like sound. Takashi Ōno of What's In? noted the song's Mother Goose-like story telling qualities, and praised the "clear feelings" and tender vocals against the occasionally aggressive performance.

Noda's lyrics were often a high-point of reviews. Jun Yamamoto of Hot Express felt they were sharp, and had a dangerous sensitivity, while Rockin' On's Hiroki Yokuyama praised how skilfully Noda's lyrics can draw in the listener to the experience. Hori felt the lyrics would make a warm impression on listeners. Ōyama felt Noda's world-view presented in his lyrics had evolved for this album.

The album, especially the songs "Order Made" and "Oshakashama" won several awards. The music video for "Order Made" won the MTV Video Music Awards Japan 2008 Best Rock Video award, along with the Best Your Choice Award and Best Rock Video award at the 2009 Space Shower Music Video Awards "Oshakashama" won the FM Festival "Life Music Award 2009"'s Best Lyric of Life award, and its music video won the Space Shower Music Video Awards 2010 Best Your Choice Award. The video was also nominated at the MTV World Stage VMAJ 2010 for Best Rock Video, but was unsuccessful. The album was chosen as the best album of the year at the FM Festival "Life Music Award 2009," and was nominated for the best album of the year by CD store workers at The Second CD Shop Awards.

== Chart reception ==
The album debuted at number two on Oricon's weekly albums charts, underneath Remioromen's greatest hits album Remio Best. The album sold 213,000 copies in its first week, beaten by Remio Best by 68,000 copies to the top position. The release of the album caused many Radwimps albums to re-chart. The week before the album's release, only Radwimps 3 and Radwimps 4 were charting in positions in the low 200, whereas during the week of release, Radwimps 4 charted at number 84, and Radwimps 3 at number 130, selling respectively three times and twice as many copies as the previous week. Also during the week of release, Radwimps and Radwimps 2 re-charted, ranking in at number 180 and number 195. In 2009, Altocolony no Teiri was the 19th most sold album of the year, and the 9th most sold album by a rock artist.

After the release of the album, "Oshakashama" proved to be a hit digitally, in July 2009 being certified gold for 100,000 paid full-length downloads to cellphones.

== Track listing ==
All tracks are written by Yojiro Noda.

No.	Title	Length
1.	"Tayuta" (タユタ)	3:03
2.	"Oshakashama" (おしゃかしゃま)	3:46
3.	"Bagpipe" (バグパイプ Bagupaipu)	2:43
4.	"Nazonazo" (謎謎 "Riddle")	5:44
5.	"Nanoka" (七ノ歌 "Seven Song")	6:28
6.	"One Man Live"	4:40
7.	"Socratic Love" (ソクラティックラブ Sokuratikku Rabu)	3:49
8.	"Märchen to Gretel" (メルヘンとグレーテル Meruhen to Gurēteru, "Fairy Tales and Gretel")	4:45
9.	"Amaotoko" (雨音子 "Rain Sound Boy")	3:48
10.	"Order Made" (オーダーメイド Ōdā Meido)	5:53
11.	"Magic Mirror" (魔法鏡 Majikku Mirā)	3:16
12.	"Sakebe" (叫べ "Scream!")	4:51
13.	"37458" (Minashigohacchi, "The Orphan Hutch")	6:18
Total length:		59:04

== Chart rankings ==
"Order Made"
Mid-tempo single "Order Made" preceded the album by a year, and became the band's first number one single.

"Oshakashama"
A sample from the most successful of the album release promotional tracks, "Oshakashama."

"Nanoka"
Critics praised the folk/gospel choir influences in "Nanoka"

Chart (2009)	Peak position
Oricon weekly albums	2
Oricon yearly albums	19

=== Sales and certifications ===
Chart	Amount
Oricon physical sales	343,000
RIAJ physical shipping certification	Platinum (250,000+)

== Personnel ==
- Tomonobu Akiba - assistant engineer [Studio Terra]
- Naoki Iwata - assistant engineer [Alive Recording Studio]
- Yasunori Kakegawa - visual coordination
- Kimiko Katō - sales promoter
- Kenichi Koga - assistant engineer [Aobadai Studio]
- Takashi "Koti" Kotani - equipment & sound coordination
- Mitsuo Kusano - tour and promotion chief
- Akira Kuwahara - guitar
- Yasuji Maeda - mastering engineer [Bernie Grundman Mastering]
- Tetsuya Nagato - art direction, artwork, graphic design
- Kenichi Nakamura - recording and mixing engineer [Groove One]
- Yumiko Nishizaki - promoter
- Yojiro Noda - guitar, songwriting, vocals
- Radwimps - arrangement
- Shun Saitoh - assistant engineer [Studio Terra]
- Tetsurou Sawamoto - assistant engineer [Studio Terra]
- Ryō Takagi - producer
- Kōji Takayama - visual coordination
- Tōru Takayama - recording and mixing engineer [Switchback]
- Yusuke Takeda - bass
- Shinichi Takizawa - assistant engineer [Alive Recording Studio]
- Satoshi Tsukahara - management
- Masatoshi Watanabe - promoter
- Kazuki Yamaguchi - director
- Satoshi Yamaguchi - drums
- Kazushi Yamamoto - assistant engineer [Alive Recording Studio]
- Junji Zenki - executive producer

== Release history ==
Region	Date	Format	Distributing Label
Japan	March 11, 2009	CD, digital download	EMI Music Japan
Japan	March 28, 2009	Rental CD	EMI Music Japan
