= 58th Japan Record Awards =

2016 Japanese music awards ceremony

- Date: December 30, 2016
- Venue: New National Theater, Tokyo
- Country: Japan
- Hosted by: Shin'ichirō Azumi, Yūki Amami
- Website: http://www.tbs.co.jp/recordaward/

Television/radio coverage
- Network: TBS

The 58th Japan Record Awards (第58回日本レコード大賞) took place at the New National Theater in Tokyo on December 30, 2016. The ceremony was televised in Japan on TBS.

== Presenters ==
- Yūki Amami
- Shin'ichirō Azumi (TBS announcer)

== Winners and winning works ==
=== Grand Prix ===
- Kana Nishino — "Anata no Suki na Tokoro"

=== Best Singer Award ===
- Masayuki Suzuki – "Melancholia"

=== Best New Artist Award ===
- iKon

=== Excellent Work Award ===
- Kana Nishino — "Anata no Suki na Tokoro"
- Urashima Tarō (Kenta Kiritani) — "Umi no Koe"
- Fuyumi Sakamoto — "Onna wa daka rete ayu ni naru"
- Kyary Pamyu Pamyu — "Sai & Co"
- AKB48 – "365 nichi no kamihikouki"
- AAA – "Namida no nai Sekai"
- Hikaru Utada – "Fantôme"
- Mariya Nishiuchi — "Believe"
- Kiyoshi Hikawa — "Miren Gokoro"
- Ikimono-gakari – "Last Scene"

=== New Artist Award ===
- iKon
- Satoshi Hayashibe
- Mizuki Hayama
- Boys and Men

=== Best Album Award ===
- Hikaru Utada – "Fantôme"

=== Excellence Album Award ===
- Gen Hoshino – "Yellow Dancer"
- Spitz – "Samenai"
- Back Number – "Chandelier"
- Taro Hakase – "Joy of Life"

=== Good Planning Award ===
- V.A. – "Akaran Kun"
- Ikusaburo Yamazaki – "1936 〜your songs〜"
- Ryuun Nagai – "Kaerimite"
- V.A. – "THE PEANUTS -TRIBUTE SONGS-"
- Begin – "Sugar Cane Cable Network"
- Juju – "Snack JUJU ~Yoru no Request~ (Roppongishinjū, Love is Over)"
- Mitsuko Nakamura – "Chōhen kayō rōkyoku muhō matsu no koi 〜 Matsugorō to Yoshioka fujin 〜"
- Izumi Yukimura&Hibari Misora&Chiemi Eri – "Too Young"
- Ranka – "Tokyo Koibumi"
- RADIO FISH – "PERFECT HUMAN"
- Miki Matsukawa – "Miki no uta no tabi..."

=== Special Award ===
- Radwimps (Movie"Your Name.")
- The Yellow Monkey
- Shirō Sagisu, Akira Ifukube (Movie"Shin Godzilla")
- Big Bang

=== Special Topic Award ===
- Pikotaro – "PPAP (Pen-Pineapple-Apple-Pen)"

=== Special Honor Award ===
- Toru Funamura (The fourth chairman of Japan Composer's Association)

=== Achievement Award ===
- Isao Saito
- Daisuke Shiga
- Kiyoko Suizenji
- Masao Sen
- Shunichi Makaino

=== Special Achievement Award ===
- Yûmi Ito (singer of "The Peanuts")
- Rokusuke Ei (Screenwriter, Lyricist)
- Kisōtetsu (Member of "Dark Ducks")
- Sasaki Kō (Member of "Dark Ducks")
- Isao Tomita (Composer, Synthesizer player)

=== Encouragement Award by Japan Composer's Association ===
- Sanae Jōnouchi
- Yutaka Yamakawa

=== Best Composer Award ===
- Chiaki Oka – "Inochi no koi" (Original Artist:Mika Shinno)

=== Best Songwriter Award ===
- Fumihiko Hara – "Aki Koiuta" (Original Artist:Kaori Kozai)

=== Best Arranger Award ===
- Sekai no Owari – "Hey Ho" (Original Artist:Sekai no Owari)
