= Batsu to Maru to Tsumi to =

Studio album by Radwimps
- Released: December 11, 2013
- Genre: Alternative rock; math rock; melodic hardcore; pop rock; rap rock
- Length: 76:50
- Language: Japanese
- Label: EMI Japan

Radwimps chronology
Zettai Zetsumei (2011)	Batsu to Maru to Tsumi to (2013)	Your Name (2016)

Singles from Batsu to Maru to Tsumi to
- 1. "Dreamer's High" Released: 27 March 2013; 2. "Gogatsu no Hae/Last Virgin" Released: 16 October 2013

Batsu to Maru to Tsumi to (×と○と罪と; "Wrong and Right and Crimes and") is the seventh studio album by Japanese rock band Radwimps. It was released on December 11, 2013, by EMI Records Japan. The album reached #2 rank first week in Oricon rankings. It charted for 29 weeks. The album was certified platinum by the Recording Industry Association of Japan.

== Track listing ==
All tracks are written by Yojiro Noda.

No.	Title	Length
1.	"Ienai" (いえない "Unspeakable")	6:32
2.	"Jikkyou Chukei" (実況中継 "Live Coverage")	5:05
3.	"Iron Bible" (アイアンバイブル Aian Baiburu)	5:35
4.	"Reunion" (リユニオン Riyunian)	5:19
5.	"Darma Grand Prix"	4:09
6.	"Gogatsu no Hae" (五月の蝿 "Fly in May")	5:03
7.	"Saigo no Bansan" (最後の晩餐 "The Last Supper")	5:10
8.	"Yugiri" (夕霧 "Evening Mist")	1:40
9.	"Breath" (ブレス Buresu)	6:22
10.	"Perfect Baby" (パーフェクトベイビー Pāfekuto beibi)	3:56
11.	"Dreamer's High" (ドリーマーズ・ハイ Dorimaruzu Hai)	5:57
12.	"Kaishin no Ichigeki" (会心の一撃 "Critical Hit")	4:36
13.	"Tummy"	4:47
14.	"Last Virgin" (ラストバージン Rasuto Bājin)	5:13
15.	"Hari to Toge" (針と棘 "Thorns and Needles")	7:20
Total length:		1:16:50
