= Suzume (album) =

2022 soundtrack album by Radwimps and Kazuma Jinnouchi

Soundtrack album by Radwimps and Kazuma Jinnouchi
- Released: November 11, 2022
- Genres: Anison; film score; J-pop; rock; film score; chamber music; ambient
- Length: 81:47
- Language: Japanese
- Labels: EMI; Muzinto

Radwimps chronology
The Last 10 Years: Original Soundtrack (2022)	Suzume (2022)	Anew (2025)

Kazuma Jinnouchi chronology
RWBY: Ice Queendom Original Soundtrack (2022)	Suzume (2022)

Singles from Suzume
- 1. "Suzume" Released: September 30, 2022; 2. "Kanata Haluka" Released: October 28, 2022

Suzume (Japanese: すずめの戸締まり, Hepburn: Suzume no Tojimari) is a collaborative album by Japanese rock band Radwimps and composer Kazuma Jinnouchi. It is the soundtrack to the 2022 Japanese animated film by Makoto Shinkai. The album was released worldwide on November 11, 2022, the day of the film's release, by EMI Records and Muzinto Records. In 2023, it won Best Music at the 46th Japan Academy Film Prize and Top Soundtrack Album at the 34th RTHK International Pop Poll Awards.

== Background ==
In September 2022, it was announced that Radwimps, who had previously worked with director Makoto Shinkai on the anime films Your Name (2016) and Weathering with You (2019), would be composing the score for Suzume as a collaboration with Seattle-based composer Kazuma Jinnouchi. The project began in early 2020 when Shinkai sent the film's screenplay to vocalist Yojiro Noda, who found it "the most exciting" in comparison to Shinkai's previous two films, since Noda enjoyed road movies and was interested in abandoned buildings. The two stopped contacting for a while due to the COVID-19 pandemic, but Noda was able to write some music during that time.

Around August 2020, Noda sent Shinkai some demo tracks, which included an early version of one of the film's theme songs "Suzume". Shinkai initially wanted Noda to perform "Suzume", but they later decided that a female voice would "better define the impression of the track." The production team held auditions, and singer Toaka was selected as the vocalist. Toaka had been posting on TikTok since February 2020, releasing covers of songs from Japanese artists such as Kenshi Yonezu, Fujii Kaze, and Wednesday Campanella. Noda said that he "felt a connection between this song and Toaka that no one else could break." The second theme song "Kanata Haluka" was produced at the last minute since Shinkai wanted another song for the film. For "Kanata Haluka", Noda wanted to tell about how the film is "a story about Suzume and Sota", regardless of the various themes it explores. Noda also performed the songs "Tamaki" and "Tears of Suzume", which are not included in the film.

Some of the recording sessions were held at Abbey Road Studios in London, where Noda and Jinnouchi were present to give instructions to the orchestra in charge of performing. This marked the first time the soundtrack to a film directed by Shinkai was recorded overseas.

== Release ==
"Suzume" and "Kanata Haluka" debuted on music streaming services on September 30 and October 28, 2022, respectively. The album was released on digital music and streaming platforms on November 11, 2022, the day of the film's release. A music video for "Kanata Haluka", directed by filmmaker Tomokazu Yamada, was released online on the same day. The album was also released as a two-disc vinyl LP on March 8, 2023. The CD and vinyl versions were sold during Radwimps' North American Tour in April 2023. Anime Limited released the CD and vinyl internationally on August 28, 2023.

Radwimps and Toaka performed the theme songs on TV Asahi's Music Station program on November 11, and on TBS's CDTV Live! Live! program on November 28.

== Track listing ==
Suzume track listing
No.	Title	Lyrics	Music	Length
1.	"The First Encounter" (二人の出逢い, Futari no Deai)		Yojiro Noda	1:02
2.	"Abandoned Resort" (廃墟の温泉街, Haikyo no Onsengai)		Kazuma Jinnouchi; Noda	3:57
3.	"First Aid" (手当て, Teate)		Noda	1:24
4.	"Cat Chase" (キャットチェース, Kyatto Chēsu)		Noda	2:15
5.	"At Night in Ferry" (夜のフェリー, Yoru no Ferī)		Noda	1:53
6.	"Cat Me If You Can" (猫探し, Neko Sagashi)		Akira Kuwahara	1:33
7.	"Abandoned School" (廃校の風景, Haikō no Fūkei)		Jinnouchi	3:11
8.	"Time for Two" (二人の時間, Futari no Jikan)		Noda	2:56
9.	"Hitchhike" (ドライブ, Doraibu)		Jinnouchi	2:17
10.	"Two Little Terrors" (子守り, Komori)		Jinnouchi	1:22
11.	"Dreaming on Ferris Wheel" (廃遊園地, Hai Yuenchi)		Jinnouchi; Noda	4:51
12.	"Soldier's Break" (戦士の休息, Senshi no Kyūsoku)		Noda	2:51
13.	"Shinkansen Super Express" (新幹線の旅, Shinkansen no Tabi)		Jinnouchi	1:31
14.	"History of Mimizu" (ミミズの歴史, Mimizu no Rekishi)		Noda	1:26
15.	"Significant Precursor" (予兆, Yochō)		Jinnouchi	3:04
16.	"Sky Over Tokyo" (東京上空, Tōkyō Jōkū)		Noda	4:14
17.	"Suzume's Departure" (決意〜旅立ち, Ketsui ~ Tabidachi)		Jinnouchi; Noda	5:29
18.	"Possessed" (狐憑き, Kitsunetsuki)		Jinnouchi	1:24
19.	"Double Riding" (自転車の二人, Jitensha no Futari)		Noda	1:42
20.	"It Wasn't a Dream" (夢じゃなかった, Yume ja Nakatta)		Noda	1:51
21.	"The Other Side of the Door" (常世, Tokoyo)		Jinnouchi; Noda	1:08
22.	"Aftermath" (丘上の要石, Okaue no Kanameishi)		Jinnouchi	1:43
23.	"To Be with Sota" (草太の元へ, Sōta no Moto e)		Noda; Jinnouchi	2:23
24.	"Prayer" (祈り, Inori)		Jinnouchi	3:05
25.	"Closing the Door" (戸締まり, Tojimari)		Noda; Jinnouchi	3:52
26.	"Kanata Haluka" (カナタハルカ)	Noda	Noda	5:55
27.	"Suzume" (すずめ; featuring Toaka)	Noda	Noda	3:58
28.	"Tamaki"	Noda	Noda	4:55
29.	"Tears of Suzume" (すずめの涙, Suzume no Namida)	Noda	Noda	4:35
Total length:				81:47

== Charts ==
=== Weekly charts ===
Weekly chart performance for Suzume
Chart (2022)	Peak position
Japanese Albums (Oricon)	7
Japanese Combined Albums (Oricon)	5
Japanese Hot Albums (Billboard Japan)	3

=== Monthly charts ===
Monthly chart performance for Suzume
Chart (2022)	Peak position
Japanese Albums (Oricon)	12

== Release history ==
Release dates and formats for Suzume
Region	Date	Format(s)	Label	Ref.
Various	November 11, 2022	Digital download; streaming	EMI; Muzinto	
Japan	November 11, 2022	CD	EMI; Muzinto	
Japan	March 8, 2023	Vinyl LP	EMI; Muzinto	
Mainland China	June 2023	CD; vinyl LP	China Record Corporation	
Various	August 28, 2023	CD; vinyl LP	Anime Limited	
