= Anew (album) =

Studio album by Radwimps
- Released: October 8, 2025
- Genre: Rock
- Length: 48:14
- Language: Japanese
- Label: EMI; Muzinto

Radwimps chronology
| Suzume (2022) | Anew (2025) |

Singles from Anew
- 1. "Tamamono" Released: April 15, 2025; 2. "Meidai" Released: July 23, 2025

Anew (Japanese: あにゅー, Hepburn: Anyū) is the fourteenth studio album by Japanese rock band Radwimps. It was released on October 8, 2025, by EMI Records and Muzinto Records. The release of the album marks Radwimps' first studio album (excluding film soundtracks) in four years, and coincides with the celebration of their major debut's 20th anniversary.

== 20th anniversary ==
A 20th anniversary special box edition of the album, which was available for pre-order in July 2025, was also released alongside the standard edition. The box set includes interviews, footage of the 2007 Yokohama Arena performance "September-san" (セプテンバーさん), select songs from Fuji Rock Festival '25, along with additional behind-the-scenes clips.

== "Tamamono" and "Meidai" ==
Two of the album's tracks were originally released as singles for Japanese television programming:

- "Tamamono" was the main opening theme for Anpan, a Japanese drama released by network NHK, originally airing from March to September 2025.
- "Meidai" served as the theme for News zero, a Japanese NTV news broadcast, and was released on July 23, 2025.

== Track listing ==
| No. | Title | Length |
|---|---|---|
| 1. | "Meidai" (命題) | 4:51 |
| 2. | "Maafaka" (まーふぁか) | 2:16 |
| 3. | "World End Girl Friend" (ワールドエンドガールフレンド) | 3:13 |
| 4. | "Dasai Dazai" | 2:50 |
| 5. | "How Should I" (なんていう) | 4:20 |
| 6. | "Tamamono" (賜物) | 4:49 |
| 7. | "Mountain Vanilla" | 3:28 |
| 8. | "Odakyu Line" | 4:50 |
| 9. | "Hitsu Zetsu" (筆舌) | 5:55 |
| 10. | "Period." (ピリオド。) | 1:55 |
| 11. | "Echo in the Ruins" (成れの果てで鳴れ) | 4:10 |
| 12. | "Piaf" (ピアフ) | 5:37 |
| Total length: | | 48:14 |

== Bonus tracks ==
Digital release exclusive

The digital release of Anew features a new version of Radwimps' single "Dai-Dai-En" featuring Zorn (2023), a collaboration with Japanese hip-hop MC Zorn.

Physical release bonus track

Physical releases of Anew include an orchestral version of track 6, "Tamamono". This version was first featured in the final episode of NHK drama series Anpan. The single release of the orchestra version is also available on streaming platforms.

== Charts ==
=== Weekly charts ===
Weekly chart performance for Anew
| Chart (2025) | Peak position |
|---|---|
| Japanese Albums (Oricon) | 1 |
| Japanese Combined Albums (Oricon) | 1 |
| Japanese Hot Albums (Billboard Japan) | 1 |

=== Monthly charts ===
Monthly chart performance for Anew
| Chart (2025) | Position |
|---|---|
| Japanese Albums (Oricon) | 9 |
| Japanese Rock Albums (Oricon) | 1 |

=== Year-end charts ===
Year-end chart performance for Anew
| Chart (2025) | Position |
|---|---|
| Japanese Albums (Oricon) | 79 |
| Japanese Download Albums (Billboard Japan) | 65 |
| Japanese Top Albums Sales (Billboard Japan) | 90 |
