= Anti Anti Generation =

Studio album by Radwimps
- Released: December 12, 2018
- Genres: Alternative rock; pop rock; pop rap
- Length: 70:10
- Labels: EMI; Universal

Radwimps chronology
Human Bloom (2016)	Anti Anti Generation (2018)	Weathering with You (2019)

Singles from Anti Anti Generation
- 1. "Saihate Aini/Brain Washing" Released: May 10, 2017; 2. "Mountain Top" Released: February 21, 2018; 3. "Catharsist" Released: June 6, 2018

Anti Anti Generation is the tenth studio album by the Japanese rock band Radwimps. It was released on December 12, 2018, by EMI Records and Universal. The album reached No. 1 on the Japanese albums chart.

== Track listing ==
No.	Title	Length
1.	"Anti Anti Overture"	1:20
2.	"Tazuna"	3:23
3.	"Never Ever Ender"	5:31
4.	"IKIJIBIKI feat.Taka"	3:49
5.	"Catharsist" (カタルシスト)	4:02
6.	"Brain Washing(Anti Anti Mix)" (洗脳(Anti Anti Mix))	5:30
7.	"Sokkenai" (そっけない)	6:29
8.	"<Homework Announce-skit->" (<宿題発表-skit->)	1:10
9.	"Paparazzi"	5:26
10.	"Hocuspocus"	4:10
11.	"Banzai Sensho" (万歳千唱)	4:22
12.	"I I U"	3:02
13.	"Nakidashisodayo feat.Aimyon" (泣き出しそうだよ feat.あいみょん)	4:39
14.	"Tie Tongue feat.Miyachi, Tabu Zombie"	4:21
15.	"Mountain Top"	3:18
16.	"Saihate Aini" (サイハテアイニ)	3:41
17.	"Seikai(18FES ver.)" (正解(18FES ver.))	5:57
Total length:		1:10:10

== Charts ==
=== Weekly charts ===
Chart (2018)	Peak position
Japan Albums (Oricon)	1
Japan Hot Albums (Billboard)	1

=== Year-end charts ===
Chart (2019)	Position
Japanese Albums (Oricon)	36

== Accolade ==
Year	Ceremony	Award	Work	Result
2019	Space Shower Music Awards	Best Video of the Year	"Catharsist"	Won
