= Radwimps =

Japanese rock band

RADWIMPS
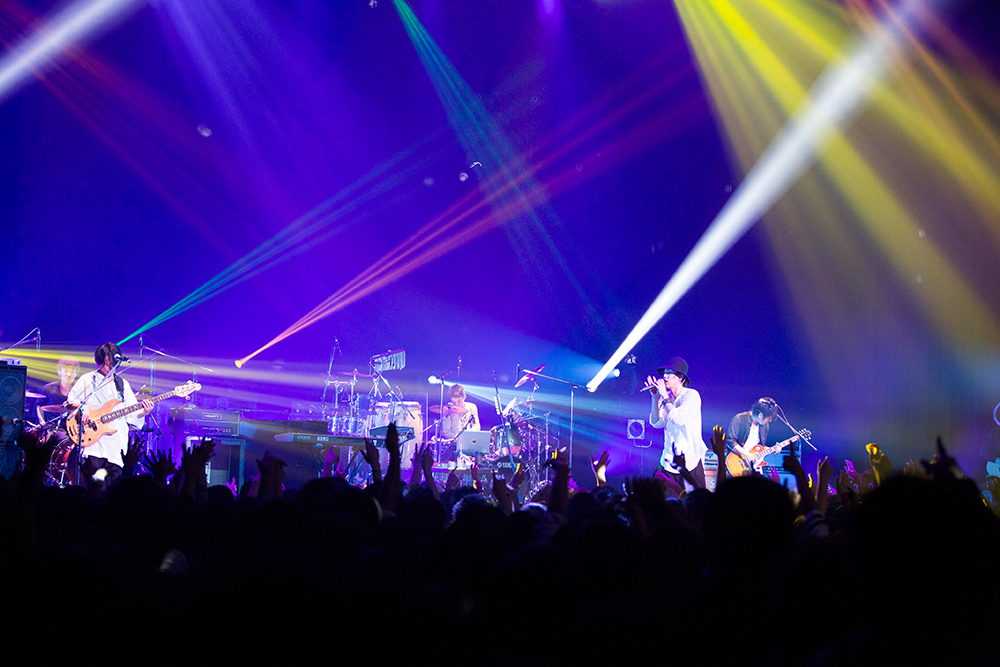
- Radwimps performing in 2016

Background information
- Also known as: Rad (ラッド, Raddo), Misoshiru's (味噌汁's)
- Origin: Kanagawa, Japan
- Genres: Alternative rock; indie rock; post-punk; pop rock; funk rock; jazz-rock; emo; rap rock
- Years active: 2001–present
- Labels: Newtraxx; Virgin; EMI; Muzinto
- Members: Yojiro Noda; Yusuke Takeda; Satoshi Yamaguchi
- Past members: Yūsuke Saiki; Kei Asō; Akio Shibafuji; Akira Kuwahara
- Website: radwimps.jp

Radwimps (Japanese: ラッドウインプス, Hepburn: Raddo'uinpusu; stylized in all caps) is a Japanese rock band who debuted independently in 2003 and signed with Toshiba EMI's Virgin Records label in 2005. The band's name, Radwimps, was formed from two English slang terms, "rad" and "wimp". According to the band, the coined word had several meanings, including "excellent weakling" and "superlative coward".

Radwimps achieved commercial success in 2006 with their album Radwimps 4: Okazu no Gohan and are best known for their later singles "Order Made" (2008) and "Dada" (2011), both of which hit number one on the Oricon Singles Chart. They have also gained recognition for providing the soundtracks to the anime films Your Name (2016), Weathering with You (2019), and Suzume (2022), all three by Makoto Shinkai.

== History ==
=== 2001–2005: Early work ===
Radwimps formed in 2001 in Kanagawa, Japan during their first year of high school. The five original members had been friends since middle school. Lead vocalist Yojiro Noda first became interested in music after hearing Oasis in middle school, when he would try to remember the guitar chords and sing to Oasis songs.

The band's activities were initially centred on Yokohama, and their first performance took place on BB Street in Kannai district on 5 February 2002. At this point, guitarist Akira Kuwahara dropped out of high school in order to focus on the band. In September and August 2002, Radwimps partook in the Yokohama High School Music Festival and eventually won the grand prize for the competition with the song "Moshi mo". "Moshi mo" was released as the band's debut single in May 2003, with 10,000 copies pressed and sold for 100 yen each. Following this single, Radwimps toured the Yokohama area, including a performance as the sole act at Yokohama's Club 24West. The band released their debut album, Radwimps, in July through independent label Newtraxx, featuring songs they wrote in middle school. The following August, after a guest appearance at the Yokohama High School Music Festival, the band went on hiatus for Noda and other members to focus on their school exams.

Radwimps returned from hiatus in March 2004, though Kei Asō, Yūsuke Saiki, and Akio Shibafumi did not rejoin the group. To replace the musicians, the band added acquaintances, such as drummer Satoshi Yamaguchi and bassist Yusuke Takeda. Radwimps immediately began recording new songs, and by July had released a second single, "Kiseki", and performed a three-month Japan-wide tour. Right after the end of the tour, the band started work on their second album, Radwimps 2: Hatten Tojō, which was finalized by the end of the year and released in March. Directly after the release, the group departed on a five-month Radwimps Haruna Tour (はるなっTOUR) and also performed at high-profile summer music festivals, such as Setstock, Rock in Japan, and Summer Sonic. During this time, the band released a third single, "Hexun / Kanashi", which was their first charting release.

=== 2005–2006: Major record deal ===
In November 2005, the band made their major debut under Toshiba EMI's Virgin Records label, with the single "Nijūgoko-me no Senshokutai", followed by "EDP (Tonde Hi ni Iru Natsu no Kimi)" in January, both of which rose to the top 50. In shifting to a major label, Noda explained that the band took the same stance as they had as an independent group, and that "If we thought we were bigger on a major label, that would have been a big mistake". The band's third and first major-label album, Radwimps 3: Mujintō ni Motte Ikiwasureta Ichimai, regraded 3 in March 2006, was a landmark in establishing their popularity, debuting at number 13 on the Oricon Albums Chart. Radwimps 3 saw a change in the band's musical style, allowing them to be more experimental in their sound.

By the end of 2006, the band's popularity had increased significantly: their album Radwimps 4: Okazu no Gohan, led by the top-20 singles "Futarigoto" and "Yūshinron" and the top-5 "Setsuna Rensa", debuted at number five and had an initial shipment of more than 100,000 copies. At this time, the band's older releases, such as Radwimps, Radwimps 2, and "Kiseki", began charting for the first time, with Radwimps eventually being certified Gold by the Recording Industry Association of Japan. In the next three years, both Radwimps and Radwimps 2 charted for approximately 100 weeks, and as of early 2011, Radwimps 3 and Radwimps 4 still continued to chart.

=== 2008–2012: First number-one single ===
In 2008, the band achieved their first number-one single, with "Order Made", on the Oricon charts. Their 2009 album, Altocolony no Teiri, sold around 213,000 copies in its first week, debuting at number two on the Oricon charts. The band achieved their second Oricon number-one single, "Dada", in 2011.

In 2011, Radwimps released their sixth album, Zettai Zetsumei, which debuted at number two on the Oricon charts and went on to be certified Platinum by the RIAJ. Following this release, the band embarked on their Zettai Enmei Tour throughout Japan from April to August 2011.

On 11 March 2012, Radwimps released the single "Hakujitsu" (白日; "Broad Daylight") on YouTube, commemorating the one-year anniversary of the 2011 Tōhoku earthquake and tsunami.

=== 2016–2019: International exposure with Your Name. and Weathering with You ===
On 24 August 2016, Radwimps released the soundtrack album Your Name (君の名は。, Kimi no Na wa.), to the anime film of the same name, directed by Makoto Shinkai. The film was an international success, further boosting the band's global profile and sending them to number two on the Billboard World Albums chart. The record also charted at number 16 on Billboard Heatseekers, and number 15 on Billboard's Soundtrack Albums chart. In their home country of Japan, it was certified Double Platinum by the RIAJ, with over 500,000 copies sold, making it the band's best-selling album. It went on to win the Japan Record Special Award, the Japan Academy Prize for Outstanding Achievement in Music, and Soundtrack Album of the Year at the 31st Japan Gold Disc Awards.

Three months after that release, Radwimps returned with their ninth studio album, Human Bloom. On 19 April 2017, while in the middle of their Human Bloom Tour, Radwimps performed as a guest act for Coldplay's A Head Full of Dreams Tour at Tokyo Dome. In the same month, they also added Singapore to their Asian tour. On 10 May 2017, Radwimps released the single "Saihate Ai ni / Sennou".

At the end of 2018, they issued their next album, Anti Anti Generation, featuring Taka of One Ok Rock, singer-songwriter Aimyon, Tabu Zombie of Soil & "Pimp" Sessions, and rapper Miyachi. The record produced three singles: "Saihate Aini / Brainwashing", "Mountain Top", and "Catharsis". The album peaked at number one on both Oricon and Japan's Billboard charts, receiving a Gold certification from the RIAJ for sales of 100,000 copies. The band followed it with their Anti Anti Generation Tour 2019, from June to August.

In 2019, Radwimps provided music for Shinkai's next film, Weathering with You, released on 19 July. The album debuted at no. 3 on the Oricon Albums Chart, before peaking at no. 2 in the following week. It won the 34th Japan Gold Disc Award for Animation Album of the Year, which made it the top-selling anime album of 2019, with more than 128,000 copies sold that year. It also won the 43rd Japan Academy Film Prize for Best Music and Best Soundtrack at the 24th Space Shower Music Awards.

=== 2020–2021: Forever Daze and 15th anniversary ===
Radwimps opened the year 2020 by announcing the nationwide Konnichiwa Nippon Tour 2020. However, the tour suffered from several delays across 2020 and 2021 because of the COVID-19 pandemic, before being officially cancelled in March 2022. Originally designed to be the largest in the band's history, encompassing four stadium concerts, Radwimps concluded that "holding the tour in a form that significantly deviates from our original intentions would be unfortunate," leading to its ultimate cancellation. Their previously announced 2020 world tour, which included summer dates in North America as well as planned European and Asian legs, was also eventually cancelled on 4 June.

On 20 March, Radwimps released the digital single "Light the Light" with its music video. The band composed the song in response to the COVID-19 pandemic, intending it to support people in China. On 5 April, Radwimps issued a new single titled "Nekojarashi (猫じゃらし)". Centered on the theme of "simple happiness," the band launched a promotional fan campaign encouraging listeners to create custom cover art featuring photos of their own daily moments of joy using a dedicated "Nekojarashi" frame. Fans were invited to share their creations on social media using a specific hashtag, with submitted posts selected for inclusion in the song's music video, which was eventually released on 15 May. On 9 May, the band released another single "Shinsekai (新世界)", which was written for and performed on TV Asahi's Music Station the previous day.

On 3 June, Radwimps dropped a new song called "Cocorononaca (ココロノナカ)". Another track titled "Blame Summer (夏のせい)" was released on 23 July alongside its music video, which featured Japanese actress Anna Yamada, as an Apple Music exclusive before expanding to other streaming services on 31 August. Two days later, Radwimps released their first-ever EP Blame Summer, which included the complete version of "Cocorononaca", an English version of "Blame Summer", and four previously released 2020 singles.

On 22 and 23 November, Radwimps held a special fifteenth-anniversary concert at Yokohama Arena, which had been announced in October. The two-day livestream event was conducted with a limited in-person audience in adherence to COVID-19 safety guidelines. The performances featured special guest appearances by Aimer on the first day and Hanaregumi on the second day.

On 3 December, Radwimps announced "Shin Sekai Nowhere", a role-playing virtual live concert experience. The show took place on 29 and 30 December, and was made available to viewers across more than 40 countries. The experience returned for additional performances from 16 to 18 July 2021, and again two weeks later for two days.

On 4 April 2021, Radwimps a digital single titled "Iron Feather (鋼の羽根)", followed by its music video on 13 April. On 16 July, Radwimps began a week-long teaser campaign that culminated with the announcement of their upcoming studio album and the release of the single "Twilight". The song served as the theme song for We Are One, a short drama project produced by Shueisha and Toei Animation to celebrate the 100th volume and 1,000th episode of One Piece.

On 6 August, Radwimps released the digital single "Utakata-Uta (うたかた歌)", featuring actor and singer Masaki Suda, coinciding with the theatrical release of Yoji Yamada's film It's a Flickering Life. The track served as the theme song for the film, a project commemorating the 100th anniversary of Shochiku in which Suda co-starred alongside Noda. The music video was issued a week later. On 18 August, Radwimps put out "Summer Daze" alongside its music video.

On 8 October, the band announced that their upcoming studio album would be titled Forever Daze and scheduled its release for 23 November. The album's tracklist included the four singles released earlier that year, alongside "Blame Summer" and a re-recorded version of "Grand Escape". On November 5, Radwimps issued the track "Makafuka" together with its music video. The song served as the theme song for the smartphone game Gran Saga, which would be released on 18 November.

Upon its release, Forever Daze peaked at number three on both Oricon Albums Chart and Billboard Japan Hot Albums. Three days later, the music video of "Shiwakucha" featuring Awich was released. To promote Forever Daze, Radwimps embarked on the Forever In The Daze Tour. The tour was held in six cities with twelve shows across Japan, started in Kanagawa on 4 December and concluded in Miyagi on 30 January 2022.

In September 2021, Akira Kuwahara announced that he would go on hiatus for an indefinite period of time, after the weekly magazine Shūkan Bunshun reported his extramarital affair with a former model.

=== 2022: The Last Ten Years and Suzume ===
On 4 March 2022, Radwimps dropped the soundtrack album for Michihito Fujii's film, The Last Ten Years, following its initial announcement in September 2021. This marked the band's debut live-action scoring. The album was issued alongside the theme song "Ms. Phenomenal (うるうびと)" on the same day with the film's release, with the track later receiving a Gold streaming certification from the Recording Industry Association of Japan (RIAJ) for reaching 50 million streams. On 12 March, Radwimps released the music video for "Ms. Phenomenal", which was directed by Fujii, shot by the film's main crew, and incorporated still photography taken by its cinematographer, Keisuke Imamura. The video features Kazuto Manabe, the film's male lead, played by Kentaro Sakaguchi, in events set after the story of the film.

On 22 July, Radwimps released the digital single "Ningen Gokko (人間ごっこ」)" as the theme song for the TBS' legal comedy-drama series Ishiko and Haneo: You're Suing Me?, which had premiered a week earlier. An accompanying music video was subsequently released on August 19.

On 20 September, Radwimps revealed that they had teamed up with composer Kazuma Jinnouchi to score Shinkai's film Suzume, making this the third time the band collaborated with the director. On 30 September, the band released the theme song "Suzume (すずめ)", which had been previously featured in the film's first three trailers. For the track, Radwimps collaborated with Toaka, a young singer who had been covering Japanese songs and released an original song titled "The Little Mermaid (人魚姫)" on her TikTok. The song achieved commercial success, receiving a Gold download certification from the RIAJ for exceeding 100,000 paid digital downloads, as well as a Platinum streaming certification for surpassing 100 million streams. "Suzume" won Best Anime Song at the 2024 Animania Awards, and was nominated for Best Anime Song at the 8th Crunchyroll Anime Awards.

In October, Kuwahara returned to the band after his year-long hiatus. On November 11, coinciding with Suzume's theatrical release, Radwimps released the soundtrack album alongside the music video for its second theme song, "Kanata Haluka (カナタハルカ)", which later earned a Platinum streaming certification from the RIAJ. Like its two predecessors, Suzume received critical acclaim, peaking at number three on both Billboard Japan Hot Albums and Oricon Digital Albums Chart. The album also won Best Music at the 46th Japan Academy Film Prize, marking three wins out of three for the band. Suzume was also nominated for Best Music - Feature at the 51st Annie Awards and Discovery of the Year at the 2023 World Soundtrack Awards.

=== 2023–2024: World tours ===
In 2023, Radwimps embarked on a world tour, marking their first international tour in five years. The North American leg ran across six cities with eight shows from 16 April to 30 April, while the European leg spanned five shows across five cities from 21 May to 30 May. Between international legs, the band embarked on the Back to the Live House Tour 2023, their first domestic club tour in eight years, from 13 June to 12 July, performing ten shows across five Zepp venues in Japan. The Asian leg began in Seoul on 21 July, followed by an Australian leg in Sydney and Melbourne in October. The world tour concluded in Shanghai on 24 October as a later addition to the Asian itinerary, ultimately comprised a total of 32 shows in 24 cities across all legs, all of which sold out.

On 18 April, they put out a new single titled "Kanashibari", featuring young singer-songwriter Ao, as the theme song for TV Asahi's drama series Unknown. The music video was issued a week later.

On 15 May, Radwimps performed their new track "Dai-Dan-En (大団円)" alongside rapper Zorn at the opening ceremony of the J.League 30th Anniversary Special Match, ahead of the match between Kashima Antlers and Nagoya Grampus, held at the Japan National Stadium. The performance featured approximately 900 junior high and high school students from various schools across the country. Choreography for the performance was created by Shintaro Hirahara, who previously served as executive choreographer for the opening and closing ceremonies of the Tokyo 2020 Olympic and Paralympic Games. "Dai-Dan-En" was digitally released on 4 July, followed by its music video three days later.

On 8 January 2024, following the success of the 2023 world tour, Radwimps announced another world tour, titled The Way You Yawn, and the Outcry of Peace. The Latin American leg spanned four shows across four cities from 15 March to 24 March. The Asian leg began in Tokyo on 6 April and was originally set to end in Seoul on 26 May, before a Kanazawa show announced on 14 April extended the leg to 15 June, bringing the total to 15 shows across 12 cities.

The same month, Radwimps unveiled the official studio recording version of "Seikai (正解)", a track originally written for and performed at the third iteration of NHK television special 18Fes. in 2018. While the original live event performance was included on Anti Anti Generation, the studio version was digitally released as a single on 24 January. The release featured five tracks: the studio version, mixed and female three-part choral arrangements, an instrumental version, and a piano accompaniment version. The music video was released on 22 February, followed by a limited CD physical edition on 28 February, which included sheet music. "Seikai" earned a Platinum certification for streaming from RIAJ.

In October, they announced that they had parted ways with Kuwahara, leaving only Noda and Takeda as the two official active members.

=== 2025–present: Anew and 20th anniversary ===
In February 2025, Radwimps launched a special 20th-anniversary website, and they began highlighting past milestones through a series of retrospective posts on their social media accounts. The same month, they confirmed that their new song "Tamamono (賜物)" would serve as the theme for the 112th asadora, Anpan, which began airing on 31 March. A music video for the song was released in April, and it marked the first appearance of Jun Shirakawa as the band's supporting guitarist, replacing Kuwahara.

On 23 June, the band announced a special live session of "Tamamono", which premiered on 29 June 2025 on their YouTube channel. The livestream also featured a performance of the song "Meidai (命題)", which debuted in and had been used as the theme song for NTV's News Zero since March, as well as the surprise announcement of a new album that was scheduled for release on 8 October, and the band's nationwide 20th-anniversary tour, which will include three consecutive days at Yokohama Arena, with special guests Bump of Chicken, Yoasobi, and Vaundy, respectively. The tour began in Hiroshima on 18 October and ended in Tokyo on 27 December.

The cover of the new album, titled Anew, was revealed on 12 September, together with a twelve-track tracklist that included "Tamamono" and "Meidai". On 22 September, it was announced that "Piaf (ピアフ)", the last track on Anew, would replace "Meidai" as the theme song of News Zero, starting on 29 September.

On 8 October, the single "World End Girl Friend (ワールドエンドガールフレンド)" and its music video were issued alongside Anew. The album debuted atop the Oricon Albums Chart and the Billboard Japan Hot Albums chart, marking the band's first record in more than six years to top the latter.

On 21 October, the music video of "Hitsu Zetsu (筆舌)" was released, featuring Japanese actress Suzu Hirose. It was directed by Michihito Fujii, marking his second contribution to the band's music video.

On 2 November, Radwimps announced Dear Jubilee, a tribute album commemorating their 20th anniversary, and teased its fourteen tracks performed by various artists. The album had been confirmed earlier on 20 October, with a scheduled release date of 19 November. The songs and participating artists were revealed daily starting on 3 November. Ultimately, the album featured Kenshi Yonezu, Mrs. Green Apple, Vaundy, Yorushika, and Yoasobi, among others, reinterpreting Radwimps songs. Upon release, the record debuted at number one on the Billboard Japan Hot Albums, and received nomination for Album of the Year at the 2026 Music Awards Japan.

On 27 December, Satoshi Yamaguchi made a return to the stage at Ariake Arena, after being on hiatus since 2015 due to a medical condition. He was accompanied by Noda and Takeda as well as the other touring members and performed "25kome No Senshokutai (25コ目の染色体)". Earlier in the year, Yamaguchi, in collaboration with Yamaha, developed a voice-operated drum kit that enabled him to start playing again despite his musician's dystonia. In recent years, Yamaguchi has published research on the topic of his condition and has held events at universities such as McMaster, Stanford, and Harvard to give the lecture series "The Past Can be Changed" as well as to perform.

On New Year's Eve, Radwimps participated in the 76th NHK Kōhaku Uta Gassen, marking their third appearance on the annual broadcast since their debut on the 67th edition in 2016. They performed "Tamamono" with scenes from Anpan playing in the background, followed with "Seikai", with a choir.

On 29 May 2026, Radwimps announced the Yurinchi Tour, their first tour exclusively for members of the band's official fan club. The tour opened at Zepp Nagoya on 22 July and concluded at Zepp Sapporo on 25 October, with all performances held at Zepp venues across Japan. On 31 May, the band announced that their concert film RADWIMPS 20th Anniversary Live Tour would be released on Blu-ray and DVD on 12 August, following its worldwide streaming release on Netflix on 20 June. The release features twenty one songs, recorded at Ariake Arena during the final date of the tour. The Blu-ray and DVD editions also include bonus footage of performances featuring guest acts Bump of Chicken, Vaundy, and Yoasobi, recorded at Yokohama Arena from 22 to 24 November 2025, as well as performances of "How should I (なんていう)" and "Echo in the Ruins (成れの果てで鳴れ)" from the Nagano and Nagoya shows, respectively.

On 3 August, Radwimps confirmed their contribution to Michihito Fujii's new film, You, Like a Star with a theme song "Yuzutsu (夕星-ゆうづつ-)". The music video, also directed by Fujii, premiered on 9 October to coincide with the film's nationwide theatrical release. On 18 October, the band released a music video for an additional song titled "You, Like a Star (汝、星のごとく)", sharing its title with the film.

On 28 October, Radwimps released the digital track "Shabadaba", which had premiered as the theme song for Fuji TV's drama PoliticaLupin, on 7 October, while its music video followed on 4 November. The song gained widespread media attention for its blunt, politically charged lyrics criticizing government figures and authority.

== Side projects ==
Radwimps have also released music under the moniker Misoshiru's ("the miso soups"), beginning with the song "Jennifer Yamada-san" from the 2006 single "Yūshinron". A band with a primarily punk rock sound who perform disguised in Groucho glasses and red T-shirts, Misoshiru's released their debut album, Me So She Loose, in March 2013.

In 2008, Yojiro Noda acted as a record producer for the first time, writing and producing the song "Labrador" for singer Chara, which was used as the leading promotional track for her album Honey. During the recording sessions, Noda collaborated with musicians such as Nobuaki Kaneko (Rize), Yoshifumi Naoi (Bump of Chicken), Susumu Nishikawa (Diamond Head), and Koichi Tsutaya.

In 2010, Radwimps took part in a special project called Terrakoya, a commemorative band formed for the EMI Rocks 50th anniversary of EMI Music Japan rock concert, featuring Radwimps along with Acidman, Fujifabric, Atsushi Horie (Straightener), Susumu Nishikawa, The Telephones, and Kazuya Yoshii. The band released the song "Emi" in November, written by Noda in collaboration with Yoshii.

Yojiro Noda made his solo debut under the name Illion in 2013 and released his debut album, Ubu, on 25 February 2013, in the United Kingdom.

== Songwriting ==
Lead vocalist Yojiro Noda writes all of the band's music and lyrics (the only exception currently is the bonus track "Yonaki" from Radwimps 4, written by Akira Kuwahara). Almost all of Noda's lyrics are based on events he has experienced, or nonfictional events. "Enren" from Radwimps 4: Okazu no Gohan, released in 2006, was the first fictional-themed song Noda wrote since the band formed.

== Band members ==
Current members

- Yojiro Noda (野田洋次郎) – lead vocals (2001–present), rhythm guitar (2005–present)
- Yusuke Takeda (武田祐介) – bass guitar, backing vocals (2003–present)
- Satoshi Yamaguchi (山口智史) – drums, backing vocals (2003–present; on hiatus since 2015)

Former members

- Yūsuke Saiki (斉木祐介) – rhythm guitar (2001–2002)
- Kei Asō (朝生恵) – bass guitar (2001–2002)
- Akio Shibafuji (芝藤昭夫) – drums (2001–2002)
- Akira Kuwahara (桑原彰) – lead guitar, backing vocals (2001–2024; on hiatus from 2021 until 2022)

Touring members

- Toshiki Hata (刃田綴色) – drums (2017–2020)
- Jun Shirakawa (白川詢) – lead guitar (2025–present)
- Mizuki Mori (森瑞希) – drums (2017–present)
- Masafumi Eno (エノマサフミ) – drums (2020–present)

Timeline

== Discography ==
- Radwimps (2003)
- Radwimps 2: Hatten Tojō (2005)
- Radwimps 3: Mujintō ni Motte Ikiwasureta Ichimai (2006)
- Radwimps 4: Okazu no Gohan (2006)
- Altocolony no Teiri (2009)
- Zettai Zetsumei (2011)
- Batsu to Maru to Tsumi to (2013)
- Your Name (2016)
- Human Bloom (2016)
- Anti Anti Generation (2018)
- Weathering with You (2019)
- Forever Daze (2021)
- Suzume (with Kazuma Jinnouchi) (2022)
- Anew (2025)

== Tours ==
- Radwimps Haruna Tour (RADWIMPSはるなっTOUR) (2005)
- Radwimps to Iku Mujintō Tour Nisengohyaku-en? Drink-dai wa Betto Itadakimasu. (RADWIMPSと行く無人島ツアー2500円? ドリンク代は別途頂きます。) (2006)
- September Niisan (セプテンバーにぃさん) (2006)
- Sonata to Iku Fuyu no Tour (ソナタと行く冬のツアー) (2006)
- Tour 2007 "Harumaki" (TOUR 2007 "春巻き") (2007)
- Radwimps "Iru Tokoro Nii Tour 09" (RADWIMPS "イルトコロニー TOUR 09") (2009)
- Radwimps Zettai Enmei Tour (RADWIMPS 絶対延命ツアー) (2011)
- RADWIMPS Grand Prix (2014)
- RADWIMPS 2015 Asia–Europe Live Tour (2015)
- Human Bloom Tour (2017)
- RADWIMPS Asia Live Tour (2017)
- Road to Catharsis Tour (2018)
- RADWIMPS Asia Live Tour (2018)
- Anti Anti Generation Tour (2019)
- Back to the Live House Tour (2023)
- The Way You Yawn, and the Outcry of Peace (2024)
- RADWIMPS 20th Anniversary Live Tour (2025)

== Awards and nominations ==
Year	Nominee / work	Award	Result
2002	Radwimps, "Moshi mo"	Yokohama High School Music Festival	Won
2007	"Yūshinron"	Space Shower Music Video Awards 2007 — Best Art Direction	Won
2008	"Order Made"	MTV Video Music Awards Japan 2008 — Best Rock Video	Won
2009	"Order Made"	Space Shower Music Video Awards 2009 — Best Your Choice	Won
2009	"Order Made"	Space Shower Music Video Awards 2009 — Best Rock Video	Won
2009	RADWIMPS	FM Festival "Life Music Award 2009" — Life Music of the Year	Won
2009	"Oshakashama"	FM Festival "Life Music Award 2009" — Best Lyric of Life	Won
2009	Altocolony no Teiri	FM Festival "Life Music Award 2009" — Best Album of Life	Won
2010	Altocolony no Teiri	The Second CD Shop Awards	Nominated
2010	"Oshakashama"	Space Shower Music Video Awards 2010 — Best Your Choice	Won
2010	"Oshakashama"	MTV World Stage VMAJ 2010 — Best Rock Video	Nominated
2011	"Manifesto"	Space Shower Music Video Awards 2011 — Best Your Choice	Won
2011	"Manifesto"	Space Shower Music Video Awards 2011 — Best Shooting Video	Won
2011	"Dada"	2011 MTV Video Music Aid Japan — Best Rock Video	Nominated
2012	"Kimi to Hitsuji to Ao"	MTV Video Music Awards Japan 2012 — Best Rock Video	Nominated
2014	"Last Virgin"	MTV Video Music Awards Japan 2014 — Best Rock Video	Nominated
2016	RADWIMPS	MTV Europe Music Awards 2016 — Best Japanese Act	Nominated
2016	RADWIMPS	Space Shower Music Video Awards 2016 — Best Group Artist	Nominated
2016	RADWIMPS	Japan Record Awards 2016 — Special Award	Won
2017	Your Name	Japan Academy Prize 2016 — Outstanding Achievement in Music	Won
2017	"Zenzenzense" (movie ver.)	Japan Gold Disc Award 2017 — Best 5 Songs by Download	Won
2017	"Nandemonaiya" (movie ver.)	Japan Gold Disc Award 2017 — Best 5 Songs by Download	Won
2017	Your Name	Japan Gold Disc Award 2017 — Soundtrack Album of the Year	Won
2017	RADWIMPS	Space Shower Music Awards 2017 — Best Rock Artist	Won
2017	RADWIMPS	Space Shower Music Awards 2017 — Artist of the Year	Won
2018	RADWIMPS	Space Shower Music Awards 2018 — Best Group Artist	Nominated
2019	RADWIMPS	Space Shower Music Awards 2019 — Best Group Artist	Nominated
2019	RADWIMPS	Space Shower Music Awards 2019 — Best Active Overseas	Won
2019	"Catharsis"	Space Shower Music Awards 2019 — Video of the Year	Won
2019	Weathering with You	74th Mainichi Film Awards — Best Music	Won
2020	Weathering with You	34th Japan Gold Disc Award — Animation Album of the Year	Won
2020	Weathering with You	43rd Japan Academy Film Prize — Best Music	Won
2020	Weathering with You	24th Space Shower Music Awards — Best Soundtrack	Won
2022	"Ningen Gokko"	MTV Video Music Awards Japan — Best Cinematography	Won
2023	Suzume (with Kazuma Jinnouchi)	46th Japan Academy Film Prize — Best Music	Won
2023	Suzume (with Kazuma Jinnouchi)	World Soundtrack Awards — Discovery of the Year	Nominated
2024	Suzume (with Kazuma Jinnouchi)	51st Annie Awards — Best Music – Feature	Nominated
2024	Suzume (with Kazuma Jinnouchi)	8th Crunchyroll Anime Awards – Best Score	Nominated
2024	Suzume (featuring Toaka)	8th Crunchyroll Anime Awards – Best Anime Song	Nominated

== See also ==
- Japanese rock
