= 2019 in Japanese music =

The year 2019 in Japanese music.

== Events ==
- 70th NHK Kōhaku Uta Gassen

== Number-ones ==
- Oricon number-one albums
- Oricon number-one singles
- Hot 100 number-one singles

== Awards ==
- 61st Japan Record Awards
- 2019 MTV Video Music Awards Japan

== Albums released ==
=== January ===
Date	Album	Artist	Genre	Labels
1	Ai Am Best, Too	Ai Otsuka	Pop; pop rock	Avex Trax
8	Last Gang Parade	Gang Parade	J-pop	T-Palette Records
9	19 Box	Asaka	J-pop; anison	5pg. Records
9	Boy	Okamoto's	Rock; garage rock	Ariola Japan
9	Oh My Girl Japan Debut Album	Oh My Girl	J-pop	Ariola Japan
15	Remind	Kiss Bee West	J-pop	Kiss Bee West
16	This is DaizyStripper	Daizystripper	Rock	Kiss Records
16	Touken Ranbu Original Soundtrack	Koji Endo	Film score	Toho
16	Flava	Little Glee Monster	J-pop	Sony Music Records
16	Wonder Hack	Shuta Sueyoshi	J-pop; R&B; hip hop	Avex Trax
21	F	Fujifabric	Power pop; synth-pop	Sony Music Associated Records
23	Abe Mao Best	Mao Abe	J-pop	Pony Canyon
23	Journey & My Music	Mai Fuchigami	J-pop; anison	Lantis
23	30	Denki Groove	Shibuya-kei; synth-pop	Ki/oon Music
23	Vorvados	Syu	Heavy metal; power metal	Warner Music Japan
23	Love Songs	Mariya Takeuchi	J-pop; city pop	Ariola Japan
30	Polaris	Base Ball Bear	Pop rock; alternative rock	DGP Records
30	History in the Making	Dean Fujioka	Pop	A-Sketch
30	Hilcrhyme	Hilcrhyme	Reggae; hip hop	Universal Music Japan
30	Yuki no Hana 15 Anniversary Best Bible	Mika Nakashima	Pop; pop rock	Sony Music Associated Records

=== February ===
Date	Album	Artist	Genre	Labels
4	Nissy Entertainment 5th Anniversary Best	Nissy	J-pop	Avex Trax
6	Body	Aaamyyy	Electropop	Space Shower Music
6	Double Encore	Masaharu Fukuyama	Pop; rock	Universal Music
6	Synchro	Nao Matsushita	Classical; pop	Epic Records Japan
6	Uchōten	Polkadot Stingray	Alternative rock	Universal Music
6	Hell Like Heaven	The Peggies	Alternative rock; pop rock	Epic Records Japan
6	Forme	Yuki	J-pop	Epic Records Japan
13	Shunkanteki Sixth Sense	Aimyon	Pop; rock	Unborde / Warner Music Japan
13	Love Diamonds	Tatsuya Ishii	Pop; rock; indie-pop	Sony Music Records
13	Design & Reason	Noriyuki Makihara	Pop	Buppu Label
13	Thunderbird	Ohashi Trio	J-pop	Rhythm Zone
13	Eye of the Storm	One Ok Rock	Rock	A-Sketch
20	Koda Kumi Driving Hit's 9	Koda Kumi	Drum and bass; dubstep; house	Rhythm Zone
20	Worldista	NEWS	J-pop	Johnny's Entertainment
20	F.A.R.	Marie Ueda	J-pop	Giza Studio
27	Eye	Sekai no Owari	J-pop	Toy's Factory
27	Lip	Sekai no Owari	J-pop	Toy's Factory

=== March ===
Date	Album	Artist	Genre	Labels
3	MUSiC	Shiritsu Ebisu Chugaku	J-pop	SME
6	Remember	Hiroyuki Sawano	Pop; pop rock	Sacra Music
6	#Twice2	Twice	J-pop	Warner Music Japan
6	Cat'CH The World	The World Standard	J-pop	Idol Street
13	Pages	Sexy Zone	J-pop	Pony Canyon
20	Best! Morning Musume 20th Anniversary	Morning Musume	J-pop	Zetima
29	Nucleus	Anthem	Heavy metal	Nuclear Blast

=== April ===
Date	Album	Artist	Genre	Labels
3	Band-Maiko	Band-Maiko	Hard rock; folk rock	Revolver Records
10	Penny Rain	Aimer	Pop; rock	SME Records
10	Sun Dance	Aimer	Pop; rock	SME Records
17	9999	The Yellow Monkey	Rock	Atlantic Records
17	Awaken	NCT 127	J-pop	Avex Trax
17	W.A.H.	Marie Ueda	J-pop	Giza Studio
29	Ima ga Omoide ni Naru Made	Nogizaka46	J-pop	Sony Music Records

=== May ===
Date	Album	Artist	Genre	Labels
10	Connection	Seyong	J-pop	Irving
17	Momoiro Clover Z	Momoiro Clover Z	J-pop	Evil Line Records
29	Sappy	Red Velvet	J-pop	Avex Trax
29	My Bouquet	Ran Itō	J-pop	GT Music

=== June ===
Date	Album	Artist	Genre	Labels
19	834.194	Sakanaction	Electropop; pop rock	NF Records
26	5x20 All the Best!! 1999–2019	Arashi	Pop; rock; R&B; hip hop	J Storm

=== July ===
Date	Album	Artist	Genre	Labels
3	Carrots and Sticks	Bish	‌: Punk rock; pop-punk; alternative rock	Avex Trax
3	Oh My Girl Japan 2nd Album	Oh My Girl	J-pop	Ariola Japan
10	Aurora Arc	Bump of Chicken	J-pop	Toy's Factory
10	Love	Masaki Suda	J-pop	Epic Records Japan
31	Latata	(G)I-dle	J-pop	Universal Music Japan

=== August ===
Date	Album	Artist	Genre	Labels
14	Let's Goal!: Barairo no Jinsei	Mai Kuraki	J-pop; R&B	Northern Music
28	The Side Effects	Coldrain	Post-hardcore, alternative rock; nu metal	Warner Music

=== September ===
Date	Album	Artist	Genre	Labels
3	EN.	Novelbright	Hard rock	Emperor Mode
4	New Young City	For Tracy Hyde	Dream pop	P-Vine Records
18	Perfume the Best: P Cubed	Perfume	EDM; future bass; J-pop	Universal Music Japan
18	Savage	Taichi Mukai	J-pop	Toy's Factory

=== October ===
Date	Album	Artist	Genre	Labels
2	Attitude	Mrs. Green Apple	‌: J-pop; Hard rock	EMI
7	Heart Touch	Asaka	J-pop	5pb. Records
9	Traveler	Official Hige Dandism	J-pop	Pony Canyon
11	Metal Galaxy	Babymetal	J-pop; kawaii metal	BMD Fox, Toy's Factory, Amuse
19	Hello Chapter 1: Hello, Stranger (Japanese edition)	CIX	J-pop	Warner Music Japan

=== November ===
Date	Album	Artist	Genre	Labels
6	Hyakkaryōran	Asca	J-pop, anison	Sacra Music
6	Kansha!!!!! - Thank You for 20 Years New and Best	Ai	R&B	EMI
6	Tattoo	The Boyz	J-pop	Ariola Japan
13	Love Parade	Gang Parade	J-pop	Fueled By Mentaiko
13	Apple of Universal Gravity	Ringo Sheena	Pop	EMI
20	&Twice	Twice	J-pop, EDM	Warner Music Japan
27	Beyooooond1st	Beyooooonds	J-pop	Zetima

=== December ===
Date	Album	Artist	Genre	Labels
4	Infinity	Beverly	J-pop	Avex Trax
4	Unser	Uverworld	Alternative rock	gr8! records
4	Treasure EP.Extra: Shift the Map	Ateez	J-pop	Nippon Columbia
11	Conqueror	Band-Maid	Hard rock	Revolver Records
18	I	Airi Suzuki	J-pop	Zetima
18	The Great Journey Album	Empire	J-pop	WACK, Avex Trax
18	Cross	Luna Sea	Alternative rock; progressive rock	Universal
18	Playlist	Shiritsu Ebisu Chugaku	J-pop	SME
25	α	Sayaka Yamamoto	J-pop; Rock	Universal Sigma
25	Mai Kuraki Single Collection: Chance for You	Mai Kuraki	J-pop; R&B	Northern Music

== Debuting and returning artists ==
=== Debuting groups ===
- A-Jax
- ALI
- Argonavis from BanG Dream!
- Ateez
- Ballistik Boyz from Exile Tribe
- Bialystocks
- B.O.L.T
- Boyfriend
- Beyooooonds
- Bis
- Carry Loose
- CIX
- College Cosmos
- Dialogue
- Dos Monos
- DracoVirgo
- Girls²
- Hinatazaka46
- Honest Boyz
- (G)I-dle
- Iz*One
- King Gnu
- Mameshiba no Taigun
- Oh My Girl
- @onefive
- Oneus
- Sard Underground
- Tebasaki Sensation
- The Boyz
- Yoasobi
- ZOC

=== Debuting soloists ===
- Akari Kitō
- Aimi Tanaka
- Eito
- Haruka Fukuhara
- Mayu Maeshima
- Milet
- Sayaka Yamamoto
- Taeyeon
- Toshiki Masuda'
- Vaundy
- Yuuri

=== Returning from hiatus ===
- Flumpool
- DuelJewel
- Soulhead
- Ran Itō

== Disbanding and retiring artists ==
=== Disbanding ===
- Tsuri Bit
- Negoto
- Kalafina
- Janne Da Arc
- Rock a Japonica
- Flower
- Shiggy Jr
- Country Girls
- The Hoopers
- Wake Up, Girls!
- Rhymeberry
- Kinoko Teikoku
- Pentagon
- CocoSori
- Myteen

=== Retiring ===
- Boku no Lyric no Bōyomi
- Yūsuke Tomoi
- Masako Mori

=== Going on hiatus ===
- An Cafe
- Blu-Billion
- Kana Nishino

== Deaths ==
- Yuya Uchida dies on March 17.
- Michiro Endo dies on April 25.

== See also ==
- 2019 in Japan
- 2019 in Japanese television
- List of Japanese films of 2019
