= Body (Aaamyyy album) =

Studio album by Aaamyyy
- Released: February 6, 2019
- Recorded: 2018–19
- Genre: Electropop
- Length: 34:18
- Language: Japanese
- Label: Space Shower Music
- Producer: Aaamyyy

Aaamyyy chronology
Etcetra EP (2018)	Body (2019)	Weekend / Maborosi / Etcetra (2019)

Singles from Body
- 1. "Over My Dead Body" Released: January 30, 2019

Body is the debut studio album by Japanese electronic musician Aaamyyy, released on February 6, 2019.

== Background and development ==
Aaamyyy first worked as a musician in the early 2010s after returning to Japan from Canada, as a member of electropop groups Go Retro and Eimie. In 2017 and 2018, Aaamyyy made her solo debut, releasing a series of three extended plays digitally and on cassette. Aaamyyy began recording Body in October 2018. A concept album set in 2615, the release was inspired by Netflix television shows such as Black Mirror and Maniac (2018).

The album featured collaborations with four musicians: Matton, vocalist for the Japanese band Paellas, Conyplankton from Tawings, and two US-based musicians, Computer Magic and Jil. Aaamyyy traveled to New York to collaborate with these musicians, which was shot for a Space Shower TV programme called Plan B. Aaamyyy first met Danielle Johnson of Computer Magic when she interviewed her after coming to Japan, and felt like Johnson was an extremely similar artist musically. The pair created "Z" in a three hour session primarily on an omnichord. Aaamyyy's session with Jil lasted around 20 hours, and she felt like the band created music similarly to her own band, Tempalay.

The cover artwork was produced by Margt, a Brooklyn-based creative team. The cover artwork and promotional photoshoot was shot in New York during her trip.

The album closes with the song "Eyes", a song from her previous release Etcetra EP (2018). Originally a different track was intended to be released in its place, but Aaamyyy could not secure the rights to the song.

== Promotion and release ==
"Over My Dead Body" was used as the leading promotional track from the album, and was released as a digital single on January 30, a week before the album's release. Aaamyyy held a two-date promotional tour for the release of Body: one performance in Shibuya, Tokyo on 9 March, followed by a performance in Osaka on March 30.

== Reception ==
Music journalist Tomoyuki Mori highlighted the album as one that had the potential to get popular outside of Japan, noting Body's "distinctive groove, incorporating alternative R&B and bass music". He praised Aaamyyy's songwriting and trackmaking skills, especially the storymaking in "Over My Dead Body", feeling that the lyrics "painted a feeling of romantic loss (despite the frightening title)", while her vocals simultaneously expressed dread and warmth. Daisuke Sawada of Bounce described the album as a collection of songs with light synths interwoven with strong melodies, and felt that he could feel her potential as a pop maker on this album. He singled out the urban R&B-style songs "Island" and new jack swing influenced "Ain't no Tame" as having an "exquisite" arrangement. CDJournal reviewers felt that Body was a strong work with a surprisingly low-key techno, funk and electropop atmosphere.

== Track listing ==
All tracks are written by Aaamyyy, except where noted..

No.	Title	Writer(s)	Length
1.	"β2615"		1:31
2.	"Gaia"		3:16
3.	"Subject J" (被験者J Hikensha J)		3:13
4.	"Z" (featuring Computer Magic)	Aaamyyy, Danielle Johnson	4:21
5.	"Poli Sci" (ポリシー Porishī)		2:25
6.	"Island" (featuring Matton)	Aaamyyy, Matton	3:27
7.	"Ain't no Tame" (愛のため Ai no Tame, "For Love")		4:37
8.	"All by Myself" (featuring Jil)	Aaamyyy, Jil	3:29
9.	"Over My Dead Body" (屍を越えてゆけ Shikabane o Koete Yuke)		4:51
10.	"Eyes" (featuring Cony Plankton)		3:06
Total length:			34:18

== Charts ==
Chart (2019)	Peak position
Japan Oricon weekly albums	198

== Release history ==
Region	Date	Format	Distributing Label	Catalogue codes
Japan	February 6, 2019	[[Compact disc}CD]], digital download, online streaming	Space Shower Music	PECF-3222
South Korea	February 28, 2019	Digital download	Musicaroma	
Japan	August 7, 2019	LP record	Space Shower	JSLP116
