= 2019 in Japan =

- Decades: 1990s; 2000s; 2010s; 2020s; 2030s
- See also: Other events of 2019; History of Japan • Timeline • Years

Events in the year 2019 in Japan.

In the history of Japan, it marks the last year of Heisei period, Heisei 31 (平成31年 Heisei sanjūichinen), after the abdication of Emperor Akihito on April 30, and the beginning of the Reiwa period, Reiwa 1 (令和元年 Reiwa gannen, gannen means "first year"), from May 1 under the reign of his eldest son, current Japanese emperor Naruhito. Thus, 2019 corresponds to the transition between Heisei and Reiwa in the Japanese calendar.

== Incumbents ==
- Emperor
  - Akihito (until 30 April)
  - Naruhito (starting 1 May)
- Prime Minister: Shinzo Abe – (Liberal Democratic)

=== Governors ===
- Aichi Prefecture: Hideaki Omura
- Akita Prefecture: Norihisa Satake
- Aomori Prefecture: Shingo Mimura
- Chiba Prefecture: Kensaku Morita
- Ehime Prefecture: Tokihiro Nakamura
- Fukui Prefecture: Issei Nishikawa (until 23 April); Tatsuji Sugimoto (starting 23 April)
- Fukuoka Prefecture: Hiroshi Ogawa
- Fukushima Prefecture: Masao Uchibori
- Gifu Prefecture: Hajime Furuta
- Gunma Prefecture: Masaaki Osawa (until 28 July); Ichita Yamamoto (starting 28 July)
- Hiroshima Prefecture: Hidehiko Yuzaki
- Hokkaido: Harumi Takahashi (until 23 April); Naomichi Suzuki (starting 23 April)
- Hyogo Prefecture: Toshizō Ido
- Ibaraki Prefecture: Kazuhiko Ōigawa
- Ishikawa Prefecture: Masanori Tanimoto
- Iwate Prefecture: Takuya Tasso
- Kagawa Prefecture: Keizō Hamada
- Kagoshima Prefecture: Satoshi Mitazono
- Kanagawa Prefecture: Yuji Kuroiwa
- Kochi Prefecture: Masanao Ozaki (until 7 December); Seiji Hamada (starting 7 December)
- Kumamoto Prefecture: Ikuo Kabashima
- Kyoto Prefecture: Takatoshi Nishiwaki
- Mie Prefecture: Eikei Suzuki
- Miyagi Prefecture: Yoshihiro Murai
- Miyazaki Prefecture: Shunji Kōno
- Nagano Prefecture: Shuichi Abe
- Nagasaki Prefecture: Hōdō Nakamura
- Nara Prefecture: Shōgo Arai
- Niigata Prefecture: Hideyo Hanazumi
- Oita Prefecture: Katsusada Hirose
- Okayama Prefecture: Ryuta Ibaragi
- Okinawa Prefecture: Denny Tamaki
- Osaka Prefecture:
  - until 20 March: Ichirō Matsui
  - 20 March-8 April: Hiroyuki Takeuchi
  - starting 8 April: Hirofumi Yoshimura
- Saga Prefecture: Yoshinori Yamaguchi
- Saitama Prefecture: Kiyoshi Ueda (until 31 August); Motohiro Ōno (starting 31 August)
- Shiga Prefecture: Taizō Mikazuki
- Shiname Prefecture: Zenbe Mizoguchi (until 30 April); Tatsuya Maruyama (starting 30 April)
- Shizuoka Prefecture: Heita Kawakatsu
- Tochigi Prefecture: Tomikazu Fukuda
- Tokushima Prefecture: Kamon Iizumi
- Tokyo Prefecture: Yuriko Koike
- Tottori Prefecture: Shinji Hirai
- Toyama Prefecture: Takakazu Ishii
- Wakayama Prefecture: Yoshinobu Nisaka
- Yamagata Prefecture: Mieko Yoshimura
- Yamaguchi Prefecture: Tsugumasa Muraoka
- Yamanashi Prefecture: Hitoshi Gotō (until 17 February); Kotaro Nagasaki (starting 17 February)

== Events ==
- 2019 Japanese imperial transition
  - 1 January: It was announced that the new era name (元号, gengō) for the period following Heisei will be released on April 1.
  - 8 January: 30th anniversary for the reign of Emperor Akihito.
  - 24 February: Jubilee celebrations at the National Theatre of Japan and the 30th anniversary of the state funeral of Hirohito.
  - 1 April: It was announced that Reiwa (令和) is the new federated era for the future Emperor Naruhito, and is expected to be used from May 1, 2019, onwards.
  - 30 April: Final day of reign of Emperor Akihito and Heisei era.
  - 1 May: Emperor Akihito was abdicated and became Emperor Emeritus, his eldest son, Naruhito became 126th Emperor of Japan and Reiwa era begins towards federalism and rise of reformism.
  - 22 October: The new federal emperor, Naruhito's enthronement ceremony took place, where he was duly enthroned in an ancient-style proclamation ceremony.
- 10 January: Four of the Japanese films in competition entered the 69th Berlin International Film Festival: Whistleblower by Katsuo Fukuzawa, Snow Flower by Kōjirō Hashimoto, Fortuna's Eye by Takahiro Miki, and Samurai Marathon by Bernard Rose.
- 1 April – Reiwa Shinsengumi, a new political party was founded by Tarō Yamamoto, member of the House of Councillors and former actor.
- 2 April: Two Japan Self-Defence officers are dispatched to a multinational peacekeeping force in Sinai, Egypt.
- 19 April: According to Japan National Police Agency official confirmed report, an 87 years-old driver owned vehicle crashes into pedestrian and bicycles in nearby east gate of Ikebukuro Station, Toshima, Tokyo, a mother and a children were lost to lives, nine person were wounded, a person driver has five years sentence in July 2021, and 976,000 US dollars perish pay to damaged families of relative in October 2023, both crime on dangerous drive for other persons death and woundem, according to Tokyo District Court official report.
- 26 May: U.S. President Donald Trump, during an official state visit to Japan, is the first foreign leader to meet with Emperor Naruhito.
- 26 May: According to the official report of the Japan Meteorological Agency, a temperature of 39.5 °C (103.1 °F) was observed in Saroma, Hokkaido, the highest temperature in May in Japan and Hokkaido. The temperature was unseasonably warm, where temperatures of 33 to 38 °C (91 to 100 °F) are usually reached.
- 28 May: According to an official report by the Japan National Police Agency, a stabbing occurred leaving 2 people dead with 18 injured, ending with the 51 year-old perpetrator committing suicide. The killer attacked bystanders, including elementary school students, waiting for bus near Noborito Station, Kawasaki, Kanagawa Prefecture.
- 1 June: According to a report authored by the Ministry of Land, Infrastructure, Transport and Tourism of Japan, an accident occurred involving 5-car passenger train running in reverse and colliding with a stopped car in Shin-Sugita Station, Kanagawa Prefecture on the Yokohama Seaside Passenger Line leaving 14 people wounded.
- 18 June: 2019 Yamagata earthquake, left 33 people injured. The earthquake, measuring 6.5 on the Richer Scale hit offshore of Tsuruoka, Yamagata Prefecture.
- 19 June: According to Ministry of Land, Infrastructure, Transport and Tourism of Japan, a ten car rapid express commuter train derailed in a collision with a car in Odakyu Line, Atsugi, Kanagawa Prefecture, resulting in three people injured.
- 20 June: A textile factory fire occurred in Eiheiji, Fukui Prefecture, leaving four people dead, and another four injured.
- 1 July: Japan announces tightening of high-tech exports to South Korea, effective on 4 July, thus begin the trade dispute between the two countries.
- 18 July: Kyoto Animation arson attack, Kyoto Animation's first studio is set ablaze, with 35 people known to be dead.
- 21 July: 2019 Japanese House of Councillors election
- 2 August: Japan announces the removal of South Korea from its list of most trusted trading partners, effective on 28 August 2019.
- 2019 Pacific typhoon season
  - 15 August: Typhoon Krosa, total two persons were fatalities, 55 persons were wounded in around western Honshu, according to JFDMA confirmed report.
  - 9 September: Typhoon Faxai, according to Japanese Government confirmed report, largely power outage hit in Kanagawa and Chiba Prefecture, 934,000 household affected by transmission line and tower damage in Kisarazu, Chiba Prefecture, with three persons (include two of caused by heatstroke) were death, 147 persons were wounded.
  - 22 September: Typhoon Tapah, according to JFDMA confirmed report, one person perished, with 68 persons were wounded in nationwide, a tornado hit in Nobeoka, Miyazaki Prefecture.
  - 12 October: Typhoon Hagibis, according to JFDMA confirmed report, 80 persons killed, 7 persons missing, with 447 persons were wounded in nationwide, a tornado hit in Ichihara, Chiba Prefecture.
- 28 August: According to JFDMA confirmed report, flash flood from torrential rain hit in Takeo, Saga Prefecture, resulting in four persons dead.
- 5 September: According to MLIT confirmed report, an eight car commuter train collision with trailer truck at level crossing at Keikyu Line, Kanagawa-ku, Yokohama, resulting to a truck driver losing his life, 30 persons were hurt.
- 25 October: According to Japan Meteorological Agency official confirmed report, heavy massive rain 60 to 100 mm per an hour, 160 to 260 mm total 12 hours precipitation, and resulting to debris and flash flood and landslide occurs through Boso Peninsula, Chiba Prefecture, and similar hit in Soma, Fukushima Prefecture. Official death toll is ten, another two persons were missing, according to JFDMA confirmed report.
- 31 October: 2019 Shurijo fire, a fire broke down at Shuri Castle, Shuri, Naha, Okinawa Prefecture, later the redevelopment and restoration of building would converted into a new museum after the fire.
- 29 November: The oldest living former 1980s prime minister, Yasuhiro Nakasone died, aged 101.

=== The Nobel Prize ===
- Akira Yoshino: 2019 Nobel Prize in Chemistry winner.

== Arts and entertainment ==
- 2019 in anime
- 2019 in Japanese music
- 2019 in Japanese television
- List of 2019 box office number-one films in Japan
- List of Japanese films of 2019

== Sports ==
- October 13 – 2019 Formula One World Championship is held at 2019 Japanese Grand Prix
- October 20 – 2019 MotoGP World Championship is held at 2019 Japanese motorcycle Grand Prix
- 2019 F4 Japanese Championship
- 2019 Japanese Formula 3 Championship
- 2019 Super Formula Championship
- 2019 Super GT Series
- 2019 AFC Champions League Final (Japan)
- 2019 in Japanese football
- 2019 J1 League
- 2019 J2 League
- 2019 J3 League
- 2019 Japan Football League
- 2019 Japanese Regional Leagues
- 2019 Japanese Super Cup
- 2019 Emperor's Cup
- 2019 J.League Cup

== Deaths ==
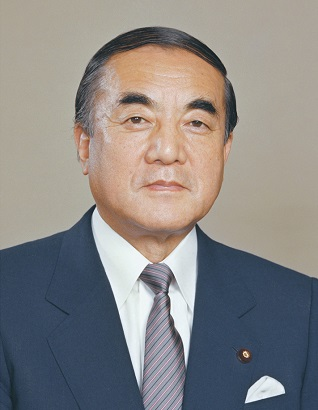
Yasuhiro Nakasone, former Prime Minister of Japan, died of natural causes at the age of 101.

In a last year of Heisei Memoriam, in between January and April 2019, among top 10 famous Japanese people who died peacefully, including Etsuko Ichihara, Fumiko Yonezawa, Kinryū Arimoto, Fumiko Hori, Junya Sato, Kōji Kitao, Yuya Uchida, Kenichi Hagiwara, Fuyumi Shiraishi, and Monkey Punch. In the first year of Reiwa Memoriam, in between April and December 2019, among top 15 famous Japanese people who died peacefully, including Machiko Kyō, Yasuo Furuhata, Atsushi Aoki, Seiko Tanabe, Tsuruko Yamazaki, Tadao Takashima, Johnny Kitagawa, Yukiya Amano, Sakahoko Nobushige, Masaichi Kaneda, Kaoru Yachigusa, Sadako Ogata, Yukihiro Takiguchi, Midori Kiuchi, and Yasuhiro Nakasone.

=== January ===
- January 12 – Etsuko Ichihara, actress (b. 1936)
- January 17 – Fumiko Yonezawa, theoretical physicist (b. 1938)
- January 20 – Masazō Nonaka, supercentenarian (b. 1905)
- January 23 – Hidekichi Miyazaki, athlete (b. 1910)
- January 30 – Shigeichi Nagano, photographer (b. 1925)

=== February ===
- February 1 – Kinryū Arimoto, voice actor (b. 1940)
- February 5 – Fumiko Hori, Nihonga painter (b. 1918)
- February 9 – Junya Sato, film director (b. 1932)
- February 10 – Kōji Kitao, sumo wrestler (b. 1963)
- February 24 – Donald Keene, scholar (b. 1922)

=== March ===
- March 17 – Yuya Uchida, singer (b. 1939)
- March 26 – Kenichi Hagiwara, actor (b. 1950)
- March 28 – Fuyumi Shiraishi, voice actress (b. 1936)

=== April ===
- April 5 – Wowaka, musician (b. 1987)
- April 11 – Monkey Punch, manga artist (b. 1937)
- April 16 – Kiyoshi Kawakubo, voice actor (b. 1929)

=== May ===
- May 12 – Machiko Kyō, actress (b. 1924)
- 20 May – Yasuo Furuhata, film director (b. 1934)

=== June ===
- June 3 – Atsushi Aoki, Japanese professional wrestler (b. 1977)
- June 6 – Seiko Tanabe, author (b. 1928)
- June 10 – Yuzuru Fujimoto, voice actor (b. 1935)
- June 12 – Tsuruko Yamazaki, artist (b. 1925)
- June 26 – Tadao Takashima, actor (b. 1930)

=== July ===
- July 9 – Johnny Kitagawa, businessman (b. 1931)
- July 18 – Yukiya Amano, diplomat (b. 1947)
- July 28 – Yū Shimaka, voice actor (b. 1949)

=== September ===
- September 2 – George Abe, author (b. 1937)
- September 16 – Sakahoko Nobushige, sumo wrestler (b. 1961)

=== October ===
- October 6 – Masaichi Kaneda, baseball pitcher (b. 1933)
- October 13 – Kanako Naito, volleyball player (b. 1980)
- October 24 – Kaoru Yachigusa, actress (b. 1931)
- October 29 – Sadako Ogata, diplomat, professor (b. 1927)

=== November ===
- November 11 – Tadashi Nakamura, voice actor (b. 1929)
- November 12 – Mitsuhisa Taguchi, Japanese footballer (b. 1955)
- November 13 – Yukihiro Takiguchi, actor (b. 1985)
- November 18 – Midori Kiuchi, actress (b. 1950)
- November 29
  - Yasuhiro Nakasone, 45th Prime Minister of Japan (b. 1918)
  - Makio Inoue, voice actor (b. 1938)

=== December ===
- December 4
  - Tetsu Nakamura, physician (b. 1946)
  - Akira Hayami, professor (b. 1929)
- December 12 – Tatsuo Umemiya, actor (b. 1938)
- December 19 – Yoshio Mochizuki, politician (b. 1947)
