= ROTH BART BARON =

Japanese musical project

ROTH BART BARON ロットバルトバロン
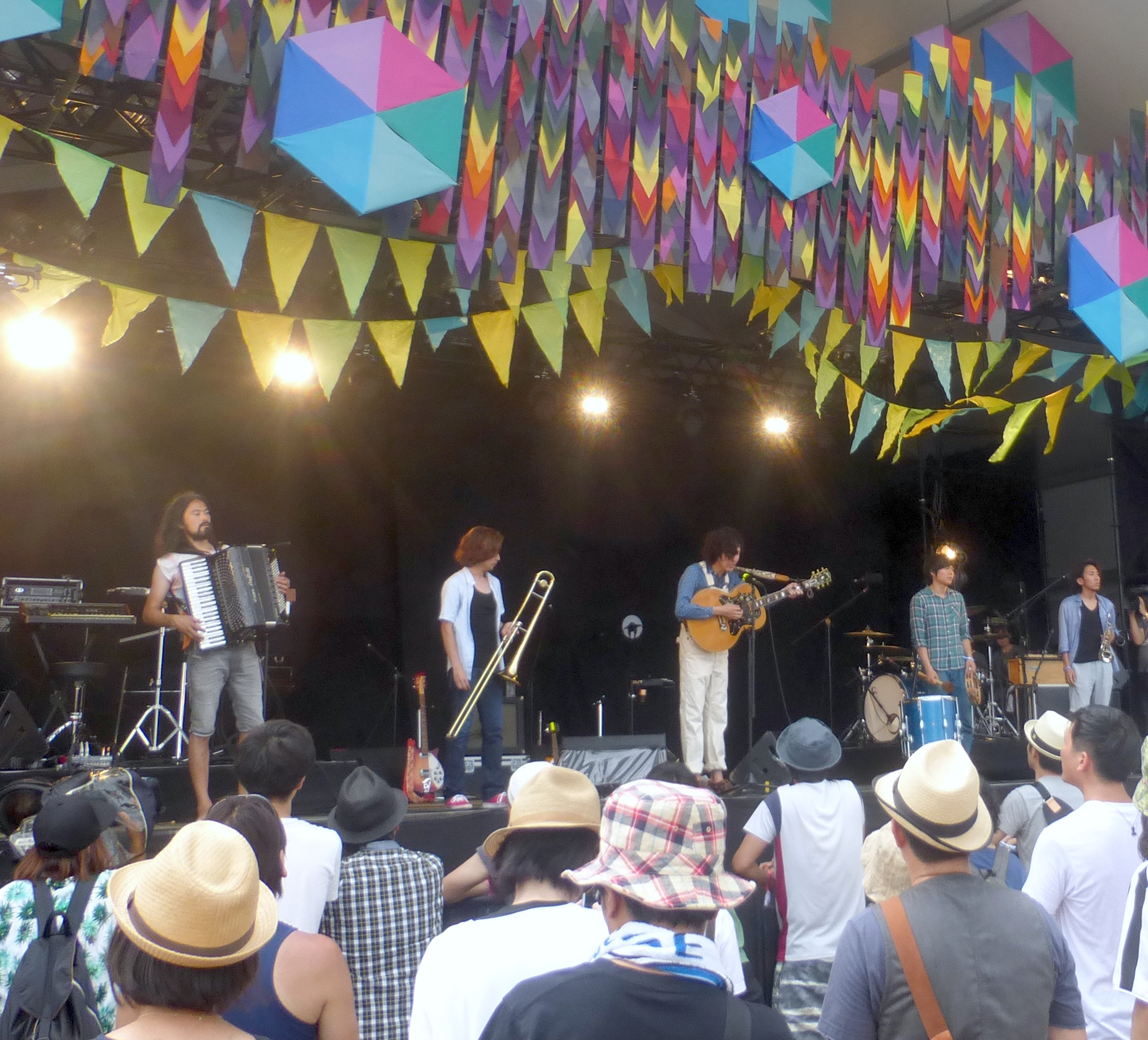
- Roth Bart Baron performing on the Garden Stage at Tokyo Summer Sonic Festival in 2015

Background information
- Origin: Tokyo
- Genres: Indie rock; Folk music; Alternative rock
- Years active: 2008-present
- Labels: Space Shower Music, Felicity
- Members: Masaya Mifune
- Past members: Tetsuya Nakahara
- Website: rothbartbaron.com

ROTH BART BARON (ロット・バルト・バロン) is a Tokyo-based musical project formed in 2008 with Masaya Mifune (vocal, guitar) and Tetsuya Nakahara (drums) but is currently a solo project headed by Mifune. The band has released three EPs and six full-length albums along with one live album. The group also composed and recorded the soundtrack for the Japanese film My Small Land.

== Biography ==
Masaya Mifune and Tetsuya Nakahara met in junior high school when they were partnered up to play tennis doubles. They started the band in university and, in the beginning, spent most of the time rehearsing and home recording. The band's name, ROTH BART BARON, comes from the antagonist von Rothbart in Tchaikovsky's The Swan Lake. Mifune played the role in kindergarten which left a strong impression on him being the only antagonist at that time.

The band self-released three works including the EP "ROTH BART BARON"(2010), the five-track EP "Monster Mountain and Choirboys" (13 December 2012) and "Chocolate Demo" (21 September 2012). Songs from these early works, especially those in "Monster Mountain and Choirboys" are still often performed on shows.

ROTH BART BARON signed to Felicity and released their first full album ROTH BART BARON's THE ICE AGE in 2014. The album was recorded in Philadelphia with Jonathan Low and Brian McTear.

A second album, ATOM. was released in 2015. The recording was done at Hotel2Tango in Montreal. The music video for the lead track, "bIg HOPe" was filmed with 360/ VR cameras.

In 2017, Roth Bart Barons started a crowdfunding project on Campfire for EP and music video production in UK. With the success of the funding, the band took a short stay in London and worked with Bradley Spence for the EP.

The "Atom (UK Mix)" video, as part of the project, was filmed near Brighton with the German photographer Julia Schönstädt.

On July 6, 2020, Masaya and Tetsuya announced that Tetsuya would be leaving the band.

In 2022, Mifune Masaya of ROTH BART BARON was featured on the song "You to You" by Asian Kung-Fu Generation which later appeared on Asian Kung-Fu Generation's album Planet Folks.

In 2023, the song BLOW was released in collaboration with the Thai indie-pop band Safeplanet, as well as a new album titled 8.

== Live Performances ==
=== Tours ===
- ROTH BART BARON'S THE ICE AGE release tour 2014
- ROTH BART BARON'S THE ICE AGE release tour in North America 2014
- ATOM Tour 2015~2016 in Japan
- ASIA TOUR 2016 (18 June, Shanghai; 19 June, Beijing; 26 June, Gachuurt, 28 June, Taipei)
- HEX TOUR 2018-2019 in Japan
- The Name of the Beast TOUR 2019-2020 in Japan and Taiwan
- Loud Color(s)& Silence Festival TOUR 2020-2021 in Japan
- HAKU's Resurrection TOUR 2021-2022 in Japan
- HOWL TOUR 2022-2023 in Japan

=== Festivals ===
- Summer Sonic 2015
- Big Mountain Music Festival 2015
- Play Time Festival 2016
- Fuji Rock Festival '16
- Rising Sun Rock Festival in Ezo '17

== Members ==
- Mifune Masaya (三船雅也) - vocal, writer, guitar, bass, piano, electronics

== Discography ==
=== Albums ===
Title	Release date	Label	Notes
ROTH BART BARON'S THE ICE AGE	April 16, 2014	Felicity	
ATOM	October 21, 2015	Felicity	Ranked 222nd on the Oricon Albums Chart
HEX	November 7, 2018	Felicity	
The Name of the Beasts	November 6, 2019	Felicity	
Loud Color(s) & Silence Festival	October 14, 2020	Space Shower Music	
The Name of the Beasts Tour Final - Live at Meguro Persimmon Hall	April 14, 2021	Space Shower Music	A live album from the band's performance at Meguro Persimmon Hall
HAKU's Resurrection	November 24, 2021	Space Shower Music	
My Small Land (Original Motion Picture Soundtrack)	April 27, 2022	Space Shower Music	The soundtrack to the Japanese Film "My Small Land"
HOWL	November 9, 2022	Space Shower Music	
8	October 18, 2023	Space Shower Music	

=== EPs ===
Title	Release date	Label
ROTH BART BARON	October 15, 2010	Self-Released
MONSTER MOUNTAIN AND CHOIRBOYS	December 13, 2012	Self-Released

=== Demos ===
Tile	Release date	Label
Chocolate	September 20, 2012	Self-Released
