= Suchmos =

Japanese rock band

- Origin: Kanagawa, Japan
- Genres: Rock; jazz; Acid jazz; hip hop
- Years active: 2013–2021, 2024-
- Labels: Space Shower Music (2015–2017); F.C.L.S. (Ki/oon Music) (2017–present)
- Members: Yonce (Vocals); Taiking (Guitar); OK (Drums); Kcee (DJ); Taihei (Keyboards)
- Past members: Ayustat (Guitar); Hsu (Bass)
- Website: suchmos.com

Suchmos is a Japanese rock group formed in 2013. Suchmos was inspired by African-American music such as rock, jazz, and hip-hop. The band's name, Suchmos, is adapted from a jazz musician Louis Armstrong’s nickname, “Satchmo”.

== History ==
=== 2013: Formation and earlier days ===
Yonce, Taiking, Hsu, OK, Kcee, and Taihei were playmates. OK and Kcee are brothers. OK, Taiking, and Hsu are childhood friends from elementary school. Kcee and Yonce are acquaintances from high school days; Taihei is Hsu's junior at college. They gathered at OK's and Kcee's house at night and watching YouTube, singing, dancing, and playing.

In January 2013, OK formed Suchmos with Yonce, Hsu, Ayustat, and a support member, Taihei. Kcee accompanied the band as a video group. The band's name, Suchmos, comes from a jazz musician Louis Armstrong’s nickname, “Satchmo”. The first live appearance was decided prior to deciding the band's name. While Yonce was suffering at the rehearsal studio of Tokyo University at that time, pictures of Armstrong flowed to the monitor there. Hsu who was studying jazz music saw it and said that Louis Armstrong is "Satchmo". They liked the sound and adopted it as the band's name.

=== 2014–2016: The Bay ===
On April 8, 2015, Space Shower Music released the band's debut EP Essence. From this work, the music video of "Fallin" which directed by Kcee was released. In the same year, the guitarist Ayustat left the band, then Kcee and Taiking joined as new members. Taihei who was a support member became an official member.

On July 8, 2015, the band's first studio album The Bay was released. It peaked at 26th on the Oricon weekly chart and 16th on Billboard Japan Top Albums. The lead single "YMM" from the album peaked at 44th on Billboard Japan Hot 100 and 2nd on J-Wave Tokio Hot 100. In December 2015, they won Best New Artist for the annual feature project "Apple Music Best of 2015". On December 12, 2015, their first independent event "Suchmos the Blow Your Mind vol.1" was held at Roppongi Super Deluxe. It is a voluntary event which was held regularly by inviting artists respected by Suchmos. Sol & Pimp Sessions appeared as the first guest.

On January 17, 2016, they released the second EP Love&Vice. It reached Top 15th on the Oricon chart, and peaked at 1st on the iTunes General Album chart. The EP's lead song "Stay Tune" won the first place at J-Wave Tokio Hot 100. In September 2016, it was used as a commercial song of Honda Motor's compact SUV "Vezel". On the Billboard Japan Hot 100, it reached the top ten rankings, played the first major music chart top 10 through albums and singles.

From April 2 to April 23, 2016, their first nationwide live tour Tour Love&Vice was held. On July 6, 2016, they released the third EP Mint Condition. The music video of lead song "Mint" (directed by maxilla) was produced collaborating with Levi's and won The Best New Artist Video of the 15th MTV Video Music Awards Japan. The song "Mint" peaked at 16th on Billboard Japan Hot 100.

From October 16 to October 29, 2016, the band's first one-man tour Tour Mint Condition was held. An additional performance entitled Tour Mint Condition Extra Show was held on November 11, 2016.

=== 2017–2020: The Kids, The Ashtray, and The Anymal ===
On January 25, 2017, Suchmos released their second studio album The Kids. On Billboard Japan Top Albums Sales chart, it peaked at the second place. Through a single album, they reached the first Oricon chart Top 3 entry.

In March 2017, they participated in Petroz's tribute album Where, Who, What Is Petrolz? and covered "Rain".

On June 20, 2018, they released their first mini-album The Ashtray featuring the lead single 808.

On March 27, 2019, they released their third studio album The Anymal, an album showcasing their biggest musical change in direction since their formation.

=== 2021–present: Indefinite hiatus and return ===
On February 3, 2021, it was announced that the band will be on hiatus indefinitely after discussion among band and staff members. On October 15, 2021, it was announced that their bassist, HSU, had died.

Suchmos announced teased a return on October 4, 2024, officially announcing their reunion on October 7 with their first show back in Yokohama Stadium in June 2025. The band released the Sunburst EP on July 2, 2025, their first new music in 6 years. They headlined the first night of Fuji Rock Festival on July 25.

== Musical style ==
Suchmos' music includes elements such as rock, soul, jazz, hip-hop and so on. Former editor-in-chief of Tower Record's free paper "bounce", Daisaku Nishio points out that Suchmos's music has a great influence from black music such as 1970s soul and funk, acid jazz, and 1990s R&B. They are digesting the influences from various genres of jazz, alternative rock, hip-hop, neo soul, and the current Western music scene.

== Band members ==
Current members

- Yonce (Kasai Yosuke, born August 29, 1991) — vocals (2013–present)
- Taiking (Totsuka Taiki, born May 1990) — guitar (2015–present)
- OK (Ohara Kento, Kcee's brother, born August 27, 1990) — drums, DJ (2013–present)
- Kcee (Ohara Kaiki, born September 18, 1992) — DJ (2015–present)
- Taihei (Sakurauchi Taihei, born July 1992) — keyboards (2013–present)

Former members

- Ayustat — guitar (2013–2015)
- Hsu (Kosugi Hayata, born 1989) — bass (2013–2021)

== Discography ==
=== Studio albums ===
| Year | Title | Peak charts | | | Sales |
| Year | Title | Oricon | Billboard Japan Top Album | TWN East Asia | Sales |
|---|---|---|---|---|---|
| 2015 | The Bay: 1st studio album; Released: July 8, 2015; Label: Space Shower Music | 26 | 16 | | JPN: 76,126 |
| 2017 | The Kids: 2nd studio album; Released: January 25, 2017; Label: Space Shower Music | 2 | 1 | | JPN: 157,211 |
| 2018 | The Ashtray: 3rd studio album; Released: June 20, 2018; Label: F.C.L.S. | 2 | 2 | | |
| 2019 | The Anymal: 4th studio album; Released: March 27, 2019; Label: F.C.L.S. | 4 | 2 | 1 | JPN: 19,729 |

=== EPs ===
| Year | Title | Peak charts |
| Year | Title | Oricon |
|---|---|---|
| 2014 | Essence: Released: April 8, 2014; Label: Space Shower Music | 84 |
| 2016 | Love&Vice: Released: January 27, 2015; Label: Space Shower Music | 15 |
| 2016 | Mint Condition: Released: July 6, 2016; Label: Space Shower Music | 14 |
| 2025 | Sunburst: Released: July 2, 2025; Label: F.C.L.S. | 8 |

== Awards ==
| Year | Nominee / work | Award | Result |
|---|---|---|---|
| 2015 | Suchmos | Apple Music Best of 2015 — Best New Artist | Won |
| 2016 | The Bay | CD Shop Awards — 関東ブロック賞 (Kanto Block Prize) | Won |
| 2016 | Mint | MTV Video Music Awards Japan — Best New Artist Video | Won |
| 2017 | Suchmos | Space Shower Music AWARDS — Best Breakthrough Artist | Won |
