= Hanashi wa Sorekara da =

Studio album by Marie Ueda
- Released: 25 February 2015
- Recorded: 2014–2015
- Genre: Japanese pop
- Length: 50 minutes
- Label: Giza Studio
- Producer: Marie Ueda

Marie Ueda chronology
Hanashi wa Sorekara da (2015)	Lonely Night Magic Spell (2016)

Singles from Lonely Night Magic Spell
- 1. "Kare ni Mamotte Hoshii 10 no Koto" Released: 6 August 2014; 2. "Zakuro no Mi" Released: 19 November 2014

Music video
- "植田真梨恵 アルバム 『はなしはそれからだ』 全曲試聴" on YouTube

Hanashi wa Sorekara da (はなしはそれからだ) is the debut studio album by Japanese singer-songwriter Marie Ueda. It was released on 25 February 2015 under Giza Studio label.

== Background ==
The album includes previous 2 released singles, Kare ni Mamotte Hoshii 10 no Koto and Zakura no Mi. Some tracks of album, like "a girl" was composed during her indies times. The lead track of the album is "Friday". It was released in two formats: regular CD edition with 13 tracks included in and CD+DVD edition which includes music videoclips from years 2010 until 2014.

== Charting ==
The album reached #45 rank first week. Album charted for 2 weeks.

== Track listing ==
All songs are written and composed by Marie Ueda.

No.	Title	Arranger(s)	Length
1.	"Intro (instrumental)"		1:14
2.	"Friday"	Isse no se	3:40
3.	"Kare ni Mamotte Hoshii Juu no Koto" (彼に守ってほしい10のこと)	Isse no se	3:52
4.	"Hanamoge"	Hiroshi Asai (ex.The Tambourines)	3:10
5.	"Shihaisha" (支配者)	Hiroshi Asai	4:25
6.	"Mukashi no Hanashi" (昔の話)	Marie Ueda	3:48
7.	"A girl"	Isse no se	1:11
8.	"Please plase"	Isse no se	3:49
9.	"Paste"	Hiroshi Asai	4:02
10.	"Zakuro no Mi" (ザクロの実)	Isse no se	3:34
11.	"Naitenai" (泣いてない)	Akihito Tokunaga (Doa)	3:36
12.	"Calca telepathy"	Isse no se	4:47
13.	"Sayonara no Kawari ni Kioku wo Keshita" (さよならのかわりに記憶を消した)	Marie Ueda	5:55

== In media ==
- Kare ni Mamotte Hoshii Juu no koto: as playable song for smartphone game Show By Rock!!
- Friday: as theme song for Ezaki Glico's Collon
