= Heartbreaker (Marie Ueda album) =

Studio album by Marie Ueda
- Released: 26 August 2020
- Recorded: 2019–2020
- Genre: J-pop
- Label: Giza
- Producer: Marie Ueda

Marie Ueda chronology
| W.A.H. (2019) | Heartbreaker (2020) |

Singles from Heartbreaker
- 1. "Revolver" Released: 8 August 2017; 2. "Stranger" Released: 1 October 2019; 3. "What's" Released: 1 May 2020; 4. "I Just Wanna Be A Star" Released: 1 May 2020

Heartbreaker (ハートブレイカー) is the third original album by J-pop singer-songwriter Marie Ueda. It was released on 26 August 2020 under the Giza Studio label. It includes the singles "Revolver", "I Just Wanna Be a Star", "Stranger" and "What's".

== Background ==
The album consists of 17 songs, which makes it the longest album in Ueda's career. It's also the first album which includes lyrics and music from other people. Various veteran musicians from Being, such as Akihito Tokunaga, Daria Kawashima and Aika Ohno were involved in the music production.

The album was released in two editions, regular CD and limited CD+DVD. The DVD consisted of music video clips from the years 2016–2020. This is Ueda's first original album to be released in three years and eight months.

== Promotion ==
"Revolver" was used as an intro song to the television variety program Bebop Higheel. The song was released as a single on 8 August 2017.

The digital single "Stranger" was released on 1 October 2019. Later that year, it was announced that it would serve as an anniversary campaign song for the department store Flags in Fukuoka.

The digital single "What's" was released on 1 May 2020. It was announced that it would serve as a theme song to the movie Missis Noisy. While the movie was postponed due to worldwide pandemic (originally scheduled to premiere in May 2020), the digital single was released according to the schedule. The song was composed after the one-night live Palpable Babble Live in 2019.

"I Just Wanna Be a Star" was produced along with the music video clip within the span of 25 hours during the YouTube live broadcast in November 2019. Several months later, in April 2020 was announced the song promotion in the television drama Peanut Butter Sandwich and released as a digital single on 1 May 2020.

Digital single "Niji ga Kakaru Kara" and movie insert song "Go to the Sun" remain unreleased from the album recordings.

== Track listing ==
All lyrics are written by Marie Ueda; all music is composed by Marie Ueda.

| No. | Title | Lyrics | Music | Arranger(s) | Length |
|---|---|---|---|---|---|
| 1. | "Heart Breaker" | Marie Ueda | Ueda | Soshiranu | 4:32 |
| 2. | "What's" | Ueda | Ueda | Akihito Tokunaga | 4:35 |
| 3. | "Mazeruna Kiken(まぜるなきけん)" | Ueda | Tokunaga | Tokunaga | 3:36 |
| 4. | "Black Cherry in the Dirty Forest" | Ueda | Ueda | Soshiranu | 5:19 |
| 5. | "Stranger" | Ueda | Ueda | Soshiranu | 4:17 |
| 6. | "Chiisana Koi no Chikai(小さな恋の誓い)" | Ueda | Yūzō Ōkusu (Sensation) | Ōkusu | 3:09 |
| 7. | "Nemurenu Yoru Ni (眠れぬ夜に)" | Ueda | Aika Ohno | Ohno, Hiroshi Asai (Sensation) | 2:51 |
| 8. | "Kagiana (鍵穴)" | Ueda | Joe daisque | Daisque | 5:13 |
| 9. | "Through (スルー)" | Ueda | Ueda | Nagura Manabu | 4:45 |
| 10. | "My Little Bunny" | Ueda | Daria Kawashima | Isse no Se | 3:33 |
| 11. | "Revolver" | Ueda | Ueda | Ken Okazaki | 3:04 |
| 12. | "Vanila Fake(バニラフェイク)" | Soshiranu | Soshiranu | Soshiranu | 2:20 |
| 13. | "I Just Wanna Be a Star" | Ueda | Ueda | Isse no Se | 3:33 |
| 14. | "IN TO" | Ueda | Ueda | Soshiranu | 3:25 |
| 15. | "Te to Te Me to Me(てとてとめとめ)" | Ueda | Ueda | Ueda, Mai Ueda | 2:37 |
| 16. | "Ureubeki(憂うべき)" | Ueda | Takuto Unigame | Unigame | 4:53 |
| 17. | "Error" | Ueda | Ueda | Ueda | 3:53 |

== Personnel ==
Credits adapted from album booklet.

- Marie Ueda – vocals (all), piano, arrange (17), music & lyrics (1–2, 4–5, 9, 11, 14–15, 17)
- Hirofumi Nishimura – piano, organ (1, 8, 9, 10, 13, 15)
- Akihito Tokunaga – bass, guitar, chorus, arrange, music, programming (2, 3)
- Hiroshi Asai – bass, programming (1, 7, 9, 10, 13)
- Keisuke Kurumatani (Sensation) – drums (1, 8, 9, 10, 11, 13, 15)
- Kei (ex. Magenta Blue) – guitar, chorus (6, 7)
- Daria Kawashima – chorus, music (10)
- Aika Ohno – chorus, music, arrange (7)
- Yūzō Ōkusu – chorus, music, programming, arrange (6)
- Soshiranu – arrange, programming, music, lyrics (1, 4, 5, 12, 15)
- Kenta Watanabe – guitar (1, 9, 13)
- Joe Daisque – poem, music, arrange, guitar, programming (8)
- Kazuya Yoshii (The Yellow Monkey) – poetry reading (8)
- Mai Ueda – acoustic guitar, chorus (14)

== Charts ==
Chart performance of Heartbreaker
| Chart (2020) | Peak position |
|---|---|
| Japan Hot Albums (Billboard Japan) | 51 |
| Japanese Albums (Oricon) | 34 |
