= Lonely Night Magic Spell =

Studio album by Marie Ueda
- Released: 14 December 2016
- Recorded: 2015–2016
- Genre: Japanese pop
- Length: 49:00
- Label: Giza Studio
- Producer: Marie Ueda

Marie Ueda chronology
Hanashi wa Sorekara da (2015)	Lonely Night Magic Spell (2016)	F.A.R (2019)

Singles from Lonely Night Magic Spell
- 1. "Wakannai no wa Iyada" Released: 12 August 2015; 2. "Spectacle" Released: 20 January 2016; 3. "Furetara Kieteshimau" Released: 4 July 2016; 4. "Yume no Parade" Released: 12 October 2016

Music video
- "植田真梨恵 AL 『ロンリーナイト マジックスペル』 全曲試聴" on YouTube

Lonely Night Magic Spell (ロンリーナイト マジックスペル) is the second studio album by Japanese pop singer-songwriter Marie Ueda. It was released on 14 December 2016 under the Giza studio label.

== Background ==
It was released one and half year later after her debut album Hanashi wa Sorekara da.

Theme of album is "dream", which was inspired of own experience from her childhood times.

The album was released in two formats: CD and limited CD+DVD edition. The first press edition includes DVD with music clips from 2015 till 2016.

== Promotion ==
=== Singles ===
This album consist of previously singles released between 2015 and 2016.

The single Wakannai no wa Iyada was released on 12 August 2015. The single served as an ending theme for TBS music television program Count Down TV and for local station TV Kanazawa's program Tonari no TV Kan-chan. It was also usable in the music software game Show by Rock!!. It debuted at number 35 on Oricon Single Weekly Charts.

The single Spectacle was released on 20 January 2016 and served as a power-play song for NTV music television program Buzzrhythm. As of 2019, it's Ueda's only single to debut at number 20 on Oricon Single Weekly Charts.

The single Furetara Kieteshimau was released on 4 July 2016 and it served as ending theme for AbemaTV streaming program Minomonta no Buzz!, music software game Show by Rock!! it also serves as a playable song. It debuted at number 32 on Oricon Single Weekly Charts.

Yume no Parade was released on 12 October 2016 and served as an opening theme for TV Asahi music program Musicalu. It debuted at number 28 on Oricon Single Weekly Charts.

=== Other songs ===
The album track Dining was released as a lead promotional song on YouTube with official music videoclip two weeks before the album release. It was performed live in various Japanese music programs such as a Melodix Premium, Buzzrhythm and Abema TV as part of album promotion.

== Charting performance ==
The album debuted at number 17 on the Oricon Album Daily Charts and number 30 on the Oricon Album Weekly charts.

== Track listing ==
All songs are written and composed by Marie Ueda

No.	Title	Arranger(s)	Length
1.	"Intro (instrumental)"	soshiranu	0:58
2.	"Wakannai no wa Iyada" (わかんないのはいやだ)	Akihito Tokunaga (Doa)	2:49
3.	"WHO R U ?"	Isse no se	3:12
4.	"Warui Yume" (悪い夢)	Isse no se	4:05
5.	"Dining" (ダイニング)	Joe Daisque	5:12
6.	"I was Dreamin’ C U Darlin’"	Takeo Hirose	3:28
7.	"Paella" (パエリア)	Daisque	4:35
8.	"Yume no Parade" (夢のパレード)	Tokunaga	3:42
9.	"Boku no Yume" (僕の夢)	Hirofumi Nishimura	4:39
10.	"Furetara Kieteshimau" (ふれたら消えてしまう)	Ken Okazaki	4:00
11.	"Spectacle" (スペクタクル)	Isse no se	4:01
12.	"Journey"	Hiroshi Asai (Sensation)	4:01
13.	"Inu wa Inugoya ni Kaeru" (犬は犬小屋に帰る)	Isse no se	3:46
