= W.A.H. (album) =

EP by Marie Ueda
- Released: April 17, 2019
- Recorded: 2017–2019
- Genre: J-pop
- Label: Giza
- Producer: Marie Ueda

Marie Ueda chronology
F.A.R. (2019)	W.A.H. (2019)	Heartbreaker (2020)

Singles from W.A.H.
- 1. "Tomoshibi" Released: 25 May 2017; 2. "Wasurena ni Kuchizuke" Released: 25 July 2018; 3. "Bloomin'" Released: 13 March 2019

W.A.H. is the fifth mini album by J-pop singer-songwriter Marie Ueda. It released on April 17, 2019 under the Giza Studio label.

== Background ==
The album was released in two editions, regular CD and limited CD+DVD. DVD will consist of live footage Utautau Vol.3 with 14 tracks. This is Ueda's first album which was released in the shortest time.

The concept of the album is "Japonism".

== Promotion ==
The promotional and lead digital single, "Bloomin'" released on March 13. On 28 March, it was announced that it will serve as an ending song on April in TBS music television program Count Down TV. The song was composed after the release of F.A.R, on February.

Wasurena ni Kuchizuke was used as a commercial song for Choya's summer drink Natsu Ume. Television broadcast of the commercial was published online on May 15, 2018. The song was released as a single on July 25, 2018.

Tomoshibi was used as a theme song for the movie Tomoshibi: Choshi Dentesu 6.4km no Kiseki., in the movie Ueda was playing a minor role. On May 25, 2017 it was released as a digital single and on the same day the music videoclip was published on the Creek and River movie company's official YouTube channel.

Nagai Yoru was used as a commercial song for furniture company Sansyodo campaign Anata de Iru. On August 25, 2018, the commercial video was uploaded on Sansyodo official YouTube channel. Marie composed this song when she was 19 years old. Nagai Yoru wasn't released before as a single, it will be recorded as the song for the first time in this album.

On 1 May, was announced media promotion of album track Hinemosu as a power push song for local TV Aichi television program A-NN.

== Charting performance ==
The album debuted at number 18 on the Oricon Album Daily Charts. The album debuted at number 33 on the Oricon Album Weekly Charts and charted for two weeks.

== Track listing ==
All lyrics are written by Marie Ueda; all music is composed by Marie Ueda.

No.	Title	Arranger(s)	Length
1.	"Entrance"	Marie Ueda	1:36
2.	"Bloomin'"	Hirofumi Nishimura	4:31
3.	"Wasurena ni Kuchizuke (勿忘にくちづけ)"	Ueda	3:46
4.	"Hana Katsura (花鬘)"		4:40
5.	"Tomoshibi (灯)"	Hiroshi Asai (Sensation)	3:16
6.	"Nagai Yoru (長い夜)"	Nishimura	5:09
7.	"Hinemosu (ひねもす)"	Joe daisque	3:33

== Personnel ==
Credits adapted from the Official Website.

- Marie Ueda - vocals, songwriting
- Hirofumi Nishimura - piano, arrange, programming
- Akihito Tokunaga - bass
- Keisuke Kurumatani (Sensation) - drums
- Seiichiro Iwai (ex. U-ka Saegusa in dB) - acoustic guitar
