= Tempalay =

Japanese band

- Origin: Tokyo, Japan
- Genres: Indie rock; psychedelic pop
- Years active: 2014—present
- Labels: P-Vine Records, Space Shower Music
- Members: Ryōto Ohara; Natsuki Fujimoto; Aaamyyy
- Past members: Yūya Takeuchi
- Website: tempalay.jp

Tempalay (Japanese: テンパレイ, Hepburn: Temparei) is a Japanese lo-fi psychedelic pop band that formed in 2014.

== Biography ==
Tempalay was formed in 2014, when Ryōto Ohara and Yūya Takeuchi met drummer Natsuki Fujimoto in Tokyo. The band's vocalist Ryōto Ohara, originally from Kōchi Prefecture, had moved to Saitama to pursue a career in music in 2011, and started making music with drummer Yūya Takeuchi, who he met in a bar. After forming at the Fuji Rock Festival's "Rookie a Go-Go" stage in 2015, the band released their debut extended play Instant Hawaii through P-Vine Records.

From 2015, Aaamyyy from the band Eimie began working as a live support member of the band, performing background vocals and on the synthesizer. The group released their debut album From Japan in 2016.

In June 2018, Yūya Takeuchi announced he was leaving the band due to creative differences, however staying on as a live support member for their upcoming concerts. The next month, Aaamyyy was announced as an official member of Tempalay. The band released their third album With Love from the 21st Century in June 2019, which became their most commercially successful album to date in Japan.

Tempalay has toured China and the United States, including the South by Southwest festival in 2016.

== Members ==
- Ryōto Ohara (小原 綾斗, Ohara Ryōto) — Lead vocals, guitars, songwriter (since 2014)
- Natsuki Fujimoto (藤本 夏樹, Fujimoto Natsuki) — Drums, percussion (since 2014)
  - He also performs as a soloist under the name John Natsuki. In August 2018, Fujimoto married traditional ink wash painter Chinpan.
- Honami "Aaamyyy" Furuhara (古原 ほなみ, Furuhara Honami) — Synthesizers, keybass, bass pedals, background vocals, occasional songwriter (since 2015)
  - She also releases electronic music as a soloist. She became a permanent member of the band in July 2018.

=== Past members ===
- Yūya Takeuchi (竹内 祐也, Takeuchi Yūya) — Bass (2014–2018)

== Discography ==
=== Studio albums ===
List of albums, with selected chart positions
Title	Album details	Peak positions	
Title	Album details	JPN Oricon	JPN Billboard (Note: Sources for chart positions are as follows: With Love from the 21st Century; From Japan 3:)
From Japan (フロム・ジャパン, Furomu Japan)	Released: January 6, 2016; Label: P-Vine Records; Formats: CD, LP, digital download	—	—
From Japan 2 (フロム・ジャパン2, Furomu Japan Tsū)	Released: August 30, 2017; Label: P-Vine; Formats: CD, LP, digital download	90	— (Note: Charted at number 85 on the physical Top Albums Sales chart.)
With Love from the 21st Century (21世紀より愛をこめて, Nijūisseki Yori Ai o Komete)	Released: June 5, 2019; Label: Space Shower Music; Formats: CD, digital download	30	37
Ghost Album (ゴーストアルバム, Gōsuto Arubamu)	Released: March 24, 2021; Label: Warner Music Japan; Formats: CD, digital download	17	—
From Japan 3 (フロム・ジャパン3, Furomu Japan Suri)	Released: October 12, 2022; Label: Warner Music Japan; Formats: CD, digital download	14	12
Ika	Released: May 1, 2024; Label: Warner Music Japan; Formats: CD, digital download	8	—
"—" denotes items which did not chart, or charted on a Billboard sub-chart.

=== Extended plays ===
List of extended plays, with selected chart positions
Title	Album details	Peak positions	
Title	Album details	JPN Oricon	JPN Billboard
Summer Time	Released: October 18, 2014; Label: Self-produced; Formats: CD	—	—
Instant Hawaii	Released: October 14, 2015; Label: P-Vine; Formats: CD, digital download	—	—
Gokyoku (5曲; "5 Songs")	Released: February 15, 2017; Label: P-Vine; Formats: CD, digital download	165	—
What a Wonderful World (なんて素晴らしき世界, Nante Subarashiki Sekai)	Released: September 26, 2018; Label: Space Shower; Formats: CD, digital download	109	— (Note: Charted at number 96 on the physical Top Albums Sales chart, and number 94 on the Download Albums chart.)
Naked 4 Satan	Released: August 27, 2025; Label: Space Shower; Formats: CD, digital download	27	—
"—" denotes items which did not chart, or charted on a Billboard sub-chart.

=== Singles ===
Title	Year	Album
"Kakumei Zenya" (革命前夜; "Night Before the Revolution")	2017	From Japan 2

==== Promotional singles ====
Title	Year	Album
"Made in Japan"	2015	From Japan
"Joe"	2016	Non-album single
"New York City"	2017	Gokyoku
"Shinsedai" (新世代; "New Era")	2017	Made in Japan 2
"Doooshiyoooo!!" (どうしよう; "What to Do")	2018	What a Wonderful World
"Sonic Wave"	2018	What a Wonderful World
"Be Absorbed, and Shake." (のめりこめ、震えろ。, Nomerikome, Furuero.)	2019	With Love from the 21st Century
