= Space Shower TV =

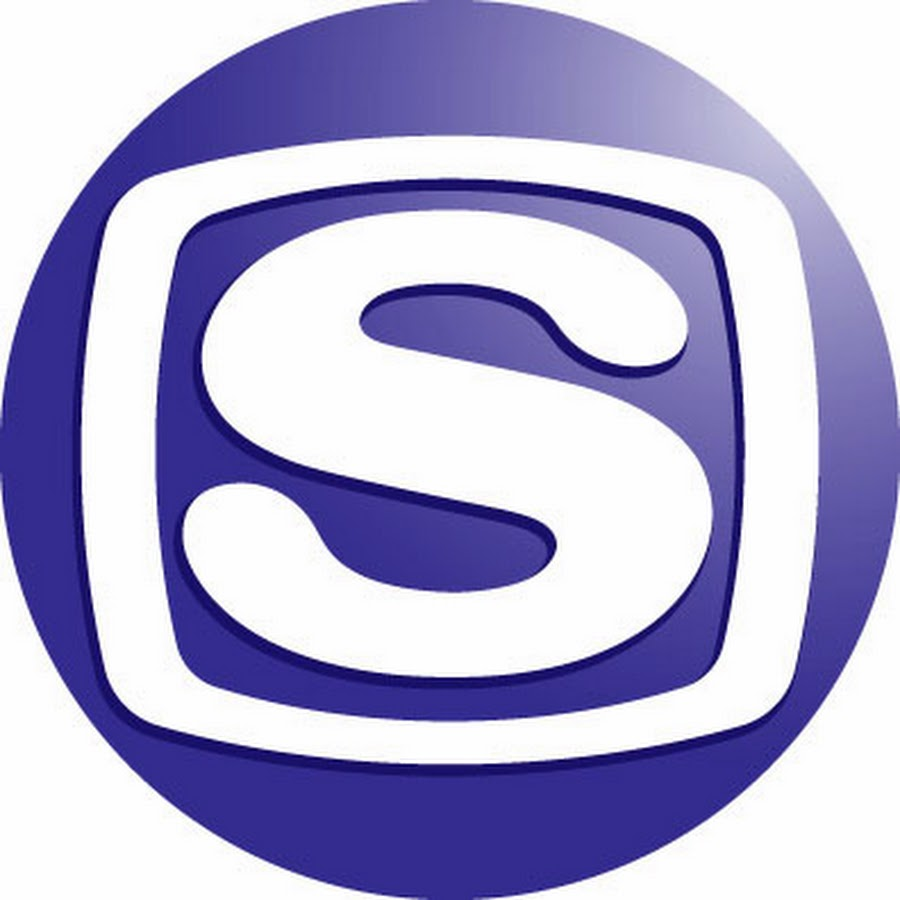
- Type: Pay television channel
- Country: Japan
- Headquarters: Minato, Tokyo

Programming
- Language(s): Japanese
- Picture format: HDTV 1080i

Ownership
- Owner: Space Shower Networks, Inc.

History
- Launched: December 1, 1989

Links
- Website: https://www.spaceshowertv.com/

Space Shower TV (スペースシャワーTV) is a Japanese music television channel operated by Space Shower Networks, Inc. The company is headquartered in Minato, Tokyo. The channel launched at 6:00 on December 1, 1989. Initially limited to cable viewers, it began broadcasting using Japanese communication satellites in mid-1992.

The idea behind establishing Space Shower TV was to create a specialized music channel like MTV in Japan. The purpose was to make it a strictly music channel providing quality content that would meet the standards of a true music fan.

Its programming line-up in 1992 include a mix of Japanese, Western and ethnic pop music programs such as Bum Television, Wild Side and Booing.

== See also ==
- Space Shower Music Video Awards
- Space Shower Music
