= List of 2019 box office number-one films in Japan =

The following is a list of 2019 box office number-one films in Japan by week. When the number-one film in gross is not the same as the number-one film in admissions, both are listed.

== Number-one film ==
†	This implies the highest-grossing movie of the year.

Week #	Date	Film	Gross	Notes
1	January 6, 2019	Bohemian Rhapsody	US$2,965,761	
2	January 13, 2019	Bohemian Rhapsody	US$3,513,069	
3	January 20, 2019	Masquerade Hotel	US$5,768,949	
4	January 27, 2019	Masquerade Hotel	US$4,362,722	
5	February 3, 2019	Whistleblower	US$3,053,625	
6	February 10, 2019	Aquaman	US$2,864,383	
7	February 17, 2019	Aquaman	US$1,773,959	
8	February 24, 2019	Alita: Battle Angel	US$3,124,941	
9	March 3, 2019	Doraemon: Nobita's Chronicle of the Moon Exploration	US$6,217,594	
10	March 10, 2019	Doraemon: Nobita's Chronicle of the Moon Exploration	US$5,505,502	
11	March 17, 2019	Doraemon: Nobita's Chronicle of the Moon Exploration	US$3,926,166	
12	March 24, 2019	Doraemon: Nobita's Chronicle of the Moon Exploration	US$2,827,017	
13	March 31, 2019	Doraemon: Nobita's Chronicle of the Moon Exploration	US$2,920,469	
14	April 7, 2019	Doraemon: Nobita's Chronicle of the Moon Exploration	US$1,563,967	
15	April 14, 2019	Detective Conan: The Fist of Blue Sapphire	US$13,067,176	
16	April 21, 2019	Detective Conan: The Fist of Blue Sapphire	US$7,917,281	
17	April 28, 2019	Avengers: Endgame	—	
18	May 5, 2019	Detective Conan: The Fist of Blue Sapphire	US$5,284,442	
19	May 12, 2019	Avengers: Endgame	US$2,874,304	
20	May 19, 2019	The Confidence Man JP	US$3,503,180	
21	May 26, 2019	The Confidence Man JP	US$3,211,057	
22	June 2, 2019	Godzilla: King of the Monsters	US$6,251,316	
23	June 9, 2019	Aladdin	US$10,374,556	
24	June 16, 2019	Aladdin	US$10,105,648	
25	June 23, 2019	Aladdin	US$9,608,251	
26	June 30, 2019	Aladdin	US$8,154,930	
27	July 7, 2019	Aladdin	US$6,442,465	
28	July 14, 2019	Toy Story 4	US$12,726,037	
29	July 21, 2019	Toy Story 4	US$7,939,218	
30	July 28, 2019	Weathering with You †	US$9,311,920	
31	August 4, 2019	Weathering with You †	US$6,737,343	
32	August 11, 2019	One Piece: Stampede	US$7,625,969	
33	August 18, 2019	The Lion King	US$5,902,790	
34	August 25, 2019	The Lion King	US$4,429,383	
35	September 1, 2019	Weathering with You †	US$3,919,640	
36	September 8, 2019	Weathering with You †	US$2,370,748	
37	September 15, 2019	Hit Me Anyone One More Time	US$4,233,539	
38	September 22, 2019	Hit Me Anyone One More Time	US$3,433,634	
39	September 29, 2019	Hit Me Anyone One More Time	US$2,289,274	
40	October 6, 2019	John Wick: Chapter 3 – Parabellum	US$1,672,306	
41	October 13, 2019	Joker	US$3,065,545	
42	October 20, 2019	Joker	US$3,259,357	
43	October 27, 2019	Joker	US$2,478,152	
44	November 3, 2019	It Chapter Two	US$3,300,000	
45	November 10, 2019	Terminator: Dark Fate	US$4,292,736	
46	November 17, 2019	Terminator: Dark Fate	US$2,731,029	
47	November 24, 2019	Frozen 2	US$17,876,067	
48	December 1, 2019	Frozen 2	US$13,188,432	
49	December 8, 2019	Frozen 2	US$9,514,175	
50	December 15, 2019	Frozen 2	US$7,132,848	
51	December 22, 2019	Star Wars: The Rise of Skywalker	US$14,342,261	
52	December 29, 2019	Star Wars: The Rise of Skywalker	US$6,095,974	

== Highest-grossing films ==
International film Japanese film

Highest-grossing films of 2019
Rank	Title	Gross
1	Weathering with You	¥14.06 billion ($128.98 million)
2	Frozen 2	¥12.79 billion ($117.33 million)
3	Aladdin	¥12.16 billion ($111.55 million)
4	Toy Story 4	¥10.09 billion ($92.56 million)
5	Detective Conan: The Fist of Blue Sapphire	¥9.37 billion ($85.96 million)
6	The Lion King	¥6.67 billion ($61.19 million)
7	Fantastic Beasts: The Crimes of Grindelwald	¥6.57 billion ($60.27 million)
8	Avengers: Endgame	¥6.12 billion ($56.14 million)
9	Kingdom	¥5.73 billion ($52.56 million)
10	One Piece: Stampede	¥5.55 billion ($50.91 million)

== See also ==
- List of Japanese films of 2019
