= F.A.R. (album) =

EP by Marie Ueda
- Released: February 20, 2019
- Recorded: 2018
- Genre: J-pop
- Label: Giza
- Producer: Marie Ueda

Marie Ueda chronology
Lonely Night Magic Spell (2016)	F.A.R. (2019)	W.A.H. (2019)

Singles from F.A.R
- 1. "FAR" Released: 16 January 2019

F.A.R is the fourth mini album by J-pop singer-songwriter Marie Ueda. It was released on February 20, 2019, under the Giza Studio label.

== Promotion ==
The album was released in two editions, regular CD and limited CD+DVD. DVD consists of live footage Tatta Hitotsu no One-man Live Vol.3: Good-bye Stereotype with 12 tracks and documentary. This is Ueda's first album work since 2016 and first mini-album since 2012. The promotional and lead single, "Far", was released on January 16, 2019.

Previously released recording CD Revolver is as of now unreleased in album recordings. Wasurena ni Kuchizuke and commercial song Nagai Yoru was published in mini album W.A.H.

Ichigo no Mi was originally produced during Marie's indies times and received a recording version for the first time.

In the song "Softly," which is dedicated to Marie and Lala, Marie describes the priceless time she spends with Lala. On 28 July, was uploaded on YouTube channel Home Labo commercial video to promote new campaign Ie Tsukuri-Utau Tsukuri by using album track Softly.

The concept of the album is "the growth in adulthood" with intersects of nostalgia and anxiety.

== Commercial performance ==
The album reached #26 on the Oricon Daily Album Charts. On Oricon Weekly Album Charts reached #47 rank.

== Track listing ==
All lyrics are written by Marie Ueda; all music is composed by Marie Ueda.

No.	Title	Arranger(s)	Length
1.	"FAR"	Akihito Tokunaga (doa)	5:35
2.	"Romantika (ロマンティカ)"	Hiroshi Asai (Sensation)	3:47
3.	"Private Time (プライベートタイム)"	Takeo Hirose	2:47
4.	"Sanagi kara Chou he (さなぎから蝶へ)"	Ken Okazaki	3:15
5.	"Ichigo no Mi (苺の実)"	Joe Daisque	4.46
6.	"Softly"	U-zo Ohkusu (Sensation)	3.47
7.	"Exit"	Marie Ueda	0:59

== Personnel ==
Credits adapted from the Official Website.

- Marie Ueda - vocals, songwriting
- Akihito Tokunaga - arrange, bass, keyboards, chorus, programming
- Daisuke Ikeda - strings arrange
- Keisuke Kurumatani (Sensation) - drums
- Seiichiro Iwai (formerly of U-ka Saegusa in dB) - guitar
- Hiroshi Asai - bass, arrange
- U-zo Ohkusu - keyboard, arrange
