= Aaamyyy =

Japanese electronic musician

- Also known as: Aaamyyy, Amy Furuhara
- Born: Honami Furuhara (古原 ほなみ, Furuhara Honami)
- Origin: Kawakami, Nagano, Japan
- Genres: Electropop; indie rock; psychedelia
- Occupations: Singer; songwriter; producer
- Instruments: Vocals; synthesizer
- Years active: 2013–present
- Label: Space Shower Music
- Member of: Tempalay
- Website: aaamyyy.jp

Honami "Amy" Furuhara (born in Kawakami, Nagano), known professionally as Aaamyyy (/eɪmiː/, stylized as AAAMYYY), is a Japanese electronic musician. Originally a member of electronic pop groups Go Retro and Eimie, Furuhara began working with the psychedelic rock band Tempalay from 2015 (becoming an official member in 2018), and started a solo career in 2017.

== Biography ==
Honami Furuhara grew up in a rural community in Nagano Prefecture and adopted the English name Amy while living in Canada. She first became interested in music when she joined the light music club in high school, where she primarily played the drums. Furuhara was inspired by musicians such as M.I.A. and T-Pain who she heard after traveling to Canada as an exchange student in 2008, and by final year of high school she had begun composing songs. Following high school, Furuhara attended the Kanda University of International Studies, where she spent up to 14 hours per day speaking English, and later a flight attendant school for Air Canada in Vancouver. She returned to Japan as Air Canada required at least three years of work experience, and worked as an English conversation teacher in Osaka.

Furuhara started creating music when she was 22 when she returned to Japan. Inspired by the music she heard in Canada and having some experience using GarageBand, she decided to start a Tokyo-based electropop band called Go Retro with her friend Shiori Ogawa in 2013. Her bandmate Ogawa played the drums and used a Kaoss Pad for their live performances, while Furuhara performed on the synthesizer. Furuhara decided to start singing as the band's vocalist, so that she could lessen the work that Ogawa needed to do. The band released two demos and performed concerts around the Tokyo, Kyoto and Osaka areas, and received a development contract from a record label, where Furuhara was given vocal training lessons. After a year together, the band broke up, as Ogawa decided to return home to Osaka.

Shortly after Go Retro's dissolution in 2014, Furuhara was approached by a DJ called Takuma, and together they formed the group Eemie, producing exclusively English-language music. Initially self-releasing electro/chillwave music on Bandcamp, the group debuted on independent label Maxtreme Records in 2015 with the single "Carnival", and were listed among AP Japan's 36 Bands You Need To Know 2015. Eemie performed at the Summer Sonic summer rock festival in 2015. In 2015, Furuhara met the psychedelic pop/rock group Tempalay, and was invited to perform as a live support member of their band. Furuhara toured the US, performing both as a part of Tempalay and as a member of Eemie in March 2016 (including a performance at South by Southwest). In August 2016 the band disbanded, performing a final concert on August 31, where the band also released their debut and final album.

=== Solo career, Tempalay ===
Furuhara began her solo career in February 2017 as Aaamyyy, after becoming a radio DJ on InterFM's programme Tokyo Scene, where she debuted her song "8PM". For her solo career, she decided to sing in Japanese, as a way to reach listeners more easily in Japan. Aaamyyy released her debut extended play Weekend EP in September on cassette, recording the entire release on her phone, using the iOS app Figure. This was followed by the Maborosi EP in February 2018, as well as a compilation release of this plus her debut EP, entitled Maborosi Weekend, which was her first widely distributed release in Japan.

In June, Furuhara officially became a member of Tempalay, which lead to the band releasing the extended play Nante Subarashiki Sekai in September, featuring Furuhara as the band's synthesizer player, and as their occasional background vocalist. Aaamyyy's final of her three EP series, the Etcetra EP, was released digitally and on cassette in October.

Aaamyyy began recording her debut album Body in October 2018, releasing it in February 2019. A concept album set in 2615, the release was inspired by Netflix television shows such as Black Mirror and Maniac (2018). The album featured collaborations with American musician Computer Magic, New York-based group JIL and Japanese group Paellas' vocalist Matton. Tempalay's third album With Love from the 21 Century was released in June, and was the band's most commercially successful work to date, reaching #30 on Oricon's weekly charts.

In March 2020, Aaamyyy collaborated with musician Shin Sakiura for the song "Night Running", which was used as the ending theme song for the Netflix anime series BNA: Brand New Animal.

In July 2022, she released her fourth EP digitally, entitled ECHO CHAMBER.

== Discography ==
=== Studio albums ===
List of albums, with selected chart positions
Title	Album details	Peak positions	
Title	Album details	JPN Oricon	JPN Hot 100
Body	Released: February 6, 2019; Label: Space Shower Music; Formats: CD, digital download, online streaming, LP	198	—
Annihilation	Released: August 18, 2021; Label: Warner Music Japan; Formats: CD, digital download, streaming	59	59
"—" denotes items that did not chart.

=== Extended plays ===
Title	Album details
Weekend EP	Released: September 17, 2017; Label: Flake Records; Formats: Cassette, digital download
Maborosi EP	Released: February 8, 2018; Label: Flake; Formats: Cassette, digital download
Etcetra EP	Released: October 15, 2018; Label: Flake; Formats: Cassette, digital download
ECHO CHAMBER	Released: July 8, 2022; Label: Warner Music Japan; Formats: Digital download

=== Compilation albums ===
Title	Album details
Maborosi Weekend	Released: February 9, 2018; Label: Aaamyyy; Formats: digital download
Weekend / Maborosi / Etcetra	Released: April 26, 2019; Label: Flake; Formats: LP

=== Singles ===
==== As lead artist ====
List of singles, with selected chart positions
Title	Year	Peak chart positions	Album
Title	Year	JPN Oricon	Album
"Over My Dead Body" (屍を越えてゆけ, Shikabane o Koete Yuke)	2019	—	Body
"Dayz" (Aaamyyy x Monjoe)	2019	—	Non-album single
"Home"	2020	—	Annihilation
"Leeloo"	2020	195	Annihilation
"Utopia"	2020	195	Annihilation
"—" denotes items that did not chart.

==== As featured artist ====
List of singles, with selected chart positions
Title	Year	Peak chart positions		Album
Title	Year	JPN Oricon	JPN Hot 100 Digi	Album
"Supernova" (Stei featuring Amy from Eimie)	2015	—	—	Non-album singles
"Dangerlove" (Jsquared featuring Amy)	2016	—	—	Non-album singles
"Garland" (Kakeru Imaizumi featuring Amy Furuhara)	2016	—	—	Non-album singles
"Make Me Feel" (JSquared featuring Aaamyyy)	2016	—	—	Non-album singles
"RMB Me" (Jsquared featuring Amy)	2017	—	—	Non-album singles
"All Night" (The Jazz Zodiac featuring Amy & Irie)	2018	—	—	Non-album singles
"Downer Love" (ダウナーラブ) (Yonkey featuring Amy)	2019	—	—	Non-album singles
"Konomama Yume de" (このまま夢で; "In My Dream") (Shin Sakiura featuring Aaamyyy)	2020	100	—	Note
"Night Running" (Shin Sakiura featuring Aaamyyy)	2020	—	83	Anime BNA: Brand New Animal Complete Album
"Deep Down" (Sen Morimoto featuring Aaamyyy)	2020	—	—	Sen Morimoto
"Loop" (Shō Okamoto featuring Aaamyyy)	2020	—	—	Cultica
"Glass" (Shō Okamoto featuring Aaamyyy)	2021	—	—	Cultica
"It's So Natural" (Maika Loubté featuring Aaamyyy)	2021	—	—	Lucid Dreaming
"Reconnect" (Yaffle featuring Daichi Yamamoto & Aaamyyy)	2021	—	—	Pokémon 25: The Album
"—" denotes items that did not chart.

=== Promotional singles ===
Title	Year	Album
"After Life"	2021	Annihilation
"Takes Time"	2021	Annihilation
"That smile" (あの笑み, Ano Emi)" (Featuring Ano)	2022	ECHO CHAMBER (EP)
"Hail" (雨, Ame)" (Featuring (sic)boy)	2022	ECHO CHAMBER (EP)

=== Guest appearances ===
List of non-single guest appearances with other performing artists
Title	Year	Other artist(s)	Album
"Crutch"	2015	A Fluxy	Walking on the Same Ground
"Poison"	2016	Five New Old, Yoko from Skall Headz	Ghost in My Place EP
"All in One"	2017	Ryohu	Blur
"Charm Point"	2017	Daoko	Thank You Blue
"Flash (Gōka Kenran Ver.)"	2018	Sanabagun, Nao Kawamura, Tomoko Osaka	Octave Live in Tokyo
"Tōgenkyo to Taxi"	2018	Mega Shinnosuke	Momo
"Song in Blue (Interlude)"	2018	Ryohu	Ten Twenty
"Run Away"	2019	Keiju (Kandytown)	Heartbreak E.P.
"Vampires"	2019	The Jazz Zodiac	Set Me Free EP
"Set Me Free"	2019	The Jazz Zodiac	Set Me Free EP
"Kamera / Music Bar Session (Tokyo Sounds)"	2019	Tendre	Music Bar Session
"You"	2019	Tsubame from Tokyo Health Club, Itto	The Present
"Kami to Kon" (髪と紺; "Hair & Navy Blue")	2019	Odd Foot Works	Gokoh
"Lost Youth"	2019	Opus Inn	Time Stand Still EP
"Opening Theme"	2019	2027Sound, Shō Okamoto, Kōki Okamoto	Hello World Original Soundtrack
"In Sight"	2019	Tendre	In Sight
"Iden"	2020	Breimen	Tity
"Walk the Line"	2020	Max Jenmana	555!
"Highway" (ハイウェイ)	2020	Pearl Center	And Become One
"Fresh"	2020	Tendre, Ryohu	A Life Less Lonely
"The Moment"	2020	Ryohu	Debut
"Midnight Routine"	2020	Mega Shinnosuke	Non-album song
"Flower"	2020	Ryohu	Collage
"Magic"	2021	80kidz	Angle
"P.L.T"	2021	Ermhoi, Julia Shortreed	Zokki Original Soundrtrack
"No Sad!!"	2021	Bugs, Tsubame	Hello New World
"Kiraku ni" (キラクに)	2021	Nabowa	Fantasia
"No End"	2021	Solmana	Awa
"Love Shower"	2021	Solmana, Ermhoi, Nao Kawamura, Sara Yoshida (Mononkvl)	Awa
"Awa"	2021	Solmana, Ermhoi, Nao Kawamura, Sara Yoshida (Mononkvl)	Awa
"I Just Threw Out The Love Of My Dreams"	2022	Asian Kung-Fu Generation	Non-album song

== Songwriting credits ==
Title	Year	Artist(s)	Album
"Intro -Blues-"	2019	Solmana	Amanecer
"Step Ahead"	2019	Solmana	Amanecer
"Roots"	2019	Solmana	Amanecer
"Set Me Free"	2019	Solmana, Dian	Amanecer
"Clione"	2019	Kaela Kimura	Ichigo
