= Marie Ueda =

Japanese singer-songwriter (born 1990)

Marie Ueda 植田真梨恵
- Born: 22 September 1990 (age 35); Kurume, Fukuoka, Japan
- Genres: Japanese pop
- Occupations: singer; songwriter; visual producer
- Years active: 2008–
- Labels: Tent House (2008–2013); Giza Studio (2014–2023); Primarie Records (2024-)
- Website: uedamarie.net

YouTube information
- Channel: 植田真梨恵
- Years active: 2010–present
- Subscribers: 72.1k
- Views: 17.8 million
- Last updated: August 6, 2024

Marie Ueda (植田 真梨恵, Ueda Marie; born 22 September 1990) is a Japanese singer-songwriter. She debuted in 2008, and signed with Giza Studio in 2014. In 2023, she left the agency and has resumed her activities as an independent singer.

== Biography ==
=== Early life ===
At the age of 5 or 6, Ueda dreamed to become a singer one day. During elementary school she tried out in various auditions at singing contests. In 2003, at 12, she sang Yo Hitoto's "Morai Naki" at the Jaccom music festival and won the contest. When she attended middle school, she was scouted by a Fukuoka talent agency, but she rejected the offer. Then she tried out at a Giza Studio audition in her 3rd year of middle school and won.

=== 2008–2013: Indie career ===
In spring of 2007, after graduating from junior high school, Ueda went to live alone in Osaka and started music activities such as live performances and songwriting. Her live performances caught the attention of a staff at the record company, so she began music production.

From January until June 2008, MarUedaie released a monthly digital single. On 30 July 2008, she debuted with her first mini album Taikutsu na Coppelia under indie label Tent House. The album includes previously six released digital singles plus a new recorded song.

On 27 May 2009, she released her second mini album U.M.E.. The album consists of all new songs unlike the previous work.

On 30 June 2010, she released a third mini album Houmuru Liquid Room, the album includes acoustic version of One Hundred Life which was previously released in mini album U.M.E. In December, she participated in Christmas cover album Christmas Non-Stop Carol along with other Giza and Tent House artists.

On 18 April 2012, she released her first indie studio album Sentimental na Rhythm. The album includes song which she wrote between ages 17–22. The album debuted on 214 rank in Oricon Weekly Album Charts. Two album tracks received television promotion. Milky was promoted as an ending theme for BS11's talk television program Shogetsu no Michibiki. Sentimental na Rhythm was used as a Friday's ending theme for television Kanzawa's program Hana no TV Kan-chan. Both of album tracks received music videoclips and are uploaded on official YouTube Channel. Both videoclips were included later in DVD disc of limited edition of first major studio album Hanashi wa Sorekara da.

On 7 August 2013, Ueda released her indies single Kokoro/S/Sa. It was released as a two-track single into a three-disc set. The lead tracks Kokoro to Karada, SOS and Saphire were used as a music in smartphone rhythm video game Show by Rock!!.

=== 2014: Major debut ===
On 11–25 January, Ueda held first piano live tour Live of Lazward Piano at Quattro. On 6 August, Ueda start broadcast weekly her first radio program Ueda Marie no Hebi Ichigo Daifuku on Fm Fukuoka station. On 16 August, after 7 years of indie activities she made her major debut with the first single Kare ni Mamotte Hoshii 10 no koto under Giza Studio label. It served as an ending theme for local television KBS Kyoto program Kyoto Sport. The single debuted at number 82 on the Oricon Weekly Single Charts. The single also debuted at number two on the Billboard Japan Radio songs. On 7–23 September, Ueda held first one-man live tour Utautau Vol.1. On 8 October, Ueda start broadcast weekly her second radio program Nextup Ueda Marie Edition on Inter FM station. On 14 November, she made her first television appearance in TV Tokyo music program Premium Melodix with the second single Zakuro no Mi. On 19 November 2014, Marie released second single Zakuro no Mi. The single debuted at number 87 on the Oricon Weekly Single Charts. On 31 December, Ueda has made appearance in live event Countdown Japan 14/15.

=== 2015: First studio album ===
On 10–18 January, Ueda held second piano live tour Live of Lazward Piano: Aoi Haikyo. On 25 February, Ueda released her first studio album Hanashi wa Sorekara da. Album track Friday served as a commercial song for the Ezaki Glico's candy Collon. The album was released in two formats: CD and CD+DVD. DVD disc includes music videoclips in years 2010–2014. The album debuted at number 45 on the Oricon Weekly Album Charts. On 15 March – 3 April, Ueda held her first album tour Hanashi wa Sorekara da. On 25 March was final broadcast of the radio program Ueda Marie no Hebi Ichigo Daifuku. On 3 April, Ueda released digital single Naita Onakamushi. The single was released on Being Studio official digital download service. In the media it served as a theme song for Fuji TV television program Minna no News. As of 2019, it was never released as a single and was never recorded in the studio album. On 7 July, Ueda started broadcast her third radio program E-Tracks Selection: Ueda Marie no Ikayounimo Kayou on FM Osaka station. On 12 August, Ueda released her third single Wakannai no wa Iya da. B-side track Clear was served as a commercial song for brand Orbis product Clear. This was first Ueda single which was released in two formats: CD and CD+DVD. The DVD disc includes footage from album tour Hanashi wa Sorekara da with total 10 tracks. In the media the single served as an ending theme on August in TBS music television program Count Down TV. Single cover jacket was chosen among top 50 single jackets of the year. The single debuted at number 35 on the Oricon Weekly Single Charts. It was Marie first single which debuted into top 40 of Oricon Weekly Single Charts. On 3–25 October, Ueda held her second one-person live tour Utautau Vol.2. On 22 December, was final broadcast of Ueda's third radio program E-Tracks Selection: Ueda Marie no Ikayounimo Kayou.

=== 2016: First live DVD ===
On 16 January – 13 February, Ueda held her third piano live tour Live of Lazward Piano: Old Fashioned. On 1 February, Ueda released her fourth single "Spectacle". The single was released in two formats: CD and CD+DVD. B-side track Calendar no 13 gatsu was written during Ueda's indies times in 2012. DVD disc includes live footage of Lazward Piano: Aoi Haikyo with total 4 tracks. The single debuted at number 20 on the Oricon Weekly Single Charts. It was first Marie's single which reached into Top 20 of Oricon Weekly Single Charts. As of 2019, the record remains the same. On 6 March, was final broadcast of Ueda's second radio program Nextup Ueda Marie Edition. On 3 April, Ueda held one-day piano live Live of Lazward Piano: Calendar no 13 Gatsu Again. On 6 April, Ueda released her first live DVD which includes footage from live Uta Utau Vol.2.The DVD debuted at number 34 on the Oricon Weekly DVD Charts. On the same day, Ueda start broadcast her fourth radio program Ueda Marie no Anmari Nemutakunai Kayou on Inter FM station. On 4 July, Ueda released her fifth single Furetara Kieteshimau. The single has received multi usage in the media, it was served as a song in the smartphone game Show By Rock and on AbemaTV as an ending theme for online television program Minomonta no Yoru Buzz!. B-side track Rookie served as a cheering song event 2016 KAB Natsu no Koukou Yakyuu. The single was released in two formats: CD+photobook and CD+DVD. DVD disc includes footage from live Shibuya Eggman November 30, 2015. The single debuted at number 32 on the Oricon Weekly Single Charts. Official music videoclip has more than one 1,2 million viewers as of April 2019. On 23 July, Ueda held her first live in Akasaka Blitz live hall Palpable! Bubble! Live!: Summer 2016. On 12 October, Ueda released her fifth single Yume no Parade. The single served as an ending theme for TV Asahi music television program Music-ru TV. B-side track Say Hello was originally written during indies times in 2013 and released as a digital single on 20 November 2013. Another B-side track 210 Bango was in medie served as a theme song for TV Asahi television program Nagasaki Meguri: Utsuwa ni Koisuru Imadoki Onnanoko. The single was released in two formats: CD and CD+DVD. DVD disc includes footage from live DVD UtaUtau Vol.2 Omake: Marie Ueda Mawari Kurume. The single debuted at number 28 on the Oricon Weekly Single Charts. As of 2019, its last Ueda single which debuted into Top 30 of Oricon Weekly Charts. On 14 December, Ueda released her second studio album Lonely Night Magic Spell. The theme of the album is dream. Album track Dining has become the promotion track and served in the media as a power-play song in music television program Bazurizumu and as a song in smartphone game Show By Rock. The album was released in the two formats: CD and CD+DVD. DVD disc includes music videoclips from years 2015–2016. The album debuted at number 30 on the Oricon Weekly Album Charts. On 21 December was final broadcast of Ueda's fourth radio program Ueda Marie no Anmari Nemutakunai Kayou.

=== 2017: Acting debut ===
On 1 January, Ueda released her second live DVD Palpable! Bubble! Live!: Summer 2016. The DVD debuted at number 25 on the Oricon Weekly DVD Charts. On 13 January – 18 February, Ueda held second album live tour Lonely Night Magic Spell. On 29 January, was the premiere of anime movie "Gou-chan Moko to Chinjuu no Mori no Nakama-tachi". In the credits, Ueda appeared as a performer and writer of song Niji wa Kakaru kara. On 5 May, Ueda released her first digital single Niji wa Kakaru kara. On 6 May 2017, Ueda made first appearance in the movie Tomoshibi: Choshi Dentetsu no Chiisa na Kiseki, where she also performed and write theme song for the movie Tomoshibi. On 5 May, Ueda released her second digital single Tomoshibi. On 9 August, Marie released her seventh single Revolver. Ueda directed original music videoclip.The song was written sometime during her indies times. It served as an opening theme for local television ABC Asahi variety program Bebop High-heel. The single was released in two formats: CD and CD+DVD. DVD disc includes making footage of production of music videoclip. The single debuted at number 32 on the Oricon Weekly Single Charts. As of 2019, this single hasn't been recorded in Marie's studio album. On 6–10 September, Ueda held her third one-man live tour Utau Utau Vol.3. On 3 October, Ueda start broadcast her fifth radio program LIFESTYLE MUSIC 929 on Tokai Radio station.

=== 2018: Indies 10th debut anniversary ===
On 3 February – 25 March, Ueda held fourth piano live tour "Live of Lazward Piano: Bilberry". On 21 February, Ueda released her third live DVD Lonely Night Magic Spell. The DVD debuted at number 33 on the Oricon Weekly DVD Charts. On 20 March, Ueda participated in live house event "hills at PanKoujou 15th anniversary" along with Giza Studio artists as Sensation, Doa and Aika Ohno in venue Hills Pan Kōjō. On 6 July 2018, Ueda appeared on BS Japan music television program Shouwa Ongaku Matsuri, where she performed covers of Shouwa songs Mizuiro no Ame and Ihoujin. On 21–30 July, Ueda held live tour Indies 10th Anniversary Live loadSTAR in celebration of Ueda's 10th indies debut anniversary. The live footage was later published on official fanclub. On 25 July, Ueda released her eighth single Wasurena ni Kuchizuke. The single was released in two formats: CD and CD+DVD. DVD disc includes live footage of Wasurena ni Kuchizuke from Live of Lizward Piano Tour: Bilberry Tour. In the media it served as a commercial song for Chouya drink Natsu Ume. The single debuted at number 41 on the Oricon Weekly Single Charts. On 25 August, the song Nagai Yoru served as a commercial song for furniture company Sansyodo campaign Anata de Iru. In 2019 it was recorded in the mini album W.A.H. On 22 September – 4 November, Ueda held one-man live tour Tatta Hitori no One-Man Live Vol.3: Good-bye Stereotype. On 25 September was final broadcast of Ueda's fifth radio program LIFESTYLE MUSIC 929.

=== 2019: Major 5th debut anniversary ===
On 1 January, was launched website to celebrate Ueda's 5th anniversary debut with five releases through first half year. On 16 January, Ueda released her third digital single Far for the first time after two years. On 23 January, Ueda released her first Blu-Ray disc Live of Lazward Piano "bilberry tour" at The Globe Tokyo. The Blu-Ray includes additional live CD from same live tour however recorded on different day. The first press edition included 8 cm CD Bilberry song. The Blu-Ray debuted at number 36 on the Oricon Weekly Blu-Ray Charts. On 20 February, Ueda released her fourth mini album FAR which will include leading digital single Far. The concept of the album is "the growth in adulthood" with intersects of nostalgia and anxiety. The album debuted at number 47 on the Oricon Weekly Album Charts. On 10–23 March, Ueda held piano live tour Live of Lazward Piano: Frozen Constellation. The Blu-ray footage was scheduled to be release in January 2020. On 13 March, Ueda released her fifth digital single Bloomin'. It serves as an ending theme for the TBS television program Count Down TV. On 17 April, Ueda released her fifth mini album WAH. The mini album includes fourth digital single Bloomin', latest disc single Wasurena ni Kuchizuke and digital single Tomoshibi. On 5 May- 30 June, Ueda will hold third album live tour F.A.R. / W.A.H., for the first time after two years. To expand the celebration of 5th anniversary of major debut, between 4–6 August she held small live event Five Flowers Anniversary in Tokyo. Each day will represent instrumentation session and topic of live with various guests. On the first day Piano Romantic Emotion are invited singer Ryoko Yamada and instrumentalist Youdai Nagakome. On the second day Band Divine Emotion is invited vocalist Mikoto of visual key's band Zigzag. On the final third day Hikigatari Daily Emotion is invited singer Hana Sekitori. On 14 September, she held 25-hour live broadcast on her official YouTube channel. In this broadcast, Ueda gave herself a challenge to write q song and film music videoclip in the span of the 25 hours. After the challenge broadcast ended, the song I Just Wanna Be Star was uploaded on her YouTube Channel. On 2 April 2020, it was announced to be a theme song to the Japanese television series. The single is scheduled to release digitally on 1 May 2020. On 1 October, she released her fourth digital single Stranger, which will serve as a theme song to the department store Flags to celebrate their 21st anniversary. On 1 November, she to perform special livePalpable! Marie! Live!: ANNIVERSARY 2019 in venue house "Zepp DiverCity". The live event with subtitle Palpable is for the first time after three years. In December, Ueda will release acoustic album, which will be available only to fanclub members. The public inquiry is available for everyone and can choose five songs which fans want Ueda to record in album.

=== 2020: 3rd original album Heartbreaker ===
Between 26 January and 9 February 2020, she held two piano live series "Live of Lazward Piano "Academic!"" in Osaka's live venue "Mielparque hall" and Tokyo's live venues "Hulic Hall". The announcement was published on news after the live Palpable ended. In spring 2020, her new song "What's" has been used as a theme song to the theatrical movie Mrs.Noisy, which premiered in the 33rd Tokyo Film Festival. It is her second movie theme song for first time in two years. It released as a digital single on 1 May. On 28 August, she release her third studio album Heartbreaker, it became her new album for the first time in 3 years and 8 months. Unlike the previous albums, in which she wrote and produce by her own, this album consists of various musicians and artist from her agency who wrote and arrange music for her. Kazuya Yoshii was special guest to the album recordings, in which he is credited for the "Poetry reading". The album charted at number 33 on the Oricon Weekly Charts. As of 2023, it had become her last album to be part of the Oricon Charts. On the same month, Marie has published her first interview book "GOOD ROCKS! SPECIAL BOOK MARIE UEDA "Chronicle" released under magazine company Good Rocks. In September, on Marie's 30th birthday has launched 25 hours of live-streaming through YouTube, in which she set goal to film videoclip, record voice with instrumental parts and art-cover within the time span. Few days later, the single "Ii Kono Birthday Song" has been released as a digital single. On the same month, Marie has participated as a vocalist to the Taiwanese pianist V.K.'s 10th anniversary album "Endless Falling Lights：Supernova".

=== 2021: First national tour ===
In March, Ueda took part of the special online live event "SHOW BY ROCK!! 3969 Festival 2021: Matsuri!!". In April, she launched her concert tour "LIVE TOUR 2021: HEARTBREAKER", for the first time in four years. The live tour has been originally scheduled to launch in autumn 2020, however due to the worldwide pandemic situation of COVID-19 the whole tour has been postponed as result. During the same time has been announced the list of guests musicians for which day they will appear, includes songwriter Aika Ohno, singer Daria Kawashima and Ueda's sister Mai. In Sepmteber 2021, she released digital single "Ai ni Yuki Machi". In November 2021, Ueda has been credited as a visual producer of the second half of 2021's artist photo for the singer Maica n.

=== 2022: Fourth studio album Euphoria ===
In April 2022, through Official Website has been announced three digital singles to be released monthly - Signal wa No was released in May, Dara Dara was released in June and Baby Baby Baby was released in July. Signal wa No has been used as a power-play track on the radio station Fm-Fuji's program "Sound Forest". Dara Dara has been previously included in the debut single's as b-side track under subtitle demo, this version has been completely re-recorded and rewritten. In September 2022, she released her fourth studio album "Euphoria". It has been written, produced by Marie herself and arranged by Ryota Mori. The album consist of the collections of songs, which were "in the stock", majority of them written during her indies times and previously released singles. The track "Saihate he" has been previously included in the single's Wasurena ni Kuchizuke under subtitle demo, this version has been completely re-recorded and rewritten. The album has failed to chart at the Oricon Weekly charts. On the same month, she released her seventh video album "LIVE TOUR 2021: HEARTBREAKER", which includes live footage of the live tour launched in 2021. The video-album has also failed to top on the Oricon Weekly Charts.

=== 2023: Departure and freelance ===
In January, Ueda has released her first compilation album Best of Lazard Piano: Aoi Hako. The album consisted of two discs-all of the tracks has special piano arrangements provided by Nishimura and the tracks were selected and chosen by Ueda herself. In February, she released her eighth video album "Live of Lazward Piano: Academic!", which includes footage of the series of the live concerts with the piano held in 2020. On the same month she held Lazard anniversary concert "LIVE OF LAZWARD PIANO: Aoi Hata" in Tokyo. On 31 March 2023, Ueda's staff announced through her official website of not renewing contract with the agency Giza Studio and will continue her musical activities as an independent artist from May. In July 2023, she posted on her secondary YouTube channel previously unreleased song "Hazukashii", which she composed during her times in Giza and by this song wanted to "express the expectations and anxiety of the departure". On the same day she had launched new official website and fan club. In August 2023, Ueda was credited with a visual photo and visual music video produced for the Maica_n's digital single Kiss and Kiss. In September 2023, Ueda announced through her website a series of live concerts titled "Ueda Marie Major debut, 10 YEAR kinen Live: Kirameki to Tameiki" through entire Japan, scheduled to start from January and ending in December 2024. In November 2023, Ueda made a guest appearance at the Japan Culture-Con festival held at Dubai, United Arab Emirates. It became her first overseas stage appearance since her debut.

== Musical style ==
=== Influence ===
Ueda was influenced by Hikaru Utada, Shiina Ringo, Yuko Ando, Chara, Yuki, Yoeko Kurahashi and Salyu.

== Discography ==
Ueda has released 8 singles, 3 studio albums, 1 compilation album, 5 mini albums, 3 DVDs and 5 Blu-ray.

=== Albums ===
==== Studio albums ====
Title	Album details	Peak chart positions
Title	Album details	JPN Oricon
Sentimental na Rhythm （センチメンタルなリズム）	Released: 18 August 2012; Label: Tent House; Formats: CD, digital download	—
Hanashi wa Sorekara da （はなしはそれからだ）	Released: 25 February 2015; Label: Giza Studio; Formats: CD, digital download	45
Lonely Night Magic Spell （ロンリーナイト マジックスペル）	Released: 14 December 2016; Label: Giza Studio; Formats: CD, digital download	30
Heartbreaker （ハートブレイカー）	Released: 26 August 2020; Label: Giza Studio; Formats: CD, CD+DVD+photobook, digital download	34
Euphoria	Released: 21 September 2022; Label: Giza Studio; Formats: CD, CD+Blu-Ray, LP, digital download	—

==== Extended plays ====
Title	Album details	Peak chart positions
Title	Album details	JPN Oricon
Taikutsu na Coppélia （退屈なコッペリア）	Released: 30 July 2008; Label: Tent House; Formats: CD, digital download	—
U.M.E.	Released: 27 May 2009; Label: Tent House; Formats: CD, digital download	—
Houmuru Liquid Room （葬るリキッドルーム）	Released: 30 June 2010; Label: Tent House; Formats: CD, digital download	—
F.A.R.	Released: 20 February 2019; Label: Giza Studio; Formats: CD, CD+DVD, digital download	47
W.A.H.	Released: 17 April 2019; Label: Giza Studio; Formats: CD, CD+DVD, digital download	33

==== Compilation album ====
Title	Album details
Best of Lazward Piano: Aoi Hako （青い箱）	Released: 18 January 2013; Label: Giza Studio, Formats: CD, CD+Blu-ray; Self-cover & best album

==== Box albums ====
Title	Album details
Kokoro/S/Sa （心/S/サ）	Released: 7 August 2013; Label: Tent House; Formats: CD; Consists of three maxi-singles: "Kokoro to Karada"（心と体）, "S･O･S" and "Sapphire!"（サファイア！）

=== Singles ===
==== As lead artist ====
Year	Single	Peak chart positions		Album
Year	Single	JPN	JPN Physical	Album
2014	"Kare ni Mamotte Hoshii Juu no koto" （彼に守ってほしい10のこと）	15	82	Hanashi wa Sorekara da
2014	"Zakuro no Mi" （ザクロの実）	78	87	Hanashi wa Sorekara da
2015	"Wakannai no wa Iyada" （わかんないのはいやだ）	48	35	Lonely Night Magic Spell
2016	"Spectacle" （スペクタクル）	76	20	Lonely Night Magic Spell
2016	"Furetara Kieteshimau" （ふれたら消えてしまう）	93	32	Lonely Night Magic Spell
2016	"Yume no Parade" （夢のパレード）	65	28	Lonely Night Magic Spell
2017	"Revolver"	–	32	Heartbreaker
2018	"Wasurena ni Kuchizuke" （勿忘にくちづけ）	90	41	WAH

==== Digital singles ====
Year	Single	Album
2008	"Yokaze" （夜風）	Taikutsu na Coppélia
2008	"Hako: Box" （箱: ボックス）	Taikutsu na Coppélia
2008	"Wasuremono" （忘れもの）	Taikutsu na Coppélia
2008	"Hallucination" （ハルシネーション）	Taikutsu na Coppélia
2008	"Shiroi Tsuki" （白い月）	Taikutsu na Coppélia
2008	"Curtain no Shishuu" （カーテンの刺繍）	Taikutsu na Coppélia
2013	"Kokoro to Karada" （心と体）	Kokoro/S/Sa
2013	"S･O･S"	Kokoro/S/Sa
2013	"Sapphire!" （サファイア！）	Kokoro/S/Sa
2015	"Naita Onaka no Mushi" （鳴いたお腹の虫）	Non-album singles
2017	"Niji wa Kakaru kara" (虹はかかるから)	Non-album singles
2017	"Tomoshibi" (灯)	WAH
2019	"FAR"	FAR
2019	"Bloomin'"	WAH
2019	"Stranger"	Heartbreaker
2020	"What's"	Heartbreaker
2020	"I Just Wanna Be a Star"	Heartbreaker
2020	"Ii Kono Birthday Song"	Non-album single
2021	"Ai ni yuku machi" (あいにゆくまち)	Non-album single
2022	"Signal wa No" (”シグナルはノー”)	Euphoria
2022	"DaraDara" (ダラダラ)	Euphoria
2022	"BABY BABY BABY"	Euphoria
2024	"Hazukashii" (”恥ずかしい”)	Non-album single
2025	"Braver"	Non-album single

=== Video albums ===
Title	Album details	Peak chart positions
Title	Album details	JPN Oricon
UTAUTAU Vol.2	Released: 6 April 2016; Label: Giza Studio; Formats: DVD	34
Palpable! Bubble! Live!: Summer 2016	Released: 11 January 2017; Label: Giza Studio; Formats: DVD	25
Ueda Marie Live Tour 2017 "Lonely Night Magic Spell"	Released: 21 February 2018; Label: Giza Studio; Formats: DVD	33
Ueda Marie Live of Lazward Piano "bilberry tour"	Released: 23 January 2019; Label: Giza Studio; Formats: Blu-ray	36
Ueda Marie Live of Lazward Piano: Frozen Constellation"	Released: 8 January 2020; Label: Giza Studio; Formats: Blu-ray	45
Palpable! Marble! Live! –Anniversary 2019-	Released: 26 August 2020; Label: Giza Studio; Formats: Blu-ray	29
LIVE TOUR 2021 HEARTBREAKER	Released: 21 September 2022; Label: Giza Studio; Formats: Blu-ray	-
LIVE of LAZWARD PIANO “Academic!”	Released: 15 February 2023; Label: Giza Studio; Formats: Blu-ray	-

== Interview ==
From Natasha Ent.:

- 2014 "Kareshi Mamotte Hoshii 10 no Koto"
- 2014 "Zakuro no Mi"
- 2015 "Hanashi wa Sorekara da"
- 2015 "Wakannai no wa Iyada"
- 2016 "Spectacle"
- 2016 "Furetara Kieteshimau"
- 2016 "Yume no Parade"
- 2016 "Lonely Night Magic Spell"

From Rockinon:

- 2014 "Kareshi Mamotte Hoshii 10 no Koto"
- 2014 "Zakuro no Mi"
- 2015 "Hanashi wa Sorekara da"
- 2015 "Wakannai no wa Iyada"

From Skream!:

- 2015 "Wakannai no wa Iyada"
- 2016 "Spectacle"
- 2016 "Furetara Kieteshimau"
- 2016 "Yume no Parade"
- 2016 "Lonely Night Magic Spell"

From M-found:

- 2014 "Kareshi Mamotte Hoshii 10 no Koto"
- 2014 "Zakuro no Mi"
- 2015 "Hanashi wa Sorekara da"
- 2015 "Wakannai no wa Iyada"

From Okmusic:

- 2014 "Kareshi Mamotte Hoshii 10 no Koto"
- 2014 "Zakuro no Mi"
- 2015 "Hanashi wa Sorekara da"

From Barks:

- 2014 "Kareshi Mamotte Hoshii 10 no Koto"
- 2014 "Zakuro no Mi"
- 2015 "Hanashi wa Sorekara da"
- 2015 "Wakannai no wa Iyada"
- 2016 "Spectacle"
- 2016 "Furetara Kieteshimau"
- 2016 "Yume no Parade"
- 2016 "Lonely Night Magic Spell"
- 2017 "Revolver"

From Music Voice:

- 2017 "Revolver"

From Duke express:

- 2016 "Lonely Night Magic Spell"

From HMW:

- 2016 "Lonely Night Magic Spell"

== Magazine appearances ==
From Music Freak Magazine:

- May 2009 Vol.173
- October 2009 Vol.178
- December 2009 Vol.180

From Music freak magazine ES:

- August 2010 Vol.008
- August 2012 Vol.032
- November 2012 Vol.035
- February 2013 Vol.038
- August 2013 Vol.044
- July 2014 Vol.055
- October 2014 Vol.058
- November 2014 Vol.059
- February 2015 Vol.062
- March 2015 Vol.063
- April 2015 Vol.064
- July 2015 Vol.067
- September 2015 Vol.068
- November 2015 Vol.069
- January 2016 Vol.071
- February 2016 Vol.072
