= List of Japanese films of 2019 =

This is a list of Japanese films that were released, or are scheduled to release in 2019.

== Highest-grossing films ==
The following is a list of the 10 highest-grossing Japanese films released at the Japanese box office during 2019.

Rank	Title	Gross
1	Weathering with You	¥14.06 billion ($128.98 million)
2	Detective Conan: The Fist of Blue Sapphire	¥9.37 billion ($85.96 million)
3	Kingdom	¥5.73 billion ($52.56 million)
4	One Piece: Stampede	¥5.55 billion ($50.91 million)
5	Doraemon: Nobita's Chronicle of the Moon Exploration	¥5.02 billion ($46.05 million)
6	Masquerade Hotel	¥4.64 billion ($42.57 million)
7	Dragon Ball Super: Broly	¥4.00 billion ($36.69 million)
8	Fly Me to the Saitama	¥3.76 billion ($34.49 million)
9	Hit Me Anyone One More Time	¥3.64 billion ($33.39 million)
10	Mewtwo Strikes Back: Evolution	¥2.98 billion ($27.34 million)

== Film releases ==
=== January – March ===
Opening		Title	Director	Cast	Ref(s)
J A N U A R Y	4	Love Live! Sunshine!! The School Idol Movie: Over the Rainbow!	Kazuo Sakai	Anju Inami, Rikako Aida, Nanaka Suwa, Arisa Komiya, Shuka Saitō, Aika Kobayashi	
J A N U A R Y	4	Made in Abyss The Movie Series	Masayuki Kojima	Miyu Tomita, Mariya Ise, Shiori Izawa, Sayaka Ohara, Aki Toyosaki, Mutsumi Tamura	
J A N U A R Y	11	This Old Road: Konomichi	Kiyoshi Sasabe	Nao Ōmori, Akira, Shihori Kanjiya, Wakana Matsumoto	
J A N U A R Y	12	Fate/stay night: Heaven's Feel II. lost butterfly	Tomonori Sudō	Noriaki Sugiyama, Noriko Shitaya, Yū Asakawa, Mai Kadowaki	
J A N U A R Y	18	Chiwawa	Ken Ninomiya	Mugi Kadowaki, Ryo Narita, Kanichiro, Shiori Yoshida, Tadanobu Asano	
J A N U A R Y	18	His Lost Name	Nanako Hirose	Yūya Yagira, Young Dais, Kaoru Kobayashi, Tsunekichi Suzuki	
J A N U A R Y	18	Masquerade Hotel	Masayuki Suzuki	Takuya Kimura, Masami Nagasawa, Fumiyo Kohinata	
J A N U A R Y	18	Touken Ranbu	Saiji Yakumo	Hiroki Suzuki, Yoshihiko Aramaki, Ryō Kitamura, Masanari Wada	
J A N U A R Y	25	12 Suicidal Teens	Yukihiko Tsutsumi	Mahiro Takasugi, Hana Sugisaki, Mackenyu, Takumi Kitamura, Kanna Hashimoto, Ai Yoshikawa	
J A N U A R Y	25	Psycho-Pass SS Series	Naoyoshi Shotani	Ayane Sakura, Kenji Nojima, Hiroki Tōchi, Kinryū Arimoto	
J A N U A R Y	25	Aiuta: My Promise to Nakuhito	Taisuke Kawamura	Ryusei Yokohama, Kaya Kiyohara, Hiroki Iijima	
J A N U A R Y	25	School-Live!	Issei Shbata	Nanami Abe, Midori Nagatsuki, Wakana Majima, Rio Kiyohara	
J A N U A R Y	25	Sky's Restaurant	Yoshihiro Fukagawa	Yo Oizumi, Manami Honjo, Masaki Okada, Makita Sports, Tsutomu Takahashi, Huwie Ishizaki	
J A N U A R Y	25	Kamen Rider Build NEW WORLD: Kamen Rider Cross-Z	Kyohei Yamaguchi	Eiji Akaso, Atsuhiro Inukai, Kaho Takada, Kouhei Takeda, Yukari Taki, Kensei Mikami	
J A N U A R Y	26	Day and Night	Michihito Fujii	Shinnosuke Abe, Kaya Kiyohara, Masanobu Andō, Tetsushi Tanaka	
F E B R U A R Y	1	Whistleblower	Katsuo Fukuzawa	Mansai Nomura, Teruyuki Kagawa, Mitsuhiro Oikawa, Kataoka Ainosuke VI, Aki Asakura, Kin'ya Kitaōji	
F E B R U A R Y	1	Snow Flower	Kōjirō Hashimoto	Hiroomi Tosaka, Ayami Nakajo, Saki Takaoka, Kenta Hamano	
F E B R U A R Y	1	Red Snow	Sayaka Kai	Masatoshi Nagase, Nahana, Kōichi Satō	
F E B R U A R Y	8	City Hunter the Movie: Shinjuku Private Eyes	Kenji Kodama	Akira Kamiya, Kazue Ikura, Marie Iitoyo, Kōichi Yamadera	
F E B R U A R Y	8	21st Century Girl	Various	Ai Hashimoto, Erika Karata, Momoko Takeuchi, Shizuka Ishibashi	
F E B R U A R Y	8	Back Street Girls: Gokudolls	Keinosuke Hara	Natsumi Okamoto, Ruka Matsuda, Akane Sakanoue, Jin Shirasu, Reiya Masaki, Matsato Hanazawa, Dori Sakurada	
F E B R U A R Y	8	The Saga of Tanya the Evil	Yutaka Uemura	Aoi Yūki, Saori Hayami, Shin-ichiro Miki, Tesshō Genda, Hōchū Ōtsuka, Kenyuu Horiuchi	
F E B R U A R Y	9	Code Geass: Lelouch of the Re;surrection	Gorō Taniguchi	Jun Fukuyama, Takahiro Sakurai, Yukana, Ami Koshimizu, Kaori Nazuka, Fumiko Orikasa	
F E B R U A R Y	15	Is It Wrong to Try to Pick Up Girls in a Dungeon?: Arrow of the Orion	Katsushi Sakurabi	Yoshitsugu Matsuoka, Inori Minase, Saori Ōnishi, Maaya Uchida, Yoshimasa Hosoya, Soma Saito	
F E B R U A R Y	15	Fortuna's Eye	Takahiro Miki	Ryunosuke Kamiki, Kasumi Arimura, Jun Shison, Daigo	
F E B R U A R Y	15	Tiger: My Life as a Cat	Masaya Kakehi	Hiromitsu Kitayama, Mikako Tabe, Hiroshiro Hirasawa, Marie Iitoyo	
F E B R U A R Y	15	Another World	Junji Sakamoto	Goro Inagaki, Hiroki Hasegawa, Kiyohiko Shibukawa, Chizuru Ikewaki	
F E B R U A R Y	22	The Day's Organ	Emiko Hiramatsu	Erika Toda, Sakurako Ohara, Yui Sakuma, Tōko Miura	
F E B R U A R Y	22	Samurai Marathon	Bernard Rose	Takeru Satoh, Nana Komatsu, Mirai Moriyama	
F E B R U A R Y	22	When My Mom Died, I Wanted to Eat Her Ashes	Tatsushi Ōmori	Ken Yasuda, Mitsuko Baisho, Nao Matsushita, Jun Murakami	
F E B R U A R Y	22	Rin	Katsuhiko Ikeda	Hayato Sano, Kanata Hongō, Kenta Suga, Yuki Kameda	
F E B R U A R Y	22	Fly Me to the Saitama	Hideki Takeuchi	Fumi Nikaidō, Gackt, Yūsuke Iseya, Masaki Kyomoto, Kumiko Takeda	
F E B R U A R Y	22	The Island of Cats	Mitsuaki Iwagō	Tatekawa Shinosuke, Kō Shibasaki, Tasuku Emoto, Guin Poon Chaw, Takashi Yamanaka, Shono Hayama	
M A R C H	1	Until I Meet September's Love	Toru Yamamoto	Issey Takahashi, Haruna Kawaguchi, Kenta Hamano, Yūko Nakamura	
M A R C H	1	Doraemon: Nobita's Chronicle of the Moon Exploration	Shinnosuke Yakuwa	Wasabi Mizuta, Megumi Ohara, Yumi Kakazu, Subaru Kimura, Tomokazu Seki	
M A R C H	2	King of Prism: Shiny Seven Stars I: Prologue × Yukinojo × Taiga	Masakazu Hishida	Junta Terashima, Soma Saito, Tasuku Hatanaka, Taku Yashiro, Takuma Nagatsuka, Masashi Igarashi, Yuma Uchida	
M A R C H	8	Ultraman R/B The Movie: Select! The Crystal of Bond	Masayoshi Takesue	Yuya Hirata, Ryosuke Koike, Arisa Sonohara, Kaori Manabe, Ginnojo Yamazaki, Yukito Nishii, Ayane Kinoshita, Kanoko Sudo, Yua Shiraishi, Nanako Ōde, Hideko Hara, Tatsuomi Hamada	
M A R C H	15	You Shine in the Moonlit Night	Sho Tsukikawa	Mei Nagano, Takumi Kitamura, Shouma Kai, Honoka Matsumoto, Mio Imada	
M A R C H	15	Makuko	Keiko Tsuruoka	Hikaru Yamazaki, Tsuyoshi Kusanagi, Risa Sudo, Tsuyoshi Kusanagi	
M A R C H	16	PreCure Miracle Universe	Yukio Kaizawa	Eimi Naruse, Konomi Kohara, Kiyono Yasuno, Mikako Komatsu	
M A R C H	21	L-DK: Two Loves, Under One Roof	Taisuke Kawamura	Mone Kamishiraishi, Yosuke Sugino, Ryusei Yokohama	
M A R C H	21	Prince of Legend	Kentarō Moriya	Alan Shirahama, Ryota Katayose, Nobuyuki Suzuki, Reo Sano, Mandy Sekiguchi, Kazuma Kawamura	
M A R C H	23	Marriage Hunting Beauty	Akiko Ōku	Mei Kurokawa, Asami Usuda, Tomoya Nakamura, Kei Tanaka	
M A R C H	23	Children's Diner	Tarō Hyūgaji	Kanata Fujimoto, Rio Suzuki, Ren Asakawa, Rin Furukawa	
M A R C H	23	King of Prism: Shiny Seven Stars II: Kakeru × Joji × Minato	Masakazu Hishida	Taku Yashiro, Tomokazu Sugita, Takayuki Kobayashi, Masashi Igarashi	
M A R C H	29	Ninja Drones?	Katsuhide Motoki	Jesse, Taiga Kyomoto, Yugo Kochi, Hokuto Matsumura, Juri Tanaka, Shintaro Morimoto, Hikaru Iwamoto, Tatsuya Fukazawa, You Yokoyama	

=== April – June ===
Opening		Title	Director	Cast	Ref(s)
A P R I L	5	A Gambler's Odyssey 2020	Kazuya Shiraishi	Takumi Saito, Momo, Naoto Takenaka, Becky	
A P R I L	5	Laidbackers	Hiroyuki Hashimoto	Rina Hidaka, Himika Akaneya, Yō Taichi, Yumi Uchiyama	
A P R I L	5	You Are Brilliant Like a Spica	Kentarō Ōtani	Haruka Fukuhara, Taiki Sato, Takuya Suzuki, Hiroe Igeta	
A P R I L	12	Detective Conan: The Fist of Blue Sapphire	Chika Nagaoka	Minami Takayama, Wakana Yamazaki, Rikiya Koyama, Kappei Yamaguchi	
A P R I L	12	Love's Twisting Path	Sadao Nakajima	Kengo Kora, Mikako Tabe, Ryo Kimura, Yuriko Mishima	
A P R I L	13	King of Prism: Shiny Seven Stars III: Leo × Yu × Alec	Masakazu Hishida	Takuma Nagatsuka, Yuma Uchida, Shunsuke Takeuchi	
A P R I L	19	Crayon Shin-chan: Honeymoon Hurricane ~The Lost Hiroshi~	Masakazu Hashimoto	Yumiko Kobayashi, Miki Narahashi, Toshiyuki Morikawa	
A P R I L	19	Kingdom	Shinsuke Sato	Kento Yamazaki, Ryo Yoshizawa, Kanna Hashimoto, Masami Nagasawa, Kanata Hongō, Takao Osawa, Shinnosuke Mitsushima	
A P R I L	19	Just Only Love	Rikiya Imaizumi	Yukino Kishii, Ryo Narita, Mai Fukagawa, Ryuya Wakaba	
A P R I L	26	The Wonderland	Keiichi Hara	Mayu Matsuoka, Anne Watanabe, Kumiko Asō, Nao Tōyama	
M A Y	3	Kakegurui – Compulsive Gambler	Tsutomu Hanabusa	Minami Hamabe, Mahiro Takasugi, Aoi Morikawa	
M A Y	3	Lupinranger VS Patranger VS Kyuranger	Hiroyuki Kato	Asahi Itou, Shogo Hama, Haruka Kudō, Kousei Yuki, Ryo Yokoyama, Kazusa Okuyama, Takumi Kizu, Yosuke Kishi, Taiki Yamazaki, Sakurako Okubo, Tetsuji Sakakibara, Shota Taguchi, Keisuke Minami, Hiroya Matsumoto	
M A Y	4	King of Prism: Shiny Seven Stars IV: Louis × Shin × Unknown	Masakazu Hishida	Junta Terashima, Shouta Aoi, Soma Saito, Tasuku Hatanaka, Taku Yashiro, Takuma Nagatsuka, Masashi Igarashi, Yuma Uchida	
M A Y	10	Hikinige: Leaving the Scene	Yutaka Mizutani	Masei Nakayama, Yutaka Mizutani, Ryoko Kobayashi, Katsuya Maikuma	
M A Y	10	Cheer Boys!!	Hiroki Kazama	Ryusei Yokohama, Masaki Nakao, Toshiki Seto, Shogo Iwaya, Ken Sugawara, Daichi Kodaira	
M A Y	10	Kabaneri of the Iron Fortress: Unato Decisive Battle	Tetsurō Araki	Tasuku Hatanaka, Sayaka Senbongi, Maaya Uchida, Toshiki Masuda	
M A Y	10	Toshimaen	Hiroshi Takahashi	Rie Kitahara, Fujiko Kojima, Nana Asakawa, Ruka Matsuda	
M A Y	10	Dad, Chibi is Gone	Hiroki Kazama	Chieko Baisho, Tatsuya Fuji, Mikako Ichikawa, Ryūji Satō	
M A Y	17	Iwane: Sword of Serenity	Katsuhide Motoki	Tori Matsuzaka, Fumino Kimura, Kyoko Yoshine, Tasuku Emoto, Yosuke Sugino	
M A Y	17	The Confidence Man JP: The Movie	Ryo Tanaka	Masami Nagasawa, Masahiro Higashide, Fumiyo Kohinata	
M A Y	17	According to Our Butler	Shinji Kuma	Ren Nagase, Sho Kiyohara, Yuta Jinguji, Mio Yūki	
M A Y	24	Aircraft Carrier Ibuki	Setsurō Wakamatsu	Hidetoshi Nishijima, Kuranosuke Sasaki, Tsubasa Honda, Masahiro Takashima, Hiroshi Tamaki	
M A Y	24	Sadako	Hideo Nakata	Elaiza Ikeda, Takashi Tsukamoto, Hiroya Shimizu	
M A Y	24	Promare	Hiroyuki Imaishi	Kenichi Matsuyama, Taichi Saotome, Masato Sakai, Ayane Sakura, Hiroyuki Yoshino, Tetsu Inada	
M A Y	24	Little Love Song	Kōjirō Hashimoto	Hayato Sano, Yūki Morinaga, Anna Yamada, Gordon Maeda, Jin Suzuki	
M A Y	31	Parallel World Love Story	Yoshitaka Mori	Yuta Tamamori, Riho Yoshioka, Shōta Sometani	
M A Y	31	A Long Goodbye, Double Life	Ryōta Nakano	Yū Aoi, Yūko Takeuchi, Chieko Matsubara, Tsutomu Yamazaki	
M A Y	31	The Farewell Song	Akihiko Shiota	Nana Komatsu, Mugi Kadowaki, Ryo Narita	
J U N E	7	Almost a Miracle	Yuya Ishii	Kanata Hosoda, Nagisa Sekimizu, Nanako Matsushima	
J U N E	7	Children of the Sea	Ayumu Watanabe	Mana Ashida, Hero Ishibashi, Seishū Uragami	
J U N E	14	Don't Cry, Mr. Ogre	Atsushi Kaneshige	Shinichi Tsutsumi, Yūya Yagira, Rina Kawaei, Ryo Ryusei, Kazuki Horike, Ryo Sato	
J U N E	14	For Whom The Alchemist Exists	Shōji Kawamori	Inori Minase, Natsuki Hanae, Kaito Ishikawa, Yōko Hikasa	
J U N E	15	Rascal Does Not Dream of a Dreaming Girl	Katsuya Kikuchi	Kaito Ishikawa, Asami Seto, Yurika Kubo, Nao Tōyama	
J U N E	21	Ride Your Wave	Masaaki Yuasa	Ryota Katayose, Rina Kawaei, Honoka Matsumoto, Kentaro Ito	
J U N E	21	The Fable	Kan Eguchi	Junichi Okada, Fumino Kimura, Mizuki Yamamoto, Kōichi Satō, Yūya Yagira, Sota Fukushi	
J U N E	21	Brave Father Online: Our Story of Final Fantasy XIV	Theo Noguchi, Kiyoshi Yamamoto	Kentaro Sakaguchi, Kotaro Yoshida, Yui Sakuma, Maika Yamamoto	
J U N E	28	The Journalist	Michihito Fujii	Shim Eun-kyung, Tori Matsuzaka, Tsubasa Honda, Amane Okayama, Tomohiro Kaku	
J U N E	28	Hot Gimmick	Yūki Yamato	Miona Hori, Hiroya Shimizu, Mizuki Itagaki, Shotaro Mamiya	
J U N E	28	Bento Harassment	Renpei Tsukamoto	Ryoko Shinohara, Kyoko Yoshine, Rena Matsui, Kanta Sato, Ryuta Sato	
J U N E	29	Frame Arms Girl: Kyakkyau Fufu na Wonderland	Keiichiro Kawaguchi	Yōko Hikasa, Narumi Kaho, Yu Ayase, Rika Nagae	

=== July – September ===
Opening		Title	Director	Cast	Ref(s)
J U L Y	5	Diner	Mika Ninagawa	Tatsuya Fujiwara, Shun Oguri, Rina Kawaei, Tina Tamashiro	
J U L Y	12	Mewtwo Strikes Back: Evolution	Kunihiko Yuyama, Mikinori Sakakibara	Rica Matsumoto, Ikue Ōtani, Masachika Ichimura	
J U L Y	19	Tokyo Ghoul S	Takuya Kawasaki, Kazuhiko Hiramaki	Masataka Kubota, Maika Yamamoto, Shota Matsuda, Mackenyu	
J U L Y	19	Weathering with You	Makoto Shinkai	Kotaro Daigo, Nana Mori, Shun Oguri, Tsubasa Honda, Chieko Baisho, Sakura Kiryu	
J U L Y	26	The Great War of Archimedes	Takashi Yamazaki	Masaki Suda, Hiroshi Tachi, Minami Hamabe Min Tanaka	
J U L Y	26	A Girl Missing	Kōji Fukada	Mariko Tsutsui, Mikako Ichikawa, Sosuke Ikematsu, Ren Sudo	
J U L Y	26	Kamen Rider Zi-O: Over Quartzer	Ryuta Tasaki	So Okuno, Gaku Oshida, Shieri Ohata, Keisuke Watanabe, Katsuhia Namase, Rikiya Koyama, Yohei Onishi, AFRO	
J U L Y	26	Kishiryu Sentai Ryusoulger The Movie: Time Slip! Dinosaur Panic!!	Kazuya Kamihoriuchi	Hayate Ichinose, Keito Tsuna, Ichika Osaki, Yuito Obara, Tatsuya Kishida, Katsumi Hyodo	
A U G U S T	2	Dragon Quest: Your Story	Takashi Yamazaki	Takeru Satoh, Kasumi Arimura, Haru, Kentaro Sakaguchi, Takayuki Yamada, Kendo Kobayashi	
A U G U S T	9	One Piece: Stampede	Takashi Otsuka	Mayumi Tanaka, Kazuya Nakai, Akemi Okamura, Kappei Yamaguchi	
A U G U S T	16	Dance with Me	Shinobu Yaguchi	Ayaka Miyoshi, Yu Yashiro, Chay, Takahiro Miura	
A U G U S T	21	NiNoKuni	Yoshiyuki Momose	Kento Yamazaki, Mackenyu, Mei Nagano, Mamoru Miyano, Kenjiro Tsuda, Maaya Sakamoto	
A U G U S T	23	Ossan's Love the Movie: Love or Dead	Ichiro Rutoto	Kei Tanaka, Kento Hayashi, Rio Uchida, Daichi Kaneko, Jun Shison	
A U G U S T	30	KonoSuba: God's Blessing on this Wonderful World! Legend of Crimson	Takaomi Kanasaki	Jun Fukushima, Sora Amamiya, Rie Takahashi, Ai Kayano	
A U G U S T	30	Samurai Shifters!	Isshin Inudo	Gen Hoshino, Issey Takahashi, Mitsuki Takahata	
S E P T E M B E R	6	Go Away, Ultramarine	Akina Yanagi	Ryusei Yokohama, Marie Iitoyo, Honoka Yahagi, Kodai Matsuoka	
S E P T E M B E R	6	Taro the Fool	Tatsushi Ōmori	Yoshi, Masaki Suda, Taiga Nakano	
S E P T E M B E R	6	Typhoon Family	Masahide Ichii	Tsuyoshi Kusanagi, Hirofumi Arai, Megumu, Tomoya Nakamura	
S E P T E M B E R	6	Kamen Rider Build NEW WORLD: Kamen Rider Grease	Shojiro Nakazawa	Kouhei Takeda, Atsuhiro Inukai, Eiji Akaso, Kaho Takada, Yukari Taki, Kensei Mikami	
S E P T E M B E R	11	They Say Nothing Stays the Same	Joe Odagiri	Akira Emoto, Nijiro Murakami, Lilica Kawashima, Tsuyoshi Ihara	
S E P T E M B E R	13	Kaguya-sama: Love Is War	Eiichirō Hasumi, Hayato Kawai	Sho Hirano, Kanna Hashimoto, Hayato Sano, Nana Asakawa, Mayu Hotta	
S E P T E M B E R	13	No Longer Human	Mika Ninagawa	Shun Oguri, Rie Miyazawa, Erika Sawajiri, Fumi Nikaidō, Tatsuya Fujiwara	
S E P T E M B E R	13	Hit Me Anyone One More Time!	Kōki Mitani	Kiichi Nakai, Kōichi Satō, Dean Fujioka, Yuriko Ishida	
S E P T E M B E R	20	Hello World	Tomohiko Ito	Takumi Kitamura, Tori Matsuzaka, Minami Hamabe, Haruka Fukuhara, Minako Kotobuki, Rie Kugimiya	
S E P T E M B E R	20	Three Nobunagas	Kei Watanabe	Takahiro, Hayato Ichihara, Yoshinori Okada	
S E P T E M B E R	20	Blind: The Great Witness	Junichi Mori	Riho Yoshioka, Mahiro Takasugi, Koji Okura, Kodai Asaka	
S E P T E M B E R	20	Love Stoppage Time	Hayato Kawai	Mizuki Itagaki, Sakura Kiryū, Ryoma Takeuchi	
S E P T E M B E R	20	Eine Kleine Nachtmusik: Little Nights, Little Love	Rikiya Imaizumi	Haruma Miura, Mikako Tabe, Yuma Yamamoto, Erica Mori	
S E P T E M B E R	25	Ninkyō Gakuen	Hisashi Kimura	Hidetoshi Nishijima, Toshiyuki Nishida, Atsushi Itō, Wakana Aoi, Shono Hayama, Tetsuhiro Ikeda	
S E P T E M B E R	27	The Flowers of Evil	Noboru Iguchi	Kentaro Ito, Tina Tamashiro, Shiori Akita, Marie Iitoyo	
S E P T E M B E R	27	Legend of the Galactic Heroes: Die Neue These Seiran Trilogy	Shunsuke Tada	Mamoru Miyano, Kenichi Suzumura, Yūichirō Umehara	
S E P T E M B E R	27	And Life Goes On	Shō Tsukikawa	Kasumi Arimura, Kentaro Sakaguchi, Kang Ji-young, Amane Okayama	

=== October – December ===
Opening		Title	Director	Cast	Ref(s)
O C T O B E R	4	Listen to the Universe	Kei Ishikawa	Mayu Matsuoka, Tori Matsuzaka, Win Morisaki, Ouji Suzuka	
O C T O B E R	9	Her Blue Sky	Tatsuyuki Nagai, Tomohiko Ito	Ryo Yoshizawa, Shion Wakayama, Riho Yoshioka	
O C T O B E R	9	BlackFox	Kazuya Nomura, Keisuke Shinohara	Ayaka Nanase, Hana Sugisaki, Yō Taichi	
O C T O B E R	11	The Bucket List	Isshin Inudo, Yoji Yamada	Sayuri Yoshinaga, Yūki Amami, Tsuyoshi Muro, Hikari Mitsushima	
O C T O B E R	18	The Promised Land	Takahisa Zeze	Gō Ayano, Hana Sugisaki, Kōichi Satō, Nijirō Murakami, Reiko Kataoka, Asuka Kurosawa	
O C T O B E R	18	Special Actors!	Shinichiro Ueda	Kazuto Ōsawa, Hiroki Kono, Takuya Fuji, Ayu Kitaura	
O C T O B E R	25	Chō Shōnen Tanteidan NEO: Beginning	Shintaro Ashidzuka	Mahiro Takasugi, Gaku Sano, Mayu Hotta, Kiki Osamura, Mizuki Itagaki	
O C T O B E R	26	Saekano the Movie: Finale	Keiichi Kobayashi	Yoshitsugu Matsuoka, Kiyono Yasuno, Saori Ōnishi	
N O V E M B E R	1	After the Matinee	Hiroshi Nishitani	Masaharu Fukuyama, Yuriko Ishida, Yusuke Iseya, Yuki Sakurai, Haruka Kinami, Jun Fubuki	
N O V E M B E R	1	The First Supper	Shiro Tokiwa	Shōta Sometani, Erika Toda, Yōsuke Kubozuka, Yuki Saito (actress)	
N O V E M B E R	1	Closed Ward	Hideyuki Hirayama	Shōfukutei Tsurube II, Gō Ayano, Nana Komatsu	
N O V E M B E R	1	Black School Rules	Shintaro Sugawara	Shori Sato, Kaito Takahashi	
N O V E M B E R	8	One Night	Kazuya Shiraishi	Takeru Satoh, Ryohei Suzuki, Mayu Matsuoka, Yūko Tanaka	
N O V E M B E R	15	He Won't Kill, She Won't Die	Keiichi Kobayashi	Shotaro Mamiya, Hinako Sakurai, Yuri Tsunematsu, Mayu Hotta, Yumena Yanai, Yūtarō	
N O V E M B E R	15	The Japanese Doll	Tarō Miyaoka, Shinpei Yamazaki	Nao Kosaka, Riku Hagiwara, Moe Tsurumi, Shuka Kumazawa	
N O V E M B E R	15	Hell Girl	Kōji Shiraishi	Tina Tamashiro, Manami Hashimoto, Akaji Maro, Raiku	
N O V E M B E R	15	Shadowfall	Tetsuo Shinohara	Masayoshi Yamazaki, Machiko Ono, Takumi Kitamura Yuri Nakamura, Pistol Takehara	
N O V E M B E R	22	The 47 Ronin in Debt	Yoshihiro Nakamura	Shinichi Tsutsumi, Takashi Okamura, Satomi Ishihara, Sadao Abe	
N O V E M B E R	29	Human Lost: No Longer Human	Fuminori Kizaki, Katsuyuki Motohiro	Mamoru Miyano, Kana Hanazawa, Takahiro Sakurai, Jun Fukuyama	
N O V E M B E R	29	My Girlfriend is a Serial Killer	Kayoko Asakura	Yosuke Sugino, Haruka Fukuhara, Manami Enozawa	
D E C E M B E R	4	Santa Company 2	Kenji Itoso	Ayumi Fujimura, Yūki Kaji, Haruka Tomatsu, Rie Kugimiya	
D E C E M B E R	4	I Was a Secret Bitch!	Koichiro Miki	Yui Sakuma, Nijiro Murakami, Suzuka Ohgo, Yuta Koseki	
D E C E M B E R	6	Come Kiss Me at 0:00 AM	Takehiko Shinjō	Ryota Katayose, Kanna Hashimoto, Gordon Maeda, Alissa Yagi, Sae Okazaki	
D E C E M B E R	6	Lupin III: The First	Takashi Yamazaki	Kanichi Kurita, Kiyoshi Kobayashi, Daisuke Namikawa, Miyuki Sawashiro, Kōichi Yamadera, Suzu Hirose, Kōtarō Yoshida, Tatsuya Fujiwara	
D E C E M B E R	13	Yo-kai Watch Jam: Yo-Kai Academy Y	Shigeru Takahashi	Mutsumi Tamura, Marina Inoue, Aya Endō, Haruka Tomatsu	
D E C E M B E R	13	Talking the Pictures	Masayuki Suo	Ryo Narita, Yuina Kuroshima, Naoto Takenaka, Yutaka Takenouchi	
D E C E M B E R	13	The Shijinso Murders	Hisashi Kimura	Ryunosuke Kamiki, Minami Hamabe, Tomoya Nakamura	
D E C E M B E R	13	Seven Days War	Yūta Murano	Takumi Kitamura, Kyoko Yoshine, Rie Miyazawa	
D E C E M B E R	20	My Hero Academia: Heroes Rising	Kenji Nagasaki	Daiki Yamashita, Kenta Miyake, Nobuhiko Okamoto, Ayane Sakura	
D E C E M B E R	21	Kamen Rider Reiwa The First Generation	Teruaki Sugihara	Fumiya Takahashi, Ryutaro Okada, Noa Tsurushima, Hiroe Igeta, Daisuke Nakagawa, Shuya Sunagawa, So Okuno, Gaku Oshida, Shieri Ohata, Keisuke Watanabe, Rina Ikoma	
D E C E M B E R	25	Tora-san, Welcome Back	Yoji Yamada	Kiyoshi Atsumi, Chieko Baisho, Hidetaka Yoshioka	
D E C E M B E R	25	New Shinkalion the Movie	Takahiro Ikezoe	Ayane Sakura, Manami Numakura, Rie Murakawa, Yūji Ueda	

== See also ==
- 2019 in Japan
- 2019 in Japanese television
- List of 2019 box office number-one films in Japan
