= Safeplanet =

Thai indie-pop band

Safeplanet is a Thai indie-pop band of three people led by the main vocalist Thitiphat “A” Arthachinua a music that combines guitar pop with DIY ethic in opposition to the style. Safeplanet (Safe Planet) means "Our safe area, it's an area where we can perform our work comfortably.”

== Band members ==
- Thitipat "A" Arthachinda (Thai: ฐิติภัทร อรรถจินดา (เอเลี่ยน)) - Lead Vocals - guitarist
- Aphiwich "Doi" Khamfoo (Thai: อภิวิชญ์ คำฟู (ดอย)) - drummer

== History ==
=== The beginning ===
Safeplanet is made up of three people who are all studying music in the Faculty of Music and subject of jazz. ‘A’ studied at Silpakorn University. Doi and Yi studied at Mahidol University. The band was formed by former members of the band 'Shadow Flare', ‘A Thitipat Attchinda (Thai: เอ ฐิติภัทร อรรถจินดา)’ lead vocals – guitarist and 'Doi Aphiwit Khamfu (Thai: ดอย อภิวิชญ์ คำฟู)’ drummer and they are a back-up for Jelly Rocket band. As a result, a new band was formed by Doi invited ‘Yee Chayapan Chantranuson (Thai: ยี่ ชยปัญญ์ จันทรานุสนธิ์)' bassist, who was previously the back-up for Jelly Rocket band to record a song which would later become a member of Safeplanet. 'Safeplanet' is to describe a planet that is "Their secure zone with a comfortable environment in which we can perform ". They are a self-contained band that specializes in indie-pop music. They had a very first single named “Klong Dam (Thai: กล่องดำ)” which was released in 2016 and had a very popular song such as “Khamtop (Thai: คำตอบ)” and “Kot Khwam Chep Cham (Thai: กอดความเจ็บช้ำ) which are in “Safeboys” album. Also, they had a first concert which held on July 6, 2019, in the name of “Safeplanet Neonplanet Concert” at Montri Studio (Thai: มนตรี สตูดิโอ).

‘A Thitipat Attchinda (Thai: เอ ฐิติภัทร อรรถจินดา)’ lead vocals – guitarist: graduated with a bachelor's degree from Faculty of Music Silpakorn University. 'Doi Aphiwit Khamfu (Thai: ดอย อภิวิชญ์ คำฟู)’ drummer - graduated with a bachelor's degree from College of Music Mahidol University.‘Yee Chayapan Chantranuson (Thai: ยี่ ชยปัญญ์ จันทรานุสนธิ์)' bassist - graduated with a bachelor's degree from College of Music Mahidol University.

Safeplanet's identity: “Safeplanet's signature sound is guitar-banded. We use the guitar as a drive. And then there is a layer of chorus that is a unique singing. Consists of percussion We mix many types of music as if combining many pop music. type together Most of which, when incoming calls He will immediately know that it is us.” Safeplanet's identity: “The inspiration for making music comes from real events that we felt at the time. For example, the song “Khaeng Khuek” comes from the people next to me. And I want to encourage him like "I'll take you." The people beside me are my girlfriends, friends, and family. Other than my girlfriend Ket and all the fans, of course, he's the one next to us, without them there wouldn't be us.”

== Discography ==
Caption text
Year	Song title	Album name
2016	กล่องดำ	Safeboys
	โอยา (Oheya)	Safeboys
	ห้องกระจก (Mirror Room)	Safeboys
	ระบาย (Paint)	Safeboys
2017	ตัดสินใจ (Again)	Safeboys
	ดินแดน (Din Dan)	Safeboys
2018	แสงสว่าง (Strobe Light)	Safeboys
	คำตอบ (Answer)	Safeboys
2019	กอดความเจ็บช้ำ (Carry)	Safeboys
	ลอง (Try)	Safeboys
	ข้างกาย (With you)	Safeboys
	เพียงเธอ (Always)	Safeboys
	พริบตา (The Wind)	Cap, Capo, Cigarettes & Beer
2020	สิ่งที่เธอฝากไว้ (The Maze)	Cap, Capo, Cigarettes & Beer
	ไม่เคยเปลี่ยน (The Mountain)	Cap, Capo, Cigarettes & Beer
	ถ้าเธอได้รู้ (The Secret)	Cap, Capo, Cigarettes & Beer
	วันที่สวยงาม (To the Day)	Cap, Capo, Cigarettes & Beer
2021	โลกใบใหม่ (New World)	Cap, Capo, Cigarettes & Beer
	อย่างน้อย (Sunset)	Cap, Capo, Cigarettes & Beer
2022	นอนไม่หลับ (Melatonin)	Cap, Capo, Cigarettes & Beer
	Bon Voyage	Cap, Capo, Cigarettes & Beer
	ในเมื่อใจ (The Heart)	Cap, Capo, Cigarettes & Beer
	ดวงตะวัน (The Sun)	Cap, Capo, Cigarettes & Beer
	รู้เธอยังกังวล (My Worry)	Cap, Capo, Cigarettes & Beer
	Youth	Cap, Capo, Cigarettes & Beer
2023	ปล่อยมือ (The End)	-

== Tours ==
Neonplanet Concert (6 July 2019)

This is their first concert in five years since the debut of the song, which took place at Mon Tri Studio (Thai: มนตรีสตูดิโอ) and featured Anatomy Rabbit as a special guest. The concert's theme and title were inspired by classical space and neon.

Bon Voyage Concert (4 June 2023)

After completing their 2nd album 'Cap, Capo, Cigarettes & Beer', The band played their first arena-scale concert at Thunderdome Stadium in Muang Thong Thani, Celebrating their 8-year journey. The name 'Bon Voyage' is taken from the first song in the 2nd album.
