= Space Shower Music =

Japanese record label

- Type: Music publisher
- Industry: Japanese music
- Founded: September 14, 1999
- Headquarters: Tokyo, Japan
- Website: spaceshowermusic.com

Space Shower Music is a Japanese record label and talent agency owned by Space Shower Network, best known as the operator of Space Shower TV.

== History ==
The company was founded in 1999 as 3D Systems Kabushiki gaisha (スリーディーシステム株式会社設立), whose primary shareholder was Polystar. In 2004, Space Shower Network became a third party investor in 3D Systems, with the company being renamed BounDEE Kabushiki Gaisha (バウンディ株式会社) in 2006, and officially becoming a partner business of Space Shower. In 2011, BounDEE became a fully owned enterprise of the Space Shower Network, with the label being renamed Space Shower Music in 2014.

== Imprints ==
- BounDEE
- Cabron Music
- C.H.S
- Eninal
- Felicity
- HARDCORE TANO*C
- Newhere Music
- Silver Sun Records
- SKETCH UP! Rec.
- Smile19

== Artists ==
- Aaamyyy
- The Aprils
- Curly Giraffe
- Tommy Guerrero
- Haku
- Hifana
- ROTH BART BARON
- Ryoichi Higuchi
- Terumasa Hino
- Hitsuji Bungaku
- Humbert Humbert
- Hideki Kaji
- Nothing's Carved in Stone
- Masayoshi Ōishi
- Yasuyuki Okamura
- Pink Babies
- Scha Dara Parr
- Suchmos
- Takao Tajima
- Tempalay
