= Sharin no Uta =

"Sharin no Uta 車輪の唄"

Single by Bump of Chicken

from the album Yggdrasil
- B-side: "Yume no Kainushi", "Snow Smile: Ringing Version"
- Released: December 1, 2004
- Recorded: ???
- Genre: Rock
- Length: 4:31
- Label: Toy's Factory; TFCC-89121
- Songwriter: Fujiwara Motoo
- Producer: ???

Bump of Chicken singles chronology
"Only Lonely Glory" (2004)	"Sharin no Uta 車輪の唄" (2004)	"Planetarium" (2005)

"Sharin no Uta" (車輪の唄) is the ninth single by Bump of Chicken. The title track is from the album Yggdrasil (ユグドラシル). The second B-side is a remix of "Snow Smile", also from Yggdrasil.

== Track listing ==
All tracks written by Fujiwara Motoo.

1. "Sharin no Uta" (車輪の唄)
2. "Yume no Kainushi" (夢の飼い主)
3. "Snow Smile: Ringing Version" (スノースマイル: Ringing Version)
4. "Hoshi no Arpeggio" (星のアルペジオ) (Hidden track)

== Personnel ==
- Fujiwara Motoo — Guitar, vocals
- Masukawa Hiroaki — Guitar
- Naoi Yoshifumi — Bass
- Masu Hideo — Drums

== Chart performance ==
Chart	Peak Position
Oricon Weekly Charts	3
2005 Oricon Top 100 Singles	81
