= Namida no Furusato =

"Namida no Furusato 涙のふるさと"

Single by Bump of Chicken

from the album Orbital Period
- B-side: "Makka na Sora wo Mita Darou ka"
- Released: November 22, 2006
- Recorded: ???
- Genre: Rock
- Length: ??:??
- Label: Toy's Factory; TFCC-89191
- Songwriter: Fujiwara Motoo
- Producer: ???

Bump of Chicken singles chronology
"Karma/Supernova" (2005)	"Namida no Furusato 涙のふるさと" (2006)	"Hana no Na" (2007)

"Namida no Furusato" (涙のふるさと) is the twelfth single by Bump of Chicken, released on November 22, 2006. The title track is from the album Orbital Period.

== Track listing ==
1. "Namida no Furusato" (涙のふるさと) (Hometown of Tears) (Fujiwara Motoo)
2. "Makka na Sora wo Mita Darou ka" (真っ赤な空を見ただろうか) (Did You See the Red Sky?) (Fujiwara)
3. "Orusuban" (おるすばん) (House Sitter) (Hidden track)

== Personnel ==
- Fujiwara Motoo — Guitar, vocals
- Masukawa Hiroaki — Guitar
- Naoi Yoshifumi — Bass
- Masu Hideo — Drums

== Chart performance ==
Chart	Peak Position
Oricon Weekly Charts	1
2006 Oricon Top 100 Singles	35
