= Komatta Jii-san =

Japanese manga series

- Cover of Komatta Jii-san volume 1 by Enterbrain

困ったじいさん
- Genre: Comedy
- Manga
- Written by: Shinichirō Ōe
- Published by: Line; Enterbrain
- Imprint: Beam Comix
- Magazine: Line Manga Indies
- Original run: November 2018 – present
- Volumes: 1
- Anime television series
- Directed by: Hiroshi Namiki
- Music by: Hiroto Sasaki
- Studio: Kachidoki Studio
- Original network: BS NTV
- Original run: April 8, 2020 – July 1, 2020
- Episodes: 13

Komatta Jii-san (困ったじいさん; "Troublesome Old Man") is a Japanese comedy manga series by Shinichirō Ōe. It has been serialized online via Ōe's Twitter account, as well as Line's Line Manga Indies program, since November 2018 and has been collected in a single tankōbon volume by Enterbrain. An anime television series adaptation by Kachidoki Studio aired from April 8 to July 1, 2020.

== Characters ==
Old Man (じいさん, Jii-san)
Voiced by: Satoshi Hino
Old Lady (ばあさん, Baa-san)
Voiced by: Inori Minase
Narrator
Voiced by: Toshiyuki Morikawa

== Media ==
=== Anime ===
An anime television series adaptation was announced on December 17, 2019. The series is animated by Kachidoki Studio and directed by Hiroshi Namiki, with Yu Saito as sound director, and Hiroto Sasaki composing the music. It aired from April 8 to July 1, 2020, on BS NTV. The anime's theme song is "Jii-san no Love Love Scat" (じいさんのラブラブ▽スキャット, Jīsan no Rabu Rabu Sukyatto) performed by Satoshi Hino.
