= My Monster Secret =

Japanese manga series

- Japanese cover of the first volume of My Monster Secret, featuring Yōko Shiragami.

実は私は (Jitsu wa Watashi Wa)
- Genre: Romantic comedy
- Manga
- Written by: Eiji Masuda
- Published by: Akita Shoten
- English publisher: NA: Seven Seas
- Magazine: Weekly Shōnen Champion
- Original run: January 31, 2013 – February 16, 2017
- Volumes: 22
- Anime television series
- Directed by: Yasutaka Yamamoto
- Produced by: Mika Shimizu; Toshiaki Tanaka; Masahiro Sugasawa; Shunsuke Matsumura; Jun Nakajima; Shinobu Satō; Shingo Takegawa; Yūsuke Kubo
- Written by: Kenichi Yamashita
- Music by: Akito Matsuda
- Studio: TMS/3xCube
- Licensed by: NA: Discotek Media
- Original network: TV Tokyo, TVO, TVQ, TVh, TVA, TSC, AT-X
- Original run: July 6, 2015 – September 28, 2015
- Episodes: 13
- icon

My Monster Secret, known in Japan as Actually, I Am... (実は私は, Jitsu wa Watashi wa), is a Japanese manga series written and illustrated by Eiji Masuda. It was serialized in Akita Shoten's shōnen manga magazine Weekly Shōnen Champion from January 31, 2013, to February 16, 2017. Akita Shoten collected the series in 22 tankōbon volumes.

An anime television series adaptation ran from July to September 2015. AnimeLab has secured streaming rights in Australia and New Zealand.

Seven Seas Entertainment acquired the rights to translate and distribute the manga for North America, with the first volume being released in January 2016.

== Plot ==
Asahi Kuromine, a normal high school student who supposedly cannot keep a secret, finds his demeanor quickly challenged when he spots his classmate and crush, Youko Shiragami, unfurling a large pair of wings from her back when he tries to propose. He learns Youko is a vampire, and she is only able to attend a normal school on one condition: no one must discover her true identity. This secret becomes difficult to maintain, as Youko herself is an airhead and Asahi's childhood friend Mikan keeps bullying the two of them. Love is blooming between Asahi and Youko but things are not very easy. Later on, Asahi discovers more girls in his school with secrets of their own: a tiny alien who rides a human-sized exoskeleton of herself, a werewolf capable of switching gender at any depiction of a moon, a thousand-year-old demon who secretly runs the school, and more who not only pose a challenge as Asahi tries to maintain Youko's secret, but also secretly like Asahi and despise the idea of Asahi and Youko being a couple, thus trying to separate them.

== Characters ==
=== Main characters ===
Asahi Kuromine (黒峰 朝陽, Kuromine Asahi)
Voiced by: Natsuki Hanae
Asahi is a second year high school student who seems to be unable to keep a secret, so much his nickname is "leaky basket". He often acts as the narrator through his inner monologues. Asahi is also susceptible to projectile nosebleeds when confronted with perverse situations, earning the nickname "Eromine" from Yōko. He has a younger sister named Mei, who is barely mentioned in the story until much later on.
Yōko Shiragami (白神 葉子, Shiragami Yōko)
Voiced by: Yū Serizawa
Yōko is a classmate of Asahi and the daughter of a human and a vampire. Although she has long canine teeth, many other typical vampiric characteristics are downplayed, such as only getting tanned in sunlight or feeling guilty when entering a room uninvited. Yōko speaks in Kansai dialect, using honorifics to not expose her teeth. Despite initially coming across as haughty, she is bubbly and absent-minded on the outside.
Nagisa Aizawa (藍澤 渚, Aizawa Nagisa)
Voiced by: Inori Minase
Nagisa is a classmate of Asahi and Yōko as well as small alien riding a human-sized robotic exoskeleton of herself. She is usually meticulous and serious with her actions, though loses her composure when dealing with embarrassing situations. Nagisa has an older brother, Ryo, whom she initially respects and draws inspiration from, before learning he is less reliable than she initially realized.
Mikan Akemi (朱美 みかん, Akemi Mikan)
Voiced by: Reina Ueda
Mikan is a childhood friend of Asahi who always bullies him. She is president of the Newspaper Club and has used her position to turn it into a supermarket tabloid. However, most of the time, the newspaper club members do all the work for her. Mikan secretly likes Asahi, but perceives her lack of femininity as a barrier she cannot overcome, and prefers instead to bully and tease him. She has two younger brothers who occasionally appear in the series.
Shiho Shishido (紫々戸 獅穂, Shishido Shiho)
Voiced by: Aya Uchida
Shiho is the dominant personality, and is aware of everything occurs when Shirou is in control of her body. While Shirou has a crush on Yōko and attempts to discover if Asahi is aware of her secret, Shiho is more playful and amorous, deriving enjoyment from being perverse. She often tries to force Youko into admitting her true feelings towards Asahi, and having a perverted crush on Asahi, and tries to expose herself to him. While her father is also a wolfman, her mother is only shown in silhouette and is referred to as the "Charismatic Female Pervert".

=== Supporting characters ===
Shirō Shishido (獅狼)
Voiced by: Kenichi Miya
Shishido is Yōko's childhood friend and a wolfman. Initially appearing as Shirō, an intimidating man with sharp teeth. Upon seeing any depiction of The Moon, he transforms into Shiho, a busty, self-proclaimed pervert.
Akane Kōmoto (紅本 茜, Kōmoto Akane)
Voiced by: Mao Ichimichi
Principal of Asahi's high school and a thousand year-old demon who has the body of a young girl with demonic horns. Despite her age, she is often quick to exhibit childish tendencies, such as playing large-scale pranks on the people at school and quickly getting excited whenever she believes sweets are nearby. She takes special delight in ruining Akari's life when given the chance. As a demon, Akane is capable of magically transforming herself and others around her, as well as multiplying herself.
Akari Koumoto (紅本 明里, Kōmoto Akari)
Voiced by: Emi Nitta
Asahi's homeroom teacher and former delinquent known as "Akari of the Hundred Visits" due to responding violently after apparently being rejected by 100 boys across different schools. She is Akane's great-great-granddaughter. Her short temper and strong fighting ability allows her to rein in Akane's misbehavior.
Rin Kiryuin (黄龍院 凜, Kiryūin Rin)
Rin is a first high school student. She is secretly Asahi's and Mikan's time traveling granddaughter from the future. Rin is protective of Asahi, whom she treats like a grandfather, not adapting her behavior to his younger appearance.
Okada (岡田), Sakurada (桜田), and Shimada (嶋田)
Voiced by: Daisuke Hirakawa, Wataru Hatano and Hiro Shimono
Okada, Sakurada, and Shimada are Asahi's three male friends.
Genjirō Shiragami (白神 源二郎, Shiragami Genjirō) and Tōko Shiragami (白神 桐子, Shiragami Tōko)
Voiced by: Rikiya Koyama (Genjirō), Yōko Hikasa (Tōko)
Yōko's father and mother who had a high school romance similar to Yōko and Asahi. Genjirō is over-protective of his daughter, while Tōko often ends up reining in his behavior through serious situations.
Karen Shirogane (銀 華恋, Shirogane Karen)
Introduced as a demon, Karen is a fallen angel who lost her halo, which Akane uses as a light bulb without her knowledge. Honest and gentle to a fault, her attempts to be demonic are often seen as angelic yet annoying. She was Genjirō and Tōko's classmate, as well as current student council president, having retained the position for over 20 years at the request of Akane. Her feathers can invoke one of the seven deadly sins in whoever gets stuck with them.

Ryo Aizawa (藍澤 涼, Aizawa Ryō)

Nagisa's older brother, Ryo moves around in an exoskeleton in is the size of a human body. His exoskeleton is the body of a girl 'ghost' so Nagisa would not know he was in there. He is usually the victim of Shimada's continual flirtation, even to the point of almost kissing him.

Yuika Momochi (桃地 結香, Momochi Yuika)

Yuika is a ninja from a different time-period who tends to fall in love with the first guy she bumps into, including Asahi and Okada. However, her use of ninja equipment usually intimidates anyone she tries to attract. Revealed to be Shimada and Shiho's time traveling granddaughter.

Mei Kuromine (黒峰 鳴, Kuromine Mei)

Mei is Asahi's younger sister who is Yuika's somewhat supportive friend.

Saki Minagawa (水奈川 咲, Minagawa Saki)

A student representative of Mei and Yuika's class, Saki is a succubus who drains men's energy when seducing them. However, Saki herself has little in the way of skills or experience doing so.
Sen Kiryuin (Kiryūin Sen)
Sen is Vampire-Hunter who has no intention of actually hunting vampires. He occasionally imparts some advice to Asahi on how to deal with Yōko's vampire problems.
Shirayuki (白雪姫)
The principal of Morobare high school from Genjirō and Tōko's past, Shirayuki is a cruel person who feels absolute disgust at the thought of human and non-human species can coexist, believing it goes against the pride of non-humans.

== Media ==
=== Manga ===
Written and illustrated by Eiji Masuda, My Monster Secret has been serialized in the manga anthology Weekly Shōnen Champion from January 31, 2013, to February 16, 2017, and collected into 22 volumes by Akita Shoten. Seven Seas Entertainment has licensed the manga for North America under the title My Monster Secret and published the first volume on January 12, 2016.

==== Volume list ====
| No. | Original release date | Original ISBN | North American release date | North American ISBN |
|---|---|---|---|---|
| 01 | June 7, 2013 | 978-4-25-322168-9 | January 12, 2016 | 978-1-62-692238-9 |
Chapters 1-7
| 02 | August 8, 2013 | 978-4-25-322169-6 | April 19, 2016 | 978-1-62-692259-4 |
Chapters 8-16
| 03 | October 8, 2013 | 978-4-25-322170-2 | July 19, 2016 | 978-1-62-692291-4 |
Chapters 17-25
| 04 | December 6, 2013 | 978-4-25-322171-9 | October 18, 2016 | 978-1-62-692345-4 |
Chapters 26-34
| 05 | February 7, 2014 | 978-4-25-322172-6 | January 10, 2017 | 978-1-62-692385-0 |
Chapters 35-43
| 06 | May 8, 2014 | 978-4-25-322173-3 | April 25, 2017 | 978-1-62-692455-0 |
Chapters 44-52
| 07 | July 8, 2014 | 978-4-25-322174-0 | July 25, 2017 | 978-1-626925-03-8 |
Chapters 53-61
| 08 | September 8, 2014 | 978-4-25-322175-7 | November 14, 2017 | 978-1-626925-81-6 |
Chapters 62-70
| 09 | December 8, 2014 | 978-4-25-322176-4 | January 16, 2018 | 978-1-626926-75-2 |
Chapters 71-79
| 10 | February 6, 2015 | 978-4-25-322177-1 | April 10, 2018 | 978-1-626927-24-7 |
Chapters 80-88
| 11 | April 8, 2015 | 978-4-25-322521-2 | June 26, 2018 | 978-1-626928-06-0 |
Chapters 89-97
| 12 | July 8, 2015 | 978-4-25-322522-9 | August 28, 2018 | 978-1-626928-52-7 |
Chapters 98-106
| 13 | September 8, 2015 | 978-4-25-322523-6 | October 30, 2018 | 978-1-626929-20-3 |
Chapters 107-115
| 14 | November 6, 2015 | 978-4-25-322524-3 | December 18, 2018 | 978-1-626929-71-5 |
Chapters 116-124
| 15 | January 8, 2016 | 978-4-25-322525-0 | March 26, 2019 | 978-1-642750-13-3 |
Chapters 125-133
| 16 | April 8, 2016 | 978-4-25-322526-7 | May 28, 2019 | 978-1-642750-81-2 |
Chapters 134-142
| 17 | June 8, 2016 | 978-4-25-322527-4 | August 6, 2019 | 978-1-642751-20-8 |
Chapters 143-151
| 18 | August 8, 2016 | 978-4-25-322528-1 | November 12, 2019 | 978-1-642757-28-6 |
Chapters 152-160
| 19 | October 7, 2016 | 978-4-25-322529-8 | January 28, 2020 | 978-1-645051-88-6 |
Chapters 161-169
| 20 | December 8, 2016 | 978-4-25-322530-4 | April 21, 2020 | 978-1-645052-38-8 |
Chapters 170-178
| 21 | February 8, 2017 | 978-4-25-322801-5 | September 1, 2020 | 978-1-645055-03-7 |
Chapters 179-187
| 22 | March 8, 2017 | 978-4-25-322802-2 | December 22, 2020 | 978-1-645057-41-3 |
Chapters 188-196

=== Anime ===
The anime adaptation of My Monster Secret premiered on July 6, 2015, in Japan and streaming to North American audiences via Crunchyroll as Actually, I am.... the same day. The opening theme is "Himitsu o Chōdai" (ひみつをちょーだい, Give Me Secrets) by Ars Magna and the ending theme is "Ienai Ienai" (言えない言えない, Can't Say It, Can't Say It) by Hilcrhyme. Additionally, three character song volumes were released: Volume 1 featuring Yōko Shiragami (Yū Serizawa) and Shiho Shishido (Aya Uchida), Volume 2 featuring Nagisa Aizawa (Inori Minase) and Mikan Akemi (Reina Ueda), and Volume 3 featuring Akane Kōmoto (Mao Ichimichi) and Akari Kōmoto (Emi Nitta).

The anime is licensed by Discotek Media. It was released on DVD and Blu-ray in February 2017.

==== Episode list ====
| No. | Title | Original release date |
|---|---|---|
| 1 | "I'll Confess!" "Kokuhaku Shiyō!" (告白しよう!) | July 6, 2015 |
Asahi Kuromine, a high school boy who has trouble keeping a secret from anyone, has a crush on his cool and reserved classmate, Yōko Shiragami. Yōko admits to Asahi that she is a vampire, but could only come to school if she hid her true identity from everyone. Asahi swears that he will be her friend and keep her secret safe. Meanwhile, Newspaper Club head Mikan Akemi plans to see how Asahi's confession went, and Nagisa appears to be spying on Asahi from afar.
| 2 | "I'll Keep This Secret!" "Himitsu o Mamorō!" (秘密を守ろう!) | July 13, 2015 |
Asahi tells his friends that he decided to be just friends with Yōko for now. Meanwhile, Nagisa reflects on how she brutally rejected Asahi the previous summer to prevent him from getting too close to her, but soon acts jealous after seeing him with Yōko. When Yōko accidentally reveals her wings as Nagisa steps into the room, Nagisa also accidentally reveals herself to be a tiny alien, stepping out of her human-sized "External Unit" while holding a tiny raygun at Yōko.
| 3 | "Beware Childhood Friends!" "Osananajimi o Kiotsukeyō!" (幼馴染に気をつけよう!) | July 20, 2015 |
Asahi decides to stop for a brief visit at Yōko's student apartment, but gets a call from Nagisa that Mikan managed to get past her and run to Yōko's house. Mikan is accidentally knocked unconscious after being buried under a pile of Yōko's junk from the closet, but decides to photoshop a romantic encounter between Asahi and Yōko and threatens to display it throughout the school. Asahi confronts Mikan on the rooftop and begs her not to do it, but the pleading only makes her stronger, so Asahi takes the opposite route and decides to let her put up the pictures.
| 4 | "Help the Class Rep!" "Iinchō o Tasukeyō!" (委員長を助けよう！) | July 27, 2015 |
After taking shelter in a gym storage shed, Nagisa mysteriously grows to human size and is embarrassed about revealing her antenna to Asahi while Mikan, Shimada, Yōko hunt them down. A mysterious horned lady magically returns Nagisa to her normal size, while Asahi and Yōko clear up their misunderstanding after school.
| 5 | "Let's Go on a... Date?" "Dēto? Shiyō!" (デート？しよう！) | August 3, 2015 |
After discovering that UV rays from sunlight cause Yōko's skin to instantly tan, Nagisa decides to train her into dodging sunlight on her route to and from school. Asahi studies about vampire weaknesses while Nagisa encourages Yōko to do a field test with her new training. Later that evening, Yōko notes that their outing was similar to the relationship that her own parents had with each other, to the point where they even attended her current school together. Meanwhile, Yōko's father is suspicious of Yōko's new boyfriend, and tasks the werewolf Shiro Shishido with bringing her back home if her secret has been revealed.
| 6 | "Beware of the Wolf Man!" "Ookamiotoko ni Chuui Shiyō!" (狼男に注意しよう！) | August 10, 2015 |
While returning home from the amusement park, Asahi and Yōko encounter a scary wolfman with fangs. Yōko recognizes him as her childhood friend Shiro, but he threatens Asahi anyway. When Shiro sees the moon in the evening sky, he ends up transforming into a sexy lady named Shiho, who claims the dominant personality in the body she shares with Shiro. The next day, Shiho appears in Nagisa's class as a transfer student, introducing herself as "a pervert".
| 7 | "Let's Get Sexy!" "Sekushī ni Narō!" (セクシーになろう！) | August 17, 2015 |
Akane and Akari decide to have a "sexy" contest in the empty school gym, where Shiho acts as the host while Asahi is forced to be the judge through his nosebleed reactions. Meanwhile, Nagisa starts tracking mysterious demonic energy from her cat-like spacecraft elsewhere in the city. In multiple contests, Yōko and Akane try to one-up each other to prove their sexiness, except Asahi keeps getting the strongest reaction from Shiho's actions. The contest ends with Yōko and Akane blowing up the gym in a large explosion and sending Nagisa's spacecraft flying from the shockwave.
| 8 | "Let's Save the World!" "Sekai o Sukuou!" (世界を救おう！) | August 24, 2015 |
Asahi finds out he has to retake a cooking class, having missed the previous one. He is delighted to find out that Yōko, Nagisa, and Shiho are joining him in making curry. However, Asahi soon finds out that those three girls have trouble making it. Nagisa's directions lead her to make a chocolate cake, which is accidentally tossed out a nearby window where Akane catches it with her horn. After taking a bite, she falls in love with it. Even as Akane tries copying herself to reach Nagisa's chocolate, the other girls eventually fought her clones off until she loses enough focus that Nagisa's comrades in outer space force the asteroid to make a U-turn, saving Earth from destruction.
| 9 | "Let's Put On Our Swimsuits!" "Mizugi ni Kikaeyō!" (水着に着替えよう！) | August 31, 2015 |
Asahi gets up the nerve to invite Yōko to the pool, where he teaches her how to swim. Yōko tells Asahi about how her parents learned to swim and how her life has changed for the better since she and Asahi met.
| 10 | "Let's Be Honest!" "Sunao ni Narō!" (素直になろう！) | September 7, 2015 |
Okada, Sakurada, and Shimada invite Asahi and Yoko to join them at a buffet restaurant. When Yōko is reluctant for fear of revealing her secret, Asahi convinces her to eat.
| 11 | "Let's Go to the Summer Festival!" "Natsumatsuri ni Ikō!" (夏祭りに行こう！) | September 14, 2015 |
Asahi and Nagisa were invited by Yōko, Shimada, Oka, and Sakura to the Summer Festival. However, Yōko tricked them into together on them spending an exciting time "alone together". She and Shiho follow Asahi and Nagisa around to watch what they do together. While trying to make the atmosphere less awkward, Asahi invites Nagisa to play at the shooting gallery. Yōko becomes flustered while watching the two of them play, and loses track of where they went.
| 12 | "Let's Stop This Confession!" "Kokuhaku o Soshi Shiyō!" (告白を阻止しよう！) | September 21, 2015 |
After the incident at the Summer Festival, Yōko has been avoiding Asahi, unaware of how she felt about it. He continues to do things together with her, but she runs away before they could. Shiho talks with Youko about being more honest about her own feelings.
| 13 | "Let's Go Home Together!" "Issho ni Kaerō!" (一緒に帰ろう！) | September 28, 2015 |
Asahi, Akari, Nagisa, Shiho, and Akane are hampered by Akari's refusal to exceed the speed limit and risk damaging her new car. Akane knocks out Akari and uses her powers to take control of the car, but ends up destroying it in the process. Asahi, Nagisa, and Shiho break into the mansion, and are confronted by Yōko's father Genjirō. The next morning, Akari and Akane pick up the students (Akari made Akane pay for a new car in full). Genjirō pretends that he does not care that Youko is leaving, but runs after the car waving goodbye.

== Reception ==
The manga had 1.5 million copies in print as of March 2016.
