= Tentai Kansoku =

"Tentai Kansoku 天体観測"

Single by Bump of Chicken

from the album Jupiter
- B-side: "Bye Bye, Thank You"
- Released: March 14, 2001
- Recorded: Japan
- Genre: Rock
- Length: 4:24
- Label: Toy's Factory; TFCC-87080
- Songwriter: Fujiwara Motoo
- Producer: self produce

Bump of Chicken singles chronology
"Diamond" (2000)	"Tentai Kansoku 天体観測" (2001)	"Harujion" (2001)

"Tentai Kansoku" (天体観測) is the third single by Bump of Chicken. The title track is from the album Jupiter. "Tentai Kansoku" was used as the second ending theme for Teasing Master Takagi-san: The Movie (2022), covered by the main character's voice actress, Rie Takahashi. A parody of this song was sung by Tadano from Komi Can't Communicate (2021).

== Track listing ==
All tracks written by Fujiwara Motoo except track 3.

1. "Tentai Kansoku" (天体観測)
2. "Bye Bye, Thank You!!" (バイバイサンキュー)
3. "H・I・R・O・W・A・K・I" (Hidden track)

== Personnel ==
- Fujiwara Motoo — Guitar, vocals
- Masukawa Hiroaki — Guitar
- Naoi Yoshifumi — Bass
- Masu Hideo — Drums

== Chart performance ==
Chart	Peak Position
Oricon Weekly Charts	3
2001 Oricon Top 100 Singles	26

== Certifications ==
Region	Certification	Certified units/sales
Japan (RIAJ)	Silver	30,000,000^{†}
^{†} Streaming-only figures based on certification alone.
