= Tsuredure Children =

Japanese manga and anime series

- The cover of the first volume featuring Saki Kanda (left) and Haruhiko Takase (right) from the first chapter

徒然チルドレン (Tsurezure Chirudoren)
- Genre: Romantic comedy
- Manga
- Written by: Toshiya Wakabayashi
- Published by: Kodansha
- English publisher: NA: Kodansha USA
- Magazine: Bessatsu Shōnen Magazine; (August 9, 2014 – March 9, 2015); Weekly Shōnen Magazine; (April 15, 2015 – July 11, 2018)
- Original run: August 9, 2014 – July 11, 2018
- Volumes: 12
- Anime television series
- Directed by: Hiraku Kaneko
- Produced by: NAS
- Written by: Tatsuhiko Urahata
- Music by: Tenmon
- Studio: Studio Gokumi
- Licensed by: Crunchyroll
- Original network: Tokyo MX, Sun TV, BS11
- Original run: July 4, 2017 – September 19, 2017
- Episodes: 12
- icon

Tsuredure Children (Japanese: 徒然チルドレン, Hepburn: Tsurezure Chirudoren; transl. "Tedious Children") is a Japanese four-panel manga written and illustrated by Toshiya Wakabayashi. It was serialized in Kodansha's Bessatsu Shōnen Magazine from August 2014 to March 2015, and transferred to Weekly Shōnen Magazine, where it ran from April 2015 to July 2018. It was compiled into twelve tankōbon volumes.

An anime adaptation by Studio Gokumi aired from July to September 2017.

== Plot ==
Tsuredure Children tells various romantic stories about how it is hard to say "I love you", between young students attending the same high school, in an omnibus format. The characters in each story are connected to each other through their various friendships.

== Characters ==
=== Second year ===
Haruhiko Takase (高瀬 春彦, Takase Haruhiko)
Voiced by: Kentarō Kumagai (Japanese); Stephen Sanders (English)
Class 2-1, Haruhiko is a soccer club member alongside Sugawara. He is interested in his classmate Saki Kanda and waits for her to actually confess her feelings.
Saki Kanda (神田 沙希, Kanda Saki)
Voiced by: Haruka Miyake (Japanese); Skyler McIntosh (English)
Class 2-1, Saki is a member of the soft tennis club. She is in love with Haruhiko Takase and makes repeated unsuccessful attempts to confess. She is good friends with Yuki Minagawa and seeks advice from her.
Jun Furuya (古屋 純, Furuya Jun)
Voiced by: Kōhei Amasaki (Japanese); Dallas Reid (English)
Class 2-1, Jun is the straightlaced member of the broadcasting club. He is regularly confessed to by his classmate Yuki Minagawa, but due to her easygoing personality, he is never able to tell whether Yuki is serious. Jun eventually returns her feelings and they become a couple.
Yuki Minagawa (皆川 由紀, Minagawa Yuki)
Voiced by: Kana Hanazawa (Japanese); Sara Ragsdale (English)
Class 2-1, Yuki is a member of the soft tennis club. She is the class representative, but often delegates her tasks to Jun Furuya to slack off and spend time with him. A girl with a lot of friends with the impression of being a playgirl, Yuki consistently confesses to Jun, using various riddles to express her affections in the hopes he'll reciprocate. Jun eventually returns her feelings and they become a couple.
Takurō Sugawara (菅原 卓郎, Sugawara Takurō)
Voiced by: Kaito Ishikawa (Japanese); Anthony Bowling (English)
Class 2-4, Takurō is a member of the soccer club who is nicknamed "Sugayan". He has long been in love with his classmate Chizuru Takano due to her helpful nature. He briefly gives up on his feelings after concluding she is not ready for love, but is unable to let them go.
Chizuru Takano (高野 千鶴, Takano Chizuru)
Voiced by: Inori Minase (Japanese); Sarah Wiedenheft (English)
Class 2-4, Chizuru is a girl who thinks of herself as unfun and gloomy. When her classmate Takurō Sugawara helped her reach a bus station after a rain shower hit and attempted a confession, Chizuru thought that Takurō just wanted to make her feel better. Although she is unaware of his feelings, as well as her own, she is still grateful for what he did for her and they strike up a friendship. She later develops feelings for Sugawara and often stares at him longingly.
Takeru Gōda (剛田 武, Gōda Takeru)
Voiced by: Tomoaki Maeno (Japanese); Ricco Fajardo (English)
Class 2-4, Goda is a stoic, dense guy. He begins dating Kamine after she confesses to him, but isn't good with communicating his feelings to her and tends to create misunderstandings between them.
Ayaka Kamine (上根 綾香, Kamine Ayaka)
Voiced by: Yui Ogura (Japanese); Kristi Kang (English)
Class 2-4, Kamine is an emotional and kind-hearted girl. She confesses to Goda and begins dating him, but his dense nature makes it difficult for Kamine to move their relationship forward. She is shown to be friends with Takano.
Chiaki Uchimura (内村 千秋, Uchimura Chiaki)
Voiced by: Seiichirō Yamashita (Japanese); Kyle Igneczi (English)
Class 2-4, Chiaki is a goofy guy that likes to joke around with Kana, often playing the funny man in their comedy bits. He was unaware that he and Kana were dating for the past year until Kana pointed it out to him. After that, he tries to take their relationship more seriously, but comedic situations make it almost impossible for him to make any moves on Kana.
Kana Ījima (飯島 香菜, Ījima Kana)
Voiced by: Akari Kitō (Japanese); Alison Viktorin (English)
Class 2-4, Kana is a goofy girl who likes to play off Chiaki's jokes, often playing the straight man in their comedy bits. She believed that she and Chiaki were dating for the past year until she realized he thought her confession was a joke. She tries to push their relationship forward, but comedic situations disrupt those plans. She is good friends with Kazuko, as is among those who confide in her.
Ayane Matsuura (松浦 彩音, Matsuura Ayane)
Voiced by: Ayumi Mano (Japanese); Alexis Tipton (English)
Class 2-4, Ayane is a drama club member who got rejected by her crush and was comforted by Katori, much to her dismay. She appears to be friends with Sugawara.
Chiyo Kurihara (栗原 ちよ, Kurihara Chiyo)
Voiced by: Ai Kakuma (Japanese); Mikaela Krantz (English)
Class 2-1, Chiyo is a girl who often sees Yamane on the bus and became interested in him. After he helped her from being molested, she became more bold and started frequently asking him out in the hopes of starting a relationship with him, but their mutually low self-confidence hampers this. She eventually succeeds in confessing at a comiket, and they become a couple. She is a cooking club member.
Takao Yamane (山根 隆夫, Yamane Takao)
Voiced by: Hiro Shimono (Japanese); Derick Snow (English)
Class 2-7, Yamane is an otaku who has had a crush on Chiyo after the two rode the same bus together. After he helped Chiyo from almost being molested at a bus, Chiyo began frequently asking him out, but Yamane's low self-confidence stemming from his nerdy persona and "derpy" face hamper this. Chiyo eventually succeeds in confessing at a comiket, and they become a couple.
Tomomichi Motoyama (本山 友道, Motoyama Tomomichi)
Voiced by: Soichiro Hoshi (Japanese); Aaron Dismuke (English)
Class 2-7, Motoyama is Yamane's otaku friend, who displays a hatred for girls for not appreciating his and Yamane's looks, but comes to appreciate Chiyo for not falling under this. After learning about Yamane and Chiyo's mutual attraction, he tries to assist them with varying results.
Kazuko Hosokawa (細川 数子, Hosokawa Kazuko)
Voiced by: Rie Murakawa (Japanese); Michelle Rojas (English)
Class 2-4, Kazuko is a girl who is frequently consulted for love advice but has never experienced it herself. This changed when she met Katori and fell in love with him.

=== Third year ===
Masafumi Akagi (赤木 正文, Akagi Masafumi)
Voiced by: Kenshō Ono (Japanese); Austin Tindle (English)
Class 3-8, Akagi is the student council president who caught Ryōko smoking on school grounds red-handed and blackmailed her into becoming his girlfriend in order to keep his mouth shut. In reality, he had been interested in her for a long time and used the smoking incident as an excuse to get closer. Despite his stuffy, serious appearance, he is a Casanova when it comes to Ryōko.
Ryōko Kaji (梶 亮子, Kaji Ryōko)
Voiced by: Ayane Sakura (Japanese); Felecia Angelle (English)
Class 3-8, Ryōko is a girl who looks like a delinquent, who often distances herself from her classmates and smokes after school. Despite her appearance, Ryōko is actually an innocent tsundere and gets flustered when Akagi flirts with her.
Shin'ichi Katori (香取 慎一, Katori Shin'ichi)
Voiced by: Daisuke Namikawa (Japanese); Kyle Phillips (English)
Class 3-5, Katori is a flamboyant boy who appears whenever love advice is needed, though he is not attracted to anyone himself. He is the president of the drama club. Often calling himself a "Dating Master" while only giving those who need his advice hints about what to do. His actions have varying results, with people either blowing him off or becoming entranced by him.
Satsuki Sasahara (笹原 さつき, Sasahara Satsuki)
Voiced by: Maaya Uchida (Japanese); Jeannie Tirado (English)
Class 3-2, Satsuki is a pink-haired girl with twin buns and a hyperactive personality. Despite having no interest in astronomy, she joined the Astronomy Club because she had a crush on Hideki. After he graduated, Satsuki became the only member of the club.
Erika Shibasaki (柴崎 絵里香, Shibasaki Erika)
Voiced by: Miyu Komaki
Shibasaki is a member of the Tea Ceremony Club. In the manga, she joins the Light Music Club under the pseudonym, "Miss Wabisabi", despite all of her teammates knowing her identity. She has dark, short green hair and straight bangs, and she always wears a red headband. She started dating Ubukata after he confessed that she was the only one for him.

=== First year ===
Hotaru Furuya (古屋 ほたる, Furuya Hotaru)
Voiced by: Haruka Tomatsu (Japanese); Jad Saxton (English)
Class 1-3, Hotaru is Jun's younger sister with a brother complex. She hates everyone who gets close to her brother, particularly Yuki Minagawa due to her also being attracted to Jun, while Yuki seems to have fun teasing her. After some time, she goes easy on Yuki.
Yūki Kaga (加賀 優樹, Kaga Yūki)
Voiced by: Yuki Hashimoto (Japanese); Garret Storms (English)
Class 1-6, Yūki is a first-year student who was forced to join the astronomy club by Satsuki and ended up developing feelings for her. But after he learned that Satsuki already had a boyfriend he began dating Nanase.
Kaoru Nanase (七瀬 薫, Nanase Kaoru)
Voiced by: Nana Inami (Japanese); Madeleine Morris (English)
Class 1-9, Kaoru is Yūki's childhood friend who is in love with him but has tsundere tendencies. She followed him and joined the astronomy club, where she eventually confessed to him, and they eventually started dating.

=== Others ===
Hideki Yukawa (湯川 英樹, Yukawa Hideki)
Voiced by: Daisuke Ono (Japanese); J. Michael Tatum (English)
Hideki was an astronomy club member along with Satsuki. He is a serious person who doesn't seem to take Satsuki's confessions as real and easily becomes annoyed with it. Before his graduation, it turns out that he likes Satsuki's confessions all along. He is now a college student at a rural town and is in long distance relationship with Satsuki.

== Media ==
=== Manga ===
Wakabayashi originally started publishing the story online in 2012 without actually giving it a title; it became known simply as "Toshiya Wakabayashi's 4-koma comic collection". Afterward, it started serialization in Kodansha's Bessatsu Shōnen Magazine on August 9, 2014, and was published in the magazine until March 9, 2015. The manga was transferred to Weekly Shōnen Magazine starting on April 15, 2015. with entirely redrawn art. The series ended on July 11, 2018, and has been collected into 12 tankōbon volumes.

In North America, Kodansha USA has started digitally publishing an English version.

==== Volume list ====
No.	Original release date	Original ISBN	English release date	English ISBN
1	August 16, 2014	978-4-06-395168-4	April 25, 2017	978-1-68-233685-4
2	January 9, 2015	978-4-06-395301-5	August 22, 2017	978-1-68-233752-3
3	June 17, 2015	978-4-06-395426-5	September 26, 2017	978-1-68-233753-0
4	December 17, 2015	978-4-06-395515-6	October 24, 2017	978-1-68-233754-7
5	April 15, 2016	978-4-06-395647-4	November 28, 2017	978-1-68-233918-3
6	August 17, 2016	978-4-06-395735-8	December 19, 2017	978-1-68-233919-0
7	February 17, 2017	978-4-06-395849-2	February 13, 2018	978-1-64-212129-2
8	June 16, 2017	978-4-06-395956-7	March 13, 2018	978-1-64-212169-8
9	October 17, 2017	978-4-06-510209-1	May 29, 2018	978-1-64-212250-3
10	November 17, 2017	978-4-06-510391-3	June 26, 2018	978-1-64-212292-3
11	March 16, 2018	978-4-06-511064-5	November 27, 2018	978-1-64-212555-9
12	August 17, 2018	978-4-06-511794-1	March 12, 2019	978-1-64-212709-6

=== Anime ===
A TV anime adaptation was announced in February 2017. Studio Gokumi produced the anime with Hiraku Kaneko directing, series scripts is written by Tatsuhiko Urahata, and Etsuko Sumimoto is the character designer adapting Wakabayashi's original designs. The anime aired from July 4 (Note: A 15-minute long episodes.) to September 19, 2017, on Tokyo MX, Sun TV, and BS11. NAS produced the anime. Inori Minase performed the opening theme titled "Ai Mai Moko" (アイマイモコ) while Yui Ogura performed the ending theme titled "Dear". The anime episodes were released as DVDs bundled with the limited edition of manga volume 9, 10, and 11, each contains 4 episodes. Crunchyroll simulcast the series with original Japanese version and English subtitles, while Funimation streamed the series' English dub in North America.

==== Episode list ====
No.	Official English title (Note: All English episode titles are taken from Crunchyroll.) Japanese title	Original release date
1	"Confession" "Kokuhaku" (告白)	July 4, 2017
Saki Kanda attempts to confess to Haruhiko Takase, but fails to confess properly. Yuki Minagawa confesses to Jun Furuya, but he is not sure about starting a relationship with her. The student council president Masafumi Akagi catches Ryōko Kaji smoking. He then asks her for a kiss in exchange for not reporting her, which she agrees to. Satsuki Sasahara and her senior Hideki Yukawa, astronomy club members, see the stars together for the last time before Hideki graduates.
2	"Spring" "Haru" (春)	July 11, 2017
Jun's younger sister Hotaru, who is possessive toward her brother, gets between him and Yuki. Yūki Kaga tries to find a club to join and is persuaded to join the astronomy club by Satsuki, on whom he develops a crush. Ayaka Kamine attempts to confess to Takeru Gōda, but has trouble due to Takeru's stoic and dense personality. Takurō Sugawara walks home with Chizuru Takano, but she fails to see his hints that he is interested in her.
3	"Point-Blank Relationship" "Shikin Kyori Ren'ai" (至近距離恋愛)	July 18, 2017
Kana Ījima thinks she and her goofy friend Chiaki Uchimura have been dating for a year, but is shocked to learn that he thought her earlier confession to him was a joke. After being rejected by her crush, Ayane Matsuura receives unwanted help from self-proclaimed "dating master" Shin'ichi Katori. Takao Yamane is nervous about going out to lunch with his crush Chiyo Kurihara as thanks for saving her from a molester. Takurō helps Chizuru clean up after school, but has a misunderstanding with her while trying to talk about his feelings.
4	"Romantic Comedy" "Rabu Komedi" (ラブコメディ)	July 25, 2017
Chiaki and Kana run into complications while trying to have sex for the first time. Ryōko confronts Masafumi about him forcing her to be his girlfriend, and Masafumi admits he has feelings for her. After dodging the issue for months, Jun becomes concerned when Yuki seems eager for an answer to her confession. Chizuru's friend Noriko Yoshinaga asks Chizuru to deliver a love letter from her to Takurō, but Takurō rejects her, saying he already has a crush on someone else.
5	"Watching You from Afar" "Tōku kara Kimi o Miteru" (遠くから君を見てる)	August 1, 2017
Haruhiko and Saki attempt to confess their feelings to each other via text message, with disastrous results. Yūki invites his old friend and neighbor Kaoru Nanase to the astronomy club, but Kaoru becomes agitated with him after noticing his crush on Satsuki. She reveals she has long had a crush on Yūki herself and ends up kissing him in front of Satsuki, much to everyone's embarrassment. Ayaka wonders if Takeru really cares for her, as he seems to have grown distant since her confession.
6	"We Don't Need Girls" "Oretachi ni onna wa iranai" (俺達に女はいらない)	August 8, 2017
As they study together, Ryōko asks Masafumi why he is attracted to her. Chiaki and Kana become awkward with each other while doing a comedy bit together. Chiyo makes a movie date with Takao, but Takao tries to hide this from his friend Tomomichi Motoyama. Kazuko Hosokawa is visited by Shin'ichi and ends up falling for him.
7	"It's All the Fever's Fault" "Zenbu Netsu no Sei" (全部熱のせい)	August 15, 2017
Hotaru has a text conversation with Yuki on Jun's phone, which Yuki playfully goes along with. Ayaka asks Takeru to tell her that he genuinely loves her, which he finds difficult. Haruhiko wonders what to do about his recent blunder with Saki and receives some helpful advice from Shin'ichi. Chizuru struggles to understand her growing attraction to Takurō.
8	"Bruised-Up Angel" "Kizu-darake no Tenshi" (傷だらけの天使)	August 22, 2017
Ayaka tries to become more intimate with Takeru and ends up sharing her first kiss with him. When news of this reaches Chiaki and Kana, Kana asks why their relationship has not progressed the same way; and Chiaki ends up clumsily attempting to kiss her. Ryōko becomes incensed when Masafumi asks to fondle her in the library. Kazuko finds Shin'ichi badly bruised under a tree and seizes the chance to make a move on him.
9	"Square One" "Furidashi" (ふりだし)	August 29, 2017
Takurō and Chizuru repeatedly glance at each other during swim class. Haruhiko and Saki address their recent miscommunication and decide to become friends again, though each still harbors feelings for the other. Ayaka hopes Takeru will kiss her again due to her coughing during their first kiss; but Takeru is hesitant, thinking the first kiss was too forward. Jun has decided about going out with Yuki, but he becomes frustrated when she has trouble being serious with him.
10	"Lovers" "Koibito-tachi" (恋人たち)	September 5, 2017
Chiyo meets Takao behind the school to give him homemade pudding, and he brings Tomomichi along for support. Ayaka gets jealous when she sees Takeru with other girls; and Chiaki and Kana later see the two being openly romantic in the park, noting how much they have both changed. Chiaki invites Kana to his house in an attempt to finally kiss her, but she gets mad and breaks off their relationship when he kisses her after pretending to be drunk.
11	"Tuning" "Chūningu" (チューニング)	September 12, 2017
During music practice, Chizuru finds herself getting distracted and watching Takurō out the window while he plays soccer. Noriko suggests Chizuru may have a crush; and while Chizuru denies this at first, she starts to wonder when Ayaka describes her initial crush on Takeru as being similar to Chizuru's experiences. Ayaka also mentions a rumor that Takurō has a crush on Chizuru, flustering her even more. Kana has been avoiding Chiaki since breaking up with him, though he continually texts apologies to her. When he sends one last text asking if he can call Kana, her excitement causes her to drop her phone in the bathtub and short it out before she can read the text. Chiaki calls Kana anyway; and although Kana's mother briefly gets her phone working again, it dies during the call, leading Chiaki to think Kana has rejected him. Haruhiko and Saki remain nervous around each other as exams begin, but Haruhiko eases the situation when he gives Saki extra pencil lead. Ryōko struggles as she starts her college entrance exams; and Masafumi resists the urge to go help her, while her classmate Erika Shibasaki offers her reassurance.
12	"Summer Begins" "Natsu ga hajimaru" (夏が始まる)	September 19, 2017
The second-year boys take part in a soccer match, while their female classmates watch and cheer on their respective crushes. When the soccer ball goes flying toward Kana's head, Chiaki blocks it with his face, at which point Kana starts cheering for him as well. Several students plan a summer trip to the beach, and Takurō and Chizuru are each told that the other will be going. However, Takurō thinks going to the beach with Chizuru will make him uncomfortable, as he has given up trying to confess to her; and Chizuru is unhappy with the news that he may not be going after all. Kana sends Chiaki a text message asking to meet him after class, but Chiaki's phone battery has died and he is unable to see it. As Kana waits after school for his response, Chizuru and Noriko enter the classroom for music practice. Kana soon leaves the classroom, dismayed that Chiaki has apparently brushed her off; but she finds that Chiaki has stayed at school on his own to talk with her. He admits he had thought she would never break up with him and suggests they start their relationship fresh. He tells Kana that he seriously loves her and asks her to go out with him, and she tearfully accepts, thus mending their relationship and getting back together. Meanwhile, Takurō returns to the classroom to get his wallet; while Noriko leaves to use the bathroom, leaving Chizuru alone with Takurō. As Takurō starts to leave, Chizuru asks him if he is going to the beach. He answers that he is not, but that he hopes Chizuru has a lot of fun. However, Chizuru says she does not think she will have any fun without Takurō; and the two decide to go to the beach together as Noriko listens contentedly from the hallway.

== See also ==
- Happy Kanako's Killer Life, another manga series by Toshiya Wakabayashi
