= Teasing Master Takagi-san: The Movie =

2022 Japanese animated film by Hiroaki Akagi

- Theatrical release poster
- Kanji: 劇場版 からかい上手の高木さん
- Revised Hepburn: Gekijōban Karakai Jōzu no Takagi-san
- Directed by: Hiroaki Akagi
- Screenplay by: Hiroko Fukuda; Aki Itami; Kanichi Katō
- Based on: Teasing Master Takagi-san and Tomorrow Is Saturday by Sōichirō Yamamoto
- Produced by: Motomichi Araki; Yuito Hirahara; Yūhei Ueno; Reiko Sasaki; Yūkō Itō
- Starring: Rie Takahashi; Yuki Kaji; Konomi Kohara; M・A・O; Yui Ogura; Fukushi Ochiai; Nobuhiko Okamoto; Koki Uchiyama; Aoi Yūki; Yuma Uchida; Kotori Koiwai; Hinata Tadokoro; Inori Minase; Haruka Tomatsu
- Cinematography: Masato Makino
- Edited by: Yumiko Nakaba
- Music by: Hiroaki Tsutsumi
- Production company: Shin-Ei Animation
- Distributed by: Toho Visual Entertainment
- Release dates: June 4, 2022 (Chiyoda City); June 10, 2022 (Japan)
- Running time: 73 minutes
- Country: Japan
- Language: Japanese
- Box office: ¥400 million (US$3.04 million)

Teasing Master Takagi-san: The Movie (Japanese: 劇場版 からかい上手の高木さん, Hepburn: Gekijōban Karakai Jōzu no Takagi-san) is a 2022 Japanese animated romantic comedy film based on the manga series Teasing Master Takagi-san and its spin-off Tomorrow Is Saturday, both written and illustrated by Sōichirō Yamamoto, and a sequel to the 2018–2022 anime television series adaptation. Produced by Shin-Ei Animation and distributed by Toho Visual Entertainment, the film is directed by Hiroaki Akagi from an original story written by Hiroko Fukuda, with Aki Itami and Kanichi Katō co-writing it. In the film, Takagi and Nishikata spend the last summer of their third year in junior high school.

Initially teased in August 2021, the film was confirmed alongside the announcement of a third season for the Teasing Master Takagi-san anime series in September. The staff from the third season were announced to be helming the film in March 2022, with Rie Takahashi and Yuki Kaji returning to reprise their respective roles as Takagi and Nishikata. Additional staff and cast of the film were revealed in April 2022.

Teasing Master Takagi-san: The Movie held an early screening in Chiyoda, Tokyo on June 4, 2022, and was released in Japan on June 10. The film grossed ¥400 million at the box office and received a nomination at the Newtype Anime Awards.

== Plot ==
During a class, Nishikata worries about the rain because he left his umbrella at home. Takagi teases him by drawing the "umbrella" part of aiaigasa, but it turns out to be a fish bone. After school, the two play guriko. Takagi won the game after teasing Nishikata for kissing him as a punishment if he plays scissors. The following day, Nishikata and Nakai find Kimura taking Takao his pictures as part of recording their daily school life before graduation. Mr. Tanabe reminds Kimura and Takao to take pictures seriously since they will serve as their memento to look upon in the future. During a swimming class, Nishikata challenges Takagi on who can stay underwater the longest. She wins the challenge after uttering something that he has misunderstood. Later, Takagi learns from Mano the rumor about a wish being granted by seeing fireflies. After the swimming class, Hamaguchi asks Nishikata to substitute for him in helping with the island's mushi okuri so he can bond with Hojo before she goes to Canada for summer school. Nishikata invites Takagi to mushi okuri, but they are unable to find fireflies.

By the start of their summer vacation, Mina and Yukari learn that Sanae is aiming to enter high school in a city. Mina decides to list 100 things that the trio can do during the vacation. Meanwhile, Takagi and Nishikita find an abandoned kitten at a shrine. They bring it to a pet store owned by Ota along with her pet parrot Katsuo to buy it food. Afterward, Nishikata challenges Takagi on what name the kitten approves of, but they settle with the name "Hana" after finding it happily playing with flowers. Throughout their vacation, Takagi and Nishikata visit and take care of Hana at the shrine. Sometime later, Takagi reveals to Nishikata her decision to adopt the kitten. They purchase a flower-designed collar as a gift but upon returning to the shrine, they find a family bringing the kitten with them. Nishikata comforts Takagi and promises to make her happy forever. During a festival sometime later, Mina and Yukari are relieved to learn that Sanae plans to continue high school on the island with them. While watching the fireworks, Takagi also promises to make Nishikata happy forever. In a post-credits scene, an adult Takagi and Nishikata along with their daughter Chi participate in mushi okuri, during which they manage to find fireflies.

== Voice cast ==
| Character | Japanese | English |
|---|---|---|
| Takagi | Rie Takahashi | Sarah Wiedenheft |
| Nishikata | Yuki Kaji | Bryson Baugus |
| Mina | Konomi Kohara | Maggie Flecknoe |
| Yukari | M・A・O | Kristen McGuire |
| Sanae | Yui Ogura | Kristi Rothrock |
| Kimura | Fukushi Ochiai | Joe Daniels |
| Takao | Nobuhiko Okamoto | Blake Shepard |
| Hamaguchi | Koki Uchiyama | Scott Gibbs |
| Hojo | Aoi Yūki | Kira Vincent-Davis |
| Nakai | Yuma Uchida | James Marler |
| Mano | Kotori Koiwai | Jad Saxton |
| Takagawa | Madoka Asahina | Dominique Meyer |
| Mr. Tanabe | Hinata Tadokoro | Cris George |
| Hana (Note: Credited as "Flower" in the Blu-ray release by Sentai Filmworks.) | Inori Minase | Christina Kelly |
| Katsuo (Note: Credited as "Bonito" in the Blu-ray release by Sentai Filmworks.) | Jun Fukushima | Kyle Jones |
| Ota | Haruka Tomatsu | Donna Bella Litton |
| Chi | Yume Miyamoto | Elissa Cuellar |

== Production ==
In August 2021, the official website of Shogakukan initially teased a film version of Teasing Master Takagi-san manga series by Sōichirō Yamamoto upon posting details about the upcoming release of its sixteenth volume, which was discovered by a group of fans on Twitter who were supporting a possible third season of the anime series. The film was officially confirmed in September 2021. Sentai Filmworks announced the acquisition of the film's license in December 2021. Teasing Master Takagi-san anime series director Hiroaki Akagi was revealed to be returning to direct the film at Shin-Ei Animation, with supervision from Yamamoto, in March 2022 along with the main staff of the anime series' third season, including Hiroko Fukuda, Aki Itami, and Kanichi Katō as scriptwriters and Aya Takano as the character designer. Itami wrote the scenes with Hana owing to his love for cats, and Katō wrote the scenes involving Mina, Yukari, and Sanae. Fukuda was responsible for the main story and thus credited for the film's composition. Additionally, Rie Takahashi and Yuki Kaji were confirmed to be reprising their roles in the film as Takagi and Nishikata, respectively.

In April 2022, Inori Minase and Haruka Tomatsu were revealed to be joining the additional returning cast from the anime series in the film. The remaining staff for the film were also revealed, including Yuki Kasahara as the art director, Masato Makino as the cinematographer, Yumiko Nakaba as the editor, and Takahiro Enomito as the sound director. In May 2022, the characters that would be voiced by Minase and Tomatsu in the film were revealed as Hana, the kitten found by Takagi and Nishikata, and Ota, a pet store clerk, respectively. In June 2022, Akagi stated the film would depict "the end of the story that began in the third season", resulting in its storyline "not exist[ing] in the original work". As a result, the staff consulted with Yamamoto first before the production began. During the film's stage greeting at Toho Cinemas Hibiya that month, Yume Miyamoto was revealed as the voice of Takagi and Nishikata's daughter Chi, which was later confirmed by Miyamoto. Sentai Filmworks announced in July 2022 that the film would serve as a sequel to the anime series, and they revealed in November that it would receive an English dub with the release of its Blu-ray.

== Music ==
Hiroaki Tsutsumi was revealed to be composing Teasing Master Takagi-san: The Movie through film scoring in March 2022, after previously doing so for the anime series' three seasons. Yuiko Ōhara was also revealed to be performing the theme song for the film titled "The Beginning of Summer" (はじまりの夏, Hajimari no Natsu). It is from her album Island Memories, which was released in Japan by Toho Animation Records on July 13, 2022. Music arranger Minoru Yoshida included in the theme song the sound of waves and ferries he recorded at Shōdoshima. A collection of music used in the film, which was composed by Tsutsumi, was released digitally on June 10, 2022.

Teasing Master Takagi-san: The Movie – Music Collection track listing
| No. | Title | Length |
|---|---|---|
| 1. | "Sunny After Rain" | 3:31 |
| 2. | "Scissors Strategy" | 2:21 |
| 3. | "Teasing Savings" | 1:04 |
| 4. | "Unusual Takagi-san" | 1:13 |
| 5. | "Similar Days for Mina, Yukari, and Sanae" | 1:14 |
| 6. | "The Courage to Invite and the Joy of Being Invited" | 2:45 |
| 7. | "Mushi Okuri" | 6:26 |
| 8. | "Small Bus Stop" | 0:50 |
| 9. | "Reason to Meet" | 1:51 |
| 10. | "Meet Hana" | 1:07 |
| 11. | "The Beginning of Feelings" | 1:27 |
| 12. | "100 Things Mina, Yukari, and Sanae Want to Do" | 1:29 |
| 13. | "Name-deciding Match" | 1:30 |
| 14. | "Hana, Takagi-san, and Nishikata" | 1:39 |
| 15. | "A Game with Hana" | 1:29 |
| 16. | "I Don't Want This to End" | 1:30 |
| 17. | "Farewell to Hana" | 1:33 |
| 18. | "From Nishikata to Takagi-san" | 1:52 |
| 19. | "From Takagi-san to Nishikata" | 2:43 |
| 20. | "Teasing Master Takagi-san" | 3:16 |
| 21. | "As a Whole Family" | 2:05 |
| Total length: | | 42:55 |

=== Ending theme songs ===
In June 2022, it was revealed that the film's ending theme song would change weekly for four weeks, beginning with Rie Takahashi performing "The Door to Tomorrow" (明日への扉, Asu e no Tobira) by I Wish on the first week of its release. Ōhara was also revealed to be performing the film's insert song "Hamabo Flower" (ハマボウの花, Hamabō no Hana). The first ending theme song was released digitally on June 17, 2022. "Tentai Kansoku" by Bump of Chicken, performed by Takahashi, was revealed as the second ending theme song. It was released digitally on June 24, 2022. For the third ending theme song, Takahashi performed a cover version of "Fragile" by Every Little Thing. It was released digitally on July 1, 2022. The fourth ending theme song was revealed to be Takahashi's cover version of "Kimi ni Todoke" (君に届け) by Flumpool, which was first used as the theme song for the 2010 film Kimi ni Todoke. It was released digitally on July 8, 2022. The four theme songs are included in the album Teasing Master Takagi-san 3 & Movie Version Cover Song Collection, which was released in Japan on July 13, 2022.

== Marketing ==
Commercial videos for Teasing Master Takagi-san: The Movie were released in 2022, one in February and two in March. A teaser visual and trailer for the film were released in March 2022. The main visual for the film was released in April 2022. A new trailer for the film was released in May 2022. Teasing Master Takagi-san "Movie" Volume (からかい上手の高木さん "映画"巻), a 68-page booklet comprising the remade version of the first chapter of Teasing Master Takagi-san manga series ("Eraser" (消しゴム, Keshigomu)) and a new chapter based on a scene in the film titled "Starting Tomorrow" (明日から, Ashita Kara), was also announced as a gift during the film's first week of release in Japan. In July 2022, Sentai Filmworks released the film's official trailer in anticipation of its release in the United States.

== Release ==
=== Theatrical ===
Teasing Master Takagi-san: The Movie held its early screening in Toho Cinemas Hibiya in Chiyoda, Tokyo on June 4, 2022, and was released in Japan by Toho Visual Entertainment on June 10. The film was screened at the Sanuki Film Festival in Takamatsu, Kagawa on February 4–5, 2023.

The film held its United States premiere at Anime Expo in Regal Cinemas in Los Angeles on July 3, 2022, and was screened for two days starting August 14. It was screened at the Jamnime Festival 2023 in Thailand on February 3–5.

=== Home media ===
Teasing Master Takagi-san: The Movie was released on Blu-ray and DVD in Japan on November 16, 2022, and began streaming on Amazon Prime Video in the country on January 10, 2023. The film was released on Blu-ray by Sentai Filmworks in the United States and Canada on February 28, 2023, and began streaming on Hidive on June 18.

== Reception ==
=== Box office ===
Teasing Master Takagi-san: The Movie grossed ¥400 million (US$3.04 million) in Japan. In its opening weekend, it grossed ¥140 million (US$1.06 million), debuting sixth place at the box office behind Detective Conan: The Bride of Halloween (2022). In its second weekend, the film earned ¥47 million (US$354,591) and ranked down to ninth place at the box office. It dropped off the ranking in its third weekend after earning ¥31 million (US$235,950).

=== Critical response ===
The Japanese review and survey firm Filmarks placed Teasing Master Takagi-san: The Movie first in their first-day satisfaction ranking, with an average rating of 4.11/5, based on 322 reviews.

Allen Moody of THEM Anime Reviews found the subplot about a stray kitten unoriginal, comparing it to the similar subplot depicted in Kenichi: The Mightiest Disciple, but he gave the film a perfect 5 stars due to how "[its] virtues FAR outweigh its occasional lapses into overused tropes." Moody lauded the romance that "just keeps getting stronger", citing similarities with Aharen-san wa Hakarenai and Don't Toy with Me, Miss Nagatoro: 2nd Attack, how the main characters convey their feelings without saying "I love you", and the film's post-credits scene. In the program FilmWeek, KPCC film critic Charles Solomon described the film as "small... but a very gentle and sweet [film] you can't imagine anyone making in [the United States]." Kim Morrissy of Anime News Network graded the film "B+", feeling that it was a "natural culmination of what came before. If the end of the third season makes it easy to imagine what kind of future Nishikata and Takagi have together, then this film is like a coda." Morrissy praised the way the film's three-part plot "weave[s]... together in a way that makes them elegantly build on each other, culminating in a scene of romantic closure where no direct words of love even need to be said" and "builds up cinematic tension without introducing any external conflicts or relationship drama." However, Morrissy noted the short runtime.

=== Accolades ===
In October 2022, Teasing Master Takagi-san: The Movie was nominated for Best Picture (Film) Award at the Newtype Anime Awards. In December 2022, the film placed fourteenth among the top 20 Japanese animated films voted by fans to win the Anime of the Year at Tokyo Anime Award Festival 2023. In February 2023, the similar festival revealed that the film ranked 32nd in the top 50 for the Anime Fan Award, with 357 votes.
