= Yggdrasil (album) =

Studio album by Bump of Chicken
- Released: August 25, 2004
- Recorded: 2002–2004
- Genre: J-pop, rock
- Length: 66:29
- Label: Toy's Factory; TFCC-86171

Bump of Chicken chronology
Jupiter (2002)	Yggdrasil (2004)	Orbital Period (2007)

Yggdrasil (ユグドラシル, Yugudorashiru) is the fourth studio album by Bump of Chicken, released on August 25, 2004. It included the singles "Snow Smile", "Lost Man/Sailing Day", "Only Lonely Glory", and "Sharin no Uta". The album peaked at #1 on Oricon Weekly Charts and was #19 on the 2004 Oricon Top 100 Albums.

== Track listing ==
All tracks written by Fujiwara Motoo.

1. "asgard" – 0:39
2. "Only Lonely Glory" (オンリー ロンリー グローリー, Onrī Ronrī Gurōrī) (Album version) – 4:51
3. "Jyōshaken" (乗車権, Right to Ride) – 3:06
4. "Guild" (ギルド, Girudo) – 5:49
5. "embrace" – 5:31
6. "sailing day" – 4:05
7. "Onaji Door wo Kuguretara" (同じドアをくぐれたら, If Only We Could Go Through the Same Door) – 5:18
8. "Sharin no Uta" (車輪の唄, The Wheel Song) – 4:26
9. "Snow Smile" (スノースマイル, Sunō Sumairu) – 5:07
10. "Rem" (レム) – 4:22
11. "fire sign" – 5:13
12. "Taiyō" (太陽, Sun) – 5:49
13. "Lost Man" (ロストマン, Rosutoman) – 5:04
14. "midgard" – 0:41
15. "O-to-ga-me Heart" (Hidden track) – 6:31

== Personnel ==
- Fujiwara Motoo – Guitar, vocals
- Masukawa Hiroaki – Guitar
- Naoi Yoshifumi – Bass
- Masu Hideo – Drums
