= Lost Man/Sailing Day =

Single by Bump of Chicken

from the album Yggdrasil
- Released: March 12, 2003
- Recorded: 2003
- Genre: Rock
- Length: 9:09
- Label: Toy's Factory; TFCC-89063
- Songwriter: Fujiwara Motoo
- Producer: ???

Bump of Chicken singles chronology
"Snow Smile" (2002)	"Lost Man/Sailing Day" (2003)	"Sailing Day/Lost Man" (2003)

"Lost Man/Sailing Day" (ロストマン/sailing day, Rosutoman/seiringu dei) is the sixth single by Bump of Chicken. The title tracks are from the album Yggdrasil (ユグドラシル). "Lost Man" is the song that writing took time most from summer of 2002 to the end of the year. Also "Sailing Day" featured as the end theme to the animated movie One Piece The Movie: Dead End no Bōken.

== Track listing ==
All tracks written by Fujiwara Motoo.

1. "Lost Man" (ロストマン) — 5:04
2. "Sailing Day" — 4:05
3. "Omochi" (おもち) (Hidden track) — 2:59

== Personnel ==
- Fujiwara Motoo — Guitar, vocals
- Masukawa Hiroaki — Guitar
- Naoi Yoshifumi — Bass
- Masu Hideo — Drums

== Chart performance ==
Chart	Peak Position
Oricon Weekly Charts	2
2003 Oricon Top 100 Singles	29
