= Only Lonely Glory =

"Only Lonely Glory オンリー ロンリー グローリー"

Single by Bump of Chicken

from the album Yggdrasil
- B-side: "Suimin Jikan"
- Released: July 7, 2004
- Recorded: ???
- Genre: Rock
- Length: ??:??
- Label: Toy's Factory; TFCC-89109
- Songwriter: Fujiwara Motoo
- Producer: ???

Bump of Chicken singles chronology
"Arue" (2004)	"Only Lonely Glory オンリー ロンリー グローリー" (2004)	"Sharin no Uta" (2004)

"Only Lonely Glory" (オンリー ロンリー グローリー) is the eighth single by Bump of Chicken. The title track was on the album Yggdrasil (ユグドラシル). It is their first number one single on Oricon Weekly Charts.

== Track listing ==
All tracks written by Fujiwara Motoo.

1. "Only Lonely Glory" (オンリー ロンリー グローリー)
2. "Suimin Jikan" (睡眠時間)
3. "Joy: Shadow" (Joy: シャドー) (Hidden track)

== Personnel ==
- Fujiwara Motoo — Guitar, vocals
- Masukawa Hiroaki — Guitar
- Naoi Yoshifumi — Bass
- Masu Hideo — Drums

== Chart performance ==
Chart	Peak Position
Oricon Weekly Charts	1
2004 Oricon Top 100 Singles	50
