= Harujion =

"Harujion ハルジオン"

Single by Bump of Chicken

from the album Jupiter
- B-side: "Kanojo to Hoshi no Isu"
- Released: October 17, 2001
- Recorded: ???
- Genre: Rock
- Length: ??:??
- Label: Toy's Factory; TFCC-89001
- Songwriters: Fujiwara Motoo, Naoi Yoshifumi
- Producer: ???

Bump of Chicken singles chronology
"Tentai Kansoku" (2001)	"Harujion ハルジオン" (2001)	"Snow Smile" (2002)

"Harujion" (ハルジオン) is the fourth single by Bump of Chicken. The title track is from the album Jupiter.

== Track listing ==
1. "Harujion" (ハルジオン) (Fujiwara Motoo)
2. "Kanojo to Hoshi no Isu" (彼女と星の椅子) (Fujiwara, Naoi Yoshifumi)
3. "Love" (Hidden track)

== Personnel ==
- Fujiwara Motoo — Guitar, vocals
- Masukawa Hiroaki — Guitar
- Naoi Yoshifumi — Bass
- Masu Hideo — Drums

== Chart performance ==
Chart	Peak Position
Oricon Weekly Charts	5
2001 Oricon Top 100 Singles	?
