= Orbital Period (album) =

Studio album by Bump of Chicken
- Released: December 19, 2007
- Recorded: 2005–2007
- Genre: J-pop; alternative rock
- Length: 70:59 (without hidden track)
- Label: Toy's Factory; TFCC-86245

Bump of Chicken chronology
Yggdrasil (2004)	Orbital Period (2007)	Present from You (2008)

Professional ratings
Review scores
Source	Rating
AllMusic	4/5 stars

Orbital Period is the fifth studio album by Bump of Chicken, released on December 19, 2007. The album features the singles "Planetarium", "Supernova/Karma", "Namida no Furusato", "Hana no Na", and "Mayday". Orbital period became the best-selling album two days in a row at debut, according to Oricon Style. It was the second best-selling album on its debut week.

== Track listing ==
Orbital Period
No.	Title	Length
1.	"Voyager"	1:18
2.	"Hoshi no Tori" (星の鳥, Star Bird)	0:55
3.	"Mayday" (メーデー, album version)	5:34
4.	"Sainoujin Ouenka" (才悩人応援歌; Fans' song for those worried about talent)	4:18
5.	"Planetarium" (プラネタリウム)	5:32
6.	"Supernova"	6:09
7.	"Hammer Song to Itami no Tou" (ハンマーソングと痛みの塔, Hammer Song and the Tower of Pain)	4:20
8.	"Jikuu Kakurenbo" (時空かくれんぼ, Spacetime Hide-and-Seek)	5:11
9.	"Kasabutabutabu" (かさぶたぶたぶ, Scabcabcab)	3:58
10.	"Hana no Na" (花の名, Name of the Flower)	6:02
11.	"Hitorigoto" (ひとりごと, Soliloquy)	4:16
12.	"Amedama no Uta" (飴玉の唄, The Candy Song)	5:57
13.	"Hoshi no Tori reprise" (星の鳥 reprise, Star Bird Reprise)	0:39
14.	"Karma" (カルマ)	3:29
15.	"Arrows"	6:21
16.	"Namida no Furusato" (涙のふるさと, Homeland of Tears)	5:03
17.	"Flyby"	1:55
18.	"Believe" (Hidden track)	4:51
Total length:		1:15:50

== Personnel ==
- Fujiwara Motoo — vocals, guitar
- Masukawa Hiroaki — guitar
- Naoi Yoshifumi — bass
- Masu Hideo — drums
