= Mayday (Bump of Chicken song) =

"Mayday メーデー"

Single by Bump of Chicken

from the album Orbital Period
- B-side: "Glass no Blues (28 years round)"
- Released: October 24, 2007
- Recorded: ???
- Genre: Rock
- Length: ??:??
- Label: Toy's Factory; TFCC-89228
- Songwriter: Fujiwara Motoo
- Producer: ???

Bump of Chicken singles chronology
"Hana no Na" (2007)	"Mayday メーデー" (2007)	"R.I.P./Merry Christmas" (2009)

"Mayday" (メーデー) is the fourteenth single by Bump of Chicken, released on October 24, 2007. The title track is from the album Orbital Period. The single peaked at #2 on the Oricon Weekly Charts, behind "Hana no Na" (花の名), which was released on the same day. The B-side is a remix of "Glass no Blues" from the album Flame Vein.

== In other media ==
In September 2024, "Mayday" was used as the soundtrack for an animated short produced by Studio Trigger in honor of the 40th anniversary of the Transformers franchise.

== Track listing ==
1. "Mayday" (メーデー) (Fujiwara Motoo)
2. "Glass no Blues (28 Years Round)" (ガラスのブルース （28 Years Round）) (Fujiwara)
3. "Stardust Dance Hall" (スターダストダンスホール) (Hidden track)

== Personnel ==
- Fujiwara Motoo — Guitar, vocals
- Masukawa Hiroaki — Guitar
- Naoi Yoshifumi — Bass
- Masu Hideo — Drums

== Chart performance ==
Chart	Peak Position
Oricon Weekly Charts	2
2007 Oricon Top 100 Singles	25
