= Planetarium (Bump of Chicken song) =

Single by Bump of Chicken

from the album Orbital Period
- B-side: "Ginga Tetsudou"
- Released: July 21, 2005
- Recorded: ???
- Genre: Rock
- Length: ??:??
- Label: Toy's Factory; TFCC-89142
- Songwriter: Fujiwara Motoo
- Producer: ???

Bump of Chicken singles chronology
"Sharin no Uta" (2004)	"Planetarium" (2005)	"Supernova/Karma" (2005)

"Planetarium" (プラネタリウム, Puranetariumu) is the tenth single by Bump of Chicken, released on July 21, 2005. The title track is from the album Orbital Period.

== Track listing ==
All tracks written by Fujiwara Motoo.

1. "Planetarium" (プラネタリウム)
2. "Ginga Tetsudou" (銀河鉄道)
3. "Ika" (いか) (Hidden track)

== Personnel ==
- Fujiwara Motoo — Guitar, vocals
- Masukawa Hiroaki — Guitar
- Naoi Yoshifumi — Bass
- Masu Hideo — Drums

== Chart performance ==
Chart	Peak Position
Oricon Weekly Charts	4
2005 Oricon Top 100 Singles	35
