= List of Teasing Master Takagi-san episodes =

The logo of the series.

Teasing Master Takagi-san is an anime series adapted from the manga of the same title by Sōichirō Yamamoto. The series received a total of three television seasons and an animated film released in Japan on June 10, 2022.

== Series overview ==
Season	Episodes	Originally released	
Season	Episodes	First released	Last released
1	12 + 1 OVA	January 18, 2018	July 12, 2018
2	12	July 7, 2019	September 22, 2019
3	12	January 8, 2022	March 26, 2022

== Episodes ==
=== Season 1 (2018) ===
Story	Episode	Title (Note: All English titles are taken from Crunchyroll.)	Directed by	Written by	Storyboarded by	Original release date
1	1	"Eraser"; Transcription: "Keshigomu" (Japanese: 消しゴム)	Hiroyuki Ōshima	Michiko Yokote	Hiroaki Akagi	January 8, 2018
1	1	"Day Duty"; Transcription: "Nitchoku" (Japanese: 日直)	Hiroyuki Ōshima	Michiko Yokote	Hiroyuki Ōshima	January 8, 2018
1	1	"Funny Face"; Transcription: "Hengao" (Japanese: 変顔)	Hiroyuki Ōshima	Michiko Yokote	Hiroyuki Ōshima	January 8, 2018
1	1	"One Hundred Yen"; Transcription: "Hyaku-en" (Japanese: 百円)	Hiroyuki Ōshima	Michiko Yokote	Hiroyuki Ōshima	January 8, 2018
2	2	"Calligraphy"; Transcription: "Shūji" (Japanese: 習字)	Daiji Suzuki	Michiko Yokote	Daiji Suzuki	January 15, 2018
2	2	"Seasonal Change of Clothing"; Transcription: "Koromogae" (Japanese: 衣替え)	Daiji Suzuki	Michiko Yokote	Daiji Suzuki	January 15, 2018
2	2	"English Translation"; Transcription: "Eiyaku" (Japanese: 英訳)	Daiji Suzuki	Michiko Yokote	Daiji Suzuki	January 15, 2018
2	2	"Pool"; Transcription: "Pūru" (Japanese: プール)	Daiji Suzuki	Michiko Yokote	Daiji Suzuki	January 15, 2018
3	3	"Coffee"; Transcription: "Kōhī" (Japanese: コーヒー)	Bak Gyeong-sun	Tōko Machida	Bak Gyeong-sun	January 22, 2018
3	3	"Empty Can"; Transcription: "Akikan" (Japanese: 空き缶)	Bak Gyeong-sun	Tōko Machida	Bak Gyeong-sun	January 22, 2018
3	3	"Soda"; Transcription: "Tansan" (Japanese: 炭酸)	Bak Gyeong-sun	Tōko Machida	Bak Gyeong-sun	January 22, 2018
3	3	"Muscle Training"; Transcription: "Kintore" (Japanese: 筋トレ)	Bak Gyeong-sun	Tōko Machida	Bak Gyeong-sun	January 22, 2018
3	3	"Dubbing"; Transcription: "Afureko" (Japanese: アフレコ)	Bak Gyeong-sun	Tōko Machida	Bak Gyeong-sun	January 22, 2018
3	3	"Umbrella"; Transcription: "Kasa" (Japanese: 傘)	Bak Gyeong-sun	Tōko Machida	Bak Gyeong-sun	January 22, 2018
4	4	"Cleaning Duty"; Transcription: "Sōji Tōban" (Japanese: 掃除当番)	Kyōhei Suzuki	Fumi Tsubota	Kyōhei Suzuki	January 29, 2018
4	4	"Kickover"; Transcription: "Sakaagari" (Japanese: 逆上がり)	Masato Satō	Fumi Tsubota	Daiji Suzuki	January 29, 2018
4	4	"Cold"; Transcription: "Kaze" (Japanese: 風邪)	Kyōhei Suzuki	Fumi Tsubota	Kyōhei Suzuki	January 29, 2018
4	4	"Tailing"; Transcription: "Bikō" (Japanese: 尾行)	Masato Satō	Fumi Tsubota	Daiji Suzuki	January 29, 2018
5	5	"Studying for the Test"; Transcription: "Tesuto Benkyō" (Japanese: テスト勉強)	Yasuaki Fujii	Michiko Yokote	Yoshie Yoshi	February 5, 2018
5	5	"Test"; Transcription: "Tesuto" (Japanese: テスト)	Yasuaki Fujii	Michiko Yokote	Yoshie Yoshi	February 5, 2018
5	5	"Test Results"; Transcription: "Tesuto Henkyaku" (Japanese: テスト返却)	Yasuaki Fujii	Michiko Yokote	Yoshie Yoshi	February 5, 2018
5	5	"Bookstore"; Transcription: "Hon'ya" (Japanese: 本屋)	Yasuaki Fujii	Michiko Yokote	Yoshie Yoshi	February 5, 2018
5	5	"Shelter from the Rain"; Transcription: "Amayadori" (Japanese: 雨宿り)	Yasuaki Fujii	Michiko Yokote	Yoshie Yoshi	February 5, 2018
6	6	"Tandem Riding"; Transcription: "Futarinori" (Japanese: 二人乗り)	Shin'ya Une	Tōko Machida	Shin'ya Une	February 12, 2018
6	6	"First Day of Summer Vacation"; Transcription: "Natsuyasumi Shonichi" (Japanese: 夏休み初日)	Shin'ya Une	Tōko Machida	Shin'ya Une	February 12, 2018
6	6	"Test of Courage"; Transcription: "Kimodameshi" (Japanese: 肝試し)	Shin'ya Une	Tōko Machida	Shin'ya Une	February 12, 2018
6	6	"Summer Science Project"; Transcription: "Jiyū Kenkyū" (Japanese: 自由研究)	Shin'ya Une	Tōko Machida	Shin'ya Une	February 12, 2018
6	6	"Water Tap"; Transcription: "Suidō" (Japanese: 水道)	Shin'ya Une	Tōko Machida	Shin'ya Une	February 12, 2018
7	7	"Shopping"; Transcription: "Kaimono" (Japanese: 買い物)	Hiroyuki Ōshima; Takeshi Ushigusa	Fumi Tsubota	Hiroyuki Ōshima; Takeshi Ushigusa	February 19, 2018
7	7	"Swimsuit"; Transcription: "Mizugi" (Japanese: 水着)	Hiroyuki Ōshima	Fumi Tsubota	Hiroyuki Ōshima	February 19, 2018
7	7	"Ocean"; Transcription: "Umi" (Japanese: 海)	Hiroyuki Ōshima	Fumi Tsubota	Hiroyuki Ōshima	February 19, 2018
7	7	"Room"; Transcription: "Heya" (Japanese: 部屋)	Hiroyuki Ōshima	Fumi Tsubota	Hiroyuki Ōshima	February 19, 2018
8	8	"Typhoon"; Transcription: "Taifū" (Japanese: 台風)	Hirofumi Ogura	Michiko Yokote	Bak Gyeong-sun	February 26, 2018
8	8	"Marathon"; Transcription: "Marason" (Japanese: マラソン)	Hirofumi Ogura	Michiko Yokote	Bak Gyeong-sun	February 26, 2018
8	8	"Ribs"; Transcription: "Wakibara" (Japanese: わき腹)	Hirofumi Ogura	Michiko Yokote	Bak Gyeong-sun	February 26, 2018
8	8	"Regret"; Transcription: "Miren" (Japanese: 未練)	Hirofumi Ogura	Michiko Yokote	Bak Gyeong-sun	February 26, 2018
9	9	"Cell Phone"; Transcription: "Kētai" (Japanese: ケータイ)	Naoki Murata	Michiko Yokote	Osamu Matsumoto	March 5, 2018
9	9	"Horror"; Transcription: "Horā" (Japanese: ホラー)	Naoki Murata	Michiko Yokote	Osamu Matsumoto	March 5, 2018
9	9	"Picture"; Transcription: "Shashin" (Japanese: 写真)	Naoki Murata	Michiko Yokote	Osamu Matsumoto	March 5, 2018
10	10	"Who's Taller?"; Transcription: "Seikurabe" (Japanese: 背比べ)	Shin'ya Une	Fumi Tsubota	Daiji Suzuki	March 12, 2018
10	10	"I Hate the Cold"; Transcription: "Samugari" (Japanese: 寒がり)	Shin'ya Une	Fumi Tsubota	Yoshie Yoshi	March 12, 2018
10	10	"Invitation"; Transcription: "Osasoi" (Japanese: お誘い)	Shin'ya Une	Fumi Tsubota	Shin'ya Une	March 12, 2018
10	10	"Two-Choice Question"; Transcription: "Nitaku Kuizu" (Japanese: 二択クイズ)	Shin'ya Une	Fumi Tsubota	Daiji Suzuki	March 12, 2018
11	11	"Cat"; Transcription: "Neko" (Japanese: ネコ)	Masato Satō	Tōko Machida	Hirofumi Ogura	March 19, 2018
11	11	"Taste"; Transcription: "Konomi" (Japanese: 好み)	Masato Satō	Tōko Machida	Hirofumi Ogura	March 19, 2018
11	11	"Portrait"; Transcription: "Nigaoe" (Japanese: 似顔絵)	Masato Satō	Tōko Machida	Hirofumi Ogura	March 19, 2018
11	11	"Fortune Telling"; Transcription: "Uranai" (Japanese: 占い)	Masato Satō	Tōko Machida	Hirofumi Ogura	March 19, 2018
11	11	"Critical Hit"; Transcription: "Kuritikaru" (Japanese: クリティカル)	Masato Satō	Tōko Machida	Hirofumi Ogura	March 19, 2018
12	12	"Letter"; Transcription: "Tegami" (Japanese: 手紙)	Shigeru Fukase	Michiko Yokote	Shigeru Fukase	March 26, 2018
12	12	"First Day of School"; Transcription: "Nyūgakushiki" (Japanese: 入学式)	Shigeru Fukase	Michiko Yokote	Yoshie Yoshi	March 26, 2018
12	12	"Seating Arrangement"; Transcription: "Sekigae" (Japanese: 席替え)	Shigeru Fukase	Michiko Yokote	Takeshi Ushigusa	March 26, 2018
13 (OVA)	13 (OVA)	"Water Slide"; Transcription: "Wōtā Suraidā" (Japanese: ウォータースライダー)	Yumeko Iwaoka	Michiko Yokote	Hiroaki Akagi; Yumeko Iwaoka	July 12, 2018

=== Season 2 (2019) ===
Story	Episode	Title (Note: All English titles are taken from Netflix.)	Directed by	Written by	Storyboarded by	Original release date	Worldwide release date
14	1	"Textbook"; Transcription: "Kyōkasho" (Japanese: 教科書)	Yumeko Iwaoka	Kan'ichi Katō	Hiroaki Akagi	July 7, 2019	December 6, 2019
14	1	"Hypnosis"; Transcription: "Saiminjutsu" (Japanese: 催眠術)	Yumeko Iwaoka	Kan'ichi Katō	Hiroaki Akagi	July 7, 2019	December 6, 2019
14	1	"Waking Up"; Transcription: "Neoki" (Japanese: 寝起き)	Yumeko Iwaoka	Kan'ichi Katō	Hiroaki Akagi	July 7, 2019	December 6, 2019
14	1	"Stone Skipping"; Transcription: "Mizukiri" (Japanese: 水切り)	Yumeko Iwaoka	Kan'ichi Katō	Hiroaki Akagi	July 7, 2019	December 6, 2019
15	2	"Ice"; Transcription: "Kōri" (Japanese: 氷)	Shigeru Fukase	Aki Itami	Shigeru Fukase	July 14, 2019	December 6, 2019
15	2	"Appearance"; Transcription: "Gaiken" (Japanese: 外見)	Shigeru Fukase	Aki Itami	Shigeru Fukase	July 14, 2019	December 6, 2019
15	2	"Bangs"; Transcription: "Maegami" (Japanese: 前髪)	Shigeru Fukase	Aki Itami	Shigeru Fukase	July 14, 2019	December 6, 2019
15	2	"Valentine's Day"; Transcription: "Barentain Dē" (Japanese: バレンタインデー)	Shigeru Fukase	Aki Itami	Shigeru Fukase	July 14, 2019	December 6, 2019
16	3	"April Fools' Day"; Transcription: "Eipuriru Fūru" (Japanese: エイプリルフール)	Juria Matsumura	Kan'ichi Katō	Juria Matsumura	July 21, 2019	December 6, 2019
16	3	"Blossom Watching"; Transcription: "Ohanami" (Japanese: お花見)	Juria Matsumura	Kan'ichi Katō	Juria Matsumura	July 21, 2019	December 6, 2019
16	3	"Forms of Address"; Transcription: "Yobikata" (Japanese: 呼び方)	Juria Matsumura	Kan'ichi Katō	Yumeko Iwaoka	July 21, 2019	December 6, 2019
16	3	"New School Year"; Transcription: "Shinkyū" (Japanese: 進級)	Juria Matsumura	Kan'ichi Katō	Yumeko Iwaoka	July 21, 2019	December 6, 2019
17	4	"Arm Wrestling"; Transcription: "Udezumō" (Japanese: 腕ずもう)	Kazuhiro Ōmame	Hiroko Fukuda	Yoshie Yoshi	July 28, 2019	December 6, 2019
17	4	"Grown-Up"; Transcription: "Otonappoku" (Japanese: 大人っぽく)	Kazuhiro Ōmame	Hiroko Fukuda	Yoshie Yoshi	July 28, 2019	December 6, 2019
17	4	"Bitter Taste"; Transcription: "Nigami" (Japanese: にがみ)	Kazuhiro Ōmame	Hiroko Fukuda	Yoshie Yoshi	July 28, 2019	December 6, 2019
17	4	"Bicycle"; Transcription: "Jitensha" (Japanese: 自転車)	Kazuhiro Ōmame	Hiroko Fukuda	Yoshie Yoshi	July 28, 2019	December 6, 2019
18	5	"Questions"; Transcription: "Shitsumon" (Japanese: 質問)	Shin'ya Une	Aki Itami	Shin'ya Une	August 4, 2019	December 6, 2019
18	5	"Eyebrows"; Transcription: "Mayuge" (Japanese: まゆ毛)	Shin'ya Une	Aki Itami	Shin'ya Une	August 4, 2019	December 6, 2019
18	5	"After School"; Transcription: "Hōkago" (Japanese: 放課後)	Shin'ya Une	Aki Itami	Shin'ya Une	August 4, 2019	December 6, 2019
18	5	"Happy Birthday"; Transcription: "Happī Bāsudē" (Japanese: ハッピーバースデー)	Shin'ya Une	Aki Itami	Shin'ya Une	August 4, 2019	December 6, 2019
18	5	"Sneeze"; Transcription: "Kushami" (Japanese: くしゃみ)	Shin'ya Une	Aki Itami	Shin'ya Une	August 4, 2019	December 6, 2019
19	6	"Revenge"; Transcription: "Ribenji" (Japanese: リベンジ)	Shigeru Fukase	Aki Itami	Sekijū Sekino	August 11, 2019	December 6, 2019
19	6	"Dodgeball"; Transcription: "Dojjibōru" (Japanese: ドッジボール)	Shigeru Fukase	Aki Itami	Sekijū Sekino	August 11, 2019	December 6, 2019
19	6	"Buy and Eat"; Transcription: "Kaigui" (Japanese: 買い食い)	Shigeru Fukase	Aki Itami	Shigeru Fukase	August 11, 2019	December 6, 2019
19	6	"Date"; Transcription: "Dēto" (Japanese: デート)	Shigeru Fukase	Aki Itami	Hiroaki Yoshikawa	August 11, 2019	December 6, 2019
20	7	"Camping Field Trip"; Transcription: "Rinkan Gakkō" (Japanese: 林間学校)	Yumeko Iwaoka	Kan'ichi Katō	Hiroaki Akagi	August 18, 2019	December 6, 2019
21	8	"Storage Closet"; Transcription: "Taiiku Sōko" (Japanese: 体育倉庫)	Naoki Murata	Hiroko Fukuda	Bak Gyeong-sun	August 25, 2019	December 6, 2019
21	8	"Nurse's Office"; Transcription: "Hokenshitsu" (Japanese: 保健室)	Naoki Murata	Hiroko Fukuda	Yumeko Iwaoka	August 25, 2019	December 6, 2019
21	8	"Lottery"; Transcription: "Takarakuji" (Japanese: 宝くじ)	Naoki Murata	Hiroko Fukuda	Bak Gyeong-sun	August 25, 2019	December 6, 2019
22	9	"Made You Look"; Transcription: "Atchi Muite Hoi" (Japanese: あっちむいてほい)	Bak Gyeong-sun	Hiroko Fukuda	Juria Matsumura	September 1, 2019	December 6, 2019
22	9	"Talents"; Transcription: "Tokugi" (Japanese: 特技)	Bak Gyeong-sun	Hiroko Fukuda	Juria Matsumura	September 1, 2019	December 6, 2019
22	9	"Worries"; Transcription: "Onayami" (Japanese: お悩み)	Bak Gyeong-sun	Hiroko Fukuda	Juria Matsumura	September 1, 2019	December 6, 2019
22	9	"Messages"; Transcription: "Mēru" (Japanese: メール)	Bak Gyeong-sun	Hiroko Fukuda	Juria Matsumura	September 1, 2019	December 6, 2019
23	10	"Eye Drops"; Transcription: "Megusuri" (Japanese: 目薬)	Kakushi Ifuku	Hiroko Fukuda	Hiroaki Yoshikawa	September 8, 2019	December 6, 2019
23	10	"Scoop"; Transcription: "Sukūpu" (Japanese: スクープ)	Kakushi Ifuku	Hiroko Fukuda	Hiroaki Yoshikawa	September 8, 2019	December 6, 2019
23	10	"Hide-and-Seek"; Transcription: "Kakurenbo" (Japanese: かくれんぼ)	Kakushi Ifuku	Hiroko Fukuda	Hiroaki Yoshikawa	September 8, 2019	December 6, 2019
23	10	"Treasure Hunting"; Transcription: "Takara Sagashi" (Japanese: 宝探し)	Kakushi Ifuku	Hiroko Fukuda	Hiroaki Yoshikawa	September 8, 2019	December 6, 2019
24	11	"Steps"; Transcription: "Hosū" (Japanese: 歩数)	Juria Matsumura	Kan'ichi Katō	Yumeko Iwaoka	September 15, 2019	December 6, 2019
24	11	"Fireworks"; Transcription: "Hanabi" (Japanese: 花火)	Juria Matsumura	Kan'ichi Katō	Hiroaki Sakurai	September 15, 2019	December 6, 2019
24	11	"Souvenirs"; Transcription: "Omiyage" (Japanese: お土産)	Juria Matsumura	Kan'ichi Katō	Shin'ichi Omata	September 15, 2019	December 6, 2019
24	11	"Promises"; Transcription: "Yakusoku" (Japanese: 約束)	Juria Matsumura	Kan'ichi Katō	Akitarō Daichi	September 15, 2019	December 6, 2019
25	12	"Summer Festival"; Transcription: "Natsumatsuri" (Japanese: 夏祭り)	Shin'ya Une	Aki Itami	Shin'ya Une	September 22, 2019	December 6, 2019

=== Season 3 (2022) ===
Story	Episode	Title (Note: All English titles are taken from Hidive.)	Directed by	Written by	Storyboarded by	Original release date (Note: MBS listed the season premiere at 25:25 on January 7, 2022, which is effectively January 8 at 1:25 a.m. JST.)
26	1	"The Grip Strength Thingy"; Transcription: "Akuryoku no Yatsu" (Japanese: 握力のやつ)	Yasuaki Fujii	Hiroko Fukuda	Yasuaki Fujii	January 8, 2022 (Note: This episode aired at 1:55 a.m. JST, 30 minutes after the original air time.)
26	1	"Tan"; Transcription: "Hiyake" (Japanese: 日焼け)	Yasuaki Fujii	Hiroko Fukuda	Yasuaki Fujii	January 8, 2022
26	1	"New Semester"; Transcription: "Shin Gakki" (Japanese: 新学期)	Yasuaki Fujii	Hiroko Fukuda	Yasuaki Fujii	January 8, 2022
27	2	"Presence"; Transcription: "Kehai" (Japanese: 気配)	Shin'ya Une	Aki Itami	Shin'ya Une	January 15, 2022
27	2	"Presence, Continued"; Transcription: "Zoku Kehai" (Japanese: 続・気配)	Shin'ya Une	Aki Itami	Shin'ya Une	January 15, 2022
27	2	"Desk Check"; Transcription: "Mochimono Kensa" (Japanese: 持ち物検査)	Shin'ya Une	Aki Itami	Shin'ya Une	January 15, 2022
27	2	"Library Duty"; Transcription: "Tosho Iin" (Japanese: 図書委員)	Shin'ya Une	Aki Itami	Shin'ya Une	January 15, 2022
27	2	"Sunset"; Transcription: "Yūhi" (Japanese: 夕日)	Shin'ya Une	Aki Itami	Shin'ya Une	January 15, 2022
28	3	"Fan"; Transcription: "Uchiwa" (Japanese: うちわ)	Bak Gyeong-sun	Kan'ichi Katō	Bak Gyeong-sun	January 22, 2022 (Note: This episode aired at 1:40 a.m. JST, 15 minutes after the original air time.)
28	3	"Bewilder Ball"; Transcription: "Makyū" (Japanese: 魔球)	Bak Gyeong-sun	Kan'ichi Katō	Bak Gyeong-sun	January 22, 2022
28	3	"Cat Rescue"; Transcription: "Neko Kyūshutsu" (Japanese: ネコ救出)	Bak Gyeong-sun	Kan'ichi Katō	Hiroaki Sakurai	January 22, 2022
28	3	"Rain"; Transcription: "Ame" (Japanese: 雨)	Bak Gyeong-sun	Kan'ichi Katō	Bak Gyeong-sun	January 22, 2022
29	4	"Uniform Change"; Transcription: "Koromogae" (Japanese: 衣替え)	Naoki Murata	Aki Itami	Hiroki Imamura	January 29, 2022
29	4	"Winter Uniform"; Transcription: "Fuyufuku" (Japanese: 冬服)	Naoki Murata	Aki Itami	Hiroki Imamura	January 29, 2022
29	4	"Lunch"; Transcription: "Obentō" (Japanese: お弁当)	Naoki Murata	Aki Itami	Hiroki Imamura	January 29, 2022
29	4	"UFO"	Naoki Murata	Aki Itami	Juria Matsumura	January 29, 2022
29	4	"Night"; Transcription: "Yoru" (Japanese: 夜)	Naoki Murata	Aki Itami	Juria Matsumura	January 29, 2022
30	5	"Dislikes"; Transcription: "Nigate na Mono" (Japanese: 苦手なもの)	Hiroki Imamura	Kan'ichi Katō	Hiroki Imamura	February 5, 2022 (Note: This episode aired at 1:35 a.m. JST, 10 minutes after the original air time.)
30	5	"Gyoza"; Transcription: "Gyōza" (Japanese: ギョーザ)	Dali Chen	Kan'ichi Katō	Hiroki Imamura	February 5, 2022
30	5	"Audition"; Transcription: "Yaku Gime" (Japanese: 役決め)	Hiroki Imamura	Kan'ichi Katō	Yōko Kuno	February 5, 2022
30	5	"Fishing"; Transcription: "Tsuri" (Japanese: 釣り)	Dali Chen	Kan'ichi Katō	Hideki Okamoto	February 5, 2022
31	6	"Culture Fest"; Transcription: "Bunkasai" (Japanese: 文化祭)	Yasuaki Fujii; Bak Gyeong-sun	Hiroko Fukuda	Yasuaki Fujii	February 12, 2022
32	7	"On a Walk"; Transcription: "Sanpo" (Japanese: 散歩)	Bak Gyeong-sun	Aki Itami	Bak Gyeong-sun	February 19, 2022
32	7	"Left at School"; Transcription: "Wasuremono" (Japanese: 忘れもの)	Bak Gyeong-sun	Aki Itami	Bak Gyeong-sun	February 19, 2022
32	7	"Santa Claus?"; Transcription: "Santa-san?" (Japanese: サンタさん？)	Bak Gyeong-sun	Aki Itami	Bak Gyeong-sun	February 19, 2022
32	7	"Knitting"; Transcription: "Amimono" (Japanese: 編み物)	Bak Gyeong-sun	Aki Itami	Bak Gyeong-sun	February 19, 2022
33	8	"Side Trip Part 1"; Transcription: "Yorimichi Ichi" (Japanese: 寄り道①)	Naoki Murata	Aki Itami	Shōji Nishida	February 26, 2022
33	8	"Side Trip Part 2"; Transcription: "Yorimichi Ni" (Japanese: 寄り道②)	Naoki Murata	Aki Itami	Shōji Nishida	February 26, 2022
33	8	"Side Trip Part 3"; Transcription: "Yorimichi San" (Japanese: 寄り道③)	Naoki Murata	Aki Itami	Shōji Nishida	February 26, 2022
33	8	"Side Trip Part 4"; Transcription: "Yorimichi Yon" (Japanese: 寄り道④)	Naoki Murata	Aki Itami	Shōji Nishida	February 26, 2022
33	8	"Renting DVDs"; Transcription: "Rentaru Dī Bui Dī" (Japanese: レンタルDVD)	Naoki Murata	Aki Itami	Shōji Nishida	February 26, 2022
34	9	"Christmas"; Transcription: "Kurisumasu" (Japanese: クリスマス)	Hiroki Imamura	Aki Itami	Juria Matsumura; Hiroki Imamura	March 5, 2022
35	10	"First Shrine Visit"; Transcription: "Hatsumōde" (Japanese: 初詣で)	Marie Watanabe	Kan'ichi Katō	Yūya Fukuda	March 12, 2022
35	10	"Snowman"; Transcription: "Yukidaruma" (Japanese: 雪だるま)	Marie Watanabe	Kan'ichi Katō	Yūya Fukuda	March 12, 2022
35	10	"New Years"; Transcription: "Oshōgatsu" (Japanese: お正月)	Marie Watanabe	Kan'ichi Katō	Yūya Fukuda	March 12, 2022
35	10	"Advice"; Transcription: "Sōdan" (Japanese: 相談)	Marie Watanabe	Kan'ichi Katō	Akitarō Daichi	March 12, 2022
36	11	"February 14th" Transcription: "Nigatsu Jūyokka" (Japanese: 2月14日)	Dali Chen	Hiroko Fukuda	Shin'ya Une	March 19, 2022
37	12	"March 14th" Transcription: "Sangatsu Jūyokka" (Japanese: 3月14日)	Yūki Bessho	Hiroko Fukuda	Hiroaki Yoshikawa	March 26, 2022
