= Jupiter (Bump of Chicken album) =

Studio album by Bump of Chicken
- Released: February 20, 2002
- Recorded: 2000–2002
- Genre: Rock, folk rock
- Length: 69:17
- Language: Japanese
- Label: Toy's Factory

Bump of Chicken chronology
The Living Dead (2000)	Jupiter (2002)	Yggdrasil (2004)

Singles from Jupiter
- 1. "Diamond" Released: September 20, 2000; 2. "Tentai Kansoku" Released: March 14, 2001; 3. "Harujion" Released: October 17, 2001

Jupiter (ジュピター, Jupitā) is Japanese rock band Bump of Chicken's third and major debut studio album, released on February 20, 2002. It peaked at #1 on the Oricon Weekly Charts. Jupiter was #45 on the 2002 Oricon Top 100 Albums.

== Track listing ==
All tracks are written by Motoo Fujiwara, except where noted

No.	Title	Length
1.	"Stage of the Ground"	5:33
2.	"Tentai Kansoku" (天体観測 "Amateur Astronomy")	4:23
3.	"Title of Mine"	5:02
4.	"Catch Ball" (キャッチボール "Kyacchi Bōru" (composed by Hiroaki Masukawa))	6:03
5.	"Harujion" (ハルジオン "Erigeron philadelphicus")	4:36
6.	"Bench and Coffee" (ベンチとコーヒー "Benchi to Kōhī")	6:12
7.	"Melody Flag" (メロディーフラッグ Merodī Furaggu)	5:48
8.	"Bell" (ベル Beru)	4:33
9.	"Diamond" (ダイヤモンド Daiyamondo)	4:33
10.	"Dandelion" (ダンデライオン Danderaion)	2:58
11.	"In my Heart/In my Nikke" (hidden track (includes 15:02 of silence))	21:54
Total length:		69:17
