= Inori Minase =

Japanese voice actress

- 水瀬 いのり
- Born: December 2, 1995 (age 30); Tokyo, Japan
- Occupations: Voice actress; singer
- Years active: 2010–present
- Agents: Sony Music Artists (2010–2017); Axl One (2017–present)
- Notable work: The Anthem of the Heart as Jun Naruse; AoButa as Shoko Makinohara; Assault Lily Bouquet as Moyu Mashima; The Case Study of Vanitas as Jeanne; DanMachi as Hestia; Dead Mount Death Play as Misaki Sakimiya; The Eminence in Shadow as Beta/Natsume Kafka; FLCL Progressive as Hidomi Hibajiri; GochiUsa as Chino Kafū; How a Realist Hero Rebuilt the Kingdom as Liscia Elfrieden; KiraKira☆Precure A la Mode as Kirarin/Ciel Kirahoshi/Cure Parfait; Mashin Sentai Kiramager as Mabushina; My Monster Secret as Nagisa Aizawa; A Place Further than the Universe as Mari Tamaki; The Quintessential Quintuplets as Itsuki Nakano; Re:Zero as Rem; School-Live! as Yuki Takeya; Sleepy Princess in the Demon Castle as Princess Syalis; Symphogear as Carol Malus Deinheim; Tsuredure Children as Chizuru Takano
- Height: 154 cm (5 ft 1 in)
- Musical career
- Genres: J-Pop; Anison
- Instrument: Vocals
- Years active: 2015–present
- Label: King Records (King Amusement Creative)
- Website: inoriminase.com

Inori Minase (水瀬 いのり, Minase Inori; born December 2, 1995) is a Japanese voice actress and singer affiliated with Axl One.

In March 2016, she won the Best Lead Actress Award in the 10th Seiyu Awards for her leading roles as Jun Naruse in the box office hit The Anthem of the Heart and as Yuki Takeya in the anime television series School-Live!. Her other major roles include Jeanne in The Case Study of Vanitas, Noel in Celestial Method, Misaki Sakimiya in Dead Mount Death Play, Beta/Natsume Kafka in The Eminence in Shadow, Chito in Girls' Last Tour, Hestia in Is It Wrong to Try to Pick Up Girls in a Dungeon?, Chino in Is the Order a Rabbit?, Kirarin/Ciel Kirahoshi/Cure Parfait in Kirakira☆Precure A la Mode, Tamaki "Kimari" Mari in A Place Further than the Universe, Itsuki Nakano in The Quintessential Quintuplets, Shoko Makinohara in Rascal Does Not Dream of Bunny Girl Senpai and Rascal Does Not Dream of a Dreaming Girl, and Rem in Re:Zero − Starting Life in Another World.

Her singing role is signed with King Records label as of December 2015.

== Biography ==
=== Early life and education ===
Minase was born in Tokyo on December 2, 1995. She began watching anime while in kindergarten. She first became aware of voice acting when, after watching a stage play adaptation of an anime, she read the stage pamphlet and asked her parents about the name of a person mentioned in it. She wanted to become a voice actress, while in elementary school.

Minase joined the tennis and theater clubs while at elementary school. However, she left the theater club, due to her embarrassment. Around that time, her mother found a magazine advertisement for a voice-acting audition, which she passed.

=== Acting career ===
Minase made her voice acting debut in 2010, voicing the character Akari Okamoto in the anime series Occult Academy. She then voiced minor roles in anime in the 2013 series Love Lab and the 2014 anime series Aldnoah.Zero. Her first main roles came later in 2014 as Mirai Nazukari in Locodol and Chino Kafū in Is the Order a Rabbit?, as well as Jun Naruse in the animated film The Anthem of the Heart. Minase and her co-stars from Is the Order a Rabbit? performed the songs "Daydream Café" and "Poppin Jump", which are used as the series' opening and closing themes, respectively.

In 2015, Minase voiced Hestia in the anime series Is It Wrong to Try to Pick Up Girls in a Dungeon?. She also voiced Yuki Takeya in School-Live!, Carol Malus Dienheim in Symphogear GX, and Nekone in Utawarerumono: Itsuwari no Kamen. That same year, she won the Best Lead Actress Award at the 10th Seiyu Awards for her roles as Jun Naruse and Yuki Takeya.

In 2016, she voiced Rem in Re:Zero − Starting Life in Another World and also performed the insert song "Wishing", which was used in the series' eighteenth episode. She also played Shamille Kitra Katvarnmaninik in Alderamin on the Sky, Fuuka Reventon in ViVid Strike!, Mana Asuha in Luck & Logic, and Akane Segawa in And You Thought There Is Never a Girl Online?. In 2017, she voiced Meteora Österreich in Re:Creators, Tapris Sugarbell Chisaki in Gabriel DropOut, Chizuru Takano in Tsuredure Children, and Yoshino Koiwai in Masamune-kun's Revenge. In 2018, she voiced Mari Tamaki in A Place Further than the Universe, and with her co-stars performed the series' closing theme "Koko Kara, Koko Kara".

=== Music career ===
Minase made her solo music debut in 2015, affiliated with King Records. She released her first single "Yume no Tsubomi" (夢のつぼみ) on December 2, 2015; the single peaked at 11th place on the Oricon Weekly Singles Chart and stayed on the chart for 10 weeks.

She released her second single, "Harmony Ribbon" which was released on April 13, 2016; it peaked at 10th place on the Oricon Weekly Single Chart.

On November 25, 2016, Sony Music Artists and King Records announced that they were cancelling several events for her after she received a death threat online. The threat came from Taiwan.

She released her third single, "Starry Wish" on November 9, 2016; the single peaked at 8th place on the Oricon Weekly Singles Chart. "Starry Wish" was used as the ending theme song for the anime ViVid Strike!.

She released her first full album, which is titled "Innocent Flower" and was released on April 5, 2017; it peaked at 3rd on the Oricon Weekly Albums Chart and stayed on the chart for 10 weeks.

Her fourth single, "Aimaimoko" (アイマイモコ) was released on August 9, 2017; the single peaked at 12th place on the Oricon Weekly Singles. The song in the single was used as the opening theme song for the anime, Tsuredure Children.

Her fifth single, "Ready Steady Go!" was released on December 11, 2017; it peaked at 9th place on the Oricon Weekly Singles Chart.

On December 2, 2017, Inori Minase held her first live concert, which was titled "Inori Minase 1st LIVE Ready Steady Go!", in Tokyo International Forum. Her official fanclub, "Inorimachi" (いのりまち, lit. 'Inori Town'), was launched on the same day. A Blu-ray recording of the concert was released on April 4, 2018; it peaked on 6th place on the Oricon Weekly Blu-ray Chart.

In 2018, she participated in the "KIRIN LEMON Tribute" project to celebrate the 90th anniversary of Kirin Beverage's long-selling carbonated drink brand Kirin Lemon as the third artist following the idol group "BiSH" and the rock band "Frederick".

Her 2nd full album named "BLUE COMPASS" was released on May 23, 2018; it peaked at 7th place on the Oricon Weekly Album Chart. The lead track "Million Futures" from her 2nd full album was used as the theme song for the new chapter of Square Enix's smartphone app Kai-ri-Sei Million Arthur.

She held her first solo live tour entitled, "Inori Minase LIVE TOUR 2018 BLUE COMPASS", at 4 major cities across Japan starting on June 9. The tour is named after her second album, BLUE COMPASS, which was released in May. She also announced about her joining King Super Live 2018 at Tokyo Dome on September 24 and in Taiwan on September 30. A Blu-ray edition of the tour was released on October 17 of the same year the live tour was held; it peaked at 3rd place Oricon Weekly Blu-ray Chart.

Her sixth single, "TRUST IN ETERNITY" was released on October 17, 2018; it peaked at tenth place on the Oricon Weekly Singles Chart. The titular song was used as the theme song for Square Enix and Aiming's co-produced smartphone game GESTALT ODIN.

Her seventh single, "Wonder Caravan!" was released on January 23, 2019; it peaked at seventh place on the Oricon Weekly Singles Chart. The titular song from the single was used as the ending theme song for the anime Endro!.

Her third album named "Catch the Rainbow!" was released on April 10, 2019; it peaked at 6th place on the Oricon Weekly Album Chart. Minase participated in the selection of songs and also conveys requests for lyrics and composition, and in the production of albums, her opinion is also reflected on the theme and title. She wrote the album's title track.

On June 26, 2019; she released her first music clip collection "Inori Minase MUSIC CLIP BOX". A Blu-ray edition of the music clip collection peaked at 4th place Oricon Weekly Blu-ray Chart.

She held her second solo live tour, which was titled "Inori Minase LIVE TOUR 2019 Catch the Rainbow!", at three major cities in Japan starting on June 15, 2019. The final live tour was held at Nippon Budokan, it was held for two days, attracted a total of 18,000 spectators. This was the first time she had a live show at Budokan alone. A Blu-ray edition of the tour was released on October 23 of the same year the live tour was held; it peaked at 4th place Oricon Weekly Blu-ray Chart.

Her eighth single, "Kokoro Somali", was released on February 5, 2020; it peaked at 5th place on the Oricon Weekly Singles Chart. The titular song from the single, in which she wrote the lyrics herself (about her love for her parents), was used as the ending theme song for the anime Somali and the Forest Spirit.

Her third solo live tour, which was titled "Inori Minase LIVE TOUR 2020 We Are Now", was scheduled for June and July 2020, but all scheduled performances have been canceled due to the COVID-19 pandemic.

Her ninth single, "Starlight Museum", was released on December 2, 2020; it peaked at 7th place on the Oricon Weekly Singles Chart. The titular song from the single was used as the monthly opening song for December 2020 for the TV Asahi's tv music program music-ru-TV.

The live performance held at Yokohama Arena in December 5, 2020, which was titled "Inori Minase 5th ANNIVERSARY LIVE Starry Wishes", although the performance was held without an audience due to the influence of the COVID-19 pandemic, the live performance recorded at the same venue was viewing only via video streaming. A Blu-ray edition of the live performance was released on March 24 of the next year; it peaked at 6th place Oricon Weekly Blu-ray Chart.

Her tenth single, "HELLO HORIZON", was released on July 21, 2021; it peaked at 7th place on the Oricon Weekly Singles Chart. The titular song from the single was used as the opening song for the anime How a Realist Hero Rebuilt the Kingdom.

She held her solo live tour, which was titled "Inori Minase LIVE TOUR 2021 HELLO HORIZON", this live tour, which started on September 18, 2021, was held in five major cities in Japan as the first audience performance in two years. The final performance was held at Yokohama Arena, her first performance with an audience. A Blu-ray edition of the tour was released on February 23 of the next year the live tour was held; it peaked at 5th place Oricon Weekly Blu-ray Chart.

Her fourth album named "glow" was released on July 20, 2022; it peaked at 4th place on the Oricon Weekly Album Chart. This work includes songs provided to Minase for the first time by Unison Square Garden's Tomoya Tabuchi and others.

She held her solo live tour, which was titled "Inori Minase LIVE TOUR 2022 glow", at five major cities in Japan starting on September 10, 2022. A Blu-ray edition of the tour was released on April 19 of the next year the live tour was held; it peaked at 3rd place Oricon Weekly Blu-ray Chart.

Her eleventh single, "Iolite (アイオライト)", was released on April 19, 2023; it peaked at 7th place on the Oricon Weekly Singles Chart. The titular song from the single was used as the ending song for the anime Dead Mount Death Play (Part 1).

Her twelfth single, "SCRAP ART (スクラップアート)", was released on September 13, 2023; it peaked at 8th place on the Oricon Weekly Singles Chart. The titular song from the single was used as the opening song for the anime Dead Mount Death Play (Part 2). She held her solo live tour, which was titled "Inori Minase LIVE TOUR 2023 SCRAP ART", at five major cities in Japan starting on September 17, 2023. The final performance was held at Pia Arena MM for two days.

At her fan club event, "Inorimachi-Chōmin-shūkai" (いのりまち町民集会, lit. 'Inori Town people's meeting'), held in Nagoya on March 2, 2024, it was announced that a live tour of six places will be held from September to November of the same year.

This live tour was named "Inori Minase LIVE TOUR 2024 heart bookmark" after the half album "heart bookmark" released on August 21 of the same year, at six major cities (There are two cities, Sapporo and Hiroshima, in which she will perform live for the first time) in Japan starting on September 15, 2024. The final performance was held at LaLa arena TOKYO-BAY for two days, attracted a total of 19,000 spectators.

=== Other activities ===
Minase started a radio show titled Inori Minase MELODY FLAG at the Nippon Cultural Broadcasting radio station in Tokyo on October 2, 2016. As of June 2, 2024, the radio program has reached a total of 400 episodes.

== Filmography ==
=== Anime series ===
| Year | Title | Role | Other notes | Sources |
|---|---|---|---|---|
| 2010 | Occult Academy | Akari Okamoto | | |
| 2011 | Uta no Prince-sama – Maji Love 1000% | female high school student, Syo (young) | | |
| 2012 | Symphogear | researcher B, schoolgirl trio 3, women | | |
| 2012 | Listen to Me, Girls. I Am Your Father! | kindergartener | | |
| 2013 | Uta no Prince-sama – Maji Love 2000% | child, girl, Cecil (young) | | |
| 2013 | Super Seisyun Brothers | Shiyo Kohara | | |
| 2013 | Love Lab | Suzune Tanahashi | | |
| 2014 | Aldnoah.Zero | Eddelrittuo | also 2015 | |
| 2014 | Atelier Escha & Logy: Alchemists of the Dusk Sky | Girl | Episode 12 | |
| 2014 | Black Bullet | Asaka Mibu | | |
| 2014 | Locodol | Mirai Nazukari | | |
| 2014 | Is the Order a Rabbit? | Chino Kafū | | |
| 2014 | Nobunaga the Fool | Chibihane, Toku | | |
| 2014 | Robot Girls Z | Gre-chan/Great Mazinger | | |
| 2014 | Your Lie in April | Koharu Seto | | |
| 2014 | Celestial Method | Noel | | |
| 2014 | Sugar Soldier | Makoto Kisaragi | | |
| 2015 | Aria the Scarlet Ammo AA | Nonoka Mamiya | | |
| 2015 | Charlotte | Sekiguchi Iori | | |
| 2015 | Comet Lucifer | Mo Litika Sheshes Ura | | |
| 2015 | Is It Wrong to Try to Pick Up Girls in a Dungeon? | Hestia | | |
| 2015 | Is the Order a Rabbit?? | Chino Kafū | | |
| 2015 | My Monster Secret | Nagisa Aizawa | | |
| 2015 | Miritari! | Sergeant Shachirof | | |
| 2015 | School-Live! | Yuki Takeya | | |
| 2015 | Your Lie in April | Koharu Seto | | |
| 2015 | Senki Zesshō Symphogear GX | Carol Malus Dienheim | | |
| 2015 | Utawarerumono: The False Faces | Nekone | | |
| 2016 | Alderamin on the Sky | Shamille Kitra Katvarnmaninik | | |
| 2016 | Danganronpa 3: The End of Hope's Peak High School Mirai-hen | Ruruka Andō | | |
| 2016 | Divine Gate | Shakespeare | | |
| 2016 | Heavy Object | Orihime | | |
| 2016 | Love Live! Sunshine!! | Student | Episode 12 | |
| 2016 | Luck & Logic | Mana Asuha | | |
| 2016 | And you thought there is never a girl online? | Akane Segawa/Schwein | | |
| 2016 | ViVid Strike! | Fuuka Reventon | | |
| 2016 | Magical Girl Raising Project | Swim Swim | | |
| 2016 | Nobunaga no Shinobi | Chidori | | |
| 2016 | Snow White with the Red Hair 2 | Rona Shenazard | | |
| 2016 | Re:Zero − Starting Life in Another World | Rem | | |
| 2016 | Ragnastrike Angels | Moka Mihime | | |
| 2016 | Digimon Universe: Appli Monsters | Hajime Katsura | | |
| 2017 | Masamune-kun's Revenge | Yoshino Koiwai | | |
| 2017 | Sakura Quest | Sawano Moe | | |
| 2017 | WorldEnd | Nopht Keh Desperatio | | |
| 2017 | Gabriel DropOut | Tapris Sugarbell Chisaki | | |
| 2017 | Kino no Tabi: The Beautiful World – The Animated Series | Photo | | |
| 2017 | Chaos;Child | Uki Yamazoe | | |
| 2017 | Anime-Gatari | Maya Asagaya | | |
| 2017 | Re:Creators | Meteora Österreich | | |
| 2017 | Kirakira PreCure a la Mode | Kirarin / Ciel Kirahoshi / Cure Parfait | | |
| 2017 | Tsuredure Children | Chizuru Takano | | |
| 2017 | 18if | Nene Higashiyama | | |
| 2017 | Girls' Last Tour | Chito | | |
| 2017 | Himouto! Umaru-chan R | Kongou Hikari | | |
| 2018 | A Place Further than the Universe | Mari Tamaki | | |
| 2018 | Katana Maidens ~ Toji No Miko | Yume Tsubakuro | | |
| 2018 | Basilisk: The Ōka Ninja Scrolls | Hibiki Iga | | |
| 2018 | Slow Start | Nanae Takahashi | | |
| 2018 | Pop Team Epic | Shizuku Tsukino | | |
| 2018 | Nobunaga no Shinobi: Anegawa Ishiyama Hen | Chidori | | |
| 2018 | Lupin the Third Part 5 | Ami Enan | | |
| 2018 | Tada Never Falls in Love | Yui Tada | | |
| 2018 | Kakuriyo: Bed and Breakfast for Spirits | Umibozu | | |
| 2018 | Crayon Shin-chan | Kyara Bendorihhi Norihei | | |
| 2018 | One Room 2nd Season | Mashiro Amatsuki | | |
| 2018 | Kirakira Happy★ Hirake! Cocotama | Ribbon | | |
| 2018 | Grand Blue | Mix Voice B | Episode 8 | |
| 2018 | Rascal Does Not Dream of Bunny Girl Senpai | Shoko Makinohara | | |
| 2018 | Inazuma Eleven: Ares no Tenbin | Nae Shiratoya | | |
| 2018 | Merc Storia: The Apathetic Boy and the Girl in a Bottle | Merc | | |
| 2018 | Million Arthur | Renkin Arthur | also 2019 | |
| 2018 | Hugtto! PreCure | Ciel Kirahoshi/Cure Parfait | Episodes 36 & 37 | |
| 2019 | W'z | Senri | | |
| 2019 | The Quintessential Quintuplets | Itsuki Nakano | | |
| 2019 | Endro! | Mather "Mei" Enderstto | | |
| 2019 | Isekai Quartet | Rem | | |
| 2019 | Astra Lost in Space | Aries Spring | | |
| 2019 | Senki Zesshou Symphogear XV | Carol Malus Dienheim | | |
| 2019 | The Case Files of Lord El-Melloi II: Rail Zeppelin Grace Note | Reines El-Melloi Archisorte | | |
| 2019 | Is It Wrong to Try to Pick Up Girls in a Dungeon? II | Hestia | | |
| 2019 | Z/X Code reunion | Ena Soranokawa | | |
| 2019 | No Guns Life | Pepper | | |
| 2020 | Somali and the Forest Spirit | Somali | | |
| 2020 | Isekai Quartet 2 | Rem | | |
| 2020 | My Next Life as a Villainess: All Routes Lead to Doom! | Sophia Ascart | | |
| 2020 | Komatta Jii-san | Old Lady | | |
| 2020 | Ojarumaru | Tereko; Momo | 23rd series episode 22 "Tazan Flea Market e Iku" (多山 フリーマーケットへ行く); 23rd series episode 23 "Tsukkii no Senaka de Koi" (ツッキーの背中で恋) | |
| 2020 | Re:Zero − Starting Life in Another World 2nd Season | Rem | | |
| 2020 | Kuma Kuma Kuma Bear | Shia Foschurose | | |
| 2020 | Is the Order a Rabbit? BLOOM | Chino Kafū | | |
| 2020 | Is It Wrong to Try to Pick Up Girls in a Dungeon? III | Hestia | | |
| 2020 | Sleepy Princess in the Demon Castle | Princess Syalis | | |
| 2020 | Assault Lily Bouquet | Moyu Mashima | | |
| 2021 | The Quintessential Quintuplets 2nd Season | Itsuki Nakano | | |
| 2021 | Osamake | Kuroha Shida | | |
| 2021 | The Case Study of Vanitas | Jeanne | | |
| 2021 | The Duke of Death and His Maid | Viola | | |
| 2021 | How a Realist Hero Rebuilt the Kingdom | Liscia Elfrieden | | |
| 2021 | My Next Life as a Villainess: All Routes Lead to Doom! X | Sophia Ascart | | |
| 2021 | Doraemon | General of the Dorayaki Planet | Doraemon Birthday Special 2021 | |
| 2021 | Takt Op. Destiny | Heaven | | |
| 2022 | Princess Connect! Re:Dive Season 2 | Kasumi | | |
| 2022 | Aharen-san Is Indecipherable | Reina Aharen | | |
| 2022 | Fanfare of Adolescence | Eri Shimotsuki | | |
| 2022 | Heroines Run the Show | Hiyori Suzumi | | |
| 2022 | Made in Abyss: The Golden City of the Scorching Sun | Prushka | | |
| 2022 | Utawarerumono: Mask of Truth | Nekone | | |
| 2022 | Boruto: Naruto Next Generations | Kae Yukiwari | Kawaki & Himawari Ninja Academy Arc | |
| 2022 | Detective Conan: The Culprit Hanzawa | Pometarō | | |
| 2022 | The Eminence in Shadow | Beta | | |
| 2023 | The Legend of Heroes: Trails of Cold Steel – Northern War | Altina Orion | | |
| 2023 | Me & Roboco | Weak-Kneed Roboco | | |
| 2023 | Spy Classroom | Erna | | |
| 2023 | Dead Mount Death Play | Misaki Sakimiya | | |
| 2023 | Kuma Kuma Kuma Bear Punch! | Shia Foschurose | | |
| 2023 | Masamune-kun's Revenge R | Yoshino Koiwai | | |
| 2023 | My Love Story with Yamada-kun at Lv999 | Akane Kinoshita | | |
| 2023 | The Eminence in Shadow 2nd Season | Beta | | |
| 2023 | Protocol: Rain | Nozomi Inazuki | | |
| 2023 | Ragna Crimson | Leonica | | |
| 2024 | Sasaki and Peeps | Magical Pink | | |
| 2024 | Acro Trip | Berry Blossom/Kaju Noichigo | | |
| 2024 | That Time I Got Reincarnated as a Slime | Maribel (Mariabell) Rosso | | |
| 2024 | Urusei Yatsura | Karula | | |
| 2024 | No Longer Allowed in Another World | Charlotte | | |
| 2025 | Farmagia | Chica | | |
| 2025 | To Be Hero X | Lucky Cyan | | |
| 2025 | Private Tutor to the Duke's Daughter | Stella Howard | | |
| 2025 | Monster Strike: Deadverse Reloaded | Neo | | |
| 2026 | Playing Death Games to Put Food on the Table | Kinko | | |
| 2026 | The World Is Dancing | Chiharu | | |
| 2026 | Draw This, Then Die! | Hikaru Sekiryū | | |
| 2026 | Though I Am an Inept Villainess | Ran Hōshun | | |
| 2026 | Jaadugar: A Witch in Mongolia | Khulan | | |
| 2027 | A Pen, Handcuffs, and a Common-Law Marriage | Tsugumi Kuchinashi | | |

=== Original video animation ===
| Year | Title | Role |
|---|---|---|
| 2014 | Suisei no Gargantia ~Meguru Kōro, Haruka~ | Reema |
| 2015 | Futsū no Joshikōsei ga Locodol Yattemita | Mirai Nazukari |
| 2016 | Is It Wrong to Try to Pick Up Girls in a Dungeon? | Hestia |
| 2017 | Super Danganronpa 2.5 | Ruruka Ando |
| 2018 | Masamune-kun no Revenge | Yoshino Koiwai |
| 2018 | Re: Zero Starting Life in Another World – Memory Snow | Rem |
| 2019 | Is the Order a Rabbit?? ~Sing For You~ | Chino Kafū |

=== Original net animation ===
| Year | Title | Role |
|---|---|---|
| 2015 | Robot Girls Z+ | Gre-chan/Great Mazinger |
| 2018 | Saint Seiya: Saintia Sho | Saori Kido |
| 2019 | Gundam Build Divers Re:Rise | Eve |
| 2021 | The Heike Story | Shizuka Gozen |
| 2023 | Good Night World | Aya Arima |

=== Anime films ===
| Year | Title | Role |
|---|---|---|
| 2015 | Anata o Zutto Aishiteru | Mesomeso |
| 2015 | The Anthem of the Heart | Jun Naruse |
| 2015 | Animegatari | Maya |
| 2017 | Kirakira☆Pretty Cure a la Mode Paritto! Omoide Mille-feuille! | Ciel Kirahoshi / Cure Parfait / Kirarin |
| 2017 | Is the Order a Rabbit?? ～Dear My Sister～ | Chino Kafū |
| 2017 | Chaos;Child: Silent Sky | Uki Yamazoe |
| 2018 | Pretty Cure Super Stars! | Ciel Kirahoshi / Cure Parfait / Kirarin |
| 2018 | Eiga Shimajirou Mahou no Shima no Daibouken | Aura |
| 2018 | Pokémon the Movie: The Power of Us | Lily |
| 2018 | FLCL Progressive | Unjakurou Hidomi |
| 2018 | Hug! Pretty Cure Futari wa Pretty Cure: All Stars Memories | Ciel Kirahoshi / Cure Parfait |
| 2019 | Even if the World Will End Tomorrow | Riko |
| 2019 | Made in Abyss: Wandering Twilight | Prushka |
| 2019 | Is It Wrong to Try to Pick Up Girls in a Dungeon?: Arrow of the Orion | Hestia |
| 2019 | Rascal Does Not Dream of a Dreaming Girl | Shoko Makinohara |
| 2020 | Made in Abyss: Dawn of the Deep Soul | Prushka |
| 2021 | Knights of Sidonia: Love Woven in the Stars | Iroha Hashine |
| 2021 | Sword Art Online Progressive: Aria of a Starless Night | Mito |
| 2022 | The Quintessential Quintuplets Movie | Itsuki Nakano |
| 2022 | Teasing Master Takagi-san: The Movie | Hana |
| 2022 | Drifting Home | Reina Haba |
| 2022 | Break of Dawn | Honoka Kawai |
| 2022 | Sword Art Online Progressive: Scherzo of Deep Night | Mito |
| 2023 | Doraemon: Nobita's Sky Utopia | Hanna |
| 2023 | Rascal Does Not Dream of a Sister Venturing Out | Shoko Makinohara |
| 2023 | Rascal Does Not Dream of a Knapsack Kid | Shoko Makinohara |
| 2023 | My Next Life as a Villainess: All Routes Lead to Doom! The Movie | Sophia Ascart |
| 2025 | Dream Animals: The Movie | Cat |
| 2025 | Whoever Steals This Book | Kazune Mikura |
| 2026 | Rascal Does Not Dream of a Dear Friend | Shoko Makinohara |
| 2027 | The Eminence in Shadow: Lost Echoes | Beta |

=== Video games ===
| Year | Title | Role |
|---|---|---|
| 2012 | Ciel Nosurge | Casty Riernoit |
| 2013 | Xblaze Code: Embryo | Mei Amanohokosaka |
| 2013 | BlazBlue: Chrono Phantasma | Homura Amanohokosaka |
| 2014 | Ar Nosurge | Casty Riernoit |
| 2014 | Omega Quintet | Nene |
| 2014 | Chaos;Child | Uki Yamazoe |
| 2014 | 82H Blossom | Haruna Maeda |
| 2014 | Tokyo 7th Sisters | Coney Rokusaki, Nicole Nanasaki |
| 2014 | Robot Girls Z Online | Gre-chan/Great Mazinger |
| 2015 | Tokyo Mirage Sessions ♯FE | Tsubasa Oribe |
| 2015 | Utawarerumono: Itsuwari no Kamen | Nekone |
| 2015 | Ange Vierge ～Girls Battle～ | Kurukiāta |
| 2015 | Xblaze Lost: Memories | Mei Amanohokosaka |
| 2015 | Kaden Shoujo | Hibiki |
| 2015 | Quiz RPG: The World of Mystic Wiz | Claria Sharururie |
| 2015 | Shooting Girl | M16A1 |
| 2015 | Rage of Bahamut | Till |
| 2015 | Megadimension Neptunia VII | Million Arthur |
| 2015 | School Fanfare | Fukiishi Kanae |
| 2015 | Nitroplus Blasters – HEROINES INFINITE DUEL - | Takeya Yuki |
| 2015 | Princess Connect! | Kirihara Kasumi |
| 2015 | Help!!︎!〜Koi Gaoka Gakuen o Tasuke-bu〜 | Chachamaru Meu |
| 2015 | Pop-up Story: Mahō no Moto to Seiju no Gakuen | Misty Shake |
| 2015 | Miracle Girls Festival | Chino |
| 2015 | Yome Collection | Chino, Nekone |
| 2015 | Royal Flash Heroes | Charlotte, Quincy Rennitz, Elsia |
| 2015 | Lord of Vermilion Arena | Catherine=Keiron |
| 2016 | Is the Order a Rabbit?? Wonderful Party! | Chino Kafū |
| 2016 | Shironeko Project | Noa |
| 2016 | Ange Vierge ～Girls Battle～ | Lemon Mad Bear |
| 2016 | Utawarerumono Futari no Hakuoro | Nekone |
| 2016 | Hortensia Saga-Ao no Kishi-dan- | Korun |
| 2016 | Genjuu Keiyaku Cryptract | Yaoyorozu |
| 2016 | Cardfight!! Vanguard G: Stride to Victory!! | Alice Amane |
| 2016 | Granblue Fantasy | Diantha |
| 2016 | Grimoire 〜Shiritsu Grimoire Mahou Gakuen〜 | Takeya Yuki |
| 2016 | Shinkukan Dolls | Alicia |
| 2016 | Liberation of the Blue Sky | Noel |
| 2016 | Chain Chronicle 〜Kizuna no Shintairiku 〜 | Nekone, Bere, Hestia |
| 2016 | Nejimaki Seirei Senki: Tenkyou no Alderamin ROAD OF ROYAL KNIGHTS | Kitora Katjvanmaninik Chamille |
| 2016 | Period Zero | Sasaki Yuuka |
| 2016 | Black Rose Suspects | Sophie Belts |
| 2016 | Bravery Chronicle | Mirine |
| 2016 | Flight Formation Girls -Formation Girls- | Fubuki Maiya |
| 2016 | Houkago Girls Tribe | Cherry Blackwell |
| 2016 | Magia Connect | Orutoroia |
| 2016 | Metal Senki | Kate, Angie |
| 2016 | Ragnastrike Angels | Mihime Moka |
| 2016 | Lemuria 〜Strada Of Chain〜 | Iori |
| 2017 | The Legend of Heroes: Trails of Cold Steel III | Altina Orion |
| 2017 | Girl Friend Beta | Chino |
| 2017 | CHAOS;CHILD Love chu☆chu!! | Yamazoe Uki |
| 2017 | Kirara Fantasia | Takeya Yuki |
| 2017 | Xenoblade Chronicles 2 | Kasandra (Kasane) |
| 2017 | Senki Zesshou Symphogear XD UNLIMITED | Carol Malus Dienheim |
| 2017 | Twintail on the Battlefield | Konderīnā |
| 2017 | Dungeon Travelers 2-2 Yami Ochi no Otome to Hajimari no Sho | Nekone |
| 2017 | Is It Wrong to Try to Pick Up Girls in a Dungeon? 〜Memoria Freese〜 | Hestia |
| 2017 | Pretty Cure Connection Puzzlun | Kiraboshi Ciel/Cure Parfait |
| 2017 | Mujin Sensou 2099 | Shinori Yuzuki |
| 2017 | Honyarara MAGIC (Raramagi) | Yuuki Nanami |
| 2017 | Re:Zero − Starting Life in Another World -DEATH OR KISS- | Rem |
| 2018 | Monmusume☆Harem | Gre-chan/Great Mazinger |
| 2018 | Dolls Order | Uwain |
| 2018 | Princess Connect! Re:Dive | Kasumi |
| 2018 | Eiyuu Densetsu: Sen no Kiseki IV -The End of Saga- | Altina Orion |
| 2018 | Onmyoji | Kaoru |
| 2018 | Han-Gyaku-Sei Million Arthur | Renkin Arthur |
| 2018 | Kou-Kyou-Sei Million Arthur | Gareth |
| 2018 | Wonderland Wars | Giuse |
| 2018 | Toji no Miko Kizamishi Issen no Tomoshibi (Tojitomo) | Tsubakuro Yume |
| 2018 | Ordinal Strata | Rem |
| 2018 | Sushi Striker: The Way of Sushido | Yuria |
| 2018 | Utawarerumono Zan | Nekone |
| 2018 | Danmatsuma! (Dungeon de Mattesmasu!) | Behemoth Sara/Redcap Rena |
| 2018 | Inazuma Eleven Ares no Tenbin | Nae Shiratoya |
| 2018 | Revolve Act -S- | Himari Ayatsuji |
| 2018 | Aozora Under Girls! Re:vengerS | Alice Hijikata |
| 2018 | Kyuidime | Shodonbo |
| 2018 | Brown Dust | Repitea |
| 2018 | Arc the Lad R | Nol |
| 2018 | Assassin's Creed Odyssey | Phoibe |
| 2018 | Gestalt Odin | Yui Itoha, Renkin Arthur |
| 2018 | Mashiro Witch | Kitsune Azanaeru |
| 2018 | Kirara Fantasia | Chino Kafū |
| 2018 | Daikoukai Utopia | Flora |
| 2018 | You can eat the girl | Ruru |
| 2019 | Torikago Scrap Match | Yuuyu |
| 2019 | Tokyo 7th Sisters | Nero Amagami |
| 2019 | Is It Wrong to Try to Pick Up Girls in a Dungeon? Infinite Convert | Hestia |
| 2019 | Shin Kaku Gi Kou to 11-nin no Hakaisha | Alicia=Blueforest |
| 2019 | Kousei Shoujo -Do the Scientists Dream of Girls' Asterism?- | Regulus |
| 2019 | Dragon Quest XI S: Echoes of an Elusive Age - Definitive Edition | Maya |
| 2019 | Da Capo 4 | Shiina Houjou |
| 2019 | Fate/Grand Order | Reines El-Melloi Archisorte, Sima Yi, Trimmau |
| 2019 | Dragalia Lost | Laxi |
| 2019 | Punishing: Gray Raven | No. 21 |
| 2020 | Tetote Connect | Dorothy |
| 2020 | Arknights | Archetto |
| 2020 | HoneyWorks Premium Live | Hiyori Suzumi |
| 2021 | Magia Record | Mitsune Miwa |
| 2021 | Rune Factory 5 | Priscilla |
| 2021 | The Caligula Effect 2 | #QP |
| 2022 | The Diofield Chronicle | Waltaquin Redditch |
| 2022 | Star Ocean: The Divine Force | Laeticia |
| 2022 | Dragon Quest Treasures | Mia |
| 2022 | Goddess of Victory: Nikke | Soline |
| 2023 | Octopath Traveler II | Agnea Bristarni |
| 2023 | Wizardry Variants Daphne | Lulunarde |
| 2023 | Genshin Impact | Furina, Focalors |
| 2024 | Eversoul | Talia |
| 2025 | Shuten Order | Honoka Kokushikan |
| 2026 | Dissidia Duellum Final Fantasy | Iroha |
| TBA | Goblin Slayer Another Adventurer: Nightmare Feast | Blood Princess |

=== Dubbing ===
| Year | Title | Role | Voice dub for | Other notes |
|---|---|---|---|---|
| 2017 | Spider-Man: Homecoming | Betty Brant | Angourie Rice | |
| 2018 | Jumanji: Welcome to the Jungle | Martha Kaply | Morgan Turner | |
| 2018 | We're Going on a Bear Hunt | Rosie | Elsie Cavalier | |
| 2019 | Spider-Man: Far From Home | Betty Brant | Angourie Rice | |
| 2019 | Jumanji: The Next Level | Martha Kaply | Morgan Turner | |
| 2021 | Tom & Jerry | Kayla | Chloë Grace Moretz | |
| 2021 | Playmobil: The Movie | Charlie Brenner | Gabriel Bateman | |
| 2021 | Dota: Dragon's Blood | Filomena | Genevieve Beardslee | Episode 7 |
| 2022 | Spider-Man: No Way Home | Betty Brant | Angourie Rice | |
| 2022 | Top Gun: Maverick | Amelia Benjamin | Lyliana Wray | |
| 2023 | Silent Night | Sophie | Lily-Rose Depp | |
| 2024 | Hailey's On It! | Hailey Banks | Auliʻi Cravalho | |
| 2024 | Ride On | Xiao Bao | Liu Haocun | |
| 2025 | Jurassic World Rebirth | Isabella Delgado | Audrina Miranda | |

=== TV drama ===
| Year | Title | Role | Other notes |
|---|---|---|---|
| 2013 | Amachan | Rina Narita | |
| 2015 | Anohana: The Flower We Saw That Day | Waitress | Cameo |
| 2020 | Mashin Sentai Kiramager | Mabushina | Voice role |

=== Live-action films ===
| Year | Title | Role | Other notes |
|---|---|---|---|
| 2017 | The Anthem of the Heart | high-school student | |
| 2021 | Mashin Sentai Kiramager THE MOVIE: Bee-Bop Dream | Mabushina | Voice role |
| 2022 | Kikai Sentai Zenkaiger VS Kiramager VS Senpaiger | Mabushina | Voice role |
| 2025 | My Love Story with Yamada-kun at Lv999 | Akane | Voice role |

=== Other ===
| Year | Title | Role | Other notes |
|---|---|---|---|
| 2013 | CeVIO Creative Studio | Sato Sasara | |
| 2021 | CeVIO AI | Sato Sasara | |

== Discography ==
=== Albums ===
| # | Release date | Title | Album details | Chart peak |
|---|---|---|---|---|
| 1st | April 5, 2017 | Innocent Flower | Label: King (KICS-93477, KICS-3477); Formats: CD, CD+DVD | 3 |
| 2nd | May 23, 2018 | Blue Compass | Label: King (KICS-93710, KICS-3710); Formats: CD, CD+DVD | 7 |
| 3rd | April 10, 2019 | Catch the Rainbow! | Label: King (KICS-93785, KICS-3785); Formats: CD, CD+DVD | 6 |
| 4th | July 20, 2022 | Glow | Label: King (KICS-94059, KICS-4059); Formats: CD, CD+BD | 4 |

=== EPs ===
| # | Release date | Title | Album details | Chart peak |
|---|---|---|---|---|
| 1st | August 21, 2024 | Heart Bookmark | Label: King (KICS-94166, KICS-4166); Formats: CD, CD+BD | 9 |
| 2nd | September 3, 2025 | Turquoise | Label: King; Formats: CD | 11 |

=== Singles ===
| # | Release date | Title | Catalog No. | | | | | | |
| # | Release date | Title | Catalog No. | Oricon Weekly Singles Chart | Billboard Hot 100 Chart | Billboard Hot Animation Chart | Billboard Top Singles Sales Chart | Album | Tie-up |
|---|---|---|---|---|---|---|---|---|---|
| 1st | December 2, 2015 | Yume no Tsubomi (夢のつぼみ) | KICM-1641 | 11 | 44 | 7 | 11 | Innocent Flower | |
| 2nd | April 13, 2016 | Harmony Ribbon | KICM-1662 | 10 | 31 | 6 | 10 | Innocent Flower | |
| 3rd | November 9, 2016 | Starry Wish | KICM-1726 | 8 | 13 | 6 | 12 | Innocent Flower | ViVid Strike! Ending Theme |
| 4th | August 9, 2017 | Aimaimoko (アイマイモコ) | KICM-1783 | 12 | 13 | 9 | 14 | Blue Compass | Tsuredure Children Opening |
| 5th | November 29, 2017 | Ready Steady Go! | KICM-1817 | 9 | 19 | 8 | 10 | Blue Compass | |
| 6th | October 17, 2018 | Trust in Eternity | KICM-1890 | 10 | 20 | 3 | 11 | Catch the Rainbow! | Gestalt Odin Theme Song |
| 7th | January 23, 2019 | Wonder Caravan! | KICM-1914 | 7 | 13 | 4 | 7 | Catch the Rainbow! | Endro! Ending Theme |
| 8th | February 5, 2020 | Kokoro Somari (ココロソマリ) | KICM-2029 | 5 | 27 | 4 | 6 | Glow | Somali and the Forest Spirit Ending Theme |
| 9th | December 2, 2020 | Starlight Museum | KICM-2065 | 7 | 57 | 9 | 6 | Glow | Monthly opening song for December 2020 for the TV program music-ru-TV |
| 10th | July 21, 2021 | Hello Horizon | KICM-2092 | 7 | 74 | 11 | 5 | Glow | How a Realist Hero Rebuilt the Kingdom Opening Theme |
| 11th | April 19, 2023 | Iolite (アイオライト) | KICM-2128 | 7 | _ | _ | 10 | Heart Bookmark | Dead Mount Death Play (Part 1) Ending Theme |
| 12th | September 13, 2023 | SCRAP ART (スクラップアート) | KICM-2138 | 8 | _ | _ | 9 | Heart Bookmark | Dead Mount Death Play (Part 2) Opening Theme |

=== Video releases ===
| # | Release date | Title | Album details | Peak Oricon chart positions |
|---|---|---|---|---|
| 1st live Blu-ray | April 4, 2018 | Inori Minase 1st Live: Ready Steady Go! | Label: King (KIXM-315); Format: BD | 6 |
| 2nd live Blu-ray | October 17, 2018 | Inori Minase Live Tour 2018: Blue Compass | Label: King (KIXM-340); Format: BD | 3 |
| 1st music clips | June 26, 2019 | Inori Minase Music Clip Box | Label: King (KIXM-379); Format: BD | 4 |
| 3rd live Blu-ray | October 23, 2019 | Inori Minase Live Tour: Catch the Rainbow! | Label: King (KIXM-398); Format: BD | 4 |
| 4th live Blu-ray | March 24, 2021 | Inori Minase 5th Anniversary Live: Starry Wishes | Label: King (KIXM-449); Format: BD | 6 |
| 5th live Blu-ray | February 23, 2022 | Inori Minase Live Tour: Hello Horizon | Label: King (KIXM-493); Format: BD | 5 |
| 6th live Blu-ray | April 19, 2023 | Inori Minase Live Tour: glow | Label: King (KIXM-536); Format: BD | 3 |

== Concerts ==
=== Personal concerts ===
| Year | Title | Dates/Locations | Other notes | Sources |
|---|---|---|---|---|
| 2017 | Inori Minase 1st LIVE Ready Steady Go! | | | |
| 2018 | Inori Minase LIVE TOUR 2018 BLUE COMPASS | | | |
| 2019 | Inori Minase LIVE TOUR 2019 Catch the Rainbow! | | | |
| 2020 | ~~Inori Minase LIVE TOUR 2020 We Are Now~~ | | All schedule cancelled for COVID-19 pandemic. | |
| 2020 | Inori Minase 5th ANNIVERSARY LIVE Starry Wishes | | No audience for COVID-19 pandemic, viewing only via video streaming. | |
| 2021 | Inori Minase LIVE TOUR 2021 HELLO HORIZON | | | |
| 2022 | Inori Minase LIVE TOUR 2022 glow | | | |
| 2023 | Inori Minase LIVE TOUR 2023 SCRAP ART | | | |
| 2024 | Inori Minase LIVE TOUR 2024 heart bookmark | Sep 15 / Hyōgo; Sep 21 / Hiroshima; Oct 5 / Aichi; Oct 12 / Fukuoka; Oct 19 / Hokkaidō; Nov 2–3 / Chiba | | |
