= Hana no Na =

"Hana no Na 花の名"

Single by Bump of Chicken

from the album Orbital Period
- B-side: "Tokyo Sanka"
- Released: October 24, 2007
- Recorded: October 24, 2007
- Genre: Rock
- Length: 9:49
- Label: Toy's Factory; TFCC-89227
- Songwriter: Fujiwara Motoo
- Producer: ???

Bump of Chicken singles chronology
| "Namida no Furusato" (2006) | "Hana no Na 花の名" (2007) | "Mayday" (2007) |

"Hana no Na" (花の名) is the thirteenth single by Bump of Chicken, released on October 24, 2007. The title track is from the album Orbital Period. The single peaked at #1 on the Oricon Weekly Charts in front of "Mayday" (メーデー), which was released on the same day.

== Track listing ==
1. "Hana no Na" (花の名) (Fujiwara Motoo)
2. "Tokyo Sanka" (東京賛歌) (Fujiwara)
3. "Kaki" (柿) (Hidden track)

== Personnel ==
- Fujiwara Motoo — Guitar, vocals
- Masukawa Hiroaki — Guitar
- Naoi Yoshifumi — Bass
- Masu Hideo — drums

== Chart performance ==
| Chart | Peak Position |
|---|---|
| Oricon Weekly Charts | 1 |
| 2007 Oricon Top 100 Singles | 16 |
