= Snow Smile =

Single by Bump of Chicken

from the album Yggdrasil
- B-side: "Holiday"
- Released: December 18, 2002
- Recorded: ???
- Genre: Rock
- Length: 8:33
- Label: Toy's Factory; TFCC-89049
- Songwriter: Fujiwara Motoo
- Producer: ???

Bump of Chicken singles chronology
"Harujion" (2001)	"Snow Smile" (2002)	"Lost Man/Sailing Day" (2003)

"Snow Smile" (スノースマイル) is the fifth single by Bump of Chicken. The title track is from the album Yggdrasil (ユグドラシル).

== Track listing ==
All tracks written by Fujiwara Motoo.

1. "Snow Smile" (スノースマイル) — 5:07
2. "Holiday" (ホリデイ) — 3:26
3. "Tinpost: Uncle On (Hidden track) — 2:59

== Personnel ==
- Fujiwara Motoo — Guitar, vocals
- Masukawa Hiroaki — Guitar
- Naoi Yoshifumi — Bass
- Masu Hideo — Drums

== Chart performance ==
Chart	Peak Position
Oricon Weekly Charts	3
2003 Oricon Top 100 Singles	61
