= Supernova/Karma =

"Supernova/Karma Supernova/カルマ"

Single by Bump of Chicken

from the album Orbital Period
- A-side: "Karma"
- Released: November 23, 2005
- Recorded: ???
- Genre: Rock
- Length: 9:32
- Label: Toy's Factory; TFCC-89153
- Songwriter: Fujiwara Motoo
- Producer: ???

Bump of Chicken singles chronology
"Planetarium" (2005)	"Supernova/Karma; Supernova/カルマ" (2005)	"Karma/Supernova" (2005)

"Supernova/Karma" (supernova/カルマ) is the eleventh single by Bump of Chicken, released on November 23, 2005. The title tracks are from the album Orbital Period. "Karma" was used as the opening theme for the video game and animated series Tales of the Abyss.

== Reception ==
RPGFan noted "Supernova" as "a very nice song" that has a "simple but pleasant melody with soft vocals". They liked "Karma" more and said: "It has a very solid melody that I was instantly engaged in, and a very good vocalist to complement it."

== Track listing ==
All tracks written by Fujiwara Motoo.

1. "supernova"
2. "Karma" (カルマ)
3. "Wasshoi (Limited Edition)" (ワッショイ（通常盤）) (Hidden Track)

== Personnel ==
- Fujiwara Motoo — Guitar, vocals
- Masukawa Hiroaki — Guitar
- Naoi Yoshifumi — Bass
- Masu Hideo — Drums

== Chart performance ==
Chart	Peak Position
Oricon Weekly Charts	2
2006 Oricon Top 100 Singles	9
