= Kenichi Maeyamada production discography =

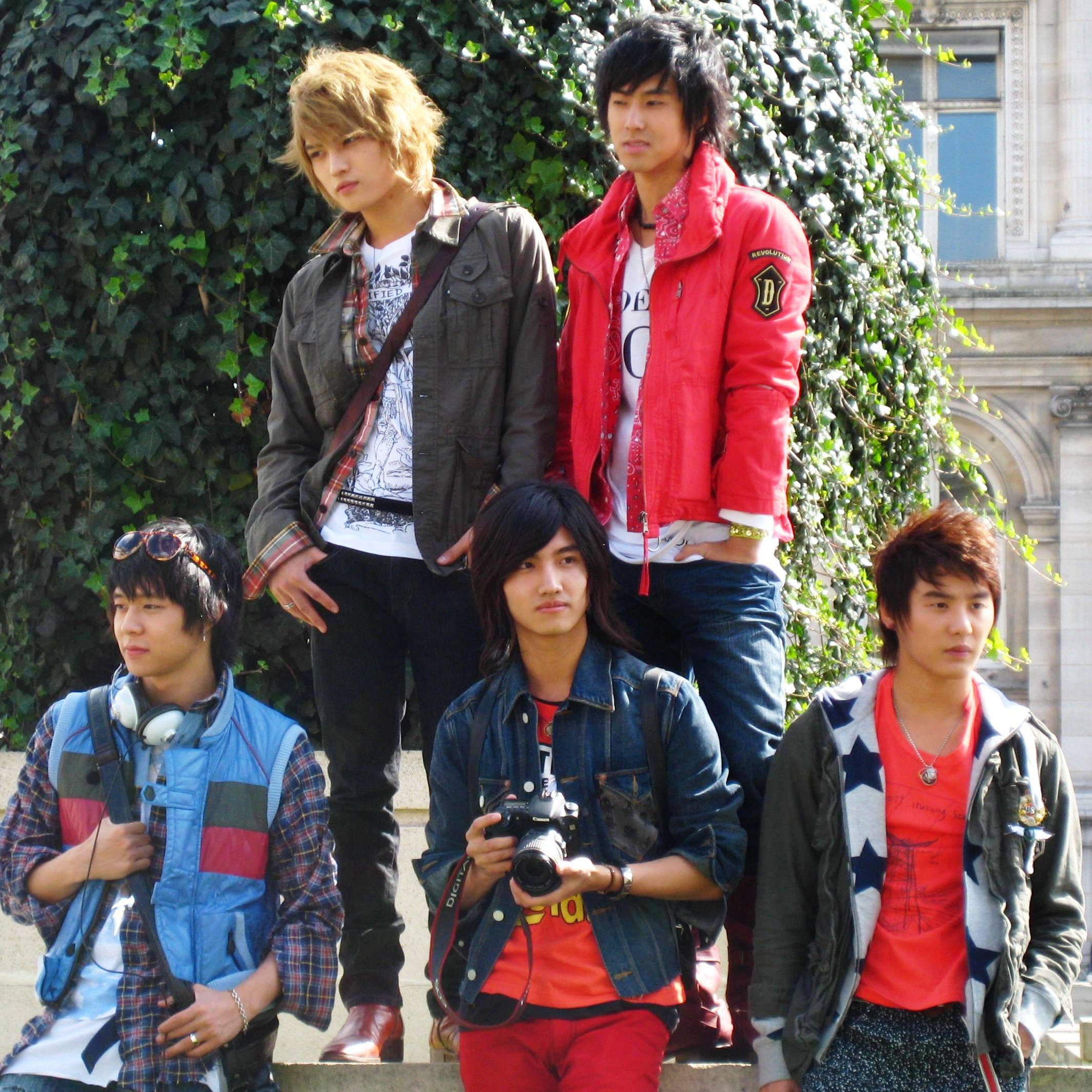
Maeyamadada's most successful song was "Share the World" performed by South Korean boyband TVXQ for the anime One Piece, which was certified triple platinum for downloads in Japan.

Japanese musician Kenichi Maeyamada, also known as Hyadain, has produced music for idol musicians, anime, games, pop musicians and television shows. Maeyamada's first production was in 2004, for the Super Eurobeat Presents Initial D Fourth Stage D Selection+ album song "Don't Go Baby", where he was credited as ED. He began producing songs for artists full-time in 2007 and 2008, including music for the anime Kirarin Revolution, including the theme songs "Tan Tan Taan!" and "Hapi Hapi Sunday!", both of which were Oricon top 10 hits. In 2009, Maeyamada produced the singles "It's All Love!" for Kumi Koda x Misono, and the anime One Piece theme song "Share the World" by TVXQ, both of which reached number 1.

Maeyamada produces much of the music released by Stardust Promotion idol groups, including Momoiro Clover Z, Shiritsu Ebisu Chugaku, Tacoyaki Rainbow and Dish. This includes Momoiro Clover's major label debut single "Ikuze! Kaitō Shōjo" (2010), "Z Densetsu: Owarinaki Kakumei" (2011) and "Mugen no Ai" (2012), all of which have been certified gold. Maeyamada also produces for Toy's Factory idol group Dempagumi.inc and occasionally AKB48 related groups, most notable No3b, and several Johnny's Entertainment acts.

Maeyamada has produced theme songs, character singles and background music for various anime, including Mitsudomoe, Squid Girl and Denpa Onna to Seishun Otoko. He writes all of the songs for the NHK Educational TV program Rekishi ni Dokiri, which feature Nakamura Shidō II performing small skits about famous figures from Japanese history.

== Songs produced for other artists ==
=== Artist Single / Album Works ===
List of songs that feature songwriting or production by Kenichi Maeyamada
Release date	Artist	Title	Album	Label	Lyricist	Composer	Arranger	Notes
2004-11-17	Maiko	"Don't Go Baby"	SUPER EUROBEAT presents INITIAL D Fourth Stage D SELECTION+ (album)	Avex Trax	Kenichi Maeyamada	Kenichi Maeyamada	Kenichi Maeyamada	Kenichi Maeyamada's first work as an apprentice; done under the alias "Ed"
2007-12-08	Maiko	"Get The Future"	Initial D Fourth Stage Music Complete Box (album)	Avex Trax	Kenichi Maeyamada	Kenichi Maeyamada	Kenichi Maeyamada	Done under the alias "Ed"
2007-12-18	AKB48	"Tonari no Banana" (となりのバナナ)	Himawarigumi 2nd Stage "Yume wo Shinaseru Wake ni Ikanai" (album)	You, Be Cool! (2013 album)	Yasushi Akimoto	Kenichi Maeyamada	Kenichi Maeyamada	Kenichi Maeyamada's first professional work
2008-07-30	Yuko Ishida	"Changes"	Changes (single)	Rhythm Zone	Kenichi Maeyamada	CHI-MEY	Kaoru Okubo	CM song for Triumph's Tenshi No Bra
2008-10-29	Milky Way	"Tan Tan Taan!" (タンタンターン!)	Tan Tan Taan! (single); Kirari to Fuyu (album)	Zetima	Kenichi Maeyamada	Kenichi Maeyamada	Kenichi Maeyamada	Anime Kirarin Revolution opening theme song; Oricon number 8 single
2008-11-05	K	"525600min.~seasons of love~"	525600min.~seasons of love~ (single); Traveling Song (album)	Sony Records	Kenichi Maeyamada	Kenichi Maeyamada	—	Inspired by Broadway Musical Rent; Oricon 49th place single
2008-12-10	Melon Kinenbi	"GIVE ME UP"	MEGA MELON (album)	Zetima	Yukinojo Mori	Michael De San Antonio, Pierre Michael Nigro, Mario Giuseppe Nigro	Kenichi Maeyamada	Originally performed by Michael Fortunati
2008-12-10	Tomiko Van	"Refrain"	Van. (album)	Avex Trax	Tomiko Van, Kenichi Maeyamada	Yoshiaki Fujisawa	Yoshiaki Fujisawa	—
2009-02-04	Kirari Tsukishima starring Koharu Kusumi (Morning Musume)	"Happy Happy Sunday!" (はぴ☆はぴ サンデー！)	Happy☆Happy Sunday! (single); Best Kirari (album)	Zetima	Kenichi Maeyamada	Kenichi Maeyamada	Kenichi Maeyamada	Anime Kirarin Revolution ending theme song; Oricon number 9 single
2009-03-31	Koda Kumi × Misono	"It's All Love!"	It's all Love! (single); UNIVERSE (album)	Rhythm Zone	Koda Kumi, misono	Kenichi Maeyamada	h-wonder	CM song for Osaka Designers' College; Nippon TV show Sukkiri! ending theme song; Oricon number 1 single
2009-04-22	TVXQ	"Share The World"	Share the World / We Are! (single); Best Selection 2010 (album)	Rhythm Zone	H.U.B	Kenichi Maeyamada	AKIRA	Anime One Piece opening theme song; Oricon number 1 single
2010-01-27	Natsuko Aso	"Perfect-area complete!"	Perfect-area complete! (single); Movement of Magic (album)	Lantis	Aki Hata	Kenichi Maeyamada	Kenichi Maeyamada	Anime Baka and Test opening theme song; Oricon number 18 single
2010-01-27	Natsuko Aso	"Dream into action!"	Perfect-area complete! (single)	Lantis	Saori Kodama	Kenichi Maeyamada	A-bee	—
2010-01-27	Tiara	"Don't Stop"	Kimi ga Oshietekureta Koto feat. SEAMO (single)	Nippon Crown	Kenichi Maeyamada, Tiara	Yasushi Watanabe	Yasushi Watanabe	—
2010-05-05	Mai Oshima	"Mendokusai Aijou" (メンドクサイ愛情)	Mendokusai Aijou (single)	Avex Trax	Ami	Kenichi Maeyamada	Kenichi Maeyamada	Nippon TV show Jack 10 ending theme song; Oricon number 7 single
2010-05-05	Momoiro Clover	"Ikuze! Kaito Shoujo" (行くぜっ!怪盗少女)	Ikuze! Kaito Shoujo (single); Battle and Romance (album)	Universal J (single); King Records (album)	Kenichi Maeyamada	Kenichi Maeyamada	Kenichi Maeyamada	TBS Television show Rank Oukoku opening theme song; Oricon number 3 single
2010-05-21	AKB48	"Hatsukoi yo, Konnichiwa" (初恋よ、こんにちは)	Team B 5th Stage "Theater no Megami" (album)	AKS	Yasushi Akimoto	Kenichi Maeyamada	Nobuhiko Kashiwara	—
2010-08-04	Natsuko Aso	"Movement of magic"	Movement of magic (album)	Lantis	Aki Hata	Kenichi Maeyamada	Kenichi Maeyamada	Show ANISONG Plus+ opening theme song for August 2010
2010-08-04	No Sleeves	"Kimi Shika" (君しか)	Kimi Shika (single)	Epic Records Japan	Yasushi Akimoto	Kenichi Maeyamada	Masanori Takumi	Nippon TV show Jack 10 ending theme song; Oricon number 6 single
2010-08-07	Shiritsu Ebisu Chuugaku	"Ebizori Diamond!!" (えびぞりダイアモンド!!)	Ebizori Diamond!! (single); Ebichu no Zeppan Best ~Owaranai Seishun~ (album)	Stardust Digital (single); Defstar Records (album)	Kenichi Maeyamada	Kenichi Maeyamada	Kenichi Maeyamada	Vocal direction by Kenichi Maeyamada
2010-08-11	Haruka Nagashima	"EQUAL Romance" (EQUALロマンス)	Fushigi Unite (single)	DWANGO User Entertainment	Neko Oikawa	Mioko Yamaguchi	Kenichi Maeyamada	Originally performed by CoCo
2010-08-11	Mai Oshima	"Ai tte Nandaho" (愛ってナンダホー)	Ai tte Nandaho (single)	Avex Trax	Ami	Kenichi Maeyamada	Kenichi Maeyamada	Oricon number 25 single
2010-11-10	Momoiro Clover	"Coco Natsu" (ココ☆ナツ)	Pinky Jones (single)	King Records	Kenichi Maeyamada	Kenichi Maeyamada	Kenichi Maeyamada	Movie Shirome theme song
2010-11-10	Natsuko Aso	"More-more LOVERS!!"	More-more LOVERS!! (single); Precious tone (album)	Lantis	Aki Hata	Kenichi Maeyamada	Kenichi Maeyamada	Anime MM! ending theme song; Oricon number 38 single
2010-11-17	YuiKaori	"HEARBTEAT ga Tomaranai!" (HEARTBEATが止まらないっ!)	HEARTBEAT ga Tomaranai! (single); Puppy (album)	King Records	Kenichi Maeyamada	Shunryu	Sizuk	—
2011-01-10	Shiritsu Ebisu Chuugaku	"Doshaburi Regret" (どしゃぶりリグレット)	Chime! / Doshaburi Regret (single); Ebichu no Zeppan Best ~Owaranai Seishun~ (album)	Stardust Digital (single); Defstar Records (album)	Kenichi Maeyamada	Kenichi Maeyamada	Kenichi Maeyamada	Vocal direction by Kenichi Maeyamada
2011-02-02	Watarirouka Hashiritai	"Hatsukoi yo, Konnichiwa" (初恋よ、こんにちは)	Valentine Kiss (single); Watarirouka wo Yukkuri Arukitai (album)	Pony Canyon	Kenichi Maeyamada	Kenichi Maeyamada	Kenichi Maeyamada	Originally performed by AKB48
2011-03-09	Momoiro Clover	"Mirai Bowl" (ミライボウル)	Mirai Bowl / Chai Maxx (single); Battle and Romance (album)	King Records	Chokkyu Murano	Tomotaka Osumi, Kenichi Maeyamada	NARASAKI	Anime Dragon Crisis! ending theme song; Oricon number 3 single
2011-03-09	Momoiro Clover	"Zenryoku Shoujo" (全力少女)	Mirai Bowl / Chai Maxx (single)	King Records	Kotori, Kenichi Maeyamada	Naoki Chiba, michitomo	michitomo	Part of a trilogy with Momoiro Clover songs "Hashire!" and "Orange Note"
2011-03-09	Natsuko Aso	"Renai Koujou committee" (恋愛向上committee)	Renai Koujou committee (single); Precious tone (album)	Lantis	Saori Kodama	Kenichi Maeyamada	Kenichi Maeyamada	Anime Baka to Test to Shoukanjuu: Matsuri opening theme song
2011-04-06	YuiKaori	"Shooting Smile" (Shooting☆Smile)	Shooting☆Smile (single); Puppy (album)	King Records	Kenichi Maeyamada	Shunryu	Sizuk	Game MicroVolts opening theme song
2011-04-06	YuiKaori	"CUE the Future ~「Q」no Theme~" (CUE the Future 〜「Q」のテーマ〜)	Shooting☆Smile (single)	King Records	Kenichi Maeyamada	Kenichi Maeyamada	Kenichi Maeyamada	Stageplay Q -Anata wa Dare?- ending theme song
2011-04-27	Shiritsu Ebisu Chuugaku	"The Tissue ~Tomaranai Seishun~" (ザ・ティッシュ〜とまらない青春〜)	The Tissue ~Tomaranai Seishun~ (single); Ebichu no Zeppan Best ~Owaranai Seishun~ (album)	Stardust Digital (single); Defstar Records (album)	Kenichi Maeyamada	Kenichi Maeyamada	Kenichi Maeyamada	Vocal direction by Kenichi Maeyamada
2011-04-27	Shiritsu Ebisu Chuugaku	"Ebichu Isshuukan" (エビ中一週間)	The Tissue ~Tomaranai Seishun~ (single); Ebichu no Zeppan Best ~Owaranai Seishun~ (album)	Stardust Digital (single); Defstar Records (album)	Kenichi Maeyamada	Kenichi Maeyamada	Kenichi Maeyamada	Originally written for Momoiro Clover but was rejected; vocal direction by Kenichi Maeyamada
2011-05-25	Sayaka Sasaki	"Zzz"	Zzz (single) sympathetic world (album)	Lantis	Kenichi Maeyamada	Kenichi Maeyamada	Kenichi Maeyamada	Anime Nichijou ending theme song; Oricon number 19 single
2011-05-25	Sayaka Sasaki	"Gakkoo Gakkoo LIFE!!" (ガッコーガッコーLIFE!!)	Zzz (single)	Lantis	Kenichi Maeyamada	Kenichi Maeyamada	Kenichi Maeyamada	—
2011-06-11	Momoiro Clover	"Akarin e Okuru Uta" (あかりんへ贈る歌)	Akarin e Okuru Uta (single)	King Records	Kenichi Maeyamada	Kenichi Maeyamada	Kenichi Maeyamada	Graduation single for Akari Hayami
2011-06-11	Momoiro Clover	"Dekomayu Honoo no Saishuu Kessen" (デコまゆ炎の最終決戦)	Akarin e no Uta (single)	King Records	Kenichi Maeyamada	Kenichi Maeyamada	Kenichi Maeyamada	Duet between Akari Hayami and Kanako Momota
2011-07-06	Momoiro Clover Z	"Z Densetsu ~Owaranaki Kakumei~" (Z伝説 〜終わりなき革命〜)	Z Densetsu ~Owarinaki Kakumei~ (single); Battle and Romance (album)	King Records	Kenichi Maeyamada	Kenichi Maeyamada	Kenichi Maeyamada	First single as Momoiro Clover Z; tie-up song for Tokyo Joypolis; Oricon number 5 single
2011-07-20	Natsuko Aso	"Eureka Baby" (エウレカベイビー)	Eureka Baby (single); Precious tone (album)	Lantis	Aki Hata	Kenichi Maeyamada	Kenichi Maeyamada	Anime Baka and Test ending theme song; Oricon number 50 single
2011-07-27	Ayaka Sasaki	"Datte Aarin Nandamon" (だって あーりんなんだもーん☆)	Battle and Romance (album); A-rin Assort (album)	King Records (album)	Kenichi Maeyamada	Kenichi Maeyamada	Kenichi Maeyamada	—
2011-07-27	Momoiro Clover Z	"Wani to Shampoo" (ワニとシャンプー)	Battle and Romance (album)	King Records	Kenichi Maeyamada	Kenichi Maeyamada	Kenichi Maeyamada	Anime Double-J ending theme song; used as an entrance song for Yuki Yanagita from the Fukuoka SoftBank Hawks
2011-07-27	Momoiro Clover Z	"Momoclo no Nippon Banzai!" (ももクロのニッポン万歳!)	Battle and Romance (album)	King Records	Kenichi Maeyamada	Kenichi Maeyamada	Kenichi Maeyamada	—
2011-07-27	Shiritsu Ebisu Chuugaku	"Oh My Ghost? ~Watashi ga Akuryou ni Natte mo~" (オーマイゴースト?〜わたしが悪霊になっても〜)	Oh My Ghost? ~Watashi ga Akuryou ni Natte mo~ (single); Ebichu no Zeppan Best ~Owaranai Seishun~ (album)	Stardust Digital (single); Defstar Records (album)	Kenichi Maeyamada	Kenichi Maeyamada	Kenichi Maeyamada	Features ghost sounds done by Kenichi Maeyamada; vocal direction by Kenichi Maeyamada
2011-07-27	Shiritsu Ebisu Chuugaku	"Gozonji! Ebichu Ondo" (ご存知！エビ中音頭)	Oh My Ghost? ~Watashi ga Akuryou ni Natte mo~ (single); Ebichu no Zeppan Best ~Owaranai Seishun~ (album)	Stardust Digital (single); Defstar Records (album)	Kenichi Maeyamada	Kenichi Maeyamada	Kenichi Maeyamada	Vocal direction by Kenichi Maeyamada
2011-09-21	YuiKaori	"PUPPY LOVE!!"	Puppy (album)	King Records	Kenichi Maeyamada	Kenichi Maeyamada	Kenichi Maeyamada	Niconico live show Denpa Kenkyuusha ending theme song for September 2011
2011-09-21	YuiKaori	"Kyuu! Kyuu! CURIOSITY!!" (キュッ! キュッ! Curiosity!!)	Puppy (album)	King Records	Kenichi Maeyamada	Kenichi Maeyamada	Kenichi Maeyamada	Yui Ogura solo song
2011-10-05	Shiritsu Ebisu Chuugaku	"Motto Hashire!!" (もっと走れっ!!)	Motto Hashire!! (single); Ebichu no Zeppan Best ~Owaranai Seishun~ (album)	Defstar Records (album)	Kenichi Maeyamada	Kenichi Maeyamada	Kenichi Maeyamada	Vocal direction by Kenichi Maeyamada
2011-10-05	Shiritsu Ebisu Chuugaku	"Eien ni Chuugakusei" (永遠に中学生)	Motto Hashire!! (single); Ebichu no Zeppan Best ~Owaranai Seishun~ (album)	Defstar Records (album)	Kenichi Maeyamada	Kenichi Maeyamada	Kenichi Maeyamada	Vocal direction by Kenichi Maeyamada
2011-11-16	Dempagumi.inc	"Future Diver"	Future Diver (single); WORLD WIDE DEMPA (album)	Toy's Factory	Aki Hata	Masaya Koike	Kenichi Maeyamada	Oricon number 46 single
2011-11-23	Momoiro Clover Z	"Santa-san" (サンタさん)	Roudou Sanka (single); MCZ WINTER SONG COLLECTION (album)	King Records	Kenichi Maeyamada	Kenichi Maeyamada	Kenichi Maeyamada	—
2011-12-18	No Sleeves	"Jessica wa Door wo Knock Shinai" (ジェシカはドアをノックしない)	Pedicure Day (single)	Epic Records Japan	Yasushi Akimoto	Kenichi Maeyamada	AKIRA	—
2011-12-25	Mikakunin Shoujotai UFI	"We are UFI!!!"	Shiroi Kaze (single)	King Records	Kenichi Maeyamada	Kenichi Maeyamada	Kenichi Maeyamada	Show Unidentified Fantastic Idol ending theme
2012-01-25	Maki Nomiya	"Baby Portable Rock" (ベイビィ・ポータブル・ロック)	30 ~Greatest Self Covers & More!!!~ (album)	Sony Music Associated Records	Yasuharu Konishi	Yasuharu Konishi	Kenichi Maeyamada	Originally performed by Pizzicato Five
2012-03-07	Momoiro Clover Z	"Mouretsu Uchuu Koukyoukyoku Dai Nana Gakushou: Mugen no Ai" (猛烈宇宙交響曲・第七楽章『無限の愛』)	Mouretsu Uchuu Koukyoukyoku Dai Nana Gakushou: Mugen no Ai (single); 5th Dimension (album)	King Records	Kenichi Maeyamada	Kenichi Maeyamada	Kenichi Maeyamada	Anime Bodacious Space Pirates opening theme song; features ex-Megadeth guitarist Marty Friedman; Oricon number 5 single
2012-03-21	ChouCho	"Million of Bravery"	Million of Bravery (single) flyleaf (album)	Lantis	Kenichi Maeyamada	Kenichi Maeyamada	Kenichi Maeyamada	Game Kaku-San-Sei Million Arthur opening theme
2012-04-18	Sekihan	"Onya no Ko Kinenbi" (おにゃのこ きねんび)	EXIT TUNES PRESENTS SEKIHAN the TREASURE (album)	EXIT TUNES	Kenichi Maeyamada	Kenichi Maeyamada	Kenichi Maeyamada	—
2012-04-21	Ayaka Sasaki	"Aarin wa Hankouki!" (あーりんは反抗期!)	Momoclo All Stars 2012 (album); A-rin Assort (album)	King Records	Kenichi Maeyamada	Kenichi Maeyamada	Kenichi Maeyamada	—
2012-04-21	Jimusho ni Osaretai	"Jimusho ni Motto Osaretai" (事務所にもっと推され隊)	Momoclo All Stars 2012 (album)	King Records	Kenichi Maeyamada	Kenichi Maeyamada	Kenichi Maeyamada	Momoiro Clover Z unit made up of Momoka Ariyasu and Reni Takagi
2012-04-21	Momotamai	"Single Bed wa Semai no Desu" (シングルベッドはせまいのです)	Momoclo All Stars 2012 (album)	King Records	Kenichi Maeyamada	Kenichi Maeyamada	Kenichi Maeyamada	Momoiro Clover Z unit made up of Kanako Momota and Shiori Tamai
2012-05-05	Shiritsu Ebisu Chuugaku	"Houkago Getabako Rock 'n' Roll MX" (放課後ゲタ箱ロッケンロールMX)	Karikeiyaku no Cinderella (single); Chuunin (album)	Defstar Records	Kenichi Maeyamada	Kenichi Maeyamada	Kenichi Maeyamada	—
2012-05-23	Aya Hirano	"PizzzzzzzA!!!!!!!"	FRAGMENTS (album)	Universal Sigma	Kenichi Maeyamada	Kenichi Maeyamada	Kenichi Maeyamada	Direction by Kenichi Maeyamada
2012-05-23	Dempagumi.inc	"Tsuyoi Kimochi Tsuyoi Ai" (強い気持ち・強い愛)	Demparade Japan / Tsuyoi Kimochi Tsuyoi Ai (single); WORLD WIDE DEMPA (album)	Toy's Factory	Kenji Ozawa	Kyohei Tsutsumi	Kenichi Maeyamada	Originally performed by Kenji Ozawa; direction by Kenichi Maeyamada; Oricon number 37 single
2012-05-23	Sayonara Ponytail	"Mukiryoku Switch (Hyadain no RiRiRiRi Remix)" (無気力スイッチ (ヒャダインのリリリリ☆リミックス))	Sora Mo Toberu Hazu / Bianca / Koisuru Sports (single)	Epic Records Japan	324P	324P	Kenichi Maeyamada	—
2012-05-30	Ken Hirai	"Onegai Julie -Hyadain no RiRiRiRi Remix-" (おねがいジュリー☆ ヒャダインのリリリリ☆リミックス)	Kokuhaku (single)	Defstar Records	Ken Hirai	Ken Hirai	Kenichi Maeyamada	—
2012-06-06	Takuma Terashima	"Ai no Uta" (あいのうた)	NEW GAME (album)	Lantis	Takuma Terashima	Kenichi Maeyamada	Kenichi Maeyamada	Direction by Kenichi Maeyamada
2012-06-24	Minami Tsuda, Tomoyo Sasaki, Akari Harashima	"Sing a Song Aloud!!"	Sing a Song Aloud!! (single)	Nippon Cultural Broadcasting Inc.	Kenichi Maeyamada	Kenichi Maeyamada	Kenichi Maeyamada	Web radio show Hama Television opening theme song
2012-07-06	Base Ball Bear	"Bokura no frai awei" (ぼくらのfrai awei)	Hatsukoi (album)	EMI Music Japan	Yusuke Koide, Kenichi Maeyamada	Yusuke Koide, Kenichi Maeyamada	Base Ball Bear	—
2012-07-18	Dempagumi.inc	"Sabotage"	Kirakira Tune / Sabotage (single); WORLD WIDE DEMPA (album)	Toy's Factory	Mike D, Adam Horovitz, Adam Yauch	Mike D, Adam Horovitz, Adam Yauch	Kenichi Maeyamada	Cover of "Sabotage" by Beastie Boys; produced by Kenichi Maeyamada; Oricon number 19 single
2012-07-25	MARiA	"We've gotta have a party!"	aMazing MusiQue PaRK (album)	DWANGO User Entertainment	Kenichi Maeyamada	Kenichi Maeyamada	Kenichi Maeyamada	—
2012-07-25	Tomohisa Yamashita	"ERO -2012 version-"	Ero (album)	Warner Music Japan	Shinji Nojima	Kenichi Maeyamada	Kenichi Maeyamada	—
2012-08-01	SMAP	"Te wo Tsunagou" (手を繋ごう)	Moment (single); SMAP 25 Years (album)	Victor Entertainment	Kenichi Maeyamada	Kenichi Maeyamada	Shunya Shizumu	—
2012-08-08	F.T. Island	"TOP SECRET"	TOP SECRET (single); RATED-FT (album)	Warner Music Japan	Kenichi Maeyamada	corin.	corin.	Music show Happy Music ending theme song for July 2012; Oricon number 6 single
2012-08-08	SMAP	"Ohayou" (おはよう)	GIFT of SMAP (album)	Victor Entertainment	Kenichi Maeyamada	Kenichi Maeyamada	Ryosuke Nakanishi	—
2012-08-15	MEG	"SOUTHPAW"	WEAR I AM (album)	King Records	MEG, Kenichi Maeyamada	Kenichi Maeyamada	Taku Takahashi, Mitsunori Ikeda	—
2012-08-15	Shoko Nakagawa	"Uchuu de Propose" (宇宙でプロポーズ)	nsum ~Nakagawa Shoko ga Utattemita!~ (album)	Sony Music Records	Kenichi Maeyamada	Kenichi Maeyamada	Kenichi Maeyamada	Theme song for SunshineCity×KONICA MINOLTA AQUA STAR TREE; produced by Kenichi Maeyamada
2012-08-22	Risa Yoshiki	"Vocalo ga Rival" (ボカロがライバル☆)	Vocalo ga Rival☆ (single); Pentomino (album)	Nippon Columbia	Kenichi Maeyamada	Kenichi Maeyamada	Kenichi Maeyamada	TBS Television show Rank Oukoku opening theme song; produced by Kenichi Maeyamada; Oricon number 44 single
2012-08-29	Shiritsu Ebisu Chuugaku	"Go! Go! Here We Go! Rock Lee" (Go!Go!Here We Go!ロック・リー)	Go! Go! Here We Go! Rock Lee / Otona wa Wakatte Kurenai (single); Chuunin (album)	Defstar Records	Kenichi Maeyamada	Kenichi Maeyamada	Kenichi Maeyamada	Anime Rock Lee & His Ninja Pals ending theme song; produced by Kenichi Maeyamada; Oricon number 7 single
2012-09-05	Momoclo Tei Ichimon	"Nippon Egao Hyakkei" (ニッポン笑顔百景)	Nippon Egao Hyakkei (single)	King Records	Kenichi Maeyamada	Kenichi Maeyamada	Kenichi Maeyamada	Anime Joshiraku ending theme song; produced by Kenichi Maeyamada; Oricon number 6 single
2012-09-05	Morifu	"Morifu da yo! Zenin Shuugou" (もリフだョ! 全員集合)	Nippon Egao Hyakkei (single)	King Records	Kenichi Maeyamada	Kenichi Maeyamada	Kenichi Maeyamada	Made using various songs by The Drifters; produced by Kenichi Maeyamada
2012-09-05	Mikakunin Shoujotai UFI	"Betaa is the Best" (ベター is the Best)	Nippon Egao Hyakkei (single)	King Records	Kenichi Maeyamada	Kenichi Maeyamada	Kenichi Maeyamada	Show Unidentified Fantastic Idol ending theme; produced by Kenichi Maeyamada
2012-10-03	Band Ja Naimon!	"Pahipahi" (パヒパヒ)	Band ja Naimon! (album)	Warner Music Japan	Misako to Kacchan	Minami Tomoya	Kenichi Maeyamada	Vocal direction by Kenichi Maeyamada
2012-10-03	GUMI	"Parallel World" (パラレルワールド)	ELSWORD starring GUMI (album)	Toy's Factory	Kenichi Maeyamada	Kenichi Maeyamada	Kenichi Maeyamada	From a collaboration album with game Elsword
2012-10-10	Jealkb	"Hitomi Bana" (瞳･華)	V? (album)	Yoshimoto Music	Kenichi Maeyamada	Kenichi Maeyamada	Yoshiaki Fujisawa, Keisuke Kushino	—
2012-10-24	nao	"Kami Jigen! Fortune Material" (神次元! ふぉーちゅん・まてりある)	Kami Jigen! Fortune Material (single); Prismatic infinity carat. ii (album)	5pb.Records	nao	Kenichi Maeyamada	Kenichi Maeyamada	Game Hyperdimension Neptunia Victory opening theme song; Oricon number 34 single
2012-10-31	YuiKaori	"Wake Up!!" (ウェィカッ!!)	Wake Up!! (single); Bunny (album)	King Records	Kenichi Maeyamada	Kenichi Maeyamada	Kenichi Maeyamada	Show ANISONG Plus+ opening theme song for October 2012; produced by Kenichi Maeyamada; Oricon number 19 single
2012-12-05	Risa Yoshiki	"Sekai wa Kyoushitsu Dake Janai" (世界は教室だけじゃない)	Sekai wa Kyoushitsu Dake Janai (single); Pentomino (album)	Nippon Columbia	Kenichi Maeyamada	Kenichi Maeyamada	Yusuke Itagaki	Oricon number 40 single
2012-12-12	Terebi-chan	"Koukyou Denpa ni Nokatte" (公共電波にのっかって)	NHK Dai! Tensai Terebi-kun MTK the 17th (album)	Nippon Columbia	Kenichi Maeyamada, Dai! Tensai Terebi-kun Viewers	Kenichi Maeyamada	Kenichi Maeyamada	—
2012-12-21	Shiritsu Ebisu Chuugaku	"ebiture"	Ebichu no Zeppan Best ~Owaranai Seishun~ (album)	Defstar Records	Kenichi Maeyamada	Kenichi Maeyamada	Kenichi Maeyamada	Vocal direction by Kenichi Maeyamada
2012-12-21	Shiritsu Ebisu Chuugaku	"Ebichu Shusseki Bangou no Uta Sono 1" (エビ中出席番号の歌 その1)	Ebichu no Zeppan Best ~Owaranai Seishun~ (album)	Defstar Records	Kenichi Maeyamada	Kenichi Maeyamada	Kenichi Maeyamada	Vocal direction by Kenichi Maeyamada
2013-01-09	Misamisa	"Kaseifu? OK!" (家政婦? OK!)	Kaseifu? OK! (single)	TBS RADIO & COMMUNICATIONS, Inc	"Fumou na Giron" Listeners	Kenichi Maeyamada	Kenichi Maeyamada	—
2013-01-09	Yuzu	"REASON"	REASON (single); LAND (album)	SENHA&Co.	Yujin Kitagawa, Koji Iwasawa, Kenichi Maeyamada	Yujin Kitagawa, Koji Iwasawa, Kenichi Maeyamada	Kenichi Maeyamada, Yuzu	Anime Hunter × Hunter ending theme song; produced by Kenichi Maeyamada; Oricon number 3 single
2013-01-16	Shiritsu Ebisu Chuugaku	"Ume" (梅)	Ume (single); Chuunin (album)	Defstar Records	Kenichi Maeyamada	Kenichi Maeyamada	Kenichi Maeyamada	Produced by Kenichi Maeyamada; Nippon TV show PON! ending theme song; Oricon number 3 single
2013-01-16	Dempagumi.inc	"W.W.D"	W.W.D / Fuyu e to Hashiridasuo! (single); WORLD WIDE DEMPA (album)	Toy's Factory	Kenichi Maeyamada	Kenichi Maeyamada	Kenichi Maeyamada	Produced by Kenichi Maeyamada; Oricon number 10 single
2013-02-13	DISH//	"Give Me Chocolate!" (ギブミーチョコレート!)	Give Me Chocolate! / The Dish ~Tomaranai Seishun~ (single)	SDR	Kenichi Maeyamada	Kenichi Maeyamada	Kenichi Maeyamada	MXTV show CHOU × D opening theme song; Produced by Kenichi Maeyamada; Oricon number 17 single
2013-02-13	DISH//	"The Dish ~Tomaranai Seishun~" (ザ・ディッシュ～とまらない青春)	Give Me Chocolate! / The Dish ~Tomaranai Seishun~ (single)	SDR	Kenichi Maeyamada	Kenichi Maeyamada	Kenichi Maeyamada	Inspired by "The Tissue ~Tomaranai Seishun~" by Shiritsu Ebisu Chuugaku; produced by Kenichi Maeyamada
2013-02-20	Otome Shinto	"Mousou Koukan Nikki" (もうそう★こうかんにっき)	Mousou★Koukan Nikki (single); Otome Shinto Dai Ichi Maku ~Hajimari no Uta~ (album)	Fuwafuwa Records	Kenichi Maeyamada	Denkyuu	Denkyuu	Anime GJ Club opening theme song; Oricon number 37 single
2013-03-13	ROOT FIVE	"Break it Out!!"	ROOT FIVE (album)	Avex Trax	Kenichi Maeyamada	Kenichi Maeyamada	Kenichi Maeyamada	Produced by Kenichi Maeyamada
2013-03-13	9nine	"3three"	CUE (album)	SME Records	Kenichi Maeyamada	Kenichi Maeyamada	Kenichi Maeyamada	Produced by Kenichi Maeyamada
2013-03-27	Kis-My-Ft2	"Mother Moon"	Good Ikuze! (album)	Avex Trax	Kenichi Maeyamada	Kenichi Maeyamada	Masaya Suzuki	—
2013-03-31	Snack no Mama to Nagashi	"Anta" (アンタ)	Ebichu no Unit Album Seinenkan-ban (album)	Defstar Records	Kenichi Maeyamada	Kenichi Maeyamada	Kenichi Maeyamada	Duet song between Aika Hirota and Kenichi Maeyamada; produced by Kenichi Maeyamada
2013-03-31	Trio the Influenza	"Isshou Issho Iissho?" (一生一緒いいっしょ?)	Ebichu no Unit Album Seinenkan-ban (album)	Defstar Records	Kenichi Maeyamada	Kenichi Maeyamada	Kenichi Maeyamada	Produced by Kenichi Maeyamada
2013-03-31	Trio the Influenza	"Sorosoro Kuruzo" (そろそろくるぞ)	Ebichu no Unit Album Sunplaza-ban (album)	Defstar Records	Kenichi Maeyamada	Kenichi Maeyamada	Kenichi Maeyamada	—
2013-04-10	Momoiro Clover Z	"Hai to Diamond" (灰とダイヤモンド)	5th Dimension (album)	King Records	Natsumi Tadano	Kenichi Maeyamada	Kenji Kondo	—
2013-05-01	Yuzu	"Nagareboshi Kirari" (流れ星キラリ)	REASON (single); LAND (album)	SENHA&Co.	Yujin Kitagawa, Koji Iwasawa	Yujin Kitagawa	Kenichi Maeyamada, Yuzu	Anime Hunter × Hunter ending theme song
2013-06-12	DJ Yatsui Ichirou	"Tenketenketen" (てんけてんけてん)	Tenketenketen (single); YATSUI FESTIVAL (album)	Victor Entertainment	Kenichi Maeyamada	Kenichi Maeyamada	Kenichi Maeyamada	Produced by Kenichi Maeyamada
2013-06-19	Rurika Yokoyama	"Walk My Way"	Walk My Way (single); Lapis Lazuli (album)	Victor Entertainment	Kenichi Maeyamada	Kenichi Maeyamada	Yusuke Itagaki	First solo single released by a member of Idoling!!!; produced by Kenichi Maeyamada; Oricon number 12 single
2013-06-19	Rurika Yokoyama	"Eien ni Saku Hana" (永遠に咲く花)	Walk My Way (single)	Victor Entertainment	Kenichi Maeyamada	Kenichi Maeyamada	Yoshiaki Fujisawa	Produced by Kenichi Maeyamada
2013-07-10	Mayu Watanabe	"Cousin" (カズン)	Rappa Renshuuchuu (single)	Sony Music Records	Yasushi Akimoto	Kenichi Maeyamada	Kentaro Ishii	—
2013-07-24	Gero	"Udon" (うどん)	one (album)	NBCUniversal Entertainment Japan	Kenichi Maeyamada	Kenichi Maeyamada	Kenichi Maeyamada	Kenichi Maeyamada appears in the music video
2013-07-24	Mikako Komatsu	"LISTEN!!"	Owaranai Melody wo Utaidashimashita (single)	King Records	Kenichi Maeyamada	Kenichi Maeyamada	Kenichi Maeyamada	—
2013-07-24	Piko	"Kasa" (傘)	PIKOllection "BEST+4" (album)	Kioon Music	Kenichi Maeyamada	Kenichi Maeyamada	Kenichi Maeyamada	—
2013-09-11	Tomohisa Yamashita	"Parade" (パレード)	A NUDE (album)	Warner Music Japan	Kenichi Maeyamada	Nakajin (SEKAI NO OWARI)	Kenichi Maeyamada	—
2013-10-02	Dempagumi.inc	"W.W.D II"	W.W.D II (single); WORLD WIDE DEMPA (album)	Toy's Factory	Kenichi Maeyamada	Kenichi Maeyamada	Shunsuke Tsuri	Movie Shiromajo Gakuen theme song; sequel to "W.W.D"; Oricon number 8 single
2013-10-02	Dempagumi.inc	"Not Bocchi...Natsu" (ノットボッチ...夏)	W.W.D II (single)	Toy's Factory	NOBE, Mofukuchan, YGQ	Kousuke Noma	Kenichi Maeyamada	—
2013-10-06	Idol Yokai Kawayushi	"Kawayushi Arawaru" (カワユシ♥アラワル)	Kawayushi♥Arawaru (single)	Warner Music Japan	Kenichi Maeyamada	Kenichi Maeyamada	Kenichi Maeyamada, Masaaki Asada	TV Asahi show Music-ru TV ending theme song for November 2013; Oricon number 21 single
2013-10-09	Rurika Yokoyama	"Your Voice, My Life"	Your Voice, My Life (single); Lapis Lazuli (album)	Victor Entertainment	Kenichi Maeyamada	Kenichi Maeyamada	Yusuke Itagaki	Oricon number 9 single
2013-10-16	Kanjani8	"TAKOYAKI in my heart"	JUKE BOX (album)	Imperial Records	Kenichi Maeyamada	Kenichi Maeyamada	Shogo Ohnishi	—
2013-10-23	YuiKaori	"Kimi ga Sekai de Sekai wa Kimi de" (君が世界で世界は君で)	Bunny (album)	King Records	Aki Hata	Kenichi Maeyamada	Kenichi Maeyamada	—
2013-11-20	Shiritsu Ebisu Chuugaku	"I'm your MANAGER!!!"	Mikakunin Chuugakusei X (single)	Defstar Records	Kenichi Maeyamada, Twitter no minasan	Kenichi Maeyamada	Kenichi Maeyamada	Pokka Sapporo Gabunomi junior and high school student support song; lyrics crowdsourced from Twitter users
2013-12-04	DISH//	"Itsuka wa Merry Christmas" (いつかはメリークリスマス)	Itsuka wa Merry Christmas (single)	Sony Music Records	Kenichi Maeyamada	Kenichi Maeyamada	Kenichi Maeyamada	Sequel to DISH// song "Give Me Chocolate!"; produced by Kenichi Maeyamada; Oricon number 8 single
2013-12-11	Dempagumi.inc	"Hajimari. ~WORLD WIDE DEMPA~" (ハジマリ。〜WORLD WIDE DEMPA〜)	WORLD WIDE DEMPA (album)	Toy's Factory	—	Kenichi Maeyamada	Kenichi Maeyamada	—
2013-12-25	Yuzu	"Hyouri Ittai" (表裏一体)	Hyouri Ittai (single); Shinsekai (album)	SENHA&Co.	Yujin Kitagawa, Koji Iwasawa, Kenichi Maeyamada	Yujin Kitagawa, Koji Iwasawa, Kenichi Maeyamada	Kenichi Maeyamada, Yuzu	Anime film Hunter × Hunter: The Last Mission ending theme song; Oricon number 4 single
2014-01-29	Bakusute Sotokanda Icchome	"Douse Osarenai" (どうせ推されない)	① The Produce (album)	Warner Music Japan	Ryusei Bitou	Kenichi Maeyamada	Kentaro Ishii	—
2014-01-15	Fear, and Loathing in Las Vegas	"Chase the Light! (Hyadain no RiRiRiRi Remix)" (Chase the Light! (ヒャダインのリリリリ☆リミックス))	Rave-up Tonight (album)	Vap	Fear, and Loathing in Las Vegas	Fear, and Loathing in Las Vegas	Kenichi Maeyamada	—
2014-02-19	Yuzu	"Utopia" (ユートピア)	Shinsekai (album)	SENHA&Co.	Yujin Kitagawa	Yuzu	Kenichi Maeyamada, Yuzu	—
2014-03-19	Rurika Yokoyama	"Across The Sky"	Lapis Lazuli (album)	Victor Entertainment	Kenichi Maeyamada	Kenichi Maeyamada	Yusuke Itagaki	—
2014-03-19	Tacoyaki Rainbow	"Naniwa no Haniwa" (なにわのはにわ)	Naniwa no Haniwa (single)	SDR	Kenichi Maeyamada	Kenichi Maeyamada	Kenichi Maeyamada	—
2014-04-09	SMAP	"Silence"	Yes we are / Koko Kara (single)	Victor Entertainment	Kenichi Maeyamada	Kenichi Maeyamada	Masaaki Asada	—
2014-04-09	SMAP	"Koko Kara ~Hyadain no RiRiRiRi Remix~" (ココカラ 〜ヒャダインのリリリリ☆リミックス〜)	Yes we are / Koko Kara (single)	Victor Entertainment	Sho Wada	Sho Wada	Kenichi Maeyamada	—
2014-04-16	Kerakera	"MAKE UP"	Kerakerariat (album)	Universal Music	Mori-san, Furuppe	Furuppe	Kenichi Maeyamada	—
2014-04-16	Nana Mizuki	"Million Ways=One Destination"	SUPERNAL LIBERTY (album)	King Records	Kenichi Maeyamada	Kenichi Maeyamada, Kenji Ito	Kenji Ito	Smartphone game Kaku-San-Sei Million Arthur theme song
2014-05-21	Chikasugi Princess	"Moonlight Labyrinth" (ムーンライト・ラビリンス)	Moonlight Labyrinth (single); Chika Yori Ai wo Komete (album)	Pony Canyon	Morisama (DLE), ma-saya	Kenichi Maeyamada	Kenichi Maeyamada	Anime Chikasugi Idol Akae-chan character song
2014-05-21	Gero	"Wagahai wa Osuneko de aru" (吾輩はオス猫である)	Wagahai wa Osuneko de aru (single); SECOND (album)	NBCUniversal Entertainment Japan	Kenichi Maeyamada	Kenichi Maeyamada	Kenichi Maeyamada	Kenichi Maeyamada appears in the music video; Oricon number 33 single
2014-05-21	Hiromi Go	"99 wa Owaranai" (99は終わらない)	99 wa Owaranai (single)	Sony Music Records	Kenichi Maeyamada	Kenichi Maeyamada	Kenichi Maeyamada	Hiromi Go's 99th single; Oricon number 23 single
2014-05-27	Ringo Sheena	"Private" (プライベイト)	Gyakuyunyuu ~Kouwankyoku~ (album)	Universal Music	Ringo Sheena	Ringo Sheena	Kenichi Maeyamada	Self cover; originally performed by Ryoko Hirosue
2014-06-25	Sphere	"Ding! Dong! Ding! Dong!"	4 colors for you (album)	Lantis	Kenichi Maeyamada	Kenichi Maeyamada	Kenichi Maeyamada	—
2014-07-02	China Hizuki	"Suppin de Combini" (すっぴんでコンビニ)	Suppin de Combini (single)	Lawson HMV Entertainment	China Hizuki	China Hizuki	Kenichi Maeyamada	Reward for winning a LAWSON contest; produced by Kenichi Maeyamada
2014-07-03	Gummibär	"I Am A Gummy Bear (The Gummy Bear Song)" (ぼくはグミベア)	おやつ いいやつ すごいやつ (single)	Avex Trax	Christian Philipp Schneider	Christian André Schneider	Christian André Schneider	—
2014-07-09	Gospellers	"SING!!!!!"	SING!!!!! (single); The Gospellers Now (album)	Kioon Music	Kenichi Maeyamada	Kenichi Maeyamada	Kenichi Maeyamada	20th anniversary celebration song; Kenichi Maeyamada appears in the music video; produced by Kenichi Maeyamada
2014-07-09	Underbar	"Magician's Summer" (まじしゃんず☆さまー)	qawsedrftgyhujikolplp;@: "Doumo __ (Underbar) desu." (Kari) (album)	Subcul-rise Record	Underbar	Kenichi Maeyamada	Suzumu	—
2014-07-16	D-LITE	"Look at me, Gwisun" (ナルバキスン)	D'slove (album)	YGEX	G-Dragon, Kenichi Maeyamada	G-Dragon, KUSH	G-Dragon	Japanese version of Daesung's first single
2014-07-18	Dempagumi.inc	"Rokuro KISS" (ろくろKISS)	—	—	Bakarhythm	Kenichi Maeyamada	Kenichi Maeyamada	Originates from a skit done by Dempagumi.inc on Bangumi Bakarhythm 2
2014-07-18	Yuzu (Junko Kitamigawa & Mucho Koiwasawa)	"Yogiri no Isezakichou ~Ai no Shinsekaihen~" (夜霧の伊勢佐木町〜愛の真世界編〜)	Yogiri no Isezakichou ~Ai no Shinsekaihen~ (single); Shinsekai (album)	SENHA&Co.	Yujin Kitagawa	Yujin Kitagawa	Kenichi Maeyamada, Yuzu	—
2014-07-23	Announcer Danshi Sanninshu	"Oretachi no Pride" (俺達の、理不尽（プライド))	Oretachi no Pride (single)	CJ Victor Entertainment	Kenichi Maeyamada	Kenichi Maeyamada	Kenichi Maeyamada	Special group formed for Nippon TV program Sukkiri! consisting of Keisuke Mori, Daisuke Fujita, and Genta Aoki; produced by Kenichi Maeyamada
2014-07-30	Dempagumi.inc	"Chururi Chururira" (ちゅるりちゅるりら)	Chururi Chururira (single); WWDD (album)	Toy's Factory	Kenichi Maeyamada	Kenichi Maeyamada	Shunsuke Tsuri	CM song for Nissin Cup Noodles; produced by Kenichi Maeyamada; Oricon number 10 single
2014-08-13	mimimemeMIMI	"Oekaki" (お絵描き)	Meikyuu Sentimental (album)	A-Sketch	Yuka (mimimemeMIMI)	Yuka (mimimemeMIMI)	Kenichi Maeyamada	Smartphone game School Fanfare image song
2014-08-13	Yui Ogura	"thx!!"	Tinkling Smile (single)	King Records	Kenichi Maeyamada	CHI-MEY	Yoshihiro Saito	Anime Encouragement of Climb ending theme song
2014-08-20	Nagareda Project	"Vampire Gakuen CHU-WA" (ヴァンパイヤ学園☆CHU-WA)	Realize! (album)	Nippon Columbia	Aki Hata	Kenichi Maeyamada	Nagareda Project	—
2014-08-27	Bakusute Sotokanda Icchome	"Harinezumi to Jelly Bean" (ハリネズミとジェリービー)	Seishun Chronicle / Harinezumi to Jelly Bean (single); BEST The Bakusute Sotokanda Icchome ~5-nen ga Gyutto SP~ (album)	Warner Music Japan	Chiyomaru Shikura	Kenichi Maeyamada	Kentaro Ishii	Oricon number 10 single
2014-08-31	@JAM ALLSTARS 2014	"Yume no Suna ~a theme of @JAM~" (夢の砂 〜a theme of @JAM〜)	Yume no Suna ~a theme of @JAM~ (single)	Zepp Live Entertainment	Kenichi Maeyamada	Kenichi Maeyamada	Kenichi Maeyamada	Yearly unit song for JAM EXPO
2014-09-03	Tacoyaki Rainbow	"Zesshou! Naniwa de Umareta Shoujotachi" (絶唱!なにわで生まれた少女たち)	Zesshou! Naniwa de Umareta Shoujotachi (single)	SDR	Kenichi Maeyamada	Kenichi Maeyamada	Kenichi Maeyamada	—
2014-09-24	Kemio	"Wakamonotachi" (若者たち)	Wakamonotachi (single)	Universal Sigma	Toshio Fujita	Masaru Sato	Kenichi Maeyamada	Originally performed by The Broadside Four
2014-10-22	Akamaru Dash☆	"Akamaru Kyuujoushou Dash!!!!" (赤マル 急上昇ダッシュ!!!!)	Tabete, Waratte, Ikite Iku. (single)	Nippon Columbia	Kenichi Maeyamada	Kenichi Maeyamada	Kenichi Maeyamada	Entrance song for Hiroshima Toyo Carp's Yoshihiro Maru
2014-10-22	Wataru Hatano	"I'm a Voice Actor"	W (album)	Dive II Entertainment	Kenichi Maeyamada	Kenichi Maeyamada	Kenichi Maeyamada	—
2014-10-29	D-LITE	"A Big Hit!" (テバギヤ)	Delight	YGEX	G-Dragon, Kenichi Maeyamada	G-Dragon	G-Dragon	Japanese version of Daesung's second single
2014-11-05	Kanjani8	"Misoji Shounen" (三十路少年)	Kanjanism (album)	Infinity Records	Kenichi Maeyamada	Kenichi Maeyamada	Shogo Ohnishi	Sequel to "TAKOYAKI in my heart" from JUKE BOX
2014-12-10	S★Spicy	"DUST in STARDUST"	SGC★Spicy (single)	SDR	Kenichi Maeyamada	Masaaki Asada	Masaaki Asada	—
2014-12-17	Akai Ko-en	"Zettaiteki na Kankei (Hyadain no RiRiRiRi Remix)" (絶対的な関係 (ヒャダインのリリリリ☆リミックス))	Viva Great Hunting! 15th Anniversary (album)	Universal Music LLC	Maisa Tsuno	Maisa Tsuno	Kenichi Maeyamada	
2014-12-24	Nagi Yanagi	"Burn Out the ENERGY"	Sweet Track (single)	NBCUniversal Entertainment Japan	Kenichi Maeyamada.	Kenichi Maeyamada	Yoshihiro Saito	Mobile game selector battle with WIXOSS theme song
2015-01-14	DISH//	"We Are DISH//"	MAIN DISH (album)	Sony Music Records	Kenichi Maeyamada	Kenichi Maeyamada	Kenichi Maeyamada, JackPotBeats	—
2015-01-28	Shiritsu Ebisu Chuugaku	"Kinpachi DANCE MUSIC" (金八DANCE MUSIC)	Kinpachi (album)	Defstar Records	Kenichi Maeyamada	Kenichi Maeyamada	Satsuki ga Tenkomori	—
2015-03-11	Aika Hirota (Shiritsu Ebisu Chuugaku)	"aiai to Iku Nihon Zenkoku Tetsudou no Tabi" (ぁぃぁぃと行く日本全国鉄道の旅)	Ebichu no Unit Album Saitama Super Arena	Defstar Records	Kenichi Maeyamada	Kenichi Maeyamada	Kenichi Maeyamada	—
2015-04-15	Yuzu	"OLA!!"	OLA!! (single); TOWA (album)	SENHA&Co.	Yujin Kitagawa	Yujin Kitagawa	Kenichi Maeyamada, Yujin Kitagawa	Anime Crayon Shin-chan: My Moving Story! Cactus Large Attack! ending theme song; Kenichi Maeyamada appears in the music video; produced by Kenichi Maeyamada; Oricon number 6 single
2015-04-29	D-51	"4.9cm" (4.9センチ)	Sing a song ~Present for...~ (album)	Tokuma Japan Communications	Kenichi Maeyamada	Kenichi Maeyamada	Takayuki Ota	—
2015-04-29	Shokotan♥Dempagumi	"PUNCH LINE!"	PUNCH LINE! (single)	Sony Music Records	Kenichi Maeyamada	Kenichi Maeyamada	Kenichi Maeyamada	Anime Punch Line opening theme song; Oricon number 13 single
2015-05-20	Tacoyaki Rainbow	"Genki Uri no Shoujo ~Naniwa Meika Gojussen~" (元気売りの少女〜浪花名歌五十選〜)	Genki Uri no Shoujo ~Naniwa Meika Gojussen~ (single)	SDR	Kenichi Maeyamada	Kenichi Maeyamada	Kenichi Maeyamada	Nippon TV show PON! ending theme song; Oricon number 8 single
2015-05-27	Gero	"You Can Do It ~Yume wo Oikakete~" (You Can Do It 〜夢を追いかけて〜)	The Bandits (album)	NBCUniversal Entertainment Japan	Kenichi Maeyamada	Kenichi Maeyamada	Yoshihiro Saito	Movie Outer Man ending theme song
2015-06-10	Bullet Train	"Battaman" (バッタマン)	Stardust Love Train / Battaman (single)	SDR	Kenichi Maeyamada	Kenichi Maeyamada	Jockie "MASTA BASS" Suama	Kenichi Maeyamada appears in the music video; produced by Kenichi Maeyamada; Oricon number 5 single
2015-06-17	Dempagumi.inc	"Otsukare Summer!" (おつかれサマー!)	Otsukare Summer! (single); GOGO DEMPA (album)	Toy's Factory	Yujin Kitagawa, Kenichi Maeyamada	Yujin Kitagawa, Kenichi Maeyamada	Tom-H@ck	CM song for Yamazaki Baking; Oricon number 3 single
2015-06-17	Dempagumi♥Shokotan	"Zoku・PUNCH LINE!" (続・PUNCH LINE!)	Otsukare Summer! (single)	SDR	Kenichi Maeyamada	Kenichi Maeyamada	Yoshihiro Saito	Alternate version of anime Punch Line opening theme song
2015-06-24	Yohdi Kondo	"30th CENTURY BOY"	402 (album)	Avex Trax	Show Ayanocozey	Kenichi Maeyamada	KAY	—
2015-07-22	MAX	"#SELFIE ~ONNA Now~"	#SELFIE ~ONNA Now~ (single); MAXIMUM PERFECT BEST (album)	SONIC GROOVE	Andrew Taggart, Kenichi Maeyamada	Andrew Taggart, Kenichi Maeyamada	Tomoharu Moriya (WORLD SKETCH)	Rewritten cover of "#SELFIE" by The Chainsmokers; 20th anniversary single; Fuji TV show Uchi kuru!? ending theme song; Oricon number 40 single
2015-07-29	Dempagumi.inc	"Supercalifragilisticexpialidocious" (スーパーカリフラジリスティックエクスピアリドーシャス)	ROCK IN DISNEY (album)	Walt Disney Records	Richard M. Sherman, Robert B. Sherman	Richard M. Sherman, Robert B. Sherman	Kenichi Maeyamada	Cover of "Supercalifragilisticexpialidocious" from Mary Poppins
2015-08-12	Yuzu	"Owaranai Uta" (終わらない歌)	Owaranai Uta (single); TOWA (album)	SENHA&Co.	Yujin Kitagawa, Kenichi Maeyamada	Yujin Kitagawa, Kenichi Maeyamada	Yujin Kitagawa, Kenichi Maeyamada	Fuji TV show Mezamashi TV 2015 theme song; sound produced by Kenichi Maeyamada
2015-09-09	LinQ	"LinQuest ~Yagate Densetsu e..." (LinQuest 〜やがて伝説へ...)	LinQuest ~Yagate Densetsu e... (single); FRONTIER ~LinQ Dai San Gakushou~ (album)	Warner Music Japan	Kenichi Maeyamada	Kenichi Maeyamada	Shunsuke Tsuri	Produced by Kenichi Maeyamada; Oricon number 8 single
2015-09-09	Milky Holmes	"Milky 100 World" (ミルキィ100ワールド)	Milky 100 World (single); Milky Holmes 2nd Album "Soutennenshoku" (album)	Bushiroad Music	Saori Kodama	Kenichi Maeyamada	Kenichi Maeyamada	Anime Future Card Buddyfight Hundred ending theme; sound produced by Kenichi Maeyamada; Oricon number 28 single
2015-09-16	Dempagumi.inc	"Tonchin Kanchin Ikkyuu-san" (とんちんかんちん一休さん)	Ashita Chikyuu ga Konagona ni Natte mo (single)	Toy's Factory	Morihisa Yamamoto	Seiichi Uno	Kenichi Maeyamada	Cover of Ikkyuusan anime opening theme song
2015-10-14	Nagareboshi	"Gifu Me Chance" (岐阜ミーチャンス)	Gifu Me Chance (single)	Pony Canyon	Nagareboshi	Kenichi Maeyamada	Kenichi Maeyamada	Sound produced by Kenichi Maeyamada; Oricon number 44 single
2015-10-28	Shokotan♥Sacchan	"Mugen Blanc Noir" (無限∞ブランノワール)	Mugen Blanc Noir (single); RGB ~True Color~ (album)	Sony Music Records	Kenichi Maeyamada	Kenichi Maeyamada	Kenichi Maeyamada	Square Enix game Mugen Knights collaboration song; anime Omakase! Miracle Cat-dan opening theme song; produced by Kenichi Maeyamada; Oricon number 12 single
2015-11-03	Niji no Conquistador	"Onna no Ko Muteki Sengen!" (女の子むてき宣言!)	Rainbow Spectrum (album)	FUJIYAMA PROJECT JAPAN	Kenichi Maeyamada	Kenichi Maeyamada	Kenichi Maeyamada	—
2015-11-04	Daisuke Ono	"Canvas"	Hero (album)	Lantis	Kenichi Maeyamada	Kenichi Maeyamada	Kenichi Maeyamada	—
2015-11-18	Hiroko Moriguchi	"Hoshi Yori Saki ni Mitsukete Ageru" (星より先に見つけてあげる)	Hoshi Yori Saki ni Mitsukete Ageru (single)	Lantis	Aki Hata	Kenichi Maeyamada	Kenichi Maeyamada	Anime One-Punch Man ending theme song
2015-11-18	PUFFY	"Puffy Pipo Yama" (パフィピポ山)	Puffy Pipo Yama (single); THE PUFFY (album)	Warner Music Japan	Kenichi Maeyamada	PandaBoY	Takashi Asano	—
2015-12-16	Milcs	"Tonchin Kanchin Ikkyuu-san" (とんちんかんちん一休さん)	Mahou Tsukai Sally / Tonchin Kanchin Ikkyuu-san (single)	Idolmatsuri	Morihisa Yamamoto	Seiichi Uno	Kenichi Maeyamada	Cover of Ikkyuusan anime opening theme song
2015-12-16	Tacoyaki Rainbow	"Namba de Samba 2" (ナンバでサンバ2)	Kuribocchi ONE DAY!! (single)	SDR	Kenichi Maeyamada	Kenichi Maeyamada	Kenichi Maeyamada	—
2015-12-21	IDOL SCHOOL	"Happy Happy New Year Yeah"	Happy Happy New Year Yeah (single); Back You Up (album)	—	Qian Lin	Qian Lin	Kenichi Maeyamada	—
2015-12-22	IDOL SCHOOL	"La La La La Sheng Dan Kuai Le O" (啦啦啦圣诞快乐耶)	La La La La Sheng Dan Kuai Le O (single); Back You Up (album)	—	Qian Lin	Qian Lin	Kenichi Maeyamada	—
2015-12-26	Rurika Yokoyama	"SHUT YOUR MOUTH!!!!!!"	SHUT YOUR MOUTH!!!!!! (single); Michishirube (album)	CJ Victor Entertainment	Kenichi Maeyamada	Kenichi Maeyamada	Initial Talk	Nippon TV show PON! ending theme song; Produced by Kenichi Maeyamada; Oricon number 19 single
2016-01-05	Rev. from DVL	"Okujou no Sukima Shiroi Sora" (屋上のスキマ 白いソラ)	Okujou no Sukima Shiroi Sora (single); NEVER SAY GOODBYE -arigatou- (album)	YM3D; DISCOVERY NEXT Records	Kenichi Maeyamada	Kenichi Maeyamada	Mitsuru	Produced by Kenichi Maeyamada; Oricon number 5 single
2016-01-08	Dempagumi.inc	"Ba! To The Future" (破 ! to the Future)	Ba! To The Future (single); GOGO DEMPA (album)	Toy's Factory	Kenichi Maeyamada	Tom-H@ck	Tom-H@ck	—
2016-01-10	every♥︎ing!	"Nyanko is LOVE!" (にゃんこ is L♥︎VE!)	Nyanko is L♥︎VE! (single)	King Records	Kenichi Maeyamada	Kenichi Maeyamada	Kenichi Maeyamada	Anime Nyanko Days ending theme song; alternate version of "What is LOVE?"
2016-01-13	Riho Iida	"KISS! KISS! KISS!"	KISS! KISS! KISS! (single) rippi-holic (album)	Tokuma Japan Communications	Kenichi Maeyamada	Kenichi Maeyamada	Kenichi Maeyamada	Also has a Chinese version; Nippon TV show Buzz Rhythm ending theme song; Oricon number 3 single
2016-02-17	Kobushi Factory	"Chotto Guchoku ni! Chototsu Moushin" (チョット愚直に!猪突猛進)	Sakura Night Fever / Chotto Guchoku ni! Chototsu Moushin / Osu! Kobushi Tamashii (single); Kobushi Sono Ichi (album)	Zetima	Kenichi Maeyamada	Kenichi Maeyamada	Shunsuke Suzuki	Oricon number 1 single
2016-02-17	Momoiro Clover Z	"Buryoutougen Nakayoshi Monogatari" (武陵桃源なかよし物語)	Amaranthus (album)	King Records	Kenichi Maeyamada	Kenichi Maeyamada	Yukari Hashimoto	—
2016-02-17	Momoiro Clover Z	"Ai wo Tsugumono" (愛を継ぐもの)	Hakkin no Yoake (album)	King Records	Kenichi Maeyamada	Kenichi Maeyamada	Tom-H@ck	—
2016-03-02	Hayabusa	"Evorevo!" (エボレボ！)	Evorevo! (single); Hayabusa First (album)	Victor Entertainment	Kenichi Maeyamada	Kenichi Maeyamada	Kenichi Maeyamada	Anime Duel Masters VSR and Duel Masters VSRF opening theme song; sound produced by Kenichi Maeyamada; Oricon number 18 single
2016-03-09	SUPER GiRLS	"Clam Chowder ga Samechau Getsuyoubi" (クラムチャウダーが冷めちゃう月曜日)	SUPER CASTLE (album)	iDOL Street	Kenichi Maeyamada	Kenichi Maeyamada	Kenichi Maeyamada	—
2016-03-16	IDOL SCHOOL	"Wo De Shijie Wo Zhidao Ni Bu Dong, Hao, Qie Bieguan Wo" (我的世界我知道你不懂，好，请别管我)	Ting Ni	—	Qian Lin	Qian Lin	Kenichi Maeyamada	—
2016-03-16	Milcs Honmono	"Kita no Kuni Kara Ai wo Komete" (北の国から愛を込めて)	Kita no Kuni Kara Ai wo Komete (single)	Idolmatsuri Label	Show Ayanocozey	Kenichi Maeyamada	Kenichi Maeyamada	Oricon number 31 single
2016-04-06	PUFFY	"Dakitakya Dakeba E Ja NIGHT" (抱きたきゃ抱けばEじゃNIGHT☆)	20th ANNIVERSARY BEST ALBUM Hi Datsuryoku Ha Sengen (album)	Warner Music Japan	KuboMineHyada (Mitsurou Kubo, Mineko Nomachi, Kenichi Maeyamada)	Kenichi Maeyamada	Kenichi Maeyamada	Written during an episode of KuboMineHyada that PUFFY made an appearance on
2016-04-06	Rio Hiiragi	"BANZAI! BANZAI!"	BANZAI! BANZAI! (single)	IVY Records	Kenichi Maeyamada	Kenichi Maeyamada	Kenichi Maeyamada	Featured in BBC Storyville documentary Tokyo Idols; sound produced by Kenichi Maeyamada; Oricon number 14 single
2016-04-20	Milky Holmes	"Soutennenshoku Full Power!" (総天然色フルパワー！)	Milky Holmes 2nd Album "Soutennenshoku"	Bushiroad Music	Saori Kodama	Kenichi Maeyamada	Keita Miyoshi	Song for anime Tantei Opera Milky Holmes
2016-04-20	Shiritsu Ebisu Chuugaku	"Ebichu Shusseki Bangou no Uta Sono 2" (エビ中出席番号の歌 その2)	Anarchy (album)	SME Records	Kenichi Maeyamada	Kenichi Maeyamada	Kenichi Maeyamada	Updated version of "Ebichu Shusseki Bangou no Uta Sono 1"
2016-04-20	Shiritsu Ebisu Chuugaku	"Sanmaime no Tough Gaki" (参枚目のタフガキ)	Anarchy (album)	SME Records	Kenichi Maeyamada	Kenichi Maeyamada	CMJK	—
2016-05-11	Little Glee Monster	"JOY"	My Best Friend (single); Joyful Monster (album)	Sony Music Records	Kenichi Maeyamada	Kenichi Maeyamada	Takayuki Ota	Produced by Kenichi Maeyamada
2016-05-25	Hayabusa	"Rifujinjin" (りふじんじん)	Hayabusa First (album)	Victor Entertainment	Kenichi Maeyamada	Kenichi Maeyamada	Kenichi Maeyamada	Appeared on NHK TV show Minna no Uta both April and May 2016
2016-05-25u	UNKNOWN NUMBER!!!	"Kibou no Hikari" (キボウノヒカリ)	Kibou no Hikari (single)	Marvelous	Kenichi Maeyamada	Kenichi Maeyamada	Yoshihiro Saito	Anime Yu-Gi-Oh! Arc-V opening theme song; Oricon number 32 single
2016-05-25	UNKNOWN NUMBER!!!	"beatdown"	Kibou no Hikari (single)	Marvelous	Kenichi Maeyamada	Kenichi Maeyamada	Yoshihiro Saito	—
2016-06-06	IDOL SCHOOL	"Biye Ge" (毕业歌)	Biye Ge (single)	—	Qian Lin	Qian Lin	Kenichi Maeyamada	—
2016-06-08	Kikenbi Challenge Girls! Feat. Negicco	"Junjou Ecstasy" (純情エクスタシィ)	YATSUI MATOME ~SELECTION~	Victor Entertainment	Elekata no Conte Tarou listeners, Elekata, Kenichi Maeyamada	Kenichi Maeyamada	Yasushi Watanabe	—
2016-06-22	Natsu no Mamono	"Mamono, BOM-BA-YE ~Tamashii no Kakusei Hen~" (魔物、BOM-BA-YE ～魂ノ覚醒編～)	Mamono, BOM-BA-YE ~Tamashii no Kakusei Hen~ / Bye Bye Train (single); Natsu no Mamono (album)	Pony Canyon	Natsumi Tadano	Kenichi Maeyamada	Kenichi Maeyamada	Oricon number 32 single
2016-06-22	Toshiya Miyata (Kis-My-Ft2)	"Otaku Dattatte It's Alright!" (ヲタクだったってIt's Alright!)	I SCREAM (album)	Avex Trax	Kenichi Maeyamada	Kenichi Maeyamada	Hiroshi Usami	—
2016-07-06	Rock A Japonica	"Abracadabra Algebra" (アブラカタブラ アルジェブラ)	Kyouka SHOCK! (single); Magical View (album)	King Records	Kenichi Maeyamada	Kenichi Maeyamada	Kenichi Maeyamada	—
2016-08-22	Ringo Sheena	"Jiyu-Dom (Hyadain no RiRiRiRi Remix)" (ジユーダム (ヒャダインのリリリリ☆リミックス))	Jiyu-Dom (album)	EMI Records	Ringo Sheena	Ringo Sheena	Kenichi Maeyamada	—
2016-08-24	Tacoyaki Rainbow	"Dot jp Japan!" (どっとjpジャパーン!)	Dot jp Japan! (single); Maido! Ookini! (album)	Avex Trax	Kenichi Maeyamada	Kenichi Maeyamada	Wild Animals	TV Asahi show Music-ru TV ending theme song; Oricon number 10 single
2016-08-24	Tacoyaki Rainbow	"MBS ~Kazoku no Uta~" (MBS 〜家族の歌〜)	Dot jp Japan! (single)	Avex Trax	Kenichi Maeyamada	Kenichi Maeyamada	h-wonder	—
2016-09-07	Momoiro Clover Z	"Hanabi"	The Golden History (single)	King Records	Yuho Iwasato	Kenichi Maeyamada	Rui Nagai	—
2016-09-07	Natsu no Mamono	"Mirai wa Bokura no Kaze ga Fuku" (未来は僕等の風が吹く)	Natsu no Mamono (album)	Pony Canyon	Kenichi Maeyamada	Kenichi Maeyamada	Kenichi Maeyamada	—
2016-09-07	Suzuko Mimori	"FUTURE IS MINE"	Toyful Basket (album)	Pony Canyon	Kenichi Maeyamada	Kenichi Maeyamada	Kenichi Maeyamada	Nippon TV show PON! ending theme song for August 2016
2016-09-21	Babyraids JAPAN	"Ride On IDOROCK"	Nippon Chu!Chu!Chu! (album)	Pony Canyon	Kenichi Maeyamada	Kenichi Maeyamada	Mitsuru	—
2016-09-28	Ayaka Sasaki	"Aarin wa Aarin" (あーりんはあーりん♡)	Aarin wa Aarin♡ (single); A-rin Assort (album)	King Records	Kenichi Maeyamada	Kenichi Maeyamada	Kenichi Maeyamada	—
2016-10-12	Minami Takahashi	"Katsudon in da house" (カツ丼 in da house)	Aishitemo Ii Desu ka (album)	Universal Music	Kenichi Maeyamada	Kenichi Maeyamada	Kenichi Maeyamada	Contains guest vocals from Kenichi Maeyamada
2016-10-26	Bullet Train	"Battaman (Lunatic ver.)" (バッタマン Lunatic ver.)	Dramatic Seven (album)	SDR	Kenichi Maeyamada	Kenichi Maeyamada	Jockie "MASTA BASS" Suama	—
2016-10-26	Juice=Juice	"KEEP ON Joushou Shikou!!" (KEEP ON 上昇志向!!)	Dream Road ~Kokoro ga Odoridashiteru~ / KEEP ON Joshou Shikou!! / Ashita Yarou wa Bakayarou (single); Juice=Juice#2 -¡Una más!- (album)	Hachama	Kenichi Maeyamada	Kenichi Maeyamada	DANCE MAN	Oricon number 5 single
2016-11-12	Dempagumi.inc	"Suki Suki Song" (すきすきソング)	Sai Ψ Saikouchou! (single)	Toy's Factory	Morihisa Yamamoto, Hisashi Inoue	Asei Kobayashi	Kenichi Maeyamada	Originally performed by Ado Mizumori for anime Himitsu no Akko-chan
2016-11-16	Shiritsu Ebisu Chuugaku	"I'm your MANAGER!!!(Chuukara ver.)" (I'm your MANAGER!!! (中辛 ver.))	「Chuukara」 ~Ebichu no Wakuwaku Best~ (album)	SME Records	Kenichi Maeyamada, Twitter no Minasan	Kenichi Maeyamada	Kenichi Maeyamada	—
2016-11-16	Shiritsu Ebisu Chuugaku	"Houkago Getabako Rock 'n' Roll MX (Chuuotsu ver.)" (放課後ゲタ箱ロッケンロールMX (中卒ver.))	「Chuuotsu」 ~Ebichu no Ikeike Best~ (album)	SME Records	Kenichi Maeyamada	Kenichi Maeyamada	Kenichi Maeyamada	Direction by Kenichi Maeyamada
2016-11-16	Shiritsu Ebisu Chuugaku	"Go! Go! Here We Go! Rock Lee! (Chuuotsu ver.)" (Go!Go!Here We Go!ロック・リー (中卒ver.))	「Chuuotsu」 ~Ebichu no Ikeike Best~ (album)	SME Records	Kenichi Maeyamada	Kenichi Maeyamada	Kenichi Maeyamada	—
2016-11-16	Shiritsu Ebisu Chuugaku	"Ume (Chuuotsu ver.)" (梅 (中卒ver.))	「Chuuotsu」 ~Ebichu no Ikeike Best~ (album)	SME Records	Kenichi Maeyamada	Kenichi Maeyamada	Kenichi Maeyamada	—
2016-12-21	Dempagumi.inc	"WWDBEST"	WWDBEST ~Denpa Ryoukou!~ (album)	Toy's Factory	Kenichi Maeyamada, Aki Hata, meg rock, Kaseki Cider, Natsumi Tadano, NOBE	Tamaya 2060%, Takashi Asano, Shunsuke Tsuri, Tom-H@ck, Masaya Koike	Tom-H@ck	Co-written by 11 people who have worked on Dempagumi.inc songs in the past
2016-12-21	Tacoyaki Rainbow	"Arigatou Tacoyaki Rainbow Desu" (ありがとう たこやきレインボーです)	Maido! Ookini! (album)	Avex Trax	Kenichi Maeyamada	Kida Tarou	Koharu (CHARAN-PO-RANTAN)	Produced by Kenichi Maeyamada
2016-12-21	Tacoyaki Rainbow	"Chichinpuipuipui" (ちちんぷいぷいぷい)	Maido! Ookini! (album)	Avex Trax	Kenichi Maeyamada	Kenichi Maeyamada, 大熊猫酸太夫	大熊猫酸太夫	Co-composed and arranged by DJ JET BARON (who bought funkot to Japan) under an alias; Produced by Kenichi Maeyamada
2016-12-21	Tacoyaki Rainbow	"Amagasaki Techno" (尼崎テクノ)	Maido! Ookini! (album)	Avex Trax	Kenichi Maeyamada	Kenichi Maeyamada	CMJK	Produced by Kenichi Maeyamada
2016-12-21	Tacoyaki Rainbow	"Koisuru Billiken-san" (恋するビリケンさん)	Maido! Ookini! (album)	Avex Trax	Kenichi Maeyamada	Kenichi Maeyamada	CMJK	Produced by Kenichi Maeyamada
2016-12-21	Tacoyaki Rainbow	"overture ~tacoture~"	Maido! Ookini! (album)	Avex Trax	—	Kenichi Maeyamada	—	Produced by Kenichi Maeyamada
2016-12-21	Tacoyaki Rainbow	"Namba Samba Ija" (ナンバサンバイジャー)	Maido! Ookini! (album)	Avex Trax	Kenichi Maeyamada	Kenichi Maeyamada	Kenichi Maeyamada	Produced by Kenichi Maeyamada
2016-12-21	Tacoyaki Rainbow	"Naniwa no Haniwa (2016 Remaster)" (なにわのはにわ (2016 Remaster))	Maido! Ookini! (album)	Avex Trax	Kenichi Maeyamada	Kenichi Maeyamada	Kenichi Maeyamada	Produced by Kenichi Maeyamada
2016-12-21	Tacoyaki Rainbow	"Zesshou! Naniwa de Umareta Shoujotachi (2016 Remaster)" (絶唱！なにわで生まれた少女たち (2016 Remaster))	Maido! Ookini! (album)	Avex Trax	Kenichi Maeyamada	Kenichi Maeyamada	Kenichi Maeyamada	Produced by Kenichi Maeyamada
2016-12-21	Tacoyaki Rainbow	"Genki Uri no Shoujo ~Naniwa Meika Gojussen (2016 Remaster)" (元気売りの少女～浪花名歌五十選～ (2016 Remaster))	Maido! Ookini! (album)	Avex Trax	Kenichi Maeyamada	Kenichi Maeyamada	Kenichi Maeyamada	Produced by Kenichi Maeyamada
2016-12-23	Momoiro Clover Z	"Mafuyu no Sun Sun Summertime" (真冬のサンサンサマータイム)	MCZ WINTER SONG COLLECTION (album)	King Records	Kenichi Maeyamada	Kenichi Maeyamada	Tomoki Hasegawa	—
2017-01-09	Niji no Conquistador	"Retort ~Kareinaru Ai~" (レトルト～華麗なる愛～)	Retort ~Kareinaru Ai~ (single); Rainbow Phenomenon (album)	King Records	Kenji Ohtsuki	Kenichi Maeyamada	Takashi Asano	Collaboration song with Caligari Curry; Kenichi Maeyamada appears in the music video
2017-01-18	every♥ing!	"What is LOVE?"	Colorful Shining Dream First Date♥ (album)	King Records	Kenichi Maeyamada	Kenichi Maeyamada	Kenichi Maeyamada	—
2017-02-15	LiSA	"Merry Hurry Berry"	Catch the Moment (single)	Aniplex	Shin Furuya	Kenichi Maeyamada	Tom-H@ck	—
2017-02-22	Inai Inai Baa!	"Hoppeppo!" (ほっぺっぽ!)	NHK Inai Inai Baa! Kanpaai! (album)	Nippon Columbia	Chiyoko Mori	Kenichi Maeyamada	Kenichi Maeyamada	—
2017-03-15	Komuro Tetsuya vs. Hyadain	"22 Seiki e no Kakehashi" (22世紀への架け橋)	TETSUYA KOMURO JOBS #1 (album)	Avex Trax	Komuro Tetsuya, Kenichi Maeyamada	Kenichi Maeyamada	Komuro Tetsuya, Kenichi Maeyamada	—
2017-03-15	Seiko Oomori	"IDOL SONG"	Kitixxxgaia (album)	Avex Trax	Seiko Oomori	Seiko Oomori	Kenichi Maeyamada	Lyrics are made up almost entirely of idol catchphrases
2017-03-29	DISH//	"JK//"	JK// (single)	Sony Music Records	DISH//, Kenichi Maeyamada	Kenichi Maeyamada	Yosuke Yamashita	TV show Otona Youseijo Banana School ending theme song for April 2017; Oricon number 11 single
2017-03-29	DISH//	"Oya no Sune Sugee Umeessune~" (親のスネスゲーうめえっすね～)	JK// (single)	Sony Music Records	DISH//, Kenichi Maeyamada	DISH//	Hiroki Arai	—
2017-05-03	9nine	"Why don't you RELAX?"	Why don't you RELAX? (single)	SME Records	Kenichi Maeyamada	Kenichi Maeyamada	Initial Talk	Samples "Relax" by Frankie Goes to Hollywood; produced by Kenichi Maeyamada; Oricon number 10 single
2017-05-03	Momoclochan Z	"Ikuze! Kaito Shoujo (Kids Odorou ver.)" (行くぜっ！怪盗少女 (キッズとおどろうver.))	Guuchoki Party! (~Minna Norinori!~) (album)	King Records	Kenichi Maeyamada	Kenichi Maeyamada	Tetsuya Shitara	—
2017-05-03	Momoclochan Z	"Coco Natsu (Kids Odorou ver.)" (ココ☆ナツ (キッズとおどろうver.))	Guuchoki Party! (~Minna Norinori!~) (album)	King Records	Kenichi Maeyamada	Kenichi Maeyamada	Tetsuya Shitara	—
2017-05-03	Momoclochan Z	"Aisatsu! I Love You!" (あいさつ!アイラブユー!)	Guuchoki Party! (~Minna Norinori!~) (album)	King Records	Kenichi Maeyamada	Kenichi Maeyamada	Kenichi Maeyamada	—
2017-05-10	Tacoyaki Rainbow	"RAINBOW ~Watashi wa Watashi Yanen kara~" (RAINBOW〜私は私やねんから〜)	RAINBOW ~Watashi wa Watashi Yanen kara~ (single); Double Rainbow (album)	Avex Trax	Kenichi Maeyamada	Kenichi Maeyamada	CMJK	Kenichi Maeyamada also produced the music video; Oricon number 7 single
2017-05-10	Tacoyaki Rainbow	"Jiyuu! Sou! Freedom!" (じゆう！そう！フリーダム！)	RAINBOW ~Watashi wa Watashi Yanen Kara~ (single); Double Rainbow (album)	Avex Trax	Kenichi Maeyamada	Kenichi Maeyamada	CMJK	—
2017-05-10	Yurika Kubo	"Jump Up!!!!" (ジャーーーーンプ アッッッップ!!!!)	Subete ga Taisetsu na Deai ~Meeting with you creates myself~ (album)	Pony Canyon	Kenichi Maeyamada	Kenichi Maeyamada	Kenichi Maeyamada	—
2017-05-31	Shiritsu Ebisu Chuugaku	"Forever Chuubou" (フォーエバー中坊)	Ebicracy (album)	SME Records	Kenichi Maeyamada	Kenichi Maeyamada	Masaya Suzuki	—
2017-06-07	Tokimeki Sendenbu	"Do Do Do Do Dreamer" (どどどどどりーまー)	Do Do Do Do Dreamer (single); Tokiotome (album)	Universal Music	Sou Takei	Kenichi Maeyamada	Yusuke Itagaki	Oricon number 7 single
2017-06-21	Ryoichi Tsukada (A.B.C-Z)	"Atsu Atsu!? Natsu Fes" (アツあつ!? 夏フェス☆)	5 Performer-Z (album)	Pony Canyon	Kenichi Maeyamada	Kenichi Maeyamada	Nao Harada	—
2017-07-12	Hayabusa	"Mirai wa Joe! Joe!" (未来はジョー!ジョー!)	Mirai wa Joe! Joe! (single)	Victor Entertainment	Kenichi Maeyamada	Kenichi Maeyamada	Kenichi Maeyamada	Anime Duel Masters (2017) opening theme song; Oricon number 13 single
2017-07-12	THE Natsu no Mamono	"Shin Mamono BOM-BA-YE ~Tamashii no Kyoumei-hen~" (シン・魔物BOM-BA-YE ～魂ノ共鳴編～)	Shin Mamono BOM-BA-YE EP (album)	Vap	Natsumi Tadano, Kenichi Maeyamada	Kenichi Maeyamada	Takashi Asano	—
2017-07-26	Gero	"Miteru Dake" (見てるだけ)	EGOIST (album)	NBCUniversal Entertainment Japan	Kenichi Maeyamada	Kenichi Maeyamada	Mitsuru	—
2017-08-02	BOYS AND MEN	"Ho wo Agero!" (帆を上げろ!)	Ho wo Agero! (single); Tomo Arite... (album)	Universal Music	Junji Ishiwatari	Kenichi Maeyamada	Yoshihiro Saito	Oricon number 2 single
2017-08-02	Momoiro Clover Z	"Yum-Yum!"	BLAST! (single)	King Records	Kenichi Maeyamada	Kenichi Maeyamada	Kenichi Maeyamada	—
2017-08-09	Kishidan	"Hasuppa" (はすっぱ)	Manyoshu (album)	Avex Trax	Kenichi Maeyamada	Kenichi Maeyamada	Kenichi Maeyamada	—
2017-08-23	Ayaka Sasaki	"My Cherry Pie" (小粋なチェリーパイ)	My Cherry Pie / My Hamburger Boy (single); A-rin Assort (album)	King Records	Kenichi Maeyamada	Kenichi Maeyamada	Makoto Miyazaki	Oricon number 9 single
2017-08-23	Ayaka Sasaki	"My Hamburger Boy"（浮気なハンバーガーボーイ）	My Cherry Pie / My Hamburger Boy (single); A-rin Assort (album)	King Records	Kenichi Maeyamada	Kenichi Maeyamada	Ruka Kawada	—
2017-08-23	Ayaka Sasaki	"Cutie Honey" (キューティーハニー)	My Cherry Pie / My Hamburger Boy (single); A-rin Assort (album)	King Records	Claude Q	Takeo Watanabe	Kenichi Maeyamada	Originally performed by Yoko Maekawa for anime Cutie Honey; theme song of Idolmatsuri 2017 ～Nationally Popular Anime Song Cover Contest～
2017-09-20	Tacoyaki Rainbow	"Money!! Money!? Money!!" (まねー!!マネー!?Money!!)	Money!! Money!? Money!! (single); Double Rainbow (album)	Avex Trax	Kenichi Maeyamada, Banbobi	Kenichi Maeyamada	CMJK	Oricon number 4 single
2017-09-20	Tacoyaki Rainbow	"Honma Mata ne Summer" (ほなまたね サマー)	Money!! Money!? Money!! (single)	Avex Trax	Kenichi Maeyamada	Kenichi Maeyamada	Kenichi Maeyamada	—
2017-10-06	LoVendoЯ!	"Buppanase Baby, I love Ya!" (ぶっぱなせ Baby, I love Ya!)	Яe:Start (album)	Zetima	Kenichi Maeyamada	Kenichi Maeyamada	Kaoru Okubo	—
2017-10-25	Asuka Nishi	"Dokidoki Shichau Dokkidoki" (どきどきしちゃうどっきどき)	Dokidoki Shichau Dokkidoki (single)	Sea Side Communications	Kenichi Maeyamada	Kenichi Maeyamada	Yoshihiro Saito	Oricon number 36 single
2017-11-15	SILENT SIREN	"Ochanomizu Graffiti" (お茶の水グラフィティ)	Aku Yuu Memorial Songs (album)	Universal Music	Yuu Aku	Kenichi Maeyamada	Naokyan	Contains posthumous work from Yuu Aku
2017-12-13	A.B.C-Z	"Bounenkai! BOU! NEN! KAI!" (忘年会 BOU! NEN! KAI!)	Bounenkai! BOU! NEN! KAI! / Shuuden wo Koete ~ Christmas Night (single); VS 5 (album)	Pony Canyon	Kenichi Maeyamada	Kenichi Maeyamada	CHOKKAKU	Oricon number 2 single
2017-12-24	Country Girls	"Kaite wa Keshite no "I Love You"" (書いては消しての "I Love You")	Kaite wa Keshite no "I Love You" (single); Seasons (album)	UpFront Records	Kenichi Maeyamada	Kenichi Maeyamada	Tomoki Suzuki	—
2018-02-07	Morning Musume	"WE ARE LEADERS! ~Leader tte no mo Tsurai Mono~" (WE ARE LEADERS! ～リーダーってのもつらいもの～)	Hatachi no Morning Musume (album)	Zetima	Kenichi Maeyamada	Kenichi Maeyamada	Yuichi Takahashi	Contains every past and present leader of Morning Musume
2018-02-14	Megumi Nakajima	"Life's the Party Time!!"	Curiosity (album)	FlyingDog	Kenichi Maeyamada, Megumi Nakajima	Kenichi Maeyamada	Kenichi Maeyamada	—
2018-02-21	Keiko Masuda	"Saigo no Koi" (最後の恋)	Saigo no Koi / Fujisan da (single); Soshite, Koko kara... (album)	Nippon Columbia; Victor Entertainment	Yuu Aku	Tokiko Kato	Kenichi Maeyamada	Originally performed by Tokiko Kato; contains posthumous work from Yuu Aku
2018-02-21	Keiko Masuda	"Fujisan da" (富士山だ)	Saigo no Koi / Fujisan da (single)	Nippon Columbia	Yuu Aku	Tokiko Kato	Kenichi Maeyamada	Originally performed by Tokiko Kato
2018-02-21	Tacoyaki Rainbow	"Double Rainbow -Introduction-"	Double Rainbow (album)	Avex Trax	Kenichi Maeyamada	Kenichi Maeyamada	Kenichi Maeyamada	—
2018-02-21	Tacoyaki Rainbow	"Whoop It Up!"	Double Rainbow (album)	Avex Trax	Kenichi Maeyamada, Koichi Yoshino	Kenichi Maeyamada, Koichi Yoshino	Wild Animals	—
2018-02-21	Tacoyaki Rainbow	"Kagayake! O Sunshine!" (輝け!おっサンシャイン！)	Double Rainbow (album)	Avex Trax	Kenichi Maeyamada	Noriaki Tsuda	Shigekazu Aida, CMJK	—
2018-02-21	Tacoyaki Rainbow	"Double Rainbow -Reprise-"	Double Rainbow (album)	Avex Trax	Kenichi Maeyamada	Kenichi Maeyamada	KiWi	—
2018-03-07	Hachimitsu Rocket	"Okashi na Watashi to Hachimitsu no Kimi" (おかしなわたしとはちみつのきみ)	Okashi na Watashi to Hachimitsu no Kimi (single)	Pony Canyon	Kenichi Maeyamada	Kenichi Maeyamada	Masaaki Asada	Anime Dagashi Kashi ending theme song; Oricon number 20 single
2018-03-07	Hayabusa	"Kumo Otoko no Dance" (蜘蛛男のダンス)	Kumo Otoko no Dance (single); Aku Yuu Memorial Songs (album)	Victor Entertainment	Yuu Aku	Kenichi Maeyamada	Kenichi Maeyamada, Yusuke Itagaki	Contains posthumous work from Yuu Aku; Oricon number 15 single
2018-04-04	Dempagumi.inc	"Girametasu Dempa Stars" (ギラメタスでんぱスターズ)	Oyasumi Polaris Sayonara Parallel World / Girametasu Dempa Stars (single); Wareware wa Dempagumi.inc da (album)	Toy's Factory	Kenichi Maeyamada	Takashi Asano	Takashi Asano	Oricon number 3 single
2018-04-11	Beboga!	"BE!"	BE! (single)	Nippon Columbia	Kenichi Maeyamada	Kenichi Maeyamada	Mitsuru	Oricon number 11 single
2018-04-25	96Neko	"Philosophy Egg" (フィロソフィーエッグ)	Philosophy Egg (single)	Sony Music Records	Gudetama	Kenichi Maeyamada	Kenichi Maeyamada	Gudetama 5th anniversary song; Oricon number 46 single
2018-05-16	=LOVE	"Kiara, Tasuke ni Kitazo" (樹愛羅、助けに来たぞ)	Teokure Caution (single)	SACRA MUSIC	Rino Sashihara	Kenichi Maeyamada	Kenichi Maeyamada	—
2018-05-16	Dempagumi.inc	"Moonlight Densetsu" (ムーンライト伝説)	Moonlight Densetsu (single); Wareware wa Dempagumi.inc da (album)	Toy's Factory	Kanako Oda	Tetsuya Komuro	Kenichi Maeyamada	Cover of anime Sailor Moon opening theme song; theme song of Idolmatsuri 2018 ～Nationally Popular Anime Song Cover Contest～
2018-05-23	Haruka Fukuhara × Haruka Tomatsu	"It's Show Time!!"	It's Show Time!! (single)	Sony Music Associated Records	Kenichi Maeyamada	Tak Miyazawa	Tak Miyazawa	TV show Koe Girl! ending theme song; Oricon number 34 single
2018-05-23	Momoiro Clover Z	"Ikuze! Kaito Shoujo -ZZ ver-" (行くぜっ!怪盗少女 -ZZ ver.-)	ZZ's (album)	King Records	Kenichi Maeyamada	Kenichi Maeyamada	invisible manners	Updated version of "Ikuze! Kaito Shoujo"
2018-05-23	Momoiro Clover Z	"Z Densetsu ~Fanfare wa Tomaranai~" (Z伝説 〜ファンファーレは止まらない〜)	ZZ's (album)	King Records	Kenichi Maeyamada	Kenichi Maeyamada	tatsuo	Updated and modified version of "Z Densetsu ~Owaranaki Kakumei~"
2018-06-27	Chikaco Sawada	"Arigatou Sayonara" (ありがとう さようなら)	LIFE ~Shiawase no Tane~ (album)	Universal Music	Kenichi Maeyamada	Kenichi Maeyamada	Mitsuru	—
2018-07-09	Yutaro Miura	"Home Sweet Home!"	Home Sweet Home! (single); FLOWERS (album)	Universal Music	Yutaro Miura	Kenichi Maeyamada	Kenichi Maeyamada	Anime Dropkick on My Devil! ending theme song
2018-08-01	Yutaro Miura	"Hataraku Watashi e" (ハタラクワタシヘ)	FLOWERS (album)	Universal Music	Yousuke Yamagami, Sayaka Arimoto, Mariko Fukuoka	Kenichi Maeyamada	Kenichi Maeyamada, Takayuki Ota	Web CM song for Uniqlo
2018-08-15	RYUCHELL	"Link"	Link (single); SUPER CANDY BOY (album)	Universal Music	Kenichi Maeyamada, RYUCHELL	Kenichi Maeyamada	Masaaki Asada	—
2018-08-29	Hayabusa	"Joe Decky!" (ジョー☆デッキー！)	Joe☆Decky! (single)	Victor Entertainment	Kenichi Maeyamada	Kenichi Maeyamada	Kenichi Maeyamada	Anime Duel Masters opening theme song; Oricon number 13 single
2018-09-12	BOYS AND MEN	"Entenka Dash" (炎・天下奪取)	Entenka Dash (single); Boimen The Best (album)	Universal Music	Kenichi Maeyamada	Kenichi Maeyamada	Keita Miyoshi	Drama Maji de Koukai Shitemasu. ~Second Season~ theme song; Oricon number 2 single
2018-09-26	Hello Pro All Stars	"Hello! History" (ハロー!ヒストリー)	YEAH YEAH YEAH / Akogare no Stress-free / Hana, Takenawa no Toki (single)	Zetima	Kenichi Maeyamada	Kenichi Maeyamada	Shoichiro Hirata	Introduction song for every group in Hello! Project
2018-10-17	RYUCHELL	"Diversity Guys!"	Diversity Guys! (single); SUPER CANDY BOY (album)	Universal Music	Kenichi Maeyamada, RYUCHELL	Kenichi Maeyamada	Masaaki Asada	—
2018-10-31	Angerme	"Tadekuu Mushi mo Like it!" (タデ食う虫もLike it!)	Tadekuu Mushi mo Like it! / 46okunen LOVE (single); Rinnetenshou ~ANGERME Past, Present & Future~ (album)	Hachama	Kenichi Maeyamada	Kenichi Maeyamada	Shunsuke Suzuki	Documentary drama Kono Manga ga Sugoi! opening theme song; Oricon number 5 single
2018-11-14	Bullet Train	"Choutokkyuu Desu!!!!!!!!" (超特急です!!!!!!!!)	GOLDEN EPOCH (album)	SDR	Yusuke	Yusuke	Kenichi Maeyamada	—
2018-12-19	BOYS AND MEN	"BOYS AND MEN Yoroshiku" (BOYS AND MEN 夜露四苦)	BOIMEN THE BEST (album)	Universal Music	Kenichi Maeyamada	Kenichi Maeyamada	Yoshihiro Saito	—
2019-01-01	Dempagumi.inc	"Taiyoukei Kansatsuchuu Seimeitai" (太陽系観察中生命体)	Wareware wa Dempagumi.inc da (album)	Toy's Factory	Kenichi Maeyamada	H ZETT M	H ZETT M	—
2019-01-01	Dempagumi.inc	"FD3, DEMPA ROCKET GO!!"	Wareware wa Dempagumi.inc da (album)	Toy's Factory	Aki Hata	Masaya Koike	Kenichi Maeyamada	—
2019-01-09	Nagi Yanagi	"continue"	yanaginagi Best Album -MUSEUM- (album)	NBCUniversal Entertainment Japan	Nagi Yanagi	Kenichi Maeyamada	Kenichi Maeyamada	—
2019-01-09	SPR5	"Kimochi wa White Xmas" (気持ちはWhite Xmas)	Supreme Revolution (album)	Pony Canyon	Kenichi Maeyamada	Kenichi Maeyamada	Tomoyuki Otake	—
2019-02-22	Shoko Nakagawa	"Aishiteru" (愛してる)	Aishiteru (single); RGB ~True Color~ (album)	Sony Music Records	Kenichi Maeyamada	Kenichi Maeyamada	Kenichi Maeyamada	Release to celebrate National Cat Day
2019-02-27	Tacoyaki Rainbow	"Watashi, Tada Koi wo Shiteiru" (私、ただ恋をしている)	Nantaiteki na Voyage (album)	Avex Trax	Kenichi Maeyamada	Kenichi Maeyamada	Kaoru Inoue	—
2019-03-13	Momoclochan Z × Toretans	"Denden Densha" (でんでん でんしゃ)	Guuchoki Party! (~Marugoto Norinori!~) (album)	King Records	Kenichi Maeyamada	Kenichi Maeyamada	Mitsuki Tokuda	—
2019-03-13	Shiritsu Ebisu Chuugaku	"Nakameguro no Fuyukaze....NAMIDA" (中目黒の冬風・・・NAMIDA)	MUSiC (album)	SME Records	Kenichi Maeyamada	Kenichi Maeyamada	Mitsuki Tokuda	Duet unit song with three different versions
2019-03-27	GORIPARA	"Kittanee Chuunen no Kenmonroku" (きったねぇ中年の見聞録)	On The Road (single)	Avex Trax	Kenichi Maeyamada	Kenichi Maeyamada	Tota Fujiwara	— h
2019-04-10	RYUCHELL	"SUPER CANDY BOY"	SUPER CANDY BOY (album)	Universal Music	Kenichi Maeyamada, RYUCHELL	Kenichi Maeyamada	Masaaki Asada	RYUCHELL's theme song
2019-04-10	RYUCHELL	"You Are My Love"	SUPER CANDY BOY (album)	Universal Music	Kenichi Maeyamada, RYUCHELL	Kenichi Maeyamada	Masaaki Asada	—
2019-05-01	Hiromi Ohta	"Suteki no Kiseki" (ステキのキセキ)	Suteki no Kiseki / Sakurazukiyo (single); Hiromi Deluxe (album)	Sony Music Direct	Hiromi Ohta	Kenichi Maeyamada	Kenichi Maeyamada	45th anniversary single; first single in 35 years
2019-05-03	The Dance for Philosophy	"Like A Zombie ~Hyadain no RiRiRiRi Remix~" (ライク・ア・ゾンビ〜ヒャダインのリリリリ☆リミックス〜)	Like A Zombie ~Hyadain no RiRiRiRi☆Remix~ (single); SAPIOSEXUAL (album)	Philosophy of the World	Sho Yamamoto	Gento Miyano	Kenichi Maeyamada	—
2019-05-15	Angerme	"Jinsei, Sunawachi Panta Rhei" (人生、すなわちパンタ・レイ)	Rinnetenshou ~ANGERME Past, Present & Future~ (album)	Hachama	Kenichi Maeyamada	Kenichi Maeyamada	Shunsuke Suzuki	—
2019-05-17	Momoiro Clover Z	"Momoclo no Reiwa Nippon Banzai!" (ももクロの令和ニッポン万歳!)	MOMOIRO CLOVER Z (album)	King Records	Kenichi Maeyamada	Kenichi Maeyamada	Mitsuki Tokuda	Updated version of "Momoclo no Nippon Banzai!" from Battle and Romance
2019-06-15	i☆Ris	"Doraemon no Uta" (ドラえもんのうた)	Doraemon no Uta (single)	Five II entertainment	Takumi Kusube	Shunsuke Kikuchi	Kenichi Maeyamada	Cover of anime Doraemon opening theme song; theme song of Idolmatsuri 2019 ～Nationally Popular Anime Song Cover Contest～
2019-06-26	Shoko Nakagawa	"Type: Wild" (タイプ：ワイルド)	Kaze to Issho ni (single); RGB ~True Color~ (album)	Sony Music Records	Akihito Toda	Hirokazu Tanaka	Kenichi Maeyamada	Anime Pokémon the Series: Sun & Moon ending theme song; originally performed by Rica Matsumoto
2019-06-26	Urashimasakatasen	"Makoto -Live for Justice-" (誠-Live for Justice-)	$HUFFLE (album)	NBCUniversal Entertainment Japan	Kenichi Maeyamada	Kenichi Maeyamada	Tota Fujiwara	—
2019-07-03	Ikusaburo Yamazaki	"Theme of MIRROR BALL'19"	MIRROR BALL'19 (album)	Universal Music	—	Kenichi Maeyamada	Kenichi Maeyamada	—
2019-07-03	Ikusaburo Yamazaki	"Theme of MIRROR BALL'19 (Reprise)"	MIRROR BALL'19 (album)	Universal Music	—	Kenichi Maeyamada	Kenichi Maeyamada	—
2019-07-03	Ikusaburo Yamazaki	—	MIRROR BALL'19 (album)	Universal Music	—	—	—	Fully produced by Kenichi Maeyamada
2019-07-24	Daisuke Yokoyama	"Bontakatakka Bonbon Ondo" (ぼんたかたっか ぼんぼん音頭)	Utabukuro (album)	SME Records	Kenichi Maeyamada	Kenichi Maeyamada	Kenichi Maeyamada	—
2019-07-24	Daisuke Yokoyama	"Cheese Banzai!" (チーズばんざい)	Utabukuro (album)	SME Records	Kenichi Maeyamada	Kenichi Maeyamada	Kenichi Maeyamada	—
2019-07-24	Daisuke Yokoyama	"ENJOY! Randoseru" (ENJOY! ランドセル)	Utabukuro (album)	SME Records	Kenichi Maeyamada	Kenichi Maeyamada	Kenichi Maeyamada	CM song for Seiban commercial
2019-08-28	Ayaka Sasaki	"Watashi wo Erande! Hanawa-kun" (私を選んで!花輪くん)	Odoro Ponpokolin (single)	King Records	Kenichi Maeyamada	Kenichi Maeyamada	Mitsuki Tokuda	Features Chibi Maruko-chan characters Kazuhiko Hanawa and Hanako Migiwa
2019-09-04	Hayabusa	"Chouten Fever!" (超天フィーバー！)	Chouten Fever! (single)	Victor Entertainment	Kenichi Maeyamada	Kenichi Maeyamada	Kenichi Maeyamada	Anime Duel Masters!! opening theme song; Oricon number 17 single
2019-09-06	Ayaka Sasaki	"Kimi ga Suki da to Sakebitai" (君が好きだと叫びたい)	Kimi ga Suki da to Sakebitai (single)	King Records	Kyouji Yamada	Yoshio Tatano	Kenichi Maeyamada	Cover of Baad's opening theme song for SLAM DUNK
2019-10-23	Nagano & Takagi	"You Are Not Alone" (ユーアノッアロン)	You Are Not Alone (single); Renichan WORLD (album)	King Records	Nagano & Takagi	Kenichi Maeyamada	Yusuke Itagaki	Theme song for Eccentric Comic Show Nagano to Tagaki. 3 TWO MAN LIVE
2019-10-23	Tacoyaki Rainbow	"Motto Motto Motto Hanasou yo -Digital Native Generation-" (もっともっともっと話そうよ-Digital Native Generation-)	Motto Motto Motto Hanasou yo -Digital Native Generation- (single)	Avex Trax	Kenichi Maeyamada	Kenichi Maeyamada	Kenichi Maeyamada	Oricon number 4 single
2019-11-01	Hiromi Ohta	"Tayutau Mono" (たゆたうもの)	Hiromi Deluxe (album)	Sony Music Direct	Kenichi Maeyamada	Kenichi Maeyamada	Kenichi Maeyamada	—
2019-11-04	Chocolate Planet	"TT Taisou" (TT体操)	TT Taisou (single)	Yoshimoto Music	TAKESHI	Kenichi Maeyamada, TAKESHI	Kenichi Maeyamada	—
2019-11-20	Hoshikuzi Scat	"Shinjuku Chanson (Hyadain no RiRiRiRi Remix -Shinjuku Mugen Jigoku-hen-)" (新宿シャンソン (ヒャダインのリリリリ☆リミックス -新宿無間地獄篇-))	Shinjuku EP (album)	Nippon Columbia	Elvis Woodstock	Tadashi Ueda	Kenichi Maeyamada	—
2019-11-27	BEYOOOOONDS	"Kinoko Takenoko Taisenki" (きのこたけのこ大戦記)	BEYOOOOOND1St (album)	Zetima	Kenichi Maeyamada	Kenichi Maeyamada	Kenichi Maeyamada, Mitsuki Tokuda	—
2019-11-27	Momoiro Clover Z	"Santa-san -ZZ Ver.-" (サンタさん -ZZ ver.-)	Stay Gold (single)	King Records	Kenichi Maeyamada	Kenichi Maeyamada	Mitsuki Tokuda	Lyrics modified by Kenichi Maeyamada
2019-11-27	Momoiro Clover Z	"Coco Natsu -ZZ Ver.-" (ココ☆ナツ -ZZ ver.-)	Stay Gold (single)	King Records	Kenichi Maeyamada	Kenichi Maeyamada	Mitsuki Tokuda	Lyrics modified by Kenichi Maeyamada
2019-11-27	Shoko Nakagawa & SKY PEACE	"Rokujouma Kara, Sekai e" (六畳間から、世界へ)	RGB ~True Color~ (album)	Sony Music Records	Kenichi Maeyamada	Kenichi Maeyamada	Kenichi Maeyamada	CM song for AEON Nobirucchi Pants
2019-12-15	Urashimasakatasen	"Gotcha!!"	Gotcha!! (single)	NBCUniversal Entertainment Japan	Kenichi Maeyamada	Kenichi Maeyamada	Tota Fujiwara	Anime Duel Masters!! opening theme song
2020-01-29	GANG PARADE	"FiX YOUR TEETH"	Namida no Stage / FiX YOUR TEETH (single)	Warner Music Japan	Kenichi Maeyamada	Kenichi Maeyamada	Kenta Matsukuma	Collaboration single between Kenta Matsukuma and Kenichi Maeyamada
2020-01-29	GANG PARADE	"Namida no Stage" (涙のステージ)	Namida no Stage / FiX YOUR TEETH (single)	Warner Music Japan	Kenta Matsukuma	Kenta Matsukuma	Kenichi Maeyamada	Collaboration single between Kenta Matsukuma and Kenichi Maeyamada
2020-01-29	Kitsune × EXIT	"L.O.K.F"	L.O.K.F (single)	Yoshimoto Music	Kenichi Maeyamada	Kenichi Maeyamada	Jockie "MASTA BASS" Suama	Produced by Kenichi Maeyamada
2020-02-12	halca	"Ride on Music!"	Assortrip (album)	SACRA MUSIC	Kenichi Maeyamada	Kenichi Maeyamada	Kenichi Maeyamada	—
2020-03-04	Inai Inai Baa!	"Peek-a-Peek-a-Boo~" (ピカピカブ〜)	NHK Inai Inai Baa! Peek-a-Peek-a-Boo~!	Nippon Columbia	Kenichi Maeyamada	Kenichi Maeyamada	Kenichi Maeyamada	Produced by Kenichi Maeyamada
2020-04-15	Dempagumi.inc	"Ai ga Chikyuu Sukuunsa! Datte Dempagumi.inc wa Family Desho" (愛が地球救うんさ!だってでんぱ組.incはファミリーでしょ)	Ai ga Chikyuu Sukuunsa! Datte Dempagumi.inc wa Family Desho (album)	Toy's Factory	Kenichi Maeyamada	Takashi Asano	Takashi Asano	—
2020-04-15	Dempagumi.inc	"Nanto! Sekai Kounin no Hikikomori!" (なんと!世界公認 引きこもり!)	—	Kenichi Maeyamada	Kenichi Maeyamada	Takashi Asano	Shunsuke Tsuri	Written and recorded entirely over the internet
2020-06-11	Ayaka Sasaki	"Happy Sweet Birthday!" (ハッピー♡スイート♡バースデー!)	Happy♡Sweet♡Birthday! (single); A-rin Assort (album)	King Records	Kenichi Maeyamada	Kenichi Maeyamada	Kenichi Maeyamada	—
2020-06-19	Fischer's	"Suki na Koto Museigen" (好きなこと無制限)	Suki na Koto Museigen (single)	King Records	Kenichi Maeyamada	Kenichi Maeyamada	Kenichi Maeyamada	Kenichi Maeyamada appears in the music video
2020-07-08	Ayaka Sasaki	"Aarinture" (あーりんちゅあ)	A-rin Assort (album)	King Records	—	Kenichi Maeyamada	Kenichi Maeyamada	—
2020-07-08	Ayaka Sasaki	"Shigotoshiro" (仕事しろ)	A-rin Assort (album)	King Records	Kenichi Maeyamada	Kenichi Maeyamada	Mitsuki Tokuda	Support song for Shuta Ishikawa from the Fukuoka SoftBank Hawks
2020-07-31	The Coinlockers	"Yume ga Nai Boku ga Yume wo Mitanda" (夢がない僕が夢をみたんだ)	Yume ga Nai Boku ga Yume wo Mitanda (single); Seishun to Band Wa Tanoshikute Mendokusai (album)	Warner Music Japan	Kenichi Maeyamada	Yusuke Itagaki	Yusuke Itagaki	First song by The Coinlockers not to have Yasushi Akimoto as lyricist
2020-08-04	Hayabusa	"Kin Kira KING!" (キンキラKING!)	Kin Kira KING! (single)	Victor Entertainment	Kenichi Maeyamada	Kenichi Maeyamada	Kenichi Maeyamada	Anime Duel Masters King opening theme song; Oricon number 16 single
2020-08-19	Hiro Shimono	"WE GO -On Your Mark-"	WE GO (album)	Pony Canyon	Kenichi Maeyamada	Kenichi Maeyamada	Yusuke Itagaki	—
2020-08-21	Shiritsu Ebisu Chuugaku	"Sweet of Sweet ~Kimi ni Todoku Made~" (Sweet of Sweet ～君に届くまで～)	FAMIEN'20 e.p. (album)	SME Records	Love Watarou	Kenichi Maeyamada	Tota Fujiwara	Kubota LOVE Water Project theme song
2020-09-02	halca	"Kokuhaku Bungee Jump" (告白バンジージャンプ)	Kokuhaku Bungee Jump (single)	SACRA MUSIC	Kenichi Maeyamada	Kenichi Maeyamada	Yusuke Itagaki	Anime Rent-A-Girlfriend ending theme song; Oricon number 23 single
2020-09-09	BOYS AND MEN	"D.T.G"	Oh Yeah (single); BOYMEN the Universe (album)	Universal Music	Kenichi Maeyamada	Kenichi Maeyamada	Mitsuki Tokuda	—
2020-09-23	The Dance for Philosophy	"Don't Stop The Dance" (ドント・ストップ・ザ・ダンス)	Don't Stop The Dance (single); Ai no Tetsugaku (album)	Sony Music Records	Kenichi Maeyamada	mrmr	Sosaku Sasaki, mrmr	Oricon number 2 single
2020-11-17	Dempagumi.inc	"Positive Story" (ポジティブ☆ストーリー)	Positive☆Story (single)	Toy's Factory	Eimi Naruse, Kenichi Maeyamada	Takashi Asano	Shunsuke Tsuri	Graduation song for Eimi Naruse
2020-11-25	ŹOOĻ	"Sasagero -You Are mine-" (ササゲロ -You are mine-)	einsatZ (album)	Lantis	Kenichi Maeyamada	Kenichi Maeyamada	Kenichi Maeyamada	—
2020-12-04	Maikichi	"Heroine Ganbou Bousouchuu" (ヒロイン願望 暴走中)	Heroine Ganbou Bousouchuu (single)	Virgin Music	Kenichi Maeyamada	Kenichi Maeyamada	Kenichi Maeyamada	Drama Totsuzen Heroine ~Shoujo Manga mitai na Koi, shiyo!~ theme song
2021-02-24	Momoiro Clover Z	"overture ~Momoiro Clover Z Sanjou!!~" (overture ～ももいろクローバーZ参上!!～)	Tanaka Masahiro (album)	King Records	Kenichi Maeyamada	Kenichi Maeyamada	Kenichi Maeyamada	Used as a warm-up song by Masahiro Tanaka of the New York Yankees
2020-12-25	Appare!	"2020"	2020 (single); Appare! Parade (album)	Appare! Records	Kenichi Maeyamada	Kenichi Maeyamada	Tota Fujiwara	—
2021-02-18	Takeshi Tsuruno	"Mainichi Everyday" (まいにちエブリデイ)	Mainichi Everyday (single)	Pony Canyon	Kenichi Maeyamada	Kenichi Maeyamada	Kenichi Maeyamada	Song for show Chuggington
2021-03-10	Appare!	"Appear on the stage"	Appare! Parade (album)	Appare! Records	Kenichi Maeyamada	Kenichi Maeyamada	Masaaki Asada	—
2021-03-17	Urashimasakatasen	"Nomeya, Utaeya, Odoreya, Sawage" (飲めや 歌えや 踊れや 騒げ)	Nomeya, Utaeya, Odoreya, Sawage (single)	NBCUniversal Entertainment	Kenichi Maeyamada	Kenichi Maeyamada	Tota Fujiwara	—
2021-05-19	Dempagumi.inc	"Princess Dempa Power! Shine On!" (プリンセスでんぱパワー! シャインオン!)	Princess Dempa Power! Shine On! / Senshuu Banzai! Dempa Ichiza! (single); DEMPARK!!! (album)	Toy's Factory	Kenichi Maeyamada	Kenichi Maeyamada	Shunsuke Tsuri	First 10-member single; Oricon number 6 single
2021-06-05	NORD	"Kita Kara Kita! Sexy Dynamite!!" (きたからきた！セクシーダイナマイト！！)	Kita Kara Kita! Sexy Dynamite!! (single); N The BEST (album)	Sony Music Entertainment	Kenichi Maeyamada	Kenichi Maeyamada	Keita Miyoshi	5th anniversary single
2021-07-14	Niji no Conquistador	"Umai Mono Fanclub" (美味いものファンクラブ)	RAINBOW SUMMER SHOWER (album)	King Records	Kenichi Maeyamada	Kenichi Maeyamada	Takashi Asano	Theme song for tie-in YouTube series with Zen-Noh Todoke! Fun Farm
2021-07-19	Utakata Parties	"CHUPA CHUWA Shichaitai!" (CHUPA☆CHUWAしちゃいたい！)	CHUPA☆CHUWA Shichaitai! (single)	BIG UP!	Kenichi Maeyamada	Kenichi Maeyamada	Yusuke Itagaki	Video game Lords Mobile image song won by Utakata Parties
2021-07-21	King & Prince	"Fiijadiva Gravibo Brazi Potato!" (フィジャディバ グラビボ ブラジポテト！)	Re:Sense (album)	Universal Music	Kenichi Maeyamada	Kenichi Maeyamada	Takashi Asano	—
2021-08-06	Fischer's	"6 PACK PARADISE ~Joshou~" (6 PACK PARADISE 〜序章〜)	6 PACK PARADISE ~Joshou~ (single)	UUUM RECORDS	Kenichi Maeyamada	Kenichi Maeyamada	Kenichi Maeyamada	—
2021-08-18	Shiritsu Ebisu Chuugaku	"Gozonji! Ebichu Ondo 2021ver." (ご存知！エビ中音頭 2021ver.)	FAMIEN'21 L.P. (album)	SME Records	Kenichi Maeyamada	Kenichi Maeyamada	Kenichi Maeyamada	—
2021-08-18	Tokyo Rickshaw	"Nibiiro Tokyo ~Chanchiki Okesa~" (ニビイロトーキョー ~チャンチキおけさ~)	Nibiiro Tokyo ~Chanchiki Okesa~ (single)	Teichiku Entertainment	Hachiro Kadoi, Kenichi Maeyamada	Yoshiji Nagatsu, Kenichi Maeyamada	Kentaro Ishii	Based on "Chanchiki Okesa" by Haruo Minami; Oricon number 13 single
2021-09-22	Dempagumi.inc	"Tamamushi-iro Homosapiens" (玉虫色ホモサピエンス)	Shoudouteki S/K/S/D (single); DEMPARK!!! (album)	Toy's Factory	Kenichi Maeyamada	Kenichi Maeyamada	Shunsuke Tsuri	—
2021-10-04	Okitaland Kids	"Okitattaa" (おきたったー)	Okitattaa (single)	Ohayou Asahi Desu	Kenichi Maeyamada	Kenichi Maeyamada	Kenichi Maeyamada	Asahi TV show Ohayou Asahi Desu main theme song; children chosen by Kenichi Maeyamada via audition; produced by Kenichi Maeyamada
2021-10-27	Sumire Uesaka	"Seikatsu Konkyuu Dame Dinero" (生活こんきゅーダメディネロ)	Seikatsu Konkyuu Dame Dinero (single); ANTHOLOGY&DESTINY (album)	King Records	Kenichi Maeyamada	Kenichi Maeyamada	Tota Fujiwara	Anime The Great Jahy Will Not Be Defeated! opening theme song; Oricon number 23 single
2021-11-17	Kanjani8	"Kanjani8 on the STAGE" (関ジャニ∞ on the STAGE)	8BEAT (album)	Infinity Records	Kenichi Maeyamada	Kenichi Maeyamada	Shogo Ohnishi	—
2021-12-01	Aina Suzuki	"RED BLAZE: BLUE FLAME"	Belle révolte (album)	Lantis	Kenichi Maeyamada	Masayoshi Soken	Masayoshi Soken	—
2021-12-24	Momoiro Clover Z	"BUTTOBI!"	BUTTOBI! (single); Shukuten (album)	King Records	Kenichi Maeyamada	Kenichi Maeyamada	Hirofumi Hibino	Game Momotaro Dentetsu collaboration theme song
2022-01-12	AraNaruMey	"Omae no Koto Nanka Suki Janai Kara Naa!!!" (お前のことなんか 好きじゃないからなー！！！)	Omae no Koto Nanka Suki Janai Kara Naa!!! (single)	Universal Music	Kenichi Maeyamada	Kenichi Maeyamada	Tota Fujiwara	—
2022-03-09	Shoko Nakagawa	"Kimi no Manma ga Iindayo" (君のまんまがいいんだよ)	Kimi no Manma ga Iindayo (single)	Sony Music Records	Kenichi Maeyamada	Kenichi Maeyamada	Kenichi Maeyamada	Movie Shimajirou to Kirakira Oukoku no Oujisama theme song; Oricon number 13 single
2022-03-09	Shoko Nakagawa	"Kumo no Ue ni Kumo wa Nakute" (雲の上に雲はなくて)	Kimi no Manma ga Iindayo (single)	Sony Music Records	Kenichi Maeyamada	Kenichi Maeyamada	Tota Fujiwara	—
2022-03-16	Dempagumi.inc	"Doki + Waku = Parade!" (ドキ+ワク=パレード！)	Doki + Waku = Parade! (single); DEMPARK!!! (album)	Toy's Factory	Kenichi Maeyamada	Daisuke Asakura	Daisuke Asakura	Oricon number 9 single
2022-03-16	NU-KO & yunocy	"No Day But Today!"	beatmania IIDX 29 CastHour ORIGINAL SOUNDTRACK (album)	Konami Digital Entertainment	Kenichi Maeyamada	Kenichi Maeyamada	Kenichi Maeyamada, Tota Fujiwara	Support song for the BEMANI PRO LEAGUE 2021 event
2022-04-13	ROF-MAO	"Let's Get The Party Started!"	Crack Up!!!! (album)	ANYCOLOR	Kenichi Maeyamada	Kenichi Maeyamada	Yasushi Watanabe	Produced by Kenichi Maeyamada
2022-06-15	Mewhan	"Corocoro Tamashii!" (コロコロ魂！)	Corocoro Tamashii! (single)	88rising	Mewhan	Mewhan	Kenichi Maeyamada	45th anniversary song for CoroCoro Comic
2022-06-29	King & Prince	"Battle of Butler!" (バトル・オブ・バトラー!)	Made in (album)	Universal Music	Kenichi Maeyamada	Kenichi Maeyamada	Shogo Ohnishi	Sequel to "Fiijadiva Gravibo Brazi Potato!"
2022-07-13	Naniwa Danshi	"Bokuzora ~Ashiato No Nai Mirai～" (僕空～足跡のない未来～)	1st Love (album)	J Storm	Kenichi Maeyamada	Kenichi Maeyamada	Shogo Ohnishi	—
2022-07-13	Shikao Suga x Hyadain	"Monster Disco" (モンスターディスコ)	Monster Disco (single)	Speedstar Records	Shikao Suga	Shikao Suga	Kenichi Maeyamada	Anime Digimon Ghost Game 4th ending theme song
2022-07-20	Tokyo Rickshaw	"Sole! ~Omanta Hayashi~" (Sole！～おまんた囃子～)	Sole! ~Omanta Hayashi~ (single)	Teichiku Entertainment	Haruo Minami, Kenichi Maeyamada	Haruo Minami, Kenichi Maeyamada	Yusuke Itagaki	Based on "Omanta Hayashi" by Haruo Minami; Oricon number 5 single
2022-08-05	Ken Matsudaira	"Matsuken EDM" (マツケンEDM)	Matsuken EDM (single)	NBCUniversal Entertainment Japan	Shunsuke Kikuchi, Kenichi Maeyamada	Shunsuke Kikuchi, Kenichi Maeyamada	TeddyLoid	Third song in the Matsuken Series; produced by Kenichi Maeyamada
2022-08-26	meiyo	"Karekore no Korekara" (彼此のコレカラ)	Karekore no Korekara (single)	Universal Music	meiyo	meiyo	meiyo, Kenichi Maeyamada	YouTube anime Konketsu no Karekore opening theme
2022-09-21	Shiritsu Ebisu Chuugaku	"Ebichu Shusseki Bangou no Uta Sono 3" (エビ中出席番号の歌 その3)	Chukichi (album)	SME Records	Kenichi Maeyamada	Kenichi Maeyamada	Satsuki ga Tenkomori	—
2022-09-28	BEYOOOOONDS	"Koshi Tanta Turn" (視タンタ・ターン)	BEYOOOOO2NDS (album)	Zetima	Ameko Kodama	Kenichi Maeyamada	DANCE MAN	—
2022-10-19	SUCCESS	"JUMP & SONIC - HEY-YO!! -"	—	—	Kenichi Maeyamada, teamSUCCESS	Kenichi Maeyamada	Kenichi Maeyamada	Group formed by Kao Corporation brand Success
2022-12-14	Dempagumi.inc	"Seppun ~Raburabu Chu~" (接吻〜らぶらぶ🖤ちゅ〜)	Dempakashic Records (album)	Toy's Factory	e-nne (FICE), Kenichi Maeyamada	e-nne (FICE)	Kenichi Maeyamada	Rap lyrics by Kenichi Maeyamada
—	Maimai from Tacoyaki Rainbow	"Maicchingu Maimai Magic" (まいっちんぐ☆まいまいマジック)	—		Kenichi Maeyamada	Kenichi Maeyamada	Kenichi Maeyamada	—
—	Dotonburi Kagekidan (Renren & Sakuchan) from Tacoyaki Rainbow	"Michiko to Clarice ~Kandou no Saikai-hen~" (道子とクラリス～感動の再会編～)	—		Kenichi Maeyamada	Kenichi Maeyamada	Kenichi Maeyamada	—
—	Dotonburi Kagekidan (Renren & Sakuchan) from Tacoyaki Rainbow	"Michiko to Clarice ~Tamashii no Gekitou-hen~" (道子とクラリス 〜魂の激闘編〜)	—		Kenichi Maeyamada	Kenichi Maeyamada	Kenichi Maeyamada	—
—	Home Saikyou	"Familia De Cerezo" (ファミリア・デ・セレッソ)	—		Hiroaki Morishima, Kenichi Maeyamada	Kenichi Maeyamada	CMJK	Collaboration with Cerezo Osaka
—	Team Syachihoko	"Manpuku! Fue Romance" (満腹! 笛ロマンス)	—		Bakarhythm	Kenichi Maeyamada	Kenichi Maeyamada	Performed on Bangumi Bakarhythm
—	Momoiro Clover Z	"Atarashii Aozora e" (新しい青空へ)	—		Kenichi Maeyamada	Kenichi Maeyamada	Takayuki Ota	Graduation song for Momoka Ariyasu
—	IDOL SCHOOL	"Qingchun Wu Hui" (青春无悔)	—	—	Qian Lin	Qian Lin	Kenichi Maeyamada	—

=== Anime Works ===
Release date	Artist	Title	Album	Label	Lyricist	Composer	Arranger	Notes
2009-03-18	Yukino Noel starring Sayaka Kitahara	"Makenki! Tsuyoki! Genki! Maemuki!" (負けん気!強気!元気!前向き!)	Kirarin Revolution Song Selection 5 (album)	Zetima	Kenichi Maeyamada	Kenichi Maeyamada	Kenichi Maeyamada	From anime Kirarin Revolution
2009-03-18	Hanasaki Cobeni starring Kikkawa Yuu	"Hate Hatena" (はてはてな)	Kirarin Revolution Song Selection 5 (album)	Zetima	Kenichi Maeyamada	Kenichi Maeyamada	Kenichi Maeyamada	From anime Kirarin Revolution
2010-08-11	Mitsuba Marui (Ayahi Takagaki), Futaba Marui (Satomi Akesaka), Hitoha Marui (Haruka Tomatsu)	"Mittsu Kazoete Daishuugou!" (みっつ数えて大集合!)	Mittsu Kazoete Daishuugou! (single)	Lantis	Aki Hata	Kenichi Maeyamada	Kenichi Maeyamada	Anime Mitsudomoe first opening theme song; Oricon number 32 single
2010-08-11	Mitsuba Marui (Ayahi Takagaki), Futaba Marui (Satomi Akesaka), Hitoha Marui (Haruka Tomatsu)	"Tsuyoi Surudoi Shougakusei" (つよいするどいしょうがくせい)	Mittsu Kazoete Daishuugou! (single); Mitsudomobest (album)	Lantis	Aki Hata	Kenichi Maeyamada	Kenichi Maeyamada	Character song of the Marui triplets from anime Mitsudomoe
2010-08-25	Mitsuba Marui (Ayahi Takagaki)	"Arigataku Omoinasai yo ne!!" (ありがたく思いなさいよねっ!!)	Mitsudomoe Character Song CD 1 - Mitsuba (single); Mitsudomobest (album)	Lantis	Kenichi Maeyamada	L.Mount Garage	Kyo Takada	Mitsuba Marui character song from anime Mitsudomoe
2010-08-25	Mitsuba Marui (Ayahi Takagaki)	"Choujo da shi, ne!" (長女だし、ねっ!)	Mitsudomoe Character Song CD 1 - Mitsuba (single)	Lantis	Kenichi Maeyamada	Tomoki Kikuya	Tomoki Kikuya	Mitsuba Marui character song from anime Mitsudomoe
2010-08-25	Futaba Marui (Satomi Akesaka)	"ABC yori DEF ssu!!" (ABCよりDEFっス!!)	Mitsudomoe Character Song CD 2 - Futaba (single); Mitsudomobest (album)	Lantis	Kenichi Maeyamada	Kenichi Maeyamada	Kenichi Maeyamada	Futaba Marui character song from anime Mitsudomoe
2010-08-25	Futaba Marui (Satomi Akesaka)	"Otona ni Nattara..." (大人になったら)	Mitsudomoe Character Song CD 2 - Futaba (single)	Lantis	Kenichi Maeyamada	Kenichi Maeyamada	Kenichi Maeyamada	Futaba Marui character song from anime Mitsudomoe
2010-08-25	Erika (Mariya Ise)	"Groovin'"	Kaichou wa Maid-sama! Maid Latte Songs! (album)	Geneon Universal Entertainment Japan	Aya Harukazu	Satomi Kawasaki	Kenichi Maeyamada	From anime Maid Sama!
2010-10-27	Sakiko Matsuoka (Ikumi Hayama)	"Akuryousan Irasshai!!" (悪霊さん いらっしゃい!!)	Mitsudomoe Character Song CD 5 - Matsuoka (single); Mitsudomobest (album)	Lantis	Kenichi Maeyamada	Kenichi Maeyamada	Kenichi Maeyamada	Sakiko Matsuoka character song from anime Mitsudomoe; features ghost sounds done by Kenichi Maeyamada
2010-10-27	Sakiko Matsuoka (Ikumi Hayama)	"Doukyuusei wa Reibaishi!! (Iya, Chigau kara...)" (同級生は霊媒師!!(いや、違うから...))	Mitsudomoe Character Song CD 5 - Matsuoka (single)	Lantis	Kenichi Maeyamada	Tomoki Kikuya	Tomoki Kikuya	Sakiko Matsuoka character song from anime Mitsudomoe
2010-11-24	Shiori Itou (Yuka Iguchi), Mayumi Katou (Aya Uchida), Airi Ogata (Minori Chihara)	"Satou-kun ga Suki de Shou ga Nai Tai" (佐藤くんが好きでしょうがない隊)	Mitsudomoe Character Song CD 6 - Satou-kun ga Suki de Shou ga Nai Tai (single)	Lantis	Kenichi Maeyamada	Kenichi Maeyamada	Kenichi Maeyamada	Character song for the Hopeless Squad from anime Mitsudomoe
2010-11-24	Chikubi (Momoko Saitou)	"Chikubi no Shichihenge" (チクビの七変化)	Mitsudomoe Character Song CD 7 - Chikubi (single); Mitsudomobest (album)	Lantis	Kenichi Maeyamada	Kenichi Maeyamada	Kenichi Maeyamada	Chikubi character song done entirely in hamster squeaks from anime Mitsudomoe
2010-11-24	Chikubi & Aiko Kuriyama (Momoko Saitou)	"Oshiete, Chikubi-chan" (おしえてチクビちゃん)	Mitsudomoe Character Song CD 7 - Chikubi (single)	Lantis	Kenichi Maeyamada	Kenichi Maeyamada	Kenichi Maeyamada	Chikubi character song from anime Mitsudomoe
2011-01-26	Nagisa Saito (Azusa Kataoka)	"Nagisa wa Surfing Go! Go! Go!" (渚はサーフィン Go!Go!Go!)	Shinryaku! Ika Musume Drama CD Janaika? (album)	Mellow Head	Kenichi Maeyamada	Kenichi Maeyamada	Kenichi Maeyamada	Nagisa Saito character song from anime Squid Girl
2011-01-26	Nise Ika Musume (Ayako Kawasumi)	"Mo・Ji・Mo・Ji Beating Heart" (も・じ・も・じ Beating☆Heart)	Shinryaku! Ika Musume Drama CD Janaika? (album)	Mellow Head	Kenichi Maeyamada	Kenichi Maeyamada	Kenichi Maeyamada	Nise Ika Musume (Fake Squid Girl) character song from anime Squid Girl
2011-01-26	Mitsuba Marui (Ayahi Takagaki), Futaba Marui (Satomi Akesaka), Hitoha Marui (Haruka Tomatsu)	"Waga Na wa Shougakusei" (わが名は小学生)	Waga Na wa Shougakusei (single)	Lantis	Kenichi Maeyamada	Kenichi Maeyamada	Kenichi Maeyamada	Anime Mitsudomoe Zouryouchuu! opening theme song; Oricon number 49 single
2011-01-26	Yabecchi (Hiro Shimono)	"Waga Na wa Cherry Boy" (わが名はチェリーボーイ)	Waga Na wa Shougakusei (single); Mitsudomobest (album)	Lantis	Kenichi Maeyamada	Kenichi Maeyamada, Hiro Shimono	Kenichi Maeyamada	Based on a song improvised by Hiro Shimono at Mitsudomoe in Niconama "Namadomoe" Episode 4; song from anime Mitsudomoe Zouryouchuu!
2011-04-06	Miyashita (Momoko Oohara)	"Uzai ka" (ウザイカ)	Mitsudomobest (album)	Lantis	Kenichi Maeyamada	Kenichi Maeyamada	Kenichi Maeyamada	Miyashita character song from anime Mitsudomoe
2011-04-06	Shinya Satou (Yuko Sanpei), Yuudai Chiba (Kazutomi Yamamoto)	"Seishun wa Hanaji-iro" (青春はハナヂ色)	Mitsudomobest (album)	Lantis	Kenichi Maeyamada	Kenichi Maeyamada	Kenichi Maeyamada	Character song for Shinya Satou and Yuudai Chiba from anime Mitsudomoe
2011-04-06	Mitsuba Marui (Ayahi Takagaki), Futaba Marui (Satomi Akesaka), Hitoha Marui (Haruka Tomatsu)	"Mousugu Chuugakusei" (もうすぐ中学生)	Mitsudomobest (album)	Lantis	Kenichi Maeyamada	Kenichi Maeyamada	Kenichi Maeyamada	From anime Mitsudomoe
2011-06-22	Hakase (Hiromi Konno), Nano Shinonome (Shizuka Furuya), Sakamoto (Minoru Shiraishi)	"Shinonome Kenkyuusho no, Kyou mo Heiwa Desu" (東雲研究所の、今日も平和です)	WEB Radio - Nichijou no Radio (single)	Lantis	Kenichi Maeyamada	Kenichi Maeyamada	Kenichi Maeyamada	Sung by the Shinonome household; from radio program Nichijou no Radio
2011-06-22	Yuuko Aioi (Mariko Honda), Mio Naganohara (Mai Aizawa), Mai Minakami (Misuzu Togashi)	"Yukko-Mio-Mai no Sucharaka San-nin Shuu" (ゆっこ・みお・麻衣のスチャラカ三人衆)	WEB Radio - Nichijou no Radio (single)	Lantis	Kenichi Maeyamada	Kenichi Maeyamada	Kenichi Maeyamada	Radio program Nichijou no Radio theme song
2011-07-06	Nano Shinonome (Shizuka Furuya)	"Nano no Neji Mawashi Rhapsody" (なののネジ回しラプソディ)	Nichijou Character Song 1 - Shinonome Nano (single)	Lantis	Kenichi Maeyamada	Kenichi Maeyamada	Kenichi Maeyamada	Nano Shinonome character song from anime Nichijou
2011-07-06	Nano Shinonome (Shizuka Furuya)	"Nano no Ohirune Osentaku" (なののおひるねおせんたく)	Nichijou Character Song 1 - Shinonome Nano (single)	Lantis	Kenichi Maeyamada	Kenichi Maeyamada	Kenichi Maeyamada	Nano Shinonome character song from anime Nichijou
2011-07-06	Hakase (Hiromi Konno)	"Hakase no Suki Nano Nano" (はかせの好きなのなの)	Nichijou Character Song 2 - Hakase (single)	Lantis	Kenichi Maeyamada	Kenichi Maeyamada	Kenichi Maeyamada	Hakase character song from anime Nichijou
2011-07-06	Hakase (Hiromi Konno)	"Hakase no Same to Inu" (はかせのサメといぬ)	Nichijou Character Song 2 - Hakase (single)	Lantis	Kenichi Maeyamada	Kenichi Maeyamada	Kenichi Maeyamada	Hakase character song from anime Nichijou
2011-07-06	Sakamoto (Minoru Shiraishi)	"Sakamoto-san no Nyaa to Iu to demo Omotta ka" (阪本のニャーというとでも思ったか)	Nichijou Character Song 3 - Sakamoto-san (single)	Lantis	Kenichi Maeyamada	Kenichi Maeyamada	Yusuke Itagaki	Sakamoto character song from anime Nichijou
2011-07-06	Sakamoto (Minoru Shiraishi)	"Sakamoto-san no Neko Jealousy" (阪本のねこじゃらし)	Nichijou Character Song 3 - Sakamoto-san (single)	Lantis	Kenichi Maeyamada	Kenichi Maeyamada	Yusuke Itagaki	Sakamoto character song from anime Nichijou
2011-07-27	Ryoko Shintani	"Nani ga Nani de Nani na no..." (ナニがナニでナニなの・・・)	Nani ga Nani de Nani na no... (album)	King Records	Kenichi Maeyamada	Kenichi Maeyamada	Kenichi Maeyamada	Anime Katte ni Kaizou ending theme song
2011-08-10	Mio Naganohara (Mai Aizawa)	"Mio no Kaputte Kaputte Moe Chigire" (みおのカプってカプって萌えちぎれ)	Nichijou Character Song 4 - Naganohara Mio (single)	Lantis	Kenichi Maeyamada	Kenichi Maeyamada	Kenichi Maeyamada	Mio Naganohara character song from anime Nichijou; contains guest vocals from Misato Tachibana and Koujirou Sasahara
2011-08-10	Mio Naganohara (Mai Aizawa)	"Yukko wa Hontoni Baka Danaa" (ゆっこはほんとにバカだなあ)	Nichijou Character Song 4 - Naganohara Mio (single)	Lantis	Kenichi Maeyamada	Kenichi Maeyamada	Yoshiaki Fujisawa	Mio Naganohara character song from anime Nichijou
2011-08-10	Yuuko Aioi (Mariko Honda)	"Yukko no Selamat Pagi da yo Jinsei wa" (ゆっこのスラマッパギだよ人生は)	Nichijou Character Song 5 - Aioi Yukko (single)	Lantis	Kenichi Maeyamada	Kenichi Maeyamada	Kenichi Maeyamada	Yuuko Aioi character song from anime Nichijou
2011-08-10	Yuuko Aioi (Mariko Honda)	"Yukko no Gag Hyaku Renpatsu" (ゆっこのギャグ百連発)	Nichijou Character Song 5 - Aioi Yukko (single)	Lantis	Kenichi Maeyamada	Kenichi Maeyamada	Kenichi Maeyamada	Yuuko Aioi character song from anime Nichijou
2011-08-10	Mai Minakami (Misuzu Togashi)	"Mai no Namida no Amida Nyorai" (麻衣の涙の阿弥陀如来)	Nichijou Character Song 6 - Minakami Mai (single)	Lantis	Kenichi Maeyamada	Kenichi Maeyamada	Yusuke Itagaki	Mai Minakami character song from anime Nichijou
2011-08-10	Mai Minakami (Misuzu Togashi)	"Mai no Kakakata Kataomoi-Bon" (麻衣のカカカタ☆カタオモイ-梵)	Nichijou Character Song 6 - Minakami Mai (single)	Lantis	Kenichi Maeyamada	Kenichi Maeyamada	Kenichi Maeyamada	Mai Minakami character song based on "Hyadain no Kakakata Kataomoi-C" from anime Nichijou; contains guest vocals from Kenichi Maeyamada
2011-08-24	Erio Touwa (Asuka Oogame)	"Itoko" (イトコ)	Denpa Onna to Seishun Otoko Character Song Album Volume I (single)	King Records	Franz Maxwell I. (Yoshiaki Fujisawa, Kenichi Maeyamada, Yusuke Itagaki)	Franz Maxwell I. (Yoshiaki Fujisawa, Kenichi Maeyamada, Yusuke Itagaki)	Franz Maxwell I. (Yoshiaki Fujisawa, Kenichi Maeyamada, Yusuke Itagaki)	Erio Touwa character song from anime Ground Control to Psychoelectric Girl
2011-08-24	Ryuuko Mifune (Emiri Katou)	"Hiruyasumi to Helmet to Doukyuusei" (昼休みとヘルメットと同級生)	Denpa Onna to Seishun Otoko Character Song Album Volume I (single)	King Records	Franz Maxwell I. (Yoshiaki Fujisawa, Kenichi Maeyamada, Yusuke Itagaki)	Franz Maxwell I. (Yoshiaki Fujisawa, Kenichi Maeyamada, Yusuke Itagaki)	Franz Maxwell I. (Yoshiaki Fujisawa, Kenichi Maeyamada, Yusuke Itagaki)	Ryuuko Mifune character song from anime Ground Control to Psychoelectric Girl
2011-08-24	Maekawa (Mai Fuchigami)	"Kibonengu Deko no na de" (キボネング・デコの名で)	Denpa Onna to Seishun Otoko Character Song Album Volume I (single)	King Records	Franz Maxwell I. (Yoshiaki Fujisawa, Kenichi Maeyamada, Yusuke Itagaki)	Franz Maxwell I. (Yoshiaki Fujisawa, Kenichi Maeyamada, Yusuke Itagaki)	Franz Maxwell I. (Yoshiaki Fujisawa, Kenichi Maeyamada, Yusuke Itagaki)	Maekawa character song from anime Ground Control to Psychoelectric Girl
2011-09-07	Koujirou Sasahara (Yoshihisa Kawahara)	"Sasahara no Kojirou Polka" (笹原のコジロウポルカ)	Nichijou Character Song 7 - Sasahara Koujirou (single)	Lantis	Kenichi Maeyamada	Kenichi Maeyamada	Yoshiaki Fujisawa	Koujirou Sasahara character song from anime Nichijou)
2011-09-07	Koujirou Sasahara (Yoshihisa Kawahara)	"Sasahara no Sakura Mau Tokisada" (笹原の桜舞う時定)	Nichijou Character Song 7 - Sasahara Koujirou (single)	Lantis	Kenichi Maeyamada	Kenichi Maeyamada	Kenichi Maeyamada	Koujirou Sasahara character song from anime Nichijou
2011-09-07	Misato Tachibana (Chika Horikawa)	"Misato no Gakkou Seikatsu wa Bakuhatsu da!!" (みさとの学校生活は爆発だっ!!)	Nichijou Character Song 8 - Tachibana Misato (single)	Lantis	Kenichi Maeyamada	Kenichi Maeyamada	Kenichi Maeyamada	Misato Tachibana character song from anime Nichijou
2011-09-07	Misato Tachibana (Chika Horikawa)	"Misato no Oshiete Fecchan Weboshii" (みさとの教えてフェっちゃんウェボシー)	Nichijou Character Song 8 - Tachibana Misato (single)	Lantis	Kenichi Maeyamada	Kenichi Maeyamada	Kenichi Maeyamada	Misato Tachibana character song from anime Nichijou
2011-09-22	Mitsuba Marui (Ayahi Takagaki), Futaba Marui (Satomi Akesaka), Hitoha Marui (Haruka Tomatsu)	"Masaka Sanransei!?" (まさか三卵性!?)	Masaka Sanransei!? (single); Mitsudomobest (album)	Lantis	Kenichi Maeyamada	Shunryu	Kenichi Maeyamada	Internet radio show Mitsudomoe Radio "3-Channel"" opening theme song
2011-09-22	Yabecchi (Hiro Shimono), Futaba Marui (Satomi Akesaka)	"Sensei wa Kodomo, Kodomo wa Sensei" (先生はこども?子供はせんせい?)	Masaka Sanransei!? (single)	Lantis	Kenichi Maeyamada	Kenichi Maeyamada	Kenichi Maeyamada	First appeared in episode 13 of Mitsudomoe; song for internet radio show Mitsudomoe Radio "3-Channel"
2011-10-26	Annaka-san (Kaori Sadohara)	"Annaka no Pyon!Pyon!Ee!!" (安中のぴょん!ぴょん!エー!!)	Nichijou Character Song Sono 9 Last 5 Persons (single)	Lantis	Kenichi Maeyamada	Kenichi Maeyamada	Kenichi Maeyamada	Annaka-san character song from anime Nichijou; lyrics contain only the words "pyon" and "ee"
2011-10-26	Yuria Sekiguchi (Ai Hirosaka)	"Sekiguchi Yuria no Senpai to Igo Soccer-bu" (関口ユリアの先輩と囲碁サッカー部)	Nichijou Character Song Sono 9 Last 5 Persons (single)	Lantis	Kenichi Maeyamada	Kenichi Maeyamada	Kenichi Maeyamada	Yuria Sekiguchi character song from anime Nichijou
2011-10-26	Sakurai-sensei (Mami Kosuge)	"Sakurai-sensei no Dokidoki Seito Shidou" (桜井先生のドキドキ生徒指導)	Nichijou Character Song Sono 9 Last 5 Persons (single)	Lantis	Kenichi Maeyamada	Kenichi Maeyamada	Kenichi Maeyamada	Sakurai-sensei character song from anime Nichijou
2011-10-26	Nakamura-sensei (Kaoru Mizuhara)	"Nakamura-sensei no Kagaku no Na no Moto Ni!" (中村先生の科学の名のもとに!)	Nichijou Character Song Sono 9 Last 5 Persons (single)	Lantis	Kenichi Maeyamada	Kenichi Maeyamada	Kenichi Maeyamada	Nakamura-sensei character song from anime Nichijou
2011-10-26	Kouchou-sensei (Cho)	"Kouchou no Cho Cho Kouchou" (校長のチョーチョー校長)	Nichijou Character Song Sono 9 Last 5 Persons (single)	Lantis	Kenichi Maeyamada	Kenichi Maeyamada	Kenichi Maeyamada	Kouchou-sensei character song from anime Nichijou
2011-12-14	Ryoko Shintani	"Hajimete, Dakara..." (初めて、だから...)	OVA Katte ni Kaizou Concept Album Super DX Chougoukin (album)	King Records	Kenichi Maeyamada	Kenichi Maeyamada	Kenichi Maeyamada	Song from anime Katte ni Kaizou
2011-12-21	Meme Touwa (Ai Nonaka)	"Eien no 39-sai Damo~n" (永遠の39歳だもーん☆)	Denpa Onna to Seishun Otoko Character Song Album Volume II (single)	King Records	Franz Maxwell I. (Yoshiaki Fujisawa, Kenichi Maeyamada, Yusuke Itagaki)	Franz Maxwell I. (Yoshiaki Fujisawa, Kenichi Maeyamada, Yusuke Itagaki)	Franz Maxwell I. (Yoshiaki Fujisawa, Kenichi Maeyamada, Yusuke Itagaki)	Meme Touwa character song from anime Ground Control to Psychoelectric Girl
2011-12-21	Yashiro Hoshimiya (Yuka Iguchi)	"Tsuyoku Negae Tsuyoku Hanate" (ツヨクネガエ ツヨクハナテ)	Denpa Onna to Seishun Otoko Character Song Album Volume II (single)		Franz Maxwell I. (Yoshiaki Fujisawa, Kenichi Maeyamada, Yusuke Itagaki)	Franz Maxwell I. (Yoshiaki Fujisawa, Kenichi Maeyamada, Yusuke Itagaki)	Franz Maxwell I. (Yoshiaki Fujisawa, Kenichi Maeyamada, Yusuke Itagaki)	Yashiro Hoshimiya character song from anime Ground Control to Psychoelectric Girl
2011-12-21	Maekawa (Mai Fuchigami), Erio Touwa (Asuka Oogame), Ryuuko Mifune (Emiri Katou)	"Niwa-kun, Sunawachi Tenkousei, Arui wa Itoko" (にわ君、すなわち転校生、あるいはイトコ)	Denpa Onna to Seishun Otoko Character Song Album Volume II (single)		Franz Maxwell I. (Yoshiaki Fujisawa, Kenichi Maeyamada, Yusuke Itagaki)	Franz Maxwell I. (Yoshiaki Fujisawa, Kenichi Maeyamada, Yusuke Itagaki)	Franz Maxwell I. (Yoshiaki Fujisawa, Kenichi Maeyamada, Yusuke Itagaki)	From anime Ground Control to Psychoelectric Girl
2012-05-23	Neris Filiam (Mai Aizawa), Amil Manaflare (Kanae Itou), Airy Ardet (Shiori Mikami)	"Tokisekai" (時世界 〜トキセカイ〜)	Tokisekai / Fuwaffuwa no Mahou (single)	Avex Entertainment	Kenichi Maeyamada	Kenichi Maeyamada	Kenichi Maeyamada	Anime Shining Hearts: Shiawase no Pan opening theme song; direction by Kenichi Maeyamada; Oricon number 46 single
2012-05-23	Neris Filiam (Mai Aizawa), Amil Manaflare (Kanae Itou), Airy Ardet (Shiori Mikami)	"Fuwaffuwa no Mahou" (ふわっふわのまほう)	Tokisekai / Fuwaffuwa no Mahou (single)	Avex Entertainment	Kenichi Maeyamada	Kenichi Maeyamada	Kenichi Maeyamada	Anime Shining Hearts: Shiawase no Pan ending theme song; direction by Kenichi Maeyamada
2013-01-09	Megumi Han, Mariya Ise, Aya Hirano	"Nagareboshi Kirari" (流れ星☆キラリ)	REASON (single)	SENHA&Co.	Yujin Kitagawa, Koji Iwasawa	Yujin Kitagawa	Kenichi Maeyamada, Yuzu	Anime Hunter × Hunter ending theme song sung by characters
2013-03-27	Sasami Tsukuyomi (Kana Asumi)	"Shintouatsu Symphony" (浸透圧シンフォニー)	Sasami-san@Ganbaranai Original Soundtrack (album)	Lantis	Kenichi Maeyamada	Kenichi Maeyamada	Kenichi Maeyamada	Anime Sasami-san@Ganbaranai ending theme song
2013-06-19	Hinata Miyakawa (Maina Shimagata), Hikage Miyakawa (Makoto Kawasaki)	"MAKEGUMI"	MAKEGUMI (single)	Lantis	Kenichi Maeyamada	Kenichi Maeyamada	Kenichi Maeyamada	Web anime Miyakawa-ke no Kuufuku ending theme song
2013-06-19	Hinata Miyakawa (Maina Shimagata), Hikage Miyakawa (Makoto Kawasaki)	"☆ ni Negai wo" (☆に願いを)	MAKEGUMI (single)	Lantis	Kenichi Maeyamada	Kenichi Maeyamada	Kenichi Maeyamada	From web anime Miyakawa-ke no Kuufuku
2013-07-31	Konata Izumi (Aya Hirano), Kagami Hiiragi (Emiri Katou)	"KACHIGUMI"	KACHIGUMI (single)	Lantis	Kenichi Maeyamada	Kenichi Maeyamada	Kenichi Maeyamada	Web anime Miyakawa-ke no Kuufuku opening theme song
2013-07-31	Akira Kogami (Hiromi Konno)	"Yosouji Touge" (四十路峠)	KACHIGUMI (single)	Lantis	Kenichi Maeyamada	Kenichi Maeyamada	Kenichi Maeyamada	From web anime Miyakawa-ke no Kuufuku
2014-02-19	Shio Ogura (Shiori Mutou), Newton (Yuu Asakawa), Galileo (Sumire Uesaka)	"Chiisana Hoshi ver.α" (ちいさな星 ver.α)	Nobunagun Original Soundtrack (album)	Vap	Rie Otsuka	Kenichi Maeyamada	Shingo Yamazaki	Anime Nobunagun ending theme song
2014-02-19	Shio Ogura (Shiori Mutou), Geronimo (Chiwa Saito), Cyx (Mutsumi Tamura), Gaudi (Ayumu Murase)	"Chiisana Hoshi ver.β" (ちいさな星 ver.β)	Nobunagun Original Soundtrack (album)	Vap	Rie Otsuka	Kenichi Maeyamada	Hideyuki "Daichi" Suzuki	Anime Nobunagun ending theme song
2014-07-23	Gummibär & Gachapin・Mukku	"Oyatsu Ii Yatsu Sugoi Yatsu" (おやついいやつすごいやつ)	Oyatsu Ii Yatsu Sugoi Yatsu (single)	Avex Trax	Kenichi Maeyamada	Kenichi Maeyamada	Kenichi Maeyamada	Collaboration between Gummibär and Gachapin; produced by Kenichi Maeyamada (Gummibär & Gachapin)
2014-07-23	Gummibär	"Boku wa Gummy Bear" (ぼくはグミベア)	Oyatsu Ii Yatsu Sugoi Yatsu (single)	Avex Trax	Kenichi Maeyamada	Christian Schneider	Christian Schneider	Japanese version of "I'm a Gummy Bear" (Gummibär )
2014-10-29	Daisuke Ono	"Welcome!! DISCO Kemokemoke" (Welcome!! DISCOけもけもけ)	Welcome!! DISCO Kemokemoke (single)	KADOKAWA Media Factory	Kenichi Maeyamada	Kenichi Maeyamada	Kenichi Maeyamada	Anime Gugure! Kokkuri-san opening theme song
2016-08-03	Shinnosuke Nohara (Akiko Yajima)	"Ora wa Ninkimono 25thMIX" (オラはにんきもの 25thMIX)	Ora wa Ninkimono 25thMIX (single)	TV Asahi Music Co.	Reo Rinozuka	Yasuo Kosugi	Kenichi Maeyamada	25th Anniversary version of anime Crayon Shin-chan opening theme song; uses vocals from the original recording by Akiko Yajima
2016-08-10	Cure Miracle (Rie Takahashi), Cure Magical (Yui Horie), Cure Felice (Saori Hayami)	"Mahou a La Domo!" (魔法アラ・ドーモ！)	Dokkin Mahoutsukai Precure! Part2 / Mahou à La Domo! (single); Mahou Tsukai Pretty Cure! Vocal Best A Gift From Our Hands (album)	Marvelous	Natsumi Tadano	Kenichi Maeyamada	Yoshihiro Saito	Anime Witchy PreCure! ending theme song; Oricon number 22 single
2016-08-24	Yuki Kurihara (Ai Kakuma), Shinya Momotsuki (Nobuhiko Okamoto)	"Daisuki da yo Daisuki da yo Umaretekuretekite Arigatou" (大好きだよ 大好きだよ生まれてきて ありがとう)	Daisuki da yo Daisuki da yo Umaretekurete Arigatou (single)	Lantis	Kenichi Maeyamada	Kenichi Maeyamada	Kenichi Maeyamada	Anime Momokuri opening theme song
2017-02-22	Gabriel (Miyu Tomita), Vignette (Saori Oonishi), Satanya (Naomi Ohzora), Raphiel (Kana Hanazawa)	"Gabriel DropKick" (ガヴリールドロップキック)	Gabriel DropKick (single)	KADOKAWA	Kenichi Maeyamada	Kenichi Maeyamada	Kenichi Maeyamada	Anime Gabriel DropOut opening theme song; Oricon number 25 single
2018-01-24	STARTails☆	"Yuuyake to Issho ni" (夕焼けといっしょに)	ne! ne! ne! (single)	Aniplex	Yuho Iwasato	Kenichi Maeyamada	Miyoshi Keita	Anime Slow Start ending theme song
2018-09-29	BLACK STARS	"Touhonseisou Koushinkyoku" (東奔西走行進曲)	Touhonseisou Koushinkyoku (single)	Pony Canyon	Kanata Nakamura	Kenichi Maeyamada	Yashikin	From anime film Kaiju Girls Black
2019-04-10	Albedo (Yumi Hara), Aqua (Sora Amamiya), Emilia (Rie Takahashi ), Tanya von Degurechaff (Aoi Yuuki)	"Isekai Girls Talk" (異世界ガールズトーク)	Isekai Quartet / Isekai Girls Talk (single)	KADOKAWA	Kagura.A	Kenichi Maeyamada	Keita Miyoshi	Anime Isekai Quartet ending theme song; Oricon number 34 single
2019-07-06	Shinnosuke Nohara (Yumiko Kobayashi)	"Ora wa Ninkimono 2019MIX" (オラはにんきもの 2019MIX)	Ora wa Ninkimono 2019MIX (single)	TV Asahi Music Co.	Reo Rinozuka	Yasuo Kosugi	Kenichi Maeyamada	2019 version of anime Crayon Shin-chan opening theme song; contains new vocals from Yumiko Kobayashi
2019-11-06	Junya Uehara (Natsuki Hanae)	"GETUP! GETLIVE!"	GETUP! GETLIVE! Steam Rising (album)	BANDAI NAMCO Arts Inc.	Kenichi Maeyamada	Kenichi Maeyamada	Yusuke Itagaki	Anime GETUP! GETLIVE! ending theme song
2020-10-28	Chizuru Mizuhara (Sora Amamiya)	"DATE"	Rent a Girlfriend Original Character Song & Original Soundtrack CD [vol.1] (album)	DMM pictures	Reiji Miyajima, Kenichi Maeyamada	Kenichi Maeyamada	Yusuke Itagaki	Chizuru Mizuhara character song from anime Rent-A-Girlfriend
2020-10-28	Chizuru Mizuhara (Sora Amamiya)	"Favorite Lover -Chizuru Mizuhara Solo ver.-" (Favorite Lover -水原千鶴 solo ver.-)	Rent a Girlfriend Original Character Song & Original Soundtrack CD [vol.1] (album)	DMM pictures	Reiji Miyajima, Kenichi Maeyamada	Kenichi Maeyamada	Yusuke Itagaki	Chizuru Mizuhara character song from anime Rent-A-Girlfriend
2020-11-25	Mami Nanami (Aoi Yuuki)	"Mami Rap" (まみラップ)	Rent a Girlfriend Original Character Song & Original Soundtrack CD [vol.2] (album)	DMM pictures	Reiji Miyajima, Kenichi Maeyamada	Kenichi Maeyamada	Tomoyuki Otake	Mami Nanami character song from anime Rent-A-Girlfriend
2020-11-25	Mami Nanami (Aoi Yuuki)	"Favorite Lover -Mami Nanami Solo ver.-" (Favorite Lover -七海麻美 solo ver.-)	Rent a Girlfriend Original Character Song & Original Soundtrack CD [vol.2] (album)	DMM pictures	Reiji Miyajima, Kenichi Maeyamada	Kenichi Maeyamada	Yusuke Itagaki	Mami Nanami character song from anime Rent-A-Girlfriend
2020-12-23	Ruka Sarashina (Nao Toyama)	"Kanojo Sengen" (彼女宣言)	Rent a Girlfriend Original Character Song & Original Soundtrack CD [vol.3] (album)	DMM pictures	Reiji Miyajima, Kenichi Maeyamada	Kenichi Maeyamada	Keita Miyoshi	Ruka Sarashina character song from anime Rent-A-Girlfriend
2020-12-23	Ruka Sarashina (Nao Toyama)	"Favorite Lover -Ruka Sarashina Solo ver.-" (Favorite Lover -更科瑠夏 solo ver.-)	Rent a Girlfriend Original Character Song & Original Soundtrack CD [vol.3] (album)	DMM pictures	Reiji Miyajima, Kenichi Maeyamada	Kenichi Maeyamada	Yusuke Itagaki	Ruka Sarashina character song from anime Rent-A-Girlfriend
2021-01-27	Sumi Sakurasawa (Rie Takahashi)	"sakura selfish"	Rent a Girlfriend Original Character Song & Original Soundtrack CD [vol.4] (album)	DMM pictures	Reiji Miyajima, Kenichi Maeyamada	Kenichi Maeyamada	Tomoyuki Otake	Sumi Sakurasawa character song from anime Rent-A-Girlfriend
2021-01-27	Sumi Sakurasawa (Rie Takahashi)	"Favorite Lover -Sumi Sakurasawa Solo ver.-" (Favorite Lover -桜沢墨 solo ver.-)	Rent a Girlfriend Original Character Song & Original Soundtrack CD [vol.4] (album)	DMM pictures	Reiji Miyajima, Kenichi Maeyamada	Kenichi Maeyamada	Yusuke Itagaki	Sumi Sakurasawa character song from anime Rent-A-Girlfriend
2021-02-24	Happy Around!	"Guruguru DJ TURN!!" (ぐるぐるDJ TURN!!)	Guruguru DJ TURN!! (single)		Kou Nakamura	Kenichi Maeyamada	PandaBoY	Anime D4DJ First Mix opening theme song
2021-09-15	Stardust, Kikuichimonji, 6, Hayashima	"OWARAI BANZAI"	Drama CD2「GETUP! GETLIVE! For seasoning」 (album)	BANDAI NAMCO Arts Inc.	Kenichi Maeyamada	Kenichi Maeyamada	Yusuke Itagaki	Anime GETUP! GETLIVE! theme song
2021	Hololive 3rd Generation	"Oishii Oniku ga Tabetai no!" (美味しいお肉が食べたいの！)	—	—	Kenichi Maeyamada	Kenichi Maeyamada	Mitsuki Tokuda	Premiered at HOLOLIVE FANTASY 1st LIVE FAN FUN ISLAND

=== Game Works ===
Release date	Artist	Title	Album	Label	Lyricist	Composer	Arranger	Notes
2010-01-27	Konata Izumi (Aya Hirano), Kagami Hiiragi (Emiri Katou), Tsukasa Hiiragi (Kaori Fukuhara), Miyuki Takara (Aya Endo)	"Na・Ri・A・Ga・Ri" (な・り・あ・が・り☆)	Na・Ri・A・Ga・Ri (single)	Lantis	Aki Hata	Kenichi Maeyamada	Kenichi Maeyamada	Game Lucky Star: Net Idol Meister opening theme song; Oricon number 35 single
2010-01-27	Konata Izumi (Aya Hirano), Kagami Hiiragi (Emiri Katou), Tsukasa Hiiragi (Kaori Fukuhara), Miyuki Takara (Aya Endo)	"Nande Datakke Idol?" ( なんでだったっけアイドル?)	Na・Ri・A・Ga・Ri (single)	Lantis	Aki Hata	Kenichi Maeyamada	Kenichi Maeyamada	Game Lucky Star: Net Idol Meister ending theme song
2011-04-06	Suzumiya Haruhi-chan (Aya Hirano), Yuki Nagato (Minori Chihara), Mikuru Asahina (Yuuko Gotou)	"Rakuraku Zenshudou Kuukan" (らくらく全手動空間)	Rakuraku Zenshudou Kuukan / Asobi no Manabi no Shizukesa no (single)	Lantis	Aki Hata	Kenichi Maeyamada	Kenichi Maeyamada	PSP game Suzumiya Haruhi-chan no Mahjong theme song
2013-06-26	Hibiki Ganaha (Manami Numakura)	"Rebellion"	THE IDOLM@STER LIVE THE@TER PERFORMANCE 03 (album)	Lantis	ZAQ	Kenichi Maeyamada	Kentaro Ishii	Game THE IDOLM@STER MILLION LIVE! Hibiki Ganaha image song
2014-11-26	Momoko Suou (Keiko Watanabe)	"MY STYLE! OUR STYLE!!!!"	THE IDOLM@STER LIVE THE@TER HARMONY 05 (album)	Lantis	Kenichi Maeyamada	Kenichi Maeyamada	Yusuke Itagaki	Game THE IDOLM@STER MILLION LIVE! Momoko Suou image song
2016-11-23	Ryuseitai	"Goshiki no Shooting Star!!!!!" (五色のShooting☆Star!!!!!)	Ensemble Stars! Unit Song CD Vol.5 RYUSEITAI (single)	Frontier Works	Kenichi Maeyamada	Kenichi Maeyamada	Yoshihiro Saito	From game Ensemble Stars!
2017-12-06	Umi Kousaka (Reina Ueda)	"Sports! Sports! Sports!" (スポーツ！ スポーツ！ スポーツ！)	THE IDOLM@STER MILLION LIVE! M@STER SPARKLE 04 (album)	Lantis	Kenichi Maeyamada	Kenichi Maeyamada	Yoshihiro Saito	Game THE IDOLM@STER MILLION LIVE! Umi Kousaka image song
2018-03-07	Shinobu Sengoku (Anju Nitta)	"Shippuu Jinrai Shinobi Michi" (疾風迅雷 忍び道)	ENSEMBLE STARS! ALBUM SERIES PRESENT -RYUSEITAI- (album)	Frontier Works	Kenichi Maeyamada	Kenichi Maeyamada	Yoshihiro Saito	From game Ensemble Stars!
2018-11-07	Phantasic QM	"Cheerful Smiling"	Phantasic QM Mini Album for Phantasic 3D LIVE 2018 (album)	Frontier Works	Shinichiro Yamashita	Kenichi Maeyamada	Satoshi Watanabe	Game Phantasy Star Online 2 character song
2019-06-26	7EVENDAYS⇔HOLIDAYS	"Mendo~i! Yahho~i! Tomodachi!" (めんどーい! やっほーい! ともだち!)	ONGEKI Vocal Collection 4 (single)	KADOKAWA	Kenichi Maeyamada	Kenichi Maeyamada	Kenichi Maeyamada	From game O.N.G.E.K.I.
2021-09-15	Naomi Tamura and Tomohiro Hatano	"Kenzan! Pokemon Mezastar! Super Tag!" (見参！ポケモンメザスタ！スーパータッグ)	—	—	Kenichi Maeyamada	Kenichi Maeyamada	Mitsuru	Game Pokémon Mezastar Super Tag series theme song
2021-12-23	SUNDAY (Aoi Yuuki)	"Kokuhaku Fountain" (告白ファウンテン)	—	—	Aoi Yuuki	Kenichi Maeyamada	Tota Fujiwara	YUKI x AOI Chimera Project
2022-06-30	Hello, Happy World!	"Happy! Happier! Happiest!"	Happy! Happier! Happiest! (single)	Bushiroad Music	Kenichi Maeyamada	Kenichi Maeyamada	Tota Fujiwara	Produced by Kenichi Maeyamada (BanG Dream!)
2022-09-28	Smart Falcon (Hitomi Owada)	"Tachiichi Zero-ban! Juni wa Ichiban!" (立ち位置ゼロ番！順位は一番！)	WINNING LIVE 08 (album)	Lantis	Kenichi Maeyamada	Kenichi Maeyamada	Keita Miyoshi	From game Umamusume: Pretty Derby
2022-11-09	YYY	"Waai WaiWai WaiWaiWai!" (わーいわいわい わいわいわい！)	Waai WaiWai WaiWaiWai! (single)	Lantis	Kenichi Maeyamada	Kenichi Maeyamada	Tota Fujiwara	Radio show Uranohoshi Girls' High School RADIO!! theme song; subunit made up of You Watanabe (Shuka Saito), Yoshiko Tsushima (Aika Kobayashi), and Ruby Kurosawa (Ai Furihata); Oricon number 12 single (Love Live! Sunshine!! Aqours Uranohoshi Girls' High School RADIO!!)
2023-01-09	Nobuo Uematsu / Masayoshi Soken	"Forged in Crimson"	Final Fantasy XIV: Endwalker Patch 6.3: Gods Revel, Lands Tremble		Takashi Tokita		Kenichi Maeyamada	For the Trial added in Patch 6.3; "Mount Ordeals"

== Music director ==
Year	Title	Type	Notes
2010	Mu~Comi Plus	Radio show	Created opening theme, jingles.
2011	Denpa Onna to Seishun Otoko	Anime	Created incidental music as a part of the unit Franz Maxwell I, featuring Yoshiaki Fujisawa, Yūsuke Itagaki and Maeyama. This includes three character songs included on the third DVD: "Itoko" (イトコ; "Cousin") by Erio Tōwa (Asuka Ōgame), "Hiruyasumi to Helmet to Dōkyūsei" (昼休みとヘルメットと同級生; "Lunch Break and a Helmet and My Classmates") by Ryūko Mifune (Emiri Katō) and "Hiruyasumi to Helmet to Dōkyūsei" (キボネング・デコの名で; "With the name Kiboneng Deco") by Maekawa (Mai Fuchigami).
2012	Million Diffusion Arthur	iPhone app	Square Soft game for iOS. Produced background music, theme song.
2012	The Nutty Radio Show Onitama	Radio show	FM NACK5 radio show, created jingles.
2012	Grandpa Danger	OVA anime	OVA anime version, released on July 27, 2012, and November 22, 2012. Produced background music, theme song.
2012	NHK Educational TV Rekishi ni Dokiri	TV show	Features songs about historical figures such as Tokugawa Ieyasu, sung and danced to by Nakamura Shidō II.
2013	Miyakawa-ke no Kūfuku	Web anime	Produced background music, theme songs.
2013	Fuji TV Kubominehyada Kojirase Night	TV show	Talk variety show. Includes comical songs such as "Setsubu n Onippoi" (SETSUBU・ん...鬼っぽい) sung by Maasa Takahashi, and "Ōgata Renkyū ni Hatarakitakunai Kimi mo Suki da yo" (大型連休に働きたくない君も好きだよ; "I Like You Too, Person Who Doesn't Wanna Work on the Long Holidays") sung in a duet with Motoya Nakamura & Maasa Takahashi. Lyrics are written by Kubominehyada, a collaboration between Mitsurō Kubo, Mineko Nōmachi and Maeyama.
2014	Waratte Iitomo! Grand Finale	TV show	Produced background music and commercial music for the grand finale show of the Fuji TV program, aired on March 31, 2014.
2014	Princess Jellyfish	Film	Produced background music.
2020	Rent-A-Girlfriend	Anime	Produced background music, and ending theme song "Kokuhaku Bungee Jump" (告白バンジージャンプ) performed by Halca.
2023	Yomawari Neko	Anime	Produced background music
TBA	Kusunoki's Flunking Her High School Glow-Up	Anime	Produced background music
