= List of Yuri on Ice episodes =

The cover of the first Yuri on Ice home video release volume

Yuri on Ice (ユーリ!!! on ICE) is a Japanese sports anime television series about figure skating. It was produced by MAPPA, directed by Sayo Yamamoto and written by Mitsurou Kubo. The character designs were by Tadashi Hiramatsu, and the music was composed by Taro Umebayashi and Taku Matsushiba. The figure skating choreography was by Kenji Miyamoto. The series revolves around the relationships between Japanese figure skater Yuri Katsuki, also known as Yuri K., his idol, Russian figure-skating champion Victor Nikiforov, and up-and-coming Russian skater Yuri Plisetsky, also known as Yuri P.; as Yuri K. and Yuri P. take part in the Figure Skating Grand Prix, with Victor acting as coach to Yuri K.

The series first premiered on TV Asahi on October 6, 2016, and finished airing on December 22, 2016, with a total of 12 episodes. The series was made available for streaming by Crunchyroll shortly after its broadcast in Japan, and then Funimation provided an English dub of the series, starting on October 24, 2016. In April 2017, it was announced that Yuri on Ice would return with a film featuring an original story.

The opening theme is "History Maker" by Dean Fujioka. The ending theme is "You Only Live Once" by Wataru Hatano. The Japanese release of Yuri on Ice had six Blu-ray/DVD sets; the first set was released on December 30, 2016. On February 6, 2018, Funimation released the series in the US on a combined DVD and Blu-Ray boxset. This set was released in the UK by Sony Pictures Home Entertainment on October 8, 2018.

== Broadcast and distribution ==
Yuri on Ice aired on TV Asahi from October 6 to December 22, 2016. The anime was produced by MAPPA, directed by Sayo Yamamoto and written by Mitsurou Kubo, with character design by Tadashi Hiramatsu, music by Taro Umebayashi and Taku Matsushiba and figure-skating choreography by Kenji Miyamoto. The episodes were made available for streaming by Crunchyroll, and Funimation began streaming an English dub on October 24, 2016.

Yuri on Ice had six Blu-ray and DVD sets released in Japan. The first set, containing the first two episodes, was released on December 30, 2016. Each set included bonus content such as booklets, production audio commentary and costume-design and choreography videos. On February 6, 2018, Funimation released the series in the US on a combined DVD and Blu-Ray boxset, with extras including textless opening and closing title sequences, trailers, commentary from the 11th episode, and the "Welcome to the Madness" original video anime. There is also a limited-edition version including a chipboard collector's box with "cracked ice" holographic finish and silver foil, three art cards, and an 80-page book of illustrations and behind-the-scenes interviews with Sayo Yamamoto, Mitsurou Kubo, and Kenji Miyamoto. The Blu-ray/DVD set was released in the UK by Sony Pictures Home Entertainment on October 8, 2018.

The compilation CD Oh! SkaTra! Yuri on Ice (Oh! スケトラ!!! ユーリ!!! on ICE), with the anime's 24 original songs, was released on December 21, 2016. The insert song "Yuri on Ice" was included in Piano Solo Chū Jōkyū Figure Skate Meikyoku-shū: Hyōyō ni Hibiku Melody 2016–2017, a piano book released on January 21, 2017, with music used by figure skaters (including Mao Asada and Yuzuru Hanyu). It was the only anime song in the music book release.

== Episodes ==
=== Television series ===
| No. | English title (Note: All English titles are taken from Crunchyroll.) Original Japanese title | Directed by | Original release date | Ref. |
|---|---|---|---|---|
| 1 | "Easy as Pirozhki!! The Grand Prix Final of Tears"; Transliteration: "Nan no Piroshiki!! Namida no Guranpuri Fainaru" (Japanese: なんのピロシキ!! 涙のグランプリファイナル) | Jun Shishido | October 6, 2016 | |
Yuri Katsuki finishes in last place at his first Grand Prix Final. Depressed by his string of losses, he unofficially retires. Having just graduated from college, he returns home to his family's hot springs resort, Yu-topia, in Hasetsu, Kyushu, after being away for five years. As skating legend Victor Nikiforov wins his fifth consecutive World Championship, Yuri practices Victor's routine to reignite his passion. His performance is secretly recorded and uploaded to the internet by his friend Yuko Nishigori's triplet daughters, and the video goes viral. After watching it, Victor travels to Japan and announces to Yuri that he wishes to become his coach and help him win the next Grand Prix series.
| 2 | "Two Yuris?! Drama at Yu-topia"; Transliteration: "Futari no Yūri!? Yūtopia no Ran" (Japanese: ２人のユーリ！？ ゆ～とぴあの乱) | Takashi Igari | October 13, 2016 | |
Victor's abrupt departure to Japan upsets his coach Yakov, who disapproves of him taking a season off from his skating career. Victor lives with Yuri and prepares a training regimen for him to get back into shape. He reveals his location by posting a photo on his Instagram account, which causes a media uproar. 15-year-old star skater Yuri Plisetsky goes to Japan to make Victor follow through on the promise he made to choreograph a program for his senior debut. To choose who Victor will coach, he makes both Yuri K. and Yuri P. compete in a skate-off. If Yuri P. wins, Victor will return to Russia to train him, and if Yuri K. wins, Victor will remain in Japan.
| 3 | "I Am Eros, and Eros is Me?! Face-Off! Hot Springs on Ice"; Transliteration: "Boku ga Erosu de Erosu ga Boku de!? Taiketsu! Onsen on Ice" (Japanese: 僕がエロスでエロスが僕で！？ 対決！温泉on ice) | Akitsugu Hisagi | October 20, 2016 | |
Victor assigns choreography opposite to what Yuri P. and Yuri K. are used to, challenging them – Yuri P. gets an agape love theme and Yuri K. gets an eros theme. Both Yuri K. and Yuri P. struggle with their performances. Later, Yuri P. uses his love for his grandfather to channel his agape while Yuri K. attempts to use his favorite food, katsudon, to channel eros. At the last minute, Yuri K. decides to be more feminine in his movements, feeling it suits him better than a masculine role for his eros program. On the day of the event, Yuri P. becomes too emotionally flustered to convey agape while Yuri K performs more confidently although he is not able to cleanly land one of his jumps. In the end, a downhearted Yuri P. leaves for Russia as Yuri K. is declared winner. Both Yuri K. and Yuri P. vow to win the upcoming Grand Prix series.
| 4 | "Like Yourself... And Complete The Free Program!!"; Transliteration: "Jibun o Suki ni Natte...Kansei!! Furī Puroguramu" (Japanese: 自分を好きになって…完成!!フリープログラム) | Nobuyoshi Arai | October 27, 2016 | |
In Russia, Yuri P. becomes more diligent at practicing, humbled by his loss in Japan. Noticing this, Yakov asks former prima ballerina, Lilia Baranovskaya, to choreograph his free program and teach him ballet. Yuri P. accepts, wanting to take advantage of his abilities before his body matures. Victor puts Yuri K. in charge of picking his own program music; however, Yuri struggles, not confident in his decisions. Feeling ashamed about his shortcomings, Yuri avoids Victor but Victor gives him the confidence to open up more. When the Grand Prix assignments are announced, Yuri K. realizes he must compete in the Japanese Qualifying competitions first since he lost in the Nationals before being eligible for the Grand Prix Final. Yuri titles the music piece his friend composed for him "Yuri on Ice".
| 5 | "Face Beet-Red!! It's the First Competition! The Chugoku, Shikoku, and Kyushu Championship"; Transliteration: "Kao Makka!! Shosen da yo! Chū Shikoku Kyūshū Senshuken Taikai" (Japanese: 顔まっ赤！！初戦だョ！中四国九州選手権大会) | Yūsuke Onoda | November 3, 2016 | |
On the day of the Japan Figure Skating Championships, Yuri K. begins his first competition of the season. Though he does not land all his jumps, he earns a high score. Victor lectures Yuri about his performance getting sloppy, and orders him to lower the jump difficulty. Yuri meets fellow competitor, Kenjirō Minami, a young skater who idolizes him. Remembering Minami beating him at Nationals, he acts aloof toward him. Victor scolds him for being unsupportive of his juniors, making Yuri realize he is making a mistake; he later cheers for Minami. During his free program, Yuri disobeys Victor's orders and changes the jumps, surprising Victor, though he is pleased. Although Yuri still makes mistakes, he earns first place and announces his Grand Prix program theme: "Love," inspired by his feelings about Victor.
| 6 | "China's On! The Grand Prix Series Opening Event!! The Cup of China Short Program"; Transliteration: "Guranpurishirīzu Kaimaku! Yatchaina Chūgoku Taikai!" (Japanese: グランプリシリーズ開幕！やっチャイナ中国大会！ ショートプログラム) | Yasuhiro Geshi | November 10, 2016 | |
In his first Grand Prix assignment, Yuri P. wins second place in the Skate Canada event. In Beijing for Yuri K's first Grand Prix assignment, Victor runs into his coach Yakov, only to be coldly brushed off for taking a season off, and Yuri and Victor meet friends and fellow competitors from around the world, gathered for the Cup of China. Swiss competitor Christophe Giacometti tells Yuri that he should let Victor return to ice skating. After this, Yuri skates his eros program, performing without any mistakes, wanting to prove to the world that he is worthy of Victor's love and attention. He wins first place in the short program, though the other skaters are confident they can close the gap in the free skate.
| 7 | "China's On! The Grand Prix Series Opening Event!! The Cup of China Free Skate"; Transliteration: "Guranpurishirīzu Kaimaku! Yatchaina Chūgoku Taikai! Furī Puroguramu" (Japanese: グランプリシリーズ開幕！やっチャイナ中国大会！フリープログラム) | Hirokazu Yamada | November 17, 2016 | |
Feeling the pressure of everyone's expectations, Yuri K. becomes anxious and distressed, especially as he watches the other skaters in the free program. Victor, not knowing how to motivate Yuri and handle his emotional state, unintentionally makes him cry. Yuri confesses he is nervous because he does not want his mistakes to reflect badly on Victor. He asks Victor to have faith in him. On his turn, Yuri K. performs well, having regained his composure, and changes his last jump to a quadruple flip. Although he does not land it cleanly, he surprises the audience, as this was Victor's signature move, and for pulling it off when his stamina should have been low. Moved by this, Victor spontaneously kisses Yuri on live television. Phichit Chulanont from Thailand wins first place and Yuri K. wins second.
| 8 | "Yuri vs Yuri! The Horror!! Rostelecom Cup, Short Program"; Transliteration: "Yūri vs Yūri! Oso Roshia!! Roshia Taikai Shōto Puroguramu" (Japanese: 勇利VSユーリ！おそロシア！！ロシア大会 ショートプログラム) | Matsuo Asami | November 24, 2016 | |
In Moscow, the Rostelecom Cup event will determine the last four spots among the six skaters left in the competition. Yuri K. skates flawlessly, while Yuri P. performs well, but messes up his first jump as he was bothered by his grandfather's absence and still bitter about Victor being Yuri K.'s coach. In the end, Yuri K. places second and Yuri P. places third in the short program. Yuri K. gets a call from his sister that Victor's poodle, Makkachin, has got buns stuck in his throat and is in critical condition. Yuri remembers how he could not be there when his own dog died and urges Victor to return to Japan. Reluctant to leave Yuri alone for the free program, Victor asks his own coach, Yakov, to be Yuri's coach in his absence, much to everyone's shock.
| 9 | "Yuri vs Yuri! The Horror!! Rostelecom Cup, Free Skate"; Transliteration: "Yūri vs Yūri! Oso Roshia!! Roshia Taikai Furī Sukētingu" (Japanese: 勇利vsユーリ！おそロシア！！ロシア大会 フリースケーティング) | Takashi Kobayashi; Mihiro Yamaguchi; Kyōhei Ōyabu | December 1, 2016 | |
With Yakov agreeing to watch over Yuri K., Victor returns to Japan. Yuri P. receives homemade pork cutlet-filled pirozhki from his grandfather after he had mentioned how good pork cutlet bowls were in Japan. With his grandfather's love giving him strength, Yuri P. changes his jump difficulty to get a higher score. After a perfect performance, Yuri P. qualifies for the GPF. Without Victor, an anxious Yuri K. fumbles in his routine, but receives enough points to also qualify for the GPF. Yuri K. contemplates retiring after the GPF and having Victor step down as coach. Finally getting past his grudge against Yuri K., Yuri P. gifts him some of his grandfather's pork cutlet pirozhki as an early birthday present, his first act of friendship toward Yuri K. Returning home, Yuri K. shares a heartfelt reunion with Victor, with Makkachin alive and well, and asks Victor never to retire as his coach. Victor in turn asks Yuri never to retire from skating.
| 10 | "Gotta Supercharge it! Pre-Grand Prix Final Special!"; Transliteration: "Chō Ganbaranba!! Guranpurifainaru Chokuzen Supesharu" (Japanese: 超がんばらんば！！グランプリファイナル直前スペシャル) | Kunihiro Mori; Norihito Takahashi | December 8, 2016 | |
The skaters gather in Barcelona for the Grand Prix Final. Victor reflects on how his life has changed since meeting Yuri K., and how he focused on skating to the detriment of his personal life. Yuri P. meets and befriends Otabek Altin, a skater from Kazakhstan. Yuri K. purchases a pair of rings for himself and Victor, which Victor refers to as "engagement rings," and says that they will marry after Yuri wins the GPF. Yuri and Victor invite the skaters to dinner, where it is revealed that during last season's post-GPF banquet, Yuri K. got drunk and challenged everyone to a dance-off. A spiteful Yuri P. angrily confronts Victor, believing Victor will never compete again since he is content with coaching. In a post-credits scene, it is revealed that at the GPF banquet, a drunken Yuri K. had asked Victor to be his coach, which sparked Victor's initial interest in him.
| 11 | "Gotta Super-Supercharge it! Grand Prix Final Short Program"; Transliteration: "Chō Chō Ganbaranba!! Guranpurifainaru SP" (Japanese: 超超がんばらんば！！グランプリファイナルSP) | Yasuhiro Geshi | December 15, 2016 | |
The GPF begins: going first in the short program, Yuri K. earns a good score and succeeds in doing a quadruple flip, though he is not able to land it cleanly. Having finally perfected his agape program from his experience with others, Yuri P. gives a masterful, high-difficulty performance and breaks the world record that Victor had set, amazing everyone. While Phichit Chulanont's, Christophe Giacometti's, and Otabek Altin's programs go well due to their determination, Canadian skater Jean-Jacques "JJ" Leroy for the first time gives a very sub-par performance, succumbing to the pressure, but puts on a brave face due to his fans' support despite landing last place. In the end, Yuri P. places first while Yuri K. places fourth. Later, Yuri K. notices how entranced Victor looks while watching the other skaters and tells Victor that he wishes to end their coach-student relationship after the GPF. The episode guest stars professional skater Nobunari Oda as a commentator of the short program of the Grand Prix Final competition alongside Morooka.
| 12 | "Gotta Super-Super-Supercharge it! Grand Prix Final Free Skate"; Transliteration: "Chō Chō Chō Ganbaranba!!! Guranpurifainaru FS" (Japanese: 超超超がんばらんば!!! グランプリファイナルFS) | Nobuyoshi Arai; Kaori Makita; Sayo Yamamoto | December 22, 2016 | |
Yuri K. tells Victor his plan to retire so Victor can return to ice skating, but Victor starts to cry at this. At the GPF, JJ redeems himself with a strong performance in the free skate. Yuri changes his jumps to get a higher score, and ends up breaking Victor's free skate world record. Victor is proud that both Yuri P. and Yuri K. beat his world records and tells Yuri K. that he will return to competitive skating. Disappointed that Yuri K. might retire, Yuri P. uses his free skate to convey his desire to keep competing against him. At the end, Yuri P. wins gold, Yuri K. wins silver, and JJ wins bronze. Yuri K. changes his mind and asks Victor to be his coach for one more year. At the GPF exhibition event, Yuri K. and Victor perform a pair ice dance edition of Victor's routine. As Victor wants to coach Yuri K. and compete simultaneously, Yuri K. moves to St. Petersburg to continue his training alongside him and Yuri P. The episode guest stars professional skater Stéphane Lambiel (voiced by himself in the Japanese dub and by Jessie James Grelle in the English dub) as an announcer for the GPF.

=== OVA ===
| English title | Original release date | Ref. |
|---|---|---|
| "Yuri on Ice Side Story: Welcome to The Madness" | May 16, 2017 | |
At the GPF exhibition event, Yuri P. performs a skating routine with Otabek.

== Home video release ==
=== Japanese-language releases ===
Japanese-language releases
| Vol. | Episodes | Audio commentary | Release date | Ref. |
|---|---|---|---|---|
| 1 | 1–2 | Episode 1: Toshiyuki Toyonaga (Yuri Katsuki), Mitsurou Kubo (series composer) | December 30, 2016 | |
| 2 | 3–4 | Episode 3: Kōki Uchiyama (Yuri Plisetsky), Mitsurou Kubo (series composer) | January 27, 2017 | |
| 3 | 5–6 | Episode 6: Junichi Suwabe (Victor Nikiforov), Mitsurou Kubo (series composer) | February 24, 2017 | |
| 4 | 7–8 | Episode 7: Kenshō Ono (Phichit Chulanont), Yūtarō Honjō (Guang-Hong Ji), Shunichi Toki (Leo de la Iglesia), Mitsurou Kubo (series composer) | March 31, 2017 | |
| 5 | 9–10 | Episode 10: Hiroki Yasumoto (Christophe Giacometti), Mamoru Miyano (Jean-Jacques "JJ" Leroy), Mitsurou Kubo (series composer) | April 28, 2017 | |
| 6 | 11–12 | Toshiyuki Toyonaga (Yuri Katsuki), Kōki Uchiyama (Yuri Plisetsky), Mitsurou Kubo (series composer) | May 26, 2017 | |

=== English-language releases ===
English-language releases
| Region | Release date | Ref. |
|---|---|---|
| United States | February 6, 2018 | |
| United Kingdom | October 8, 2018 | |
