= Niwata =

Niwata (written: 庭田) is a Japanese surname. Notable people with the surname include:

- Akiko Niwata (庭田 亜樹子, born 1984), Japanese women's footballer
- Kiyomi Niwata (庭田 清美, born 1970), Japanese triathlete
