= Ōendan =

Japanese sports rallying team

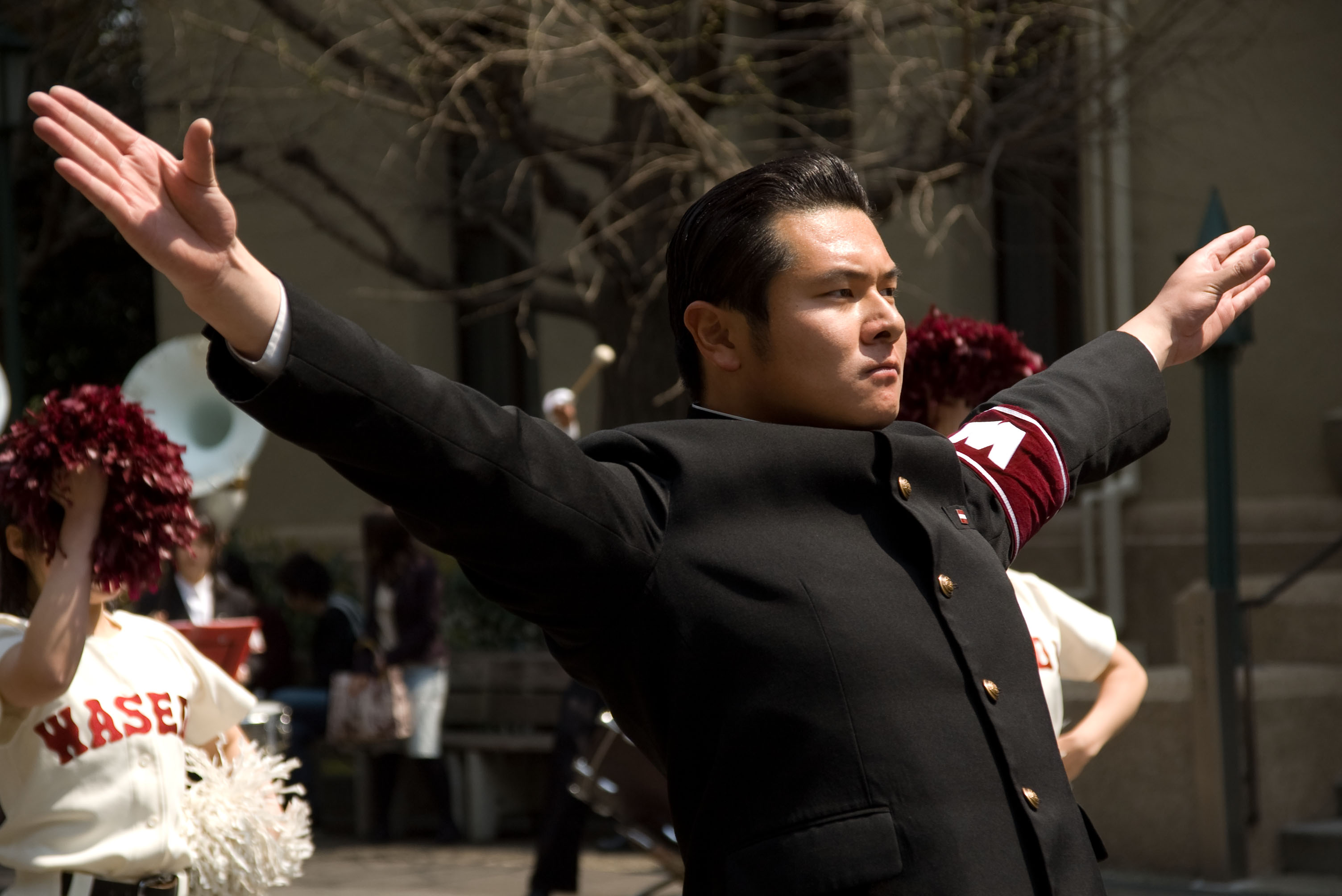
An ōendan

An ōendan (応援団), literally "cheering squad" or "cheering section", is a Japanese sports rallying team similar in purpose and allegedly inspired by the cheerleading squads in the United States, but relies more on making noise with bass drums or taiko drums, blowing horns and other items, waving flags and banners, and yelling through plastic megaphones in support of their sports team than on acrobatic moves (though some ōendan incorporate pom-pom girls). In addition to cheering for their own teams, ōendan have been known to lead fans in cheers which tease and taunt the other team and its fans. This is usually done in the spirit of good competition, but occasional fights have broken out if the taunting gets too heated. Smaller ōendan are sometimes called ōenbu (応援部; or "cheering clubs").

Like in high school and college sports in United States, the Ōendan may be followed by brass bands or by a group of fans playing songs in support for the teams on trumpets.

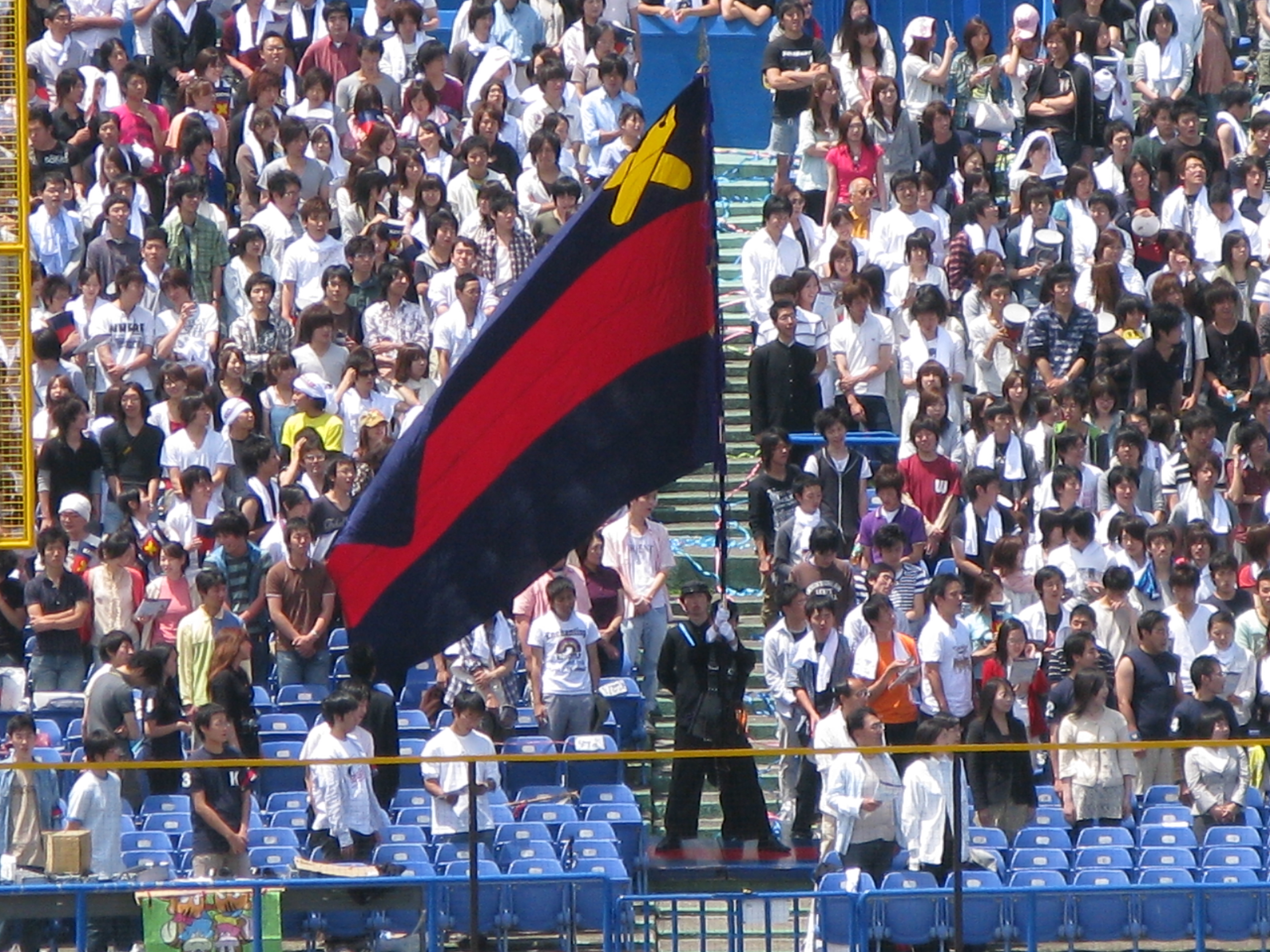
An ōendan member of Keio University during the Waseda Keio rivalry game

== Introduction ==
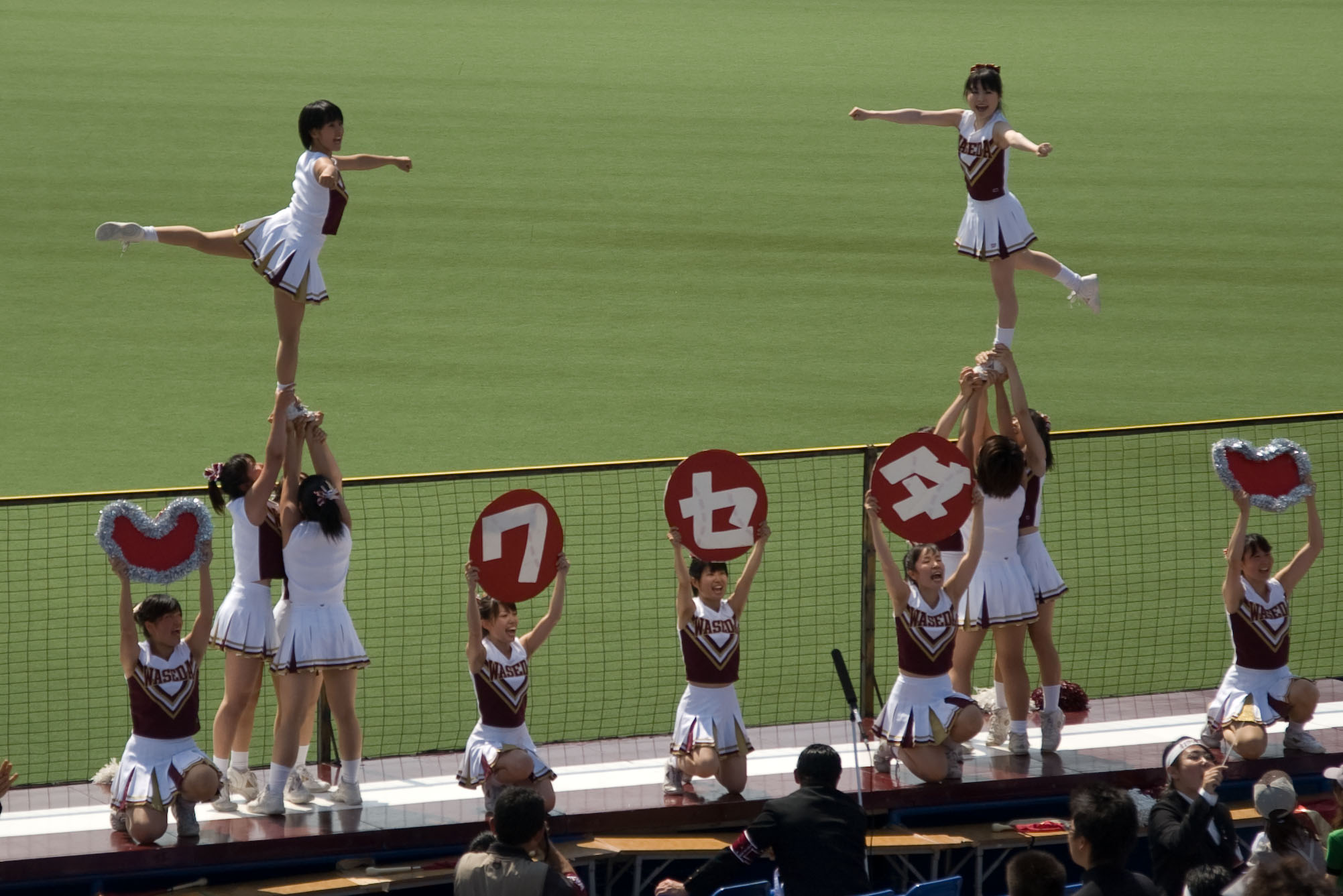
Japanese cheerleaders who are part of the Waseda University Cheerleading Club

Ōendan or ōenbu can be found in high schools, colleges, and universities, as well as in non-academic settings such as industrial league sports clubs (such as the intercity baseball tournament), professional sports fan clubs, and so on. Many schools hold competitions during their sports day events, and students often spend weeks perfecting their presentations after being divided up into teams.

Many members of an ōendan will dress in long happi and wear hachimaki emblazoned with team logos, inspirational sayings, or the names of their favorite players, something adopted by some fans of Japanese idol groups.

Especially with baseball teams, akin to Supporters' groups, the ōendan for each team will sit up in attendance and come up with unique cheers to help the fans become involved. These cheers may change depending on the player in the field or who the opposing team is. On occasion, the fans themselves will come up with a new cheer that is then adopted by other fans and their team's ōendan.

== See also ==
- Hiatari Ryōkō!, a manga and anime series in which one of the main characters is a member of the high school ōendan
- Osu! Tatakae! Ouendan, a game for the Nintendo DS in which the player participates in an ōendan
- Moero! Nekketsu Rhythm Damashii Osu! Tatakae! Ouendan 2, the sequel to Osu! Tatakae! Ouendan
- Elite Beat Agents, a North American Nintendo DS game based on Osu! Tatakae! Ouendan
- Pom squad
- Sakigake!! Otokojuku, a manga and anime series in which all of the characters are taught how to participate in ōendan
- Cheer Sticks
- Again!!, a manga series by Mitsurou Kubo which focuses on Imamura trying to help his school ōendan
- Baseball cheering culture in South Korea
