= Moteki =

Japanese manga series

- Cover of Moteki volume 4.5

モテキ
- Genre: Romantic comedy
- Manga
- Written by: Mitsurō Kubo
- Published by: Kodansha
- English publisher: NA: Vertical
- Magazine: Evening
- Original run: November 11, 2008 – April 13, 2010
- Volumes: 4
- Television drama
- Directed by: Hitoshi Ōne
- Original network: TV Tokyo
- Original run: July 16, 2010 – October 1, 2010
- Episodes: 12
- Live-action film
- Directed by: Hitoshi Ōne
- Studio: Toho
- Released: September 23, 2011
- Runtime: 118 minutes
- icon

Moteki (Japanese: モテキ) is a Japanese manga series written and illustrated by Mitsurō Kubo. It was serialized in Evening magazine from 2008 to 2010, with its chapters collected into four tankōbon volumes by Kodansha. It was adapted into a Japanese television drama in 2010 and a live-action film in 2011.

== Plot ==
Yukiyo Fujimoto is a temp worker living in Tokyo. He has never held a steady job or had a girlfriend. As he is about to turn 30, he is suddenly contacted by several women from his past: former co-worker and music enthusiast Aki Doi, younger friend and amateur photographer Itsuka Nakashiba, previous love interest Natsuki Komiyama, and former high school classmate and juvenile delinquent Naoko Hayashida. Yukiyo realizes that he is experiencing what is called his "moteki," a Japanese slang term for a period of time (usually the one-and-only period of time) where one becomes popular with the opposite sex. The term derives from a combination of the verb 'moteru' – i.e. to "have it" in the sense of "be popular", and 'ki', meaning "period".

== Media ==
=== Manga ===
Written and illustrated by Mitsurō Kubo, Moteki was serialized in the bi-weekly Evening magazine from November 11, 2008, to April 13, 2010. The chapters were collected into four tankōbon volumes and published by Kodansha between March 23, 2009, and May 21, 2010. With a special volume 4.5 released on September 7, 2010. Vertical have licensed the manga for a North American release in October 2017.

No.	Release date	ISBN
1	March 23, 2009	978-4-06-352259-4
2	August 21, 2009	978-4-06-352278-5
3	January 22, 2010	978-4-06-352296-9
4	May 21, 2010	978-4-06-352319-5

=== TV series ===
A live-action TV series of Moteki began airing in Japan on TV Tokyo on July 16, 2010. The live-action adaption features Mirai Moriyama as Yukiyo Fujimoto, Maho Nonami as Aki Doi, Hikari Mitsushima as Itsuka Nakashiba, Rio Matsumoto as Natsuki Komiyama, and Rinko Kikuchi as Naoko Hayashida.

=== Film ===
A live-action film of Moteki was released on March 23, 2012, with Mirai Moriyama reprising his role as Yukiyo Fujimoto, Masami Nagasawa as Miyuki Matsuo, Kumiko Asō as Rumiko Masumoto, Riisa Naka as Ai, and Yōko Maki as Motoko Katsuragi.

== Reception ==
Moteki was nominated for the 3rd Manga Taishō. The film adaptation earned US$18.4 million at the Japanese box office. Mirai Moriyama won the Mainichi Film Award for Best Actor for his performance in the film. It was nominated for four awards at the 35th Japan Academy Awards; Masami Nagasawa for Best Actress, Kumiko Asō for Best Supporting Actress, Taiseki Iwasaki for Music, and Yūsuke Ishida for Editing.
