= Again!! =

Japanese manga series by Mitsurō Kubo

- Volume 1 cover, featuring Yoshiko Usami
- Manga
- Written by: Mitsurō Kubo
- Published by: Kodansha
- English publisher: NA: Kodansha USA
- Magazine: Weekly Shōnen Magazine
- Original run: April 6, 2011 – April 9, 2014
- Volumes: 12
- Television drama
- Original run: July 21, 2014 – September 22, 2014

Again!! (Japanese: アゲイン!!, Hepburn: Agein!!) is a Japanese manga series written and illustrated by Mitsurō Kubo. It was serialized in 2011 in Weekly Shōnen Magazine published by Kodansha until reaching its conclusion in 2014. It was adapted into a Japanese television drama series in the summer of 2014.

== Synopsis ==
Kin'ichirō Imamura, a high school senior, prepares to graduate with no friends and having never participated in extracurricular activities. An accident on the last day of school somehow sends Imamura and Akira Fujieda, a popular girl in Imamura's graduating class, back in time to their first day of high school. Imamura seizes the opportunity for a second chance to improve his high school life, and joins the school's troubled ōendan club.

== Characters ==
Kin'ichirō Imamura (今村金一郎, Imamura Kin'ichirō)
The protagonist of the series. Assumed to be a delinquent by his classmates because of his appearance, he was a loner throughout high school and joined no school clubs. On his last day of school, he recalls a memory of the captain of his school's now-defunct ōendan singing the school anthem. He attempts to break into the club's former office, though he instead falls down a flight of stairs and wakes up three years in the past, on his first day of high school. Recalling how the ōendan club was disbanded during his time in high school, he joins the club and vows to save it.
Akira Fujieda (藤枝暁, Fujieda Akira)
A popular girl in Imamura's class. She witnesses Imamura breaking into the ōendan's office and assumes him to be a thief, but falls down a flight of stairs when running to seek help. Like Imamura, she is sent back in time to her first day of high school.
Yoshiko Usami (宇佐美良子, Usami Yoshiko)
The captain of the school's ōendan. She is the sole member of the club, having driven away the other members with her stubbornness and extreme work ethic. When Imamura joins the ōendan, he helps her to regather the club's old members.
Tamaki Abe (安倍珠貴, Abe Tamaki)
The captain of the school's cheerleading squad. She greatly despises the ōendan, believing them to be old-fashioned.
Kitajima (北島, Kitajima)
The school's guidance counselor, and the ōendan's faculty advisor.

== Media ==
=== Manga ===
Again!! has been collected as twelve tankōbon published by Kodansha.

==== Volumes ====
No.	Original release date	Original ISBN	English release date	English ISBN
1	September 16, 2011	978-4-06-384542-6	February 27, 2018	978-1632366450
1. "Congratulations, Graduate" (卒業、おめでとう, Sotsugyō, Omedetō); 2. "Aki's Situation" (アキの場合, Aki no Baai); 3. "Ultra-Strength Recruiting!" (勧誘・メガ・ストロング！, Kan'yū Mega Sutorongu!); 4. "We Need You!"; 5. "Cheerleader Rapid Fire" (チア・ザ・マシンガン！, Chia Za Mashingan!); 6. "Troublemaker?" (虎ブルメイカー？, Toraburumēkā?); 7. "We Want to Cheer With You!" (一緒に応援したいです!!, Issho ni Ōenshitai Desu!!); 8. "Ordinary World: Realm of Boredom" (Ordinary World：退屈な世界, Ordinary World: Taikutsu na Sekai); 9. "The Dirt on Usami" (ウワサのあのコのウワサ, Uwasa no Ano Ko no Uwasa)
2	November 17, 2011	978-4-06-376147-4	April 17, 2018	978-1632366467
10. "Hugging hazard" (抱擁デンジャラス, Hōyō Denjarasu); 11. "The Road to the Third-Years" (Road to the 3年生, Road to the Surī-nensei); 12. "Everybody Yell Now!" (逆ギレ！ エヴリバディ!!, Gyaku Gire! Evuribadi!!); 13. "The Day Before the Big Day" (The day before：その前日に, The Day Before: Sono Zenjitsu ni); 14. "All Night Party!" (ワンナイト・カーニバル！, Wan-naito Kānibaru!); 15. "Screw It!" (勝手にしやがれ！, Katte ni Shiyagare!); 16. "Raw Feelings" (ハダカのココロ, Hadaka no Kokoro); 17. "Cheer!!!" (エール!!!!, Ēru!!!!); 18. "The Girl Who Didn't Want to Leap Through Time" (時をかけたくなかった少女, Toki o Kaketakunakatta Shōjo); 19. "Destined for Defeat" (必敗のデスティニー, Hippai no Desutinī)
3	January 17, 2012	978-4-06-376184-9	June 12, 2018	978-1632366474
20. "The Up-and-coming Ace!" (アイツは期待の超新人!!, Aitsu wa Kitai no Chō-shinjin!!); 21. "Runaway Love Train" (恋心暴走列車, Koigokoro Bōsō Ressha); 22. "Heavy Rotation" (ヘビーローテンション, Hebī Rōtenshon); 23. "Usami's Feminine Side" (She is オンナのフェイス, She is Onna no Feisu); 24. "The Ouendan With the Wild Moves" (狂乱麗舞応援団！, Kyōran Reibu Ōendan!); 25. "Let Me Sleep in Your Arms" (抱いてくれたらいいのに？, Daitekuretara Ii noni?); 26. "Ouendan Boot Camp!" (エンダン・ブートキャンプ！, Endan Būtokyanpu!); 27. "A Hard Day's Night" (ハード・デイズ・ナイト, Hādo Deizu Naito); 28. "Walk On" (歩いていこう, Aruite Ikou); 29. "Usami, Hoist by Her Own Petard!" (勇み足ウサミー, Isamiashi Usamii); 30. "Trust Bomb" (信頼関係爆弾, Shinraikankei Bakudan)
4	April 17, 2012	978-4-06-376626-4	August 21, 2018	978-1632366481
31. "Hold Me, Twilight" (抱きしめてTwilight, Dakishimete Twilight); 32. "A Good Day to Fly" (飛ぶにはいい日だ, Tobu ni wa Ii Hi da); 33. "Left Behind" (おいてけぼり, Oitekebori); 34. "Change the World"; 35. "Here and There" (アッチとコッチ, Atchi to Kotchi); 36. "Forget-me-not"; 37. "I Miss You When You're Gone" (逢いたい時にあなたは‥‥, Aitai Tokini Anata wa...); 38. "One Hell of a Kiss" (男殺接吻地獄, Otokogoroshi Seppun no Jigoku); 39. "Partners?" (相棒？, Aibō?); 40. "Reunion" (再会, Saikai); 41. "Bridge Over Troubled Water"
5	July 17, 2012	978-4-06-376653-0	October 2, 2018	978-1632366498
42. "Misunderstanding × Misunderstanding" (誤解×誤解, Gokari × Gokari); 43. "Rooftop Rendezvous" (屋上ランデブー, Okujyō Randebū); 44. "Second Do-over" (セカンド・アゲイン, Sekando Agein); 45. "Give Me Love" (愛をください, Ai o Kudasai); 46. "Dance! Sexual Relations!" (踊れ！ 肉体関係!!, Odore! Nikutaikankei!!); 47. "Check Out Who's Checking In" (おまえにチェックイン！, Omae ni Chekkuin!); 48. The Weirdo Ouendan Five (応援戦隊変人ファイブ！, Ōen Sentai Henjin Faibu!); 49. Why I'm Here (今、ここにいる理由, Ima, Koko ni Iru Riyū); 50. "Our Dear, Glorious Ouendan!" (花の！ 花の応援団!!, Hana no! Hana no Ōendan!!); 51. "The Go Get 'Em Cheer" (がんばれがんばれ節, Ganbare Ganbare Bushi); 52. "Victory Dance!" (勝利の舞!!!!, Shōri no Mai!!!!)
6	October 17, 2012	978-4-06-376714-8	December 11, 2018	978-1632366504
53. "Why, Why Did We" (どうして どうして私達, Dōshite Dōshite Watashi-tachi); 54. "Play Ball" (プレイボール, Pureibōru); 55. "Overthinking It" (妄想の箱, Mōsō no Hako); 56. "Isolation" (孤独論, Kodokuron); 57. "The Bathroom Duel" (便所の決闘, Benjo no Kettō); 58. "Flashbacks to Another Life" (未体験フラッシュバック, Mi-taiken Furasshubakku); 59. "Usami Magic!" (宇佐美マジック！, Usami Majikku!); 60. "Pontytail and Joyful!" (ポニーテールとじょいふる！, Ponītēru to Joifuru!); 61. "Fun Fun Cheering!" (Fun Fun 応援！, Fun Fun Ōen!); 62. "Kiss Me Now!" (今すぐキスミー！, Ima Sugu Kisumī!); 63. "All We Need Is The Ouendan" (All we need is OUENDAN!!); 64. "The World Beyond" (あの先の世界, Ano Saki no Sekai)
7	January 17, 2013	978-4-06-376768-1	March 19, 2019	978-1-63236-713-6
65. "Stand of Dreams"; 66. "Party's Over..." (宴のあとの‥‥, Utage no Ato no...); 67. "Dirty Do-Over!" (Again vice！); 68. "Devilishly Charming" (不道徳チャーミング, Fudōtoku Chāmingu); 69. "Clotheslined" (地獄のクロスライン, Jigoku no Kurosurain); 70. "Red Hot Cherry Peppers" (レッド・ホット・チェリー・ペッパーズ, Reddo Hotto Cherī Peppāzu); 71. "The ABCs of Eros" (大人の色恋ABC, Otona no Irokoi ABC); 72. "An After-Halftime Affair" (中入り後の情事, Nakairi-go no Jōji); 73. "The Imamura Comedy Hour" (今村家新喜劇, Imamura Keshin Kigeki); 74. "The Creature from the West Building" (西の魔窟に棲む魔物, Nishi no Makutsu ni Sumu Mamono); 75. "Negativity Monster" (ネガティブ・モンスター, Negatibu Monsutā)
8	April 17, 2013	978-4-06-376808-4	April 30, 2019	978-1-63236-714-3
76. "A Transformation, Before and After!" (激烈！ ビフォーアフター!!, Gekiretsu! Bifōafutā!!); 77. "The Misery of Passivity" (無抵抗主義ミザリー, Muteikōshugi Mizarī); 78. "Can't Let You Go" (ほっとけないよ, Hottokenai yo); 79. "Rebel Shakespeare" (反逆のシェイクスピア, Hangyaku no Sheikusupia); 80. "Song and Dance! The Dream Play!" (歌おう！ 踊ろう！ 夢芝居!!, Utao u! Odoro u! Yume Shibai!!); 81. "Students of the World, Hear Me!" (聞け！ 万国の高校生!!, Kike! Bankoku no Kōkōsei!!); 82. "I Want to Die: the Musical ♫" (死にたいミュージカル♪, Shinitai Myūjikaru); 83. "My Fair Lady" (マイ・フェア・レディ, Mai Fea Redi); 84. "He's Irresistible" (オンナはそれをガマンできない, Onna wa Sore o Gaman Dekinai); 85. "Beautiful Power" (ウツクシイチカラ, Utsukushii Chikara); 86. "The Story Goes a Bit Off the Rails" (物語はちと？不安定, Monogatari wa Chito? Fuantei)
9	July 17, 2013	978-4-06-376859-6	June 18, 2019	978-1-63236-781-5
87. "Adrenaline-fueled Death Wish" (火事場のしにたい力, Kajiba no Shinitai Ryoku); 88. "The Leading Role" (センターポジション, Sentāpojishon); 89. "(Video) The Latest High School Musical Isn't What You'd Expect" (【動画有】"しにミュ"がヤバイんだが‥‥, Dōga Yū: "Shi ni Myu" ga Yabai nda ga); 90. "Please Stop, Mr. Teacher" (およしになってねTEACHER, Oyoshi ni Natte ne Tīchā); 91. "Passion ★ Killing ☾ Serenade" (情熱★冷や水☾せれなーで, Jōnetsu Hiyamizu Serenā de); 92. "I Don't Wanna Be Some Punk!" (オラこんな自分イヤだ！, Ora Konna Jibun Iya da!); 93. "The Naked Truth" (フタリノハダカンボウ, Futari no wa da Kanbō); 94. "The Secret Death Wish Show" (秘密の"しにたい"SHOW, Himitsu no "Shinitai" Shō); 95. "Dead or Alive"; 96. "Death Wish Inflation" (しにたいインフレーション, Shinitai Infurēshon); 97. "The Empty Everyday" (何もなかったエブリデイ, Nanimo Nakatta Eburidei); 98. "Happy Scary" (タノシイコワイ, Tanoshii Kowai)
10	October 17, 2013	978-4-06-376903-6	August 6, 2019	978-1632367822
99. "This Last One's For You" (ラストソングはあなたに, Rasuto Songu wa Anata ni); 100. "Parting Words" (贈る言葉, Okuru Kotoba); 101. "Blissful Teen Identity Crisis" (幸福少女前後不覚, Kōfuku Shōjo Zengofukaku); 102. "Dramatic Rain" (ドラマティック・レイン, Doramatikku Rein); 103. "All You Need Is Love!" (愛し愛されて生きるのよ!!, Ashi Aisarete Ikiru no yo!!); 104. "Woman, Such a Fickle Creature" (女だってシャボン玉!?, Onna datte Shabondama !?); 105. "Falling Down" (フォーリング・ダウン, Fōringu Daun); 106. "Usami In Wonderland" (ウサミ・イン・ワンダーランド, Usami In Wandārando); 107. "The Unbearable Loneliness of Being" (存在の耐えられない孤独, Sonzai no Taerarenai Kodoku); 108. "Can't Let You Go" (ほっとけないよ, Hottokenai yo); 109. "Never Mind, Grandma" (ばーちゃんネバーマインド, Bāchan Nebāmaindo); 110. "Cap-cap-cap! Captain!" (ダンダダンダン！ 団長!!, Dandadandan! Danchō!!); 111. "Heroes In Blazers" (ガクランヒーローズ, Gakuran Hīrōzu)
11	February 17, 2014	978-4-06-376929-6	October 1, 2019	978-1632368263
112. "The Ouendan Is Too Much!" (応援団なんて無理ナンデス！, Ōendan nante Muri Nandesu!); 113. "Every Captain's Different" (団長十色, Danchō Toiro); 114. "My Name Is Summerhiko" (我が名はサマ彦, Waga Na wa Sama Hiko); 115. "Don't Lose Hope!" (負けないで！, Makenaide!); 116. "The Friend of My Friend Is a Stranger" (友達の友達は他人, Tomodachi no Tomodachi wa Tanin); 117. "Qualifying for Captain" (団長の条件, Danchō no Jōken); 118. "Divide and Self-own" (内部分裂自家中毒, Naibubunretsu Jikachúdoku); 119. "Analyze Me!" (アナライズ・ミー！, Anaraizu Mī!); 120. "Love Beyond the Stream" (愛は湯気のかなたに, Ai wa Yuge no Kanata ni); 121. "Streetside Cheer Up!!" (街角 Cheer Up!!, Machikado Cheer Up!!); 122. "A Lonely Runaway!" (孤独のRunaway！, Kodoku no Runaway!!); 123. "You Don't Make My Heart Sing" (あの鐘を鳴らさなかったのはあなた, Ano Kane o Narasanakatta no wa Anata); 124. "Strength of the Heart" (ハートがストロング, Hāto ga Sutorongu)
12	May 16, 2014	978-4-06-376984-5	December 17, 2019	978-1632368270
125. "On Your Mark" (いちについて, Ichi Nitsuite); 126. "Run!" (走れ！, Hashire!); 127. "Hello From the Bottom of Your Lungs" (ハラの底からコンニチハ, Hara no Soko kara Konnichiwa); 128. "Happy to Be a Bunny?" (ウサギはウサギ？, Usagi wa Usagi?); 129. "Came a Long Way?!" (思わず遠くに来たもんだ!?, Omowazu Tōku ni Kita Mon da!?); 130. "Nine Years Later" (9年後, Nain Nengo); 131. "Alone Again" (アローン・アゲイン, Arōn Agein); 132. "Stand By You" (スタンド・バイ・ユー, Sutando Bai Yū); 133. "Awkward/Other Side" (ドン引き・アザー・サイド, Donbiki Azā Saido); 134. "A Simple Cheer" (当ったり前の応援歌, Attarimae no Ōenka); 135. "Resurrection of the Blond Wolf" (蘇った金狼！, Yomigaetta Kimu Kinrō!); 136. "Screw a Do-Over!" (アゲインなんてぶっとばせ!!, Agein Nante Buttobase!!)
