= Ushiku Domain =

Ushiku Domain 牛久藩
- under Tokugawa shogunate Japan
- 1600–1871
- Capital: Ushiku jin'ya
  - Type: Daimyō
- Historical era: Edo period
  - Established: 1600
  - Disestablished: 1871
- Today part of: part of Ibaraki Prefecture

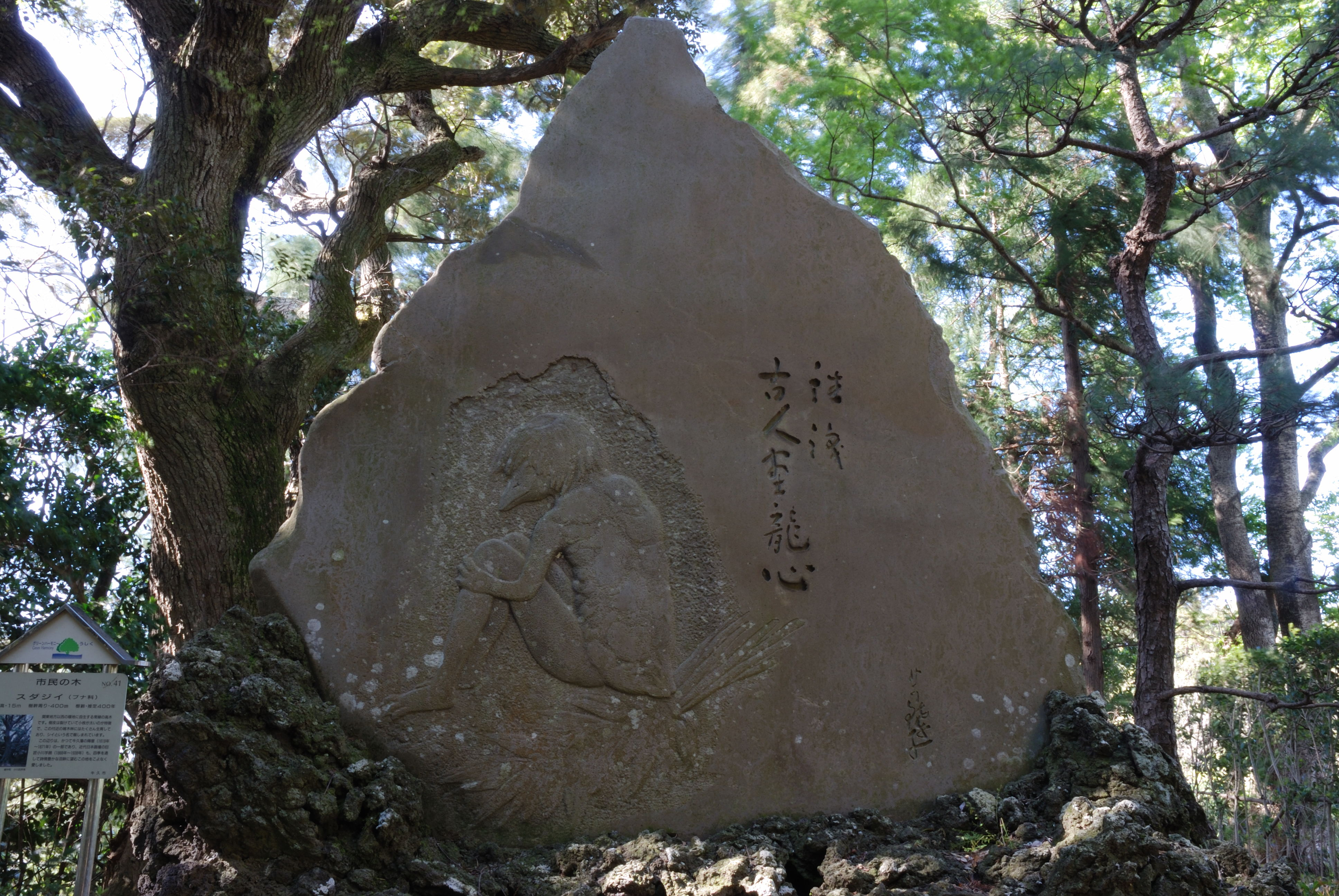
Ushiku Jin'ya was located on a raised area surrounded by Ushiku-numa, also known as Kappa-numa after the mythical creature

Ushiku Domain (牛久藩, Ushiku-han) was a feudal domain under the Tokugawa shogunate of Edo period Japan, located in Hitachi Province (modern-day Ibaraki Prefecture), Japan. It was centered on Ushiku Jin'ya in what is now the city of Ushiku, Ibaraki. It was ruled for much of its history by the Yamaguchi clan.

== History ==
In 1590 after the victory of Toyotomi Hideyoshi in the Siege of Odawara, Akai Teruko was rewarded with a territory of 5,435 koku in Ushiku, Ibaraki. The Yamaguchi clan was a junior branch of the Ōuchi clan and originated in what is now Yamaguchi Prefecture. Yamaguchi Shigemasa served Oda Nobukatsu and subsequently came into the service of Tokugawa Ieyasu. For his efforts at the Battle of Sekigahara, he was awarded a 5,000 koku holding in Kazusa Province and another 5000 koku holding in Musashi Province, to which he subsequently added another 5000 koku in Shimotsuke Province. However, he fell afoul of the Tokugawa shogunate when he arranged the marriage of his son and heir, Yamaguchi Shigenobu to a daughter of Ōkubo Tadachika without bothering to ask for permission first. For this violation he was stripped of his holdings and placed under house arrest. After apologizing, and after the death of Shigenobu in combat during the Siege of Osaka as a common soldier, Ieyasu relented and restored him to a 15,000 koku holding in Tōtōmi Province. He traded this holding for an equivalent in Hitachi Province in 1628, marking the start of Ushiku Domain.

Shigemasa's fourth son and successor Yamaguchi Hirotaka constructed the jin’ya; however, he also divided 5,000 koku of the domain to his younger brother Shigetsune. The descendants Of Yamaguchi Hirotaka continued to rule the 10,000 koku domain until the Meiji restoration.

The domain had a total population of 8,604 people in 1,646 households per a census in 1869, of which 434 people in 130 households were classed as samurai.

== Holdings at the end of the Edo period ==
As with most domains in the han system, Ushiku Domain consisted of several discontinuous territories calculated to provide the assigned kokudaka, based on periodic cadastral surveys and projected agricultural yields. In the case of the Yamaguchi, their holdings were divided between Hitachi and Shimosa provinces.

- Hitachi Province
  - 11 villages in Niihari District
  - 13 villages in Kawachi District
  - 2 villages in Shida District
- Shimosa Province
  - 1 village in Toyoda District
  - 4 villages in Okada District
  - 2 villages in Soma District

== List of daimyō ==
#	Name	Tenure	Courtesy title	Court Rank	kokudaka
Yamaguchi clan (fudai) 1628-1871
1	Yamaguchi Shigemasa (山口 重政)	1628-1635	Tajima-no-kami (但馬守)	Lower 5th (従五位下)	15,000 koku
2	Yamaguchi Hirotaka (山口弘隆)	1635–1677	Tajima-no-kami (但馬守)	Lower 5th (従五位下)	15,000 ->10,000 koku
3	Yamaguchi Shigesada (山口 重貞)	1677-1698	Shuri-no-suke (修理亮)	Lower 5th (従五位下)	10,000 koku
4	Yamaguchi Hirotoyo (山口 弘豊)	1698-1731	Tajima-no-kami (但馬守)	Lower 5th (従五位下)	10,000 koku
5	Yamaguchi Hironaga (山口 弘長)	1731-1768	Shuri-no-suke (修理亮)	Lower 5th (従五位下)	10,000 koku
6	Yamaguchi Hiromichi (山口 弘道)	1768-1783	Shuri-no-suke (修理亮)	Lower 5th (従五位下)	10,000 koku
7	Yamaguchi Hirochika (山口弘務)	1783-1787	Izu-no-kami (伊豆守)	Lower 5th (従五位下)	10,000 koku
8	Yamaguchi Hiromune (山口 弘致)	1787-1829	Tajima-no-kami (但馬守)	Lower 5th (従五位下)	10,000 koku
9	Yamaguchi Hirokuni (山口 弘封)	1829-1839	Tajima-no-kami (但馬守)	Lower 5th (従五位下)	10,000 koku
10	Yamaguchi Hirokata (山口 弘穀)	1839-1849	Suo-no-kami (周防守)	Lower 5th (従五位下)	10,000 koku
11	Yamaguchi Hiroakira (山口 弘敞)	1849-1862	Chikuzen-no-kami (筑前守)	Lower 5th (従五位下)	10,000 koku
12	Yamaguchi Hiroyoshi (山口 弘達)	1862-1871	Suo-no-kami (周防守)	Lower 5th (従五位下)	10,000 koku
