= Takumi Kobe =

Japanese baseball player

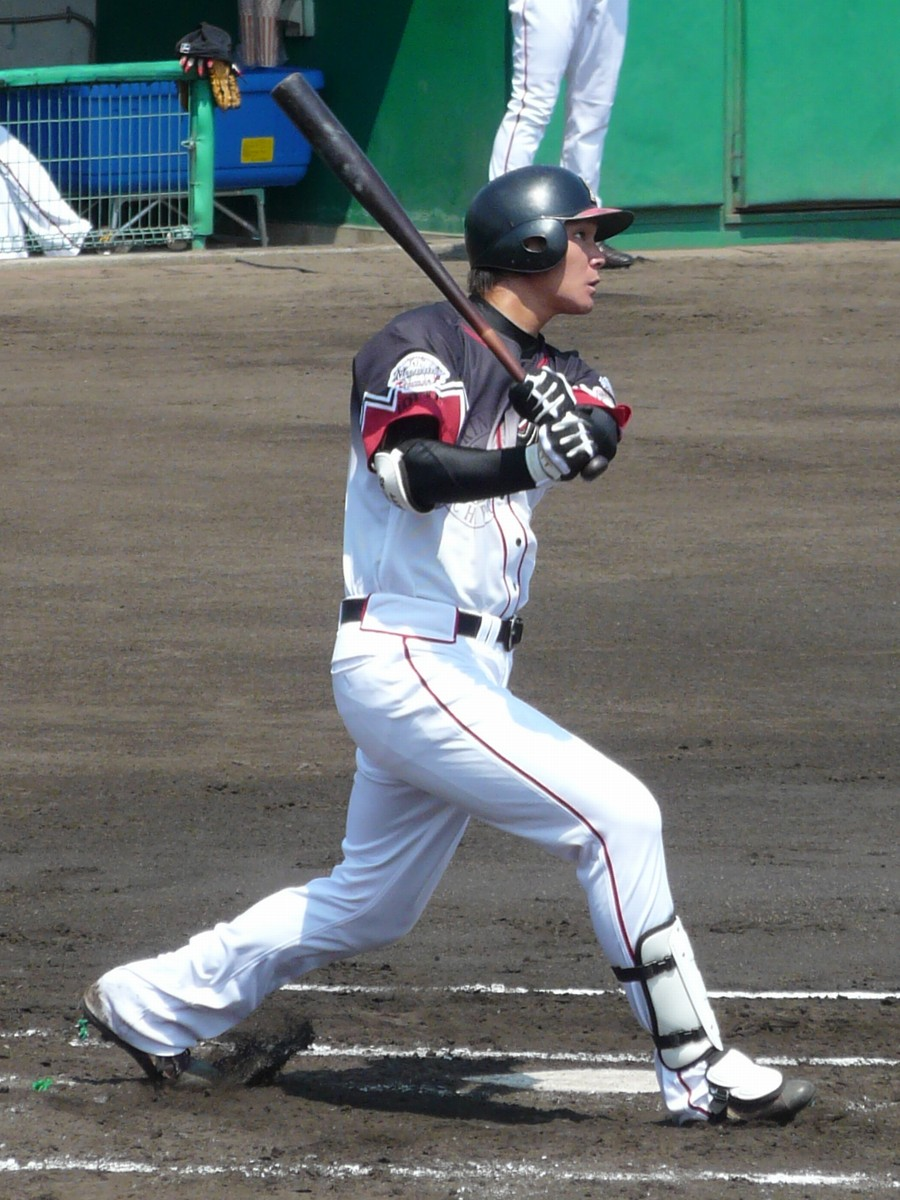
- Outfielder
- Born: February 23, 1985 (age 41)
- Batted: Left Threw: Right

NPB debut
- 2008, for the Chiba Lotte Marines

Last appearance
- 2013, for the Chiba Lotte Marines

NPB statistics
- Batting average: .198
- Home runs: 4
- RBI: 17
- Stats at Baseball Reference

Teams
- Chiba Lotte Marines (2008–2011, 2013)

Takumi Kobe (神戸 拓光, born February 23, 1985, in Ushiku, Ibaraki) is a Japanese former professional baseball outfielder who played from 2008 to 2013 with the Chiba Lotte Marines in Japan's Nippon Professional Baseball.
