= Higashi Nihon Immigration Center =

Immigrant detention center in Japan

Coordinates: 35°58′12.75″N 140°12′42.43″E

Higashi-Nihon Immigration Center at Ushiku, Ibaraki

Higashi Nihon Immigration Center (also known as East Japan Immigration Center, or Ushiku Detention Center) is one of three immigration detention centers of Japan operated by Ministry of Justice and located in Ushiku, Ibaraki prefecture. It houses approximately 700 people both of males and females. It opened in 1993 for the exceeded capacity of Yokohama Immigration Detention Center. There have been claims among the human rights activists of inmates being detained for lengthy periods. March 11, 2011, because of the 2011 Tōhoku earthquake and tsunami the old facility was closed.
