= Ushiku =

Ushiku 牛久市
- City
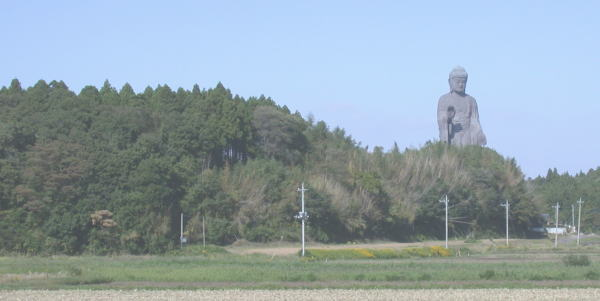
- View of Kuno Castle (久野城) ruins and the Ushiku Daibutsu

- Flag Seal

- Location of Ushiku in Ibaraki Prefecture

- Coordinates: 35°58′45.7″N 140°8′58.4″E
- Country: Japan
- Region: Kantō
- Prefecture: Ibaraki
- Village Settled: April 1, 1889
- Town Settled: January 1, 1954
- City Settled: June 1, 1986

Government
  - Mayor: Kazutoshi Numata (from September 2023)

Area
  - Total: 58.92 km^{2} (22.75 sq mi)

Population (January 2024)
  - Total: 83,826
  - Density: 1,423/km^{2} (3,685/sq mi)
- Time zone: UTC+9 (Japan Standard Time)
- Tree: Osmanthus fragrans
- Flower: Chrysanthemum
- Bird: Japanese bush warbler
- Phone number: 029-873-2111
- Address: 3-15-1 Chuo, Ushiku-shi, Ibaraki-ken 300-1292
- Website: Official website

Ushiku (牛久市, Ushiku-shi; Japanese pronunciation: [ɯ̈̀.ɕi̥.kɯ̈́(.ɕì)]) is a city located in Ibaraki Prefecture, Japan. As of 1 January 2024, the city had an estimated population of 83,826 in 36,380 households and a population density of 1423 persons per km^{2}. The percentage of the population aged over 65 was 29.5%. The total area of the city is 58.92 square kilometres (22.75 sq mi).

== Geography ==
Ushiku is located in southern Ibaraki Prefecture, in the low-lying marshy flatlands south of Lake Kasumigaura. It is about 50 kilometers from central Tokyo.

=== Surrounding municipalities ===
- Ibaraki Prefecture
  - Ami
  - Inashiki
  - Ryūgasaki
  - Tsuchiura
  - Tsukuba

=== Climate ===
Ushiku has a Humid continental climate (Köppen Cfa) characterized by warm summers and cool winters with light snowfall. The average annual temperature in Ushiku is 14.0 °C. The average annual rainfall is 1304 mm with September as the wettest month. The temperatures are highest on average in August, at around 25.9 °C, and lowest in January, at around 3.0 °C.

== Demographics ==
Per Japanese census data, the population of Ushiku has grown nearly ninefold over the past 100 years, with especially rapid growth taking place in the late 20th century.

Historical population
Year	Pop.	±%
1920	9,589	—
1930	10,108	+5.4%
1940	10,994	+8.8%
1950	15,176	+38.0%
1960	16,131	+6.3%
1970	19,372	+20.1%
1980	40,164	+107.3%
1990	60,693	+51.1%
2000	73,258	+20.7%
2010	81,684	+11.5%
2020	84,651	+3.6%

== History ==
The area of Ushiku developed as a castle town around Ushiku Domain, a feudal holding under the Tokugawa shogunate in the Edo period. The village of Ushiku was created after the Meiji restoration with the establishment of the modern municipalities system on April 1, 1889. On January 1, 1954 it was elevated to town status and to city status on June 1, 1986.

On January 31, 2020, a magnitude 5.3 earthquake hit 6 kilometres west of the town. The official time of the earthquake was 17:07:47 (UTC).

== Government ==
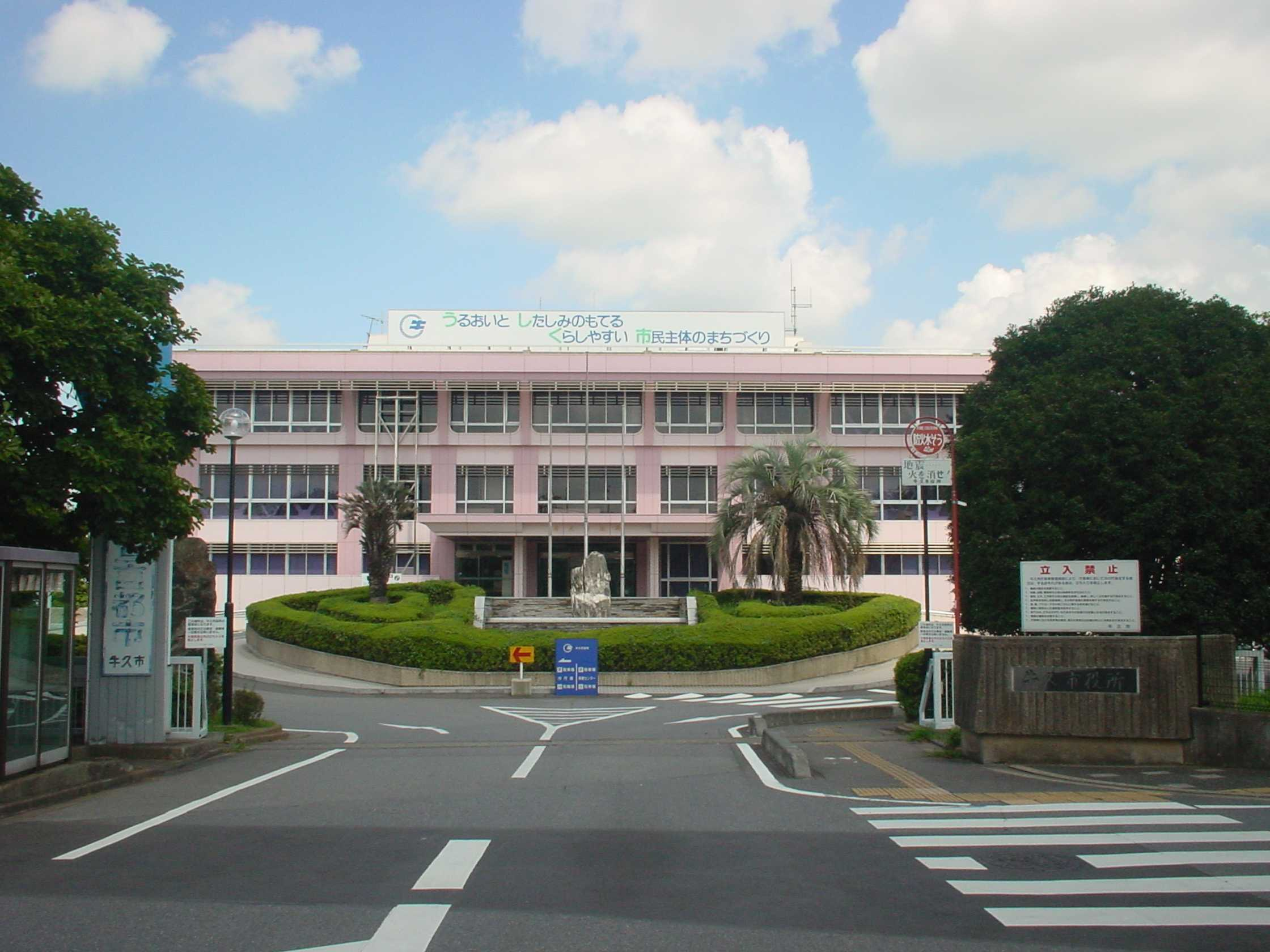
Ushiku city hall

Ushiku has a mayor-council form of government with a directly elected mayor and a unicameral city council of 22 members. Ushiku contributes two members to the Ibaraki Prefectural Assembly. In terms of national politics, the city is part of Ibaraki 3rd district of the lower house of the Diet of Japan.

== Economy ==
Ushiku is a local commercial center and has a small industrial park. It is also a commuter town for the Tokyo Metropolis. However, the local economy remains based on agriculture, primarily rice cultivation.

== Education ==
Ushiku has eight public elementary schools and six public middle schools operated by the city government, and two public high schools operated by the Ibaraki Prefectural Board of Education. The city also has one private combined middle/high school.

== Transportation ==
=== Railway ===
JR East – Jōban Line

- Ushiku - Hitachino-Ushiku

=== Highway ===
- Ken-Ō Expressway
- National Route 6
- National Route 408

== Sister cities ==
- Hitachiōta, Ibaraki, Japan, since 1986
- Shikama, Miyagi, Japan, since 1988
- Greve in Chianti, Italy, since 2013
- Whitehorse, Yukon, Canada, since 1985
- Orange, New South Wales, Australia, since 1990

== Local attractions ==
- Chateau Kamiya, a wine chateau started in 1901
- Higashi Nihon Immigration Center, Japan's largest detention center for the incarceration of immigrants.
- Ushiku Daibutsu, one of the world's tallest statues
- Ushikunuma, a scenic lake that is said to be the birthplace of the mythical kappa creature.

== Notable people ==
- Hiroshi Kamiya, voice actor (born in Matsudo, Chiba Prefecture)
- Kisenosato, sumo wrestler
- Mao Hosoya, professional football/soccer player
- Takumi Kobe, professional baseball player
- Kiyomi Niwata, Olympic triathlete
- Mineko Nomachi, essayist (born in Hokkaido)
- Shigeki Osawa, mixed martial artist
