= Mineko Nomachi =

Japanese manga artist and illustrator (born 1979)

- 能町みね子
- Born: March 17, 1979 (age 47); Hokkaido, Japan
- Education: University of Tokyo
- Notable work: I'm Queer but I'm an Office Lady

Mineko Nomachi (能町みね子, Nōmachi Mineko; born March 17, 1979) is a Japanese essayist, columnist, illustrator, and radio and television personality. She is best known for her blog I'm Queer but I'm an Office Lady (オカマだけどOLやってます。, O-kama dakedo OL yattemasu), which was published as a book by Bungeishunjū in 2006, and for multiple radio and television programs co-hosted with writer Mitsurou Kubo. Her name is a pen name derived from a combination of the names of her paternal and maternal grandmothers.

== Biography ==
=== Early life and career ===
Nomachi was born in Hokkaido on March 17, 1979. She is the older sister to Onoya, a pseudonymous writer and parfait critic. At the age of two, her family moved to Ushikyu in Ibaraki Prefecture, where Nomachi attended Ushikudaiichi Junior High School. After graduating high school, Nomachi attended and graduated from the University of Tokyo.

In 2005, she began writing the autobiographical blog I'm Queer but I'm an Office Lady (オカマだけどOLやってます。, O-kama dakedo OL yattemasu), where she detailed her experience as a transgender woman working as an office lady. The blog was published as a book by Bungeishunjū under the same title in 2006. Nomachi underwent sex reassignment surgery in 2007, and was legally recognized as a woman in her family's koseki, or family registry, that same year.

=== Television, radio, and cultural commentary ===
In 2011, Nomachi began co-hosting the radio show Oretachi Detox with writer Mitsurou Kubo. In 2012, Nomachi and Kubo were chosen in a public vote to host the radio program All Night Nippon 0. Nomachi and Kubo were promoted in 2013, and served as hosts of Mitsurou Kubo & Mineko's Nomachi's All Night Nippon from 2013 to 2015. From 2013 to 2017, Nomachi, Kubo, and Kenichi Maeyamada hosted Mine Kubo Hyada Kojirase Night, a variety program on Fuji TV. Nomachi is a sumo enthusiast, and since 2015 has appeared on NHK as a sumo commentator.

In 2015, Nomachi appeared on a Nippon TV variety program where she was introduced as an "onee talent", a slang term for an effeminate male television personality. Nomachi objected to the term's use in an interview with Mainichi Shimbun, calling its use discriminatory; Nippon TV acknowledged Nomachi's objection, but did not issue an apology.

In 2019, Nomachi led a campaign against JR East to protest the naming of Takanawa Gateway Station, after the company solicited suggestions to name the station in a public poll before ultimately choosing a name without a plurality of public support. Following the death of talent manager Johnny Kitagawa in 2019, Nomachi wrote an editorial in Shūkan Bunshun criticizing the Japanese press for their failure to acknowledge allegations of sexual abuse by Kitagawa in their obituaries.
