= Waseda University Cheerleading Club =

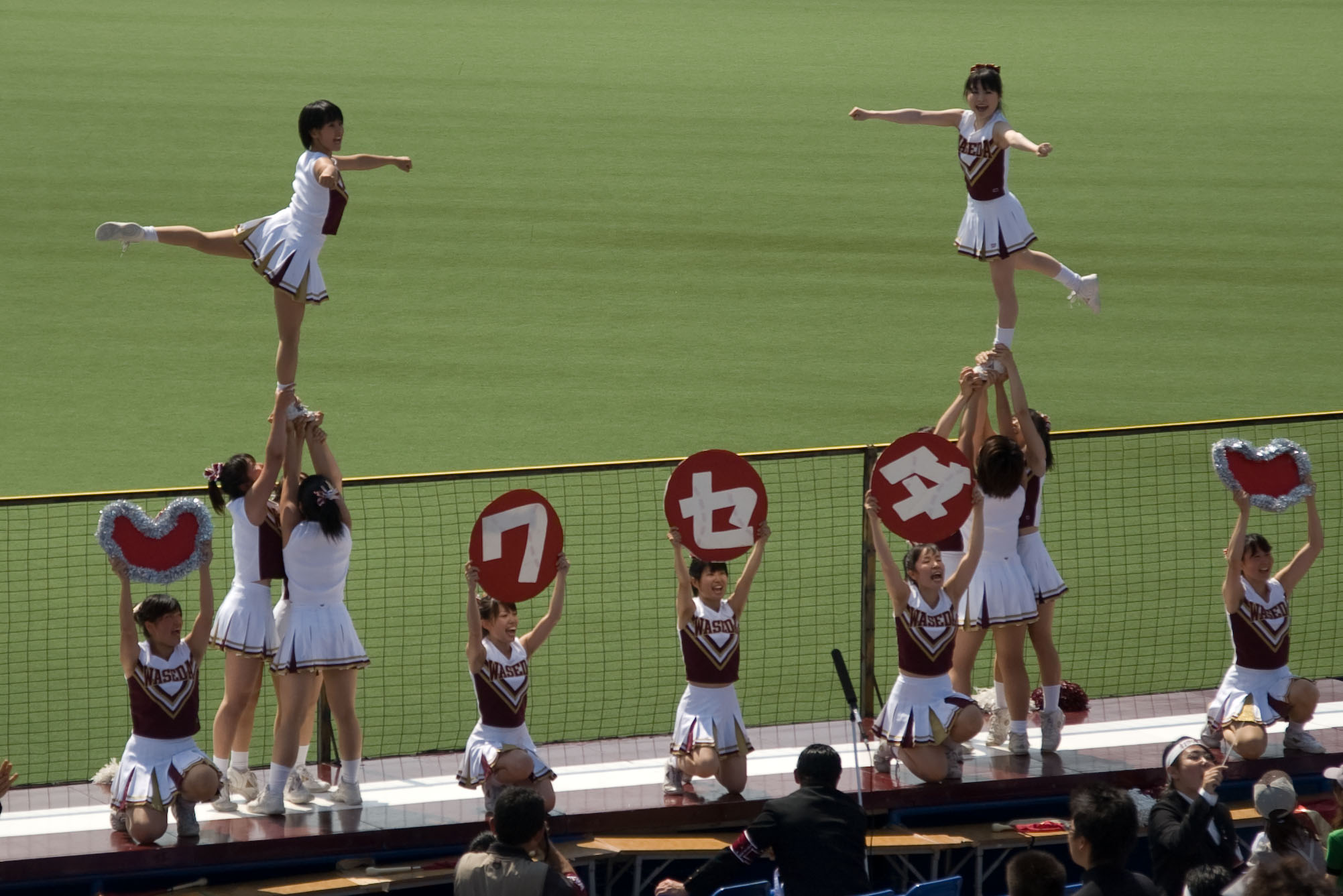
Cheerleaders performing at an athletic event.

The Waseda University Cheerleading Club (早稲田大学応援部, Waseda Daigaku Ōenbu) is the cheerleading club of Waseda University in Japan. It cheers for the sports clubs of Waseda University.

== History ==
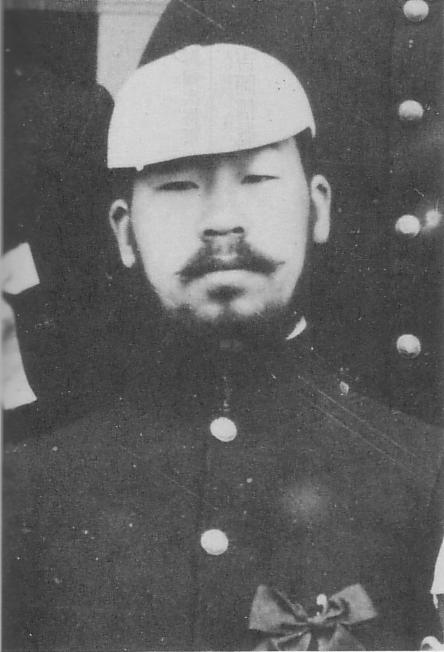
Shinkei Yoshioka, a head of the cheering club in the Meiji period

The club's first appearance featured Shinkei Yoshioka at the Waseda - Keio baseball match in 1905. The club broke up and reformed repeatedly. The official origin is marked as 1940.

== Organization ==
The university band is made up of three parts - leader, brass band and cheerleaders. The name of the team is "Big Bears". University authorities lend the university flags to the club to be hoisted only by the members. Only the members can lead students in singing the university anthem at an official event.

The club belongs to The Tokyo Big6 cheering party league.

== Alumnae association ==
The club's alumnae association is Waseda University Cheerleading Club Alumni Association（応援部稲門会 Ōenbu Tōmonkai. Their motto is: "Strong roots for a Beautiful flower". It is about the importance of practice and that the members must work in the background and must never be a hero.

== See also ==
- Fight song
