= Mitsurou Kubo =

Japanese manga artist and writer (born 1975)

Mitsurou Kubo 久保 ミツロウ
- Born: Mitsuko Kubo (久保 美津子); September 19, 1975 (age 51) Sasebo, Nagasaki Prefecture
- Areas: Manga artist, radio personality
- Notable works: Yuri on Ice; Moteki; Again!!

Mitsurou Kubo (久保 ミツロウ, Kubo Mitsurō) is the pen name of Mitsuko Kubo (久保 美津子, Kubo Mitsuko), a Japanese manga artist, writer, and radio personality. She is the co-creator of the 2016 anime series Yuri on Ice.

== Biography ==
Kubo was born on September 19, 1975, in Sasebo, Nagasaki Prefecture. As a child she developed an interest in anime and manga after reading her brother's copies of the enthusiast magazine Newtype. She reported reading forty manga magazines per month as a child, including Weekly Shōnen Jump, Ribon, Nakayoshi, and Hana to Yume. By first grade Kubo had decided to pursue manga as a career, and by fourth grade was drawing amateur manga. She cites the manga series Asari-chan by Mayumi Muroyama and High School! Kimengumi by Motoei Shinzawa among her early influences.

While in high school, Kubo exhibited her manga at a small local doujinshi convention. In her final year of high school she submitted an original manga work to a contest held by Nakayoshi, and won the Silver Award. After graduating high school, Kubo worked part time while attending classes for aspiring manga artists organized by Nakayoshi, where an editor told Kubo that manga artist Masashi Tanaka had praised her submissions. Shortly thereafter, Tanaka invited Kubo to move to Tokyo so they could collaborate on a manga series together; the resultant series, written by Tanaka and illustrated by Kubo, was ultimately rejected after being submitted to the magazines Shōjo Friend and Mimi.

While working as an artist's assistant to Mayumi Yoshida, Kubo was approached by editors at Mimi to write a three-part limited series for the magazine. In 1996, Kubo made her debut as a manga artist in Mimi with her series Shiawase 5 Han. Mimi folded in 1997 and Kubo transferred to its sister publication Kiss, but she struggled to write the romance stories that were typical of the magazine. A former editor at Mimi who moved to Weekly Shōnen Magazine invited Kubo to create a manga series for the magazine. 3.3.7 Byooshi!! was published in the magazine, and became Kubo's first shōnen manga (boys' manga) and her first manga published under the pen name "Mitsurou Kubo".

From 2008 to 2010, Kubo wrote the manga series Moteki, which was nominated for the Manga Taishō, followed by the manga series Again!! from 2011 to 2014. Following the conclusion of Again!!, Kubo met director Sayo Yamamoto, with whom she went on to co-create the 2016 anime series Yuri on Ice, contributing the original concept, original character designs, and initial script for the series.

Since 2012, Kubo and Mineko Nomachi have co-hosted Mitsuro Kubo & Mineko Nomachi's All Night Nippon, a block of the radio program All Night Nippon.

== Works ==
=== Manga ===
- Shiawase 5 Han (しあわせ5はん) (1996–1997)
- Yasuragi Tarento Andō-kun Monogatari Kurage (やすらぎタレント安藤君物語 くらげ) (1997–1998)
- 3.3.7 Byooshi!! (2001–2003)
- Tokkyuu!! (2004–2008)
- Moteki (2008–2010)
- Again!! (2011–2014)
- Yuri on Ice!!! Side Story: Welcome to the Madness (2017)

=== Anime ===
- Yuri on Ice (2016; co-creator, writer, and original character designer)
- Yuri on Ice the Movie: Ice Adolescence (cancelled; original story, screenwriter, and character designer)

=== Radio ===
- Mitsuro Kubo & Mineko Nomachi's All Night Nippon ZERO
- Mitsuro Kubo & Mineko Nomachi's All Night Nippon
- Mitsuro Kubo & Mineko Nomachi's All Night Nippon GOLD
