= Yuri on Ice =

2016 sports anime television series

- Cover of the first Blu-ray disc volume, featuring Yuri Katsuki (left) and Victor Nikiforov (right)

ユーリ!!! on ICE
- Genre: Sports (Figure skating)
- Created by: Sayo Yamamoto; Mitsurō Kubo
- Anime television series
- Directed by: Sayo Yamamoto; Jun Shishido (Note: Chief Episode Director (演出チーフ))
- Written by: Sayo Yamamoto (Note: Series Composition (シリーズ構成)); Mitsurō Kubo (Note: Original Scripts (脚本原案))
- Music by: Taro Umebayashi; Taku Matsushiba
- Studio: MAPPA
- Licensed by: Crunchyroll
- Original network: TV Asahi, BS Asahi, STS, NCC, SUN, AT-X
- Original run: October 6, 2016 – December 21, 2016
- Episodes: 12 + OVA
- Manga

Yuri on Ice Side Story: Welcome to the Madness
- Written by: Mitsurō Kubo
- Published by: Avex Group
- Published: May 26, 2017
- icon

Yuri on Ice (Japanese: ユーリ!!! on ICE; stylized as Yuri!!! on ICE) is a Japanese sports anime television series about figure skating. The series was produced by MAPPA, directed and written by Sayo Yamamoto with original scripts by Mitsurō Kubo under the chief episode direction of Jun Shishido. Character designs were handled by Tadashi Hiramatsu, and its music was composed by Taro Umebayashi and Taku Matsushiba. The figure skating was choreographed by Kenji Miyamoto, who also performed routines himself which were recorded and used as skating sound effects. The series premiered on October 6, 2016, and ended on December 22, 2016, with a total of 12 episodes. A Yuri on Ice feature film, Ice Adolescence, was originally planned for release in 2019, but has since been cancelled as of April 2024. The series revolves around the relationships between Japanese figure skater Yuri Katsuki; his idol, Russian figure-skating champion Victor Nikiforov; and up-and-coming Russian skater Yuri Plisetsky; as Yuri K. and Yuri P. take part in the Figure Skating Grand Prix, with Victor acting as coach to Yuri K.

Yuri on Ice has been well received in Japan. It won three awards at the Tokyo Anime Award Festival, a Japan Character Award, seven awards in the Crunchyroll's inaugural Anime Awards, and in 2019 was named by the website's editorial team as one of the top 25 anime of the 2010s. In Japan, the series was released in six parts on Blu-ray and DVD, with all the releases coming No. 1 on the Oricon Animation Blu-ray disc and Animation DVD disc rankings respectively. It was the eighth-most successful media franchise in Japan for 2017, had the second-highest combined Blu-ray and DVD sales of any anime in Japan for 2017, and had the highest combined sales for a TV anime that year. It was popular on social media outlets such as Tumblr, Sina Weibo and Twitter, where it received over a million more tweets than the next most-talked about anime series in the season it was broadcast. It also attracted praise from professional figure skaters, with some skaters in the 2018 Winter Olympics performing to music from the show.

Yuri on Ice has raised discussion concerning its depiction of a same-sex relationship between its protagonists, with some critics praising its depiction of anxiety, its covering of homosexuality in a way that differs from most anime and manga such as the yaoi genre, and for dealing with homosexuality in a country and sport that has present-day issues with homophobia. Others criticized its depiction for being unrealistic, and of visual censorship that arguably makes it ambiguous to some viewers.

== Plot ==
After a crushing defeat in the Grand Prix Final and other competition losses, 23-year-old Japanese figure skater Yuri Katsuki develops mixed feelings about skating and puts his career on hold; he returns to his hometown of Hasetsu in Kyushu after 5 years abroad. Yuri visits his childhood friend, Yuko, at an ice rink (Ice Castle Hasetsu) and perfectly mimics an advanced skating routine performed by his idol, Russian figure skating champion Victor Nikiforov. When secretly recorded footage of Yuri's performance is uploaded to the internet, it catches Victor's attention, and he travels to Kyushu with an offer to coach Yuri and revive his figure-skating career. It is later revealed that Victor was already familiar with Yuri, having met him before at a banquet where Yuri got drunk and asked Victor to be his coach.

After learning about Victor's career decision, Yuri Plisetsky, a rising 15-year-old Russian prodigy skater, travels to Hasetsu to make Victor keep a promise made prior to the beginning of the series; the two Yuris are referred to as Yuri K. and Yuri P. to distinguish each other. Victor had promised he would choreograph a routine specifically for Yuri P. if he won the Junior World Championships. Victor, having forgotten about his promise to Yuri P., makes the two Yuris compete against each other to decide who he will coach. He chooses two pieces for the skaters, both with the same melody but with a different meaning. The first piece, "Agape", about unconditional love, is given to Yuri P. The second piece, "Eros," about sexual love, is given to Yuri K. Yuri K.'s performance wins, and Victor becomes Yuri K.'s coach. Yuri P. returns to Russia, and both Yuris vow to win the Grand Prix championship.

Both Yuri K. and Yuri P. qualify to represent their countries in the Grand Prix series, and then later qualify for the Grand Prix Final in Barcelona. Over the course of the Grand Prix, Yuri K. and Victor become increasingly infatuated with each other, eventually leading to the two of them kissing in public. (Note: Written by Mitsurō Kubo. Directed by Sayo Yamamoto and Hirokazu Yamada (November 17, 2016). "Guranpurishirīzu kaimaku! Yatchaina Chūgoku taikai! Furī puroguramu" グランプリシリーズ開幕！やっチャイナ中国大会！フリープログラム [China's On! The Grand Prix Series Opening Event!! The Cup of China Free Skate]. Yuri on Ice. Episode 7.) Yuri K. buys them both gold rings in Barcelona, which leads to remarks by Victor about them being engaged. On the eve of the final, Yuri K. plans to quit skating so that Victor can return to the sport and tells Victor of his decision, but Victor tearfully rejects the idea, and they agree to choose their paths after the tournament has finished. The tournament ends with Yuri P. winning the gold medal and Yuri K. winning silver. As a result, Yuri K. decides to continue skating and moves to St. Petersburg so that he can continue to stay with Victor, and train alongside Yuri P.

== Production ==
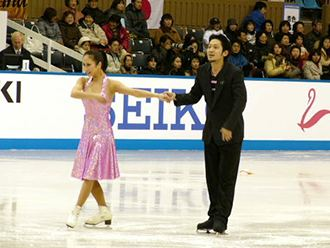
Kenji Miyamoto (right) provided the choreography for the series.

The original TV series of Yuri on Ice aired on TV Asahi from October 6 to December 22, 2016. The anime was produced by MAPPA, directed and written by Sayo Yamamoto using original scripts by Mitsurō Kubo under the supervision of Jun Shishido, with character designs by Tadashi Hiramatsu, music by Taro Umebayashi and Taku Matsushiba and figure-skating choreography by Kenji Miyamoto. The episodes were made available for streaming by Crunchyroll, and Funimation began streaming an English dub on October 24, 2016, at 10:00 p.m. ET. Six Blu-ray and DVD sets of Yuri on Ice were released in Japan. The first set, containing the first two episodes, was released on December 30, 2016. Each set includes bonus content such as booklets, production audio commentary and costume-design and choreography videos.

Yuri Katsuki's hometown of Hasetsu, Kyushu is based on Karatsu, Saga. In December 2016, Saga Prefecture's Sagaprise project announced plans to use Yuri on Ice to promote tourism in the area. According to Akinori Kawakami, president of the Association to Connect Hasetsu and Karatsu, 20 to 30 people visit Karatsu every day on anime pilgrimages. By May 2017, Yuri on Ice helped to attract 20,000 tourists from 27 countries to Karatsu. On February 22, 2017, the Nikkan Sports newspaper featured a collaborative illustration depicting Yuri K., Yuri P. and Victor supporting Sagan Tosu football club, which is based in Saga Prefecture.

According to a Sakuga Blog study, Yuri on Ice used more key animators than any other anime series during the fall 2016 season: an average of 48.5 key animators per episode, five more than Flip Flappers (which had the second-highest number of key animators). In the early episodes of the series, each character was handled by a different key animator, meaning that skating style of the characters differed from each other. In the skating scenes, the sound effects were changed to match each venue, according to the building's capacity and crowd size. The skating sounds for each sequence were recorded separately. No stock sounds were used for the sequences because each part sounds different, and no footage of professional skaters was used because the music in the programmes normally muffles the sounds. Thus the sounds used were recorded and performed by series choreographer Miyamoto, and each skating sequence is unique to the program.

== Related media ==
=== Music ===
Yuri on Ice official soundtracks

The opening theme, "History Maker" by Dean Fujioka, and ending theme, "You Only Live Once" by Wataru Hatano, were both released as singles. A compilation CD entitled Oh! SkaTra!!! Yuri!!! on ICE (Oh! スケトラ!!! ユーリ!!! on ICE), with the anime's 24 original songs, was released on December 21, 2016, and ranked #1 on Oricon's Weekly Digital Album Chart for the week of December 19–25. The insert song "Yuri on Ice" was included in Piano Solo Chū Jōkyū Figure Skate Meikyoku-shū ~Hyōjō ni Hibiku Melody~ 2016–2017, a piano book released on January 21, 2017, with music used by figure skaters (including Mao Asada and Yuzuru Hanyu). It was the only anime song in the music book release. An album of the TV soundtrack, the Yūtora/Yuri!!! on Ice Original Soundtrack Collection, was released on June 28, 2017. On November 19, 2017, the Yuri!!! on Concert took place at the Makuhari Messe with the Ensemble Fove conducted by Taro Umebayashi and Taku Matsushiba, the event was live-streamed on July 1, 2018, on YouTube and the CD was made available on November 20, 2018, it was released on streaming services on February 15, 2019.

=== Welcome to The Madness ===
A side story manga, Yuri on Ice Side Story: Welcome to The Madness, was published on May 26, 2017, as a bonus item included with the final Blu-Ray volume of the anime series. Written and illustrated by series co-creator Mitsurou Kubo, the manga follows Yuri P. and Otabek Altin the night after the Grand Prix Final. An original video animation also included with the Blu-Ray, Welcome to The Madness, depicts Yuri P.'s skate at the Grand Prix Final exhibition event.

=== Cancelled anime film ===
A Yuri on Ice original film was announced in April 2017 at the Yuri!!! on Stage exhibition event. The film's title, Yuri on Ice the Movie: Ice Adolescence (Yuri!!! on Ice Gekijō-ban: Ice Adolescence) was announced in July 2018 at the Yuri!!! on Concert event. The film was originally scheduled to be released in 2019, but was subsequently delayed. A teaser trailer depicting a young Viktor Nikiforov performing at the Winter Olympic Games was released in Japan in January 2019 as a part of a Yuri on Ice marathon event. The primary production staff from the Yuri on Ice TV series were expected to return for Ice Adolescence, including series creators Sayo Yamamoto and Mitsurō Kubo as the film's director and screenwriter, respectively. In November 2020, the same teaser trailer was released worldwide.

In April 2024, MAPPA announced through the Yuri!!! on Ice official Twitter account that Ice Adolescence had been cancelled.

== Reception ==
=== Critical reception and figure skating community ===
The series received positive reviews from critics and professional figure skaters. Among critics, in Anime News Network's "Best and Worst Anime of Fall 2016", five out of nine reviewers called Yuri on Ice the season's best show. In July 2017, the series was named by Eleanor Bley Griffiths of the Radio Times as one of the best anime TV series available to watch in the UK. From professionals, Yuri on Ice was well-received by figure skaters, including Johnny Weir, Evgenia Medvedeva, Denis Ten, Evgeni Plushenko, Masato Kimura, Ryuichi Kihara, Miu Suzaki, and Adam Rippon and included cameo appearances by skaters Nobunari Oda and Stéphane Lambiel. Weir said in an interview that: "I broke my rule about one episode per day because I physically couldn't stop watching." The closing scene of the tenth episode, when Yuri K. drunkenly pole dances, was also commended by professional pole dancers for its accuracy.

Yuri on Ice has also been praised for its direction. Critics have commented on Sayo Yamamoto's diverse range of characters. Brandon Teteruck of Crunchyroll commented: "Yamamoto is subtly crafting a work that embraces diversity and cultural acceptance. Yamamoto does not characterize the foreign skaters as ethnic stereotypes, but rather allows them to act and behave as their own people." Teteruck also claims that Yamamoto subverts traditional representations of gender, sexuality, and nationality. He highlights a scene in the sixth episode in which the Thai skater Phichit Chulanont skates to a piece of music referencing The King and I, of which the 1956 and 1999 film version are both banned in Thailand. However, the plot was criticised for being repetitive. The characters have received positive comment, primarily over the same-sex relationship between Yuri K. and Victor. Critics have praised the character of Yuri K. for being a realistic depiction of someone suffering from anxiety and as, "a textbook example of an unreliable narrator". Other characters were also praised, with James Beckett of Anime News Network calling Yuri P. one of 2016's best anime characters.

The quality of the animation received a mixed reception. The quality of the animation in early episodes was lauded by Clover Harker of the UK Anime Network, who said it was, "impressive". Kevin Cirugeda of Anime News Network commented that character designer Tadashi Hiramatsu was able to, "make it feel fresh, but also weirdly reminiscent of the past", comparing the series to FLCL. In later episodes however, there was criticism of the animation skating routines, with one describing it as, "at times painful, or perhaps embarrassing to watch", while another said that the poor animation was the fault of Yamamoto's over-ambition. The music gained positive comment, especially the opening theme tune to the series, "History Maker". Ian Wolf of Anime UK News commented on its rousing theme; the use of English connecting to the show's international feel; and the use of both unusual musical instruments such a xylophone in the introduction and of a 6/8 time signature, arguably make the song a fast waltz and thus a dance akin to ballet. "History Maker" was played in the opening ceremony of the 2017–18 Grand Prix of Figure Skating Final in Nagoya. In the 2018 Winter Olympics, Kihara and Suzaki performed to the piano version of "Yuri on Ice", Yuri Katsuki's Free Skating Program track, from the Oh! SkaTra!!! Yuri!!! on ICE soundtrack, in the figure skating team event pairs competition.

=== Awards ===
In Crunchyroll's inaugural Anime Awards, Yuri on Ice received awards in all of its seven nomination categories: Best Boy (Yuri K.), Best Animation, Most Heartwarming Scene ("The Kiss", episode seven), Best Couple (Yuri K. and Victor), Best Opening, Best Ending, and Anime of the Year; it is the only occurrence for an anime series to receive a highest "clean sweep" in Crunchyroll history. Although some Crunchyroll users complained that the show won awards it did not deserve, notably the award for Best Animation, and accused fans of Yuri on Ice of rigging the vote, others defended the awards, writing that there was no conclusive evidence to prove this, while Crunchyroll stated on Twitter that they had used strong anti-cheating methods. Kun Gao, the general manager and founder of Crunchyroll, wrote "We are thrilled that Yuri!!! on Ice has both captivated passionate anime fans and introduced new viewers to anime, and we are privileged to have had the opportunity to distribute this amazing property to its many viewers outside Japan". In 2019, Crunchyoll's editorial team named Yuri on Ice one of the top 25 anime of the 2010s. Ian Wolf of Anime UK News also picked the series for his list of "best anime of 2010s". Yuri on Ice was listed by Looper as one of the best anime of the 2010s. When reviewing the US Blu-Ray release of the series for Anime News Network, Jacob Chapman commented on the criticism Yuri on Ice received when it won the Anime Awards. He wrote that some people argued the fans were drawn to the anime as a form of escapism following the political events of 2016 among other factors, but he responded to this saying that:

The problem with this reductive view is that it assumes Yuri!!! on Ice is anywhere near as lightweight and fluffy as its sparkly cover art might suggest. (It's also just a gilded version of the more common "only horny fangirls care about this" argument, meant to delegitimize the show's audience and therefore its merits as a work of art.)

At the Tokyo Anime Award Festival in 2017, Yuri on Ice won Animation of the Year: Television Category and the fan-polled Anime Fan Award. Character designer Tadashi Hiramatsu won the award for Best Animator. In the 2017 Japan Character Awards presented by the Character Brand Licensing Association (CBLA), Yuri on Ice won the Japan Character Grand Prize New Face Award. The CBLA gave the show the prize for taking an unusual subject like figure skating and making it appeal to audiences, especially women, and predicted the show, "can continue to grow on a global level.

Year	Award	Category	Recipient	Result	Ref.
2017	1st Crunchyroll Anime Awards	Anime of the Year	Yuri!!! on ICE	Won	
2017	1st Crunchyroll Anime Awards	Best Boy	Yuri Katsuki	Won	
2017	1st Crunchyroll Anime Awards	Best Opening	"History Maker" by Dean Fujioka	Won	
2017	1st Crunchyroll Anime Awards	Best Ending	"You Only Live Once" by Wataru Hatano	Won	
2017	1st Crunchyroll Anime Awards	Best Animation	Yuri!!! on Ice	Won	
2017	1st Crunchyroll Anime Awards	Best Couple	Yuri Katsuki and Victor Nikiforov	Won	
2017	1st Crunchyroll Anime Awards	Most Heartwarming Scene	"The Kiss" Episode 7	Won	
2017	IGN Awards	Best Anime Series	Yuri!!! on Ice	Nominated	
2017	IGN Awards	Best Anime Opening	"History Maker" by Dean Fujioka	Won	
2017	16th Tokyo Anime Award	Animation of the Year (TV)	Yuri!!! on Ice	Won	
2017	16th Tokyo Anime Award	Best Animator	Tadashi Hiramatsu	Won	
2017	16th Tokyo Anime Award	Anime Fan Award	Yuri!!! on Ice	Won	
2017	24th AnimeLand Grand Prix	Best Anime - People's Choice	Yuri!!! on Ice	Won	
2017	24th AnimeLand Grand Prix	Best Theme Song	"History Maker" by Dean Fujioka	Won	
2017	Japan Expo Awards	Daruma d'Or Anime	Yuri!!! on Ice	Nominated	
2017	Japan Expo Awards	Daruma for Best Simulcast	Yuri!!! on Ice	Won	
2017	39th Anime Grand Prix	Grand Prix	Yuri!!! on Ice	2nd place	
2017	39th Anime Grand Prix	Best Male Character	Victor Nikiforov	Won	
2017	39th Anime Grand Prix	Best Male Character	Yuri Katsuki	7th place	
2017	39th Anime Grand Prix	Best Male Character	Yuri Plisetsky	9th place	
2017	39th Anime Grand Prix	Best Theme Song	"History Maker" by Dean Fujioka	Won	
2017	39th Anime Grand Prix	Best Voice Actor	Junichi Suwabe	5th place	
2017	22nd Association of Media in Digital Awards	Excellence Award	Yuri!!! on Ice	Won	
2017	9th Japan Character Awards	New Face Award	Yuri!!! on Ice	Won	
2017	12th AnimaniA Awards	Best Online Anime	Yuri!!! on Ice	2nd place	
2017	7th Newtype Anime Awards	Best Work (TV)	Yuri!!! on Ice	6th place	
2017	7th Newtype Anime Awards	Best Director	Sayo Yamamoto	6th place	
2017	7th Newtype Anime Awards	Best Screenplay	Sayo Yamamoto and Mitsurō Kubo	6th place	
2017	7th Newtype Anime Awards	Best Male Character	Victor Nikiforov	4th place	
2017	7th Newtype Anime Awards	Best Male Character	Yuri Katsuki	6th place	
2017	7th Newtype Anime Awards	Best Character Design	Tadashi Hiramatsu and Mitsurō Kubo	6th place	
2017	7th Newtype Anime Awards	Best Theme Song	"History Maker" by Dean Fujioka	3rd place	
2017	7th Newtype Anime Awards	Best Soundtrack	Yuri!!! on Ice	4th place	
2017	7th Newtype Anime Awards	Best Character (Mascot)	Makkachin	3rd place	
2017	23rd Saló del Manga de Barcelona	Best Anime Series Broadcast in Spain	Yuri!!! on Ice	Won	
2018	22nd Asian Television Awards	Best 2D Animated Programme	Yuri!!! on Ice	Nominated	
2018	8th Location Japan Awards	Special Award (Tourism)	Karatsu City, Saga Prefecture × Yuri!!! on Ice	Won	
2018	17th Tokyo Anime Award	Anime Fan Award	Yuri!!! on Ice	Won	
2018	12th Seiyu Awards	Best Lead Actor	Toshiyuki Toyonaga as Yuri Katsuki	Won	
2018	12th Seiyu Awards	Best Supporting Actor	Junichi Suwabe as Victor Nikiforov	Won	
2018	Japan Expo Awards	Daruma d'Or Anime	Yuri!!! on Ice	Nominated	
2018	Japan Expo Awards	Daruma for Best Original Series	Yuri!!! on Ice	Won	
2018	Japan Expo Awards	Daruma for Best Scenario	Sayo Yamamoto and Mitsurō Kubo	Won	
2018	Japan Expo Awards	Daruma for Best Original Soundtrack	Taro Umebayashi and Taku Matsushiba	Nominated	

=== Popularity ===
The anime has attracted a large online following. According to the Kadokawa Ascii Research Laboratories content and information trend-analytics company, Yuri on Ice was the most-tweeted anime of the season (collecting 1,440,596 tweets). It had over a million tweets more than its closest rival, the volleyball-based anime Haikyu!! (which had 348,109 tweets). Since it started to include anime and manga in their statistics, Tumblr Fandometrics revealed that Yuri on Ice was the most talked about anime on their website starting as of May 1, 2017. It was also the fourth most talked about anime on Tumblr in 2016. Yuri on Ice was listed as the top 2016 anime on Crunchyroll for Poland, the Czech Republic, Sierra Leone, Burkina Faso, Malawi, Botswana, Taiwan, the Philippines, Vietnam, Laos, and Singapore; the most popular 2016 anime series for all countries via Crunchyroll was Re:Zero. Yuri on Ice was one of the three most watched anime on Crunchyroll, the others being JoJo's Bizarre Adventure: Diamond Is Unbreakable and the third season of Sailor Moon Crystal, and was also named the series "Most likely to be watched within an hour of release". A poll of 306,568 viewers by the video-hosting service Nico Nico Douga found that Yuri on Ice was the fourth-most-popular TV anime series of the year and the most popular series overall with women, who made up 34 percent of those polled. At the Tokyo Anime Award Festival, an online poll was conducted to construct a list of top 100 anime (10 films and 90 TV anime series) for the year, in which Yuri on Ice topped the TV list with 64,774 out of 480,004 votes. It would later win the festival's Anime Fan Award from a second fan polling based on the 100 nominees.

In a "mega poll" of 19,560 readers for Best Anime of 2016 by Anime News Network, Yuri on Ice finished first with 7,400 votes (37.8 percent of the total). A top-100 poll of users of the Japanese website 2chan named Yuri on Ice the tenth-best anime of 2016. A poll by mobile phone operator NTT DoCoMo of 4,800 users named Yuri on Ice "Most Favourite TV Anime of 2016" and the "Most Moe" series, while another poll by the same company revealed the tenth episode was the eighth most popular "Swimsuit" episode of anime as chosen by women. A poll of 941 voters on the Japanese anime news aggregator AnimeAnime named Yuri on Ice the best anime of the fall 2016 season. Receiving 20 percent of the female vote, it was the eighth-most-popular show among men. An Akiba Souken poll named the series the most satisfactory anime of fall 2016. A poll by Animage magazine of the top 100 anime characters of 2016 ranked Victor first, Yuri K. second and Yuri P. sixth. According to a Charapedia poll, Victor was 2016's fourth-most-attractive anime character; Yuri K. finished 12th and Yuri P. 19th in the poll. In an Anime News Network poll asking people which male anime characters they would most like to give Valentine's Day chocolates to, Victor came top and Yuri K. came second. Another poll reported that women considered the first and fourth episodes of the series to be the best anime episodes set at hot springs, while a different Anime News Network poll said that the first episode was the best anime episode set in a hot spring. In 2017, there were over 20 dedicated Yuri on Ice dōjinshi events planned in Japan. An all-night screening of the series and a talk show with writer Mitsurou Kubo and voice actors Toshiyuki Toyonaga, Junichi Suwabe, and Kōki Uchiyama (the voices of Yuri K., Victor and Yuri P., respectively) was held on February 11 at the TOHO cinema in Roppongi Hills, and was relayed live to 47 cinemas in Japan. A screening of the first three episodes was held by the Tokyo Anime Award Festival on March 11, 2017, at Cinema Sunshine in Ikebukuro, Tokyo. The anime contains references to, and has been referenced by, western animation and comics. In the animated series South Park, the episode "The End of Serialization as We Know It", Ike Broflovski's browser history indicates that he searched for the show. The twelfth episode of Yuri on Ice includes a flashback in which a young J.J. Leroy is dressed to resemble South Park's Eric Cartman. Yuri on Ice is also referenced in the Steven Universe comic by Melanie Gillman and Katy Farina: in the fourth volume, Yuri K., Yuri P., Victor and minor character Otabek Altin are depicted visiting a renaissance faire in Beach City. Two cafés themed around the series have been established in Tokyo: The first was created in December 2016 in Ikebukuro, and the second was established in May 2017 in Shibuya, and is planned to run until July 2, 2017.

On May 29, 2026, the Yuri!!! on ICE Production Committee announced the upcoming release of a 10th year anniversary Blu-ray and CD which fans could begin to pre-order at the time of the announcement, the full release is set to be December 23. The boxset includes the full series, bonus footage, music, and a collaborative video with skater Stéphane Lambiel. The announcement also came a newly drawn visual from Yoshishi Hiramatsu. In addition to the boxset, a large scale exhibition was announced to be held during the winter of 2026, with a to be announced date.

=== Sales ===
Yuri on Ice sales have been high. In the first half of 2017 it was the second-most successful media franchise in Japan, taking ¥3,262,936,824 from sales in home video and music releases. It was released in Japan on Blu-Ray and DVD across six volumes, with each release topping that Oricon Animation Blu-Ray disc ranking and the Oricon Animation DVD disc ranking respectively. The first Blu-Ray edition of Yuri on Ice topped the Oricon Animation Blu-Ray disc ranking for two weeks, and was number two in the Oricon general Blu-Ray disc ranking, behind SMAP's Clip! SMAP! Complete Singles. The first DVD edition topped the Oricon DVD Animation ranking, above limited and standard editions of One Piece Film: Gold, and was number two in the Oricon general DVD ranking. Oricon later raises the first week sales into 50,878 copies. The second Blu-Ray and DVD sets also topped the Oricon charts for two weeks. The third Blu-Ray and DVD collections also topped of the Oricon charts, with the DVD topping the chart for two weeks and Blu-Ray for one week. The fourth Blu-Ray and DVD collections topped the Oricon Blu-Ray and DVD charts of a week. The fifth Blu-Ray collection stayed at No. 1 the Oricon Blu-Ray chart for two weeks and the DVD chart for one week. The sixth DVD and Blu-Ray release was promoted with a deleted scene from the series featuring Yuri P. and Otabek skating in the Barcelona exhibition event, which in the broadcast version of the series only shows Yuri K. and Victor skating at the event. The sixth Blu-Ray and DVD releases also topped the Oricon charts. For the first half of 2017, Yuri on Ice had the highest combined DVD and Blu-Ray sales of any animated series in Japan. By the end of 2017, Yuri on Ice was the eighth top-selling media franchise in Japan. All six Blu-Ray releases appeared in the top 50 of the top-selling animation Blu-Rays discs, and all six DVD releases appeared in the top 100 of the top-selling animation DVDs of 2017. Combined Blu-Ray and DVD sales resulted in Yuri on Ice being the top-selling TV anime of 2017, and the second top-selling anime overall behind the anime film Your Name.

On February 6, 2018, Funimation released the series in the United States on a combined DVD and Blu-Ray boxset, with extras including textless opening and closing, trailers, commentary from the 11th episode, and the "Welcome to the Madness" original video anime. There is also a limited-edition version including a chipboard collector's box with "cracked ice" holographic finish and silver foil, three art cards, and an 80 page book of illustrations and behind-the-scenes interviews with Sayo Yamamoto, Mitsurou Kubo, and Kenji Miyamoto. Funimation is also releasing the series in the United Kingdom and Ireland through their distributors at Sony Pictures UK, and in Australia and New Zealand through Universal Sony. The anime's opening song, "History Maker" by Dean Fujioka, reached number 43 on the Billboard Japan Hot 100 chart. It was named the best opening theme by four of eight Anime News Network critics, and received the Best Opening award at the 2016 The Anime Awards. The ending song, "You Only Live Once" by Wataru Hatano, peaked at number 11 on the Billboard Japan Hot 100 and received the Best Ending award at the 2016 The Anime Awards. The Oh! SkaTra!!! Yuri!!! on ICE soundtrack was number three on Oricon's CD chart in its first week of sales, and topped Oricon's digital-album chart. The album also became the top selling anime CD album on the Oricon charts for the first half of 2017. By the end of 2017, Oh! SkaTra!!! Yuri!!! on ICE was the fourth best-selling anime CD album of the year, while the Yūtora/Yuri!!! on Ice Original Soundtrack Collection was the 30th best selling anime CD of 2017.

=== Depiction of same-sex relationship ===
==== Praise ====
The "kiss" in episode 7 between Victor Nikiforov (left) and Yuri Katsuki (right); although critics and fans accept it as a kiss, its ambiguity leaves the decision up to the viewer. In the official fanbook, director Sayo Yamamoto stated that she faced censorship in regards to the kiss.

Yuri on Ice was praised for including a same-sex romantic relationship between Yuri K. and Victor. Among moments highlighted by critics are an apparent kiss in the seventh episode, an exchange of gold rings (indicating a marriage or engagement) in the tenth episode, and Victor's tears when Yuri suggests ending their partnership in the twelfth episode. The kiss won the 2016 Crunchyroll Anime Awards for Most Heartwarming Scene. The exchange of rings between Yuri K. and Victor in the tenth episode is considered the first time such a relationship has been depicted in anime. Gabriella Ekens wrote for Anime News Network, "Yuri on Ice, in depicting a sincere and uncomplicated engagement between two dudes, is unprecedented in anime. Japan does not recognize same-sex marriage, so the show is depicting something that isn't legally possible in its country of origin". For Anime UK News, Ian Wolf called the exchange of rings "the best scene in the series". According to Wolf, the anime is an example of the Odagiri effect.

Yuri on Ice has highlighted homophobia in figure skating and other areas; the seventh episode features a flashback in which a younger Victor performs in a costume based on those worn by openly gay figure skater Johnny Weir, who was subject to homophobic comments throughout his career. Weir said in an interview with The Geekiary,

I think all positive imagery of LGBT themes in sport are good. Unfortunately, the majority of people that rule the skating world are conservative and more business minded. I think many of them, while they may love and appreciate the art and the sport, are more interested in the business side of things or power trips. I don't know if Yuri on Ice will be able to change the perception of gay athletes to a 60 year old businessman, but I am of the school of thought that every little bit helps.

The series finale features a scene in which Yuri K. and Victor skate together at an exhibition event; something which has not yet occurred in actual competition. Critics have noted that the series depicts two characters from countries with problems concerning LGBT rights.

Yuri on Ice differs from other anime covering same-sex relationships, such as yaoi and yuri. Carli Velocci of Geek.com wrote,

Their relationship exists somewhere beyond any sexuality, meaning it doesn't fall into the same traps that a lot of yuri and yaoi relationships do ... While this isn't the first anime with a same-sex couple at the forefront, it's one of the first to present a story that isn't strictly sexual and is mutual. Yuri and Victor complement each other, but both also admit that they've grown as people because of the presence of the other. The equality in their relationship is revolutionary, even if it wasn't the first to depict one. You can assign the "seme" or "uke" label to Victor and Yuri, but when it comes to their psychological bond, it's more equal ... Yuri and Victor aren't just another gay anime couple. They're almost real.

A review in Otaku USA has argued that the skaters take on an androgynous appearance when they are performing, saying:

While on ice in the series proper, the main performers often take on an androgynous appearance to feed the show's substance. Yuri's evolution in terms of confidence and capabilities is at the core of the plot, but the heart lies in Yuri's exploration of his feminine side via emotional expression. ... Gender roles are further addressed via Viktor's [sic] lines of encouragement to Yuri that, at least as translated, imply both skating direction and romantic suggestion.

==== Criticism ====
The relationship has also been criticized as unrealistic, with Yuri K. and Victor not receiving the homophobic abuse they would experience in real life. Others have remarked that some viewers might refuse to acknowledge the relationship because the homosexuality was not explicit. Although the "kiss" is obscured by Victor's arm, it is implicit. Cecilia D'Anastasio of Kotaku wondered why the "kiss" was blocked when other anime, such as From the New World, had depicted gay kisses. Wolf of Anime UK News originally said of the scene that: "I'm 99.999% sure the kiss did occur, but that 0.001% is horribly getting to me. I don't want to go by what everyone else sees – I want to see what is actually going on, and share in the reaction of the characters at the same time as them". However, by the twelfth episode, he said that the scene in which Victor cries was the proof he wanted:

If the kiss is the initial spark, and the rings the visible sign of love, then the tears are proof that you don't want it to end. I have been saying all the time that what I wanted was text rather than subtext – but in end, I think the subtext did actually pay off.
