= List of Yuri on Ice characters =

This is a list of primary characters from the anime series Yuri on Ice. Most of them are characters taking part in the ISU Grand Prix of Figure Skating championship, with the central figures being Japanese figure skater Yuri Katsuki, his Russian coach Viktor Nikiforov, and Yuri's Russian rival skater Yuri Plisetsky.

== Main characters ==
(Japan) Yuri Katsuki (勝生 勇利, Katsuki Yūri)
Voiced by: Toshiyuki Toyonaga (Japanese); Jessie James Grelle (English)
The main protagonist, Yuri is a 23-year-old (24 after episode 9) figure skater. Yuri began skating at a very young age and aspires to become a great figure skater like his idol, Victor Nikiforov. As stated by his teacher Minako, Yuri is not a prodigy at skating, but his skills were honed by rigorous training, which also grants him good stamina. He is Japan's top figure skater; his greatest skating assets are his peculiar sense of rhythm and unique step. However, Yuri succumbs to pressure easily following the death of his pet poodle Victor. After failing during his first appearance at the Grand Prix Final, his self-confidence was greatly affected, leading to extreme anxiety and poor performances in following competitions. Dispirited, he returns to his home in Kyushu after 5 years abroad.
Yuri is kind, sensitive, and mild-mannered; he is also introverted and has a hard time opening himself up to others, preferring to be alone and practice ballet or ice skating than socializing with his peers. Despite having a lot of support from his family and friends, he greatly lacks self-esteem and is easily discouraged, causing bouts of anxiety. Contrary to how Yuri sees himself due to his past failures, he is still considered Japan's best skater, having the loyal support of his fans and the juniors skaters that look up to him, much to his bewilderment. Under Victor's tutelage, Yuri slowly becomes more self-assured and confident, aiming to reinvent himself and putting more input into his programs as he strives to win the 2016–2017 Grand Prix series.
(Russia) Victor Nikiforov (ヴィクトル・ニキフォロフ, Vikutoru Nikiforofu)
Voiced by: Junichi Suwabe (Japanese); Jerry Jewell (English)
Viktor is a 27-year-old figure skating genius and living legend from Russia who Yuri Katsuki has idolized since he was a child. Starting as a teenager, Victor has won numerous competitions, including winning five consecutive Grand Prix Finals, following a string of victories in Nationals and the European Figure Skating Championships. At the start of the series, Victor wins the 2015–2016 World Championships marking him winning it consecutively five times and people begin to question what he will do next season, as he is approaching the retirement age for figure skaters. Victor's personal motto is, "Live, Laugh, Love!" He shows this through his skating programs, as he creates his own choreography and music. However, he lost his inspiration to invent new routines because he knows people have grown used to his record-breaking talent. After seeing Yuri skating his winning routine in the viral video, Victor regains his inspiration and decides to become his coach to unlock his full potential.
As the top skater in the world, Victor is very popular and charismatic, as well as being flirtatious and liking to speak his mind. As stated by Yakov, Victor does whatever he wants and often gives off a whimsical, carefree attitude. When he needs to be, Viktor can be serious and contemplative, especially in regards to skating. As a coach, Viktor is very patient and supportive, yet he challenges and helps push Yuri K. into exploring his untapped potential and charm. In his day-to-day life, he is a carefree and romantic person. He also owns a dog named Makkachin, who strongly resembles Yuri's late Victor, although Makkachin is a bit bigger.
Although his career is based on Evgeni Plushenko, Victor's design is modeled after that of American actor John Cameron Mitchell. Mitchell is most known as the book writer and original star of Hedwig and the Angry Inch, which series creator Mitsuro Kubo had seen on Broadway with Mitchell in the lead while she was deciding on Victor's appearance.
Viktor also pays homage to real life skater Johnny Weir in episode 7 with his costume and rose crown.
(Russia) Yuri Plisetsky (ユーリ・プリセツキー, Yūri Purisetsukī)
Voiced by: Kōki Uchiyama (Japanese); Micah Solusod (English)
Yuri is a 15-year-old Russian figure skater and a rink mate to Viktor Nikiforov. Yuri has been a figure skating prodigy since he was young and has won two consecutive Junior Grand Prix Final and Junior World Championships. He won first place in the junior circuit during the year Yuri K. lost in his first Grand Prix Final. Due to the fact that he surpasses his peer group, Yuri is arrogant and his harsh personality earned him the nicknamed "Russian Punk," though he is also known as the "Russian Fairy" because of his good looks. During his stay in Japan, he is given the nickname "Yurio" by Mari Katsuki to differentiate him from Yuri Katsuki.
Although Yuri is typically crude and short-tempered, he also shows a kind side, though he shows it in an abrasive way. He has a strong fondness for cats and any feline-related merchandise, which included the fact he has a cat named Potya, full name Puma Tiger Scorpion. Yuri is very ambitious and wants to make the most of his skating career while he can, being at a precarious age where his abilities will dampen as his body matures. According to the producer, Yuri P. is likely to be based on Yulia Lipnitskaya.

== Supporting characters ==
=== Katsuki family ===
(Japan) Toshiya Katsuki (勝生 利也, Katsuki Toshiya)
Voiced by: Soryu Konno (Japanese); Charles Campbell (English)
Toshiya is the 54-year-old father of Yuri Katsuki and Mari, and the owner of Yu-topia Akatsuki, the hot springs resort that his family runs together.
(Japan) Hiroko Katsuki (勝生 寛子, Katsuki Hiroko)
Voiced by: Kei Hayami (Japanese); Rachel Robinson (English)
Hiroko is the 49-year-old mother of Yuri and Mari, and Toshiya's wife. She is kind and welcoming and helps runs Yu-topia with the rest of her family.
(Japan) Mari Katsuki (勝生 真利, Katsuki Mari)
Voiced by: Kyōko Sakai (Japanese); Leah Clark (English)
Mari is Yuri Katsuki's 30-year-old sister and helps run Yu-topia alongside the rest of her family. During Yuri P.'s visit to Japan, she was the one who nicknamed him "Yurio", due to his resemblance to a boyband member she likes, in order to distinguish between him and her brother.

=== Nishigōri family ===
(Japan) Yuko Nishigōri (西郡 優子, Nishigōri Yūko)
Voiced by: Mariya Ise (Japanese); Alexis Tipton (English)
A 25-year-old woman, Yuko is Yuri K.'s best friend, and former rink mate. She has always treated Yuri with kindness and offers him encouragement about his skating career. Yuko is the one who first showed Victor's skating performances to Yuri, and the two of them greatly admired him from a young age, regularly copying his routines during their practices. Yuri pulls himself out of his slump by practicing Victor's latest routine so he can show it to Yuko when he returns to Kyushu. Yuko is married to another mutual childhood friend and ex-rink mate of Yuri's, Takeshi, and they have triplet daughters. Yuko and her family run the local ice rink, Ice Castle Hasetsu, where she and her friends learned to skate as children.
(Japan) Takeshi Nishigōri (西郡 豪, Nishigōri Takeshi)
Voiced by: Jun Fukuyama (Japanese); Cris George (English)
A 24-year-old man, Takeshi is Yuri K.'s childhood friend and ex-rink mate. He is married to Yuko, another childhood friend that skated with him and Yuri, and is the father of Axel, Lutz, and Loop. He helps his wife run the local ice rink, Ice Castle Hasetsu, where the three learned to skate as children. Although he has a history of teasing Yuri when they were children, Takeshi is very supportive of Yuri, and often gives practical, blunt advice to him.
(Japan) Axel Nishigōri (西郡 空挧流, Nishigōri Akuseru) Lutz Nishigōri (西郡 流譜, Nishigōri Ruttsu) Loop Nishigōri (西郡 流麗, Nishigōri Rūpu)
Voiced by: Akiko Yajima (Japanese); Lara Woodhull (Axel), Kristi Rothrock (Lutz), Kristen McGuire (Loop) (English)
Axel, Lutz, and Loop are the six-year-old triplet daughters of Takeshi and Yuko, and each of them are named after a type of figure skating jump (Axel jump, Lutz jump, and Loop jump). They are big fans of figure skating and very active on social media, with their Instagram being "sukeota3sisters". They are very mischievous and are the ones responsible for secretly recording and posting Yuri K.'s performance of Victor's routine on the Internet via their mother's YouTube account without permission. They can be told apart by their hairstyles and color-coded outfits; Axel has pigtails and wears purple, Lutz has a bun and wears light blue, and Loop has a ponytail and wears pink.

=== Coaches and other characters ===
(Japan) Minako Okukawa (奥川 ミナコ, Okukawa Minako)
Voiced by: Yuka Komatsu (Japanese); Colleen Clinkenbeard (English)
Minako is Yuri Katsuki's ballet teacher and owner of the local dance studio in Hasetsu. She is currently lacking students, aside for Yuri K., who she still helps in his training. She was once a famous dancer herself and a teacher that traveled around the world to teach others the art of ballet. Minako also runs a small snack bar called Kachu.
(Japan) Hisashi Morooka (諸岡 久志, Morooka Hisashi)
Voiced by: Taihei Katō (TV Asahi Announcer) (Japanese); Sonny Strait (English)
Morooka is a 27-year-old figure skating enthusiast and an announcer at many of the competitions. He's a fan of Yuri K. and encourages him to continue with his career after his defeat in his first Grand Prix Final.
(Russia) Yakov Feltsman (ヤコフ・フェルツマン, Yakofu Ferutsuman)
Voiced by: Hideaki Tezuka (Japanese); Daman Mills (English)
A 70-year-old man, Yakov is Yuri Plisetsky's, Georgi Popovich's, Mila Babicheva's, and formerly Victor Nikiforov's figure skating coach. A no-nonsense man that is strict with his students, Yakov is easily angered by Victor's whimsical behavior, including his choice to leave Russia to train Yuri K., and Yuri P.'s dismissive attitude towards his advice. However, he is a good coach who is very fond of his students and wishes for each of them reach their full potential. He is the first Jewish character to be introduced in anime.
(Russia) Lilia Baranovskaya (リリア・バラノフスカヤ, Riria Baranofusukaya)
Voiced by: Seiko Tamura (Japanese); Caitlin Glass (English)
A stern and strict woman, Lilia is a former Prima ballerina from Bolshoi Ballet and Yakov's ex-wife, with whom she has a professional relationship (However, it might be implied that Yakov still has some feelings for her). After Yuri P.'s return to Russia following his loss to Yuri K., Yakov asks Lilia to train Yuri P. in ballet to help him improve his skills. She is currently housing Yuri P. at her home.
(United States) Celestino Cialdini (チェレスティーノ・チャルディーニ, Cheresutīno Charudīni)
Voiced by: Kōji Ochiai (Japanese); Ian Sinclair (English)
A 45-year-old Italian-American, Celestino is Yuri K.'s former figure skating coach from when he was training at the Detroit Skating Club, and Phichit Chulanont's current coach. After Yuri's loss at his first Grand Prix Final, Yuri ended his contract with Celestino and returned home to Japan. When he heard Victor took Yuri as his pupil, Celestino shows no ill-will towards this development and encourages Yuri throughout his second Grand Prix series. A good and understanding coach to his current and former pupils, Celestino takes pride seeing them succeed. He is affectionately nicknamed "Ciao Ciao" by Phichit, due to using the words frequently to greet other people.
(Russia) Nikolai Plisetsky (ニコライ "コーリャ"・プリセツキー, Nikorai "Kōrya" Purisetsukī)
Voiced by: Misao Kobayashi
Nikolai is Yuri Plisetsky's grandfather who lives in Moscow and the only person that Yuri shows his soft side to. Kolya is very loving and supportive towards his grandson and used to accompany him to his skating lessons when he was younger.
(Japan) Kanako Odagaki (小田垣 香奈子, Odagaki Kanako)
Voiced by: Yuki Kazu (Japanese); Bryn Apprill (English)
Kanako is Kenjirō Minami's figuring skating coach and trains at the Hakata Skate Club with him. She acts motherly towards Minami and is shown to be rather indulgent of his enthusiasm.
(Czech Republic) Josef Karpisek (ヨゼフ・カルピーシェク, Yozefu Karupīsheku)
Voiced by: Tomisaburou Horikoshi
Josef is Christophe Giacometti's coach, being with him since he was young, and understands his student's habits well, such as letting Christophe go at his own pace in competitions.
(Canada) Alain Leroy (アラン・ルロワ, Aran Rurowa)
Voiced by: Atsuo Hasegawa
Alain is Jean-Jacques Leroy's father, coach, and a former Ice Dance Olympic Champion alongside his wife.
(Canada) Nathalie Leroy (ナタリー・ルロワ, Natarii Rurowa)
Voiced by: Kujira
Nathalie is Jean-Jacques Leroy's mother, coach, and a former Ice Dance Olympic Champion alongside her husband.
(Canada) Isabella Yang (イザベラ・ヤン, Izabera Yan)
Voiced by: Yuki Kazu (Japanese); Dawn M. Bennett (English)
Isabella is Jean-Jacques Leroy's supportive and loyal fiancée and a member of his fan club, JJ Girls.
(South Korea) Min-soo Park (パク・ミンソ, Paku Minso; 박민수)
Voiced by: Miyako Chida
Min-soo is Seung Gil Lee's coach, though she and her student doesn't seem very close.

=== International skaters ===
(Kazakhstan) Otabek Altin (オタベック・アルティン, Otabekku Arutin)
Voiced by: Yoshimasa Hosoya (Japanese); Mike McFarland (English)
An 18-year-old figure skater from Kazakhstan, Otabek is very popular in his country and seeks to make them proud with his skating. A private individual, Otabek is reticent and stoic, but is straightforward and earnest in his words and actions. A skilled skater, Otabek launched his senior debut by winning third place in the latest World Championships where Victor won his fifth gold medal. Five years prior to series, Otabek attended one of Yakov's training camps and came to respect Yuri P., feeling kinship with the younger boy and befriends him years later.
(China) Guang-Hong Ji (ジ・グァンホン, Ji Gwanhon; 季光虹)
Voiced by: Yūtarō Honjō (Japanese); Howard Wang (English)
A 17-year-old figure skater from People's Republic of China, Guang-Hong dreams of being a Hollywood celebrity and trains in Canada during the summer, with Leo and Phichit. He has a sweet and shy personality that makes him soft-spoken and easily flustered. Guang-Hong is good friends with Phichit Chulanont, who he admires and who is credited with getting him into SNS, and Leo de la Iglesia. Most of the time after he skates, his fans throw teddy bears on the rink. He is seen to own a lot of teddy bear plushes.
(Switzerland) Christophe "Chris" Giacometti (クリストフ・ジャコメッティ, Kurisutofu Jakometti)
Voiced by: Hiroki Yasumoto (Japanese); Christopher Sabat (English)
A 25-year-old figure skater from Switzerland. Christophe has a healthy rivalry with Viktor, admiring him since he was young, and won second place in the latest World Championships where Victor won his fifth gold medal. Typically easy-going, Chris is a slow starter during competitions and usually does better later in the free program, and is known for his sex appeal. With Victor taking a season off to coach Yuri K., Chris initially believes he won't have any real competition, but changes his mind when he sees how Yuri K. has improved and is determines to beat him in order to get Victor to compete again.
(Canada) Jean-Jacques "JJ" Leroy (ジャン・ジャック・ルロワ, Jan Jakku Rurowa)
Voiced by: Mamoru Miyano (Japanese); Jeremy Inman (English)
A 19-year-old Quebecois Canadian figure skater, Jean-Jacques, or "JJ", comes from a family of figure skaters. His parents were Olympic ice dance champions, who are also his coaches, and his younger brother and sister both participate in the junior league. A very skilled skater, JJ has a narcissistic attitude, tends to say whatever is on his mind, and enjoys teasing others. Although his attitude makes him hard to get along with, JJ is a decent person and works hard to the best skater in the world. Aside from skating, JJ plays in a band and enjoys doing volunteer work during the off-season.
(Thailand) Phichit Chulanont (ピチット・チュラノン, Pichitto Churanon; พิชิต จุลานนท์)
Voiced by: Kensho Ono (Japanese); Joel McDonald (English)
A 20-year-old figure skater from Thailand, Phichit was Yuri K.'s rink mate and college roommate during their time in Detroit, thus becoming good friends and even taught each other some words in their native languages. After Yuri K. left Detroit, Phichit returns to Thailand and is currently trains at the Imperial World ice rink in his hometown, Bangkok. Phichit is kind, cheerful, and loves to go on SNS and takes selfies, a passion he shares with his friends, Guang-Hong and Leo. According to Celestino, Phichit possess natural flair in his skating and has strong wish to represent his country with his figure skating career. He is shown to have owned multiple hamsters in Detroit during a flashback. Phichit also owns a hamster phone case, and multiple hamster plushes he had gotten from the audience.

(Italy) Michele Crispino (ミケーレ・クリスピーノ, Mikēre Kurisupīno)
Voiced by: Tomoaki Maeno (Japanese); J. Michael Tatum (English)
A 22-year-old figure skater from Italy, Michele, nicknamed "Mickey", is a serious and uptight person with a short-temper, often snapping at his fellow skater, Emil Nekola. He is very close to his twin sister, Sara, but is also overly dependent of her presence when he skates and becomes overprotective when other men approach her. Despite possessing a confrontational attitude and demeanor, he is actually a coward by nature; always keeping a distance from the men he lashes out at and freaking out when they get close to him, secretly trying to avoid confrontation whenever possible. Eventually, Sara makes Michele realize that his dependence on her isn't healthy and that he no longer needs her around to skate well.
(Japan) Kenjirō Minami (南 健次郎, Minami Kenjiro)
Voiced by: Ayumu Murase (Japanese); Trina Nishimura (English)
A 17-year-old figure skater from Japan, Minami is a bright and innocent skater who is just making his senior debut. He is a huge fan of Yuri K., whom he greatly idolizes. He lives in Fukuoka, and his parents are doctors and he has an older brother currently studying at a medical college. During the season Yuri K. lost his first Grand Prix Final, Minami had beaten Yuri K. once at Nationals and is considered the number one star among young skaters. Despite this, Minami is humble and is encouraging to his fellow skaters, and still greatly admires Yuri K. as his role model and rival. Minami currently trains at the Hakata Skate Club with his coach, Kanako.
(South Korea) Seung Gil Lee (イ・スンギル, I Sungiru; 이승길)
Voiced by: Kenji Nojima (Japanese); Oscar Seung (English)
A 20-year-old figure skater from South Korea, Seung Gil is a stoic and calculating young man. He is generally emotionless, even during his programs, and only thinks about ice skating and improving his skills. Due to his handsome looks, he's very popular, especially with women, but pays no attention to his fans and often treats other people in a cold, detached manner.
(Czech Republic) Emil Nekola (エミル・ネコラ, Emiru Nekora)
Voiced by: Satoshi Hino (Japanese); Justin Briner (English)
An 18-year-old figure skater from the Czech Republic, Emil has a pure heart and mannerly disposition, which makes it easy for Michele to boss him around. He has a dynamic skating style and likes playing extreme sports during the off-season, which makes his coach anxious.
(Russia) Georgi Popovich (ギオルギー・ポポーヴィッチ, Giorugī Popōvitchi)
Voiced by: Wataru Hatano (Japanese); David Trosko (English)
A 27-year-old figure skater from Russia, Georgi is Yuri P.'s, Mila's, and formerly Victor's rink mate and trains with them under their coach, Yakov. He is a diligent and effective student with great confidence in his artistic sensitivity. With Victor taking a season off to coach Yuri K., Georgi is now considered the best Russian male skater. He used to have an ice dancer girlfriend named Anya, but was recently dumped by her and used his heartbreak to fuel his Grand Prix programs.
Some confusion exists around Georgi's age. When the character is first introduced in episode 6, the Japanese text states his age as 25. The English translation, however, is given as 27. Later, in the Japanese version of the same episode, the announcer states that he is 27 years old, but the English dubbed version translates it as 25. The official Japanese Yuri on Ice website lists his age as 27 as do the English subtitled translations.
(United States) Leo de la Iglesia (レオ・デ・ラ・イグレシア, Reo de ra Igureshia)
Voiced by: Shun'ichi Toki (Japanese); Ricco Fajardo (English)
A 19-year-old figure skater from the United States, Leo is a Mexican-American who creates his own choreography, causing his programs to be full of originality that entertains the audience. He is an energetic and considerate individual with a great love for music. Like his friends Phichit and Guang-Hong, he enjoys frequenting and updating SNS.
(Russia) Mila Babicheva (ミラ・バビチェヴァ, Mira Babicheva)
Voiced by: Mari Doi (Japanese); Monica Rial (English)
An 18-year-old figure skater from Russia, Mila is Yuri P.'s and Georgi's rink mate and trains with them under their coach, Yakov. She's friendly and likes to tease Yuri P., much to his annoyance. She is ranked third as one of the world's top female ice skaters.
(Italy) Sara Crispino (サーラ・クリスピーノ, Sāra Kurisupīno)
Voiced by: Marika Minase (Japanese); Tia Ballard (English)
A 22-year-old figure skater from Italy, Sara is Michele's twin sister and the fourth best female skater in the world. Unlike her short-tempered brother, Sara is friendly and more mature, recognizing Michele's attachment to her is unhealthy and will affect both of their careers unless they're able to skate without the other being around. Eventually, Sara makes Michele realize that his dependence on her isn't healthy and that they no longer need each other around when they skate.

== Cameo appearances ==
(Japan) Nobunari Oda (織田 信成, Oda Nobunari)
Voiced by: himself (Japanese); Vic Mignogna (English)
A 29-year-old retired Japanese champion figure skater, Oda joins Morooka as a guest commentator for the Grand Prix Final short program.
(Switzerland) Stéphane Lambiel (ステファン・ランビエール, Sutefan Ranbiēru)
Voiced by: himself (Japanese); Jessie James Grelle (English)
A 31-year-old retired Swiss champion figure skater, Lambiel is a guest commentator for the French coverage of the Grand Prix Final free skate. In the Japanese version, he speaks in his native language of French rather than Japanese.
