= Kiyomi Niwata =

Japanese triathlete

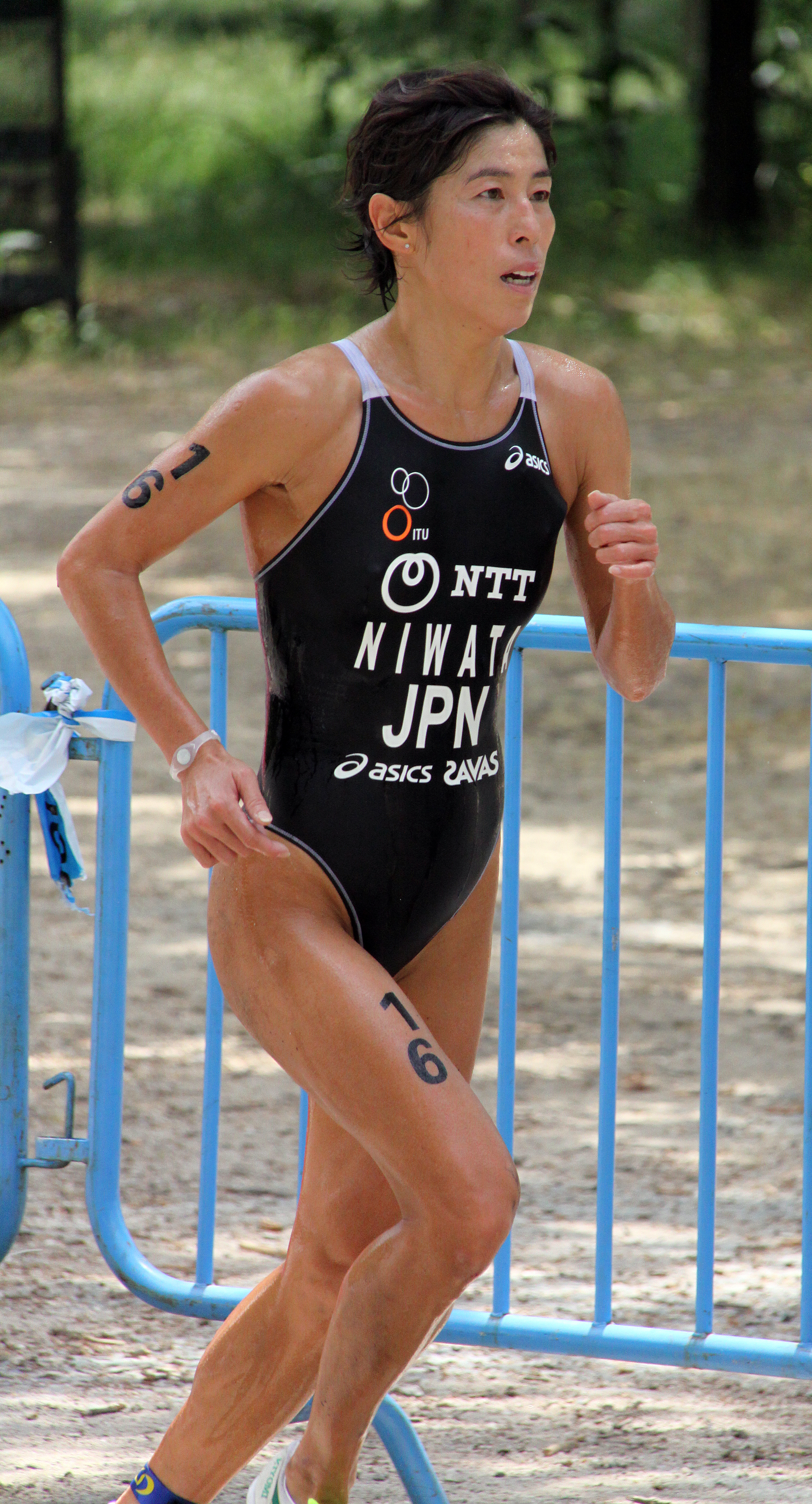
Kiyomi Niwata in the heat of the World Championship Series triathlon in Madrid, 2010.

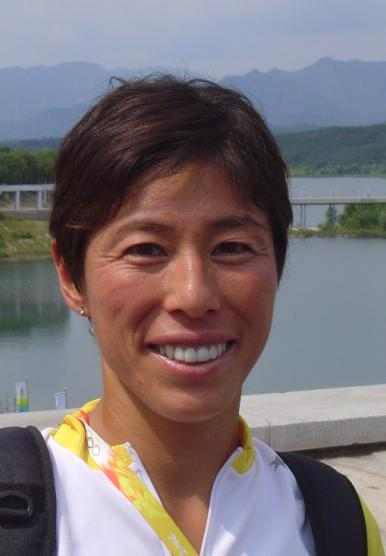
Kiyomi Niwata at the Olympic Games in Beijing, 2008.

Kiyomi Niwata (Japanese: 庭田清美, born 10 December 1970 in Ushiku, Ibaraki Prefecture) is a professional triathlete from Japan, triple Olympian (Sydney, Athens, Beijing), multiple-time National Champion (2004, 2005, 2006), and an Asian Aquathlon Champion and Oceanian Triathlon Champion of the year 2009.

Kiyomi Niwata and Anja Dittmer are the only triathletes who took part in all three Olympic triathlons. In Sydney and in Athens, Niwata placed 14th, in Beijing, 9th. She is coached by Col Stewart.

== ITU Competitions ==
In the 14 years from 1997 to 2010, Kiyomi Niwata took part in 99 ITU competitions and achieved 39 top ten positions. In 2010, as a veteran at the age of 39 years, she still belongs to the world elite, takes part in the Dextro Energy World Championship Series together with Ai Ueda, and she won, for instance, the gold medal at the World Cup in Ishigaki. The following list is based upon the official ITU Profile Page. Unless indicated otherwise, all competitions are triathlons (Olympic Distance) and belong to the Elite category.

Date	Competition	Place	Rank
1997-04-13	World Cup	Ishigaki	6
1997-04-27	World Cup	Auckland	15
1997-06-29	World Cup	Monte Carlo	22
1997-07-06	World Cup	Gamagori	2
1997-09-21	World Cup	Hamilton	12
1997-10-12	World Cup	Cancun	27
1997-10-26	World Cup	Sydney	26
1997-11-16	World Championships	Perth	28
1998-04-12	World Cup	Ishigaki	10
1998-04-26	World Cup	Sydney	17
1998-06-21	World Cup	Zürich	24
1998-07-12	World Cup	Gamagori	5
1998-08-02	World Cup	Corner Brook	19
1998-08-09	World Cup	Tiszaújváros	9
1998-08-30	World Championships	Lausanne	35
1998-09-27	World Cup	Cancun	10
1998-11-01	World Cup	Auckland	9
1998-11-08	World Cup	Noosa	18
1999-04-11	World Cup	Ishigaki	16
1999-04-18	World Cup	Gamagori	18
1999-05-02	World Cup	Sydney	31
1999-06-13	World Cup	Kapelle-op-den-Bos	18
1999-06-26	World Cup	Big Island	15
1999-07-11	ASTC Asian Regional Championships	Sokcho	4
1999-09-12	World Championships	Montreal	31
1999-10-10	World Cup	Cancun	25
1999-11-07	World Cup	Noosa	23
2000-04-01	World Cup	Big Island	14
2000-04-09	World Cup	Ishigaki	8
2000-09-16	Olympic Games	Sydney	14
2001-04-15	World Cup	Gamagori	19
2001-04-22	World Cup	Ishigaki	14
2002-03-31	World Cup	Geelong	9
2002-05-19	World Cup	Ishigaki	16
2002-06-09	World Cup	Gamagori	15
2002-10-06	World Cup	Makuhari	17
2002-11-09	World Championships	Cancun	33
2003-04-13	World Cup	Ishigaki	16
2003-06-15	World Cup	Gamagori	11
2003-07-13	World Cup	Edmonton	22
2003-10-13	World Cup	Makuhari	10
2003-11-23	World Cup	Geelong	11
2003-12-06	World Championships	Queenstown	43
2004-04-11	World Cup	Ishigaki	3
2004-05-09	World Championships	Madeira	17
2004-08-25	Olympic Games	Athens	14
2005-05-01	World Cup	Mooloolaba	5
2005-05-15	World Cup	Ishigaki	2
2005-07-02	ASTC Asian Championships	Singapore	11
2005-07-17	World Cup	Corner Brook	3
2005-07-23	World Cup	Edmonton	9
2005-09-08	Aquathlon World Championships	Gamagori	4
2005-09-10	World Championships	Gamagori	13
2005-10-23	Asian Cup	Tokyo	1
2005-11-13	World Cup	New Plymouth	13
2006-03-26	World Cup	Mooloolaba	6
2006-04-16	World Cup	Ishigaki	7
2006-07-09	BG World Cup	Edmonton	8
2006-07-23	BG World Cup	Corner Brook	15
2006-09-02	World Championships	Lausanne	DNF
2006-09-24	BG World Cup	Beijing	23
2006-11-12	BG World Cup	New Plymouth	22
2007-03-04	OTU Oceania Championships	Geelong	9
2007-03-25	BG World Cup	Mooloolaba	7
2007-04-15	BG World Cup	Ishigaki	14
2007-06-01	ASTC Asian Championships	Tongyeong	4
2007-06-10	BG World Cup	Vancouver	7
2007-06-17	BG World Cup	Des Moines	7
2007-06-24	BG World Cup	Edmonton	9
2007-07-22	BG World Cup	Kitzbühel	4
2007-07-29	BG World Cup	Salford	5
2007-08-30	BG World Championships	Hamburg	21
2007-09-15	BG World Cup	Beijing	48
2007-09-23	Asian Cup	Hong Kong	DNF
2008-03-30	BG World Cup	Mooloolaba	36
2008-04-13	BG World Cup	Ishigaki	30
2008-05-02	ASTC Asian Championships	Guanzhou	2
2008-06-05	BG World Championships	Vancouver	35
2008-08-18	Olympic Games	Beijing	9
2008-11-15	Asian Cup	Hong Kong	1
2008-11-16	ASTC Aquathlon Asian Championships	Golden Beach	1
2009-03-01	OTU Oceania Championships	Gold Coast	1
2009-03-29	World Cup	Mooloolaba	20
2009-04-05	Oceania Cup	New Plymouth	3
2009-04-26	World Cup	Ishigaki	3
2009-05-02	Dextro Energy World Championship Series	Tongyeong	6
2009-05-31	Dextro Energy World Championship Series	Madrid	25
2009-06-21	Dextro Energy World Championship Series	Washington D.C.	20
2009-06-27	Elite Cup	Hy-Vee	16
2009-08-15	Dextro Energy World Championship Series	London	29
2009-08-22	Dextro Energy World Championship Series	Yokohama	6
2009-09-09	Dextro Energy World Championship Series, Grand Final	Gold Coast	32
2010-03-27	World Cup	Mooloolaba	7
2010-04-11	Dextro Energy World Championship Series	Sydney	DNF
2010-04-25	World Cup	Ishigaki	1
2010-05-08	Dextro Energy World Championship Series	Seoul	20
2010-06-05	Dextro Energy World Championship Series	Madrid	44
2010-07-17	Dextro Energy World Championship Series	Hamburg	DNF
2010-07-24	Dextro Energy World Championship Series	London	DNS
2010-09-08	Dextro Energy World Championship Series: Grand Final	Budapest	40

BG = the sponsor British Gas · DNF = did not finish · DNS = did not start
