= "Chūsotsu" "Chūkara" =

Set of two greatest hits albums by Shiritsu Ebisu Chugaku

"Chūsotsu": Ebichū no Ike Ike Best and "Chūkara": Ebichū no Waku Waku Best are two best-of albums by the Japanese girl idol group Shiritsu Ebisu Chugaku. They were released in Japan simultaneously on November 16, 2016. This marks the final release featuring Rina Matsuno, who died on February 8, 2017.

== "Chūsotsu": Ebichū no Ike Ike Best ==
"Chūsotsu": Ebichū no Ike Ike Best

Greatest hits album by Shiritsu Ebisu Chugaku
- Released: November 16, 2016 (Japan)
- Genres: J-pop, pop
- Label: SME Records

Shiritsu Ebisu Chugaku chronology
Anarchy (2016)	"Chūsotsu": Ebichū no Ike Ike Best (2016)

Singles from "Chūsotsu": Ebichū no Ike Ike Best
- 1. "Massugu" Released: September 21, 2016

Professional ratings
Review scores
Source	Rating
CDJournal	Favorable

"Chūsotsu": Ebichū no Ike Ike Best (「中卒」〜エビ中のイケイケベスト〜) contains all the band's major-label hits to date (all the A-sides of the first ten major-label singles), one B-side and one album track. Some songs were re-recorded with the current line-up.

The album contains songs of different genres, such as heavy metal, melocore and electro. The Japan-based music website CDJournal in its review of the album states that the album does well in both showing the band's individually and reflecting its musical career. The site also notes the musicality of the songs and how the lyrics make use of each member's individuality.

=== Track listing ===
No.	Title	Length
1.	"Karikeiyaku no Cinderella (Chūsotsu ver.)"
2.	"Hōkago Getabako Rock'n'Roll MX (Chūsotsu ver.)"
3.	"Go! Go! Here We Go! Rock Lee (Chūsotsu ver.)"
4.	"Otona wa Wakatte Kurenai (Chūsotsu ver.)"
5.	"Ume (Chūsotsu ver.)"
6.	"Te o Tsunagō (Chūsotsu ver.)"
7.	"Kindan no Karma (Chūsotsu ver.)"
8.	"Mikakunin Chūgakusei X (Kinpachi ver.)"
9.	"Butterfly Effect"
10.	"Haitateki!"
11.	"Kinpachi Dance Music"
12.	"Natsudaze Johnny"
13.	"Super Hero"
14.	"Massugu"

== "Chūkara": Ebichū no Waku Waku Best ==
"Chūkara": Ebichū no Waku Waku Best

Greatest hits album by Shiritsu Ebisu Chugaku
- Released: November 16, 2016 (Japan)
- Genres: J-pop, pop
- Label: SME Records

Shiritsu Ebisu Chugaku chronology
Anarchy (2016)	"Chūkara": Ebichū no Waku Waku Best (2016)

Music video
- "Sudden Death" on YouTube

"Chūkara": Ebichū no Waku Waku Best (「中辛」〜エビ中のワクワクベスト〜) contains selected major-label B-sides and album tracks. Some songs were re-recorded with the current line-up. There is also one new song, titled "Sudden Death".

=== Track listing ===
No.	Title	Length
1.	"Chichinpui"
2.	"U.B.U. (Kinpachi ver.)"
3.	"Stardust Light (Chūkara ver.)"
4.	"Namida wa Niawanai"
5.	"Sudden Death" (Japanese: サドンデス) (• new song)
6.	"Lovely Smiley Baby"
7.	"I'm Your Manager!!! (Chūkara ver.)"
8.	"Encore no Koi"
9.	"Ganbatteru Tochū (Chūkara ver.)"
10.	"Yūwaku Shitai ya (Chūkara ver.)"
11.	"Fuyukoi"
12.	"Fure! Fure! Cyalume (Chūkara ver.)"
13.	"Hotaru no Hikari (Demo)"
14.	"Zenryoku Runner"

== "Chūsotsu" "Chūkara": Ebichū no Complete Best ==
"Chūsotsu" "Chūkara": Ebichū no Complete Best (「中卒」「中辛」～エビ中のコンプリートベスト～) is a limited-edition box set. It includes both albums plus a third CD with a special DJ mix.

=== Contents ===
1. CD1："Chūsotsu": Ebichū no Ike Ike Best
2. CD2："Chūkara": Ebichū no Waku Waku Best
3. CD3：Ebichu's Championship Tera-Mix (Mixed by CMJK)
  (• mix of 81 songs, lasting 58:44)

== Charts ==
=== "Chūsotsu": Ebichū no Ike Ike Best ===
Chart (2016)	Peak position		
Chart (2016)	Peak position	Japan (Oricon Daily)	5
Japan (Oricon Weekly)	11		

=== "Chūkara": Ebichū no Waku Waku Best ===
Chart (2016)	Peak position		
Chart (2016)	Peak position	Japan (Oricon Daily)	6
Japan (Oricon Weekly)	12		
