= Ebicracy =

Studio album by Shiritsu Ebisu Chugaku
- Released: May 31, 2017 (Japan)
- Genres: J-pop, pop, rock
- Label: SME Records

Shiritsu Ebisu Chugaku chronology
"Chūsotsu": Ebichū no Ike Ike Best (2016) "Chūkara": Ebichū no Waku Waku Best (2016)	Ebicracy (2017)	"MUSiC" (2019)

Ebicracy (エビクラシー, Ebikurashī) is the fourth studio album by the Japanese female idol group Shiritsu Ebisu Chugaku. The album was released on May 31, 2017, through SME Records.

The album is the groups' first release since the death of Rina Matsuno on February 8 due to a cardiac arrhythmia. It is also the last album to feature Aika Hirota, who would leave the group in January 2018.

Ebicracy is the only studio album by Ebichu that consists purely of newly written material, as the album contains no singles.

== Background ==
Although announced and released after Rina Matsuno's death, the album itself was already in the works prior to her death. The track "Kanjou Densha" in particular, was demoed earlier than the other songs, due to it being used in a TV commercial. Since Ebichu's recording sessions involve all members singing every song as a solo track, and then piecing parts together, this resulted in "Kanjou Densha" having a "Rina Matsuno solo version". This recording was played during the end credits for the final show of the supporting tour, which was held on July 16 - Rina's birthday. Other songs were modified following Rina's death, with "Nanairo" being completely re-ordered to fit the album.

The photo used for the album artwork, which features the seven members dressed in Taisho-era school uniforms, is actually a re-shoot, with the original being photographed while Rina was still alive. A documentary, titled "Everything Point 5", focusing on the supporting tour and containing the final concert in full, was released on December 6, 2017.

== Release ==
The album was released in two versions: a regular edition and a two-CD limited edition. The limited edition's second disc contains seven of the albums tracks, each sung as a solo track by one of the members. In addition, seven fan club exclusive versions were released. These are identical in content to the regular editions, the difference being that each version features a particular member on the cover art.

== Track listing ==
=== CD ===
No.	Title	Lyrics	Music	Arranger(s)	Length
1.	"Yebisu Totetama Wanthem" (ゑびすとてたまわんせむ)	Oichan	Oichan	Oichan	1:02
2.	"Seifuku "Hourensou" Funk" (制服"報連相"ファンク)	corin.	corin.	corin., Motoi Murakami	3:16
3.	"Kanjou Densha" (感情電車)	Ayumi Tamura	Ayumi Tamura	Ayumi Tamura	5:02
4.	"Kurenai no Uta" (紅の詩)	TAKUYA	TAKUYA	TAKUYA, Keisuke Iizuka	4:26
5.	"Comic Girl" (コミックガール)	Yasuo Kitajima	Su-xing-cyu	Su-xing-cyu	4:27
6.	"Sayonara Bye-Bye Mata Ashita" (さよならばいばいまたあした)	Kengo Kakudate	Kengo Kakudate	Kengo Kakudate	5:18
7.	"Nanairo" (なないろ)	Takafumi Ikeda	Takafumi Ikeda	Takafumi Ikeda, Hiroo Yamaguchi	4:10
8.	"Kimi no Mama de" (君のままで)	Hiroyuki Fujino	Hiroyuki Fujino	Hiroyuki Fujino	4:01
9.	"Aiiro no Monday" (藍色のMonday)	CMJK	CMJK	CMJK	4:54
10.	"Haru no Arashi" (春の嵐)	Yoshimasa Terui	Yoshimasa Terui	Yoshimasa Terui	4:30
11.	"Forever Chubo" (フォーエバー中坊)	Kenichi Maeyamada	Kenichi Maeyamada	Masaya Suzuki	4:38
Total length:					46:05

=== CD2 (Limited Edition only) ===
No.	Title	Sung By	Length
1.	"Seifuku "Hourensou" Funk" (制服"報連相"ファンク)	Riko Nakayama	3:17
2.	"Kanjou Densha" (感情電車)	Kaho Kobayashi	5:02
3.	"Kurenai no Uta" (紅の詩)	Hinata Kashiwagi	4:26
4.	"Comic Girl" (コミックガール)	Aika Hirota	4:37
5.	"Kimi no Mama de" (君のままで)	Ayaka Yasumoto	4:01
6.	"Aiiro no Monday" (藍色のMonday)	Mirei Hoshina	4:54
7.	"Haru no Arashi" (春の嵐)	Rika Mayama	4:32
Total length:			31:04

== Personnel ==
- Shiritsu Ebisu Chugaku - vocals
  - 3 Rika Mayama
  - 5 Ayaka Yasumoto
  - 6 Aika Hirota
  - 7 Mirei Hoshina
  - 10 Hinata Kashiwagi
  - 11 Kaho Kobayashi
  - 12 Riko Nakayama
- Oichan - Guitar, Bass guitar and Programming on Track 1
- Masa Kohama - Guitar on Track 2
- Naoki Ikumoto - Guitar on Track 3
- TAKUYA - Guitar and backing vocals on Track 4
- Masayan - Guitar on Track 5
- Fumiya Takemura - Guitar on Track 6
- Masahiro Machida - Guitar on Track 7
- Hiroyuki Fujino - Guitar, Bass Guitar and Programming on Track 8
- Yoshimasa Terui - Guitar and Programming on Track 10
- Electrosonar - Guitar on Track 11
- Kenji "JIN" Hino - Bass Guitar on Track 2
- Takashi Adachi - Bass Guitar on Track 3
- Chiaki Ito - Bass Guitar on Track 4
- Uta - Bass Guitar on Track 5
- Kousei Ueno - Bass Guitar on Track 6
- Hiroo Yamaguchi - Bass Guitar, Keyboards and programming on Track 7
- CMJK - Bass Guitar and programming on Track 9
- Atsumasa Terui - Bass Guitar on Track 10
- Fuyu - Drums on Track 2
- Ryohei Nomura - Drums on Track 3
- Shuntaro Kado - Drums on Track 4
- Morris - Drums on Track 5
- Tetsushi Kasuya - Drums on Track 6
- Tomu Tamada - Drums on Track 7
- Rintarou - Drums on Track 10
- Hiroaki Yokoyama - Piano on Track 3
- Kousuke Murahara - Piano on Track 4
- Keisuke Iizuka - Synthesizer and Programming on Track 4
- Takafumi Ikeda - Keyboards and Programming on Track 7
- Kazuki Moriya - Keyboards on Track 10
- corin. - Programming on Track 2
- Ayumi Tamura - Programming on Track 3
- Kengo Kakudate - Programming on Track 6
- Masaya Suzuki - Programming on Track 11
- Yoshihiro Goseki - Saxophone on Track 2
- Hiroyuki Yokota - Alto Saxophone on Track 3
- Satoru Takeshima - Saxophone on Track 7
- Motoi Murakami - Trumpet on Track 2
- Mitsuru Tanaka - Trumpet on Track 3
- Teppei Kawakami - Trumpet on Track 7
- Gentle Kubota - Trombone on Track 2
- Azusa Toujou - Trombone on Track 3
- Naofumi Takimoto - Trombone on Track 7
- Yuuki Nakajima - Violin on Track 3
- Emiko Nishiyama - Backing Vocals on Track 2
- Shinji Asakura - Wind chime on Track 7

== Charts ==
Chart (2017)	Peak position
Oricon Weekly Albums Chart	1
JP Billboard Top Albums	1
JP Billboard Hot Albums	1

== Notes ==
- All personnel and writing credits taken from the album insert.
