= Anarchy (Shiritsu Ebisu Chugaku album) =

Studio album by Shiritsu Ebisu Chugaku
- Released: April 20, 2016 (Japan)
- Genre: J-pop, pop, rock
- Label: SME Records

Shiritsu Ebisu Chugaku chronology
Kinpachi (2015)	Anarchy (2016)	"Chūsotsu": Ebichū no Ike Ike Best (2016) "Chūkara": Ebichū no Waku Waku Best (2016)

Singles from Anarchy
- 1. "Natsudaze Johnny" Released: June 17, 2015; 2. "Super Hero" Released: October 21, 2015

Alternative cover
- Artwork for the Special Edition Type A

Alternative cover
- Artwork for the Special Edition Type B

Professional ratings
Review scores
Source	Rating
CDJournal	Favorable

Anarchy (穴空, Anākī) is the third studio album by the Japanese female idol group Shiritsu Ebisu Chugaku. The album was released on April 20, 2016, on the Sony Music Entertainment Japan's label SME Records.

The album was originally scheduled for release on February 10. However, in December 2015 group member Hinata Kashiwagi was diagnosed with sudden deafness, which lead to the album's release being postponed.

== Background ==
The album was released in 3 versions: a regular edition (CD-only) and two limited editions: the Limited Edition A (CD+Blu-ray) and the Limited Edition B (2CD). The limited editions and the first press of the regular version included a trading card (randomly selected from a set of 9 that includes a card for each member) as a bonus.

== Track listing ==
=== CD ===
No.	Title	Lyrics	Music	Arranger(s)	Length
1.	"Umete Agetai (Interlude)" (埋めてあげたい（Interlude）)	Ryoichi Tsuchiya (Script)	-	-	4:26
2.	"Zettē Anarchy" (ゼッテーアナーキー)	Abedon	Abedon	Abedon	3:34
3.	"Haruyasumi Moratorium Chūgakusei" (春休みモラトリアム中学生)	Kaiki Ogata	Kaiki Ogata	Kaiki Ogata, Keita Nishii	5:08
4.	"Popcorn Tone" (ポップコーントーン)	Ayumi Tamura	Ayumi Tamura	Ayumi Tamura	4:31
5.	"Nikibi" (面皰)	Kayoko Yoshizawa	Kayoko Yoshizawa	Hikaru Ishizaki	3:17
6.	"Ebichū Shusseki Bangō no Uta Sono 2" (エビ中出席番号の歌 その2)	Kenichi Maeyamada	Kenichi Maeyamada	Kenichi Maeyamada	4:30
7.	"Mabui Ragga Typhoon (Interlude)" (マブいラガタイフーン（Interlude）)	MTG, PKNY	MTG	MTG	2:02
8.	"Natsudaze Johnny" (夏だぜジョニー)	Ryo from Orange Range, Satori Shiraishi	Ryo, Satori Shiraishi	Ryo, Satori Shiraishi	5:02
9.	"Mission Survivor" (MISSION SURVIVOR)	Yoshikatsu Shuto	Yoshikatsu Shuto	Masaya Suzuki	3:55
10.	"Nachumelo Rendez-vous" (ナチュメロらんでぶー)	Ayumi Tamura	Ayumi Tamura	Ayumi Tamura	4:44
11.	"Ana Aki in the Yūkei (Interlude)" (あな秋いんざ夕景（Interlude）)	Hirohisa Maruyama (Script)	-	-	2:43
12.	"Ponpara Pecorna Papiyotta" (ポンパラペコルナパピヨッタ) (performed by 5572320 (五五七二三二〇))	Naoki Tanaka	Yoko Kanno	Yoko Kanno	4:31
13.	"Onegai Jesus" (お願いジーザス)	Shinichi Kato	Shinichi Kato	Fujifabric	4:51
14.	"Zenryoku☆Runner" (全力☆ランナー)	Katsuhiko Sugiyama	Katsuhiko Sugiyama	Katsuhiko Sugiyama	4:35
15.	"Super Hero" (スーパーヒーロー)	YuReeNa	kzm	CHOKKAKU	4:29
16.	"Sanmaime no Tough Gaki" (参枚目のタフガキ)	Kenichi Maeyamada	Kenichi Maeyamada	CMJK	4:56

=== Blu-ray Disc (Limited Edition A only) ===
No.	Title	Length
1.	"opening~ebiture"
2.	"Ebizori Diamond!!" (えびぞりダイアモンド!!)
3.	"Chime!" (チャイム!)
4.	"The Tissue ~Tomaranai Seishun~" (ザ・ティッシュ〜とまらない青春〜)
5.	"Oh My Ghost? ~Watashi ga Akuryou ni Nattemo~" (オーマイゴースト?〜わたしが悪霊になっても〜)
6.	"Uretai Emotion!" (売れたいエモーション!)
7.	"Kari-Keiyaku no Cinderella" (仮契約のシンデレラ)
8.	"Houkago Getabako Rock 'n Roll MX" (放課後ゲタ箱ロッケンロールMX)
9.	"Go! Go! Here We Go! Rock Lee" (Go! Go! Here We Go! ロック・リー)
10.	"Otona wa Wakattekurenai" (大人はわかってくれない)
11.	"Ume" (梅)
12.	"Ganbatteru Tochu" (頑張ってる途中))
13.	"Kindan no Karma" (禁断のカルマ)
14.	"Te wo Tsunagou" (手をつなごう)
15.	"Yuwaku Shitaiya" (誘惑したいや)
16.	"Mikakunin Chugakusei X" (未確認中学生X)
17.	"Butterfly Effect" (バタフライエフェクト)
18.	"Haitateki!" (ハイタテキ!)
19.	"Kinpachi Dance Music" (金八DANCE MUSIC)
20.	"Natsudaze Johnny" (夏だぜジョニー)
21.	"Nachumelo Rendez-vous" (ナチュメロらんでぶー)

- Live Performance Filmed at Kishidan Banpaku on September 20, 2015.

=== CD2 (Limited Edition B only) ===
No.	Title	Length
1.	"Atashi Kitto Mugen Looper" (あたしきっと無限ルーパー)
2.	"Kinpachi Dance Music" (金八DANCE MUSIC)
3.	"Tsukatte Portfolio" (使ってポートフォリオ)
4.	"King of Gakugeikai no Theme ~Nu Skool Teenage Riot~" (キングオブ学芸会のテーマ 〜Nu Skool Teenage Riot〜)
5.	"Tebura de Ski ~Seishun Liberty~" (テブラデスキー 〜青春リバティ〜)
6.	"Encore no Koi" (アンコールの恋)
7.	"Fuyukoi" (フユコイ)
8.	"Playback" (PLAYBACK)
9.	"Haitateki!" (ハイタテキ!)
10.	"Chichinpui" (ちちんぷい)

- Recorded live at Saitama Super Arena on December 12, 2015.

== Personnel ==
- Shiritsu Ebisu Chugaku - vocals
  - 3 Rika Mayama
  - 5 Ayaka Yasumoto
  - 6 Aika Hirota
  - 7 Mirei Hoshina
  - 9 Rina Matsuno
  - 10 Hinata Kashiwagi
  - 11 Kaho Kobayashi
  - 12 Riko Nakayama
- Abedon - Guitar, Piano and Keyboard on Track 2
- Takeshi Kiuchi - Guitar on Track 2
- Masayuki Takeda - Guitar on Track 3
- Hayato Mitsuhashi - Guitar on Track 3
- Naoki Ikumoto - Guitar on Tracks 4 and 10
- Mitsuru Ishizaki - Guitar, Chamberlin, Sitar and Percussion on Track 5
- Kouji Ueda - Guitar on Track 8
- Electro Sonar - Guitar on Track 9
- Tsuneo Imahori - Guitar on Track 12
- Soichiro Yamauchi - Guitar on Track 13
- Katsuhiko Sugiyama - Guitar, Bass guitar and Programming on Track 14
- CHOKKAKU - Guitar and Programming on Track 15
- Tomoharu "Jr." Takahashi - Bass guitar on Track 2
- Keita Nishii - Bass guitar and Programming on Track 3
- Takashi Adachi - Bass guitar on Tracks 4 and 10
- Hama Okamoto - Bass guitar on Track 5
- Ichiro Fujiya - Bass guitar on Track 8
- KenKen - Bass guitar on Track 12
- Shinichi Kato - Bass guitar on Track 12
- Takeshi Taneda - Bass guitar on Track 15
- Sayako Sawamura - Drums on Track 2
- Daisuke Miyano - Drums on Track 3
- Ryohei Nomura - Drums on Tracks 4 and 10
- Pierre Nakano - Drums on Track 5
- Daisuke Sato - Drums on Track 8
- Hideki Aoyama - Drums on Track 12
- Yuko Ayaki - Drums and Percussion on Track 13
- Hajimetal - Keyboards on Track 3
- Masaya Suzuki - Keyboards, Synthesizer and Programming on Track 9
- Ayumi Tamura - Programming on Tracks 4 and 10;Piano on Track 4
- Akiko Sheena - Marimba and Percussion on Track 5
- Mio Okamura - Violin on Track 5
- Yu Sugino - Violin on Track 5
- Akatsuki Takahashi - Violin on Track 5
- Kayoko Yoshizawa - Backing vocals on Track 5
- Mitsuru Ishizaki - Backing vocals on Track 5
- Kurosu Ishizaki - Backing vocals on Track 5
- Annie - Backing Vocals on Track 8
- Kenichi Maeyamada - Programming on Track 6
- MTG - Programming on Track 7
- Keiko Osaki - Piano on Track 8
- Ryosuke Oda - Trumpet on Track 8
- Kosuke Nakayama - Trumpet on Track 8
- Yoshiki Minezaki - Trumpet on Track 8
- Yutaka Onoda - Trombone on Track 8
- Kayoko Yuasa - Trombone on Track 8
- Junnosuke Fujita - Saxophone on Track 8
- Tomoko Yokoyama - Saxophone on Track 8
- Seika Girls' Highschool Band - additional wind instruments on Track 8
- Koichiro Muroya Strings - Strings on Track 12
- Keishi Urata - Synth Manipulator on Track 12
- Shunsuke Sakamoto - Synth Manipulator on Track 12
- Hitoshi Konno Strings - Strings on Track 15
- CMJK - Keyboards and Programming of Track 16

== Charts ==
Chart (2016)	Peak position
Oricon Weekly Albums Chart	2

== Notes ==
- All credits taken from the album insert.
