= Oh My Ghost? (Watashi ga Akuryō ni Natte mo) =

Single by Shiritsu Ebisu Chugaku

from the album Ebichū no Zeppan Best: Owaranai Seishun
- B-side: "Gozonji! Ebichū Ondo"
- Released: July 27, 2011 (Japan)
- Genre: Pop
- Label: Stardust Ongaku Shuppan
- Songwriter: Kenichi Maeyamada
- Producer: Kenichi Maeyamada

Shiritsu Ebisu Chugaku singles chronology
"The Tissue (Tomaranai Seishun)" (2011)	"Oh My Ghost? (Watashi ga Akuryō ni Natte mo)" (2011)	"Motto Hashire!!" (2011)

Music video
- "Oh My Ghost? (Watashi ga Akuryō ni Natte mo)" on YouTube

"Oh My Ghost? (Watashi ga Akuryō ni Natte mo)" (オーマイゴースト? ～わたしが悪霊になっても～; "Oh My Ghost? (Even If I Turn into an Evil Spirit)") is the fourth single by the Japanese girl idol group Shiritsu Ebisu Chugaku (or fifth counting one cover single), released in Japan on July 27, 2011 on the indie label Stardust Ongaku Shuppan.

== History ==
The single debuted at the 12th position in the Oricon Daily Singles Chart. In the Oricon Weekly Singles Chart, it peaked at number 59.

== Members ==
Mizuki, Reina Miyazaki, Rika Mayama, Natsu Anno, Ayaka Yasumoto, Aika Hirota, Mirei Hoshina, Hirono Suzuki, Rina Matsuno, Hinata Kashiwagi

== Track listing ==
No.	Title	Credits	Length
1.	"Oh My Ghost? (Watashi ga Akuryō ni Natte mo)" (オーマイゴースト? ～わたしが悪霊になっても～), "Oh My Ghost? (I, Too, Turned into an Evil Spirit)")	Lyrics, music, arrangement, ghost: Kenichi Maeyamada; Chorus: Aika Hirota, Hinata Kashiwagi
2.	"Gozonji! Ebichū Ondo" (ご存知!エビ中音頭, "You Know! Ebichu Marching Song")	Lyrics, music, arrangement, person from the neighborhood association: Kenichi Maeyamada
3.	"Oh My Ghost? (Watashi ga Akuryō ni Natte mo) (Off Vocal)" (オーマイゴースト?〜わたしが悪霊になっても〜（Off Vocal）)
4.	"Gozonji! Ebichū Ondo (Off Vocal)" (ご存知!エビ中音頭（Off Vocal）)

== Charts ==
Chart (2011)	Peak position
Oricon Daily Singles Chart	12
Oricon Weekly Singles Chart	59
Billboard Japan Hot Singles Sales	47
Billboard Japan Top Independent Albums and Singles	10
