= The Tissue (Tomaranai Seishun) =

Single by Shiritsu Ebisu Chugaku

from the album Ebichū no Zeppan Best: Owaranai Seishun
- B-side: "Ebichū Isshūkan"
- Released: April 27, 2011 (Japan)
- Genre: Pop
- Label: Stardust Ongaku Shuppan
- Songwriter: Kenichi Maeyamada

Shiritsu Ebisu Chugaku singles chronology
| "Chime!" (2011) | "The Tissue (Tomaranai Seishun)" (2011) | "Oh My Ghost? (Watashi ga Akuryō ni Natte mo)" (2011) |

Music video
- "The Tissue (Tomaranai Seishun)" on YouTube

"The Tissue (Tomaranai Seishun)" (ザ・ティッシュ～とまらない青春～; "The Tissue (Unstoppable Youth)") is the third single by the Japanese girl idol group Shiritsu Ebisu Chugaku (or fourth counting one cover single), released in Japan on April 27, 2011 on the indie label Stardust Ongaku Shuppan.

== History ==
The single achieved the 17th position in the Oricon Daily Singles Chart. In the weekly Oricon ranking, it peaked at number 73.

== Members ==
Mizuki, Reina Miyazaki, Rika Mayama, Natsu Anno, Ayaka Yasumoto, Aika Hirota, Mirei Hoshina, Rio Koike, Hirono Suzuki, Rina Matsuno, Hinata Kashiwagi

== Track listing ==
| No. | Title | Credits | Length |
|---|---|---|---|
| 1. | "The Tissue (Tomaranai Seishun)" (ザ・ティッシュ～とまらない青春～, "The Tissue (Unstoppable Youth)") | Lyrics, music, arrangement: Kenichi Maeyamada; Chorus: Rika Mayama, Aika Hirota, Hinata Kashiwagi |
| 2. | "Ebichū Isshūkan" (エビ中一週間, "One Week in a Shrimp") | Lyrics, music, arrangement: Kenichi Maeyamada; Chorus: Aika Hirota, Hinata Kashiwagi, Kenichi Maeyamada |
| 3. | "The Tissue (Tomaranai Seishun) (karaoke)" (ザ・ティッシュ～とまらない青春～（karaoke）) |
| 4. | "Ebichū Isshūkan (karaoke)" (エビ中一週間（karaoke）) |

== Charts ==
| Chart (2011) | Peak position |
|---|---|
| Oricon Daily Singles Chart | 17 |
| Oricon Weekly Singles Chart | 73 |
| Billboard Japan Hot Singles Sales | 64 |
| Billboard Japan Top Independent Albums and Singles | 15 |
