= Motto Hashire!! =

Single by Shiritsu Ebisu Chugaku

from the album Ebichū no Zeppan Best: Owaranai Seishun
- B-side: "Uretai Emotion!"; "Eien ni Chūgakusei"
- Released: October 5, 2011 (Japan)
- Genre: Pop
- Label: Stardust Ongaku Shuppan
- Songwriters: Kenichi Maeyamada; Satsuki ga Tenkomori

Shiritsu Ebisu Chugaku singles chronology
"Oh My Ghost? (Watashi ga Akuryō ni Natte mo)" (2011)	"Motto Hashire!!" (2011)	"Karikeiyaku no Cinderella" (2012)

Music video
- "Motto Hashire!!" on YouTube

"Motto Hashire!!" (もっと走れっ!!; "Run Faster!!") is the fifth indie single by the Japanese girl idol group Shiritsu Ebisu Chugaku (or sixth counting one cover single), released in Japan on October 5, 2011 on the indie label Stardust Ongaku Shuppan.

== Composition ==
Jacques Offenbach's Infernal Galop (known as can-can) is used in the title song, "Motto Hashire!!"

== History ==
The single achieved the 7th position in the Oricon Daily Singles Chart. In the Oricon Weekly Singles Chart, it ranked 46th (in the chart from November 14, 2011).

== Members ==
Mizuki, Reina Miyazaki, Rika Mayama, Natsu Anno, Ayaka Yasumoto, Aika Hirota, Mirei Hoshina, Hirono Suzuki, Rina Matsuno, Hinata Kashiwagi

== Track listing ==
No.	Title	Credits	Length
1.	"Motto Hashire!!" (もっと走れっ!!, "Run Faster!!")	Lyrics, music, arrangement: Kenichi Maeyamada; Chorus: Aika Hirota, Hinata Kashiwagi
2.	"Uretai Emotion!" (売れたいエモーション!, "Emotion of Wanting to Be Successful!")	Lyrics, music, arrangement: Satsuki ga Tenkomori; Chorus: Ayaka Yasumoto, Aika Hirota, Hinata Kashiwagi
3.	"Eien ni Chūgakusei" (永遠に中学生, "Middle School Students Forever")	Lyrics, music, arrangement: Kenichi Maeyamada; Chorus: Ayaka Yasumoto, Aika Hirota, Hinata Kashiwagi
4.	"Motto Hashire!! (Off Vocal Ver.)" (もっと走れっ!!（Off Vocal ver.）)
5.	"Uretai Emotion (Off Vocal Ver.)" (売れたいエモーション!（Off Vocal ver.）)
6.	"Eien ni Chūgakusei (Off Vocal Ver.)" (永遠に中学生（Off Vocal ver.）)

== Charts ==
Chart (2011)	Peak position
Oricon Daily Singles Chart	7
Oricon Weekly Singles Chart	46
Oricon Yearly Indie Singles Chart	19
Billboard Japan Hot Singles Sales	37
Billboard Japan Top Independent Albums and Singles	8
