= Massugu =

"まっすぐ"

Single by Shiritsu Ebisu Chugaku

from the album "Chūsotsu": Ebichū no Ike Ike Best
- A-side: "Massugu"
- B-side: "Summer Dejavu" (lim. ed. A); "Iitomo" (lim. ed. B); "Chan-chara-chan" (lim. ed. C)
- Released: September 21, 2016 (Japan)
- Genre: J-pop
- Label: SME Records
- Songwriter: Katsuhiko Sugiyama

Shiritsu Ebisu Chugaku singles chronology
"Super Hero" (2015)	"まっすぐ" (2016)

Music video
- "Massugu" on YouTube (SMEJ channel)

Professional ratings
Review scores
Source	Rating
CDJournal	Favorable

"Massugu" (まっすぐ) is the 10th major-label single by the Japanese girl idol group Shiritsu Ebisu Chugaku. It was released in Japan on September 21, 2016, on the label SME Records. This is the last single featuring Rina Matsuno, who died on February 8, 2017.

== Release details ==
The CD single was released in three editions: Limited Edition A (完全生産限定盤A), Limited Edition B, and Limited Edition C. The differences between the editions are the cover art and the B-sides.

== Reception ==
According to Oricon, in its first week of release the physical CD single sold 14,446 copies. It debuted at number 7 in the Oricon weekly singles chart.

== Track listing ==
=== Limited Edition A ===
CD
No.	Title	Length
1.	"Massugu" (まっすぐ)
2.	"Summer Dejavu" (summer dejavu)
3.	"Massugu (Less Vocal)"
4.	"Summer Dejavu (Less Vocal)"

=== Limited Edition B ===
CD
No.	Title	Length
1.	"Massugu"
2.	"Iitomo" (イイトモ)
3.	"Massugu (Less Vocal)"
4.	"Iitomo (Less Vocal)"

=== Limited Edition C ===
CD
No.	Title	Length
1.	"Massugu"
2.	"Chan-chara-chan" (CHAN-CHARA-CHAN)
3.	"Massugu (Less Vocal)"
4.	"Chan-chara-chan (Less Vocal)"

== Charts ==
Chart (2016)	Peak position
Japan (Oricon)	7
