= Arata Furuta =

Japanese actor (born 1965)

- 古田 新太
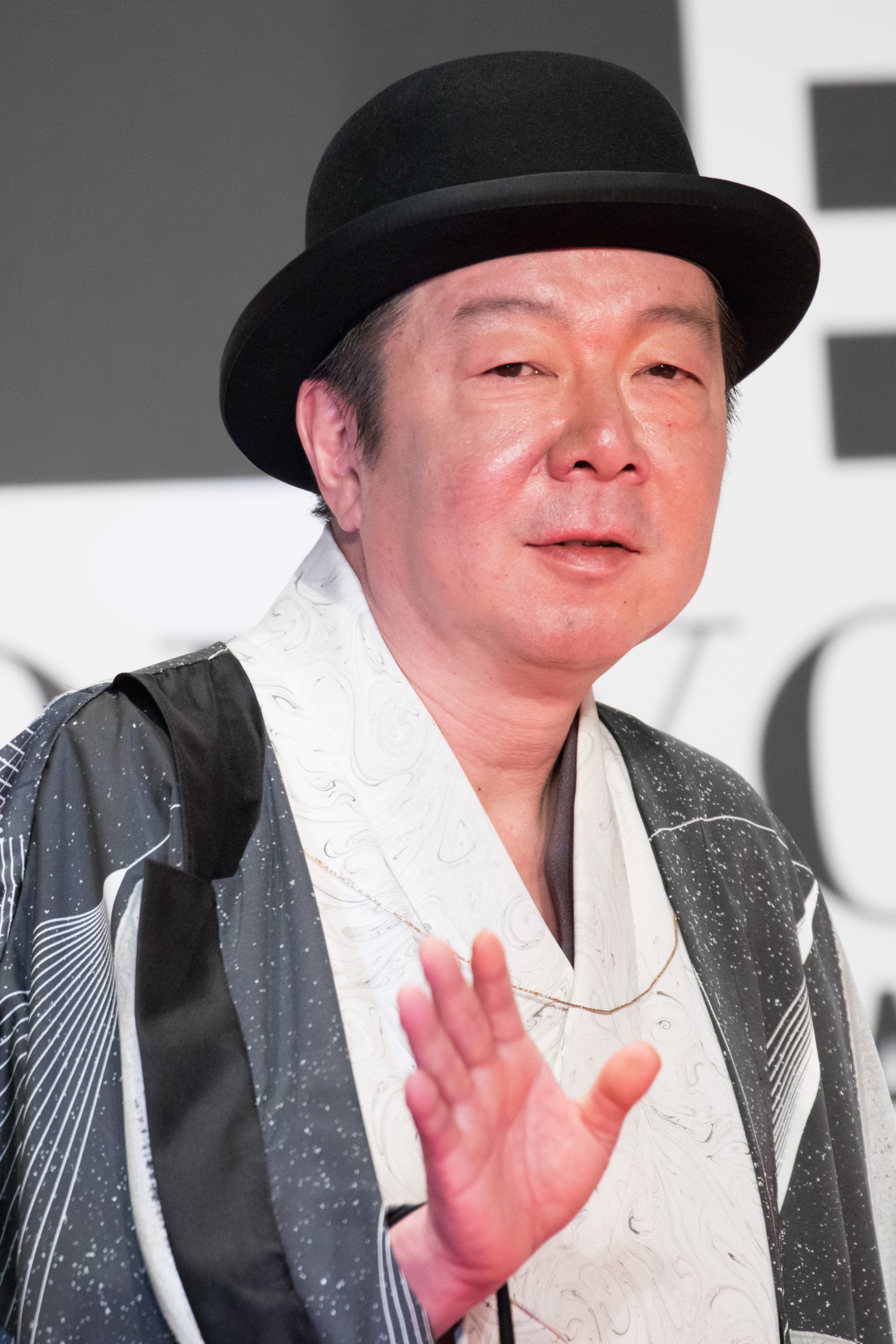
- Furuta at the Opening Ceremony of the Tokyo International Film Festival 2016
- Born: Takefumi Furuta; 3 December 1965 (age 60); Kobe, Hyōgo Prefecture, Japan
- Occupation: Actor

Arata Furuta (古田 新太, Furuta Arata; born Furuta Takefumi, December 3, 1965) is a Japanese theatre and film character actor.

== Biography ==
Furata has a broad range that goes from playing serious salary men, to bushi in period drama roles, and even women.

He works with the theatrical troupe called Otona Keikaku and often with the troupe Gekidan Shinkansen. Furuta also stars in the 2007 horror film Apartment 1303.

== Personal life ==
He is married to the television talent Yayoi Nishihata.

== Selected filmography ==
=== Film ===
Year	Title	Role	Note
2002	Ninpuu Sentai Hurricaneger: Shushutto – The Movie		
2004	Zebraman	Eggplant vendor	
2006	Hana	Sadashiro	
2006	Apartment 1303		
2007	A Dog on Sidecar	Makoto Kondo	
2008	Hidden Fortress: The Last Princess	Slave trader	
2008	Komori Seikatsu Kojo Club		
2010	13 Assassins		
2015	April Fools		
2016	Too Young to Die!		
2016	Nobunaga Concerto	Matsunaga Hisahide	
2016	One Piece Film: Gold	Pork and Kent Beef Jr.	Voice-role
2016	Shin Godzilla		
2016	Rudolf the Black Cat	Devil	Voice-role
2017	Napping Princess	Watanabe	Voice-role
2017	Pokémon the Movie: I Choose You!	Bonji	Voice-role
2017	Asura Girl: Blood-C Another Story	Amakatsu	
2017	Destiny: The Tale of Kamakura		
2019	Promare	Deus Prometh	Voice-role
2019	Dragon Quest: Your Story	Buon	Voice-role
2020	Nōten Paradise		
2020	Not Quite Dead Yet		
2021	Jump!! The Heroes Behind the Gold	Koichi Kanzaki	
2021	Kamen Rider: Beyond Generations	Hideo Momose	
2021	Intolerance		Lead role
2022	Kappei		
2023	The Village	Shūsaku Ōhashi	
2024	Silent Love	Ippei Kunita	
2025	She Taught Me Serendipity	Sasaki	
2025	Beethoven Fabrication	Ludwig van Beethoven	
2025	One Last Throw	Masayuki Kakefu	
2025	Gorilla Hall	Muranaka	

=== Television dramas ===
- Shinsengumi! (2004)
- Tokyo Friends (2005)
- Oh! My Girl!! (2008)
- Amachan (2013), Taichi Aramaki
- Doctor-X: Surgeon Michiko Daimon (2014), Kiyoshiro Fujikawa (episodes 7–11)
- Botchan (2016)
- Daddy Sister (2016)
- The Full-Time Wife Escapist (2016)
- Shimokitazawa Die Hard (2017)
- Fugitive Boys (2017)
- Yell (2020), Homare Hatsukaichi
- What Will You Do, Ieyasu? (2023), Ashikaga Yoshiaki
- Let’s Get a Divorce (2023)
- Fixer season 3 (2023)
- Extremely Inappropriate! (2024), Yuzuru Inushima
- Extremely Inappropriate! Special (2026), Yuzuru Inushima
- Did Someone Happen to Mention Me? (2026)
- The Shogunate Rebel (2027), Muragaki Norimasa

=== Television animation ===
- PopoloCrois Monogatari (1998), Gamigami Devil
- One Piece (2014), Byrnndi World (One Piece 3D2Y)
- Shinya! Tensai Bakabon (2018), Bakabon's Papa

=== Video games ===
- Ni no Kuni: Dominion of the Dark Djinn (2010), Drippy

Recordings reused in Ni no Kuni: Wrath of the White Witch (2011)

=== Dubbing ===
- Paddington (Henry Brown (Hugh Bonneville))
- Paddington 2 (Henry Brown (Hugh Bonneville))
- Paddington in Peru (Henry Brown (Hugh Bonneville))
- Power Rangers (Zordon (Bryan Cranston))

== Awards and nominations ==
Year	Award	Category	Work(s)	Result	Ref
2021	46th Hochi Film Awards	Best Actor	Intolerance	Nominated	
2022	43rd Yokohama Film Festival	Best Actor	Intolerance	Won	
2022	76th Mainichi Film Awards	Best Actor	Intolerance	Nominated	
