= Ebichū no Zeppan Best: Owaranai Seishun =

Greatest hits album by Shiritsu Ebisu Chugaku
- Released: November 21, 2012 (Japan)
- Genre: J-pop, pop
- Label: Defstar Records

Shiritsu Ebisu Chugaku chronology
Ebichū no Zeppan Best: Owaranai Seishun (2012)	Chunin (2013)

Singles from Ebichū no Zeppan Best: Owaranai Seishun
- 1. "Asa no Chime ga Narimashita!" Released: February 14, 2010; 2. "Ebizori Diamond!!" Released: August 7, 2010; 3. "Chime! / Doshaburi Regret" Released: January 10, 2010; 4. "The Tissue (Tomaranai Seishun)" Released: April 27, 2011; 5. "Oh My Ghost? (Watashi ga Akuryō ni Natte mo)" Released: July 27, 2011; 6. "Motto Hashire!!" Released: October 5, 2011

Ebichū no Zeppan Best: Owaranai Seishun (エビ中の絶盤ベスト～おわらない青春～, "Ebichu's Best of Out of Print: Neverending Youth") is a best-of-indies album by the Japanese girl group Shiritsu Ebisu Chugaku (also called Ebichu for short). It was released on November 21, 2012 on the Sony Music Entertainment Japan's label Defstar Records.

== Background ==
The album is primarily a complete collection of the songs from Shiritsu Ebisu Chugaku's six indie singles. It also contains five tracks that were not released on CD before: "Ebiture", "Ebichū Shusseki Bangō no Uta Sono 1", "Isshō Tomodachi", "Mata Ashita", "Yakusoku". The first track, titled "Ebiture", is a warm-up opening number that starts Ebichu's concerts.

== Track listing ==
CD
No.	Title	Notes	Length
1.	"Ebiture" (ebiture Ebichūre)	First time on CD
2.	"Naniganandemo (Ebichu Ver.)" (なにがなんでも（エビ中ver.）, "Whatever It Takes")	From the Ebichu's cover single; the song is originally by Sakurakko Club
3.	"Dai Bakuhatsu No. 1" (大爆発NO.1, "The Big Explosion No. 1")	From the Ebichu's cover single; the song is originally by Zone
4.	"Ebizori Diamond!!" (えびぞりダイアモンド!!, "Shrimp Jump Diamond")	1st single
5.	"Chime!" (チャイム!, "School Bell!")	2nd single
6.	"Doshaburi Regret" (どしゃぶりリグレット, "Heavy-raining Regret")	2nd single
7.	"The Tissue (Tomaranai Seishun)" (ザ・ティッシュ〜とまらない青春〜, "The Tissue (Unstoppable Youth)")	3rd single
8.	"Ebichū Isshūkan" (エビ中一週間, "One Week in a Shrimp")	3rd single "The Tissue (Tomaranai Seishun)" coupling track
9.	"Oh My Ghost? (Watashi ga Akuryō ni Natte mo)" (オーマイゴースト?〜わたしが悪霊になっても〜, "Oh My Ghost? (Even if I Turn into an Evil Spirit)")	4th single
10.	"Gozonji! Ebichū Ondo"" (ご存知!エビ中音頭, "You Know! Ebichu Marching Song")	4th single "Oh My Ghost? (Watashi ga Akuryō ni Natte mo)" coupling track
11.	"Motto Hashire!!" (もっと走れっ!!, "Run Faster!!")	5th single
12.	"Uretai Emotion!" (売れたいエモーション!, "Emotion of Wanting to Be Successful!")	5th single "Motto Hashire!!" coupling track
13.	"Eien ni Chūgakusei" (永遠に中学生, "Middle School Students Forever")	5th single "Motto Hashire!!" coupling track
14.	"Ebichū Shusseki Bangō no Uta Sono 1" (エビ中 出席番号のうた その1, "Ebichu Student Numbers Song Part 1")	First time on CD
15.	"Isshō Tomodachi" (イッショウトモダチ, "Best Friends")	First time on CD
16.	"Yakusoku" (約束, "Promise")	First time on CD (Cover of Power Age)
17.	"Mata Ashita" (また明日, "See You Tomorrow")	First time on CD

== Bonuses ==
First press

- A trading card randomly selected from 9 kinds
- Ticket for a buyer-selectable lottery
  - Award Ē: TBA
  - Award Bī: Signing event ticket

Store benefits

- A poster featuring covers of the group's indie singles

== Charts ==
Chart (2012)	Peak position	Sales (Oricon)	
Chart (2012)	Peak position	First week	Total
Oricon Daily Albums Chart	9		
Oricon Weekly Albums Chart	19	8,760	8,760
