= Mikakunin Chūgakusei X =

- Cover of Limited Edition Alpha

Single by Shiritsu Ebisu Chugaku

from the album Kinpachi
- Released: November 20, 2013 (Japan)
- Genre: J-pop, pop
- Label: Defstar Records
- Songwriter: Imakisasa

Shiritsu Ebisu Chugaku singles chronology
"Te o Tsunagō / Kindan no Karma" (2013)	"Mikakunin Chūgakusei X" (2013)	"Butterfly Effect" (2014)

Music videos
- "Mikakunin Chūgakusei X" (VEVO) on YouTube
- "Mikakunin Chūgakusei X" (SMEJ) on YouTube
- "U.B.U." (SMEJ) on YouTube

Professional ratings
Review scores
Source	Rating
Rolling Stone Japan	3/5 stars

"Mikakunin Chūgakusei X" (未確認中学生X; "Unidentified Middle School Student(s) X") is the 5th major single by the Japanese girl idol group Shiritsu Ebisu Chugaku. It is to be released in Japan on November 20, 2013 by Defstar Records.

== Release details ==
The single will be released in three versions: Limited Edition A, Limited Edition B, and Subculture Edition (Regular Edition).

== Track listing ==
=== Limited Alpha Edition ===
No.	Title	Credits	Length
1.	"Mikakunin Chūgakusei X" (未確認中学生X)	Lyrics, music: Imakisasa; Arrangement: Apazzi, Imakisasa
2.	"U.B.U."	Lyrics: Takafumi Ikeda, Mannequin Sensei; Music, arrangement: Takafumi Ikeda
3.	"I'm Your Manager!!!" (I'm your MANAGER!!!)	Lyrics: Kenichi Maeyamada, everyone from Twitter; Music, arrangement: Kenichi Maeyamada

=== Limited Beta Edition ===
No.	Title	Credits	Length
1.	"Mikakunin Chūgakusei X"
2.	"U.B.U."
3.	"Tsukatte Portfolio" (使ってポートフォリオ)	Lyrics, music: Satsuki ga Tenkomori; Arrangement: Masaya Ōya

=== Subculture Edition (Regular Edition) ===
No.	Title	Credits	Length
1.	"Mikakunin Chūgakusei X"
2.	"U.B.U."
3.	"Thanks! Merry Christmas K"	Lyrics: Junko Tsuji, Takeshi Isozaki; Music: Kōji Ueda, Takeshi Isozaki; Arrangement: Kōji Ueda, Ryōsei Kawabata

== Charts ==
Chart (2013)	Peak position
Oricon Daily Singles Chart	1
Oricon Weekly Singles Chart	4
