= Super Hero (Shiritsu Ebisu Chugaku song) =

2015 single by Shiritsu Ebisu Chugaku

Single by Shiritsu Ebisu Chugaku

from the album Anarchy
- A-side: "Super Hero"
- B-side: "Korya Mede Te na" (Regular Ed.); "Pompara Pecoruna Papiyotta" (Lim. Ed. A); "Kirakiranesskiraness" (Lim. Ed. B)
- Released: October 21, 2015 (Japan)
- Genre: J-pop
- Label: SME Records

Shiritsu Ebisu Chugaku singles chronology
"Natsudaze Johnny" (2015)	"Super Hero" (2015)	"Massugu" (2016)

Music video
- "Super Hero" (VEVO) "Super Hero" (SMEJ); 5572320 "Pompara Pekoluna Papiyotta" on YouTube

Professional ratings
Review scores
Source	Rating
CDJournal	Favorable

"Super Hero", or "Superhero", (スーパーヒーロー, Sūpāhīrō) is the 9th major-label single by the Japanese girl idol group Shiritsu Ebisu Chugaku. It was released in Japan on October 21, 2015, on the label SME Records.

== Release details ==
The CD single was released in three versions: a "regular edition" and two limited editions: Limited Edition A and Limited Edition B. The differences between the editions are the cover art and the B-sides.

=== B-sides ===
One of the B-sides, the song "Pompara Pekoluna Papiyotta", is performed by the rock group 5572320 (五五七二三二〇, Go Go Nana Ni San Ni Rei), which was created from the members of Shiritsu Ebisu Chugaku as part of celebration of the 50th anniversary of the Coconut Sable cookies produced by Nissin Cisco Co., Ltd.

== Reception ==
According to Oricon, in its first week of release the physical CD single sold 69,000 copies. It debuted at number 3 in the Oricon weekly singles chart. Thus in its first week the CD single already topped the overall sales of the group's 7th single "Haitateki!" and became the best selling single in the band's history.

According to Oricon, it was also the 81st best selling CD single of 2015 in Japan.

== Track listing ==
=== Regular Edition ===
CD
No.	Title	Length
1.	"Super Hero" (スーパーヒーロー)
2.	"Korya Mede Te na" (こりゃめでてぇな)
3.	"Super Hero (Less Vocal)"
4.	"Korya Mede Te na (Less Vocal)"

=== Limited Edition A ===
CD
No.	Title	Length
1.	"Super Hero"
2.	"Pompara Pecoruna Papiyotta" (ポンパラ ペコルナ パピヨッタ) (performed by the band 5572320)
3.	"Super Hero (Less Vocal)"
4.	"Ponpara Pecoruna Papiyotta (Less Vocal)"

=== Limited Edition B ===
CD
No.	Title	Length
1.	"Super Hero"
2.	"Kirakiranesskiraness" (キラキラネスキラネス)
3.	"Super Hero (Less Vocal)"
4.	"Kirakiranesskiraness (Less Vocal)"

== Charts ==
Chart (2015)	Peak position
Oricon Daily Singles Chart	2
Oricon Weekly Singles Chart	3

=== Year-end charts ===
Chart (2015)	Peak position
Oricon Year-end Chart	81
