= Shiritsu Ebisu Chugaku =

Japanese female idol group

Shiritsu Ebisu Chugaku 私立恵比寿中学
- Also known as: Ebichu; King of Gakugeeeekai; 5572320; Infinities
- Origin: Tokyo, Japan
- Genres: J-pop; pop; rock
- Years active: 2009–present
- Labels: Stardust Ongaku Shuppan (2010–2011); Defstar Records (2012–2015); SME Records (2015–present)
- Members: Rika Mayama; Ayaka Yasumoto; Riko Nakayama; Cocona Sakuragi; Yuno Kokubo; Nonoka Kazami; Emma Sakurai; Yuna Nakamura
- Past members: Kanon; Narumi Uno; Hinaki Yano; Rio Koike; Reina Miyazaki; Mizuki; Natsu Anno; Hirono Suzuki; Rina Matsuno† (deceased); Aika Hirota; Hinata Kashiwagi; Mirei Hoshina; Kaho Kobayashi
- Website: shiritsuebichu.jp

Shiritsu Ebisu Chugaku (私立恵比寿中学, Shiritsu Ebisu Chūgaku; literally "Ebisu Private Junior High School") is a Japanese female idol group. The group's name is officially shortened to Ebichu (えびちゅう、エビ中). The group was created by 3B Junior, the third section of the talent agency Stardust Promotion. Shiritsu Ebisu Chugaku is considered a "little sister" group to another Stardust Promotion girl group, Momoiro Clover Z.

Shiritsu Ebisu Chugaku is named after a fictitious school in Ebisu, a neighborhood in Shibuya, Tokyo. It was planned as a group of elementary and middle school students. However, this concept has changed as the members aged. The group currently uses "Forever a Middle-schooler" as their concept.

The group was officially nicknamed "King of the School Play", and was advertised as being a group with very rough singing and dancing skills. Or, more accurately, the group's slogan at the time was "Unarticulated dance and shaky vocals." However, the group has outgrown said slogan over time, and have since reached a point where they're praised for their vocal skills. Originally formed as a quintet on August 4, 2009, the lineup has changed multiple times since then, with some members having "changed school" (the group's official term for leaving it) and some having "transferred in" (joined).

== History ==
=== Formation and "indie" years (2009–2012) ===
Logo

Ebichu was formed as a quintet on August 4, 2009. The original lineup consisted of Kanon, Mizuki, Narumi Uno, Reina Miyazaki and Rika Mayama. The group started out performing short sets (often opening for Momoiro Clover) at malls and shopping centers. In October, Ayaka Yasumoto and Natsu Anno were added to the lineup.

On February 14, 2010, Kanon announced her departure from the group. On the same day, Hinaki Yano was announced as a new member. The group's first single "Asa no Chime ga Narimashita" was released the same day as well.

In April, Aika Hirota was added as a new member. One month later in May, four new members: Mirei Hoshina, Rio Koike, Hirono Suzuki and Rina Matsuno, were announced, bringing the total number of members to 12.

The group released their second single, "Ebizori Diamond!!", on August 7.

On November 23, it was announced that Narumi Uno would be departing the group on January 10. In addition, Hinata Kashiwagi was announced as a new member. From this day until Uno's departure, the group's lineup reached its peak at 13 members.

On January 10, 2011, the group released their third single "Chime! / Doshaburi Regret". Narumi Uno departed the same day.

It was announced on February 21 that Hinaki Yano would depart from the group, and her final performance would take place on March 20. However, due to the 2011 Tōhoku earthquake and tsunami, her departure was postponed to April 17. On April 27, the group released their 4th single "The Tissue ~Tomaranai Seishun~".

Rio Koike announced through a blog post on June 7, that she would be departing from the group to focus on her education.

In June, it was announced that Ebichu was to hold their first solo concert, on October 8 at Shibuya O-East. Parts of it were released on the band's first live DVD, which was released on February 15 of the next year. In total, Ebichu gave three sold-out performances in October.

Two more singles, "Oh My Ghost? ~Watashi ga Akuryou ni Nattemo~" and "Motto Hashire!!", were released in July and October respectively.

Reina Miyazaki announced her departure from the group in December. This would be Ebichu's last lineup change for several years.

As of March 2012, there were nine members and the only two original members who still remained in the group were Mayama and Mizuki. Although in April 2012 they both entered high school, it was decided that they would remain in the group. They started joking that they were middle school students forever.

=== Major label debut and Chunin (2012–2013) ===
After six "indie" singles on their talent agency's recording label, the latest few of which charted on Oricon, the group signed a temporary contract with the major label Defstar Records to release a single titled, incidentally, "Karikeiyaku no Cinderella" ("Temporary Contract Cinderella"). The release date had already been determined as May 5, 2012, the Children's Day. The contract signing was made into a ceremony, which was held on March 4 in the presence of a large audience of fans. The single "Karikeiyaku no Cinderella" debuted at number 7 in the Oricon daily ranking for May 1. Having peaked in the daily chart at number 2, it also debuted at number 7 in the Oricon Weekly Singles Chart.

From March 11 to May 20, Ebichu embarked on their first major tour, titled "Shiritsu Ebisu Chugaku Spring DefSTAR Tour 2012 ~Korya Haru kara Ebi ga ii!~", totaling 26 performances.

On June 25, 2012, Shiritsu Ebisu Chugaku performed at "Yubi Matsuri", an idol festival produced by Rino Sashihara from AKB48. The concert was held at Nippon Budokan before a crowd of 8,000 people and featured such girl groups as Idoling!!!, Super Girls, Tokyo Girls' Style, Nogizaka46, Passpo, Buono!, Momoiro Clover Z, and Watarirouka Hashiritai 7.

On July 1, 2012, Ebichu held a three and a half hour solo concert at Nippon Seinenkan. The show was called "Jā Best Ten" and featured an imaginary ranking of the group's songs, counted down in the style of 1980s music TV shows. It also included the first public performance of the song "Go! Go! Here We Go! Rock Lee", a closing theme of the anime Naruto SD, to be released as the group's second single in August.

From July 14 to September 16, Ebichu embarked on a Summer tour titled "Shiritsu Ebisu Chugaku Summer DefSTAR Saikyou Tour 2012 ~Hajikeru Ase no Shio Tengoku~", totaling 19 performances.

Ebichu's 2nd major single, "Go! Go! Here We Go! Rock Lee / Otona wa Wakattekurenai" was released on August 29, and reached number 7 on the weekly chart.

From November 4 to January 20, Ebichu conducted a winter tour, titled "Shiritsu Ebisu Chugaku Winter DefSTAR Gokujo Tour 2012–2013 ~KING OF GAKUGEEEEKAI of Chu of LIFE~", totaling 15 performances.

On November 21, Ebichu released a compilation album titled "Ebichu no Zeppan Best: Owaranai Seishun", featuring all the material released during their "Indie" years.

On December 15, the group held a solo concert at Nakano Sunplaza titled "Ebichu no Jungle Daibouken".

Ebichu's 3rd single, titled "Ume" was released on January 16, 2013. The girls declared that they were aiming for third place in the Oricon chart with their third single, a goal that they managed to achieve.

From April 21 to June 9, Ebichu went on tour, this time titled "Shiritsu Ebisu Chugaku Spring DefSTAR Tonden Tour 2013 ~Chance wa Ima da! Kou-unki ni Notte Yoikorasho~", totaling 12 performances.

Their 4th single "Te o Tsunagō / Kindan no Karma", featuring two ending theme songs for Pocket Monsters Best Wishes Season 2, was released on June 5.

Ebichu released their 1st studio album "Chunin" on July 24, containing tracks from all 4 singles released since their major label debut

On July 28, Ebichu held an outdoor concert titled "Ebichu Natsu no Family Ensoku" or "Famien" for short. The outdoor summer "Famien" concerts have since become an annual event, being held every year since 2013.

From September 22 to November 17, Ebichu held another tour, "Shiritsu Ebisu Chugaku Autumn DefSTAR COMECOME Tour 2013 ~Deluxe Jam Jamboree Neo~" totaling 15 performances.

Their 5th single "Mikakunin Chugakusei X" was released on November 20.

On December 8, Ebichu performed a standalone concert at Saitama Super Arena, beating the record held by SID for fastest performance at the venue since a group's debut.

On December 28 it was announced that 3 members, Mizuki, Natsu Anno and Hirono Suzuki, would be leaving the group, and that their last concert would be held on April 15, 2014, at the Nippon Budokan. After leaving, they will focus on acting, as well as their academics.

=== Lineup changes and Kinpachi (2014–2015) ===
On January 4, it was announced that Kaho Kobayashi and Riko Nakayama, both former members of the training unit "Team Daio-Ika", would be joining Ebichu as new members. From this day until April 15, Ebichu would consist of 11 members. However, the new members did not share the stage with the 3 departing members during this period.

On March 9, the "Chunin" era lineup, minus Anno who was studying abroad, performed a concert at Makuhari Event Hall in Chiba, titled "Luck To The Future". 12 days later, on March 21, the new 8 member lineup with Kobayashi and Nakayama performed the same setlist at Grand Cube Osaka.

On April 15, Ebichu held a concert titled "Shiritsu Ebisu Chugaku Goudou Shuppatsushiki ~Ima, Kimi ga Koko ni Iru~", at the Nippon Budokan. This was their last performance with Mizuki, Anno and Suzuki. The main set was performed by the "Chunin" lineup, with Kobayashi and Nakayama joining them for the encore. The encore was the only time that the 3 departing members performed together with the 2 new members.

From April 27 to June 15, Ebichu held their first tour with Kobayashi and Nakayama, titled "Shiritsu Ebisu Chugaku Spring Sony Music Labels Rookie Tour 2014 ~Umare Kawari Chou Chou Born to Etcetera~", totaling 13 performances.

On June 4, Ebichu released their 6th single "Butterfly Effect", their first release featuring Kobayashi and Nakayama.

The second installment of the annual "Famien" summer outdoor concerts was held on August 2.

From September 15 to October 12, a short tour titled "Shiritsu Ebisu Chugaku Autumn Sony Music Labels Hanuke Tour 2014 ~Doukasen Pachipachi hahaha n~" was held, totaling 4 performances.

On November 5, Ebichu released their 7th single "Haitateki!".

Ebichu performed several large-scale concerts in November and December, performing at Yokohama Arena, Kobe World Kinen Hall, and Ariake Colosseum.

On January 28, 2015, Ebichu released their second studio album "Kinpachi", featuring all singles released after "Chunin", with tracks from the previous lineup being re-recorded. In support of the album, they embarked on a tour titled "Shiritsu Ebisu Chugaku Tobidase Zen-Juu Hall Tour 2015 ~Wakkuwaku Haru Balloon GOGO~", totaling 13 performances.

On February 6, Ebichu made their first appearance on the popular music TV show "Music Station", and performed the title track to their new album.

=== Anarchy (2015–2016) ===
In March, under the name 5572320, Ebichu was chosen to promote the "Coconut Sable" brand of cookies. They digitally released the song "Hanseiki Yūtōsei" on March 25, and continued to release songs as 5572320 into 2016.

On June 17, Ebichu released their 8th single "Natsudaze Johnny".

The third installment of the annual "Famien" summer outdoor concerts was held on August 22.

On September 22, Ebichu performed a special concert in Akita prefecture, titled "Akita Bunkou". This has also since become an annual event in the following years.

Ebichu's 9th single "Superhero" was released on October 21.

Ebichu returned to Saitama Super Arena and performed two consecutive nights on December 12–13.

On December 17, it was announced that Hinata Kashiwagi had been diagnosed with sudden deafness and that the release of the group's third album "Anarchy", scheduled for release on 10 February 2016, had been postponed for an indefinite period of time.

After the delay, Ebichu's third studio album "Anarchy" was released on April 20, 2016. To support the album, Ebichu embarked on a 15 date tour titled "Shiritsu Ebisu Chugaku Japan Hall Keikiiii Tour 2016 ~the snack bar in gakugeeeekai~".

The fourth annual "Famien" was held on August 20.

On August 27, it was announced that Kaho Kobayashi had been diagnosed with a mild case of Graves' Disease. As a result, Kobyashi, along with Kashiwagi who injured her foot, would only participate vocally for concerts, and wouldn't participate in the dancing until December.

Ebichu's 10th single, "Massugu" was released on September 21.

From September 22 to November 3, the tour "Shiritsu Ebisu Chugaku Aki Tour 2016 ~Ebichu-tte Gen-eki Chugakusei Hitori mo inai Group nandatte!~" was held, totaling 6 concerts.

On November 6, the group simultaneously released two best-of albums, ""Chūsotsu": Ebichū no Ike Ike Best" and ""Chūkara": Ebichū no Waku Waku Best". The former featured the single "Massugu", while latter featured a new song, titled "Sudden Death". All songs released prior to "Butterfly Effect" have been re-recorded with Kobayashi and Nakayama.

In December, Ebichu performed two consecutive nights at Yoyogi Dai-ichi Taiikukan, where Kobayashi and Kashiwagi returned to regular performing.

=== Ebicracy (2017–2018) ===
On February 8, 2017, Rina Matsuno died, aged 18. She was unable to perform at her group's concert the previous day due to health issues, and she was taking medical treatment at her home in Tokyo. On the early morning of February 8, her condition suddenly worsened and unsuccessful. At around 5 AM, her parents called the 911 emergency services. She was taken in the ambulance, but was pronounced dead at the hospital that day. On February 10, it was revealed that the cause of death was a cardiac arrhythmia. In her last post on Instagram on February 6 before her death, she said that she had returned from a family trip to Hakone.

All upcoming concerts and events were cancelled, and the group went into a period of mourning plus with a farewell ceremony on the 25th.

The group's website continued listing Rina Matsuno as a member until April 1. It was then announced that the group would continue on with the remaining 7 members, and that a new album, titled "Ebicracy", would be released on May 31. The new album is the first Ebichu album to not feature any singles, consisting only of new material. "Ebicracy" charted at number 1 on both the Oricon and Billboard Japan weekly album charts, a first for Ebichu.

In support of the album, Ebichu embarked on a tour titled "Shiritsu Ebisu Chugaku IDOL march HALLTOUR 2017 ~Ima, Kimi to Koko ni Iru~", from April 22 to July 16. The last day of the tour, July 16, was Matsuno's birthday. After the show ended, an "end credits" video was played on screen, accompanied by a Rina Matsuno solo version of the song "Kanjou Densha", from "Ebicracy". This was possible because work on "Kanjou Densha" had begun earlier than the other songs, due to it being used in a commercial.

The fifth installment of the "Famien" summer concerts took place on August 26.

On August 31, Aika Hirota announced that she will be withdrawing from the group following a final concert on January 3, 2018.

On September 23, Ebichu performed a special autumn concert titled "Chūon", which has the audience remain seated, and features a live backing band. The members of Ebichu don't do choreographed dancing for the show, focusing all their energy on singing.

Ebichu's 11th single "Sing Along, Sing a Song" was released on November 8.

From October 8 to November 24, Ebichu's last tour with Hirota, "Shiritsu Ebisu Chugaku Autumn Nine Tour 2017 ~Ebichu-tte nanka Setsumei shizurai kedo Mitokanakya son-na Group nandatte!~" took place, totaling 9 concerts.

On January 3 and 4, 2018, Ebichu performed two consecutive shows at Nippon Budokan. The first, titled "forever aiai" was their last performance with Aika Hirota. The second, was their first performance with the current 6 member lineup, and was titled "ebichu pride".

=== 10th anniversary, MUSiC and playlist (2018–2021) ===
From April 21 to July 22, Ebichu embarked on their first tour with their current lineup, titled "Shiritsu Ebisu Chugaku SHAKARIKI SPRING TOUR 2018 ~New, Gakugeeeekai of Learning~ (Shin – Gakugeikai no Susume)", totaling 20 dates.

On May 23, Ebichu released a cover of "Jiyū e Michizure" by Ringo Sheena, as part of the tribute album "Adam to Eve no Ringo". The same day, Ebichu's discography was made available on music subscription services.

Ebichu's 12th single "Dekadonden" was released on June 6.

The sixth installment of the summer "Famien" shows, held for two days for the first time, took place on August 18–19.

On September 22, the second installment of the autumn "Chūon" shows took place.

From November 3 to December 1, Ebichu embarked on a 6 date tour titled "Shiristsu Ebisu Chugaku Aki Tour 2018 ~9nen-me, Gimu Kyouiku karano Sotsugyou~", with each date having a setlist decided by a different member.

From December 23 to 25, Ebichu performed 3 consecutive shows at Makuhari Event Hall. During the rehearsal for the second day, Mirei Hoshina fell from the stage, and was hospitalized. The following shows were performed with 5 members. While initially the extent of Hoshina's injuries was not made clear, it was later revealed that she had suffered a cerebral contusion, a fractured skull and a traumatic subarachnoid hemorrhage.

Hoshina made her return to the stage on February 17, 2019, performing one song with the other members. Following this, she continued to make limited appearances during concerts, gradually increasing the number of songs she participated in.

On March 13, Ebichu released their 5th album "MUSiC", the first in a series of releases commemorating their 10th anniversary as a group. The album contains the singles "Sing Along, Sing a Song" and "Dekadonden", with the former being re-recorded by the current lineup.

In support of the album, Ebichu embarked on a tour titled "Shiritsu Ebisu Chugaku Livehouse Tour 2019 ~Listen to the MUSiC~", totaling 10 dates.

On June 5, Ebichu released their 13th single "Trendy Girl".

On June 22, Ebichu hosted their own festival, "MUSiC Fes", featuring artists that the group has worked with over the years. This was the first full set that Hoshina performed with Ebichu since her fall.

The seventh annual "Famien" concert was held on August 17.

From September 20 to December 8, Ebichu embarked on a 16 date tour titled "Shiritsu Ebisu Chugaku Youkoso Aki Fuyu Hall Tour 2019 ~Sekai no Minasan Omedetou Idol tte Tanoshii~".

On October 18, it was announced that Ayaka Yasumoto would be going on an indefinite hiatus from the group, as she was experiencing instability both mentally and physically, and needed time to recuperate.

On December 18, Ebichu released their 6th album "playlist". The album features the single "Trendy Girl", and Ayaka Yasumoto fully participates on all of the songs. The album topped both the Oricon and Billboard Japan weekly charts, becoming the second Ebichu album to do so.

On December 20–21, Ebichu performed two consecutive shows at Makuhari Event Hall, featuring a live backing band.

On December 31, Ebichu held their first ever New Year's Countdown concert at Pacifico Yokohama.

On March 23, 2020, Ayaka Yasumoto announced that she would be gradually resuming activities.

Due to the COVID-19 pandemic and its impact on the performing arts, the tour in support of "playlist" (originally scheduled to take place from April to July) was cancelled, and the 2020 installments of both the "Famien" and "MUSiC Fes" concerts were postponed to 2021.

On September 19–20, the third installment of the "Chuon" shows, this time consisting of 4 performances (2 per day), was held. This marked the first time Ebichu performed in front of a live audience since the outbreak of COVID-19.

On October 29, it was announced that Ayaka Yasumoto had been diagnosed with Malignant Lymphoma, and would be going on an indefinite hiatus to focus on treatment.

Ebichu performed 3 shows titled "Ebichu to New Girl Comrade" on December 18, 26 and 27, at the Tokyo International Forum & the Tokyo Garden Theater. These shows featured an all female backing band.

On January 1, it was announced that Shiritsu Ebisu Chhugaku will recruit new members during 2021 (between 10 and 22 years old)

From March 6 to April 30, Ebichu embarked on a 6 date tour titled "Shiritsu Ebisu Chugaku Best at the moment series [6 Voices]". The tour symbolized the end of the 6 member lineup that lasted from January 2018.

On April 5, Ayaka Yasumoto announced that her cancer had been treated and was in a state of remission.

=== Self-titled album and lineup changes (2021–2022) ===
On May 5, Ebichu announced their first new members in 7 years: Cocona Sakuragi, Yuno Kokubo & Nonoka Kazami. The 3 new members are scheduled to make their live debut at Famien 2021 in August.

In June, Ebichu, minus Ayaka Yasumoto & the new members, embarked on a 3 date tour titled "Shiritsu Ebisu Chugaku Concept Live ~MOVE~", which focused on the theme of movement.

On July 16, Ebichu (minus the 3 new members) appeared on the popular music YouTube channel "The First Take", where they performed the song "Nanairo". This marked Ayaka Yasumoto's official return to the group.

On August 18, the compilation album "FAMIEN'21 L.P." was released, containing new 9 member versions of past Famien theme songs.

The 2021 installment of Famien, scheduled for August 21–22, was again cancelled.

The new members made their live performance debut at the "@Jam Expo" festival on August 29. However, Riko Nakayama could not participate due to ill health, thus postponing the true debut of the new 9 member lineup.

Ebichu held the fourth installment of the "Chuon" shows on September 25–26, consisting of 4 performances (2 per day).

On September 13, it was announced that Hinata Kashiwagi would be taking a break (scheduled for 3 months) from the group following the "Chuon" shows.

Kashiwagi returned to the group in November, and Ebichu performed 2 shows titled "Reboot" in December 2021.

Ebichu released their self titled 7th album on March 23, 2022. In support of the album and the 10th anniversary of their debut, they embarked on a tour titled "10th Anniversary Tour 2022 ~drawer~" from April 29 to July 9.

On April 3, 2022, Hinata Kashiwagi announced that she would be leaving the group in December 2022.

The 2022 installment of Famien was held on August 6–7. Kaho Kobayashi was absent from these shows due to illness.

A compilation album celebrating the 10th anniversary of their debut, titled "Chukichi", was released on September 21.

The fifth installment of the "Chuon" shows were held on September 24–25, consisting of 4 performances (2 per day)

On October 1, 2022 Ebichu announced their new members: Emma Sakurai & Yuna Nakamura.

Hinata Kashiwagi performed her last concert with the group on December 16 at the Makuhari Event Hall. The next day, Sakurai & Nakamura made their debut performance at the same venue.

=== indigo hour (2023-present) ===
Ebichu embarked on their "100% ebism" spring tour, starting on April 15 and running until July 16.

On May 3, 2023 Ebichu released their first CD single in 4 years, titled "kyo-do?".

The 2023 installment of Famien was held on August 5–6.

In October, the group introduced a new series of concerts titled "Orchera Disco", combining orchestra with dance music.

On October 14, the group flew out to New Zealand to perform as special guests at the annual Christchurch Japan Day festival.

On January 6–7, 2024 the group performed 2 shows at the Pia Arena MM, in Yokohama.

On January 31, Ebichu released the limited production single "Tokyo's Way!", the ending theme for the anime "Mashle: Magic and Muscles The Divine Visionary Candidate Exam Arc".

Ebichu released their 8th album indigo hour on February 28, 2024.

On November 25, it was announced that the group had agreed with Mirei Hoshina to end her contract, bringing the group back to a 9 member lineup.

On December 14, the new 9 member lineup performed their first show, a Christmas concert titled "Twinkle Twinkle ebiiiiiiiiii Star". The show was organized by Mayama, who planned everything from the setlist to the lighting and stage costumes.

On March 20, 2025, Ebichu returned to Saitama Super Arena for the first time in 10 years with their 15th anniversary concert "LOVE & BRAVE". Nearly 15,000 tickets were sold out for the show, setting a new high for the group's attendance.

On June 28, Kaho Kobayashi performed her last concert with the group at the Makuhari Event Hall.

== Musical style ==
The group has recorded songs in many different genres, including pop, heavy metal, melodic hardcore, R&B, city pop and electro. The Japan-based music website CDJournal in its review of their 2016 best-of album "Chūsotsu": Ebichū no Ike Ike Best noted the group's individuality, the musicality of the songs as well as how their lyrics made use of individuality of each member.

== Members ==
The members are assigned so-called attendance numbers, just like in Japanese schools. Initially the numbers were given in the order of joining the group, and were reassigned when members left/joined. However, after Reina Miyazaki's departure, the numbers of the departing members have been retired. In addition, since around the time of their major-label debut, the members also have individual colors assigned to them.

=== Current members ===
Attendance No.	Name	Date of birth	Date joined	Notes
3	Rika Mayama (真山りか)	December 16, 1996 (age 29)	August 4, 2009 (17 years, 3 months and 12 days)	Founding member
5	Ayaka Yasumoto (安本彩花)	June 27, 1998 (age 28)	October 3, 2009 (17 years, 1 month and 13 days)	MC in charge On hiatus from October 11, 2019 to March 22, 2020, and from October 29, 2020 to July 16, 2021.
12	Riko Nakayama (中山莉子)	October 28, 2000 (age 26)	January 4, 2014 (12 years, 10 months and 12 days)	
13	Cocona Sakuragi (桜木心菜)	September 14, 2005 (age 21)	May 5, 2021 (5 years, 6 months and 11 days)	
14	Yuno Kokubo (小久保柚乃)	March 20, 2007 (age 19)	May 5, 2021 (5 years, 6 months and 11 days)	
15	Nonoka Kazami (風見和香)	August 25, 2007 (age 19)	May 5, 2021 (5 years, 6 months and 11 days)	
16	Emma Sakurai (桜井えま)	September 5, 2007 (age 19)	October 1, 2022 (4 years, 1 month and 15 days)	Individual color was honey orange until July 12, 2026.
17	Yuna Nakamura (仲村悠菜)	May 29, 2007 (age 19)	October 1, 2022 (4 years, 1 month and 15 days)	Individual color was milk tea until July 12, 2026.

=== Former members ===
Attendance No.	Name	Date of birth	Date joined	Date Departed	Notes
1	Kanon (奏音)	February 7, 1997 (age 29)	August 4, 2009	February 14, 2010 (6 months and 10 days)	• Founding member Currently an actor
2	Narumi Uno (宇野愛海)	March 19, 1998 (age 28)	August 4, 2009	January 10, 2011 (1 year, 5 months and 6 days)	• Founding member Currently an actor / voice actor
7	Hinaki Yano (矢野妃菜喜)	March 5, 1997 (age 29)	February 14, 2010	April 17, 2011 (1 year, 2 months and 3 days)	Currently an actor / voice actor / musician
10	Rio Koike (小池梨緒)	January 18, 1998 (age 28)	May 22, 2010	June 7, 2011 (1 year and 16 days)	
2	Reina Miyazaki (宮﨑れいな)	August 24, 1997 (age 29)	August 4, 2009	December 26, 2011 (2 years, 4 months and 22 days)	• Founding member Former Leader
1	Mizuki (瑞季)	February 27, 1997 (age 29)	August 4, 2009	April 15, 2014 (4 years, 8 months and 11 days)	• Founding member 1st Dance leader Currently an actor / voice actor
4	Natsu Anno (杏野なつ)	July 12, 1997 (age 29)	October 3, 2009	April 15, 2014 (4 years, 6 months and 12 days)	1st MC in charge
8	Hirono Suzuki (鈴木裕乃)	March 24, 1998 (age 28)	May 22, 2010	April 15, 2014 (3 years, 10 months and 24 days)	Active as an actor until 2020
9	Rina Matsuno (松野莉奈)	July 16, 1998 *	May 22, 2010	February 8, 2017 (6 years, 8 months and 17 days)	*Deceased; February 8, 2017 (aged 18)
6	Aika Hirota (廣田あいか)	January 31, 1999 (age 27)	April 10, 2010	January 3, 2018 (7 years, 8 months and 24 days)	Currently a member of Maison de Queen
10	Hinata Kashiwagi (柏木ひなた)	March 29, 1999 (age 27)	November 28, 2010	December 16, 2022 (12 years and 18 days)	2nd Dance leader
7	Mirei Hoshina (星名美怜)	November 2, 1997 (age 29)	May 22, 2010	November 25, 2024 (14 years, 6 months and 3 days)	Currently an actor / model / singer
11	Kaho Kobayashi (小林歌穂)	June 12, 2000 (age 26)	January 4, 2014	June 28, 2025 (11 years, 5 months and 24 days)	Currently a graphic designer

Members without color departed prior to their assignment

=== Timeline ===
Note: Member Color Unassigned, Member on Hiatus

== Discography ==
=== Singles ===
No.	Title	Release date	Charts							Album
No.	Title	Release date	JP Oricon CD Singles	JP Oricon Singles	JP Billboard Top Singles	JP Billboard Hot 100	JP Billboard Top Independent	JP Billboard Streaming	JP Billboard Downloads	Album
Indie (Stardust Digital)
1*	"Asa no Chime ga Narimashita!" (朝のチャイムがなりました!)	February 14, 2010	—	—	—	—	—	—	—	Ebichū no Zeppan Best: Owaranai Seishun (エビ中の絶盤ベスト～おわらない青春～)
2	"Ebizori Diamond!!" (えびぞりダイアモンド!!)	August 7, 2010	—	—	—	—	—	—	—	Ebichū no Zeppan Best: Owaranai Seishun (エビ中の絶盤ベスト～おわらない青春～)
3	"Chime! / Doshaburi Regret" (チャイム! / どしゃぶりリグレット)	January 10, 2011	—	—	—	—	—	—	—	Ebichū no Zeppan Best: Owaranai Seishun (エビ中の絶盤ベスト～おわらない青春～)
4	"The Tissue (Tomaranai Seishun)" (ザ・ティッシュ～とまらない青春～)	April 27, 2011	73	—	64	—	15	—	—	Ebichū no Zeppan Best: Owaranai Seishun (エビ中の絶盤ベスト～おわらない青春～)
5	"Oh My Ghost? (Watashi ga Akuryō ni Natte mo)" (オーマイゴースト? ～わたしが悪霊になっても～)	July 27, 2011	59	—	47	—	10	—	—	Ebichū no Zeppan Best: Owaranai Seishun (エビ中の絶盤ベスト～おわらない青春～)
6	"Motto Hashire!!" (もっと走れっ!!)	October 5, 2011	46	—	37	—	8	—	—	Ebichū no Zeppan Best: Owaranai Seishun (エビ中の絶盤ベスト～おわらない青春～)
Major (Defstar Records)
1	"Karikeiyaku no Cinderella" (仮契約のシンデレラ)	May 5, 2012	7	—	6	15	—	—	—	Chunin (中人)
2	"Go! Go! Here We Go! Rock Lee / Otona wa Wakatte Kurenai"** (Go! Go! Here We Go! ロック・リー / 大人はわかってくれない)	August 29, 2012	7	—	6	19	—	—	—	Chunin (中人)
3	"Ume" (梅)	January 16, 2013	3	—	3	7	—	—	—	Chunin (中人)
4	"Te o Tsunagō / Kindan no Karma" (手をつなごう / 禁断のカルマ)	June 5, 2013	5	—	5	9	—	—	—	Chunin (中人)
5	"Mikakunin Chūgakusei X" (未確認中学生X)	November 20, 2013	4	—	4	8	—	—	—	Kinpachi (金八)
6	"Butterfly Effect" (バタフライエフェクト)	June 4, 2014	3	—	6	9	—	—	20	Kinpachi (金八)
7	"Haitateki!" (ハイタテキ!)	November 5, 2014	3	—	6	14	—	—	—	Kinpachi (金八)
8	"Natsudaze Johnny" (夏だぜジョニー)	June 17, 2015	2	—	6	13	—	—	53	Anarchy (穴空)
Major (SME Records)
9	"Super Hero" (スーパーヒーロー)	October 21, 2015	3	—	3	8	—	—	55	Anarchy (穴空)
10	"Massugu" (まっすぐ)	September 21, 2016	7	—	10	20	—	—	73	"Chūsotsu": Ebichū no Ike Ike Best (「中卒」〜エビ中のイケイケベスト〜)
11	"Sing Along, Sing a Song" (シンガロン・シンガソン)	November 8, 2017	2	—	2	2	—	—	50	MUSiC
12	"Dekadonden" (でかどんでん)	June 6, 2018	3	—	3	4	—	—	—	MUSiC
13	"Trendy Girl" (トレンディガール)	June 5, 2019	5	7	5	12	—	18	—	Playlist
14	"kyo-do?"	May 3, 2023	3	5	3	13	—	—	—	indigo hour
-	"Tokyo's Way!" (トーキョーズ・ウェイ!)	January 31, 2024	15	—	15	—	—	—	—	indigo hour
15	"School Days"	March 19, 2025	5	8	5	26	—	—	—	
16	"Ebi Buddy Love" (えび♡バディLOVE)	April 22, 2026	6	—	—	20	—	—	—	
"—" indicates that the release did not chart, or the specific chart did not exist at the time of release

^{*} Cover single
^{**} The song "Go! Go! Here We Go! Rock Lee" is an ending theme for the Naruto anime series "Rock Lee & His Ninja Pals" (Ep. 14 – 26).

=== Digital singles ===
Title	Release date	Charts						Album	Notes
Title	Release date	JP Oricon Streaming	JP Oricon Digital Singles	JP Oricon Singles	JP Billboard Hot 100	JP Billboard Streaming	JP Billboard Downloads	Album	Notes
"U.B.U."	September 25, 2013	—	—	—	—	—	—	Kinpachi (金八)	
"Tairyo Ebisu-bushi" (大漁恵比寿節)	January 1, 2015	—	—	—	—	—	—	Kinpachi (金八)	
"Hanseiki Yūtōsei" (半世紀優等生)	March 25, 2015	—	—	—	—	—	—	Non-Album Single	Released as 五五七二三二〇 (5572320)
"Eien ni Chūgakusei (Ebichu Mafuyu no Kitahan-Kyuristmas 2014 ver.)" (永遠に中学生(エビ中 真冬の北半キュリスマス2014 ver.))	April 1, 2015	—	—	—	—	—	—	Non-Album Single	Live Single
"Ponpara Pecorna Papiyotta" (ポンパラ ペコルナ パピヨッタ)	October 5, 2015	—	—	—	—	—	—	Anarchy (穴空, Anākī)	Released as 五五七二三二〇 (5572320)
"Haruyasumi Moratorium Chūgakusei" (春休みモラトリアム中学生)	February 5, 2016	—	—	—	—	—	—	Anarchy (穴空, Anākī)	
"Popcorn Tone" (ポップコーントーン)	March 4, 2016	—	—	—	—	—	—	Anarchy (穴空, Anākī)	
"Kitto Infinity!" (きっとインフィニティー！)	March 6, 2016	—	—	—	—	—	—	Non-Album Single	Released as インフィニティーズ (Infinities)
"Yonmi Ittai" (四味一体)	November 7, 2016	—	—	—	—	—	—	Non-Album Single	Released as 五五七二三二〇 (5572320)
"Nikki" (日記)	January 11, 2018 (Digital) November 3, 2018 (Live Limited CD)	—	47	—	—	—	48	Non-Album Single	B-sides are exclusive to the CD ver.
"Jiyū e Michizure" (自由へ道連れ)	May 23, 2018	—	—	—	—	—	55	Adam to Eve no Ringo (アダムとイヴの林檎; Ringo Sheena Tribute Album)	Ringo Sheena cover
"BUZZER BEATER"	December 29, 2018	—	—	—	—	—	—	MUSiC	
"Donten" (曇天)	January 30, 2019	—	—	—	—	—	60	MUSiC	
"Ashita mo Kitto 70-ten feat. Shinonome Megu" (明日もきっと70点 feat. 東雲めぐ)	February 28, 2019	—	—	—	—	—	—	MUSiC	
EBICHU After 6 Session mixed by CMJK（live at AFTER 6 JUNCTION）	January 27, 2020	—	—	—	—	—	—	Non-Album Single	Live single
"Earphone Riot" (イヤフォン・ライオット)	August 11, 2021	3	—	4	15	3	—	FAMIEN'21 L.P.	
"Nanairo – From The First Take" (なないろ)	September 24, 2021	—	—	—	—	—	—	Non-Album Single	Recorded live in the studio
"Jump – From The First Take" (with Huwie Ishizaki) (ジャンプ (with 石崎ひゅーい))	October 22, 2021	—	—	—	—	—	—	Non-Album Single	Recorded live in the studio
"Anytime, Anywhere"	November 26, 2021	—	—	—	—	—	95	Shiritsu Ebisu Chugaku (私立恵比寿中学)	
"Seishun Zombies" (青春ゾンビィィズ)	May 5, 2022	12	—	20	23	13	95	Chukichi (中吉)	
"Shin-Mirai Sensation" (新未来センセーション)	June 17, 2022	—	—	—	—	—	75	Chukichi (中吉)	
"Bang Bang Beat"	July 20, 2022	—	—	—	—	—	—	Chukichi (中吉)	
"Hello" (ヘロー)	August 24, 2022	—	—	—	83	52	—	Chukichi (中吉)	
"Mada x2 Uretai Emotion!" (まだ×2売れたいエモーション!)	October 26, 2022	—	—	—	—	88	—	Non-Album Single	
"Voyager" (ボイジャー)	December 7, 2022	—	—	—	100	75	—	Non-Album Single	Graduation song for Hinata Kashiwagi
"Summer Glitter"	July 28, 2023	—	—	—	—	86	—	FAMIEN'23 e.p.	
"BLUE DIZZINESS"	December 11, 2023	—	—	—	—	—	—	indigo hour	
"CRYSTAL DROP"	December 25, 2023	—	—	—	—	—	—	indigo hour	
"—" indicates that the release did not chart, or the specific chart did not exist at the time of release

==== Other charted songs ====
Title	Release date	Chart					Notes
Title	Release date	JP Oricon Streaming	JP Oricon Singles	JP Billboard Streaming	JP Billboard Hot 100	JP Billboard Downloads	Notes
"Eat the Oomedama" (イート・ザ・大目玉)	August 18, 2018	—	—	—	—	29	"FAMIEN'18 e.p." Song
"Anata no Dance de Sawagashii" (あなたのダンスで騒がしい)	May 18, 2019	—	—	—	—	56	"Trendy Girl" Single B-Side
"Musubareta Omoi" (結ばれた想い)	June 5, 2019	18	—	26	100	—	"Trendy Girl" Single B-Side
"23kai-me no Summer Night" (23回目のサマーナイト)	August 21, 2020	—	—	—	—	68	"FAMIEN'20 e.p." Song
"Happy End to Sorekara" (ハッピーエンドとそれから)	March 9, 2022	—	9	29	38	—	"Shiritsu Ebisu Chugaku (私立恵比寿中学)" Song

=== Vinyl singles ===
No.	Title	Release date	Album	Notes
1	"Tebura de Ski ~Seishun Liberty~" (テブラデスキー〜青春リバティ〜)	April 1, 2015	Kinpachi (金八)	Limited Production Release

=== Studio albums ===
No.	Title	Release date	Charts					
No.	Title	Release date	JP Oricon CD Albums	JP Oricon Albums	JP Oricon Download Albums	JP Billboard Top Albums	JP Billboard Hot Albums	JP Billboard Album Downloads
1	Chunin (中人)	July 24, 2013	7	—	—	7	—	—
2	Kinpachi (金八)	January 20, 2015	2	—	—	6	—	—
3	Anarchy (穴空)	April 20, 2016	2	—	—	2	2	11
4	Ebicracy (エビクラシー)	May 31, 2017	1	—	7	1	1	7
5	MUSiC	March 13, 2019	2	2	13	2	3	18
6	playlist	December 18, 2019	2	1	11	1	2	12
7	Shiritsu Ebisu Chugaku (私立恵比寿中学)	March 23, 2022	4	5	14	4	4	15
8	indigo hour	February 28, 2024	3	4	17	4	4	18
"—" indicates that the release did not chart, or the specific chart did not exist at the time of release

=== Compilation albums ===
No.	Title	Release date	Charts					
No.	Title	Release date	JP Oricon CD Albums	JP Oricon Albums	JP Oricon Download Albums	JP Billboard Top Albums	JP Billboard Hot Albums	JP Billboard Album Downloads
1	Ebichū no Zeppan Best: Owaranai Seishun (エビ中の絶盤ベスト～おわらない青春～)	November 21, 2012	19	—	—	18	—	—
2	"Chūsotsu": Ebichū no Ike Ike Best (「中卒」〜エビ中のイケイケベスト〜)	November 16, 2016	11	—	30	22	29	—
3	"Chūkara": Ebichū no Waku Waku Best (「中辛」〜エビ中のワクワクベスト〜)	November 16, 2016	12	—	31	24	32	—
—	"Chūsotsu" "Chūkara": Ebichū no Complete Best (「中卒」「中辛」～エビ中のコンプリートベスト～)	November 16, 2016	—	—	—	17	19	—
4	FAMIEN'21 L.P.	August 18, 2021	5	6	—	6	7	—
5	Chukichi (中吉)	September 21, 2022	7	7	22	7	7	29
"—" indicates that the release did not chart, or the specific chart did not exist at the time of release								

=== Live albums ===
No.	Title	Release date	Charts						Notes
No.	Title	Release date	JP Oricon CD Albums	JP Oricon Albums	JP Oricon Download Albums	JP Billboard Top Albums	JP Billboard Hot Albums	JP Billboard Album Downloads	Notes
1	Ebichū Akikaze to Suzumushi no Ongaku no Shirabe Daishite 'Chūon' 2017 (エビ中 秋風と鈴虫と音楽のしらべ 題して「ちゅうおん」2017)	December 23, 2017	—	—	—	—	—	—	Fanclub Only Release
2	FAMIEN'18 IN YAMANAKAKO DAY 1	October 20, 2018	—	—	9	—	46	8	Digital Only Release
3	FAMIEN'18 IN YAMANAKAKO DAY 2	October 20, 2018	—	—	11	—	49	10	Digital Only Release
4	Ebichū Akizora to Matsumushi to Ongaku no Tsudoi Daishite 'Chūon' 2018 (エビ中 秋空と松虫と音楽のつどい 題して「ちゅうおん」2018)	November 14, 2018	—	—	—	—	—	—	Fanclub Only Release
5	Band no Minna to Daigakugeikai 2019 Ebichū no Full Battery Surround (バンドのみんなと大学芸会2019 エビ中のフルバッテリー・サラウンド)	April 18, 2020	—	—	—	—	—	—	Limited Production Release
6	Ebichū Aki-urara to Suzumushi to Ongaku no Kodama Daishite 'Chūon' 2020 (エビ中 秋麗と轡虫と音楽のこだま 題して「ちゅうおん」2020)	November 25, 2020	16	17	—	14	18	—	
7	Ebichū Shūsei to Okera to Ongaku no Kagayaki Daishite 'Chūon' 2021 (エビ中 秋声と螻蛄と音楽の輝き 題して「ちゅうおん」2021)	December 22, 2021	11	12	—	9	12	—	
8	Daigakugeikai 2021 ~Reboot~ (大学芸会2021 ～Reboot～)	December 14, 2022	—	—	36	—	—	—	Digital Only Release
"—" indicates that the release did not chart, or was not released in that format

=== EPs ===
No.	Title	Release date	Charts		Notes
No.	Title	Release date	JP Oricon Download Albums	JP Oricon Albums	Notes
1	FAMIEN'15 e.p.	August 5, 2015	—	—	Digital Only Release
2	FAMIEN'16 e.p.	August 10, 2016	—	—	Digital Only Release
3	FAMIEN'17 e.p.	August 26, 2017	—	—	Digital Only Release
4	FAMIEN'18 e.p.	August 18, 2018	—	—	Digital Only Release
5	FAMIEN'20 e.p.	August 21, 2020	5	34	Digital Only Release
6	FAMIEN'23 e.p.	August 6, 2023	10	—	Digital Only Release
7	FAMIEN'24 e.p.	August 17, 2024	17	—	Digital Only Release
8	FAMIEN'25 e.p. ?! Korega Saikyo♡Kari-Keiyaku no Cinderella	June 1, 2025	18	—	Digital Only Release

=== Video releases ===
==== Concerts and documentaries ====
No.	Title	Release date	Charts	
No.	Title	Release date	Oricon Weekly DVD Chart	Oricon Weekly Blu-ray Chart
Indie				
1	Shiritsu Ebisu Chūgaku 1st One-man Live (私立恵比寿中学1stワンマンLIVE)	February 15, 2012	37	—
Major (Defstar Records)				
1	Defstar Wars Ebisode 1: Gakugeikai no Gyakushū (デフスターウォーズ EBISODE1 ~学芸会の逆襲~)	June 27, 2012	88	53
2	Shiritsu Ebisu Chūgaku First Concert "Jā Best Ten" (私立恵比寿中学 ファーストコンサート「じゃあ・ベストテン」)	November 21, 2012	70	29
3	Shiritsu Ebisu Chūgaku Toshiwasure Daigakugeikai 'Ebichu no Jungle Daibouken' (私立恵比寿中学年忘れ大学芸会「エビ中のジャングル大冒険」)	March 13, 2013	44	15
4	Shiritsu Ebisu Chūgaku 'Kuruizaki Eby Road ~Owarinaki Shinkyū~' (私立恵比寿中学「狂い咲きエビィーロード 〜終わりなき進級〜」)	July 24, 2013	56	29
5	Shiritsu Ebisu Chūgaku Spring Defstar Tonden Tour 2013 Document Movie 'Everything Point' (私立恵比寿中学 スプリングデフスターとんでんツアー2013 ドキュメントムービー「EVERYTHING POINT」)	September 25, 2013	96	45
6	Shiritsu Ebisu Chūgaku 'Ebichu Natsu no Family Ensoku Ryakushite Famien in Kawaguchiko 2013' (私立恵比寿中学「エビ中 夏のファミリー遠足 略してファミえん in 河口湖2013」)	December 4, 2013	64	11
7	Shiritsu Ebisu Chūgaku Toshiwasure Daigakugeikai 2013 'Ebichu no Star Conductor' (私立恵比寿中学 年忘れ大学芸会2013「エビ中のスター・コンダクター」)	March 5, 2014	22	9
8	Shiritsu Ebisu Chūgaku Gōdō Shuppatsushiki ~Ima, Kimi ga Koko ni iru~ (私立恵比寿中学合同出発式〜今、君がここにいる〜)	August 27, 2014	16	11
9	Shiritsu Ebisu Chūgaku Spring Sony Music Labels Rookie Tour 2014 Document Movie 'Everything Point 2' (私立恵比寿中学 スプリングソニー・ミュージックレーベルズルーキーツアー2014 ドキュメントムービー「EVERYTHING POINT2」)	September 24, 2014	61	33
10	Shiritsu Ebisu Chūgaku 'Ebichu Natsu no Family Ensoku Ryakushite Famien in Yamanakako 2014' (私立恵比寿中学「エビ中 夏のファミリー遠足 略してファミえん in 山中湖 2014」)	December 17, 2014	59	21
11	Shiritsu Ebisu Chūgaku Tōzai Daigakugeikai 2014 'Ebichu no Omocha Big Garage' (私立恵比寿中学 東西大学芸会2014「エビ中のおもちゃビッグガレージ」)	April 8, 2015	22	4
Major (SME Records)
12	Shiritsu Ebisu Chūgaku 'Ebichu Natsu no Family Ensoku Ryakushite Famien in Nagaoka 2015' (私立恵比寿中学 「エビ中 夏のファミリー遠足 略してファミえん in 長岡2015」)	December 9, 2015	—	39
13	Shiritsu Ebisu Chūgaku Tobidase Zen Jū Hall Tour 2015 Document Movie 'Everything Point 3' (私立恵比寿中学 飛び出せ全十ホールツアー2015 ドキュメントムービー「EVERYTHING POINT3」)	December 9, 2015	—	62
14	Shiritsu Ebisu Chūgaku Toshiwasure Daigakugeikai 2015 'Ebichu no All Attrac-Star' (私立恵比寿中学 年忘れ大学芸会2015「エビ中のオールアトラクスター」)	April 20, 2016	—	9
15	Shiritsu Ebisu Chūgaku 'Ebichu Natsu no Family Ensoku Ryakushite Famien in Fujikyu 2016' (私立恵比寿中学 エビ中夏のファミリー遠足略してファミえんin 富士急2016)	December 21, 2016	—	33
16	Shiritsu Ebisu Chūgaku 'Everything Point 4' (私立恵比寿中学 「EVERYTHING POINT 4」)	December 21, 2016	—	37
17	Shiritsu Ebisu Chūgaku Christmas Daigakugeikai 2016 'Ebichu no Ocean's Guide' (私立恵比寿中学 クリスマス大学芸会2016「エビ中のオーシャンズガイド」)	April 19, 2017	—	10
18	Shiritsu Ebisu Chūgaku 'Everything Point 5' (私立恵比寿中学 「EVERYTHING POINT 5」)	December 6, 2017	—	7
19	Shiritsu Ebisu Chūgaku 'Ebichu Natsu no Family Ensoku Ryakushite Famien in Moricoro Park 2017' (私立恵比寿中学 エビ中 夏のファミリー遠足 略してファミえん in モリコロパーク 2017)	January 3, 2018	—	3
20	Shiritsu Ebisu Chūgaku Daigakugeikai 2018 in Nippon Budokan (私立恵比寿中学 大学芸会2018 in 日本武道館)	April 18, 2018	—	4
21	Koko Kara (ここから)	December 19, 2018	—	22
22	Ebichu Natsu no Family Ensoku Ryakushite Famien Reiwa Gannen in Yamanakako (エビ中 夏のファミリー遠足 略してファミえん 令和元年 in 山中湖)	August 5, 2020	—	5
23	Band no Minna to Daigakugeikai 2019 Ebichū no Full Battery Surround (バンドのみんなと大学芸会2019 エビ中のフルバッテリー・サラウンド)	December 16, 2020	—	6
24	Ebichu Natsu no Family Ensoku Ryakushite Famien in Yamanakako 2022 (エビ中 夏のファミリー遠足 略してファミえん in 山中湖 2022)	December 14, 2022	—	11
25	Shiritsu Ebisu Chugaku "Kashiwagi Hinata Sotsugyoushiki & New Style Daigakugeikai (私立恵比寿中学「柏木ひなた卒業式 & New style 大学芸会」)	March 29, 2023	—	10
26	Ebichu Natsu no Family Ensoku Ryakushite Famien in Yamanakako 2023 (エビ中 夏のファミリー遠足 略してファミえん in 山中湖 2023)	December 20, 2023	—	—
27	Shiritsu Ebisu Chugaku Shinshun Daigakugeikai 2024 ~Takaku Tobu Ryu to Bokura no Sono Saki~ (私立恵比寿中学 新春大学芸会2024 ～高く飛ぶ竜と僕らのその先～)	July 3, 2024	—	12
"—" indicates that the release did not chart, or was not released in that format

==== Compilations ====
No.	Title	Release date	Charts
No.	Title	Release date	Oricon Weekly Blu-ray Chart
Major (Defstar Records)
1	Best Hit EBC (ベストヒットEBC)	June 17, 2015	7

==== Theater ====
No.	Title	Release date	Charts
No.	Title	Release date	Oricon Weekly Blu-ray Chart
1	Extra Shot Non-Whipped Caramel Pudding Macchiato (エクストラショットノンホイップキャラメルプディングマキアート)	July 31, 2015	15
2	Girls' Business Satellite (ガールズビジネスサテライト)	August 31, 2016	11
3	Boku-Cone ~ Boku wa Techno-cut yori Connecticut (ボクコネ～ぼくはテクノカットよりコネチカット)	June 12, 2020	23
4	My Sweet Little Lucky Day (マイスイートリトルラッキーデイ)	October 2, 2024	-

==== TV drama shows ====
No.	Title	Release date	Charts		Notes
No.	Title	Release date	Oricon Weekly DVD Chart	Oricon Weekly Blu-ray Chart	Notes
1	Kōkaku Fudō Senki Robosan (甲殻不動戦記 ロボサン)	February 20, 2015	58	28	Box set (5DVD or 5BD)
2	Kimi wa Houkago, Sora wo Tobu (君は放課後、宙を飛ぶ)	November 2, 2018	142	39	Box set (2DVD or 2BD)
3	Kami Tunes ~Narase! DTM Joshi~ (神ちゅーんず 〜鳴らせ!DTM女子〜)	November 1, 2019	—	42	Box set (2BD)
"—" indicates that the release did not chart, or was not released in that format

==== TV variety shows ====
Ebichū no Eien ni Chūgakusei (Kari) (エビ中の永遠に中学生 (仮); Ebichu's "Middle School Students Forever (Preliminary Title)")

- Limited-press box set (6DVD or 6BD) - December 12, 2012

Ebichū no Eien ni Chūgakusei (Kari) 2 (エビ中の永遠に中学生 (仮) 2; Ebichu's "Middle School Students Forever (Preliminary Title) 2")

- Limited-press box set (6DVD or 6BD) - February 12, 2014

Ebichū Land! (エビ中らんどっ!)

- Vol.1 (DVD or BD) - September 27, 2013
- Vol.2 (DVD or BD) - November 29, 2013
- Vol.3 (DVD or BD) - January 31, 2014
- Vol.4 (DVD or BD) - March 28, 2014

Ebichū☆Global ka Keikaku (エビ中☆グローバル化計画; Ebichu Globalization Project)

- Vol.1 (DVD or BD) - June 25, 2014
- Vol.2 (DVD or BD) - July 30, 2014
- Vol.3 (DVD or BD) - August 27, 2014
- Vol.4 (DVD or BD) - September 24, 2014
- Vol.5 (DVD or BD) - October 22, 2014
- Vol.6 (DVD or BD) - November 19, 2014
- Vol.7 (DVD or BD) - December 17, 2014

Ebichū Hi Land! (エビ中Hiらんどっ!)

- Director's Cut Vol.1 (DVD or BD) - September 12, 2014
- Director's Cut Vol.2 (DVD or BD) - November 21, 2014
- Director's Cut Vol.3 (DVD or BD) - January 23, 2015
- Director's Cut Vol.4 (DVD or BD) - March 20, 2015
- Director's Cut Vol.5 (DVD or BD) - April 17, 2015

Ebichū no Tensai Bonsai Chūgakusei (Kari) (エビ中の天才盆栽中学生(仮); Ebichu's "Genius Bonsai Middle School Students (Preliminary Title)")

- Box set (2DVD or 2BD) - September 26, 2014

Ebichū Island!!! (エビ中島！！！)

- Director's Cut Vol.1 (DVD or BD) - November 27, 2015
- Director's Cut Vol.2 (DVD or BD) - November 27, 2015
- Director's Cut Vol.3 (DVD or BD) - November 27, 2015
- Director's Cut Vol.4 (DVD or BD) - May 27, 2016
- Director's Cut Vol.5 (DVD or BD) - May 27, 2016
- Director's Cut Vol.6 (DVD or BD) - May 27, 2016

Ebichū (Space) !!!! (エビ宙！！！！)

- Director's Cut Vol.1 (DVD or BD) - July 22, 2016
- Director's Cut Vol.2 (DVD or BD) - September 23, 2016
- Director's Cut Vol.3 (DVD or BD) - November 25, 2016

=== Music videos ===
Title	Release date	Director
"The Tissue ~Tomaranai Seishun~"	15 April 2011	Hideaki "Yeti" Ieizumi
"Oh My Ghost? ~Watashi ga Akuryō ni Natte mo~"	17 July 2011	Hideaki "Yeti" Ieizumi
"Motto Hashire!!"	2 October 2011	Hideaki "Yeti" Ieizumi
"Karikeiyaku no Cinderella"	4 April 2012	Hideaki Iezumi
"Hōkago Getabako Rock 'n' Roll MX"	11 April 2012	Masakazu Fukatsu
"Go! Go! Here We Go! Rock Lee"	11 July 2012	Hideaki Fukui
"Otona wa Wakatte Kurenai"	6 August 2012	Kanji Sutō
"Ganbatteru Tochū"	27 November 2012	unknown
"Ume"	14 January 2013	Toshitaka Shinoda
"Kindan no Karma"	22 April 2013	Tsuchiya Takatoshi
"Te wo Tsunagō"	21 May 2013	Satoshi Tani
"U.B.U"	20 October 2013	Ebichū no Eien ni Chūgakusei (Kari) 2 production team
"Mikakunin Chūgakusei X"	10 November 2013	Tsutomu Sekine
"Butterfly Effect"	13 May 2014	Ikioi
"Haitateki"	30 September 2014	Ikioi
"Hanseiki Yutōsei" (5572320 song)	18 March 2015	
"Natsu daze Johnny"	28 June 2015	Wataru Saito / Hideaki Fukui
"Superhero"	1 October 2015	Jumpei Watanabe / Akiko Takamatsu
"Ponpara Pecorna Papiyotta" (5572320 song)	4 October 2015	Sojiro Kagiya
"Zettē Anarchy"	17 March 2016	Jumpei Watanabe
"Nikibi"	10 April 2016	Toshitaka Shinoda
"Massugu"	20 August 2016	Jumpei Watanabe / Tatsuyuki Kobayashi
"Yonmi Ittai" (5572320 song)	6 November 2016	
"Sudden Death"	15 November 2016	Taiiku Okazaki
"Real Aru Aru Ganbatteru Tochū" (with Razor Ramon RG)	28 November 2016	
"Ebinegi Alright!" (with Negicco)	30 December 2016	
"Kanjo Densha"	4 May 2017	Toshitaka Shinoda
"Nanairo"	20 May 2017	Satoshi Tani
"YELL"	6 August 2017	Ryohei Osumi
"Sing Along, Sing A Song"	1 November 2017	Hidenobu Tanabe
"Hibiki"	4 January 2018	
"Dekadonden"	30 May 2018	ZUMI
"Sweetest Tabou."	19 June 2018	Shiritsu Ebisu Chugaku
"Jukujo ni Nattemo (feat. SUSHIBOYS)"	17 August 2018	SUSHIBOYS
"Baby Ebinegi Pop!" (with Negicco)	21 January 2019	
"Genki Shika nai!"	11 March 2019	Kazuki Wada
"Ashita mo Kitto 70ten (feat. Megu Shinonome)"	12 March 2019	Toshitaka Shinoda
"Donten"	13 March 2019	Tomoko Oshima (Illustrator)
"BUZZER BEATER"	14 March 2019	Jumpei Watanabe / Tomoyuki Kujirai
"Ume (Reiwa ver.)"	1 May 2019	Toshitaka Shinoda
"Trendy Girl"	17 May 2019	Go Inagaki
"Jump"	3 December 2019	Kazuma Ikeda
"Sweet of Sweet ~Kimi ni Todoku made~"	21 March 2020	Kazuma Ikeda
"23kai-me no Summer Night"	5 August 2020	Shiritsu Ebisu Chugaku
"Earphone Riot"	18 August 2021	Takuya Tada
"summer dejavu (Riko Nakayama Seitan ver.)"	12 October 2021	Takuya Otaki
"Happy End to Sorekara"	9 March 2022	Yu Matsunaga
"Seishun Zombiies"	31 May 2022	Yu Matsunaga & Shintaro Yoda
"Sugar Glaze"	10 August 2022	Toshitaka Shinoda
"Hello"	25 August 2022	Yu Matsunaga
"Voyager"	7 December 2022	Hideo Kawai
"kyo-do?"	13 April 2023	Seito Nakajima
"BLUE DIZZINESS"	11 December 2023	Riku Ozama
"CRYSTAL DROP"	25 December 2023	Riku Ozama
"TWINKLE WINK"	19 February 2024	Riku Ozama
"SCHOOL DAYS"	24 February 2025	Mai
