= Apartment 1303 =

- Theatrical release poster
- Directed by: Ataru Oikawa
- Written by: Ataru Oikawa; Kei Ōishi; Takamasa Sato
- Produced by: Chiaki Harada
- Starring: Noriko Nakagoshi; Yuka Itaya; Arata Furuta
- Cinematography: Tokusho Kikumura
- Edited by: Shuichi Kakesu
- Music by: John Lissauer; Masako Miyoshi
- Production companies: Amuse; Career & Bridge; T.O. Entertainment
- Distributed by: MonteCristo International
- Release date: 8 February 2007 (Japan)
- Running time: 94 minutes
- Countries: Japan; United States
- Language: Japanese
- Box office: $726,960

Apartment 1303 (Japanese: 1303号室) is a 2007 Japanese horror film, directed by Ataru Oikawa, that revolves around a woman who investigates a series of suicides in her late sister's apartment. Based on Ju-on horror author Kei Ōishi's original novel.

== Plot ==
Living on her own for the first time, Sayaka Midorikawa celebrates with her friends at her new 13th-floor apartment. During the party, she is seen acting strange before jumping to her death from her balcony. A little girl picks up a teddy bear lying near Sayaka's body and says: "There goes another one."

At Sayaka's funeral, her older sister Mariko sees the ghost of Sayaka, who whispers: "Mom pushed me." Their mother, San, deeply devastated by Sayaka's death, seems to be falling into a world of insanity, which worries Mariko. At Sayaka's apartment, a little girl appears from next door and informs Mariko that all women who lived in #1303 have died.

While Mariko clears out the apartment, she repeatedly catches sight of Sayaka. She then comes across an earring that looked as if it had been ripped out of someone's earlobe. Mariko wonders if this might be a clue. She meets a police detective, Sakurai, who reveals that he has been investigating a series of suicides at #1303 and he does not believe it is a coincidence. Mariko gives him the blood-streaked earring, believing it belongs to a previous tenant.

Mariko soon comes across a book about the first two tenants who lived in #1303: Yukiyo Sugiuchi and her mother. The mother became abusive towards Yukiyo for hiding food and having her ears pierced, which prompts her to rip the earring out of Yukiyo's earlobe. Yukiyo reacts defensively to her mother's violence with a butcher knife, then watches while her mother crawls into a closet, where she bleeds to death. Six months later, the landlord reveals his plans to have Yukiyo and mother thrown out for failing to pay rent.

Upset and afraid, Yukiyo sees the ghost of her mother, who has been tormenting Yukiyo since her death. Yukiyo picks up a teddy bear, walks to her balcony and jumps to her death. Mariko discovers that since Yukiyo's death, the next four tenants – with Sayaka as the latest – had moved into #1303 and eventually jumped to their death. The police ruled each case as a suicide.

Mariko learns her mother plans to visit #1303 to see Sayaka one more time and rushes to save her. Unknown to Mariko, the apartment has been rented out to several college students, who throw a party that night. During the party, Yukiyo pushes girls over the balcony. Mariko arrives and rushes to #1303. Yukiyo appears and Mariko accuses her of killing the previous tenants but Yukiyo denies this, revealing that her mother is the one who told her to throw them over because they were evil. Mariko returns Yukiyo's earring to her while promising to look after #1303. The spirit seems to accept this and vanishes.

As Mariko awakens the following morning, Yukiyo pushes Mariko against the balcony and tells her that her mother has only one daughter. Mariko notices Sayaka watching just as she falls to her death. Standing next to her mother, the little girl says: "There goes another one." Then she and her mother vanish.

== Cast ==
- Noriko Nakagoshi as Mariko Midorikawa
- Arata Furuta as Detective Sakurai
- Eriko Hatsune as Yukiyo Sugiuchi
- Aki Fukada as Sayaka Midorikawa
- Yuka Itaya as Neighbor next door
- Naoko Otani as San Midorikawa
- Toshinobu Matsuo as Kenichiro Itawa
- Shion Machida as Mrs. Sugiuchi, Yukiyo's mother
- Rina Matsuno

== Production ==
Apartment 1303 was filmed in the Japanese Hamamatsu City, Shizuoka Prefecture.

== Release ==
The film premiered on 7 February 2007, as part of the European Film Market in Germany.

== Remake ==
The film was remade as an American/Canadian, English language co-production in late 2011/2012. It was set to be written, directed and co-produced by Swedish filmmaker Daniel Fridell, however the film was directed and co-written by Michael Taverna, who co-produced with Cindy Nelson-Mullen. Ken Ôishi was also credited as a writer. Mischa Barton, Rebecca De Mornay and Julianne Michelle were cast in the production's lead roles. It was released in December 2012 and across early 2013 internationally, with a release in the United States on 25 July 2013. Apartment 1303 3D was universally panned by critics. On the review aggregator website Rotten Tomatoes, the film holds an approval rating of 8% based on reviews from critics.

=== Differences between the Japanese Version and the American Remake ===
- Sayaka is killed by an unseen force with only a little girl watching the whole thing. In the American Remake, there's no witness for Janet's suicide.
- Mariko and their mother, San, attends Sayaka's funeral. In the American Remake, there's no mention of a funeral.
- San is deeply affected by the death of Sayaka, while in the American Remake, Maddie doesn't show the same concerns for Janet and Lara. It's heavily implied that she was very abusive to them
- Mariko gets a warning from Sayaka's ghostly form to leave Apartment 1303 immediately. In the American Remake, Lara only gets the warning during her bubble bath from Janet to leave. However, she eventually ignores it after another fight with Maddie.
- Unlike in the American Remake, Sakurai is more sympathetic to Mariko's plight as he has been investigating the mysterious suicides.
- In the Japanese film, Mariko learns of Apartment 1303's first tenants: the Sugichis, from a book she got from Sakurai. In the American remake, Lara learns of the Logans by the detective investigating the case.
- The Japanese film detailed the abusive nature of Yukiyo's mother, Shion, towards Yukiyo that lead to the mysterious suicides caused by Yukiyo killing Shion and her eventual suicide. In the American remake, its mentioned about Mary's abusive nature to Jennifer, but no flashbacks followed.
- Unlike the Japanese film which has Yukiyo murdering the tenants at the orders of Shion, the American remake implies that Jennifer is a villain who murders anyone.
- In the American remake as Lara is trying to escape from the apartment complex, she is confronted O'Neal who turns out to be Emily's father and they reveal their fate at the hands of Jennifer. In the Japanese film, the little girl is revealed to be a younger version of Yukiyo and she is last seen with Shion.
- In the Japanese film's ending, Mariko suffers the same fate as the previous tenants and is pushed to her death by Yukiyo at the orders of Shion. In the American remake, Jennifer never finished her job to kill Lara like her previous victims. She is instead arrested for the murders and Jennifer is seen sitting on the balcony where she committed suicide.

== See also ==
- List of ghost films
