= Natsudaze Johnny =

Single by Shiritsu Ebisu Chugaku

from the album Anarchy
- A-side: "Natsudaze Johnny"
- B-side: "Candy Lock Girl" (Regular Ed.); "Nōshō Sakuretsu Girl" (Lim. Tour-venue Ed.); "Ginyūshijin" (Lim. Online Ed.)
- Released: June 17, 2015 (Japan)
- Genre: J-pop
- Label: Defstar Records

Shiritsu Ebisu Chugaku singles chronology
| "Haitateki!" (2014) | "Natsudaze Johnny" (2015) | "Super Hero" (2015) |

Music video
- "Natsudaze Johnny" (VEVO) "Natsudaze Johnny" (SMEJ) on YouTube

"Natsu Da ze Johnny" (夏だぜジョニー; "It's Summer, Johnny!", stylized on the cover as "Natsudaze Johnny") is the 8th major-label single by the Japanese girl idol group Shiritsu Ebisu Chugaku. It was released in Japan on June 17, 2015, on the label Defstar Records.

== Release details ==
The CD single was released in three versions: a "regular edition" and two limited editions: a "Tour-venue Edition" (for sale only at concerts), and an "Online (ForTune Music) Edition" (for sale only online at ForTune Music). The differences between the editions are the cover art and the B-sides.

== Reception ==
The physical CD single debuted at number 2 in the Oricon daily singles chart. In the Oricon weekly singles chart, it debuted also at number 2.

== Track listing ==
=== Regular Edition ===
CD
| No. | Title | Length |
|---|---|---|
| 1. | "Natsudaze Johnny" (ありがとう～無限のエール～, "It's summer, Johnny!") |
| 2. | "Candy Lock Girl" (キャンディロッガー) |
| 3. | "Natsudaze Johnny (Less Vocal)" |
| 4. | "Candy Lock Girl (Less Vocal)" |

=== Limited Tour-venue Edition ===
CD
| No. | Title | Length |
|---|---|---|
| 1. | "Natsudaze Johnny" |
| 2. | "Nōshō Sakuretsu Girl" (脳漿炸裂ガール, "Brain Fluid Explosion Girl") |
| 3. | "Natsudaze Johnny (Less Vocal)" |
| 4. | "Nōshō Sakuretsu Girl (Less Vocal)" |

=== Limited Online (ForTune Music) Edition ===
CD
| No. | Title | Length |
|---|---|---|
| 1. | "Natsudaze Johnny" |
| 2. | "Ginyūshijin" (吟遊詩人, "Minstrel") |
| 3. | "Natsudaze Johnny (Less Vocal)" |
| 4. | "Nōshō Sakuretsu Girl (Less Vocal)" |

== Charts ==
| Chart (2015) | Peak position |
|---|---|
| Oricon Daily Singles Chart | 2 |
| Oricon Weekly Singles Chart | 2 |
| Oricon Monthly Singles Chart | 5 |
