= Butterfly Effect (Shiritsu Ebisu Chugaku song) =

- Limited Anime Edition cover

Single by Shiritsu Ebisu Chugaku

from the album Kinpachi
- Released: June 4, 2014 (Japan)
- Recorded: 2014
- Genre: J-pop, pop
- Label: Defstar Records

Shiritsu Ebisu Chugaku singles chronology
| "Mikakunin Chūgakusei X" (2013) | "Butterfly Effect" (2014) | "Haitateki!" (2014) |

Music videos
- "Butterfly Effect"(VEVO) on YouTube
- "Butterfly Effect"(SMEJ) on YouTube

"Butterfly Effect" (バタフライエフェクト) is the 6th major single by the Japanese girl idol group Shiritsu Ebisu Chugaku. It was released in Japan on June 4, 2014, on the label Defstar Records. The song was used as the opening theme for the 2014 anime series Nanana's Buried Treasure.

== Release details ==
The single was released in three versions: the Limited Anime Edition, the Limited Yodel Edition, and the Regular Edition. The Limited Anime Edition includes a DVD with the music video for the title track, while the other two editions are CD-only.

== Track listing ==
=== Limited Anime Edition ===
| No. | Title | Length |
|---|---|---|
| 1. | "Butterfly Effect" (バタフライエフェクト) |
| 2. | "Encore no Koi" (アンコールの恋) |
| 3. | "Butterfly Effect (Anime Size ver.)" (バタフライエフェクト (アニメサイズver.)) |
| 4. | "Butterfly Effect (Less Vocal ver.)" |
| 5. | "Encore no Koi (Less Vocal ver.)" |

DVD
| No. | Title | Length |
|---|---|---|
| 1. | "Butterfly Effect" (Music video) |
| 2. | "Credits-free opening sequence of Nanana's Buried Treasure" (『龍ヶ嬢七々々の埋蔵金』 ノンクレジットオープニング映像) |

=== Limited Yodel Edition ===
| No. | Title | Length |
|---|---|---|
| 1. | "Butterfly Effect" |
| 2. | "Encore no Koi" |
| 3. | "Shiawase no Harigami wa Itsumo Senaka ni" (幸せの貼り紙はいつも背中に) |
| 4. | "Butterfly Effect (Less Vocal ver.)" |
| 5. | "Encore no Koi (Less Vocal ver.)" |
| 6. | "Shiawase no Harigami wa Itsumo Senaka ni (Less Vocal ver.)" (幸せの貼り紙はいつも背中に (Less Vocal ver.)) |

=== Regular Edition ===
| No. | Title | Length |
|---|---|---|
| 1. | "Butterfly Effect" |
| 2. | "Encore no Koi" |
| 4. | "Butterfly Effect (Less Vocal ver.)" |
| 5. | "Encore no Koi (Less Vocal ver.)" |
| 6. | "Lovely Smiley Baby" (ラブリースマイリーベイビー) |

== Charts ==
| Chart (2014) | Peak position |
|---|---|
| Oricon Daily Singles Chart | 1 |
| Oricon Weekly Singles Chart | 3 |
