= Kinpachi =

Studio album by Shiritsu Ebisu Chugaku
- Released: January 28, 2015 (Japan)
- Genre: J-pop, pop, rock
- Label: Defstar Records

Shiritsu Ebisu Chugaku chronology
Chunin (2013)	Kinpachi (2015)	Anarchy (2016)

Singles from Kinpachi
- 1. "Mikakunin Chūgakusei X" Released: November 20, 2013; 2. "Butterfly Effect" Released: June 4, 2014; 3. "Haitateki!" Released: November 5, 2014

Professional ratings
Review scores
Source	Rating
Billboard Japan	Favorable

Kinpachi (金八; "Golden Eight") is the second studio album by the Japanese girl idol group Shiritsu Ebisu Chugaku. The album is set for release on January 28, 2015 on the Sony Music Entertainment Japan's label Defstar Records.

== Background ==
The album will be released in 2 versions: a regular edition (CD only) and a limited edition (CD+Blu-ray). The limited edition and the first press of the regular version will include a trading card (randomly selected from a set of 8 that includes a card for each member) as a bonus.

== Track listing ==
=== CD ===
No.	Title	Length
1.	"Shiritsu Ebisu Chūgaku no Nichijō (Prologue) / Jijō no Jijō" (私立恵比寿中学の日常（Prologue）：二乗の事情)
2.	"Kinpachi Dance Music" (金八DANCE MUSIC)
3.	"Mikakunin Chūgakusei X (Kinpachi ver.)" (未確認中学生X（金八ver.）)
4.	"Teburadeski (Seishun Liberty)" (テブラデスキー～青春リバティ～)
5.	"King of Gakugeikai no Theme (Nu Skool Teenage Riot)" (キングオブ学芸会のテーマ～Nu Skool Teenage Riot～)
6.	"Shiritsu Ebisu Chūgaku no Nichijō (Interlude) / Hayaben Rap" (私立恵比寿中学の日常（Interlude）：早弁ラップ)
7.	"Butterfly Effect" (バタフライエフェクト)
8.	"Chichinpui" (ちちんぷい)
9.	"U.B.U. (Kinpachi ver.)" (U.B.U.（金八ver.）)
10.	"Fuyukoi" (フユコイ)
11.	"Playback" (PLAYBACK)
12.	"Shiawase no Harigami wa Itsumo Senaka ni" (幸せの貼り紙はいつも背中に)
13.	"Haitateki!" (ハイタテキ！)
14.	"Tairyō Ebisu Bushi" (大漁恵比寿節)
15.	"Kaimono Shiyouto Machida e" (買い物しようと町田へ)
16.	"Hotaru no Hikari (Demo)" (私立恵比寿中学の日常（Epilogue）：蛍の光（Demo）)

=== Blu-ray Disc (limited edition only) ===
(A B-sides-only performance by the 8-member lineup, for the first time on video)

Live footage from "Ebimani Vol. 1 Gyakushū no Hosare-kyoku" at Maihama Amphitheatre (October 19, 2014)
No.	Title	Length
1.	"Ebiture" (ebiture)
2.	"Diving" (ダイビング)
3.	"Kekka All Right" (結果オーライ)
4.	"Utae! Odore! Ebī Dada" (歌え！踊れ！エビーダダ！」)
5.	"Pakuchī" (パクチー)
6.	"Another Day" (Another Day)
7.	"Daisuki Da yo" (大好きだよ)
8.	"Shin Seishun Sonomono" (新・青春そのもの)
9.	"Yakusoku" (約束)
10.	"Mata Ashita" (また明日)

== Charts ==
Chart (2015)	Peak position
Oricon Weekly Albums Chart	2
