= Haitateki! =

- cover of the Limited Edition A

Single by Shiritsu Ebisu Chugaku

from the album Kinpachi
- B-side: "Namida wa Niawanai" (all editions); "I Can't Stop the Loneliness" (Limited Bī ed.); "Chupacabra" (Limited Chū ed.)
- Released: November 5, 2014 (Japan)
- Genre: J-pop; pop
- Label: Defstar Records

Shiritsu Ebisu Chugaku singles chronology
"Butterfly Effect" (2014)	"Haitateki!" (2014)	"Natsudaze Johnny" (2015)

Music video
- "Haitateki" (VEVO) on YouTube
- "Haitateki" (SMEJ) on YouTube

Professional ratings
Review scores
Source	Rating
CDJournal	Favorable

"Haitateki!" (ハイタテキ!) is the 7th major single by the Japanese girl idol group Shiritsu Ebisu Chugaku. It was released in Japan on November 5, 2014 on the label Defstar Records.

== Release details ==
The single was released in three versions: two limited pressings named "Limited Ē Edition" and "Limited Bī Edition" and a regular edition named "Chū Edition". The Limited Ē Edition includes a DVD with the music video for the title track, but it has only two songs on the CD, while the other editions are CD-only but have three.

== Track listing ==
=== Limited Ē Edition ===
CD
No.	Title	Length
1.	"Haitateki!" (ハイタテキ!)
2.	"Namida wa Niawanai" (涙は似合わない)
3.	"Haitateki! (Less Vocal ver.)"
4.	"Namida wa Niawanai (Less Vocal ver.)"

DVD
No.	Title	Length
1.	"Haitateki!" (Music video)
2.	"Bonus feature" (特典映像)

=== Limited Bī Edition ===
CD
No.	Title	Length
1.	"Haitateki!"
2.	"Namida wa Niawanai"
3.	"I Can't Stop the Loneliness" (I can't stop the loneliness)
4.	"Haitateki! (Less Vocal ver.)"
5.	"Namida wa Niawanai (Less Vocal ver.)"
6.	"I Can't Stop the Loneliness (Less Vocal ver.)"

=== Chū Edition (Regular Edition) ===
CD
No.	Title	Length
1.	"Haitateki!"
2.	"Namida wa Niawanai"
3.	"Chupacabra" (チュパカブラ)
4.	"Haitateki! (Less Vocal ver.)"
5.	"Namida wa Niawanai (Less Vocal ver.)"
6.	"Chupacabra (Less Vocal ver.)"

== Charts ==
Chart (2014)	Peak position
Oricon Daily Singles Chart	1
Oricon Weekly Singles Chart	3
