= Rina Matsuno =

Rina Matsuno 松野 莉奈

Background information
- Born: 16 July 1998; Tokyo, Japan
- Died: 8 February 2017 (aged 18) Tokyo, Japan
- Occupations: Singer; model; actress
- Years active: 2006–2017
- Formerly of: Mini Cheer Bears (2009–2010); Shiritsu Ebisu Chugaku (2010–2017)

Rina Matsuno (松野 莉奈, Matsuno Rina; 16 July 1998 – 8 February 2017) was a Japanese singer, model, actress, and tarento who was a member of the idol group Shiritsu Ebisu Chugaku.

== Career ==
Matsuno was scouted into the entertainment industry in Tokyo in Omotesandō Avenue when she was in the first grade of elementary school. She started as an actress in 2006 in Shimokita Series and later in the same year in Yakusha Damishii. In 2007 came her big screen debut in the movie Apartment 1303. Another movie, Tōdai, followed in 2008. In 2009–2010, she was in her agency Stardust Promotion's cheerleader-themed idol group Mini Cheer Bears.

In February 2010, she joined the girl idol group Shiritsu Ebisu Chugaku. In May 2012, she debuted with the group on a major record label. Matsuno's Shiritsu Ebisu Chugaku "attendance number" (a number assigned to all members in the group) was nine and her "image colour" was blue.

In 2013, she starred in the horror movie The Joker Game: Escape alongside fellow Shiritsu Ebisu Chugaku member Hirono Suzuki (who played the main protagonist). She was also a model for Larme, a Japanese fashion magazine for women.

== Illness and death ==
She died on 8 February 2017 at the age of 18. Matsuno was unable to perform at her group's concert the day before due to a health issue and was taking medical treatment at home in Tokyo. On February 8, early morning, her condition suddenly worsened. At around 5 am, her parents called the emergency services. She was pronounced dead at the hospital. It is presumed that she died from an illness. In her last post on Instagram on February 6, she said that she had returned from a family trip to Hakone.

Sankei Sports reported on February 10 that according to Rina Matsuno's agency (Stardust Promotion), "lethal arrhythmia" is suspected as the cause of her death. All upcoming concerts and events were cancelled, and the group went into a period of mourning with the farewell event being held on February 25.

== Musical groups ==
- Mini Cheer Bears (2009–2010)
- Shiritsu Ebisu Chugaku (2010–2017)

== Filmography ==
=== Films ===
Year	Title	Role	Source
2007	Apartment 1303		
2008	Tōdai		
2013	The Joker Game: Escape	Noriko Shimamoto	

=== TV series ===
- 2014: Kōkaku Fudōsenki Robosan — a miniseries (11 episodes) starring all the members of Shiritsu Ebisu Chugaku

=== Advertisements ===
Year	Title
2006	McDonald's Happy Meal
2006	Sumitomo Life "Yotsuba no Clover"
2007	Mitsubishi Delica
2007	Misawa Home
2007	Viera

=== Magazines ===
Year	Title	Notes	Ref.
2013	Soen		
2015	Larme	Regular model	
2015	Rola	Shiritsu Ebisu Chugaku Rina Matsuno no "Mitame wa Otona Nakami wa Kodomo"	
	Ebi Collection	Vol. 8, 13, 25	

=== Others ===
Title
Noriyuki Makihara feat. Kuro from Home Made Kazoku "Honno Sukoshidake" music video
OCN Today Kyō no Bishōjo Shashin Vol. 54
Mitsukoshi Isetan Strawberry Style Book 2015
