= Aika Hirota =

Aika Hirota 廣田 あいか
- Also known as: Ai-Ai
- Born: 31 January 1999 (age 27); Saitama Prefecture, Japan
- Genres: J-pop
- Occupations: singer; actress; voice actress; YouTuber
- Years active: 2005–present
- Labels: Defstar Records, UUUM RECORDS
- Formerly of: Shiritsu Ebisu Chugaku (2010–2018)

Aika Hirota (廣田 あいか, Hirota Aika; born 31 January 1999) is a Japanese YouTuber, singer and former member of the idol group Shiritsu Ebisu Chugaku. She was active with the group from April 10, 2010, to January 3, 2018.

== Discography ==
Also See Shiritsu Ebisu Chugaku Discography.

=== Singles ===
1. aiai to Iku, Nihon Zenkoku Tetsudou no Tabi (2015)
2. Suki ni Erabeba Iijan (2019)

=== EP's ===
1. Fuyu Kurinaba Haru Tookaraji. (2020)

== Filmography ==
=== Film ===
- Tamako-chan and Kokkubō (たまこちゃんとコックボー) (2015), Hiyoko Hoshino
- Sōon (騒音) (2015)
- Saki (咲-Saki-) (2017)
- After the Rain (恋は雨上がりのように) (2018)

=== Voice acting ===
- Tamako-chan and Kokkubō (たまこちゃんとコックボー) (Unikyara Project MoguP) Hiroshima Home TV
