= Hinata Kashiwagi =

Japanese singer and actor

Hinata Kashiwagi 柏木 ひなた
- Born: March 29, 1999 (age 27); Chiba Prefecture, Japan
- Genres: J-pop, Rock
- Occupations: singer; actress
- Instrument: Vocals
- Years active: 2010–present
- Labels: Defstar Records; SME Records
- Formerly of: Shiritsu Ebisu Chugaku (2010–2022)

Hinata Kashiwagi (柏木 ひなた, Kashiwagi Hinata; born March 29, 1999) is a Japanese singer, and a former member of the female idol group Shiritsu Ebisu Chugaku.

== Discography ==
=== Albums ===
1. 1/24 (Released March 27, 2024)
2. Saion (Release scheduled for March 25, 2026)

=== EP's ===
1. Kokokara. (Released July 12, 2023)
2. piece of me (Released December 6, 2023)

=== Singles ===
1. From Bow To Toe (Released June 28, 2023)
2. Santa Santa Santa (Released November 15, 2023)
3. Unhappy Sky (Released April 24, 2024)
4. Watashi (Released July 31, 2024)
5. Alca (Released November 13, 2024)
6. Daisuki de Daikirai / Shall we dance (Released August 27, 2025)
7. BBB (Released January 28, 2026)

== Filmography ==
=== TV dramas ===
- Vampire Heaven (2013, TV Tokyo) — Episodes 2, 6
- Saturday Drama 24 (土曜ドラマ24) Sennyū Keiji Idol — Deka Dance (潜入捜査アイドル・刑事ダンス) (October 29, 2016, TV Tokyo)
- Village Vanguard! (2019, TV Nagoya) — Yuki Iwase
- Village Vanguard! 2 ~7nin no Osamurai-hen~ — Yuki Iwase

=== Movies ===
- Nannara Kimi to Tōku made (なんなら君と遠くまで) (March 24, 2012, short film)
- Idainaru, Shurarabon (偉大なる、しゅららぼん) (March 8, 2014, Toei) — Shione Natsume
- Nōshō Sakuretsu Girl (脳漿炸裂ガール) (2015) — main heroine
- Little Subculture Wars ~Village Vanguard no Gyakushū~ (October 23, 2020) — Yuki Iwase

=== Theatre ===
- Onmyoji (July 2017) — Mitsumushi
- Song to the Sun: Midnight Sun (タイヨウのうた ～Midnight Sun～) (September 2018 – October 2018) — Kaoru Amane
- ELF The Musical (November 2020) — Jovie
- Kage to Doku (September 4, 2022)
- PUNK 3 (June & October 2023)
- The Place Promised in Our Early Days -Special Reading Orchestra Concert- (November 2024) — Maki Kasahara
- Reading Opera <op.2> Madame Butterfly (March 2025) — Madame Butterfly
- Symphony Roudokugeki "Beethoven ~Tamashii no Koukyoukyoku~" (July 2025) — Julie "Giulietta" Guicciardi
- Reading Opera <op.3> La bohème (December 2025) — Mimi

== Bibliography ==
=== Photobooks ===
- Hinata Biyori (ひなた日和) (July 24, 2015, Wani Books)
- Dear. (September 5, 2018, Wani Books)
