= Rika Mayama =

Rika Mayama 真山りか
- Born: December 16, 1996 (age 29)
- Origin: Tokyo, Japan
- Genres: J-pop, Rock
- Occupations: singer; actress; voice actress
- Years active: 2009–present
- Label: Defstar Records
- Member of: Shiritsu Ebisu Chugaku (2009–present)
- Website: www.mayamarika.com

Rika Mayama (真山 りか, Mayama Rika; born on December 16, 1996) is a Japanese idol singer, and a member of the idol group Shiritsu Ebisu Chugaku.

Mayama performed one of the opening themes for the 2014 anime television series Akame ga Kill! ("Liar Mask", featured in episodes 15 and on). The song is a mix of J-pop and heavy metal.

== Discography ==
See also Shiritsu Ebisu Chugaku § Discography.

=== Solo singles ===
No.	Title	Release date	Charts
No.	Title	Release date	JP
1	"Liar Mask"	November 26, 2014	17

== Appearances ==
In 2011, she had an acting role in the film Kunoichi Ninpô-chô: Kage no Tsuki (as a Ninja assassin).

=== Anime ===
- Nanana's Buried Treasure (May – June, 2014, Fuji TV), Shizuka Kisaragi
- Akame ga Kill! (November 16, 2014, Tokyo MX), handmaiden
