= Kenichi Maeyamada =

Japanese musician (born 1980)

- 前山田 健一
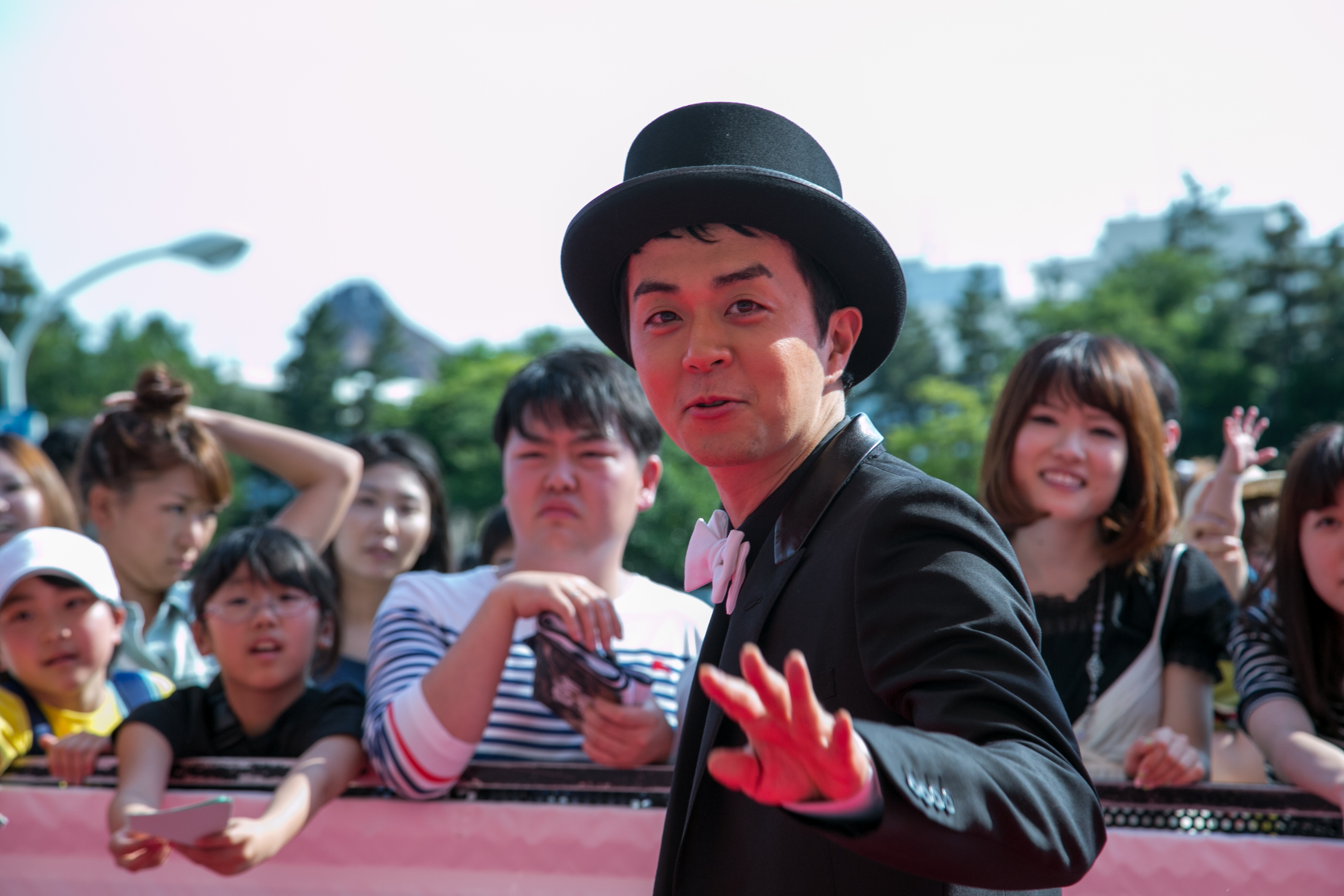
- Maeyamada at the 2014 MTV Video Music Awards Japan
- Born: July 4, 1980 (age 45); Sumiyoshi-ku, Osaka, Japan
- Other names: Hyadain
- Occupations: composer, lyricist, musician
- Years active: 2007—present

Kenichi Maeyamada (前山田 健一, Maeyamada Ken'ichi; born July 4, 1980), also known as Hyadain (ヒャダイン), is a Japanese composer, lyricist, and musician. His primary work is composing anime theme songs and for J-pop musicians. He contracts through Supalove, a Japanese record label. He has released a number of anime and video game music remixes, as well as original songs. These remixes have received over 20 million hits on YouTube and Nico Nico Douga.

== Musical style ==
Maeyamada began playing the piano at age four and first composed with a synthesizer in middle school. After graduating from Kyoto University, he apprenticed under lyricist Gorō Matsui. He got his first big break in 2007 for writing the lyrics to "Don't Go Baby", a song featured in Initial D Fourth Stage. In December 2007, he posted his first work under the name "Hyadain" on Nico Nico Douga, a remix of Crash Man's theme from Mega Man 2 with added lyrics. He initially struggled with criticism and accusations regarding these remixes' faithfulness to the source material. However, his videos gradually gained in popularity, particularly "Battle With the Four Fiends" from Final Fantasy IV and "Western Show" from Super Mario World. In May 2010, Maeyamada revealed that Hyadain was his pseudonym. In 2014, Maeyamada collaborated with Gummybear International and Avex Trax to translate Japanese version of "I Am A Gummy Bear (The Gummy Bear Song)", originally sung in English by Maci Schneider, a.k.a. Tonekind. In 2023, Maeyamada was invited to arrange a version of "Battle With the Four Fiends" for Final Fantasy XIV: Endwalker, with lyrics by Takashi Tokita. The track, "Forged in Crimson", plays during the boss fight with Rubicante, the Fiend of Flame.

Maeyamada cites Yasuharu Konishi of the Pizzicato Five as a major musical influence, as well as Shoichiro Hirata and Yusuke Itagaki. Influence on his video game music stems from Nobuo Uematsu (Final Fantasy), Koichi Sugiyama (Dragon Quest), and Kenji Ito (Romancing SaGa). Lyrically, both his original works and fanworks are reputed for utilizing strong elements of humor and nostalgia. For his own songs, he provides all the voices, male and female, with the help of a digital voice modifier. These voices, Hyadain and Hyadaruko, appear as characters on his blog and in the music videos for "Hyadain no Kakakata Kataomoi-C" and "Hyadain no Joujou Yuujou", with Hyadaruko being portrayed by various actresses including Natsuko Aso.
