= Distant Thunder =

Distant Thunder (or A Distant Thunder) may refer to:

== Film and television ==
- Distant Thunder (1973 film), a film by Indian director Satyajit Ray
- Distant Thunder (1988 film), a drama film by Rick Rosenthal
- Enrai, or Distant Thunder, a 1981 Japanese film directed by Kichitaro Negishi
- "Distant Thunder" (Upstairs, Downstairs), episode 12 of season 3 of the series, aired in 1971
- "Distant Thunder", episode 5 of the anime Koi Kaze

== Music ==
- Distant Thunder (album), a 1988 album by Aswad
- A Distant Thunder (album), a 1988 album by Helstar
- Distant Thunder, a 1987 album by Checkfield

== Other ==
- A Distant Thunder, a 2004 novel by neo-Nazi Harold Covington
