= Masa Takumi =

Japanese composer

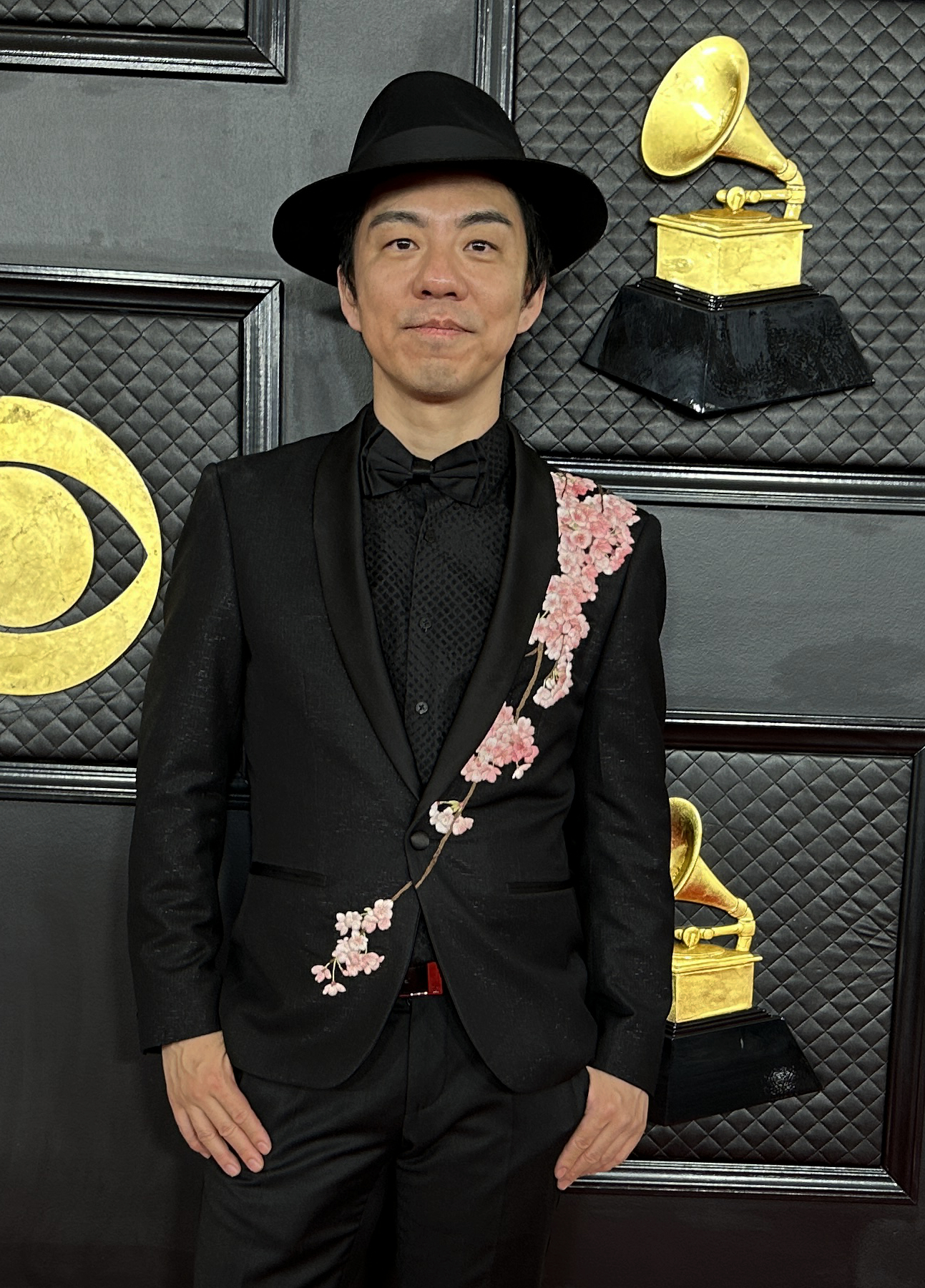
- Takumi at 2023 Grammys
- Born: Masanori Takumi; November 14, 1978 (age 47); Osaka, Japan
- Occupations: Composer; musician; music producer
- Years active: 2000–present
- Musical career
- Genres: Japanese instrumental; Pop; World; Contemporary Instrumental; New Age
- Instruments: Piano; guitar; bass; drums; shamisen
- Labels: BMG; Domo Records

Japanese name
- Kanji: 宅見将典
- Hiragana: たくみ まさのり
- Katakana: タクミ マサノリ
- Website: masa.world

Masanori Takumi (Japanese: 宅見将典, Hepburn: Takumi Masanori), better known as Masa Takumi, is a Japanese Grammy Award-winning multi-instrumentalist, composer, and music producer. He was nominated for a Grammy Award in 2014 for Best Reggae Album, won a Best Global Music Album for his solo album, Sakura, in 2023, and was nominated for a Grammy Award in 2024 for "Kashira" for Best Global Music Performance. His music video, Deep Down, was nominated for Best Independent Music Video at the Hollywood Music in Media Awards in 2018. He has written and produced songs for AAA, Da Pump, Eric Martin, and others.

Takumi is an anime TV series composer, arranger, and musician who is known for composing theme songs, arranging music, and performing on Claymore, Genshiken, Witchblade, Peach Girl and Koi Kaze, among others.

== Early life and career ==
Masa Takumi (also known as Masanori Takumi) was born in Osaka, Japan. He is the nephew of Hideki Saijo. Takumi started playing the trumpet at eight years old in his elementary school's brass band and started playing the drums and composing music at twelve years old. During his teen years he taught himself to play the guitar, bass, and piano. In 2000, Takumi joined the band, Siren where he was a songwriter, drummer, and sound producer. The group signed a record deal with BMG Japan but disbanded in 2004 and Takumi decided to pursue composing and producing full-time.

== Music career ==
Takumi is a composer and music producer, and plays the guitar, piano, bass, drums, and the shamisen.

In Asia, he has written and arranged songs for major recording artists Exile, Daigo, Da Pump, Cute, AAA, Shiritsu Ebisu Chugaku (Japan), Kara, and FT Island (South Korea), among others. Takumi also composes and produces music for numerous anime TV series such as Claymore, Witchblade, Peach Girl, Genshiken, and Koi Kaze.

He has worked with US recording artists, writing and producing music for Eric Martin and Terry Bozzio. In 2017, he wrote the song Let's Make A Video for Poppy and wrote Reflection for Trey Songz in 2018.

Takumi was nominated for a Grammy Award in 2014 for the album Reggae Connections, as a member of Sly and Robbie. He released Stars Falling in 2016, and his 2017 album Deep Down won a bronze medal for Best Contemporary Instrumental Music at the Global Music Awards 2018. The music video for Deep Down was nominated for a Hollywood Music In Media Awards for Best Independent Music Video in 2018. In 2020, Takumi began working with Domo Music Group and released, Heritage, which received favorable reviews.

Takumi's 2021 album release, Sakura, won a Grammy Award for Best Global Music Album in 2023. He was an associate producer on Stewart Copeland and Ricky Kej's 2023 album, Police Without Borders and was selected for Newsweek magazine's "100 Most Respected Japanese People in the World." Also in 2023, Takumi was invited by the United States Ambassador to Japan, Rahm Emanuel, to the U.S. Embassy in Tokyo, where he performed live.

In 2024, he was nominated for a Grammy award for "Kashira" for Best Global Music Performance.

== Awards ==
Year	Nominated work	Category	Award	Result
2024	Kashira	Best Global Music Performance	Grammy Award	Nominated
2023	Sakura	Best Global Music Album	Grammy Award	Won
2023	World Music	Best in Genre	Hollywood Independent Music Awards	Nominated
2018	Deep Down	Best Independent Music Video	Hollywood Music in Media Award	Nominated
2018	Deep Down	Best Contemporary Instrumental Music (Bronze)	Global Music Award	Won
2014	Reggae Connection	Best Reggae Album	Grammy Award	Nominated

== Discography ==
Year	Album	Artist	Credit
2022	Sakura (album)	Masa Takumi	Composer, musician
2020	Heritage (album)	Masa Takumi	Composer, musician, producer
2017	Deep Down (album)	Masa Takumi	Composer, musician, producer
2016	Stars Falling (album)	Masa Takumi	Composer, musician, producer
2012	Mr. Rock Vocalist (album)	Eric Martin	Co-producer, music arranger

=== Music in TV, film and videos ===
- 2021 – Sonic Boom: Rise of Lyric: Sonic Jr and Hoopa in the Clash of Ages (film) – (featured musician)
- 2013 – Pokémon: Black & White: Adventures in Unova – ending theme ("Te o Tsunagō" sung by Shiritsu Ebisu Chugaku)
- 2007 – Claymore – (TV series/22 episodes) – original soundtrack
- 2006 – Gift – Eternal Rainbow – (TV series/26 episodes) theme song arrangement
- 2006 – Otome wa Boku ni Koishiteru
- 2006 – Witchblade – (TV series/24 episodes) music
- 2004 – Genshiken – (TV series/12 episodes) – original soundtrack
- 2004 – Koi Kaze (TV mini-series) – music
- 2004 – Suzuka
- 2005 – Peach Girl – (TV series/25 episodes) music
- 2006 – Kujibiki Unbalance – music, theme song arrangement
