= Go! Go! Here We Go! Rock Lee / Otona wa Wakatte Kurenai =

- Brasil Edition cover

Single by Shiritsu Ebisu Chugaku

from the album Chunin
- A-side: "Go! Go! Here We Go! Rock Lee"; "Otona wa Wakatte Kurenai"
- B-side: "Hobo Brasil" (Limited Brasil Edition); "Stardust Light" (Limited Rock Lee Edition); "Shin•Seishun Sonomono" (Subculture Edition)
- Released: August 29, 2012 (Japan)
- Genre: Pop
- Label: Defstar Records
- Songwriters: Kenichi Maeyamada, Ayumi Tamura, etc.

Shiritsu Ebisu Chugaku singles chronology
"Karikeiyaku no Cinderella" (2012)	"Go! Go! Here We Go! Rock Lee / Otona wa Wakatte Kurenai" (2012)	"Ume" (2013)

Music videos
- "Go! Go! Here We Go! Rock Lee" (VEVO on YouTube)
- "Go! Go! Here We Go! Rock Lee" (SMEJ) on YouTube
- "Otona wa Wakatte Kurenai" (SMEJ) on YouTube

"Go! Go! Here We Go! Rock Lee / Otona wa Wakatte Kurenai" (Go!Go!Here We Go!ロック・リー/大人はわかってくれない; "Go! Go! Here We Go! Rock Lee / Adults Can't Understand") is the second major single by the Japanese girl idol group Shiritsu Ebisu Chugaku, released in Japan on August 29, 2012 by Defstar Records.

== Release details ==
The single was released in three versions: Subculture Edition (Regular Edition), Limited Brasil Edition, and Limited Rock Lee Edition.

The song "Go! Go! Here We Go! Rock Lee" is an ending theme for the new Naruto anime series Rock Lee & His Ninja Pals (from June 2012).

== Members ==
Shiritsu Ebisu Chugaku: Mizuki, Rika Mayama, Natsu Anno, Ayaka Yasumoto, Aika Hirota, Mirei Hoshina, Hirono Suzuki, Rina Matsuno, Hinata Kashiwagi

== Track listing ==
=== Limited Brasil Edition ===
No.	Title	Credits	Length
1.	"Go! Go! Here We Go! Rock Lee" (Go!Go!Here We Go!ロック・リー)	Lyrics, music, arrangement: Kenichi Maeyamada	4:05
2.	"Otona wa Wakatte Kurenai" (大人はわかってくれない)	Lyrics, music, arrangement: Ayumi Tamura	3:56
3.	"Hobo Brasil" (ほぼブラジル Hobo Burajiru)	Lyrics, music, arrangement: Satsuki ga Tenkomori	4:23
4.	"Go! Go! Here We Go! Rock Lee (Less Vocal)"
5.	"Otona wa Wakatte Kurenai (Less Vocal)"
6.	"Hobo Brasil (Less Vocal)"

=== Limited Rock Lee Edition ===
No.	Title	Credits	Length
1.	"Go! Go! Here We Go! Rock Lee"		4:05
2.	"Otona wa Wakatte Kurenai"		3:56
3.	"Stardust Light" (スターダストライト Sutādasuto Raito)	Lyrics, music, arrangement: fu_mou	5:08
4.	"Go! Go! Here We Go! Rock Lee (Less Vocal)"
5.	"Otona wa Wakatte Kurenai (Less Vocal)"
6.	"Stardust Light (Less Vocal)"

=== Subculture Edition (Regular Edition) ===
No.	Title	Credits	Length
1.	"Go! Go! Here We Go! Rock Lee"		4:05
2.	"Otona wa Wakatte Kurenai"		3:56
3.	"Shin•Seishun Sonomono" (新•青春そのもの)	Lyrics, music, arrangement: Takeshi Isozaki	4:26
4.	"Go! Go! Here We Go! Rock Lee (Less Vocal)"
5.	"Otona wa Wakatte Kurenai (Less Vocal)"
6.	"Shin•Seishun Sonomono (Less Vocal)"

== Charts ==
Chart (2012)	Peak position
Oricon Daily Singles Chart	2
Oricon Weekly Singles Chart	7
Oricon Monthly Singles Chart	36
Billboard Japan Hot 100	19
Billboard Japan Hot Singles Sales	6
Billboard Japan Hot Animation	1
