= Karikeiyaku no Cinderella =

- Limited A Edition cover

Single by Shiritsu Ebisu Chugaku

from the album Chunin
- B-side: "Hōkago Getabako Rock'n'Roll MX"; "Agero! Ebi Fry" (Limited Ē Edition); "Utae! Odore! Ebī Dada!" (Limited Bī Edition); "Kekka Allright" (Subculture Edition)
- Released: May 5, 2012 (Japan)
- Genre: Pop
- Label: Defstar Records
- Songwriters: Kazunori Watanabe, Kenichi Maeyamada, Satsuki ga Tenkomori, Ayumi Tamura

Shiritsu Ebisu Chugaku singles chronology
"Motto Hashire!!" (2011)	"Karikeiyaku no Cinderella" (2012)	"Go! Go! Here We Go! Rock Lee / Otona wa Wakatte Kurenai" (2012)

Music videos
- "Karikeiyaku no Cinderella" (VEVO) on YouTube
- "Karikeiyaku no Cinderella" (SMEJ) on YouTube
- "Hōkago Getabako Rock 'n' Roll MX" (VEVO) on YouTube
- "Hōkago Getabako Rock 'n' Roll MX" (SMEJ) on YouTube

"Karikeiyaku no Cinderella" (仮契約のシンデレラ; "Temporary Contract Cinderella") is the first major single by the Japanese girl idol group Shiritsu Ebisu Chugaku. It was released in Japan on May 5, 2012, by Defstar Records.

== Release details ==
The single was released in three versions: Subculture Edition (Regular Edition), Limited Ē Edition, and Limited Bī Edition.

== Members ==
Shiritsu Ebisu Chugaku: Mizuki, Rika Mayama, Natsu Anno, Ayaka Yasumoto, Aika Hirota, Mirei Hoshina, Hirono Suzuki, Rina Matsuno, Hinata Kashiwagi

== Track listing ==
=== Limited Ē Edition ===
No.	Title	Credits	Length
1.	"Karikeiyaku no Cinderella" (仮契約のシンデレラ)	Lyrics, music, arrangement: Katsuhiko Sugiyama	4:43
2.	"Hōkago Getabako Rock'n'Roll MX" (放課後ゲタ箱ロッケンロールMX Hōkago Getabako Rokkenrōru MX)	Lyrics, music, arrangement: Kenichi Maeyamada	4:31
3.	"Agero! Ebi Fry" (揚げろ!エビフライ Agero! Ebifurai)	Lyrics, music, arrangement: Kazunori Watanabe	4:07
4.	"Karikeiyaku no Cinderella (Less Vocal)"
5.	"Hōkago Getabako Rock'n'Roll MX (Less Vocal)"
6.	"Agero! Ebi Fry (Less Vocal)"

=== Limited Bī Edition ===
No.	Title	Credits	Length
1.	"Karikeiyaku no Cinderella"
2.	"Hōkago Getabako Rock'n'Roll MX"		4:31
3.	"Utae! Odore! Ebī Dada!" (歌え!踊れ!エビーダダ!)	Lyrics, music, arrangement: Satsuki ga Tenkomori	5:00
4.	"Karikeiyaku no Cinderella (Less Vocal)"
5.	"Hōkago Getabako Rock'n'Roll MX (Less Vocal)"
6.	"Utae! Odore! Ebī Dada! (Less Vocal)"

=== Subculture Edition (Regular Edition) ===
No.	Title	Credits	Length
1.	"Karikeiyaku no Cinderella" (仮契約のシンデレラ)
2.	"Hōkago Getabako Rock'n'Roll MX"		4:31
3.	"Kekka Allright" (歌え!踊れ!エビーダダ! Kekka Ōrai)	Lyrics, music, arrangement: Ayumi Tamura	4:05
4.	"Karikeiyaku no Cinderella (Less Vocal)"
5.	"Hōkago Getabako Rock'n'Roll MX (Less Vocal)"
6.	"Kekka Allright (Less Vocal)"

== Charts ==
Chart (2012)	Peak position
Oricon Daily Singles Chart	2
Oricon Weekly Singles Chart	7
Oricon Monthly Singles Chart	30
Billboard Japan Hot 100	15
Billboard Japan Hot Top Airplay	26
Billboard Japan Hot Singles Sales	6
Billboard Japan Adult Contemporary Airplay	98
