= What the Footman Saw =

- Upstairs, Downstairs episode
- Episode no.: Season 3 Episode 10
- Directed by: Christopher Hodson
- Written by: Jeremy Paul
- Original air date: 29 December 1973

Episode chronology
← Previous "Goodwill to All Men"	Next → "A Perfect Stranger"

"What the Footman Saw" is the tenth episode of the third series of the British television series, Upstairs, Downstairs. The episode is set in 1914.

== Plot ==
Edward Barnes goes as James Bellamy's footman for a weekend visit to Somerby, the country house of James' school-friend Lord "Bunny" Newbury. During his visit to Somerby Edward sees Lord Gilmour and Lady Tewkesbury together. Whilst socialising with fellow footmen in the Crown and Anchor public house, he claims that he knows Gilmour and the married Lady Tewkesbury spent the night together. This leads to the scandalous divorce case of Lord and Lady Tewkesbury.

== Cast ==
- Colonel Harry Tewksbury (Bernard Archard)
- Lord Charles Gilmour (Anthony Ainley)
- Gilmour's footman Joseph (Tony Bateman)
- Trumper (Walter Horsbrugh)
- Clough (Thomas Heathcote)
- Robert (Robin Sachs)
- John (David Goodland)
- Dillon's Clerk (Frank Tregear)
