= Jennifer McEvoy =

Jennifer McEvoy is an English actress who is best known for playing Mrs. Peel in the ninth episode Goodwill to All Men of the third series of the period drama Upstairs, Downstairs (22 December 1973).

She is also known for playing Gillian Baker in the twenty-third episode Why Baker Died of the sixth series of the British television series No Hiding Place (21 September 1964).

In 2007, she played a neighbour in the second episode Mortgage of the second series of the British television series Not Going Out (9 July 2008).
