= Te o Tsunagō / Kindan no Karma =

- Subculture Edition's cover

Single by Shiritsu Ebisu Chugaku

from the album Chunin
- B-side: "Sakura-go-round" (Limited Edition A); "Lon de Don" (Limited Edition B); "Another Day" (Subculture Edition)
- Released: June 5, 2013 (Japan)
- Genre: J-pop, pop
- Label: Defstar Records
- Songwriters: Tatsuki Yanagi, Masanori Takumi

Shiritsu Ebisu Chugaku singles chronology
"Ume" (2013)	"Te o Tsunagō / Kindan no Karma" (2013)	"Mikakunin Chūgakusei X" (2013)

Music videos
- "Te o Tsunagō" (VEVO) on YouTube
- "Te o Tsunagō" (SMEJ) on YouTube
- "Kindan no Karma" (SMEJ) on YouTube

Professional ratings
Review scores
Source	Rating
Rolling Stone Japan	3/5 stars
Billboard Japan	Positive

"Te o Tsunagō / Kindan no Karma" (手をつなごう/禁断のカルマ, Te o Tsunagō / Kindan no Karuma; "Let's Hold Hands / Forbidden Karma") is the 4th major single by the Japanese girl idol group Shiritsu Ebisu Chugaku. It was released in Japan on June 5, 2013, by Defstar Records.

== Release details ==
"Te o Tsunagō / Kindan no Karma" is a double A-side single. The single was released in three versions: Limited Edition A, Limited Edition B, and Subculture Edition (Regular Edition). "Te o Tsunagō" is the Japanese ending theme song for Pocket Monsters Best Wishes Season 2: Decolora Adventure, which aired from April 25 to October 3, 2013, while "Sakura-go-round" is the ending theme song for Pocket Monsters Best Wishes Season 2: Episode N, which aired from January 17 to April 18, 2013.

== Members ==
Shiritsu Ebisu Chugaku: Mizuki, Rika Mayama, Natsu Anno, Ayaka Yasumoto, Aika Hirota, Mirei Hoshina, Hirono Suzuki, Rina Matsuno, Hinata Kashiwagi.

== Track listing ==
=== Limited Pokémon Edition (Limited A Edition) ===
No.	Title	Credits	Length
1.	"Te o Tsunagō" (手をつなごう "Let's Join Hands")	Lyrics: Tatsuki Yanagi; Music, arrangement: Masanori Takumi
2.	"Kindan no Karma" (禁断のカルマ "Forbidden Karma")	Lyrics, music, arrangement: Katsuhiko Sugiyama
3.	"Sakura-Gō-Raundo" (サクラ・ゴーラウンド "Sakura-Go-Round")	Lyrics: Akihito Toda; Music, arrangement: Hirokazu Tanaka
4.	"Te o Tsunagō (Instrumental)" (手をつなごう（Less Vocal）)
5.	"Kindan no Karma (Instrumental)" (禁断のカルマ（Less Vocal）)
6.	"Sakura-gō-raundo (Instrumental)" (サクラ・ゴーラウンド（Less Vocal）)

=== Limited Karma Edition (Limited B Edition) ===
No.	Title	Credits	Length
1.	"Te o Tsunagō" (手をつなごう)
2.	"Kindan no Karma" (禁断のカルマ)
3.	"Lon de Don"	Lyrics, music, arrangement: Takeshi Isozaki
4.	"Te o Tsunagō (Instrumental)" (手をつなごう（Less Vocal）)
5.	"Kindan no Karma (Instrumental)" (禁断のカルマ（Less Vocal）)
6.	"Lon de Don (Instrumental)" (Lon de Don（Less Vocal）)

=== Subculture Edition (Regular Edition) ===
No.	Title	Credits	Length
1.	"Te o Tsunagō" (手をつなごう)
2.	"Kindan no Karma" (禁断のカルマ)
3.	"Another Day"	Lyrics: Fumi; Music: Hayashi, Fumi; Arrangement: Hayashi Hiroyuki
4.	"Te o Tsunagō (Instrumental)" (手をつなごう（Less Vocal）)
5.	"Kindan no Karma (Instrumental)" (禁断のカルマ（Less Vocal）)
6.	"Another Day (Instrumental)" (Another Day（Less Vocal）)

== Charts ==
Chart (2013)	Peak position
Oricon Daily Singles Chart	2
Oricon Weekly Singles Chart	5
