= Ume (song) =

- Limited A Edition cover

Single by Shiritsu Ebisu Chugaku

from the album Chūnin
- B-side: "Ganbatteru Tochū"; "Pakuchī" (Limited Edition A); "Daisuki Da yo" (Limited Edition B); "Odoru Gariben Chūgakusei" (Subculture Edition)
- Released: January 16, 2013 (Japan)
- Genre: Pop
- Label: Defstar Records
- Songwriters: Kenichi Maeyamada, etc.
- Producer: Kenichi Maeyamada

Shiritsu Ebisu Chugaku singles chronology
"Go! Go! Here We Go! Rock Lee / Otona wa Wakatte Kurenai" (2012)	"Ume" (2013)	"Te o Tsunagō / Kindan no Karma" (2013)

Music videos
- "Ume" (VEVO) on YouTube
- "Ume" (SMEJ) on YouTube
- "Ganbatteru Tochū" (SMEJ) on YouTube

Alternative cover
- Limited B Edition cover

Alternative cover
- Subculture Edition cover

Professional ratings
Review scores
Source	Rating
Rolling Stone Japan	3/5 stars
『Billboard Japan』（棚橋寛）	Positive

"Ume" (梅; "Plum") is the third major single by the Japanese girl idol group Shiritsu Ebisu Chugaku, released in Japan on January 16, 2013, by Defstar Records.

== Release details ==
The single was released in three versions: Subculture Edition (Regular Edition), Limited Edition A, and Limited Edition B.

== Chart performance ==
The single debuted at the 3rd position in the Oricon Daily Singles Chart.

== Members ==
Shiritsu Ebisu Chugaku: Mizuki, Rika Mayama, Natsu Anno, Ayaka Yasumoto, Aika Hirota, Mirei Hoshina, Hirono Suzuki, Rina Matsuno, Hinata Kashiwagi

== Track listing ==
=== Limited Ē Edition ===
No.	Title	Credits	Length
1.	"Ume" (梅, "Plum")	Lyrics, music, and arrangement: Kenichi Maeyamada	4:15
2.	"Ganbatteru Tochū" (頑張ってる途中)	Lyrics, music, and arrangement: Takafumi Ikeda	4:52
3.	"Pakuchī" (パクチー "Coriander")	Lyrics, music, arrangement: Satori Shoraishi	3:12
4.	"Ume (Instrumental)" (梅（Less Vocal）)
5.	"Ganbatteru Tochū (Instrumental)" (頑張ってる途中（Less Vocal）)
6.	"Pakuchī (Instrumental)" (パクチー（Less Vocal）)

=== Limited Bī Edition ===
No.	Title	Credits	Length
1.	"Ume" (梅, "Plum")		4:15
2.	"Ganbatteru Tochū" (頑張ってる途中)		4:52
3.	"Daisuki Da yo" (大好きだよ "I Love You")	Lyrics, music, arrangement: Kiyosumi Iida	3:22
4.	"Ume (Instrumental)" (梅（Less Vocal）)
5.	"Ganbatteru Tochū (Instrumental)" (頑張ってる途中（Less Vocal）)
6.	"Daisuki Da yo (Instrumental)" (大好きだよ（Less Vocal）)

=== Subculture Edition (Regular Edition) ===
No.	Title	Credits	Length
1.	"Ume" (梅, "Plum")		4:15
2.	"Ganbatteru Tochū" (頑張ってる途中)		4:52
3.	"Odoru Gariben Chūgakusei" (踊るガリ勉中学生)	Lyrics, music, arrangement: Katsuhiko Sugiyama	5:19
4.	"Ume (Instrumental)" (梅（Less Vocal）)
5.	"Ganbatteru Tochū (Instrumental)" (頑張ってる途中（Less Vocal）)
6.	"Odoru Gariben Chūgakusei (Instrumental)" (踊るガリ勉中学生（Less Vocal）)

== Charts ==
Chart (2013)	Peak position
Oricon Daily Singles Chart	1
Oricon Weekly Singles Chart	3
