= A Perfect Stranger (Upstairs, Downstairs) =

- Upstairs, Downstairs episode
- Episode no.: Season 3 Episode 11
- Directed by: Christopher Hodson
- Written by: Jeremy Paul
- Original air date: 5 January 1974

Episode chronology
← Previous "What the Footman Saw"	Next → "Distant Thunder"

"A Perfect Stranger" is the tenth episode of the third series of the British television series, Upstairs, Downstairs. The episode is set in 1914.

== Plot ==
Rose has become engaged to Gregory Walter Wilmot, a British sheep farmer living in Australia, who professes socialist views. They first meet on a tram in April 1914 when he accidentally sits on a plum cake she is carrying. They soon start courting. Gregory proposes on 12 April 1914 and gives Rose an engagement ring.

Gregory takes Rose to visit his friends. There, a childhood friend (and former love interest) of Gregory's becomes jealous and sneeringly declares that Gregory would be marrying below himself should he wed Rose. His other friends are more supportive, and encourage her to marry him. Rose agrees to go back to Australia with him and become his wife, but hesitant and fearful, she changes her mind at the last minute.

== Cast ==
=== Guest cast ===
- Gregory Wilmot (Keith Barron)

== See also ==
- Home Fires (Upstairs, Downstairs)
