= Chūnin (album) =

Studio album by Shiritsu Ebisu Chugaku
- Released: July 24, 2013 (Japan)
- Genre: J-pop, pop
- Label: Defstar Records

Shiritsu Ebisu Chugaku chronology
Ebichū no Zeppan Best: Owaranai Seishun (2012)	Chūnin (2013)	Kinpachi (2015)

Singles from Chūnin
- 1. "Karikeiyaku no Cinderella" Released: May 5, 2012; 2. "Go! Go! Here We Go! Rock Lee / Otona wa Wakatte Kurenai" Released: August 29, 2012; 3. "Ume" Released: January 16, 2013; 4. "Te o Tsunagō / Kindan no Karma" Released: June 5, 2013

Chūnin (中人; "Middle-schooler") is the first album by the Japanese girl group Shiritsu Ebisu Chugaku (also called Ebichu for short). The album was released in Japan on June 24, 2013 on the Sony Music Entertainment Japan's label Defstar Records.

== Background ==
The release was announced on June 9, 2013 during a release event for the band's latest single "Te o Tsunagō / Kindan no Karma", held at Lazona Kawasaki Plaza Ruefer Square Grand Stage (in Kanagawa Prefecture). It was announced that it would be the band's "first full album" and it would contain the songs from their first four major-label singles, a cover of Yellow Magic Orchestra's "Taiso" and some newly written songs, 14 tracks in total.

The album was released in 3 editions: Limited Edition Ē (CD+DVD), Limited Edition Bī (CD+DVD), and Subculture Edition (CD). The Subculture Edition had a limited first press version. The Limited Editions and the first press limited version of the Subculture Edition included bonuses: a trading card (randomly selected from a set of 9 that includes a card for each member) and an application leaflet (応募チラシ).

== Track listing ==
CD
No.	Title	Notes	Length
1.	"Chuning!! (Interlude)"
2.	"Karikeiyaku no Cinderella (long ver.)" (仮契約のシンデレラ(long ver.))	1st single.
3.	"Ume" (梅)	3rd single.
4.	"Atashi Kitto Mugen Looper" (あたしきっと無限ルーパー)	New.
5.	"R-O-B-O-C-K"	New.
6.	"Kōkō Haishi Hōan (Interlude)" (高校廃止法案(Interlude))
7.	"Hōkago Getabako Rock'n'Roll MX" (放課後ゲタ箱ロッケンロールMX)	1st single "Karikeiyaku no Cinderella" coupling track.
8.	"Otona wa Wakatte Kurenai" (大人はわかってくれない)	2nd single "Go! Go! Here We Go! Rock Lee / Otona wa Wakatte Kurenai" second A-side.
9.	"Taiso" (体操)	New. Cover of a Yellow Magic Orchestra song.
10.	"Kindan no Karma" (禁断のカルマ)	4th single "Te o Tsunagō / Kindan no Karma" first A-side.
11.	"Yūwaku Shitai ya" (誘惑したいや)	New.
12.	"Tuning Massaichū (Interlude)" (チューニング真っ最中(Interlude))
13.	"Ii Yu ka na" (いい湯かな?)	New.
14.	"Te o Tsunagō" (手をつなごう)	4th single "Te o Tsunagō / Kindan no Karma" first A-side.
15.	"Chūnin Dance Music" (中人DANCE MUSIC)	New.
16.	"Ganbatteru Tochū" (頑張ってる途中)	3rd single "Ume" coupling track.
17.	"Aruaru Hula Dance" (あるあるフラダンス)	New.

Limited Edition A DVD
No.	Title	Length
1.	"Mizuki… "Pakuchi"" (瑞季…「パクチー」)
2.	"Rika Mayama… "Agero! Ebi Fry"" (真山りか…「揚げろ!エビフライ」)
3.	"Natsu Anno… "Doshaburi Regret"" (杏野なつ…「どしゃぶりリグレット」)
4.	"Ayaka Yasumoto… "Fure! Fure! Cyalume"" (安本彩花…「フレ!フレ!サイリウム」)
5.	"Aika Hirota… "Utae! Odore! Ebī Dada!" (廣田あいか…「歌え!踊れ!エビーダダ!」)
6.	"Mirei Hoshina… "Hobo Brasil"" (星名美怜…「ほぼブラジル」)
7.	"Hirono Suzuki… "Kekka Alright"" (鈴木裕乃…「結果オーライ」)
8.	"Rina Matsuno… "Shin Seishun Sonomono"" (松野莉奈…「新・青春そのもの」)
9.	"Hinata Kashiwagi… "Ebichu Isshūkan"" (柏木ひなた…「エビ中一週間」)

(The DVD is included only into Limited Edition A and features nine karaoke videos, each track accompanied by a band member dancing.)

Limited Edition B CD 2
No.	Title	{{{extra_column}}}	Length
1.	"Ebisu Kumikyoku" (恵比寿組曲)	Remixed by Fragment.	approx. 40:00

(The CD is included only into Limited Edition B and features a 40-minute DJ mix containing Shiritsu Ebisu Chugaku's songs since the major debut and onwards.)

== Charts ==
Chart (2013)	Peak position
Oricon Weekly Albums Chart	7
