= Witchblade (2006 TV series) =

Japanese anime series

- Key visual of the series

ウィッチブレイド (Witchibureido)
- Genre: Post-apocalyptic; Superhero; Supernatural horror
- Created by: Top Cow Productions
- Anime television series
- Directed by: Yoshimitsu Ohashi
- Produced by: Masaru Nagai; Susumu Hieda; Takeyuki Okazaki
- Written by: Yasuko Kobayashi
- Music by: Masa Takumi
- Studio: Gonzo
- Licensed by: Crunchyroll: UK: MVM Films
- Original network: JNN (CBC, TBS)
- English network: US: IFC, Funimation Channel, Crunchyroll Channel; ZA: Animax
- Original run: April 6, 2006 – September 21, 2006
- Episodes: 24
- icon

Witchblade (Japanese: ウィッチブレイド, Hepburn: Uitchibureido) is a Japanese anime television series loosely based on the American comic book of the same name. It was directed by Yoshimitsu Ōhashi, with Yasuko Kobayashi handling series scripts, Makoto Uno designing the characters, and Masa Takumi composing the music. The series was broadcast for 24 episodes on CBC and TBS from April to September 2006. A packaged version of the series in eight DVD volumes was released, followed by a DVD box version released in 2008.

The series sets up an entirely new storyline with all new characters, but in the same continuity as the original comic books.

== Story ==
The series follows Masane Amaha, a kindhearted, well-intentioned woman who is clumsy and awkward around the house. Having lost her memory during the Great Quake which ravaged Tokyo, Masane was found uninjured at the quake's ground zero with a baby in her arms. Six years later she returns to Tokyo with the child, whom she believes is her daughter, intending to live a peaceful life. Masane becomes entangled in a power struggle between a large corporation and a government agency, and discovers that a mysterious bracelet on her right wrist is the legendary Witchblade.

== Characters ==
=== Main characters ===
Masane Amaha (天羽 雅音, Amaha Masane)
Voiced by: Mamiko Noto (Japanese); Jamie Marchi (English)
Masane is the bearer of the Witchblade. She became the Witchblade's bearer six years before the beginning of the series during an event that destroyed most of Tokyo, leaving her with amnesia and holding a baby girl. Masane is also an unemployed single mother, and is at odds with the NSWF's Child Welfare Division over issues concerning the custody of her adoptive daughter, Rihoko. When the Witchblade activates, her eyes turn demonically black and she dons a skimpy black armor with katana blades and claws extending from her arms and her hair, which was normally brown, but crimson upon transformation, can extend to tendrils that can lash or pierce her enemies. She also gains enhanced strength, speed, and endurance. She also gains a type of telepathic link to Rihoko, being able to sense when she is in danger. After unlocking new power in the Witchblade, her armor becomes red and she has a blade on both arms. When fighting, she is possessed by an almost uncontrollable desire for destruction, deriving an erotic like pleasure from battle. Prior to the Great Quake, her real name was Yasuka Ohara (大原 寧夏, Ōhara Yasuka), the name Masane Amaha given to her as part of a new I.D. created by the government due to her amnesia following the Great Quake.
Rihoko Amaha (天羽 梨穂子, Amaha Rihoko)
Voiced by: Akemi Kanda (Japanese); Carrie Savage (English)
Rihoko is Masane Amaha's adoptive daughter. Her biological mother is Reina Soho, and her biological father is Reiji Takayama. She was found as a newborn with an amnesiac young woman, who authorities believed to be her mother from a maternity diary found with them, at the epicenter of the Great Quake. Rihoko is apparently more compatible with the Witchblade than anyone else, and it was she who was responsible for Reina's initial high compatibility rating, because Reina was pregnant with Rihoko at the time. Rihoko is frequently praised for her good cooking capabilities. She is very mature for her age and is often noted for being more capable than Masane.
Yusuke Tozawa (斗沢 祐介, Tōzawa Yūsuke)
Voiced by: Masaya Matsukaze (Japanese); Robert McCollum (English)
Yusuke Tozawa is a freelance photographer seeking information about the Witchblade for a story, since he believes that it is associated with certain serial killings. He eventually becomes Masane's friend. He is among the first ones to nickname Masane "Masamune" ("Melony" in the English dub), referring to her huge chest ("masa-mune" meaning "undefeatable breasts", and "Melony" referring to her breasts as melons). This is carried over in the anime, to the point that Tozawa only refers to Masane with this nickname.
Reiji Takayama (鷹山 澪士, Takayama Reiji)
Voiced by: Rikiya Koyama (Japanese); Mark Stoddard (English)
Reiji Takayama is the Bureau Chief of Douji Group Industries and the biological father of Rihoko. He also is the one responsible for employing Masane to fight-off malfunctioning "Ex-cons", highly technological weapons developed by his own employers. Takayama is a stoic and very stern man who shows little to no expressions at all. He is usually accompanied by his assistant, Hiroki Segawa. Takayama seems to have a past relationship with Reina Soho, possibly a sexual one, as it is briefly discussed between himself, a point which he says is possible, which he later affirmed completely in Episode 19. They both had worked together before the ground-zero event in doing research on the Witchblade. Initially Takayama appears to be cynical and cold, but as the anime progresses this proves to be completely false as his relationship with Masane deepens. He and Masane later become romantically involved in episode 19. Masane later attempts to get him and Riko closer after learning he is her real father. He is last seen standing with Riko at the site of Masane's last fight, watching on as she sacrifices her life.
Reina Soho (蘇峰 玲奈, Soho Reina)
Voiced by: Mie Sonozaki (Japanese); Colleen Clinkenbeard (English)
The most powerful of the First Generation Cloneblades and the biological mother of Rihoko. Reina Soho is a Neogene who works as a Forensics Medicine Specialist in the National Scientific Welfare Foundation (NSWF). She is a strong and intelligent woman. Nevertheless, she is quite self-centered. Unlike most of her First-Generation counterparts, Reina has come to terms with the fact that Furumizu views her and the rest of her Neogene sisters as nothing more than tools at his disposal. By the same token, however, she feels no obligation to answer to his every beck and call. Her nickname as a Cloneblade is "Lady". In her youth, she was found to be a potential bearer for the "true" Witchblade. Eager to test the limits of her genetic potential, Reina and her assistant, Shiori Tsuzuki, attempted to forcibly remove the Witchblade from Masane. It turns out that Reina's high compatibility with the Witchblade was due to the fact that she was carrying Rihoko at the time, and after giving birth, her compatibility dropped significantly. Of all the Cloneblades, Reina was regarded as the most advanced of her Neogene sisters. As a Cloneblade, Reina bore a huge blade on her left forearm, and had wing-like appendages that could transform into robust shields from blades. Reina considered herself and everyone around her as objects to be researched. She even went so far as to seize custody of Rihoko, in order to test how motherhood would affect her mentally. Much to her surprise, she began to develop maternal feelings for the girl. The full extent of her love for Rihoko is revealed when she sacrifices herself to protect her from the psychopathic Neogene, Maria. Her cloneblade armor is white and pink.

=== Antagonists ===
Tatsuoki Furumizu (古水 達興, Furumizu Tatsuoki)
Voiced by: Shinji Ogawa (Japanese); R. Bruce Elliott (English)
The leader of the NSWF. He is known as "Father" by his Neogene "daughters" and the orphans in his care. While a brilliant scholar and influential philanthropist in his prime, Furimizu has all but withdrawn from public life by the story's present in his obsessive pursuit of the Witchblade. Despite exuberating charm and paternal warmth when interacting with the public and his "children", he is in reality an unrepentantly cruel narcissist, who has no regard for the physical and emotional well-being of those who serve him.
Throughout most of the plot, Furimizu and the NSWF devote their resources to hunting down the current Witchblade bearer, Masane Amaha. In the midst of tracking down Masane, he oversees the creation and training of numerous genetically-engineered women called "Neogenes" who are equipped with artificial replicas of the Witchblade (i.e. "Cloneblades"). Once he obtains the Witchblade, Furimizu plots to equip the strongest of his Neogenes with the supernatural weapon under the pretext of facilitating the next stage of human evolution. It is later revealed that the Neogenes are all in fact his biological daughters whom he is breeding to become the "perfect mother" for his own rebirth. After learning of his sordid plans for her and her sisters, an extremely powerful yet dangerously unstable Neogene, Maria, brutally murders Furimizu and assumes control of the NSWF in his place.
Maria (まりあ)
Voiced by: Nana Mizuki (Japanese); Monica Rial (English)
A powerful Second-Generation Cloneblade. As the strongest of the Second generation "sisters" engineered by the NSWF, she is the first to be equipped with a Dual Cloneblade. Her cloneblade armor is purple and red. She appears much older than she truly is which suggests that the sisters age rapidly. Maria undergoes many changes throughout the series. She starts out as a hyper, immature, and mentally unstable adolescent with an extreme inferiority complex. While extremely strong and dangerous, she is little more than an insecure child desperate for attention and a mother to call her own. This changes when her actual mother, Reina, rejects her. After killing Reina in a rage, her personality becomes almost catatonic. She also changes her appearance to match the deceased Reina's. After hearing of Furumizu's plans to use her as a surrogate mother for his "perfect" clone, her disgust transforms her into a ruthless megalomaniac who seeks power at all costs. She brutally kills Furumizu and seizes control of the NSWF. She pledges to transform the NSWF into an army that will secure power for herself as well as the Neogene "chosen ones". After sensing the immense power coming from the original Witchblade, she becomes determined to take it for herself. In truth, however, Maria is the leader of the organization in name only. With no clear goal other than to obtain power at all costs, Maria becomes even more secretive and reclusive than her late "father". With the exception of Aoi, cloneblades such as Asagi view her as an insecure child trying to "act tough". As Maria drifts aimlessly, Nishida effectively runs the entire organization and continues to use its resources to hunt for the Witchblade. Her Cloneblade form is not quite as heavily armored as the others. Nevertheless, it is by far the strongest. In her cloneblade form she is able to extend her fingers and impale her victims multiple times. The extent of her power can be seen when she pierces Reina's armor blades with ease. In the end, Maria meets her demise while fantasizing despairingly about her mother. In her final moments, she remorsefully asks the hallucination of her mother if "she still loved her". Maria barely has the chance to finish her sentence as she turns to crystal dust.
Nora (ノーラ, Nōra)
Voiced by: Saori Yumiba (Japanese); Stephanie Young (English)
Nora is a Neogene who serves as Tatsuoki Furumizu's assistant. She is one of Furimuzu's most loyal and reliable subordinates. Coolly arrogant and blunt in her interactions with others, she is very competitive with her sisters and is prone to jealousy. After watching Furimuzu reward Maria's tantrum with a trip to the toy store, Nora roughly manhandles her and confines her to a hotel room after the mentally unstable Neogene loses her temper in public. With the exception of Furumizu himself, she considers everyone and everything around her as a tool for her advancement. She is also a very powerful cloneblade. Unlike Masane and Shiori, she is able to effectively control her carnal impulses while transformed' much like Reina. Her nickname as a cloneblade is "Spider", she has the ability to shoot needles and entrap her opponents with strands from her hair and three rapier like blades on her left arm. She battled Masane and was able to capture her to have the Witchblade removed from her. She later is assigned by Nishida to obtain Rihoko for experimentation, but is stopped by Reina, the child's biological mother. Seeing this as an opportunity to finally have it out with her biggest rival, she takes on Reina, whom ultimately proves to be the better of the two after using the shield blades on her hair to impale and kill Nora. Her cloneblade armor is orange and green.
Aoi (あおい)
Voiced by: Ryōko Ono (Japanese); Caitlin Glass (English)
Aoi is the first sparring partner that Maria does not injure. They become good friends to the point of Aoi becoming her assistant and best friend later on in the anime, where she too is equipped with a Dual Cloneblade. As a Cloneblade she is melee fighter using fan like blades. She has small blue eyes and blond hair she wears in braids. She wears an orange dress. It is worth noting that Aoi is fanatically loyal to Maria, to the point of attacking Masane in a blind rage, for injuring Maria, later in the series. This proves to be fatal, as she is impaled and killed by Masane. Her last words were for Maria to continue her quest to obtain the Witchblade. It is also worth noting that Aoi is the only person Maria seems to care about, being her only friend, to the point of crying over her death. Her cloneblade armor is blue and orange.
Asagi (あさぎ)
Voiced by: Akeno Watanabe (Japanese); Clarine Harp (English)
Asagi is the sister chosen by Aoi when Maria asked her to choose a capable sister to help herself and Aoi fight and take the Witchblade from Masane. She also is equipped with the Dual Cloneblade. Sarcastic, cynical, and not afraid to speak her mind, she acts calmly but without any interest in her role, a behavior reflected in her physical appearance as well, often questioning for what or who Maria is acting, and what she really wants, which often earns a scolding from Aoi. For this very reason, Maria immediately kills her by impaling her in the stomach. Asagi is the only Cloneblade in the entire anime that does not fight (she does fight some exCons, but this is not shown). Her cloneblade armor is black and blue.
Shiori Tsuzuki (都築 栞, Tsuzuki Shiori)
Voiced by: Shizuka Itō (Japanese); Trina Nishimura (English)
Shiori acts as the secretary and assistant of Reina. She is a lesbian and is sexually infatuated with her employer (though this is mostly cut off in the censored version aired in Japan), whom she affectionately addresses as "Sensei" (or Doctor in the English dub). She is also a Cloneblade. She is the very first one to fight against Masane. Nicknamed "Diva", she acts arrogant and confident, but is soon revealed to have little to no control over her impulses as a Cloneblade. While in her Cloneblade form she sports a large scythe-like blade, and later gains one on both arms. She brutally beats Masane and chases her relentlessly only to be stopped by Reina herself. During her fight with Masane her Cloneblade is critically damaged. As a result, her impulses, emotions, and overall mental state become enslaved by the carnal drive of her cloneblade. She quickly becomes a psychotic maniac, slaughtering, seeking fight and even raping for pure pleasure. In the end, she succeeds in unlocking the full powers of the Cloneblade albeit for a short moment. After attacking and beating Masane, she sadistically attempts to rape Takayama. However, her body crumbles into crystal dust immediately before she is able to rape her beloved sensei's lover. Her cloneblade armor is blue and cyan, but turns to blue and red after unlocking her full power.
Rie Nishida (西田 りえ, Nishida Rie)
Voiced by: Sakiko Tamagawa (Japanese); Gwendolyn Lau (English)
Dr. Rie Nishida is the amoral chief researcher of the NSWF. After Furumizu's death, she and Wado become the story's main antagonists. Nishida is extremely obsessed with researching the capabilities of the Witchblade and cared little for any laws and restrictions that would be placed on her experiments. She has monitored and helped to create several generations of Neogenes at NSWF's secret facilities. Nishida was in charge of creating the fourth generation of Neogene sisters who were going to have Maria's genes as the ultimate mother. She switched her allegiance to Maria because she saw Furumizu as a fool for ignoring the many possibilities for the Witchblade and Neogenes in front of him in favor of his own pitiful desire. After Furumizu's death, Nishida is effectively in charge of the NSWF since Maria cared little for the day-to-day management of the corporation. With her new executive powers at NSWF, Nishida continues her secret alliance with Wado, who by this time is the new Bureau Chief of the Douji Group. After Masane stays with Takayama after his resignation from Douji, Nishida aids Wado in their attempts to claim the Witchblade for themselves. Nishida becomes increasingly fascinated with the Witchblade's full potential, seeing the chance to more fully understand a power close to God. During the iWeapon incident in Tokyo, Nishida becomes obsessed with the cataclysmic energy readings resulting from the conflict and drives closer to the violence in order to get a better examination. Heedless of the risk to her life, she fails to notice an incoming iWeapon that crushes her car and herself and the car explodes.
Masaya Wado (和銅将也, Wado Masaya)
Voiced by: Kazuhiro Nakata (Japanese); Kent Williams (English)
Masaya Wado is the Director of the Bio Division at Douji Group Industries. After Furumizu's death, he and Nishida become the story's main antagonists. He has known and competed with Takayama since college, where they were once members of a rowing team. At Douji, Wado constantly sought to outdo and eventually oust Takayama. When the Witchblade, worn by Masane, eventually returns to Douji, Wado's jealousy of Takayama grows and he secretly conducts his own experiments to create a weapon to rival the Witchblade, eventually conceiving the Ultimateblade. During this time, Wado secretly meets with Dr. Nishida of the NSWF in order to gain access to their own research on the Witchblade as well as Nishida's support with his agenda. Arrogant, psychotic, and ambitious, yet petty, cowardly and obsessive, Wado often pursues his goals while neglecting the consequences of his actions until it was too late. This is first demonstrated when he attempted to frame Takayama for the murderous rampages of the Ultimateblade. In doing so, he endangered Douji as a whole with a potential public scandal that was avoided only when Takayama voluntarily stepped down as Bureau Chief. In an incident that finally destroyed the Douji Group, Wado made several attempts to reclaim the Witchblade for his own, thus encouraging its growth in power. With this, Douji's iWeapons began to malfunction, yet Wado ignored the potential dangers. When hundreds of iWeapons malfunctioned and escaped a cargo ship to converge on Tokyo with the goal of destroying the Witchblade, Wado finally realizes the magnitude of his actions. He desperately turns to Takayama for help in stopping the iWeapons and saving Douji from ruin. Takayama declares that it would be impossible since there were too many lives at stake and that Wado had no one to blame but himself, completely shattering Wado's hopes and driving him into complete depression. The last time Wado is seen, he has apparently gone insane from the enormity of his loss with reporters approaching from behind him. What happened to him after that is unknown.
Yagi (八木)
Voiced by: Ayumu Hasegawa (Japanese); Kevin M. Connolly (English)
Yagi is the meek assistant of Masaya Wado. Following Wado's failure to outdo Takayama with the Ultimateblade, his employer forces him to wear an Ultimateblade in a psychotic attempt to assassinate Takayama. However, he goes mad and is driven to unpredictably homicidal, murderous rages, barely held in check by Wado's team of scientists. While on the verge of a complete blade induced breakdown, Wado takes advantage of his diminished sanity and sends him to kill Takayama, with the false promise of helping him. He attacks Takayama at his home, but Masane is there with him and engages him. While he initially had the upper hand on her, Masane unlocks a new transformation of the Witchblade and ultimately kills him. His ultimate blade form is sage with red marks.

=== Minor characters ===
Hiroki Segawa (瀬川 弘樹, Segawa Hiroki)
Voiced by: Kenichi Suzumura (Japanese); Christopher Bevins (English)
Segawa Hiroki is Reiji Takayama's assistant and right hand man. He is always prepared and is a very capable assistant. He is the kind of person who loves power and his loyalty lies with who ever is stronger. He describes himself as a person who loves to follow those who have power, and demonstrates it by switching sides with whoever wields the most powerful position within Dohji Industries. He is last seen standing with the Dohji recovery team on a bridge wishing Takayama good luck.
Mariko Natsuki (奈月マリ子, Natsuki Mariko)
Voiced by: Maiko Itou (Japanese); Laurie Steele (English)
Owner of the Natsuki Building where Masane and Rihoko live. She is also the proprietress of the Marry's Gallery bar on the first floor. She is brash and sharp tongued, but is a kindhearted person who has a soft spot for Rihoko.
Mr. Cho (チョーさん, Chō-san)
Voiced by: Shouto Kashii (Japanese); Jerry Russell (English)
A wacky old man, who is a Natsuki Building fixture. A master of IT related matters, he is famous in the world of hackers. He is quite perverted, often known for trying to peek in the woman's baths but is really a good person who looks out for Rihoko and is frequently seen chatting with and supporting her.
Naomi (ナォミ, Naōmi)
Voiced by: Mika Itou (Japanese); Cherami Leigh (English)
A fortune teller who sets up shop in the Natsuki Building, but her extreme shyness around strangers and her sensitivity hurts her business. She is often the object of Mr. Cho's teasing.
Michael (マイケル, Maikeru)
Voiced by: Daisuke Kirii (Japanese); J. Michael Tatum (English)
A towering figure, taller than most of the other characters, who lives in the top floor of the Natsuki Building. He hardly ever says a word, but is apparently famous in some circles, though it is unknown what for.
Sakurai (櫻井)
An agent of the NSWF's child welfare group, she attempted to remove Rihoko from Masane's care due to their lack of a home and employment.
Nikada (ニカダ)
A detective in the Tokyo Police Department in charge of the investigation of mysterious deaths of NSWF personnel, unaware that the perpetrators are X-Cons. He often crosses paths with Tozawa, who constantly agitates him. He also personally knew the human identity of one of the X-Cons prior to his death.

== Release ==
Produced by Gonzo and directed by Yoshimitsu Ohashi, Witchblade was broadcast from April 6 to September 21, 2006, on CBC and TBS. From episodes 1–13 and 24, the first opening theme song is "XTC" by Psychic Lover. From episodes 14–23 the second opening theme is "Dear Bob", by Koologi. From episodes 1–12, the first ending theme is "Ashita no Te" (あしたの手) by Mamiko Noto. From episodes 13–23, the second ending theme is "Kutsuhimo" (靴ひも) by Asami Yamamoto. For episode 24, the ending theme is "Kodō: Get Closer" (鼓動 -get closer-) by Psychic Lover.

In North America, the series was licensed by Funimation (later Crunchyroll, LLC). They release the series on six DVD sets from September 25, 2007, to April 29, 2008. A Blu-ray box set was released on November 3, 2009. In the United Kingdom, the series was licensed by MVM Films, with six DVD sets released from February 4 to December 15, 2008. A Collector's Blu-ray edition was released on March 13, 2023. In the United States, the series was broadcast on the cable network IFC from January 4 to June 13, 2008. In South Africa, the series was broadcast on Animax. Crunchyroll added the series to their catalog in February 2018, streaming it in its original Japanese language with English subtitles. Following the announcement that Funimation would be unified under the Crunchyroll brand, the English dubbed episodes were added to the platform in February 2023.

=== Episodes ===
No.	Title	Directed by	Written by	Original release date	U.S. airdate
1	"The Beginning"; Transliteration: "Shi" (Japanese: 始)	Hiroyuki Tsuchiya	Yasuko Kobayashi	April 6, 2006	January 4, 2008
Six years after losing her memory, Masane Amaha returns to Tokyo with her daughter Rihoko to start a new life. But after trying to stop the NSWF, who wants to separate them, she ends up in jail. There she is attacked by a monster and awakens a mysterious power called the Witchblade.
2	"Bewilderment"; Transliteration: "Waku" (Japanese: 惑)	Naotaka Hayashi	Yasuko Kobayashi	April 13, 2006	January 11, 2008
After awakening the immense powers and abilities of the Witchblade, Masane is captured and used as a test subject. Meanwhile, Rihoko escapes from the NSWF and starts to search for her. Masane is informed of her role as bearer of the Witchblade and forced to fight an I-Weapon.
3	"Defiance"; Transliteration: "Kō" (Japanese: 抗)	Hiroatsu Agata	Yasuko Kobayashi	April 20, 2006	January 18, 2008
After savagely destroying an I-Weapon, Masane receives an offer to work for Takayama, but she only cares about looking for her daughter. Later, Takayama is contacted by a mysterious woman who has a bracelet similar to the Witchblade.
4	"Movement"; Transliteration: "Dō" (Japanese: 動)	Takatsugu Takahashi	Yasuko Kobayashi	April 27, 2006	January 25, 2008
Masane and Rihoko start to look for a place to live. Meanwhile the appearance of the Witchblade starts to draw the attention of the NSWF leader Furumizu. Masane is confronted by the Neogenes.
5	"Search"; Transliteration: "Tan" (Japanese: 探)	Tomoya Kunisaki	Yasuko Kobayashi	May 4, 2006	February 1, 2008
In search for the truth, Tozawa tries to interrogate Masane but she refuses to talk. Masane learns of the NSWF's Cloneblades. Meanwhile, Shiori, one of the Cloneblades, decides to challenge the bearer of the real Witchblade for a fight.
6	"Change"; Transliteration: "Hen" (Japanese: 変)	Satoshi Saga	Yasuko Kobayashi	May 11, 2006	February 8, 2008
Masane was badly injured in her fight against Shiori and had to be rescued by Dohji's men. Tozawa, who witnessed the match, decided to investigate Masane's employers. Reina starts to investigate the strange behavior Shiori has been showing after her bout with Masane.
7	"Past"; Transliteration: "Ka" (Japanese: 過)	Yoshinobu Tokumoto	Yasuko Kobayashi	May 18, 2006	February 15, 2008
Masane, while recovering from her fight with Shiori, gets to know Takayama and Reina were in love in the past. Shiori goes berserk from overuse of the Cloneblade, unlocking a new level of power in the process, and attacks Masane again. After beating her, Shiori's blade breaks down causing her body to crystallize.
8	"Reciprocity"; Transliteration: "Go" (Japanese: 互)	Masaharu Tomoda	Yasuko Kobayashi	May 25, 2006	February 22, 2008
An Ex-Con suddenly attacks Tozawa and Masane in their investigation, and Masane is forced to wield the Witchblade in front of the journalist. In the fight, Masane senses something different about the Ex-Con. Meanwhile, Reina tries to make contact with Rihoko.
9	"Sadness"; Transliteration: "Ai" (Japanese: 哀)	Eiichi Kuboyama	Toshiki Inoue	June 1, 2006	February 29, 2008
Masane and Tozawa get to know an incredible fact about the Ex-Con series. After talking to Nakata they realize that the Ex-Con is human. In a battle, Masane regretfully destroys the Ex-Con.
10	"Interaction"; Transliteration: "Kō" (Japanese: 交)	Naotaka Hayashi	Yasuko Kobayashi	June 8, 2006	March 7, 2008
Masane accompanies Takayama to a party and conflicts there with Wado, Takayama's rival at Dohji. She discovers that Ex-Cons are manufactured from corpses signed over to Dohji.
11	"Danger"; Transliteration: "Ki" (Japanese: 危)	Mitsuru Kawasaki	Yasuko Kobayashi	June 15, 2006	March 14, 2008
Maria, a new generation of Neogenes, is introduced. During the time Rihoko is in the hospital, a Cloneblade, Nora, attacks Masane to kidnap the real Witchblade bearer and succeeds.
12	"Prisoner"; Transliteration: "Shū" (Japanese: 囚)	Takashi Kobayashi	Yasuko Kobayashi	June 22, 2006	March 21, 2008
Masane has been captured. Nishida, a researcher of the NSWF, finds from Masane's data that Reina actually is not a potential bearer of the Witchblade. Masane escapes from the NSWF with Takayama and Tozawa's help. Masane receives startling news about her relation to Rihoko.
13	"Separation"; Transliteration: "Betsu" (Japanese: 別)	Yukio Okazaki	Yasuko Kobayashi	June 29, 2006	March 28, 2008
A government agent tells that Masane is not a true parent and she needs to get Rihoko back to her real mother. After hearing it, they run away and hide themselves. Nishida sends Nora there to capture Rihoko, knowing of her compatibility with the Witchblade, but Reina interrupts. In a fight, Reina kills Nora. Masane gives Rihoko to Reina after thinking she's unfit to be her mother.
14	"Family"; Transliteration: "Ka" (Japanese: 家)	Masanori Takahashi	Kiyoko Yoshimura	July 6, 2006	April 4, 2008
Rihoko begins to live at Reina's house. Takayama takes a disappointed Masane out to where she had lived before the earthquake disaster. In the NSWF, Maria is looking forward to meeting her "mom".
15	"Bonds"; Transliteration: "Han" (Japanese: 絆)	Yū Nobuta	Yasuko Kobayashi	July 13, 2006	April 11, 2008
Masane stays over with Takayama. Meanwhile, Maria rushes out to meet Reina, her "genetic" mother, but her hope turns into madness when she finds Reina does not love her at all. In her fit of rage, Maria kills Reina. Before dying she tells Takayama of her feelings.
16	"Relaxation"; Transliteration: "Kei" (Japanese: 憩)	Satoshi Saga	Kiyoko Yoshimura	July 20, 2006	April 18, 2008
Masane, Rihoko and their neighbors go to the beach. Masane spends her momentary but peaceful hours. She also learns that Rihoko may be in line to take on the Witchblade, to which she promises not to let that happen. She is also horrified to learn the Witchblade may kill her.
17	"Confusion"; Transliteration: "Saku" (Japanese: 錯)	Masaharu Tomoda	Yasuko Kobayashi	July 27, 2006	April 25, 2008
Masane, shocked by words of Takayama's secretary Segawa, begins to show her excessive love for Rihoko. Tozawa gets information of the personal history of Furumizu. Wado puts into action his plan to eliminate Takayama as his competition by unveiling the Ultimate blade, a blade created to be wielded by a man.
18	"Turn"; Transliteration: "Ten" (Japanese: 転)	Matsuo Asami	Kiyoko Yoshimura	August 3, 2006	May 2, 2008
The connection between Dohji and the serial murder case becomes public, and Takayama loses his position to Wado. Meanwhile, Masane's too much passion to Rihoko embarrasses the daughter and the neighbors.
19	"Feelings"; Transliteration: "Shi" (Japanese: 思)	Naotaka Hayashi	Yasuko Kobayashi	August 10, 2006	May 9, 2008
Takayama disappears. Masane, ignoring him and restarting to work under Wado at first, gradually accepts her true feelings and finally visits Takayama and the two kiss. But an Ultimateblade, sent by Wado, attacks them and Masane confronts it. In the fight, the Witchblade transforms and then shows signs of breakdown. Meanwhile, "grown up" Maria kills Furumizu.
20	"Request"; Transliteration: "Gan" (Japanese: 願)	Masahiro Sekino	Kiyoko Yoshimura	August 17, 2006	May 16, 2008
Maria takes over the NSWF. Meanwhile, after Takayama's "dating" with Rihoko, planned by Masane, an assassin falls on them. This incident makes Masane wield the Witchblade in front of her daughter. Masane collapses after the fight.
21	"Vow"; Transliteration: "Sei" (Japanese: 誓)	Takatsugu Takahashi	Kiyoko Yoshimura	August 31, 2006	May 23, 2008
It becomes apparent that Masane's body is breaking down from the Witchblade's power. Masane tries to remove the Witchblade to resist her fate. After realizing it is useless, she swears to drag the Witchblade with her to Hell.
22	"Inform"; Transliteration: "Koku" (Japanese: 告)	Yū Nobuta; Yasushi Shingō	Yasuko Kobayashi	September 7, 2006	May 30, 2008
Masane, prepared for her death, takes Rihoko to a picnic to say farewell to her daughter. Meanwhile, Wado sends out several I-Weapons to try to capture the Witchblade, which the public has learned of its existence.
23	"Chaos"; Transliteration: "Ran" (Japanese: 乱)	Masaharu Tomoda	Yasuko Kobayashi	September 14, 2006	June 6, 2008
The residents of Masane's apartment building learn of her secret. The tremendous power of the Witchblade makes Dohji's 3800 autonomous weapons rampage and begin to aim at the bearer. After knowing it, doomed Masane proceeds to her last battle place.
24	"Light"; Transliteration: "Kō" (Japanese: 光)	Naotaka Hayashi	Yasuko Kobayashi	September 21, 2006	June 13, 2008
Dohji's thousands of weapons and Maria attack Masane one after another, and the Bladewielder confronts them with her body increasingly collapsed. Rihoko, watching the mother's battle through TV live news, cannot help but rush out to where Masane is. In an act of self sacrifice, Masane uses every ounce of power in the Witchblade to destroy herself, the Witchblade, and every single I-Weapon.
