= Goodwill to All Men =

- Upstairs, Downstairs episode
- Episode no.: Season 3 Episode 9
- Directed by: Christopher Hodson
- Written by: Alfred Shaughnessy & Deborah Mortimer
- Original air date: 22 December 1973

Guest appearances
- Georgina (Lesley-Anne Down); Daisy Peel (Jacqueline Tong); Mrs. Peel (Jennifer McEvoy); Bill (Dan Gillan)

Episode chronology
← Previous "The Bolter"	Next → "What the Footman Saw"

Goodwill to All Men is the tenth episode of the third series of the British television series, Upstairs, Downstairs. The episode is set during Christmas 1913. It introduces Richard's ward Georgina Worsley (Lesley-Anne Down) and housemaid Daisy (Jacqueline Tong), both of whom remain central characters until the series' final episode.

== Plot ==
Georgina Worsley (born 28 November 1895) arrives to live at Eaton Place in 1913. She is the step-daughter of Lady Marjorie's brother Hugo Talbot-Carey (the new Earl of Southwold). His new wife is the widow Marion Worsley, and mother of Georgina by her previous marriage. Georgina's natural father died in a hunting accident when she was six years old. Her mother and step-father die along with Lady Marjorie in the sinking of the RMS Titanic in 1912. After that she moves into 165 Eaton Place right before Christmas in December 1913. Georgina is deeply moved by Daisy Peel's (the new under house parlour maid) history of her family. Georgina goes with Daisy and a lot of presents to Daisy's family in Hoxton. But Daisy's father is dead and her mother is now married to a drunk and violent alcoholic named Bill. Daisy sees that her mother is ill and is run out of the house by Bill’s violent behaviour.

== Cast ==
Regular cast

- Georgina Worsley (Lesley-Anne Down)
- Daisy Peel (Jacqueline Tong)

Guest cast

- Lady Southwold (Cathleen Nesbitt)
- Mrs. Peel (Jennifer McEvoy)
- Bill (Dan Gillan)
