= Koi Kaze =

Japanese manga series

- First tankōbon volume cover, featuring Nanoka Kohinata

恋風
- Genre: Romantic drama; Slice of life
- Manga
- Written by: Motoi Yoshida
- Published by: Kodansha
- Magazine: Evening
- Original run: August 20, 2001 – October 26, 2004
- Volumes: 5
- Anime television series
- Directed by: Takahiro Omori
- Produced by: Yasuyuki Ueda; Schreck Hedwick; Nobuyuki Yamamoto; Shōjiro Abe
- Written by: Noboru Takagi
- Music by: Makoto Yoshimori; Masanori Takumi
- Studio: A.C.G.T
- Licensed by: NA: Geneon USA (expired)
- Original network: TV Asahi, Kids Station
- Original run: April 1, 2004 – June 17, 2004
- Episodes: 13
- icon

Koi Kaze (Japanese: 恋風; lit. 'Love Wind') is a Japanese manga series written and illustrated by Motoi Yoshida. It was published in Kodansha's seinen manga magazine Evening from August 2001 to October 2004, with its chapters collected in five tankōbon volumes by Kodansha. The series tells of the incestuous relationship that develops between 28-year-old Koshiro, and his 15-year-old sister, Nanoka.

It was adapted into a 13-episode anime television series by A.C.G.T. Directed by Takahiro Omori, it was broadcast on TV Asahi from April to June 2004; only twelve episodes of the series aired, with the remaining episode streamed online and later included in both DVD releases and when the series aired in reruns as the eighth episode. The anime series was licensed for release in North American by Geneon USA, which released three DVD volumes in 2005.

== Synopsis ==
Twenty-eight-year-old Koshiro Saeki, who lives with his father Zenzo, is dumped by his girlfriend Shoko of two years, who claims he was too cold and she had found someone else. While on a train the morning after, he sees high school student Nanoka Kohinata looking at a button and crying. Later, as she is getting off the train, she unknowingly drops her train pass and Koshiro follows to return it to her. Koshiro finds himself watching her sudden smile as she notices the cherry blossoms are in bloom. Later, Koshiro is leaving his job at a marriage-arranging company with a coworker when he encounters the same girl again. Having two free tickets to a nearby amusement park, he gives them to her. To his surprise, she asks him to go with her. While on the Ferris wheel, the girl explains that she was crying on the train because she'd been rejected by a boy she had been in love with for several years. Koshiro ends up telling her about his own break up, and cries while she comforts him.

As they leave the park together, having enjoyed the outing and expecting to part and never meet again, they run into their father and are shocked to discover they are siblings. Nanoka moved to Tokyo just that morning to live with them because their home is closer to her new high school. As Koshiro hadn't gone home the night before, he hadn't learned of her arrival. Since they had grown up living separately, they didn't know what the other looked like.

As the series progresses, Koshiro finds himself unable to rid himself of the attraction that he felt for Nanoka when he first met her. Instead, his love and desire continue to grow, despite his attempts to fight them. Entering womanhood, Nanoka also develops feelings for her older brother, only increasing Koshiro's struggle. In near desperation, he moves out of the family home to remove himself from temptation and attempts to keep his coworker, Kaname Chidori, from finding out the truth behind his brusqueness with Nanoka.

However, the solution is only temporary, as Nanoka begins visiting Koshiro regularly, cooking him meals and spending time with him. Eventually, unable to resist their feelings anymore, they share a passionate kiss and have sex with each other. Unsure of what to do now that they have broken a societal taboo, they visit their parents, before contemplating committing suicide together. In the end, they decide to live, and to continue their relationship.

== Characters ==
Koshiro Saeki (佐伯 耕四郎, Saeki Kōshirō)
Voiced by: Kenta Miyake (Japanese); Patrick Seitz (English)
A 28-year old largely-built man usually sporting a five o'clock shadow, Koshiro works for a marriage-arranging company and lives with his divorced father. He had almost completely forgotten that he had a little sister until she came and moved in with them. He finds himself battling with society's definition of what an older brother should be and his sexual and romantic feelings for his sister.
Nanoka Kohinata (小日向 七夏, Kohinata Nanoka)
Voiced by: Yuki Nakamura (Japanese); Stephanie Sheh (English)
Nanoka is a 15-year-old high school girl who has moved to Tokyo to live with her father and older brother to attend school. A bright and active girl, she grows increasingly fond of her older brother, though is regularly annoyed with his brusque nature. Her friends unwittingly tease her about having a "brother complex", not realizing that Nanoka is actually falling in love with him.
Zenzo Saeki (佐伯 善三, Saeki Zenzō)
Voiced by: Ryoichi Tanaka (Japanese); Doug Stone (English)
Zenzo is Koshiro and Nanoka's father. He is prone to bouts of hysterical worry and cares for both of his children, though in particularly Nanoka.
Makie Kohinata (小日向 梢絵, Kohinata Makie)
Voiced by: Yuko Kato (Japanese); Wendee Lee (English)
Makie is Koshiro and Nanoka's mother. Until moving to Tokyo, Nanoka lived with her mother, who runs a hair salon. She rarely sees Koshiro, though she speaks to him fondly when he visits.
Kaname Chidori (千鳥 要, Chidori Kaname)
Voiced by: Akemi Okamura (Japanese); Michelle Ruff (English)
Kaname is Koshiro's supervisor and appears to be around his age. While she is often critical of his sloppy appearance, she encourages him where she can. When Koshiro first sees Nanoka outside his job, Chidori encourages him to go on a date with her, not learning until later that Nanoka is his sister. She eventually becomes suspicious of the siblings' relationship, and upon realizing she is correct, attempts to get them to end things, even trying to convince Nanoka that she is dating Koshiro. When she realizes that the siblings can't be happy unless they are together, she decides to leave them alone in hopes they can live with their choice. She shares the same name as Kaname Chidori from Full Metal Panic!.
Kei Odagiri (小田切圭, Odagiri Kei)
Voiced by: Kosuke Okano (Japanese); Liam O'Brien (English)
Odagiri works in the same office as Koshiro and Kaname Chidori. He is the office pervert, who always wants a teenage girl as his significant other, revised after meeting Nanoka to wanting a younger teenage sister. He serves as a contrast to Koshiro, and as comic relief.
Futaba Anzai (安西 双葉, Anzai Futaba)
Voiced by: Satomi Akesaka (Japanese); Kari Wahlgren (English)
Futaba is Nanoka's first friend at her high school. She has brown hair worn in two twintails, and wears glasses.
Yoko Tamaki (玉木 洋子, Tamaki Youko)
Voiced by: Risa Shimizu (Japanese); Heather Klinke (English)
Yoko is a friend of both Nanoka and Futaba. with short blonde hair. She attends the same high school as them, but is in a different class. In Episode 3, Youko is shown to have a boyfriend who went to cram school with her. Before meeting Nanoka, she and Futaba went to the same middle school together.
Kazuya Miyauchi (宮内 和也, Miyauchi Kazuya)
Voiced by: Ryoya Kobayashi (Japanese); Johnny Yong Bosch (English)
Kazuya is a male classmate of Nanoka and Futaba. He has an older sister who is two years older than him.
Shoko Akimoto (秋元 翔子, Akimoto Shouko)
Voiced by: Ryoka Yuzuki (Japanese); Karen Strassman (English)
Shoko was Koshiro's ex-girlfriend at the beginning of the series. The reason she broke up with him was because she believed that he was "too cold" towards her and she had found another boyfriend.

== Media ==
=== Manga ===
Written and illustrated by Motoi Yoshida, Koi Kaze was serialized in Kodansha's seinen manga magazine Evening from the magazine's inaugural issue in August 20, 2001, to October 26, 2004, in the magazine's 22nd issue that year. Kodansha collected its 35 chapters in five tankōbon volumes, released from March 22, 2002, to December 21, 2004.

==== Volumes ====
No.	Release date	ISBN
1	March 22, 2002	978-4-06-352004-0
Chapter 1: The Snow of Spring (春、ふる); Chapter 2: An Unhappy Morning (目覚めの悪い朝); Chapter 3: Stop Calling Me Brother! (お兄ちゃん禁止); Chapter 4: "Let's Sleep Together Every Night" (「毎晩一緒に寝ようね」); Chapter 5: Till the Full Moon Comes (月が満ちるまで); Chapter 6: Puberty (思春期); Chapter 7: Ghost of Suspicion (夏の午後はうたたね); Bonus: Summer's Afternoon Nap
2	November 22, 2002	978-4-06-352015-6
Chapter 8: Summer Holidays (夏の休日); Chapter 9: Mother's Lover (お母さんの恋人); Chapter 10: Cute, Cute Little Sister (かわいいかわいい妹); Chapter 11: Like, Hate, Like (すき、きらい、すき); Chapter 12: Love Letter (恋文); Chapter 13: The Way to Become Siblings (兄妹になる方法); Chapter 14: A Romantic Autumn (ロマンチック); Special: Little Sister's Kingdom
3	July 23, 2003	978-4-06-352036-1
Chapter 15: The Warmth of December (12月の温度); Chapter 16: To Say Honestly (本当はね); Chapter 17: Running Girl (疾走少女); Chapter 18: Jacket Colored With Love (恋色セーター); Chapter 19: Two People Wandering the Face of the Earth (境界線上のふたり); Chapter 20: First Love (はつ恋); Chapter 21: Public Notice (告白); Omake: Playing in a Department Store
4	March 23, 2004	978-4-06-352061-3
Chapter 22: Observer (傍観者); Chapter 23: Brother, I Am Sorry (ごめんねお兄ちゃん); Chapter 24: No Way There (出口なし); Chapter 25: Summer * Alone ~ There Are Feelings? (夏・独り・ここにある気持ち); Chapter 26: What if Memories Change? (いつか思い出にかわるなら); Chapter 27: Luckily, So Far Away (幸せ、どういうこと); Chapter 28: Koshiro's Abandoned Things (耕四郎の捨てるもの)
5	December 21, 2004	978-4-06-352091-0
Chapter 29: A Long Night for the Two (Part 1) (ふたりの長い夜（前編）); Chapter 30: A Long Night for the Two (Part 2) (ふたりの長い夜（後編）); Chapter 31: The End of Summer (夏のおわり); Chapter 32: The Love of a Lifetime (生涯の恋); Chapter 33: Scene of a Family (家族の風景); Chapter 34: Exposure to the Sun (陽だまり); Final: And Then, It's Spring Again (そしてまた春)

=== Anime ===
A 13-episode anime television series by Geneon Entertainment and Rondo Robe and directed by Takahiro Omori, was broadcast on TV Asahi from April 1 to June 17, 2004. The series also aired on Kids Station. TV Asahi refused to air the eighth episode; it aired on Kids Station and also streamed online on the Geneon Entertainment website and included in the subsequent DVD releases. Geneon released the series across five DVD volumes in Japan, with the first volume released on July 23, 2004, and the final volume released November 25, 2004.

The anime series is licensed for release in North American by Geneon USA which released it across three DVD volumes in 2005.

The episodes uses two pieces of theme music. "Koi Kaze" by éf is used as the opening song for all of the episodes except for episode twelve, which does not have an opening sequence. "Futari Dakara" (ふたりだから) by Masumi Itō is used for the series ending theme.

==== Episodes ====
No.	Title	Original release date
1	"First Flower"; Transliteration: "Hatsuhana" (Japanese: 初花)	April 1, 2004
Koshiro Saeki is recovering from breaking up with his girlfriend Shoko Akimoto. On his way to work on the train, he first meets Nanoka Kohinata while returning a train pass that she dropped as she was trying to exit the train. After returning to his house from work, he finds out from his father, Zenzo Saeki, that his sister, whose face he can no longer remember, will be moving into their house for an easier commute to her school. The next day, Shoko visits him during lunch break to get back the key to her apartment. At the end of the work day, a customer gives Koshiro's co-worker Kaname Chidori two tickets to the theme park nearby. She gives them to Koshiro, suggesting that he get back together with Shoko. Upon leaving the customer's office, Koshiro meets Nanoka again and impulsively gives the two tickets to her. She suggests that they go together, and they spend the rest of the day at the nearby theme park, later consoling each other on their love lives. Their father appears at the end of the day to pick Nanoka up, revealing to both that they are siblings.
2	"Apprehension of Spring"; Transliteration: "Shunshō" (Japanese: 春宵)	April 8, 2004
Koshiro is uncomfortable with Nanoka's doting presence as he struggles with his feelings towards her. Nanoka takes over many of the household chores and even makes a bento for Koshiro. He reaches his limit when she arrives at his office to visit him, telling her to never visit him again and stop calling him her big brother. To work off her anger, Nanoka goes out with some friends, Futaba Anzai and Youko Tamaki, to eat ice cream and karaoke until night. On her way back, she calls once again via payphone, but is yelled at by Koshiro again. However, she forgives him when he goes to pick her up on his bicycle and he gives her permission to call him 'big brother' again.
3	"Gentle Breeze"; Transliteration: "Kunpū" (Japanese: 薫風)	April 15, 2004
Unable to sleep, occupied with thoughts of Nanoka, Koshiro remembers from his childhood what helped him to sleep on such sleepless nights. After he wakes up, he gives the teddy bear he has kept to Nanoka, and she then gives hers to him, both made by their mother, Makie Kohinata. Futaba develops a brief crush on a boy she sees on the train, only to find that he is her friend Youko's boyfriend. Upon returning home, Koshiro finds Nanoka taking aspirin, finding out later that she is having menstrual cramps. On his day off the next day, it begins to rain, prompting him to wait for her at the train station with his umbrella.
4	"Evening Shower / Summer Shower"; Transliteration: "Yūdachi" (Japanese: 夕立)	April 22, 2004
At this time, Koshiro is sensitive about people thinking that he has picked up or is dating a high school girl. While out to go see a movie with Nanoka in the afternoon, Koshiro bumps into Shoko. After the movie, he sends Nanoka home and visits Shoko, explaining that Nanoka is his sister. They end up having dinner together in the evening. He fleetingly wonders if they might get intimate afterwards; however, she tells him her new boyfriend is visiting her. Frustrated, Koshiro goes home, and he inadvertently knocks over the laundry basket, with Nanoka's bra, while changing. He starts sniffing it, but is interrupted by Nanoka coming downstairs and finding him in the laundry. Afterwards, he is stricken with guilt and fear that he had been discovered, but nevertheless masturbates upstairs in his room while thinking of Nanoka.
5	"Distant Thunder"; Transliteration: "Enrai" (Japanese: 遠雷)	April 29, 2004
Koshiro is burdened and angry over his guilt at sniffing Nanoka's bra. He is shocked to find that Nanoka has emptied the trashcan in his room while doing the chores. He shouts at her for invading his privacy, though she does not know that the trashcan contained soiled tissues from the previous night. That night, as he returns home from drinking with Kaname at the bar, Koshiro accidentally drops and breaks Nanoka's rice bowl when she surprises him while he was remembering sniffing her bra. The next day at work, Kaname informs Koshiro that it is Nanoka's birthday, asking him to meet Nanoka at the train station with an umbrella. He rushes off, hoping that he can make amends for his bad behavior. He buys Nanoka flowers and apologizes. After he promises to buy her anything she wants for a birthday present, she picks out a new rice bowl for herself. Walking home, she has forgiven him and cleared things up to her satisfaction. He, on the other hand, wonders how things ended up like this, thinking "Wasn't I going to make everything right?"
6	"Autumnal Melancholy"; Transliteration: "Shūshi" (Japanese: 秋思)	May 6, 2004
His guilt has faded a bit, but Koshiro is still burdened by shame that he thinks of Nanoka when he masturbates. Nanoka discovers that she has developed a reputation at school for having a brother complex. After working late on the upcoming school festival, she is walked home by a male schoolmate named Kazuya Miyauchi. Koshiro encounters them and shouts at her for being so incautious with boys. She protests her innocence and his jealousy shows when he blurts out that she has to be careful because she is cute. Nanoka is shocked by his declaration, suddenly seeing him in a new light, and Koshiro hastily tries to walk back what he said. The next day, Nanoka avoids him by leaving early and gets jostled and groped on the train. That evening Koshiro gets home very late, and leaves very early the next morning. On the third morning Koshiro offers to commute together with Nanoka, and apologizes for earlier. He protects her on the train from the crowding in the car, and she finds herself unwittingly responding to his physical closeness.
7	"First Storm"; Transliteration: "Hatsuarashi" (Japanese: 初嵐)	May 13, 2004
Miyauchi gives Nanoka a love letter from Kazuyuki Asano, a student from his class who has a crush on Nanoka, but she has no idea how to respond to it. She shows Koshiro the letter and asks him what she should do, secretly hoping that he will tell her to reject the boy who wrote it. Koshiro, in an effort to be a good brother, instead advises her to try dating Asano for the day of the festival and see how things work out. Confused by her feelings, Nanoka meets Asano on the day of the festival and turns him down. He apologizes with no hard feelings, but she is left wondering about her 'strange' feelings and why she was thinking of Koshiro the whole time. A day later, Nanoka is walking home when she sees Koshiro behind her and accidentally drops her grocery bag in surprise. She chases after the contents of the bag, and Koshiro grabs her before she runs into an oncoming motorbike. In the ensuing conversation, he inadvertently calls her by name for the first time, startling her. She says that it's unfair that she's always the one who gets surprised, and blurts out that she likes him. (In Japanese, the phrase she uses can mean either 'like' or 'love', depending on context.) Assuming the latter interpretation, Koshiro blushes and Nanoka laughs, calling his reaction strange, before running home ahead of him.
8	"Dew Frost"; Transliteration: "Tsuyujimo" (Japanese: 露霜)	July 7, 2004
Koshiro remembers the birth of his sister and their life together before their parents' divorce. They were too far apart in age to understand each other, and Koshiro's first memories are all about her crying whenever she saw him, to the point where their parents asked if he was bullying her. In the present, Koshiro goes to see his mother Makie for the first time in many years, in an attempt to learn why Nanoka wanted to live with him and Zenzo. She tells him how much Nanoka looked up to her big brother and tells him to be a good big brother to her. He asks what she would do if he did something that made Nanoka's life miserable. After a pause, she answers that if he did she would never forgive him. She puts that aside and resumes asking him to look after Nanoka. On the train ride back, he remembers an incident when toddler Nanoka gave him a glass of mud at the playground, and he ended up keeping it because it made her so happy. When he returns home, he resolves to watch over Nanoka, according to the fate that he is her big brother, and he asks fate that she stop saying she 'likes' him.
9	"Wind Flower"; Transliteration: "Kazehana" (Japanese: 風花)	May 20, 2004
Koshiro contemplates moving out to put an end to his emotional conflict. Nanoka plans to knit him a sweater for Christmas. Later on, Koshiro calls Nanoka at home and asks her to bring an envelope he forgot to his workplace. He agrees to go home with her after he finishes his work and she waits out front. While she observes him from the waiting room, she sees him competently doing his job. As they make their way home together in the evening, Nanoka tells Koshiro of her reputation at school of working hard and that she comes off as serious. She thinks she isn't really like that. She also remarks that he is different at work than at home. Even though he thinks that he is a liar, Nanoka embraces him and tells him otherwise. The following night, Koshiro finds Nanoka asleep in his bedroom when returning home from work. Things get awkward when he loses himself for a moment and asks if she wants to sleep with him for the night. She asks him how he feels about her, and says that she loves him, but he forces himself to tell her that saying something like that is strange. Distraught, she tries to run away, but he grabs her and embraces her tightly. She breaks away from his arms and flees to her own bedroom.
10	"Wintry Moon"; Transliteration: "Kangetsu" (Japanese: 寒月)	May 27, 2004
Nanoka leaves for school before Koshiro gets up. After Koshiro mentions to Kaname that he intends to move out of home as soon as possible, she takes him on a search for an apartment. At school, Nanoka is reluctant to go home. Worried, Futaba invites her to stay overnight at her home instead. Futaba's sister Wakaba cooks dinner, and the three of them talk about Wakaba's upcoming arranged marriage. Wakaba says that marriage is not just about love, but other practical matters as well. Koshiro returns home to tell Zenzo that he plans to move out, but is interrupted by a phone call from Nanoka. They apologise to each other about the events of the previous night; Nanoka says that she might come home that night after all, and Koshiro hastily ends the call. However, Nanoka turns up just as Koshiro is telling Zenzo about his plans to move out. She is upset, but later comes to Koshiro's room and asks if she can sleep in his bed that night. He reluctantly agrees, but says that they will never meet again after this. When she wants to know why, he bluntly says that she should already know why, then tells her that he has had strong feelings for her since their first date at the amusement park. He can't allow those feelings to grow any further. They hold hands on the bed, with their backs to each other. The next morning, Nanoka wakes up to find Koshiro gone and the bedroom empty.
11	"Lingering Winter"; Transliteration: "Yokan" (Japanese: 余寒)	June 3, 2004
A month and a half after Koshiro has moved out, both the siblings are still thinking of each other, but keeping their promise not to see each other again. Nanoka sometimes walks by his workplace, but avoids meeting him. Kaname has taken to sleeping over at Koshiro's apartment because it is closer to their workplace than her apartment. One day when they are going to his apartment, they see Nanoka outside. He pushes Kaname away to hide from Nanoka. Kaname objects to the rough treatment. She guesses that he left home because of Nanoka, then chooses to laugh it off as "every family has its problems", before jokingly relating Odagiri's theory that Koshiro might have been acting inappropriately towards Nanoka. Koshiro snaps and angrily says enough to give Kaname enough of the true picture. She confronts him, accuses him of perversion, and walks away. He stays home from work the next day because of this. When he opens his front door to make a second trip to the store, Nanoka is standing there.
12	"Spring Thunder"; Transliteration: "Shunrai" (Japanese: 春雷)	June 10, 2004
Nanoka has broken their promise and has come to Koshiro's apartment to see him. She has brought a bag of fruit, worried that he isn't eating well. She offers to make him a meal, but his refrigerator is empty and he goes out to pick up some things. In the meantime, Kaname drops by to retrieve the train pass she had left there, and is shocked to find Nanoka there. She tries to make Nanoka go home by telling her that she is going out with Koshiro, but Nanoka refuses, saying that her feelings for her brother are greater. She insists that Kaname leave instead. Kaname encounters Koshiro on his way home and tries to talk sense into him, but he will not listen. Kaname begins to see that they truly love each other and apologizes, that she was wrong to have accused him of one-sided obsession the day before, and that she will not interfere anymore. At this point Koshiro is sad to have lost a friend, Chidori, while Nanoka is burdened by doubt that Koshiro might be in a relationship with Chidori. After they talk, the siblings accept that they really do love each other and want to be together no matter what. They spend the night together as lovers.
13	"Heat Haze"; Transliteration: "Kagerō" (Japanese: 陽炎)	June 17, 2004
Koshiro and Nanoka visit Makie's house together and give her a helping hand with chores. That night, they walk to a pier, and they question whether or not they should commit shinjū. Although he is saddened and confused, she is fine either way as long as she is with him. Koshiro decides to quit his job, and Kaname wishes him well on his way out. Koshiro stands outside Zenzo's house and apologizes. Zenzo's job takes him to the amusement park, which is to be demolished and redeveloped into a shopping mall. He expresses regret that the cherry trees outside the park will all have to be cut down. Koshiro and Nanoka frolic in the playground near the amusement park, to the disapproving stares of the local matrons. Then they hide and stay in the theme park where they met after it closes. They sit on the Ferris wheel in the middle of the night and try to move it by prayer. In the morning, they carve their names on one of the cherry trees in a Japanese version of "<heart> Koshiro + Nanoka", and promise to go back there every spring. When Nanoka has walked off to go home, Koshiro says to himself that he loves her.

=== CDs ===
A full-size version of the series ending theme, "Futari Dakara" was released to CD single by Masumi Itō on May 26, 2004. A complete CD soundtrack followed on July 23, 2004. The soundtrack contains 31 tracks, including various instrumental background pieces composed by Masanori Takumi and Makoto Yoshimori, the full size opening theme, and the TV version of the ending theme.

== Reception ==
"Koi Kaze is not a series which is going to suit everyone's tastes due to its subject matter. It has the potential, though, to be the year's premiere romantic anime series." — Theron Martin, Anime News Network.

"With the first third of the show on this volume, it's definitely one of the better structured doomed romances that I've seen in anime in a long time." — Chris Beveridge, Mania.

"There are a million ways this series could have gone wrong. Instead, Koi Kaze deserves the highest marks possible for its thoughtful, honest, and mature handling of such a difficult and controversial issue." — Carlos Ross, THEM Anime Reviews.

"Koi Kaze is not a reassuring show, but if it skirts the edge of disaster instead of plunging in, it may offer warmth to lonely, troubled people, and that's worth a lot." — Christian Nutt, Newtype USA.
