= Pokémon: Black & White: Adventures in Unova and Beyond =

Sixteenth season of the Pokémon animated television series

- Season 16
- Top: Pokémon: Black & White: Adventures in Unova title logo Bottom: Pokémon: Black & White: Adventures in Unova and Beyond title logo
- No. of episodes: 45 + 2 specials (Japanese version); 45 (English version)

Release
- Original network: TV Tokyo
- Original release: October 11, 2012 – September 26, 2013

Season chronology
- ← Previous; BW: Rival Destinies Next → XY

Pokémon: Black & White: Adventures in Unova and Beyond (Note: Advertised as Pokémon: BW: Adventures in Unova and Beyond. It is also known as Pokémon: Black & White: Adventures in Unova (advertised as Pokémon: BW: Adventures in Unova). Known in Japan as: Pocket Monsters: Best Wishes! Season 2 (ポケットモンスター ベストウイッシュ シーズン2, Poketto Monsutā Besuto Uisshu Shīzun Tsū); Pocket Monsters: Best Wishes! Season 2: Episode N (ポケットモンスター ベストウイッシュ シーズン2 エピソードN, Poketto Monsutā Besuto Uisshu Shīzun Tsū Episōdo Enu); Pocket Monsters: Best Wishes! Season 2: Decolora Adventure (ポケットモンスター ベストウイッシュ シーズン2 デコロラアドベンチャー, Poketto Monsutā Besuto Uisshu Shīzun Tsū Dekorora Adobenchā)) is the sixteenth season of the Pokémon anime series and the third and final season of Pokémon the Series: Black & White. (Note: Known in Japan as Pocket Monsters: Best Wishes! (ポケットモンスター ベストウイッシュ, Poketto Monsutā Besuto Uisshu, literally "Pocket Monsters: Best Wishes!")) It originally aired in Japan from October 11, 2012, to September 26, 2013, on TV Tokyo, and in the United States from February 2, 2013, to December 7, 2013, on Cartoon Network.

The season follows Ash Ketchum as he continues travelling through the Unova region with Iris and Cilan. Later on, they visit the Decolore Islands while travelling to the Kanto region by boat.

== Episode list ==
Jap. overall	Eng. overall	No. in season	English title Japanese title	Original release date	English air date
Pokémon: Black & White: Adventures in Unova
757	751	1	"Beauties Battling for Pride and Prestige!" (The World's Most Magnificent Pokémon!? Chillaccino vs. Tsutarja!); Transliteration: "Sekaiichi Karei na Pokemon!? Chirachīno tai Tsutāja!" (Japanese: 世界一華麗なポケモン！？チラチーノVSツタージャ！)	October 11, 2012	February 2, 2013
Learning that the Unova League will be held at Vertress City, Ash and his friends prepare for the Unova League Conference, but not before making a detour towards Iris' hometown, the Village of Dragons. But along the way, Iris drags the boys and their Pokémon into competing against a group of women who believe that their Pokémon are not only powerful but more beautiful than anyone else's.
758	752	2	"A Surface to Air Tag Battle Team!" (A Sky and Earth Tag Battle!); Transliteration: "Ōzora to Daichi no Taggu Batoru!" (Japanese: 大空と大地のタッグバトル！)	October 18, 2012	February 9, 2013
On the way to the Unova League Vertress Conference, Ash and Cilan get challenged to a Tag Battle against the brothers Soren and Rocko who have trained their Braviary (Soldier of the skies) and Drilbur (Warrior of the land) to perform amazing combination attacks.
759	753	3	"A Village Homecoming!" (Iris Returns to the Dragon Village!); Transliteration: "Airisu, Ryū no Sato e Kaeru!" (Japanese: アイリス、竜の里へ帰る！)	October 25, 2012	February 16, 2013
Ash, Cilan, and Iris find their way to Iris's hometown: the Village of Dragons. While there, Iris shows Axew to her elder and helps her childhood friend Shannon when one of her Zweilous suddenly evolves into Hydreigon and goes out of control.
760	754	4	"Drayden Versus Iris: Past, Present, and Future!" (Sōryū Gym! Iris vs. Shaga!!); Transliteration: "Sōryū Jimu! Airisu tai Shaga!!" (Japanese: ソウリュウジム！アイリスVSシャガ！！)	November 8, 2012	February 23, 2013
The gang arrives in Opelucid City for Iris' scheduled rematch against the Gym Leader and Dragon Master Drayden, who handed her and Excadrill their first-ever defeat years ago. Upon arrival, Iris remembers her difficult time in going to school there and trying to adjust to urban life. She and the others then travel to the Opelucid Gym for her rematch with Drayden, where she respectively puts her Excadrill and Dragonite to the test against Drayden's Haxorus and Druddigon in order for him to evaluate her training and skills.
761	755	5	"Team Eevee and the Pokémon Rescue Squad!" (Dispatch Team Eevee! Pokémon Rescue Squad!!); Transliteration: "Chīmu Ībui Shutsudō seyo! Pokemon Resukyū Tai!!" (Japanese: チーム・イーブイ出動せよ！ポケモンレスキュー隊！！)	November 15, 2012	March 2, 2013
Near Vertress City, the gang meets the Pokémon Rescue Squad's Virgil - trainer of Team Eevee - and his brother Davey, whom they decide to assist in helping a group of troubled Cryoganal.
762	756	6	"Curtain Up, Unova League!" (The Isshu League Higaki Tournament Begins! Satoshi Against Shooty!!); Transliteration: "Kaimaku: Isshu Rīgu Higaki Taikai! Satoshi tai Shūtī!!" (Japanese: 開幕 イッシュリーグ・ヒガキ大会！サトシ対シューティー！！)	November 22, 2012	March 9, 2013
The Unova League Vertress Conference begins, and as the preliminary round matches get underway, Ash finds himself up against Trip.
763	757	7	"Mission: Defeat Your Rival!" (Fierce Fighting! The Rival Battle Leads to Victory!!); Transliteration: "Nettō! Raibaru Batoru o Kachinuke!!" (Japanese: 熱闘！ライバルバトルを勝ちぬけ！！)	November 29, 2012	March 16, 2013
Ash's battle against Trip continues, with Pikachu facing Serperior and ending in Pikachu's favor. As the preliminaries end and the first round begins, Bianca pits her Escavalier and Emboar against Cameron's Samurott and Riolu.
764	758	8	"Lost at the League!" (Kibago Gets Lost!); Transliteration: "Kibago Maigo ni Naru!" (Japanese: キバゴ迷子になる！)	December 6, 2012	March 23, 2013
During a break in the competition, Iris's Axew follows a balloon and gets lost in Vertress City. Pikachu manages to track him down, but they are cornered by a group of Trubbish and their Garbodor leader.
765	759	9	"Strong Strategy Steals the Show!" (Dageki Appears! Satoshi Against Kenyan!!); Transliteration: "Dageki Tōjō! Satoshi tai Keniyan!!" (Japanese: ダゲキ登場！サトシ対ケニヤン！！)	December 13, 2012	March 30, 2013
The third round of battles at the Vertress Conference begins, and Ash finds himself up against Stephan, putting Krookodile, Palpitoad, and Leavanny up against Stephan's Liepard, Zebstrika, and Sawk.
766	760	10	"Cameron's Secret Weapon!" (Satoshi Against Kotetsu! The Secret Weapon Sazandora!!); Transliteration: "Satoshi tai Kotetsu! Himitsu Heiki Sazandora!!" (Japanese: サトシ対コテツ！秘密兵器サザンドラ！！)	December 20, 2012	April 6, 2013
In the fourth round of matches, Ash battles against Cameron - who begins the match by revealing his secret weapon, Hydreigon.
767	761	11	"A Unova League Evolution!" (The Isshu League Ends! Pikachu Against Lucario!!); Transliteration: "Ketchaku Isshu Rīgu! Pikachū tai Rukario!!" (Japanese: 決着イッシュリーグ！ピカチュウ対ルカリオ！！)	January 10, 2013	April 13, 2013
Ash's Snivy and Pikachu must face off against Cameron and his newly evolved Lucario.
768	762	12	"New Places... Familiar Faces!" (Araragi Laboratory! A New Journey!!); Transliteration: "Araragi Kenkyūjo! Aratanaru Tabidachi!!" (Japanese: アララギ研究所！新たなる旅立ち！！)	January 17, 2013	April 20, 2013
With the Unova League Vertress Conference come to an end, Ash and company return to Nuvema Town to meet up with Professor Juniper and to tell Professor Oak about his results. Along the way, they meet Nanette who is going to see Juniper for her first Pokémon, and eventually chooses Tepig. Nanette then has a tag battle with Ash against Cilan and Iris. However, during the battle, a robot piloted by Team Rocket appears to steal Pikachu. Later, Professor Juniper gets a call from her father, who invites Ash and friends to visit him at the White Ruins, located north of Icirrus City.
769	763	13	"The Name's N!" (Friend... His Name Is N!); Transliteration: "Tomodachi... Sono Na wa Enu!" (Japanese: トモダチ…その名はN！)	January 24, 2013	April 27, 2013
On a boat heading to see ruins dedicated to Reshiram, Ash, Iris, and Cilan meet the mysterious boy calling himself N, who quickly befriends their Pokémon. However, when Team Rocket attacks the group once more and James's Amoonguss paralyzes Pikachu with Stun Spore, N's timely intervention helps turn the tide of the fight.
770	764	14	"There's a New Gym Leader in Town!" (The New Gym Leader Cheren!); Transliteration: "Shin Jimu Rīdā Cheren!" (Japanese: 新ジムリーダー・チェレン！)	January 31, 2013	May 4, 2013
The group's boat arrives in Aspertia City, and they arrange to meet Cheren, Professor Juniper's acquaintance and the city's new Gym Leader. A teacher at the local Pokémon School, Cheren is lacking in confidence regarding his worth for the title, something Cilan - as a former Gym Leader himself - connects with him over. After misadventures in the Pokémon House on the school grounds - including a series of mishaps between Cilan, Pansage, and a flock of Ducklett - Ash has an unofficial Gym match against Cheren, with Oshawott facing off against Herdier.
771	765	15	"Team Plasma's Pokémon Power Plot!" (Achroma vs. Handsome! The Team Plasma Conspiracy!!); Transliteration: "Akuroma tai Hansamu! Purasuma-dan no Inbō!!" (Japanese: アクロマVSハンサム！プラズマ団の陰謀！！)	February 7, 2013	May 11, 2013
When Team Plasma scientist Colress uses his machine to draw out Pokémon strength, the controlled wild Pokémon attack the residents of nearby Floccesy Town. Ash, Iris, and Cilan get caught in the middle of the mayhem when Pikachu and Axew also fall under his control, but when they are saved by Looker, they agree to aid him in his investigation of Team Plasma and Colress's scheme.
772	766	16	"The Light of Floccesy Ranch!" (The Fog of Sangi Ranch! Denryu's Light!!); Transliteration: "Kiri no Sangi Bokujō! Denryū no Akari!!" (Japanese: 霧のサンギ牧場！デンリュウのあかり！！)	February 14, 2013	May 18, 2013
While stopping at Floccesy Ranch, Iris's Dragonite helps rancher Elly's Ampharos get into the fighting spirit.
773	767	17	"Saving Braviary!" (N Returns! Warrgle Rescue Mission!!); Transliteration: "Enu Futatabi! Wōguru Kyūshutsu Sakusen!!" (Japanese: N再び！ウォーグル救出作戦！！)	February 21, 2013	May 25, 2013
Ash and friends once again run into N, who has freed a Braviary held captive by Team Plasma. They help him bring it to a Pokémon Center, but when Braviary is tracked by a pair of Team Plasma Grunts - Nero and Bianco, who respectively use a Seviper and Zangoose in battle - N puts his life on the line. Successfully freeing Braviary, N joins the group on their journey to the White Ruins.
774	768	18	"The Pokémon Harbor Patrol!" (Hurry Up! The Pokémon Coastal Rescue Team!!); Transliteration: "Isoge! Pokemon Wangan Kyūjotai!!" (Japanese: 急げ！ポケモン湾岸救助隊！！)	February 28, 2013	June 1, 2013
Upon returning to Virbank City, Ash and friends meet Halsey who runs a rescue team consisting of his two Frillish, his Dewott, and his Watchog. Making his personal feelings on the idea of Pokémon putting themselves at risk for the sake of humans known, N's belief that Watchog (who seems ill-suited for the Team's risky endeavours) is being used as a tool causes an ideological clash between Halsey and N, but the two young men must put their enmities aside when a fire breaks out in Virbank City's Industrial Complex.
775	769	19	"The Fires of a Red-Hot Reunion!" (Burn, Lizardon! Vs. Kairyu!); Transliteration: "Moe yo Rizādon! Bui Esu Kairyū!" (Japanese: 燃えよリザードン！VSカイリュー！)	March 7, 2013	June 8, 2013
Ash and his friends come across the Kanto Fair, and seeing a Charmander perform on stage reminds him of his old friend, Charizard. He tells Iris, Cilan and N about his and Charizard's history, and everyone agrees that Ash should reunite with Charizard. Professor Oak sends Charizard over, and after he meets Iris' Dragonite, the two trainers agree to have a friendly match.
776	770	20	"Team Plasma's Pokémon Manipulation!" (Team Plasma's Ambitions! Manipulated Pokémon!!); Transliteration: "Purazuma-dan no Yabō! Ayatsurareta Pokemon-tachi!!" (Japanese: プラズマ団の野望！操られたポケモンたち！！)	March 14, 2013	June 15, 2013
Colress appears and tests his newly-advanced machine on Dragon-type Pokémon - first taking over a young trainer's Haxorus, and later Iris's Dragonite. As Ash and Charizard try to stop them, N puts himself in the crossfire, knowing that Pokémon should be friends and not fight each other.
777	771	21	"Secrets From Out of the Fog!" (N's Secret... Beyond the Fog!); Transliteration: "Enu no Himitsu... Kiri no Kanata ni!" (Japanese: Nの秘密…霧の彼方に！)	March 21, 2013	June 22, 2013
After N is hurt by Colress's machine, two young women, Anthea and Concordia, come to save him. N then tells Ash and the others the truth about his life, including his link to the evil Team Plasma's boss Ghetsis.
778	772	22	"Meowth, Colress and Team Rivalry!" (Team Rocket vs. Team Plasma! Nyarth and Achroma!!); Transliteration: "Roketto-dan tai Purazuma-dan! Nyāsu to Akuroma!!" (Japanese: ロケット団VSプラズマ団！ニャースとアクロマ！！)	March 28, 2013	June 29, 2013
Team Plasma's Colress convinces Meowth from Team Rocket to use his technology on him to make him stronger, but it is all part of Colress's plans to test his Pokémon controlling device. Meanwhile, Ash's Pignite is having trouble using Flamethrower because there is something lodged in its nose. After several failed attempts to unblock Pignite's nose, Iris tries tickling it with a blade of grass, and Pignite sneezes out the culprit: a shell from Pansage's Bullet Seed attack (which had backfired onto Pignite during the earlier battle with Team Plasma)!
779	773	23	"Ash and N: A Clash of Ideals!" (The White Ruins! Satoshi Against N!!); Transliteration: "Shiro no Iseki! Satoshi tai Enu!!" (Japanese: 白の遺跡！サトシ対N！！)	April 4, 2013	July 6, 2013
At the ruins dedicated to the Pokémon Reshiram, N steals the Light Stone from Cedric Juniper, and Ash's attempt to stop him ends with them separated from the others. Team Plasma moves to attack the White Ruins while Team Rocket watches on in anticipation, and Iris, Cilan and Looker attempt to fight off the enemy forces.
780	774	24	"Team Plasma and the Awakening Ceremony!" (Team Plasma Attacks! The Resurrection Ceremony!!); Transliteration: "Purazuma-dan Shūgeki! Fukkatsu no Gishiki!!" (Japanese: プラズマ団襲撃！復活の儀式！！)	April 11, 2013	July 13, 2013
Ash and N prepare to save Iris, Cilan, and Professor Juniper's father from the clutches of Team Plasma before Ghetsis can revive Reshiram, but their attempts to fight back are hampered by Colress's Pokémon controlling machine, forcing them all to call back their Pokémon. Pikachu gets hit by the machine's beam, which sways N into surrendering the Light Stone in exchange for its freedom just as Ghetsis arrives who is ready to begin the ritual.
781	775	25	"What Lies Beyond Truth and Ideals!" (Reshiram Against N! Beyond Ideals and Truth!!); Transliteration: "Reshiramu tai Enu! Risō to Shinjitsu no Kanata e!!" (Japanese: レシラム対N！理想と真実の彼方へ！！)	April 18, 2013	July 20, 2013
As the revived Reshiram quickly falls under Ghetsis' control, Ash and friends try to develop a strategy to stop Team Plasma. Looker convinces Team Rocket to help in the fight against the villains, while Ash and Pikachu aim to destroy the controlling machine. N hopes to pacify the enraged Reshiram before it destroys the world in a righteous fury, which is akin to when it burned down Team Plasma's castle in the past.
Pokémon: Black & White: Adventures in Unova and Beyond
782	776	26	"Farewell, Unova! Setting Sail for New Adventures!" (Farewell Isshu! A New Journey Sets Sail!!); Transliteration: "Saraba Isshu! Aratanaru Funade!!" (Japanese: さらばイッシュ！新たなる船出！！)	April 25, 2013	July 27, 2013
With Team Plasma defeated, Ash decides it is time to go back to Kanto. Iris and Cilan decide to go with him to further their skills and Professor Juniper charters all of them a cruise through the Decolore Islands on a boat with a mysterious crew. Once settled in their cabins, however, Ash finds that they are locked in and their Pokémon are not with them, and learns that was Team Rocket's work.
783	777	27	"Danger, Sweet as Honey!" (Sweet Honey Is Full of Danger!); Transliteration: "Amai Hanīmitsu ni wa Kiken ga Ippai!" (Japanese: 甘いハニーミツには危険がいっぱい！)	May 2, 2013	August 3, 2013
The cruise makes a stop on Honey Island, known for its colonies of the Honeycomb Pokémon Combee, Pupa Pokémon Kakuna, Stinger Pokémon Beedrill, and its honey-flavored cuisine.
784	778	28	"Cilan and the Case of the Purrloin Witness!" (Sommelier Detective Dent! The Secret Room on the Open Seas!!); Transliteration: "Somurie Tantei Dento! Daikaigen no Misshitsu!!" (Japanese: ソムリエ探偵デント！大海原の密室！！)	May 9, 2013	August 10, 2013
As Ash and his friends prepare for the upcoming Marine Cup Tournament on board their new cruise ship, the group learns that Mrs. Ripple, a jewel collector, will display her collection after the tournament, but upon the tournament's conclusion she discovers that her rare Eye of Liepard has been stolen. Cilan decides to investigate.
785	779	29	"Crowning the Scalchop King!" (Farewell Mijumaru!? The Path to Be Hotachi King!); Transliteration: "Saraba Mijumaru!? Hotachi Kingu e no Michi!" (Japanese: さらばミジュマル！？ホタチキングへの道！)	May 16, 2013	August 17, 2013
On Scalchop Island, Ash's Oshawott goes up against the Dewott named Caesar to see who will win the battle at the Scalchop King Competition.
786	780	30	"The Island of Illusions!" (Illusion Island! The Zoroark in the Fog!!); Transliteration: "Gen'ei no Shima! Kiri no Naka no Zoroāku!!" (Japanese: 幻影の島！霧の中のゾロアーク！！)	May 23, 2013	August 24, 2013
On the way to Mahora Island, the gang's boat passes through fog and they believe they see a familiar shape in it. After avoiding a giant Heatmor when Pikachu's attacks do not work against it, Axew gets poisoned by a Foongus's Mushroom Spore attack, forcing the gang to take him to an old Pokémon Center, which they soon discover is operating illegally.
787	781	31	"To Catch a Rotom!" (Rotom vs. Professor Ōkido!); Transliteration: "Rotomu Bui Esu Ōkido-hakase!" (Japanese: ロトムVSオーキド博士！)	May 30, 2013	August 31, 2013
Ash, Iris, and Cilan catch up with Professor Oak who has come to one of the Decolore Islands to investigate the Plasma Pokémon Rotom and its Forme Change capabilities. However, the Rotom native to the island are more interested in Pikachu, Emolga, and Stunfisk.
788	782	32	"The Pirates of Decolore!" (Pirate King of the Dekorora Islands!); Transliteration: "Dekorora Shotō no Kaizoku Ō!" (Japanese: デコロラ諸島の海賊王！)	June 6, 2013	September 7, 2013
When Team Rocket tries to ransack the group's cruise ship's food store, they are thwarted by a group of self-styled pirate Pokémon group made up of a Croconaw, an Octillery, an Azumarill, and a Ducklett, leaving Ash to try to get the food back.
789	783	33	"Butterfree and Me!" (Satoshi and Butterfree! Until We Meet Again!!); Transliteration: "Satoshi to Batafurī! Mata Au Hi made!!" (Japanese: サトシとバタフリー！また会う日まで！！)	June 13, 2013	September 14, 2013
On Wayfarer Island, Ash and his friends see the native Metapod and Butterfree, and when they find a Caterpie who has not yet evolved, Ash takes it upon himself to help the very lazy Pokémon join the rest of its friends, remembering the times he had raising his own Butterfree a long time ago.
790	784	34	"The Path That Leads to Goodbye!" (Satoshi and Iris No Longer Friends!? The Single Path of Separation!!); Transliteration: "Satoshi to Airisu ga Zekkō!? Wakare no Ippon-michi!!" (Japanese: サトシとアイリスが絶交！？別れの1本道！！)	June 20, 2013	September 21, 2013
On Capacia Island, after Ash fails to capture a Dunsparce that has hurt Axew, Iris gets so mad at him that she says she will no longer be Ash's friend and leaves.
791	785	35	"Searching for a Wish!" (Make a Wish on Jirachi! The Seven-Day Miracle!!); Transliteration: "Jirāchi ni Negai o! Nanokakan no Kiseki!!" (Japanese: ジラーチに願いを！七日間の奇跡！！)	June 27, 2013	September 28, 2013
Ash, Iris, and Cilan take a break on Capacia Island only to discover they have arrived on the one week once every 1000 years when Jirachi awakens and grants a wish. Gemma, a young girl who lives on the island, wants to ask Jirachi to bring prosperity back to the island, but Team Rocket has other plans.
792	786	36	"Capacia Island UFO!" (The Shining Flying Saucer! The Town of Ohbem!!); Transliteration: "Hikaru Enban! Ōbemu-tachi no Machi!!" (Japanese: 光る円盤！オーベムたちの街！！)	July 4, 2013	October 5, 2013
Ash and Team Rocket must find a way to stop Beheeyem from taking over a town on Capacia Island after the townspeople, Iris and Cilan are placed under the strange Pokémons' control.
793	787	37	"The Journalist from Another Region!" (Pansy Appears! Erikiteru and Gogoat!!); Transliteration: "Panjī Tōjō! Erikiteru to Gōgōto!!" (Japanese: パンジー登場！エリキテルとゴーゴート！！)	July 18, 2013	October 12, 2013
While on Harvest Island, Ash and his friends meet the Pokémon Reporter Alexa, who has come all the way from the Kalos Region with her Gogoat and Helioptile. She has come to investigate Harvest Island's fruit harvest festival, which the others realize has a Pokémon Sumo tournament. Ash, Iris, and Cilan enter Pignite, Dragonite, and Pansage in the tournament to win the grand prize, which is a Focus Band.
794	788	38	"Mystery on a Deserted Island!" (The Mystery of the Treasure! Desert Island Adventure!!); Transliteration: "Otakara no Nazo! Mujintō Adobenchā!!" (Japanese: お宝の謎！無人島アドベンチャー！！)	July 25, 2013	October 19, 2013
Alexa tells Ash, Iris, and Cilan about Frond Island, a desert island where a pirate ship crashed years ago, and the ship's treasure has never been found. The group decides to investigate, and Team Rocket follows to get the treasure for themselves.
795	789	39	"A Pokémon of a Different Color!" (Ibuki and Iris! The Different Colored Crimgan!!); Transliteration: "Ibuki to Airisu! Irochigai Kurimugan!!" (Japanese: イブキとアイリス！色ちがいクリムガン！！)	August 1, 2013	October 26, 2013
On Cave Island, Ash and his friends meet up with Clair, Gym Leader of Johto's Blackthorn City Gym, who has come to the island to capture a different-colored Druddigon, but her Dragonite left without her. When they find her Dragonite, Iris's Dragonite takes an instant dislike to it and the two fight, hampering Clair's plans to find the different-colored Druddigon on the other side of the island from the port.
796	790	40	"Celebrating the Hero's Comet!" (Onvern Appears! The Legend of the Comet and the Hero!!); Transliteration: "Onbān Tōjō! Suisei to Yūsha no Densetsu!!" (Japanese: オンバーン登場！彗星と勇者の伝説！！)	August 15, 2013	November 2, 2013
The appearance of Woodate Comet approaches, so Ash, Iris, Cilan, and Alexa go stake out the ruins where the legendary hero it is named after first spotted it. However, they must deal with several Ghost Pokémon and Team Rocket who are once again trying to capture Pikachu.
797	791	41	"Go, Go, Gogoat!" (Go Go Gogoat!); Transliteration: "Gō Gō Gōgōto!" (Japanese: ゴーゴーゴーゴート！)	August 22, 2013	November 9, 2013
On another island, Ash, Iris, Cilan, and Alexa meet a boy named Tony who touches Alexa's Gogoat's horns, causing it to temporarily bond with him. They all help Tony meet his father on the other side of the island.
798	792	42	"Team Rocket's Shocking Recruit!" (Emonga Joins Team Rocket!); Transliteration: "Emonga, Rokketo-dan ni Hairu!" (Japanese: エモンガ、ロケット団に入る！)	September 5, 2013	November 16, 2013
After being scolded by Iris, an ambush by Team Rocket starts to make Emolga wish she did not have to be with such strict trainers and fights on Team Rocket's side.
799	793	43	"Survival of the Striaton Gym!" (Dent vs. the Icy Challenger! The San'yō Gym in Danger!!); Transliteration: "Dento Bui Esu Kōri no Chōsensha! San'yō Jimu no Kiki!!" (Japanese: デントVS氷の挑戦者！サンヨウジムの危機！！)	September 12, 2013	November 23, 2013
Chili and Cress meet up with Cilan on Paladin Island as they have both been beaten by a challenger at the Striaton Gym named Morana who exclusively uses Ice-type Pokémon such as Mamoswine and Glalie. It is up to Cilan and Pansage to face off against Morana and her Abomasnow for the honor of the Striaton City Gym.
800	794	44	"Best Wishes Until We Meet Again!" (Best Wishes! Until the Day We Meet Again!!); Transliteration: "Besuto Uisshu! Mata Au Hi made!!" (Japanese: ベストウイッシュ！また会う日まで！！)	September 19, 2013	November 30, 2013
The group finally reaches the waters off of Kanto, just as Team Rocket once again tries to do their best to take Ash's Pikachu. After heading them off for the final time, Iris and Cilan decide to stop traveling with Ash and go their own ways.
801	795	45	"The Dream Continues!" (My Dream, Pokémon Master!!); Transliteration: "Ore no Yume, Pokemon Masutā!!" (Japanese: オレの夢、ポケモンマスター！！)	September 26, 2013	December 7, 2013
With Iris and Cilan heading off on their own adventures in Johto, Ash is restless and still wishes to become a Pokémon Master. To that end, Alexa suggests that he travels with her back to her home in the Kalos region just as Team Rocket hatches another plan to steal Pikachu.

=== Special episodes ===
Jap. overall	Eng. overall	No. in season	English title Japanese title	Original release date	English air date
—	—	—	"Mewtwo — Prologue to Awakening" (Myūtsū: The Prologue to its Awakening); Transliteration: "Myūtsū ~Kakusei e no Purorōgu~" (Japanese: ミュウツー ～覚醒への序章（プロローグ）～)	July 11, 2013	January 11, 2014
After a mission, Virgil crashes in the mountains to meet a group of people who claim they have been saved from danger by the Legendary Pokémon Mewtwo. However, one member of the group seems to have his intent on capturing the rare Pokémon. Note: It is a special episode that serves as a prologue to Pokémon the Movie: Genesect and the Legend Awakened.
SP–3	—	SP–1	"Dent and Takashi! Gyarados's Outrage!!" (Note: These episodes are labeled as "extra episodes" in Japan, but were broadcast under the Decolora Adventures title and are included within this season.); Transliteration: "Dento to Takeshi! Gyaradosu no Gekirin!!" (Japanese: デントとタケシ！ギャラドスのげきりん！！)	October 3, 2013	—
After bidding farewell to Satoshi and Iris, Dent goes fishing at a lake in Johto only to reel in a Gyarados that hurts his Yanappu during battle. When he heads to the local Pokémon Center, he meets up with a Pokémon Doctor named Takashi, although neither of them know that they both know Satoshi.
SP–4	—	SP–2	"Iris vs. Ibuki! The Path to Becoming a Dragon Master!!"; Transliteration: "Airisu Bui Esu Ibuki! Doragon Masutā e no Michi!!" (Japanese: アイリスVSイブキ！ドラゴンマスターへの道！！)	March 27, 2014	—
Iris heads to Fusube City to meet up with Ibuki once again to have a battle. On the way to meet Ibuki, she befriends and helps a Fukamaru which Iris considers capturing.

== Music ==
The Japanese opening songs are "Be an Arrow!" (やじるしになって!, Yajirushi ni Natte!), "Be an Arrow! 2013" (やじるしになって! 2013, Yajirushi ni Natte! 2013) by Rica Matsumoto and "Summerly Slope" (夏めく 坂道, Natsumeku Sakamichi) by Daisuke. The ending songs are the ending theme song of the lead-in short for the movie, Pokémon the Movie: Kyurem vs. the Sword of Justice, Meloetta's Moonlight Serenade, "Look Look☆Here" (みてみて☆こっちっち, Mite Mite☆Kotchitchi) by Momoiro Clover Z (桃色黒羽ゼット) to promote the short, "Sakura Go-Round" (サクラ・ゴーラウンド, Sakura Gō-Raundo) by Shiritsu Ebisu Chugaku (チュ学私立恵比寿), "Let's Join Hands" the ending theme song of the lead-in short for the movie, Pokémon the Movie: Genesect and the Legend Awakened, Pikachu & Eevee☆Friends, (手をつなごぅ, "Te o Tsunagō") by Shiritsu Ebisu Chugaku (私立恵比寿中学) to promote the short, "X Strait, Y Scenery" (X海峡Y景色, Ekkusu Kaikyō Wai Keshiki; "X-Kaikyō, Y-Keshiki") (from Pokémon The Series: XY) performed by J☆Dee'Z during the second Black & White anime special episode, and the English opening song is "It's Always You and Me" by Neal Coomer and Kathryn Raio. Its instrumental version serves as the ending theme.

== Home media releases ==
Viz Media and Warner Home Video released the entire series on a single 4-disc boxset on DVD in the United States on September 23, 2014, and March 24, 2015.

Viz Media and Warner Home Video released Pokémon: Black & White: Adventures in Unova and Beyond – The Complete Season on DVD on February 21, 2023.
