= Checkfield =

American eclectic music ensemble

Checkfield is an American eclectic music ensemble from San Diego, whose style skilfully blends various genres, notably folk, classical, pop and electronica, though their music is commonly mis-categorised as New Age.

Checkfield was founded by Ron Satterfield and John Archer, who first met in 1970 at Mesa College. They reunited to work together in 1977, making home recordings and playing live locally. They released their first album, Spirit, in 1982, and then signed to American Gramaphone, who released four albums between 1986 and 1992. The most commercially successful of these was A View from the Edge (1990), which hit #15 on the Billboard Top New Age Albums chart. They released a retrospective on the Gallery label in 1997.

== Discography ==
- 1982 - Spirit - (Pausa)
- 1986 - Water, Wind and Stone (American Gramaphone)
- 1987 - Distant Thunder (American Gramaphone)
- 1988 - Through the Lens (American Gramaphone)
- 1990 - A View from the Edge (American Gramaphone)
- 1997 - Reflections on a Decade (Gallery)
- 1998 - Music from Everglades National Park (Gallery)
- 1998 - Vistas (LiquidTrax)
- 2003 - Surrounded (American Gramaphone)

== Singles & EP's ==
- 1987 - Spring Dance - (American Gramaphone)
