= Distant Thunder (Upstairs, Downstairs) =

- Upstairs, Downstairs episode
- Episode no.: Season 3 Episode 12
- Directed by: Bill Bain
- Written by: Alfred Shaughnessy
- Original air date: 12 January 1974

Episode chronology
← Previous "A Perfect Stranger"	Next → "The Sudden Storm"

"Distant Thunder" is the twelfth episode of the third series of the British television series, Upstairs, Downstairs. The episode is set in 1914.

== Plot ==
In the early months of 1914, Hazel suffers a miscarriage which sends her into an extended depression. She struggles emotionally and besides the feeling of loss, a lack of understanding affects Hazel. The subject is too painful, causing feelings of isolation by Hazel and James, who falls in love with his step-cousin, Georgina Worsley, taking her to a Regimental ball. This causes James' father, Richard Bellamy, to criticize James, who asks his father to move out of the house. The class divide between James and Hazel causes again conflicts with the Bellamys' staff and in the marriage. Hazel is particularly close to Richard and Rose, but Hudson never truly accepts her, a middle-class woman, as mistress of the house. Hazel and James's marriage seems to have come to an end.
