= Tamurapan =

Japanese pop songwriter and singer (born 1980)

- Born: Tamura Ayumi (田村歩美); 9 August 1980 (age 45); Takayama, Gifu, Japan
- Genres: Pop
- Occupations: Singer, Songwriter, Musician, arranger
- Instruments: Vocals, multi-instrumentalist
- Years active: 2002–present
- Labels: Vitality Records, Columbia
- Website: http://www.tamurapan.com/

Tamurapan (たむらぱん) is a Japanese pop songwriter and singer. Her real name is Tamura Ayumi (田村歩美), was born in 1980 in Takayama, Gifu, Japan. The name Tamurapan is a combination of her surname: Tamura (田村) and the French word for rabbit: Lapin.

During the first years of elementary school she lived in Taiwan for some time, while she was still in elementary school she got her amateur radio license.

== Discography ==
In 2002 Tamurapan started her music career doing mainly live shows. In 2007 with the advancement of Myspace in Japan, she started publishing her music on the site. Around the same time she got a limited release of the single: Semenaidei-heiyō meiyō (「責めないデイ」-「ヘイヨーメイヨー」)

She is the first Japanese singer-songwriter to make the move from Myspace to a major label company Columbia Music.

=== Limited Release Singles ===
	Release Date	Title	Japanese
1st	October 10, 2007	Semenaidei	責めないデイ
2nd	October 10, 2007	heiyō meiyō	ヘイヨーメイヨー
3rd	November 7, 2007	omaebutadana~okurametegami~	お前ぶただな～送らぬ手紙～
4th	November 7, 2007	A Million	アミリオン
5th	December 5, 2007	Kaitenmokuba	回転木馬
6th	December 5, 2007	rai・kua・bādo	ライ・クア・バード
7th	January 23, 2008	buttobasuzo	ぶっ飛ばすぞ
8th	February 20, 2008	hebun	へぶん
9th	March 19, 2008	Hollywood	ハリウッド
10th	May 13, 2009	ookimishōnennotēmu	オオカミ少年ケンのテーマ（Lotte「Fit's」CM Song）

=== Albums ===
==== Independent Album ====
	Release Date	Title	Japanese
1st	March, 2003	Tamurapan	たむらぱん

==== Mini albums ====
	Release Date	Title	Japanese
1st	December 17, 2003	Alone at Play	ひとりあそび
2nd	January 12, 2005	Hitonoiruha	人のいろは
3rd	April 4, 2007	Harou	ハロウ

==== Albums ====
	Release Date	Title	Japanese
1st	April 23, 2008	butabesto	ブタベスト
2nd	June 3, 2009	nouniusoun	ノウニウノウン
3rd	December 15, 2010	nakunai	ナクナイ
4th	January 18, 2012	mitaina	mitaina
5th	October 24, 2012	worldwide	worldwide
6th	December 18, 2013	love and pain	love and pain

=== Singles ===
	Release Date	Title	Japanese
1st	July 23, 2008	Harēshon	ハレーション
2nd	November 12, 2008	Zero	ゼロ
3rd	March 18, 2009	charinco / chodoii tokoni itai	ちゃりんこ / ちょうどいいとこにいたい
4th	February 2, 2010	bamboo / mountain	バンブー / マウンテン
5th	July 21, 2010	SOS	SOS
6th	October 20, 2010	rough	ラフ
