= Deaths in April 2017 =

The following is a list of notable deaths in April 2017.

Entries for each day are listed alphabetically by surname. A typical entry lists information in the following sequence:

- Name, age, country of citizenship at birth, subsequent country of citizenship (if applicable), reason for notability, cause of death (if known), and reference.

== April 2017 ==
=== 1 ===
- Talaat al-Shayeb, 74, Egyptian author, translator and intellectual.
- Sharon Ambrose, 77, American politician, member of the Council of the District of Columbia (1997–2007).
- Alberto Assirelli, 80, Italian cyclist.
- Gary Austin, 75, American theatre writer and director (The Groundlings), lung cancer.
- Parv Bancil, 50, British playwright.
- Lonnie Brooks, 83, American blues guitarist and singer.
- Antonio Ciliberti, 82, Italian Roman Catholic prelate, Bishop of Locri-Gerace (1988–1993), Archbishop of Matera-Irsina (1993–2003) and Catanzaro-Squillace (2003–2011).
- Bob Cunningham, 82, American jazz bassist.
- Gösta Ekman, 77, Swedish actor and director (Jönssonligan, Martin Beck).
- Nelson Elliott, 91, Canadian politician.
- Darcus Howe, 74, Trinidadian-born British civil rights activist, member of the Mangrove Nine.
- Ikutaro Kakehashi, 87, Japanese engineer and entrepreneur, founder of Ace Tone and Roland Corporation.
- Kim Jong-gil, 90, South Korean poet.
- Frederick Bernard Lacey, 96, American jurist, U.S. Attorney (1969–1971) and judge for the District Court for the District of New Jersey (1971–1986).
- Harold Lambert, 90, British physician.
- Antonio Lamela, 90, Spanish architect (Torres de Colón, Santiago Bernabéu Stadium, Adolfo Suárez Madrid–Barajas Airport).
- Sir Peter Lawler, 96, Australian public servant and diplomat, Secretary of the Department of Administrative Services (1975–1983), Ambassador to the Holy See and Ireland.
- Stuart Markland, 69, Scottish footballer (Berwick Rangers, Dundee United, Montrose).
- Wycliffe Noble, 91, British architect and musician (The Joystrings).
- Ray Pelfrey, 89, American football player (Green Bay Packers), complications from hip surgery.
- William Pinch, 76, American mineralogist.
- Louis Sarno, 62, American musicologist and author, liver disease.
- Philip L. Townes, 90, American physician.
- Shigeaki Uno, 86, Japanese political scientist.
- Burton Watson, 91, American translator.
- Yevgeny Yevtushenko, 84, Russian poet (Babi Yar).

=== 2 ===
- Sam Ard, 78, American racecar driver.
- Stan Beal, 92, Australian football player.
- Vivienne de Silva Boralessa, 86, Sri Lankan singer.
- Ken Donnelly, 66, American politician, member of the Massachusetts State Senate (since 2009), complications from a brain tumor.
- André Drouin, 70, Canadian politician, cancer.
- Alma Delia Fuentes, 80, Mexican actress.
- Hate Man, 80, American writer, heart failure.
- Ravi Jayewardene, 80, Sri Lankan army officer and Olympic sports shooter (1964).
- Rhubarb Jones, 65, American country disc jockey and professional wrestling ring announcer (WCW), heart attack.
- Leonard Litwin, 102, American real estate developer.
- Rafael Molina Morillo, 87, Dominican newspaper editor and diplomat.
- Konrad Repgen, 93, German historian.
- Michèle Rosier, 86, French fashion designer, film director, documentary maker and screenwriter.
- Julio Rotemberg, 63, Argentine-born American economist, cancer.
- Gerard Washnitzer, 90, American mathematician.
- D. B. H. Wildish, 102, British Royal Navy vice admiral.
- Jeremy Wilson, 72, British editor, publisher and writer.

=== 3 ===
- Kishori Amonkar, 84, Indian classical singer.
- Michel Arrivé, 80, French linguist and novelist.
- Bruno Burrini, 85, Italian Olympic alpine skier.
- John Chrispinsson, 60, Swedish journalist, heart attack.
- John Cockburn, 79, British test pilot.
- Azim Daudpota, 83, Pakistani military officer and politician, Commander of the Air Force of Zimbabwe (1983–1986), Governor of Sindh (1999–2000).
- Abraham S. Fischler, 89, American academic, President of Nova Southeastern University (1970–1992).
- Davuldena Gnanissara Thero, 101, Sri Lankan Buddhist monk, Supreme Mahanayaka of Amarapura Nikaya.
- Sergio González Rodríguez, 67, Mexican journalist, heart attack.
- Leif Klette, 89, Norwegian Olympic fencer (1952, 1960).
- John T. Knox, 92, American politician, member of the California State Assembly (1960–1980).
- Denis Mahony, 88, Irish Gaelic footballer (Dublin).
- Tomairangi Paki, 64, New Zealand Māori kapa haka leader.
- Bruce Palmer, 81, New Zealand lawyer and jurist.
- Enrico Quarantelli, 92, American sociologist.
- Kathleen Ridder, 94, American philanthropist, educator, writer, and equality for women activist.
- Arnold Scheibel, 94, American neuroscientist.
- Roy Sievers, 90, American baseball player (St. Louis Browns, Washington Senators, Chicago White Sox).
- Thomas Tackaberry, 93, American military officer.
- Gary W. Thomas, 79, American judge.
- Bill Tinnock, 86, New Zealand Olympic rower (1952), British Empire Games silver medalist (1950, 1954).
- Stella Turk, 92, British zoologist, naturalist, and conservationist.
- Eva von Gamm, 84, German figure skater.
- William Walaska, 71, American politician, member of the Rhode Island Senate (1995–2017), cancer.

=== 4 ===
- Tobias Barry, 92, American politician, member of the Illinois House of Representatives (1960–1974).
- Samir Farid, 73, Egyptian film critic.
- Clóvis Frainer, 86, Brazilian Roman Catholic prelate, Archbishop of Manaus (1985–1991) and Juiz de Fora (1991–2001).
- Don Maddison, 90, English footballer (Berwick Rangers).
- George Mostow, 93, American mathematician.
- Mária Pozsonec, 77, Slovenian politician, MP (1990–2008).
- Raymond Reisser, 85, French racing cyclist.
- Giovanni Sartori, 92, Italian political scientist and journalist (Corriere della Sera), throat cancer.
- Frank Schepke, 81, German rower, Olympic champion (1960).
- Karl Stotz, 90, Austrian football player and manager.
- Fernand Tardy, 97, French soldier, politician, and author.
- Mike Taylor, 82, British racing driver, cancer.

=== 5 ===
- Attilio Benfatto, 74, Italian bicycle racer, world championship bronze medalist (1966).
- Arthur Bisguier, 87, American chess grandmaster and writer, respiratory failure.
- John Chittick, 69, American HIV/AIDS activist.
- Paul G. Comba, 91, Italian-American computer scientist and astronomer.
- Walter de Camp, 70, Finnish writer.
- David Gove, 38, American ice hockey player (Carolina Hurricanes) and coach (Wheeling Nailers), heroin overdose.
- Huang Yi, 65, Hong Kong author, stroke.
- Ryo Kagawa, 69, Japanese folk singer, leukemia.
- Margaret Kenyatta, 89, Kenyan politician and diplomat, mayor of Nairobi (1970–1976).
- Alma Soller McLay, 97, American stenographer (Nuremberg trials).
- Bernard Millant, 87, French bow maker, archetier and luthier.
- Hans Heinz Moser, 80, Swiss actor (Grounding).
- Paul O'Neill, 61, American producer, composer and songwriter (Savatage, Trans-Siberian Orchestra), prescription medication reaction.
- Makoto Ōoka, 86, Japanese poet and literary critic.
- María Luisa Ozaita, 77, Spanish composer.
- Tim Parnell, 84, British racing driver (Formula One).
- Memè Perlini, 69, Italian actor and director (A Fistful of Dynamite, The Grand Duel), suicide by defenestration.
- Joe Murray Rivers, 78, American businessman and transit advocate.
- Steve Sandor, 79, American actor (Fire and Ice, Stryker, Star Trek).
- Atanase Sciotnic, 75, Romanian sprint canoeist, Olympic silver medalist (1972).
- Ameer Bux Shar, 56, Pakistani author.
- Dennis Shaw, 86, English cricketer (Warwickshire).
- Ilkka Sinisalo, 58, Finnish ice hockey player (Philadelphia Flyers, HIFK, Los Angeles Kings), prostate cancer.
- Theodore J. Smayda, 85, American oceanographer.
- George Snyder, 88, American politician, member of the Maryland Senate (1959–1974).
- Helen Szamuely, 66, Russian-born British political activist.

=== 6 ===
- John Anslow, 81, New Zealand Olympic field hockey player.
- Stan Anslow, 85, English footballer (Millwall).
- Frank Attkisson, 61, American politician, member of the Florida House of Representatives (2000–2008), Mayor of Kissimmee, Florida (1996–2000), traffic collision.
- Gordon Carton, 95, Canadian politician, Ontario MPP (1963–1975).
- Bob Cerv, 91, American baseball player (New York Yankees, Kansas City Athletics).
- John Fraser, 82, British politician, MP (1966–1997).
- Ronald Gatski, 82, American politician.
- Armand Gatti, 93, Monégasque-born French playwright, poet and journalist.
- Libuše Havelková, 92, Czech actress (Closely Watched Trains) and educator, Vice-Dean of Faculty of Theatre in Prague.
- Newton Holanda Gurgel, 93, Brazilian Roman Catholic prelate, Bishop of Crato (1993–2001).
- Robin Hopper, 77, British-born Canadian ceramicist and potter.
- Imperial Commander, 16, Irish racehorse, heart attack.
- Lashonda Lester, 41, American stand-up comedian.
- Michael McPartland, 77, British Roman Catholic priest.
- Bona Medeiros, 86, Brazilian politician, Governor of Piauí (1986–1987).
- Hugh Montgomery, 93, American intelligence officer.
- David Peel, 73, American singer and political activist, complications from a heart attack.
- Jack Pinoteau, 93, French film director.
- Don Rickles, 90, American comedian and actor (Toy Story, Casino, Kelly's Heroes), Emmy winner (2008), kidney failure.
- Rolf Sagen, 76, Norwegian author.
- Peter Savaryn, 90, Ukrainian-born Canadian lawyer.
- Clyde See, 75, American politician, member of the West Virginia House of Delegates (1974–1984).
- Jerzy Vetulani, 81, Polish neuroscientist.

=== 7 ===
- Alicia Agut, 87, Spanish actress, respiratory complications.
- Robert B. Baldwin, 93, American vice admiral.
- Joan Baker, 94, British painter.
- Relja Bašić, 87, Croatian actor (One Song a Day Takes Mischief Away).
- Arturo García Bustos, 90, Mexican painter.
- Sir Andy Chande, 88, Tanzanian executive and Freemason.
- Walter DeVerter, 81, American politician.
- Bill DuBois Sr., 100, American farmer and lobbyist.
- S. M. Ganapathy, 85, Indian temple architect and sculptor.
- John Glick, 78, American pottery artist.
- Marthe Gosteli, 99, Swiss women's rights activist, complications from a fall.
- Ray Guillery, 87, German-born British neuroscientist.
- Peter Isaacson, 96, Australian media publisher.
- Derrick Jensen, 60, American football player (Oakland Raiders), Super Bowl champion (1980, 1983), amyotrophic lateral sclerosis.
- Robin Kay, 97, New Zealand painter and historian.
- Patricia McKissack, 72, American children's writer.
- Christopher Morahan, 87, English stage and television director (The Jewel in the Crown).
- Mary Mumford, 15th Lady Herries of Terregles, 76, Scottish peeress.
- Glenn O'Brien, 70, American journalist and editor (Rolling Stone, Interview), complications from pneumonia.
- Craig Payne, 55, American boxer.
- Tim Pigott-Smith, 70, English actor (The Jewel in the Crown, Clash of the Titans, V for Vendetta), heart attack.
- John Salmon, 86, British advertising executive.
- Ben Speer, 86, American musician (Speer Family).
- Nicolae Șerban Tanașoca, 75, Romanian historian and philologist.
- Frans Widerberg, 82, Norwegian painter.

=== 8 ===
- Alicia Appleman-Jurman, 86, Polish-born Israeli-American memoirist.
- Stephen Caracappa, 75, American NYPD police detective and organized crime operative, cancer.
- Fishman, 66, Mexican professional wrestler (UWA, AAA, EMLL), heart attack.
- Teddy Getty Gaston, 103, American author and singer.
- Fabrizia Baduel Glorioso, 89, Italian politician and trade unionist, president of EESC (1978–1979), MEP (1979–1984).
- Georgy Grechko, 85, Russian cosmonaut, Hero of the Soviet Union, heart failure.
- Malcolm Hastie, 88, Australian Olympic water polo player.
- Ken Kranz, 93, American football player (Green Bay Packers).
- Eugene Lang, 98, American philanthropist.
- Brian Matthew, 88, English TV and radio presenter (Saturday Club, Thank Your Lucky Stars, Sounds of the 60s).
- Sir Douglas Myers, 78, New Zealand businessman (Lion Nathan), cancer.
- Vasantha Obeysekera, 79, Sri Lankan filmmaker.
- Rita Orlandi-Malaspina, 79, Italian opera singer.
- Guy O'Sullivan, 49, British-born Canadian reality television producer (Come Dine with Me Canada, MasterChef Canada, Canada's Worst Driver).
- Park Nam-ok, 94, South Korean film director.
- David Perry, 79, English rugby union player.
- Kim Plainfield, 63, American jazz drummer.
- Mehmoodur Rehman, 75, Indian academic administrator, Vice-Chancellor of Aligarh Muslim University, cardiac arrest.
- Donald Sarason, 84, American mathematician.
- Anri Volokhonsky, 81, Russian poet.

=== 9 ===
- Knut Borge, 67, Norwegian journalist and entertainer.
- Carme Chacón, 46, Spanish politician, Minister of Housing (2007–2008) and Defence (2008–2011), heart illness.
- John Clarke, 68, Australian-New Zealand satirist (Fred Dagg, The Games).
- Jonny Forsström, 73, Swedish artist.
- Richard Kenneth Fox, 91, American diplomat, United States Ambassador to Trinidad and Tobago (1977–1979).
- Peter Hansen, 95, American actor (When Worlds Collide, General Hospital, Dragonfly).
- Harry Huskey, 101, American computer scientist (ENIAC).
- Margarita Isabel, 75, Mexican actress (Cronos), emphysema.
- Kim Young-ae, 65, South Korean actress (The Attorney), pancreatic cancer.
- Dieter Kottysch, 73, German light middleweight boxer, Olympic gold medalist (1972).
- Édouard Le Jeune, 96, French Resistance member and senator.
- Anthony M. Massad, 88, American politician.
- Fouad Naffah, 92, Lebanese politician.
- Peter Par Jiek, South Sudanese military officer, shot.
- Jean Périmony, 86, French actor and theatre director.
- Stan Robinson, 80, British jazz tenor saxophonist and flautist.
- Giorgio Bàrberi Squarotti, 87, Italian literary critic.
- Gary Steigman, 76, American astrophysicist and astronomer, complications from a fall.
- Bill Sutherland, 82, Canadian ice hockey player (Philadelphia Flyers, St. Louis Blues, Winnipeg Jets).
- Jennette Williams, 64, American photographer, cancer.
- Bob Wootton, 75, American country guitarist (Johnny Cash, Tennessee Three).
- Paul A. Worlock, 85, American politician.
- Jean Worthley, 92, American naturalist and television presenter (Hodgepodge Lodge).

=== 10 ===
- Jack Ahearn, 92, Australian motorcycle road racer.
- Givi Berikashvili, 83, Georgian actor, respiratory failure.
- Al Besselink, 93, American professional golfer.
- Roland Blaesi, 85, Swiss Olympic alpine skier.
- Arthur James Boucot, 92, American paleontologist.
- Raymond Chang, 77, Hong Kong-born American chemist.
- Bab Christensen, 89, Norwegian actress.
- Sir Arnold Clark, 89, Scottish businessman (Arnold Clark Automobiles).
- Spike Dykes, 79, American football coach (Texas Tech Red Raiders), heart attack.
- Blossom Elfman, 91, American novelist.
- Jan Faiks, 71, American politician, member of the Alaska Senate (1983–1991) and president (1987–1989), brain cancer.
- Fred Furniss, 94, British footballer (Sheffield United F.C.).
- Michael Gannon, 89, American historian and academic.
- Linda Hopkins, 92, American actress (Purlie, Me and Bessie) and singer ("Shake a Hand"), Tony winner (1972).
- Dennis F. Kinlaw, 94, American academic, president of Asbury University (1968–81, 1986–91).
- Kirill Kovaldzhi, 87, Russian author.
- Vuk Kulenović, 70, Yugoslavian-born American composer.
- Charles Oakley, 85, American football player (Chicago Cardinals).
- David Parry-Jones, 83, Welsh TV presenter and writer (BBC), complications from Alzheimer's disease.
- Larry Reisbig, 77, American football player (Washington State Cougars) and coach (Long Beach State 49ers).
- Carlo Riva, 95, Italian motorboat designer.
- Larry Sharpe, 66, American professional wrestler (NWA) and trainer, liver disease.
- Margaret Towner, 96, British actress (Derek, Star Wars: Episode I – The Phantom Menace).

=== 11 ===
- Michael Ballhaus, 81, German cinematographer (Goodfellas, Air Force One, Broadcast News).
- Martin J. Beckmann, 92, German economist.
- Frederick H. Borsch, 81, American Episcopal prelate, Bishop of Los Angeles (1988–2002), myelodysplastic syndrome.
- Yehuda Efroni, 86, Israeli actor, cancer.
- Edward Francis, 86, Indian Roman Catholic prelate, Bishop of Sivagangai (1987–2005).
- Samir Frangieh, 71, Lebanese politician, MP (2005–2009), cancer.
- Albert Freedman, 95, American game show producer (Twenty-One).
- J. Geils, 71, American guitarist (The J. Geils Band).
- José Ramón Gurruchaga Ezama, 86, Spanish-born Peruvian Roman Catholic prelate, Bishop of Huaraz (1987–1996) and Lurin (1996–2006).
- Shantanu Kaiser, 62, Bangladeshi poet and essayist.
- Dorothy Mengering, 95, American television personality (Late Night with David Letterman, Late Show with David Letterman).
- Tom Modrak, 74, American sports executive (Philadelphia Eagles, Buffalo Bills), neurological disease.
- Chaïm Nissim, 68, Israeli-born Swiss anti-nuclear activist and politician, assisted suicide.
- Joyce Pipkin, 93, American football player.
- Margit Schumann, 64, German luger, Olympic gold medalist (1976).
- Jerrell Shofner, 88, American historian.
- Toby Smith, 46, British keyboardist (Jamiroquai), cancer.
- Mark Wainberg, 71, Canadian medical researcher, co-discoverer of lamivudine, asthma.

=== 12 ===
- Sheila Abdus-Salaam, 65, American judge, member of the New York Court of Appeals (since 2013), suicide by drowning.
- Ramesh Chandra Agarwal, 72, Indian newspaper publisher (Dainik Bhaskar), heart attack.
- Jean Bernabé, 75, French writer.
- Kathleen Cassello, 58, American operatic soprano.
- Ray Chamberlain, 87, American jazz guitarist.
- Tom Coyne, 62, American Grammy award-winning music engineer (21, 1989, 25), multiple myeloma.
- Akhilesh Das, 56, Indian politician and sporting executive, member of the Rajya Sabha (1996–2014), mayor of Lucknow (1993–1995), heart attack.
- Angel Espinosa, 50, Cuban Olympic boxer (1992), world amateur champion (1986).
- Tony Figueira, 57, Angolan-born Namibian photographer, multiple myeloma.
- Roy Forbes, 95, Canadian Olympic ice hockey player.
- William Norman Grigg, 54, American author, journalist, and libertarian activist, heart attack.
- Geoff Grover, 73, Australian footballer (Port Melbourne).
- Mufti Abdul Hannan, Bangladeshi terrorist, execution by hanging.
- Wayne Hardin, 91, American college football player (Pacific) and coach (Navy, Temple), stroke.
- Peggy Hayama, 83, Japanese singer, pneumonia.
- Santiago Isasi, 80, Spanish footballer (Real Zaragoza).
- Toshio Matsumoto, 85, Japanese film director (Funeral Parade of Roses), intestinal obstruction.
- Chimwala Munilall, 68, Guyanese cricketer.
- Charlie Murphy, 57, American comedian, actor, and screenwriter (Chappelle's Show, Norbit, The Boondocks), leukemia.
- Dara Quigley, 36, Irish journalist and blogger, suicide.

=== 13 ===
- Vic Barnhart, 94, American baseball player (Pittsburgh Pirates).
- Zareh Baronian, 75, Armenian theologian and abbot.
- K. S. Chandrasekharan, 96, Indian-Swiss mathematician.
- José Miguel Class, 78, Puerto Rican singer.
- Dennis Edwards Jr., 95, American judge (New York Supreme Court).
- Fred Goldsmith, 84, Australian VFL footballer (South Melbourne).
- Daniel Guice, 92, American politician, member of the Mississippi House of Representatives (1956–1960), mayor of Biloxi (1961–1973).
- Roger Highfield, 95, English historian.
- Nona Liddell, 89, British violinist.
- Robert Marta, 73, American film camera operator (The Jerk, Poltergeist II: The Other Side, The Golden Child), President of the Society of Operating Cameramen.
- David Mwiraria, 78, Kenyan politician, MP for North Imenti (1992–2007), Minister of Finance (2003–2006), bone cancer.
- Eric Pringle, 81, British scriptwriter and author.
- Vakhtang Rcheulishvili, 63, Georgian physicist, construction executive and politician, MP (1992–2003), cancer.
- Georges Rol, 90, French Roman Catholic prelate, Bishop of Angouleme (1975–1993).
- Dan Rooney, 84, American football executive and diplomat, Chairman of the Pittsburgh Steelers (since 2003), Ambassador to Ireland (2009–2012), member of the Hall of Fame (2000).
- Jim Scott, 78, American politician, member of the Virginia House of Delegates (1991–2013), complications from Alzheimer's disease.
- Norio Shioyama, 77, Japanese animation director (Inuyasha, Tiger Mask), fire.
- Robert Taylor, 85, American computer scientist and internet pioneer, recipient of the National Medal of Technology and the Draper Prize, complications from Parkinson's disease.
- Gary Thompson, 80, American politician.
- Imre Tóth, 68, Hungarian Olympic boxer.
- Ralph Votrian, 82, American actor.

=== 14 ===
- Robert H. Abel, 75, American author.
- Carol Cuffy-Dowlat, 59, Trinidadian politician and radio host, Senator (1995–2000).
- John Thomas Curtin, 95, American jurist, member of the U.S. District Court for Western New York (1967–1989).
- Martín Elías, 26, Colombian vallenato singer, traffic collision.
- Henry Hillman, 98, American venture capitalist and philanthropist.
- Hubertina D. Hogan, 92, American textile chemist.
- George William Jones, 79, British political scientist and author.
- Bruce Langhorne, 78, American folk musician (Bob Dylan) and film scorer (The Hired Hand), inspiration for "Mr. Tambourine Man", complications from a stroke.
- Bill Mitchell, 65, British theatre director, cancer.
- Hein-Direck Neu, 73, German Olympic discus thrower (1968, 1972, 1976).
- Hugh Pitts, 83, American football player.
- Stephen Pohlig, 64, American electrical engineer.
- Wilhelm Sachsenmaier, 90, Austrian Olympic sports shooter (1952, 1960).
- Girish Chandra Saxena, 89, Indian politician, Governor of Jammu and Kashmir (1990–1993, 1998–2003).
- James Smith, 97, Canadian politician, Commissioner of Yukon (1966–1976).
- Patti Smith, 70, American politician, member of the Oregon House of Representatives (2001–2009).
- Margery Wolf, 83, American anthropologist.
- John Woodburn, 80, British racing cyclist.

=== 15 ===
- David Brumbaugh, 56, American politician, member of the Oklahoma House of Representatives (since 2011).
- Johnny Carlyle, 87, Scottish ice hockey player (Nottingham Panthers).
- Alberto Carneiro, 79, Portuguese sculptor.
- Dorothy Dorow, 86, English soprano.
- Amílcar Henríquez, 33, Panamanian footballer (Árabe Unido, national team), shot.
- Allan Holdsworth, 70, British guitarist and composer (Bruford, U.K., Soft Machine), heart attack.
- Matt Holt, 39, American singer and musician (Nothingface).
- Clifton James, 96, American actor (Live and Let Die, Cool Hand Luke, Eight Men Out), complications from diabetes.
- Aref Lorestani, 45, Iranian actor, heart attack.
- John Maggio, 64, American pharmacologist, cancer.
- Brigid Makowski, 80, Irish politician and activist.
- Emma Morano, 117, Italian supercentenarian, verified world's oldest living person, last-known surviving person born in the 1800s.
- Sylvia Moy, 78, American songwriter ("Uptight (Everything's Alright)", "I Was Made to Love Her", "My Cherie Amour") and record producer.
- Leonard Reiffel, 89, American physicist, inventor of telestrator.
- Matt Stephens, 91, Australian politician, member of the Western Australian Legislative Assembly (1971–1989).
- Alfonso Yuchengco, 94, Filipino industrialist and diplomat.

=== 16 ===
- George Bălăiță, 81, Romanian author.
- Michael Bogdanov, 78, British theatre director, heart attack.
- Gianni Boncompagni, 84, Italian television and radio presenter (Discoring).
- Rosemary Frankau, 84, British actress (Terry and June).
- Robert Godwin, 74, American retiree, victim of random killing, shot.
- Colin Harrison, 88, Australian cricketer.
- Ed Havrot, 89, Canadian politician.
- Satrio Budihardjo Joedono, 84, Indonesian economist, Chairman of the Audit Board (1998–2004).
- Brian King, 74, Irish sculptor.
- Spartaco Landini, 73, Italian footballer (Inter Milan, Napoli).
- Moses Paukan, 83, American Yup'ik politician, member of the Alaska House of Representatives (1968–1971).
- Jim Reynolds, 79, Canadian football player (Ottawa Rough Riders, Montreal Alouettes, Hamilton Tiger-Cats).
- Bud Wiser, 87, American television writer and producer (One Day at a Time, Who's the Boss?, The New Lassie).

=== 17 ===
- Guy Ébrard, 90, French politician.
- Vimala Gowda, 63, Indian politician, member of Karnataka Legislative Council (2011–2014).
- Claude Frioux, 85, French academic.
- Lee Hall, 82, American artist and writer, stomach cancer.
- Julia E. Hamblet, 100, American colonel.
- Robert B. Hibbs, 84, American Episcopal prelate, Bishop of West Texas.
- Marta Kroutilová, 91, Czech Olympic sprint canoeist.
- Dawson Mathis, 76, American politician, member of the U.S. House of Representatives from Georgia's 2nd district (1971–1981).
- Joe McCorquodale, 96, American politician, member (1959–1983) and speaker (1971–1983) of the Alabama House of Representatives.
- Devineni Nehru, 62, Indian politician, member of Andhra Pradesh Legislative Assembly (1983–1999, 2004–2009), heart attack.
- John T. Noonan Jr., 90, American jurist, member of the Court of Appeals for the Ninth Circuit (since 1985).
- Theresa Offredy, 86, British Olympic fencer.
- Michael Perham, 69, British Anglican prelate, Bishop of Gloucester (2004–2014).
- Rosey, 47, Samoan-American professional wrestler (WWE, AJPW, FMW), heart failure.
- Sean Scanlan, 68, Scottish actor.
- Nicolle Van Den Broeck, 70, Belgian racing cyclist, Road Race World Champion (1973).
- Trish Vradenburg, 70, American television writer (Designing Women, Kate & Allie, Family Ties), heart attack.
- Shōichi Watanabe, 86, Japanese scholar and historical revisionist, heart failure.
- Othman Wok, 92, Singaporean politician, Minister for Social Affairs (1963–1977).

=== 18 ===
- Vic Albury, 69, American baseball player (Minnesota Twins).
- Bill Anderson, 80, American football player (Washington Redskins, Green Bay Packers) and broadcaster (Vol Network).
- Benedykt Augustyniak, 85, Polish Olympic rower.
- David Ball, 90, American Episcopal prelate, Bishop of Albany (1984–1998).
- Amedeo Benedetti, 62, Italian author.
- Augustin Bubník, 88, Czech Olympic ice hockey player, silver medallist (1948), coach and politician, MP (1998–2002).
- David Chandler, 72, American physical chemist.
- Frank Dostal, 71, German music producer and songwriter (Yes Sir, I Can Boogie).
- Raymond Han, 85, American painter.
- Barkley L. Hendricks, 72, American painter.
- Dorrance Hill Hamilton, 88, American philanthropist, heiress of Campbell's.
- Gordon Langford, 86, English composer.
- Li Yih-yuan, 85, Taiwanese anthropologist, complications of pneumonia.
- Mihalj Mesaroš, 81, Serbian footballer (Partizan, San Diego Toros).
- Jean Miot, 77, French journalist.
- Ron Moeser, 74, Canadian politician, lymphoma.
- Yvonne Monlaur, 77, French actress (Three Strangers in Rome, Circus of Horrors, The Brides of Dracula).
- Jaak Panksepp, 73, Estonian-born American neuroscientist, cancer.
- Diego Rafecas, 46, Argentine actor and film director.
- David H. Rodgers, 93, American politician, Mayor of Spokane, Washington (1967–1978).
- J. C. Spink, 45, American producer (A History of Violence, The Hangover, The Butterfly Effect), accidental drug overdose.
- Rebecca Swift, 53, British poet, cancer.
- Digby Taylor, 75, New Zealand sailor.
- Cornel Vena, 84, Romanian Olympic modern pentathlete.

=== 19 ===
- Jill Amos, 89, New Zealand politician and community leader.
- Nikolay Andrushchenko, 73, Russian journalist, injuries sustained in a beating.
- Bernard Bocquet, 68, French Olympic cyclist.
- Antun Bogetić, 94, Croatian Roman Catholic prelate, Bishop of Poreč-Pula (1984–1997).
- Dick Contino, 87, American accordionist.
- Delbert Daisey, 89, American waterfowl decoy maker.
- Tom Fleming, 65, American long-distance runner, heart attack.
- Phil Gray, 69, Australian politician.
- Aaron Hernandez, 27, American football player (New England Patriots) and convicted murderer, suicide by hanging.
- Farouk Janjoun, 61, Iraqi Olympic boxer.
- Eddie Macon, 90, American football player (Chicago Bears, Oakland Raiders).
- Carl Manner, 87, Austrian businessman (Manner confectionery).
- Sven Pettersson, 89, Swedish Olympic ski jumper (1956).
- Lyda Ann Thomas, 80, American politician, Mayor of Galveston, Texas (2004–2010).
- Yip Kai Foon, 55, Hong Kong gangster, cancer.
- Bohdan Zip, 88, Canadian politician, member of the Legislative Assembly of Alberta (1982–1986).

=== 20 ===
- Magdalena Abakanowicz, 86, Polish sculptor.
- Alexander Bílek, 76, Czech Olympic racewalker.
- William F. Clayton, 93, American politician and attorney.
- Jay Dickey, 77, American politician, member of the U.S. House of Representatives from Arkansas's 4th congressional district (1993–2001).
- David Dougherty, 50, New Zealand man wrongfully convicted of rape and abduction.
- Vic Elmes, 69, British musician (Christie).
- Sir Ewen Fergusson, 84, British diplomat, Ambassador to South Africa (1982–1984) and France (1987–1992).
- Roberto Ferreiro, 81, Argentine footballer (Independiente, River Plate, national team) and manager.
- John Freely, 90, American author and physics professor.
- Cuba Gooding Sr., 72, American soul singer (The Main Ingredient).
- Craufurd Goodwin, 82, Canadian-born American economist and historian.
- Paul Hébert, 92, Canadian actor and theatre director.
- Jari Helle, 54, Finnish ice hockey player and coach (HC Bolzano).
- Lawrence Hogan, 88, American politician, member of the U.S. House of Representatives from Maryland's 5th congressional district (1969–1975).
- Sir Geoffrey Holland, 78, British civil servant.
- Trustin Howard, 93, American singer, actor and writer (The Joey Bishop Show, This Is Your Life), complications from a fall.
- Eric Ingham, 72, British rugby league player.
- Jang Deok-jin, 82, South Korean politician, Minister of Agriculture.
- Philip Kgosana, 80, South African anti-apartheid activist.
- Kojo Laing, 70, Ghanaian novelist.
- Ledell Lee, 51, American convicted murderer, execution by lethal injection.
- Fernand Leischen, 97, Luxembourgish Olympic fencer (1948, 1952, 1956).
- Germaine Mason, 34, Jamaican-born British high jumper, Olympic silver medalist (2008), traffic collision.
- John McMillan, 78, Australian footballer (St Kilda).
- Sandy McNicol, 72, New Zealand rugby union player (Wanganui, national team).
- Marlys Millhiser, 78, American writer.
- Skeeter Swift, 70, American basketball player (New Orleans Buccaneers, Pittsburgh Condors, San Antonio Spurs) and coach (Liberty Flames).
- Robin Thorne, 87, S. African cricketer.
- Katsuji Ueda, 71, Japanese kickboxer, martial artist and professional wrestler (FMW), heart attack.
- Anicetus Andrew Wang Chong-yi, 97, Chinese Patriotic Catholic prelate, Archbishop of Guiyang (1988–2014).

=== 21 ===
- Lucky Akhand, 60, Bangladeshi singer-composer, lung cancer.
- Cecilia Alvear, 77, Ecuadorian-born American journalist (NBC News), breast cancer.
- Phillip Ayeni, 68, Nigerian military officer, administrator of Bayelsa State (1996–1997).
- Eric Barnard, 92, Australian politician.
- Alexei Bolshakov, 77, Russian politician.
- Danzel Becker, 69, South African cricketer and umpire.
- Carl Christ, 93, American economist.
- Cape Cross, 23, Irish-bred racehorse and sire, euthanized.
- Ugo Ehiogu, 44, English football player (Aston Villa, Middlesbrough, national team) and coach, heart attack.
- Maria Zhorella Fedorova, 101, Austrian-born American opera singer and teacher.
- Wolfgang Fürniß, 72, German politician.
- Sandy Gallin, 76, American talent agent (Michael Jackson) and producer (Buffy the Vampire Slayer, Father of the Bride), multiple myeloma.
- John Grinold, 81, American college athletic director (Northeastern University).
- Kristine Jepson, 54, American mezzo-soprano, cancer.
- Gerry Jones, 84, Australian politician.
- Rex Loring, 91, British-born Canadian radio announcer.
- Sean McEniff, 81, Irish politician and businessman.
- Enrico Medioli, 92, Italian screenwriter (Once Upon a Time in America, The Damned, The Leopard).
- Onuora Nzekwu, 89, Nigerian writer.
- Stathis Psaltis, 66, Greek comedian, lung cancer.
- Robert H. Shaffer, 101, American academic.
- Jetsun Lobsang Tenzin, 80, Tibetan Lama, 103rd Ganden Tripa.
- Bijan Zarnegar, 77, Iranian Olympic fencer (1964).

=== 22 ===
- Miguel Abensour, 78, French philosopher.
- Hector Acebes, 96, American photographer.
- Jeff Butler, 83, English football manager (Kaizer Chiefs, South Africa national team).
- Hubert Dreyfus, 87, American philosopher, cancer.
- Henning Eichberg, 74, German sociologist.
- Bjarte Eikeset, 80, Norwegian lawyer, judge and politician, traffic collision.
- Norman Hatch, 96, American soldier and filmmaker (With the Marines at Tarawa).
- Olga Hegedus, 96, British cellist.
- Götz Heidelberg, 94, German engineer.
- William Hjortsberg, 76, American novelist and screenwriter (Legend, Falling Angel), pancreatic cancer.
- Kay Hubbell, 95, American tennis player.
- Vladimir Kamirski, 74, Polish-Australian conductor.
- Jess Kersey, 76, American basketball official (ABA, NBA), cancer.
- Ian Kirkwood, Lord Kirkwood, 84, Scottish jurist, Senator of the College of Justice.
- Alvin H. Kukuk, 79, American politician.
- Lee Chi-chun, 74, Taiwanese radio presenter.
- Sophie Lefranc-Duvillard, 46, French Olympic alpine skier (1992, 1994, 1998).
- Cleber Leite, 47, Brazilian Olympic rower.
- Erin Moran, 56, American actress (Happy Days, Joanie Loves Chachi, Galaxy of Terror), tonsil cancer.
- Peter Moss, 78, British colonial administrator, park ranger, and pioneer of eco-tourism.
- Hiroshi Nakai, 74, Japanese politician, stomach cancer.
- Attilio Nicora, 80, Italian Roman Catholic cardinal, Bishop of Verona (1992–1997), President of Patrimony of the Apostolic See (2002–2011).
- Bill Peck, 90, American football coach.
- Sir Julian Priestley, 66, British civil servant, Secretary General of the European Parliament (1997–2007), cancer.
- Witold Pyrkosz, 90, Polish actor (M jak miłość, Janosik, Czterej pancerni i pies).
- Gustavo Rojo, 93, Uruguayan actor (Tarzan and the Mermaids, The Evil Forest, The Valley of Gwangi).
- Hans-Heinrich Sander, 72, German politician.
- Michele Scarponi, 37, Italian racing cyclist, 2011 Giro d'Italia winner, traffic collision.
- Pere Tàpias, 70, Spanish food writer and radio presenter.
- Peter Wells, 80, British medical physicist.

=== 23 ===
- Isiaka Adeleke, 62, Nigerian politician, Governor of Osun State (1992–1993), heart attack.
- Jerry Adriani, 70, Brazilian singer and actor, cancer.
- Inga Ålenius, 78, Swedish actress (Hem till byn, Fanny and Alexander, In Bed with Santa).
- Leo Baxendale, 86, British comics artist (The Bash Street Kids, Minnie the Minx, Little Plum).
- Chris Bearde, 80, Australian comedy writer and producer (Rowan & Martin's Laugh-In, The Sonny & Cher Comedy Hour, The Gong Show), heart attack.
- Jaynne Bittner, 91, American baseball player (Grand Rapids Chicks, Fort Wayne Daisies).
- Anne Pippin Burnett, 91, American classics scholar.
- Henry Chung, 98, Chinese-American diplomat.
- Kathleen Crowley, 87, American actress (Robert Montgomery Presents, Maverick, Downhill Racer).
- Ana Delfosse, 85, Chilean-born American race-car driver and mechanic.
- Mickey Dewar, 61, Australian historian, motor neuron disease.
- George Eisman, 66, American dietitian and veganism activist, cancer.
- Imre Földi, 78, Hungarian weightlifter, Olympic champion (1972).
- Charles Foster, 94, English-born Canadian writer and publicist.
- Noritoshi Kanai, 94, Japanese-born American executive.
- Adalbert Korponai, 51, Ukrainian footballer (Kremin Kremenchuk, Metalist Kharkiv), colon cancer.
- Kate O'Beirne, 67, American political columnist, editor (National Review), and commentator (Capital Gang), lung cancer.
- Eva Picardi, 69, Italian philosopher.
- František Rajtoral, 31, Czech footballer (Baník Ostrava, Viktoria Plzeň, national team), suicide by hanging.
- Luis Pércovich Roca, 85, Peruvian politician, Prime Minister (1984–1985).
- Johnny Roe, 79, Irish jockey.
- Ken Sears, 83, American basketball player (New York Knicks, San Francisco Warriors).
- Armond Seidler, 97, American educator and inventor.
- Erdoğan Teziç, 81, Turkish academic.
- Chriet Titulaer, 73, Dutch astronomer, television presenter, and science and technology writer.
- Michael Williams, Baron Williams of Baglan, 67, British peer and diplomat, pancreatic cancer.

=== 24 ===
- Glory Annen, 64, Canadian actress (Felicity).
- Benjamin Barber, 77, American political theorist and author (Jihad vs. McWorld), pancreatic cancer.
- František Brůna, 72, Czech handball player (national team), Olympic silver medalist (1972).
- Benjamin O. Burnett, 79, American politician.
- Xavier Corberó, 81, Spanish sculptor.
- Agustín Edwards Eastman, 89, French-born Chilean newspaper publisher, owner of El Mercurio.
- Phil Edwards, 67, British Olympic racing cyclist (1972).
- Agnes Giebel, 95, German soprano.
- Don Gordon, 90, American actor (Bullitt, Papillon, The Towering Inferno).
- Jack Harold Jones, 52, American serial killer, execution by lethal injection.
- Dagmar Lerchová, 86, Czech Olympic figure skater (1948).
- Michael Mantenuto, 35, American actor (Miracle) and military officer, suicide by gunshot.
- Robert M. Pirsig, 88, American writer and philosopher (Zen and the Art of Motorcycle Maintenance).
- Osmund Reynolds, 84, British paediatrician.
- Bradley Sack, 81, American researcher, aneurysm.
- Nicholas Sand, 75, American chemist, heart attack.
- Evangelina Villegas, 92, Mexican biochemist.

=== 25 ===
- Adolf Bachura, 84, Austrian Olympic ice hockey player (1964).
- Calep Emphrey Jr., 67, American drummer (B.B. King).
- Rolf Fjeldvær, 91, Norwegian politician, MP (1965–1981).
- Cobie Floor, 86, Dutch Olympic diver.
- Hsieh Chin-ting, 81, Taiwanese politician, Miaoli County Magistrate (1981–1989).
- Chris Gollon, 64, British painter.
- Richard O. Gregerson, 84, American politician.
- Gert Grigoleit, 89, American Olympic sprint canoer.
- Mikel Harry, 65, American author, co-developer of Six Sigma.
- Red Hoggatt, 86, American college football player and coach.
- Amol Jichkar, 38, Indian cricketer.
- Sasha Lakovic, 45, Canadian ice hockey player (New Jersey Devils), brain cancer.
- Erik Martin, 81, German songwriter and editor (Muschelhaufen).
- Philippe Mestre, 89, French media executive and politician, member of the National Assembly (1981–1993), Minister of Veteran Affairs and War Victims (1993–1995).
- Alec Olney, 95, British Olympic long-distance runner.
- Aina Rado, 70, Spanish teacher and politician, president of the Parliament of the Balearic Islands (2010–2011).
- Elena Rzhevskaya, 97, Belarusian-born Russian writer.
- Issa Samb, 71, Senegalese artist.
- Munyua Waiyaki, 90, Kenyan politician, Minister for Foreign Affairs (1974–1979).

=== 26 ===
- Moïse Brou Apanga, 35, Ivorian-born Gabonese footballer, heart attack.
- Raj Bagri, Baron Bagri, 86, Indian-born British businessman (London Metal Exchange).
- Prince Bartholomew, 77, Trinidadian cricketer (national team).
- Wendy Bergen, 61, American journalist, brain aneurysm.
- Babalola Borishade, 71, Nigerian politician, lung and heart disease.
- Jonathan Demme, 73, American film director (The Silence of the Lambs, Philadelphia, Rachel Getting Married), Oscar winner (1992), complications from esophageal cancer and heart disease.
- Charles Eugster, 97, British Masters athlete.
- Tom Forkner, 98, American businessman and lawyer, co-founder of Waffle House.
- Andrew G. Frommelt, 95, American politician.
- James Knoll Gardner, 76, American jurist, U.S. District Court for the Eastern District of Pennsylvania (since 2002).
- Robert Hilder, 67, American jurist, esophageal cancer.
- Chet Kalm, 91, American artist, pneumonia.
- Dennis Karjala, 77, American law professor.
- William L. Kirk, 84, American air force general.
- Daniel Francis Merriam, 90, American geologist.
- Bill Page, 91, American reed player and band leader.
- Margit Pörtner, 45, Danish curler, European champion (1994), Olympic silver medalist (1998).
- Harold Van Heuvelen, 98, American composer and teacher.
- Andreas von der Meden, 74, German actor, voice actor and musician.
- Peter Venables, 94, British psychologist.
- Ronald Karslake Starr Wood, 98, British plant pathologist.

=== 27 ===
- Vito Acconci, 77, American artist and architectural designer, stroke.
- Amberleigh House, 25, Irish racehorse, winner of 2004 Grand National, complications from colic.
- Nikolai Arefyev, 37, Russian footballer.
- Eduard Brunner, 77, Swiss clarinetist.
- Vinu Chakravarthy, 71, Indian actor.
- Chen Tingru, 103, Chinese WWII army officer.
- Luis Dogliotti, 79, Uruguayan footballer.
- Jan Flinik, 84, Polish Olympic field hockey player (1952, 1960).
- Peter George, 75, Canadian economist, President of McMaster University (1995–2010).
- Vitaliy Kalynychenko, 79, Soviet-born American human rights activist (Ukrainian Helsinki Group).
- Vinod Khanna, 70, Indian actor (Mere Apne, Amar Akbar Anthony, Suryaa: An Awakening) and politician, member of the Lok Sabha for Gurdaspur (1997–2009; since 2014), bladder cancer.
- Joe Leonard, 84, American motorcycle racer and racecar driver.
- Lin Yi-han, 26, Taiwanese novelist, suicide by hanging.
- Robin Millhouse, 87, Australian judge and politician.
- Alexia Pickering, 86, New Zealand disabilities rights campaigner.
- Yameen Rasheed, 29, Maldivian liberal blogger, stabbed.
- Sadanoyama Shinmatsu, 79, Japanese sumo wrestler, pneumonia.
- Peter Spier, 89, Dutch-born American illustrator and children's writer.
- Richard Tucholka, 63, American author and game designer (Fringeworthy, Bureau 13), cancer.
- Kenneth Williams, 38, American serial killer, execution by lethal injection.
- Julius Youngner, 96, American virologist.

=== 28 ===
- Lothar Beckert, 85, German Olympic long-distance runner (1956, 1960).
- Jeremy Boyd, 55, American football player (Seattle Seahawks) and firefighter.
- Brazo de Oro, 57, Mexican professional wrestler (CMLL, UWA, NWA), heart attack.
- Joanna Brouk, 68, American electronic musician and composer.
- Ken Breitenbach, 62, Canadian ice hockey player (Buffalo Sabres), cancer.
- Grania Davis, 73, American author and editor.
- Ion Degen, 91, Ukrainian-born Israeli writer, doctor and medical scientist.
- Mariano Gagnon, 87, American missionary.
- Richard Haynes, 90, American lawyer.
- Danny Killeen, 84, American Olympic sailor.
- Janelle Kirtley, 73, American water skier, world champion (1961).
- Maurice Lauze, 94, French racing cyclist (1948 Tour de France).
- Edouard Mathos, 68, Central African Roman Catholic prelate, Bishop of Bambari (since 2004).
- Luis Olmo, 97, Puerto Rican baseball player (Brooklyn Dodgers), double pneumonia and complications from Alzheimer's disease.
- Billy Scott, 68, American race car driver.
- John Shifflett, 64, American jazz musician, pancreatic cancer.
- Donie Shine, 65, Irish football player (Clann na nGael, Roscommon) and manager.
- Patrick Thaddeus, 84, American astronomer.
- Francis Travis, 95, American-born Swiss orchestral conductor.
- Andrew Tyler, 70, British animal rights campaigner and music journalist.
- Sir John Whitmore, 79, British racing driver and executive coach.

=== 29 ===
- Diego Natale Bona, 90, Italian Roman Catholic prelate, Bishop of Porto e Santa Rufina (1985–1994) and Saluzzo (1994–2003).
- Sonika Chauhan, 27, Indian actress and model, car crash.
- Jonathan Dele, 70, Nigerian Olympic boxer (1968).
- Jordan Edwards, 15, American victim of police shooting, shot.
- George Genyk, 78, American college football player (University of Michigan) and coach, cancer.
- Vehid Gunić, 76, Bosnian journalist.
- William M. Hoffman, 78, American playwright (As Is).
- Saeed Karimian, 45, Iranian media activist, director-general of GEM TV, shot.
- Ernie Kell, 88, American politician, Mayor of Long Beach (1984–1994), cancer.
- Herbert Nkabiti, 36, Botswanan welterweight boxer, head injuries sustained in a fight.
- Lidia Pitteri, 83, Italian Olympic gymnast (1952).
- R. Vidyasagar Rao, 77, Indian irrigation engineer, bladder cancer.
- Lola Romanucci-Ross, 93, American culutral anthropologist.
- Mátyás Usztics, 68, Hungarian actor.
- Edward D. White Jr., 92, American architect.

=== 30 ===
- Leone Bagnall, 83, Canadian politician.
- Belchior, 70, Brazilian singer and composer.
- Clifford Brewer, 104, British surgeon.
- Anna Lee Carroll, 86, American actress (Not of This Earth, The Heart Is a Lonely Hunter, Marlowe).
- Lorna Gray, 99, American actress (O, My Darling Clementine, Captain America, Oh! Susanna).
- Howard Hart, 76, American CIA officer.
- Esad Hećimović, 53, Bosnian investigative journalist.
- Preston Henn, 86, American entrepreneur (Fort Lauderdale Swap Shop) and racing driver.
- Jayson Hinder, 51, Australian politician, member of the Australian Capital Territory Legislative Assembly (2016), traffic collision.
- Jack Imel, 84, American entertainer.
- Jidéhem, 81, Belgian comics artist (Sophie).
- Archduke Joseph Árpád of Austria, 84, Austro-Hungarian royal, Captain General of the Order of Vitéz (since 1977).
- Ray Kogovsek, 75, American politician, member of the Colorado Senate (1970–1978) and the U.S. House of Representatives from Colorado's 3rd congressional district (1979–1985).
- Borys Oliynyk, 81, Ukrainian author, poet, translator and politician, member of Verkhovna Rada (1992–2006).
- Anders Omholt, 90, Norwegian physicist.
- Tam Spiva, 84, American television writer (The Brady Bunch).
- Ueli Steck, 40, Swiss rock climber and mountaineer, climbing fall.
- Jean Stein, 83, American author and editor (The Paris Review), suicide by jumping.
