= Fabrizia (given name) =

Fabrizia is an Italian feminine given name. It is the name of:

- Fabrizia Baduel Glorioso (1927–2017), Italian politician
- Fabrizia Mealli (born 1966), Italian statistician
- Fabrizia D'Ottavio (born 1985), Italian gymnast
- Fabrizia Pons (born 1955), Italian rally driver
- Fabrizia Ramondino (1936–2008), Italian writer
- Fabrizia Sacchi (born 1971), Italian actress
