= John Maggio =

John Maggio may refer to:

- John Maggio (pharmacologist), American pharmacologist
- John Maggio (director), American documentary film director, writer and producer
