= Ray Chamberlain =

Ray Chamberlain may refer to:

- Ray Chamberlain (musician) (1930–2017), American jazz guitarist and bassist
- Ray Chamberlain (umpire) (born 1976), Australian rules football field umpire
