= Ebrard =

Ebrard or Ébrard is a surname. Notable people with the surname include:

- Guy Ébrard (1926–2017), French politician
- Johannes Heinrich August Ebrard (1818–1888), German theologian
- Marie Ébrard, author of La bonne cuisine de Madame E. Saint-Ange under the pseudonym E. Saint-Ange
- Marcelo Ebrard (born 1959), Mexican politician
