= Mealli =

Mealli is an Italian surname. Notable people with the surname include:

- Bruno Mealli (born 1937), former Italian cyclist
- Fabrizia Mealli (born 1966), Italian statistician
- Giovanni Antonio Pandolfi Mealli (c. 1630–c. 1669/1670), Italian composer and violinist
