= Don Maddison =

English footballer

Personal information
- Full name: Donald Maddison
- Date of birth: 15 February 1927
- Place of birth: Washington, England
- Date of death: 4 April 2017 (aged 90)
- Place of death: Ho-Ho-Kus, New Jersey, US
- Position: Goalkeeper

Youth career
- Hylton Colliery Welfare
- Sunderland

Senior career*
Years	Team	Apps	(Gls)
1946–1948	Bradford Park Avenue	0	(0)
1948–1949	Blackpool	0	(0)
1949	Blackhall Colliery Welfare		
1949	Brandon Colliery Welfare		
1949–19??	Horden Colliery Welfare		
1950–1951	Darlington	1	(0)
1951–1953	Berwick Rangers	23	(0)
- * Club domestic league appearances and goals

Donald Maddison (15 February 1927 – 4 April 2017) was an English footballer who played as a goalkeeper in the Football League for Darlington and in the Scottish C Division for Berwick Rangers.

== Life and career ==
Maddison was born in Washington, County Durham, and began his football career as a youngster with Hylton Colliery Welfare during the Second World War. In April 1942, he played at Roker Park in a match against Sunderland Air Training Corps (ATC) in aid of the Sunderland Echo's Comfort for the Forces Fund; according to that newspaper, "both these junior teams can put eleven clever footballers into the field". and later that year kept goal in the Hetton Junior League 1941–42 championship decider against Ryhope Juniors. He signed for Sunderland for the 1943–44 season, and by December 1945, he was playing adult football for Horden Colliery Welfare, He signed amateur forms with Football League Second Division club Bradford Park Avenue in June 1946, but never played league football for them.

He joined Blackpool of the First Division in February 1948, and played regularly for the reserve team in the Central League, but again played no part for the first team. A year later he was back in the north-east with Blackhall Colliery Welfare, moving on to Brandon Colliery Welfare before returning to Horden Colliery Welfare for the 1949–50 season. After injury to first-choice goalkeeper Jack Washington, Maddison played in the FA Cup tie against Billingham Synthonia, the winner to visit League club Stockport County in the first round proper. Horden lost.

Maddison returned to the Football League in 1950 with Darlington of the Third Division North. He finally made his league debut on 26 March 1951, deputising for the long-serving Billy Dunn in the local derby at home to Hartlepools United, played in a snowstorm on a quagmire of a Feethams pitch dotted with pools of standing water. Darlington lost 1–0, and it was Maddison's only first-team appearance. At the end of the 1950–51 season, he signed for Berwick Rangers, an English club playing in the Scottish C Division. He made 23 league appearances and another 10 in the various cup competitions in two seasons with the club. While a Berwick player, he was reported to be working "on the administrative staff of a well-known steel manufacturing firm".

Maddison later emigrated to the United States, where he opened a travel agency in Allendale, New Jersey, in 1968. He was married to Suzanne née Mooney, and lived in Ho-Ho-Kus until his death there in 2017 at the age of 90.
