= Richard O. Gregerson =

American politician

Member of the South Dakota Senate
- In office 1979–1982

Personal details
- Born: April 27, 1932
- Died: April 25, 2017 (aged 84)
- Party: Republican
- Education: Augustana College; University of South Dakota

Richard O. Gregerson (April 27, 1932 – April 25, 2017) was an American politician. He served as a Republican member of the South Dakota Senate.

== Life and career ==
Gregerson attended Augustana College and the University of South Dakota.

Gregerson served in the South Dakota Senate from 1979 to 1982.

Gregerson died on April 25, 2017, at the age of 84.
