= Jerrell Shofner =

American historian

Jerrell Harris Shofner (January 30, 1929 – April 11, 2017) was an American historian and professor of history at the University of Central Florida (UCF). He wrote 16 books, many about Florida's history. He chaired UCF's history department and became a professor emeritus at the school.

Shofner served in the United States Air Force between 1946 and 1960, earned a master's degree and a Ph.D. from Florida State University, and joined the University of Central Florida in 1972. He served as president of the Florida Historical Society. He married and had four children. He retired in 1990.

Shofner wrote about Florida's Black codes. He also wrote about "Militant Negro Laborers" during the Reconstruction era He also wrote about the drafting of the 1868 Florida Constitution. and forced labor.

Shofner's History of Jefferson County chronicles the area's development as a cotton producing region. George W. Reid described his book Nor Is it Over Yet on Florida during the Reconstruction Era as an "excellent example of high quality scholarship."

== Selected works ==
- History of Apopka and Northwest Orange County
- Jackson County, Florida: A History
- Nor is it Over Yet: Florida in the Era of Reconstruction 1863 - 1877, University of Florida Press (1974)
- Daniel Ladd: Merchant Prince of Frontier Florida University of Florida Press (1978)
- Orlando: The City Beautiful Continental Heritage Press (1984)
