= Jang Deok-jin =

South Korean lawyer and politician

Jang Deok-jin (Korean: 장덕진; 27 June 1934 – 20 April 2017) was a South Korean lawyer and politician.

A native of Chuncheon, Jang attended Korea University, where he earned a law degree in 1960. Jang began his political career in 1968 at what became the Ministry of Strategy and Finance. He led the Korea Football Association from 1970 to 1973. Elected to the National Assembly in 1971, Jang served one term and in 1973 was named vice minister of agriculture. Four years later, in 1977, he was nominated to head the agriculture ministry.

After retiring from politics, Jang became an economic adviser for the provinces of Heilongjiang and Jilin in China and also taught at Harbin Institute of Technology. He died, aged 82, on 20 April 2017.
