= Jennette Williams =

American photographer

- Born: December 17, 1952; New York City, U.S.
- Died: April 9, 2017 (aged 64)
- Known for: Photographer, educator

Jennette Williams (December 17, 1952 – April 9, 2017) was an American photographer known for her photographs of women.

Williams was born on December 17, 1952, in Forest Hills, Queens. She attended the Yale University School of Art. In 2000 she was the recipient of a Guggenheim Fellowship. In 2009 Duke University Press and the Center for Documentary Studies published a portfolio of Williams' platinum prints of women bathers entitled The Bathers. The book was awarded the Honickman First Book Prize in Photography.

Williams taught at the School of Visual Arts.

She died on April 9, 2017, at the age of 64. Her work is held in the collection of the Philadelphia Museum of Art and is archived at the David M. Rubenstein Rare Book & Manuscript Library at Duke University.

== Publications ==
- The Bathers. Durham, NC: Duke University Press; Center for Documentary Studies, 2009. ISBN 978-0-8223-4623-4. With a foreword by Mary Ellen Mark.
