= Robert Marta =

American camera operator (1943–2017)

- Born: Robert Daniel Marta; October 5, 1943; Pasadena, California
- Died: April 13, 2017 (aged 73); Bozeman, Montana, U.S.
- Other name: Bob Marta
- Education: Montana State University
- Occupation: Camera Operator
- Years active: 1971-1986
- Spouse: Mary Marta
- Children: 2

Robert Daniel Marta (October 5, 1943 – April 13, 2017) was founding member and the first president of the Society of Operating Cameramen — now Society of Camera Operators.

== Biography ==
Robert "Bob" Marta was born on October 5, 1943, in Pasadena, California. He was the son of Grace (née Marsh) and Jack Marta. He graduated from Montana State University, where he was a member of the Beta Rho chapter of Sigma Chi fraternity, in 1966.

Marta worked in the Motion Picture industry as a Camera Operator, beginning as an uncredited assistant cameraman on the 1971 movie, Diamonds Are Forever. His last work was on The Golden Child in 1986.

In 1979, he and twelve other camera operators began working to professionalize the working camera operators' role in the motion picture and television industry, forming the Society of Operating Cameramen (SOC). They incorporated in 1981 in California as a nonprofit organization and he was elected as the Founding President of the Society. The SOC has since changed its name to The Society of Camera Operators to better identify its diverse membership of both men and women. He served as the SOC president until 1985 and was one of the early champions of the industry–wide labor-management safety committee.

After 1986, he retired to Bozeman, Montana, and was active in supporting the Shriner's Children’s Hospital in Spokane, Washington.

Marta died on April 13, 2017, at his home after years of health issues.

== Selected filmography ==
Marta was a camera operator on the following films and shows:

- The Golden Child (1986)
- Poltergeist II: The Other Side (1986)
- Maxie (1985)
- Thief of Hearts (1984)
- Streets of Fire (1984)
- Hart to Hart (1982-1983) (TV series) (14 episodes)
- Deadly Encounter (1982) (TV film)
- Fantasy Island (1982) (TV series) (2 episodes)
- Personal Best (1982)
- Joe Dancer (1981-1983) (TV film series) (3 episodes)
- To Find My Son (1981) (TV film)
- The Final Countdown (1981)
- The Jerk (1979)
- ...And Justice for All (1979)
- Joni (1979)
- Magic (1978)
- The One and Only (1978)
- Oh, God! (1978)
- Billy Jack Goes to Washington (1977)
- The Trial of Billy Jack (1974)
- Ginger in the Morning (1974)
- Rhinoceros (1974)
- Diamonds Are Forever (1971)

== Honors ==
He received the Society of Operating Cameramen’s Presidents Award for Lifetime Achievement in 1996.
