= Dennis Shaw (cricketer) =

English cricketer

Personal information
- Full name: Dennis George Shaw
- Born: 16 February 1931; Salford, Lancashire, England
- Died: 5 April 2017 (aged 86)
- Batting: Right-handed
- Bowling: Leg break googly

Domestic team information
- Years: Team
- 1949: Warwickshire

Career statistics
Competition	First-class
Matches	1
Runs scored	17
Batting average	17.00
100s/50s	–/–
Top score	17
Balls bowled	204
Wickets	2
Bowling average	53.00
5 wickets in innings	–
10 wickets in match	–
Best bowling	2/60
Catches/stumpings	–/–
- Source: Cricinfo, 9 May 2012

Dennis George Shaw (16 February 1931 – 5 April 2017) was an English cricketer. Shaw was a right-handed batsman who bowled leg break googly. He was born at Salford, Lancashire.

Shaw made a single first-class appearance for Warwickshire against the Combined Services in 1949 at Edgbaston. Warwickshire won the toss and elected to bat, making 368/9 declared in their first-innings, with Shaw making 17 runs before he was dismissed by Robert Wilson. The Combined Services responded in their first-innings with 284 all out, with Shaw taking the wickets of Bill Greensmith and John Deighton to finish the innings with figures of 2/60 from 20 overs. In their second-innings, Shaw wasn't required to bat, with Warwickshire declaring their innings on 216/5. The Combined Services narrowly avoided defeat, reaching 192/9 in their second-innings, before the match was declared a draw. Shaw bowled 14 wicketless overs for the cost of 46 runs in the innings. This was his only major appearance for Warwickshire.

He died on 5 April 2017, aged 86.
