= Ameer Bux Shar =

Sindhi-language poet and writer of Pakistan

Amir Bux Shar
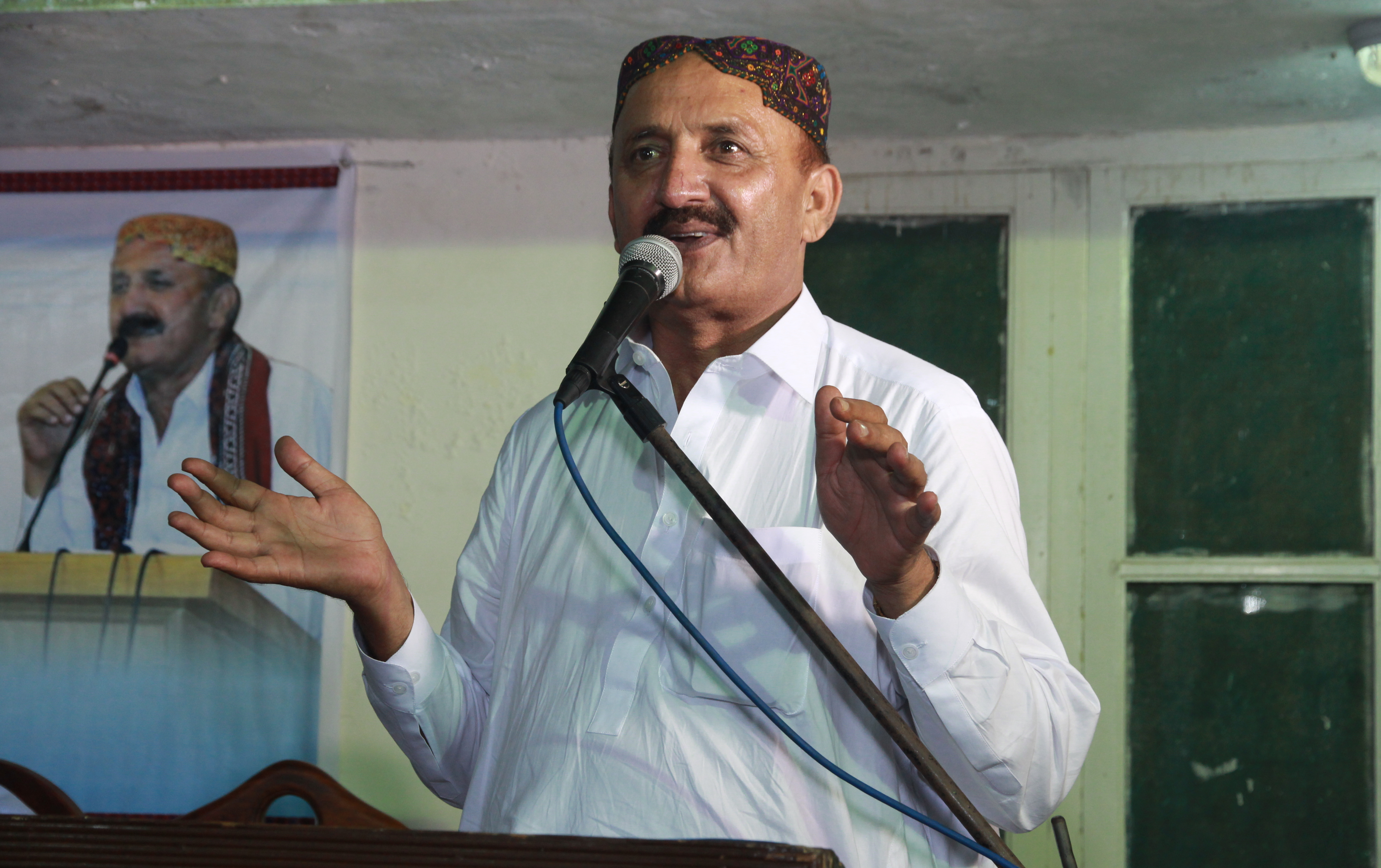
- Born: Aarab (عارب); 1 May 1960; Sindhri
- Died: 5 April 2017; Karachi, Pakistan
- Occupations: Writer and poet
- Spouse: 2

Amir Bux Shar was a notable Sindhi-language poet and writer of Pakistan. In addition to his writing, he was also a social worker. He was a dedicated leftist throughout his entire life. Born into a family living under a wrenched hut, he proved himself as one of the most educated man in that society and later on, throughout Sindh. Amir used to write in various newspapers in his adulthood and continued this practice till his last breath. His autobiographies Rae Per Rat Kaya (Sindhi: رائي پيرَ رت ڪيا; English: The mustard seeds made the feet bleed) and Chipon Per Chinan (Sindhi: ڇپون پيرَ ڇنن; English: Let the heavy mountain rocks tear my feet apart) are notable works in Sindhi literature. Along with these two his work on Kahlora Rule in Sindh was a masterpiece in their history. Shar translated Documents which he got from Mian Gul Muhammad Kalhore, the successor of Kalhora Hukumrans, living in Mirpurkhas.
