= Jari Helle =

Finnish ice hockey player and coach

Jari Juhani Helle (August 10, 1962 in Tampere – April 20, 2017) was a Finnish ice hockey player and coach. He had a brief career in the SM-liiga, playing 18 games for Ilves Tampere in 1979-80 and 9 with Lukko Rauma in 1981-82.

He started his coaching career in 1998 as coach of the U-20 team of KooKoo.

He won twice the Italian title, both as coach of HC Bolzano: 2007-2008 (as assistant coach) and 2008-2009 (as head coach).
