= Eric Ingham =

English rugby league footballer

Personal information
- Full name: Eric J. Ingham
- Born: third ¼ 1944 Leeds district, England
- Died: 20 April 2017 (aged 72) Tingley, Leeds, England

Playing information
- Position: Hooker
Club
Years	Team	Pld	T	G	FG	P
1972–77	Wakefield Trinity	55	3	0	0	9

Eric J. Ingham (third ¼ 1944 – 20 April 2017) was an English professional rugby league footballer who played in the 1970s. He played at club level for Oulton ARLFC (in Oulton, Leeds) and Wakefield Trinity, as a hooker, he became a committee member at Wakefield Trinity in 1981, during this period he was involved in the signing of numerous players, including "The Emperor of Lang Park" Wally Lewis, he was the chairman of Wakefield Trinity for a few months during the 1984–85 season, before retiring from rugby league for good.

== Background ==
Eric Ingham's birth was registered in Leeds district, West Riding of Yorkshire, England, he worked as a plumber, he retired from playing in 1977 to concentrate on his plumbing business, he died aged 72 in Tingley, Leeds, West Yorkshire, England, his funeral service took place at Cottingley Crematorium, Cottingley, Leeds at 11:00am on Thursday 4 May 2017, followed by a reception at The Hare & Hounds, 7 Batley Road, West Ardsley.

== Playing career ==
=== Club career ===
Eric Ingham made his début for Wakefield Trinity playing as an interchange/substitute in the 18-6 victory over Swinton in the 1972 BBC2 Floodlit Trophy during the 1972–73 season at Station Road, Swinton on Wednesday 25 October 1972, he made his starting début (with Tony Handforth injured, regular Hooker Mick Morgan was moved to loose forward) in the 48-10 victory over Hunslet at Parkside, Hunslet on Sunday 14 January 1973, he scored his first try for Wakefield Trinity in the 33-6 victory over Widnes in the first-round of the Play-offs during the 1972–73 season, he scored his last try for Wakefield Trinity in the 16-6 victory over Wigan at Belle Vue, Wakefield on Sunday 21 November 1976, and he played his last match for Wakefield Trinity in the 0-52 defeat by Featherstone Rovers on Sunday 2 January 1977.
