= Clifford Brewer =

English surgeon

Clifford Brewer TD, FRCS, PR, FICS
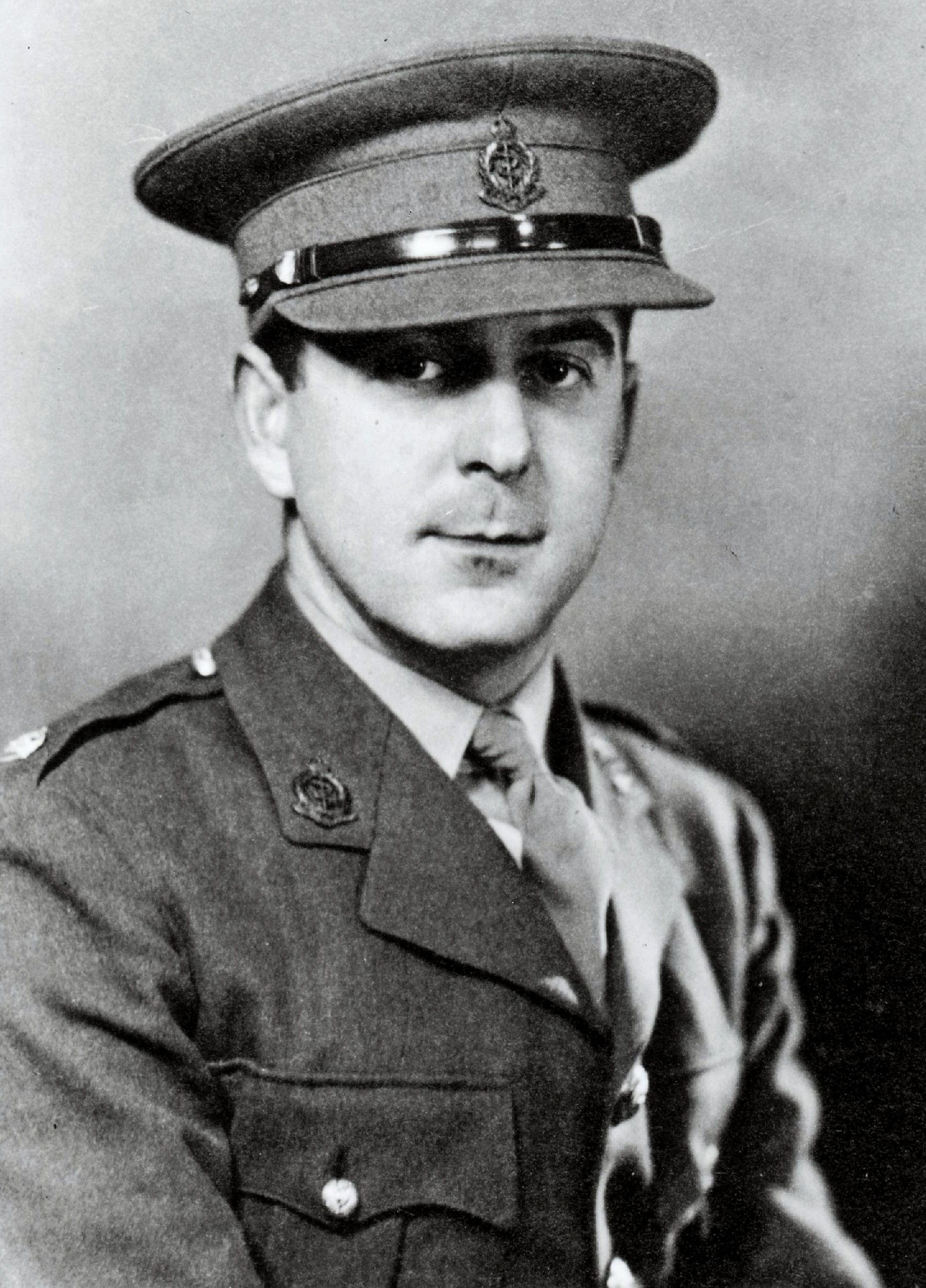
- Brewer during the Second World War
- Born: 29 April 1913
- Died: 30 April 2017 (aged 104)
- Education: Liverpool Royal Infirmary
- Occupation: Surgeon
- Known for: Surgical work during WWII
- Spouse: Marjorie
- Children: 5

Clifford Brewer (29 April 1913 – 30 April 2017) was an English surgeon who operated on more than 1,000 casualties after the D-Day landings in 1944. He was the last surviving surgeon to have worked during the landings.

== Early life ==
Brewer was born on 29 April 1913 to Oscar John Brewer, inspector of education in the city of Liverpool and Marian Brewer née Almond.

His early education was at Quarry Bank School.

== Medical career ==
Brewer attended the University of Liverpool School of Medicine when only 15 years old. As a medical student, he won numerous prizes and medals in physiology, anatomy, medicine, pharmacology, obstetrics and gynaecology. In addition, he happened to be a skilled after-dinner speaker and represented his university in other cities. He graduated in 1935 with honours and subsequently did his first house jobs at Liverpool Royal Infirmary. His achievements in anatomy led him to do research in anatomy and to become an anatomy demonstrator. As well as being surgical tutor, he was appointed Robert Kelly's surgical registrar.

Brewer was awarded his fellowship in surgery, FRCS, in 1938 at the age of 25 years and completed his training as a resident surgical officer at the Radcliffe Infirmary in Oxford.

Being a Territorial Army officer with the 6th (1st Southern) Oxford Territorial Hospital at the onset of World War II, Brewer was mobilised with his unit and was unable to take up the Leverhulme fellowship which he had won. He witnessed action in Egypt, Palestine, Syria and France. He performed surgery on General Władysław Sikorski, whilst posted in Palestine, earning him the Order of Polonia Restituta. Following the D-Day landings, he performed twenty operations a day for nine months, carrying out more than 1,000 surgical procedures in total. On arrival in Normandy, he was allocated number 12 out of the 12 Field Surgical Units (FSU) on the front line. Accompanied by an anaesthetist, his team were self-contained with two lorries and an operating theatre.

After the war, Brewer returned to Liverpool Royal Infirmary and became an examiner in surgery. Elected president of the university club, he was also member of the Medical Institution and Antiquarian Horological Society.

Brewer was a leading consultant surgeon at the Liverpool Royal Infirmary, having been appointed a consultant in 1946. In addition, Brewer held senior positions at the Liverpool Homeopathic Hospital, St Helens Hospital, University of Liverpool and Liverpool Dental School. He enjoyed lecturing to dental students until 1978 when he retired.

Whilst at Liverpool, Brewer made significant contributions to breast and colorectal surgery. His interest in 'bust and bottoms' led him to establish a breast clinic at Liverpool Royal Infirmary resulting in also being awarded a fellow of the International College of Surgeons. He was the first surgeon to perform an adrenalectomy to treat advanced malignancy.

== Personal ==
Brewer married Marjorie Hirst, who he met during a Compound Fracture reduction in Normandy. They had five children, John, Christine, Jane, Peter and Bill. He was a keen angler, starting the hobby at the age of 10 and continuing until near the end of life. He estimated that he had caught more than 25,000 fish during his lifetime. In 1966, he caught five salmon in 45 minutes on the River Eden, Cumbria. At one time, he caught a rainbow trout weighing 13lb, a record for the time.

As a member of the Athenaeum Club, London, Brewer made contributions to their committees, particularly in the library committee and its financial stability. He was a collector of antique clocks and old Liverpool pottery, and an active member of the Antiquarian Horological Society. He authored 'The death of kings: a medical history of the kings and queens of England' which considers the likely cause of deaths of past kings and queens of England.

== Selected publications ==
- The Country Life collector's pocket book of clocks. Feltham, Country Life, 1983. ISBN 0600321940
- A brief history of the Liverpool Hahnemann (Homoeopathic) Hospital, 1887–1972
- A brief history of the Liverpool Royal Infirmary, 1887–1978. Liverpool Area Health Authority, Liverpool, 1980.
- The death of kings: A medical history of the kings and queens of England. Abson Books, London. (originally privately published) ISBN 0902920995
