= Vuk Kulenović =

Bosnian composer and teacher (1946-2017)

- Born: July 21, 1946; Sarajevo, Yugoslavia
- Died: April 10, 2017 (aged 70) Boston, Massachusetts, USA
- Genre: Contemporary classical
- Occupation: Composer
- Instrument: Piano
- Years active: 1955–2017
- Website: Berklee Faculty Bio

Vuk Kulenović (21 July 1946 – 10 April 2017) was a Bosnian composer and teacher based in Boston, Massachusetts. He taught counterpoint, orchestration and directed study at Berklee College of Music. He composed and had commissions from around the world. His influences were wide-ranging, including jazz, Indian ragas, Balkan folk music, rock and many other contemporary styles. He wrote over 100 works for symphony orchestra, solo instruments, chamber ensembles, choral and vocal pieces, ballet, and scores for film and stage music.

== Life ==
=== Early years ===
Vuk was born in Sarajevo, Bosnia and Herzegovina, Yugoslavia in 1946 as the son of Skender Kulenović. He studied piano and composition at Ljubljana Academy of Music with Alojz Srebotnjak in Slovenia and later at Belgrade University with Enriko Josif. Later he studied in Stuttgart, Germany under Milko Kelemen. During his studies, the popular approach to composition was in 12-tone technique brought to the world by Arnold Schoenberg. This had little influence on Kulenovic and he wrote in the minimalist style before it was given then name and popularized by composers such as Steve Reich and Philip Glass. He taught at Belgrade University 1979-1990 where he himself received his Masters of Music.

=== Coming to America ===
In June 1992, Kulenovic organized a protest against the policies of Serbian president Slobodan Milošević in Belgrade, composed of musicians and artists, the first of its kind. Consequently, his actions were noticed by the media and put him in an unfavorable position with the government he was protesting against. After experiencing destruction of his property and receiving a call for execution by an extremist newspaper he, his wife, and two sons fled the country to the United States with a Fulbright scholarship provided by the New England Conservatory in Boston. After lecturing at local colleges in Boston (as well as other schools) he made the decision to make his home in Boston and began teaching at Berklee College of Music in the autumn of 1996. He continued to teach at Berklee and remain an active composer until his death in April 2017.

== Music ==
In Berklee Today of Spring 1997 Vuk is quotes as saying "my music was always closer to popular genres in a way. For instance, there are rock elements in my string orchestra piece Mechanical Orpheus and in Boogie, a piano concerto."

=== Thoughts on Electric Symphony ===
I’ve been a professor at Berklee College of Music for more than 10 years now; the piece is essentially a combination of many different musical styles. As I walked through the hallways of the school, I was constantly engaged by the sound of electric guitars or South American percussion instruments, synthesizers, and so on. Groups playing blues or bebop, in fact, all-possible styles of music. Berklee is full of those sounds. Before my time at this school, I was a professor at various conservatories; my academic background is indeed from those types of so called, “classical music” institutions. However, in many of my previous works over the years, I was already traveling into these different musical styles, from Indian ragas, different types of world music, even jazz and rock. One of my piano concertos, “War Boogie”, is maybe the most obvious example that comes to my mind, of a piece from my immediate past, which already dealt with these influences, not normally found in so called, “classical music”. The idea for the Electric Symphony itself came to me one morning as I heard a group of students playing electric guitars at Berklee; I immediately realized that I had to write for that instrument. It was in that same week that I began to compose the work. I ended up sending part of the unfinished score so that it would be considered for a grant; in the end, I received the largest possible amount for such a project within Berklee.

== Works (Incomplete) ==
=== Pieces for Solo Instruments ===
1. Boogie Piano Concerto
2. Vanishing Landscapes Concerto for Guitar and Orchestra (1994)
3. Concerto Grosso for Cello and String Orchestra (2001)
4. Adoration of Moon for chamber orchestra and solo violin
  (2005)

=== Film Scores ===
Here is a list of Films Vuk Kulenovic is given credit for from the Internet Movie Database.

1. Iskusavanje djavola (1989)
2. In the Name of the People (1987)
3. Kraljeva zavrsnica (1987)
4. Davitelj protiv davitelja (1984)
5. Dorotej (1981)
6. Covjek, covjeku (1973)

=== Other Films ===
1. South Africa: Beyond a Miracle (2001)
2. Prelude to Kosovo: War and Peace in Bosnia and Croatia (1999) (Co-composed with Alexis Gavras & Vedran Smailovic)

== Quotes ==
"Kulenovic is one of the most important and interesting composers working in the area -- or anywhere -- today." - Richard Dyer of the Boston Globe
