= Alma Soller McLay =

Member of the US team that prosecuted Nazi war criminals

- Born: December 28, 1919; Narrowsburg, New York, US
- Died: April 5, 2017; Torrance, California, US
- Occupation: Stenographer
- Known for: Member of the U.S. team at the Nuremberg trials after World War II

Alma Florence Soller McLay (December 28, 1919 – April 5, 2017) was a member of Robert H. Jackson's team that prosecuted Nazi war criminals at Nuremberg after World War II.

== Early life ==
Alma Florence Soller was born in Narrowsburg, New York, the daughter of George David Soller (1879–1928) and Margaret Slater Soller (1892–1990). She was raised on her parents' chicken farm with three older siblings, William, George, and Beulah. She trained as a secretary before World War II.

== Nuremberg trials ==
Soller began to work for the United States Department of Defense in 1941. At the end of World War II she met then U.S. Supreme Court Justice Robert H. Jackson, who asked her to join his team and document what would be the Nuremberg trials as transcriber, together with Elsie L. Douglas. Jackson's biographer, John Q. Barrett, said that McLay "probably never got the full credit she deserved for her work transcribing the testimony, often in various languages and in shorthand, and collating the evidence." The nature of the recording technology used in the trials made audio records fragile, and the stenographers' work more critical in documenting the historic process.

== Personal life ==
Alma Soller later married Stanley McLay, an Air Force colonel and industrial economist, and they moved to Rancho Palos Verdes, California in 1954. She had three children, Derek, Murdoch, and Alma. Alma Soller McLay was widowed when Stanley died in 1991; she died in 2017, aged 97 years, in Torrance, California. She was the last surviving member of the 18-person American team at Nuremberg.
