= Harold Lambert (physician) =

British doctor

Harold Philip Lambert, FRCP (2 May 1926 – 1 April 2017) was a British medical doctor and professor of medicine, known for his work dealing with infectious diseases and antibiotic therapy. He played a key role in the development of pyrazinamide as a treatment for tuberculosis and also did some of the earliest research into mescaline.

He trained at Cambridge University and University College Hospital, where, as a medical student, he witnessed the death of George Orwell from tuberculosis. In 1963, Lambert became consultant physician, and later the first professor of microbial diseases at St George's, University of London.

He was co-editor with Lawrence Paul Garrod and Francis O'Grady of the 4th (1973), 5th, and 6th editions of the important textbook on antibiotic therapy "Antibiotic and Chemotherapy". Lambert was also the co-editor of the 7th edition (1997) with O'Grady, Roger G. Finch, and David Greenwood. Lambert's main research interests were meningitis, respiratory infections, and the optimal use of antibiotics.

After retiring from clinical practice in 1989 he continued to be very active, serving on Meningitis Research Foundation's Scientific Advisory Panel as vice-chair and later joining our board of trustees and becoming the charity's medical advisor. He also continued to contribute a great deal to academic life at St George's – at seminars, lectures and Jenner Research Days. Harold and his wife Joan were also the creative force in establishing a Water Garden at St George's so that patients and their families could escape the hospital environment.

In 1955, in Marylebone he married Joan Richley (b. 1928). They had two daughters and a son.

== Selected publications ==
- with Robert M. McCune, Floyd M. Feldmann, and Walsh McDermott: McCune, R. M.; Feldmann, F. M.; Lambert, H. P.; McDermott, W. (1966). "Microbial persistence: I. The capacity of tubercle bacilli to survive sterilization in mouse tissues". Journal of Experimental Medicine. 123 (3): 445–468. doi:10.1084/jem.123.3.445. PMC 2138153. PMID 4957010.
- with Arnold Eley and T. Hargreaves: Eley, A.; Hargreaves, T.; Lambert, H. P. (10 July 1965). "Jaundice in Severe Infections". Br Med J. 2 (5453): 75–77. doi:10.1136/bmj.2.5453.75. PMC 1845384. PMID 14305371.
- with H. Stern: Lambert, H. P.; Stern, H. (5 August 1972). "Infective Factors in Exacerbations of Bronchitis and Asthma". Br Med J. 3 (5822): 323–327. doi:10.1136/bmj.3.5822.323. PMC 1785531. PMID 4403011.
- with Mark G. Thomas and Keith Redhead: Thomas, M. G.; Redhead, K.; Lambert, H. P. (February 1989). "Human Serum Antibody Responses to Bordetella pertussis Infection and Pertussis Vaccination". The Journal of Infectious Diseases. 159 (2): 211–218. doi:10.1093/infdis/159.2.211. PMID 2536779.
- with Robert S. Heyderman, I. O'Sullivan, J. M. Stuart, B. L. Taylor, and R. A. Wall: Heyderman, R.S.; Lambert, H.P.; O'Sullivan, I.; Stuart, J.M.; Taylor, B.L.; Wall, R.A. (2003). "Early management of suspected bacterial meningitis and meningococcal septicaemia in adults". Journal of Infection. 46 (2): 75–77. doi:10.1053/jinf.2002.1110. PMID 12634067.
