= Maria Zhorella Fedorova =

Austrian opera singer

Maria L. Zhorella Fedorova
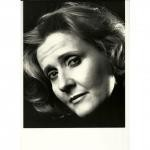
- Born: Maria Luise Brandstetter; November 8, 1915; Vienna, Austria-Hungary
- Died: April 21, 2017 (aged 101); Manhattan, New York, United States
- Resting place: Bratislava, Slovakia
- Other name: Maria Luise Zhorella Fedorova
- Citizenship: United States
- Occupations: Singer, singing teacher, political activist
- Years active: 77
- Notable work: Leading lyric soprano at the Vienna State Opera; political activist during World War II, opposing the Nazis; creator of The Zhorella Method of singing.
- Spouses: Eugen Fodor (m. 1940; died 1944) George Zhorella (m. 1954–1974)
- Parents: Frank Brandstetter (father); Luise Hubicki-Sas (mother)

Maria Zhorella (also known as Maria Luise Zhorella Fedorova; née Brandstetter; November 8, 1915 – April 21, 2017) was an Austrian opera singer, teacher of singing and political activist. She was a leading lyric soprano at the Vienna State Opera in the 1940s. As a political activist she was vigorously opposing Nazism in Europe during World War II. For three decades, she was a singing teacher in New York City.

== Childhood and education ==
Maria Fedorova was born in Vienna, Austria-Hungary, in 1915. Her wealthy and aristocratic parents were Luise Hubicki-Sas and Frank Brandstetter; They left Vienna and Maria spent part of her childhood in Bratislava, Slovakia, where her mother's family had roots. When she was five her strong-willed mother divorced Frank Brandstetter, despite society and the Catholic Church forbidding it. So Maria was raised by her mother's second husband, Emil Prat, whom she loved, in Vienna.

She recalled that Vienna, the "City of Music" resounded with waltzes and symphonies. During her childhood there was another music that also enchanted her, the trilling of birds. Their melodies would prompt her to get up, "when everybody was sleeping" and walk out onto her bedroom balcony where she would stand in the moonlight mesmerized by "the ideal, the singing of nightingales and other winged creatures...I was thinking about singing all the time...also Galli-Curci's voice was always on my mind- the sweetness, the lightness, the emotion..." Those avian vocal qualities remained her ideal, later influencing her teaching in America.

Although unusual for an upper class young woman, with her parents' support she began training in to be an opera singer in Vienna Her teacher, Wolfgang Steinbruch, "had the upper tones- I loved the sound. He taught me to sing with proper vocal technique- but with emotion! And he focused on the resonance, the vibration, and to always find the support. I loved this. He allowed me to fly!" A few years later, she was appearing on the radio performing Lieder and a cosmopolitan repertoire including folk songs in Slovak, German, Hungarian, and Czech. She was thus introduced to the repertoire that she used to teach "the upper tone" to students, and would often recall the great lieder singers whom she had known.

== First marriage, war experiences, and political activism ==
While studying voice, she married Eugen Fodor, a handsome fellow Slovak who encouraged her to pursue her musical career. Although Eugen had a high position in Bratislava's commerce and tourist bureau, his father was Jewish. After the Nazis took power in the region he was forced to flee to Sweden, leaving his wife to deal with the horrors of an oncoming world war. She remembered the period as one of privation and fear, but endured her hardships stoically, as she would often be forced to do later in life.

At the onset of World War II Fedorova became part of the underground, hiding Jews in her cellar, escorting them to safety and providing them with forged papers. During this period she was able to save her Jewish teacher, Wolfgang Steinbruch, from internment in a concentration camp. As a result of her activism she became a target for the Gestapo, who eventually imprisoned and tortured her. Only in her 90s did she relate her experiences to Holocaust historians, preferring to allude obliquely to the traumas inflicted on her by her German captors.

At the end of World War II Eugen Fodor became a diplomat and hoped to represent Czechoslovakia as it sought to become an independent, democratic country. Like many patriots he risked everything to bring freedom to his country as a Cold War gripped Eastern Europe. Tragically, the Soviet secret police learned of his whereabouts abroad and killed him as he making his way back by train to join Maria in Bratislava Maria's childhood villa in what was to become Communist Czechoslovakia was seized and her property confiscated, leading her to return to Vienna.

== Vienna State Opera ==
In 1944, at the age of twenty-nine, Maria was invited to join the Vienna State Opera, one of the premier opera houses in the world. At first she played small roles. Among those she most enjoyed was Lola in Mascagni's Cavalleria Rusticana, and particularly the fat, ugly cook with big bosoms and false teeth in Eugen d'Albert's Tiefland (The Lowlands). Her most frequent role was Aranka in Der Ziegeunerbaron. She sang with such notable male stars as Anton Dermotta and worked with Richard Strauss, then the city's leading dramatic composer. She remembered him as a mentor and inspiration to a young artist making her way on the stage. Her last performance was in May 1949.

Performing lighter works at Vienna's Volksoper, she became a favorite soprano of the operetta composer Franz Lehar. He cast her in the title role of his The Merry Widow (a role she did not originate), adding to her list of lyric heroines. When she played Angele in Lehar's Der Graf von Luxemburg the critics declared it her great breakthrough, praising her tremendous success in the role.

== Second marriage, close of her professional career, and move to the United States ==
As her operatic career blossomed, she married Georg Frank Zhorella, a Czech clerk who expected his wife to keep house rather than work. Moreover, Maria had come to associate the horrors of World War II with her early years in music. In 1949 the couple emigrated to the United States and settled in New York City, effectively ending her professional career as a soprano. With a few exceptions, such as her appearance on The Lipton Hour, where she sang the aria Vilja from The Merry Widow, she chose not to sing in New York. For reasons she chose not to relate she was compelled to look for work to supplement her husband's income. Throughout the 1960s and 1970s Maria Zhorella was a fact-checker and librarian for Time Magazine, working at headquarters in Rockefeller Center.

== Singing teacher ==
After her husband's death in 1974, and with the urging of friends, Maria began teaching voice from her apartment in Elmhurst, Queens. Music educators soon learned of her gift, and she was hired by the Yale School of Music to teach undergraduates as early as 1975. She used lessons from her original teacher, as well as principles from the Italian bel canto method, to fashion an unusual pedagogical regimen that did not encourage big, operatic vocal production, but rather a lyrical style more suited to lieder and light opera. She taught the Zhorella Method (as it came to be known) to students at SUNY Purchase and in her Upper West Side studio in Manhattan. Her teaching attracted singers from all over the world, especially theater and recording professionals who had "damaged voices" in need of repair. This third career, beginning in her sixties, sustained her for more than four decades. A remarkable survivor who lived for much of the twentieth century, Madame Zhorella remained active until a few weeks before her death on April 21, 2017, at the age of 101.

== The Zhorella Method ==
"Her style of teaching is one of infinite patience. And she is relentless and time and again would say, "Do it again, do it again- sing deep, sing back, sing deep, sing back". Once when we met at the Metropolitan Opera, she began giving me a lesson in the aisle. She asked, "Are you singing deep? Are you singing back?" And made me show her right there! She has changed my voice. Since I have established this technique with Maria I can sing and talk the night before and not be hoarse the next morning. And after five decades of performing, under Maria's tutelage I recently achieved my first high C, and did so with ease. Her method enables a singer's voice to stay young decades beyond what is considered its 'normal' life-span." (Cabaret and Concert Performer, Steve Ross, New York City, 2015)
