= Jonny Forsström =

Swedish painter (1944–2017)

- Born: 1944; Möckleby, Öland, Sweden
- Died: 2017 (aged 72–73)

Jonny Forsström (1944–2017) was a Swedish picture artist, sculptor, and filmmaker. He is best known for his pencil and mixed-media works.

== Early life ==
Jonny Forsström was born in Stora Möckleby, Öland, Sweden, but grew up in the mining town Malmberget, Lapland, Sweden. After leaving home, he moved to Alingsås and later to Trollhättan.

Forsström was prescribed eyeglasses at age six, which he later described as a sure sign of weakness in the 1950s that would rule out soccer and other typical physical children's play. However, Forsström explained that the glasses allowed him to see clearly, and he became a by-standing voyeur, able to take particular note of people's gestures.

Forsström worked many jobs after his school years. He worked as a sailor, shipyard worker, and in the hospitality industry in Gothenburg and Stockholm. Forsström described his vision of art as having given him hope and a new sense of freedom.

== Exhibitions ==
- 1990: Parafras Piero della Francesca, Konsthallen Trollhättan, Sweden
- 2006: Konsthallen Trollhättan, Sweden. Various oil, sketches, aquarelle and sculpture.

== Galleries exhibiting/represented ==
- Gabrielle Bryers Gallery, New York, USA
- Northern Light Ltd. California, USA
- Galerie Studio Four, London, England
- Gallerie Bleu, Paris, France
- Galerie Peuples et Continents, Bryssel, Belgium
- Art 76, Basel, Switzerland
- Galleri Otenti, Antwerp, Holland
- Galeri Arnesen, Copenhagen, Denmark
- Art Now Gallery, Gothenburg, Sweden
