= Raymond Han =

American painter (1931 - 2017)

- Born: September 29, 1931
- Died: April 18, 2017 (aged 85)

'White Peony and Korean Pot', oil on canvas painting by Raymond Han, 2006, private collection

'Flora', oil on linen painting by Raymond Han, 2003, private collection

Raymond Han, Plastic Variations VI, 2012, Oil on canvas.

Raymond Han was an American painter who was born in Honolulu, Hawaii, in 1931, and died in upstate New York in 2017. After study with Willson Young Stamper (1912–1988) at the Honolulu Museum of Art, Han moved to New York City and studied at the Art Students League of New York with Frank Mason (born 1921) and Robert Beverly Hale (1901–1985). Han lived and worked in upstate New York for the last period of his working life.

He was best known for his still lifes in the photorealism genre, but also incorporated the human figure as well as abstraction into his compositions. Han's work has been placed in the public collections of the Honolulu Museum of Art, the Munson-Williams-Proctor Arts Institute (Utica, New York), the Yager Museum of Art & Culture (Hartwick College, Oneonta, New York) and the Picker Art Gallery (Colgate University, Hamilton, New York), amongst others. Han was represented at various times throughout his career by the Robert Schoelkopf Gallery, Forum Gallery, and lastly and until his death by Jason McCoy Gallery, Madison Avenue, New York.

== Work ==
Han's oeuvre spans over four decades. He is best known for his carefully composed floral and object still life paintings, but he also introduced figurative elements into his compositions, as well as working with a series of abstractions. His subjects are rendered with a sensitivity to detail and palette in combination with precise delineation of objects and spatial relationships, evoking a mood of calm that permeates his entire body of work, whether it be a figurative or abstract piece. Han's work often draws an aesthetic comparison to a variety of classic references, such as Renaissance frescoes and the works of Giorgio Morandi or Nicolas Poussin.

== Selected exhibitions ==
=== Solo exhibitions ===
2015
Fenimore Art Museum, NY
1997
Museum of Art, Syracuse, NY
1995
Academy of Arts, HI
1982
Munson Williams Proctor Institute, Utica, NY

=== Group shows ===
2015
New York State Historical Association, Cooperstown, NY
2003
Arnot Art Museum, Elmira, NY
1999
The Contemporary Art Center of Virginia, Virginia Beach, VA
1997
The Discovery Museum, Bridgeport, CT
Southern Alleghenies Museum of Art, Loretto, PA
1996
Everhardt Museum, Scranton, PA
1990
Museum of Art, Ft. Lauderdale, FL
1988
Collectors’ Gallery, McNay Art Museum, San Antonio TX
1987
The Bayly Art Museum, University of Virginia. Charlottesville, VA
1985
Penn Plaza, New York, NY
