= Wolfgang Fürniß =

Economics Minister of Brandenburg
- In office 1999–2002
- Preceded by: Burkhard Dreher
- Succeeded by: Ulrich Junghanns

Personal details
- Born: 8 July 1944 Heidelberg, Baden-Württemberg, Germany
- Died: 21 April 2017 (aged 72)
- Party: CDU
- Education: University of Heidelberg
- Profession: Politician, Consultant

Wolfgang Fürniß (8 July 1944 – 21 April 2017), also spelt Fuerniss, was a politician from the Christian Democratic Union (CDU).

== Biography ==
Born in Heidelberg, Baden-Württemberg, Fuerniss studied at the University of Heidelberg, majoring in Political Science, English and History from 1966 until 1971. While in University, he was a member of the Young Union (Jungen Union), the youth organization of the CDU.

From 1973 until 1984, Fuerniss worked under Roman Herzog in State of Rhineland-Palatinate, in Bonn with the Federal Government and in State of Baden-Württemberg. After Roman Herzog moved to the Federal Constitutional Court of Germany (“Bundesverfassungsgericht”), Fuerniss continued to work under Lothar Spaeth in the State of Baden-Württemberg. Fuerniss was a council member of the CDU Faction in Wiesloch in 1984, but then became the Lord Mayor of the City of Wiesloch from 1984 to 1992.

In 1992, Fuerniss left public service to join SAP AG as the Senior Vice President of International Government and Corporate Relations. On behalf of SAP AG, he negotiated and pioneered the first Wholly Foreign Owned Enterprise (WFOE) in China in the early 1990s. He was also a member of the SAP China Board of Directors.

In 1998, Fuerniss campaigned for the Lord Mayor position for the City of Heidelberg, but fell short against Wolfgang Lachenauer and Beate Weber.

In 1999, Fuerniss was appointed Economics Minister in the State ('Land') of Brandenburg, Germany under Manfred Stolpe. He was responsible for development of business and industry in Brandenburg, which surrounds the German capital, Berlin. He was the chairman of the supervisory board of the new Berlin-Brandenburg International Airport (German: Flughafen Berlin Brandenburg International), set to be completed in 2011, and was appointed by the European Commission's High Commission for Economics, Committee for Reorganization and Privatization of IT, Media and Telecommunications for all European countries (1995–1999).

In 2002, Fuerniss resigned his Minister position after it was disclosed that he had accepted a private loan of 1.5 Mio UD$ from investors in the United Arab Emirates who had also won a bid for a microchip production facility project in Brandenburg.

In 2003, Dr. Fuerniss was appointed as a special economic advisor to assist with economic development and infrastructure projects in the Province of Sichuan, China; as well as being appointed as a senior partner to the China Council for Promotion of Investment and Trade (CCPIT).

On 11. March 2015 court proceedings against him started at Landgericht Heidelberg. Fürniß said that he has betrayed Friends with 500.000 Euro. On 15. April 2015 he was found guilty and sentenced to 3 years.

Fuerniss died in Hamburg on 21 April 2017.
