= María Luisa Ozaita =

María Luisa Ozaita Marqués (20 May 1939, in Barakaldo, Spain – 5 April 2017, in Madrid, Spain) was a Spanish pianist, harpsichordist, musicologist, conductor and composer.

== Biography ==
María Luisa Ozaita Marques was born in Barakaldo, Vizcaya, in Spain. She studied with Fernando Remacha, and continued her studies in Copenhagen with Leif Thybo and K.J. Isaksen through a MFA exchange scholarship. She also studied harpsichord in France with Kenneth Gilbert and at Darmstadt in Germany.

Ozaita performed internationally in Europe, North America and Eastern Europe, and her compositions have also been performed internationally. She lectured on music history, and published professional articles in magazines including Confutatis and OpusMusica and in the book Women in Music by Patricia Adkins Chiti. Ozaita also collaborated on the Spanish edition of Women in Music. She was a member of the La Real Sociedad Bascongada de Amigos del País and was the founding president of the Spanish Association of Women in Music.

== Works ==
Ozaita composed mainly chamber and symphonic works, but was also known for guitar compositions. Selected works include:

- Pelleas et Mélisande, opera with text by Pablo Neruda
- Prelude and Dance with four variations (1982)
- Suite, Op 61 (1991)
- Suggestions bowling alleys (1991)
- Microparts guitar [Suite] (1994): [I.] Prelude, [II.] Tambourin, [III.] Song, [IV.] Rags
- Nana (1999)
- Obscura lyrics (1999)
- Tribute to Bernard Shaw (2005)
- Prelude and mosaic, Op 65 (2005)
- Nice trio (2007)
- Suggestive Quintet (2007)
- Theme with Variations (2010)

Her compositions have been recorded in RNE (Radio Classic), including Tema con variaciones for piano.

== Death ==
María Luisa Ozaita died in Madrid on 5 April 2017, at the age of 77.
