= Bill DuBois Sr. =

American farmer and philanthropist (1916–2017)

William Irvin DuBois Sr. (25 September 1916 – 7 April 2017) was an American farmer, philanthropist, centenarian, Navy lieutenant commander and a state lobbyist. At the time of his death, DuBois was one of the oldest living persons in the Imperial Valley and one of the most successful water rights lobbyists in California.

== Early life ==
DuBois was born on September 25, 1916, in Orcutt, California to John Lamont DuBois and Isabelle Oakley. John L. DuBois emigrated from Tennessee in 1906 to work as an oil engineer. In 1913, he met Oakley, who worked as a school teacher for the children of oil field workers. Like DuBois, she was the oldest child of a Tennessee family.

=== Agriculture career ===
The DuBois family moved to El Centro, CA in 1918 when Isabelle's father, William Calvin Oakley, purchased 240 acres of sand dunes land. After cultivating the dunes to arable land, the family spent the 1920s growing citrus, raising hogs, and operating a dairy. The whole family initially lived in a raised canvas tent under a cottonwood tree, without electricity or running water. Later, a WWI surplus generator provided the family with electricity for the first time.

=== Education ===
DuBois attended grade school at Silsbee School. He graduated from Central Union High School in Class of 1934 (icfb.net, 2008) while working summers in a Sunkist packing shed. He pursued a degree in agriculture at University of Southern California and graduated with a bachelor’s in agronomy from the Voorhis-Kellogg Campus (later known as the Don B. Huntly College of Agriculture of Cal Poly) in 1943. For a time he was the oldest known living graduate from Cal Poly Pomona. In mid-1943 he completed Midshipman School at Northwestern University in Chicago and was commissioned as a Navy Ensign. In 1944, he completed submarine engineering school in Raleigh, North Carolina.

== Mid-life ==
=== Involvement in WWII ===
In 1944, DuBois assumed command of a Landing Craft Infantry ship and transported Marines and equipment in the South Pacific. He and his ship participated in the Battle of Leyte Gulf and the Liberation of the Philippines. After the war, he remained in the Ready Reserves for 24 more years and retired as a Lieutenant Commander in 1952.

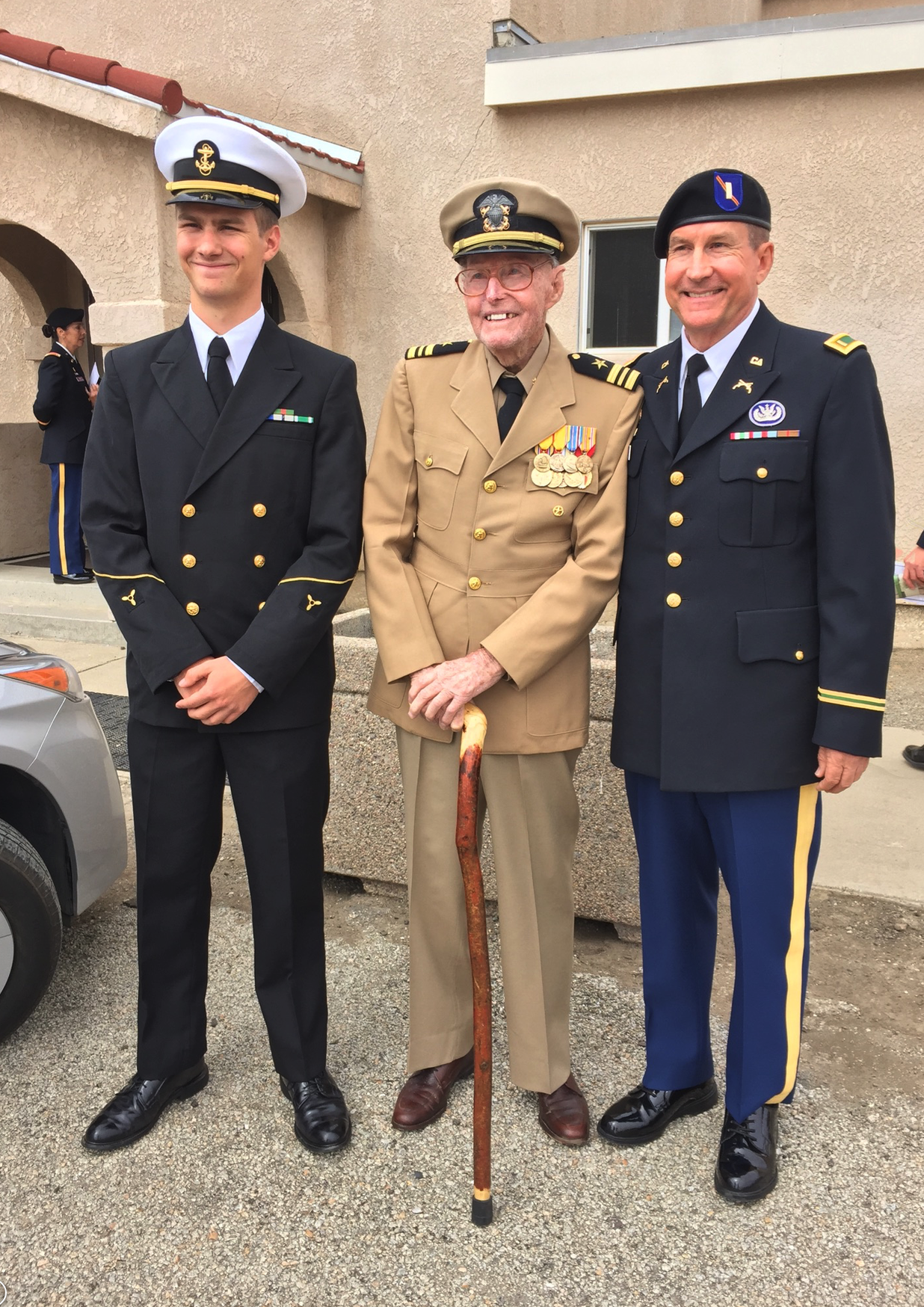
Bill DuBois Sr. (center) with his son 2LT Bill DuBois Jr. and his grandson CDT Will DuBois in August 2016

=== Careers ===
Upon honorary discharge from the Navy, DuBois farmed 2,000 acres of crops. By 1966, he also conducted a livestock feedlot raising up to 4,000 hogs at a time. Throughout the 1950s, he was on the Board of Directors of the [Holtville] Cotton Products Company and erected four cotton gins in the Imperial Valley. Starting in the 1970s, he leased his farmland to other farmers and moved to Sacramento to work for the California Farm Bureau Federation as its Natural Resources lobbyist. Upon retiring back to El Centro, he continued to be involved in water legislation and water and land-use politics. From 2009 until his death, he was a sought-after consultant for farming and water lobbying.

== Personal life ==
In 1946, DuBois married Mary Ellen (1922 – 1 September 2014) and had three daughters, Katy (b. 1944), Isabelle (b. 1947), and Lois (b. 1949) and one son, Bill Jr. (b. April 1954). His house is still located on the original family ranch property. To this day, the DuBois family still has the original signed deed of his ranch property. The adobe-brick house that he and his father built is still occupied and uses the original freshwater and sewer system from the 1940s.

=== Clubs and organizations ===
In 1947, DuBois joined the Board of Directors of the local Salvation Army and remained an active member until his death with many community friends. (Adami, 2013). He joined the El Centro Kiwanis Club upon his return home after his service in WWII and served as its President in 1956. His father had served the same club as President in 1932, and his son served the same club as President in 2003. DuBois remained an active member of the club until his death. While working for the California Farm Bureau Federation (CFBF), he was the director of natural resources and twice on the CFBF Board of Directors. He was the longest active member of the CFBF with a total of thirty-five years as a paid employee and consultant. He was the primary lead lobbyist on the Peripheral Canal project. His actions on this projects enabled the farming in the San Joaquin Delta, bring in more than $650 million in the local agricultural economy. While in the CAII, he organized and hosted the annual state convention on water rights in 1995. This state convention brought notoriety to the CAII for the first time since its creation.

== Recognition ==
=== Awards and honors ===
In February 2015, DuBois was honored for being the last living known person to have driven an automobile on the Old Plank Road. In 2004, he received the California Farm Bureau’s Distinguished Service Award, the highest achievement of a CAFB member. In 2005, he was named the state's "water guru" by the CAII in observance of his vast knowledge and wisdom in water rights lobbying.
