= John McMillan (Australian footballer) =

Australian rules footballer (1938–2017)

Personal information
- Full name: John William McMillan
- Born: 15 December 1938
- Died: 20 April 2017 (aged 78); Caulfield Hospital, Melbourne, Australia
- Original team: Hamilton Imperials
- Height: 198 cm (6 ft 6 in)
- Weight: 97 kg (214 lb)
- Position: Ruck

Playing career^{1}
Years	Club	Games (Goals)
1959–64	St Kilda	65 (26)
- ^{1} Playing statistics correct to the end of 1964.

John McMillan (15 December 1938 – 20 April 2017) was a former Australian rules footballer who played with St Kilda in the Victorian Football League (VFL).
