= Walter de Camp =

Finnish writer

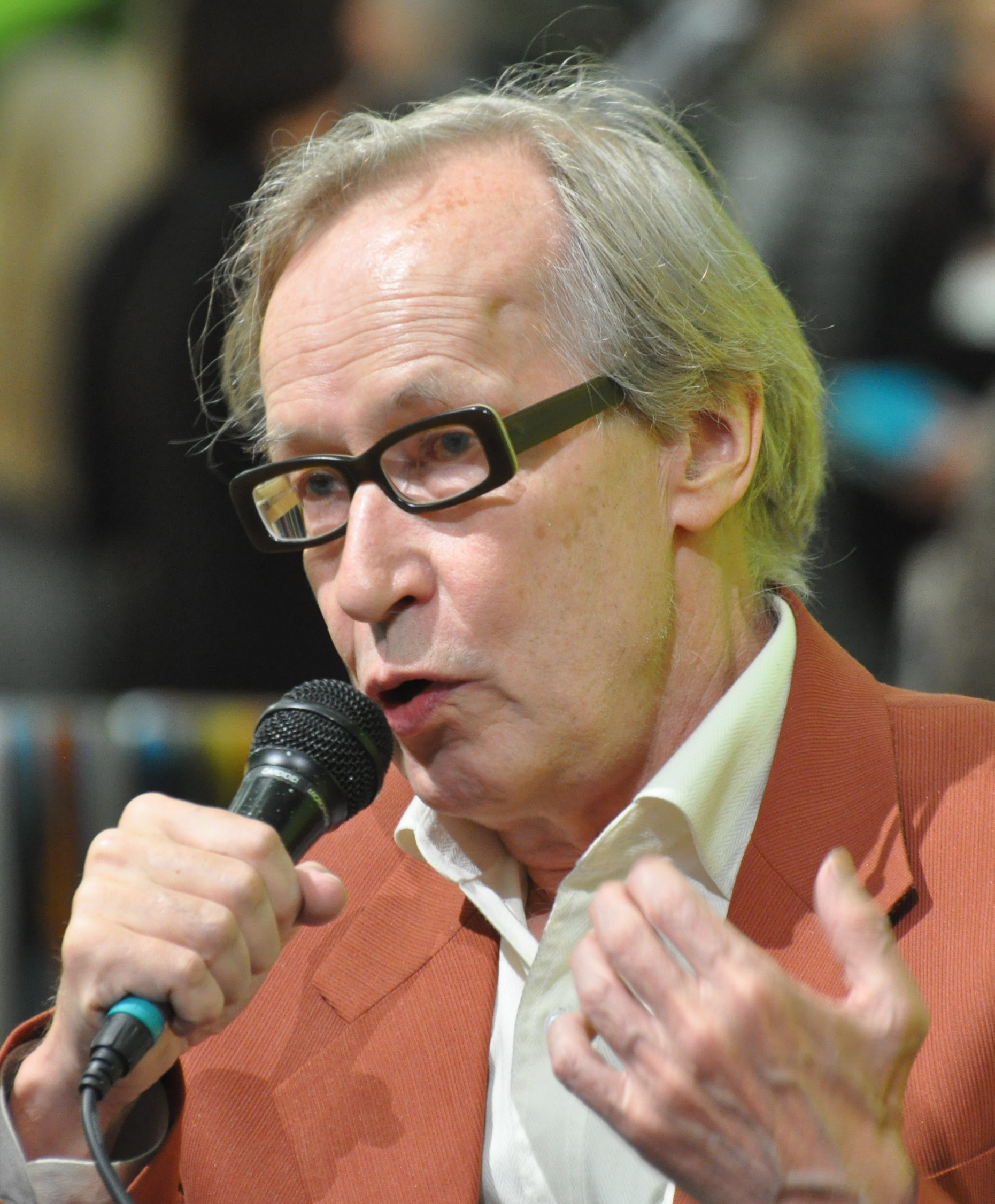
Walter de Camp

Walter de Camp (born Kari Lempinen; d. 5 April 2017) was a Finnish writer. He wrote about partying, restaurants and celebrities in the Finnish City magazine. There is also a drink named Walter de Camp after the writer. It was designed by Jasu Piasecki after the short description given by the writer: "It has to contain whiskey, be a short drink and taste really good."

== Bibliography ==
- 1997 Fetissikirja (Finnish for Fetish book)
- 2002 123 ja 1/2 ikuisuuskysymystä ja -vastausta kaupungin yöstä
