= Andreas von der Meden =

German voice actor (1943–2017)

- Born: 10 January 1943; Hamburg, German Reich
- Died: 26 April 2017 (aged 74); Hamburg, Germany
- Occupations: Actor; voice actor; musician; audio speaker; dubbing director
- Years active: 1948–2017
- Spouse: Brigitte Böttrich
- Relatives: Tonio von der Meden (brother)
- Musical career
- Genres: Jazz
- Instruments: Guitar; banjo; drums

Andreas von der Meden (10 January 1943 – 26 April 2017) was a German actor, voice actor and musician who was best known as the German dubbing voice for David Hasselhoff as well as Kermit the Frog in many Muppet productions.

== Biography ==
Von der Meden started off in 1948 working as a child actor at the Thalia Theater. He also made his first screen appearance in 1949 in a film directed by Gustav Fröhlich. Later on in life, he appeared in the 1959 crime film Der Andere as Roger Ford as well as the crime drama series Hamburg Transit.

As a voice actor, Von der Meden was renowned as the official German voice of David Hasselhoff, usually dubbing him in a majority of his work such as Baywatch in the role of Mitch Buchannon. He also became the voice of Kermit the Frog, first on Sesamstraße (the German Sesame Street co-production) and then in the German dubbing of The Muppets projects after the death of Horst Gentzen in 1985. He dubbed Harvey Keitel, Richard Pryor and Harry Anderson in some of their films. Von der Meden even served as a dubbing director for such German dubbed shows as Star Trek: The Next Generation.

As a musician, Von der Meden played the drums, banjo and the guitar. At the age of twelve, he was a drummer in Oimel Jazz Youngsters and he would later become a member of Old Merry Tale Jazzband.

=== Personal life ===
Von der Meden was married to actress Brigitte Böttrich. He was also the younger brother of actor and voice actor Tonio von der Meden.

== Death ==
Von der Meden died in Hamburg on 26 April 2017 at the age of 74.
