= Margery Wolf =

American anthropologist, writer, scholar, feminist activist

- Born: Margery Jones; September 9, 1933; Santa Rosa, California
- Died: April 14, 2017 (aged 83); Los Angeles, California
- Occupation: Anthropologist
- Known for: Numerous ethnographic works about women's life in China and Taiwan
- Spouse(s): Arthur Wolf; Mac Marshall

Margery Wolf (born Jones, September 9, 1933 – April 14, 2017) was an American anthropologist, writer, scholar, and feminist activist. She published numerous ethnographic works on feminism, Taiwan, and China.

== Biography ==
Margery Wolf was born in Santa Rosa, California, on September 9, 1933. As a child, she lived on Humboldt Street with her parents (Alvie Jones and Alvia Makee), before moving to a five-acre farm in California, and also in Taiwan, Ithaca, North Carolina and Iowa. Margery Wolf graduated from Santa Rosa High School at age 16 and graduated from Santa Rosa Junior College in 1952. She was enrolled in San Francisco State University from 1952 to 1953, where she married Arthur Wolf, with whom she moved to Ithaca, New York. Settling in New York State, she completed her art degree at Cornell University. In 1955, Margery Wolf began working as a research assistant to social psychologist William Lambert, coding ethnographic material as part of the cross-cultural Six Cultures project, which conducted field-based research on the upbringing and development of children on a variety of issues. She divorced her first husband in 1984, and later remarried Mac Marshall, another anthropologist.

== Education ==
Margery Wolf graduated from Santa Rosa High School at age 16. She received an associate degree from Santa Rosa Junior College in 1952, yet never obtained a graduate degree. She was enrolled in San Francisco State for two years (1952-1953).

== Career ==
In 1955 she became a research assistant to William Lambert, a social psychologist. She also worked under other anthropologists who recognized her talent and mentored her. Later in her career, she became the professor of the Department of Anthropology at the University of Iowa. She was also the secretary of the American Anthropological Association. Throughout her career, she wrote books about her experiences. Her first book, The House of Lim: A Study of a Chinese Farm Family, published in 1968, was about her time in Taiwan. This became her best known book. Later in her life she was hired by the University of Iowa as a Full Professor of Anthropology and Chair of the Women's Studies Program. She retired from the University of Iowa in 2001.

Women and the family in rural Taiwan was published in 1972 and examined the ways in which rural Taiwanese women related to men and other women in pursuit of their personal goals. Her 1986 book The Revolution Postponed: Women in Contemporary China explored the extent to which revolutionary communist China fulfilled the end of women's secondary role in legal, political, social and economic life. A Tale Thrice Told: Feminism, Postmodernism and Ethnographic Responsibility, which dates from 1992, was Wolf's response to the methodological issues raised by feminist and postmodernist critics of traditional ethnography.

=== Published works ===
- The House of Lim: A Study of a Chinese Farm Family (1968)
- Women and the Family in Rural Taiwan (1972)
- Women in Chinese Society (1975)
- Revolution Postponed: Women in Contemporary China (1985)
- A Thrice-Told Tale: Feminism, Postmodernism, and Ethnographic Responsibility (1992)
- The Orchards (2008)
- What the Water Buffalo Wrought (2013)
- Trouble at the U (2018)
- Coyote's Land: A Novel Ethnography (2018)

== Death ==
Wolf died of acute respiratory failure at Kaiser Hospital on April 14, 2017.
