= Dara Quigley =

Irish journalist and blogger (1980-2017)

- Born: 9 November 1980; Dublin, Ireland
- Died: 12 April 2017 (aged 36); Dublin, Ireland
- Occupations: Journalist, blogger, activist

Dara Quigley (9 November 1980 – 12 April 2017) was an Irish journalist, activist, and blogger.

== Life ==
Dara Quigley was born in Dublin, Ireland, on 9 November 1980 to Aileen Malone and Terry Quigley. She attended secondary school and was interested in science fiction. She nearly completed a physics degree at Trinity College Dublin but missed the final exams. She was a journalist and "prominent anti-water charge and anti-austerity activist".

Dara published a blog, "Degree of Uncertainty", in which she wrote about economic inequality.

== Death ==
In early April 2017 Quigley had what her mother described as a "psychotic episode." She was filmed on CCTV walking naked down Harcourt Street, a main thoroughfare in Dublin, and was arrested. A member of the Garda Síochána, the police force of the Republic of Ireland, went to the police station CCTV control room, rewound the video to the segment, and replayed it, using a phone to record the incident. The garda shared the video to a WhatsApp group that included only other gardaí. By 7 April it had spread to other internet locations and was viewed over 120,000 times. Quigley became aware of the footage's release while in rural Tipperary. On 12 April, Quigley died by suicide, aged 36.

The inquest was to take place in Templemore, County Tipperary in October 2019 but was delayed.

== Aftermath ==
In the aftermath of the incident, Quigley's death was cited as a symbol of needed reform and accountability in the Garda. Sinn Fein leader Mary Lou McDonald later addressed the Dáil Éireann, saying, "When we talk about Garda culture and reform and accountability, this is the rawest end...of a deplorable culture of humiliation and disregard for human beings."

In October 2019 the Irish Council for Civil Liberties appeared before the Oireachtas justice committee to argue for legislation that would outlaw the creation or sharing of images with a sexual or intimate content, require training of the Gardaí on the issue, and limit sharing of CCTV images.

== Garda response ==
In May 2017, the Irish Republican News reported that a garda had been suspended with full pay in response to the incident. As of August 2018, Quigley's family said they had yet to be contacted by Garda management. Also in August 2018, the Garda Síochána Ombudsman Commission confirmed that the garda accused of originally recording and sharing the video, who has not been publicly identified, would not be charged with a crime. Garda officials said the officer who recorded the video would face internal discipline, possibly to include suspension or dismissal, and that the officer who posted it to Facebook could also face disciplinary action. Quigley's mother was told that sharing the video "wasn't necessarily a crime." As of September 2018 a spokesman for the Garda said the investigation was ongoing and in early September Garda management confirmed the incident represented a breach of data protection law. As of October 2018 no inquest had been held.

In July 2019, Garda Síochána Ombudsman Commission (GSOC) finalized their report and submitted it to Garda Commissioner Drew Harris. A GSOC spokesperson said the report could not be shared until an internal disciplinary investigation was completed. As of October 2019 Quigley's family said they were still "battling the state" to learn details of her death.

As of April 2020, no determination of responsibility had been made.
