= Ion Degen =

Soviet-Israeli writer, doctor and medical scientist

- Ион Лазаревич Деген
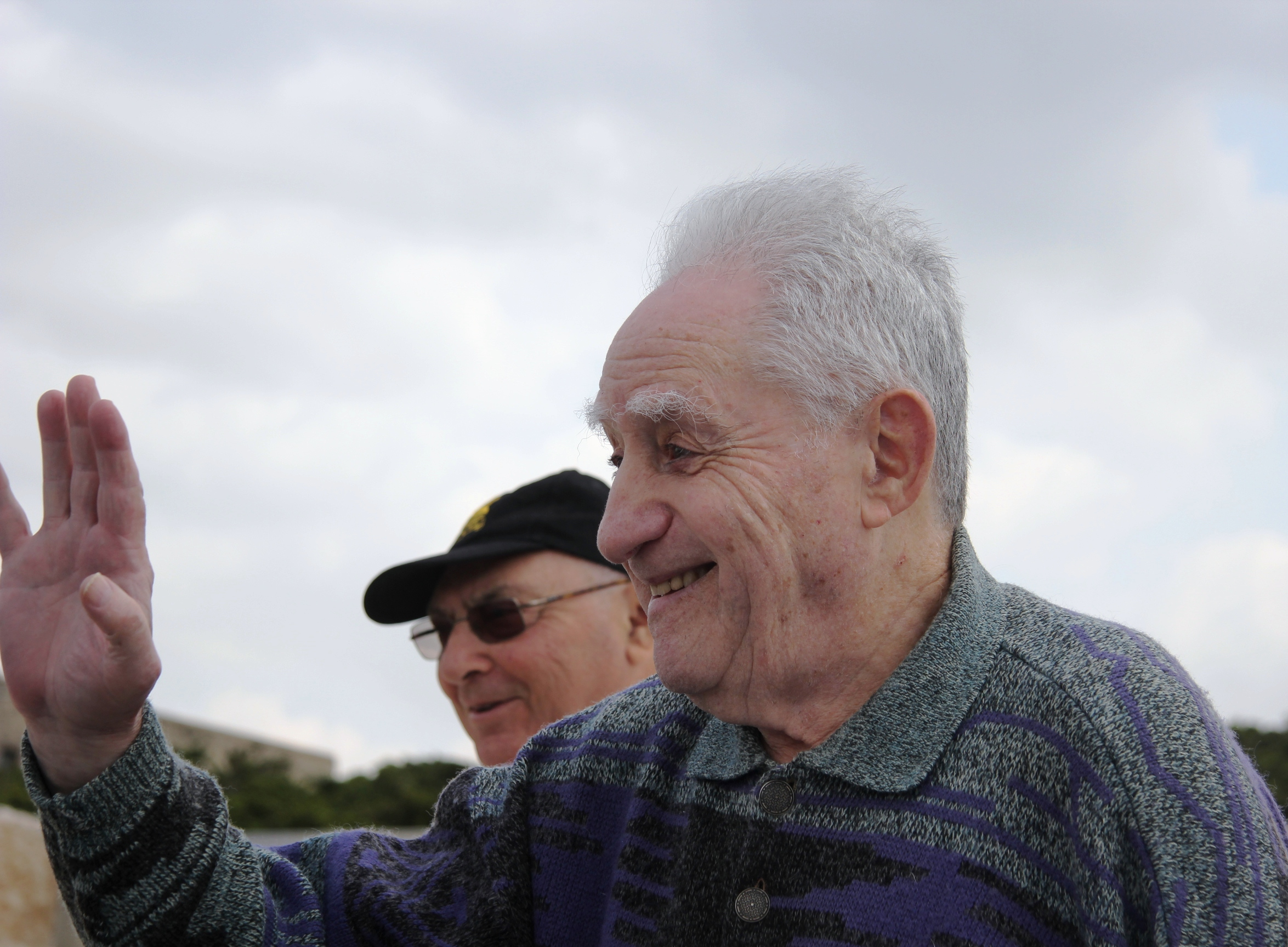
- Degen in 2015
- Born: 4 June 1925; Mohyliv-Podilskyi, Ukrainian SSR, Soviet Union
- Died: 28 April 2017 (aged 91); Givatayim, Israel
- Military career
- Allegiance: Red Army
- Service years: 1941–1945
- Rank: Guard Lieutenant
- Nickname: Lucky
- Awards: Order of the Red Banner, Order of the "World War" (1 st degree), two orders of the "World War" (2nd degree), medal "For Valour", the Polish Order "Virtuti Militari", "Cross of Grunwald" and Renaissance Poland.
- Other work: Medical doctor, writer

Ion Lazarevich Degen (Russian: Ион Лазаревич Деген; 4 June 1925, Mohyliv-Podilskyi – 28 April 2017, Givatayim) was a Soviet and Israeli writer, doctor and medical scientist in the field of orthopedics and traumatology. During World War II he served in the armoured troops of the Red Army. He obtained a Doctor of Medicine degree in 1973.

== Biography ==
=== Early years ===
Ion Lazarevich Degen was born in 1925 in the town of Mohyliv-Podilskyi in Ukraine, to a family of paramedics. His mother worked in a hospital as a nurse. At the age of 12 Ion began working as an assistant blacksmith. On 15 June 1941 he completed the ninth grade and started working as a counselor at a summer camp.

=== During World War II ===
In July 1941, Degen joined the Red Army as a volunteer. He fought in the 130th Infantry Division. At that time he got his first wound and was sent to the Poltava Hospital. He got lucky since he was able to avoid amputation of his legs.

On 15 June 1942, Degen volunteered to enroll in the Department of Intelligence of the 42nd battalion of armored trains, stationed in Georgia. This division consisted of two armored trains – "Siberian" and "Railroader of Kuzbass". The task for the division was to protect areas of Mozdok and Beslan. Degen became commander of the reconnaissance units. On 15 October 1942 he was wounded again while performing a mission behind the enemy lines.

After getting discharged from hospital, Degen became a cadet of the 21st training tank regiment in the city of Shulaveri. Later, he was transferred to the first Kharkov Tank School, in the city of Chirchik. In Spring of 1944 he graduated with honors and received the rank of a Junior Lieutenant.

In June 1944, Degen was appointed to be a commander of a tank during the 2nd Guards Tank Brigade, commanded by Colonel Yefim Evseyevich Dukhovniy. After the summer in 1944 in Belarus and Lithuania, for his survival he got a nickname "Lucky." Thereafter he became a commander of a tank platoon of T-34-85 tanks. Degen was a Soviet tank ace: he personally destroyed 12 German tanks (including one Tiger, 8 Panthers) and 4 self-propelled guns (including 1 Elefant), and several guns, machine guns, mortars and soldiers.

Degen was awarded the Order of the Red Banner, order of the "World War" (1st degree), two orders of the "World War" (2nd degree), medal "For Valour", the Polish order "Virtuti Militari", "Cross of Grunwald" and Renaissance Poland medals. He was twice nominated to the rank of the Hero of the Soviet Union, but was twice rejected because he was Jewish. Degen also suffered multiple burns and four injuries, in which he got twenty-two fragments and bullets. The last injury on 21 January 1945 resulted in a severe disability: an amputated leg.

=== A physician and writer ===
After demobilization from the army, Degen decided to become a doctor: "seeing the noble deed of doctors saving lives of wounded soldiers, I decided to also become a doctor. And have never regret the choice of this profession."

In 1951, Degen graduated from Chernovtsy Medical Institute and began to work as an orthopedist–traumatologist in Kiev Orthopedic Institute. He worked as a trauma orthopedist in hospitals in Kiev till 1977. He was fond of hypnosis, widely applying it in his medical practice.

On 18 May 1959, Degen conducted the first medical practice replantation of limbs – the forearm. In 1965 in the CITO (Moscow) he successfully defended his candidate dissertation on "Non-free bone graft in a round stem". In 1973 in the surgical board 2nd Moscow Medical Institute, he defended his doctoral dissertation on "The therapeutic effect of magnetic fields in some diseases of the musculoskeletal system" – the first in the world medical doctoral thesis on magnetic therapy. Degen authored more than 90 scientific articles, and guided eight people with their PhD work and two students with their doctoral theses.

In 1977, Degen immigrated to Israel, where for more than 20 years he continued to work as an orthopedist. He was part of the editorial board of the popular magazine "Voice of Disabled War", and a permanent consultant for Beit Aloha, a club for disabled veterans.

In addition to medicine, Degen enjoyed writing books. He was the author of: "From the house of bondage", "Verses from the tablet", "Immanuel Velikovsky", "Portraits of Teachers", "War never ends", "Holograms", "Nonfictional stories about the incredible", "Four years", "Poems", and "Heirs of Aesculapius". He also wrote short stories and essays, which were published in magazines in Israel, Russia, Ukraine, Australia, and the United States.

== Publications ==
=== Medical Publications ===
- Ion Degen Magneto-therapy. – Moscow: The practice of medicine, 2010. – 271. – ISBN 978-5-98811-141-2

=== Artistic and historical publications ===
- Ion Degen From the house of bondage. – Israel: Moriah, 1986.
- Ion Degen Portraits of my teachers. – Tel-Aviv: 1992.
- Ion Degen The war never ends. – Israel: 1995.
- Ion Degen Holograms. – Israel: 1996.
- Ion Degen Immanuel Velikovsky. – Phoenix, 1997. – S. 544. – (Trace in history.) – ISBN 5-222-00096-6
- Ion Degen Nonfictional stories of incredible. – Israel: 1998.
- Ion Degen The four years. – Israel: 1999.
- Ion Degen The black & white kaleidescope. – Hanover: 2009.
- Ion Degen Notes of a Lieutenant. – Kyiv: Publishing of Rainbow, 2009. (Republished in 2010)
- Ion Degen Heirs of Asclepius.
- Ion Degen Verses from the tablet Lieutenant Ion Degen.

=== The poem "My friend" ===
Written in December 1944:

Мой товарищ, в смертельной агонии
Не зови понапрасну друзей.
Дай-ка лучше согрею ладони я
Над дымящейся кровью твоей.
Ты не плачь, не стони, ты не маленький,
Ты не ранен, ты просто убит.
Дай на память сниму с тебя валенки.
Нам ещё наступать предстоит.

Literal translation

My comrade, in your death-agony
Don't call your friends in vain!
Instead let me warm my palms
Over your steaming blood.

Don't you weep, don't moan, You are no small child
You are not hurt, you have simply been killed.
Let me take off your boots as a keepsake,
For we shall yet have to advance.

Translation by Yury Nesterenko:

O my comrade, in your final misery
Do not call - all in vain - for your friends,
But instead, while your blood drains so easily,
In its steam let me warm up my hands.

Do not whine, do not moan, it's all flummery,
You are not wounded, you are just slain.
Let me take your felt boots in your memory -
We still must go to battle again.

Yevgeny Yevtushenko called these eight lines brilliant, stunning in a brutal force of truth. And have written a four lines reaction to the above poem:

Что сделал стих Иосифа [sic] Дегена?
Разрезал он острее автогена
все то, что называется войной,
треклятой, грязной, кровной и родной.

== Sources ==
- Autobiographical interview on the website, "I remember." (in English)
- Life and Fate Ion Degen (in Russian)
- Leon Kowal. The history of the disease of his right foot. (in Russian)
- "The fate of Jonah Deguène" Interview with the weekly newspaper "Tribune", 4 February 2010. (in Russian)
- "He was nicknamed" Lucky. " An article about Jonah Degen. " International Journal of Alef, in February 2010. Heading "Legends of the 20th century". (in Russian)
- 2013 interview with Degen, in English
