= Hector Acebes =

American photographer

- Acebes aged 93 holding a photograph of himself in Germany during World War II
- Born: Hector Acebes; 1921; New York City, New York, U.S.
- Died: April 22, 2017 (aged 96); Bogotá, Colombia
- Education: New York Military Academy, Massachusetts Institute of Technology
- Known for: Photography
- Notable work: photographs, portraits, film
- Spouse: Madeline Acebes
- Website: Hector Acebes Archive

Hector Acebes (January 2, 1921 – April 22, 2017) was an American photographer, notable for his expeditions to Africa and South America.

== Biography ==
He was born in 1921 in New York City, and spent most of his childhood in Madrid (Spain) and Bogotá (Colombia). He went on his first long-distance voyage at the age of thirteen, going 400 miles from Bogota to the city of Barranquilla when he ran from home to "sail around the world". He was trained at the New York Military Academy and served in the US army in World War II on the European front. He studied engineering at the Massachusetts Institute of Technology (MIT), and graduated in 1947. He married Madeline Acebes in Boston, and they had a son and two daughters. His first major photographic expedition was to North Africa in 1947. He embarked on a second trip to West Africa, specifically Timbuktu in 1949. Between 1950 and 1953, he embarked on several expeditions to the Orinoco River in Venezuela, and to other parts of South America. He went on his final, most extensive African expedition in 1953, going throughout the continent, from Dakar to Zanzibar. After this, he began a career as an industrial filmmaker for engineering projects throughout South America. In his final years, Acebes lived in Bogota and worked on creating the Hector Acebes Archive. He died in Bogota on 22 April 2017.

== Art ==
Acebes's African photographs are often viewed as a departure from colonial anthropologists such as Casimir Zagourski, in whose footsteps he followed. He himself rejected the label of "anthropologist", seeking to distance himself from its colonial connotations. The work of many previous photographers was often in service to the European colonization of Africa and sought to document Africans as colonial subjects, Acebes's portraits gave the subjects more agency to pose, express emotions and individuality, thus departing from this tradition to an extent. Acebes thus existed in a transitional area between colonial anthropologists, and concurrently emerging native African photographers such as Seydou Keita, in terms of the agency and depiction of Africans within his work.

== Collections ==
Hector Acebes's work is held in the following public museums and art galleries:

- Museum of Fine Arts, Houston
- Portland Art Museum
- Seattle Art Museum
- Lowe Art Museum (in Coral Gables, Florida)
- Binghamton University Art Museum
- Smithsonian Institution National Anthropological Archives (in Suitland, Maryland)
