= Billy Dunn (footballer, born 1920) =

English footballer

Personal information
- Full name: William Clayton Dunn
- Date of birth: 25 March 1920
- Place of birth: Hebburn, England
- Date of death: 21 December 1982 (aged 62)
- Place of death: Jarrow, England
- Position: Goalkeeper

Senior career*
Years	Team	Apps	(Gls)
1945–1956	Darlington	340	(0)
1956–19??	North Shields		
- * Club domestic league appearances and goals

William Clayton Dunn (25 March 1920 – 21 December 1982) was an English footballer who made 340 appearances in the Football League playing as a goalkeeper for Darlington.

Dunn was born in Hebburn, County Durham, in 1920, and served in the Royal Air Force during the Second World War. He joined Darlington as a centre half, but was tried in goal in October 1945, "played with confidence and skill", and remained with the club for a further ten years, making 355 appearances in league and cup. In recognition of his long service, Dunn was awarded a benefit match, against Leeds United in May 1956, before he moved into non-league football with North Shields. He died in 1982 in Jarrow at the age of 62.
