= Hate Man =

American philosopher

- Born: Mark Hawthorne; September 26, 1936; Washington, D.C. (or Maryland)
- Died: April 2, 2017 (aged 80); Kyakameena Care Center, Berkeley, California
- Occupations: Philosopher, reporter
- Employer(s): Peace Corps, US Air Force, The New York Times

The Hate Man (born Mark Hawthorne, September 26, 1936 – April 2, 2017) was an American philosopher, activist, and former reporter for The New York Times. His beliefs centered on people being honest about their negative feelings.

He was locally famous in Berkeley, California, where he lived since 1973. In the late 1970s he was a regular presence in upper Sproul Plaza on the University of California, Berkeley campus, and often gave speeches in Ludwig's Fountain. In addition to being known as "Hate Man", he was also called "Berkeley Baby".

== Career ==
Hawthorne was born in Maryland, raised in Stamford, Connecticut and graduated from Stamford High School in 1954 and from the University of Connecticut in 1958 with a Bachelor of Arts in English. While at UCONN he was Managing Editor of The Daily Campus, the University newspaper. Hawthorne was also a member of ROTC and received his commission in the United States Air Force upon graduation, subsequently serving at a Strategic Air Command base in Morocco. He also served as a Peace Corps volunteer. He started at The New York Times as a copy boy and worked as a reporter in the Metro section from 1961 to 1970 before he quit his job, divorced his wife, and "started being downward mobile".

== Philosophy ==
Hawthorne created a philosophy he called oppositionality, which is centered on treating people kindly even though one is in a bad mood. The reason he greeted people with "I hate you," he explained, is because saying, "I love you", is too often used as a form of manipulation. He created his own following. The group has a practice, initiated by Hawthorne, of pushing one another for what they want. Hawthorne indicated that this is about feeling out the other person's energy and communicating something to the other person about "where they are coming from". The idea is to avoid negative conflict by bringing such differences out in the open, rather than creating situations where people rob or con one another for what they want.

For a couple of years, he initiated a nightly "hate camp" drum circle at Sproul Plaza, where local people released their animosity. "Hate camp" was known as the camp that formed around him. Camping there made one a "hate camper", with a "true hate camper" being someone who believed in the camp and took an active role in helping the community it created.

A 2002 documentary about his life and philosophy entitled The Hate Man, Street Philosopher was shown in August 2017 after his death.

== Personal life ==
Hawthorne was married, but later divorced. He had two daughters.

He was homeless by choice.

He died on April 2, 2017, at the age of 80.
