= Chet Kalm =

American painter, teacher, and illustrator

- Born: December 30, 1925; Boston, Massachusetts, US
- Died: April 26, 2017 (aged 91); Great Barrington, Massachusetts, US
- Occupations: Painter; Teacher; Illustrator

Chet Kalm (December 30, 1925 – April 26, 2017) was an American painter, teacher, and illustrator. He was an instructor and administrator at the Parsons School of Design, where he also established the Foundation Department. His work was featured in more than thirty solo exhibits throughout the United States and Europe and displayed in galleries such as the Norman Rockwell Museum and the Everhart Museum.

== Early life and education ==
Kalm was born in Boston, Massachusetts and was enrolled in classes at the Boston Museum as a child. He studied with museum program staff until enlisting in the United States Army in 1942 and was injured during World War II, suffering permanent loss of use of his right hand.

After leaving the military, he began his education at Yale where he studied architecture. He changed to the School of Painting and later moved to Paris, France where he studied painting at École nationale supérieure des Beaux-Arts. He also studied graphics at Academie Colarossi prior to returning to the United States.

== Career ==
Kalm settled in New York City in the 1950s where he began to exhibit his paintings. He soon began to work full-time, painting and exhibiting his work. He also took a position with the Parsons School of Design in New York City where he had a 25-year career as an instructor and administrator. During his time at Parsons, he established and chaired the Foundation Department. After leaving Parsons, Kalm moved from New York City to the Berkshires in 1991 and began working out of a studio barn attached to his house.

Kalm illustrated numerous books during his career including The Postman's Pony, a 1960s children's book written by Isabel McLennan McMeekin. Additional illustrations include A Child's First Bible arranged by Sidney Brichto in 1961 and Paths to Jewish Belief by Emil Fackenheim in 1960, Kalm also illustrated the February 18, 1960, cover of The Reporter.

Kalm was featured in more than thirty solo exhibits throughout the United States and Europe as well as being represented in private and institutional collections. He received awards and recognition for this work including from the National Arts Club of New York, the Brooklyn Artists Club, the Kendall Fellowship, and the Silvermine Guild. His work has been featured at locations such as the Harrison Gallery, the Norman Rockwell Museum, the Everhart Museum, and the Berkshire Museum.

=== Select exhibitions ===
- 2010–2013, Koman Fine Art, Vero Beach, FL
- 2006, Berkshire Museum
- 2002–2011, Harrison Gallery, Retrospective in 2002
- 1995–1996, Southern Vermont Art Center
- 1993, Kosciuszko Foundation
- 1987, Gallerie Motte
- 1984–1987, Bergen Museum
