= John Maggio (pharmacologist) =

American pharmacologist

John Edward Maggio (1952/1953 – 15 April 2017) was an American pharmacologist.

He earned undergraduate and advanced degrees in chemistry from Harvard University. Maggio specialized in Alzheimer's disease and taught at the University of Cincinnati as Flor van Maanen Professor of Pharmacology and Experimental Therapeutics. He died in Hyde Park, Cincinnati, of cancer on 15 April 2017, aged 64.
