= Guy Ébrard =

French politician (1926–2017)

- Born: 13 July 1926; Assat, Pyrénées-Atlantiques, France
- Died: 17 April 2017 (aged 90); Aressy, Pyrénées-Atlantiques, France
- Occupation: Politician

Guy Ébrard (French pronunciation: [ɡi ebʁaʁ]; 13 July 1926 – 17 April 2017) was a French politician. He served as a member of the National Assembly from 1958 to 1968, representing Basses-Pyrénées (now known as Pyrénées-Atlantiques). He also served as the mayor of Oloron-Sainte-Marie from 1965 to 1976.
