= Fabrizia Mealli =

Italian statistician

Fabrizia Mealli (born 22 July 1966) is an Italian statistician at the University of Florence, known for her research on causal inference, missing data, and the statistics of employment. In 2013 she was named a Fellow of the American Statistical Association.

Mealli earned a laurea in economics from the University of Florence in 1990, and completed her Ph.D. in statistics at the same university in 1994. After postdoctoral research at the University of Leicester she returned to Florence as a faculty member in statistics.
