= Ray Chamberlain (musician) =

American musician

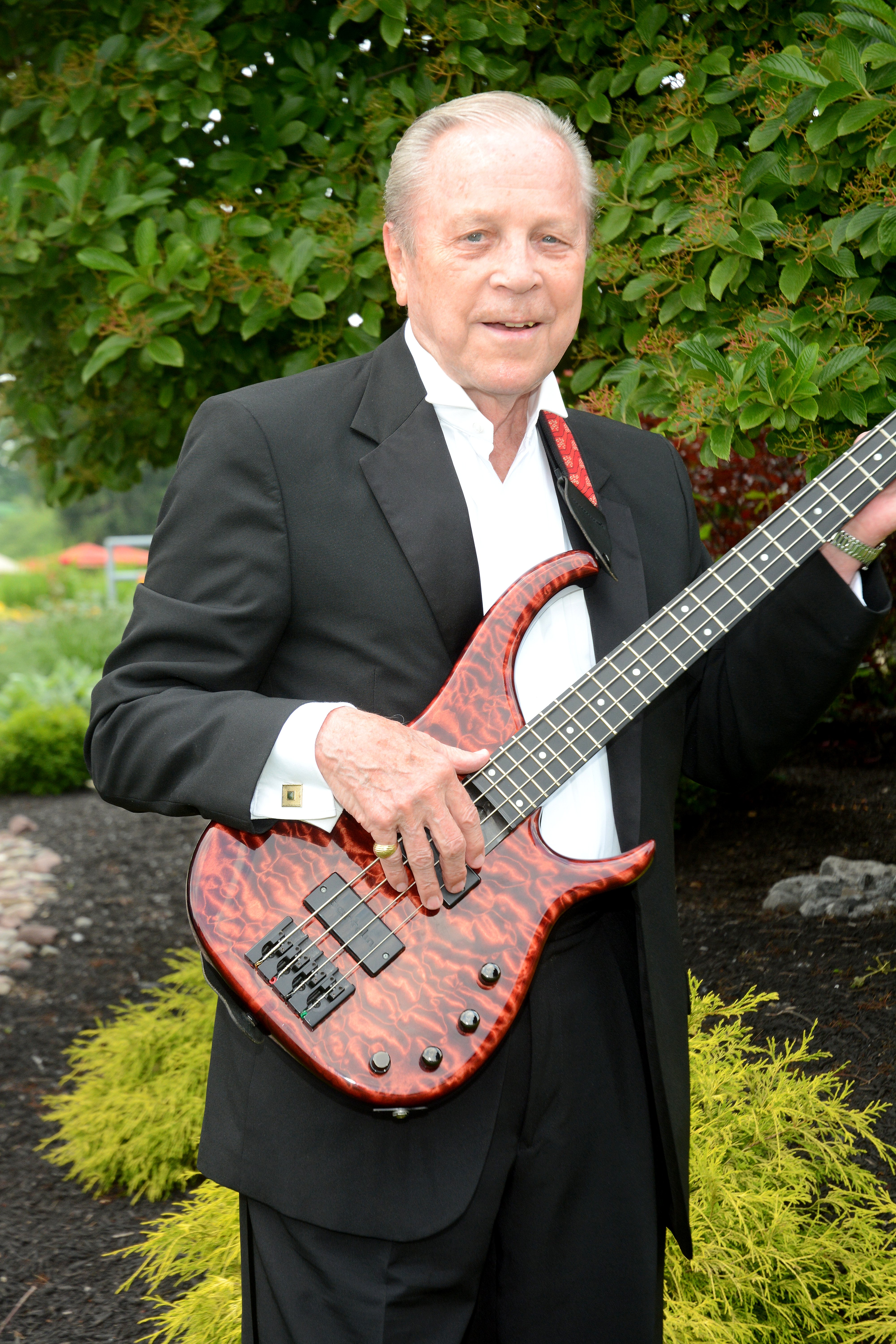

Background information
- Born: Raymond Alvin Chamberlain; March 6, 1930; Buffalo, New York, U.S.
- Died: April 12, 2017 (aged 87) Orchard Park, NY
- Genres: Jazz
- Occupation: Musician
- Instruments: Guitar, bass guitar

Ray Chamberlain (March 6, 1930 – April 12, 2017) was an American jazz guitarist and bassist born in Buffalo, New York. He graduated from Lackawanna High School in 1947, then enlisted in the Army, joining the 1st Army band as a Trombone player.

Due to a diving accident as a boy which injured two fingers, he switched from the guitar to bass in 1970. He worked and performed with such notables as Stan Kenton, Don Menza, Liberace, Jerry Lewis, Frances Faye, Larry Covelli, Frank Gerard, Sam Noto, Connie Francis, Andy Williams, Paul Anka and Teddy Charles. He studied with Guy Bucella, Harry Volpe, Billy Bauer, Allan Ruess and Howard Roberts.

In 2016, Chamberlain was inducted into the Buffalo Music Hall of Fame.

In addition to his music career, he worked in data processing management.

== Discography ==
- Renaissance I (Recorded at The Renaissance jazz club in Buffalo, NY - September, 1966)
- Renaissance II (Recorded at The Renaissance jazz club in Buffalo, NY - September, 1966)
