= Fabrizia Baduel Glorioso =

Italian politician

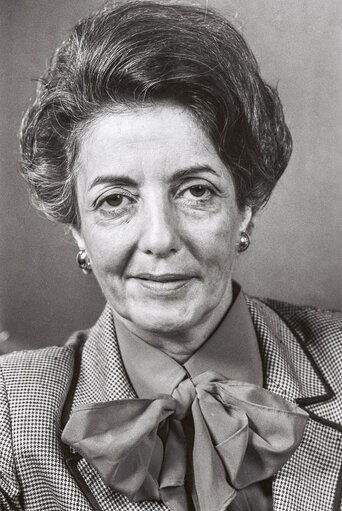
- Born: 2 July 1927; Perugia, Italy
- Died: 8 April 2017 (aged 89); Perugia, Italy
- Citizenship: Italian
- Father: Giuseppe Baduel
- Relatives: Ugo Baduel

Maria Fabrizia Baduel Glorioso (2 July 1927 – 8 April 2017) was an Italian politician, trade unionist and journalist, with a role in the European Economic Community (EEC). She was a member of the Italian Confederation of Worker's Trade Unions, the head of the office of International Relations of CISL, and an executive member of the International Confederation of Free Trade Unions.

== Biography ==
Maria Fabrizia Baduel Glorioso was born in Perugia on 2 July 1927. Her father was Giuseppe Baduel, an Italian entrepreneur of ceramics, and her brother was Ugo Baduel, an Italian writer, journalist and politician. She graduated from the University of Perugia Law School in 1953. From 1952 to 1965 she was a member of the Italian Confederation of Workers' Trade Unions (CISL). After that, she was appointed head of the Office of international relations of CISL from 1965 to 1978. She was an executive member of the International Confederation of Free Trade Unions (ICFTU) of the International Labour Organization (ILO). At the age of 89, She died in Perugia on 8 April 2017.

== Political life ==
Fabrizia Baduel Glorioso had an active role in Italian government, as well as European government. She took part in the creation of the European Trade Union Confederation and in the access of the Italian General Confederation of Labour (CGIL) in this organization. Baduel Glorioso was a member of the European Economic and Social Committee (EESC) of the European Economic Community as a representative of CISL from September 1970 to September 1976. In the same period, she was also a member of the Office of the Presidency of the EESC (September 1974 – September 1976). She was the first woman to be elected at President of the European and Social Committee. After the end of her term, she was a member of the European Parliament from 1979 to 1984. She ran for the European Parliamentary elections as a member of Italian Communist Party (PCI).

Fabrizia Baduel Glorioso was also a journalist specialised in Italian and European politic and trade-union. She was a founding member of the Institute International Affairs (IAI), the Institute for the relation between Italy and African States, Latin America and Middle East (IPALMO), the Italian Society for International Organizations (SIOI) and the Centre International Politic Studies (CESPI).
