= Deaths in July 2017 =

The following is a list of notable deaths in July 2017.

Entries for each day are listed alphabetically by surname. A typical entry lists information in the following sequence:

- Name, age, country of citizenship at birth, subsequent country of citizenship (if applicable), what subject was noted for, cause of death (if known), and reference.

== July 2017 ==
=== 1 ===
- Ibra Agbo, 30, Cameroonian-born Equatoguinean football player and coach.
- Aleshia Brevard, 79, American transgender actress and author, pulmonary fibrosis.
- Norman Dorsen, 86, American civil rights activist, president of the American Civil Liberties Union (1977–1991), complications from a stroke.
- Myles Frechette, 81, American diplomat, United States Ambassador to Cameroon (1983-1987) and to Colombia (1994-1997).
- Paul Hardin III, 86, American academic administrator (Wofford College, Drew University, UNC), amyotrophic lateral sclerosis.
- Þórir Jónsson, 90, Icelandic Olympic alpine skier (1948).
- Joseph Keke, 89, Beninese politician.
- Ernest Krings, 96, Belgian judge.
- Stevie Ryan, 33, American actress and comedian (Stevie TV), suicide by hanging.
- Ayan Sadakov, 55, Bulgarian footballer (Lokomotiv Plovdiv, national team), amyotrophic lateral sclerosis.
- Richard Gilbert Scott, 93, British architect.
- Nilu Doma Sherpa, 32, Nepali film director, heart attack.
- Sergio Sorrentino, 92, Italian Olympic sailor (1956, 1964).
- Stephen Tindale, 54, British environmentalist, suicide.
- Toshiharu Ueda, 80, Japanese baseball player (Hiroshima Carp) and manager (Hankyu Braves/Orix Braves).
- Orri Vigfússon, 74, Icelandic environmentalist, lung cancer.
- Heathcote Williams, 75, British author and actor (City of Ember), kidney failure.

=== 2 ===
- Ataullah Behmanesh, 94, Iranian wrestler and sports journalist, stroke.
- Tony Bianchi, 65, British author.
- Arne Börjesson, 92, Swedish Olympic racewalker.
- Jack Collom, 85, American poet, essayist and poetry teacher.
- Billy Cook, 77, British-born Australian footballer.
- Alfred G. Fischer, 96, German-born American geologist.
- Ron Fuller, 80, British artist and toy designer.
- Ryke Geerd Hamer, 82, German physician, charlatan and conspiracy theorist.
- Horace Harned, 96, American politician.
- Smith Hart, 68, American-Canadian professional wrestler (Stampede, WWC, IWE), prostate cancer.
- Abiola Irele, 81, Nigerian literary critic.
- John Major Jenkins, 53, American author and pseudoscientific researcher, kidney cancer.
- Gulab Khandelwal, 93, Indian poet.
- Minos Kyriakou, 75, Greek media and shipping magnate, heart attack.
- Vladimir Malaniuk, 59, Ukrainian chess grandmaster.
- John McCormick, 80, Scottish footballer (Crystal Palace, Aberdeen), dementia.
- Bob Perry, 82, American baseball player (Los Angeles Angels).
- Marjorie Rice, 94, American amateur mathematician.
- Chris Roberts, 73, German singer and actor, lung cancer.
- Bert Rossi, 94, English gangster.
- Michael Sandberg, Baron Sandberg, 90, British banker and life peer, Chairman of HSBC (1977–1986).
- Nirupam Sen, 70, Indian diplomat, Permanent Representative of India to the United Nations (2004–2009).
- Mel Shaw, 70, American racing driver, car crash.
- Pat Studdy-Clift, 90, Australian author.
- Madhukar Toradmal, 84, Indian actor, kidney failure.
- David W. Vincent, 67, American baseball author, official scorer and statistician (Washington Nationals, SABR, Retrosheet), stomach cancer.
- Tatiana Zatulovskaya, 81, Soviet-born Israeli chess player, Woman Grandmaster (1976), stroke.
- Fay Zwicky, 83, Australian poet.

=== 3 ===
- Ângelo Angelin, 82, Brazilian politician, Governor of Rondônia (1985–1987).
- Tom Blom, 70, Dutch radio and television presenter (Te land, ter zee en in de lucht).
- Patricia Cladis, 79, Canadian-American physicist.
- Manlio De Angelis, 82, Italian actor and voice actor.
- Henrique Medina Carreira, 85, Portuguese jurist and financier, Minister of Finance (1976–1978).
- José Luis Cuevas, 83, Mexican artist.
- Kevin DelGobbo, 53, American politician.
- Spencer Johnson, 78, American author (Who Moved My Cheese?), complications from pancreatic cancer.
- Theodore Kanavas, 56, American politician, member of the Wisconsin Senate (2001–2011), cancer.
- John Ssebaana Kizito, 82, Ugandan politician, Mayor of Kampala (1999–2006).
- George Levinger, 90, American psychologist.
- Sandy Mactaggart, 89, Scottish-born Canadian property developer and academic, Chancellor of the University of Alberta (1983–1994).
- Lloyd Noel, 83, Grenadian attorney, Attorney General (1979–1980).
- Joe Robinson, 90, British actor (Diamonds Are Forever, The Loneliness of the Long Distance Runner, Thor and the Amazon Women).
- Rudy Rotta, 66, Italian blues guitarist and singer.
- Solvi Stubing, 76, German actress (Nude per l'assassino).
- Maitama Sule, 87, Nigerian politician and diplomat, Permanent Representative to the United Nations (1979–2017).
- Jean-Jacques Susini, 83, French militant, co-founder of the Organisation Armée Secrète.
- Paolo Villaggio, 84, Italian writer and actor (Ugo Fantozzi, The Voice of the Moon, Ciao, Professore!), complications from diabetes.

=== 4 ===
- Bryan Avery, 73, British architect.
- John Blackwell, 43, American funk and jazz drummer (Prince), brain tumor.
- Aldine Calacurcio, 89, American baseball player (AAGPBL).
- Chen Xuejun, 98, Chinese physicist, Chinese Academy of Sciences.
- Gene Conley, 86, American baseball (Milwaukee Braves, Philadelphia Phillies) and basketball player (Boston Celtics), heart failure.
- Ji-Tu Cumbuka, 77, American actor (Roots, Blacula, Mandingo), cancer.
- Maria d'Apparecida, 91, Brazilian opera singer.
- Daniil Granin, 98, Russian author.
- John S. Palmore, 99, American judge, Chief Justice of the Kentucky Supreme Court (1966, 1973, 1977–1982).
- Ntuthuko Radebe, 22, South African footballer (Eupen), traffic collision.
- Carol Lee Scott, 74, English actress (Grotbags).
- Shen Panwen, 100, Chinese chemist (Academy of Sciences).
- Afërdita Veveçka Priftaj, 69, Albanian metal physicist and academic (Polytechnic University of Tirana), member of Academy of Sciences of Albania (since 2008).
- Masatoshi Yoshino, 89, Japanese geographer and climatologist.
- David Yewdall, 66, American sound editor (The Thing, The Fifth Element, Escape from New York), pancreatic cancer.

=== 5 ===
- John Harland Bryant, 92, American physician and public health pioneer.
- Keith Conners, 84, American psychologist, heart failure.
- Ray Daniels, 83, American television editor (The Streets of San Francisco, Hill Street Blues, Hawaii Five-O), kidney failure.
- Chris de Freitas, 68, Trinidadian-born New Zealand climatologist, cancer.
- Max Gergel, 96, American chemist.
- Pierre Henry, 89, French composer.
- Tim Hollier, 69–70, British musician and publisher, complications of surgery.
- Paul Hollingdale, 79, British radio personality (BBC Radio 2), cancer.
- John Karlsen, 97, New Zealand actor (Bill & Ted's Excellent Adventure).
- Johnny MacKenzie, 91, Scottish footballer (Partick Thistle, Dumbarton, national team).
- Joachim Meisner, 83, German Roman Catholic cardinal, Bishop of Berlin (1980–1988) and Archbishop of Cologne (1988–2014).
- Joaquín Navarro-Valls, 80, Spanish journalist, director of the Holy See Press Office (1984–2006).
- Diane Nelson, 51, American jockey.
- William Clark O'Kelley, 87, American federal judge, U.S. District Court for the Northern District of Georgia (1970–1996), cancer.
- Janice Pauls, 64, American politician.
- Irina Ratushinskaya, 63, Russian poet, cancer.
- Willi Reschke, 95, German Luftwaffe ace.
- John A. Robertson, 74, American law scholar and bioethicist.
- John Rodriguez, 80, Guyanese-born Canadian politician, mayor of Greater Sudbury (2006–2010) and member of the House of Commons (1972–1980, 1984–1993).
- Tinners Way, 27, American Thoroughbred racehorse, Pacific Classic Stakes winner (1994, 1995), euthanized.
- Andrzej Trzebski, 89, Polish physiologist.
- Mark Wilkinson, 66, English furniture designer, pancreatic cancer.
- Roger Wootton, 73, English aeronautical engineer and balloonist.

=== 6 ===
- Michel Aurillac, 88, French lawyer, politician and author, member of the National Assembly (1978–1981, 1986).
- David Alonso López, 39, Mexican boxer, shot.
- Håkan Carlqvist, 63, Swedish motocross racer, world champion (1979, 1983), complications from a brain hemorrhage.
- Willie Stevenson Glanton, 95, American lawyer and politician, member of the Iowa House of Representatives (1965–1966).
- Giovanni Bernardo Gremoli, 91, Italian-born Emirati Roman Catholic prelate, Vicar Apostolic of Arabia (1975–2005).
- Robert Grodt, 28, American volunteer medic (Occupy Wall Street, People's Protection Units).
- Les Habegger, 92, American basketball executive (Seattle SuperSonics).
- George Hansen, 83, Canadian football player (Calgary Stampeders).
- Joan Holderness, 84, American baseball player (All-American Girls Professional Baseball League).
- Nancy Jeffett, 88, American Hall of Fame women's tennis promoter.
- Melvyn "Deacon" Jones, 73, American blues musician.
- Landrú, 94, Argentine political cartoonist.
- Joan Boocock Lee, 95, British-born American actress (Spider-Man, Fantastic Four, X-Men: Apocalypse) and model, complications from a stroke.
- William Morva, 35, American convicted murderer, executed by lethal injection.
- Shu Nakajima, 69, Japanese actor (47 Ronin, The Emperor in August, Kagemusha), fall.
- Paolo Piva, 67, Italian architect.
- Thomas E. Sanders, 63, American production designer and art director (Saving Private Ryan, Braveheart, Crimson Peak), cancer.
- Heinz Schneiter, 82, Swiss footballer (national team).
- Arun Kumar Sharma, 92, Indian cell biologist.
- Galip Tekin, 59, Turkish comic book artist, heart attack.
- Frederick Tuckman, 95, German-born British politician, MEP for Leicester. (1979–1989).
- Diane Von Hoffman, 55, American professional wrestler (USWA), complications from knee surgery.
- Ken Wimshurst, 79, English footballer (Bristol City).
- Dom Zanni, 85, American baseball player (San Francisco Giants, Cincinnati Reds, Chicago White Sox).

=== 7 ===
- Ray Barnard, 84, English footballer (Middlesbrough).
- Jean-Pierre Bernard, 84, French actor (The Eiger Sanction).
- Pierrette Bloch, 89, French-born Swiss artist.
- Kim Burningham, 80, American politician.
- Chó do Guri, 58, Angolan author.
- Danny Daniels, 92, American dancer and choreographer (The Tap Dance Kid).
- Léonce Deprez, 89, French footballer.
- Pedro Juan Figueroa, 66, Puerto Rican actor (Dios los cria) and radio host, pancreatic cancer.
- Dorothy Fratt, 93, American painter.
- Egbert de Graeff, 80, Dutch Olympic hockey player (1960).
- Claude Hall, 83, American journalist and writer (Billboard).
- Werner Hamacher, 68–69, German literary critic.
- Guy Hatchi, 83, Guadeloupean-born French footballer (Sedan, Lyon, Marseille), heart attack
- Shlomo Helbrans, 55, Israeli rabbi and sect leader (Lev Tahor), drowned.
- Diego E. Hernández, 83, American military officer, Parkinson's disease.
- Johnson Kendrick, 25, Brazilian footballer (Al-Gharafa), shot.
- Georgy Koshlakov, 81, Russian-born Tajik politician and scientist.
- Daniel Lewis, 92, American conductor.
- Ahmed Mansi, 38, Egyptian SEAL military commander.
- Pam McConnell, 71, Canadian politician, member of the Toronto City Council (since 1998).
- Tony Moore, 69, English footballer (Chester City, Chesterfield, Grimsby Town).
- Egil Monn-Iversen, 89, Norwegian composer and pianist.
- James B. Nutter Sr., 89, American mortgage lender (James B. Nutter & Company), philanthropist (Children's Mercy Hospital) and power broker (Missouri).
- Ian Posgate, 85, English insurance underwriter.
- Marina Ratner, 78, Russian-American mathematician.
- Lala Rukh, 69, Pakistani women's rights activist and artist, cancer.
- Kenneth Silverman, 81, American biographer, Pulitzer Prize winner (1985), lung cancer.
- Alan Sisitsky, 75, American lawyer and politician.
- Gene White, 85, American football player (Green Bay Packers).

=== 8 ===
- Evan Armstrong, 74, British boxer.
- Siri Austeng, 73, Norwegian politician.
- David Bishop, 75, Canadian politician, MLA for York North (1974-1987).
- Gay Eaton, 84, New Zealand textile artist.
- Gustavo Ehlers, 92, Chilean Olympic athlete.
- Nelsan Ellis, 39, American actor (True Blood, Get on Up, Elementary), complications from heart failure.
- Richard Findlay, 73, Scottish broadcaster.
- Gour Ghosh, 77, Indian cricketer.
- Sterling Hambrook, 82, Canadian politician.
- Don Johns, 79, Canadian ice hockey player (New York Rangers).
- Bob Lubbers, 95, American cartoonist (Tarzan).
- Elsa Martinelli, 82, Italian actress (Donatella, Hatari!, The V.I.P.s) and fashion model, cancer.
- Joseph Ole Nkaissery, 67, Kenyan politician, MP (2002–2014), heart attack.
- Roy Richards, 33, Vincentian footballer (national team), shot.
- Jacques Vien, 85, Canadian politician.
- Seiji Yokoyama, 82, Japanese composer (Saint Seiya, Magical Taruruto-kun, Space Pirate Captain Harlock), pneumonia.

=== 9 ===
- Susanna Au-yeung, 63, Hong Kong actress (The Return of the Condor Heroes), lung cancer.
- Shaun Brogan, 73, British army officer.
- Gene Brucker, 92, American historian.
- Wally Burr, 91, American voice actor and director (The Transformers, Jem, Spider-Man).
- Naresh Chandra, 82, Indian diplomat, Ambassador to the United States (1996–2001), Governor of Gujarat (1995–1996), multiple organ failure.
- Eddie Crawford, 82, American football player (New York Giants), Alzheimer's disease.
- Clare Douglas, 73, British film editor (United 93, Tinker Tailor Soldier Spy, Bloody Sunday).
- Ilya Glazunov, 87, Russian painter.
- John McKnight, 86, Northern Irish Gaelic football player (Armagh GAA).
- Anton Nossik, 51, Russian writer and internet entrepreneur, heart attack.
- Neal Patterson, 67, American businessman (Cerner, Sporting Kansas City), cancer.
- Paquita Rico, 87, Spanish singer and actress (Let's Make the Impossible!, The Balcony of the Moon, Where Are You Going, Alfonso XII?).
- Bob Rogers, 83, American Olympic rower.
- Vappu Salonen, 88, Finnish Olympic gymnast (1952).
- Sumita Sanyal, 71, Indian actress (Anand), heart failure.
- Jack Shaheen, 81, American media critic, author and Arab tolerance campaigner (Reel Bad Arabs).
- Adolfo Taylhardat, 83, Venezuelan diplomat, President of the United Nations Security Council (1993).
- Robert Vigouroux, 94, French politician, Mayor of Marseille (1986–1995), Senator (1989–1998).
- David Wilstein, 89, American real estate developer.

=== 10 ===
- Peter Alfond, 65, American investor (Berkshire Hathaway) and philanthropist (Maine Medical Center), malaria.
- Jim Bush, 90, American Hall of Fame track and field coach (UCLA), prostate cancer.
- Augustin Buzura, 78, Romanian writer and journalist.
- Adam Clawson, 44, American Olympic slalom canoeist.
- Peter Härtling, 83, German writer and poet.
- Miguel Luna Hernández, 63, Mexican politician.
- John M. Jacobus Jr., 89, American art historian.
- Eugène Koffi Kouamé, 29, Ivorian footballer, heart attack.
- Prudence Nobantu Mabele, 45, South African HIV activist, pneumonia.
- Marama Martin, 87, New Zealand television and radio personality (Family Favourites).
- Emma Mashinini, 87, South African trade unionist.
- Leonardo Maugeri, 53, Italian oil and gas expert.
- Martin Molony, 91, Irish jockey.
- Isabelle Sadoyan, 89, French actress (Les fantômes du chapelier, Mayrig, Irreplaceable).
- Walter Orion Sheppard, 97, American politician.
- Paitoon Smuthranond, 86, Thai Olympian.
- Mangesh Tendulkar, 82, Indian cartoonist.
- Elvira Vigna, 69, Brazilian writer, cancer.

=== 11 ===
- Nicholas Biwott, 77, Kenyan agricultural businessman and politician, MP (1979–2007).
- George W. BonDurant, 101, American preacher and academic administrator.
- Dianne Brushett, 74, Canadian politician, MP (1993–1997), leukemia.
- Bill Chambers, 86, American basketball player and coach (College of William & Mary), Parkinson's disease.
- Joseph Fire Crow, 58, American Cheyenne flutist, idiopathic pulmonary fibrosis.
- Jeremy Dale Roberts, 83, English composer, prostate cancer.
- Jean-Claude Fignolé, 76, Haitian author.
- Abdul Rahman Ghaleb, Pakistani militant, air strike.
- Fikret Hakan, 83, Turkish actor (Revenge of the Snakes, Battal Gazi Destanı), lung cancer.
- Abdullah Hayayei, 36, Emirati Paralympic athlete, head trauma.
- Evzen Kolar, 67, Czech film producer (Never Say Never Again, Surf Ninjas, Inferno).
- John C. Quinn, 91, American journalist and newspaper editor (USA Today).
- Keisuke Sagawa, 80, Japanese actor (Barom-1), heart attack.
- Éva Schubert, 86, Hungarian actress.
- Pakkiriswamy Chandra Sekharan, 83, Indian forensic expert.
- Denis Mack Smith, 97, British historian.
- Jon St. Andre, 77, American Olympic ski jumper.
- Luigi Ferdinando Tagliavini, 87, Italian organist, harpsichordist, musicologist and composer.
- Gert Trinklein, 68, German footballer (Eintracht Frankfurt), leukemia.
- Imran Usmanov, 64, Russian Chechen folk singer.
- Buddy Wolfe, 76, American professional wrestler (AWA, NWA, WWWF).

=== 12 ===
- Chuck Blazer, 72, American soccer administrator, informant for the 2015 FIFA corruption case, colorectal cancer.
- Gerrit Braks, 84, Dutch politician, Minister of Agriculture, Nature and Fisheries (1980–1981, 1982–1990) and Education and Science (1989), Senate President (2001–2003).
- Tommy Carberry, 75, Irish jockey.
- S. Allen Counter, 73, American neurophysiologist.
- Joe Fields, 88, American record producer.
- Sam Glanzman, 92, American comics artist (Captain Willy Schultz).
- Liviu Giurgian, 54, Romanian hurdler, stroke.
- Thomas L. Haskell, 78, American historian.
- Allan Hunter, 94, New Zealand rugby union player (Hawke's Bay).
- Tamara Miansarova, 86, Ukrainian-born Russian pop singer ("May There Always Be Sunshine").
- Ray Phiri, 70, South African jazz singer and guitarist, lung cancer.
- Phillip Playford, 85, Australian geologist.
- Abd al-Majid al-Rafei, 90, Lebanese politician, MP (1972–1989).
- Paddy Randles, 92-93, Irish general practitioner.
- Tod Sloan, 89, Canadian ice hockey player (Toronto Maple Leafs, Chicago Blackhawks).
- Don Tykeson, 90, American businessman and philanthropist.

=== 13 ===
- Abdul Rahman bin Abdulaziz Al Saud, 86, Saudi prince.
- Américo Amorim, 82, Portuguese cork businessman (Corticeira Amorim).
- Charles Bachman, 92, American computer scientist.
- Keith Baird, 94, Barbadian-born American linguist.
- John Bernecker, 33, American stunt performer (Logan, The Hunger Games, This is the End), blunt force trauma.
- Chet Bowers, 82, American author and environmental activist.
- Paritat Bulbon, 46, Thai racing driver, suicide by gunshot.
- John Dalby, 88, English composer, singer and pianist.
- Nejat Diyarbakırlı, 89, Turkish Olympic basketball player.
- Vince Farrar, 70, English rugby league player (Featherstone Rovers, Sheffield Eagles, Hull).
- Giovanni Franzoni, 88, Italian writer and theologian.
- Fresh Kid Ice, 53, Trinidadian-American rapper, cirrhosis.
- Okay Gönensin, 66, Turkish journalist.
- James E. Gonzales, 83, American politician.
- Johanna Grund, 82, German politician.
- Anwarul Haque, 61, Bangladeshi judge, Supreme Court (since 2012).
- Simon Holmes, 54, Australian musician (The Hummingbirds).
- Giannis Kalatzis, 74, Greek singer.
- Egil Kapstad, 76, Norwegian jazz pianist, arranger and composer.
- Héctor Lechuga, 88, Mexican comedian, actor and radio personality (México 2000), heart attack.
- Liu Xiaobo, 61, Chinese writer and human rights activist, Nobel Peace Prize laureate (2010), multiple organ failure due to liver cancer.
- Joaquim Molins i Amat, 72, Spanish politician, member of the Congress of Deputies (1979–1986, 1993–2000) and Parliament of Catalonia (1988–1993).
- Andrews Otutu Obaseki, 91, Nigerian judge, Supreme Court (1975–1991).
- Gertrude Poe, 101, American journalist (Laurel Leader).
- Carl E. Reichardt, 86, American banking executive (Wells Fargo).
- Wolfgang Schmitt, 78, German Olympic boxer (1964).
- Derek Shiel, 78, Irish painter, sculptor, writer, and film-maker.
- Olive Yang, 91, Burmese opium warlady.

=== 14 ===
- Mahi Beamer, 88, American singer.
- Ronald J. Belanger, 78, American politician.
- Prunella Briance, 91, British natural childbirth campaigner.
- Frank G. Carver, 89, American scholar.
- Wm. Theodore de Bary, 97, American sinologist.
- Paul Ferreri, 69, Italian-Australian boxer.
- Ross Giudice, 93, American basketball coach (San Francisco Dons).
- Anne Golon, 95, French author.
- Julia Hartwig, 95, Polish writer and translator.
- Bert Hill, 87, English footballer (Colchester United F.C.).
- William "Hootie" Johnson, 86, American banker and sports administrator (Augusta National Golf Club), member of the South Carolina House of Representatives (1957–1958).
- Maryam Mirzakhani, 40, Iranian mathematician and academic, Fields Medalist (2014), breast cancer.
- Roland Moyle, 89, British politician, MP for Lewisham North (1966–1974) and Lewisham East (1974–1983).
- Clara (Cuqui) Nicola, 91, Cuban guitarist, professor and pedagogue, cardiorespiratory arrest.
- Kosie Pretorius, 81, Namibian politician, MP (1990–2005).
- Pedro Richter Prada, 96, Peruvian politician, Prime Minister (1979–1980).

=== 15 ===
- Anne Buttimer, 78, Irish geographer, president of International Geographical Union (2000–2004).
- Wesley Carr, 75, British Anglican priest, Dean of Westminster (1997–2006).
- Warrick L. Carter, 75, American music educator and executive.
- Agostino Cilardo, 69, Italian Arabist.
- Michael Cooper, 78, British economist.
- Justine Damond, 40, Australian woman murdered by a Minneapolis Police officer.
- John Haddox, 87, American philosopher.
- Josef Hamerl, 86, Austrian footballer (Wiener SK).
- William Hoyland, 73, English actor (Bill Brand, Hellboy, For Your Eyes Only), stomach cancer.
- James Kanno, 91, American politician, complications from a fall.
- Martha Kyrle, 100, Austrian physician.
- Davie Laing, 92, Scottish footballer (Heart of Midlothian).
- Martin Landau, 89, American actor (Ed Wood, Mission: Impossible, Crimes and Misdemeanors), Oscar winner (1995), abdominal hemorrhage.
- Louise Merzeau, 53, French academic.
- Babe Parilli, 87, American football player and coach (Boston Patriots, Denver Dynamite, New York Jets), multiple myeloma.
- Carol Pontzer, 63, American immunologist, brain cancer.
- Vjekoslav Vojo Radoičić, 86, Croatian painter, sculptor, printmaker and stage designer.
- Plaiter Reyes, 46, Dominican Republic Olympic weightlifter.
- Vladimir Tolokonnikov, 74, Kazakh-Russian actor.
- Robert Wears, 70, American physician, complications following surgery.
- Bob Wolff, 96, American sportscaster (Washington Senators).

=== 16 ===
- Nazem Amine, 90, Lebanese Olympic wrestler.
- Carlos Aro, 77, Argentine Olympic boxer (1960).
- Trevor Baxter, 84, British actor (Doctor Who, Maelstrom, Sky Captain and the World of Tomorrow) and playwright.
- Nar Bahadur Bhandari, 76, Indian politician, Chief Minister of Sikkim (1979–1984, 1985–1994), cardiac arrest following spinal surgery.
- Jerry Bird, 83, American basketball player (Kentucky Wildcats, New York Knicks).
- Joan Calabrese, 77, American fashion designer, uterine cancer.
- Martin Esmonde, 70, Irish hurler.
- Régis Gizavo, 58, Malagasy accordionist.
- Kim Hammond, 72, American judge (Seventh Judicial Circuit Court of Florida) and football player (Florida State Seminoles).
- Larry Keane, 85, Irish hurler.
- Wanda Lesisz, 92, Polish WWII resistance fighter.
- Tom Mitchell, 72, American football player (Baltimore Colts), lung cancer and diabetes.
- Zhibek Nukeeva, 22, Kyrgyz beauty queen, Miss Kyrgyzstan (2013), chondrosarcoma.
- Bill Pollack, 92, American racing driver.
- George A. Romero, 77, American-Canadian film director and screenwriter (Night of the Living Dead, Dawn of the Dead, Creepshow), lung cancer.
- Charles Rose, 96, New Zealand artist.
- Clancy Sigal, 91, American author and screenwriter (Frida).
- Cliff Whiting, 81, New Zealand Māori muralist, carver and teacher.
- Wilfried, 67, Austrian singer ("Lisa Mona Lisa"), cancer.
- Siegfried Wolf, 91, German footballer.

=== 17 ===
- Harvey Atkin, 74, Canadian actor (Cagney & Lacey, Meatballs, Law & Order: Special Victims Unit), cancer.
- Evan Helmuth, 40, American actor (The Devil Inside, Fever Pitch, Jobs), complications from a stroke.
- George Hill, 79, British-born New Zealand agronomist.
- John W. Holmdahl, 93, American politician, member of the California State Senate (1959–1967, 1971–1982).
- Sergio Pisano, 76, Uruguayan Olympic basketball player.
- John Potter, 93, British SOE agent and chemist.
- Raymond Sackler, 97, American physician and businessman.
- Saunders Schultz, 90, American sculptor.
- K. N. Shankara, 72, Indian space scientist.
- Carl Van Horn, 87, American racing driver.
- Hersh Wolch, 77, Canadian lawyer (David Milgaard).
- Marie-Josèphe Yoyotte, 87, French film and television editor and actress.

=== 18 ===
- Gustavo Alessandri Valdés, 88, Chilean lawyer and politician, Mayor of Central Commune of Santiago de Chile (1987–1989) and MP (1961–1965, 1969–1971, 1998–2002).
- Reg Biddings, 59, American basketball player.
- José Bragato, 101, Italian-born Argentine cellist, composer, conductor and arranger (Teatro Colón).
- Ben's Cat, 11, American racehorse, euthanized.
- Jean Murrell Capers, 104, American judge.
- François Dehez, 85, Belgian Olympic fencer (1956, 1960).
- Delia Graff Fara, 48, American philosopher.
- Andrzej Fonfara, 77, Polish Olympic ice hockey player.
- Max Gallo, 85, French writer, historian and politician.
- Mauno Hartman, 87, Finnish sculptor.
- Shigeaki Hinohara, 105, Japanese physician (St. Luke's International Hospital).
- Val Jeffery, 82, Australian politician, ACT MLA (2016).
- André Lafargue, 100, French journalist (Le Parisien libéré).
- John Archie MacKenzie, 82, Canadian politician.
- Ian Mason, 75, New Zealand cricketer (Wellington).
- Herbert Needleman, 89, American pediatrician and medical researcher.
- Pat O'Donahue, 86, American football player (San Francisco 49ers, Green Bay Packers).
- Andrew Paulson, 59, American executive (SUP Media), lung cancer.
- John Rheinecker, 38, American baseball player (Texas Rangers), suicide by hanging.
- José Luis Sánchez, 74, Spanish Olympic sprinter (1968, 1972, 1976).
- Dawn Seymour, 100, American air force pilot.
- Chris Sherwin, 55, English veterinary biologist.
- Red West, 81, American actor and stuntman (Walking Tall, Road House, The Wild Wild West), aortic aneurysm.

=== 19 ===
- María Amuchástegui, 64, Argentine television fitness presenter, ballerina and singer, stroke and lung cancer.
- Uma Bhende, 72, Indian actress and producer (Bhalu), heart disease.
- Miguel Blesa, 69, Spanish banker, Chairman of Caja Madrid (1996–2009), suicide by gunshot.
- Jake Butcher, 81, American banker and politician, financier of the 1982 World's Fair.
- Karel Franta, 89, Czech painter and illustrator, heart attack.
- Blaoui Houari, 91, Algerian singer and songwriter.
- Charles Weston Houck, 84, American jurist, U.S. District Court for the District of South Carolina (1979–2003).
- David E. H. Jones, 79, British chemist and author.
- Jordin Kare, 60, American aerospace engineer, complications from heart valve surgery.
- Évelyne Prouvost, 78, French businesswoman and magazine executive (Marie Claire), fall.
- Ralph Regula, 92, American politician, member of the U.S. House of Representatives from Ohio's 16th congressional district (1973–2009).
- John Ryals, 84, American politician.
- Fenwick Smith, 69, American flutist (Boston Symphony Orchestra).
- Mary Turner, 79, Irish-born British trade unionist.
- Joe Walters, 79, Scottish footballer (Clyde).
- Barbara Weldens, 35, French singer, cardiac arrest.
- Graham Wood, 45, Australian jazz pianist, bile duct cancer.

=== 20 ===
- Chester Bennington, 41, American singer and songwriter (Linkin Park, Dead by Sunrise, Stone Temple Pilots), suicide by hanging.
- David R. Brink, 97, American attorney, president of the American Bar Association (1981–1982).
- André Buffard, 91, French Olympic cross-country skier.
- Marco Aurélio Garcia, 76, Brazilian politician, heart attack.
- Grand Armee, 18, Australian racehorse.
- Stephen Haseler, 75, British academic.
- Andrea Jürgens, 50, German schlager singer, kidney failure.
- Jesse Kalisher, 55, American photographer, cancer.
- Bernhard Kempa, 96, German handball player and coach (Göppingen).
- Kenneth Jay Lane, 85, American costume jewelry designer.
- John McCluskey, Baron McCluskey, 88, Scottish lawyer, judge and life peer, Solicitor General for Scotland (1974–1979).
- Ben Portis, 56, Canadian artist and curator, traffic collision.
- Pudsey, 11, British performing dog (Britain's Got Talent, Pudsey: The Movie, Mr Stink), blood cancer.
- Joseph Rago, 34, American journalist (The Wall Street Journal), sarcoidosis.
- Claude Rich, 88, French actor (Je t'aime, je t'aime).
- Robbie Savage, 50, Namibian football mascot, diabetic ketoacidosis.
- Deborah Schiffrin, 56, American linguist.
- Peter Sears, 80, American poet.
- Jonathan Shurberg, 54, American attorney and politician.
- Jadwiga Szubartowicz, 111, Polish supercentenarian.

=== 21 ===
- Peter Doohan, 56, Australian tennis player, motor neurone disease.
- Anne Dufourmantelle, 53, French philosopher, drowned.
- Errol Dyers, 65, South African jazz guitarist and composer, emphysema.
- Howard Eichenbaum, 69, American psychologist and neuroscientist, complications of spinal surgery.
- Predrag Gojković Cune, 84, Serbian singer.
- John Heard, 71, American actor (Home Alone, Big, Prison Break), heart attack.
- Hasan Akbar Kamal, 71, Pakistani poet and writer.
- Nikolay Kamenskiy, 85, Russian Olympic ski jumper (1960), world championship silver medalist (1962).
- Yami Lester, 75, Australian Aboriginal and anti-nuclear activist.
- Geoff Mack, 94, Australian country singer-songwriter ("I've Been Everywhere").
- Jacques Nahum, 96, French television producer.
- Lonnie "Bo" Pilgrim, 89, American businessman (Pilgrim's Pride).
- Jon van Rood, 91, Dutch immunologist.
- Hrvoje Šarinić, 82, Croatian politician, Prime Minister (1992–1993).
- Kenny Shields, 69, Canadian singer (Streetheart), complications from heart surgery.
- Stubbs, 20, American cat, honorary mayor of Talkeetna, Alaska (since 1997).
- Soxie Topacio, 65, Filipino film director (Ded na si Lolo, Impostora) and LGBT activist (Quezon City Pride Council), lung cancer.
- Gary Waller, 72, British politician, MP for Brighouse and Spenborough (1979–1983) and Keighley (1983–1997).
- Deborah Watling, 69, English actress (Doctor Who, Take Me High, The Invisible Man), lung cancer.
- Paapa Yankson, 73, Ghanaian highlife musician.
- Clímaco Jacinto Zarauz Carrillo, 91, Ecuadorian Roman Catholic prelate, Bishop of Azogues (1990–2004).

=== 22 ===
- Fergus Allen, 95, British civil servant and author.
- Joyce Barnes, 91, American baseball player (AAGPBL).
- Margo Chase, 59, American graphic designer (Buffy the Vampire Slayer), plane crash.
- Jaroslav Doubek, 86, Czech Olympic speed skater.
- Piet Haan, 86, Dutch cyclist.
- Fritz Hellwig, 104, German politician and bureaucrat, European Commissioner for Research, Technology and Information Distribution (1967–1970).
- Polo Hofer, 72, Swiss musician.
- Marcel Kunz, 74, Swiss footballer (Basel, national team).
- Robert Loder, 83, English art collector.
- Akbar Makhmoor, 61, Pakistani poet.
- Edward Norfolk, 95, British Anglican priest, Archdeacon of St Albans (1982–1987).
- Ernst Ottensamer, 62, Austrian clarinetist, heart attack.
- Mathura Prasad Pal, 71, Indian politician, cancer.
- Shivajirao Girdhar Patil, 92, Indian politician, Padma Bhushan (2013).
- Rappin' Granny, 84, American rapper (America's Got Talent).
- Haddon Robinson, 86, American author and academic, interim president of Gordon-Conwell Theological Seminary.
- František Ševčík, 75, Czech ice hockey player (national team), Olympic silver medalist (1968).
- Kostiantyn Sytnyk, 91, Ukrainian botanist and politician, Chairman of the Supreme Soviet of the Ukrainian SSR (1980–1985).
- Artyom Tarasov, 67, Russian businessman and activist, first millionaire of the USSR.
- Willie Townes, 74, American football player (Dallas Cowboys), heart attack.
- Jim Vance, 75, American news anchor (WRC-TV), cancer.

=== 23 ===
- Santiago Abascal Escuza, 67, Spanish politician, deputy (2003-2004).
- Wenceslaus Anthony, 59, Indian-born New Zealand businessman.
- Reginald Arnold, 92, Australian racing cyclist.
- Thanasis Bebis, 88–89, Greek Olympic footballer (1952).
- Yuri Belov, 88, Russian painter.
- James Bynon, 91, British linguist.
- Elliott Castro, 68, Puerto Rican sports commentator and author, heart attack.
- Dave Cogdill, 66, American politician, member of the California State Assembly (2000–2006) and Senate (2006–2010), pancreatic cancer.
- Bob DeMoss, 90, American football player and coach (Purdue University).
- Simon Doggart, 56, English head teacher and cricketer (Cambridge University).
- Christine Donisthorpe, 85, American politician.
- Adebayo Faleti, 95, Nigerian actor, poet, journalist and writer.
- Thomas Fleming, 90, American writer and historian (American Revolution).
- Thomas Füri, 70, Swiss violinist (I Salonisti).
- Robin Gardiner, 70, English writer and RMS Titanic conspiracy theorist.
- Amir Fryszer Guttman, 41, Israeli singer, drowned.
- Dick Koppenhaver, 86, American football player and coach.
- John Kundla, 101, American Hall of Fame basketball coach (Minneapolis Lakers, University of Minnesota).
- Lau Wong-fat, 80, Hong Kong businessman and politician, member of the Legislative Council (1986–2016) and Executive Council (2009–2012).
- Jean-Pierre Le Bras, 86, French painter.
- Tom Lister, 73, New Zealand rugby union player (South Canterbury, Wellington, national team).
- Gennady Moiseyev, 69, Russian motocross racer, world champion (1974, 1977, 1978).
- Waldir Peres, 66, Brazilian footballer (São Paulo, Corinthians, national team), heart attack.
- Mervyn Rose, 87, Australian Hall of Fame tennis player.
- Jerry Rushing, 80, American bootlegger and actor, inspiration for The Dukes of Hazzard.
- Snooty, 69, American manatee, mascot of Manatee County, Florida, drowned.
- Flo Steinberg, 78, American comic book publisher (Big Apple Comix) and secretary (Marvel Comics), complications from a brain aneurysm and lung cancer.
- Vladimir Stipetić, 89, Croatian economist and academician, rector of the University of Zagreb (1986–1989).
- József Szendi, 95, Hungarian Roman Catholic prelate, Archbishop of Veszprém (1983–1997).

=== 24 ===
- Artur Almeida, 57, Brazilian journalist.
- Domingo Alzugaray, 84, Argentine-born Brazilian actor and journalist, founder of ISTOÉ, complications of Alzheimer's disease.
- B. R. Barwale, 86, Indian agronomist.
- Giovanni Bianchi, 77, Italian politician, MP (1994–2006), president of the PPI (1994–1997).
- Luis Gimeno, 90, Uruguayan-born Mexican actor (Mañana es para siempre).
- Michiko Inukai, 96, Japanese writer and philanthropist.
- Mehtab Kaur of Patiala, 94, Indian royal and politician, MP (1967–1971).
- Jørgen Kosmo, 69, Norwegian politician, member (1985–2005) and President of Parliament (2001–2005), Minister of Defence (1993–1997).
- Jack MacGregor, 84, Australian rules footballer (Fitzroy).
- Michael Manktelow, 89, British Anglican prelate, Bishop of Basingstoke (1977–1993).
- Naiyer Masud, 81, Indian Urdu short story writer.
- Niculae Nedeff, 88, Romanian handball player and coach.
- Yash Pal, 90, Indian scientist and educationist, Chairman of University Grants Commission (1986–1991), Padma Vibhushan (2013), lung cancer.
- Udupi Ramachandra Rao, 85, Indian space scientist, chairman of the Indian Space Research Organisation (1984–1994).
- Øivind Solheim, 89, Norwegian Olympic ice hockey player (1952).

=== 25 ===
- Guillermo Ahrens, 93–94, Peruvian Olympic basketball player.
- Hywel Bennett, 73, Welsh actor (The Virgin Soldiers, Shelley, EastEnders).
- Gretel Bergmann, 103, German-born American high jumper.
- Erzsébet Bognár, 75, Hungarian handball player, World champion (1965).
- Sydney Cohen, 95, South African-born British pathologist.
- Marian Diamond, 90, American neuroscientist.
- Gabriel Epstein, 98, German-born British architect and urban planner.
- Buddy Fletcher, 84, American politician, mayor of Lakeland, Florida (1993–2009), complications from a stroke.
- Michael Johnson, 72, American singer ("Bluer Than Blue", "Give Me Wings", "The Moon Is Still Over Her Shoulder"), songwriter and guitarist.
- Tarō Kimura, 52, Japanese politician, member of the House of Representatives (since 1996), pancreatic cancer.
- Marian Konieczny, 87, Polish sculptor (Warsaw Nike).
- Ivana Loudová, 76, Czech composer.
- Eric Moore, 91, Australian rules footballer (Fitzroy).
- Rula Quawas, 57, Jordanian feminist academic, aortic rupture.
- Luis María Ramírez Boettner, 99, Paraguayan lawyer and diplomat, Minister of Foreign Affairs (1993–1996).
- Barbara Sinatra, 90, American fashion model, showgirl and philanthropist.
- Billy Joe Walker Jr., 65, American guitarist and songwriter ("I Wanna Dance with You", "That's Why I Fell in Love with You", "B-B-B-Burnin' Up with Love").
- John Wraw, 58, British Anglican prelate, Bishop of Bradwell (since 2012), multiple myeloma.
- Geoffrey Gurrumul Yunupingu, 46, Australian Indigenous musician.
- Jean-Pierre-Dominique Zévaco, 91, French-born Malagasy Roman Catholic prelate, Bishop of Tôlagnaro (1968−2001).

=== 26 ===
- Suzanne Allday, 82, English Olympic discus thrower and shot putter.
- Paul Angerer, 90, Austrian conductor, violist, composer, and radio presenter.
- Magnus Böcker, 55, Swedish businessman (OMX, Singapore Exchange, Dustin), cancer.
- Robin Brock-Hollinshead, 88, British Olympic skier.
- Cool "Disco" Dan, 47, American graffiti artist, complications from diabetes.
- Patti Deutsch, 73, American comedian, game show panelist and voice actress (Rowan and Martin's Laugh-in, Match Game, The Emperor's New Groove), cancer.
- June Foray, 99, American voice actress (The Rocky and Bullwinkle Show, Looney Tunes, Cinderella), cardiac arrest.
- Leo Kinnunen, 73, Finnish racing driver (Interserie, Nordic Challenge Cup, Formula One).
- Leonard Landy, 84, American child actor (Our Gang).
- Hervé Le Roux, 59, French film critic and director.
- K. E. Mammen, 95, Indian activist.
- Max, 42, Brazilian footballer (Botafogo, AA Portuguesa, Vila Nova), cerebral edema.
- Jim Norman, 88, Australian rules footballer (Geelong).
- Frank Otto, 80, American academic.
- Sergey Petrosyan, 29, Azerbaijani-born Russian weightlifter, European champion (2007, 2008), drowned.
- Lawrence Pezzullo, 91, American diplomat, Ambassador to Uruguay (1977–79) and Nicaragua (1979–81).
- Ronald Phillips, 43, American convicted murderer, execution by lethal injection.
- Giovan Battista Pichierri, 74, Italian Roman Catholic prelate, Archbishop of Trani-Barletta-Bisceglie (since 1999).
- Keith Simons, 63, American football player (Kansas City Chiefs).
- Lyle Smith, 101, American football coach (Boise State Broncos).
- Helmut Thieltges, 61, German chef.
- Joachim Vobbe, 70, German Old Catholic prelate, Bishop of the Old Catholics in Germany (1995–2009).
- Peter Wende, 81, German historian.
- Jimmy White, 75, English footballer (AFC Bournemouth, Portsmouth, Gillingham).
- Ramón Xirau, 93, Spanish-born Mexican poet, philosopher and literary critic.

=== 27 ===
- Johnny Brandon, 92, English singer and songwriter.
- Cena N641, American Labrador retriever therapy and bomb detection dog, euthanized.
- Perivaldo Dantas, 64, Brazilian footballer (Botafogo, São Paulo, national team), pneumonia.
- John DeCamp, 76, American politician and lawyer.
- Abdelmajid Dolmy, 64, Moroccan footballer (Raja Casablanca, Olympique de Casablanca, national team).
- Michel Durafour, 97, French politician.
- H. A. Hargreaves, 89, Canadian science fiction writer.
- Stan Hart, 88, American comics and comedy writer (Mad), progressive supranuclear palsy.
- Eustace John, 78, Nevisian politician, Deputy Governor-General (1992–2017).
- Kim Weon-kee, 55, South Korean wrestler, Olympic gold medalist (1984), heart attack.
- Cheri Maples, 64, American police officer and peace activist, infection.
- Red Martin, 79, American Olympic ice hockey player (1964).
- Valery Maslov, 77, Russian football and bandy player and coach, stroke.
- D. L. Menard, 85, American Cajun musician.
- Ovidio Messa, 64, Bolivian footballer, pancreatic cancer.
- Mario Tullio Montano, 73, Italian fencer, Olympic champion (1972) and silver medalist (1976).
- George B. Rabb, 87, American zoologist.
- Manfred Rummel, 79, German football player and coach.
- Manik Sanyal, 81, Indian politician.
- Sam Shepard, 73, American playwright (Buried Child) and actor (The Right Stuff, Black Hawk Down), Pulitzer Prize winner (1979), complications from ALS.
- Dharam Singh, 80, Indian politician, Chief Minister of Karnataka (2004–2006).
- Marty Sklar, 83, American businessman (Walt Disney Imagineering).
- Gilles Tremblay, 84, Canadian composer, professor at Conservatoire de musique du Québec à Montréal (since 1962).
- Peter Wegner, 84, Austrian-born American computer scientist.

=== 28 ===
- Samson Abioye, 26, Nigerian computer programmer.
- Edward Allcard, 102, British architect and yachtsman.
- Enzo Bettiza, 90, Yugoslav-born Italian novelist, journalist (Il Giornale) and politician, Senator (1976–1979) and MEP (1979–1994).
- José Vicente Beviá Pastor, 83, Spanish politician, member (1979–2000) and Deputy Speaker of Congress of Deputies (1993–1996), Senator (1977–1979).
- James Egan, 88, Australian artist.
- Maurice Filion, 85, Canadian ice hockey executive and coach (Quebec Nordiques).
- Runa Førde, 84, Norwegian painter and illustrator.
- Charlie Gard, 11 months, British infant, subject of life support and parental rights case, MDDS.
- Håvard Holm, 73, Norwegian civil servant.
- Inder Kumar, 43, Indian actor (Wanted, Tumko Na Bhool Paayenge, Kahin Pyaar Na Ho Jaaye), heart attack.
- Inga Lantz, 74, Swedish politician, MP (1973–1988).
- Stein Mehren, 82, Norwegian poet, essayist and playwright.
- Siegfried Meister, 78, German executive (Rational AG).
- John G. Morris, 100, American photo editor (Life, The New York Times, Ladies' Home Journal).
- Derek Nippard, 86, English football referee.
- Gösta Peterson, 94, Swedish fashion photographer.
- Mamy Rakotoarivelo, Malagasy politician, Minister of Communications (2002), shot.
- Janet Sape, 58, Papua New Guinean netball player and sports administrator.
- Rosemary Anne Sisson, 93, British author and scriptwriter.
- Warren Keith Urbom, 91, American judge, Judge of the U.S. District Court for the District of Nebraska (1970–1990).

=== 29 ===
- Eunice de Souza, 76, Indian poet and novelist.
- Dave Grayson, 78, American football player (Oakland Raiders).
- Sophie Huet, 64, French journalist (L'Aurore, Le Figaro).
- Media Kashigar, 61, Iranian author and translator, pulmonary disease.
- Werner Kirsch, 79, German Olympic boxer.
- Redha Malek, 85, Algerian politician and diplomat, Prime Minister (1993–1994).
- Charley Marouani, 90, Tunisian impresario and talent agent.
- Georges Martin, 87, French automotive engineer.
- Lee May, 74, American baseball player (Cincinnati Reds, Houston Astros, Baltimore Orioles), heart disease.
- José Osvaldo de Meira Penna, 100, Brazilian diplomat and writer.
- Yuri Alekseevich Ryzhov, 86, Soviet and Russian scientist and politician.
- Olivier Strebelle, 90, Belgian sculptor.
- Piotr S. Wandycz, 93, Polish-American historian, president of the Polish Institute of Arts and Sciences of America and professor emeritus (Yale University).
- Stephen T. Worland, 94, American economist.

=== 30 ===
- Tato Cifuentes, 91, Chilean comedian, actor, ventriloquist and singer, pneumonia.
- Ciro Cirillo, 96, Italian politician and kidnapping victim, president of the Province of Naples (1969–1975) and Campania (1979–1980).
- H. Sayeeduddin Dagar, 78, Indian Dhrupad singer.
- Graham Foley, 94, English Anglican clergyman, Bishop of Reading (1982–1989).
- Earl Gage Jr., 90, American firefighter.
- Paulo Garcia, 58, Brazilian neurosurgeon and politician, Mayor of Goiânia (2010–2016), heart attack.
- S. Nainar Kulasekaran, 92–93, Indian environmentalist.
- Slim Mahfoudh, 75, Tunisian actor (L'Étoile du Nord).
- Charlie Tagawa, 81, Japanese-born American banjoist.
- Steadman Upham, 68, American archaeologist, college professor and president (University of Tulsa).
- Anton Vratuša, 102, Slovenian politician and diplomat, Prime Minister (1978–1980) and Yugoslavia's ambassador to the United Nations (1967–1969).

=== 31 ===
- Ray Albright, 83, American banker and politician, member of the Tennessee State Senate (1971–1994) and House of Representatives (1967–1971).
- Nigel Beard, 80, British politician, MP for Bexleyheath and Crayford (1997–2005).
- Jean-Claude Bouillon, 75, French comedian and actor (Child of the Night).
- Alan Cameron, 79, British classicist and academic.
- Max Day, 101, Australian ecologist.
- Jérôme Golmard, 43, French tennis player, complications from ALS.
- Francesco La Macchia, 78, Italian sprint canoeist, Olympic silver medalist (1960).
- Roberto Lazzari, 79, Italian Olympic breaststroke swimmer (1960).
- Peter Lewington, 67, English cricketer (Warwickshire, Berkshire).
- Liu Wen-hsiung, 62, Taiwanese politician, MLY (1999–2008), complications from a heart attack.
- Chuck Loeb, 61, American jazz guitarist (Fourplay), cancer.
- Tom Misson, 87, British Olympic racewalker (1960).
- Jeanne Moreau, 89, French actress (Elevator to the Gallows, The Lovers, Jules and Jim).
- Les Murray, 71, Hungarian-born Australian sports broadcaster (The World Game).
- Michael O'Nan, 73, American mathematician.
- Nancy Valentine, 89, American actress (The Black Castle).
