= Heberto =

Heberto is a given name. Notable people with the name include:

- Heberto Blanco (1920–2011), Cuban professional baseball second baseman and shortstop
- Heberto Castillo (1928–1997), Mexican civil engineer, political activist, inventor of the tridilosa
- Heberto Castillo Jr. (born 1969), retired jockey in American Thoroughbred horse racing
- Heberto Neblina (born 1969), Mexican politician affiliated with the PAN
- Heberto Padilla (1932–2000), Cuban poet imprisoned in the so-called Padilla affair
- Heberto Sein (1898–1977), Mexican Quaker leader, peace activist, language interpreter and diplomat
