= Amuchástegui =

Surname list

Amuchástegui is a surname. Notable people with the surname include:

- Luis Amuchástegui (born 1960), Argentine footballer
- María Amuchástegui (1953–2017), Argentine television fitness instructor, ballerina, and singer
