= Cyril Daly =

Irish general medical practitioner

- Born: 1933
- Died: August 12, 2015 (aged 81–82)
- Resting place: St. Fintan's Cemetery, Sutton, Ireland
- Occupations: General medical practitioner, campaigner
- Known for: Campaign against physical punishment in Irish schools
- Notable work: A Matter of Practice
- Spouse: Aileen Daly
- Children: 6

Cyril Daly (1933 – 12 August 2015) was an Irish general medical practitioner (GP) and campaigner against physical punishment in Irish schools. He targeted leading representatives of the Roman Catholic Church and Irish Government in a letter campaign which ultimately led to a ban on physical punishment.

== Biography ==
He was a GP in Killester, north Dublin. His campaign began in 1967, when his 8-year-old son told him that another boy had been beaten with a leather strap by a teacher at school. Daly told the principal of the Catholic primary school that he didn't want his children attending a school where such punishment was permitted; he was asked to remove his children. After a time of homeschooling, his children were later taught at a non-denominational school, Sandford Park in Dublin. Daly – a devout Catholic – wrote to John Charles McQuaid, Archbishop of Dublin, describing Catholic education in Ireland as corrupt and offensive to Christ's teachings because it allowed violence in schools; the letter was co-signed by three other doctors, P.D. McCarthy, Dermot Walsh and N.P. Walsh. The same year, a partly deaf-blind 9-year-old boy was awarded just a shilling in damages by an Irish court after a teacher was sued for beating him – this case led to the founding of the Reform movement to abolish corporal punishment. In 1969, Daly sent a letter with 8000 signatures to Brian Lenihan, the Minister for Education, stating that children had human rights as well as adults. The papal nuncio was sent a letter with reference to "psycho-sexual deviation", using the example that in everyday society only teachers and prostitutes regularly beat people, adding that the most needy pupils were the ones most likely to be beaten.

He sought American influence with his campaign. The US broadcaster NBC visited Ireland to make a documentary about punishment in Irish schools which was also broadcast on the Irish channel, RTÉ. This followed an exposé by the British newspaper, the News of the World after it was contacted in a parallel campaign by another GP, Paddy Randles in Navan. Daly sent letters to American newspapers highlighting the issue. NBC's documentary was widely condemned by commentators in the Irish press and ministers in the Dáil Éireann. Many critics were openly concerned with the effect on the image of Ireland abroad due to these stories. In the Seanad Éireann, Seán Brosnahan, former general secretary of the Irish National Teachers' Organisation, described the doctors as unrepresentative and the campaign as "vicious" adding that it was "very embarrassing for anybody to have to stand here before intelligent people to take a stand against this campaign" and that the TV documentary portrayed "the Irish people as a nation of savages."

In addition to his continued medical practice, Daly was a vocal campaigner against abortion and divorce, in line with his religious beliefs. He was a successful orator and writer, contributing frequently to Irish Medical Times in addition to newspaper articles. He wrote short stories and plays: his work, A Matter of Practice, was performed at the Abbey Theatre, Dublin, in 1967.

== Legacy ==
Physical punishment was banned in Irish schools by the Minister for Education, John Boland, on 1 February 1982. Daly later reprised his campaign's success in a further article in 2009. He retired in April 2015 and died in August that year, aged 82, survived by his wife, Aileen, and six children. He is buried in St. Fintan's Cemetery, Sutton.
