= John Haddox =

American philosopher

John Herbert Haddox (August 9, 1929 – July 15, 2017) was an American philosopher known for his thought in the area of ethics and social philosophy, and for his groundbreaking work of introducing Mexican philosophers to the English-speaking world. He taught over 56 years at the University of Texas at El Paso before becoming professor emeritus in philosophy upon his retirement in 2013. His best known books were Vasconcelos of Mexico: Philosopher and Prophet, and Antonio Caso: Philosopher of Mexico, both of which were published by the University of Texas Press. He also wrote extensively on Chicano and Native American thought.

== Biography ==
Known internationally for his efforts to promote peace and human rights, Haddox worked with many organizations over the years, including the American Friends Service Committee and the student organization MEChA. He lectured in Brasília, Brazil, at the National University of Mexico, at Oxford and Cambridge Universities in the UK, at Charles University in Prague, Czech Republic, and at universities and academic meetings throughout the United States. He was appointed by Pope Paul VI Knight of the Order of St Gregory the Great. Haddox was a close friend and collaborator with Mexican pacifist and diplomat Heberto Sein during his later years.

John Haddox was born in Pawnee, Oklahoma. He served in the U.S. military during the Korean War, and met his wife, Carmen (Mendoza) Haddox, while stationed at William Beaumont Army Medical Center. They raised eleven children.

== Main ideas ==
Haddox received his doctorate from the University of Notre Dame, where he came under the influence of Jacques Maritain and the "new scholasticism." With a strong background in science (he had originally intended to study medicine), and influenced by Alexander Ivanovich Oparin and his ideas concerning abiogenesis as well as scholastic ideas of universal order, he championed teleology in biology. When he began teaching in a bicultural environment, his focus changed from the philosophy of science to ethics and social philosophy. John Haddox has been called a "religious existentialist" and a "personalist." He argued for the need to include Latin American philosophers, and especially Mexican philosophers, into the philosophical canon. He made the case that worldviews emerging from the "territorial minorities" in the United States, Chicanos and Native Americans, constitute unique and fully developed philosophical positions as well. Out of his interest in Latin American philosophers such as Bartolomé de las Casas, José Enrique Rodó, Domingo Faustino Sarmiento, Leopoldo Zea, José Vasconcelos and Antonio Caso, who were fully involved in the social, political and educational movements of their time, Haddox developed a philosophy of activism. The duty of the philosopher is to be engaged in society, from an ethical perspective, and to form through education conscientious citizens. The teaching of social ethics awakens the human conscience, replacing the instinctive with altruism. These ideas are embodied in his famous paraphrase of Caso: "The properly and distinctively human feature of man is his ability to say to others ‘take,’ ‘take of my time,’ ‘take of my concern,’ ‘take of my interest,’ 'take of my possessions,' even, ‘take of me.'"
