= Wanda Lesisz =

Polish resistance fighter (1926–2017)

Wanda Lesisz, also Wanda Gutowska-Lesisz (15 July 1926 – 16 July 2017) was a Polish resistance fighter during World War II. She was honoured Righteous Among the Nations for hiding Jews from the Nazis.

== Biography ==
She married Tadeusz Lesisz, who was a Polish naval officer. Her father served in the Polish Army before the war, and was murdered by the Soviets in the Katyn massacre. She and her sisters attended a military school taught by a minister until the age of 15, after she began attending a school run by the wife of the same minister.

While German forces invaded Poland in 1939, Wanda and her family had to evacuate. Her new home had no windows, no glass, and cracked radiators. She got a job as a newspaper distributor. However, this quickly changed when she was asked to join the underground, which her mother and sisters were also a part of. Wanda's main job was distributing messages, however she also distributed weapons to other members of the resistance. In addition to this, she assisted an English Beach Jumper who lived with them for a short amount of time, but later was apprehended and killed.

Together with her family (her mother, Leonia Gutowska, and sister, Janina Różecka-Gutowska), she aided several Jews, for which she and her family would be recognized as Righteous Among the Nations after the war.

Wanda Lesisz
