= Egbert de Graeff =

Dutch field hockey player

Personal information
- Nationality: Dutch
- Born: 11 December 1936 Amsterdam, Netherlands
- Died: 7 July 2017 (aged 80)

Sport
- Sport: Field hockey

Egbert Cornelis Christiaan de Graeff (11 December 1936 – 7 July 2017) was Jonkheer and a Dutch field hockey player.

== Biography ==
Egbert de Graeff was a member of the De Graeff family. His father was Herman Jacob de Graeff (1907-1978), and his grandfather Dirk Georg de Graeff. He played for many years for the field hockey club TOGO from The Hague.

De Graeff appeared in the national hockey team several times and was active at the men's tournament during the 1960 Summer Olympics in Rome, where he took 9th place with the Netherlands.
