= Cheri Maples =

American lawyer

Cheryll Ann Maples (November 1, 1952 – July 27, 2017) was an American police officer, peace activist and dharma instructor, ordained by Thích Nhất Hạnh in January 2008. Maples died on July 27, 2017, aged 64, from complications of injuries sustained in a bicycle crash in September 2016.

== Early life ==
Maples was born in Fort Sill, Oklahoma and grew up in Oak Creek, Wisconsin. She received an undergraduate degree in social welfare and economics from University of Wisconsin–Milwaukee, a master's degree in social work from University of Wisconsin–Madison, and a J.D. from University of Wisconsin Law School.

== Career ==
For 25 years, Maples worked in the criminal justice system, as an assistant attorney general in the Wisconsin Department of Justice, as the head of Probation & Parole for the Wisconsin Department of Corrections, and as a police officer with the City of Madison Police Department, earning the rank of Captain of Personnel and Training.

Before becoming a police officer in 1984, she worked as a community organizer, working in neighborhood centers, deferred prosecution programs, and domestic violence programs, and was the first employee and head of the Wisconsin Coalition against Domestic Violence. Her efforts were on teaching mindfulness and meditation-including to prisoners. She spoke from personal experience about topics such as the effects of secondary trauma on those working in helping professions. She was a member of SnowFlower Sangha in Madison, Wisconsin, where she resided.

Maples had been a lay member of Hanh's Order of Interbeing since 2002. She co-founded the Center for Mindfulness & Justice, a keynote speaker, and an organizational consultant and trainer. Cheri was known for combining the mindfulness tradition of Thích Nhất Hạnh with vipassana practice in her teaching and taught nationally, including with Sharon Salzberg and at Tara Brach's Insight Meditation Community of Washington.

A police officer for 20 years with the Madison Police Department, Maples organized a non-denominational retreat in 2003 with Thích Nhất Hạnh and criminal justice professionals, which received considerable national attention.

An outgrowth of the retreat was a book by Hanh entitled Keeping the Peace: Mindfulness and Public Service, with the foreword by Maples.
