= Mauno Hartman =

Finnish sculptor (1930–2017)

Mauno Runar Hartman (5 July 1930 – 18 July 2017) was a Finnish sculptor. He is best known for his large works made of logs. The largest of them is 18.5-metre (61 ft) high Stockhimmel.

Hartman studied in Academy of Fine Arts in Helsinki from 1950 to 1954. After that he traveled abroad for three years and searched for his own expression. In 1960 he saw a house being dismantled, and the abstract shape gave him a vision of what he wanted to do. After that he used old logs as material for his sculptures.

One of the highlights of Hartman's career was the use of his work as the stage set of the opera Viimeiset kiusaukset by Joonas Kokkonen. The opera is about Paavo Ruotsalainen.

Hartman donated a collection of his works to the city of Lahti in 1993. He had offered the collection to the city of Turku, but Turku could not commit to exhibit the large works in public.
