= Walter Orion Sheppard =

American politician

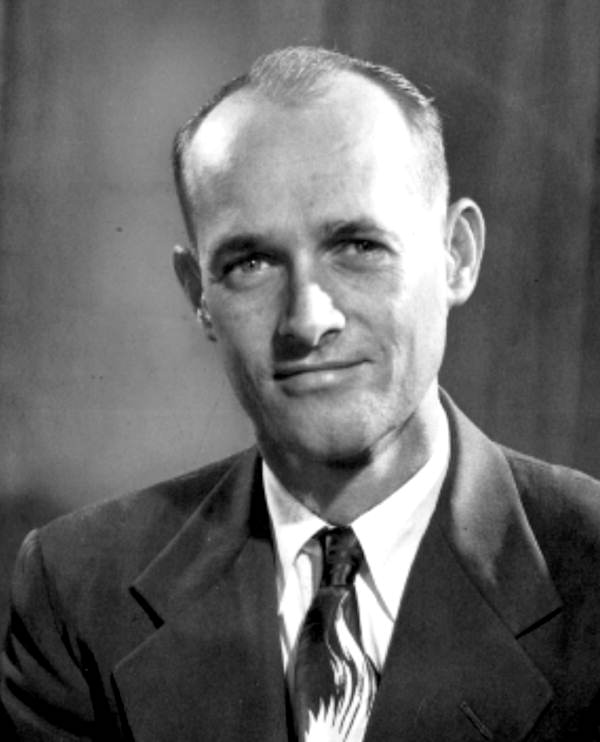
- Sheppard in 1953

Member of the Florida House of Representatives from Lee County
- In office 1953–1959

Personal details
- Born: June 20, 1920 Fort Myers, Florida, U.S.
- Died: July 10, 2017 (aged 97)
- Party: Democratic
- Education: Stetson University; University of Florida

Walter Orion Sheppard (June 20, 1920 – July 10, 2017) was an American politician. He served as a Democratic member of the Florida House of Representatives.

== Life and career ==
Sheppard was born in Fort Myers, Florida. He attended Stetson University and the University of Florida.

Sheppard served in the Florida House of Representatives from 1953 to 1959.

Sheppard died in July 2017, at the age of 97.
