= Chen Xuejun =

Chinese physicist

- 陈学俊
- Born: March 5, 1919; Wuyi Town, Chuzhou, Anhui, China
- Died: July 4, 2017 (aged 98); China
- Education: Yuzhi School; Jinling High School; National Central University; Purdue University
- Awards: Second Prize of the National Prize for Natural Sciences (2007); Science and Technology Award of the Ho Leung Ho Lee Foundation (1996); Second Prize of the National Prize for Progress in Science and Technology (1992); Third Prize of the National Prize for Natural Sciences (1988); First Prize of the National Prize for Progress in Science and Technology (1988)
- Scientific career
- Fields: Thermal Power Engineering
- Workplaces: Xi'an Jiaotong University

Chen Xuejun (simplified Chinese: 陈学俊; traditional Chinese: 陳學俊; pinyin: Chén Xuéjùn; 5 March 1919 – 4 July 2017) was a Chinese physicist. He was a thermal power engineering scientist, professor and former vice president of Xi'an Jiaotong University. He graduated from National Central University with a bachelor's degree in engineering. He studied in the graduate school of Purdue University in the United States. He was an academician of the Chinese Academy of Sciences and of The World Academy of Sciences.
