= Andrzej Trzebski =

Polish physiologist and neurophysiologist (1928–2017)

Andrzej Trzebski (2 February 1928 – 5 July 2017) was a Polish physiologist and neurophysiologist. Since 1971 professor in Medical University of Warsaw. A member of: Warsaw Scientific Society (since 1981), Polish Academy of Sciences (1983) and Polish Academy of Learning (since 1990). Doctor honoris causa of Jagiellonian University.

He was decorated with a Gold Cross of Merit (1971), a Knight's Cross of Polonia Restituta (1981) and a Commander's Cross of Polonia Restituta (1998).

He died on 5 July 2017 at the age of 89 in Warsaw.
