= Helmut Thieltges =

German chef (1955–2017)

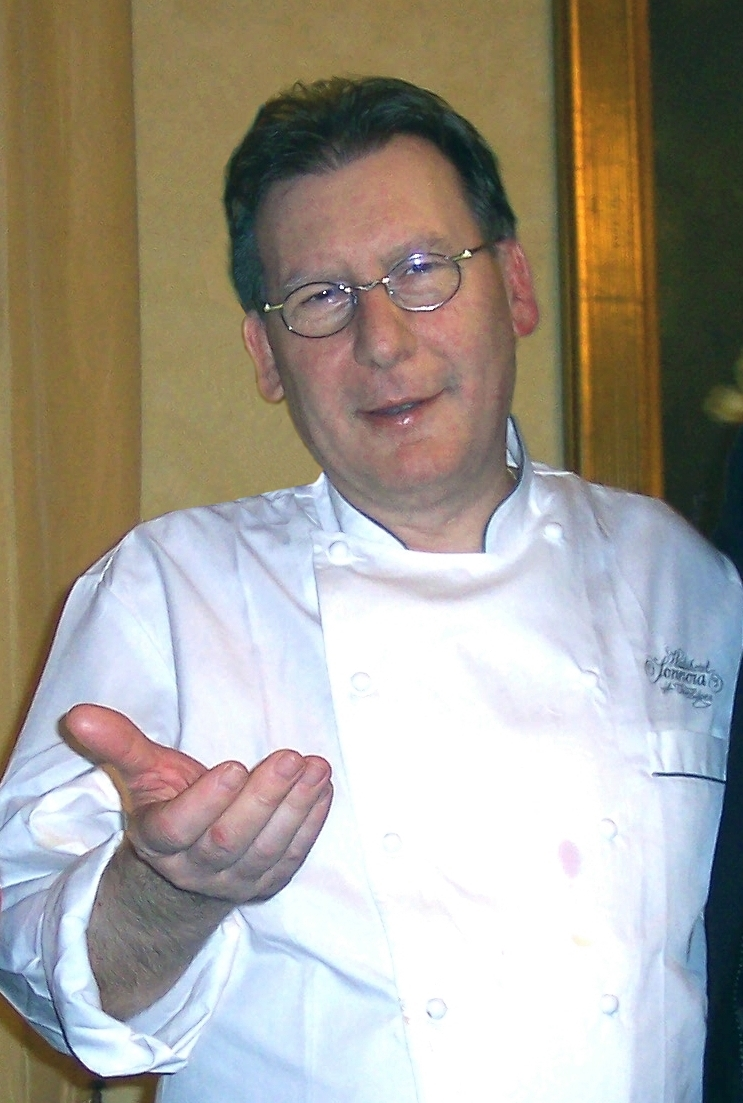
- Thieltges in 2003
- Born: 24 September 1955; Dreis, Germany
- Died: 26 July 2017 (aged 61)
- Culinary career
- Rating
- Michelin stars
- Previous restaurant
- Waldhotel Sonnora

Helmut Thieltges (24 September 1955 – 26 July 2017) was a German chef. Since 1978, he had been chef at the Waldhotel Sonnora, his own family business. Beginning in 1999, his restaurant was awarded three stars by the Michelin Guide for eighteen consecutive years.

== Biography ==
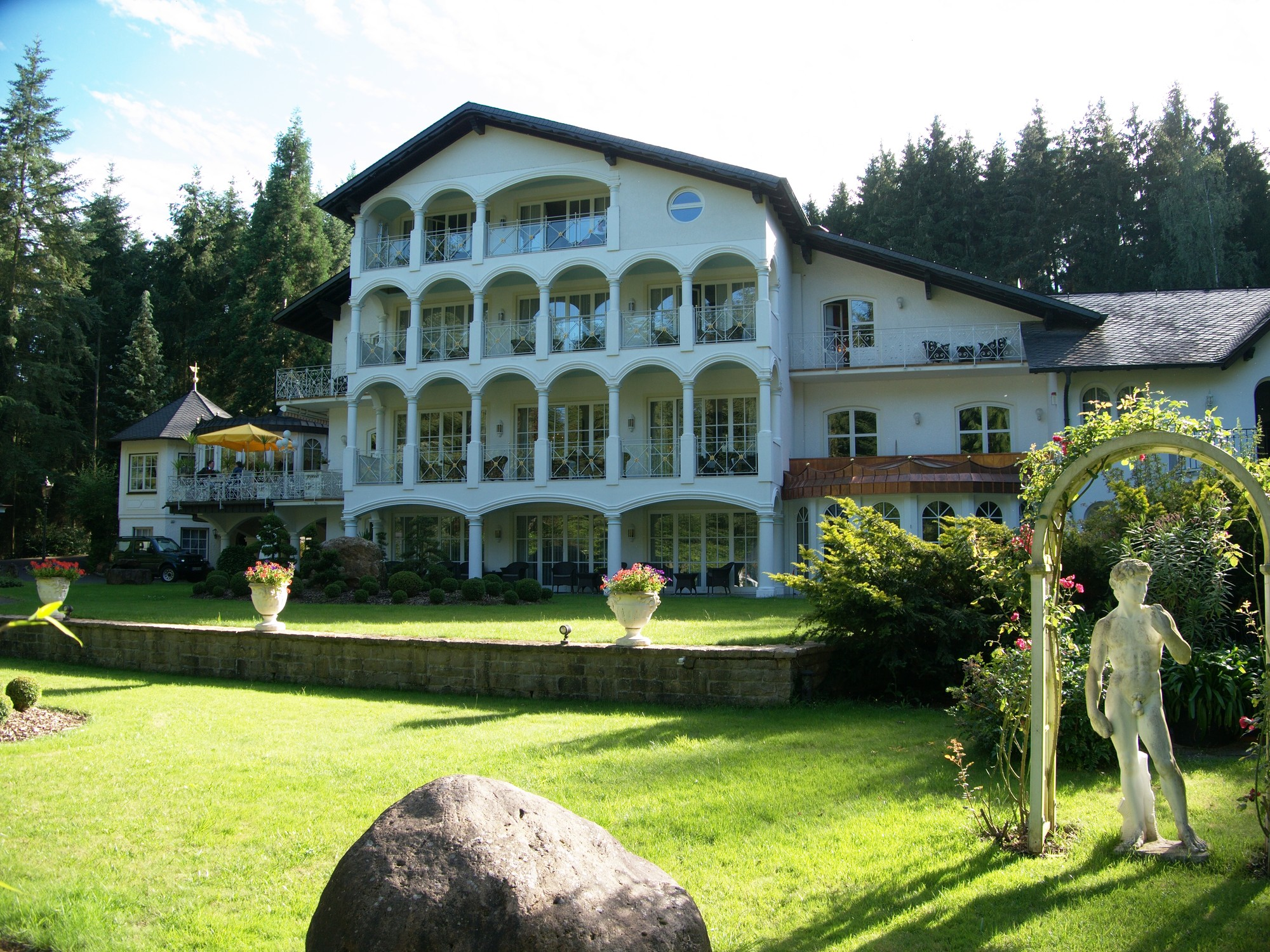
Waldhotel Sonnora garden

Thieltges was the only child of the innkeepers Vinzenz and Maria Thieltges, who led the Pension Elisabeth in Dreis. After his apprenticeship in the Roman Emperor in Trier, he moved to the Schlosshotel Pontresina near St. Moritz in 1973, then to the Breidenbacher Hof in Düsseldorf, and in 1977, to the Bastei restaurant in Cologne. Since 1978, he cooked in the family-owned Waldhotel Sonnora, which is located in a forest on the edge of Dreis.

Thieltges gave few interviews, never published a cookbook, and only wanted to concentrate on his work. At the same time, he was able to delight guests from Belgium, Luxembourg, and France. He started out with the normal program of a dining restaurant; today his cuisine is praised for the "standards of precision".

Of his cooking he once said, "Classical is the true art. That is the basis of everything. Modern can call anyone who wants to do something else with violence."

Thieltges died after a brief illness, at the age of 61.

== Awards ==
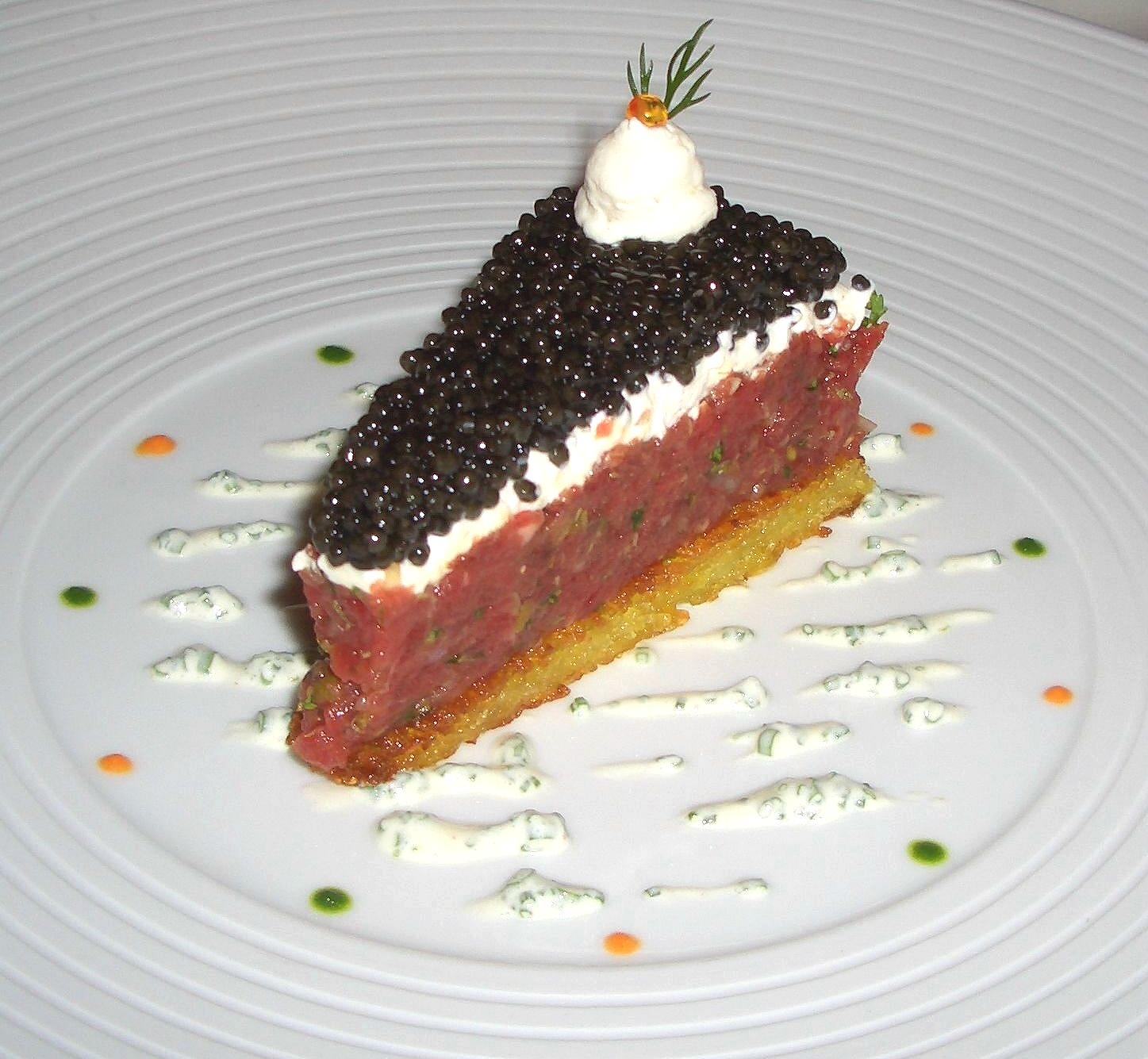
The classic of Thieltges: Kleine Torte vom Rinderfilet Tatar or Tartlet with layers of beef fillet tartare and Imperial caviar over rösti

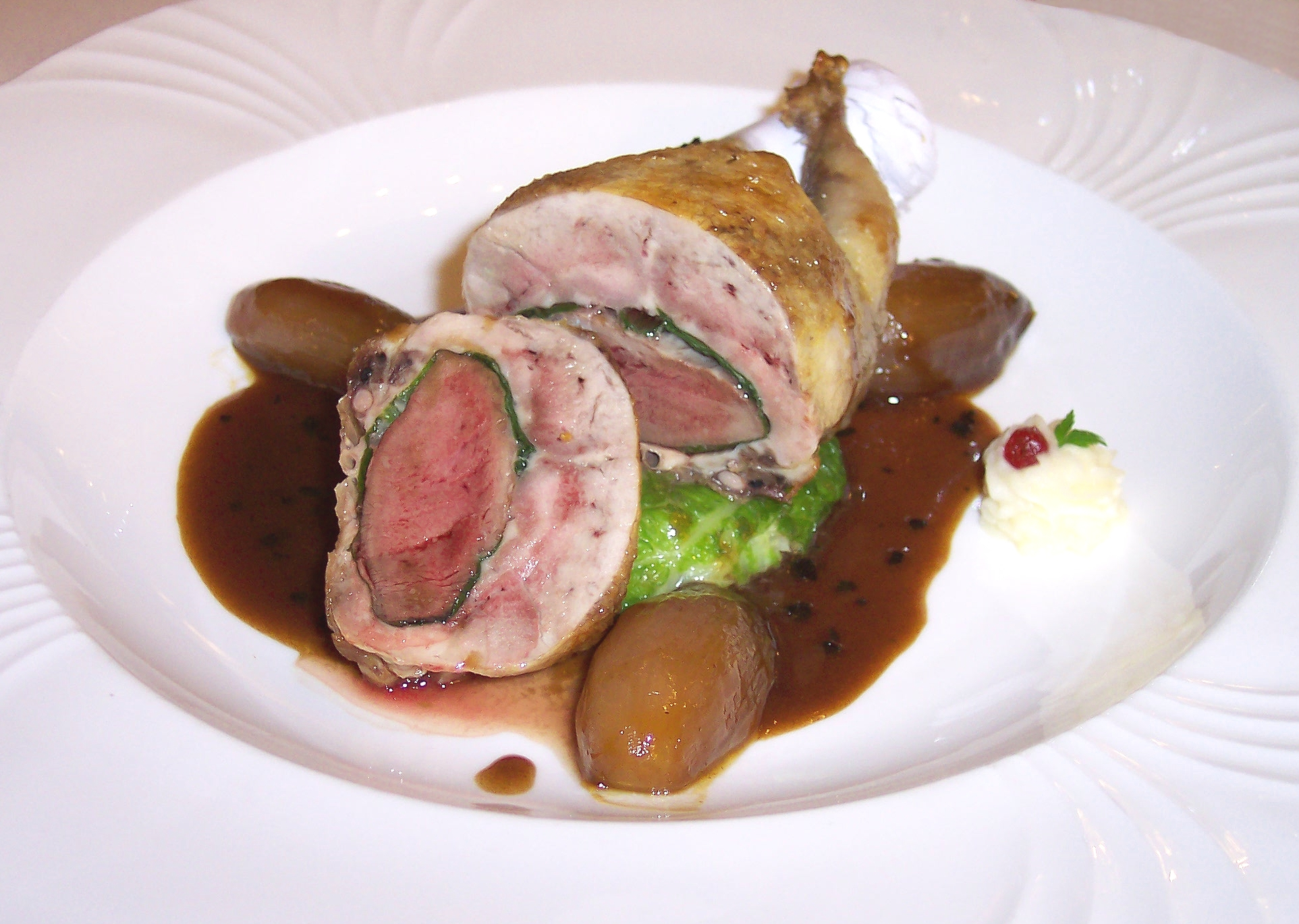
Galantine of quail stuffed with pigeon breast

- 3 Stars in Michelin Guide (Guide Rouge)
- 19.5/20 points in Gault Millau (2015)
- 5 points in Der Feinschmecker
- 5 spoons in ARAL SchlemmerAtlas
- 1998 "Chef of the Year", Gault Millau
