= James E. Gonzales =

American politician

Member of the South Carolina House of Representatives from the 118th district
- In office 1981–1982
- Preceded by: William R. Kinard
- Succeeded by: Drawdy N. Holt Jr.

Personal details
- Born: James Elliott Gonzales; August 28, 1933 Laurel, Mississippi, U.S.
- Died: July 13, 2017 (aged 83) North Charleston, South Carolina, U.S.
- Party: Republican
- Education: College of Charleston; University of South Carolina

James Elliott Gonzales (August 28, 1933 – July 13, 2017) was an American politician. A member of the Republican Party, he served in the South Carolina House of Representatives from 1981 to 1982.

== Life and career ==
Gonzales was born in Laurel, Mississippi, the son of Joseph Palmer Gonzales and Cora Ella Hickman. He attended and graduated from Chicora High School. After graduating, he attended the College of Charleston, earning his BS degree in 1956. He also attended the University of South Carolina, earning his LLB degree in 1963, which after earning his degrees, he worked as a city attorney in North Charleston, South Carolina.

Gonzales served in the South Carolina House of Representatives from 1981 to 1982.

== Death ==
Gonzales died on July 13, 2017, in North Charleston, South Carolina, at the age of 83.
