= George Levinger =

American psychologist (1927–2017)

George Levinger (1927–2017) was Professor of Psychology at the University of Massachusetts in Amherst. Born in Berlin, Germany, he fled the Nazi regime with his Jewish family in 1935, first moving to Switzerland and then to London, before emigrating to the United States in 1941. He received his B.A. from Columbia University in 1946. After his army service in Tokyo and time in the import-export business, he received a 1951 M.A. in clinical psychology from the University of California, Berkeley and a 1955 Ph.D. in social psychology from the University of Michigan. He later taught at Bryn Mawr College (1957–60), Western Reserve University (1960–65), and the University of Massachusetts (1965–92).

== Professional work ==
Levinger's principal scientific work concerns close interpersonal relationships. After publishing on marital relationships, he sought to link his work to previous social psychological findings about short-term superficial relationships in the laboratory. In 1972 he authored the widely cited paper, "Attraction in relationship: A new look at interpersonal attraction," which distinguished explicitly between surface contact and a deepening mutuality. As two partners become increasingly interdependent and concerned with each other, their mutual involvement is pictured by a growing intersection between two circles or mutual "life spaces." This image applied to any sort of close relationship—whether a courtship, a friendship, or a business partnership. The framework helped to spawn a research literature and debate on the multifaceted nature and measurement of mutuality (aka closeness) and the factors that promote its development, on the one hand, and undermine it, on the other. In 1974, he organized an interdisciplinary conference on close relationships at the University of Massachusetts, resulting in the book Close Relationships.

Two other papers on pair "cohesiveness" proposed a model for explaining why some couples stay together even though partners find themselves in an "empty-shell" relationship. Two years later, he edited a book on breakups: Divorce and Separation: Context, Causes, and Consequences.

In contributing to the subsequent multi-authored theoretical book Close Relationships, Levinger's chapter on "Development and change" focused on the longitudinal sequence from Acquaintance to Build-up to Continuation to possible Deterioration and Ending, and the transitions between those phases. This "A-B-C-D-E" model and analysis among its transitions is a tool for viewing changes in couple relationships in general.

In 1990, the International Society for the Study of Personal Relationships gave Levinger its first Distinguished Career Contribution Award.

== Bibliography ==
=== Books ===
- Levinger, George Klaus; Moles, Oliver Clinton (1979). Divorce and separation: context, causes, and consequences. Basic Books.
- Levinger, George Klaus; Raush, Harold L. (1977). Close Relationships: Perspectives on the Meaning of Intimacy. Univ of Massachusetts Press. ISBN 087023238X.
- Levinger, George Klaus; Snoek, J. Diedrick (1972). Attraction in Relationship: A New Look at Interpersonal Attraction. General Learning Press.

=== Journal articles ===
- Levinger, G. (1963). Supplementary methods in family research. Family Process, 2, 357-366.
- Levinger, G. (1964). Task and social behavior in marriage. Sociometry, 27, 433-448.
- Levinger, G. (1964). Note on need complementarity in marriage. Psychological Bulletin, 61, 153-157.
- Levinger, G. (1965). Marital cohesiveness and dissolution: An integrative review. Journal of Marriage and the Family, 27, 19-28.
- Levinger, G. (1965). Altruism in marriage. Journal of Marriage and the Family, 27, 32-33.
- Levinger, G., & Sonnheim, M. (1965). Complementarity in marital adjustment: Reconsidering Toman's family constellation hypothesis. (1965). Journal of Individual Psychology, 21, 147-145.
- Levinger, G., & Breedlove, J. (1966). Interpersonal attraction and agreement. Journal of Personality and Social Psychology, 1966, 3, 367-372.
- Levinger, G. (1966). Systematic distortion in spouses' reports of preferred and actual sexual behavior. Sociometry, 29, 291-299.
- Levinger, G. (1966). Sources of marital dissatisfaction among applicants for divorce. American Journal of Orthopsychiatry, 36, 803-807.
- Levinger, G., & Senn, D. J. (1967). Disclosure of feelings in marriage. Merrill-Palmer Quarterly, 13, 237-249.
- Levinger, G., Senn, D. J., & Jorgensen, B. W. Progress toward permanence in courtship: A test of the Kerckhoff-Davis hypotheses. Sociometry, 1970, 33, 427-443.
- Levinger, G., & Snoek, J. D. Attraction in relationship: A new look at interpersonal attraction. Morristown, N. J.: General Learning Press, 1972.
- Levinger, G. A three-level approach to attraction: Toward an understanding of pair relatedness. In T. L. Huston (Ed.), Foundations of interpersonal attraction . New York: Academic Press, 1974.
- Levinger, G. A social psychological perspective on marital dissolution. Journal of Social Issues, 1976, 32 (1), 21-47.
- Levinger, G., & Raush, H. L. (Eds.), Close relationships: Perspectives on the meaning of intimacy. Amherst, MA: University of Massachusetts Press, 1977.
- Levinger, G. Toward the analysis of close relationships. Journal of Experimental Social Psychology, 1980, 16, 510-544.
- Rands, M., Levinger, G., & Mellinger, G. D. Patterns of conflict resolution and marital satisfaction. Journal of Family Issues, 1981, 2, 297-321.
