= Stephen T. Worland =

American economist (1923–2017)

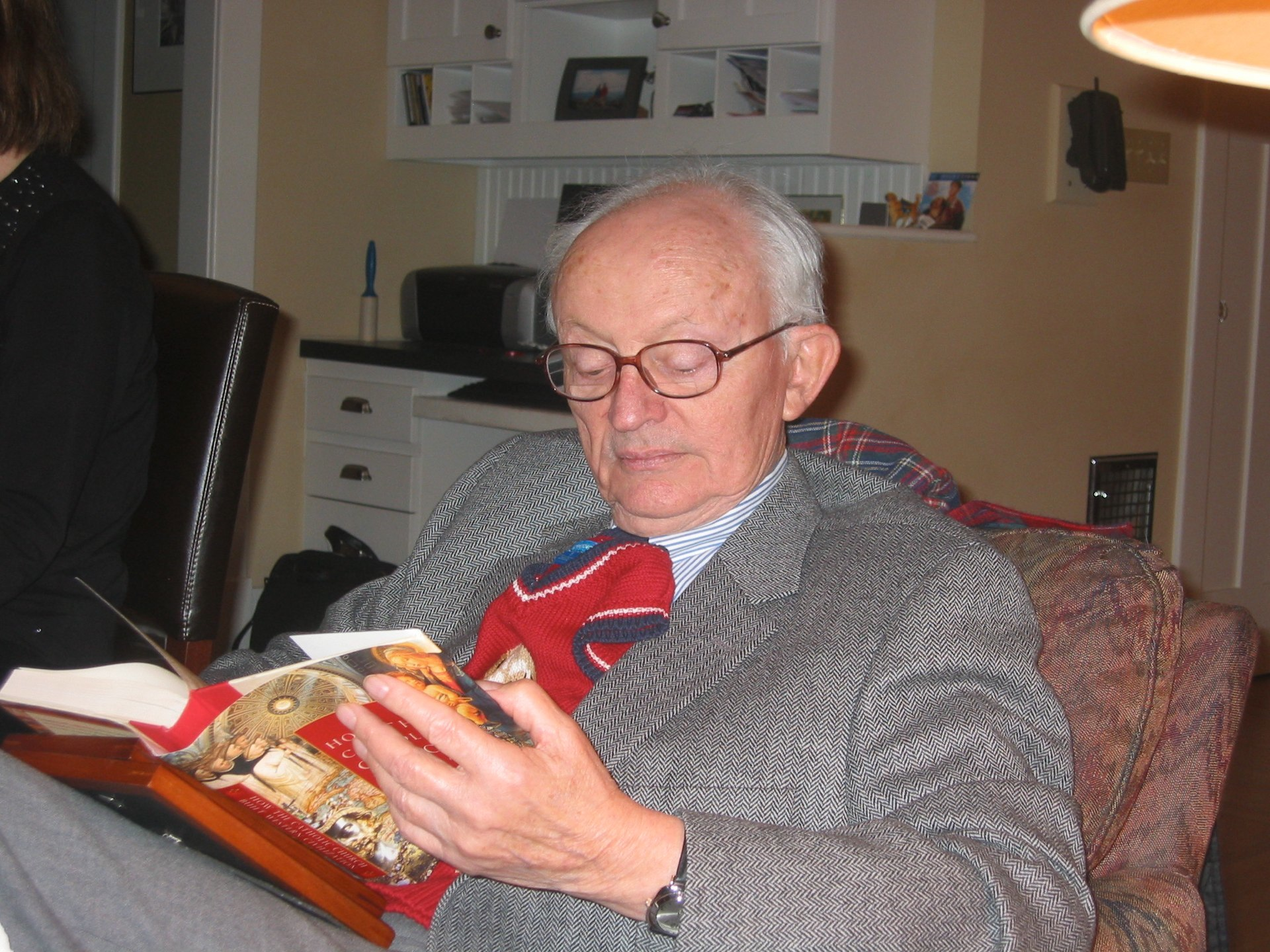
- Stephen T. Worland in 2006
- Born: February 19, 1923; Neoga, Illinois, U.S.
- Died: July 29, 2017 (aged 94); Columbus, Indiana, U.S.
- Education: University of Illinois, B.A., Ph.D.
- Occupations: Economist; Professor, University of Notre Dame
- Spouse: Roberta McCarthy Worland
- Children: 8

Stephen T. Worland (February 19, 1923 – July 29, 2017) was an American economist and professor at the University of Notre Dame. Worland's specialties included the history of economic thought, social economics, and welfare economics. Worland is the author of the book Scholasticism and Welfare Economics, published by the University of Notre Dame Press in 1967. He also authored the Economics and Justice chapter in the book Justice: Views from the Social Sciences, edited by Ronald L. Cohen and published by Springer in 1986.

== Biography ==
Worland was born in Neoga, Illinois and began his education in the Neoga public schools. During World War II, he served in the United States Navy on the USS Idaho (BB-42) battleship. He held a B.A. and a Ph.D. in Economics from the University of Illinois. His dissertation, completed in 1956, was on the economic thought of St. Thomas Aquinas. Worland held faculty appointments at Michigan State University and the University of Dayton before he joined the University of Notre Dame in 1957. He taught at Notre Dame for 30 years. In 1987, he joined the College of Saint Benedict and Saint John's University faculty for two years as the first occupant of the Clemens Chair in Economics and the Liberal Arts. He died in Columbus, Indiana in 2017.

== Research ==
Worland's research and writing focus on defining and clarifying economic justice as a social and moral concept. Worland was an adherent to neoclassical welfare economics and analyzed the writing of Aristotle through the eyes of modern economics.

In his Scholasticism and Welfare Economics book, Worland demonstrated that welfare economics shares the philosophical premises of scholastic economic reasoning and helps clarify the significance of economic efficiency in the scholastic doctrine of the just price. In the Justice: Views from the Social Sciences book, to which he contributed the Economics and Justice chapter, Worland examined classical economics, Marxism, and neoclassical economics, and concluded that distributive justice cannot be achieved in a market society without considering more than simply contributions to production.

Worland's research often focused on Catholic social teaching. For example, his 2001 Just Wages article in the journal First Things explains the teaching of the Catholic Church regarding a living wage for workers. In his 1994 presentation to The Association for Christian Economics, Worland wrote that although there should be no such thing as "Christian Economics" or "Catholic Economics," as "Christian faith will not produce a body of economic knowledge different from that to be discovered by honest, secular scientific effort,” the Judeo-Christian message makes an important and unique contribution to an understanding of a modern market society.

== Teaching philosophy ==
Worland wrote that economics should be taught in such a way that students learn about the real-world problems of injustice and human development, and not just the theory and mathematical underpinnings of economics. In 1975, in Forum for Social Economics, he wrote that at Notre Dame, where he taught, a decision was made to restructure the Ph.D. program to focus on socioeconomic issues and social justice, and to teach and research the fundamental problems of social economy that "should be a major concern for every economist with a truly humane interest in his profession."

== Honors ==
In 1987, Worland was awarded the Reinhold Niebuhr Award, an annual award that honors a faculty member or college administrator whose work and life promote or exemplify social justice.

In 1993, Worland was awarded the Thomas F. Divine award. Named for one of the founding fathers of the Association for Social Economics, the Thomas F. Divine Award is presented annually to an Association member who over a lifetime has made important contributions to social economics and the social economy.

== Selected publications ==
=== Books ===
- Scholasticism and Welfare Economics. Notre Dame, IN: University of Notre Dame Press, 1967.

=== Articles and presentations ===
- Worland, Stephen T. (September 1975). "Doctoral programs in social economics and political economy — a note". Forum for Social Economics. 5 (3): 35–36. doi:10.1007/BF02816081 (inactive 15 November 2026). S2CID 154957019.
- Worland, Stephen (1989). "Etzioni's "deontological paradigm": A new direction for social economics?". Forum for Social Economics. 19 (1): 7–19. doi:10.1007/BF02827048. S2CID 143706091.
- Worland, Stephen (September 1988). "The preferential option for the poor and the Marxian-Christian perspective on distributive justice". Forum for Social Economics. 18 (1): 1–25. doi:10.1007/BF02745639. S2CID 153382455.
- Worland, Stephen (June 1983). "Industrial policy and 'participation': The perspective of the bishops' pastoral letter". Forum for Social Economics. 12 (2): 1–19. doi:10.1007/BF02958643. S2CID 154807750.
- Worland, Stephen T. (1972). "Radical Political Economy as a 'Scientific Revolution'". Southern Economic Journal. 39 (2): 274–284. doi:10.2307/1056598. JSTOR 1056598.
- "The Economic Significance of John Rawls' "A Theory of Justice"". Nebraska Journal of Economics and Business. 12 (4): 119–126. 1973.
- Worland, Stephen T. (1976). "The Economic Social Contract". The Review of Politics. 38 (3): 466–470. doi:10.1017/s0034670500014595.
- Worland, S. T. (1977). "Justum Pretium: One More Round in an "Endless Series"". History of Political Economy. 9 (4): 504–521. doi:10.1215/00182702-9-4-504.
- "Exploitative Capitalism: The Natural-Law Perspective". Social Research. 48 (2): 277–305. 1981.
- Worland, S. T. (1984). "Aristotle and the Neoclassical Tradition: The Shifting Ground of Complementarity". History of Political Economy. 16 (1): 107–134. doi:10.1215/00182702-16-1-107.
- "Response," in Temple-Smith, R. (1986). "Aristotle as a Welfare Economist: A Comment, with a Reply by Stephen T. Worland". History of Political Economy. 18 (3): 523–529. doi:10.1215/00182702-18-3-523.
- Worland, Stephen T. (1991). "The Preferential Option, Pope Pius XI, and the Foundations of Social Economics". Review of Social Economy. 49 (4): 611–627. doi:10.1080/00346769100000051.
- The Right and the Good: And the Retrieval of Welfare Economics. Presented for The Association for Christian Economics. 1994.
- "Just Wages". First Things: A Monthly Journal of Religion and Public Life. 110: 14–17. 2001.
- Worland, Stephen (2005). "Justice and Welfare Economics". Review of Social Economy. 63 (3): 369–382. doi:10.1080/00346760500255288. S2CID 146400398.

=== Book chapters ===
- Adam Smith: Economic Justice and the Founding Father. In Skurski, Roger (Ed.). New Directions in Economic Justice. Notre Dame, IN: University of Notre Dame Press, 1983.
- Economics and Justice. In Ronald L. Cohen (Ed.), Justice: Views from the Social Sciences. New York: Springer, 1986.
- The Investment Decision as Moral Choice: The Perspective of Centesimus Annus. In Edward O'Boyle (Ed.), Social Economics: Premises, Findings, and Policies. London: Routledge, 1996.

=== Book reviews ===
- Book Review: Religion and Economic Justice edited by Michael Zweig. Review of Radical Political Economics 26.2 (1994): 131–134.
- Book Review: The Ethical Foundations of Economics by John J. Piderit. Journal of Economic Literature 33.1. (1995): 193–195.
- Book Review: Economics as a Moral Science: The Political Economy of Adam Smith by Jeffrey T. Young. Journal of the History of Economic Thought 21:01. (1999): 101–103.
- Book Review: The Legacy of Scholasticism in Economic Thought: Antecedents of Choice and Power by Odd Langholm. Journal of the History of Economic Thought 21:03. (1999): 325–327.
