= S. Nainar Kulasekaran =

- Born: 1924; Nattathi, Tuticorin, India
- Died: 30 July 2017 (aged 92–93)
- Other name: Thamirabarani thaatha
- Occupation: Journalist
- Known for: Thamirabarani protest
- Notable work: Tamirabarani Nadhiyum, Vivasaayigalin Urimaiyum (The Thamirabarani River and the Rights of the Farmer)
- Spouse: Vellaiyammal
- Children: Rajkumar (one son), Chellakani, Selvakumari (two daughters)

S. Nainar Kulasekaran (Tamil: சி. நயினார் குலசேகரன்) (1924 – 30 July 2017) was a social activist from Tuticorin, Tamilnadu. He was known for his activities to protect the Thamirabarani River.

== Early life ==
He was born in 1924 in Nattathi village, Tuticorin district and started his career as an administrative staff-cum-correspondent in a vernacular daily. He was involved in the Bhoodan movement launched by Vinoba Bhave. He served as District Secretary of Indira Congress in the 1970s.

== Social activity ==
He founded Thamirabarani Pathugappu Peravai (Thamirabarani Protection Federation). In 2005, he led the farmers' protest when the Coca-Cola plant was set up inside the SIPCOT Industrial Complex. He played a vital role in protesting against illegal sand quarrying, de-siltation in the Srivaikundam dam and industrial pollution on the Thamirabarani.

In 2010, he released Tamirabarani Nadhiyum, Vivasaayigalin Urimaiyum, a book about the Thamirabarani river and the rights of the farmer with detailed work of Thamirabarani flow and irrigation.
