= Paddy Randles =

Irish general practitioner & campaigner against corporal punishment (1924-2017)

Patrick A. Randles (1924 – 12 July 2017) was an Irish general practitioner and campaigner against corporal punishment. In 1969, he brought international attention to physical punishment in Irish schools after finding a 9-year-old patient with an injured arm had been beaten by his teacher on the arm for the resulting poor handwriting.

== Biography ==
In his youth, Randles experienced psychological abuse at a school run by the Christian Brothers in Dublin. After training as a physician, he worked at a practice in England. With an interest in child psychology, what he initially thought was intimidating precociousness in English children he eventually understood as normal confidence, in contrast to the lower self-esteem in children he noticed in his practice in the 1960s at Watergate Street, Navan, County Meath. He was similarly struck by the marked difference in attitude towards children from their parents. Notwithstanding this, several parents spoke about their children being physically punished at De La Salle School in Abbey Road. Norman Murray, a 9-year-old who had injured his right wrist in a fall tried to write with his left and was struck several times by his teacher on the right wrist with a rubber hosepipe as a punishment for messy handwriting. His mother asked Randles for a note to show the Brother, asking for beatings on the left wrist as the right one was painful.

=== Campaign ===
Randles visited the school, complaining to the headteacher, Brother Damien, who showed him the strap he used himself for punishment, which had coins stitched into it; Randles told Damien that he would seek to put an end to it. He collected statements from parents visiting his practice and sent them to Irish newspapers, none of which ran the story, but the British News of the World – a tabloid also sold in Ireland – sent reporters to Navan. On 4 May 1969, it covered the story, titled 'Children Under The Lash', detailing corporal punishment in the UK and Ireland, mentioning pupils refusing to attend De La Salle school, running away from home and staff using straps custom-made locally.

Most people in Navan did not see the story because bundles of newspapers were stolen before newsagents could sell them during the three weeks of coverage. The Meath Chronicle, a week after the News of the World, ran an article with a past-pupils organisation supporting the school, quoting two resolutions: "We fully appreciate the work of the De La Salle Brothers for the past 52 years in Navan," and "we reassure them of our continued loyalty and our confidence in their work for the boys of Navan, both inside and outside the school." Murray's mother was invited to see the local Roman Catholic bishop, John McCormack, who asked her to refrain from discussing the issue further, but she refused. Randles and his wife, Mary Randles, a family-planning expert, received letters warning them to leave town, had their car tyres slashed, bricks thrown through the surgery window and were ostracised by some, with negative comments made during mass and from nuns in schools.

Corporal punishment in Irish schools was discussed in government debates on 23 July and 4 December 1969. In the latter debate was discussed a 1968 case in which a 9-year old partially deaf-blind boy from a Dublin school was severely beaten on the buttocks by a Christian Brother who was sued by the parents: they were awarded one shilling and had to pay costs. The American broadcaster, NBC, followed up on the News of the World story and earlier campaigning against corporal punishment by Cyril Daly, P.D. McCarthy, Dermot Walsh and N.P. Walsh with its report The Land of Saints and Scholars, part of its First Tuesday programme aired in September 1969 about corporal punishment in Irish schools, also aired on the Irish broadcaster RTÉ. The broadcast was called "a vile piece of treachery against the Irish people" by senator Seán Brosnahan – also general secretary of the Irish National Teachers Organisation. In the Seanad, he spoke of "a vicious campaign which has been carried on inside and outside this country against the teaching profession," adding "We are discussing a campaign which tries to pin the charge of brutality on Irish teachers, on Irish schools and on the Irish system." He accused unnamed medical professionals, "a very small group who do not represent at all the magnificent profession of medicine in this country." The Seanad Éireann received thousands of letters about the programme. Public discussions often related to protecting the image of Ireland and supporting the reputation of the Catholic Church. Local Labour Party election material claimed "Beating is a British legacy" and provided contact details for the new REFORM organisation aiming to stop corporal punishment.

== Legacy ==
The De La Salle Brothers left the school in 1976. Randles continued to work in Navan despite what Mary Randles described as the "stain" which affected them occasionally in the decades afterwards. Corporal punishment in Irish schools was abolished in 1982. Randles died in 2017 survived by his wife. A bench with a brass plaque in his honour was unveiled by Councillor Tommy Reilly, Mayor of Navan.
