= Jean-Claude Fignolé =

Haitian author

- Born: May 24, 1941; Jérémie, Haiti
- Died: July 11, 2017; Port-au-Prince, Haiti
- Occupation: Author

Jean-Claude Fignolé (May 24, 1941 – July 11, 2017) was a Haitian author.
