= Artur Almeida =

Brazilian sports journalist (1960–2017)

- Born: May 18, 1960; Belo Horizonte, Minas Gerais, Brazil
- Died: July 24, 2017 (aged 57); Lisbon, Portugal
- Occupation: Journalist
- Children: 3

Artur Nogueira de Almeida Neto, better known as Artur Almeida (May 18, 1960 – July 24, 2017), was a Brazilian journalist.

== Biography ==
Son of the also journalist Guy de Almeida and graduated by the Pontifical Catholic University of Minas Gerais, in 1987, he started for first time on TV Globo Minas, leaving in 1990 and backing only in 1992. His second phase on the TV station lasted 25 years, ending when he died. Almeida occupied the functions of chief editor and presenter for more than 20 years. He was chief editor and presenter of MGTV between 1997 and 2005, and again between 2009 and 2017. Between 2005 and 2009, he exerced the same functions in Bom Dia Minas.

== Death ==
Almeida died on July 24, 2017, victim of a cardiorespiratory arrest while on vacation in Lisbon, Portugal.
