= Shaun Brogan =

Major in the British Special Air Service (1944–2017)

Shaun Brogan

Shaun Michael Brogan (24 May 1944 – 9 July 2017) was a major in the Special Air Service who received the Military Cross for his part in the Dhofar campaign.
