= Okay Gönensin =

Turkish journalist (1950–2017)

- Born: October 14, 1950; Sarıkamış, Kars Province, Turkey
- Died: July 13, 2017 (aged 66); Istanbul, Turkey
- Education: St. Joseph High School Istanbul; Ankara University's Faculty of Political Science
- Occupation: Journalist
- Years active: 1975–2017
- Children: 1

Okay Gönensin (October 14, 1950 – July 13, 2017) was a Turkish journalist.

Okay Gönensin was born in Sarıkamış, Kars Province on October 14, 1950. After finishing the St. Joseph High School in Istanbul in 1967, he studied at Ankara University's Faculty of Political Science and graduated in 1972. He entered his journalism career at the daily Cumhuriyet in 1975. He served as editor in chief, editorial coordinator, executive editor and columnist at the newspapers Cumhuriyet, Sabah, Yeni Yüzyıl, Star and Yeni Binyıl. Lately, he worked with the daily Vatan, he had co-founded.

Gönensin was married to journalist Zeynep Göğüş. The marriage ended with divorce. He died in the early hours of July 13, 2017. He was interred at Nakkaştepe Cemetery following the religious funeral held at Zincirlikuyu Cemetery Mosque. He is survived by a son Can.
