= John Potter (chemist) =

English chemist

- Born: 1927; Camberwell, England
- Died: 17 July 2017 (aged 89–90)
- Occupation: Chemist

John Hubert Potter (1927 – 17 July 2017) was an English chemist who falsely claimed to be a Special Operations Executive agent who worked with the French resistance during World War II.

== Early life and family ==
John Hubert Potter was born in Camberwell, south London, in 1927. He was born with a club foot which was later corrected.

Potter married, first, Olive with whom he had six children, Anne, Roy, Hugh, Neil, Nigel, and Mark. After a divorce, he married Mildred in 1976, a hairdresser he met while travelling in Vienna in 1970.

== Career ==
Potter had a career as a research chemist and salesman. He lived with his second wife Mildred in Belgium and France before retiring to Sussex, England.

== False claims ==
Potter falsely claimed to be a Special Operations Executive agent who worked with the French Resistance during the Second World War under the name Henri Dufour, an 18 year old who he said had been killed in an air raid in northern France while working for the resistance. Potter claimed to have been asked by the SOE to take Dufour's place in 1942 due to his language skills and because he was the right age and both had a club foot. According to Potter, he worked with the resistance throughout the war, was periodically flown back to Britain to brief Winston Churchill, who gave him a glass of brandy, had an affair with a French woman named Yvette, entered Dachau concentration camp with the Americans, and worked as a liaison officer to defend a chemist accused of war crimes at the Nuremberg trials. He also claimed to have an OBE awarded after the war and a first class degree from the University of London. His memoirs were self-published in 2009 as Within the Shadows under the pen-name of Ernest Tarrant.

The claims were only exposed as false after his death when he received an obituary in a local paper The Worthing Herald, as well as in national papers The Express, The Mirror, and The Times, all of which accepted his story. The Times subsequently retracted its obituary in a new article after doubt was thrown on the content in reader feedback. Potter's son Neil, an Anglican priest and vicar of the church in Camborne, Cornwall, was quoted as saying "To the best of my brothers' and my sister's knowledge none of this ever happened ... He was too young to serve in the war. This was a claim he made up to impress his second wife and we cringed when we heard it. It is not the only thing he lied about."

== Death ==
Potter died from the effects of dementia on 17 July 2017 at St. Michael's Nursing Home. The funeral was at Worthing Crematorium followed by a memorial service at St Andrew's Church, West Tarring. Despite evidence that has emerged since his death, Mildred Potter maintains that her husband's story of wartime heroism is completely true, saying "you cannot make up all those details".
