= James Egan (artist) =

Australian artist

James Egan (23 May 1929 - 28 July 2017) was an Australian artist. His work has featured in exhibitions around the world.

== History ==
Egan was born in Melbourne, Australia. From the age of 14 to 19, Egan worked as a boxer and came into a contact with an Englishman on the run from the law. This Englishman, name unknown, taught James how to draw and the arts in general as he himself had previously learnt at the Slade Art School in London. Egan's inspiration has come from places including the Australian outback and bushland to the third world countries of Mexico and Cambodia, as well as some of the poorest areas of Spain, England and the United States. In 1986, the Victorian Government recognized Egan's contribution to the artwork deeming him a Living Treasure in Perpetuity. Egan died on 28 July 2017, age 88.

== Collections ==
His work has been displayed in many notable exhibitions such as:

- The Prince of Wales collection at Buckingham Palace
- San Francisco Airport
- World Trade Center
- Moscow Parliament Collection
