= Martin Esmonde =

Tipperary hurler (1947–2017)

Personal information
- Native name: Máirtín Easmann (Irish)
- Born: 1947 Moyne, County Tipperary, Ireland
- Died: 16 July 2017 (aged 70) Moyne, County Tipperary, Ireland

Sport
- Sport: Hurling
- Position: Right wing-back
Club
- Years: Club
- Moyne–Templetuohy
Club titles
- Tipperary titles: 1
Inter-county
- Years: County
- 1972-1974: Tipperary
Inter-county titles
- Munster titles: 0
- All-Irelands: 0
- NHL: 0
- All Stars: 0

Martin Esmonde (1947 – 16 July 2017) was an Irish hurler. At club level, he played with Moyne–Templetuohy and at inter-county level with the Tipperary senior hurling team.

== Career ==
Esmonde began his club career at juvenile and underage levels with Moyne–Templetuohy. After winning divisional titles in the minor and underage grades, he progressed to adult level. Esmonde won four Mid Tipperary SHC medals between 1970 and 1977. He was also part of the Moyne–Templetuohy team that beat Roscrea by 2-08 to 0-06 to claim the Tipperary SHC title in 1971.

At inter-county level, Esmonde first played for Tipperary as a dual player at under-21 level. He won an All-Ireland U21HC medal after lining out at wing-back in the 1-08 to 1-07 win over Dublin in the 1967 All-Ireland under-21 final. Esmonde later spent three years with the senior team.

== Death ==
Esmonde died on 16 July 2017, at the age of 70.

== Honours ==
Moyne–Templetuohy

- Tipperary Senior Hurling Championship: 1971
- Mid Tipperary Senior Hurling Championship: 1970, 1972, 1976, 1977

Tipperary

- All-Ireland Under-21 Hurling Championship: 1967
- Munster Under-21 Hurling Championship: 1967
