= Carol Pontzer =

American immunologist

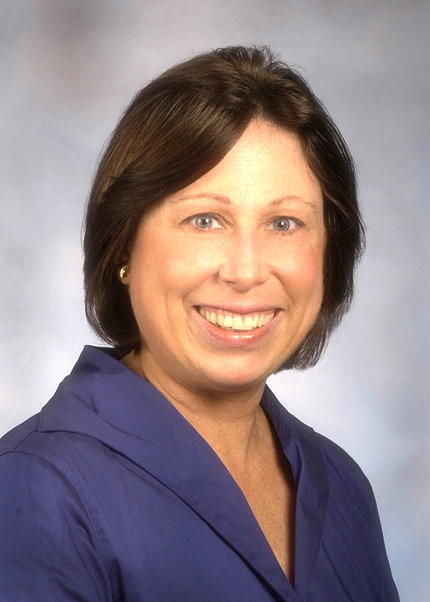
- Pontzer in 2002
- Born: July 12, 1954; Bethesda, Maryland, US
- Died: July 15, 2017 (aged 63)
- Education: Marquette University
- Scientific career
- Fields: Immunology
- Workplaces: University of Maryland, College Park; National Center for Complementary and Integrative Health

Carol Hanlon Pontzer (July 12, 1954 – July 15, 2017) was an American immunologist. She was a program director at the National Center for Complementary and Integrative Health. Pontzer was previously a professor of immunology at that University of Maryland, College Park.

== Education ==
Born in Bethesda, Pontzer completed a Ph.D. in biology from Marquette University. She received her postdoctoral training at the University of Florida. It was there that she began working on structural studies of type I interferons and binding of staphylococcal enterotoxins to MHC using synthetic peptide mimetics and inhibitors. Together with Howard Johnson and Fuller Bazer, she identified and characterized the activity of a novel subtype of interferon, interferon tau.

== Career ==
Pontzer worked at the department of cell biology and molecular genetics at the University of Maryland, College Park (UMD). There she worked on the structure/function relationship of immune modifiers, creating a panel of type I interferons with mutations that altered receptor binding, JAK/STAT signaling and subsequent activity and toxicity. Pontzer taught immunology and microbiology for 11 years at UMD. She continued to teach immunology online until her death.

Pontzer joined the National Center for Complementary and Integrative Health (NCCIH) as a scientific review officer in 2002. She later became a program director in the division of extramural research. Pontzer oversaw a grants portfolio on complementary health approaches intended to modulate immunity. This included mitigation of symptoms, such as inflammation, and use of natural product interventions in diseases such as asthma/allergy and arthritis. She was a basic scientist with expertise in immunologic, genomic and proteomic methodologies.

== Personal life ==
Pontzer died of brain cancer on July 15, 2017.
