= Heberto Neblina =

Mexican politician

- Born: 17 February 1969 (age 57); San Luis Río Colorado, Sonora, Mexico
- Occupation: Deputy
- Political party: PAN

Heberto Neblina Vega (born 17 February 1969) is a Mexican politician affiliated with the PAN. As of 2013 he served as Deputy of the LXII Legislature of the Mexican Congress representing Sonora.
