= Jon St. Andre =

American ski jumper

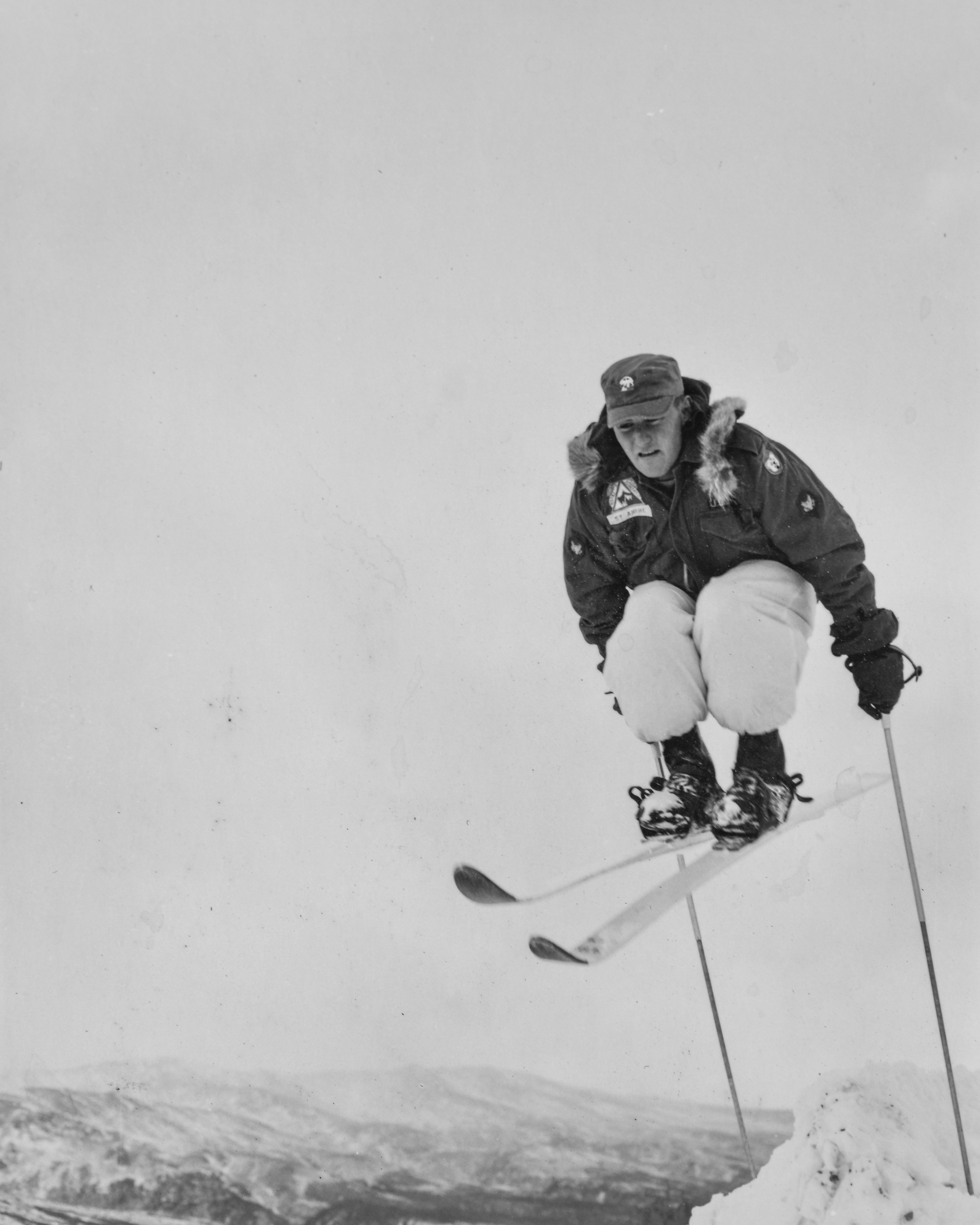

Jon James St. Andre (December 8, 1939 – July 11, 2017) was an American ski jumper who competed in the 1960 Winter Olympics. He was born in Ishpeming, Michigan.
