= Horace Harned =

American politician in the state of Mississippi

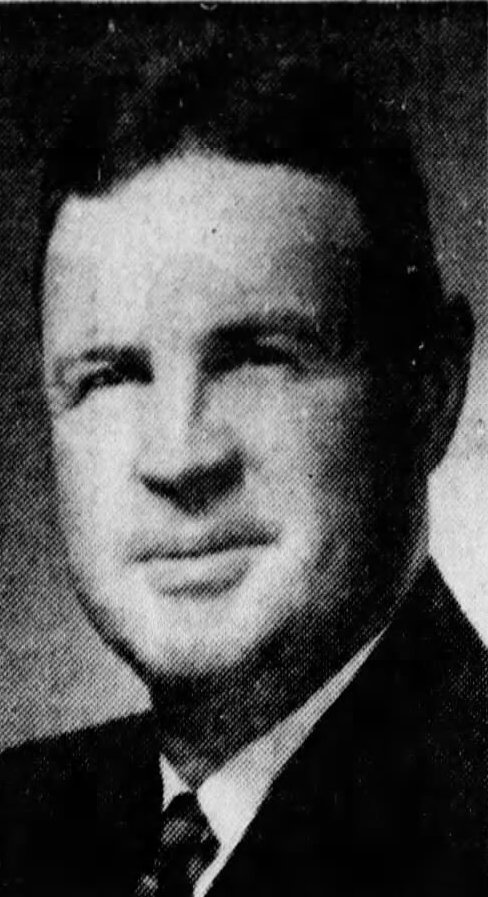
- Harned circa 1962

Member of the Mississippi State Senate from the 23rd district
- In office January 1952 – January 1956

Member of the Mississippi House of Representatives from the 23-A district
- In office January 1960 – January 1980

Personal details
- Born: July 27, 1920 State College, Mississippi
- Died: July 2, 2017 (aged 96) Starkville, Mississippi
- Party: Democratic
- Spouse: Nellie Jean Howell
- Occupation: Farmer, dairyman

Horace Hammerton Harned Jr. (July 27, 1920 – July 2, 2017) was an American politician in the state of Mississippi. He served in the Mississippi House of Representatives and Mississippi State Senate. A Democrat, he was one of seven legislators who sat on the segregationist Mississippi State Sovereignty Commission in the 1960s. He served in the Senate from 1952 to 1956, and in the House from 1960 to 1980.

Harned lived in Starkville, Mississippi. He served on the executive committee of Citizens Council.
