= Évelyne Prouvost =

French media proprietor and businesswoman (1939–2017)

- Born: 16 April 1939
- Died: 19 July 2017 (aged 78); Le Palais, Belle-Ile, Morbihan, France
- Occupation: Businesswoman
- Spouses: Arnold de Contades; Nicholas Berry
- Children: 5, including Arnaud de Contades
- Relatives: Jean Prouvost (grandfather); Michael Berry, Baron Hartwell (father-in-law)

Évelyne Prouvost (French pronunciation: [evlin pʁuvo]), also known as Évelyne Prouvost-Berry (16 April 1939 – 19 July 2017) was a French heiress and businesswoman. She was the chief executive of the Marie Claire Group, a publisher of 12 magazines in 30 countries, including Marie Claire.

== Early life ==
Évelyne Prouvost was the granddaughter of Jean Prouvost, the founder of Marie Claire and Paris Match as well as the owner of Le Figaro, RTL and Télé 7 Jours. She had a sister, Marie-Laure, and a half-sister, Donatienne.

== Career ==
Prouvost began her career as an editor for Parents, one of her grandfather's magazine, at the age of 27. In 1973, she launched the French version of Cosmopolitan in 1973. In 1976, she purchased some of her grandfather's assets, including Marie Claire. She founded the Marie Claire Group, a publisher of 12 magazines in 30 countries, including Cosmopolitan, Marie Claire, Avantages, Famili, La Revue du vin de France, Stylist and 100 Idées. Her magazines promoted left-leaning, feminist ideas. Through the Marie Claire Group, she was also a shareholder of Téva, a French television station.

Prouvost retired in 2004, but she retained 58% of Marie Claire Group. She became a knight of the Legion of Honour in 2011.

== Personal life and death ==
Prouvost was married twice. She married Arnold de Contades at the age of 19. They had three children, including Arnaud de Contades. She later married Nicholas Berry, the son of Michael Berry, Baron Hartwell. She had five children in total.

Prouvost was worth an estimated €125 million in 2016.

Prouvost died of a bicycle fall in Le Palais on the island of Belle-Ile on 19 July 2017, at the age of 78.

== Works ==
- Prouvost, Evelyne, ed. (1977). Les toits dans le paysage. Strasbourg. OCLC 636887436.
- Prouvost, Evelyne (2004). 50 ans de la vie des femmes : 1954-2004. Paris: Marie Claire Editions. OCLC 718617967.
