= Agostino Cilardo =

Italian academic (specialist in Islamic studies)

Agostino Cilardo (San Prisco, 19 August 1947 – San Prisco, 15 July 2017) was an Italian professor, Arabist and specialist in Islamic studies.

He was a professor at the University of Naples "L'Orientale". He was also the Dean of the Faculty of Arabic-Islamic and Mediterranean Studies since November 2006 in Political Science for the Near and Middle East (1974) and Islamic Studies (1981).

His career began as a lecturer at the University of Naples "L'Orientale", receiving three times the award for his scientific activity at the I.U.O.; four scholarships by the Egyptian government, a scholarship by the Centro per le Relazioni Italo Arabe (Rome), and a scholarship by the Consiglio Nazionale delle Ricerche (Rome). At the beginning of his career he also worked as lecturer at the University of Bari in the Faculties of Economics and of Foreign Languages and Literatures. In 1993 he completed a four-year course of theology at the Higher Institute of Religious Sciences of Capua (Caserta). In 1990 he was appointed as a teacher of Islamic law at the Faculty of Political Sciences (I.U.O., Naples); in 1992 he became associate professor of Juridical and Social Institutions of the Muslim World at the School of Islamic Studies. In 2005 he became full professor of History and Institutions of the Muslim World.

He was the editor of Studi Magrebini from 2003, and editor of the series "Arab-Islamic Culture" (Edizioni Scientifiche Italiane, Naples) since 2011.

== Main publications ==
- Teorie sulle origini del diritto islamico, Istituto per l'Oriente Carlo Alfonso Nallino, Rome 1990
- Presenza araba e islamica in Campania (ed.), I.U.O., Naples 1992
- Diritto ereditario islamico delle scuole giuridiche ismailita e imamita. Casistica, Istituto per l’Oriente - Istituto Universitario Orientale, Rome-Naples 1993
- Diritto ereditario islamico delle scuole giuridiche sunnite (hanafita, malikita, shafi‘ita e hanbalita) e delle scuole giuridiche zaydita, zahirita e ibadita. Casistica, Istituto per l’Oriente - Istituto Universitario Orientale, Rome-Naples 1994
- I. Goldziher, Lezioni sull’islam (transl. and ed.), Edizioni Scientifiche Italiane, Naples 2000
- Il diritto islamico e il sistema giuridico italiano. Le bozze di intesa tra la Repubblica Italiana e le Associazioni islamiche italiane, Edizioni Scientifiche Italiane, Naples 2002
- L’islam oggi (ed.), Edizioni Dehoniane, Bologna 1993 (reprint, 2004)
- The Qur’anic term kalala. Studies in the Arabic language and poetry, hadith, tafsir and fiqh. Notes on the origin of the Islamic law, Edinburgh University Press, Edinburgh 2005
- (and Francesco Mennillo), Due sistemi a confronto. La famiglia nell’islam e nel diritto canonico, CEDAM, Padua 2009
- La tutela dei minori di cultura islamica nell’area mediterranea. Aspetti sociali, giuridici e medici, Edizioni Scientifiche Italiane, Naples 2011
- The origins of the Isma‘ili jurisprudence. The Minhaj al-fara’id of al-qadi Abu Hanifa al-Nu‘man (in print)
