= Mamy Rakotoarivelo =

Malagasy politician

Mamy Rakotoarivelo (died on 28 July 2017) was a Malagasy politician. A member of the National Assembly of Madagascar, he was elected as a member of the Tiako I Madagasikara party in the 2007 Malagasy parliamentary election, representing the third constituency of Antananarivo. He was found dead on 28 July 2017 with a gunshot wound and a gun near his hands.

He had been the minister of communication in 2002, vice-president of the National Assembly, General Secretary of Tiako i Madagasikara, former president of the Malagasy Judo Federation and the former president of the Malagasy Olympic Committee. He also was a former journalist and director of the newspaper Midi Madagasikara.
