= Sergio Sorrentino =

Italian sailor

Sergio Sorrentino (19 July 1924 – 1 July 2017) was an Italian sailor who competed in the 1956 Summer Olympics and the 1964 Summer Olympics.
