= Robert Grodt =

American anarchist (1989–2017)

- Born: February 23, 1989
- Died: July 6, 2017 (aged 28); Raqqa, Syria
- Other name: Demhat Goldman
- Children: 1
- Military career
- Allegiance: Rojava
- Branch: People's Defense Units (YPG)
- Conflicts: Syrian Civil War; Rojava conflict; War against the Islamic State

Robert Grodt (1989–2017) was an American activist and volunteer fighter. Born in California, he worked as an organizer for human and civil rights groups before gaining media attention as a street medic at Occupy Wall Street in 2011, after he treated a pepper-sprayed protester who had been in a viral video. The two later became a couple and their daughter was dubbed the "Occubaby" by the media. They moved near Albany, New York. In 2017, Grodt joined the Kurdish People's Defense Units (YPG) to fight the Islamic State. He was killed several months later during the battle for Raqqa.

== Biography ==
Robert Grodt was born on February 23, 1989, as one of six children born to Tammy and Wayne Grodt, an early childhood teacher and an aerospace engineer. He was born in Mountain View, California and raised in Simi Valley. He graduated from University of California, Santa Cruz and worked as an organizer with the American Civil Liberties Union, Amnesty International, and other human and civic rights groups.

Grodt hitchhiked across the country to join the 2011 Occupy Wall Street protest, where he volunteered as a street medic. In one incident, he treated another protester, Kaylee Dedrick, who had been pepper-sprayed. A video of the event went viral. The Associated Press described this and other images of pepper-sprayed protesters as helping to "galvanize" the Occupy movement. The attention turned to their developing relationship, which was covered in New York tabloids. He proposed to her at Zuccotti Park, the site of the occupation, on New Year's Eve. The next year, their daughter, Tegan, was born. The media called her the "Occubaby" because she was conceived at the Occupy encampment. They settled near Albany, New York, near Dedrick's family, and where Grodt worked as a produce manager at a Price Chopper supermarket.

Grodt learned about the Rojava conflict in the Syrian civil war from the Internet and political circles. He grew incensed at the Islamic State and wanted to support Kurdish autonomy. He also had a friend who had joined in 2016. After several months of contemplation, he left upstate New York in February 2017 to join the Kurdish militia, the People's Defense Units (YPG), to fight the Islamic State. He had no prior military training besides rifle target shooting in his youth. Grodt intended to return a few months later, in August, after taking the militia's short training and completing a round of service. His group of volunteers was nicknamed "the 50/50" based on a scene in War Dogs in which they had a split chance of living. The Kurdish militia attracted about 500 other Americans to its socialist cause, similar to the Lincoln Battalion during the Spanish Civil War. Grodt's nom de guerre was Demhat Goldman.

He died on July 6, 2017, outside Raqqa, during the 2017 battle to reclaim the city. The Kurdish militia said they had been ambushed by Islamic State militants. His squad was advancing the front line by clearing several buildings each night with night-vision goggles, one floor at a time. The six-person squad was returning from the operation, moving between damaged buildings inside the city on the east frontline. One squadmate triggered a landmine set as a trap, as Islamic State members ambushed the squad with small arms and rocket-propelled grenades. Grodt likely died instantly from a nearby rocket. Two other members of the "50/50" group died with Grodt, and only one member of the squad lived. Newspaper sources reported that Grodt died by an improvised explosive device or land mine. To recover his body, the Kurdish militia fought two kilometers to the ambush site under Islamic State attack. Grodt's remains have not been repatriated as of August 2017.

Mourners held a memorial service for Grodt at Zuccotti Park, the site of Occupy Wall Street, featuring speakers, a video sendoff from the Kurdish militia, and a red-and-black flag.
