= Eric Moore (footballer, born 1925) =

Australian rules footballer

Personal information
- Full name: Eric Russel Moore
- Born: 25 December 1925
- Died: 25 July 2017 (aged 91)
- Original team: Malvern Amateurs
- Height: 175 cm (5 ft 9 in)
- Weight: 68 kg (150 lb)

Playing career^{1}
Years	Club	Games (Goals)
1948–1950	Fitzroy	19 (14)
- ^{1} Playing statistics correct to the end of 1950.

Eric Russel Moore (25 December 1925 – 25 July 2017) was an Australian rules footballer who played for the Fitzroy Football Club in the Victorian Football League (VFL).
