= Tim Hollier =

- Born: 1947; Brighton, England
- Died: 5 July 2017 (aged 69–70)
- Genres: Folk
- Occupation(s): Singer-songwriter, music publisher
- Years active: Mid-1960s–1974
- Labels: United Artists, Fontana, Philips, York

Tim Hollier (1947 – 5 July 2017) was a British folk musician who released several albums in the late 1960s and 1970s. He went on to work in music publishing.

== Career ==
Born in Brighton in 1947, Hollier was raised in West Cumberland. In the mid-1960s he moved to London where he became involved in the city's folk scene, playing in the duo the Sovereigns. He graduated in Fine Arts and Graphic Design in 1968, and was signed by United Artists Records, who released his debut album, Message to a Harlequin, in October that year, described by Allmusic as "hauntingly beautiful". In November he recorded a session for the BBC's Night Ride radio show.

In 1969 he moved to Fontana Records, releasing his self-titled second album the following year. He followed this with Sky Sail in 1971 on Philips Records, described by Allmusic as Hollier's "magnum opus". He performed several times on radio, including a half-hour Tim Hollier and Friends show on BBC Radio 1 in 1970.

In 1973 he started the Songwriters Workshop label, signing artists such as Peter Sarstedt and later Ed Welch.

Hollier's final solo album was The Story of Mill Reef (1974), a collection of songs about the famous race horse recorded for a Yorkshire TV documentary.

In the late 1970s Hollier teamed up with Chris Cooksey and Lynda Taylor in the shortlived group the Softrock, releasing one album in 1980. He also started the Softrock Music publishing company.

Having moved into music publishing in the late 1970s, in 1983 he co-founded Filmtrax plc, which went on to own major catalogues including the ABBA Catalogue of Songs, Columbia Pictures Music Group, Novello & Co, and Belwin Mills. In 1984 he acquired Leosong, retaining a 25% share in the company and serving as chairman until leaving in 1996 after disagreements with majority shareholder Mark Levinson. In 1999 he founded Screen Music Services, and later co-founded Music Copyright Solutions plc. In 2008 he co-founded the Atlantic Screen Group of companies.

Hollier died on 5 July 2017 due to complications of surgery.

== Discography ==
=== Albums ===
- Message to a Harlequin (1968), United Artists
- Tim Hollier (1970), Fontana
- Sky Sail (1971), Philips
- The Story of Mill Reef (1974). York

=== Singles ===
- "In This Room" (1970), Fontana
- "The Circle Is Small" (1971), Philips
