= Jack MacGregor =

Australian rules footballer

Personal information
- Born: 15 September 1932; Fitzroy North
- Died: 24 July 2017 (aged 84)
- Original team: Northcote

Playing career^{1}
Years	Club	Games (Goals)
1952–1958	Fitzroy	87 (23)
- ^{1} Playing statistics correct to the end of 1958.

Jack MacGregor (15 September 1932 – 24 July 2017) was an Australian rules footballer who played for the Fitzroy Football Club in the Australian Football League (VFL) from 1952 until 1958, playing 87 games and kicking 23 goals. He had previously played for Northcote Football Club in the Victorian Football Association.
