= Thomas Haskell (historian) =

American historian (1939–2017)

Thomas L. Haskell (1939 – July 12, 2017) was an American historian. He joined the faculty of Rice University in 1970, and was the Samuel G. McCann Professor of History.

Born in 1939, Haskell earned a bachelor's degree from Princeton University in 1961. He began teaching at Rice University in 1970 and obtained his doctorate from Stanford University in 1973. Haskell received a Guggenheim Fellowship in 1986. He was named professor emeritus in 2009 and died at the age of 78 in 2017, due to complications of Alzheimer's disease.
