= Saunders Schultz =

American sculptor

- Born: July 16, 1927; St. Louis, Missouri, U.S.
- Died: July 17, 2017 (aged 90); St. Louis, Missouri, U.S.
- Education: Washington University in St. Louis; University of Illinois at Urbana-Champaign
- Known for: Site-specific Sculpture, Environmental Sculpture
- Awards: Carnegie Institute Achievement Award First Prize at the Invitational Competition; University of Wisconsin-Green Bay "Finite/Infinite", first public art project awarded by Civilian Facilities Administration; The Florida AlA Award for Excellence First Prize

Saunders Schultz (1927—2017) was an American sculptor known for relating his sculptures with their architectural surroundings. His work includes Site-Specific Sculpture, Nature-Interactive Sculpture, Science-Interactive Sculpture.

== Education and career ==
Schultz was born in St. Louis, Missouri in 1927 to Rose and Abraham Schultz. Before graduating high school, he worked as an artist in the St. Louis area by painting murals for local businesses. He received a Bachelor of Fine Arts from Washington University School of Fine Arts, St. Louis, in 1950 and subsequently was the recipient of a fellowship to the University of Illinois at Urbana-Champaign, where he received his Master of Fine Arts in 1952.

In 1960, along with fellow sculptor Bill Severson, Schultz founded "Scopia", a sculpture studio in Chesterfield, Missouri. After which, he became one of the founders of Environmental Sculpture.

As a sculptor, painter, educator, and author, Schultz is considered one of the founding fathers of architectural art in an environmental context. Schultz taught master classes and symposia at various universities including Harvard University School of Landscape Architecture, Harvard University Graduate School of Design, and Columbia Graduate School of Architecture, Planning and Preservation.

His sculpture has been published in ARTnews, Architectural Record, Architectural Forum, and many others.

== Collaboration with architects ==
Schultz collaborated with architects and landscape designers including Eero Saarinen, Minoru Yamasaki, Hideo Sasaki, Art Gensler, EDAW, Mitchell/Giurgola, RTKL, Ellerbe Becket, Erich Mendelsohn, Edward D. Stone, Jr., Thomas Ventullett III, and Theodore Wofford. Schultz also worked on proposed projects with Pietro Belluschi, Benjamin Thompson, and The Architects Collaborative.

== Works ==
Schultz's sculptures vary from model-size to twenty-seven stories tall and are located in thirty-five states and the District of Columbia, as well as Moscow, Singapore and Saudi Arabia. His works have been shown in numerous exhibitions including Plastics, USA and the European Exhibit of the United States Information Agency, and the Moscow College of Industrial and Applied Arts in the former Soviet Union. He defined himself as a site-specific sculptor, developing projects with a social consciousness, projects he described as having "collaborative community envisioning". One such effort is still ongoing, the Eco Arch, proposed for the East St. Louis riverfront.

=== Site-specific sculpture ===
==== Continuum (2015, last sculpture) ====
Schultz installed his last creation in November 2015, a sculpture titled "Continuum", commissioned by the company re-branding itself from "The Brown Shoe Company" to "Caleres", and fabricated by Maker Technical Sculpture Services, of Toronto, Canada. The stainless steel sculpture, weighing 3,700 pounds, sits on top of a fountain designed by project architect Theodore Wofford.

==== Finite Infinite (1970) ====
"Finite Infinite" is a 260' tall x 60' wide brick carving on the side of the Council Towers, a twenty-seven story building in St. Louis. Schultz drew the basic design on the concrete wall, sketching one and one-half stories above the brick masons. The parabolic arches move both up and down over the wall, alluding to both the nearby Gateway Arch of St. Louis and the image in the ceiling of Michelangelo's Sistine Chapel Ceiling where God and Adam almost touch. The line down the center becomes the possible touch with the perfect circle of God above the imperfect circle of humans below.

St. Louis Post-Dispatch editor-publisher Joseph Pulitzer, Jr. had this impression: "Finite-Infinite manages a dynamic relationship with the arch, giving it a different context. Its monumental size and elegant design adds significantly to the vitality of St. Louis."

==== Flamma (1990) ====
"Flamma" is a collaboration with Geoffrey Post, Arthur Gensler, and Russ Butler (EDAW). The client was Enron who wanted to show its commitment to Omaha upon moving its regional headquarters from Omaha, Nebraska to Houston, Texas. "Flamma"'s form is two expanding polished stainless helical flames that reflect and mirror, as in numerous other Schultz sculptures, the ever-changing colors and textures of its surroundings. The sculpture is 28' tall x 18' wide x 12' deep.

==== Yod Menorah (1984) ====
"Yod Menorah" consists of seven polished stainless steel Yods which represent the Jewish letter for God, and the structure stands 26' tall x 28' wide x 28' deep. In one interview, Schultz recounted: "When I was invited to Washington as one of the five finalists I was told, "If it's not Jewish we won't pay for it - and if it is Jewish we will not pay for it because we believe in the ecumenical spirit." When a Baptist woman asked me, "Do you mind if I love it? To me it represents hands reaching upward.", I knew the sculpture was a success."

=== Nature-interactive sculpture ===
==== Cosmos (1984) ====
"Cosmos" is a 20' tall x 90' wide x 40' deep bronze and stainless structure designed for Sheik Ahmed Juffali, Chairman of the Board and CEO of Juffali Industries, Saudi Arabia. Schultz worked with Bill Severson, fellow sculptor, Author Love of Ellerby Becket, architect, Julie Monk, interior designer, Arthur Monsey, Ph.D., structural engineer, John H. Scandrett, Ph.D. and David K. Hudson, Ph.D., physicists, and Charles Schweighauser, astronomer to design a sculpture that in Schultz's words, "has origins in historic Arabic astronomy as well as contemporary scientific concepts."

==== Trephonia (1986) ====
"Trephonia" was created for Sears and subsidiary, Homart Development Company to demonstrate distinct contemporary vision to the Dallas community and to celebrate the dynamic wind force in the area. Mounted on a mounded traffic circle between office towers, Trephonia is composed of thirty-six polished stainless steel "trees", each at 42' tall x 25' wide x 25' deep, containing instruments which resonate differently in the wind according to their position and weight. Schultz collaborated with Richard O'Donnell, St. Louis Symphony percussionist, who designed the instruments to play music tuned to the pentatonic scale. The design team consisted of Schultz and Bill Severson, sculptors, Taylor-Hewlet, architect, Hellmuth/Obata/Kassabaum, landscape architect, Arthur Monsey, engineer, and Jack Ramsey, mechanical engineer. An article published at the time about the piece opened with "Heard any good sculpture lately?".

==== Primogenesis (1981) ====
Schultz collaborated with Fred Guyton, architect, Richard Cummings, architectural consultant, Arthur Monsey, engineer, Jack Ramsey, structural engineer, John Higginbotham, mechanical engineer, George Monnig, computer scientist, and Bill Severson, sculptor on this 25' tall x 25' wide x 25' deep stainless steel sculpture. "Primogenesis", which translates to "first origins" because all energies' origin is the sun, is an example of a kinetic form which operates on free energy. It is mounted in the center of a small lake in Oak Knoll Park, Clayton, Missouri. Solar energy powers the sculpture, which rotates around a central shaft one and one-half times every two hours in sunlight. Two panels covered with thirty-six silicon coated disks convert the sun's rays into electricity.

=== Science-interactive sculpture ===
==== Cauchuc Grid (1986) (ARTnews January 1986 and Architectural Record November 1986) ====
Standing 30' tall x 18' wide x 30' deep, "Cauchuc Grid" is an oval sculpture and fountain created from three tons of polished stainless steel tubing dispersing 1,150 gallons of water per minute. Cauchuc or caoutchouc refers to the computer-generated rubber grids incorporated in the design. A computerized control system orchestrates a complex pattern of water from virtually all directions creating an arching form enhanced by rainbows constantly generated in the mist. Collaborating with Schultz were Robert Savage, architect, Crose-Gardner, landscape architects, and Bill Severson, fellow sculptor. The sculpture is located at the Regency West Office Park, Des Moines, Iowa.

==== Essence (1971) ====
"Essence" is a sculpture designed for the Ralston Purina company and is located at its headquarters in St. Louis. A protein molecule cross-section, created by slicing the protein molecule using a process called x-ray diffraction, was the inspiration for "Essence", a three-dimensional representation of the molecule. The design team included Schultz, sculptor, Hellmuth/Obata/Kassabaum, architect, and Arthur Monsey, engineer.

==== Linea (1982) ====
"Linea" is an 80' tall sculpture in Columbus, Ohio. Dale Perkinson, President of Linclay Corporation, and his architects, Bohm-NBBJ, invited Schultz, Bill Severson, fellow sculptor, Robert Goets, landscape architect, and Arthur Monsey, engineer to be part of the design team for the project. The sculpture's basic structure is a triangle with an open helix framework, allowing for low wind resistance and great strength. The sculpture is an example of the merging of science and aesthetics.

== Awards ==
Schultz was the recipient of both national and international awards including: Carnegie Institute Achievement Award First Prize at the Invitational Competition, University of Wisconsin-Green Bay "Finite/Infinite", first public art project awarded by Civilian Facilities Administration (forerunner of HUD). Later selected by jury from 1,700 international entries for publication in HUD's National Community Arts Program, The Florida AlA Award for Excellence First Prize, Highland Garden, Broward County Florida Housing Authority, HUD Invitational Competition, The National Association of Counties Award, Oppenstein Park, Kansas City, Missouri.
