= Joan Calabrese =

American fashion designer (1939–2017)

Joan Frances Calabrese (October 29, 1939 – July 16, 2017) was an American fashion designer specialising in children's high end clothing.

== Early life ==
Joan Calabrese, born on October 29, 1939, was raised in Philadelphia, Pennsylvania. Joan displayed a love for fashion from a very early age when she began designing and sewing clothes for her dolls. Calabrese once noted, "my mother said as soon as I could hold a pencil I was drawing costumes and people." She studied fashion illustration at the Pennsylvania Academy of the Fine Arts, and was offered a full scholarship which she declined in order to work with family.

== Work ==
She began styling children's clothing when she first made dresses for her two daughters, Marisa Moore and Elena Calabrese. As she made these dresses, her cousin, Tom Marotta, who was at that time Vice President of Saks Fifth Avenue's couture department, was intrigued by her designs and had Joan introduce her dresses to the store. This children's boutique, owned by Linda Berman, began buying her self-sewn dresses, which started off her career. For the first couple of years of sewing dresses, she only worked on them herself, but as her children's dresses got introduced into her boutiques she began to hire seamstress. As she became more known, her dresses were carried in Cerutti's on Madison Avenue, New York. After Saks Fifth Avenue began selling her clothing, other retailers ordered her designs.

She was one of the few stylist for high style clothing for children. Calabrese also made women's handbags, but was more inspired to do children's clothing and continued on with couture for kids.

For many years she worked under her own label, Joan Calabrese INC. She bought her own fabrics from Paris, Europe, where she traveled twice a year. Her office was primarily in the basement of her house in Newtown Square, Pennsylvania. Many people in the high end world scheduled to meet with her in order to get specialized dresses for their children. When she first started creating these unique dresses she made about 2500 dresses a year by herself.

== Career ==
Her early designs were very expensive, costing up to $400 in 1982, mainly due to her focus on the best fabrics from Europe. She described how she tried to individualize her materials and make her pieces unique and special. In an interview with Drexel University, Joan said many of her customers considered the gowns a family heirloom to be passed from generation to generation.

Pieces of Calabrese's clothing are held in the permanent collections of The Metropolitan Museum of Art, who accepted two of Joan's dresses for the Permanent Collection of their Costume Institute,^{[6]} and she is also featured in the Costume Collection of the Philadelphia Museum of Art.^{[7]} In order to be a part of these museums, an artists' work was judged and then approved. Joan Calabrese being the designer, marketer and sales-person of her clothing, introduced her own work to the museum by calling and setting up a date to observe her work in order to consider it for these museums.

Calabrese clients included Natalie Wood, members of the Kennedy family, Nancy Sinatra and Betsy Bloomingdale. Willow Smith wore her dress in the Fashion Catwalk at The Dubai Mall. When Dakota Fanning attended the 2003 Emmys, aged 9, she wore a Calabrese design on the red carpet.

She won the DEBI award in 2016.

=== Mon Cheri ===
As Joan Calabrese got older, she entered into a licensing agreement with Mon Cheri for about 10 years, during which she designed an affordable range of flower girl and First Communion dresses .

== Death ==
Calabrese died of uterine cancer on July 16, 2017 in Newtown Square, Pennsylvania, aged 77.
