= Heberto Sein =

Mexican activist and diplomat (1898–1977)

Heberto Sein (1898–1977) was a Mexican Quaker leader, peace activist, language interpreter and diplomat.

Born in Matehuala, San Luis Potosí, Mexico, Sein was a founder of the Mexico City Friends Meeting and Friends House. He was married to a Swiss-born Quaker, Suzanne Sein. He was an interpreter at the founding of the League of Nations and later with the International Labor Organization. He also promoted the workcamps of the American Friends Service Committee in Mexico. He was part of the larger struggle in Latin America for non-violent social change. He was often invited to speak on peace in the United States, and was a strong yet tactful voice at international peace conferences throughout the world. The Casa Heberto Sein, a Quaker Center in Hermosillo, Sonora, Mexico is named for him.
