= María Amuchástegui =

Argentine television fitness instructor

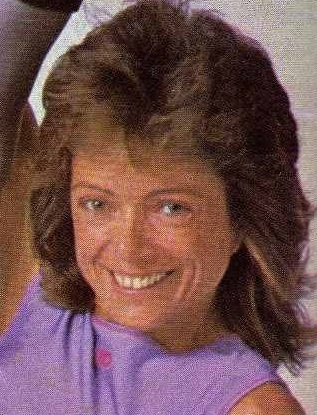
- Born: 16 January 1953; Buenos Aires, Argentina
- Died: 19 July 2017 (aged 64); Buenos Aires, Argentina
- Occupation(s): Television fitness instructor, ballerina, singer
- Years active: 1982–2017
- Spouse: Juan José Alberdi (divorced)

María Amuchástegui (16 January 1953 – 19 July 2017) was an Argentine television fitness instructor, ballerina, and singer. She was born in Buenos Aires. She became well known in Argentina in the 1980s. Her best known morning fitness shows were Buen día Salud and Buen Día, María, both were made in the 1980s. She was also best known for the 2006 song "Camino de espejos".

== Career ==
In 1983, she conducted her Buen día Salud program, which was broadcast in the morning of ATC until 1986. She then moved on to Channel 11 and El Trece with a more journalistic and higher-volume program, which she called Buen Día, María. She was accompanied by Dr. Eduardo Lorenzo Borocoto, who provided data on physical health, and a group of girls who were called Las Marias.

She continued working with Telefe until 2012.

== Personal life ==
Amuchástegui was born in Buenos Aires. She was married to Juan Alberdi until they divorced. They had one son, Juan (born 1988).

Amuchástegui died in Buenos Aires on 19 July 2017 of a stroke complicated by lung cancer at the age of 64.

== Discography ==
- 2005. Camino de espejos - CNR DISCOS S.R.L.
