= 2017 in music =

This topic covers notable events and articles related to 2017 in music.

== Specific locations ==
- African
- American
- Asian
- Australian
- Brazilian
- British
- Canadian
- Chinese
- Danish
- European
- Finnish
- French
- German
- Icelandic
- Indian
- Irish
- Japanese
- Latin
- Malaysian
- Mongolian
- Norwegian
- Philippine
- Polynesian
- Scandinavian
- South Korean
- Swedish
- Taiwanese
- Vietnamese
- World

== Specific genres ==
- Classical
- Country
- Electronic
- Jazz
- Latin
- Heavy metal
- Hip-hop
- Rock
- R&B
- New Wave
- Opera
- Pop
- Progressive rock
- Punk
- K-pop
- J-pop

== Awards ==
59th Annual Grammy Awards (USA)
Record of the Year: "Hello" by Adele • Album of the Year: 25 by Adele • Song of the Year: "Hello" by Adele • Best New Artist: Chance the Rapper
18th Annual Latin Grammy Awards (USA/Latin America)
Record of the Year: "Despacito" by Luis Fonsi and Daddy Yankee • Album of the Year: Salsa Big Band by Rubén Blades and Roberto Delgado & Orquesta• Song of the Year: "Despacito" by Luis Fonsi and Daddy Yankee • Best New Artist: Vicente García
2017 ARIA Music Awards (Australia)
Album of the Year: Go Farther in Lightness by Gang of Youths • Song of the Year: "Stranger" by Peking Duk feat. Elliphant• Breakthrough Artist: Night Thinker by Amy Shark
2017 Billboard Music Awards (USA)
Artist of the Year: Drake • New Artist of the Year: Zayn • Top Hot 100 Song: "Closer" by the Chainsmokers feat. Halsey • Top Billboard 200 Album: Views by Drake
2017 Brit Awards (UK)
British Album of the Year: Blackstar by David Bowie • British Single of the Year: "Shout Out to My Ex" by Little Mix • British Breakthrough Act: Rag'n'Bone Man • British Video: "History" by One Direction
Eurovision Song Contest 2017 (Europe)
"Amar pelos dois" by Salvador Sobral (Portugal)
48th GMA Dove Awards (USA)
Song of the Year: "What a Beautiful Name" written by Brooke Ligertwood and Ben Fielding • Songwriter of the Year: Bart Millard • Songwriter of the Year (Non-artist): Bernie Herms • Artist of the Year: MercyMe • New Artist of the Year: Zach Williams • Producer of the Year:Bernie Herms
59th Japan Record Awards (Japan)
Grand Prix: Influencer by Nogizaka46 • Best Song: several • Best New Artist: Tsubaki Factory
2017 Juno Awards (Canada)
Artist of the Year: Leonard Cohen • Album of the Year: You Want It Darker by Leonard Cohen • Single of the Year: "Spirits" by The Strumbellas • Breakthrough Artist of the Year: Ruth B
2017 Mercury Prize (UK and Ireland)
Process by Sampha
2017 Mnet Asian Music Awards (South Korea, hosted in Vietnam, Japan and Hong Kong)
Artist of the Year: BTS • Album of the Year: The War by Exo • Song of the Year: "Signal" by Twice • Best Music Video: Spring Day by BTS
2017 MTV Europe Music Awards (Europe)
Video of the Year: "Humble" by Kendrick Lamar • Artist of the Year: Shawn Mendes • New Artist: Dua Lipa
2017 MTV Video Music Awards (USA)
Video of the Year: "Humble" by Kendrick Lamar • Artist of the Year: Ed Sheeran • New Artist: Khalid
2017 New Zealand Music Awards (New Zealand)
Album of the Year: Melodrama by Lorde • Song of the Year: "Green Light" by Lorde • Breakthrough Artist: Aldous Harding
2017 NME Music Awards (UK)
Best Album: Wild World by Bastille • Best Track: "Tilted" by Christine and the Queens • Best New Artist: Dua Lipa • Best Live Band: The 1975 • Best Festival: Glastonbury Festival 2016
2017 Polaris Music Prize (Canada)
La Papessa by Lido Pimienta
2017 Pulitzer Prize for Music (USA)
Angel's Bone by Du Yun
The 5th V Chart Awards (China)
Top Male Artist : Lay with Lose Control • Top Female Artist : Li Yuchun with Sense of Presence • Top Group: TFBOYS with Protecting Home • Top New Artist: Xu Weizhou
Rock and Roll Hall of Fame (USA)
Inductees: Joan Baez • Electric Light Orchestra • Journey • Pearl Jam • Tupac Shakur • Yes
26th Seoul Music Awards (South Korea)
Grand Prize: Exo • Best Album: Wings by BTS • Best Song: "Cheer Up" by Twice • Best New Artist: Blackpink, NCT 127, I.O.I

== Bands formed ==
- =LOVE
- The 8-Bit Big Band
- 22/7
- 3RACHA
- 7Senses
- 14U
- 22/7
- A.C.E
- Adoy
- Automatic
- Bad Wolves
- Be.A
- The Belair Lip Bombs
- Black Dresses
- Black Midi
- Bloodywood
- Blushing
- Bob Vylan
- Brats
- The Boyz
- Busters
- The Callous Daoboys
- Caroline
- Cellchrome
- Cheekface
- Chō Tokimeki Sendenbu
- CY8ER
- Creepy Nuts
- Cynhn
- Dimlim
- Dreamcatcher
- Dry Cleaning
- Duetto
- Elris
- Faky
- FanxyRed
- Favorite
- Fever 333
- Fleshwater
- Fontaines D.C.
- Fromis 9
- Ghost Light
- Giants in the Trees
- Gizmodrome
- Grayscale
- GreatGuys
- Golden Child
- Good Day
- Hash Tag
- Highlight
- Home is Where
- Honeyst
- Hyeongseop X Euiwoong
- Illuminati Hotties
- IN2IT
- In Real Life
- IZ
- JBJ
- Josh Todd and the Conflict
- Kneecap
- Last Idol
- Lovebites
- Leetspeak Monsters
- Longguo & Shihyun
- Måneskin
- Mastersystem
- Mellow Mellow
- Mind U
- MVP
- MXM
- My Indigo
- Myteen
- NGT48
- Novelbright
- Now United
- NU'EST W
- Odd Eye Circle
- ONF
- Pale Waves
- Pink Babies
- Pink Cres.
- Polkadot Stingray
- P.O.P
- Pom Poko
- Powerflo
- Pristin
- PVA
- Qyoto
- Rainz
- Rak-Su
- The Rampage from Exile Tribe
- The Rose
- Roselia
- RVG
- The Sea Within
- S.I.S
- Seven O'Clock
- Silverbacks
- Sons of Apollo
- Squid
- Stray Kids
- SudannaYuzuYully
- Superorganism
- Surfaces
- Terraplana
- They Are Gutting a Body of Water
- Top Secret
- TRCNG
- Triple H
- Tropical Fuck Storm
- Ukka
- Varsity
- Wanna One
- Wednesday
- Weki Meki
- Vespera
- YHBOYS
- Yorushika

== Soloist debuts ==
- Adieu
- Aima Baig
- Asca
- Ashe
- Au/Ra
- Baby Ariel
- Beverly
- Blanks
- Camila Cabello
- Cavetown
- Chelsea Cutler
- Cherry Ngan
- Clairo
- Conan Gray
- Curtismith
- Diamante
- Donny Pangilinan
- DPR Live
- Gabbi Garcia
- Harry Styles
- Haru Nemuri
- Hatchie
- Hiroomi Tosaka
- Hoàng Yến Chibi
- Huang Xiaoyun
- I
- I'll
- Jang Han-byul
- Jeong Se-woon
- Jeon So-yeon
- Joji
- Julia Michaels
- Kang Si-ra
- Kevin Oh
- Keina Suda
- Kim Chung-ha
- Kim Petras
- Kim So-hee
- Kriesha Chu
- KSI
- Liam Payne
- Leeroy
- Lauren Jauregui
- Lauv
- Lee Hae-ri
- Leellamarz
- Leila Alcasid
- Leony
- Lewis Capaldi
- Little Simz
- Luísa Sonza
- Maan
- Madison Beer
- Maisie Peters
- Masaki Suda
- Malu Trevejo
- Megan Thee Stallion
- Minzy
- Mxmtoon
- Niall Horan
- Nao Tōyama
- Nathy Peluso
- Niki
- Noa Kirel
- One
- Phoebe Bridgers
- Punch
- Queen Naija
- Ravi
- Rauw Alejandro
- Rena Nōnen
- Ruel
- Sabrina Claudio
- Sam Fender
- Samuel
- Saweetie
- Sayumi Michishige
- Sayuri
- Shuta Sueyoshi
- Seohyun
- Skylar Stecker
- Sōma Saitō
- Sojung
- Sophy Wong
- Soyou
- Suzy
- Tao Tsuchiya
- Violetta Zironi
- Volts Vallejo
- Woo Won-jae
- Youngji
- Yungblud

== Bands reformed ==
- As I Lay Dying
- Audioslave
- Big Dumb Face
- Carnivore
- Chimaira
- Company of Thieves
- Dreamcatcher
- Eagles
- Eighteen Visions
- Elastica
- Exhorder
- Heavy Load
- House vs. Hurricane
- Jawbreaker
- Jethro Tull
- The KLF
- Light This City
- Lionheart
- Madina Lake
- Nachtmystium
- NRG
- Orbital
- Pleymo
- Sadus
- Sleeper
- Steps
- The Streets
- Stornoway
- Sugarland
- Tripping Daisy
- Viva Brother
- The Union Underground
- Xscape

== Bands on hiatus ==
- Camera Obscura
- Cyntia
- Dark Sermon
- Dave Matthews Band
- Disclosure
- Flumpool
- fun.
- Girls’ Generation
- Ikimono-gakari
- The Gaslight Anthem
- Heart
- The Jezabels
- Katatonia
- Karnataka
- Linkin Park
- Mejibray
- Pinegrove
- PWR BTTM
- Slipknot
- Soundgarden
- Sphere
- Tackey & Tsubasa
- Tsubaki
- Twenty One Pilots
- Vamps
- With Confidence

== Bands disbanded ==
- A Tribe Called Quest
- Amoral
- As One
- Audioslave
- Black Sabbath
- Brontide
- The Cab
- Chairlift
- Cibo Matto
- Cinderella
- Circus Devils
- Coal Chamber
- C-ute
- The Crookes
- The Dillinger Escape Plan
- Doll Elements
- Donovan Wolfington
- Especia
- Friendzone
- Game Theory
- HIM
- Hail of Bullets
- Heaven's Basement
- Hilcrhyme
- In Dying Arms
- Letlive
- Les B.B.
- The Maccabees
- Marionette
- Mimi Meme Mimi
- Mindless Behavior
- Miss A
- Mobb Deep
- Mudcrutch
- The Pagans
- Plenty
- The Poster Boy
- Poured Out
- Prizmmy
- Reol
- Rev. from DVL
- The Roches
- The Saturdays
- Spawn of Possession
- Staind
- Sug
- Textures
- Those Who Fear
- Tom Petty and the Heartbreakers
- The Tragically Hip
- Trap Them
- Vallenfyre
- Vanna
- Vant
- We Are the Ocean
- White Ash
- White Miles
- William Control
- The Wonder Girls
- Xerath
- Yellowcard
- Your Memorial

== Deaths ==
=== January ===
- 1 – Memo Morales (79), Venezuelan rumba singer
- 2 – Auriel Andrew (69), Indigenous Australian country singer
- 4 – Bade Fateh Ali Khan (82), Pakistani classical music and Khyal singer
- 6 – Sylvester Potts (78), American R&B singer (the Contours)
- 7 – Jerzy Kossela (74), Polish rock guitarist (Czerwone Gitary)
- 8 – Peter Sarstedt (75), British folk pop singer
- 10 – Buddy Greco (90), American jazz singer and pianist
- 11 – Tommy Allsup (83), American rock and roll guitarist
- 13
  - Horacio Guarany (91), Argentine folklore singer
  - Richie Ingui (69), American soul singer (Soul Survivors)
- 14 – John Boudreaux (80), American jazz and soul drummer
- 15 – Greg Trooper (61), American alternative country singer and songwriter
- 16
  - William Onyeabor (70), Nigerian funk singer-songwriter
  - Steve Wright (66), American power pop bassist and songwriter (The Greg Kihn Band)
- 18 – Mike Kellie (69), British psychedelic rock and power pop drummer (Spooky Tooth, The Only Ones)
- 19 – Loalwa Braz (63), Brazilian pop and lambada singer (Kaoma)
- 20
  - Ronald "Bingo" Mundy (76), American singer (The Marcels)
  - Joey Powers (82), American pop singer
  - Tommy Tate (71), American soul singer
- 21
  - Karl Hendricks (46), American alternative rock singer (The Karl Hendricks Trio)
  - Walter "Junie" Morrison (62), American funk keyboardist (The Ohio Players, Parliament-Funkadelic)
  - Maggie Roche (65), American folk singer (The Roches)
- 22
  - Jaki Liebezeit (78), German experimental rock drummer (Can)
  - Pete Overend Watts (69), British glam rock bassist and singer (Mott the Hoople, British Lions)
- 23 – Bobby Freeman (76), American pop and R&B singer
- 24
  - Gil Ray (60), American power pop drummer (Game Theory, The Loud Family)
  - Butch Trucks (69), American rock drummer (The Allman Brothers Band, Les Brers)
- 25 – Ronnie Davis (66), Jamaican reggae singer (The Tennors, The Itals)
- 27 – Stan Boreson (91), American comedian, accordionist and singer
- 28
  - Guitar Gable (79), American blues singer and guitarist
  - Geoff Nicholls (68), British rock musician and keyboardist (Black Sabbath, Quartz)
  - Alexander Tikhanovich (64), Belarusian pop singer (Verasy)
- 29 – Elkin Ramírez (54), Colombian hard rock singer (Kraken)
- 30 – James Laurence (27), American hip hop musician and producer (Friendzone) (death announced on this date)
- 31
  - Deke Leonard (72), British progressive rock guitarist (Man)
  - John Wetton (67), British progressive rock singer, bassist, and songwriter (Asia, King Crimson)

=== February ===
- 1 – Robert Dahlqvist (40), Swedish alternative rock guitarist and singer (The Hellacopters, Thunder Express, Dundertåget)
- 4 – Steve Lang (67), Canadian rock bassist (April Wine)
- 5
  - David Axelrod (85), American jazz musician and producer
  - Sonny Geraci (70), American pop and rock singer (Climax, The Outsiders)
- 7 – Svend Asmussen (100), Danish jazz violinist
- 8
  - Rina Matsuno (18), Japanese pop singer (Shiritsu Ebisu Chugaku)
  - Tony Särkkä (44), Swedish black metal multi-instrumentalist
- 11 – Jarmila Šuláková (87), Czech folk singer
- 12
  - Al Jarreau (76), American jazz singer
  - Damian (52), British pop singer
- 13
  - Trish Doan (31), American heavy metal bassist (Kittie) (death announced on this date)
  - E-Dubble (34), American rapper
- 16 – Pericoma Okoye (81), Nigerian traditional music singer
- 17
  - Peter Skellern (69), English easy listening singer-songwriter and pianist
  - Dave Yorko (73), American rock and roll guitarist (Johnny and the Hurricanes)
- 18 – Clyde Stubblefield (73), American funk and soul drummer (James Brown, The J.B.'s)
- 19 – Larry Coryell (73), American jazz fusion guitarist
- 20 – Huang Feili (99), Chinese classical music conductor
- 23
  - Horace Parlan (86), American jazz pianist
  - Leon Ware (77), American funk singer and songwriter
- 25
  - Rick Chavez, American progressive metal singer and guitarist (Drive)
  - Toshio Nakanishi (61), Japanese new wave guitarist (Plastics)
  - Bill Paxton (61), American new wave keyboardist (Martini Ranch) and actor

=== March ===
- 1 – Hiroshi Kamayatsu (78), Japanese rock singer (The Spiders, Vodka Collins)
- 2 – Gata Cattana (26), Spanish rapper
- 3
  - Jim Fuller (69), American surf rock guitarist (The Surfaris)
  - Lyle Ritz (87), American rock bassist and ukuleleist (The Wrecking Crew)
  - Danny Spooner (80), British-born Australian folk singer
- 4
  - Valerie Carter (64), American rock singer and songwriter
  - Edi Fitzroy (61), Jamaican reggae and dancehall singer
  - Tommy Page (46), American pop singer
- 6
  - Ritchie Adams (78), American songwriter and singer (The Fireflies)
  - Lars Diedricson (66), Swedish rock singer (Snowstorm)
  - Alberto Zedda (89), Italian conductor and musicologist
- 7 – Kalika Prasad Bhattacharya (46), Indian folk singer
- 8
  - Dave Valentin (64), American jazz flutist
  - Wordsayer (47), American rapper (Source of Labor)
- 10 – Joni Sledge (60), American R&B and disco singer (Sister Sledge)
- 11
  - Evan Johns (60), American rockabilly guitarist (The LeRoi Brothers)
  - Ángel Parra (73), Chilean folk singer
  - Don Warden (87), American country slide guitarist
- 12 – Joey Alves (63), American hard rock rhythm guitarist (Y&T)
- 13
  - Robert "P-Nut" Johnson, American funk singer (Parliament-Funkadelic)
  - John Lever (55), British post-punk drummer (The Chameleons)
- 15
  - Phil Garland (75), New Zealander folk singer
  - Vicky (69), Colombian pop singer
- 16 – James Cotton (81), American blues harmonica player, singer and songwriter
- 18 – Chuck Berry (90), American rock and roll guitarist, singer and songwriter
- 20
  - Buck Hill (90), American jazz tenor and soprano saxophonist
  - Tony Terran (90), American rock and pop trumpeter (The Wrecking Crew)
- 21 – Gabriel "Negru" Mafa (42), black metal drummer (Negură Bunget)
- 22
  - Sib Hashian (67), American rock drummer (Boston)
  - Sven-Erik Magnusson (74), Swedish pop singer and guitarist (Sven-Ingvars)
- 23 – Sebastián (63), Argentine cuarteto singer
- 24
  - Vincent Falcone (78), American pianist (Frank Sinatra) and conductor
  - Pete Shotton (75), British skiffle percussionist and washboardist (The Quarrymen)
- 25 – Edward Grimes (43), American post-rock drummer (Rachel's)
- 26
  - Alessandro Alessandroni (92), Italian film composer and classical guitarist
  - Jimmy Dotson (83), American blues singer and songwriter
- 27 – Clem Curtis (76), Trinidadian-British singer (The Foundations)
- 28 – Terry Fischer (70), American pop singer (The Murmaids)
- 30 – Rosie Hamlin (71), American pop singer (Rosie and the Originals)

=== April ===
- 1
  - Lonnie Brooks (83), American blues singer and guitarist
  - Ikutaro Kakehashi (87), Japanese engineer, founder of Roland Corporation, manufacturer of electronic musical instruments
  - Wycliffe Noble (91), British gospel singer (The Joystrings) and architect
- 3 – Brenda Jones (62), American singer (The Jones Girls)
- 5 – Paul O'Neill (61), American progressive metal composer, lyricist, producer, and songwriter (Trans-Siberian Orchestra, Savatage)
- 6 – David Peel (74), American folk singer and songwriter
- 7 – Ben Speer (86), American gospel singer (Speer Family)
- 8 – Keni Richards (60), American rock drummer (Autograph)
- 9
  - Alan Henderson (72), Northern Irish rock bassist (Them)
  - Bob Wootton (75), American country guitarist (The Tennessee Three)
- 10 – Banner Thomas (62), American hard rock bassist (Molly Hatchet)
- 11
  - J. Geils (71), American blues, rock and jazz guitarist (The J. Geils Band)
  - Scotty Miller (65), American drummer (Instant Funk)
  - Toby Smith (46), English acid jazz keyboardist, songwriter and producer (Jamiroquai)
- 12 – Barry "Frosty" Smith (71), American rock drummer (Sweathog, Soulhat)
- 14 – Bruce Langhorne (78), American folk singer
- 15
  - Tim Goshorn, 62, American country rock guitarist and singer (Pure Prairie League)
  - Allan Holdsworth (70), British jazz fusion guitarist (Gong, Soft Machine, U.K.)
  - Matt Holt (39), American heavy metal singer (Nothingface)
  - Sylvia Moy (78), American songwriter
- 19 – Dick Contino (87), American accordionist and singer
- 20 – Cuba Gooding Sr. (72), American soul and R&B singer (The Main Ingredient)
- 23 – Jerry Adriani (70), Brazilian rock singer
- 27
  - Jeff Decker, Canadian heavy metal guitarist (Thor)
  - John Shifflett (64), American jazz bassist
- 28 – Joanna Brouk (68), American electronic music composer

=== May ===
- 1
  - Bruce Hampton (70), American rock and jazz fusion singer and guitarist (Hampton Grease Band, Col. Bruce Hampton and the Aquarium Rescue Unit)
  - Erkki Kurenniemi (75), Finnish electronic music composer
- 2 – Kevin Garcia (41), American indie rock bassist (Grandaddy)
- 3
  - Casey Jones (77), American blues drummer (Johnny Winter)
  - C'el Revuelta, American punk rock bassist (Black Flag)
  - Saxa (83), Jamaican ska saxophonist (The Beat)
- 4 – Katy Bødtger (84), Danish singer (Eurovision Song Contest 1960)
- 5 – Clive Brooks (67), British progressive rock drummer (Egg)
- 9
  - Michael Parks (77), American country singer and actor
  - Robert Miles (47), Swiss-born Italian electronic dance record producer, composer and DJ
- 10
  - Bonaldo "Burt" Bonaldi (90), American pop singer (The Gaylords)
  - Pierre DeMudd (64), American trumpeter and singer (Dazz Band)
- 11 – İbrahim Erkal (50), Turkish folk singer
- 12 – Bill Dowdy (84), American jazz drummer (The Three Sounds)
- 13 – Jimmy Copley (63), British rock drummer
- 14 – Keith Mitchell, American dream pop drummer (Mazzy Star)
- 17 – Chris Cornell (52), American alternative rock singer and songwriter (Soundgarden, Audioslave, Temple of the Dog)
- 18 – Frankie Paul (51), Jamaican dancehall singer
- 20
  - Jimmy Dale (81), British-Canadian film and television composer
  - Ace Still, American doom metal singer (Goatlord)
- 21
  - Kenny Cordray (62), American rock guitarist and songwriter
  - Jimmy LaFave (61), American folk singer and songwriter
  - Tulsa Pittaway (42), South African indie rock drummer (Watershed, Evolver One)
- 22
  - Rosa Speer (94), American gospel singer (Speer Family)
  - Zbigniew Wodecki (67), Polish pop singer and violinist
- 25 – Saucy Sylvia (96), Canadian-born American comedy music singer and pianist
- 27
  - Gregg Allman (69), American rock singer, songwriter and keyboardist (The Allman Brothers Band)
  - Guillermo Sanchez, Argentinian heavy metal bassist (Rata Blanca)
- 29 – Arleen Lanzotti (73), American pop singer (The Delicates)
- 31 – Bern Nix (69), American jazz guitarist

=== June ===
- 2 – Aamir Zaki (49), Pakistani psychedelic rock guitarist
- 6
  - Sandra Reemer (66), Dutch pop singer
  - Vin Garbutt (68), British folk singer and songwriter
- 8 – Norro Wilson (79), American country music singer, songwriter and record producer
- 11 – Rosalie Sorrels (83), American folk singer and songwriter
- 12 – Geri Allen (60), American jazz pianist
- 16 – Eliza Clívia (37), Brazilian forro singer
- 17 – Thara Memory (68), American jazz trumpeter
- 18 – Chris Murrell (60), American gospel and jazz singer
- 20
  - Prodigy (42), American rapper (Mobb Deep)
  - Bo Wagner (72), American marimba player (Starbuck)
- 21 – Belton Richard (77), American Cajun accordionist
- 22 – Jimmy Nalls (66), American blues rock guitarist (Sea Level)
- 25 – Dave Evans (66), American bluegrass singer and banjoist
- 28
  - Gary DeCarlo (75), American pop singer and songwriter (Steam)
  - Nic Ritter (37), American thrash metal drummer (Warbringer)
  - Dave Rosser (50), American alternative rock guitarist (The Afghan Whigs)
- 30 – Don Rea (88), American pop singer (The Gaylords)

=== July ===
- 3 – Rudy Rotta (66), Italian blues rock guitarist
- 4 – John Blackwell, Jr. (43), American funk and R&B drummer (D'Angelo, The New Power Generation)
- 5 – Pierre Henry (89), French musique concrète composer
- 6
  - Mick Bund, British post-punk bassist (Felt)
  - Melvyn "Deacon" Jones (73), American soul keyboardist (Baby Huey & the Babysitters)
- 9 – Erik Cartwright (66), American blues rock guitarist (Foghat)
- 12
  - Marc 'Blaash' Michaelson, American black metal drummer (Bahimiron)
  - Tamara Miansarova (86), Russian pop singer
  - Ray Phiri (70), South African jazz fusion singer and guitarist
- 13
  - Simon Holmes (54), Australian jangle pop guitarist (The Hummingbirds)
  - Egil Kapstad (76), Norwegian jazz pianist and composer
  - Chris Wong Won (53), American rapper (2 Live Crew)
- 14
  - Mahi Beamer (88), American-Native Hawaiian folk singer and pianist
  - David Zablidowsky (38), American hard rock bassist (Adrenaline Mob, Trans-Siberian Orchestra)
- 16 – Wilfried (67), Austrian pop singer
- 17 – Peter Principle (63), American post-punk bassist (Tuxedomoon)
- 18 – José Bragato (101), Italian-born Argentine cellist, composer, conductor and arranger
- 19
  - Barbara Weldens (35), French pop singer and songwriter
  - Graham Wood (45), Australian jazz pianist
- 20
  - Chester Bennington (41), American hard rock singer and songwriter (Linkin Park, Stone Temple Pilots, Dead by Sunrise)
  - Andrea Jürgens (50), German schlager singer
- 21
  - Errol Dyers (65), South African jazz guitarist
  - Geoff Mack (94), Australian country singer and songwriter
  - Kenny Shields (69), Canadian hard rock singer (Streetheart)
  - Paapa Yankson (73), Ghanaian highlife singer
- 22
  - Polo Hofer (72), Swiss pop singer
  - Bobby Taylor (83), American soul singer (Bobby Taylor & the Vancouvers)
- 25
  - Michael Johnson (72), American country singer and songwriter
  - Geoffrey Gurrumul Yunupingu (46), Indigenous Australian folk singer and guitarist
- 27 – Billy Joe Walker Jr. (64), American country music record producer
- 28 – D.L. Menard (85), American Cajun music singer
- 31 – Chuck Loeb (61), American jazz guitarist (Fourplay)

=== August ===
- 1 – Goldy McJohn (72), Canadian hard rock keyboardist (Steppenwolf)
- 2 – Daniel Licht (60), American film and television composer
- 4
  - Luiz Melodia (66), Brazilian MPB singer
  - Joe Romano (67), American bassist (The Fun and Games)
- 8
  - Glen Campbell (81), American country music singer and songwriter
  - Pavel Slobodkin (73), Russian composer, pianist, founder of Vesyolye Rebyata
- 11 – Segun Bucknor (71), Nigerian soul and funk keyboardist and guitarist
- 19 – Bea Wain (100), American big band singer (Larry Clinton and His Orchestra)
- 20 – Jerry Lewis (91), American actor and pop singer
- 21 – Sonny Burgess (88), American rockabilly singer
- 22 – John Abercrombie (73), American jazz fusion guitarist
- 24
  - Pete Kuykendall (79), American bluegrass banjoist
  - Larry Marshall (75), Jamaican reggae singer
- 26 – Wilson das Neves (81), Brazilian bossa nova singer and percussionist
- 28 – Melissa Bell (53), British R&B and soul singer (Soul II Soul)
- 29 – Larry Elgart (95), American jazz bandleader and alto saxophonist
- 30 – Skip Prokop (73), Canadian rock and jazz fusion drummer (Lighthouse, The Paupers)

=== September ===
- 1 – Mick Softley (77), British folk singer and songwriter
- 2 – Dave Hlubek (66), American rock guitarist and songwriter (Molly Hatchet)
- 3 – Walter Becker (67), American jazz rock guitarist, bassist and songwriter (Steely Dan)
- 4 – Earl Lindo (64), Jamaican reggae keyboardist (Bob Marley and the Wailers)
- 5 – Rick Stevens (77), American R&B singer (Tower of Power)
- 6 – Holger Czukay (79), German experimental rock bassist (Can)
- 8
  - Troy Gentry (50), American country singer (Montgomery Gentry)
  - Don Williams (78), American country singer
- 11 – Virgil Howe (41), British alternative rock drummer (Little Barrie)
- 12
  - Riem de Wolff (74), Dutch-Indonesian rock and roll singer (The Blue Diamonds)
  - Josh Schwartz (45), American alternative country guitarist (Beachwood Sparks)
  - Jessi Zazu (28), American garage rock singer and songwriter (Those Darlins)
- 13 – Grant Hart (56), American alternative rock singer, songwriter and drummer (Hüsker Dü)
- 17 – Laudir de Oliveira (77), Brazilian rock and jazz percussionist (Chicago)
- 18 – Mark Selby (56), American blues rock singer and guitarist
- 21 – Cees Bergman (65), Dutch glam rock singer (Catapult)
- 22
  - Ammon Tharp (75), American soul singer and drummer (Bill Deal and the Rhondels)
  - Eric Eycke (41), American heavy metal singer (Corrosion of Conformity)
- 23 – Charles Bradley (68), American soul singer
- 27
  - CeDell Davis (91), American blues guitarist
  - Joy Fleming (72), German pop singer
  - Hiromi Hayakawa (34), Japanese-born Mexican pop singer
- 30 – Tom Paley (89), American folk guitarist and banjoist (New Lost City Ramblers)

=== October ===
- 2 – Tom Petty (66), American rock singer, songwriter and guitarist (Tom Petty and the Heartbreakers, Traveling Wilburys, Mudcrutch)
- 4 – Janis Hansen (74), American pop and bossa nova singer (Sérgio Mendes & Brasil '66, The Carnival)
- 5
  - Alvin DeGuzman, American post-hardcore guitarist (The Icarus Line)
  - Rodrigo BVevino (42), British heavy metal singer (Avenger)
- 6 – Bunny Sigler (76), American soul singer, songwriter and record producer
- 7 – Jimmy Beaumont (76), American doo-wop singer (The Skyliners)
- 8 – Grady Tate (85), American jazz drummer and singer
- 16
  - Augustin Mawangu Mingiedi (56), Congolese afro-pop lkembist (Konono Nº1)
  - Iain Shedden (60), Australian punk rock drummer (The Saints)
- 17
  - Gord Downie (53), Canadian rock singer and songwriter (The Tragically Hip)
- 18 – Eamonn Campbell (70), Irish folk singer and guitarist (The Dubliners)
- 21 – Martin Eric Ain (50), American-Swiss heavy metal bassist (Celtic Frost)
- 22
  - Al Hurricane (81), American folk singer and songwriter
  - Scott Putesky (49), American heavy metal guitarist (Marilyn Manson)
  - George Young (70), British-born Australian rock guitarist and songwriter (The Easybeats, Flash and the Pan)
- 24
  - Fats Domino (89), American rock and roll singer and pianist
  - Larry Ray (63), American power pop guitarist (Outrageous Cherry)
- 27
  - Mike Hudson (61), American punk rock singer (The Pagans)
  - Dick Noel (90), American big band singer
- 28
  - Bruce Black, American power metal drummer (Meliah Rage)
  - Daichi Shimoda, Japanese deathcore vocalist (Victim of Deception)
- 29
  - Muhal Richard Abrams (87), American free jazz pianist
  - Billy Mize (88), American country singer and steel guitarist
  - Keith Wilder (65), American funk singer (Heatwave)

=== November ===
- 1
  - Katie Lee (98), American folk singer
  - Scott Wily, American death metal singer (Vital Remains)
- 2 – María Martha Serra Lima (72), Argentinean bolero singer
- 3
  - Gaetano Bardini (91), Italian opera singer
  - Naomi Sego (86), American gospel singer (The Sego Brothers and Naomi)
- 5
  - Robert Knight (72), American soul singer
  - Louis Roney (96), American opera tenor
- 7
  - Paul Buckmaster (71), British rock and orchestral arranger and conductor
  - Robert De Cormier (95), American folk arranger
  - Pentti Glan (71), Finnish rock drummer (Mandala, Lou Reed, Alice Cooper)
- 9 – Fred Cole (69), American garage rock singer and guitarist (The Lollipop Shoppe, Dead Moon)
- 10 – Chuck Mosley (57), American alternative rock singer (Faith No More)
- 11 – Chiquito de la Calzada (85), Spanish flamenco singer
- 12 – Chad Hanks (46), American metal bassist (American Head Charge)
- 15
  - Bonnie Flower (63), American sunshine pop singer (Wendy and Bonnie)
  - Lil Peep (21), American rapper
- 16 – Michael "Dik Mik" Davies (73), British space rock keyboardist (Hawkwind)
- 17 – Rikard Wolff (59), Finnish pop singer and actor
- 18
  - Ben Riley (84), American jazz drummer
  - Malcolm Young (64), Australian hard rock guitarist (AC/DC)
- 19
  - Ronnie Butler (80), Bahamanian calypso singer
  - Warren "Pete" Moore (79), American R&B singer (The Miracles)
  - Della Reese (86), American gospel singer
  - Mel Tillis (85), American country singer
- 20 – Laila Sari (82), Indonesian children's music singer
- 21
  - David Cassidy (67), American pop singer and actor
  - Wayne Cochran (78), American soul singer and songwriter
- 22 – Tommy Keene (59), American power pop singer and songwriter
- 23
  - John Coates Jr. (79), American jazz pianist
  - Jon Hendricks (96), American jazz singer
  - Dmitri Hvorostovsky (55), Russian opera singer
- 24
  - Mitch Margo (70), American doo-wop singer and songwriter (The Tokens)
  - Clotilde Rosa (87), Portuguese classical harpist
  - Bari Siddiqui (63), Bangladeshi folk singer and flautist
- 26 – Patrick Bourgeois (54), Canadian rock singer and guitarist (Les B.B.)
- 27 – Robert Popwell (66), American rock and jazz bassist (The Young Rascals, The Crusaders)
- 28 – Shadia (86), Egyptian pop singer
- 29 – Robert Walker (80), American blues guitarist
- 30
  - Jim Nabors (87), American actor and singer
  - Zé Pedro (61), Portuguese new wave guitarist (Xutos & Pontapés)

=== December ===
- 2
  - Norihiko Hashida (72), Japanese folk singer and songwriter (The Folk Crusaders)
  - Mundell Lowe (95), American jazz guitarist
- 5 – Johnny Hallyday (74), French rock singer
- 7 – Sunny Murray (81), American free jazz drummer
- 8 – Gloria Ann Taylor (73), American soul singer
- 12
  - Pat DiNizio (62), American power pop singer and guitarist (The Smithereens)
  - Willie Pickens (86), American jazz pianist
- 13
  - Dave Christenson (54), American new wave singer (Stabilizers)
  - Warrel Dane (56), American heavy metal singer (Sanctuary, Nevermore)
  - Rory O'Donoghue (68), Australian rock and pop guitarist
- 16
  - Ralph Carney (61), American rock and jazz saxophonist and clarinetist (Tin Huey)
  - Richard Dobson (75), American country singer and songwriter
  - Michael Prophet (60), Jamaican reggae singer
  - Keely Smith (89), American jazz singer
- 17 – Kevin Mahogany (59), American jazz singer
- 18 – Kim Jong-hyun (27), South Korean K-pop singer and songwriter (Shinee)
- 19
  - Jim Forrester (43), American hard rock bassist (Sixty Watt Shaman)
  - Leo Welch (85), American gospel blues singer and guitarist
- 21
  - Roswell Rudd (82), American free jazz trombonist
  - Marilyn Tyler (91), American opera singer
- 22 – Pam the Funkstress, American hip hop DJ (The Coup)
- 25 – Nao (56), Japanese heavy metal vocalist (United)
- 28
  - Rose Marie (94), American actress, singer and comedienne
  - Curly Seckler (98), American bluegrass guitarist and mandolinist (Foggy Mountain Boys, Nashville Grass)
- 31 – Maurice Peress (87), American conductor and music educator

== Musical films ==
- What We Started

== See also ==
- Timeline of musical events
- Women in music
