= 2017 in European music =

2017 in continental European music in geographical order.

== Events ==
- 11 January – Elbphilharmonie in Hamburg, Germany, is opened with a concert by the NDR Elbphilharmonie Orchestra, the NDR Chor and conductor Thomas Hengelbrock.
- 13 May – Final of the Eurovision Song Contest 2017 takes place in Kyiv, Ukraine. It is won for the first time by Portugal, represented by Salvador Sobral with the song "Amar pelos dois".
- 8 September – Eurovision winner Salvador Sobral gives a farewell concert, prior to being admitted to hospital in the hope of receiving a heart transplant.

== Scandinavia ==
- Main article for Scandinavian music in 2017

=== Top hits ===
- Danish #1s
- Finnish #1 singles 2017, Finnish #1 albums
- Norway charts
- Swedish #1 singles and albums

== Netherlands ==
Dutch #1 singles

== Ireland ==
- Main article for Irish music in 2017

== UK ==
- Main article for British music in 2017

== Germany ==
- German number ones

== Switzerland and Austria ==
- Swiss #1s

== France ==
- French #1s

== Italy ==
- Italian number ones

== Eastern Europe/ Balkans ==
- List of Polish #1 singles
- Czech #1 singles
- Hungarian #1 singles

== Musical films ==
- Love and Bullets (Italy)
- Dalida (France)
- Jeannette: The Childhood of Joan of Arc (France)

== Deaths ==
- 4 January – Georges Prêtre, 92, French orchestral and opera conductor
- 13 January
  - Anton Nanut, 84, Slovenian conductor
  - Jan Stoeckart, 89, Dutch composer, conductor and trombonist
- 16 January – Gerd Grochowski, 60, German opera singer
- 18 January – Ståle Wikshåland, 63, Norwegian musicologist (blood clot)
- 20 January – Frank Thomas, 80, French songwriter.
- 21 January – Veljo Tormis, 86, Estonian composer
- 22 January
  - Jean Georgakarakos (Karakos), 76, French music producer
  - Jaki Liebezeit, 78, German drummer (Can)
- 27 January – Henry-Louis de La Grange, 92, French musicologist, biographer of Gustav Mahler
- 28 January – Alexander Tikhanovich, 64, Belarusian pop singer (Verasy).
- 31 January
  - Deke Leonard, 72, Welsh rock guitarist (Man)
  - John Wetton, 67, British bassist (cancer)
- 7 February
  - Svend Asmussen, 100, Danish jazz violinist
  - Loukianos Kilaidonis, 73, Greek singer-songwriter
- 8 February – Tony Särkkä, 44, Swedish multi-instrumentalist (Abruptum, Ophthalamia)
- 11 February – Jarmila Šuláková, 87, Czech folk singer.
- 17 February – Peter Skellern, 69, English singer-songwriter (brain tumour)
- 21 February – Enzo Carella, 65, Italian singer-songwriter
- 27 February
  - Jórunn Viðar, 98, Icelandic pianist and composer
  - Eva Maria Zuk, 71, Polish-born Mexican pianist
- 3 March – Misha Mengelberg, 81, Ukrainian-born Dutch jazz pianist and composer
- 5 March – Kurt Moll, 78, German opera singer
- 6 March – Alberto Zedda, 89, Italian conductor and musicologist
- 9 March – Barbara Helsingius, 79, Finnish singer, poet and Olympic fencer
- 9 April – Stan Robinson, 80, British jazz tenor saxophonist and flautist
- 18 April – Frank Dostal, 71, German music producer and songwriter
- 19 April – Pat Fitzpatrick, 60, Irish keyboardist (cancer)
- 27 April – Eduard Brunner, 77, Swiss clarinetist
- 1 May – Erkki Kurenniemi, 75, Finnish musician
- 2 May – Péter Komlós, 81, Hungarian violinist
- 8 May – Mary Tsoni, 30, Greek actress and singer (Dogtooth)
- 9 May – Robert Miles, 47, Italian electronic dance musician and record producer
- 22 May – Zbigniew Wodecki, 67, Polish singer, composer and musician
- 6 June – Sandra Reemer, 66, Dutch singer (breast cancer)
- 11 June – Corneliu Stroe, Romanian jazz drummer and percussionist, 67 (heart attack)
- 22 June – Gunter Gabriel, 75, German singer, musician and composer
- 2 July – Chris Roberts, 73, German schlager singer (cancer)
- 3 July – Rudy Rotta, 66, Italian blues guitarist and singer
- 5 July – Pierre Henry, 89, French composer
- 9 July – Paquita Rico, 87, Spanish singer and actress
- 13 July
  - Giannis Kalatzis, 74, Greek singer
  - Egil Kapstad, 76, Norwegian jazz pianist, arranger and composer
- 19 July – Barbara Weldens, 35, French singer (electrocuted on stage)
- 20 July – Andrea Jürgens, 50, German schlager singer (kidney failure)
- 23 July – Thomas Füri, 70, Swiss violinist (I Salonisti)
- 26 July – Paul Angerer, 90, Austrian conductor, violist, composer, and radio presenter
- 8 August – Pēteris Plakidis, 70, Latvian composer and pianist
- 9 August – Marián Varga, 70, Slovak organist and composer
- 20 August
  - Margot Hielscher, 97, German singer and film actress
  - Wilhelm Killmayer, 89, German composer, conductor, and lecturer
  - Nati Mistral, 88, Spanish actress and singer
- 24 August – Aloys Kontarsky, 86, German pianist
- 25 August – Enzo Dara, Italian opera singer, 78
- 27 September – Joy Fleming, 72, German singer
- 2 October – Klaus Huber, 92, Swiss composer and academic
- 8 October – László Aradszky, 82, Hungarian pop singer
- 3 November
  - Gaetano Bardini, 91, Italian opera singer
  - Václav Riedlbauch, 70, Czech composer, pedagogue and manager, Minister of Culture (2009–2010)
- 9 November – Hans Vermeulen, 70, Dutch singer and musician, winner of Golden Harp
- 12 November – Michel Chapuis, 87, French classical organist and pedagogue
- 24 November – Clotilde Rosa, 87, Portuguese harpist, teacher and composer7
- 30 November – Zé Pedro, 61, Portuguese guitarist
