= 2017 in Asian music =

== Events ==
- January 11 – It is announced that Lan Shui will stand down as music director of the Singapore Symphony Orchestra in January 2019.
- January 22 – The Shanghai Symphony Orchestra, the Guangzhou Symphony Orchestra, and the China Philharmonic Orchestra all announce the cancellation of scheduled concert appearances with Korean soprano Sumi Jo, without formal explanation. It is suggested by some that political tensions between the South Korean and Chinese governments have caused the cancellation of concerts by Sumi Jo and other Korean performers.
- April 10 – Du Yun is awarded the 2017 Pulitzer Prize for Music for her composition, Angel's Bone.
- September 30 – Tan Dun is awarded the Golden Lion for Lifetime Achievement at the Venice Biennale.

== Albums ==
- Band-Maid – Just Bring It
- E-girls – E.G. Crazy
- Hello Venus – Mystery of Venus
- Koda Kumi – W Face: Inside/Outside
- Mito Natsume – Natsumelo
- Anupam Roy – Ebar Morle Gachh Hawbo
- Regine Velasquez – R3.0
- Navneet Aditya Waiba – Ama Lai Shraddhanjali
- Sachin Warrier – Kanave Kalayathe

== Classical ==
- Sofia Gubaidulina – Triple Concerto for Violin, Cello, and Bayan

== Opera ==
- Sukanya, with music by Ravi Shankar and libretto by Amit Chaudhuri

== Musical films ==
- Alamara
- Anaarkali of Aarah
- Arjunan Kadhali
- Dr. Nawariyan (Sri Lanka), with music by Dinesh Subasinghe
- Duvvada Jagannadham
- Love Is a Broadway Hit
- Our Shining Days (China), starring Xu Lu and Peng Yuchang

== Deaths ==
- January 2 – Barbara Fei, 85, Hong Kong opera singer.
- January 14 – Yama Buddha, 29, Nepalese rapper
- February 8 – Rina Matsuno, 18, Japanese pop singer (lethal arrhythmia)
- February 25 – Toshio Nakanishi, musician and producer, 61 (esophageal cancer)
- March 1
  - Raajesh Johri, Indian singer-songwriter, 64
  - Hiroshi Kamayatsu, Japanese singer and guitarist, 78
- March 7 – Kalika Prasad Bhattacharya, 47, Indian folk singer and researcher
- April 12 – Peggy Hayama, Japanese singer, 83
- May 20 – Natalia Shakhovskaya, 81, Russian cellist
- May 21 – Leo Kristi, Indonesian singer, 67 (kidney failure)
- July 8 – Seiji Yokoyama, Japanese composer, 82
- August 30 – Abdul Jabbar, 78, Bangladeshi singer
- December 2 – Norihiko Hashida, Japanese folk singer-songwriter, 72
- December 18 – Kim Jong-hyun, 27, South Korean singer-songwriter and radio host (carbon monoxide poisoning)

== See also ==
- 2017 in music
- 2017 in Japanese music
