= Allegiance (Australian band) =

Australian thrash metal band

- Origin: Perth, Western Australia, Australia
- Genre: Thrash metal
- Years active: 1990–1997; 2000; 2003; 2004
- Labels: Id/PolyGram; Mercury
- Member of: Black Steel
- Past members: Tony Campo; Dave Harrison; Conrad Higson; John Mihos; Dave Barry; Jason Stone; Glenn Butcher

Allegiance were an Australian thrash metal band. They formed in 1990 in Perth and disbanded in 1997. They released two studio albums, D.e.s.t.i.t.u.t.i.o.n (1994) and Skinman (1996). Australian musicologist Ian McFarlane said they "gained international acclaim and interest from several key figures in the heavy metal world. [Their] tight sound mixed the heavy riffs and complexities of San Francisco Bay Area thrash bands like Metallica, Testament, Slayer and Exodus with a touch of Sepultura."

== History ==
=== 1990–94: Formation and early EPs ===
Allegiance was formed in Perth in 1990 as a thrash metal group by Tony Campo on guitar, Dave Harrison on bass guitar, Steve Hidden on guitar, Conrad Higson on drums and John Mihos on lead vocals. After a few months of performing Mihos left and Higson switched to lead vocals, Glenn Butcher replaced Dave Barry on drums and Jason Stone replaced Hidden on guitar.

In 1991 the group recorded a four-track extended play, Make the Pledge, as a music cassette, which was self-funded: with $250 from their live shows. It was released in October, its straight forward thrash metal sound helped it to sell 2000 copies. In the next month Allegiance won the Most Popular Band category at the West Australian Music Industry Awards (WAMI Awards) for that year.

In February 1992 Allegiance played at the annual Bindoon Rock outdoor concert festival for the first time to a crowd of 10 000 people. In March they released their second EP, Torn Between Two Worlds, on a seven-track cassette. Andrew Masterton in the Age's EG writes of this tape "they show a remarkable ability to handle speed metal riffs and power chords at breakneck pace in wrist-straining arrangements." The recording featured improved production and song writing, which demonstrated the band's progress. The EP sold 3500 copies, won the 1992 local industry award for most popular WA cassette. It was praised as one of the most impressive tapes of 1992 by magazines, fanzines and radio shows in places like Japan, Argentina, Poland, Greece, Cyprus, Lithuania, Germany, Canada, United States and the United Kingdom.

In July 1992 Allegiance won the state final of the Yamaha Rock competition and flew to Melbourne to represent their state in the national final, where they received the Juke Magazine-sponsored Encouragement Award. They competed against seven other unsigned acts; the final was broadcast nationally on MTV. The band headed to ABC studios in August 1992 to record five tracks live-in-the-studio: in one take with few overdubs. These were released as their third EP in October, Studio Live. It was limited to 500 copies, which sold out in one day and became a sought-after collector's item.

In September 1992 the group performed at the Australian Metalfest at the Hordern Pavilion, Sydney and provided the track, "Twisted Minds", for a CD sampler. Reviews stated Allegiance to be the most impressive bands on the bill which helped to establish their reputation as a live act outside their home state.

At the end of the year, some of their tracks were selected for inclusion on the Def Records Australia Metal compilation and local talent showcase, The Western Front, compilation CDs. Allegiance was voted the ninth best Australian band and fifth best new band in Hot Metal Magazine's annual readers poll. The band again ended the year by winning the Most Popular Band category at the 1992 WAMI Awards.

In 1993 Allegiance continued touring including a second appearance at the annual, Bindoon Rock festival, performing in front of 15,000 people at the national Big Day Out festival as well as touring nationally supporting Kreator and Fear Factory which furthered their reputation as a thrash metal band. Allegiance had tracks included on the Roadrunner records Australasian compilation RedRum and Studio 52's While My Guitar Gently Kills Your Mother and Polygram heavy metal promotional cassette. Ex-Judas Priest frontman, Rob Halford, took an interest in the band. He made statements in the international metal press claiming Allegiance to be a dynamite band. His company, Entertainment Management Advisory Services (EMAS), were managing the band to increase international exposure.

=== 1994–97: From D.e.s.t.i.t.u.t.i.o.n to Skinman ===
In March 1994 Allegiance toured nationally with Halford's new band, Fight. Allegiance placed in ten different categories in the HM Magazine readers' poll, including tenth best band of all time. In April the group secured a deal with the ID Phonogram label. Their debut album, D.e.s.t.i.t.u.t.i.o.n, was recorded in Australia by American producer, Dave Pinsky. They had met Pinsky whilst supporting the Beastie Boys with whom he was working. The album was mastered in the Netherlands by Attie Bauw who has worked with both Fight and Judas Priest.

In May D.e.s.t.i.t.u.t.i.o.n was released and although it received no mainstream radio or video exposure, it went straight into the W.A. mainstream ARIA chart at No. 1 and remained in the top 5 for 3 weeks. The band continued touring with their own headlining Destitution Tour across state capitals and then touring nationally with Australian hard rock band, The Poor. The D.e.s.t.i.t.u.t.i.o.n album topped local metal charts in the country and has been one of the best-selling, homegrown, hard music releases in many years.

In July Allegiance appeared on the cover of HM magazine. D.e.s.t.i.t.u.t.i.o.n started to receive positive reviews in the overseas metal press including a rating of KKKK by UK publication, Kerrang!. They shot two music videos which aired on several music video programs. In November the band recorded Time To React – Live!, a special live recording at the ABC's JJJ studios to an audience of die hard Allegiance fans. It contains no overdubs and shows the uncompromising raw power of the band in the live environment. 1995 was a busy year for Allegiance with the release of Time To React – Live! and touring big names such as Slayer, Biohazard, Machine Head and Channel Zero. They also appeared at the Big Day Out concert festivals in both Australia and New Zealand. At this stage, Allegiance were the undisputed biggest metal band in the country. In 1996 the band started work on their next album, Skinman. The album title was inspired by the tragic suicide of a member of Allegiance's road crew whose nickname was "Skinman". It was recorded in Western Australia on 48 track digital and was produced by John Villani who handled their debut. The album showed a progression in Allegiance's sound but still retaining raw power that made them popular in the first place. It was released in November through the Mercury label and debuted on the ARIA charts at No. 11. In 1997 the band was continuing to tour, playing shows and festivals with many big-name international bands. However, tension between band members began to arise and while shooting a video for the track "Give Yourself" from the Skinman album in late '97, Dave Harrison left the group and Allegiance disbanded soon after. Dave went on to form the traditional / power metal band Black Steel and later became the founder and CEO of the online music merchandise company Heavy Metal Merchant.

In 2016 EVP Recordings reissued the D.e.s.t.i.t.u.t.i.o.n. album on streaming platforms and as a deluxe CD/DVD media book and limited edition vinyl pressing.

=== Post break-up ===
Fans were not happy with the break-up of the band so the legacy of Allegiance continues on to this day. In November 2000, Allegiance did a massive "one-off" reunion concert in Perth and showed that the band's popularity had not dipped over the years. In 2003 Allegiance returned with another re-union for the 'NYE Kikstart' concert and were also inducted into the Western Australian music hall of fame. Allegiance re-united again in 2004 to play with Kiss at the WACA and again in 2021.

== Discography ==
=== Studio albums ===
List of albums, with Australian chart positions
Title	Album details	Peak chart positions
Title	Album details	AUS
D.e.s.t.i.t.u.t.i.o.n	Released:May 1994; Format: CD; Label: Polygram, ID Phonogram (id00172)	87
Skinman	Released: 1996; Format: CD; Label: Mercury (5343682)	-

=== Live albums ===
List of live albums, with Australian chart positions
Title	Album details	Peak chart positions
Title	Album details	AUS
Time to React – Live!	Released: 1995; Format: CD; Label: Allegiance	-

=== Extended plays ===
- Make the Pledge (October 1991) independent
- Torn Between Two Worlds (March 1992) independent
- Studio Live (October 1992) independent
