= Sadiki =

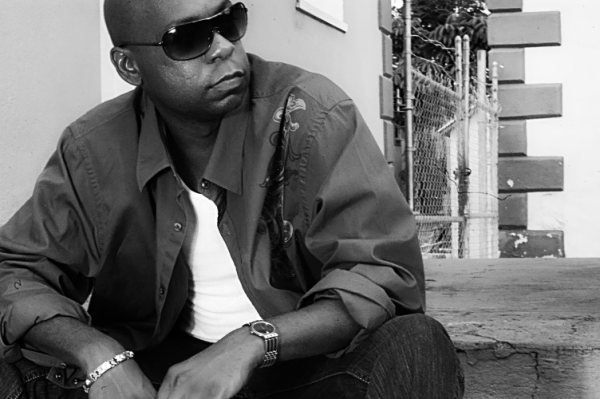
- Sadiki in June 2010

Background information
- Born: Henry Buckley Jr. 17 November 1971 (age 54)
- Origin: Jamaica
- Genres: Reggae
- Occupations: Singer, songwriter, record producer, recording engineer
- Instruments: Vocals, keyboard
- Years active: 1997–present
- Labels: Skinny Bwoy (CEO, 2004–present); Scratchie (former); Mercury (former)
- Website: www.iamsadiki.com

Henry Buckley Jr. aka Sadiki previously known as Pancho Kryztal (born 17 November 1971, Kingston, Jamaica), is a Jamaican-American singer, songwriter and producer.

== Early life ==
He was born Henry Buckley Jr., in Rollington Town, Kingston, Jamaica. With a father, Henry Buckley, who was a singer-songwriter and the Music Director/Conductor for the Jamaica Constabulary Force Band, Sadiki was given no choice as to the career path that would later choose him. He migrated to the United States in the late '80s and settled on Chicago's northside. As part of Chicago's sizeable Jamaican community he was exposed to the newest reggae sounds coming out of Jamaica as well as the cutting edge of hip-hop, R&B and everything in between. Through these influences Sadiki has developed the vocal range and lyrical skills that brings together the best of both worlds. In the late '90s he landed a deal with the D'arcy Wretzky (Smashing Pumpkins) and Adam Schlesinger (Fountains of Wayne/Ivy) owned label Scratchie Records, (distributed by Mercury Records). In 1997 his self-titled debut was released on Scratchie/Mercury under the name Pancho Kryztal, to good reviews but disappointing sales as Mercury Records went through a change in its corporate structure.

== Music career ==
Unfazed by the lack of commercial success on his first major release, he returned to Jamaica in 1998 and recorded "Rescue Me" on the Bookshelf riddim with dancehall producer Tony "CD" Kelly (Sean Paul, Lady Saw, Mr. Vegas, Super Cat). In 1999, at the suggestion of reggae producer "Computer" Paul Henton (Shabba Ranks, Beres Hammond, Shaggy, Jimmy Cliff), he changed his name to Sadiki – an Egyptian name meaning "faithful or loyal" (misspelled Sadeki on some earlier releases). During this trip, he recorded the catchy dancehall song "Love How Yuh Tan" on the Whoo riddim (K-Licious Records). Sadiki again returned to Jamaica in 2001 where he scored a major dancehall hit with "Gal Dem Everytime" on the Buyout riddim for reggae producer Tony "CD" Kelly. He also recorded "Tribute" on the Smile riddim and "Sure" on the No Vacancy riddim for Henton's Boot Camp Records. During that year, Sadiki met reggae singer-songwriter Beres Hammond. He was asked to add his vocals to a track at Hammond's Silekshan Studio. Within a few months of working alongside Hammond, Sadiki was selected as one of the opening acts for the elder musicians' Music is Life World Tour 2002. On tour with Hammond for almost two years, Sadiki performed throughout the US, Japan and the Caribbean. Taking the lessons he had learned on the road with Hammond, he returned to Jamaica where he started work on his debut album.

As well as being his singing and songwriting debut (under the name Sadiki), the album Morning's Come was also Sadiki's producing and engineering debut, as he produced or co-produced each and every track. Morning's Come also featured production from top reggae veteran producer Lloyd Campbell of Joe Fraser Records (Glen Washington, Freddie McGregor, Marcia Griffiths, Tarrus Riley), England's top reggae producer Chris Peckings (Bitty McLean, Gappy Ranks), Delly Ranx (Sean Paul, Mavado) and Arif Cooper (Guardian Angel riddim). In March 2007, Sadiki did a four-city tour of Japan. After this successful tour, he was offered a licensing deal in Japan. "Morning's Come" was released in Japan in November 2007 (Skinny Bwoy/P-Vine Records). Within weeks of its Japan release, the album hit the No. 1 spot for reggae releases at HMV stores throughout Japan, and charted within the top 5 for sales in Tower Records stores. The US version of Morning's Come, featuring new and unreleased tracks, was released worldwide in the Fall of 2008.

In the summer of 2009, Sadiki started work on two albums. The first album – Lifeline is a collaborative effort teaming Sadiki with veteran producer Lloyd Campbell and Jason Sterling of Joe Fraser Records. For 2010, the first single – "African Queen", was released on vinyl in limited quantities. Lifeline was released in the Fall of 2010. In 2011 the album Fi Di Dancehall (a collaborative effort with DJ Delly Ranks) was released. In 2012 Sadiki became a member of the Legendary Rock Steady group The Tennors and also released two albums – Sadiki Meets Sandra Cross (UK Version) and his third solo album Jah Is The Only King. In 2016 Sadiki released his fourth studio album Covered in Love. His fifth album Blue Mountain Acoustic will be released on 1 June 2018.

Through his travels Sadiki has shared the stage with Buju Banton, Gyptian, Shaggy, Wayne Wonder, Maxi Priest, Marcia Griffiths, K-Ci & JoJo, Beenie Man, Gerald Levert, Kelly Price among others.

== Discography ==
=== Albums ===
- 1997: Pancho Kryztal (Scratchie/Mercury Records)
- 2007: Morning's Come Japan Release (Skinny Bwoy/P-Vine Records-JPN)
- 2008: True Singers: Sadiki Meets Sandra Cross (Skinny Bwoy/P-Vine Records-JPN)
- 2008: Morning's Come US Release (Skinny Bwoy Records)
- 2010: Lifeline (Skinny Bwoy/Joe Fraser Records) ***#1 Weekly Star Top 10 Chart*** No. 2 South Florida Reggae Album Charts / No. 2 New York Reggae Album Charts
- 2011: Fi Di Dancehall (Collaborative album with DJ Delly Ranx) (Pure Music/Skinny Bwoy Records)
- 2012: True Singers: Sadiki Meets Sandra Cross (UK) (Skinny Bwoy Jamaica)
- 2012: Jah Is The Only King (Skinny Bwoy Jamaica)
- 2016: Covered in Love (Skinny Bwoy Records)

=== Compilations ===
- 1996: Jamdown Vibrations – "Black Girl" (Scratchie Records)
- 1997: Culture Vibes – "I Hear You Calling" (Scratchie Records)
- 1998: Riddim Driven: Bookshelf Riddim – "Rescue Me" (VP Records)
- 1999: Whoo Riddim – "Love How Yuh Tan" (K-Licious Records/VP Records)
- 2001: Riddim Driven: Buyout Riddim – "Gal Dem Everytime" (VP Records)
- 2006: Loving Pauper Meets Hypocrites – "Innocent or Guilty" (Joe Fraser Records)
- 2006: Riddim Driven: Red Bull & Guinness The Mixture – "No Boring Ride" (VP Records)
- 2008: Love Tune 4 – "One Touch" (Avex Records-JPN)
- 2010: Expressions of Love – "Makeup Sex" (Joe Fraser/VP Records)

=== Singles ===
- 1998: "Lethal Weapon w/Mad Cobra" (Shocking Vibes)
- 2001: "Opportunity" (Harmony House Records)
- 2001: "Tribute" (Boot Camp Records)
- 2005: "Pretty Girl" (Skinny Bwoy Records) Peaked at No. 16 – NY Top 20 singles Reggae Chart
- 2006: "No Boring Ride" (Pure Music)
- 2007: "Slipping Away" (Peckings Records)
- 2007: "Wouldn't Stay Away" (Peckings Records)
- 2007: "Perfect Love" (Joe Fraser Records) Peaked at No. 11 – NY Top 20 Reggae Chart / No. 14 Florida Top 30 Reggae singles Chart
- 2007: "Lost Without You" (Joe Fraser Records) Peaked at No. 2 – South Florida Reggae singles Chart / No. 4 NY Top 20 Reggae singles Chart
- 2007: "Mary's Story"/Girlfriend feat. Delly Ranks (Skinny Bwoy/P-Vine Records) – Japan Release
- 2008: "Staadap Staadie"/"Incomplete (Sadiki Remix)" (Skinny Bwoy/P-Vine Records) – Japan Release
- 2010: "African Queen" (Joe Fraser/VP Records) ***#1 BBC World Reggae Beat Top 10*** / No. 8 Choice FM (UK) Reggae Chart
- 2012: "Jah is the Only King" (Skinny Bwoy/Peckings) ***#1 BBC World Reggae Beat Top 10***
- 2016: "With You I'm Born Again feat. Twiggi" (Skinny Bwoy Records) ***#1 South Florida Reggae Singles chart*** / No. 2 NY Top 30 Reggae Singles Chart
- 2018: "I Want to Wake Up With You (Acoustic)" (Skinny Bwoy Records)

=== Collaborations ===
- 1998: The Ride of Your Life w/Lady Saw 99 Ways (VP Records)
- 1998: Lethal Weapon w/Mad Cobra – Cloak & Dagger Riddim (Shocking Vibes)
- 2007: Beautiful Girls Remix w/Sean Kingston (Promotional Use Only)
- 2008: Be Without You w/Mary J. Blige (Promotional Use Only)
- 2010: Rude Boy Reggae Remix w/Rihanna (Promotional Use Only)

=== Production credits ===
- 2007: Morning's Come – Producer/Co-producer all tracks Japan Release (Skinny Bwoy/P-Vine Records-JPN)
- 2008: True Singers: Sadiki Meets Sandra Cross – Producer all tracks (Skinny Bwoy/P-Vine Records-JPN)
- 2008: Morning's Come – Producer/Co-producer all tracks US Release (Skinny Bwoy Records)
- 2010: Lifeline – Co-producer all tracks (Skinny Bwoy/Joe Fraser Records)
- 2011: Fi Di Dancehall (Collaborative album with DJ Delly Ranx) – Producer/co-producer – individual tracks (Pure Music/Skinny Bwoy Records)
- 2011: The Living Legends Collection – Eric Monty Morris – Producer all tracks (Buckley Records)
- 2011: Hero Riddim – Various Artists – Producer all tracks (Skinny Bwoy Jamaica)
- 2011: Menace Riddim – Various Artists – Producer all tracks (Skinny Bwoy Jamaica)
- 2012: Jah Is The Only King – Co-Producer all tracks (Skinny Bwoy Jamaica)
- 2015: Smooth Jazz Meets Reggae – Helen Rogers – Producer/Co-producer all tracks (Skinny Bwoy Records)
- 2016: Covered in Love – Producer all tracks (Skinny Bwoy Records)
- 2016: Iyahcoustic – Ronnie Davis – Producer all tracks (Skinny Bwoy Records)

=== Mixtapes ===
- 2007: Unity Sound – Sadiki: The Sound Killachi Round 1
- 2010: Rebel Liberation Sound Kenya: Rude boy Finest Hosted by Sadiki
- 2010: Unity Sound Japan: Love Mood hosted by Sadiki
- 2011: Rebel Liberation Sound Kenya: Sadiki Volume 2

== Awards and nominations ==
IRAWMA (International Reggae and World Music Awards)

- 2007, Most Promising Entertainer (nominated)
- 2011, Most Promising Entertainer (nominated)
- 2012, Most Promising Entertainer (nominated)

== Managerial Credits ==
- Ronnie Davis R.I.P. Former manager
- The Tennors Former manager
- Eric "Monty" Morris Former manager as of 9/12
- Chalice (reggae band) Former manager as of 12/12
