= Helen Rogers =

British singer/songwriter (born 1962)

- Born: 1962 (age 62–63)
- Origin: London, England
- Genres: Reggae; Jazz; Funk; Soul
- Occupation(s): Session singer, songwriter
- Instrument: Vocals
- Years active: 1978–present

Helen Rogers (born in 1962) is a British singer/songwriter who has been active since 1978. She has been featured vocalist with Brit funk bands Direct Drive and 7th Heaven. She has also been a session singer for Paul Hardcastle.

== Career ==
She began singing in 1978 with One Stop Music, an independent South London label specialising in reggae music. After joining Brit funk band Direct Drive as lead vocalist in 1982, Rogers (along with bandmates Pete Quinton, Robert Williams, Mick Ward and Mick Hammond) entered the Black Echoes Top 20 with "In the Middle of Spring" and "Pass the Paper" respectively.

In December 1984 the band released "Anything?" which reached No. 1 in the UK Black Echoes chart, remaining there for six weeks, and crossed over to the UK Singles Chart peaking at No. 67. This occurred after the band had signed to Polydor Records. Direct Drive then released "A.B.C. (Falling in Love's Not Easy)" which also charted peaking at No. 75 in the UK Singles Chart.

Rogers continued to record with Pete Quinton, and provided vocals on two of his songs "Half Chances" and "Shifting Sands", which featured in the 1987 film Sammy and Rosie Get Laid. She also sang with funk band 7th Heaven, and provided vocals on Rory Bremner's spoof cricket version of Paul Hardcastle's "19" ("N-N-Nineteen Not Out" – UK No. 13). Rogers additionally provided backing vocals to Hardcastle's remix of Third World's "Now That We Found Love", and his version of Junior Walker's "Walk in the Night".

From 1989 to 1990 Rogers worked in the recording studio and undertook some gigs with Lee Fardon and his band. From 1992 onward, Rogers co-wrote and sang lead and backing vocals on Paul Hardcastle's project the Jazzmasters, which resulted in multiple number one hits in Japan and the US. She also wrote and recorded some tracks for Hardcastle's simultaneous eponymous project. Rogers recorded five albums with the Jazzmasters plus various compilation albums of hits e.g. The Smooth Cuts featuring Helen Rogers.

Returning to her lovers rock beginnings in 2003, Rogers recorded an album of reggae covers of 1970s pop hits with Black Steel. The duo had previously released a reggae version of "Tracks of My Tears" in 1988, which had reached the Top 10 in Jamaica.

In 2008, Rogers released an EP of songs co-written with guitarist Tony Qunta, entitled "Eyes Like Midnight", which was a departure in style and featured violin and cello played by Qunta. In 2011, she wrote and recorded a solo lovers rock album with the record producer Lindel Lewis.

Rogers completed a new solo album in 2015 called Smooth Jazz Meets Reggae, on Skinny Bwoy Records an American independent record label specialising in reggae music. The first single from that album, "In the Light", was released to radio. The album was released on 6 November 2015.

== Discography ==
=== Albums ===
- Smooth Jazz Meets Reggae (2015)

=== Singles ===
- "Candidate for Love" (1984)
- "Shifting Sands (Love So Hot)" (1988) (credited as Pete Quinton featuring Helen Rogers)

With Direct Drive

Year	Song	UK
1983	"In the Middle of Spring"	—
1984	"Pass the Paper"	—
1984	"Anything?"	67
1985	"A.B.C. (Falling in Love's Not Easy)"	75
1985	"I Need Some Sunshine"	—
"—" denotes releases that did not chart.

=== Vocal credits ===
- Paul Hardcastle - "No Winners" (1988)
- Paul Hardcastle - "Walk in the Night" (1988)
- The Jazzmasters - "Heaven" (1992)
- The Jazzmasters - "Without Love" (1992)
- The Jazzmasters - "Sound of Summer" (1993)
- Kiss The Sky - "Millennium Skyway" (1994)
- The Jazzmasters - "Really Miss Your Love" (1995)
- The Jazzmasters - "So Much in Love" (1995)
- Paul Hardcastle - "You May Be Gone" (1995)
- Paul Hardcastle - "Look to the Future" (1996)
- Paul Hardcastle - "Star of the Story" (1996)
- The Jazzmasters - "Dreamin" (1999)
