= Odysseus Abroad =

2014 novel by Amit Chaudhuri

- First edition (publ. Hamish Hamilton)
- Author: Amit Chaudhuri
- Language: English
- Publication date: 2014

Odysseus Abroad is a 2014 novel written by Amit Chaudhuri. The Odysseus of the title is a young Bengali studying English literature at an unnamed university in London. A review of the book in The New Yorker commented that "there is no obvious plot, no determined design, no faked "conflict" or other drama. The two men just go walking in North London."
