= Skinman =

Studio album by Allegiance
- Released: 1996
- Genres: Thrash metal, groove metal
- Length: 40:03
- Label: Mercury Records
- Producer: John Villani

Allegiance chronology
Time To React - Live! (1995)	Skinman (1996)

Skinman is the second and final studio album by Australian Thrash metal band Allegiance, released in 1996. The album was produced in Perth, Western Australia by John Villani.

== Track listing ==
No.	Title	Length
1.	"Ripped To Shreds"	3:42
2.	"Face Reality"	2:53
3.	"Give Yourself"	4:23
4.	"Scorn"	3:00
5.	"Time To React"	4:27
6.	"Trapped Behind A Shadow"	4:03
7.	"Wasted Life"	4:48
8.	"Taken By Force"	3:23
9.	"Pity"	3:08
10.	"Hands Of Fate"	6:12

== Personnel ==
- Conrad Higson – lead vocals
- Jason Stone – Guitar, Keyboards
- Tony Campo – Guitar
- David Harrison – Bass
- Glenn Butcher – Drums
- John Villani – Producer
