= D.e.s.t.i.t.u.t.i.o.n =

Studio album by Allegiance
- Released: 1994
- Studio: Planet Sound Studios
- Genre: Thrash metal
- Length: 46:33
- Label: Polygram
- Producer: Dave Pinsky, Allegiance

Allegiance chronology
| Torn Between Two Worlds (1992) | D.e.s.t.i.t.u.t.i.o.n (1994) | Time To React - Live! (1995) |

D.e.s.t.i.t.u.t.i.o.n is the first full-length album by Australian Thrash metal band Allegiance, released in 1994. The album was produced at Planet Sound Studios in Perth, Western Australia by Dave Pinsky. The album was mastered in the Netherlands by Attie Bauw.

== Track listing ==
1. "Intro" - 0:58
2. "Chaos Dies" - 3:30
3. "One Step Beyond" - 4:05
4. "Hate Frenzy" – 4:35
5. "Torn Between Two Worlds" – 5:39
6. "Destitution" - 3:59
7. "Morally Justified" - 4:00
8. "Path Of Lies" - 2:49
9. "Dealt The Cruel Hand" - 4:30
10. "Downward Spiral" - 4:21
11. "Twisted Minds" - 4:45
12. "Tranquility" - 3:17

== Personnel ==
- Conrad Higson – lead vocals
- Jason Stone – guitar, keyboards
- Tony Campo – guitar
- David Harrison – bass
- Glenn Butcher – drums
- Dave Pinsky – producer
- Allegiance – co-producer
- Les Williams – audio mixing
- Attie Bauw – audio mastering

== Charts ==
| Chart (1994) | Peak position |
|---|---|
| Australian Albums (ARIA Charts) | 87 |
