= Riparbella =

- Comune
- Comune di Riparbella
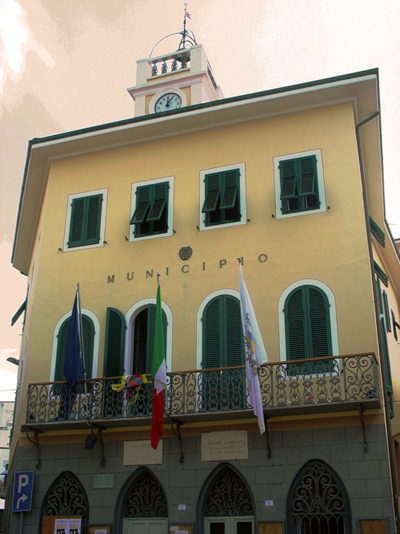
- Town Hall

- Flag Coat of arms

- Location within Italy Location within Tuscany
- Coordinates: 43°22′N 10°36′E
- Country: Italy
- Region: Tuscany
- Province: Pisa (PI)

Government
  - Mayor: Ghero Fontanelli

Area
  - Total: 58.7 km^{2} (22.7 sq mi)
- Elevation: 216 m (709 ft)

Population (Dec. 2013)
  - Total: 1,630
  - Density: 27.8/km^{2} (71.9/sq mi)
- Demonym: Riparbellini
- Time zone: UTC+1 (CET)
  - Summer (DST): UTC+2 (CEST)
- Postal code: 56046
- Dialing code: 0586
- Website: Official website

Riparbella is a comune (municipality) of 1,630 inhabitants of the Province of Pisa in the Italian region Tuscany, located about 70 kilometres (43 mi) southwest of Florence and about 40 kilometres (25 mi) southeast of Pisa.

== Notable people ==
- Gaetano Bardini (1926–2017), tenor.
