= Time to React – Live! =

Time To React - Live!

Live album by Allegiance
- Released: 1995
- Recorded: 17 December 1994
- Genre: Thrash metal
- Length: 39:11
- Label: Independent

Allegiance chronology
D.e.s.t.i.t.u.t.i.o.n (1994)	Time To React - Live! (1995)	Skinman (1996)

Time To React - Live! is the first live album by Australian Thrash metal band Allegiance, released in 1995. The album was recorded live at Triple J Studios in Perth, Western Australia on 17 December 1994.

== Track listing ==
No.	Title	Length
1.	"Chaos Dies"	4:45
2.	"Pity"	2:59
3.	"Trapped Behind A Shadow"	3:55
4.	"Hate Frenzy"	4:41
5.	"Time To React"	4:14
6.	"Taken By Force"	3:19
7.	"Torn Between Two Worlds"	5:52
8.	"One Step Beyond"	4:12
9.	"Downward Spiral"	5:09
