= Thomas Füri =

Swiss violinist and teacher

Thomas Füri (22 July 1947 – 23 July 2017)) was a Swiss violinist, and a teacher at the Hochschule für Musik Basel. He studied with his father Erich Füri and with Max Rostal at the Hochschule für Musik Bern. He completed his studies with Ivan Galamian at the Juilliard School in New York. From 1973 till 1980 he was leader in Koblenz, Lausanne and Basel. From 1979 till 1993 he led the Camerata Bern. From 1980 till 1991 he taught at the academies in Winterthur and Zürich. In 1985 he joined I Salonisti, appearing in the 1997 film Titanic. In 1993 he was awarded the Musikpreis des Kantons Bern. From 2000 he was a member of the Aria Quartet.

Thomas Füri played on a 1761 Giovanni Battista Guadagnini violin.

== Filmography ==
Year	Title	Role	Notes
1982	Was will die Freude ohne Gesang		
1997	Titanic	I Salonist Violin	
