= Evolver One =

- Also known as: Evolver
- Origin: Port Elizabeth
- Genres: Rock
- Years active: 2001-
- Members: Sean Murphy; Lez Dart
- Past members: Tulsa Pittaway; James Cohen; Peter Pote; Miguel Loureiro

Evolver One is a South African rock band. Established in Port Elizabeth in 2001 as Evolver, it renamed itself Evolver One in 2010. Its single "Criminal" reached the top 40 in June 2010.

It has had two chart-topping albums.

== Discography ==
- Get Up (2006)
- What's the Story? (2008)
- Evolver One (2010)
- What If (2014)
