= Ronnie Davis =

Jamaican reggae singer (1950–2017)

Background information
- Born: Jerome Constantine Bellin; 1950
- Origin: Jamaica
- Died: January 25, 2017 (aged 66–67) Savanna-la-Mar Hospital, Westmoreland
- Genres: Rocksteady, Roots reggae, Dancehall, dub
- Occupations: Singer; songwriter; record producer
- Instrument: Vocals
- Formerly of: The Tennors The Itals

Ronnie Davis (1950 – January 25, 2017) was a Jamaican reggae singer who was a member of The Tennors, The Itals, and the group Ronnie Davis & Idren. He lately performed as a solo artist.

== Biography ==
Born in Savanna-la-Mar, Westmoreland Parish, Jamaica, Davis started his singing career by entering local talent contests in the early 1960s. He formed a group called The Westmorlites, but his big break came in 1969 when he was asked to join The Tennors by the group's director Clive Murphy, to replace the recently deceased Maurice Johnson. Davis recorded a string of singles with the group during the late 1960s and early 1970s, but always yearned for a solo career, and had first chart-topping tune, "Won't You Come Home", for producer Lloyd Campbell in 1975. Davis also recorded a lot of material with Bunny Lee (much of which was included on the misleadingly-titled Sing Hits From Studio 1 And More in 1998), who produced his 1977 solo album Hard Times. Davis also worked with other producers such as Phil Pratt, Lloydie Slim, and Lee "Scratch" Perry, and enjoyed several hits during the mid-1970s, such as "Jah Jah Jehovah", "Forget Me Now", "On and On", "Babylon Falling", "Fancy Make Up", and one of his best-known solo tracks, "It's Raining". Davis also cut a few singles under the pseudonym Romey Pickett. A single titled In a Dis Ya Time featuring the "Won't You Come Home" rhythm with vocals re-cut by Keith Porter with vocal harmonies by Davis, was initially credited to Keith and Ronnie, but recognizing the popularity of vocal trios, with the addition of a third vocalist, Lloyd Ricketts, the song was re-released, credited to The Itals, and proved to be one of the year's best-selling singles in Jamaica.

Davis enjoyed major success as a member of The Itals, recording and touring the globe. Their 1987 release Rasta Philosophy was nominated for a GRAMMY Award as Best Reggae Album.

While staying with The Itals, Davis pursued a parallel solo career, his next album being a split release with Gregory Isaacs for producer Ossie Hibbert (1979), with further releases following, including 1985's The Incredible Ronnie Davis Sings For You And I.

Davis left The Itals in 1995, to again pursue a solo career, forming the vocal group, Ronnie Davis & Idren, featuring harmony singers Roy Smith (an old schoolfriend), Robert Doctor and fellow former-Ital Lloyd Ricketts. The group performed around the United States, and in 1997 released their first album, Come Straight , to much critical acclaim.

Ronnie Davis toured with The Pocket Band of Washington, DC in 2007 and 2008. In 2009 Davis again joined forces with Keith Porter and David Isaacs to tour as The Itals. Ronnie Davis and Keith Porter toured as The Itals after the passing of Davi Isaacs in 2009 and Lloyd Ricketts in 2011. In March 2012, after a near 35-year hiatus, The Tennors reunited with George Murphy aka "Clive Tennors", Ronnie Davis and a new member Henry Buckley Jr. aka Sadiki. The Tennors continue to tour without Davis and Sadiki.

In 2016 Davis released the Sadiki-produced album Iyahcoustic on Skinny Bwoy Records. The album featured reworkings of highly regarded spiritually conscious, philosophically reflective, contemplative tunes like Got to Go Home and My World.

== Album discography ==
- Ronnie Davis Presents Beautiful People From Jamaica (1976), DIP
- Hard Times (1977), Third World
- Gregory Isaacs Meets Ronnie Davis (1979), Plant
- Crucial, Big Mac Soul Power
- The Incredible Ronnie Davis Sings For You And I (1985), Vista
- Sing Hits From Studio 1 And More (1997), Rhino
- Wheel of Life (2005), Upstairs Music
- Jamming In Dub (2006), Jamaican Recordings
- Come Straight (1997), Nighthawk (Ronnie Davis & Idren)
- Oh Lord, Why Lord
- Iyahcoustic (2016), Skinny Bwoy

With The Itals

- The Early Recordings: 1971-1979 (1984) Nighthawk
- Brutal Out Deh (1981) Nighthawk
- Give Me Power! (1983) Nighthawk
- Rasta Philosophy (1986) Nighthawk
- Cool and Dread (1989) Nighthawk
- Easy to Catch (1991) Rhythm Safari
- Modern Age (1998) RAS
- Mi Livity (2003) Ital Music
- Let Dem Talk (2009) Ital Music

== Death ==
Jerome Constantine Ballin, popularly known as Ronnie Davis, suffered a major stroke on January 23, 2017, and peacefully died in the evening of Wednesday, January 25, 2017, surrounded by family members.

"I am heartbroken by the news of Ronnie's passing. We have been through so much together. Ronnie is like a little brother to me" said Clive Murphy the leader and founder of the Tennors "The world has lost a great musician who loved life, God and his family"

Ronnie Davis is survived by his common-law wife Jennifer Ottey, his mother in England, his brothers and sisters, his daughters Shauna, Stacy, Simone and Jasmine, sons Ryan, Christopher, Jason, his grand-children, his extended family, and his many friends and fans.
