= Sophy Wong =

Hong Kong singer-songwriter

Sophy
- 王嘉儀
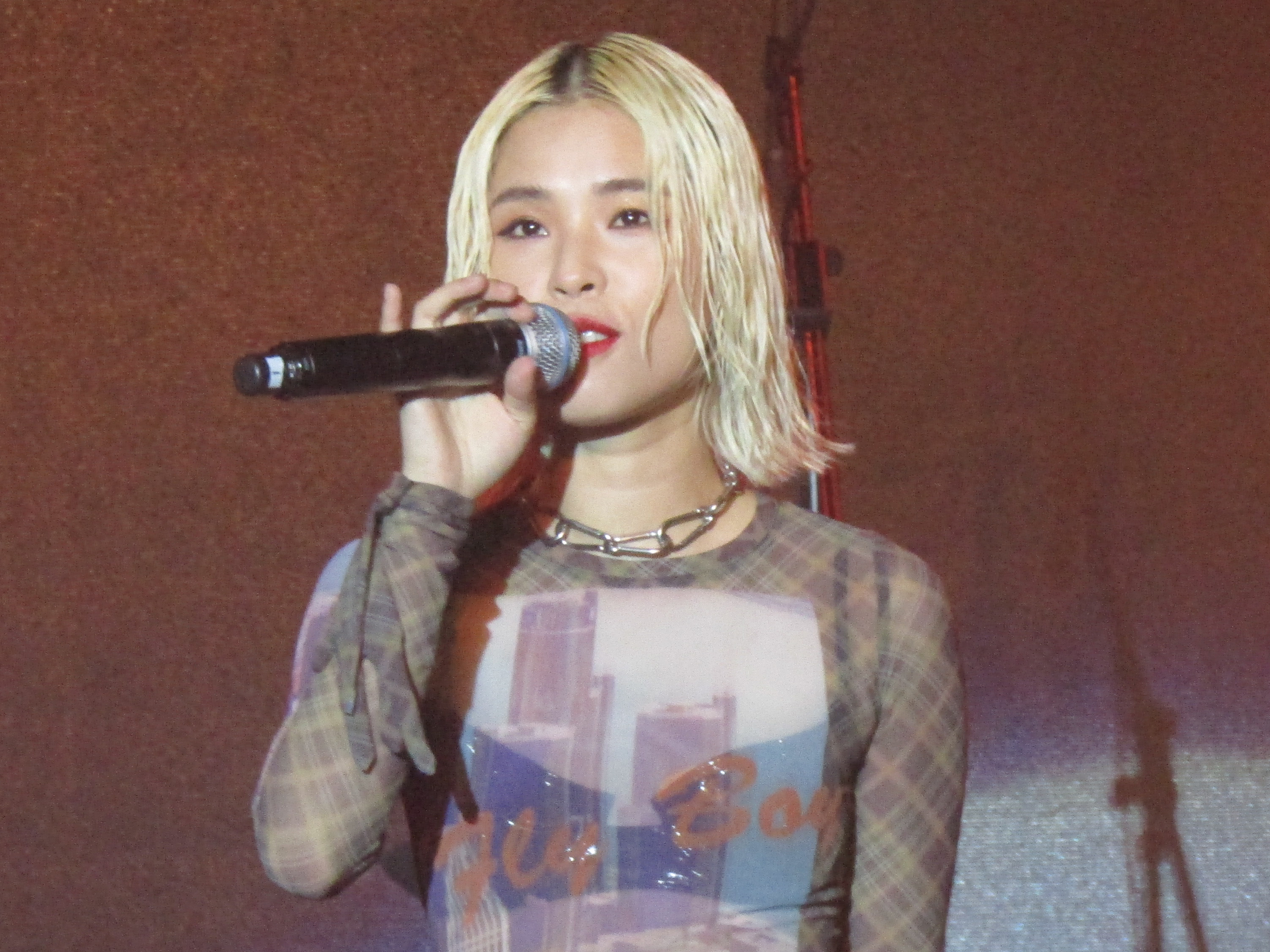
- Born: Wong Ka Yee, Sophia; 16 February 1992 (age 33); Hong Kong
- Occupations: Singer-songwriter; record labels owner
- Musical career
- Genres: Cantopop; Art Pop; Urban Contemporary
- Instruments: Vocals; Piano
- Years active: 2009–present
- Labels: TVB (2009-2012); Bunny Eats Ltd; Ksana Artist Management Limited
- Website: Sophysophy

Sophy Wong (simplified Chinese: 王嘉仪; traditional Chinese: 王嘉儀; pinyin: Wáng Jiā Yí; born 16 February 1992), also known as SOPHY, is a Hong Kong singer-songwriter.

== Career ==
Wong came 7th in The Voice (Hong Kong) in 2009. She released her debut EP, Sophrology EP and formed her record label, Bunny Eats Ltd with Tsang-Hei Chiu in 2017. She followed up with her second EP, QUARTER EP

== Discography ==
=== Extended plays ===
#	EP Name	Label	Released Date(s)	Tracklisting
1st	Sophrology	Bunny Eats Ltd.	13 November 2016 (Digital); 24 February 2017 (Physical)	1. Like A Gun; 2. Abyss; 3. U Got Me Mad; 4. Little Sorrow; 5. Ain't No Easy Way (Demo)
2nd	Quarter	Bunny Eats Ltd.	12 November 2017	1. 美麗新世界; 2. Leaving Home; 3. Interlude（Leaving Home）; 4. Unbreathable; 5. In Between（ft. Kiri Tse）; 6. 翩翩

== Awards and nominations ==
Sophy Wong awards and nominations
Awards and nominations
Award	Wins	Nominations
Jade Solid Gold Best Ten Music Awards Presentation	1	1
Metro Radio Music Awards	1	1
RTHK Top 10 Gold Songs Awards	1	1
Ultimate Song Chart Awards Presentation	1	1
Yahoo！Asia Buzz Awards	1	1

Totals (Note: Certain award groups do not simply award one winner. They acknowledge several different recipients, have runners-up, and have third place. Since this is a specific recognition and is different from losing an award, runner-up mentions are considered wins in this award tally. For simplification and to avoid errors, each award in this list has been presumed to have had a prior nomination.)
- Wins: 5
- Nominations: 5

=== Jade Solid Gold Best Ten Music Awards Presentation ===
Year	Award	Work	Result	Ref
2017	Best Singer-songwriter	Herself	Silver Award	

=== Metro Radio Music Awards ===
Year	Award	Work	Result	Ref
2017	Best New Artist	Herself	Won	

=== RTHK Top 10 Gold Songs Awards ===
Year	Award	Work	Result	Ref
2017	Best New Artist	Herself	Silver Award	

=== Ultimate Song Chart Awards Presentation ===
Year	Award	Work	Result	Ref
2018	Best New Artist	Herself	Won	

=== Yahoo！Asia Buzz Awards ===
Year	Award	Work	Result	Ref
2017	Best New Artist	Herself	Won	
