= Kanave Kalayathe =

Studio album by Abee Joe, Sachin Warrier
- Released: 14 April 2017
- Recorded: Kerala
- Genre: Melody
- Length: 5:08
- Label: Muzik247
- Producer: Nidhinsha

Singles from Kanave Kalayathe
- 1. "Kanave Kalayathe" Released: 14 April 2017

Kanave Kalayathe (transl. Dreams never disappear) is an album sung by Sachin Warrier starring Leon Poulose, Swetha Raj, Akash Thomas, NeethuKrishna VR, Christy Vazhapilly and Althaf. The soundtrack was composed by Abee Joe. It was produced by Nidhinsha and distributed by Muzik247. The music video is directed by Deen Shifaz and Ashith wilson.

== Music-soundtrack ==
The song is composed by Abee Joe, Recorded and mastered at MyStudio, Ernakulam. Lyrics by Mageswaran.
