= Tulsa Pittaway =

South African drummer (1974–2017)

- Birth name: Tulsa Theodore Pittaway
- Born: 9 December 1974; Harare, Zimbabwe
- Died: 21 May 2017 (aged 42); Johannesburg, Gauteng, South Africa
- Occupations: Musician; songwriter
- Instrument: Drums
- Years active: 1994–2017
- Labels: Nebula Records; EMI
- Website: tulsapittaway.co.za

Tulsa Pittaway (born Tulsa Theodore Pittaway; 9 December 1974 – 21 May 2017) was a South African musician. He was best known as the drummer for the South African Music Award-winning indie rock band Watershed as well as Evolver One and Brothering. He was also known for his solo works.
