= Sukanya (opera) =

2017 opera by Ravi Shankar

- by Ravi Shankar
- Librettist: Amit Chaudhuri
- Language: Sanskrit
- Premiere: 12 May 2017; Linbury Studio Theatre, Royal Opera House, London

Sukanya is an opera composed by Ravi Shankar, with libretto by novelist Amit Chaudhuri. It is based on the mythological tale of Sukanya from the Hindu epic Mahabharata, and combines Western operatic conventions with Indian vocal music, konnakol, and Indian instruments.

It is Ravi Shankar's only opera and was left unfinished on his death in September 2012. British conductor and composer David Murphy, Shankar's collaborator on the project, finished the score using his detailed notes in 2017. Sukanya received its world premiere in May 2017 at the Royal Opera House in London.

== Composition history ==
In 1995, Shankar began composing the opera after he felt inspired by the similarity between the mythological tale of Sukanya, found in the Hindu epic Mahabharata, and his own love affair with his wife, also named Sukanya. Aiming to create a "21st-century opera: a cross-cultural, total art work for a globalized world", Shankar worked on the piece until his death.

== Instrumentation ==
Apart from the Western orchestra, the opera makes use of Indian instruments like tabla, sitar, shehnai, and mridangam.

== Performance history ==
After Shankar's death in 2012, British conductor and composer David Murphy worked on the piece for five years. He made use of extensive notations that Shankar had left behind, or vocally transmitted to Murphy while he was alive. The opera received its world premiere, in a collaboration with London Philharmonic Orchestra and BBC Singers and with funding by the Bagri Foundation, in May 2017 In addition to the opera house, it was performed at the Southbank Centre's Royal Festival Hall, Curve theatre in Leicester, and Symphony Hall, Birmingham.

The opera was revived in January 2020 at the Royal Festival Hall in London.

A suite based on the opera is due to be premiered at the 2026 Granada Festival.
