= Leeroy =

Leeroy is a variant spelling of the American given name Leroy, which may refer to:

== People ==
- Leeroy Anton (born 1985), French former footballer
- Leeroy Makovora (born 2002), Scottish footballer
- Leeroy Mavunga (born 1998), Zimbabwean footballer
- Leeroy New (born 1986), Filipino fine artist
- Leeroy Owusu (born 1996), Dutch professional footballer
- Leeroy Poulter (born 1981), South African racing team driver
- Leeroy Reed (born 1990), Welsh television star and recording artist
- Leeroy Stagger, Canadian singer-songwriter
- Leeroy Thornhill (born 1968), British electronic music artist
- Leeroy Wilfred Kabs-Kanu (born 1954), American journalist
- LeeRoy Yarbrough (1938–1984), American stock car racer

=== Fictional characters ===
- Leeroy Jenkins, player character and Internet meme originating in the computer game World of Warcraft

== See also ==
- Leroy
