= The Joystrings =

1960s British Christian music group

- Origin: England
- Genres: Gospel
- Years active: 1963–1969
- Past members: Thelma Adams; Brenda Alexander; Lillian Boot; Peter Dalziel; Bill Davidson; Handle Everett; Sylvia Gair; Wycliffe Noble; Joy Webb
- Website: https://www.salvationarmy.org.uk

The Joystrings (originally credited as The Joy Strings) were a 1960s British Christian music group led by classically trained keyboard player and singer Joy Webb, who was an officer in the Salvation Army.

== History ==
After appearing on Cliff Michelmore's BBC Tonight television show, they were given a recording contract by EMI Records. In 1964, they became the first Salvation Army pop group to achieve chart success with "It's An Open Secret" and "A Starry Night". The main members through the years were Joy Webb (who wrote the group's first hit), Peter and Sylvia Dalziel, Bill Davidson, and Wycliffe Noble. The group had a number of other singers drawn, at intervals, from cadets at the William Booth Memorial Training College, Denmark Hill in London.

They also recorded a version of "O Little Town of Bethlehem," using the music of The Animals' "The House of the Rising Sun" - an unusual blending.

In September 2013, 50 years after the Joystrings' formation, group member Sylvia Dalziel published her memoir, The Joystrings: The Story of the Salvation Army Pop Group.

Wycliffe Noble died on 1 April 2017, at the age of 91. Joy Webb died on 1 October 2023, at the age of 91.

== Discography ==
=== Singles ===
- "It's An Open Secret" (1964) – UK Number 32 (Regal Zonophone: RZ501)
- "Million Songs" (1964)
- "A Starry Night" (1964) – UK Number 34
- "All Alone" (1965)
- "The Only One" (1965)
- "No Time To Lose"/"Love That's All Around" (Epic Records (USA): 5-10195)
- "Christmas Can Be Every Day For You" (1966)

=== EPs ===
- The Joy Strings (1964)
- Have Faith in God (1965)
- Christmas with The Joy Strings (1965)
- Joy Strings abroad (1966)
- The song break (1967)

=== Albums ===
- Well Seasoned (1966) Regal Zonophone, LRZ4016 mono; SLRZ4016 stereo, UK
- Well Seasoned (1966) EPIC Records, US
- Carols Around The World (1967)
- Joystrings Restrung (2011)
- Joystrings Christmas Collection (2012)

== Bibliography ==
- Gilliard, A.J. (1967). Joy and the Joystrings: The Salvation Army's 'Pop Group'. Lutterworth Press.
- Joy Webb (2000). Bridge of Songs. The Salvation Army. ISBN 085412683X
- Sylvia Dalziel (2013). The Joystrings. The Salvation Army. ISBN 0854129065
