= Naomi Sego =

American gospel singer (1931–2017)

Naomi Sego Reader
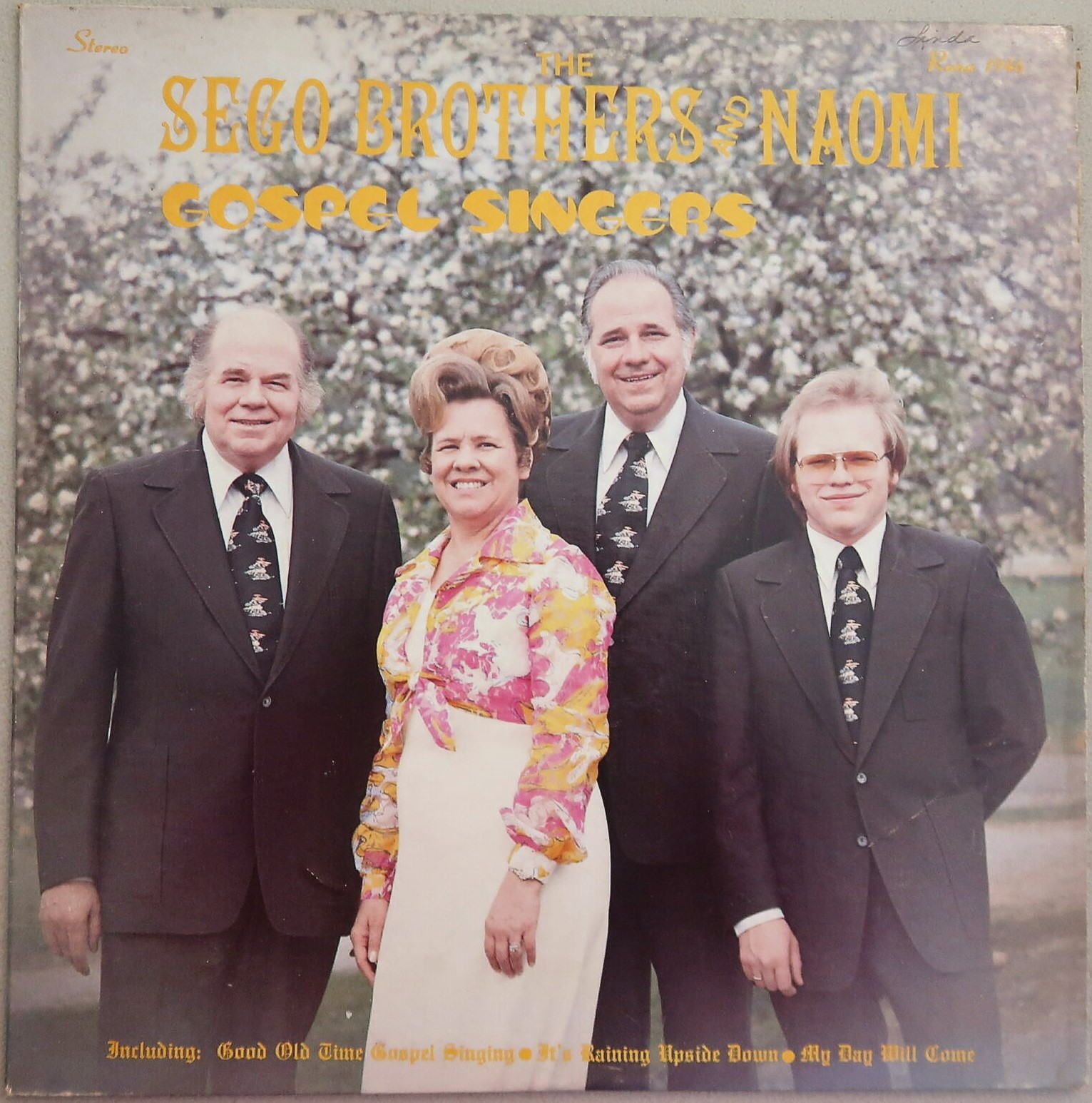
- Naomi Sego (second from left) and the Sego Brothers on a 1978 album cover

Background information
- Born: Naomi Ruth Easter; February 17, 1931; Enigma, Georgia, U.S.
- Died: November 3, 2017 (aged 86) Houston County, Georgia, U.S.
- Genres: Southern gospel
- Occupation: Singer
- Instrument: Vocals
- Years active: 1958–2008

Naomi Sego Reader (February 17, 1931 – November 3, 2017) was a Southern gospel singer and recording artist. She is recognized as one of the great female icons of southern gospel music.

== Life and career ==
Naomi Sego was born Naomi Ruth Easter in Enigma, Georgia to Jonathan Andrew and Nona Cook Easter. She had four sisters and three brothers.

In 1946, singer James Sego formed a singing group with his brothers Lamar and Walter "W.R." called “The Harmony Kings”, before settling on the name “The Sego Brothers.” Naomi Easter met James Sego in 1948. They were married in 1949 and had two sons, James Carlton and Ronnie.

Sego started her singing career in 1958 when one of the Sego brothers fell ill and she was asked to fill in for him. The group was first called The Sego Brothers and Naomi but later changed their name to Naomi and The Sego Brothers. They released nearly 50 albums by 1962 and performed regularly on The Gospel Singing Jubilee television series and later on stage at The Grand Ole Opry. Sego also sang as a featured artist for the Gaither Homecoming between 1993 and 2009.

Sego was featured on The Sego Brothers' first album with the song Is My Lord Satisfied With Me. The album sold more than 300,000 copies. Lamar left the group in 1967 and Walter “W.R.” left in 1979. Sego continued singing and recording with son Ronnie, who joined the group playing drums. In 1984, they changed their name to “The Segos and Naomi” and by 1990 they had changed it again to “Naomi and The Segos.”

The Sego Brothers and Naomi was the first Southern Gospel Group to sell over a million records with the song Sorry, I Never Knew You in 1964.

In 1979, Sego's husband, James, died during heart surgery at age 51 in Columbia, SC. In 1983, Sego married Rev. Vernon Reader. Reader served as manager for the group and also sang with them. Reader died in 1998. Despite losing both her husbands and son Ronnie in 1996 due to diabetes, Sego continued to sing and record for many years, recording more than 70 albums in her career. She was inducted into the Southern Gospel Music Association Hall of Fame in 2001.

Naomi Sego Reader had eight grandchildren and ten great-grandchildren. Naomi won numerous awards and accolades in her 50 plus year career and sung on some of the most prestigious stages in the nation; Naomi appeared on many television shows, had numerous hit songs on the gospel music charts, and sold millions of recordings.”

Naomi Sego Reader died on November 3, 2017.
