= Fanxy Red =

Chinese-Korean pop group

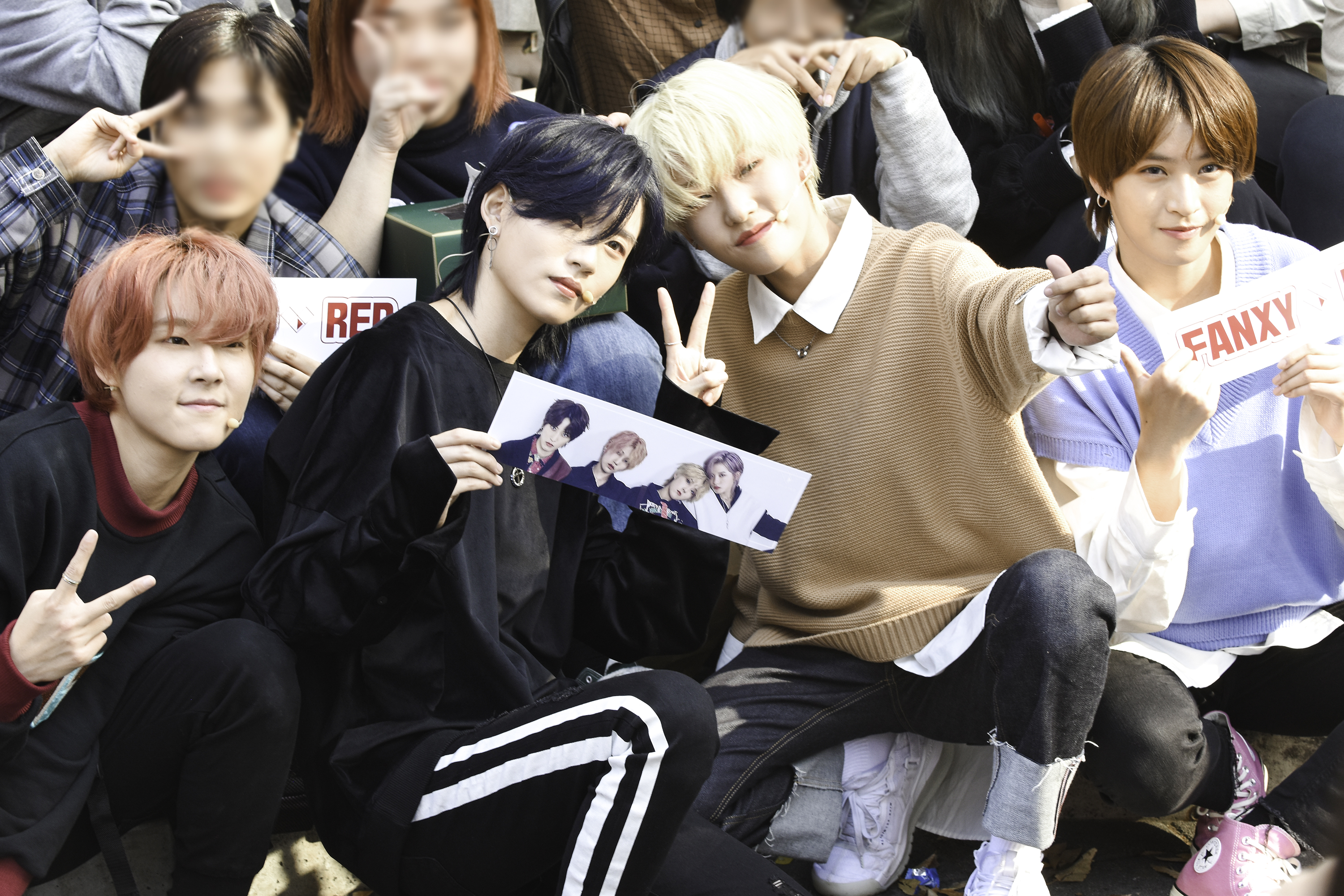
- Fanxy Red promotional busking in Hongdae, November 2019; From left to right: Roy, K, Shawn, and Marco

Background information
- Also known as: FFC-Acrush; Acrush
- Origin: Jinhua, Zhejiang, China
- Genres: C-pop; K-pop
- Years active: 2017–present
- Labels: FFC; TOV
- Members: Roy
- Past members: Jun Qian; Yu Xuan; Joel; Shawn; K; Marco
- Website: tovglobal.com

Fanxy Red (Korean: 팬시레드), previously known as FFC-Acrush or simply Acrush, is a Chinese girl group. They debuted in 2017 and released their first single album, Activate, in 2019.

== Artistry ==
=== Image ===
Fanxy Red's style is often described as androgynous or tomboyish, being mentioned in Chinese media as "meishaonian" (美少年) which means "handsome youths". In 2017, Dazed described the group as "cisgender girls, whose hair, make-up and clothes make them look uncannily like Korean boy bands – which don't really dress like girls, but also don't really dress like boys."

In the past, Lu Keran stated the company doesn't allow her to discuss her own or her teammates' sexual orientations, and has since corrected anyone calling her a boy, instead stating that she is a girl.

== Members ==
=== Current ===
A new member is yet to be announced by TOV Entertainment as of August 28, 2025.

Stage name	Korean name	Birth name	Chinese name
Roy	로이	An Junxi	安俊浠

=== Former ===
Stage name	Korean name	Birth name	Chinese name	Departure date
Jun Qian		Min Junqian	闵俊千	3 December 2017
Yu Xuan		Feng Yuxuan	冯舆轩	February 2018
Joel	조엘	Peng Yiyang	彭亦阳	April 2019
Shawn	숀	Peng Xichen	彭兮辰	9 March 2022
K	케이	Lu Keran	陆柯燃	23 December 2024
Marco	마르코	Lin Fan	林凡	19 June 2025

== Discography ==
=== Single albums ===
Title	Album details	Peak chart positions	Sales
Title	Album details	KOR	Sales
Korean
Activate	Released: 28 August 2019; Label: TOV Entertainment; Formats: CD, digital download; Track listing: 1. "Holla"; 2. "T.O.P"; 3. "T.O.P" (Korean version); 4. "守望星"; 5. "T.O.P" (instrumental)	89	

=== Singles ===
Title	Year	Peak chart positions	Sales	Album
Title	Year	KOR	Sales	Album
Chinese
"Action" (行动派)	2017	—	—N/a	Non-album singles
"I’m Sorry"	2017	—	—N/a	Non-album singles
"Sanlitun Girls"	2020	—		
Korean
"T.O.P"	2019	—	—N/a	Activate
"—" denotes song did not chart or was not released in that region.
