= Watershed (South African band) =

South African pop rock band

- Origin: Johannesburg, South Africa
- Genres: Pop rock
- Years active: 1998–present
- Labels: EMI
- Members: Craig Hinds; Howard Combrink; James Sunney; Quintin Askes; Paul McIver
- Website: watershedtheband.co.za

Watershed is a South African pop rock band founded in Johannesburg in 1998.

== History ==
Most famous for their signature tune 'Indigo Girl' in 2002, Watershed became a 'natural' success when a German radio DJ heard the single whilst vacationing in South Africa and played it on the air in Germany. The band toured in June 2010 with MacStanley through Germany as part of the Rock Kick Off tour, which is hosted by German Music Television station Imusic1.

The band's song "Fine Way" was used in an advert for restaurant chain Wimpy in 2004.

In 2006 drummer Tulsa Pittaway left the group. He then joined Evolver (later renamed Evolver One) and has also released a solo album.

Hinds released his first solo album, Ordinary Boy, in 2013

== Band members ==
- Craig Warren Hinds (lead vocals/piano/acoustic guitar)
- Paul McIver (guitar & vocals)
- Howard Combrink (drums)
- Gideon Botes (guitar)
- Quintin Askes (bass)

== South African discography ==
This is Watershed's South African discography. They have released records in Germany and possibly elsewhere.

=== Singles ===
- "In the Meantime" (2002)
- "Indigo Girl" (2002)
- "Fine Way" (2003)
- "Letters" (2006)
- "Close My Eyes" (2006)
- "Magical Energy" (2015)

=== Albums ===
- In the Meantime, released in 2002 — achieved platinum
- Wrapped in Stone, released in 2003 — achieved gold
- Mosaic, released 10 October 2005 — achieved platinum
- Staring at the Ceiling, released on 4 August 2008 — achieved gold
- A Million Faces (double CD, best of Watershed), released in 2010
- Watch the Rain, released in September 2015
- Harbour, released in November 2018
- Elephant In The Room, released in 2021
