= Wycliffe Noble =

Scottish musician and architect

Charles Wycliffe Noble OBE FRIBA FRSA (12 June 1925 – 1 April 2017) was a Scottish musician and architect known for his work with the Joystrings and in making public buildings accessible to disabled people. The buildings Wycliffe Noble worked on to make them usable for disabled people include the Royal Albert Hall, UK Parliament, and Westminster.
