= Amit Chaudhuri =

Indian poet and classical singer (born 1962)

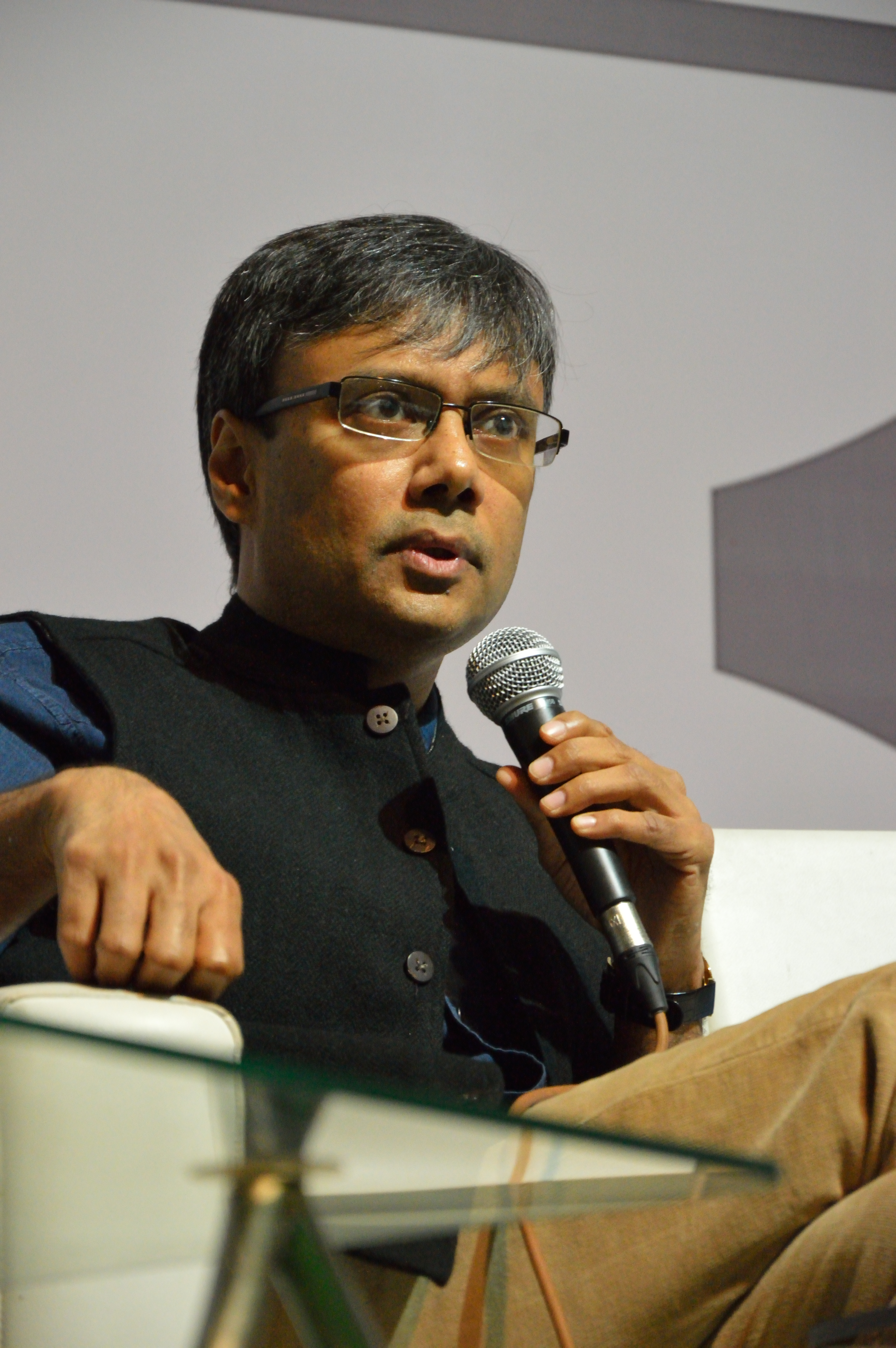
- Born: 15 May 1962; Kolkata
- Occupations: Writer, literary scholar, literary critic, musician
- Writing career
- Language: English language
- Notable awards: Sahitya Akademi Award, Fellow of the Royal Society of Literature
- Website: www.amitchaudhuri.com

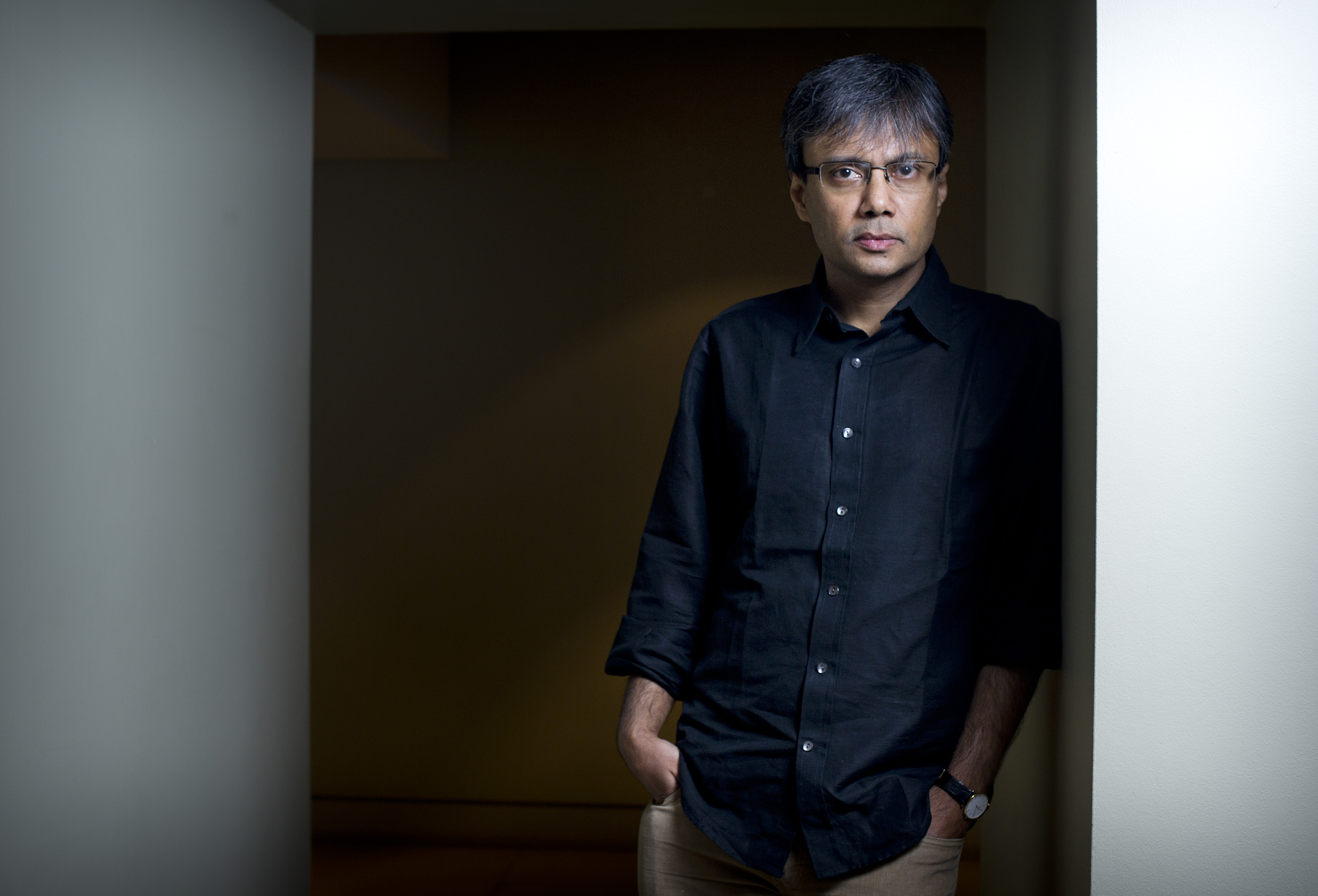
Amit Chaudhuri

Amit Chaudhuri (born 15 May 1962) is a novelist, poet, essayist, literary critic, editor, singer, and music composer from India. He is currently a professor of creative writing at Ashoka University.

He was previously professor of contemporary literature at the University of East Anglia from 2006 to 2021. In 2013, he was awarded the Infosys Prize for outstanding contribution to the humanities in Literary Studies.

In January 2018, Chaudhuri began writing a series for The Paris Review titled The Moment. He also wrote an occasional column, "Telling Tales", for The Telegraph.

== Personal life ==
Amit Chaudhuri was born in Calcutta (renamed Kolkata) in 1962 and grew up in Bombay (renamed Mumbai). He took his first degree in English literature from University College London, and wrote his doctoral dissertation on D. H. Lawrence's poetry at Balliol College, Oxford.

He is married to Rosinka Chaudhuri, Professor of Cultural Studies and Director of the Centre for Studies in Social Sciences, Calcutta (CSSSC).

== Music ==
Chaudhuri is a singer in the North Indian classical tradition, who has performed internationally. He learned singing from his mother, Bijoya Chaudhuri, and from the late Pandit Govind Prasad Jaipurwale of the Kunwar Shyam gharana.

== Awards and honours ==
- 1991 Betty Trask Award and Commonwealth Writers' Prize for Best First Book for A Strange and Sublime Address
- 1994 Encore Award and Southern Arts Literature Prize, Afternoon Raag
- 2009 Elected Fellow of the Royal Society of Literature.
- 2012 Infosys Prize for the Humanities in Literary Studies
- 2020 Honorary Fellow, Modern Language Association (MLA)
- 2022 James Tait Black Memorial Prize, Biography, Finding the Raga.

== Bibliography ==
=== Novels ===
- A strange and sublime address. Penguin, 1991, ISBN 978-0-143-41944-0
- Afternoon Raag. Heinemann, 1993, ISBN 978-0-434-12349-0 The book won the Encore Award. The 25th anniversary edition was published by Penguin Random House India in 2019 with a foreword by James Wood.
- Freedom Song. Picador, 1998; Alfred A. Knopf, 1999, ISBN 978-0-375-40427-6 excerpt
- A New World. Picador. 2000. ISBN 978-0-375-41093-2.; Random House Digital, Inc., 2002, ISBN 978-0-375-72480-0
- The Immortals. Picador. 2009. ISBN 978-0-307-27022-1.
- — (2015). Odysseus Abroad. Hamish Hamilton.
- Friend of My Youth, 2017, Penguin Random House India
- Sojourn. Faber & Faber. 2022. ISBN 978-0-571-36036-9.

=== Collected short stories ===
- Chaudhuri, Amit (2002). Real time : stories and a reminiscence. Picador.

=== Poetry ===
- Chaudhuri, Amit (2005). St. Cyril Road and other poems. Penguin.

=== Libretto ===
- Sukanya, the only opera by Ravi Shankar

=== Non-fiction ===
- Chaudhuri, Amit (2003). D. H. Lawrence and 'difference' : postcoloniality and the poetry of the present. Oxford University Press.
- Small Orange Flags (Seagull, 2003) reviewed
- Clearing A Space: Reflections on India, Literature and Culture. Peter Lang. 2008. ISBN 978-1-906165-01-7.
- Calcutta: Two Years in the City, Union Books (2013)
- Finding the Raga: An Improvisation on Indian Music. New York Review Books. 2021. ISBN 978-1-681-37478-9.

=== Edited anthologies ===
- Chaudhuri, Amit, ed. (2001). The Picador book of modern Indian literature. Picador.
- Memory's Gold: Writings on Calcutta (2008)

=== Dissertation ===
Chaudhuri's D.Phil. dissertation at Oxford was published by Clarendon Press as a monograph titled D.H. Lawrence and Difference in 2003. It was called a "classic" by Tom Paulin in his preface to the book; Terry Eagleton wrote in the London Review of Books that it is "a fine book, which if it had expanded its scope and dug rather deeper might even have been even better".

== See also ==
- List of Indian writers
