= Black Steel =

Black Steel is an Australian heavy metal band, whose career highlights include supporting rock legends Deep Purple (2000), Judas Priest (2001, 2008), Zakk Wylde's Black Label Society (2006) and appearing at the Metallica-headlined 'Big Day Out' Perth show in 2004. They are listed in Garry Sharpe-Young's 'The A-Z of Power Metal', and have received international acclaim in the genre. Most notably in 'Kerrang!' magazine. with a KKKK rating, and 'Power Play' magazine with a 7/10 rating. Iron Maiden lead singer Bruce Dickinson also spoke favourably of Black Steel during his BBC radio show 'Bruce's Rock Show', playing the track 'Slaughterhouse' from the band's 2005 album 'Hellhammer'.

== Releases ==
To date, Black Steel has released the EP 'Battle Call' (MGM Distribution 2000), full-length album 'Destructor' (MGM/Steelheart 2001), single 'Relentless Force' (2004), and full-length album 'Hellhammer' (MGM/Steelheart 2005). All albums were released on CD in Australia and overseas. 'Destructor' was also released in Russia and the Baltic states on the CD Maximum label, and a limited pressing on vinyl of 'Hellhammer' was released by Killer Metal Records.

Black Steel also recorded a cover of AC/DC's 'Dirty Deeds Done Dirt Cheap' for the 'AC/DC Hometown Tribute' album (Seeing Ear Records 2000). Appearances on other tribute albums include 'A Tribute To the Glory of 80's Metal' (Steelheart 2004) for their version of Saxon's 'Power & The Glory', and Pantera's Dimebag Darrell tribute album 'The Art of Shredding – A Tribute To Dime' (DarkStar 2006).

All Black Steel releases have since been made available digitally on iTunes.

== Line-Ups ==
The original line-up of Black Steel, formed in late 1999, consisted of Dave Harrison (ex-Allegiance) on bass, Jamie Page (ex-Trilogy, Black Alice, and writing credits for Queen guitarist Brian May, for the song 'Resurrection') on guitar, Matt Williams (ex-Project X) on vocals, and Jeff Oliver (ex-The Poor Boys, Ian Kenny band). Andrew Di Stefano then joined the line-up as a second guitarist. Prior to recording their debut, the 'Battle Call' EP, new drummer Damien Petrilli joined the band. This line-up continued until after the release of their first full-length album 'Destructor'. Jamie Page had a break from the band for a year, and guitarist Emanuel Rudnicki ('Voyager') joined the line-up. Page returned when Di Stefano left the line-up, and shortly after the band became a four-piece, consisting of Page, Harrison, Williams and new drummer Simon Wisniewski. This line-up recorded the three-track single 'Relentless Force' in 2004, after which Petrilli returned as the band's drummer to record the 'Hellhammer' album. Following the release of 'Hellhammer', guitarist Adrian Pertrache joined as second guitarist, returning Black Steel's twin-guitar attack sound to the ensuing live performances.

== Re-union ==
After a hiatus of nearly two years, the original recording line-up of Black Steel re-united for a support slot with Judas Priest during that band's 2008 'Nostradamus' tour, at Challenge Stadium in Perth, Western Australia.

== Former members ==
The current line-up of Black Steel is Matt Williams (vocals) Jamie Page (guitar) Andrew Di Stefano (guitar) Dave Harrison (bass) Damien Petrilli (drums). Former members include Adrian Pertrache (guitar), Simon Wisniewski (drums), Emmanuel Rudnicki (guitar), and Jeff Oliver (drums).

== Band Members' Other Projects ==
Jamie Page has since recorded the guitar instrumental tracks, 'Escape 666' and 'SS Rejected', the former of which featured on a guitar compilation album. In 2009, Matt Williams released the classic rock inspired, self-titled EP 'Humungous D' both digitally and on CD, as well as a ballad entitled 'Angel' digitally. Damien Petrilli formed the progressive metal band 'Evolution Machine', also featuring former Black Steel guitarist Emanuel Rudnicki. The band was launched officially in February 2010. Andrew Di Stefano formed an original band 'Engine of Reason'.

In 2011, Matt Williams re-formed 'Project X' with that band's co-founder Rick Lovett, and released the 13 track album 'D Generation' under 'Project X Australia'. Williams, Jamie Page and Dave Harrison all appeared on the album, which was released independently both digitally and on CD that same year.

== Discography ==
- Hellhammer – LP album (Killer Metal Records 2005)
- Hellhammer – CD album (Steelheart Records / MGM Distribution 2005)
- Relentless Force – CD single (MGM Distribution 2004)
- Destructor (European version) – CD album (Steelheart Records 2002)
- Destructor – CD album (MGM Distribution 2001)
- Battle Call – CD EP (MGM Distribution 2000)
