= I Salonisti =

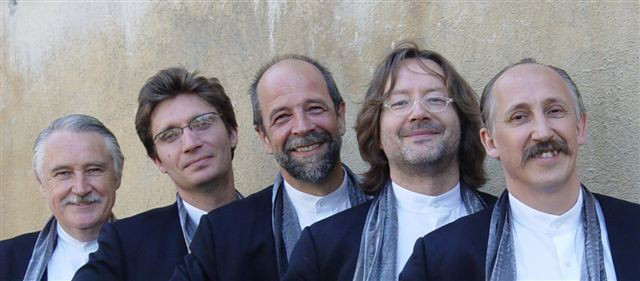
I Salonisti members in 2006

I Salonisti is a chamber music ensemble, best known for portraying and performing as the band on the RMS Titanic in James Cameron's 1997 blockbuster film Titanic. Founded in 1981 with the idea of specialising in "salon" music (background music played for passengers in ocean liners), I Salonisti performs both serious and light chamber music from various periods, countries and musical styles.

Its repertoire includes original compositions and new arrangements of traditional classical works, as well as popular music of the past and dance music from around the world. In concert, I Salonisti builds its programmes around specific themes, and the music is frequently interspersed with poetry and other literary texts, slides and appearances by guest artists. The ensemble is signed to the classical music label Decca Records.

== Albums ==
- Serenata: I Salonisti Play Music Of The Grand Salon (1983)
- ¡Tangos! Music Of The Grand Salon (1984)
- Orient Express (1989)
- Trans Atlantic A Musical Voyage from the Old World to the New (1989)
- And The Band Played On (Music Played On The Titanic) (1997)
- I Salonisti The Last Dance Music for a Vanishing Era (1998)
- Bon Voyage! A Musical Journey Around The Americas (1999)
