= Barbara Weldens =

French singer-songwriter

Barbara Weldens (born Barbara Jacquinot, 17 April 1982 – 19 July 2017) was a French singer-songwriter. After releasing her first studio album, Le grand H de l'homme (Man with a capital H), in February 2017, she died on stage the following July while performing at a festival.

== Early life and career ==
Weldens was from Hérault and grew up in the circus, where she learned juggling, acrobatics and trapeze. She trained as a pianist at the conservatory in Sète, and earned a licence in musicology from the Paul Valéry University, Montpellier III in 2004. In 2015 she won the Tremplin Découverte Chanson de Pause Guitare and in 2016 the Pic d'Or de la Chanson at Tarbes, the young talent award at the 2016 Jacques Brel festival and the prix révélation scène of the Académie Charles-Cros.

Inspired by Jacques Brel, Weldens was a singer in the chanson réaliste tradition. She often performed in a trio with Barbara Hammadi on piano and Marion Diaques on violin. On 3 February 2017, with Hammadi and Diaques, she released her first studio album, Le grand H de l'homme (Man with a capital M); one reviewer wrote of it as "a coherent, profound, [and] powerful whole", and another spoke of the precision and balance of her lyrics.

== Death ==
Weldens was on tour and was performing in a church in the town of Gourdon in south-west France for the festival Léo Ferré when she collapsed on stage at about midnight on 19 July 2017 and was pronounced dead of cardiac arrest. She was 35. An autopsy confirmed that she had been electrocuted; she normally performed barefoot, and her foot made contact with a defective piece of electrical equipment.
