= Gaetano Bardini =

Italian opera singer

Gaetano Bardini (8 October 1926 – 3 November 2017) was an Italian tenor. Bardini gave numerous recitals and was a success in the Czech Republic, releasing his recording of his performances with the Prague Smetana, Brno State Opera, and Prague Chamber orchestras, with conductors Jan Štych and Ino Savini. He was born in Riparbella and died in Cecina at the age of 91.

== Discography ==
- 1967 - "Recital - Romanze d'opera" - Conductor: Ino Savini - Supraphon
- 1968 - Verdi - "Il Trovatore" - G.Bardini, Linda Vajna, Franco Pagliazzi - Czech Chorus and Praga Chamber Orchestra - Conductor: M° Ino Savini - F.lli Fabbri editor - Box with 33 RPM (first edition by Supraphon 1969 and two reissues by Fratelli Fabbri in 1969 and 1978)
- 1970 - "Recital - Romanze d'opera" - Conductor: Jan Stych - Supraphon 1 12 1158 G
- 1972 - Verdi - "Requiem" with Margaret Tynes, Vera Soukupova, Jan Kyzlink - live Prague Cathedral of Saint Vitus 9.9.72 Ostrava Symphony Orchestra Conductor: Ino Savini 2 CD
- 1973 - Mascagni - "Cavalleria Rusticana" - Santuzza: Marina Krilovici, Turiddu: Gaetano Bardini, Alfio: Kostas Paskalis, Mamma Lucia: Hilde Rössel-Majdan, Lola: Rohangiz Yachmi - Conductor:: Anton Guadagno - Vienna State Opera Chorus and Orchestra - Live Recording made 14 September 1973 - 2 CD
- 1973 - "Recital di canzoni napoletane" - Prague Opus (reissued in part by Champion Records - UK)
- 1979 - Mascagni - "Isabeau" - (Premiere) con Aldo Protti, Maria Chuang, Katia Angeloni, Filarmonica Janáček di Ostrava Dir: Jaromil Noheil
- 1979 - "Recital di Arie d'Opera" - Conductor: Jan Stych - Supraphon 1116 2729 G
