= The Tennors =

Jamaican rocksteady/reggae vocal group

- Origin: Kingston, Jamaica
- Genres: Reggae
- Label: Studio One Burning Sounds Secret Records
- Past members: Ronnie Davis, Nehemiah Davis, George Dekker, Howard Spencer, and Hilton Wilson

The Tennors is a Jamaican rocksteady and reggae vocal group in the 1960s and '70s. Among the band's hits was "Ride Yu Donkey" in 1968. The song was featured on the soundtrack to the 2005 film Broken Flowers.

== History ==
The Tennors were formed in Kingston, Jamaica in the mid-1960s by Albert George "Clive" Murphy, later known as "Clive Tennors." Murphy initially teamed up with Maurice "Professor" Johnson to create a duo called the Tennor Twins. Their breakthrough came in 1967 when they auditioned their song "Pressure and Slide" for arranger Jackie Mittoo of Studio One while sitting in the back of a taxicab. The song was recorded with Norman Davis joining as a trio, backed by Mittoo. "Pressure and Slide" became one of Jamaica's major hits in 1967, establishing The Tennors as a leading group in the burgeoning rocksteady scene.

Following their initial success, Murphy and Johnson founded their own record label to support their music and a roster of other artists. The tragic death of Johnson in a car accident left Murphy and Davis to carry on as a duo. They penned the song "Ride Yu Donkey," but after multiple rejections from producers, decided to record and release it themselves. The song became a massive hit in 1968. Other hits included "Cleopatra (I've Got to Get You Off My Mind)," "Grandpa," "Massi Massa," "Girl You Hold Me," "Rub Me Khaki," "Sufferer," "Sign of the Times," "Biff Baff" (aka "Traitor"), "Bow Legged Girl," "Little Things," "Cherry," and "Oh My Baby."

The group became a trio again with the addition of Ronnie Davis in 1968. Other notable members over the years included Nehemiah Davis, George Dekker, Howard Spencer, and Hilton Wilson. The Tennors also backed singer Jackie Bernard on "Another Scorcher" and moved further into reggae with "Reggae Girl" (also known as "Bow Legged Woman"), released under Trojan Records' Big Shot subsidiary in 1968. The Tennors were among the first groups to use the term "reggae" in a song title, contributing to the early development of the genre.

Under producer Sonia Pottinger, The Tennors recorded tracks like "Gee Whiz" and "Give Me Bread." In 1970, they collaborated with Duke Reid of Treasure Isle on the song "Hopeful Village," which won them the Best Performer title at that year's Jamaican Independence Song Festival. In 1973, they worked again with Reid on "Weather Report," an adaptation of Simon and Garfunkel's "The Only Living Boy in New York."

== Legacy and Revival ==
The Tennors disbanded in the mid-1970s. Murphy emigrated to the United States, pursuing a solo career under the name Clive Tennors. He released a solo album, Ride Yu Donkey, in 1990. Despite their hiatus, The Tennors' music endured, gaining renewed international attention when "Ride Yu Donkey" was featured in Jim Jarmusch's 2005 film Broken Flowers.

In March 2012, after nearly 35 years, The Tennors reunited with Clive Tennors, Ronnie Davis, and Howard Spencer. Sadly, Davis died in 2017, followed by Spencer's passing in 2021. Clive Tennors continued to lead the group, performing with new members such as Endell Major (formerly of Inner Circle) and Lincoln Cousins (formerly of The Clarendonians).

In 2019, Burning Sounds Records released new stereo recordings of The Tennors' early material, produced by reggae heavyweight Delroy Wilson. The collection featured sixteen classic tracks and included a booklet with an interview with Clive Tennors.

== Heineken Commercial Controversy ==
In 2018, The Tennors' song "Another Scorcher," written and produced by George "Clive" Murphy (aka Clive Tennors), was featured in a commercial for Heineken Light beer. The commercial depicted a bartender sliding a bottle of Heineken Light beer to a light-skinned woman, passing several men and women of color along the way. As the beer reached the woman, the tagline “Sometimes Lighter Is Better” appeared on the screen.

The advertisement sparked backlash, with viewers, including rapper Chance the Rapper, describing it as "terribly racist." Chance the Rapper questioned whether companies were deliberately producing controversial ads to generate attention, tweeting, “I think some companies are purposely putting out noticeably racist ads so they can get more views.”

In response to the controversy, Heineken removed the commercial from television and online platforms. The company issued a statement acknowledging that while the ad was intended to reference its light beer, it "missed the mark." Heineken further stated that it would use the feedback to influence future campaigns.

Despite the controversy, the inclusion of "Another Scorcher" in the commercial highlighted The Tennors' enduring influence on music and pop culture. The song, co-written and produced by Clive Tennors, remains one of the group's most recognized tracks. The Tennors, pioneers of the rocksteady genre, continue to perform internationally, including appearances at European festivals like the Folkestone Skabour in Kent, England.
