= 2017 in Japanese music =

The year 2017 in Japanese music.

== Events ==
- 68th NHK Kōhaku Uta Gassen

== Number-ones ==
- Oricon number-one albums
- Oricon number-one singles
- Hot 100 number-one singles

== Awards ==
- 59th Japan Record Awards
- 2017 MTV Video Music Awards Japan

== Albums released ==
=== January ===
Date	Album	Artist	Genre	Labels
1	Cream the Best	Cream	Hip hop	Rhythm Zone
6	The Best of Bōdan Shōnendan: Japan Edition	BTS	Hip hop	Pony Canyon
6	The Best of Bōdan Shōnendan: Korea Edition	BTS	Hip hop	Pony Canyon
6	Ballad Selection	KinKi Kids	J-pop	Johnny's Entertainment
11	Just Bring It	Band-Maid	Rock	Nippon Crown
11	Home	Daizystripper	Rock	Plug Records
11	DJCD "Kishō Taniyama no Mr.Tambourine Man: Taiki Bansei"	Kishō Taniyama	J-pop	Frontier Works
11	Drive-in Theater	Maaya Uchida	J-pop	Pony Canyon
11	Mrs. Green Apple	Mrs. Green Apple	Rock	EMI Records Japan
11	Ambitions	One Ok Rock	Rock	A-Sketch
11	Time of Your Life	Party Rockets GT	J-pop	Rocket Beats
11	Riemusic	Rie Murakawa	J-pop	Nippon Columbia
18	Freedom	Bradio	Rock	Hero Music Entertainment
18	E.G. Crazy	E-girls	J-pop	Rhythm Zone
18	Uchū	Han Seung-yeon	Pop	Sony Music Entertainment Japan
18	Chubby Groove	Inaba/Salas	Pop rock, hard rock	Vermillion Records
18	Olive	Sky-Hi	Hip hop	Avex Trax
18	Taecyeon Special: Winter Hitori	Taecyeon	Pop	Epic Records Japan
18	We Are TPD	Tokyo Performance Doll	J-pop	Epic Records Japan
21	8piece	Nobuhiko Okamoto	J-pop	Lantis
24	All Singleeees: & New Beginning	Greeeen	Rock	Universal Music Japan
25	Recreation 4	Acid Black Cherry	Rock	Motorod
25	Thumbnail	AKB48	J-pop	King Records
25	Pink	Asako Toki	Jazz	Rhythm Zone
25	Fairy Castle	ClariS	J-pop	SME Records
25	Next Phase	Da-ice	J-pop	Universal Sigma
25	Nijiyōbi.	Eriko Matsui	J-pop	Tokuma Japan Communications
25	Myakuhaku	Mucc	Rock	Warner Music Japan
25	&DNA	Passepied	Pop rock	Warner Music Japan
25	The Kids	Suchmos	Rock	Space Shower Music
25	WagakkiBand 1st US Tour Shōgeki: Deep Impact	Wagakki Band	Rock	Avex Trax
25	Yours Forever	Yoonak & Sungje of Supernova	Pop	Yoshimoto R and C

=== February ===
Date	Album	Artist	Genre	Labels
1	Calendar no Koibito	Aina Kusuda	J-pop	VAP
1	Syndrome	Chihiro Onitsuka	Folk	Victor Entertainment
1	Uso to Bonnō	Kreva	Hip hop	Speedstar Records
1	V6 Enshin	Masaaki Endoh	Rock	Lantis
1	Jiden History of Tomorrow	Mayday	Rock	A-Sketch
1	Ijigen kara no Houkou	Ningen Isu	Rock	A-Sketch
1	ISM	Sphere	J-pop	Lantis
1	Unofficial	The Oral Cigarettes	Rock	A-Sketch
8	Pierrot Dancin''	Granrodeo	Rock	Lantis
8	One Voice	Kyuhyun	Pop	Avex Trax
8	Superman	Wednesday Campanella	Electronic	Warner Music Japan
8	Electric Island, Acoustic Sea	Tak Matsumoto & Daniel Ho	Rock	Vermillion Records
8	New	The Bawdies	Rock	Victor Entertainment
8	Smoky Rich	Toshinori Yonekura	R&B	Tokuma Japan Communications
8	Koi Repi Best	Yutaka Kobayashi	J-pop	Koisuru Records
8	Scapegoat	Takuto	J-pop, rock	Being
15	Made	Big Bang	Pop	YGEX
15	Shin Sekai	Hello Sleepwalkers	Rock	Victor Entertainment
15	5th Anniversary Best	Leo Ieiri	J-pop	Victor Entertainment
15	Smile	Mai Kuraki	R&B	Northern Music
15	Babe.	Mao Abe	J-pop	Pony Canyon
15	XXX Box	Outrage	Thrash metal	Universal Music Japan
15	Cinema Trip	Passpo	Rock	Platinum Passport
15	Scandal	Scandal	Rock	Epic Records Japan
15	re:Action	Sukima Switch	Rock, jazz	Ariola Japan
22	Re:STUPiD	BiS	Rock	Tsubasa Records
22	Splash World	miwa	J-pop	Sony Music Entertainment Japan
22	Shishamo 4	Shishamo	Rock	Good Creators Records
22	Five	Shinee	Pop	Universal Music Japan
22	Way of Glory	AAA	J-pop	Avex Trax
22	Opportunity	Kana Hanazawa	J-pop	Aniplex
22	Kakumei no Oka	SKE48	J-pop	Avex Trax
24	What's Twice?	Twice	Dance	Warner Music Japan

=== March ===
Date	Album	Artist	Genre	Labels
1	Naked	Hitomi Kaji	J-pop	Avex Trax
8	Change Your Pops	Ame no Parade	Rock	Speedstar
8	W Face: inside	Koda Kumi	J-pop, Hip hop, R&B	Rhythm Zone
8	W Face: outside	Koda Kumi	J-pop, Hip hop, R&B	Rhythm Zone
15	kitixxxgaia	Seiko Oomori	Folk punk, J-pop	Avex Trax
15	Mabataki	Yuki	J-pop	Epic Records Japan
21	20 Shūnen Request Best + Rare Tracks	Cocco	J-pop	Victor Entertainment
21	All Time Best Album the Fighting Man	Elephant Kashimashi	Rock	Universal Sigma
22	Love/Hate	Ai Shinozaki	J-pop	Sony Music Japan
22	Hit	Daichi Miura	Pop	Groove
22	Revolution [re:i]	Eri Kitamura	J-pop	TMS Music
22	Soul Renaissance	Gospellers	J-pop	Ki/oon Music
22	Musubine Ribbon Premium Box	Haruka Shimotsuki	J-pop	Team Entertainment
22	My Princess	Hōkago Princess	J-pop	Universal Music Japan
22	J 20th Anniversary Best album (1997–2017) W.U.M.F.	J	Rock	Onecircle
22	Tough	Mika Nakashima	J-pop	Sony Music Associated Records
22	Moumoon Best: Fullmoon	Moumoon	J-pop	Avex Trax
22	Neverland	NEWS	J-pop	Johnny's Entertainment
22	Reboot	Takuma Terashima	J-pop	Lantis
22	Emo	Towa Tei	Electronica	Imperial Records
22	Shikisai	Wagakki Band	Rock	Avex Trax
22	5	Yumemiru Adolescence	J-pop	Sony Music Associated Records
29	The JSB World	Sandaime J Soul Brothers	J-pop	Rhythm Zone
29	Gorilla	Pentagon	J-pop	Cube Entertainment Japan

=== April ===
Date	Album	Artist	Genre	Labels
5	Blue Ocean Fishing Cruise	Tsuri Bit	J-pop	Kisspoint Records
12	Utopia	Miliyah Kato	Dance-pop, J-pop	Mastersix Foundation
12	Love Honey	Ai Otsuka	J-pop, Electronic	Avex Trax
12	Kogen	Base Ball Bear	Alternative rock	EMI Records
26	Yuzu 20th Anniversary All Time Best Album Yuzu Iroha	Yuzu	J-pop	Senha & Co.
26	Natsumelo	Mito Natsume	J-pop, Pop rock, Alternative dance, post-disco	Sony Music Entertainment Japan
26	Love 2	Ayaka Hirahara	J-pop	EMI Records
26	Unlock	Naoya Urata	J-pop, R&B	Cutting Edge

=== May ===
Date	Album	Artist	Genre	Labels
3	Best Selection "blanc"	Aimer	J-pop	Sony Music Entertainment Japan
3	Best Selection "noir"	Aimer	J-pop	Sony Music Entertainment Japan
10	Unlimited Diffusion	Aldious	Heavy metal	Radiant A / Village Again Association
10	Tengoku Inkan o Kikinasai	Heavenstamp	Rock	Goldshoes Records
10	Daruma Ringo	Gesu no Kiwami Otome	Indie rock, Indie pop	Unborde
17	3	Tricot	Math rock	Bakuretsu Records
17	Netsugen	Cinema Staff	Alternative rock, Indie rock	Pony Canyon
24	Fantasy Club	tofubeats	Hip hop, House	Unborde
24	Umarete Kara Hajimete Mita Yume	Nogizaka46	J-pop	Sony Music Entertainment Japan
24	Little Devil Parade	LiSA	J-pop, Rock	Sacra Music

=== June ===
Date	Album	Artist	Genre	Labels
7	Wa to Yo	Ai	R&B	EMI Records
28	#Twice	Twice	J-pop, Pop	Warner Music Japan

=== August ===
Date	Album	Artist	Genre	Labels
9	Parade	Deen	J-pop	Epic Records Japan
16	Sodefuri Au mo Tashou no En	Chicago Poodle	J-pop	Giza Studio

=== September ===
Date	Album	Artist	Genre	Labels
6	Naked	Kang In-soo	J-pop	Universal Music Japan

=== October ===
Date	Album	Artist	Genre	Labels
4	Re: Dream	Dream Ami	J-pop	Rhythm Zone
11	Fateless	Coldrain	Metalcore	Warner Music Japan
18	Untitled	Arashi	J-pop, wa, electronic, classical, hip hop	J Storm
18	Stay Gold	CNBLUE	Pop rock	Warner Music Japan
25	Awakening from Abyss	Lovebites	Heavy metal	Victor Entertainment

=== November ===
Date	Album	Artist	Genre	Labels
2	He(r)art	For Tracy Hyde	Dream pop	P-vine Records
29	Dinosaur	B'z	Hard rock, pop rock	Vermillion Records

=== December ===
Date	Album	Artist	Genre	Labels
6	15 Thank You, Too	Morning Musume	J-pop, electronica, EDM, dance-pop	Zetima
13	Sensational Feeling Nine	SF9	J-pop	Warner Music Japan
20	Luv	Luna Sea	Alternative rock, progressive rock	Universal

== Debuting ==
=== Debuting groups ===
- =Love
- 100%
- 22/7
- Atarashii Gakko!
- Blackpink
- Brats
- Cellchrome
- Chō Tokimeki Sendenbu
- CY8ER
- Cynhn
- Dimlim
- Exo-CBX
- Faky
- Last Idol
- Leetspeak Monsters
- Lovebites
- Mellow Mellow
- Migma Shelter
- Monsta X
- NCT 127
- NGT48
- Novelbright
- Pentagon
- Pink Babies
- Pink Cres.
- Polkadot Stingray
- Qumali Depart
- Qyoto
- Ryokuoushoku Shakai
- SF9
- The Rampage from Exile Tribe
- Roselia
- SudannaYuzuYully
- TRCNG
- Twice
- Ukka
- Up10tion
- Winner
- Yorushika

=== Debuting soloists ===
- Adieu
- Asca
- Beverly
- Haru Nemuri
- Hiroomi Tosaka
- Junna
- Keina Suda
- Masaki Suda
- Nao Tōyama
- Rena Nōnen
- Sayuri
- Shiina Natsukawa
- Shuta Sueyoshi
- Sōma Saitō
- Taecyeon
- Tao Tsuchiya

== Artists resuming activities ==
- Chemistry
- Megumi Nakajima
- Makidai
- Gesu no Kiwami Otome
- Indigo la End
- Aoi Yūki

== Artists on hiatus ==
- Ikimono-gakari
- Tsubaki
- YuiKaori
- Ami Wajima
- Tsuki Amano
- Pour Lui
- Tackey & Tsubasa
- Sphere
- Vamps
- Flumpool
- Cyntia
- Mejibray

== Retiring artists ==
- Nanami Hashimoto
- Sayaka Shionoya
- Momoko Tsugunaga
- Ray
- Himeka Nakamoto
- Mai Endo
- Haruka Shimada
- Shuuka Fujii

== Disbanding artists ==
- Doll Elements
- Especia
- Prizmmy
- Rev. from DVL
- White Ash
- C-ute
- Mimi Meme Mimi
- Plenty
- Reol
- Megamasso
- Hilcrhyme
- Musubizm
- Cibo Matto
- Sug
- High4
- Wonder Girls

== Deaths ==
- February 8 – Rina Matsuno, 18, idol singer and model, heart arrhythmia
- February 25 – Toshio Nakanishi, 61, musician and producer, esophageal cancer
- March 1 – Hiroshi Kamayatsu, 78, singer and guitarist, pancreatic cancer
- April 12 – Peggy Hayama, 83, singer, pneumonia
- July 8 – Seiji Yokoyama, 82, composer, pneumonia
- December 2 – Norihiko Hashida, 72, folk singer-songwriter, parkinson's disease

== See also ==
- 2017 in Japan
- 2017 in Japanese television
- List of Japanese films of 2017
