= 2017 in Japan =

- Decades: 1990s; 2000s; 2010s; 2020s; 2030s
- See also: Other events of 2017; History of Japan • Timeline • Years

The following is an overview of the year 2017 in Japan.

== Incumbents ==
- Emperor: Akihito
- Prime Minister: Shinzō Abe

=== Governors ===
- Aichi Prefecture: Hideaki Omura
- Akita Prefecture: Norihisa Satake
- Aomori Prefecture: Shingo Mimura
- Chiba Prefecture: Kensaku Morita
- Ehime Prefecture: Tokihiro Nakamura
- Fukui Prefecture: Issei Nishikawa
- Fukuoka Prefecture: Hiroshi Ogawa
- Fukushima Prefecture: Masao Uchibori
- Gifu Prefecture: Hajime Furuta
- Gunma Prefecture: Masaaki Osawa
- Hiroshima Prefecture: Hidehiko Yuzaki
- Hokkaido: Harumi Takahashi
- Hyogo Prefecture: Toshizō Ido
- Ibaraki Prefecture: Masaru Hashimoto (until 26 September); Kazuhiko Ōigawa (starting 26 September)
- Ishikawa Prefecture: Masanori Tanimoto
- Iwate Prefecture: Takuya Tasso
- Kagawa Prefecture: Keizō Hamada
- Kagoshima Prefecture: Satoshi Mitazono
- Kanagawa Prefecture: Yuji Kuroiwa
- Kochi: Masanao Ozaki
- Kumamoto Prefecture: Ikuo Kabashima
- Kyoto Prefecture: Keiji Yamada
- Mie Prefecture: Eikei Suzuki
- Miyagi Prefecture: Yoshihiro Murai
- Miyazaki Prefecture: Shunji Kōno
- Nagano Prefecture: Shuichi Abe
- Nagasaki Prefecture: Hōdō Nakamura
- Nara Prefecture: Shōgo Arai
- Niigata Prefecture: Ryūichi Yoneyama
- Oita Prefecture: Katsusada Hirose
- Okayama Prefecture: Ryuta Ibaragi
- Okinawa Prefecture: Takeshi Onaga
- Osaka Prefecture: Ichirō Matsui
- Saga Prefecture: Yoshinori Yamaguchi
- Saitama Prefecture: Kiyoshi Ueda
- Shiga Prefecture: Taizō Mikazuki
- Shiname Prefecture: Zenbe Mizoguchi
- Shizuoka Prefecture: Heita Kawakatsu
- Tochigi Prefecture: Tomikazu Fukuda
- Tokushima Prefecture: Kamon Iizumi
- Tokyo: Yuriko Koike
- Tottori Prefecture: Shinji Hirai
- Toyama Prefecture: Takakazu Ishii
- Wakayama Prefecture: Yoshinobu Nisaka
- Yamagata Prefecture: Mieko Yoshimura
- Yamaguchi Prefecture: Tsugumasa Muraoka
- Yamanashi Prefecture: Hitoshi Gotō

== Events ==
=== January ===
- January 22 – TonenGeneral refinery fire in Arida, Wakayama Prefecture, according to Fire and Disaster Management Angency confirmed report, no one injures in this incident.

=== March ===
- March 5 – A Bell 412 helicopter crashed into Mt Hachibuse in Nagano Prefecture, According to Japan Transport Ministry official announced, nine rescue workers fatalities.
- March 27 – According to National Police Agency of Japan officials, an avalanche occurred at the climbing course in Nasu Spa Family Sky place in Tochigi Prefecture. 8 people died and 40 more were wounded; most of the victims were high-school students.

=== April ===
- April 20 – According to Japan National Police Agency confirmed report, a 384 million-yen robbery incident in Tenjin area, Fukuoka, nine person detained in this case.

=== May ===
- May 2 – According to Japan Meteorological Agency confirmed report, a largest scale eruption, with 4000 meter-high in Sakurajima, Kagoshima Prefecture.

=== June ===
- June 1 – According to Japan National Police Agency confirmed report, eight person arrested for violating customs law, who brought the equivalent of about 200 kg of gold, about 8.2 million US dollars to the fishing port without permission in Karatsu, Saga Prefecture.

=== July ===
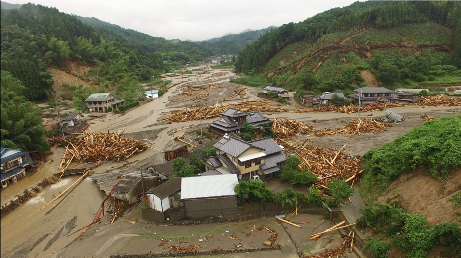
A debris flow caused by heavy rain in Asakura, Fukuoka Prefecture on 7 July 2017.

- July 5 – A heavy torrential rain, followed by a debris flow, hit Asakura, Fukuoka Prefecture and Hita, Oita Prefecture. According to an official of the Japan Fire and Disaster Management Agency, 36 people died, with 21 wounded.

=== October ===
- October 22 – 2017 Japanese general election elections were held.
- October 30 – Suspected serial killer Takahiro Shiraishi is arrested in Tokyo.

=== November ===
- November 1 – Shinzo Abe reappoints his government's cabinet ministers following his re-election as the Japanese prime minister.
- Emperor Akihito announces that he intends to retire on April 30, 2019.

=== December ===
- December 20 – Chen Shifeng was sentenced to 20 years in prison after the Jiang Ge Murder Case was solved.

== The Nobel Prize ==
- Kazuo Ishiguro: 2017 Nobel Prize in Literature winner.

== Arts and entertainment ==
- 2017 in anime
- 2017 in Japanese music
- 2017 in Japanese television
- List of 2017 box office number-one films in Japan
- List of Japanese films of 2017

== Sports ==
- October 8 – 2017 Formula One World Championship is held at 2017 Japanese Grand Prix
- October 15 – 2017 MotoGP World Championship is held at 2017 Japanese motorcycle Grand Prix
- 2017 F4 Japanese Championship
- 2017 Japanese Formula 3 Championship
- 2017 Super Formula Championship
- 2017 Super GT Series
- 2017 AFC Champions League Final (Japan)
- 2017 EAFF E-1 Football Championship (Japan)
- 2017 in Japanese football
- 2017 J1 League
- 2017 J2 League
- 2017 J3 League
- 2017 Japan Football League
- 2017 Japanese Regional Leagues
- 2017 Japanese Super Cup
- 2017 Emperor's Cup
- 2017 J.League Cup

== Deaths ==
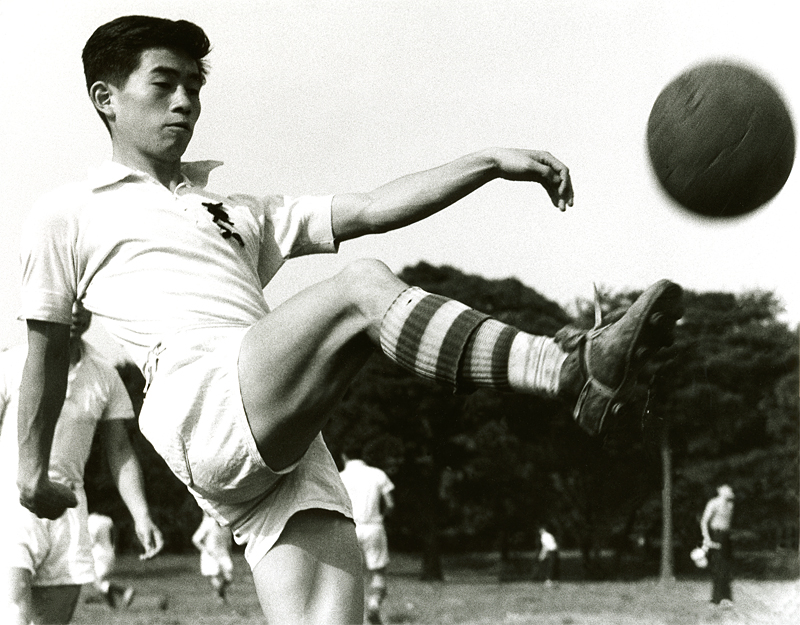
Shunichiro Okano

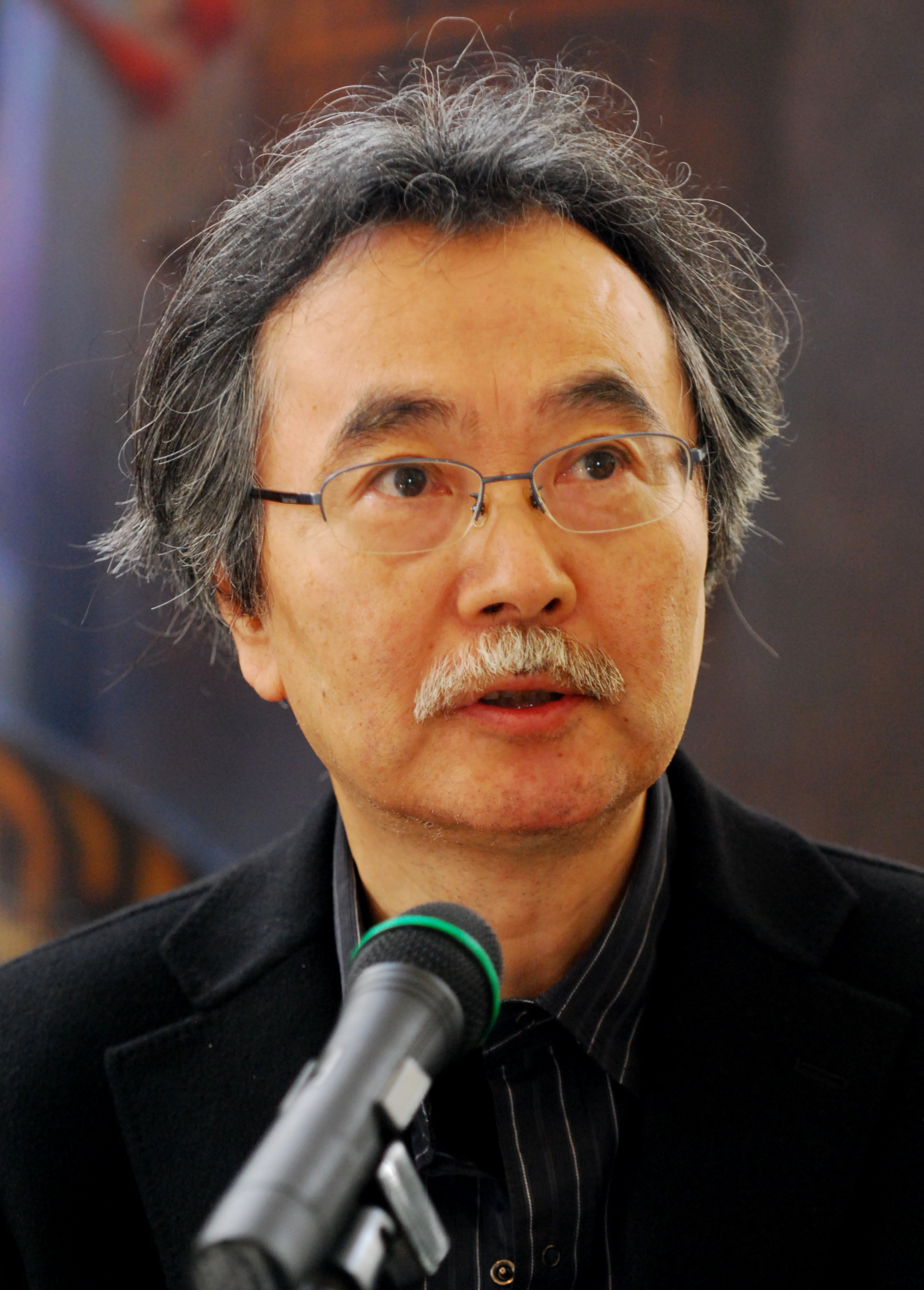
Jiro Taniguchi

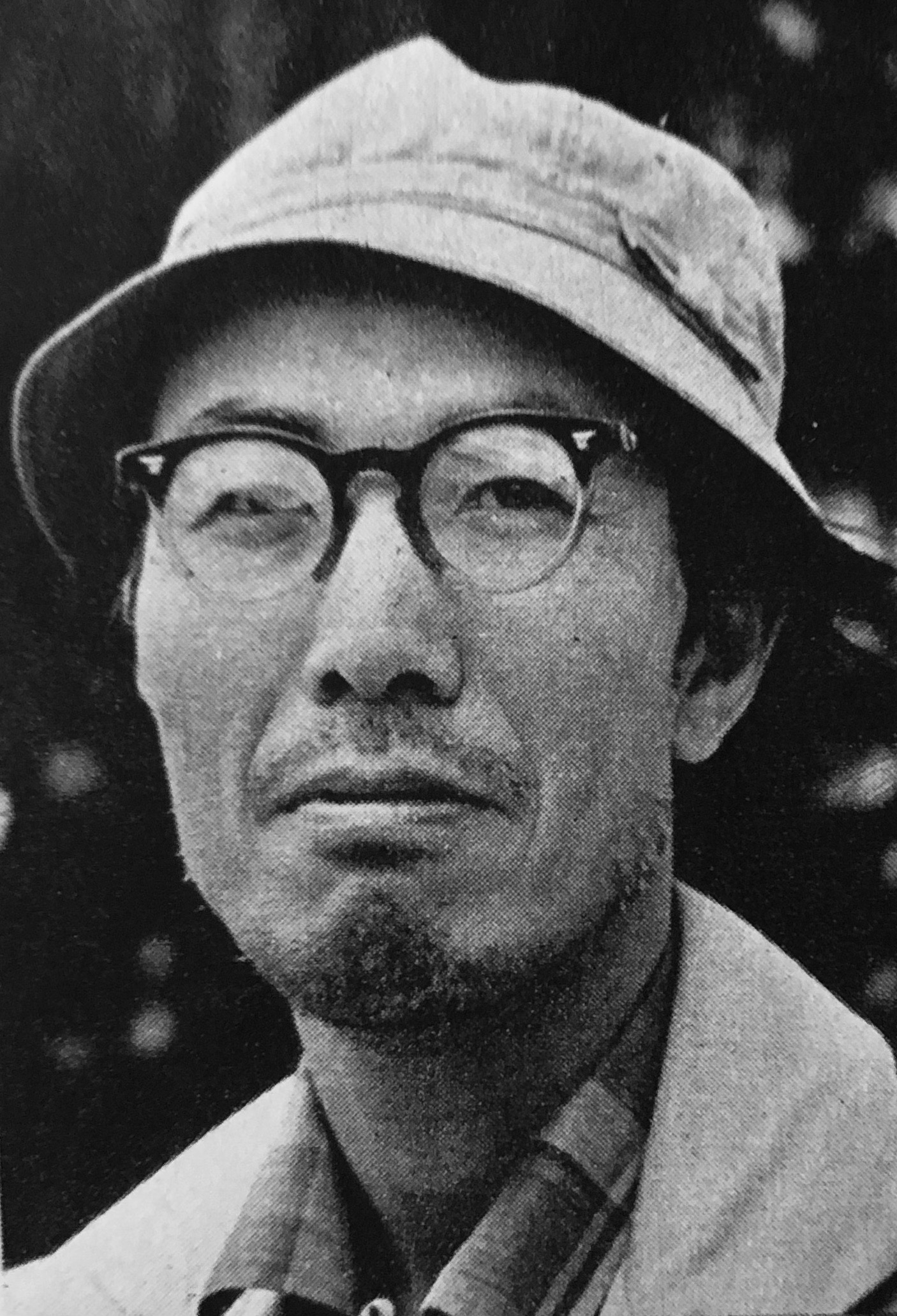
Seijun Suzuki

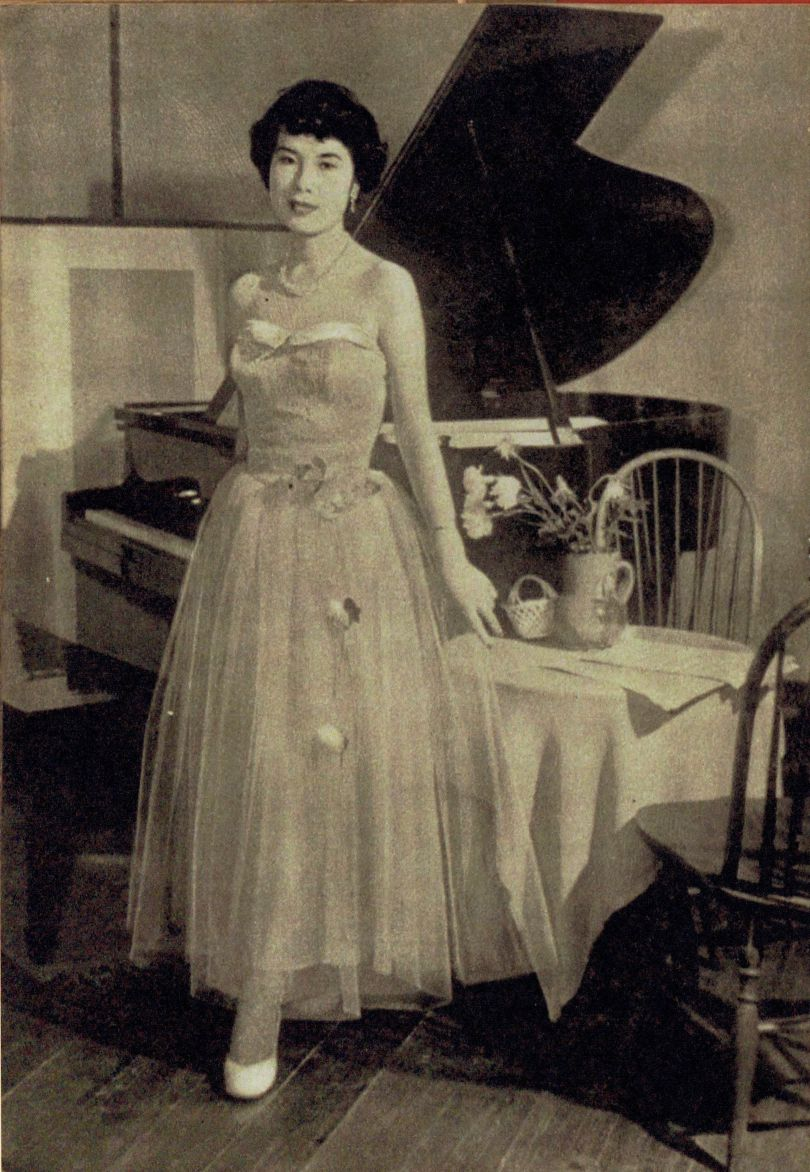
Peggy Hayama

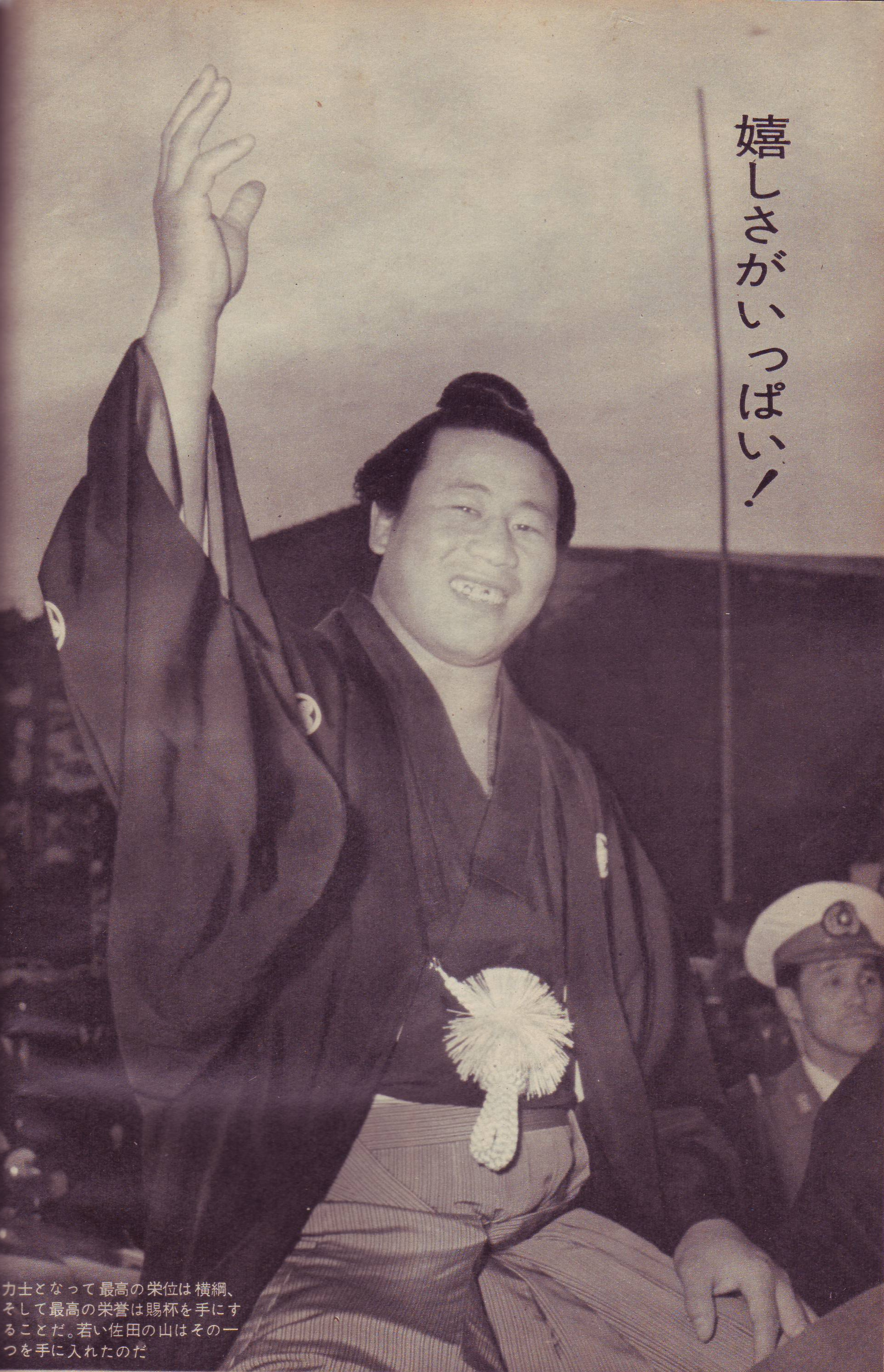
Sadanoyama Shinmatsu

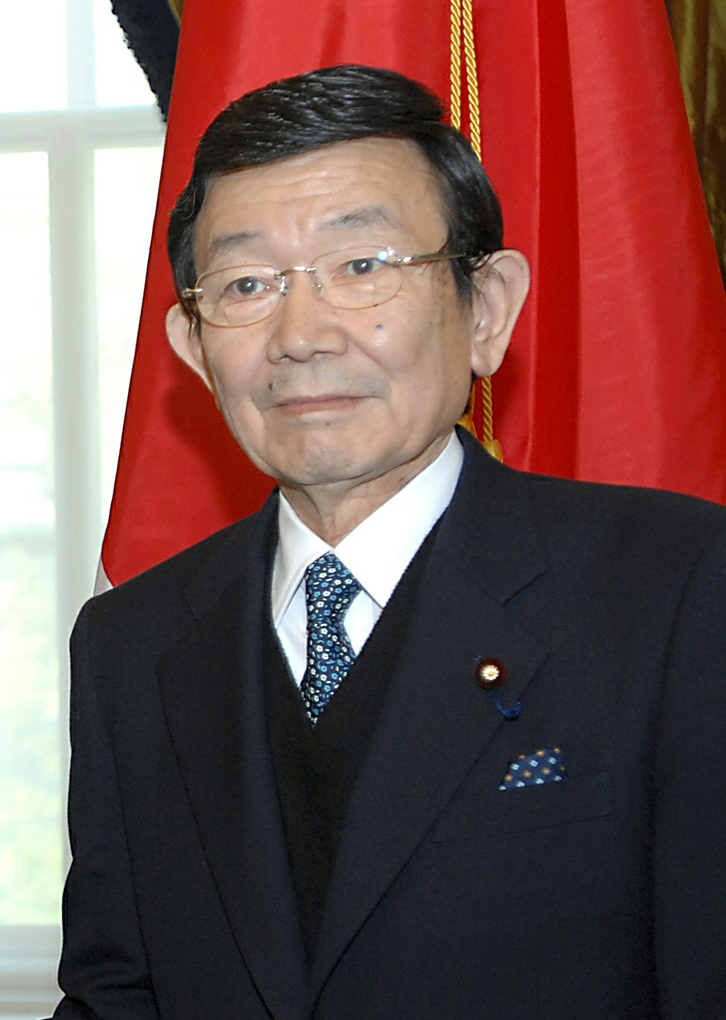
Kaoru Yosano

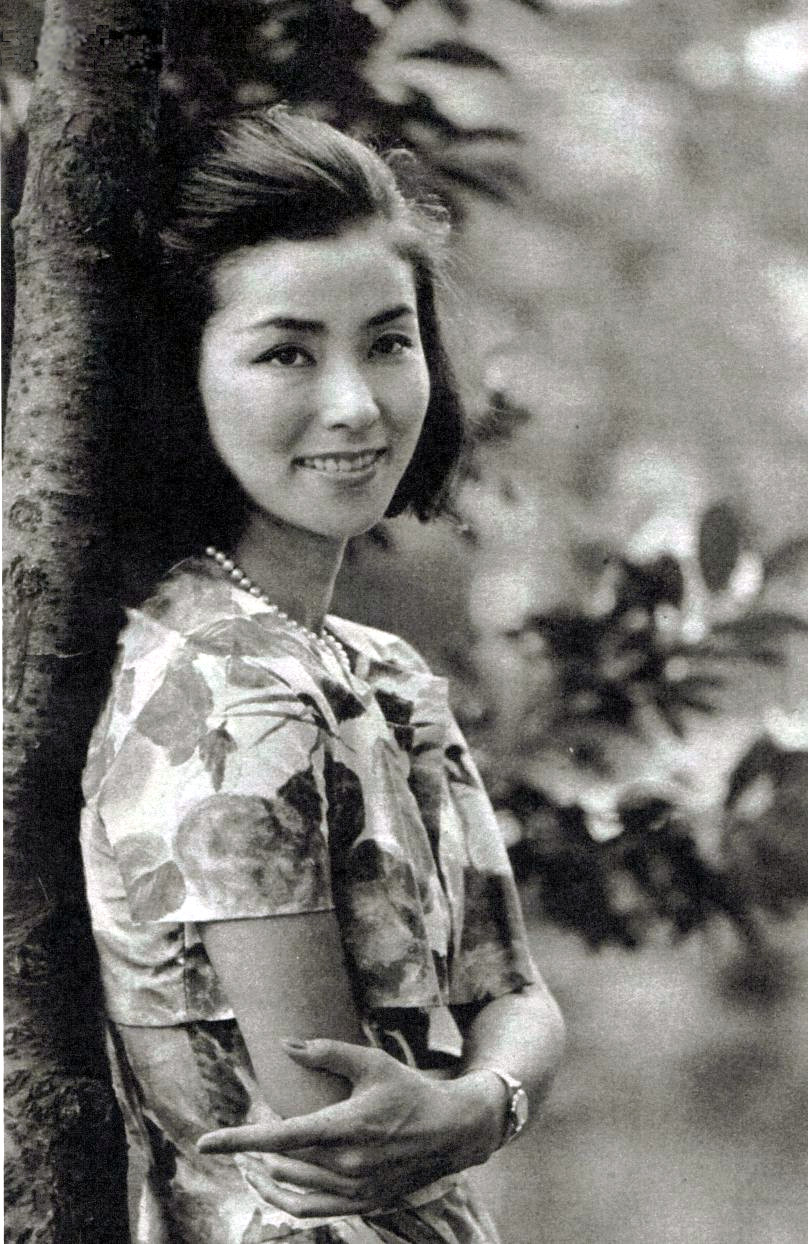
Yoko Nogiwa

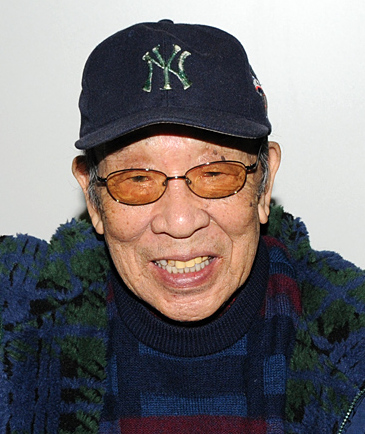
Haruo Nakajima

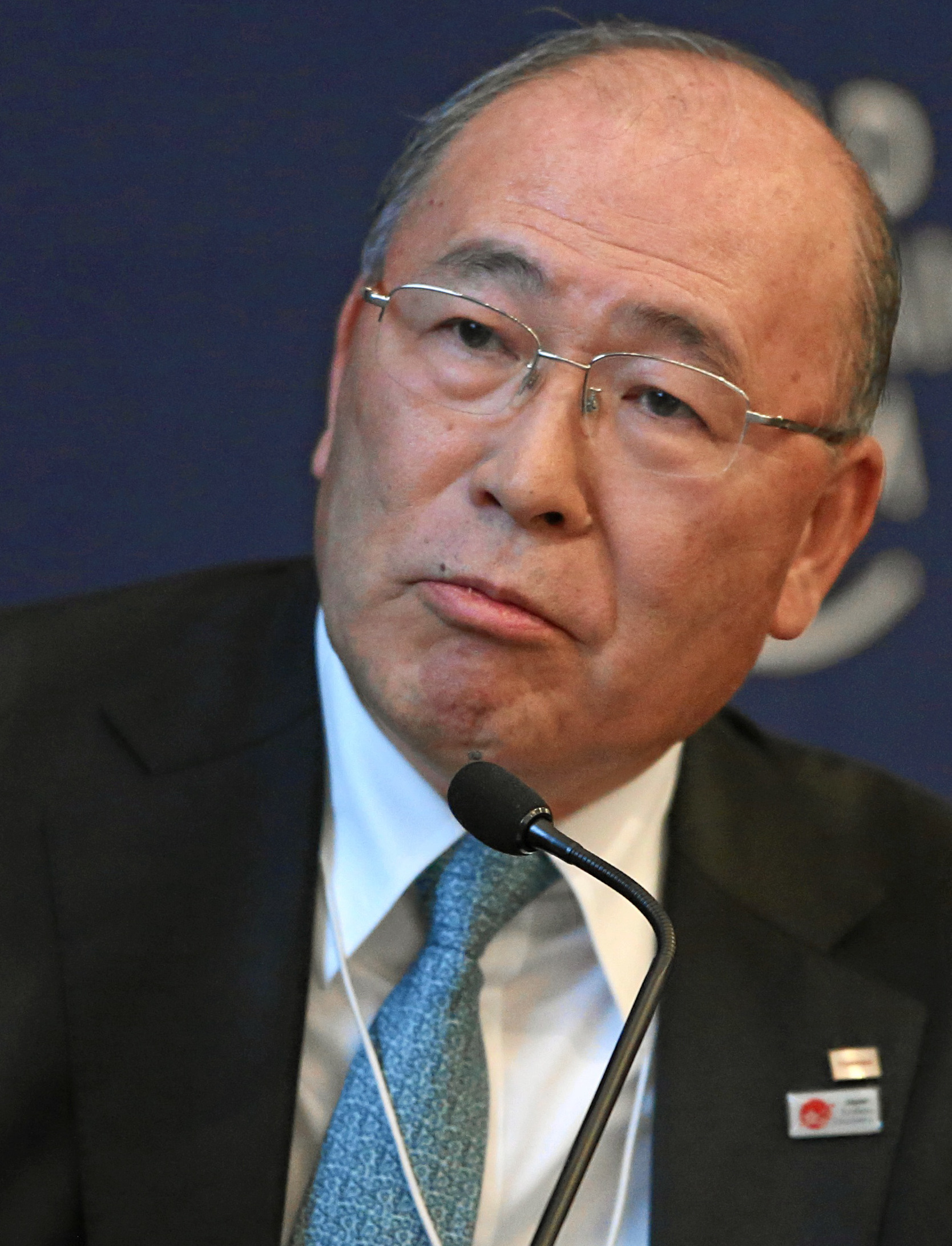
Atsutoshi Nishida

=== January ===
- January 3, Shigeru Kōyama, actor (b. 1929)
- January 6, Kosei Kamo, tennis player (b. 1932)
- January 15, Kozo Kinomoto, football player (b. 1949)
- January 17, Tokio Kano, politician (b. 1935)
- January 21, Hiroki Matsukata, actor (b. 1942)
- January 22, Masaya Nakamura, businessman (b. 1925)
- January 25, Shunji Fujimura, actor (b. 1934)

=== February ===
- February 2, Shunichiro Okano, football player (b. 1931)
- February 3
  - Shumon Miura, novelist (b. 1926)
  - Yoshiro Hayashi, politician (b. 1927)
- February 7, Miho Nakayama, comedian (b. 1938)
- February 8
  - Rina Matsuno, singer (b. 1998)
  - Yoshio Tsuchiya, actor (b. 1927)
- February 10, Tsuyoshi Yamanaka, swimmer (b. 1939)
- February 11, Jiro Taniguchi, manga artist (b. 1947)
- February 13, Seijun Suzuki, filmmaker (b. 1923)
- February 19, Kyoko Hayashi, author (b. 1930)
- February 24, Fumio Karashima, jazz pianist (b. 1948)
- February 25, Toshio Nakanishi, musician (b. 1956)

=== March ===
- March 1
  - Hiroshi Kamayatsu, musician (b. 1939)
  - Yasuyuki Kuwahara, football player (b. 1942)
- March 4, Takashi Inoue, actor (b. 1960)
- March 7
  - Yoshiyuki Arai, politician (b. 1934)
  - Yukinori Miyabe, speed skater (b. 1968)
- March 9, Kasugafuji Akihiro, sumo wrestler (b. 1966)
- March 13
  - Hiroto Muraoka, football player (b. 1931)
  - Morihiro Hashimoto, darts player (b. 1977)
- March 14, Tsunehiko Watase, actor (b. 1944)
- March 19, Tomiko Okazaki, politician (b. 1944)
- March 20, Shuntaro Hida, physician (b. 1917)
- March 22, Daisuke Satō, writer (b. 1964)

=== April ===
- April 1
  - Shigeaki Uno, political scientist (b. 1930)
  - Ikutaro Kakehashi, engineer, entrepreneur (b. 1930)
- April 5
  - Makoto Ōoka, poet (b. 1931)
  - Ryo Kagawa, folk singer (b. 1947)
- April 12
  - Toshio Matsumoto, film director (b. 1932)
  - Peggy Hayama, singer (b. 1933)
- April 13, Norio Shioyama, animator (b. 1940)
- April 17, Shōichi Watanabe, scholar (b. 1930)
- April 22
  - Hiroshi Nakai, politician (b. 1942)
  - Noritoshi Kanai, businessman (b. 1923)
- April 27, Sadanoyama Shinmatsu, sumo wrestler (b. 1938)

=== May ===
- May 3, Yumeji Tsukioka, actress (b. 1922)
- May 7, Yoshimitsu Banno, film director (b. 1931)
- May 10, Gaisi Takeuti, mathematician (b. 1926)
- May 15, Takeshi Kusaka, actor (b. 1931)
- May 18, Tatsuya Nōmi, actor (b. 1969)
- May 23, Kaoru Yosano, politician (b. 1938)

=== June ===
- June 6, Keiichi Tahara, photographer (b. 1951)
- June 12, Masahide Ōta, academic, politician (b. 1925)
- June 13, Yōko Nogiwa, actress (b. 1936)
- June 22, Mao Kobayashi, newscaster (b. 1982)
- June 23, Nobuyuki Ōuchi, shogi player (b. 1941)
- June 27, Ryoichi Jinnai, businessman (b. 1927)
- June 28, Shinji Mori, baseball player (b. 1974)

=== July ===
- July 4, Masatoshi Yoshino, geographer, climatologist (b. 1928)
- July 8, Seiji Yokoyama, musician (b. 1935)
- July 11, Keisuke Sagawa, actor (b. 1937)
- July 18, Shigeaki Hinohara, physician (b. 1911)
- July 24, Michiko Inukai, author, philanthropist (b. 1921)
- July 25, Tarō Kimura, politician (b. 1965)

=== August ===
- August 1, Shōgorō Nishimura, film director (b. 1930)
- August 3, Iwao Ōtani, recording engineer (b. 1919)
- August 7, Haruo Nakajima, actor (b. 1929)
- August 18, Tadayoshi Nagashima, politician (b. 1951)
- August 28, Tsutomu Hata, politician (b. 1935)
- August 30, Sumiteru Taniguchi, activist (b. 1929)

=== September ===
- September 7, Tsunenori Kawai, politician (b. 1937)
- September 8, Toshihiko Nakajima, actor (b. 1962)
- September 18, Kenji Watanabe, swimmer (b. 1969)
- September 25, Yoshitomo Tokugawa, photographer (b. 1950)
- September 29, Ryūji Saikachi, voice actor (b. 1928)

=== October ===
- October 4, Yosihiko H. Sinoto, anthropologist (b. 1924)
- October 11, Chikara Hashimoto, baseball player (b. 1933)
- October 16, Koichi Kishi, politician (b. 1940)
- October 18, Taizo Nishimuro, businessman (b. 1935)

=== November ===
- November 16, Hiromi Tsuru, voice actress (b. 1960)
- November 21, Masao Sugiuchi, go player (b. 1920)

=== December ===
- December 2, Norihiko Hashida, musician (b. 1945)
- December 8, Atsutoshi Nishida, businessman (b. 1943)
- December 9, Heitaro Nakajima, engineer (b. 1921)
- December 14, Tamio Ōki, voice actor (b. 1928)
- December 15, Michiru Shimada, screenwriter (b. 1959)
- December 20, Kenichi Yamamoto, engineer and businessman (b. 1922)
- December 21, Chu Ishikawa, composer (b. 1966)
- December 28, Junko Maya, actress (b. 1942)
- December 30
  - Tatsuro Toyoda, businessman (b. 1929)
  - Sansho Shinsui, actor (b. 1947)

== Elections ==
=== National ===
- October 22: By-elections to the National Diet; 2 vacancies as of July 31, both from the House of Representatives: Ehime 3rd district and Aomori 4th district

=== Prefectural ===
- January 22: Yamagata gubernatorial (w/o vote)
- January 29: Gifu gubernatorial
- March 26: Chiba gubernatorial
- April 9: Akita gubernatorial
- June 25: Shizuoka gubernatorial
- July 2: Tokyo legislative, Hyōgo gubernatorial
- August 27: Ibaraki gubernatorial
- October 22: Miyagi gubernatorial
- November 12: Hiroshima gubernatorial

=== Major municipal ===
Elections in the 20 designated major cities and the 23 special wards/"cities":

- January 29: Kitakyūshū, Fukuoka legislative
- February 5: Chiyoda, Tokyo mayoral
- March 26: Shizuoka, Shizuoka legislative
- April 23: Nagoya, Aichi mayoral
- May 21: Saitama, Saitama mayoral
- May 28: Chiba, Chiba mayoral
- July 23: Sendai, Miyagi mayoral
- July 30: Yokohama, Kanagawa mayoral
- September 24: Sakai, Osaka mayoral
- October 1: Okayama, Okayama mayoral
- October 22: Kawasaki, Kanagawa mayoral, Kōbe, Hyōgo mayoral
- before December 18/November 12 (ends of term; but both elections were held on the same day in 2013): Katsushika, Tokyo mayoral and legislative
