= Dream Ami discography =

- Studio albums: 1
- Singles: 7
- Music videos: 8

The discography of Japanese singer Ami Nakashima, better known as Dream Ami, consists of one studio album, seven singles (including one as featured artist), and eight music videos.

== Studio albums ==
List of albums, with selected chart positions
Title	Album details	Peak positions		Sales (Note: Sales provided by Oricon database and are rounded to the nearest thousand.)
Title	Album details	JPN Oricon	JPN Billboard (Note: Sources for chart positions are as follows: Re: Dream,)	Sales
Re: Dream	Released: October 4, 2017; Label: Rhythm Zone; Formats: CD, digital download	8	6	JPN: 13,000

== Singles ==
=== As lead artist ===
List of singles, with selected chart positions and certifications
Title	Year	Peak chart positions		Sales	Certifications	Album
Title	Year	JPN Oricon	JPN Hot (Note: Sources for chart positions are as follows: "Dress wo Nuida Cinderella", "Positive", "Try Everything", "Lovefool (Sukidatte Itte)", "Hayaku Aitai", "Kimi no Tonari", "Amaharu",)	Sales	Certifications	Album
"Dress wo Nuida Cinderella"	2015	5	7	JPN: 37,000		Re: Dream
"Try Everything"	2016	6	6	JPN: 25,000	RIAJ (digital): Gold	Re: Dream
"Lovefool (Sukidatte Itte)"	2016	9	9	JPN: 16,000		Re: Dream
"Hayaku Aitai"	2017	7	7	JPN: 16,000		Re: Dream
"Kimi no Tonari"	2017	5	15	JPN: 12,000		Re: Dream
"Amaharu"	2018	12	33	JPN: 7,000		TBA
"NEXT"	2018	—	—			TBA
"Wonderland"	2018	27	—	JPN: 3,000		TBA
"Good Goodbye"	2019	36	—	JPN: 2,000		TBA
"Koi no Tsubomi"	2019	—	—			TBA
"Wonderful World"	2021	—	—			TBA
"Love & Laugh"	2023	—	—			TBA

=== As featured artist ===
List of singles, with selected chart positions
Title	Year	Peak positions	Album
Title	Year	JPN Hot	Album
"Positive" (tofubeats featuring Dream Ami)	2015	60	Positive

== Other appearances ==
Title	Year	Other artist(s)	Album
"Tsuioku no Heroine" (追憶のヒロイン; "The Heroine of Recollection")	2005	Aiko Kayo	Girl's Box: Best Hits Compilation Winter
"Free Free!!"	2013	Spicy Chocolate, Han-kun	Shibuya Ragga Sweet Collection 3
"Positive (Capsule Remix)"	2016	Tofubeats, Yasutaka Nakata	Positive Remixes
"Try Everything (Zoorasian Philharmonic Version)"	2016		Zootopia Original Soundtrack (Japan Edition)
"Kagayaku Mirai" (輝く未来; "Shining Future")	2017		Thank You Disney
"Precious Time"	2021		SPEED 25th Anniversary TRIBUTE ALBUM "SPEED SPIRITS"

== Music videos ==
Title	Year	Director
"Dress wo Nuida Cinderella"	2015	Shigeaki Kubo
"Try Everything"	2016	Hidenobu Tanabe
"Lovefool: Sukidatte Itte"	2016	Hidenobu Tanabe
"Hayaku Aitai"	2017	Hidenobu Tanabe
"Kimi no Tonari"	2017	Hidenobu Tanabe
"XOXO"	2017	Kenta Tanoue
"Re: Dream"	2017	Ayano Seki
"Amaharu"	2018	Ayano Seki
"Wonderland"	2018	Eri Sawatari
"NEXT"	2018	—
"Good Goodbye"	2019	Kevin Bao
"Koi no Tsubomi"	2019	—

== See also ==
- Dream discography
- E-girls discography
