= Kinomoto =

Kinomoto may refer to:

- Kinomoto, Shiga, a former town in Ika District, Shiga Prefecture, Japan
- Kinomoto Station, a railway station in Nagahama, Shiga, Japan

== People with the surname ==
- Kozo Kinomoto (木之本 興三, 1949–2017), Japanese footballer
- Minehiro Kinomoto (木ノ本 嶺浩, born 1989), Japanese actor

== Fictional characters ==
- Sakura Kinomoto (木之本 桜), protagonist of the manga series Cardcaptor Sakura
