= Shionoya =

Shionoya (written: 塩谷 or 塩ノ谷) is a Japanese surname. Notable people with the surname include:

- Ryu Shionoya (塩谷 立, born 1950), Japanese politician
- Sayaka Shionoya (塩ノ谷 早耶香, born 1994), Japanese singer
