= Kohana =

Kohana may refer to:

== People ==
- Kohana Aiuchi (相内 今華), Japanese idol and former member of Houkago Princess

== Characters ==
Given name:

- Kohana, a character from the series Kamen Rider Den-O
- Kohana, a character from the film Yoshiwara (1937 film)
- Kohana Aigasaki (愛ヶ咲 小花), a character from the series Magic-kyun! Renaissance
- Kohana Aose (青瀬 コハナ), a character from the series Police × Heroine Lovepatrina!

Surname:

- Rin Kohana (小花 鈴), a character from the manga series Seiyu's Life!

== Other uses ==
- Kohana (orca), a captive orca
- Kohana cat, a minor cat breed
