= Bleach: Brave Souls =

2015 video game

- Developer: KLabGames
- Publisher: KLabGames
- Composer: KLab Sound Team
- Series: Bleach
- Engine: Unity
- Platforms: Android; iOS; Microsoft Windows; PlayStation 4; Xbox One; Nintendo Switch
- Release: July 23, 2015: Android, iOS; JP: July 23, 2015; WW: January 14, 2016 Microsoft Windows; WW: August 17, 2020 PlayStation 4; WW: March 14, 2022 Xbox One; WW: June 27, 2024 Nintendo Switch; WW: July 11, 2024
- Genre: Beat 'em up
- Modes: Single-player, multiplayer

Bleach: Brave Souls is a free-to-play gacha mobile game developed and published by KLabGames. Set in the Bleach universe, it was released for Android and iOS in Japan in July 2015 and worldwide in January 2016. It was released for Microsoft Windows in August 2020 and for PlayStation 4 in March 2022. The game amassed 80 million downloads by August 2023. A version for Xbox One was released in June 2024. The game was also released for Nintendo Switch in July 2024.

== Development ==
A Japanese version was published on July 23, 2015, and an English-language version the following year on January 14.

== Gameplay ==
The game is a real-time, beat 'em up action game with role-playing elements, featuring modes such as story and coop (PvE) and PVP. The game is free-to-play with options to purchase in-game items to speed up one's progress.

It features hundreds of collectible characters which can be leveled up and used in combat. Bleach series creator Tite Kubo has designed images for several unique character versions for the game, including ones related to the official spinoff sequel Can't Fear Your Own World, a story which was also serialized in the game. Since 2018, the game also includes characters and storylines from the final arc of the Bleach manga, "Thousand-Year Blood War", which received an anime adaptation in 2022. The game features music from the J-pop band Hello Sleepwalkers.

== Reception ==
The game received relatively positive reviews. Wellplayed wrote: "For a free-to-download mobile game, Bleach: Brave Souls offers an impressive array of content that will keep you entertained for longer than it has any right to do". Digitally Downloaded concluded that "Brave Souls isn't the finest anime game out there, but I believe it can be. Even in its bumpy, jagged state, KLab has managed to boil the franchise down to its most appealing elements and turn an intimidating multi-hundred chapter mess into something newcomers can actually parse". One of those early reviews which offered a scale ranked the game as 4 out 5. The Gamer's Library reviewer, while noting that they enjoy the game and plan on playing it, cautioned that it is rather repetitive.
