= Yasumoto =

Yasumoto (kanji: 安元 or 安本) is a Japanese surname. Notable people with the surname include:

- Hiroki Yasumoto (安元 洋貴; born 1977), Japanese voice actor
