= Mimi Meme Mimi =

Japanese music unit

- Origin: Japan
- Genre: J-pop
- Years active: 2013–2017
- Label: Astro Voice
- Members: Yuki Takao (vocal, lyricist); Chamōi (illustrator)
- Website: www.mimimememimi.com

Mimi Meme Mimi (みみめめMIMI; stylized as mimimemeMIMI) is a music unit from Japan consists of Yuki Takao (vocals, lyricist) and Chamōi (illustrator). The unit debuted with song titled "Sentimental Love", a theme song for A Town Where You Live. The girls call themselves a "next generation audio visual unit" and offer a unique mixture of music and imagery. The unit name, "Mimi Meme Mimi", is thought under the wish that they wanted their songs to appeal their listener "From ears to eyes. From eyes to ears" (耳・目・目・耳, Mimi-Me-Me-Mimi).

On 18 July 2017, the group announced its disbandment following the group's September 2017 live "Mimi Meme Mimi Live 2017 ~Bon Voyage!~" (みみめめMIMI LIVE2017～Bon! Voyage!～) due to Yuki Takao's retirement from both singing and voice acting.

== Members ==
Yuki Takao (タカオユキ, Takao Yuki)
Yuki Takao born on June 30, 1990 at Hyōgo Prefecture. She is a female voice actor and singer-songwriter. Before debuting as Mimi Meme Mimi with Chamōi, she already started her career as songwriter, using the pseudonym Yuka (ユカ).

Chamōi (ちゃもーい)
Chamōi responsible for all visual illustration for the unit's songs. Her theme is pop, cute, and create a colorful digital illustrations. The origin of her name is taken from cry shouts from a Pokémon, "chamōi!"

== Discography ==
=== Singles ===
No.	Release date	Title	Package number		Peak Oricon Chart position
No.	Release date	Title	Limited Edition	Standard Edition	Peak Oricon Chart position
2013
1	August 14	"Sentimental Love" (センチメンタルラブ, Senchimentaru rabu)	AZZS-17	AZCS-2028	39
2014
2	January 6	"Shunkan Reality" (瞬間リアリティ, Shunkan riariti)	AZZS-19	AZCS-2030	54
3	May 28	"Sayonara Usotsuki" (サヨナラ嘘ツキ)	AZZS-23	AZCS-2035	46
2015
4	June 10	CANDY MAGIC	AZCS-2044 (Yuki Takao Edition); AZCS-2045 (Mimi Meme Mimi Edition)		28
5	November 17	"Tentekomai" (天手古舞)	AZNT-13 (Amazon.co.jp Limited Edition); AZNT-14 （Limited Edition）		
2016
Pending (Note: In Japan, it written as Haishin (配信; Delivery) meaning that the single has been not released as a CD yet and currently only available for download.)	January 29	"Cha Cha Cha" (チャチャチャ)	-		
Pending	February 23	"Chocolate Kakumei" (チョコレート革命, Chokorēto Kakumei)	-		
8	August 17	"Harehare Fanfare" (晴レ晴レファンファーレ)	AZZS-49 (Initial Edition); AZNT-30 (Venue Limited Edition)	AZCS-2054	37
"—" denotes releases that did not chart.

=== Albums ===
Release Date	Title	Peak Oricon chart position	Official Page
August 13, 2014	Meikyū Sentimental (迷宮センチメンタル)	37	http://www.mimimememimi.com/discography/迷宮センチメンタル
Tracklist
1. "Sentimental Love" (センチメンタルラブ, Senchimentaru Rabu); 2. "Sayonara Usotsuki" (サヨナラ嘘ツキ; "Goodbye Liar"); 3. "Oekaki" (お絵描き; "Drawing"); 4. "Middi" (ミッディ); 5. "Am I Ready?"; 6. "Shunkan Reality" (瞬間リアリティ, Shunkan Riariti; "Moment Reality"); 7. "Usagi Namida" (兎ナミダ, "Rabbit Tears"); 8. "Senkō Hanabi (album version)" (閃光ハナビ; "Flash Hanabi"); 9. Mr.Darling; 10. no name love song 11. SAY-YOU
October 12, 2016	Kimi no Heroine ni Naritakute (きみのヒロインになりたくて)	27	www.mimimememimi.com/discography/きみのヒロインになりたくて
Tracklist
1. Shiroi Tori (白い鳥); 2. Harebare Fanfare (晴レ晴レファンファーレ); 3. Bunko (ぶんこ); 4. Shōjo (少女); 5. Soutaisei Replica (相対性レプリカ) (Album version); 6. Cha Cha Cha (チャチャチャ); 7. Candy Magic; 8. 1 Meter (1メートル); 9. Tentekomai (天手古舞); 10. Chocolate Kakumei (チョコレート革命); 11. Takaramono (たからもの); 12. Aoi Tori (青い鳥)

=== Split albums ===
Release date	Title	Package number	Track
July 16, 2014	"Twilight Ocean: Shallie no Atelier ~Tasogare no Umi no Renkinjutsuhi~ Vocal Album (Twilight Ocean シャリーのアトリエ〜黄昏の海の錬金術士〜ボーカルアルバム)	GUSTCD-10018	07. SAY YOU
March 22, 2017	AKIBA'S COLLECTION	KICA-3267	02. "Rirai Mirai" (リライミライ)
