= Atsutoshi Nishida =

Japanese business executive (1943–2017)

- 西田厚聰
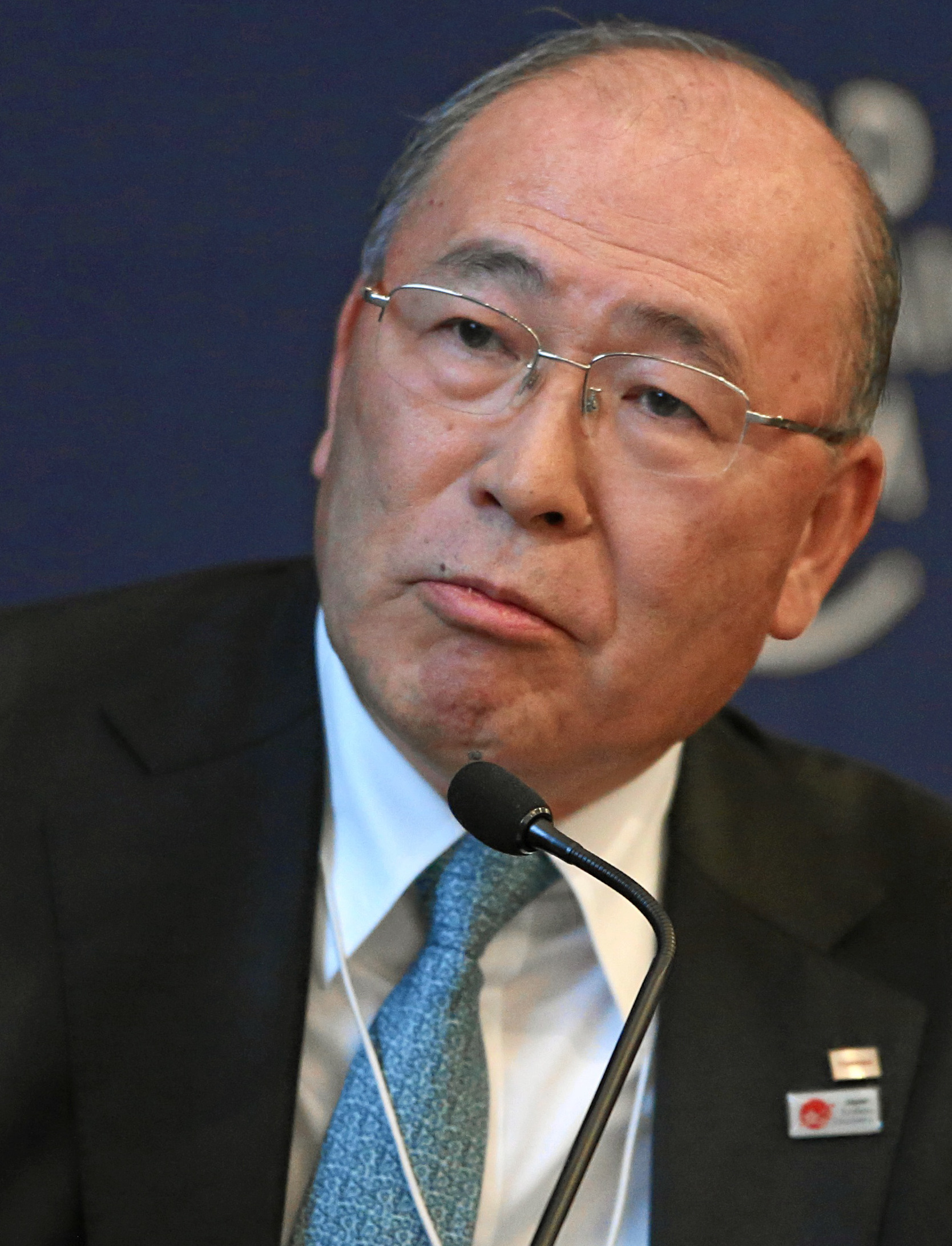
- Nishida at the World Economic Forum on 24 January 2013
- Born: 29 December 1943; Mie Prefecture
- Died: 8 December 2017 (aged 73); Shinagawa, Tokyo
- Education: Waseda University; University of Tokyo
- Years active: 1975–2015

Atsutoshi Nishida (西田 厚聰, Nishida Atsutoshi; 29 December 1943 – 8 December 2017) was a Japanese business executive.

== Early life ==
Born on 29 December 1943 in Mie Prefecture, Nishida earned a bachelor's degree from Waseda University and completed graduate work at the University of Tokyo. He married an Iranian woman shortly after concluding his studies in 1970.

== Career ==
Nishida was still based in Iran when he was first hired by Toshiba in 1975. Nishida pushed Toshiba to invest in and develop laptop computers in the 1980s, and by 1984 was named a general manager, responsible for personal computer sales at Toshiba Europe. The next year, Nishida's efforts resulted in the release of the Toshiba T1100. Nishida later returned to Japan and assumed increasing responsibility over Toshiba's laptop division.

Nishida was named president of Toshiba America Information Systems in April 1992, and left the post in 1995, only to return in 1997. During the early 2000s, he continued to take on senior management roles. Nishida became president of the company in 2005. During his tenure, Toshiba acquired the Westinghouse Electric Corporation in 2006 for US$5.4 billion and ended the development of the HD DVD in 2008. Nishida was succeeded by Norio Sasaki as president of Toshiba in 2009. Nishida became company chairman, a role he held until 2013.

In 2015, an investigation was launched into profit inflation that took place under company presidents Nishida, Sasaki and Hisao Tanaka. After the probe's findings were reported, Nishida left his position as adviser to the company. Subsequently, Toshiba sued Nishida, Sasaki, and Tanaka for US$28.2 million.

== Death ==
Nishida died of a heart attack at Toshiba General Hospital in Tokyo on 8 December 2017, aged 73.
