= Hello Sleepwalkers =

Rock band

- Also known as: Donguri Buster (どんぐりバスター)
- Origin: Okinawa, Japan
- Genres: Rock; alternative rock; progressive rock; experimental rock
- Years active: 2008–2018; 2021–present
- Label: A-Sketch (2011–2023)
- Members: Shuntaro; Narumi; Tasoko; Makoto
- Past members: Yuki
- Website: hellosleepwalkers.com

Hello Sleepwalkers (ハロー・スリープウォーカーズ) is a four-member Japanese alternative rock band from Okinawa formed in 2008. The band is signed to A-Sketch Music Label and have currently released seven studio albums, two extended plays, four single albums, and eighteen singles. They are best known for performing the opening theme song of the anime Noragami, "Goya no Machiawase" (午夜の待ち合わせ, Midnight's Appointment). In November 2018, the band announced their hiatus. The band resumed activity in September of 2021, after 12 years under A-Sketch, the band officially left the label on July 31, 2023, and transitioned into a fully independent act starting August 1, 2023.

== Members ==
Hello Sleepwalkers consists of:

- Shuntarō (シュンタロウ) — vocals, guitar, leader
- Narumi (ナルミ) — guitar, vocals
- Tasoko (タソコ) — guitar
- Makoto (マコト) — bass

Past members

- Yūki (ユウキ) — drums (2008–2023)

== Discography ==
=== Studio albums ===
Title	Album details	Peak chart positions
Title	Album details	JPN
Majiru Yoru: Nemuranai Wakusei (マジルヨル：ネムラナイワクセイ)	Released: January 18, 2012; Label: A-Sketch; Formats: CD, digital download; Track listing: 1. Goodnight At Midnight (ミッドナイトにグッドナイト); 2. Moon Gait (月面歩行); 3. Landmark Of Planet Q (惑星Qのランドマーク); 4. Sentimental Syndrome (センチメンタル症候群); 5. Cyclic Swimming (環状遊泳); 6. Five-Dimensional Girls Rear (五次元少女リア); 7. Are Sleeping (寝てる)	50
Masked Monkey Awakening	Released: February 19, 2014; Label: A-Sketch; Formats: CD, digital download; Track listing: 1. Where The Monkey Falls From The Trees (猿は木から何処へ落ちる); 2. Midnight's Appointment (午夜の待ち合わせ); 3. Bloody Mary; 4. Comic Relief; 5. Desert (砂漠); 6. Creation (天地創造); 7. 23; 8. Transboundary (越境); 9. Countdown; 10. Disk Flying (円盤飛来)	25
Liquid Soul and Solid Blood	Released: October 22, 2014; Label: A-Sketch; Formats: CD, digital download; Track listing: 1. Scandalous Prayer (百鬼夜行); 2. Worker Ant; 3. Achilles And Tortoise (アキレスと亀); 4. In The Morning The Two Of Us (朝に二人は); 5. Digi Bowie (デジボウイ); 6. Ray Of Sunlight	50
Planless Perfection	Released: March 23, 2016; Label: A-Sketch; Formats: CD, digital download; Track listing: 1. Rhetoric (レトリック); 2. Water Surface (水面); 3. Eyes To The Skies; 4. Mythology Collapse (神話崩壊); 5. Life Is A Game??; 6. How Does Hameln Blow A Whistle? (ハーメルンはどのようにして笛を吹くのか); 7. Breaking Dawn (夜明け); 8. Stand-Alone; 9. Jamming; 10. 2XXX; 11. Perfect Planner	38
Yumeyuu no Hate Yori (夢遊ノ果テヨリ)	Released: December 8, 2021; Label: A-Sketch; Formats: CD, digital download; Track listing: 1. SCAPEGOAT; 2. 20th Century Boys (20世紀少年); 3. Lies (虚言症); 4. Love Trouble (恋煩い); 5. Cyber Sea (電脳の海); 6. Past Pigments (過去の色素); 7. Fire (HSW Version)	63
PROJECT	Released: November 2, 2022; Label: A-Sketch; Formats: CD, digital download; Track listing: 1. Rurou Kitan (流浪奇譚); 2. Project (プロジェクト); 3. Twilight (トワイライト); 4. Seikatsu RHYTHM (生活RHYTHM); 5. Saishuu Heiki (最終兵器); 6. Aru Hoshi to Monologue (或る星とモノローグ); 7. Shuushi Kigou no Saki e (終止記号の先へ)	—
SingulaCity	Released: March 26, 2025; Label: A-Sketch; Formats: Digital download, streaming; Track listing: 1. Sekkai (切開); 2. Yureigai to Gyakusetsu (幽霊街と逆説); 3. Kuwadate (企て); 4. Kamen Butō (仮面舞踏); 5. Shussō (出走); 6. Shizuka no Umi (静かの海); 7. Sayonara City of lights (さよなら City of lights)	—

=== Extended plays ===
Title	Album details	Peak chart positions
Title	Album details	JPN
Shinsekai (シンセカイ)	Released: February 15, 2017; Label: A-Sketch; Formats: CD, digital download; Track listing: 1. New World (新世界); 2. Sleep Tight; 3. Rollin'; 4. Yah Yah Yah; 5. Sundown; 6. DNA Staircase (DNAの階段); 7. Solar Eclipse (日食)	27

=== Singles ===
Title	Year	Peak chart positions		Album
Title	Year	JPN Oricon	JPN Billboard	Album
"Disk Flying" (円盤飛来)	2012	96	—	Masked Monkey Awakening
"Midnight's Appointment" (午夜の待ち合わせ)	2014	27	30	Masked Monkey Awakening
"Alstroemeria"	2023	—	—	Non-album single
"Sekkai" (切開)	2024	—	—	SingulaCity
"Sayonara City of lights"	2025	—	—	SingulaCity
"—" denotes releases that did not chart.

== Filmography ==
=== Soundtrack appearances ===
Title	Year	Appearance
"Disk Flying" (円盤飛来)	2012	Space Shower TV Power Push!, June degree
"Midnight's Appointment" (午夜の待ち合わせ)	2014	UHF anime Noragami, opening theme
"Where The Monkey Falls From The Trees" (猿は木から何処へ落ちる)	2014	TBS Count Down TV, February's ending theme
"Ray Of Sunlight"	2014	Under Armour CM Song
"Scandalous Prayer" (百鬼夜行)	2014	Bleach: Brave Souls, smartphone application opening theme

=== Music videos ===
Year	Title	Director(s)
2011	"Sentimental Syndrome" (センチメンタル症候群)	Fukatsu Masakazu
2011	"Moon Gait" (月面歩行)	Fukatsu Masakazu
2012	"Disk Flying" (円盤飛来)	Fukatsu Masakazu
2014	"Midnight's Appointment" (午夜の待ち合わせ)	Kurōdo Furuya
2014	"Where The Monkey Falls From The Trees" (猿は木から何処へ落ちる)	Hideaki Fukui
2014	"Ray Of Sunlight"	Masatoshi Takizawa
2014	"Scandalous Prayer" (百鬼夜行)	Masatoshi Takizawa
2014	"Achilles And Tortoise" (アキレスと亀)	Watanabe Division
2016	"Mythology Collapse" (神話崩壊)	Yōhei Saitō
2016	"Breaking Dawn" (夜明け)	Yōhei Saitō
2016	"How Does Hameln Blow A Whistle?" (ハーメルンはどのようにして笛を吹くのか)	Watanabe Division
2017	"New World" (新世界)	Yōhei Saitō
2017	"Solar Eclipse" (日食)	Kazuaki Kimura
2021	"SCAPEGOAT"	Yōhei Saitō
2023	"Alstroemeria"	—
2024	"Sekkai" (切開)	—
2025	"Sayonara City of lights"	—
