= Takuto (singer) =

Japanese singer-songwriter

Takuto 焚吐
- Born: February 20, 1997 (age 29); Tokyo, Japan
- Genres: J-pop; Anison; rock
- Occupations: Musician; singer; songwriter; composer
- Instruments: Vocals; guitar
- Years active: 2015–2019
- Label: Being
- Website: takuto-official.com

YouTube information
- Channel: TAKUTO OFFICIAL YOUTUBE CHANNEL
- Years active: 2015 - 2020
- Subscribers: 53.6 thousand
- Views: 11 million
- Last updated: January 15, 2024

Takuto (焚吐) is a Japanese musician, singer, songwriter and composer under the Being label between years 2015-2019.

== Biography ==
=== 2015: The beginning of career ===
In his 4th year of elementary school he discovered his love for guitar. One year later, he started writing and composing songs by himself.

In 2012 he participated in an audition at Treasure Hunter ~Being 2012~ and won a special examination prize.

In December 2015 he made his debut and released his first single, "All Categorize", which was used as the ending theme song for the anime television series Young Black Jack.

=== 2016-2017: First One-Man Live ===
In April 2016, he released his second single, "Futari no Byoushin", which was used as the ending theme for the anime television series Detective Conan. With this song, he made his first TV appearance and performed on the Tokyo Broadcasting System Television music program Live B.

In July 2016 he held his first street-live performances, Real Life Capsule Vol.0 (リアルライブ・カプセルVol.0), in Shinjuku.

On 26 October 2016 Takuto released his first mini-album, Tokyo Chaos, which ranked #141 in its first week.

In November 2016 he continued with street-live performances Real Life Capsule Vol.1.

In January 2017 his new song "Yume Oi Hito" was used as the ending theme for the 4th season of anime television series Yamishibai. On 8 February 2017 Takuto released his full first studio album Scape Goat (スケープゴート).

In September 2017, Takuto held with the singer Miyakawa-kun the two-man tour "Kamikaze Express". The title was planned to be released as a duet single in February 2018.

In November 2017 as part of celebration for his second debut singer anniversary, Takuto held a one-man acoustic live tour "Kaiki to Kaishi".

=== 2018-2019: Duets with Miyakawa-kun ===
On 14 February 2018, Takuto released his first collaboration single "Kamikaze Express" with singer Miyakawakun. The song was used as an ending theme for the anime television series Detective Conan.

On 23 May 2019, Takuto released his second mini-album, Noroi ga Toketa Hi, which includes an album mix of a previously released collaboration single.

In July 2019, he released with Miyakawa-kun duet single under duet name Only this time Answer. After the appearance of Ongaku no Hi on the same month, the activities of Takuto has stopped.

== Discography ==
Takuto has released three singles, one mini-album and one studio album.

=== Singles ===
Title	Release date	Ranking
"All Categorize" (オールカテゴライズ)	2 December 2015	100
"Futari no Byoushin" (ふたりの秒針)	4 May 2016	47
"Jinsei wa Meijoushi gatai" (人生は名状し難い)	2 July 2016	200
"Kamikaze Express" (神風エクスプレス)	14 February 2018	16

=== Studio albums ===
Title	Release date	Ranking
Scapegoat (スケープゴート)	8 February 2017	125
Shininagara Ikitai (死にながら生きたい)	20 February 2019	54

=== EPs ===
Title	Release date	Ranking
Tokyo Chaos	26 October 2016	141
Noroi ga Toketa Hi	23 May 2018	38

== Live performances ==
- November 2015: Mitsubachi Fes 2015 in Tokyo
- May 2016: FM802 Funky Market
- June 2016: Sakae Sp-ring 2016
- July 2016: Real Life Capsule Vol.0
- October 2016: Minami Wheel 2016
- November 2016: Real Life Capsule Vol.1
- December 2016: Acoustic Live "Scapegoat"
- February–March 2017: Real Life Capsule Vol.2
- September 2017: Two Man Tour (with Miyakawa-kun) "Kamikaze Express"
- November 2017: One-man acoustic live "Kaiki to Kaishi"

== Anime soundtrack music ==
- "All Categorize" - ending theme for the anime television series Young Black Jack
- "Futari Byoushin" - ending theme for the anime television series Detective Conan
- "Yume Oi Hito" - ending theme for the 4th season of anime television series Yamishibai
- "Kamikaze Express" - ending theme for the anime television series Detective Conan
- "Answer" - opening theme for the anime television series Detective Conan
