= Scapegoat (album) =

Studio album by Takuto
- Released: February 8, 2017
- Recorded: 2015–2017
- Genre: J-pop, rock
- Length: 51 minutes
- Label: Being Inc.
- Producer: Takuto; Hisashi Kondou

Takuto chronology
Scapegoat (2017)	Shininagara Ikitai (2019)

Singles from Scapegoat
- 1. "All Categorize" Released: December 2, 2015; 2. "Futari no Byoushin" Released: May 4, 2016; 3. "Jinsei wa Meijoushi Katai" Released: July 22, 2016

Music video
- "焚吐1stアルバム「スケープゴート」全曲トレーラー" on YouTube

Scapegoat (スケープゴート) is the debut studio album by Japanese singer and songwriter Takuto. It was released on February 8, 2017, through the Being label.

== Background ==
The album includes the three previously released singles "All Categorize" (オールカテゴライズ), "Futari no Byoushin" (ふたりの秒針), and "Jinsei wa Meijoushi Katai" (人生は名状し難い).

The famous Vocaloid producer Neru was involved with the production of the album.

Scapegoat was released in two formats: a regular CD version (JBCZ-9050) and limited CD+DVD version. The DVD includes music videos (JBCZ-9049).

== Chart performance ==
The album charted for one week at number 125 on the Oricon charts.

== Track listing ==
All lyrics are written by Takuto (except track No.2, by Neru).

No.	Title	Music	Arrangers	Length
1.	"Hyper Rookie" (ハイパールーキー)	Takuto	Ryo Miyazaki	3:22
2.	"Boku wa Kimi no Agitator ja nai" (僕は君のアジテーターじゃない)	Neru	Neru	3:20
3.	"Kuroi Canvas" (黒いキャンバス)	Takuto	Yoshiaki Dewa	4:29
4.	"All Categorize" (オールカテゴライズ)	Takuto	Neru	2:59
5.	"Kimi ga Iin desu" (君がいいんです)	Taro Yabazaki	Taro Yabazaki	4:51
6.	"Futari no Byoushin" (ふたりの秒針)	Takuto	Kenichi Tachibai	4:27
7.	"Glimpse · Grandpa" (グリンプス・グランパ)	Takuto	Karasuya Sabou	4:29
8.	"Aoi Shissou" (青い疾走)	Takuto	Neru	3:54
9.	"Yume Oibito" (夢負い人)	Takuto	Yoshiaki Dewa	4:57
10.	"Climax" (クライマックス)	Takuto	Sasano Marii	4:06
11.	"Kanata no Ashita" (彼方の明日)	Takuto	Neru	6:01
12.	"Titi Loop" (ティティループ)	Takuto	Neru	4:02

== Use in media ==
- "All Categorize" – ending theme for anime television series Young Black Jack
- "Futari Byoushin" – ending theme for anime television series Detective Conan
- "Yume Oibito" – ending theme for the fourth season of anime television series Yamishibai
- "Hyper Rookie" – opening theme for the NHK FM Broadcast radio program "Music Line"
- "Climax" – ending theme for the Tokyo Broadcasting System Television program CDTV
