= Qumali Depart =

Japanese idol group

- Qumali Depart during the release event for their debut single in 2017

Background information
- Origin: Tokyo, Japan
- Genre: J-pop
- Years active: 2016–present
- Label: Ekoms
- Members: Ayane Oda; Fuuka Kaede; Mana Nanase; Mizuki Aoi; Shion Momo; Rin Suzune
- Past members: Risako Pai; Mitsuba Hina; Mei Yamano; Rikou Momosa; Niko Sao; Nako Yuu; Kanna Minami
- Website: www.qumalidepart.com

Qumali Depart (クマリデパート) is a Japanese girl group formed in 2016. They made their debut with the single, "Qumali Depart 1", in April 2017.

== History ==
Qumali Depart was formed on March 27, 2016. The group's starting line-up consisted of three members: Risako Pai, Niko Sao and Nako Yuu. They released their debut single, "Qumali Depart 1", on April 26, 2017.

They released their debut EP, Qumari Depart 2 , on April 11, 2018. On May 3, Risako Pai graduated from the group and three new members: Ayane Oda, Fuuka Kaede, and Mitsuba Hina, joined the group. On June 8, Mitsuba Hina left the group. On September 25, they released their second single, "Are? Romantic".

Their third single, "Shada Ikun", was released on January 22, 2019. They released their debut album, Kokodepa!, on May 28. Their fourth single, "Goku Love Jodo", was released on November 5.

They released their fifth single, "Sakura ni Nacchau yo!", on March 3, 2020. On February 28, two new members: Mana Nanase and Mei Yamano, joined the group. They made their live debut on July 23. Their sixth single, "Sun-byaku-6-ju Go! Nichicchi", was released on August 18.

On February 9, 2021, they released their second album, Sekadepa!. Their first double A-side single, "Genkai Mugendai Ken% / Furniture Girl" , was released on July 6.

They released three singles in 2022, the double A-side "Amida Fortune / Korekara", on January 18, "Shiawase Hasshin! From Kitchen" on May 31, and "Tomaranai! To Mannayo!" on October 25.

On January 31, 2023, they released their third album, Cosmo Depart. They released their third double A-side single, "Natsu e no Tobira / Budō Grape For You", on March 7, followed by "Mahō Shōjo Q" on June 27. Their second EP, Mini Depa 1, was released on November 21.

Mei Yamano graduated from the group on April 6, 2024. On April 27, two new members: Kanna Minami and Rikou Momosa, joined the group. They released the single, "Blue Survivor", on July 9.

Rikou Momosa left the group on January 21, 2025. They released their fourth album, Kanadepa!, on May 27. Niko Sao and Nako Yuu graduated from the group on July 2. On July 7, Kanna Minami graduated from the group. On July 20, three new members: Mizuki Aoi, Shion Momo, and Rin Suzune, joined the group.

== Members ==
Current

- Ayane Oda (小田アヤネ)
- Fuuka Kaede (楓フウカ)
- Mana Nanase (七瀬マナ)
- Mizuki Aoi (葵ミヅキ)
- Shion Momo (桃々シオン)
- Rin Suzune (鈴音リン)

Former

- Risako Pai (羽井リサコ)
- Mitsuba Hina (比奈ミツバ)
- Mei Yamano (山乃メイ)
- Rikou Momosa (百彩リコウ)
- Niko Sao (早桜ニコ)
- Nako Yuu (優雨ナコ)
- Kanna Minami (南カンナ)

== Discography ==
=== Studio albums ===
Title	Album details	Peak chart positions	
Title	Album details	Oricon	Billboard
Kokodepa! (ココデパ!)	Released: May 28, 2019; Label: Music@Note; Formats: CD, digital download	39	91
Sekadepa! (セカデパ!)	Released: February 9, 2021; Label: Music@Note; Formats: CD, digital download	11	17
Cosmo Depart (コスモデパート)	Released: January 31, 2023; Label: Music@Note; Formats: CD, digital download	23	25
Kanadepa! (かなでぱ!)	Released: May 27, 2025; Label: Depart Records; Formats: CD, digital download	19	—
Miradepa! (みらでぱ!)	Released: October 27, 2026; Label: Depart Records; Formats: CD, digital download	49	—

=== Extended plays ===
Title	Album details	Peak chart positions	
Title	Album details	Oricon	Billboard
Qumari Depart 2 (クマリデパート2)	Released: April 11, 2018; Label: Ekoms; Formats: CD, digital download	—	—
Mini Depa 1 (ミニデパ1)	Released: November 21, 2023; Label: Qumali Depart; Formats: CD, digital download	14	16

=== Singles ===
Title	Year	Peak chart positions	Album
Title	Year	Oricon	Album
"Qumari Depart 1" (クマリデパート1)	2017	—	Kokodepa!
"Are? Romantic" (あれ?ロマンチック)	2018	50	Kokodepa!
"Shada Ikun" (シャダーイクン)	2019	28	Kokodepa!
"Goku Love Jodo" (極LOVE浄土)	2019	23	Sekadepa!
"Sakura ni Nacchau yo!" (サクラになっちゃうよ!)	2020	32	Sekadepa!
"Sun-byaku-6-ju Go! Nichicchi" (SUN 百6じゅ～GO!日ッチ☆)	2020	13	Sekadepa!
"Genkai Mugendai Ken% / Furniture Girl" (限界無限大ケン%/Furniture Girl)	2021	9	Cosmo Depart
"Amida Fortune / Korekara" (あみだ☆ふぉーちゅーん/これから)	2022	11	Cosmo Depart
"Shiawase Hasshin! From Kitchen" (幸せハッシン!フロムキッチン)	2022	13	Cosmo Depart
"Tomaranai! To Mannayo!" (止まらない!ト・マンナヨ!)	2022	12	Cosmo Depart
"Natsu e no Tobira / Budō Grape For You" (夏へのとびら/ぶどう♡Grape♡For♡You♡)	2023	23	Kanadepa!
"Mahō Shōjo Q" (魔法少女Q)	2023	17	Kanadepa!
"Blue Survivor" (ブルーサバイバー)	2024	11	Kanadepa!
"Qumatta! Tsurarecyatta" (クマった!釣られちゃった■)	2026	8	TBA
"—" denotes releases that did not chart or were not released in that region.
