= Miho Nakayama (comedian) =

Japanese comedian (1938–2017)

- 中山 美保
- Born: Mihoko Ishida; 13 February 1938; Tokushima, Tokushima
- Died: 7 February 2017 (aged 78)
- Occupation: Comedian

Miho Nakayama (中山 美保, Nakayama Miho; 13 February 1938 – 7 February 2017) was a Japanese comedian. Her real name was Mihoko Ishida (石田 美保子, Ishida Mihoko).

Nakayama was born in Tokushima, Tokushima. She was represented with Yoshimoto Creative Agency in Osaka.
