= Shigeaki Uno =

Shigeaki Uno (宇野 重昭, Uno Shigeaki; October 28, 1930 – 1 April 2017) was a political scientist; Professor Emeritus of Seikei University; Honorary President and Professor Emeritus of University of Shimane. Majored in International Relations (Modern Chinese History, Study on Northeast Asian Region).

Shigeaki Uno was born in Kanazawa City, Ishikawa Prefecture; His wife, Mieko Uno is Educator and Professor Emeritus of Ferris University. Shigeki Uno, Political Scientist and Professor of Research Institute for Social Science, University of Tokyo is a son of Mr. & Mrs. Uno.

== Personal History ==
=== Education ===
- 1948: Graduated from Shirakawa Junior High School of Fukushima Prefecture
- 1949: Finished the 1st grade of the Matsue High School (old-education-system high school)
- 1953: Graduated from College of Arts and Sciences, University of Tokyo
- 1956: Finished his Master in International Relations, Department of Advanced Social Studies, Graduate School of Arts and Science, University of Tokyo
- 1960: Took credit for Doctor's Course in International Relations, Department of International Relations, Department of Advanced Social Studies, Graduate School of Arts and Science, University of Tokyo and left school.
- 1961–1964: Worked as an administrative officer at the Asian Affairs Bureau of the Foreign Ministry
- 1962; Completed Degree of Doctor of Sociology at University of Tokyo.
- 1964: Assistant Professor of Political Economic Science at Seikei University
- 1968: Professor of the Faculty of Law at Seikei University
- 1986–1988: President of the Japan Association of International Relations
- 1988–1990: Dean of the Faculty of Law at Seikei University
- 1994–2000: Member of the 16th and 17th terms of the Science Council of Japan
- 1995–1998: President of Seikei University
- 1998–2000: Board Chairperson of Seikei Gakuin (school judicial person)
- 1999: Professor Emeritus of Seikei University
- 2000–2007: President of University of Shimane
- 2007–2009: Board Chairperson and President of University of Shimane
- 2009: Honorary President and Honorary Professor of University of Shimane

== Achievements ==
=== The Way to the Pacific War ===
For some years from the time of Graduate School doctor's course to graduation, Uno carried out experimental study on the Pacific War at academic and cultural forum (i.e., “bull sessions” with many foreign attendees) under Toshio Ueda, the head of Oriental Political History Course, University of Tokyo, jointly with Masataka Banno (坂野 正高 Banno Masataka), Shinkichi Eto and Hiroharu Seki. Later Uno carried out a joint study with Chihiro Hosoya, Hiroharu Seki, Sadako Ogata and Takashi Saito. Since the analysis of the International Military Tribute for the Far East was different from facts, Uno and the team re-identified and re-examined facts to scrutinize experimental study on the process to the Pacific War. Uno and the team conducted a study on the Pacific War based on the public documents just disclosed in those days. Uno and the team discovered unexplored data and detailed data including even fliers related to China. They took social-scientific methods by examining the data and discussing issues in interpretations from diverse perspectives. As a result, the “ Japan Association of International Relations published an eminent study, “The way to the Pacific War” (The Asahi Shimbun Company, 1962–1963)

=== Study on the History of Chinese Communist Party and Mao Zedong ===
From the mid-1950s to the 1960s Uno also discovered data on Chinese Communist Party and edited vast volume of a collection of historical materials of the Chinese Communist Party in over 10 volumes together with the Japan Institute of International Affairs. At the same time while there is a question about what other possibilities were cut off from the official history of Chinese Communist Party by scholars of Chinese studies, Uno came up with a unique interpretation of the history of Chinese Communist Party by positioning it in the entire Chinese history. And as for Mao Zedong, Uno explored a new history of Chinese Communist Party by analyzing how the original data on Mao Zedong in those days was compiled in the context of the domestic environment and of international environment. Uno said the study on the history of Chinese Communist Party and the study on Mao Zedong were the most important case studies at a turning point in his own career.

=== Endogenous Development ===
In the wake of his participation in the experimental study on pollution issues of the Minamata disease along with Kazuko Tsurumi and other scholars, he embarked on a study on the Endogenous Development in the late 1960s. While conventional experimental study was based on written data, Uno thoroughly examined facts and substances before they were written for documentation and he discovered a direction, which he believes “should be thoroughly checked because “tradition does not exist as is; purely based on an interpretation a tradition is discovered and confirmed as a tradition and is given a meaning. The basis of the tradition per se should be thoroughly confirmed to check how it exists in people’s actual life and society.” In this way Uno has studied the process of a tradition evolving via extraneous stimulus and how heavier extraneous gravity becomes as the endogenous development [1]. Through this practice a sociological approach has been added to the conventional direction of international political science. At its heart Endogenous Development implies objections to modern high-growth economy or nation-centered politics by nature. “The leaders of “Endogenous Development should clearly indicate the values and scope they are aiming at. While Modernization Theory advocates ‘neutrality of values’, Endogenous Development demonstrates values explicitly" (Due to this nature such a bold problem presentation as “Genealogy of Endogenous Development ” by Kazuko Tsurumi was made).

This Endogenous Development later became related with experimental study by both Japan and China for a decade, by Fei Xiaotong a founder of Chinese social science and Kazuko Tsurumi's friend, along with Zhu Tonghua, the head of Study on Jiangsu Province, and the founder of Chinese social study; and a problem presentation was made as “Endogenous Development and Extraneous Development — Crossover in Modern China”.

=== The way to Study on Northeast Asia ===
2000: As its first president Uno founded a 4-year university, University of Shimane. Along with the opening of the post graduate school doctor's course, he created a new academic field, Northeast Asian Study. At that time he introduced a new basic concept or theory, Mutual Inspiration Theory he has developed for Endogenous Development, i.e. “while each factor is developing as a different factor, there is a sort of universal connections among them. While each one is developing as a different factor he wonders if new universal factors will be created when their mutual relations bump into each other. Vol.1 of the Series of the Northeast Asian Study Creation: “the Way to Northeast Asian Study” published in 2013 clearly explains the importance of “pathos,” which scientism conventionally tried to rule out or treated as something to be resolved by rational methods, and places importance on it as a basic standard of regional research. He emphasized “pathos” as if to balance out with scientism and clearly states it is required to prioritize the mutual relation between reason and pathos. Furthermore, Uno intentionally has not made any clear definition of the Northeast Asian region but presented a dynamic regional concept that as a result of the recent globalization a region changes by proactive mindsets of people living there. And an important operation for regional research is to correctly define reason and paths as the attributes of some region and to define their proper mutual relation. Uno is proposing multi-layered paradigm, i.e., to assign intelligence to handle the important operation for regional research. In regional research in the era of globalization, Northeast Asia Study indicates a model for proper multi-layered methods from now on (Kenichiro Hirano: “China 21 Vol.40.” a book review P253-P260)
