= Tsubaki (band) =

Japanese rock band

Tsubaki (つばき)
- Origin: Matsuyama City, Japan
- Genres: Alternative rock
- Years active: 2000–present
- Labels: R and C Ltd., Toy's Factory
- Members: Isshiki Noriyasu; Ogawa Hironaga; Okamoto Naoko
- Website: tsubaki-net.com

Tsubaki (つばき) is a Japanese rock band composed of three members.

== History ==
The band's name originated from the flower in the city of Matsuyama. The name was changed from Camellia to its current name Tsubaki in October 2002.

The band was formed in 2000 by frontman Isshiki Noriyasu when he went to Tokyo to study. Bassist Ogawa Hironaga joined next in March 2001, followed by Okamoto Naoko on drums, with its current lineup finalized in May 2002.

On 11 December 2010, the band announced on its website that guitarist-vocalist Isshiki Noriyasu had been diagnosed with a brain abnormality and would undergo surgery. All Tsubaki activities were cancelled and the band would be on hiatus till further notice.

== Band members ==
- Isshiki Noriyasu (一色徳保)
  - Vocalist, Guitarist, Main Songwriter
  - Birthdate: 11 September 1979
  - Hometown: Matsuyama City, Ehime Prefecture
- Ogawa Hironaga (小川博永)
  - Bassist
  - Birthdate: 4 February 1977
  - Hometown: Hino City, Tokyo
- Okamoto Naoko (岡本奈穂子)
  - Drummer
  - Birthdate: 18 April 1979
  - Hometown: Mihara City, Hiroshima Prefecture

== Discography ==
=== Indies ===
==== Demo tape ====
1. Tsubaki (椿)(20 September 2001)
  1. Tabiji (旅路)
  2. Kimi to Harukaze (君と春風)
  3. Ano Basho he (あの場所へ)
2. Tsubaki 1st demo(10 January 2001)
  1. Kimi to Harukaze (君と春風)
  2. Hachi Gatsu 八月

==== Singles ====
1. Mukougawa (向こう側)(4 December 2002)
  1. Kazamuki (風向き)
  2. Tokyo no Sora (東京の空)
  3. Toshishita (年下)
  4. Curtain (カーテン)
2. Kuru Asa Moeru Mirai (来る朝燃える未来)(8 October 2003)
  1. Kuru Asa Moeru Mirai (来る朝燃える未来)
  2. Mousouressha (妄想列車)
  3. Tsuki no Yoru ni Itsumonokawa (月の夜にいつもの川)
3. Ao (青)(4 February 2004)
  1. Ao (青)
  2. Akane Iro (茜色)
  3. Curtain (カーテン)
4. Katamichi Kippu/Hachi Gatsu (片道キップ／八月)(2 July 2004)
  1. Katamichi Kippu (片道キップ)
  2. Hachi Gatsu (八月)
5. Kyou mo Asa mo (今日も明日も)(29 April 2006)
  1. Kyou mo Asa mo (今日も明日も)

==== Album ====
1. Yoru to Asa no Sukima ni (夜と朝の隙間に)(9 April 2003) - Mini Album
  1. Loop (ループ)
  2. Kazamuki (風向き)
  3. Sokudo (速度)
  4. Yumemigachi (夢見がち)
  5. Sono Wake wa (その訳は)
  6. Fuyu no Hanashi (冬の話)
2. Ano Hi no Sora ni Kakato wo Narase (あの日の空に踵を鳴らせ)(2 July 2004)
  1. Kakato (踵)
  2. Ao (青)
  3. Amaoto (雨音)
  4. Yokaze ni Nosete (夜風に乗せて)
  5. Aserora (アセロラ)
  6. Atarashii Sekai (新しい世界)
  7. Aimai na Yoru (曖昧な夜)
  8. Kimi no Hige (君のヒゲ)
  9. Kanashii Tori (悲しい鳥)
  10. Neko (猫)
  11. Yuugure (夕暮れ)
  12. Sayonara (サヨナラ)
3. Best Early Collection 2002-2004(21 November 2007)
  1. Kazamuki (風向き)
  2. Tokyo no Sora (東京の空 )
  3. Toshishita (年下 )
  4. Loop (ループ)
  5. Fuyu no Hanashi (冬の話)
  6. Kuru Asa Moeru Mirai (来る朝燃える未来 )
  7. Mousouressha (妄想列車)
  8. Tsuki no Yoru ni itsumonokawa (月の夜にいつもの川)
  9. Ao (青)
  10. Katamichi Kippu (片道キップ)
  11. Amaoto (雨音)
  12. Yuugure (夕暮れ)
  13. Aimai na Yoru (Acoustic Version) (曖昧な夜(acoustic version))

=== Major ===
==== Single ====
1. Kino no Kaze (昨日の風)(23 February 2005)
  1. Kono no Kaze (昨日の風)
  2. Yume no Ato Saki (夢のあとさき)
  3. Kimagure (気まぐれ)
2. Mousugu (もうすぐ)(13 July 2005)
  1. Mousugu (もうすぐ)
  2. Machifuu (街風)
  3. Neko (猫/弾き語りヴァージョン)
3. Style (スタイル)(14 September 2005)
  1. Style (スタイル)
  2. Asayake (朝焼け)
  3. Yumemi Gachi Live at Matsuyama Salon Kitty (夢見がち～Live at 松山サロンキティ～)
4. Hanabi (花火)(8 February 2006)
  1. Hanabi (花火)
  2. Kokoro (ココロ)
  3. Unmei to Hana (運命と花)
5. Mabataki (瞬き)(26 July 2006)
  1. Mabataki (瞬き)
  2. Ima, Youbu Koe (今、呼ぶ声)
  3. Time Machine (タイムマシン)
6. Brown Sugar Hair (ブラウンシュガーヘア)(18 April 2007)
  1. Brown Sugar Hair (ブラウンシュガーヘア)
  2. Meisou (迷走)
7. 光～hikari～ (12 December 2008)
  1. 光～hikari～
  2. 光～hikari～ ( Akeboshi Piano Version )
  3. 光～hikari～ ( Akeboshi Remix )

==== Album ====
1. Yume Miru Machi made (夢見る街まで)(26 October 2005)
  1. Mousugu (もうすぐ)
  2. Memai (めまい)
  3. Kinou no Kaze (昨日の風)
  4. Doyou no gogo (土曜の午後)
  5. Yume Miru Machi (夢見る街)
  6. Style (スタイル)
  7. Houwajyoutai (飽和状態)
  8. Sanjuupun (30分)
  9. Mizuiro no Hane (水色の羽根)
  10. Kimagure (気まぐれ)
  11. Yotei nonai Nichiyou no Asa (予定のない日曜の朝)
2. Portrait+(23 May 2007)
  1. Nightbreak (ナイトブレイク)
  2. Brown Sugar Hair Album Version (ブラウンシュガーヘア(album ver.))
  3. Mayonaka Sanji no Shoutengai (真夜中3時の商店街)
  4. Butterfly (バタフライ)
  5. Akai Tobira (赤い扉 )
  6. Mabataki (瞬き(+Tak ver.))
  7. Gobutama
  8. Sekai no Owari to Boku no Uta (世界の終わりと僕の歌)
  9. Yume (夢)
  10. over
  11. Hanabi (花火)
3. Kakusei World (覚醒ワールド)(5 March 2008)
  1. Sameta Seikatsu (覚めた生活)
  2. Kanashimi no Naka kara hajimeyou (悲しみの中からはじめよう)
  3. Bourei Dance (亡霊ダンス)
  4. Aoi Tsuki (青い月)
  5. Sayonara, Usotsuki na Hutari (さよなら、嘘つきな二人)
  6. Borderless (ボーダレス)
  7. money&honey
  8. coffee
  9. Tablet (タブレット)
  10. Hane no Arika (羽の在処)
4. Ryuusei Note (流星ノート) (25 March 2009)
  1. Ginga Ressha (銀河列車)
  2. Ryuusei Dorobou (流星泥棒)
  3. Haru no Arashi (春の嵐)
  4. Hikari (光～hikari～)
  5. Yoru to Yume no Kodou (夜と夢の鼓動)
  6. Shiroi Machi no Hi (白い街の灯)
  7. Kasa (傘)
  8. Fukuramu Yume ni Bara no Toge (膨らむ夢に薔薇の棘)
  9. Nugisutete (脱ぎ捨てて)
  10. Kimi ga inakereba (君がいなければ)

=== DVD ===
1. Kakusei World Japan Tour Tour Final at Daikanyama 2008.4.5 (16 July 2008)
  1. Mabataki (瞬き)
  2. Bourei Dance (亡霊ダンス)
  3. Gobutama
  4. Style (スタイル)
  5. Tablet (タブレット)
  6. Hanabi (花火)
  7. Sayonara (サヨナラ)
  8. Borderless (ボーダレス)
  9. Sameta Seikatsu (覚めた生活)
  10. money&honey
  11. Mayonaka Sanji no Shoutengai (真夜中3時の商店街)
  12. Kanashimi no Naka kara hajimeyou (悲しみの中からはじめよう)
  13. Kimi no Hige (君のヒゲ)
  14. Kyou mo Asa mo (今日も明日も)
  15. Fuyu no Hanashi (冬の話 )

=== Compilation ===
1. Across the Sea: A Tribute to Weezer - Jamie
2. D Seldom
3. Seishun no Kaze Graduation Album (「青春の影」 卒業アルバム)
4. Radiohead Tribute - Master's Collection - Black Star

== Band score ==
1. Yume Miru Gai made (夢見る街まで)(25 November 2005)
