= Ryo Kagawa =

Ryō Kagawa

Background information
- Born: November 21, 1947; Hikone, Shiga, Japan
- Died: April 5, 2017 (aged 69) Tokyo, Japan
- Genres: Folk; folk rock
- Occupations: Singer-songwriter; musician
- Instruments: Vocals; guitar
- Years active: 1970–2017
- Website: http://www5f.biglobe.ne.jp/~twins/

Ryo Kagawa (加川 良, Kagawa Ryō; November 21, 1947 in Hikone, Japan – April 5, 2017 in Tokyo, Japan) was a Japanese folk singer and singer-songwriter. Kagawa was known as a central figure in the Kansai folk-music boom of the late 1960s and early 1970s in Japan, and was a key influence on the early musical development of such major Japanese artists as Tsuyoshi Nagabuchi.

== Life and career ==
Kagawa was born in Hikone, Shiga Prefecture in the Kansai region of Japan anchored by the major centers of Osaka, Kyoto, and Kobe. As a student at Kyoto Sangyo University, Kagawa was active in the school's popular music club, singing in Beatles and Rolling Stones cover bands. At the start of the 1970s, Kagawa was employed with Art Music Publishers, which handled copyright matters for the Underground Record Club (URC), a record label and distribution company that played a central role in the Kansai folk music boom of the late-1960s and early 1970s. While working with URC, Kagawa developed a relationship with prominent Kansai folk artist Wataru Takada, and, influenced by Takada and other artists such as Woody Guthrie, Ramblin' Jack Elliott, Hiroshi Iwai, Nobuyasu Okabayashi, and others, Kagawa began singing and composing folk himself. In 1970 he put in an unscheduled appearance at the 2nd Nakatsugawa Folk Jamboree, where he debuted the anti-war anthem "Kyokun I" ["Lesson I"] that catapulted him into folk's mainstream. "Kyokun I" would become Kagawa's signature song, and would go on to form the basis for "parody" tunes such as Kenichi Nagira's "Kyokun II" ["Lesson II"] and Kan Mikami's "Kyokun No. 110" ["Lesson No. 110"].

Kagawa made his official record debut from the URC label in 1971 with the release of his album Kyokun [Lessons], and would follow this with 1972's Shin'ai naru Q ni sasagu [Dedicated to My Dear Q] and the live album Yaa [Hey], which he recorded with Nakagawa Isato in 1973. In addition, folk superstar Takuro Yoshida's 1972 album Genki desu [I'm Fine] featured the song "Kagawa Ryo no tegami" ["A Letter From Kagawa Ryo"], which featured music by Yoshida and lyrics by Kagawa.

In 1974, Kagawa released the album Out of Mind through the Bellwood Records label (ja:ベルウッド・レコード). In 1975, he appeared in the musical Juugatsu ha tasogare no kuni [October, Land of Twilight], produced by musical theatre troupe Tokyo Kid Brothers, composing the music for the production and serving as its sound producer. The same year, he would participate in the recording of Nakagawa Isato's omnibus live album Hanauta to otsuki-san [Hummed Tunes and Mister Moon] with fellow artists Ito Takao, Otsuka Masaji, Kanamori Kosuke, Shiba, Nishioka Kyozo and Osada 'Taco' Kazuyoshi in Kobe. Kagawa would follow these projects with the albums Minami-yuki no haiuei [Southbound Highway], which he recorded in Memphis, Tennessee, in 1976, and Komazawa atari de [Somewhere Around Komazawa], which he recorded with rock band Lazy Hip in 1978. In the 1990s, Kagawa would go on to record more albums, including One (1991) and 2 (1993). Over a four-decade career, Kagawa's eclectic musical style incorporated elements of folk, rock, and pop; in an interview with the Asahi Newspaper in 2001, the artist expressed a hope that he "might find my own music by the time I reach 120 years of age or so."

In December, 2016, Kagawa was admitted to hospital for treatment of acute myelomonocytic leukemia. He was transferred to a hospital in Tokyo for further treatment in January 2017, but his condition would deteriorate suddenly in the evening of April 4. Ryo Kagawa died peacefully in hospital on the morning of April 5, 2017.

== Political stance ==
Despite the artist's roots in Japan's protest folk movement and the highly critical, anti-war sentiment underpinning his signature "Kyokun I," Kagawa claimed in published interviews to be largely ignorant of "politics." However, he also stated that he sensed an ongoing need for politically critical voices in contemporary Japan, and vowed in 2007 to continue performing "Kyokun I" "until I die." Kagawa urged anti-patriotism rather than blind faith in the state, and the lyrics of "Kyokun I" call for individuals to reject state demands to sacrifice oneself in war. Kagawa also noted with unease what he sees as a trend toward emphases on patriotism in Japan in recent years, and suggested that this is precisely the time at which anti-patriotic voices need to be heard. Nonetheless, he advocated a constructive approach that involves rewiring nationalism in order to build a country in which "everyone accepts one another, everyone is loved. That's what a truly 'beautiful country' means to me."

== Discography ==
- Kyokun [Lessons], URC Records, 1971
- Shin'ai naru Q ni sasagu [Dedicated to my dear Q], URC Records, 1972.
- Yaa [Hey], URC Records, 1973
- Out of Mind, Bellwood Records, 1974
- Juugatsu ha tasogare no kuni [October, Land of Twilight], produced in conjunction with musical troupe Tokyo Kid Brothers, Warner-Pioneer, 1975.
- Minami-yuki no haiuei [Southbound Highway], Teichiku/Black Records, 1976
- Komazawa atari de [Somewhere Around Komazawa], Teichiku/BlackRecords, 1978
- Maboroshi no Folk Live kessaku-shu [Best-Of Folk Live Performances Collection], Kagawa Ryo Live at the '71 Nakatsugawa Folk Jamboree, 1978.
- Propose, NEWS Records, 1981
- A LIVE, recorded under the name 'Kagawa Ryo with Murakami Ritsu', Bellwood Records, 1983
- ONE, Alfa Records, 1991
- 2[tu'], Japan Records, 1993
- R.O.C.K., recorded under the name 'Kagawa Ryo with TE-CHILI', UK Project Records, 1996
- USED, recorded under the name 'Kagawa Ryo with Sugino Yo', TWINS Records, 2002
- USED 2, recorded under the name 'Kagawa Ryo with Sugino Yo', TWINS Records, 2004
- USED END, recorded under the name 'Kagawa Ryo with Sugino Yo', TWINS Records, 2007
- 60roku-maru Debut/Kagawa Ryo, live DVD, TWINS Records, 2007

== Singles ==
- Kyokun i [Lesson I]/Zeni no kōyōryoku ni tsuite [On the Efficacy of Money], 1971
- Poketto no naka no ashita [Tomorrow in My Pocket]/Sono asa [That Morning], 1972
- Kōchi/Jō no barādo [The Ballad of Joe], 1976
- Onna no akashi [Proof of Womanhood]/Kimi ni oyasumi [Goodnight to You], 1978
- Cosmos/Nihonkai ga hirogatteiru [The Sea of Japan Stretches Before Me], 1981
- Gosuperu – Uso demo iikara [Gospel – Even a lie would be alright]/Tanjōbi [Birthday], 1981
