= Re: Dream =

Studio album by Dream Ami
- Released: October 4, 2017
- Recorded: 2015–17
- Genre: J-pop
- Length: 69:36
- Language: ja
- Label: Rhythm Zone
- Producer: Exile Hiro

Singles from Re: Dream
- 1. "Dress wo Nuida Cinderella" Released: July 29, 2015; 2. "Try Everything" Released: April 20, 2016; 3. "Lovefool (Sukidatte Itte)" Released: October 19, 2016; 4. "Hayaku Aitai" Released: March 22, 2017; 5. "Kimi no Tonari" Released: July 12, 2017

Re: Dream is the debut studio album by Japanese singer Dream Ami. It was released on October 4, 2017, by Rhythm Zone in several physical editions—a standalone CD, a regular and limited CD and DVD bundle, and a fanclub exclusive release for the CD/DVD bundle—and for digital consumption.

== Background and release ==
While active with Dream and E-girls, Ami released a series of singles between 2015 and 2017; after her final performance with E-girls in July 2016, she announced that those singles were included in an upcoming solo album, Re: Dream, to be released in October. She posted on Instagram that she was working on the lyrics for one of the album songs on July 19, and that she went to Sweden to complete the production and recording of the song on July 23.

On September 2, promotional photos and additional details about the album were released. Re: Dream was released in four different formats. The standalone CD consisted of seventeen tracks with four previously unreleased songs, including a cover version of E-girls' hit song "Follow Me". The music videos for the promotional recordings "XOXO" and "Re: Dream", unveiled on September 7 and 15, were featured in the bonus DVD of the CD/DVD edition alongside the music videos for the five singles of Re: Dream and a documentary movie. The limited edition came with a photobook titled Minuet and shot when Ami was in Sweden. First-press editions included promotional posters from her photoshoot in Sweden.

== Singles ==
Five singles were released from Re: Dream. "Dress wo Nuida Cinderella" was released as the first single from the album on July 29, 2015. The music video directed by Shigeaki Kubo was premiered on YouTube on June 10, 2015. It peaked at number five on the Oricon Singles Chart with 34,096 copies sold in its first week, making it the best selling physical single from Re: Dream.

"Try Everything" was released as the second single from the album on April 20, 2016, and pre-released digitally on April 15 for the Disney movie Zootopia. It peaked at number six on the Oricon chart and charted for a total of seventeen weeks, making it the longest charting single of the album. It reached the same peak position on Billboard Japan Hot 100 after six weeks on chart. The soundtrack version of the song was certified gold by the RIAJ for selling over 100,000 digital copies, making it the singer's most successful single from the album. The music video for the track was released on April 1, 2016, featuring Ami in the jungle surrounded by animals.

"Lovefool (Sukidatte Itte)" was released as the third single from the album on October 19, 2016. The song is a cover of the Cardigans' Lovefool and its accompanying music video was officially unveiled a month before the release. It is the lowest peaking single from Re: Dream, peaking at number nine on the Oricon chart. It reached the same peak position on Japan Hot 100.

"Hayaku Aitai" was released as the fourth single from the album on March 22, 2017. The official music video for the song premiered on February 23, 2017. It is the first single for which Ami has provided the lyrics and it was used as the theme song of the live-action movie Hirunaka no Ryuusei. It peaked at number seven on both the Oricon chart and Japan Hot 100. It also achieved high positions on digital and streaming charts at the time of its release, and was the most recent song that made it on Line Music's yearly top ten ranking of songs with the most daily number one.

"Kimi no Tonari" was released as the fifth and final single from the album on July 12, 2017. The single peaked at number five on the Oricon chart but is the lowest selling physical single from the album. It also marked Ami's fifth consecutive Oricon top-ten single since her debut. It peaked at number fifteen on Japan Hot 100. The accompanying music video was shot with a smartphone and features for the first time an actor other than Ami as her boyfriend.

=== Other songs ===
"XOXO" and the title track "Re: Dream" were used as promotional recordings for the album. Both songs received a music video which were uploaded to YouTube on September 5 and September 13 respectively, portraying two opposite moods.

== Promotion ==
A month before the album release, Ami took part in a concert event in Tokyo alongside other LDH artists where she performed "Re: Dream" for the first time, and several other songs from the album. She then promoted the album on music shows, starting with Fuji TV's Music Fair on September 30 where she performed the album's title track. During the week of the album release, she performed "Re: Dream" again on TBS' Count Down TV on October 7, and "Hayaku Aitai" on NHK's Shibuya Note on October 8. Additional media appearances included interviews about the album on local morning shows, radio shows and magazines throughout the months of September and October. To commemorate the album release, Ami hosted a live stream event on Line Live on October 7.

=== Concert tour ===
In mid July, Ami announced her first solo nationwide tour in support of the release of Re: Dream with a schedule of dates for November. The concert tour began on November 9 at the Zepp Sapporo in Hokkaido and concluded on November 29 at the Fukuoka Sunpalace concert hall, with a total of five shows in live houses, in five different cities in Japan. A footage of the concert at Zepp DiverCity Tokyo on November 21 was included in the DVD release of her sixth single "Amaharu", with a total of 21 songs added onto the tracklist.

==== Tour dates ====
Date	City	Country	Venue
November 9, 2017	Hokkaido	Japan	Zepp Sapporo
November 17, 2017	Osaka	Japan	Zepp Namba
November 21, 2017	Tokyo	Japan	Zepp DiverCity Tokyo
November 28, 2017	Aichi	Japan	Zepp Nagoya
November 29, 2017	Fukuoka	Japan	Fukuoka Sunpalace

== Track listing ==
CD / digital download
No.	Title	Lyrics	Music	Length
1.	"Hayaku Aitai" (はやく逢いたい; I Wanna See You Right Now)	Dream Ami	ArmySlick; Lauren Kaori	4:57
2.	"Re: Dream"	Ami; Jam9	Command Freaks; Lisa Desmond; Shikata	3:43
3.	"Try Everything" (トライ・エヴリシング Dream Ami version)	Sia Furler; Tor Erik Hermansen; Mikkel S. Eriksen	Furler; Hermansen; Eriksen	3:18
4.	"Can't Help Falling In Love (Aisazu ni Irarenai)" (愛さずにいられない; Elvis Presley cover)	Luigi Creatore; Hugo Peretti; George Weiss; Masato Odake (Japanese lyrics)	Creatore; Peretti; Weiss	3:36
5.	"Heart Song"	Jam9	Fast Lane; Desmond	3:34
6.	"Eden no Sono" (エデンの園; Garden of Eden)	Odake	Fast Lane; Desmond	3:53
7.	"XOXO"	Ami	Jon Hällgren; Kanata Okajima	4:14
8.	"Surf on the Summer"	Emi Tawata	Dominic Rodriguez; Richard Garcia; Anne Judith Wik; Ronny Svendsen; Nermin Harambasic	3:29
9.	"Jump!"	Ami	Fast Lane	4:17
10.	"Dress wo Nuida Cinderella" (ドレスを脱いだシンデレラ; The Cinderella Who Took Off Her Dress)	Odake	Fast Lane; Desmond	3:45
11.	"Follow Me" (Dream Ami version)	Shoko Fujibayashi	Jam9; ArmySlick	4:44
12.	"Magic Time" (マジックタイム)	Odake	Manaka Suzuki; Hiroki Sagawa	4:52
13.	"Lovefool: Sukidatte Itte" (好きだって言って; Say That You Love Me; The Cardigans cover)	Peter Svensson; Nina Persson; Odake (Japanese lyrics)	Svensson; Persson	3:12
14.	"Change My Life"	Fujibayashi	Mats Lie Skare; Shikata; Desmond	4:18
15.	"Alright!"	Hiromi	Fast Lane; Erik Lidbom; Maria Marcus	4:03
16.	"Kimi no Tonari" (君のとなり; Next to You)	Ami	Fast Lane	4:02
17.	"Saitei na Start" (サイテーなスタート; Worst Start)	Simon Isogai; Ami	Isogai	5:39
Total length:				69:36

DVD
No.	Title	Director	Length
1.	"Dress wo Nuida Cinderella" (Video clip)	Shigeaki Kubo	4:34
2.	"Try Everything (Dream Ami version)" (Video clip)	Tanabe Hidenobu	3:24
3.	"Lovefool: Sukidatte Itte" (Video clip)	Tanabe	3:22
4.	"Hayaku Aitai" (Video clip)	Tanabe	5:04
5.	"Kimi no Tonari" (Video clip)	Tanabe	4:17
6.	"Re: Dream" (Video clip)	Ayano Seki	4:20
7.	"XOXO" (Video clip)	Kenta Tanoue	4:19
8.	"Dream Ami Document Movie"	Tanoue

== Charts and sales ==
Chart (2017)	Peak position
Japan Hot Albums (Billboard)	6
Japan Top Album Sales (Billboard)	8
Japan Daily Chart (Oricon)	6
Japan Weekly Chart (Oricon)	8
Japan Weekly Digital Chart (Oricon)	13
Japan Monthly Chart (Oricon)	34

=== Sales ===
Region	Sales
Japan (Oricon)	12,656 (physical)
Japan (Oricon)	638 (digital)

== Release history ==
Region	Date	Format(s)	Label	Ref.
Japan	October 4, 2017	CD; digital download	Avex Entertainment Inc.; Rhythm Zone	
Various	October 4, 2017	Digital download	Avex Entertainment Inc.	
South Korea	October 20, 2017	Digital download	S.M. Entertainment; Genie Music	
