= Houkago Princess =

Japanese idol girl group

Hōkago Princess 放課後プリンセス
- Origin: Japan
- Labels: Tiara Records; Universal Music; FORZA RECORDS
- Website: houpri.com

Houkago Princess (放課後プリンセス, Hōkago Purinsesu; lit. "After School Princess") is a Japanese idol girl group. Their album Seifuku Cinderella reached the sixth place on the weekly Oricon Albums Chart and their single "Junpaku Antoinette" reached the second place on the weekly Oricon Singles Chart.

== Members ==
=== Current members ===
- Saho Michishige (道重佐保)
- Sasara Sekine (関根ささら)
- Nanase Kohinata (小日向ななせ)
- Momoka Sawada (澤田桃佳)
- Airi Nishimiya (西宮愛理)
- Yuu Morikawa (森川優羽)

==== Candidate members ====
- Maki Yoshioka (吉岡真希)
- Ami Mizuno (水野青海)

=== Former members ===
- Yurika Hagi (萩ユリカ)
- Mai Yamaguchi (山口舞)
- Yuki Kishitani (岸谷優希)
- Yumeka (夢夏)
- Chiaki Shirahoshi (白星ちあき)
- Rena Kobayashi (小林玲奈)
- Ria Matsumoto (松本梨愛)
- Erina Asakura (朝倉恵璃菜)
- Kanari Suzukawa (鈴川かなり)
- Fuka Momose (百瀬楓花)
- Aoi Nagafuji (永藤葵)
- Sakino Chiba (千葉さきの)
- Kohana Aiuchi (相内今華)
- Hitomi Noda (野田仁美)
- Rika Shiraishi (白石りか)
- Risa Yamakawa (山川莉砂)
- Shiori Kawamura (河村しおり)
- Riho Sakurai (櫻井りほ)
- Kyoka Fukuhara (福原杏夏)
- Rin Hayamizu (早水凛)
- Nene Sakuragi (桜木寧々)
- Miho Ayase (綾瀬美穂)
- Maika Miyashita (宮下まゆか)
- Marina Nagasawa (長澤茉里奈)
- Mayumi Kojima (小島まゆみ)
- Himari Shirosaki (城崎ひまり)
- Nana Odagiri (小田桐奈々)
- Miran Yamaguchi (山口みらん)
- Saori Kizuki (木月沙織)
- Aoi Mizuki (水希蒼)
- Yuria Yukino (雪乃ゆりあ)
- Natsumi Yamamoto (山本夏望)
- Hiyori Takano (高野日和)
- Nobara Tani (谷のばら)
- Maika (舞花)

==== Candidates / Apprentices ====
- Serena Toyoda (豊田瀬理奈)
- Nana Kaji (梶奈々)
- Akane Haruno (春野茜)
- Airi Kamiya (神谷愛理)
- Sakura Izumi (泉美 桜)
- Yuyu Makihara (牧原ゆゆ)
- Nozomi Ota (太田希望)
- Nina Horii (堀井仁菜)
- Asami Tanaka (田中あさみ)
- Muta Haruyama (晴山むた)
- Nene Yuzuki (結月ねね)
- Ririsa Kirisawa (桐澤怜々紗)
- Natsuko Akimoto (秋元なつこ)
- Ayame Serizawa (芹沢あやめ)
- Rio Michishige (道重利緒)
- Yuri Takamiya (高宮悠里)
- Ai Suzuki (鈴木亜依)
- Yui Nakano (中野唯)
- Marina Tobe (戸部まりな)
- Yuka Sunohara (春原優花)
- Hana Masuda (増田花)
- Ai Shirakawa (白川愛)
- Fuyuka Kawanishi (川西冬華)
- Rea Kusunoki (楠木れあ)
- Nami Hanamura (花村なみ)
- Erina Kansai (閑歳絵里菜)
- Ruru Ozawa (小沢るる)
- Ririka Aoki (蒼木りりか)
- Arisa Himekawa (姫川ありさ)
- Rina Morishita (森下里奈)
- Yuriko Yoshinaga (吉永由莉子)
- Sumire Sato (佐藤純恋)
- Seina Tsurumaki (鶴巻星奈)
- Rion Nakano (仲野りおん)

== Discography ==
=== Albums ===
Title	Release date	Oricon
Seifuku Cinderella^{EP}	August 19, 2015	6
My Princess	March 22, 2017	6
My Princess II	January 29, 2020	13

=== Best Albums ===
Title	Release date	Oricon
Indies Best ~Memories~	March 22, 2017	
~10th Anniversary~ Princess Assemble	January 20, 2021	29

=== Indie Singles ===
Title	Release date	Oricon
Houkago Princess ~Oshiete Kudasai!~	August 3, 2011	
Juliet ～Kimi wo suki na 100 no riyū～	February 29, 2012	97
Uchuu Ichi no Christmas	December 24, 2011	
Kojiki Shika!	October 7, 2012	
Housou-bu Please	December 2, 2012	
Uchuu Ichi no Christmas (2012-2013 Version)	December 21, 2012	
Juliet ～Kimi wo suki na 100 no riyū～(2013 version)	May 15, 2013	17
Samu wa Fuyui	November 27, 2013	26
Juliet ~Kimi wo Suki na 100 no Riyuu~ (2014 Version)	August 7, 2014	
Manatsu no yo no yume	September 23, 2014	7

=== Major Singles ===
Title	Release date	Oricon
Kiete, shirayukihime	October 28, 2015	10
Junpaku Antoinette	February 17, 2016	2
Seishun Mermaid	June 29, 2016	4
Himitsu no Tiara to Gelato	October 12, 2016	7
Lychee Red no Unmei	February 15, 2017	7
Sayonara Dualina	July 19, 2017	9
Abrakatab Luv!	December 20, 2017	7
Kaguya ni Negai wo	October 10, 2018	5
Shin Jidai Princess/Princess no Teigi	July 10, 2019	6
Shakunetsu no Mystery Eye / Zessei Cleopatra	July 29, 2020	7
Psyllium no Shoumei	September 15, 2021	5
