= Sayaka Shionoya =

Sayaka Shionoya 塩ノ谷 早耶香
- Born: 12 March 1994 (age 32); Kitakyushu, Fukuoka Prefecture, Japan
- Genres: J-pop
- Occupation: Singer
- Instrument: Singing
- Years active: 2013–17
- Label: King Records
- Website: Official website

Sayaka Shionoya (塩ノ谷 早耶香, Shionoya Sayaka; born 12 March 1994) is a former female singer. She was represented with LDH. Her label was King Records.

== Biography ==
Shionoya was born in Moji-ku, Kitakyūshū, Fukuoka Prefecture.

In 2011, she participated in the Performing Arts Office LDH sponsored Exile Presents Vocal Battle Audition 3 –For Girls–. Of the approximately 30,000 people, Shionoya became a finalist of the Flower vocal division, but it was unsuccessful. After that, she went to the Exile Professional Gym (EXPG) school in Fukuoka.

In 2012, Shionoya joined King Record's 80th Anniversary Commemoration Nationwide Audition King Records Presents Dream Vocal Audition. In the final judging held at Akasaka Blitz on 26 May, the winner of 15 finalists from among more than 10,000 candidate candidates, one of the three Grand Prix "Dream Vocalist Loved by ViVi" was awarded, and decided her debut. In August, Shionoya's single came to Tokyo. In 13 October, at the Tokyo Girls Collection held at the Saitama Super Arena, she was selected as the next generation artist who took the most attention among the Audition's Grand Prix winners held throughout Japan, and debuted as "TGC 2012 A/W The Best Vocal Audition" she sang in front of 30,000 people before while.

On 23 January 2013, Shionoya made her major debut with the single "Dear Heaven".

On 18 May 2017, she announced her retirement in the entertainment industry.

== Personal life ==
- In Vocal Battle Audition 3, Shionoya passed a pear to Reina Washio. Shionoya said that her "rivals are of course Flower, I want to keep trying each other."
- At a commemorative photo shooting, she is nicknamed "Shiochī", there is a pose called "Shiochī Pose" which represents "picking one salt" over the time, and at the release event etc., it was customary to take a photo with the visitors together with a shout of "Shio Cheese" at this pose.
- Shionoya's target singer was Yuna Ito.
- Her height is over 150 cm (4 ft 11 in) (from her blog).

== Discography ==
Highest in the Oricon weekly ranking

=== Singles ===
	Date	Title	Rank
1st	23 Jan 2013	Dear Heaven	32
2nd	15 May 2013	Katakoi / Smile again	20
3rd	21 Aug 2013	Ocean Blue	29
4th	6 Nov 2013	Snow Flakes Love / Ichirinka	16
5th	4 Jun 2014	Like a flower	15
6th	22 Jun 2016	Smiley Days	21
7th	7 Dec 2016	Mahō	34

=== Albums ===
	Date	Title	Rank
1st	10 Dec 2014	Luna	20
2nd	25 Jan 2017	Mist-ic	40

=== Mini albums ===
	Date	Title	Rank
1st	28 Oct 2015	S with	20

== Tie-ups ==
Song	Tie-up	Ref.
Dear Heaven	Film Kon-Shin supporters song	
Dear Heaven	Nippon TV series Happy Music Power Play	
One	Autobacs Seven (Kansai Area) "Car Navigation Super Fair" advertisement song	
Katakoi	Nippon TV series Music Dragon Power Play	
Katakoi	Mainichi Broadcasting System mm-TV May 2013 ending song	
Smile again	Takarajimasha sweet May 2013 advertisement song	
Ocean Blue	Nippon TV series Futtonda August 2013 ending theme	
Snow Flakes Love	"Fuyu Supo!! Winter Sports Festa Season 13" theme song	
Snow Flakes Love	Hokkaido Cultural Broadcasting U-gata TV October 2013 ending theme	
Ichirinka	Tōkai Television Broadcasting Produced Fuji Television drama Tengoku no Koi theme song	
Get Set, Go	"Fukuoka Marathon" theme song	
Like a flower	Film Samurai Hustle theme song	
Soredemo Sekai wa Utsukushī	Wowow Renzoku Drama W Heisei Sarukanikassen-zu theme song	
Yukizora	"Fuyu Supo!! Winter Sports Festa 14" official theme song	
Destiny feat. MLC	"2015/16 V League" official theme song	
Believing	Film Itazurana Kiss The Movie: Campus theme song	

== Filmography ==
=== Radio ===
Run	Title	Network	Notes
Jan 2013 – Mar 2015	Sayaka Shionoya no "Kiite kudasari arigatō gozaimasu Radio"	FM Fukuoka	
Jul – Dec 2013	FM Osaka E∞tracks Selection "Sayaka Shionoya no Salty cafe"	FM Osaka	Every second Monday charge
Sep 2016 – May 2017	Yamahan presents Music Salad From U-kari Studio	Bay FM	On Thursdays

=== Advertisements ===
Run	Title	Notes	Ref.
2014	Kitakyushu City Special Mission Ambassador		
Feb 2014 – Mar 2015	Nishi-Nippon Railroad Ecol Card	Image character	
Jan 2015	Kitakyushu Mayor's election	Keihatsu image character	
2015–16	Japan Volleyball League Organization 2015–16 V League	Image artist	

== Live ==
Dates	Title	Location
31 Jul, 5 Aug 2016	Sayaka Shionoya Live 2016 –always with you–	
25 Oct 2016	LDH Showcase Live "Music Box" Vol. 1	Ebisu Act Square
