= Kozo Kinomoto =

Japanese footballer (1949–2017)

Personal information
- Date of birth: 8 January 1949
- Place of birth: Chiba, Japan
- Date of death: 15 January 2017 (aged 68)
- Position: Midfielder

Senior career*
Years	Team	Apps	(Gls)
1972–1975	Furukawa Electric		
- * Club domestic league appearances and goals

Kozo Kinomoto (木之本 興三, Kinomoto Kōzō; 8 January 1949 – 15 January 2017) was a Japanese footballer who played as a midfielder for Furukawa Electric from 1972 to 1975 before being forced to retire due to kidney problem. After his playing career he became a sports executive and served as director in the Japan Football League until 2003.

In his later years Kinomoto lost both of his legs due to health issues and died on 15 January 2017 at the age of 68.
