= Kenshi Yonezu discography =

- Studio albums: 8
- Singles: 29

The discography of Japanese singer-songwriter Kenshi Yonezu consists of eight studio albums (two under the stage name Hachi), and twenty-nine singles.

== Albums ==
=== Studio albums ===
List of studio albums, showing selected details, chart positions, sales, and certifications
Title	Details	Peak chart positions				Sales	Certifications
Title	Details	JPN	JPN Cmb. (Note: The Oricon Combined Albums Chart was established on December 24, 2018.)	JPN Hot	US World	Sales	Certifications
Diorama	Released: May 16, 2012; Label: Balloom; Formats: CD, digital download, streaming	6	32	31	—	JPN: 57,000	
Yankee	Released: April 23, 2014; Label: Universal Sigma; Formats: CD, CD/DVD, CD/art book, digital download, streaming	2	19	14	—	JPN: 129,000	RIAJ: Platinum (phy.)
Bremen	Released: October 7, 2015; Label: Universal Sigma; Formats: CD, CD/DVD, CD/art book, digital download, streaming	1	28	1	—	JPN: 117,637	RIAJ: Gold (phy.)
Bootleg	Released: November 1, 2017; Label: Sony; Formats: CD, CD/DVD, CD/vinyl/art book, digital download, streaming	1	3	1	—	JPN: 613,027	RIAJ: 2× Platinum (phy.); Gold (dig.)
Stray Sheep	Released: August 5, 2020; Label: Sony; Formats: CD, CD/DVD, CD/art book, digital download, streaming	1	1	1	—	JPN: 1,639,880	RIAJ: Million (phy.); Gold (dig.)
Lost Corner	Released: August 21, 2024; Label: Sony; Formats: CD, CD+DVD, CD+Blu-ray, digital download, streaming	1	1	1	14	JPN: 555,177	RIAJ: 2× Platinum (phy.)
As Hachi
Hanataba to Suisō (花束と水葬)	Released: February 7, 2010; Label: Self-released; Formats: CD, digital download, streaming	70	—	100	—	JPN: 2,000	
Official Orange	Released: November 14, 2010; Label: Self-released; Formats: CD, digital download, streaming	72	—	— (Note: In 2013, the re-issued album charted at number 57 on the Top Albums Sales chart.)	—	JPN: 2,000	
"—" denotes releases that did not chart or were not released in that region.

== Singles ==
=== As lead artist ===
List of singles as lead artist, showing year released, selected chart positions, sales, certifications, and album name
Title	Year	Peak chart positions										Sales	Certifications	Album
Title	Year	JPN	JPN Cmb. (Note: The Oricon Combined Singles Chart was established on December 24, 2018.)	JPN Hot	CAN	HK	KOR	TWN	US Rock / Alt.	US World	WW	Sales	Certifications	Album
"Santa Maria" (サンタマリア)	2013	12	—	26	—	—	—	—	—	—	—	JPN: 14,000 (phy.)		Yankee
"Mad Head Love"	2013	11	—	51	—	—	—	—	—	—	—	JPN: 10,000 (phy.)		Yankee
"Poppin' Apathy" (ポッピンアパシー)	2013	11	—	—	—	—	—	—	—	—	—	JPN: 10,000 (phy.)		Non-album single
"Flowerwall"	2015	3	—	5	—	—	—	—	—	—	—	JPN: 28,000 (phy.)	RIAJ: Gold (dig.)	Bremen
"Unbelievers" (アンビリーバーズ)	2015	4	—	5	—	—	—	—	—	—	—	JPN: 32,000 (phy.)		Bremen
"Donut Hole" (ドーナツホール) (as Hachi)	2015	—	—	55	—	—	—	—	—	—	—		RIAJ: Gold (dig.) (Note: Self-cover version only.)	Yankee
"Loser"	2016	2	16	3	—	—	—	—	—	—	—	JPN: 48,000 (phy.); JPN: 750,000+ (dig.)	RIAJ: 3× Platinum (dig.); Platinum (st.)	Bootleg
"Number Nine" (ナンバーナイン)	2016	2	16	29	—	—	—	—	—	—	—	JPN: 48,000 (phy.)		Bootleg
"Orion"	2017	3	41	3	—	—	—	—	—	—	—	JPN: 52,400 (phy.); JPN: 250,000+ (dig.)	RIAJ: Platinum (dig.); Gold (st.)	Bootleg
"Peace Sign" (ピースサイン)	2017	2	36	1	—	—	—	—	—	—	—	JPN: 74,000 (phy.); JPN: 500,000+ (dig.)	RIAJ: Gold (phy.); 3× Platinum (dig.); 2× Platinum (st.); RIAA: Gold	Bootleg
"Dune" (砂の惑星) (as Hachi featuring Hatsune Miku)	2017	—	—	25 (Note: Charted as the self-cover version.)	—	—	—	—	—	—	—		RIAJ: Gold (dig.) (Note: Self-cover version only.)	Bootleg
"Lemon"	2018	2	1	1	—	—	108	—	—	—	—	JPN: 551,000 (phy.); JPN: 3,000,000+ (dig.)	RIAJ: 2× Platinum (phy.); 3× Million (dig.); 3× Platinum (st.)	Stray Sheep
"Flamingo"	2018	1	4	1	—	—	—	—	—	—	—	JPN: 296,000 (phy.); JPN: 500,000+ (dig.)	RIAJ: Platinum (phy.); 2× Platinum (dig.); Platinum (st.)	Stray Sheep
"Teenage Riot"	2018	1	4	4	—	—	—	—	—	—	—	JPN: 296,000 (phy.); JPN: 100,000+ (dig.)	RIAJ: Platinum (phy.); Gold (dig.)	Stray Sheep
"Spirits of the Sea" (海の幽霊)	2019	—	4	1	—	—	—	—	—	—	—		RIAJ: Platinum (dig.); Gold (st.)	Stray Sheep
"Uma to Shika" (馬と鹿)	2019	2	2	1	—	—	—	—	—	25	—	JPN: 471,055+ (phy.); JPN: 1,000,000+ (dig.)	RIAJ: 2× Platinum (phy.); Million (dig.); 2× Platinum (st.)	Stray Sheep
"Paprika" (パプリカ)	2020	—	3	4	—	—	—	—	—	—	—		RIAJ: Platinum (dig.); Gold (st.)	Stray Sheep
"Pale Blue"	2021	1	1	1	—	—	—	—	—	—	52	JPN: 202,000 (phy.); JPN: 240,000 (dig.)	RIAJ: Platinum (phy.); Gold (dig.); Platinum (st.)	Lost Corner
"Pop Song"	2022	—	4	2	—	—	—	—	—	—	188	JPN: 81,000 (dig.)	RIAJ: Gold (dig.); Gold (st.)	Lost Corner
"M87" (M八七)	2022	2	2	1	—	—	—	—	—	—	69	JPN: 228,880 (phy.)	RIAJ: Platinum (phy.); Gold (dig.); Platinum (st.)	Lost Corner
"Kick Back"	2022	1	1	1	100	16	87	4	26	3	13	JPN: 312,952 (phy.); JPN: 204,986 (dig.)	RIAJ: Platinum (phy.); Platinum (dig.); Diamond (st.); RIAA: Platinum	Lost Corner
"Lady"	2023	—	11	2	—	—	—	—	—	—	— (Note: "Lady" did not enter the Billboard Global 200, but peaked at number 178 on the Global Excl. US.)		RIAJ: Platinum (st.)	Lost Corner
"Tsuki o Miteita (Moongazing)" (月を見ていた)	2023	—	10	3	—	—	— (Note: "Tsuki o Miteita (Moongazing)" did not enter the Circle Digital Chart, but peaked at number 199 on the component Download Chart.)	—	—	—	—			Lost Corner
"Spinning Globe" (地球儀)	2023	3	2	2	—	—	— (Note: "Spinning Globe" did not enter the Circle Digital Chart, but peaked at number 142 on the component Download Chart.)	—	—	—	— (Note: "Spinning Globe" did not enter the Billboard Global 200, but peaked at number 143 on the Global Excl. US.)	JPN: 70,825 (phy.)	RIAJ: Gold (phy.); Gold (dig.); Platinum (st.)	The Boy and the Heron and Lost Corner
"Sayonara, Mata Itsuka!" (さよーならまたいつか!)	2024	—	4	2	—	—	— (Note: "Sayonara, Mata Itsuka!" did not enter the Circle Digital Chart, but peaked at number 140 on the component Download Chart.)	—	—	—	152		RIAJ: Gold (dig.); 2× Platinum (st.)	Lost Corner
"Mainichi" (毎日)	2024	—	10	6	—	—	— (Note: "Mainichi" did not enter the Circle Digital Chart, but peaked at number 131 on the component Download Chart.)	—	—	—	—		RIAJ: Gold (st.)	Lost Corner
"Azalea"	2024	—	6	5	—	—	— (Note: "Azalea" did not enter the Circle Digital Chart, but peaked at number 153 on the component Download Chart.)	—	—	—	—		RIAJ: Gold (st.)	Non-album singles
"Plazma"	2025	1	1	1	—	—	— (Note: "Plazma" did not enter the Circle Digital Chart, but peaked at number 135 on the component Download Chart.)	—	—	—	160	JPN: 296,022 (phy.)	RIAJ: Platinum (phy.); Gold (dig.); Platinum (st.)	Non-album singles
"Bow and Arrow"	2025	1	1	4	—	—	— (Note: "Bow and Arrow" did not enter the Circle Digital Chart, but peaked at number 79 on the component Download Chart.)	—	—	—	— (Note: "Bow and Arrow" did not enter the Billboard Global 200, but peaked at number 163 on the Global Excl. US.)	JPN: 296,022 (phy.)	RIAJ: Platinum (phy.); Gold (dig.); Platinum (st.)	Non-album singles
"Iris Out"	2025	2	1	1	—	5	5	2	—	3	5	JPN: 291,980 (phy.)	RIAJ: Platinum (phy.); Platinum (dig.); 3× Platinum (st.)	Non-album singles
"Jane Doe" (with Hikaru Utada)	2025	2	1	2	—	5	16	3	—	4	32	JPN: 291,980 (phy.)	RIAJ: Platinum (phy.); Gold (dig.); 2× Platinum (st.)	Non-album singles
"1991"	2025	—	5	3	—	—	—	—	—	—	— (Note: "1991" did not enter the Billboard Global 200, but peaked at number 140 on the Global Excl. US.)			Non-album singles
"Karasu" (烏)	2026	—	3	1	—	—	—	—	—	—	— (Note: "Karasu" did not enter the Billboard Global 200, but peaked at number 113 on the Global Excl. US.)			Non-album singles
"Yodaka" (夜鷹)	2026	—	11	5	—	—	—	—	—	—	—			Non-album singles
"—" denotes releases that did not chart or were not released in that region.

=== As featured artist ===
List of singles as featured artist, showing year released, selected chart positions, sales, certifications, and album name
Title	Year	Peak chart positions		Sales	Certifications	Album
Title	Year	JPN	JPN Hot	Sales	Certifications	Album
"Nanimono" (Yasutaka Nakata featuring Kenshi Yonezu)	2016	—	11	JPN: 100,000+ (dig.)	RIAJ: Gold (dig.)	Digital Native
"Uchiage Hanabi" (打上花火) (Daoko featuring Kenshi Yonezu)	2017	9	1	JPN: 30,000 (phy.); JPN: 500,000+ (dig.)	RIAJ: 2× Platinum (dig.); Gold (dig.) (Note: Solo version only.); 3× Platinum (st.)	Thank You Blue
"—" denotes releases that did not chart.

=== Promotional singles ===
List of promotional singles, showing year released, selected chart positions, sales, certifications, and album name
Title	Year	Peak chart positions			Certifications	Album
Title	Year	JPN Cmb. (Note: The Oricon Combined Singles Chart was established on December 24, 2018.)	JPN Hot	WW	Certifications	Album
"Wonderland to Hitsuji no Uta" (ワンダーランドと羊の歌) (as Hachi)	2010	—	—	—		Official Orange
"Go Go Yūreisen" (ゴーゴー幽霊船)	2012	—	—	—		Diorama
"Vivi"	2012	—	—	—		Diorama
"Koi to Byōnetsu" (恋と病熱)	2012	—	—	—		Diorama
"Living Dead Youth" (リビングデッド・ユース)	2014	—	—	—		Yankee
"Eine Kleine" (アイネクライネ)	2014	38	19	—	RIAJ: 2× Platinum (dig.); 2× Platinum (st.)	Yankee
"Fluorite" (フローライト)	2015	—	62	—		Bremen
"Hope Land" (ホープランド)	2015	—	— (Note: Charted at number 100 on the Radio Songs sub-chart.)	—		Bremen
"Haiiro to Ao" (灰色と青) (with Masaki Suda)	2017	43	3	—	RIAJ: 2× Platinum (dig.); Platinum (st.)	Bootleg
"Kanden" (感電)	2019	3	2	110	RIAJ: 2× Platinum (dig.); 3× Platinum (st.)	Stray Sheep
"Red Out"	2024	34	24	—		Lost Corner
"Garakuta" (がらくた)	2024	12	7	— (Note: "Garakuta" did not enter the Billboard Global 200, but peaked at number 193 on the Global Excl. US.)	RIAJ: Gold (st.)	Lost Corner
"—" denotes releases that did not chart or were not released in that region.

== Other charted and certified songs ==
List of songs not released as singles, showing year released, selected chart positions, sales, certifications, and album name
Title	Year	Peak chart positions			Sales	Certifications	Album
Title	Year	JPN Cmb. (Note: The Oricon Combined Singles Chart was established on December 24, 2018.)	JPN Hot	WW	Sales	Certifications	Album
"Melancholy Kitchen" (メランコリーキッチン)	2014	—	—	—		RIAJ: Platinum (st.)	Yankee
"Metronome" (メトロノーム)	2015	—	55	—		RIAJ: Gold (dig.); Gold (st.)	Bremen
"Shunrai" (春雷)	2017	—	23	—		RIAJ: Gold (dig.); Platinum (st.)	Bootleg
"Cranberry & Pancake" (クランベリーとパンケーキ)	2018	—	88	—			Lemon
"Gomenne" (ごめんね)	2018	—	12	—			Flamingo/Teenage Riot
"Deshomasho" (でしょましょ)	2019	—	50	—			Uma to Shika
"Campanella" (カムパネルラ)	2020	14	11	—		RIAJ: Gold (st.)	Stray Sheep
"Placebo" (with Yojiro Noda)	2020	15	21	—		RIAJ: Gold (st.)	Stray Sheep
"Yasashii Hito" (優しい人)	2020	38	55	—			Stray Sheep
"Machigai Sagashi" (まちがいさがし)	2020	12	16	—		RIAJ: Gold (st.)	Stray Sheep
"Himawari" (ひまわり)	2020	41	56	—			Stray Sheep
"Stray Sheep" (迷える羊)	2020	40	32	—			Stray Sheep
"Décolleté"	2020	—	72	—			Stray Sheep
"Canary" (カナリヤ)	2020	—	44	—			Stray Sheep
"Yume Utsutsu" (ゆめうつつ)	2021	—	31	— (Note: "Yume Utsutsu" did not enter the Billboard Global 200, but peaked at number 173 on the Global Excl. US.)	JPN: 32,000 (dig.)		Lost Corner
"Shinigami" (死神)	2021	—	12	148	JPN: 41,000 (dig.)	RIAJ: Gold (st.)	Lost Corner
"ETA"	2022	—	75	—			M87
"Margherita" (with Aina the End)	2024	—	92	—			Lost Corner
"Tremolo" (トレモロ)	2025	8	6	—			Dear Jubilee: Radwimps Tribute
"—" denotes releases that did not chart or were not released in that region.
