= Poppin' Apathy =

2013 single by Kenshi Yonezu

Single by Kenshi Yonezu
- A-side: "Mad Head Love" (double A-side)
- B-side: "Tori ni Demo Naritai"
- Released: October 23, 2013
- Recorded: 2013
- Genre: Alternative rock
- Length: 3:51
- Label: Universal Sigma
- Songwriter: Kenshi Yonezu
- Producer: Kenshi Yonezu

Kenshi Yonezu singles chronology
"Santa Maria" (2013)	"Poppin' Apathy" / "Mad Head Love" (2013)	"Flowerwall" (2015)

Music video
- "Poppin' Apathy" on YouTube

"Poppin' Apathy" (Japanese: ポッピンアパシー, Hepburn: Poppin Apashī) is a song by Japanese singer-songwriter Kenshi Yonezu. It was released as a double A-side single alongside the song "Mad Head Love" on October 23, 2013 by Universal Sigma, on the same day that Yonezu's two self-released Vocaloid albums, Hanataba to Suisō and Official Orange, were re-issued by independent label Boundee by SSNW. Though recorded during sessions for Yonezu's album Yankee, the song was not included on its final track list.

== Background and development ==
In May 2012, Yonezu released Diorama, his third album and first to use his own vocals. It was released under independent label Balloom. The album was written, produced and illustrated entirely by Yonezu himself. The album was commercially successful, debuting at number six on Oricon's albums charts, and was one of the most sold independently released albums of 2012 in Japan.

A year later, Yonezu debuted under major label Universal Music Japan with the single "Santa Maria". Two of the songs were performed with a band, the first time Yonezu had worked like this. The single reached number 12 on chart provider Oricon's singles chart.

A week after the single's release, Yonezu released his first Vocaloid song in two and a half years, called "Donut Hole" (ドーナツホール, Dōnatsu Hōru), using Gumi vocals. It was the first time he used a live band on a Vocaloid song.

== Writing and production ==
"Mad Head Love" and "Poppin' Apathy" were written at the same time, based on the theme of a Möbius strip. "Mad Head Love" was "positive" and "high tension", while "Poppin' Apathy" was written as a gloomy, negative song by Yonezu. Because of this, he felt it was right for them to be released together. Originally "Poppin' Apathy" was not planned to be an A-side. When drawing the cover art for "Mad Head Love", he felt it would be interesting to see the characters drawn on the cover from the opposite side. This idea made Yonezu create a design for "Poppin' Apathy", and gave him the idea to release the single as a double A side release. "Poppin' Apathy", along with the single's B-side "Tori ni Demo Naritai" were arranged by Yonezu without a live band, in contrast to the live band sound present on "Mad Head Love". "Poppin' Apathy" was written close to Yonezu's true feelings are when composing. He finds it easy to be too self-conscious and pessimistic, so put these feelings into song.

== Promotion and release ==
The single was first announced in August 2013. Initially, the release date was planned for October 30, 2013, however it was later moved earlier to the 23rd. "Mad Head Love" and "Poppin' Apathy" were first aired on the JFM radio show Yamada Hisashi ni Radian Limited F on September 14, 2013. On September 21 and October 19, 2013 Yonezu held his regular online streaming performances on Ustream. Interviews with Yonezu were featured in the magazines Rockin' On Japan and Marquee around the release of the single.

== Music video ==
A music video for "Poppin' Apathy" was released online on October 12, 2013 (three weeks after "Mad Head Love"), and was directed by Sojiro Kamitani, who also directed the video for "Mad Head Love". Both videos featured similar settings, and "Poppin' Apathy" depicts a room in a darker, more cluttered environment than "Mad Head Love". It shows Yonezu by himself, performing chemistry experiments and using tools such as saws and drills to create objects. Similar strange moving objects are shown in the video as well, such as a machine to draw an oval in pencil on a piece of paper. The objects are dysfunctional, and often fall over or break. Other scenes show mixing equipment and monitors. The video features a golden Fender Stratocaster guitar.

== Reception ==
Commercially, the single debuted at number 11 on Oricon's singles chart, selling 6,300 copies. In total, it has sold 8,000 copies, under-performing Yonezu's previous single "Santa Maria".

== Track listing ==
All tracks are written by Kenshi Yonezu.

No.	Title	Length
1.	"Mad Head Love"	3:40
2.	"Poppin' Apathy"	3:51
3.	"Tori ni Demo Naritai" (鳥にでもなりたい, "I Want to Be a Bird at Least")	2:43
Total length:		10:11

DVD
No.	Title	Director	Length
1.	"Mad Head Love (music video)"	Sojiro Kamatani	3:44
2.	"Poppin' Apathy (music video)"	Kamatani	3:59

== Personnel ==
Personnel details were sourced from an interview with Yonezu, as well as Yankee's liner notes booklet.

Performance credits

- Masuo Arimatsu – drum technician
- Kazutaka Minemori – guitar technician
- Masashi Uramoto – recording, mixing
- Kenshi Yonezu – all instruments, arrangement, lyrics, guitar, music, production, programming, vocals

== Chart rankings ==
All figures pertain to the "Mad Head Love" / "Poppin' Apathy" physical single release.

Charts (2013)	Peak position
Japan Billboard Hot Single Sales	9
Japan Oricon daily singles	10
Japan Oricon weekly singles	11

=== Sales ===
Chart	Amount
Oricon physical sales	9,700

== Release history ==
Region	Date	Format	Distributing label	Catalogue codes
Japan	October 23, 2013	CD, CD+DVD, digital download, rental CD	Universal Music Japan	UMCK-5447, UMCK-9639
Worldwide	October 26, 2013	Digital download	Universal Music Japan	—N/a
