= Mad Head Love =

2013 single by Kenshi Yonezu

Single by Kenshi Yonezu

from the album Yankee
- A-side: "Poppin' Apathy" (double A-side)
- B-side: "Tori ni Demo Naritai"
- Released: October 23, 2013
- Recorded: 2013
- Genre: Alternative rock
- Length: 3:40
- Label: Universal Sigma
- Songwriter: Kenshi Yonezu
- Producer: Kenshi Yonezu

Kenshi Yonezu singles chronology
| "Santa Maria" (2013) | "Mad Head Love" / "Poppin' Apathy" (2013) | "Flowerwall" (2015) |

Music video
- "Mad Head Love" on YouTube

"Mad Head Love" (stylized in all caps) is a song by Japanese singer-songwriter Kenshi Yonezu. It was released as a double A-side single alongside the song "Poppin' Apathy" on October 23, 2013, by Universal Signma, on the same day that Yonezu's two self-released Vocaloid albums, Hanataba to Suisō and Official Orange, were re-issued by independent label Boundee by SSNW.

== Background and development ==
In May 2012, Yonezu released Diorama through independent label Balloom, which was his first album under his real name and vocals. The album was written, produced and illustrated entirely by Yonezu himself. The album was commercially successful, debuting at number six on Oricon's albums charts, and was one of the most sold independently released albums of 2012 in Japan. A year later, Yonezu debuted under major label Universal Music Japan with the single "Santa Maria." Two of the songs were performed with a band, the first time Yonezu had worked like this. The single reached number 12 on chart provider Oricon's singles chart.

A week after the single's release, Yonezu released his first Vocaloid song in two and a half years, called "Donut Hole" (ドーナツホール, Dōnatsu Hōru), using Gumi vocals. It was the first time he used a live band on a Vocaloid song.

== Writing and production ==
"Mad Head Love" and "Poppin' Apathy" were written at the same time, based on the theme of a Möbius strip. "Mad Head Love" was "positive" and "high tension", while "Poppin' Apathy" was written as a gloomy, negative song by Yonezu. Because of this, he felt it was right for them to be released together. Originally "Mad Head Love" was planned to be the sole A-side. The song was the second time Yonezu worked with a live band, after "Santa Maria" and its B-side "Hyakki Yakō". He enlisted childhood friend Hiroshi Nakajima to work as a guitarist on the song. The pair formed a band when they were at high school, with Yonezu singing his own compositions, and Nakajima accompanying him on guitar. "Mad Head Love" also features Masaki Hori, drummer for Sapporo-based band Scam Circle, and Yu Sato, the bassist for U&Design and a support member for Nona Reeves. Hori and Sato worked on sessions for other songs, including the Vocaloid song "Donut Hole" Yonezu released shortly after the single. In contrast, "Poppin' Apathy" and "Tori ni Demo Naritai" were arranged by Yonezu without a live band.

"Mad Head Love" was written about Yonezu's feelings when composing music, and gave the song a theme of "communication friction." As he always composes alone, he wrote about how it would be nice to connect with another person, even negatively. The lyrics depict love between two people, as well as their clashing opinions.

== Promotion and release ==
The single was first announced in August 2013. Initially, the release date was planned for October 30, 2013, but it was later moved to the 23rd. "Mad Head Love" and "Poppin' Apathy" were first aired on the JFM radio show Yamada Hisashi ni Radian Limited F on September 14, 2013. On September 21 and October 19, 2013, Yonezu held his regular online streaming performances on Ustream. Interviews with Yonezu was featured in the magazines Rockin' On Japan and Marquee around the release of the single.

== Music video ==
A music video for "Mad Head Love" was released online on September 21, 2013, and was directed by Sojiro Kamitani, who also directed a video for "Poppin' Apathy". "Mad Head Love" features three different scenes. Yonezu is shown performing different instruments such as a red Fender Telecaster electric guitar and a keyboard, as well as holding a recording device and listening through headphones. Other scenes show a Caucasian man and woman in beige clothing. They interact by prodding each other, such as poking the other person's ear, or messing up their hair. Other scenes show strange moving contraptions, such as one that turns a toy horse around, or a golden crane that drops a plastic fish onto a plate. The video for "Poppin' Apathy" was shot in the same location as "Mad Head Love", but in a darker, more cluttered environment.

It was one of 50 nominated for best video at the 2014 Space Shower Music Video Awards.

== Reception ==
Commercially, the single debuted at number 11 on Oricon's singles chart, selling 6,300 copies. In total, it has sold 8,000 copies, under-performing Yonezu's previous single "Santa Maria".

The single was received well by music critics. OK Music described the single as "walking around in a badly controlled amusement park," and "had only praise for the off-beat sound make" of the single. Tomoyuki Mori of What's In? felt that the single was a "great development of [Yonezu's] unique style" from Diorama. He praised the "positive and negative" theme of the single, and was impressed by the constantly changing melody and "intricately constructed band sound" of "Mad Head Love", along with its literary lyrics, calling it "modern pop music". He was also impressed at the B-side "Tori ni Demo Naritai," noting how the "strange twisty sound" evoked both scariness and cuteness.

== Track listing ==
All tracks are written by Kenshi Yonezu.

| No. | Title | Length |
|---|---|---|
| 1. | "Mad Head Love" | 3:40 |
| 2. | "Poppin' Apathy" (ポッピンアパシー, Poppin Apashī) | 3:51 |
| 3. | "Tori ni Demo Naritai" (鳥にでもなりたい, "I Want to Be a Bird at Least") | 2:43 |
| Total length: | | 10:11 |

DVD
| No. | Title | Director | Length |
|---|---|---|---|
| 1. | "Mad Head Love (music video)" | Sojiro Kamatani | 3:44 |
| 2. | "Poppin' Apathy (music video)" | Kamatani | 3:59 |

== Personnel ==
Personnel details were sourced from an interview with Yonezu, as well as Yankee's liner notes booklet.

Performance credits

- Masaki Hori – drums
- Hiroshi Nakajima – guitar
- Yu Suto – bass
- Kenshi Yonezu – guitar, vocals

Technical and production

- Masuo Arimatsu – drum technician
- Kazutaka Minemori – guitar technician
- Masashi Uramoto – recording, mixing
- Kenshi Yonezu – arrangement, lyrics, music, production, programming

== Chart rankings ==
| Charts (2013) | Peak position |
|---|---|
| Japan Billboard Adult Contemporary Airplay | 85 |
| Japan Billboard Japan Hot 100 | 51 |
| Japan Oricon daily singles: "Mad Head Love" / "Poppin' Apathy" | 10 |
| Japan Oricon weekly singles: "Mad Head Love" / "Poppin' Apathy" | 11 |

=== Sales ===
| Chart | Amount |
|---|---|
| Oricon physical sales | 9,700 |

== Release history ==
| Region | Date | Format | Distributing label | Catalogue codes |
|---|---|---|---|---|
| Japan | September 14, 2013 | Radio add date | Universal Music Japan | —N/a |
| Japan | October 23, 2013 | CD, CD+DVD, digital download, rental CD | Universal Music Japan | UMCK-5447, UMCK-9639 |
| Worldwide | October 26, 2013 | Digital download | Universal Music Japan | —N/a |
