= Music of The Boy and the Heron =

The Boy and the Heron (Original Soundtrack)

Film score and soundtrack album by Joe Hisaishi
- Released: August 9, 2023
- Recorded: 2022–2023
- Genre: Film score
- Length: 64:37
- Language: Japanese
- Labels: Studio Ghibli; Tokuma Japan
- Producer: Joe Hisaishi

Joe Hisaishi chronology
Soul Snatcher (2021)	The Boy and the Heron (Original Soundtrack) (2023)

Singles from The Boy and the Heron
- 1. "Spinning Globe" Released: July 26, 2023

The music of The Boy and the Heron (君たちはどう生きるか サウンドトラック, Kimitachi wa Dō Ikiru ka Saundotorakku), a film directed by Hayao Miyazaki and produced by Studio Ghibli, features a 37-track musical score composed by Joe Hisaishi, a longtime collaborator of both the director and the producer. It also features the film's main theme "Spinning Globe", performed by Kenshi Yonezu. The soundtrack was released through Tokuma Japan Communications on August 9, 2023.

== Main theme ==
In July 2018, Kenshi Yonezu visited the Studio Ghibli office for the first time and met Miyazaki on a potential collaboration. Miyazaki listened to the theme song "Paprika" which Yonezu had produced and composed for the 2020 Summer Olympics, and driven by his composition, he insisted him to write a theme song for the film. It was recorded with a small chamber orchestra and piano performed by Yonezu. The details of the song were not publicly revealed until the release of the film on July 14, 2023. Titled "Chikyūgi" (地球儀; lit. "Globe") in Japan, and "Spinning Globe" internationally, the song was first performed by Yonezu at the Yokohama Arena during Yonezu's tour, Kusou, though the song was not titled until its release. The advance distribution of the song began on July 17, 2023, and the song was released on July 26, with an accompanying music video.

== Release ==
Tokuma Japan Communications, the music distribution firm of Japanese publishing Tokuma Shoten, released the soundtrack to the film in Japan on August 9, 2023, through CDs and LPs, as well as to digital music and streaming platform. The international release of the soundtrack is yet to be announced.

== Reception ==
Joe Hisaishi's score received generally positive reviews from critics. Full Frontal author Matteo Watzky said that Hisaishi's score "seems to become increasingly minimal as time goes by". Screen Rant based critic Joshua Fox wrote: "The Boy and the Heron's score is also plenty commendable. Joe Hisaishi has, naturally, returned to provide the music, and his score does an amazing job of capturing the mood of every scene, whether it be tense, melancholy, or a rare moment of happiness among the cast. Hisaishi's score is as much of a treat in The Boy and the Heron as it is in other Studio Ghibli films, and when combined with the animation, it all comes together to give The Boy and the Heron a level of direction that stands out as one of Studio Ghibli's best, if not the best."

David Rooney of The Hollywood Reporter described Hisaishi's "loving score" renders the melodic emotionality of Miyazaki's visual language "even more beguiling". Olivia Siu of Annenberg Media wrote that Hisaishi's score "sounds less like a lullaby and more like a long goodbye". Tim Grierson of Screen International wrote "Hisaishi's piano-centric score is a stark wonder". Clint Worthington of Consequence wrote "Joe Hisaishi delivers another beautiful, plaintive score filled with lonely pianos that give way to sweeping strings". Meg Shields of Film School Rejects described it as a "heartstring-tugging score".

Allegra Frank, writing for The Daily Beast admitted that the film should earn Hisaishi his first Academy Award nomination for Best Original Score category, complimenting the simplistic nature of music as well as "evoking the voice of the unspoken" which she described as one of Hisaishi's greatest talent. She also complimented the piano pieces underscoring the film, were "hopeful and sweet", but also evokes a sense of melancholy.

== Accolades ==
Award	Date	Category	Result	Ref.
Florida Film Critics Circle Awards	21 December 2023	Best Score	Won	
Golden Globe Awards	7 January 2024	Best Original Score	Nominated	
Society of Composers & Lyricists Awards	13 February 2024	Outstanding Original Score for a Studio Film	Nominated	

In December 2023, the score was shortlisted for Best Original Score at the 96th Academy Awards.

== Track listing ==
All tracks are written by Joe Hisaishi, except where noted.

The Boy and the Heron (Original Soundtrack) track listing
No.	Title	Length
1.	"Ask Me Why (Evacuation)" (Ask me why (疎開))	1:20
2.	"White Wall" (白壁)	0:46
3.	"Gray Heron" (青サギ)	0:23
4.	"Memories" (追憶)	2:05
5.	"Gray Heron II" (青サギⅡ)	0:41
6.	"A Feather in the Dusk" (黄昏の羽根)	2:41
7.	"Adolescence" (思春期)	1:14
8.	"Gray Heron III" (青サギⅢ)	1:02
9.	"Silence" (静寂)	1:26
10.	"The Curse of the Gray Heron" (青サギの呪い)	1:40
11.	"Feather Fletching" (矢羽根)	2:57
12.	"Ask Me Why (Mother's Message)" (Ask me why (母の思い))	1:48
13.	"A Trap" (ワナ)	2:23
14.	"Sanctuary" (聖域)	2:46
15.	"The Master of the Tomb" (墓の主)	1:44
16.	"Ark" (箱船)	3:07
17.	"Warawara" (ワラワラ)	1:49
18.	"Reincarnation" (転生)	2:32
19.	"Rain of Fire" (火の雨)	1:35
20.	"Cursed Sea" (呪われた海)	2:35
21.	"Farewell" (別れ)	0:51
22.	"Reminiscence" (回顧)	2:23
23.	"Close Encounter" (急接近)	1:15
24.	"Diversion" (陽動)	1:02
25.	"A Girl of Fire" (炎の少女)	1:30
26.	"Mahito and Himi" (眞人とヒミ)	1:38
27.	"The Corridor Door" (回廊の扉)	1:33
28.	"A Burrow" (巣穴)	0:47
29.	"A Song of Prayer (The Delivery Room)" (祈りのうた (産屋))	3:48
30.	"Granduncle" (大伯父)	1:09
31.	"In Secret" (隠密)	0:35
32.	"The King's Parade" (大王の行進)	1:46
33.	"Granduncle's Desire" (大伯父の思い)	2:42
34.	"Ask Me Why (Mahito's Commitment)" (Ask me why (眞人の決意))	1:59
35.	"The Great Collapse" (大崩壊)	1:47
36.	"The Last Smile" (最後のほほえみ)	2:54
37.	"Spinning Globe" (地球儀; performed and written by Kenshi Yonezu)	4:33
Total length:		64:37

== Charts ==
=== Original soundtrack ===
==== Weekly charts ====
Weekly chart performance for The Boy and the Heron (Original Soundtrack)
Chart (2023)	Peak position
Japanese Albums (Oricon)	16
Japanese Combined Albums (Oricon)	27
Japanese Hot Albums (Billboard Japan)	15

==== Monthly charts ====
Monthly chart performance for The Boy and the Heron (Original Soundtrack)
Chart (2023)	Position
Japanese Albums (Oricon)	42

=== Version with the Royal Philharmonic Orchestra ===
Chart performance for The Boy and the Heron: Symphonic Suite for Piano and Orchestra
Chart (2026)	Peak position
Belgian Classical Albums (Ultratop Flanders)	2
Belgian Classical Albums (Ultratop Wallonia)	1
French Classical Albums (SNEP)	12
French Physical Albums (SNEP)	154
