= Loser/Number Nine =

2016 single by Kenshi Yonezu

Single by Kenshi Yonezu

from the album Bootleg
- Language: Japanese
- B-side: "Amen"
- Released: September 28, 2016
- Genre: J-pop
- Length: 13:02
- Label: Sony Music Records
- Songwriter: Kenshi Yonezu
- Producer: Kenshi Yonezu

Kenshi Yonezu singles chronology
"Donut Hole" (2015)	"Loser/Number Nine" (2016)	"Orion" (2017)

Alternative cover
- "Loser" limited edition cover

Alternative cover
- "Number Nine" limited edition cover

Music video
- "Loser" on YouTube

"Loser" (stylized in all caps) and "Number Nine" (Japanese: ナンバーナイン, Hepburn: Nanbā Nain) are songs by Japanese singer-songwriter Kenshi Yonezu. They were released together as a double A-side single on September 28, 2016, through Sony Music Entertainment, and later acted as the lead single for his fourth studio album Bootleg.

== Background and release ==
In 2015, Yonezu received an offer from the Louvre Museum's BD (bande dessinée) Project to create a theme song for Louvre No. 9 – Manga, The Ninth Art, an art exhibition that celebrated comics and manga as the recognized "ninth art". It featured freely-created works based on the theme of the Louvre from prominent mangaka such as Hirohiko Araki, Jiro Taniguchi, and Taiyō Matsumoto. The event was held at the Mori Arts Center Galley in Tokyo and ran from July 22 to September 25, 2016.

The title of the single was officially announced on July 29, 2016, planned for release on September 28 later that year. A trailer for "Number Nine" was uploaded to YouTube alongside the announcement. On August 4, the cover art for the standard edition of the single was revealed, illustrated by Yonezu. In addition, an upcoming solo tour later that year was also announced. On September 27, a panel exhibition featuring photographs of Yonezu at summer festivals that year would be held at various stores in Tokyo, where original extra-large "Loser" stamps from that limited edition's cover art were given away.

The single was released on September 28, 2016 in three editions: a standard edition, a "Loser" limited edition including a Jiffy bag containing the CD in a paper jacket and a dog tag, and a "Number Nine" limited edition including the CD in a 7-inch paper jacket and DVDs containing both music videos. The limited editions feature different cover artwork by Yonezu himself. First-press versions for all editions included a serial number for a lottery in winning tickets to Yonezu's 2016 Howl Tour that ran from November to December.

"Loser/Number Nine" marked Yonezu's first release under Sony Music Japan. His previous release was his third studio album Bremen in October 2015 under Universal Sigma.

== Composition and lyrics ==
=== "Loser" ===
"Loser" is a pop rock song, composed in the key of F-sharp minor and is set in time signature of common time with a tempo of 121 BPM.

Created as the second track after "Number Nine", Yonezu aimed for a very different sound in comparison. He thought of ways to incorporate hip-hop and rapping elements within a rock framework, resulting in "Loser". He cited Beck's "Loser" as an inspiration for the track.

Yonezu described it as a song "to the losers", those who feel insecure about themselves. Stemming from feelings of self-hatred, he wished listeners who resonate with its message can "look ahead and keep going". Yonezu expressed that "as long as I'm a loser, I should turn that into music", hoping he could help at least one person see themselves in a more positive light.

On the second verse, the line, "Ian and Kurt are people of the past / There's no point in raising a middle finger anymore", directly references Ian Curtis and Kurt Cobain, rock artists notable for being "rebel icons" in the history of the genre as well as their personal struggles. Yonezu admitted he sympathized with their rebellious nature, but felt it was counterintuitive following their ways, instead prioritizing personal health and autodidacticism as ways of self-improvement.

=== "Number Nine" ===
"Number Nine" is an electropop song, composed in the key of D major and is set in time signature of common time with a tempo of 110 BPM.

It was the first out of the three tracks created as the theme song for Louvre No. 9 – Manga, The Ninth Art, where Yonezu and fellow producer Mabanua handled the arrangement. He made the song with the intention of following in the footsteps of Bremen while evolving from the album's sound.

The song's concept originated from Yonezu's personal association of bande dessinée with deserts, citing French artist Jean Giraud's usage of deserts as motifs in his work as an influence. He described the desert as a harsh place that is seemingly difficult for life to flourish in. He further elaborated that it represents an empty future where people who persist through everyday life can still find joy and hope in the midst of a bleak environment. "Objectively speaking, that kind of landscape seems like a state where there is no hope whatsoever. But even in a chaotic situation, I think the people who cling to life there are actually quite cheerful", Yonezu stated. The beginning line of the song, "I was walking through the desert / Tokyo Tower visible from a distance", sets the stage for the fictional future that he depicts. He was heavily inspired by the exhibition for the concept, touching on the "unbroken succession" of art being passed down for people to cherish for generations. "As a result of that unbroken succession, don't we get to live enjoying what's at the forefront of it all? [...] the music and art I made, for instance, [may] be passed on, and people will still be making new things", Yonezu expressed.

One of the lines in the song, "The future and the past are pulling against each other", juxaposes the desolute world with those who lived earnestly in life. Yonezu mentioned that toeing the line between two extremes was a value he considered when writing the song. He sees accounting for elements of both notions as his "ideal way of life" in terms of balanced living. He added, "There aren't many people who can stop and think about what's on the opposite side, and ask themselves, 'Where do these two things connect?' That's why I've always wanted to do that kind of thing".

=== "Amen" ===
"Amen" is a J-pop song, composed in the key of E minor and is set in time signature of common time with a tempo of 88 BPM.

The single's B-side was the final track conceived as a foray into a "darker" sound. He explained that he thought of the concept of prayer as "the last thing left after you exhaust various options for dealing with a problem", knowing one must persevere in the environment and situation they were born into.

== Commercial performance ==
On the Oricon Singles Chart, the single peaked at number two and lasted for a total of 45 weeks. On the Combined Singles Chart, the single peaked at number 16 and lasted for 24 weeks.

Following the release of its music video, "Loser" debuted on the Billboard Japan Hot 100 at number 15 for the week of September 21, 2016. Two weeks later on October 5, it rose and peaked at number three after the single's release, becoming his highest-charting song at the time. "Number Nine" also debuted and peaked at number 29 the same week.

In May 2018, "Loser" was used in a commercial for the Honda Jade in Japan. Following this, it re-entered the Japan Hot 100 top ten at number six for the week of May 23, over a year and a half after its peak. It lasted a total of 128 weeks on the chart, making it his third-longest charting song there, behind "Eine Kleine" and "Lemon" respectively.

== Music videos ==
=== "Loser" ===
The music video for "Loser" was released on September 15, 2016. Yonezu announced on social media a day prior that he had plans for a "little project", where hints of the video's screening location were periodically posted. It premiered as a surprise projection on a building wall located in Shibuya Center Street. Directed by Fumiko Hirano, it features Yonezu dancing in an empty classroom, a flooding staircase, a tunnel, and on a building rooftop where it later rains. He was taught dancing by choreographer Tomohiko Tsujimoto in two to three weeks despite having no prior experience, in which he described the experience as "hellish".

=== "Number Nine" ===
Directed by Atsunori Higashiichi, it features Yonezu drawing various 3D illustrations using infrared markers and a head-mounted display in a virtual space. It was included on the "Number Nine" limited edition single. Only a trailer was uploaded and the full video was never released online.

== Track listing ==
All tracks are written by Kenshi Yonezu.

CD single / digital download / streaming – standard edition
No.	Title	Length
1.	"Loser"	4:05
2.	"Number Nine" (ナンバーナイン)	4:23
3.	"Amen"	4:34
Total length:		13:02

DVD – "Number Nine" limited edition
No.	Title	Director	Length
1.	"Loser" (music video)	Fumiko Hirano
2.	"Number Nine" (music video)	Atsunori Higashiichi

== Credits and personnel ==
Credits adapted from Apple Music.

- Kenshi Yonezu – vocals, songwriter, guitar, arranger, producer
- Masaki Hori – drums (track 1)
- Yū Sutō – bass (track 1)
- Koichi Tsutaya – arranger (track 1), producer (track 1)
- Manabu Yamaguchi / Mabanua – arranger (track 2)
- Kazutaka Minemori – guitar technician (track 1)
- Masato Murakami – drum technician (track 1)
- Yasuhisa Kataoka – mixing engineer, recording engineer (track 1)
- Tōru Takayama – mixing engineer (track 2)
- Yujirō Yonetsu – recording engineer (track 2)

== Charts ==
=== Weekly charts ===
Weekly chart performance for "Loser"
Chart (2016–2019)	Peak position
Japan (Japan Hot 100)	3
Japan (Oricon) with "Number Nine"	2
Japan Combined Singles (Oricon) with "Number Nine"	16

Weekly chart performance for "Number Nine"
Chart (2016–2017)	Peak position
Japan (Japan Hot 100)	29
Japan (Oricon) with "Loser"	2
Japan Combined Singles (Oricon) with "Loser"	16

=== Year-end charts ===
2017 year-end performance for "Loser"
Chart (2017)	Position
Japan (Japan Hot 100)	62

2018 year-end performance for "Loser"
Chart (2018)	Position
Japan (Japan Hot 100)	16

2019 year-end performance for "Loser"
Chart (2019)	Position
Japan (Japan Hot 100)	41

== Certifications ==
Certifications for "Loser"
Region	Certification	Certified units/sales
Japan (RIAJ) Digital	3× Platinum	750,000^{*}
Streaming
Japan (RIAJ)	Platinum	100,000,000^{†}
^{*} Sales figures based on certification alone.^{†} Streaming-only figures based on certification alone.
