= Starbites =

2026 video game

- Developer: IkinaGames
- Publisher: Nippon Ichi Software
- Platforms: Nintendo Switch; PlayStation 5; Xbox Series X/S; Windows; Nintendo Switch 2
- Release: Switch, PS5, Xbox Series X/S; JP: October 16, 2025; WW: May 21, 2026; Windows; May 21, 2026; Switch 2; July 14, 2026
- Genre: Role-playing
- Mode: Single-player

Starbites is a turn-based role-playing game developed by IkinaGames and published by Nippon Ichi Software. It was released in Japan on October 16, 2025, for Nintendo Switch, PlayStation 5 and Xbox Series X/S. It received a western release for the same platforms, as well as for Windows, on May 21, 2026. A Nintendo Switch 2 version was released on July 14, 2026.

Starbites follows a Mecha salvager named Lukida, who attempts to escape the planet Bitter. The game received mixed to positive reviews. The setting of the game was inspired by the music video of Dune, according to the director of the game.

== Reception ==
Reception

Aggregate scores
Aggregator	Score
Metacritic	(PS5) 68/100 (NS) 59/100
OpenCritic	35% recommend

Review score
Publication	Score
Nintendo Life	4/10

The PlayStation 5 and Nintendo Switch versions of Starbites both received "mixed or average" reviews from critics, according to the review aggregation website Metacritic. Fellow review aggregator OpenCritic assessed that the game received fair approval, being recommended by 35% of critics.
