= Pale Blue (song) =

2021 single by Kenshi Yonezu

Single by Kenshi Yonezu

from the album Lost Corner
- Language: Japanese
- B-side: "Daydream"; "Shinigami"
- Released: May 31, 2021
- Studio: ABS Recording and Bunkamura Studios, Tokyo
- Genre: J-pop
- Length: 13:00
- Label: Sony Music Labels
- Songwriter: Kenshi Yonezu
- Producer: Kenshi Yonezu

Kenshi Yonezu singles chronology
"Paprika" (2020)	"Pale Blue" (2021)	"Pop Song" (2022)

Music videos
- "Pale Blue" on YouTube
- "Shinigami" on YouTube

"Pale Blue" is a song by Japanese singer-songwriter Kenshi Yonezu. It was released as a digital single on May 31, 2021, through Sony Music Labels, before a physical CD release was issued on June 16. It reached number one on the Billboard Japan Hot 100.

== Background and release ==
Of the three songs included, "Yume Utsutsu" was written first. In August 2020, Yonezu received a collaboration offer and began production. "Pale Blue" was written after three rejections, and Yonezu said it was "the most difficult time in [his] career to date". "Shinigami" was written with the relief that "Pale Blue" had been completed in time for the deadline. Yonezu made it while thinking about how it would be popular or whether it would make people laugh.

"Pale Blue" was written and first released as the theme song for the drama Rikokatsu. The artist visuals were posted prior to the musical released. On April 30, 2021, the jacket artwork, said by Yonezu to depict "the moment of falling in love", was released and a special website was opened. The single was released with three editions: puzzle, ribbon, and regular. The first limited edition contains a "Pale Blue Fragrance" card with an original scent created with the image of the song, as well as a "Pale Blue" card where Yonezu's illustrations and signature appear when immersed in water. "Pale Blue Letter" was also included as a surprise package. Additionally, to coincide with the advance release of "Pale Blue", distribution of Yonezu's past songs began on TikTok.

A music video directed by Tomokazu Yamada for "Pale Blue" was released on June 4, 2021. Yamada had previously directed the music videos for "Lemon", "Uma to Shika", and "Campanella". Koharu Sugawara, who had previously appeared as a dancer for Yonezu's performance of "Lemon" at the 69th NHK Kōhaku Uta Gassen, appeared in the music video. A music video for the short version of "Shinigami" was released on June 24. Set in a rakugo vaudeville theater, Yonezu plays the rakugo storyteller, the Shinigami, and the audience.

== Composition ==
"Pale Blue" is a love song characterized by the classical sound created by the use of acoustic instruments such as string instruments and the piano. The two choruses are reminiscent of the baroque style, and then the rhythm shifts from four beats to a 6/8 waltz rhythm after a brief triptych. The lyrics are in present tense after the meter change.

"Yume Utsutsu" is a song with motifs of anger and anxiety. According to music journalist Tomonori Shiba, the chords and melody have elements of modern jazz, and the groove is physically pleasing.

"Shinigami" was composed because Yonezu liked the sound of the phrase Ajarakamokuren tekerettsu no pā (アジャラカモクレン テケレッツのパー) in the rakugo story Shinigami; he said that he made it into music.

== Critical reception ==
Yusuke Nagano, writing for Rhythm&Drum Magazine, points out the drums in "Pale Blue", saying that the "highly textured closed rim shot that makes you feel like you're playing at close range". He also said that the sixteenth note kick sounds "add a refreshing dynamism". Masateru Hori played the drums for "Pale Blue". Music critic Atsushi Shikano praised the rhythmic shifts, saying "it creates order in the modulation of the song, and it makes you fall in love with the dynamic cruelty of love".

Comedian Hikaru Ijūin talked about "Shinigami" during his radio program and said that he "can't describe the sound of rakugo, or the feeling of Shinigami, but [the song] reproduces the feeling of an old man talking about Shinigami. Music journalist Tomonori Shiba said that the important point of "Shinigami" was that "of course, there is rakugo, but it starts with the 'sound of footsteps' and ends with the 'sound of blowing out candle flames' and there are other sounds ... that accompany one's physicality".

== Commercial performance ==
The title track "Pale Blue", which was pre-released on May 31, 2021, sold 84,385 downloads in its first week and placed first on the Billboard Japan Download Songs released on June 9. It also debuted at second on the Billboard Japan Hot 100. In the second week, it placed first on Download Songs for a second week and ranked third on Billboard Japan Hot 100. When the physical CD was released, it recorded 161,252 initial sales and ranked second on the Billboard Japan Top Single Sales released June 23. Additionally, in the same week's Japan Hot 100, it had the highest score of a solo artist in 2021 and placed first. It also placed first for the third week in that week's Download Songs. The following week, "Pale Blue" again topped the Download Songs, and ranked third in the Japan Hot 100. Additionally, "Shinigami", digitally released that week, placed second in the Japan Hot 100, and "Yume Utsutsu" rose from sixth to third place.

"Pale Blue" was certified Platinum for the physical release and Gold for digital sales by the Recording Industry Association of Japan in June 2022. It was also certified Platinum for streaming in September 2022.

== Track listing ==
All tracks are written by Kenshi Yonezu; all tracks are arranged by Yonezu and Yuta Bandoh.

No.	Title	Length
1.	"Pale Blue"	4:57
2.	"Daydream" (ゆめうつつ)	5:04
3.	"Shinigami" (死神)	3:00
Total length:		13:01

== Charts ==
=== Weekly charts ===
Weekly chart performance for "Pale Blue"
Chart (2021)	Peak position
Global 200 (Billboard)	52
Japan (Japan Hot 100)	1
Japan (Oricon)	1
Japan Combined Singles (Oricon)	1

Weekly chart performance for "Daydream"
Chart (2021)	Peak position
Global Excl. US (Billboard)	173
Japan (Japan Hot 100)	31

Weekly chart performance for "Shinigami"
Chart (2021)	Peak position
Global 200 (Billboard)	148
Japan (Japan Hot 100)	12

=== Year-end charts ===
Year-end chart performance for "Pale Blue"
Chart (2021)	Position
Japan (Japan Hot 100)	30

== Certifications ==
Certifications for "Pale Blue"
Region	Certification	Certified units/sales
Japan (RIAJ) Physical	Platinum	250,000^{^}
Japan (RIAJ) Digital	Gold	100,000^{*}
Streaming
Japan (RIAJ)	Platinum	100,000,000^{†}
^{*} Sales figures based on certification alone.^{^} Shipments figures based on certification alone.^{†} Streaming-only figures based on certification alone.

Certifications for "Shinigami"
Region	Certification	Certified units/sales
Streaming
Japan (RIAJ)	Gold	50,000,000^{†}
^{†} Streaming-only figures based on certification alone.
