= 61st Japan Record Awards =

2019 Japanese music awards ceremony

- Date: 30 December 2019
- Hosted by: Tao Tsuchiya, Shinichiro Azumi

Television/radio coverage
- Network: TBS

The 61st Japan Record Awards (第61回日本レコード大賞, Dai Rokujū Ichi-kai Nihon Rekōdo Taishō) was held on 30 December 2019.

== Presents ==
- Tao Tsuchiya
- Shinichiro Azumi (TBS Announcer)

== Winners ==
=== Grand Prix ===
- Foorin – Paprika
  - Artist: Foorin
  - Lyrics: Kenshi Yonezu
  - Composition & arranger: Kenshi Yonezu
  - Producer: Kenshi Yonezu

=== Excellent Work Awards ===
- Little Glee Monster – ECHO
- Daichi Miura – Katasumi
- Keyakizaka46 – Kuroi Hitsuji
- AKB48 – Sustainable
- Junretsu – Junretsu no Happy Birthday
- Nogizaka46 – Sing Out!
- Kiyoshi Hikawa – Daijoubu
- Hinatazaka46 – Doremisolatido
- DA PUMP – P.A.R.T.Y. ~Universe Festival~
- Foorin – Paprika

=== Album of the Year ===
- The Yellow Monkey – 9999

=== Excellence Album Award ===
- Eikichi Yazawa – Itsuka, Sono Hi ga Kuru Hi made...
- Aimyon – Momentary Sixth Sense
- King Gnu – Sympa
- Rimi Natsukawa – Churasa Kanasa

=== Special Award ===
- Masaki Suda
- Mariya Takeuchi
- Kenshi Yonezu

=== Best Vocal Performance ===
- Yukino Ichikawa

=== Best New Artist ===
- Beyooooonds

=== New Artist Awards ===
- Ryouta Kaizou
- Leon Niihama
- BEYOOOOONDS
- Ryuusei

=== Composition Award ===
- Takafumi Iwasaki (Kiyoshi Hikawa – "Genkai Toppa×Survivor")

=== Lyrics Award ===
- Shinichi Ishihara (Takeshi Matsubara – "Saihoku Cinema" / Yukino Ichikawa – "Yuki Renge")

=== Arrangement Award ===
- Takuya Ōhashi, Shintarō Tokita (Sukima Switch – "Seishun")

=== Planning Award ===
- Hiroko Moriguchi – Gundam Song Covers
- Kaho Takada – Daikoukai 2020 ~Koi yori Suki ja, Dame desuka? ver.~
- Naomi Chiaki – Bigin
- Ran Itō – My Bouquet
- Jaejoong – Love Covers
- Golden Bomber – Reiwa

=== Japan Composer’s Association Award ===
- Midori Oka

=== Achievement Award ===
- Katsuko Kanai
- Mari Sono
- Munetaka Hakamada
- Billy BanBan

=== Lifetime Achievement Award ===
- Mieko Arima
- Yuya Uchida
- Kazuya Senke
- Kenichi Hagiwara
