= Spinning Globe =

2023 single by Kenshi Yonezu

Single by Kenshi Yonezu

from the album The Boy and the Heron and Lost Corner
- Language: Japanese
- Released: July 26, 2023
- Genre: Chamber pop
- Length: 4:33
- Label: Sony Japan
- Songwriter: Kenshi Yonezu
- Producers: Kenshi Yonezu; Yuta Bandoh

Kenshi Yonezu singles chronology
| "Tsuki wo Miteita (Moongazing)" (2023) | "Spinning Globe" (2023) | "Sayonara, Mata Itsuka!" (2024) |

Music video
- "Spinning Globe" on YouTube

"Spinning Globe" (Japanese: 地球儀, Hepburn: Chikyūgi; lit. 'Globe') is a song by Japanese singer-songwriter Kenshi Yonezu. It was released as Yonezu's 14th single on July 26, 2023, by Sony Music Records. The song served as the theme song for Hayao Miyazaki's animated fantasy film The Boy and the Heron (2023).

== Background ==
"Spinning Globe" was written as the theme song for The Boy and the Heron, Hayao Miyazaki's first full-length directorial work in a decade. It was announced on July 14, 2023, the day of the film's release, as the film had a policy of keeping the content and cast confidential prior to its release. The song was constructed with a small chamber orchestra and Yonezu, who provided the piano track for the song.

Miyazaki asked Yonezu to write the theme song four years prior to the film's release after he heard Foorin's "Paprika", which Yonezu had produced, on the radio. Yonezu commented that he grew up watching Miyazaki's films, and "Spinning Globe" is a song about The Boy and the Heron but also a song to give back to Miyazaki.

It has been about four years now since I was approached about the project. At first, I was surprised and at the same time bewildered, asking ‘Why me?’. It turned out that Miyazaki-san had heard the Foorin version of my song ‘Paprika’ on the radio, which triggered him to drop the handkerchief to me. I received five volumes’ worth of storyboards and an explanation from Miyazaki-san himself and gingerly began the writing process. It now feels like such a long time ago. — Kenshi Yonezu

== Release and promotion ==
The song was released a month after Yonezu's last single, "Tsuki wo Miteita (Moongazing)", and roughly a year after his last film theme song, "M87" for Shin Ultraman. It was first performed on July 1 and 2 at Yokohama Arena during Yonezu's tour, Kusou, as an unreleased new song, though details were not revealed. Advance distribution of the song began on July 17, 2023. The jacket of the work was extracted from an original frame of The Boy and the Heron and chosen by Yonezu. The single was released on July 26 with two versions: first version, which has a moss green hard cover with three-dimensional leaf patterns and images of herons, and a regular version with a soft cover; both have a photobook with documentary photos as well as a conversation Yonezu and Toshio Suzuki, the film's producer.

The music video, filmed in Yakushima and directed by Hiroshi Okuyama, premiered on July 26. Two days later, a video of a conversation between Yonezu and Masaki Suda, who voiced the Grey Heron in the film and had previously collaborated with Yonezu on "Haiiro to Ao", was released. A live video of a surprise performance of "Spinning Globe" at the final concert of Yonezu's tour, Kusou, was released. Animation from Takeshi Honda, the animation director for the film, was included in the beginning and end of the video.

== Commercial performance ==
On July 17, 2023, the day of its release, the song ranked first on all distribution sites with a total of 25 titles for daily and real-time rankings. It also ranked first on the Oricon Daily Digital Singles Chart. It ranked third on the Billboard Japan Hot 100 released on July 26, and first on the Billboard Japan Download Songs. "Spinning Globe" also ranked first on the Oricon Weekly Digital Single ranking, Yonezu's 14th song to do so, breaking his own record for the most number-one digital singles. In the Billboard Japan Hot 100 of the following week announced on August 2, the song rose to second place and kept its first place ranking on Download Songs and second place ranking on Hot Animation. It also kept its first place ranking on the Oricon Weekly Digital Single ranking.

== Charts ==
=== Weekly charts ===
Weekly chart performance for "Spinning Globe"
| Chart (2023) | Peak position |
|---|---|
| Global Excl. U.S (Billboard) | 143 |
| Japan Hot 100 (Billboard) | 2 |
| Japan Hot Animation (Billboard Japan) | 2 |
| Japan (Oricon) | 3 |
| Japan Combined Singles (Oricon) | 2 |
| Japan Anime Singles (Oricon) | 1 |
| South Korea Download (Circle) | 142 |

=== Monthly charts ===
Monthly chart performance for "Spinning Globe"
| Chart (2023) | Position |
|---|---|
| Japan (Oricon) | 7 |
| Japan Anime Singles (Oricon) | 1 |

=== Year-end charts ===
Year-end chart performance for "Spinning Globe"
| Chart (2023) | Position |
|---|---|
| Japan (Japan Hot 100) | 85 |
| Japan Hot Animation (Billboard Japan) | 18 |
| Japan (Oricon) | 75 |

== Certifications ==
Certifications for "Spinning Globe"
| Region | Certification | Certified units/sales |
|---|---|---|
| Japan (RIAJ) Physical | Gold | 100,000^{^} |
| Japan (RIAJ) Digital | Gold | 100,000^{*} |
Streaming
| Japan (RIAJ) | Platinum | 100,000,000^{†} |
^{*} Sales figures based on certification alone.^{^} Shipments figures based on certification alone.^{†} Streaming-only figures based on certification alone.
