= Lost Corner =

Studio album by Kenshi Yonezu
- Released: August 21, 2024
- Length: 70:58
- Language: Japanese
- Label: Sony Japan
- Producers: Kenshi Yonezu; Daiki Tsuneta; Yuta Bandoh; Yaffle; Mabanua; Tomi Yo

Kenshi Yonezu chronology
| Stray Sheep (2020) | Lost Corner (2024) |

Singles from Lost Corner
- 1. "Pale Blue" Released: June 16, 2021; 2. "Pop Song" Released: February 7, 2022; 3. "M87" Released: May 18, 2022; 4. "Kick Back" Released: November 23, 2022; 5. "Lady" Released: March 21, 2023; 6. "Tsuki o Miteita" Released: June 26, 2023; 7. "Spinning Globe" Released: July 26, 2023; 8. "Sayonara, Mata Itsuka!" Released: April 8, 2024; 9. "Mainichi" Released: May 27, 2024

Lost Corner is the sixth studio album by Japanese singer-songwriter Kenshi Yonezu, released on August 21, 2024, through Sony Music Records. It included number-one singles "Pale Blue", a theme for 2021 television series Rikokatsu and "Kick Back", an opening theme for 2022 anime series Chainsaw Man; the latter became the first Japanese-language song to be certified gold by the Recording Industry Association of America (RIAA). The album also features the theme song "Spinning Globe", which was used for Hayao Miyazaki's anime film The Boy and the Heron (2023) and "Tsuki wo Miteita - Moongazing" which was used as the ending theme for the Square Enix video game "Final Fantasy XVI" (2023).

Commercially, Lost Corner debuted atop both the Oricon Albums Chart and the Billboard Japan Hot Albums charts. It sold 555,177 copies as of 2024, and was later certified double platinum by Recording Industry Association of Japan (RIAJ). In support of the album, Yonezu embarked on the concert tour Junk throughout Japan in 2025, as well as in Asia, Europe, and North America.

== Accolades ==
Awards and nominations for Lost Corner
| Ceremony | Year | Category | Result | Ref. |
|---|---|---|---|---|
| CD Shop Awards | 2025 | Package Design Award | Won | |
| Japan Gold Disc Award | 2025 | Best 5 Albums | Won | |
| Music Awards Japan | 2025 | Album of the Year | Nominated | |

== Track listing ==
All tracks are written by Kenshi Yonezu.

Lost Corner track listing
| No. | Title | Producer(s) | Length |
|---|---|---|---|
| 1. | "Red Out" | Yonezu | 2:31 |
| 2. | "Kick Back" | Yonezu; Daiki Tsuneta | 3:14 |
| 3. | "Margherita + Aina the End" (マルゲリータ + アイナ・ジ・エンド) | Yonezu | 3:03 |
| 4. | "Pop Song" | Yonezu; Yuta Bandoh | 3:19 |
| 5. | "Shinigami" (死神) | Yonezu; Bandoh | 3:00 |
| 6. | "Mainichi – Every Day" (毎日) | Yonezu; Yaffle | 3:02 |
| 7. | "Lady" | Yonezu; Mabanua | 3:28 |
| 8. | "Yumeutsutsu – Daydream" (ゆめうつつ) | Yonezu; Bandoh | 5:05 |
| 9. | "Sayonara, Mata Itsuka! – Sayonara" (さよーならまたいつか!) | Yonezu; Tomi Yo | 3:21 |
| 10. | "Tomaremiyo – Stop Look Both Ways" (とまれみよ) | Yonezu | 2:50 |
| 11. | "Lens Flare" | Yonezu | 2:54 |
| 12. | "Tsuki o Miteita – Moongazing" (月を見ていた) | Yonezu; Bandoh | 4:13 |
| 13. | "M87" (M八七) | Yonezu; Bandoh | 4:23 |
| 14. | "Pale Blue" | Yonezu; Bandoh | 4:57 |
| 15. | "Garakuta – Junk" (がらくた) | Yonezu; Tomi Yo | 3:57 |
| 16. | "Yellow Ghost" | Yonezu | 2:52 |
| 17. | "Post Human" | Yonezu | 4:04 |
| 18. | "Chikyūgi – Spinning Globe" (地球儀) | Yonezu; Bandoh | 4:34 |
| 19. | "Lost Corner" | Yonezu | 3:43 |
| 20. | "Ohayo" (おはよう) | Yonezu | 2:20 |
| Total length: | | | 70:58 |

== Charts ==
=== Weekly charts ===
Weekly chart performance for Lost Corner
| Chart (2024) | Peak position |
|---|---|
| Japanese Albums (Oricon) | 1 |
| Japanese Combined Albums (Oricon) | 1 |
| Japanese Hot Albums (Billboard Japan) | 1 |
| US Top Current Album Sales (Billboard) | 41 |
| US World Albums (Billboard) | 14 |

=== Monthly charts ===
Monthly chart performance for Lost Corner
| Chart (2024) | Position |
|---|---|
| Japanese Albums (Oricon) | 1 |

=== Year-end charts ===
2024 year-end chart performance for Lost Corner
| Chart (2024) | Position |
|---|---|
| Japanese Albums (Oricon) | 3 |
| Japanese Combined Albums (Oricon) | 2 |
| Japanese Hot Albums (Billboard Japan) | 2 |

2025 year-end chart performance for Lost Corner
| Chart (2025) | Position |
|---|---|
| Japanese Hot Albums (Billboard Japan) | 10 |

== Certifications ==
Certifications for Lost Corner
| Region | Certification | Certified units/sales |
|---|---|---|
| Japan (RIAJ) | 2× Platinum | 500,000^{^} |
^{^} Shipments figures based on certification alone.
