= Fullkawa Honpo =

- Also known as: Fullkawa-P, Fullkawa Head.Q.Music
- Born: March 3, 1980; Osaka Prefecture, Japan
- Origin: Japan
- Genres: Rock, pop, post-rock, electronica
- Occupations: Singer-songwriter; Vocaloid producer
- Instruments: Guitar, vocals
- Years active: 2009–2015; 2021-Present
- Labels: Balloom; Space Shower Network; DONAI paris
- Website: fullkawahonpo.jp

Fullkawa Honpo (古川本舗, Furukawa Hompo; "Fullkawa Head Office"), is a Japanese musician, who began releasing Vocaloid music under the name Fullkawa-P (古川P) in 2009. After self-releasing Vocaloid music and self-cover extended plays using his own voice, he debuted under independent label Balloom using the name Fullkawa Honpo in 2011.

== Biography ==
Fullkawa Honpo is from Osaka Prefecture, Japan. When he was 14, he joined his first band, a visual kei band specialising in metal. He joined a guitar rock group at university, and after finishing university decided to continue to be a musician, having difficulties finding other types of work. He continued with that band, and the group moved to Tokyo for their CD debut. However, when Fullkawa Honpo was in his mid 20s, the band split before they managed to debut, and he remained in Tokyo to work as a designer. Frustrated with the band, he began working as a Vocaloid producer, and started uploading songs to Nico Nico Douga in June 2009. He took his Vocaloid moniker Fullkawa-P from a local carpark business called Furukawa Parking (古川パーキング), thinking that something ending in "P" would be suitable, in the style of many other Vocaloid producers.

Fullkawa Honpo continued to release Vocaloid songs in 2009 and 2010, with his songs "Piano Lesson," "Mugs" and "Alice" all receiving over 100,000 views ("Alice" receiving over 400,000), as well as self-releasing Vocaloid music on CD, beginning with the Piano Lesson EP in September 2009. In March 2011, Fullkawa Honpo and seven other musicians created Balloom, an independent music label for Internet musicians to widen their musical opportunities. His debut album Alice in Wonderword was released two months later, and featured mostly re-recordings of his Vocaloid songs, collaborating with vocalists such as Kahimi Karie and Maki Nomiya. Fullkawa Honpo was nominated for the best Indies Artist at the Billboard Japan Awards in 2011.

In 2012, Fullkawa Honpo moved to Space Shower Music, and released his second album Girlfriend from Kyoto on November 7, 2012. His third album Soup was released on November 6, 2013. After releasing his fourth album in October 2014, Hail Against the Barn Door, Fullkawa Honpo was unsure what he wanted to do next musically, and decided to stop releasing music as Fullkawa Honpo at the end of 2015.

In 2020, after a five-year absence, he announced the continuation of new releases under the Fullkawa Honpo name, along with a new label, DONAI paris. His first new single since then released February 2021.

== Discography ==
=== Studio albums ===
List of albums, with selected chart positions
Title	Album details	Peak positions	
Title	Album details	JPN	TWN East Asian (Note: Position was taken from 2013 week 5 for Girlfriend from Kyoto.)
Alice in Wonderword	Released: May 16, 2011; Label: Balloom; Formats: CD, digital download	42	—
Girlfriend from Kyoto (ガールフレンド・フロム・キョウト, Gārufurendo furomu Kyōto)	Released: November 7, 2012; Label: Space Shower Network; Formats: CD, digital download	32	12
Soup	Released: November 6, 2013; Label: Space Shower Network; Formats: CD, digital download	50	—
Hail Against the Barn Door	Released: October 22, 2014; Label: Space Shower Network; Formats: CD, digital download	37	—
"—" denotes items which did not chart in that region.

=== Compilation album ===
Title	Album details
Peams EP	Vocaloid era compilation album; Released: September 4, 2011; Label: Self-produced; Formats: 2CD

=== Live album ===
Title	Album details
.Callc.	Released: December 2, 2015; Label: Space Shower Network; Formats: 2CD

=== Extended plays ===
Title	Album details
Singalong	Released: May 16, 2010; Label: Self-produced; Formats: CD
Singalong II	Released: September 4, 2010; Label: Self-produced; Formats: CD
Singalong 3	Released: November 19, 2011; Label: Self-produced; Formats: CD
Singalong 4	Released: September 4, 2013; Label: Space Shower; Formats: CD
(I'm Home) EP	Released: August 7, 2013; Label: Space Shower; Formats: Rental CD
Singalong 5	Released: May 18, 2014; Label: Space Shower; Formats: CD
Singalong 6	Released: September 28, 2014; Label: Space Shower; Formats: CD
Singalong 7	Released: March 1, 2015; Label: Space Shower; Formats: CD

==== Vocaloid extended plays ====
Title	Album details
Piano Lesson EP	Released: September 6, 2009; Re-released: February 8, 2010; Label: Self-produced; Formats: CD
(The Army for Your) Envy EP	Released: February 7, 2010; Label: Self-produced; Formats: CD
Alta Mugs EP	Released: January 16, 2011; Label: Self-produced; Formats: CD
The Great Escape from American Brutal Moshpit Soundtrack	Released: September 4, 2011; Label: Self-produced; Formats: CD
Fullkawa Bootleg 2011	Remix EP; Released: September 4, 2011; Label: Self-produced; Formats: CD

=== Vocaloid songs ===
List of Vocaloid songs uploaded to Niconico Douga under the name Fullkawa-P, and the Vocaloids they were sung by.
Title	Year	Notes
"Moonside e Yōkoso" (ムーンサイドへようこそ; "Welcome to Moonside") (Hatsune Miku)	2009	Re-recorded for Alice in Wonderword featuring vocals by Chibita.
"Hanare, Banare" (はなれ、ばなれ; "Scattered") (Hatsune Miku)	2009	Re-recorded for Girlfriend from Kyoto featuring vocals by Bazupanda.
"Piano Lesson" (ピアノ・レッスン, Piano Ressun) (Hatsune Miku)	2009	Received over 100,000 views. Re-recorded twice for Alice in Wonderword: one version with vocals by Kahimi Karie, and another version featuring Maki Nomiya.
"Crawl" (Hatsune Miku)	2009	Re-recorded for Alice in Wonderword featuring vocals by Acane_madder.
"Alice" (Hatsune Miku)	2009	Received over 400,000 views. Re-recorded for Alice in Wonderword featuring vocals by Meiko Haigou.
"Good Morning Emma Sympson" (Hatsune Miku)	2009	First half of the song written in approximated English. Re-recorded for Alice in Wonderword featuring vocals by Madoka Ueno.
"Envy." (Megurine Luka)	2009	Re-recorded for Alice in Wonderword featuring vocals by Nanako Hoshino from the band Yasashikute.
"Girlfriend" (Hatsune Miku)	2009	Re-recorded for Girlfriend from Kyoto featuring vocals by Yukari Yamazaki from the band Kukikodan.
"Super Nova" (スーパー・ノヴァ, Sūpā Nova) (Miki)	2009	Re-recorded for Alice in Wonderword featuring vocals by Mikito.
"Alice (Reprise)" (Hatsune Miku)	2010	
"Piano Lesson (Asp-Mix)" (Hatsune Miku)	2010	
"Mugs" (Hatsune Miku)	2010	Received over 100,000 views. Re-recorded for Alice in Wonderword featuring vocals by 630.
"Guriguri Megane to Gekkōchū" (グリグリメガネと月光蟲; "Googly Glasses and Moonbeam Bugs") (Hatsune Miku Dark)	2010	Re-recorded for Alice in Wonderword featuring vocals by Kuwagata-P.
"Yoru to Nijiiro" (夜と虹色; "Night and Rainbow Color") (Hatsune Miku & Hatsune Miku Dark)	2010	
"Kaleido Swimming (Soundagree Mix)" (カレイドスイミング, Kareidosuimingu) (Hatsune Miku)	2010	Captain Mirai and SoundAgree mash-up.

=== Video album ===
Title	Album details
.Callv.	Released: December 2, 2015; Label: Space Shower Network; Formats: DVD
