= Santa Maria (Kenshi Yonezu song) =

Single by Kenshi Yonezu

from the album Yankee
- B-side: "Hyakki Yakō"; "Fue Fukedomo Odorazu"
- Released: May 15, 2013
- Recorded: 2013; Sunrise Studio, Minato, Tokyo; Studio Somewhere, Meguro, Tokyo; Freedom Studio, Shinjuku, Tokyo
- Genre: Alternative rock
- Length: 5:36
- Label: Universal Music Japan
- Songwriter: Kenshi Yonezu
- Producer: Kenshi Yonezu

Kenshi Yonezu singles chronology
"Santa Maria" (2013)	"Mad Head Love" (2013)

Music video
- "サンタマリア" on YouTube

"Santa Maria" (Japanese: サンタマリア) is the debut major label single by Japanese musician Kenshi Yonezu, released on May 15, 2013. It was Yonezu's first release on Universal Music Japan, and features a musical shift to using a live band.

== Background and development ==
In May 2012, Yonezu released Diorama, his first album and first to use his own vocals. It was released under independent label Balloom. The album was written, produced and illustrated entirely by Yonezu himself. The album was commercially successful, debuting at number six on Oricon's albums charts, and was one of the most sold independently released albums of 2012 in Japan.

After finishing the album, Yonezu spent many months at home. After completing a childhood dream of releasing an album, Yonezu felt burnt out and was unsure what to do next. He first created the song "Hyakki Yakō," and intended to make a music video for it. He later did not feel it was the right direction, so he did not release it. In August 2012, Yonezu uploaded a song "'Anata wa Minikui" (あなたは醜い; "You're Ugly") to SoundCloud, but it was later deleted before his major debut.

Yonezu first announced the single on Twitter on March 9, 2013. The announcement of the label, Universal Music Japan, came on April 2, 2013.

== Writing and production ==
"Santa Maria"
The start of "Santa Maria," featuring a dissonant noise and the start of the first verse. The sound and transition was praised by critics.

"Santa Maria" was made approximately a year after Diorama, and was inspired by Yonezu's time spent by himself at home. The song and its B-side "Hyakki Yakō" were the first time Yonezu worked with a band. He decided to work with a band for his major debut as he enjoyed a band sound, and was searching for musicians who had similar ideas as himself. He felt that he would have difficulties finding these kinds of people outside of a major label, so he took up an offer from Universal. Another reason he decided to work with band members was to get used to other people's opinions and nuances added to his music, something he did not have to do when making Vocaloid music, or when he worked on Diorama. Yonezu, while finding it difficult to express his opinions and ideas properly, also felt constricted by working by himself, as too much freedom caused little work to get done. He likened working with a band to being "thrown into an unknown country." "Santa Maria" was written about his decision of what to do musically, after a long period of being unsure how to progress after Diorama. He took the phrase "Santa Maria" for the song due to its associations with holiness and purity to illustrate this new-found direction.

For the single, Yonezu worked with bassist Katsuhiro Mafune (bassist in Yui's band Flower Flower), drummer Bobo of 54-71 and pianist Tetsuya Hataya. Yonezu created the songs by first recording demos, then asking band members to perform the song as they liked for a few takes. Despite this, Yonezu found the final versions of songs did not differ much from the demos. The songs "Santa Maria" and "Hyakki Yakō" were recorded in the same sessions with the band, but "Fue Fukedomo Odorazu" was recorded by Yonezu separately. The version of "Santa Maria" featured on Yankee is different, and features newly recorded vocals. He found the first demo recordings of "Santa Maria" difficult to listen to, as he was not used to other people's input.

"Santa Maria" begins with a dissonant sound, which then leads into the song. Yonezu used it to contrast to the rest of the song, because he feels that "beautiful things need to be dirty." The original demo featured an even more dissonant sound. He wanted to make "something beautiful, about looking forward in life." The song is a mid-tempo song, featuring a band and strings arrangement, as well as additional instruments and programmed sounds. The lyrics talk about a relationship between the writer and a woman, Santa Maria. They are together, but separated by a "pane of glass." The writer tires of the walls between them and wants them to go together "towards that light." He says that one day an azure cactus will bloom, and the glass will collapse, but at the end of the song he says that neither has happened. Despite that, there is "a single candle" burning in Santa Maria, and he still wants them to go "towards that light."

The B-side "Hyakki Yakō" was written before "Santa Maria," Yonezu wanted to make a song with a lot of effort and punch, and wrote ironic and sarcastic lyrics. Yonezu later felt an uplifting, un-sarcastic song would be a better thing to release, so created "Santa Maria". The title refers to Hyakki Yagyō, a Japanese folklore concept where demons parade in towns on summer nights. The lyrics talk about late night drinking, and says that we have become the demons in the parade today.

== Promotion and release ==
The song made its radio debut on April 8, on the Tokyo FM radio show School of Lock! Yonezu made radio appearances in May and June on radio shows School of Lock!, Mucomi+Plus on JOLF and Suiyō Nico Radi on Nico Nico Douga's online radio station. Interviews with Yonezu to promote the single were featured in the Japanese music and fashion magazines An An, Cutie, Rolling Stone Japan, Musica, Nikkei Entertainment!, Rockin' On Japan and Zipper.

On June 7, 2013, the song was read aloud by poetry reciter and model Saki Satō on the NTV music program Music Dragon.

Yonezu performed the song for the first time on Internet streaming service Ustream on June 15, 2013.

== Music video ==
The music video was the first time Yonezu revealed himself on a release. It also features a picture book personally illustrated by him (pictured).

The music video was first uploaded on April 23, 2013, and was directed by Perfume and Sakanaction collaborator Kazuaki Seki. It is Yonezu's first non-animated music video, and features himself personally, the first time he was shown himself on one of his musical releases. The video also features a picture book, filled with personally drawn illustrations of the song. Yonezu has been illustrating his songs since his 2009 Vocaloid releases on Nico Nico Douga.

The video is shot in a grey room, where Yonezu wearing a flower wreath and long hair covering his face sits down to read a picture book. The picture book illustrates the song, showing pictures of two hands on top of each other, and a couple separated in every moment of their lives by a glass pane. Yonezu walks around the room, and finds holes in the room, with light shining through them. Further along there is a barren tree, with the lyrics of the song hanging on it. Yonezu sits under the tree with the book. The girl in the picture book leaves the drawings, leaving the male character alone. Yonezu starts to frantically claw at the holes of light, and falls down. On the other side of the holes of light, Yonezu performs the song with a band and an orchestra.

== Reception ==
Commercially, the single debuted at number 12 on Oricon's singles chart, selling 11,000 copies in its first week. It charted in the top 200 for six weeks, selling a total of 14,000 copies overall.

The single was received favorably by music reviewers. It was picked as an editor's choice release by OK Music, which described the song as having "grand vocals riding on an elegant and magnificent sound," and praised the hopeful-sounding lyrics, and how they "swell in determination and confidence." Kotaro Matsumura of Rockin' On called the single a masterpiece, praising how carefully every chosen word and sound was. Akihiro Tomita of What's In also praised the lyrics, calling Yonezu a "real pop musician" and enjoyed how intricate the sound programming was, noting the "warm" band sound and "heavenly strings."

== Track listing ==
All tracks are written by Kenshi Yonezu.

No.	Title	Length
1.	"Santa Maria"	5:36
2.	"Hyakki Yakō" (百鬼夜行, "Demon Parade")	4:38
3.	"Fue Fukedo Odorazu" (笛吹けども踊らず, "We Have Piped, But You Don't Dance")	3:06
Total length:		13:22

DVD
No.	Title	Length
1.	"Santa Maria (music video)"	5:36
2.	"Santa Maria (picture book)"	5:36

== Personnel ==
Personnel details were sourced from "Santa Maria"'s liner notes booklet.

Performance credits

- Bobo – drums (#1–2)
- Yuichiro Goto Strings Group – strings (#1)
- Tetsuya Hataya – piano (#1)
- Katsuhiro Mafune – bass (#1–2)
- Kenshi Yonezu – guitar, vocals (#1–3)

Visuals and imagery

- Masato – hair
- Shiro O. – styling
- Osamu Oohashi – design
- Kazuaki Seki – music video director (DVD #1)
- Kenshi Yonezu – illustration

Technical and production

- Eiji Makino – mixing (#1–2)
- Yasuji Maeda – mastering
- Yoichi Miyazaki – mixing (#3), recording (#1–2)
- Kenshi Yonezu – arrangement, lyrics, music, programming (#1–3)

== Chart rankings ==
Charts (2013)	Peak position
Japan Billboard Adult Contemporary Airplay	50
Japan Billboard Japan Hot 100	26
Japan Oricon weekly singles	12
Japan Oricon monthly singles	50

=== Sales and certifications ===
Chart	Amount
Oricon physical sales	14,000

== Release history ==
Region	Date	Format	Distributing Label	Catalogue codes
Japan	April 8, 2013	Radio add date	Universal Music Japan	
Japan	April 24, 2013	Ringtone	Universal Music Japan	
Japan	May 15, 2013	Digital download	Universal Music Japan	
Japan	May 29, 2013	CD, CD+DVD, CD+illustration book, rental CD	Universal Music Japan	UMCK-5435, UMCK-9622, PDCS-5901
Worldwide	October 26, 2013	Digital download	Universal Music Japan	
