= Kick Back (song) =

Single by Kenshi Yonezu

from the album Lost Corner
- B-side: "Hazukashikutte Shōganē"
- Released: October 12, 2022
- Genre: Industrial rock
- Length: 3:13
- Label: Sony Japan
- Songwriter: Kenshi Yonezu
- Producers: Kenshi Yonezu; Daiki Tsuneta

Kenshi Yonezu singles chronology
"M87" (2022)	"Kick Back" (2022)	"Lady" (2023)

Music videos
- "Kick Back" on YouTube
- "Kick Back" (Frost Children Remix) on YouTube

"Kick Back" (stylized in all caps) is a song by Japanese musician Kenshi Yonezu. It was released as a single digitally by Sony Music Records on October 12, 2022, as well as in three physical editions: a regular CD edition, a video edition, and a chainsaw edition. The song serves as the opening theme for the anime series Chainsaw Man.

== Background and release ==
This song is used as one of the opening theme for the anime series Chainsaw Man. Yonezu was in charge of the theme song for the TV anime My Hero Academia, the first opening of the second season. It has been about five years since the theme "Peace Sign".

King Gnu and Millennium Parade member Daiki Tsuneta participated in the production and arrangement with Yonezu. "Kick Back" also samples Morning Musume's 2002 song "Sōda! We're Alive".

On September 19, 2022, the preview for Chainsaw Man was released, with "Kick Back" being used. In addition, it was also performed live for the first time at the Tokyo Metropolitan Gymnasium performance on the first day of "2022 Tour / Henshin", which was held on September 23. In addition, the arranger Daiki Tsuneta appeared at the tour final at Saitama Super Arena on October 27.

The CD single was released in three formats: a chainsaw board, a video board, and a regular board, and it also came with a "Kenshi Yonezu 2023 Tour / Fantasy" advance lottery application serial number and a corporate privilege sticker.

In the United States, the single was released by Milan Records.

"Kick Back" became the first song with Japanese lyrics to be certified both gold and platinum by the Recording Industry Association of America (RIAA). The song achieved gold certification in 2023 and platinum certification in 2025.

== Music video ==
Prior to the song's release, the music video premiered on October 25, featuring Yonezu and Daiki Tsuneta. It was directed by Yoshiyuki Okuyama, who also worked on the music video for "Kanden" and Yonezu's promotional photos. In the video, Yonezu devotes himself to training in a gym alongside Tsuneta. After a montage of vigorous working out and Yonezu shown with large muscular arms, Yonezu runs off a treadmill into a field and then onto a road, where he is hit by a truck, which launches him through the air and into doing parkour across shipping containers and city buildings. A group of men dressed in similar attire appear and run alongside him through an industrial site and across a quarry. The video ends with Yonezu shown back in the gym, walking on a treadmill alongside Tsuneta, with a security camera revealing Tsuneta is not really there.

The opening sequence for the Chainsaw Man anime plays tribute to several films, including Reservoir Dogs, The Texas Chain Saw Massacre, Pulp Fiction, Sadako vs. Kayako, No Country for Old Men, Fight Club, Messiah of Evil, Once Upon a Time in Hollywood, Don't Look Up, Jacob's Ladder, Constantine, and The Big Lebowski. The other references are the manga Goodbye, Eri and Fire Punch by the same author, the song "Sōda! We're Alive" by Morning Musume and the anime Neon Genesis Evangelion. The sequence was directed and storyboarded by Shingo Yamashita.

== Track listing ==
All tracks are written by Kenshi Yonezu.

CD single / digital download / streaming
No.	Title	Arrangement	Length
1.	"Kick Back"	Kenshi Yonezu; Daiki Tsuneta	3:13
2.	"Hazukashikutte Shōganē" (恥ずかしくってしょうがねえ; lit. "I Can't Help Being Embarrassed")	Yonezu	3:41
3.	"Kick Back" (anime edit)	Yonezu; Tsuneta	1:27
Total length:			8:21

Limited edition DVD
No.	Title	Length
1.	"TV Anime Chainsaw Man Non-Credit Opening Movie"	1:39
2.	"M87" (music video)	4:46
Total length:		14:46

== Personnel ==
Credits adapted from the liner notes

- Kenshi Yonezu – vocals, songwriter
- Daiki Tsuneta – guitar, bass
- Shun Ishiwaka – drums
- Jun Miyakawa – organ
- Shuntaro Tsuneta – violin
- Sonoko Muraoka – cello
- Haruka / Haruka to Miyuki – chorus
- Chainsaw: 放生多加男, 石川猛
- Yuichi Kitamura – Drum Technician
- Ryuma Annaka – recording engineer
- Masahito Komori – recording engineer, mixing engineer
- Randy Merrill – mastering engineer

== Accolades ==
Awards and nominations for "Kick Back"
Ceremony	Year	Award	Result	Ref.
Anime Grand Prix	2023	Best Theme Song	5th place	
Crunchyroll Anime Awards	2024	Best Anime Song	Nominated	
Crunchyroll Anime Awards	2024	Best Opening Sequence	Nominated	
Japan Expo Awards	2023	Daruma for Best Opening	Won	
Music Awards Japan	2025	Best Japanese Song in Europe	Nominated	
Music Awards Japan	2025	Best Japanese Song in North America	Nominated	
Reiwa Anisong Awards	2022	Best Work Award	Nominated	
Reiwa Anisong Awards	2022	Best Anime Song Award	Won	
Reiwa Anisong Awards	2022	Composition Award (Note: Kenshi Yonezu credited as nominee.)	Nominated	
Reiwa Anisong Awards	2022	Arrangement Award (Note: Kenshi Yonezu and Daiki Tsuneta credited as nominees.)	Nominated	

== Charts ==
=== Weekly charts ===
Weekly chart performance for "Kick Back"
Chart (2022–2025)	Peak position
Canada Hot 100 (Billboard)	100
Global 200 (Billboard)	13
Hong Kong (Billboard)	16
Japan Hot 100 (Billboard)	1
Japan Hot Animation (Billboard Japan)	1
Japan (Oricon)	1
Japan Combined Singles (Oricon)	1
Singapore Regional (RIAS)	15
South Korea (Circle)	87
Taiwan (Billboard)	4
UK Rock & Metal (Official Charts)	12
US Hot Rock & Alternative Songs (Billboard)	26
US World Digital Song Sales (Billboard)	3

=== Monthly charts ===
Monthly chart performance for "Kick Back"
Chart (2022–2025)	Position
Japan (Oricon)	4
South Korea (Circle)	92

=== Year-end charts ===
2022 year-end chart performance for "Kick Back"
Chart (2022)	Position
Japan (Japan Hot 100)	30
Japan Hot Animation (Billboard Japan)	9
Japan (Oricon)	25
Japan Digital Singles (Oricon)	4

2023 year-end chart performance for "Kick Back"
Chart (2023)	Position
Global 200 (Billboard)	149
Japan (Japan Hot 100)	4
Japan Hot Animation (Billboard Japan)	2
Japan Combined Singles (Oricon)	9
US Hot Rock & Alternative Songs (Billboard)	81

2024 year-end chart performance for "Kick Back"
Chart (2024)	Position
Japan (Japan Hot 100)	56

2025 year-end chart performance for "Kick Back"
Chart (2025)	Position
Japan Streaming Songs (Billboard Japan)	75

== Certifications ==
Certifications for "Kick Back"
Region	Certification	Certified units/sales
Japan (RIAJ) CD single	Platinum	250,000^{^}
Japan (RIAJ) Download	Gold	100,000^{*}
Mexico (AMPROFON)	Gold	70,000^{‡}
New Zealand (RMNZ)	Gold	15,000^{‡}
United States (RIAA)	Platinum	1,000,000^{‡}
Streaming
Japan (RIAJ)	Diamond	500,000,000^{†}
^{*} Sales figures based on certification alone.^{^} Shipments figures based on certification alone.^{‡} Sales+streaming figures based on certification alone.^{†} Streaming-only figures based on certification alone.

== Release history ==
Release dates and formats for "Kick Back"
Region	Date	Format	Version	Label	Ref.
Various	October 12, 2022	Digital download; streaming	Standalone	Sony Japan	
Various	November 23, 2022	Digital download; streaming	Regular	Sony Japan	
Japan	November 23, 2022	CD+DVD	Video	Sony Japan	
Japan	November 23, 2022	CD+chainsaw necklace	Chainsaw	Sony Japan	
Japan	November 23, 2022	CD	Regular	Sony Japan	

== Frost Children remix ==
To commemorate the streaming release of Chainsaw Man: Compilation, which brings together all 12 episodes of the TV anime, a remix version of "Kick Back" by Frost Children with a visualizer was released on September 5, 2025.
