= Peace Sign (Kenshi Yonezu song) =

2017 single by Kenshi Yonezu

Single by Kenshi Yonezu

from the album Bootleg
- Language: Japanese
- B-side: "Neighbourhood"; "Yumekui Shōjo"
- Released: June 21, 2017
- Studio: ABS Recording
- Genre: J-pop; anime song
- Length: 16:32
- Label: Sony Music
- Songwriter: Kenshi Yonezu
- Producer: Kenshi Yonezu

Kenshi Yonezu singles chronology
"Orion" (2017)	"Peace Sign" (2017)	"Dune" (2017)

Music video
- "Peace Sign" on YouTube

"Peace Sign" (Japanese: ピースサイン, Hepburn: Pīsu Sain) is a song by Japanese singer-songwriter Kenshi Yonezu. It was released as a single by Sony Music on June 21, 2017. The song served as the first opening theme for the second season of the Japanese anime series My Hero Academia.

== Background and release ==
The demo that became the prototype for "Peace Sign" was produced in spring 2016. Yonezu then accepted an offer from the producers of My Hero Academia to provide music. Yonezu referred to Kōji Wada's "Butter-Fly", the opening theme song for Digimon Adventure, as an example.

One of the B-sides, "Yumekui Shōjo", is a self-cover of Yonezu's Vocaloid song "Shajō no Yumekui Shōjo", released under the name Hachi in 2010. Yonezu was initially reluctant to self-cover songs he released using Vocaloid, but later thought that it might be okay. "Yumekui Shōjo" is slower than the original song.

"Peace Sign" was released during the first broadcast for the second season of My Hero Academia. The version used during the broadcast was released as "Peace Sign (TV edit.)" on music distribution services on April 29, 2017. It is an arrangement that uses the chorus more than the version recorded on the single. The single was released on June 21, 2017, with three versions. The Peace version came with a DVD containing the non-credit opening of My Hero Academia, and the Hero version came with a special trading card featuring series protagonist Izuku Midoriya. Yonezu designed the jackets for the Peace and Hero versions. The first release, regardless of version, contained advance applications for tickets of Yonezu's live tour Fogbound, which started in November of that year.

"Peace Sign" became Yonezu's second song and the third overall certification for a song with Japanese lyrics since Chainsaw Man's "Kick Back", to be certified Gold by the Recording Industry Association of America (RIAA). The song achieved Gold certification in 2026.

== Music video ==
The music video for "Peace Sign" was released on Yonezu's YouTube channel on June 7, 2017. The video exceeded 1 million views on YouTube within 24 hours of its release, and on September 1, it was reported on Yonezu's website that the video had surpassed 100 million views, Yonezu's fifth music video to reach this milestone. It exceeded 200 million views on August 24, 2020.

On December 18, 2017, a special music video for "Peace Sign" using footage from My Hero Academia was released on Toho Animation's YouTube channel.

== Track listing ==
All tracks are written by Kenshi Yonezu.

No.	Title	Length
1.	"Peace Sign" (ピースサイン)	3:57
2.	"Neighbourhood"	3:57
3.	"Yumekui Shōjo" (ゆめくいしょうじょ)	4:43
4.	"Peace Sign" (instrumental)	3:55
Total length:		16:32

== Credits and personnel ==
Credits adapted from the liner notes.

- Kenshi Yonezu – composer, arranger, performer, songwriter, producer, vocals (tracks 1–3)
- Yōhei Makabe – guitar (tracks 1-2)
- Yū Sutō – bass (tracks 1–2)
- Masaki Hori – drums
- Akira Miyake – vocal director (tracks 1, 3)
- Masahito Komori – vocal recording engineer, vocal mixing engineer (tracks 1, 3)
- Shōichirō Ishī – recording engineer (tracks 2-3)
- Goetz Botzenhardt – mixing engineer (track 3)
- Ichiyo Izawa – piano (track 3)
- Kazutaka Minemori – guitar technician
- Yoshio Arimatsu – drum technician
- Chris Gehringer – mastering engineer

== Accolades ==
Awards and nominations for "Peace Sign"
Ceremony	Year	Award	Result	Ref.
2nd Crunchyroll Anime Awards	2018	Best Opening	Won	
32nd Japan Gold Disc Awards	2018	Best 5 Songs by Download	Won	
40th Anime Grand Prix	2018	Best Theme Song	6th place	

== Charts ==
=== Weekly charts ===
Chart (2017)	Peak position
Japan Hot 100 (Billboard)	1
Japan (Oricon)	2
Japan Hot Animation (Billboard)	1
Japan Anime Singles (Oricon)	1

=== Monthly charts ===
Monthly chart performance for "Peace Sign"
Chart (2017)	Peak position
Japan (Oricon)	6

=== Year-end charts ===
Chart (2017)	Position
Japan (Japan Hot 100)	14
Japan (Oricon)	70

Chart (2018)	Position
Japan (Japan Hot 100)	31

Chart (2019)	Position
Japan (Japan Hot 100)	76

== Certifications ==
Region	Certification	Certified units/sales
Japan (RIAJ) Physical	Gold	100,000^{^}
Japan (RIAJ) Digital	3× Platinum	750,000^{*}
United States (RIAA)	Gold	500,000^{‡}
Streaming
Japan (RIAJ)	2× Platinum	200,000,000^{†}
^{*} Sales figures based on certification alone.^{^} Shipments figures based on certification alone.^{‡} Sales+streaming figures based on certification alone.^{†} Streaming-only figures based on certification alone.
