= Yankee (album) =

Studio album by Kenshi Yonezu
- Released: April 23, 2014
- Recorded: 2012–2014
- Genre: Alternative rock
- Length: 64:07
- Language: Japanese
- Label: Universal Sigma
- Producer: Kenshi Yonezu

Kenshi Yonezu chronology
Diorama (2012)	Yankee (2014)	Bremen (2015)

Singles from Yankee
- 1. "Santa Maria" Released: May 15, 2013; 2. "Mad Head Love" Released: October 23, 2013

External videos
- 『YANKEE』 クロスフェード
- 「リビングデッド・ユース」 on YouTube
- 「WOODEN DOLL」 on YouTube
- 「アイネクライネ」 on YouTube
- 「サンタマリア」 on YouTube
- 「MAD HEAD LOVE」 on YouTube

Yankee (stylized in all caps) is the second studio album by Japanese musician Kenshi Yonezu and fourth original album release. It was released on April 23, 2014, followed by his first live concert on June 27, 2014. It was selected as best album of the year by iTunes in 2014.

== Background and development ==
In May 2012, Yonezu released Diorama, his third album and first to use his own vocals. It was released under independent label Balloom. The album was written, produced and illustrated entirely by Yonezu himself. The album was commercially successful, debuting at number six on Oricon's albums charts, and was one of the most sold independently released albums of 2012 in Japan.

A year later, Yonezu debuted under major label Universal Music Japan with the single "Santa Maria." Two of the songs were performed with a band, the first time Yonezu had worked like this. The single reached number 12 on chart provider Oricon's singles chart. This was continued in October 2013 with the single "Mad Head Love" / "Poppin' Apathy."

A week after his second single's release, Yonezu released his first Vocaloid song in two and a half years, called "Donut Hole" (ドーナツホール, Dōnatsu Hōru) using Gumi vocals. It was the first time he used a live band on a Vocaloid song. This song became a part of Yankee, with vocals recorded by Yonezu himself. followed by the first series of concerts in his career.

== Writing and production ==
The album features the songs "Mad Head Love," "Hyakki Yakō" and "Santa Maria" from the two singles released before the album, as well as 12 unpublished songs. The version of "Santa Maria" featured on Yankee has re-recorded vocals that differ from the single version. Much of the album was recorded in January and February 2014. Yonezu announced on Twitter that the album mastering was finished on February 19, 2014.

When beginning recording sessions for Yankee, Yonezu did not have a concrete concept in mind. This was so he could have a different approach to Diorama, which was based on the concept of a town. On Diorama he had recorded all the songs by himself at home, but wanted something different for his next album. He decided to work with a band, as he felt he needed to get used to dealing with other people's input and opinions. Yonezu decided to take up an offer from major label Universal, in order to find people with similar musical ideas as himself. He attempted to make his songs sound universal and easy to understand, compared to Diorama, which focused on expressing the town concept. Hence, he tended to write introspective lyrics, to feel closer to his listeners. While not a concept, a word that Yonezu intentionally used in many songs was curse (呪い, noroi), and wrote about invisible forces that hold back people's lives.

"Hyakki Yakō" was the first song written for the album in mid-2013, and was Yonezu's attempt to write a song with a lot of punch and effort. He did not feel the sarcastic lyrics fitted a debut single, so created "Santa Maria" soon after as a result. "Santa Maria" and "Hyakki Yakō" were the first time Yonezu worked on music together with a live band. Yonezu considered "Santa Maria" an important song, as it was made during a period of insecurity about what to do next musically.

"Mad Head Love" was written later in 2013, and featured Yonezu's childhood friend Hiroshi Nakajima as a guitarist. It was written about Yonezu's feelings when composing music, and gave the song a theme of "communication friction." "Mad Head Love" was written at the same time as another song, "Poppin' Apathy," and the two songs were based on the theme of a Möbius strip. Yonezu tried to write the song "Donut Hole" like a Shōnen manga. The song "Eine Kleine" was written specifically for Tokyo Metro, and features lyrics about looking forward despite adversity. While most songs were recorded with a band, "Karma City" was an instrumental created digitally, like his Vocaloid tracks. "Living Dead Youth" was the final song written for the album, and was inspired by Yonezu rethinking his life during elementary and junior high school.

Yonezu called the album Yankee after the initial meaning of an English immigrant to New England during the Colonial period of the United States, as becoming a major label musician, he felt like an "immigrant from the Internet," or from the "island of Vocaloids." At first, he just liked the sound of the word Yankee, so looked up all the definitions of the word.

== Cover and artwork ==
Much like Diorama (2012), "Santa Maria" (2013) and "Mad Head Love" / "Poppin' Apathy" (2013), Yankee features artwork drawn personally by Yonezu. One of the three editions of the album features an 80-page supplementary illustration booklet. Though Yonezu said he had not started working on the cover artwork on February 19, 2014, the cover was unveiled on February 26, 2014. The cover features a deer's skull on a background of patterned circles and swirls. Above the skull is a smiling character holding onto both antlers. Yonezu dubbed this character Yankikkii (ヤンキッキー).

== Promotion and release ==
The song "Donut Hole" was available to perform at karaoke in Japan from February 26, 2014. On March 14, a music video was released for the song "Living Dead Youth," directed by Hidenobu Tanabe. The song "Eine Kleine" was used as the Tokyo Metro commercial song, and was written especially for the advertisement campaign. The song is planned to be used in the campaign from April 1, 2014, until March 31, 2015. On April 1, the song's music video was released on YouTube and Nico Nico Douga. It featured artwork drawn by Yonezu himself, much like the videos for his songs "Go Go Yūreisen" and "Vivi" from Diorama. The song was released as a preceding download from Yankee on April 9, 2014, on iTunes.

On April 18, 2014, Space Shower broadcast a special half-hour programme called Kenshi Yonezu Special, directly followed by a half-hour compilation of his music videos. The music video for "Eine Kleine" was a Space Shower Power Push! video, being on heavy rotation in April 2014. A live action music video for "Wooden Doll" was released on April 23.

To promote the album, interviews with Yonezu were featured in the music and fashion magazines 7 Pia, Barfout!, Chokichoki, Flying Postman Press, Musica, Rolling Stone Japan and Tokyo Head Line. Yonezu made radio broadcasts on Mucomi Plus on April 15, Nack5 on April 16 and FM Yokohama on April 16 and 23.

Yonezu appeared at the Niconico Chōkaigi 3 convention at Makuhari Messe on April 27, to talk about the album. On June 27, 2014, Yonezu will hold his first live concert, Kenshi Yonezu Premium Live: Kaeri no Kai (米津玄師 Premium Live “帰りの会”; "Closing Meeting of the Day") The majority of Yankee was performed, except for "Hana ni Arashi", "Kanpuku" and "Karma City". Yonezu also performed songs from his debut album Diorama, as well as his song featuring his own vocals on the Vocaloid album Official Orange, "Yūen Shigai".

== Track listing ==
All tracks are written by Kenshi Yonezu.

No.	Title	Length
1.	"Living Dead Youth" (リビングデッド・ユース Ribingudeddo Yūsu)	4:10
2.	"Mad Head Love"	3:36
3.	"Wooden Doll"	4:06
4.	"Eine Kleine" (アイネクライネ Aine Kuraine, "A Little")	4:48
5.	"Melancholy Kitchen" (メランコリーキッチン Merankorī Kitchin)	3:38
6.	"Santa Maria (Album Version)"	5:33
7.	"Hana ni Arashi" (花に嵐 "Flower in a Storm")	4:43
8.	"Umi to Sanshōuo" (海と山椒魚 "The Sea and a Salamander")	5:12
9.	"Shitodo Seiten Daimeiwaku" (しとど晴天大迷惑 "The Great Problem of Being Drenched in Fine Weather")	3:47
10.	"Ganpuku" (眼福 "Sight for Sore Eyes")	4:24
11.	"Horafuki Nekoyarō" (ホラ吹き猫野郎 "Bragging Cat Dude")	4:32
12.	"Toxic Boy"	3:57
13.	"Hyakki Yakō" (百鬼夜行, "Demon Parade")	4:36
14.	"Karma City"	3:44
15.	"Donut Hole" (ドーナツホール Dōnatsu Hōru)	3:24
Total length:		64:07

DVD
No.	Title	Length
1.	"Living Dead Youth"	4:10
2.	"Eine Kleine"	4:55

== Personnel ==
Personnel details were sourced from Yankee's liner notes booklet.

Performance credits

- Bobo – drums (#6, #13)
- Tetsuya Hataya – piano (#6)
- Masaki Hori – drums (#1–5, #7–11, #15)
- Junpei Komiyama – drums (#12)
- Katsuhiro Mafune – bass (#6, #13)
- Hiroshi Nakajima – guitar (#1–3, #7–11)
- Kei Sugimoto – bass (#8)
- Yu Suto – bass (#1–5, #7, #9–11, #15)
- Koichi Tsutaya – piano (#4)
- Kenshi Yonezu – guitar, vocals
- Yuichiro Goto Strings Group – strings (#6)

Visuals and imagery

- Yū Nagahashi – design
- Osamu Ōhashi – design
- Kenshi Yonezu – illustration, comic

Technical and production

- Masuo Arimatsu – drum technician (#1–3, #5, #9–10, #15)
- Yasuhisa Kataoka – recording, mixing (#3–5, #9–11, #15)
- Eiji Makino – mixing (#6, #13)
- Kazutaka Minemori – guitar technician (#1–2, #4, #9–11)
- Yoichi Miyazaki – recording (#6, #13)
- Masato Murakami – drum technician (#4, #11)
- Hiromichi "Tucky" Takiguchi – mastering
- Nobuyuki Terakawa – guitar technician (#3, #5, #7–8)
- Ayaka Toki – recording, mixing (#1, #14)
- Koichi Tsutaya – co-arrangement (#4)
- Masashi Uramoto – recording, mixing (#2, #7, #8, #12)
- Kenshi Yonezu – arrangement, lyrics, music, production, programming

== Chart rankings ==
Chart (2014)	Peak position
Japan Oricon daily albums	2
Japan Oricon weekly albums	2
Japan Oricon monthly singles	6
Japan Oricon yearly albums	81
Chart (2019)	Peak position
Taiwan East Asia Weekly	1

=== Sales ===
Chart	Amount
Oricon physical sales	129,000

== Release history ==
Region	Date	Format	Distributing Label	Catalogue codes
Japan	April 23, 2014	CD, CD/Photobook, CD/DVD, digital download	Universal	UMCK-1478, UMCK-9667, UMCK-9668
South Korea	April 24, 2014	digital download	Universal	—N/a
Japan	May 10, 2014	Rental CD	Universal	UMCK-1478, UMCK-9667, UMCK-9668
Taiwan	May 23, 2014	CD	Universal	0642484
