= Sayonara, Mata Itsuka! =

2024 single by Kenshi Yonezu

Single by Kenshi Yonezu

from the album Lost Corner
- Language: Japanese
- Released: April 8, 2024
- Genre: J-pop
- Length: 3:27
- Label: Sony Japan
- Songwriter: Kenshi Yonezu
- Producer: Kenshi Yonezu

Kenshi Yonezu singles chronology
"Spinning Globe" (2023)	"Sayonara, Mata Itsuka!" (2024)	"Mainichi" (2024)

Music video
- "Sayonara, Mata Itsuka!" on YouTube

"Sayonara, Mata Itsuka!" (Japanese: さよーならまたいつか!; lit. 'Goodbye, see you someday!') is a song recorded by Japanese singer Kenshi Yonezu. Released on April 8, 2024, via Sony Music Records, it serves as the theme song for the asadora series The Tiger and Her Wings.

== Background ==
On April 1, 2024, the song was announced as the theme song for the asadora series The Tiger and Her Wings and to be released on April 8.

== Commercial performance ==
The song debuted at number 2 on the Billboard Japan Hot 100 for the week on April 20, 2024.

== Music video ==
The music video was directed by Tomokazu Yamada. It features Kenshi Yonezu in a shoulder-padded power suit and is set at an A&W diner and unwinds in a whirlwind of events preceded by a reverse playback of the video.

== Live performances ==
Yonezu debuted the performance of "Sayonara, Mata Itsuka!" at the 75th NHK Kōhaku Uta Gassen on December 31, 2024, as part of special shows. It was set as a spinoff of The Tiger and Her Wings that Sairi Ito (portrayed Tomoko Inotsume) called out "Yone-san" to appear. Yonezu performed the song on the large staircase as appearing on the series alongside casts of the series who danced on the background. At the end Yonezu and Ito stood side by side and gave a peace sign, before saying "Happy New Year" during waving their hands.

== Accolades ==
Awards and nominations for "Sayonara, Mata Itsuka!"
Ceremony	Year	Award	Result	Ref.
Japan Gold Disc Award	2025	Best 3 Songs by Download	Won	
MTV Video Music Awards Japan	2025	Best Solo Artist Video (Japan)	Won	

== Charts ==
=== Weekly charts ===
Weekly chart performance for "Sayonara, Mata Itsuka!"
Chart (2024)	Peak position
Global 200 (Billboard)	152
Japan Hot 100 (Billboard)	2
Japan Combined Singles (Oricon)	4
South Korea Download (Circle)	140

=== Year-end charts ===
2024 year-end chart performance for "Sayonara, Mata Itsuka!"
Chart (2024)	Position
Japan (Japan Hot 100)	21
Japan Digital Singles (Oricon)	2

2025 year-end chart performance for "Sayonara, Mata Itsuka!"
Chart (2025)	Position
Japan (Japan Hot 100)	47

== Certifications ==
Certifications for "Sayonara, Mata Itsuka!"
Region	Certification	Certified units/sales
Japan (RIAJ) Digital	Gold	100,000^{*}
Streaming
Japan (RIAJ)	2× Platinum	200,000,000^{†}
^{*} Sales figures based on certification alone.^{†} Streaming-only figures based on certification alone.
