= Bremen (album) =

Studio album by Kenshi Yonezu
- Released: October 7, 2015
- Genres: J-pop; Alternative Rock
- Length: 62:00
- Label: Universal Sigma

Kenshi Yonezu chronology
Yankee (2014)	Bremen (2015)	Bootleg (2017)

Singles from Bremen
- 1. "Flowerwall" Released: January 14, 2015; 2. "Unbelievers" Released: September 2, 2015

Bremen is the third album by Kenshi Yonezu. It was released by Universal Sigma on October 7, 2015.

== Background ==
The album contained Yonezu's previously released singles "Flowerwall" and "Unbelievers", as well as "Mirage Song", which he had performed on Twitcasting.

The title was inspired by Will-O-Wisp and the musicians of Bremen. Will-O-Wisp illustrates turning one's back on a prosperous life and going into the darkness; the musicians of Bremen grow jaded of their current life and decide to head to Bremen, but never reach the city. Yonezu wished to express the journey's importance over the destination.

The album was released with three versions: an art book version with original illustrations by Yonezu; a video version containing a DVD with music videos; and a regular version with only a CD. The first production of all versions included a serial number for an advance ticket lottery for his live tour Ongakudan, to be held from January 2016.

Yonezu won the Excellence Album Award at the 57th Japan Record Awards for Bremen.

== Track listing ==
All tracks are written by Kenshi Yonezu, with collaborators noted.

No.	Title	Writer(s)	Length
1.	"Unbelievers" (アンビリーバーズ)	Kōichi Tsutaya	4:42
2.	"Fluorite" (フローライト)		4:42
3.	"Saijōei" (再上映; "Rerun")		3:32
4.	"Flowerwall"	Kōichi Tsutaya	4:58
5.	"Atashi wa Yūrei" (あたしはゆうれい "I'm a Ghost")		4:03
6.	"Will o' Wisp" (ウィルオウィスプ)		5:07
7.	"Undercover"		3:58
8.	"Neon Sign"		4:06
9.	"Metronome" (メトロノーム)	Kōichi Tsutaya	4:19
10.	"Ame no Gairo ni Yakōchū" (雨の街路に夜光蟲 "Luminescent Bug on a Rainy Street")		3:49
11.	"Cinderella Gray" (シンデレラグレイ)		4:11
12.	"Mirage Song" (ミラージュソング)		4:53
13.	"Hopeland" (ホープランド)		5:01
14.	"Blue Jasmine"	Kōichi Tsutaya	4:39
Total length:			62:00

== Personnel ==
- Kenshi Yonezu – vocals, guitar
- Hiroshi Nakajima – guitar (tracks 2, 5, 6, 8, 11–12)
- Yū Sutō – bass (tracks 2–3, 6, 8, 10–14)
- Teru Horimasa – drums (tracks 2–8, 10–14)
- Masuo Arimatsu – drums (track 1)
- Kōichi Tsutaya – piano, Hammond organ (tracks 1, 4, 9, 14)
- Ichiyo Izawa – piano (tracks 10, 12)
- Tetsuya Ochiai – violin (track 9)
- Toshiyuki Muranaka – cello (track 9)

== Charts ==
Chart (2015)	Peak position
Japanese Albums (Oricon)	1
Japanese Hot Albums (Billboard Japan)	1

== Certifications ==
Region	Certification	Certified units/sales
Japan (RIAJ)	Gold	100,000^{^}
^{^} Shipments figures based on certification alone.
