= Bootleg (Kenshi Yonezu album) =

Studio album by Kenshi Yonezu
- Released: November 1, 2017
- Recorded: 2016–2017
- Studios: ABS Recording; Bunkamura Studio; Prime Sound Studio Form; Oorong Tokyo Studio; aLive Recording Studio
- Genres: J-Pop; Alternative rock
- Length: 60:08
- Label: Sony Music Entertainment Japan
- Producers: Kenshi Yonezu; Koichi Tsutaya; Mabanua; Daiki Tsuneta

Kenshi Yonezu chronology
Bremen (2015)	Bootleg (2017)	Stray Sheep (2020)

Bootleg (stylized in all caps) is the fourth album by Kenshi Yonezu, released on November 1, 2017. It is his first album with Sony Music and won the Album of the Year award at the 60th Japan Record Awards.

== Background ==
August 30, 2017 is the ten year anniversary of Hatsune Miku, while Magical Mirai is the large Vocaloid concert held by Crypton Future Media. Crypton Future Media invited Yonezu to write "Dune" as the birthday song for Miku, and the theme song for Magical Mirai 2017. Miku's version is included in "Hatsune Miku "Magical Mirai 2017" OFFICIAL ALBUM ", which peaked No.13 in Oricon. Yonezu self-covers the song in "Bootleg". The song reviews the history of Vocaloid with references to previous songs in the lyrics and metaphorizes the desertion of the Vocaloid community as a sand planet, and soon became viral in the Vocaloid fandom. Crypton Future Media also invited some notable Vocaloid producers, such as Wowaka and N-buna, to write songs which were then collected as the birthday celebrating album "Re:Start", which peaked No.6 on Oricon.

Yonezu considered titling the album Dune, as he was confident that he could make beautiful music, and wanted to prove it to people. He changed the album's name titled, Bootleg.

== Singles ==
"Dune" is the theme song of Magical Mirai 2017, with the album version having Yonezu as the lead vocalist with Hatsune Miku in the background rather than the other way around in the single release. The song, "Peace Sign", was used as the opening theme for the second season of the series My Hero Academia. The song, "Orion", was used as the ending theme for the series March Comes In like a Lion. The ending theme song, "Uchiage Hanabi", was used for the film Fireworks.

== Track listing ==
No.	Title	Length
1.	"Hien" (飛燕 "A Swallow in Flight")	4:03
2.	"LOSER"	4:03
3.	"Peace Sign" (ピースサイン, Pīsu Sain)	3:58
4.	"Dune" (砂の惑星 "Dune" (lit. "Planet of Sand"), featuring Hatsune Miku)	4:00
5.	"orion"	4:41
6.	"Kaijū no Māchi" (かいじゅうのマーチ "Monster March")	4:55
7.	"Moonlight"	3:44
8.	"Shunrai" (春雷 "Spring Thunder")	4:48
9.	"Fogbound" (featuring Ikeda Elaiza)	4:15
10.	"Number Nine" (ナンバーナイン; Nanbā Nain)	4:21
11.	"Alice" (爱丽丝)	3:09
12.	"Nighthawks"	4:20
13.	"Uchiage Hanabi" (打上花火 "Fireworks", rearrangement)	4:19
14.	"Hai-iro to Ao" (灰色と青 "Gray and Blue", with Masaki Suda)	5:32
Total length:		60:08

== Charts ==
=== Weekly charts ===
Chart (2017)	Peak position
Japanese Albums (Oricon)	1
Japanese Hot Albums (Billboard Japan)	1

=== Year-end charts ===
Chart (2019)	Position
Japanese Albums (Oricon)	41

Preceded by The Kids (Suchmos)	Japan Record Award for the Best Album; 2018	Succeeded by 9999 (The Yellow Monkey)
