= Dune (song) =

Single by Hachi ft. Hatsune Miku

from the album Bootleg
- Language: Japanese
- Released: July 21, 2017
- Recorded: 2017
- Genre: J-pop; Vocaloid
- Length: 3:58
- Label: REISSUE RECORDS
- Songwriter: Kenshi Yonezu
- Producer: Kenshi Yonezu

Kenshi Yonezu/Hachi singles chronology
"Peace Sign" (2017)	"Dune" (2017)	"Lemon" (2018)

Music video
- "DUNE" on YouTube

"Dune" (砂の惑星, Suna no Wakusei; lit. 'Sand Planet') is a song composed by Japanese musician Kenshi Yonezu under his alias Hachi, featuring vocals by himself and Vocaloid virtual singer Hatsune Miku. The song was created for Hatsune Miku's 10th birthday and anniversary event Hatsune Miku 10th Anniversary Magical Mirai 2017, and was first performed at Yonezu's solo concert on July 14, 2017. Its music video, released on July 21, received over 1 million views in less than a week.

== Music ==
The song's tune and lyrics were done by Yonezu, with vocals done in Vocaloid, a kind of singing synthesizer software. The theme of the song is a desert planet where life is dying and "no grass will grow for the next millennium", which Yonezu said refers to the dreary, "desert-like atmosphere" of the Japanese video site Niconico at the time of the song compared to when he was first active. The song is relatively slow compared to many other Vocaloid songs, at only 95 BPM, in addition to the second half of the song sounding like post-trap hip-hop. Yonezu also likened the new generation of creators to "the wind that blows away the desert" in the song.

The song has abundant references to the Japanese Vocaloid community and past Vocaloid works.

== Release ==
Yonezu performed the song himself for the first time at his solo concert at the Tokyo International Forum from July 14 to 15. On July 21, 2017, a music video produced by Yonezu and Minakata Kenkyūjo, who had worked together many times before, was released on YouTube and Niconico. The music video features Hatsune Miku leading a group of masked, mysterious people through a desert landscape. Yonezu performed the song at Hatsune Miku's anniversary event, Hatsune Miku 10th Anniversary Magical Mirai 2017, which took place from September 1 to September 3. Another version of the song with Yonezu's lead vocals (with Hatsune Miku in the chorus) was included on the album Bootleg, which was released on 1 November.

== Reception ==
After its release on NicoNico, the song surpassed 1 million plays in 6 days and 5 hours, breaking the record in the Vocaloid category previously held by the song "FREELY TOMORROW" by Mitchie M. The controversy surrounding the imagery in the song led to the song reaching number one in Twitter mentions on the Billboard Japan chart in Japan for the week ending 23 July. On July 31, the song reached No. 8 on the Billboard Japan Hot 100.

Because this song alludes to the decline of the Vocaloid scene in Niconico, it sparked strong reactions from many Vocaloid producers, with some agreeing with his views, while others disagreeing. Since then, some Vocaloid songs have been considered responses to this song, including NayutalieN's "Reverse Universe" (リバースユニバース) and Syudou's "Jackpot Sad Girl" (ジャックポットサッドガール).
