= Balloom =

Japanese record label

- Type: Music publisher
- Industry: Japanese music
- Founded: March 4, 2011
- Headquarters: Japan
- Key people: Wowaka, Toku P, Fullkawa Honpo and Hachi

Balloom is an independent Japanese record label that was created in 2011. Until 2013, it focused on releasing music by musicians who were popular on video streaming service Niconico Douga, especially those who used Vocaloid software, and people who created Dōjin music.

== History ==
Balloom was created in March 2011 by Toku P, who asked seven other musicians who were popular on Niconico Douga in 2009 to join the label. Four founding members of the label, Wowaka, Toku, Fullkawa Honpo and Hachi (Kenshi Yonezu) formed a production collective called Estlabo to work on the ending theme song of the anime Anohana: The Flower We Saw That Day, a cover of Zone's "Secret Base (Kimi ga Kureta Mono)" sung by voice actresses Ai Kayano, Haruka Tomatsu and Saori Hayami.

The first release on the label was the album Unhappy Refrain by Wowaka on May 18, 2011, which reached number 6 on Oricon's albums charts. The label organised their first live concert for Honpo Fullkawa's at Shimokita Mosaic in Tokyo on October 22, 2011.

Vocaloid producer Hachi released his debut album Diorama on May 16, 2012, under his real name Kenshi Yonezu, which debuted at number 6 on Oricon. The album was one of the winners of the 5th CD Shop Awards, an award voted on by music store personnel. Yonezu left the label in April 2013, and became a major label artist under Universal Sigma.

On September 25, 2013, Balloom Best was released: a 2CD compilation album of all of the musicians who released music under the label. In November 2013, Wowaka's band Hitorie was signed to major label Sony.

== Artists ==
- Agoaniki (アゴアニキ)
- Fullkawa Honpo
- Oster Project
- Scop (すこっぷ)
- Nanou (ナノウ)
- Toku P
- Wowaka
- Kenshi Yonezu

== Released albums ==
- Wowaka - Unhappy Refrain (2011)
- Fullkawa Honpo - Alice in Wonderword (2011)
- Nanou - Waltz of Anomalies (2011)
- Oster "Big Band" Project - Gossip Cats (2011)
- Agoaniki - Agoagōgōgō (2011)
- Scop - Days (2012)
- Kenshi Yonezu - Diorama (2012)
- Nanou - Unsung (2012)
- Nanou - Andloids: All Time Best of Nanou (2013)
- Balloom Best (2013)
