= Lemon (Kenshi Yonezu song) =

Single by Kenshi Yonezu

from the album Stray Sheep
- Language: Japanese
- B-side: "Cranberry & Pancake" "Paper Flower"
- Released: March 14, 2018
- Recorded: 2017
- Genre: J-pop; indie rock; pop rock
- Length: 4:16
- Label: Sony Japan
- Songwriter: Kenshi Yonezu

Kenshi Yonezu singles chronology
"Dune" (2017)	"Lemon" (2018)	"Flamingo/Teenage Riot" (2018)

Music video
- "Lemon" on YouTube

"Lemon" is a song by Japanese singer-songwriter Kenshi Yonezu, released as a single through Sony Music Entertainment Japan on March 14, 2018. It is the theme song for the TV series Unnatural. It has sold more than 500,000 physical copies and 3,000,000 digital copies in Japan.

== Background ==
Kenshi accepted several interviews about "Lemon", talked about the background of "Lemon" and others. The temporary title was "Memento." He said, "I think it came from somewhere in my memory, but I can't really explain it well either." Even the day before recording, he was still writing the lyrics, the last two sentences "Like one half of a fruit sliced in two, even now, you are my light" suddenly appeared in his brain and he said, "Ahh, so this song really was "Lemon."" He also did the cover illustration himself. He focused on liveliness and freshness of a lemon, giving it an image quite unlike what's typically associated with death. For the song, he wanted to go for a ballad, but a simple ballad is not very interesting for him, and he did not want it to be purely gloomy. As a result, he made a hybrid of sorts, with sad words over a dancing, skipping rhythm. He made the song while on his nationwide tour, during which his grandfather died. He agonized over it a lot, so it took even longer to finish than usual.

== Music video ==
On February 27, 2018, the music video was published on YouTube.

On November 3, 2026, the music video reached one billion views on YouTube, becoming the first Japanese music video to do so.

== Live performances ==
On December 31, 2018, Yonezu gave his first performance on television, singing the track on 69th NHK Kōhaku Uta Gassen.

== Track listing ==
All tracks are written by Kenshi Yonezu.

No.	Title	Length
1.	"Lemon"	4:16
2.	"Cranberry & Pancake" (クランベリーとパンケーキ)	3:30
3.	"Paper Flower"	4:35
Total length:		12:21

== Personnel ==
Credits adapted from the liner notes.

- Kenshi Yonezu - production, arrangement, vocal, guitar
- Koichiro Muroya - string arrangement, strings
- Yu Suto - bass
- Masaki Huri - drums
- Ichiyo Izawa - piano
- Tatsuya Mochizuki - guitar technician
- Koji Imamura - drum technician
- Akira Miyake - vocal direction
- Masahito Komori - recording, mixing
- Ted Jensen - mastering

== Charts ==
=== Weekly charts ===
Chart (2018)	Peak position
Japan (Hot 100)	1
Japan (Oricon)	2
Japan (Oricon Combined)	1

Chart (2023–2025)	Peak position
South Korea (Circle)	108

=== Year-end charts ===
Chart (2018)	Position
Japan (Hot 100)	1
Japan (Oricon)	18
Taiwan (Hito Radio)	6

Chart (2019)	Position
Japan (Hot 100)	1
Japan (Oricon)	34
Japan (Oricon Combined)	10

Chart (2020)	Position
Japan Hot 100	17

Chart (2021)	Position
Japan Hot 100	47

Chart (2022)	Position
Japan Hot 100	73

Chart (2023)	Position
Japan Hot 100	73

Chart (2024)	Position
Japan Hot 100	63

Chart (2025)	Position
Japan Hot 100	65
South Korea (Circle)	169

=== All-time charts ===
Chart (2008–2022)	Position
Japan (Japan Hot 100)	1

== Certifications ==
Region	Certification	Certified units/sales
Japan (RIAJ) physical sales	2× Platinum	500,000^{^}
Japan (RIAJ) digital sales	3× Million	3,000,000^{*}
Streaming
Japan (RIAJ)	3× Platinum	300,000,000^{†}
^{*} Sales figures based on certification alone.^{^} Shipments figures based on certification alone.^{†} Streaming-only figures based on certification alone.

== Accolades ==
Year	Ceremony	Award	Result
2018	MTV Video Music Awards Japan	Best Video of the Year	Won
2018	MTV Video Music Awards Japan	Best Male Video	Won
2018	96th Television Drama Academy Awards	Best Theme Song	Won
2018	International Drama Festival in Tokyo	Theme Song Award	Won
2018	Billboard Japan Music Awards	Hot 100 of the Year	Won
2019	Billboard Japan Music Awards	Hot 100 of the Year	Won
2019	Space Shower Music Awards	Song of the Year	Won
2020	JASRAC Awards	Gold Award	Won
2025	Music Awards Japan	Top Japanese Song in Asia	Won
