= Kenshi Yonezu =

Japanese singer

Kenshi Yonezu 米津 玄師
- Also known as: Hachi
- Born: March 10, 1991 (age 35); Tokushima, Japan
- Genres: J-pop; rock
- Occupations: Singer; songwriter; illustrator; videographer; record producer
- Instruments: Vocals; guitar
- Works: Discography
- Years active: 2009–present
- Labels: Balloom; Universal Sigma; Sony Music; SME
- Website: reissuerecords.net

Kenshi Yonezu (米津 玄師, Yonezu Kenshi; born March 10, 1991) is a Japanese singer-songwriter, musician, producer, and illustrator. He started releasing Vocaloid music under the stage name Hachi (ハチ) in 2009. In 2012, he debuted under his real name, releasing music with his own voice. He has sold at least 4.2 million physical copies and over 7 million digital copies in Japan.

Yonezu's 2018 single "Lemon" became his biggest hit in Japan, topping the Billboard Japan Hot 100 year-end chart for two consecutive years (2018–2019). His 2022 song "Kick Back" is his most successful single to date outside Japan, debuting on international charts including UK Rock & Metal Singles and US Hot Rock & Alternative Songs, and was certified Platinum by the RIAA for 1,000,000 sold copies in the United States, becoming the first song with Japanese lyrics to achieve it. With his 2017 song "Peace Sign" certified Gold in 2026, he became the only artist to receive three RIAA certifications for Japanese-language songs.

== Life and career ==
=== Early life and career ===
Yonezu was born in Tokushima Prefecture, Japan, on March 10, 1991. He had difficulty communicating with others, especially his father. Yonezu felt that his mother understood him. He originally wanted to be a manga artist. When he was in fifth grade, he watched a Flash animation that was popular on the internet at the time, and was impressed by the music used by Japanese rock band Bump of Chicken. He was diagnosed with high-functioning autism at the age of 20.

His first foray into music was in 2006 during his second year of junior high school. Yonezu and Hiroshi Nakajima formed a band Late Rabbit Edda, while attending the school culture festival. Yonezu became the vocalist, songwriter, and occasional guitarist, while Nakajima became the guitarist. In late 2007, he made a website for the band, posting song lyrics and short novels. Yonezu wrote songs for the band, and uploaded 24 original songs to video sharing website Nico Nico Douga between April 2008 and March 2009. None of the songs were viewed, with the greatest, "Beelzebub", receiving only 23,000 views. Yonezu created his blog in this period, and called it Tekitō Edda (適当EDDA).

Yonezu moved to Osaka after high school and attended a fine arts school. He discovered Japanese musician Susumu Hirasawa on Nico Nico Douga and was strongly influenced by his work. After upgrading his computer, he began desktop music (DTM) and released about 30 original songs under the name Hachi, featuring his own vocals, on platforms like Nico Nico Douga. However, he later deleted all of them. The reason cited was that his own influences were too heavily reflected in the songs. Additionally, prior to his activities as Hachi, he was active under the name MinasoKo. Since 2009, he began uploading songs using the Vocaloid software Hatsune Miku alongside his band activities, gaining popularity. His 2009 song "Musunde Hiraite Rasetsu to Mukuro" (結ンデ開イテ羅刹ト骸) was his first song to receive over a million views on the site. Yonezu uploaded over thirty songs, but he deleted them when his Vocaloid songs became popular. He renamed his blog Denshi-chō Hachibangai (電子帖八番街; "Electronic Notebook 8th Avenue"), and it was one of five blogs awarded the Diamond Award at the 2009 WebMoney Awards.

In December 2009, Yonezu's song was included on Exit Tunes' compilation album Supernova, marking his first time appearing on a major album. In January 2010, his song "Musunde Hiraite Rasetsu to Mukuro" was included in the compilation album Vocalolegend feat. Hatsune Miku and reached the top 10 on the Oricon weekly albums chart. Yonezu released two self-produced albums in 2010: Hanataba to Suisō and Official Orange. Between 2010 and 2011, his songs were featured on many Exit Tunes albums, including Vocalonexus feat. Hatsune Miku, which was the second Vocaloid album to reach number one on Oricon's albums chart. On July 2, 2011, he traveled to the United States to participate as a Vocaloid creator in events related to Hatsune Miku's live concert 'MIKUNOPOLIS in Los Angeles' held at the Nokia Theatre in Los Angeles, California. The live performance was part of Anime Expo 2011. Some fans cosplayed as the character Parker from “Matryoshka”. On the following day, July 3, he participated in a signing event at the Expo merchandise booth alongside wowaka and Task from Minakata Research Institute as Hachi. He commented, “I'm happy to see it spreading overseas”.

In April 2010, Yonezu joined the animation collective Minakata Kenkyūjo (南方研究所; "Minakata Laboratory"), a group that he had worked with since his "Clock Lock Works" video in November 2009. Late Rabbit Edda remained active until 2010. They were renamed Ernst Eckman and added a drummer called Sumimoto to their lineup. As Ernst Eckman, they released a single song on MySpace, "Oborozuki to Sono Kōsatsu" (オボロヅキとその考察; "Crescent Moon and that Consideration"). Yonezu felt that he did not work well with other people, and decided to work alone on Vocaloid songs exclusively, giving up on being a part of a band.

=== Major label debut ===
In March 2011, Yonezu and seven other musicians created Balloom, an independent music label for Internet musicians to widen their musical opportunities. His first album, Diorama, was released on May 16, 2012. It debuted at number 6 and sold over 45,000 copies, becoming the biggest release on the label to date. The album was one of the winners of the 5th CD Shop Awards, an award voted on by music store personnel. Yonezu became a major label artist under Universal Sigma and debuted in May 2013 with the single "Santa Maria". He made the shift in order to work with musicians doing similar things as him. On October 28, 2013, Yonezu released his first Vocaloid song in two and a half years, "Donut Hole" (ドーナツホール, Dōnatsu Hōru), using a live band and the vocal Gumi. Yonezu released his second album, Yankee, on April 23, 2014, followed by the first concert in his career on June 27. His song, "Eine Kleine", was written for Tokyo Metro to be used in its the commercial campaign.

Yonezu produced his next two albums, Bremen and Bootleg. Driven by hit singles: "Uchiage Hanabi", "Loser/Number Nine", "Orion", and "Peace Sign", Bootleg won Album of the Year at the 60th Japan Record Awards. In November 2017, his 22-show "fogbound" tour began. On December 31, 2018, Yonezu made his live television debut on the 69th NHK Kōhaku Uta Gassen, an annual year-end extravaganza and one of Japan's most prestigious music programs. He performed his 2018 hit "Lemon" live from Tokushima, marking the first time a segment of the Kōhaku Uta Gassen was broadcast from Tokushima Prefecture. The songs "Uchiage Hanabi" and "Paprika", both produced by Yonezu, were also performed at the event. Yonezu wrote the lyrics for Masaki Suda's song, "Machigaisagashi". It won Best Pop Video at the 2019 MTV Video Music Awards Japan. When Billboard Japan published its year-end charts, "Uma to Shika" and "Machigaisagashi" ranked fifth and sixth respectively. In January 2019, Yonezu embarked on his first arena tour, 16-show "When the Spine Becomes Opal". The tour included his first overseas concerts in China and Taiwan. Yonezu won the Special Award at the 61st Japan Record Awards held on December 30, and "Paprika" won the Grand Prix. Yonezu co-wrote the song "Kite" for Japanese boy band Arashi, which served as the theme song for NHK's coverage of the 2020 Summer Olympics. In February 2020, Yonezu cancelled the 20-show "HYPE" tour due to the COVID-19 pandemic. On August 7, 2020, he performed during Fortnite's Party Royale, singing songs from his latest album Stray Sheep (2020), which had been released two days prior. In December, he became one of five recipients of the Special Achievement Award at the 62nd Japan Record Awards. Yonezu released "Daydream" as the theme song for NTV's "News Zero" in January 2021, and "Pale Blue" as the theme song for the TBS drama "Rikokatsu" in April.

In 2022, Yonezu released "Kick Back", which was used as the opening theme song for the anime series Chainsaw Man, and "M87", which was used as the ending theme for the tokusatsu movie Shin Ultraman. His 10-show arena tour "HENSHIN" began in September that year. In 2023, Yonezu released his single "Tsuki wo miteita - Moongazing" as the theme song for the video game Final Fantasy XVI, and released "Spinning Globe" as the theme song for Hayao Miyazaki's film The Boy and the Heron. Miyazaki had requested him after hearing children singing Yonezu's song "Paprika" at a Ghibli-run nursery school. When Miyazaki heard the completed song, he cried. Yonezu said the experience was the biggest honor in his life. His 2023 "Fantasy" tour, with 24 concerts, began in April.

His sixth studio album, Lost Corner, was released on August 21, 2024. It is his longest album, with 20 songs. On December 31, 2024, Yonezu did a special performance at the 75th NHK Kōhaku Uta Gassen, singing "Sayonara, Mata Itsuka!", which he wrote for the TV program The Tiger and Her Wings.

In January 2025, Yonezu embarked on his biggest tour yet, 26-show "Junk", with 350,000 people attending his domestic concerts, and 440,000 overall. "Junk" included his first world tour, with shows in Shanghai, Taipei, Seoul, Paris, London, Los Angeles, and New York City. Yonezu said he was "profoundly moved to have been so passionately welcomed by them". On March 5, 2025, Yonezu collaborated with two-time Olympic figure skating champion Yuzuru Hanyu, who performed a skating program for the music video of his song "Bow and Arrow", which was used as the opening theme for the anime Medalist. On 21st of April, NetEase Cloud Music named Yonezu as the most streamed Japanese artist in the platform's 12-year history with over 5.5 billion streams.

On September 15, 2025, he released his latest single "Iris Out" digitally, and "Jane Doe" featuring Hikaru Utada on September 22, 2025, served as the theme song and ending theme song, respectively, for the anime film Chainsaw Man – The Movie: Reze Arc. "Iris Out" became Japan's fastest song to reach 100,000,000 streams and peaked at number 5 on Billboard Global 200, the highest for any Japanese song. The song was first performed live at the 76th NHK Kohaku Uta Gassen.

On October 16, 2026, it was announced that his 2026 tour "GHOST" would be expanded into a world tour, including stops in Seoul, Singapore, Oakland, Los Angeles, Mexico City, Newark, Toronto, London, Paris and Amsterdam.

== Artistry ==
Yonezu writes and composes all of his music. In his Vocaloid songs and his independent album Diorama, he also arranged, programmed, mixed and performed all of the instruments by himself. When he moved to Universal, Yonezu began working with a band to perform his music. Yonezu considers Japanese bands Bump of Chicken, Asian Kung-Fu Generation and Radwimps big influences on his work, and Japanese authors Kenji Miyazawa and Yukio Mishima on his lyrics. As an illustrator, he feels inspired by Edward Gorey's illustrations. Yonezu generally composes songs on the guitar, but also occasionally uses drums to work out a melody.

Yonezu separates his musical career in two, including the one for Vocaloids credited as Hachi, and the other for his voice. He feels that music made as Hachi was created for the Nico Nico Douga community, while songs under his real name do not have such a strong tie. While he did not want to record covers of his Vocaloid songs during sessions for Diorama (2012), he felt the difference between Kenshi Yonezu songs and Hachi songs blur during sessions for Yankee (2014) and recorded a self-cover of "Donut Hole".

"Suna no Wakusei" (砂の惑星) (officially "DUNE" in English) is a song composed and arranged by Hachi after his long absence in VOCALOID music scene since his previous work, "Donut Hole". This is a theme song for Hatsune Miku Magical Mirai 2017 and featured on "Magical Mirai 2017 Official Album". It has entered the Hall of Legend on Niconico and rapidly surpassed 1 million views on YouTube shortly after its upload.

He has worked as a producer for other musicians several times. The first song he composed and arranged was Internet singer Lasah's "Nilgiri" (ニルギリ) in 2010. He composed and produced the song "Escape Game" (エスケープゲーム) for anime singer LiSA on her mini-album Letters to U (2011). He also worked on a remix for the ending theme song of the anime Anohana, "Secret Base (Kimi ga Kureta Mono) (Those Dizzy Days Ver.)", which was released in 2013.

Despite debuting his solo career in 2012, he did not hold any live performances for two years. His first concert was planned for June 27, 2014, two months after the release of Yankee.

Yonezu illustrated all of his early Nico Nico Douga videos, using a scanner or a pen tablet to draw imagery. When his parents bought a computer when he was 10, Yonezu made and uploaded flash animation videos for Bump of Chicken songs on the Internet. He continued to illustrate for his album Diorama, creating the music videos and the cover artwork by himself, and with the help of fellow members of Minakata Kenkyūjo. His Universal releases have also featured his own artwork. Yonezu primarily uses Adobe Photoshop Elements, Adobe After Effects and Corel Painter Essentials for animation. His illustrations became a feature in music magazine Rockin'On Japan starting in the August 2013 issue. His piece, called Kaijū Zukan (かいじゅうずかん; "Monster Picture Index"), features fictional creatures Yonezu has drawn.

To create songs, Yonezu uses music software Cakewalk Sonar. When he started to create Vocaloid music, he used Vocaloid 2 software, and Hatsune Miku vocals exclusively. However, Yonezu used Megurine Luka and Gumi in his songs in 2010. His album Hanataba to Suisō features Hatsune Miku only, whereas Official Orange features Hatsune Miku, Megurine Luka, Gumi, as well as his own vocals on the song "Yūen Shigai (遊園市街; "Amusement City Streets").

He answered on a radio program that Susumu Hirasawa's "MOTHER", which he listened to before he was 18 years old when he started his music career, was "one of the songs that changed my life", and said, "All of Susumu Hirasawa's songs have a musicality that I had never heard before, and I was very influenced by them."

== Discography ==
- Diorama (2012)
- Yankee (2014)
- Bremen (2015)
- Bootleg (2017)
- Stray Sheep (2020)
- Lost Corner (2024)

== Awards and nominations ==
| Year | Award | Category | Nominee/work | Result | Ref. |
|---|---|---|---|---|---|
| 2013 | 5th CD Shop Awards | Finalist Award | Diorama | Won | |
| 2015 | 7th CD Shop Awards | Finalist Award | Yankee | Won | |
| 2015 | 57th Japan Record Awards | Excellent Album Award | Bremen | Won | |
| 2016 | Space Shower Music Awards | Best Male Artist | | Nominated | |
| 2016 | 8th CD Shop Awards | Finalist Award | Bremen | Won | |
| 2017 | Space Shower Music Awards | Best Male Artist | | Nominated | |
| 2017 | 2nd Crunchyroll Anime Awards | Best Opening | "Peace Sign" (from My Hero Academia Season 2 anime) | Won | |
| 2018 | 60th Japan Record Awards | Special Award | | Won | |
| 2018 | 60th Japan Record Awards | Album of the Year | Bootleg | Won | |
| 2018 | Billboard Japan Music Award | Artist of the Year | | Won | |
| 2018 | 32nd Japan Gold Disc Award | Song of the Year by Download | "Uchiage Hanabi" (with Daoko) | Won | |
| 2018 | Space Shower Music Awards | Song of the Year | "Uchiage Hanabi" (with Daoko) | Won | |
| 2018 | Space Shower Music Awards | Best Male Artist | | Won | |
| 2018 | Space Shower Music Awards | Best Collaboration | "Haiiro to Ao" (with Masaki Suda) | Won | |
| 2018 | 10th CD Shop Awards | Grand Prize | Bootleg | Won | |
| 2018 | MTV VMAJ | Best Video of the Year | "Lemon" | Won | |
| 2018 | MTV VMAJ | Best Male Video | "Lemon" | Won | |
| 2018 | 96th Television Drama Academy Awards | Best Theme Song | "Lemon" | Won | |
| 2018 | International Drama Festival in Tokyo | Theme Song Award | "Lemon" | Won | |
| 2019 | Space Shower Music Awards | Song of the Year | "Lemon" | Won | |
| 2019 | Space Shower Music Awards | Best Male Artist | | Won | |
| 2019 | 102nd Television Drama Academy Awards | Best Theme Song | "Uma to Shika" | Won | |
| 2019 | 61st Japan Record Awards | Special Award | | Won | |
| 2020 | 34th Japan Gold Disc Award | Special Awards | | Won | |
| 2020 | Space Shower Music Awards | Best Male Artist | | Won | |
| 2020 | MTV VMAJ | Best Male Video | "Kanden" | Won | |
| 2020 | ACC TOKYO CREATIVITY AWARDS | Media Creative Section – Grand Prix | "Kanden" | Won | |
| 2020 | 62nd Japan Record Awards | Special Award | | Won | |
| 2020 | Billboard Japan Music Awards | Top Album of the Year | Stray Sheep | Won | |
