= Diorama (Kenshi Yonezu album) =

Studio album by Kenshi Yonezu
- Released: May 16, 2012
- Recorded: 2010–2012
- Genres: Alternative rock, Emo, Math Rock
- Length: 1:01:40
- Language: Japanese
- Label: Balloom
- Producer: Kenshi Yonezu

Kenshi Yonezu chronology
Official Orange (2010)	Diorama (2012)	Yankee (2014)

Singles from Diorama
- 1. "Go Go Yūreisen" Released: March 21, 2012; 2. "Vivi" Released: April 26, 2012

Diorama (stylized in all lowercase) is the first album by Japanese musician Kenshi Yonezu. It was released on May 16, 2012. It was the first studio album released under his real name, and the first to use his own voice as opposed to his Vocaloid albums released under the name Hachi. The album was one of the top independent releases in Japan in 2012, and was one of the winners of the 5th CD Shop Awards.

== Background and development ==
Yonezu first released music on the Internet using Vocaloid software, and uploaded videos to the video steaming website Nico Nico Douga from 2009 to 2011. Many of his songs were very popular on the site, including "Matryoshka" with 5,000,000 views and "Musunde Hiraite Rasetsu to Mukuro" with 3,000,000 views amassed by the release of Diorama. In 2010. Yonezu self-released two albums of Vocaloid songs, Hanataba to Suisō in February and Official Orange in November. Official Orange also featured a song where Yonezu used his own vocals, "Yūen Shigai (遊園市街; "Amusement City Streets").

In April 2010, Yonezu joined the dōjin animation collective Minakata Kenkyūjo (南方研究所; "Minakata Laboratory"), a group that he'd worked with since his "Clock Lock Works" video in November 2009. The group had worked on Yonezu's songs "Clock Lock Works," "World's End Umbrella," "Sajō no Yumekui Shōjo" (沙上の夢喰い少女; "Dream-eater Girl on the Sand") and "Wonderland to Hitsuji no Uta" (ワンダーランドと羊の歌; "Wonderland and the Sheep's Song").

In March 2011, Yonezu and seven other musicians created Balloom, an independent music label for Internet musicians to widen their musical opportunities. Since the first meetings Yonezu had with the company, he intended to release music using his own voice and not Vocaloid software.

== Writing and production ==
The album was sung, written, produced, arranged and mixed all by Yonezu himself. He began planning Diorama in 2010, and the album took a year and a half to complete. Yonezu did not collaborate with other musicians on the album, as he felt at the time that he was not a good communicator. The album is a concept album about an imaginary town that is built on top of a catfish. All of the songs are stories that happen in the town. The idea of having a miniature town was one of Yonezu's first when planning the album, and he created characters and stories for the people who lived in the town. Yonezu considers the lyrics of "Vivi" to be the closest to his own feelings. The song "Machi" was originally titled "Furu Asa" (降る朝; "Falling Morning"), and the lyrics were put in a blog post by Yonezu on March 16, 2011.

Yonezu drew all of the illustrations in the booklet himself, including the cover. He drew the catfish in the style they were drawn in Edo period Japan. He was also the illustrator for the videos for "Go Go Yūreisen" and "Vivi" that were uploaded to Nico Nico Douga and YouTube to promote the album. The art for the album was inspired by the art of Edward Gorey, and remained in black and white as he finds colouring tedious.

The album had three illustrated music videos released, "Go Go Yūreisen," "Vivi" and "Koi to Byōnetsu." However, Yonezu had originally planned to release four or five videos for songs on the album.

== Promotion and release ==
On February 19, 2012, the song "Go Go Yūreisen" was uploaded to Nico Nico Douga and YouTube, and became the number one viewed video for the day on Nico Nico Douga on February 21. The song was released as a single on iTunes on March 21. This was followed by a video for the song "Vivi," released on March 15. Both songs and their illustration videos were played on music video channels.

On March 28, Balloom began distributing free sampler CDs to stores such as Tower Records, HMV, Shinseido, Village Vanguard, Comic Toranoana, Animate and Wonder Goo. Free rental CDs were also released to Tsutaya on April 6. On April 5, an anime music video for "Koi to Byōnetsu" directed by Minakata Kenkyūjo was released. The video was featured on the album's DVD. On April 26, the song "Vivi" was released on Dwango for a limited 24-hour period, and reached number one on the store's charts that day. On the day of release, Yonezu went to Nico Nico Douga event building Nico Nico Honsha for a signing session. On June 13, Yonezu made an appearance on the Tokyo FM radio show School of Lock!

While live concerts were not performed at the time of release, in the concert for Yonezu's second album Yankee held on June 27, 2014 in Tokyo, Yonezu performed "Machi", "Dagashiya Shōbai", "Vivi", "Hikarabita Bus Hitotsu", and "Go Go Yūreisen".

== Chart performance ==
The album debuted at number 6 on Oricon's albums chart, selling 25,000 copies. In the same week, it reached number one on Billboard Japan's Top Independent Albums and Singles chart. It returned to number one for two weeks in June 2012.

After charting on Oricon's top 300 albums chart for 21 weeks, the album became the number 141 most sold album of 2012 in Japan with 48,000 copies. It was ranked the number 9 most sold independent album/single of 2012 according to Billboard. It is the most successful release on the Balloom label.

== Critical reception ==
The album was received favourably by music reviewers, with both CDJournal and Rockin' On's Kotaro Matsumura calling the album a masterpiece. Yosuke Ito of Skream! praised the album's rock taste, strongly forged melody lines and the "word-play"-like catchiness. The album was one of the winners of the 5th CD Shop Awards, an award voted on by music store personnel.

In October 2012, Dojin pianist Marasy covered "Go Go Yūreisen" on his debut album V-Box.

== Track listing ==
All tracks are written by Kenshi Yonezu.

No.	Title	Length
1.	"Machi" (街 "Town")	5:40
2.	"Go Go Yūreisen" (ゴーゴー幽霊船 "Go Go Ghost Ship")	3:49
3.	"Dagashiya Shōbai" (駄菓子屋商売 "The Cheap Sweets Trade")	4:34
4.	"Caribou"	4:15
5.	"Amefuri Fujin" (あめふり婦人 "Woman in the Rain")	2:59
6.	"Disco Balloon" (ディスコバルーン Disuko Barūn)	4:23
7.	"Vivi"	4:30
8.	"Toy Patriot" (トイパトリオット Toi Patoriotto)	4:13
9.	"Koi to Byōnetsu" (恋と病熱 "Love and Fever")	4:22
10.	"Black Sheep"	5:09
11.	"Hikarabita Bus Hitotsu" (乾涸びたバスひとつ "One Broken Down Bus")	5:08
12.	"Kubi Nashi Kankodori" (首なし閑古鳥 "Headless Cuckoo")	4:23
13.	"Shinzō Hōei" (心像放映 "Televised Heart")	4:04
14.	"Shōhon" (抄本 "Extract")	4:04
Total length:		1:01:40

DVD
No.	Title	Length
1.	"Koi to Byōnetsu"	4:25

== Chart rankings ==
=== Charts ===
Charts (2012)	Peak position
Japan Billboard weekly top independent albums and singles	1
Japan Oricon weekly albums	6
Japan Oricon monthly albums	10

=== Sales ===
Chart	Amount
Oricon physical sales	57,000

=== Year-end charts ===
Charts (2012)	Peak position
Japan Billboard top independent albums and singles	10
Japan Oricon yearly albums	141

== Personnel ==
Personnel details were sourced from Diorama's liner notes booklet.

- Ameo – music video "Koi to Byōnetsu" director
- Chobo Roku – music video "Koi to Byōnetsu" director
- Gaph – art direction, design
- Hiromichi "Tucky" Takiguchi – mastering
- Tasuku – music video "Koi to Byōnetsu" director
- Utsushita – music video "Koi to Byōnetsu" director
- Kenshi Yonezu – all instruments, arranger, composer, booklet illustrator, music video illustrator ("Go Go Yūreisen," "Vivi") lyricist, mixer, vocals

== Release history ==
Region	Date	Format	Distributing Label	Catalogue codes
Japan	May 16, 2012	CD+DVD	Balloom	DGLA-10016/B
Japan	June 2, 2012	Rental CD+DVD	Balloom	DGLA-10016/B
Worldwide	June 8, 2012	Digital download	Balloom	DGLA-10016/B
