= Paprika (Foorin song) =

Single by Foorin
- Language: Japanese
- Released: August 15, 2018 (Japanese); January 22, 2020 (English)
- Recorded: 2018
- Genre: J-pop
- Length: 3:28
- Label: Sony Japan
- Songwriter(s): Kenshi Yonezu
- Producer(s): Kenshi Yonezu

Music video
- "Paprika 1" on YouTube "Paprika 2" on YouTube; Yonezu version. (rearrangement) on YouTube "English version by Team E" on YouTube

"Paprika" (パプリカ) is a song by the children choral group Foorin. NHK invited Kenshi Yonezu to produce it as a cheer song for the 2020 Summer Olympics.

== Background and release ==
This song was performed at the 69th NHK Kōhaku Uta Gassen with Okaasan to Issho, Inai Inai Baa!, Seiko Matsuda, King & Prince, Sexy Zone, AKB48, Nogizaka46, and Keyakizaka46.

The CD of Japanese version was released on August 15, 2018. The MV of English version by Foorin Team E was released through YouTube on December 1, 2019, while CD was released on January 22, 2020. The MV of Kenshi version was released on August 9, 2019, and was available as a digital single on February 3, 2020.

The choreographers are Tomohiko Tsujimoto and Koharu Sugawara.

== Reception ==
The Japanese version debuted at No.18, peaked at No.3 in January 2020 and charted in the Oricon singles chart for more than 100 weeks. The song won the Grand Prix award at the 61st Japan Record Awards on December 30, 2019, becoming the first children's group to receive the award.

== Track listing ==
All tracks are written by Kenshi Yonezu, except where noted.

Japanese version – CD
No.	Title	Length
1.	"Paprika" (パプリカ)	3:28
2.	"Paprika" (instrumental)	3:16

Japanese version – DVD
No.	Title	Length
1.	"Paprika" (music video)
2.	"Paprika" (teaching video)
3.	"Paprika" (music video 2)

English version
No.	Title	Lyrics	Length
1.	"Paprika"	Nelson Babin-Coy	3:28
2.	"Paprika" (instrumental)		3:16

== Charts ==
=== Weekly charts ===
Chart (2020)	Peak position	
Chart (2020)	JP ver.	EN ver.
Japan (Oricon)	3	30
Japan (Japan Hot 100)	5	–

=== Year-end charts ===
JP ver

Chart (2019)	Peak position
Billboard Japan	7

== Accolades ==
Year	Award	Category	Result
2019	61st Japan Record Awards	Grand Prix	Won
2019	2019 MTV Video Music Awards Japan	MTV Breakthrough Song	Won

Preceded by "Synchronicity" (Nogizaka46)	Japan Record Award Grand Prix; 2019	Succeeded by "Homura" (LiSA)
