= Miryoku ga Sugoi yo =

Studio album by Gesu no Kiwami Otome
- Released: October 28, 2014
- Recorded: 2014
- Genre: Indie rock, jazz rock, math rock, "hip hop/progressive"
- Length: 38:34
- Language: Japanese
- Label: Unborde
- Producer: Gesu no Kiwami Otome

Gesu no Kiwami Otome chronology
Minna Normal (2014)	Miryoku ga Sugoi yo (2014)	Ryōseibai (2016)

Singles from Miryoku ga Sugoi yo
- 1. "Ryōkiteki na Kiss o Watashi ni Shite" Released: July 25, 2014; 2. "Asobi" Released: August 6, 2014; 3. "Digital Mogura" Released: October 13, 2014

Miryoku ga Sugoi yo (魅力がすごいよ; "Your Charm Points Are Amazing") is the debut studio album by Japanese band Gesu no Kiwami Otome, released on October 28, 2014.

== Background and development ==
In May 2012, Indigo la End vocalist Enon Kawatani formed a band of musicians who he respected for a separate project from Indigo la End. The group, Gesu no Kiwami Otome, debuted under independent record label Space Shower Records with the extended plays Dress no Nugikata and Odorenai nara, Gesu ni Natte Shimae yo. In April 2014, the band made their major label debut with the extended play Minna Normal.

In August, the band released their first single, "Ryōkiteki na Kiss o Watashi ni Shite" / "Asobi". "Ryōkiteki na Kiss o Watashi ni Shite" was a song commissioned for Arasā-chan Mushūsei, a drama adaptation of a comic strip written by Nayuka Mine. The second track "Asobi" was not originally a billed A-side for the single, however was promoted due to the song being chosen for cellphone company au's brand of Isai FL smartphones.

On September 3, Japanese boyband SMAP released their 21st album Mr. S, featuring two songs written by band vocalist Enon Kawatani: "Amanojaku" and "Suki yo". On September 20, Kawatani's other band Indigo la End released their first major label single, "Hitomi ni Utsuranai".

As with the band's previous works, artist Nobumi Fukui created the cover artwork for Miryoku ga Sugoi yo.

== Promotion and release ==
Gesu no Kiwami Otome's song "Digital Mogura" was chosen to be used for the mystery drama Subete ga F ni Naru, starring Emi Takei and Gō Ayano, which started airing on October 21. The song acted as the leading track from the album, and had a preceding release on iTunes on October 13, 2014.

A limited edition of the album was released, featuring a reproduction of the tote bag that the band took their name from, which had been created by an art school student friend of keyboardist Chan Mari's.

A day before the album's street date, Gesu no Kiwami Otome performed a free live concert in Tokyo on October 28. In November and December 2014, the band performed a national tour, Gesu na Miryoku? featuring 18 concerts at 14 locations in Japan. The tour final, held in Okinawa, also featured a performance by Indigo la End.

In March 2015, Gesu no Kiwami Gotome was awarded the best artist award at the 7th CD Shop Awards, due to their extended play Minna Normal and Miryoku ga Sugoi yo.

== Track listing ==
All tracks are written by Enon Kawatani.

No.	Title	Length
1.	"Lusca" (ラスカ Rasuka)	3:56
2.	"Digital Mogura" (デジタルモグラ, "Digital Mole")	3:34
3.	"Crying March"	3:18
4.	"Hoshi Furu Yoru ni Hanataba o" (星降る夜に花束を, "Bouquet on a Night of Falling Stars")	3:11
5.	"Ressha Classic-san" (列車クラシックさん, "Mr. Classic Steam Train")	2:11
6.	"Ryōkiteki na Kiss o Watashi ni Shite" (猟奇的なキスを私にして, "Give Me Peculiar Kisses")	3:53
7.	"Sally Mary" (サリーマリー Sarī Marī)	5:10
8.	"Ruins"	0:46
9.	"Asobi" (アソビ, "Play")	2:34
10.	"Hikari o Wasureta" (光を忘れた, "I Forgot the Light")	3:52
11.	"Bye-bye 999"	6:09
Total length:		38:34

== Charts and sales ==
Chart (2014)	Peak position
Japan Oricon daily albums	3
Japan Oricon weekly albums	4
Japan Oricon monthly albums	7
Japan Oricon yearly albums	93
Taiwan G-Music East Asian releases	20

=== Sales and certifications ===
Chart	Amount
Oricon physical sales	82,000
RIAJ physical certification	Gold (100,000+)

== Release history ==
Region	Date	Format	Distributing Label	Catalogue codes
Japan	October 28, 2014	digital download	Unborde	
Japan	October 29, 2014	CD	Unborde	WPCL-12018, WPCL-12024, WPCL-12025
Japan	November 15, 2014	Rental CD	Unborde	WPCL-12018, WPCL-12024, WPCL-12025
Taiwan	February 10, 2015	CD	Warner Music Taiwan	5419627942
