= Enon Kawatani =

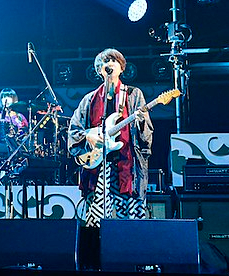
- Kawatani in 2015

Background information
- Born: 川谷健太; December 3, 1988 (age 37); Nagasaki Prefecture, Japan
- Origin: Japan
- Occupations: Singer; songwriter; guitarist
- Instruments: Vocals; guitar
- Years active: 2009–present
- Labels: Unborde, Taco, Daphnis

Kenta Kawatani (川谷 健太, Kawatani Kenta; born December 3, 1988), known by the stage name Enon Kawatani (川谷 絵音, Kawatani Enon), is a Japanese musician. He is the vocalist, guitarist and songwriter for the bands Gesu no Kiwami Otome, Indigo la End, Genie High, the instrumental band Ichikoro, and works as a songwriter for other musicians.

== Biography ==
Kawatani grew to like music when he was eight years old, when he heard T.M.Revolution's song "High Pressure" (1997). He began composing music while he was a university student at the Tokyo University of Agriculture and Technology. There, he met Masao Wada (currently known as Gesu no Kiwami Otome's bassist Kyūjitsu Kachō) at the light music club. In April 2009, Kawatani formed the band Indigo la End, mostly performing live performances in the Shinjuku, Shimokitazawa and Shibuya areas of Tokyo. Indigo la End released their debut EP, Sayōnara, Subarashii Sekai, in April 2012, through the independent label Space Shower Music.

In May 2012, Kawatani asked members of other bands who played at the Shimokitazawa Era live house to form a musical project together, as a fun activity outside of their regular projects, and called this band Gesu no Kiwami Otome. Kawatani continued to release music with Indigo la End, with their second extended play Nagisa nite in September 2012 and their first album Yoru ni Mahō o Kakerarete in February 2013. A month after their debut album, Gesu no Kiwami Otome also debuted through Space Shower Music, releasing the extended play Dress no Nugikata.

In December 2013, both of Kawatani's bands were signed to Warner sub-label Unborde. Both musical units released their major label debut releases on April 2, 2014: Minna Normal for Gesu no Kiwami Otome and Ano Machi Record for Indigo la End. In August 2014, Gesu no Kiwami's song "Ryōkiteki na Kiss o Watashi ni Shite" was used as the drama Around 30-chan: Mushūsei's opening theme song and released as a single. It reached number four on the Billboard Japan Hot 100 chart, and was certified gold by the Recording Industry Association of Japan. The band's debut album Miryoku ga Sugoi yo (2014) reached number four on Oricon's album charts, and their second, Ryōseibai (2016), reached number one, after several commercially successful singles released in 2015: "Watashi Igai Watashi ja Nai no", "Romance ga Ariamaru" and "Otonatic".

In 2014, Kawatani composed songs for musicians outside of his two bands for the first time, when he gave the boyband SMAP two songs for their album Mr. S. Kawatani worked with the band again in 2015, on their single "Ai ga Tomaru made wa", and has also worked with Tomohisa Yamashita, and the girl group Team Syachihoko on their single "Shampoo Hat" (2014).

== Personal life ==
Kawatani's real name is Kenta, though he has used the name Enon Kawatani since at least 2011. In Gesu no Kiwami Otome's early releases, Kawatani used the pseudonym MC.K.

In January 2016, Shūkan Bunshun magazine reported that Kawatani had gotten married in secret to a non-celebrity woman in mid-2015, and that Kawatani was suspected to be having an affair with television personality Becky. The article detailed leaked conversations between the pair from the messaging application Line. This led Becky to hold a press conference a day before the issue's release where she apologized for her conduct, and Kawatani to release an apology statement, in which he professed that he and Becky were merely close friends. In December 2015, Shin-Ei Animation had contacted Kawatani to ask him to write the theme song for the film Crayon Shin-chan: Fast Asleep! Dreaming World Big Assault! (2016), and for his band Gesu no Kiwami Otome to perform it. However, after the adultery allegations were published, Shin-Ei rescinded their offer.

== Discography ==
=== Production discography ===
List of songs that feature songwriting by Enon Kawatani outside of his work with Gesu no Kiwami Otome or Indigo la End.
Title	Year	Album	Notes
"Amanojaku" (アマノジャク; "Amanojaku") (SMAP)	2014	Mr. S	Lyrics and composition.
"Suki yo" (好きよ; "I Like You") (SMAP)	2014	Mr. S	Lyrics and composition. Charted at number 67 on the Billboard Japan Hot 100.
"Modorenai Kara" (戻れないから; "Because We Can't Go Back") (Tomohisa Yamashita)	2014	You	Lyrics and composition.
"Shampoo Hat" (シャンプーハット, Shampū Hatto) (Team Syachihoko)	2014	Non-album single	Lyrics and composition. Released as a single, reached number 4 on the Oricon single charts and number 22 on the Billboard Japan Hot 100.
"Ai ga Tomaru made wa" (愛が止まるまでは; "Until Love Stops") (SMAP)	2015	Non-album single	Lyrics and composition. Reached number 64 on the Billboard Japan Hot 100. As a double A-side single release with "Otherside", the song charted at number one on Oricon's single charts.
"Inochi no Hi" (命の火; "Fire of Life") (The Bed Room Tape featuring Enon Kawatani)	2015	Yarn	Lyrics and co-composition, in addition to guest vocals. Released as a vinyl single alongside the song "Onpu no Minato" on January 29, 2016.
"Minor na Kiss" (マイナーなキス) (Ai Otsuka)	2023	Marble	Lyrics, composition, arrangements, production.
"bordercoaster" (BACARDI RECORDS featuring f5ve, Enon Kawatani)	2025	Non-album single	Vocals, composition.
