= Heard That There's Good Pasta =

- Regular edition and digital cover (Note: On the limited edition, artwork cover is butterflies swarm pasta-shape flower with yellow background.)

Studio album by Aimyon
- Released: September 9, 2020
- Recorded: 2019–2020
- Genre: J-pop; pop rock
- Length: 48:15
- Language: Japanese
- Label: Unborde; Warner Music Japan
- Producer: Aimyon; Yūsuke Tanaka; Shingo Sekiguchi; Tomi Yo; Shigekazu Aida

Aimyon chronology
| Momentary Six Sense (2019) | Heard That There's Good Pasta (2020) | Falling into Your Eyes Record (2022) |

Singles from Aimyon
- 1. "Haru no Hi" Released: April 7, 2019; 2. "The Smell of a Midsummer Night" Released: July 24, 2019; 3. "Her Blue Sky" Released: October 2, 2019; 4. "On This Day We Say Goodbye" Released: February 14, 2020; 5. "Naked Heart" Released: June 17, 2020

Heard That There's Good Pasta (Japanese: おいしいパスタがあると聞いて, Hepburn: Oishii Pasuta ga Aru to Kiite) is the third studio album by Japanese singer-songwriter Aimyon. It was released on September 9, 2020, through Unborde and Warner Music Japan. It is the first studio album in one year and 7 months since Momentary Sixth Sense. Yūsuke Tanaka, Shingo Sekiguchi, Tomi Yo, Shigekazu Aida and others participated in the production and arrangement of the album.

The album includes 12 tracks — five singles "Haru no Hi", "The Smell of a Midsummer Night" and "Her Blue Sky" released in 2019, and "On This Day We Say Goodbye" and "Naked Heart" released in 2020, and 7 new tracks. The tracks feature authentic songs centered on playing narration to modern sounds created by the various producers. It reached number two on the Oricon Albums Chart and Billboard Japan Hot Albums and was sold 279,000 copies, and also received platinum certification from the Recording Industry Association of Japan.

== Background ==
On July 23, 2020, Aimyon's third studio album Heard That There's Good Pasta was announced to be released on September 9, 2020. It is the first studio album in about one year and 7 month since the second studio album Momentary Sixth Sense. The album contains previous 2019 and 2020 singles "Haru no Hi" (ハルノヒ), "The Smell of a Midsummer Night" (真夏の夜の匂いがする), "Her Blue Sky" (空の青さを知る人よ), "On This Day We Say Goodbye" (さよならの今日に) and "Naked Heart" (裸の心) and 7 new tracks, total 12 tracks. The cover artwork was in charged by Ran Tondabayashi.

For the album title, at first, Aimyon originally wanted to use a combination of kanji and katakana as a title like her previous studio album, 瞬間的シックスセンス (Momentary Six Sense) but at that moment, when she opened the notepad and said, "Heard that there's good pasta." (おいしいパスタがあると聞いて, Oishii pasuta ga aru to kiite) and she thought "This is it!" and decided to use as a title. About the album, Aimyon said, "The title will gradually become more meaningful later", and It would be nice if the album could be listened to with feelings, "I heard you can have a delicious meal here".

== Production ==
The songs of Heard That There's Good Pasta were selected from Aimyon's stock of more than 400 songs. Aimyon has been working on deciding the title and selecting songs since the national tour Aimyon On Tour 2019: Sixth Sense Story in December 2019 was started. Most of the songs on this album were written a few years ago, and "Naked Heart" in 2017. The most recent written song was "On This Day We Say Goodbye", which was written at the end of 2019. She said when she has chosen the songs to record, she selects from "listening to all the songs I've made so far, including new songs which have been made recently, and from among them, I think the songs are resonated and the best right now for me". Among them, she said "Unknowingly, the feelings at the moment (of the production) may be reflected in the lyrics". "Naked Heart" was originally planned to be a song recorded for the album, but Aimyon heard "a ballad hit song is not born in this era." and released as a single. When she asked Tomi Yo to arrange the song, he said the song was so good like he thought, "This is a ballad which should be made into a single". As a result, the drama Housekeeper Nagisa-san (家政夫のナギサさん, Kaseifu no Nagisa-san) was tie-up and was released as a single before the album.

== Music and lyrics ==
In Heard That There's Good Pasta, Yūsuke Tanaka, Shingo Sekiguchi, Tomi Yo, and Shigekazu Aida participated in the arrangement of all 12 songs. The first single in 2020 "On This Day We Say Goodbye" is an alternative message song featuring an electric guitar sound, and "Naked Heart" is a straight ballad-style love song. The opening track "Remember the Days We're Talking Rubbish in the Twilight" (黄昏にバカ話をしたあの日を思い出す時を) is based on marching rhythm reminiscent of a band, and the lyrics are about "unchangeable rebellious spirit". Aimyon described the opening track as "close to a manifestation of intention" and recalled it was good to be able to reconfirm she still had the rebellious spirit of his first album Excitement of Youth.

"Morning Sun" (朝陽) and "Potpourri Leaf" (ポプリの葉) are written based on Aimyon's own experience. In "Morning Sun", she said she intentionally made a slightly higher voice, and she had learned "how to make a voice matches the tone of the song" and "how to sing her own song". In "Chika" (チカ), Aimyon sang about a girl who isn't perfect and doesn't fit anywhere and assumed this girl to be a mermaid. "Marshmallow" (マシマロ), which is characterized by a thick guitar sound, is written about nipple, and was created to awaken herself when she was reading a sensual novel. "Living Like That" (そんな風に生きている), which concludes the end of the album, is a song which sang a "manifestation of intention" like the lead number and dotted Aimyon's own way of life.

== Release ==
Heard That There's Good Pasta released in two editions: limited edition and regular edition. The limited edition includes a 10-song hikigatari CD Kaze to Ribbon: Potato Studio, June 2020, including the unreleased song "Saraba" (サラバ), and has a sleeve case specification for both forms. As a first-come-first-served bonus good from each company, a mega jacket (regular edition pattern), A4-sized plastic file folder, original carabiner keychain, lunch tote reusable bag are also included, and a CD with a limited t-shirt was also sold.

== Critical reception ==
Miho Takahashi of Rockin'on' described Heard That There's Good Pasta as "Music of various ages is cherished to give respect, but sublimated in a way is unique to her in 2020", and she praised Aimyon for showing her spirituality, which is still in gekokujō, as "a terrifying unwavering and true popular musician".

Tomoyuki Mori of Real Sound said, "Her talent for accurately sketching the emotions of the moment she was born in herself and leading to pop music which everyone can resonate with, without being castrated, dressed up, or following trends, has been further refined and has a universal appeal".

Koji Dejima of Mikiki, a music review website pointed out and evaluated the album as "a mysterious nostalgic charm based on the taste of old rock and new music, and the continuous 90's J-pop".

== Commercial performance ==
Heard That There's Delicious Pasta was sold 120,169 copies in the first weeks after release and reached number two on the Oricon Weekly Albums Chart, and Billboard Japan Hot Albums with 122,708 copies in the first week, double of the previous studio album Excitement of Youth. In addition, the initial sales of a female solo artist's album have exceeded 100,000 copies since Hikaru Utada's Hatsukoi (208,000 copies) in June 2018.

On Billboard Japan year-end chart, Heard That There's Delicious Pasta reached number 8 on overall Hot Albums, number 7 on Download Albums, and number 10 on Top Albums Sales. The album also ranked number 15 on Oricon's year-end Albums Chart, selling 225,240 copies, number 5 on Digital Albums Chart, selling 27,643 copies and number 10 on Combined Albums Chart.

== Track listing ==
Credits are adapted from Tidal and Tower Records Japan.

All tracks are written by Aimyon.

Heard That There's Good Pasta – CD (limited/regular)
| No. | Title | Arrangement | Length |
|---|---|---|---|
| 1. | "Remember the Days We're Talking Rubbish in the Twilight" (黄昏にバカ話をしたあの日を思い出す時を (Note: Tasogare ni Bakabanashi o Shita Ano Hi o Omoidasu Toki o)) | Yūsuke Tatsuzaki; Takashi Kondō; Yūsuke Tanaka | 3:42 |
| 2. | "Haru no Hi" (ハルノヒ (Note: lit. "Spring Day")) | Tatsuzaki; Tanaka | 5:24 |
| 3. | "Cigarette" (シガレット (Note: Shigaretto)) | Shingo Sekiguchi | 3:29 |
| 4. | "On This Day We Say Goodbye" (さよならの今日に (Note: Sayonara no Kyō ni)) | Kondō; Tatsuzaki; Tanaka | 5:43 |
| 5. | "Morning Sun" (朝陽 (Note: Chōyō)) | Sekiguchi | 3:23 |
| 6. | "Naked Heart" (裸の心 (Note: Hadaka no Kokoro)) | Tomi Yo | 4:55 |
| 7. | "Marshmallow" (マシマロ (Note: Mashimero)) | Tomi Yo | 2:47 |
| 8. | "Her Blue Sky" (空の青さを知る人よ (Note: Sora no Aosa o Shiru Hito yo)) | Kondō; Tatsuzaki; Tanaka; Mio Okamura | 5:02 |
| 9. | "The Smell of a Midsummer Night" (真夏の夜の匂いがする (Note: Manatsu no Yoru no Nioi ga Suru)) | Tatsuzaki; Kondō; Tanaka | 3:55 |
| 10. | "Potpourri Leaf" (ポプリの葉 (Note: Popuri no Ha)) | Sekiguchi | 3:45 |
| 11. | "Chika" (チカ) | Kondō; Tanaka | 3:07 |
| 12. | "Living Like That"" (そんな風に生きている (Note: Sonna Fū ni Ikite Iru)) | Shigekazu Aida | 3:03 |
| Total length: | | | 48:15 |

Kaze to Ribbon: Potato Studio, June 2020 – Hikigatari CD (limited)
| No. | Title | Length |
|---|---|---|
| 1. | "Futari no Sekai" (ふたりの世界 (Note: lit. "The World of Two People")) | 5:00 |
| 2. | "Ai o Tsutaetaidatoka" (愛を伝えたいだとか (Note: lit. "I Want to Convey My Love")) | 4:07 |
| 3. | "Saraba" (サラバ) | 3:14 |
| 4. | "A World of Just Me and You" (二人だけの国 (Note: Futari Dake no Kuni)) | 5:52 |
| 5. | "Happy" (ハッピー (Note: Happi)) | 3:23 |
| 6. | "Aoi" (葵 (Note: lit. "Hollyhock")) | 4:08 |
| 7. | "Haru no Hi" (ハルノヒ) | 6:08 |
| 8. | "Naked Heart" (裸の心) | 5:09 |
| 9. | "Marigold" (マリーゴールド (Note: Marīgōrudo)) | 4:46 |
| 10. | "Seishun to Seishun to Seishun" (青春と青春と青春 (Note: lit. "Youth and Youth and Youth")) | 4:57 |
| Total length: | | 47:53 |

== Charts ==
=== Weekly charts ===
Weekly chart performance for Heard That There's Good Pasta
| Chart (2020) | Peak position |
|---|---|
| Japanese Albums (Oricon) | 2 |
| Japan Hot Albums (Billboard Japan) | 2 |

=== Year-end charts ===
Year-end chart performance for Heard That There's Good Pasta
| Chart (2020) | Peak position |
|---|---|
| Japanese Albums (Oricon) | 15 |
| Japan Hot Albums (Billboard Japan) | 8 |

== Certifications ==
Sales certifications for Heard That There's Good Pasta
| Region | Certification | Certified units/sales |
|---|---|---|
| Japan (RIAJ) | Platinum | 250,000^{^} |
^{^} Shipments figures based on certification alone.
