= Ryōkiteki na Kiss o Watashi ni Shite =

- Cover for the "Ryōkiteki na Kiss o Watashi ni Shite" / "Asobi" single

Single by Gesu no Kiwami Otome

from the album Miryoku ga Sugoi yo
- Released: July 25, 2014
- Recorded: 2014
- Genre: Indie rock, jazz fusion, rap rock, progressive rock
- Length: 3:57
- Label: Unborde
- Songwriter: Enon Kawatani
- Producer: Gesu no Kiwami Otome

Gesu no Kiwami Otome singles chronology
"Ryōkiteki na Kiss o Watashi ni Shite" (2014)	"Asobi" (2014)

"Ryōkiteki na Kiss o Watashi ni Shite" (猟奇的なキスを私にして, Ryōkiteki na Kisu o Watashi ni Shite; "Give Me Peculiar Kisses") is a song by Japanese band Gesu no Kiwami Otome. Commissioned to be used as the opening theme song for the drama Arasā-chan Mushūsei, it was released as one of the A-sides of the band's first single in July and August 2014.

== Background and development ==
Gesu no Kiwami Otome, after releasing two extended plays with independent label Space Shower Records, released their first major label release in April 2014: the extended play Minna Normal.

The single was announced in June 2014. In late July, after the single artwork had already been produced, the single was quickly adapted into a double A-side single, due to the song "Asobi" being picked for a commercial tie-up with au's brand of Isai FL smartphones.

As with the band's other releases, artist Nobumi Fukui created the cover artwork and the single's booklet. The artwork was revealed on July 20, and featured a girl kissing a mascot character created by Fukui dubbed "Gesu-kun".

== Writing and production ==
"Ryōkiteki na Kiss o Watashi ni Shite"
Critics noted the mixture of a poppy sound and painful lyrics in the song.

The band were asked to produce the song by the drama producers, after seeing the band's name and feeling that such a name fit perfectly with the drama. The song was written by band vocalist Enon Kawatani, with the drama Arasā-chan Mushūsei in mind. He was inspired to write the song after reading the original comic strip for Arasā-chan, writing about the rude ("gesu") aspects of women from the perspective of a woman. He began the song by thinking of the keyword "Ryōkiteki na" ("bizarre"), feeling it fit well with Arasā-chan. He was inspired to write a poppy song to fit with the atmosphere of the original manga, mixed with painful lyrics inspired by the pathos of lead actress Mitsu Dan.

== Promotion and release ==
The drama Arasā-chan Mushūsei began airing in Japan on July 25, 2014. As the drama's opening theme song, it was used in promotional aspects such as commercials for the drama. On the same day, the song was released digitally to stores such as iTunes, and as a ringtone.

The band made appearances at summer music festivals immediately after the release of the single, including at the Rock in Japan Festival, the Rising Sun Rock Festival, Monster Bash, Sky Jamboree, Space Shower Sweet Love Shower 2014 and Rush Ball. The band performed at Music Station for the first time on August 29, performing the song. In September, the band performed a two date series of concerts, Gesu na Party, held at Zepp Nagoya and Zepp Tokyo.

== Music video ==
The music video for the song was released on July 30, 2014, and was directed by Hidenobu Tanabe. It featured a multi-angle setup, with a story centering on the break-up of a friendship over gyoza. The mascot character Gesu-kun also makes an appearance in the video, swooping around Kawatani. Kawatani felt that the comical music video subverted the impression of the song in a good way.

== Reception ==
=== Critical reception ===
Compared to Gesu no Kiwami Otome's previous releases, critics focused more on the lyrics of "Ryōkiteki na Kiss o Watashi ni Shite", which CDJournal praised as combining together into a "mosaic of love" and the "sentimental, friendly melody". Nobuaki Onuki of What's In? felt the lyrics were of particular interest, and that they reflected the protagonists of Around Thirty well. Tomohiro Ogawa of Rockin' On noted the juxtaposition between Kawatani's "poppy" melody and danceable tune, and the "painful" lyrics. Ogawa felt the piano riff and looped beats created a feeling of never-ending despair and emptiness, while Onuki felt Kawatani's rap-style vocals "miraculously" matched with the melodious chorus, even though they were an unlikely mix.

=== Commercial reception ===
The physical single debuted at number nine on Oricon's singles charts after selling 13,000 copies, while rival sales tracking agency SoundScan Japan tracked 12,000 physical copies sold in the single's first week. Over the course of the eleven weeks that the physical single was in the top 200 releases, it managed to sell a total of 23,000 copies. The song performed well digitally, managing to sell over 100,000 digital downloads between its release and May 2015, when the Recording Industry Association of Japan certified the song gold digitally.

== Track listing ==
All tracks are written by Enon Kawatani.

"Ryōkiteki na Kiss o Watashi ni Shite" / "Asobi" single
No.	Title	Length
1.	"Ryōkiteki na Kiss o Watashi ni Shite"	3:57
2.	"Asobi" (アソビ, "Play")	2:38
3.	"Dakedo Boku wa" (だけど僕は, "But I")	3:05
Total length:		9:40

== Chart rankings ==
Chart (2014)	Peak position
Japan Billboard Adult Contemporary Airplay	3
Japan Billboard Japan Hot 100	4
Japan Oricon weekly singles: "Ryōkiteki na Kiss o Watashi ni Shite" / "Asobi"	8
Japan Oricon monthly singles: "Ryōkiteki na Kiss o Watashi ni Shite" / "Asobi"	35

=== Sales and certifications ===
Chart	Amount
Oricon physical sales	23,000
RIAJ download certification	Gold (100,000)

== Release history ==
Region	Date	Format	Distributing Label	Catalogue codes
Japan	July 25, 2014	Ringtone, paid download	Unborde	
Japan	August 6, 2014	CD	Unborde	WPCL-11928
Japan	August 23, 2014	Rental CD	Unborde	WPCL-11928
