= Asobi (song) =

2014 single by Gesu no Kiwami Otome

- Cover for the "Ryōkiteki na Kiss o Watashi ni Shite/Asobi" single

Single by Gesu no Kiwami Otome ゲスの極み乙女。

from the album Miryoku ga Sugoi yo
- Released: August 6, 2014
- Recorded: 2014
- Genre: Indie rock, jazz fusion, rap rock, progressive rock
- Length: 2:38
- Label: Unborde
- Songwriter: Enon Kawatani
- Producer: Gesu no Kiwami Otome

Gesu no Kiwami Otome ゲスの極み乙女。 singles chronology
"Ryōkiteki na Kiss o Watashi ni Shite" (2014)	"Asobi" (2014)	"Watashi Igai Watashi ja Nai no" (2015)

"Asobi" (アソビ; "Play") is a song by Japanese band Gesu no Kiwami Otome. It was released as a single on August 6, 2014, as one of the two A-sides of the band's debut physical single "Ryōkiteki na Kiss o Watashi ni Shite" / "Asobi".

== Background and development ==
Gesu no Kiwami Otome, after releasing two extended plays with independent label Space Shower Records, released their first major label release in April 2014: the extended play Minna Normal.

The band announced the single "Ryōkiteki na Kiss o Watashi ni Shite" in June 2014. In late July, after the single artwork had already been produced, the single was quickly adapted into a double A-side single, due to the song being picked for a commercial tie-up with au's brand of Isai FL smartphones.

== Promotion and release ==
Originally "Asobi" was the third track of the single, but was moved to become the second track and was billed in the title, due to the tie-up with au. The au commercials began airing from July 18, 2014.

On August 26, 2014, a music video was released for the song, directed by Yasuyuki Yamaguchi. It was shot entirely using the built-in 4K resolution video camera found on the Isai FL smart phones, and featured footage of the band performing the song.

== Critical reception ==
Nobuaki Onuki of What's In? felt the song's surprising ensemble was stimulating and "made you feel the moment". He also noted Gesu no Kiwami Otome's "beautiful song construction" that made itself felt in the song.

== Track listing ==
All tracks are written by Enon Kawatani.

"Ryōkiteki na Kiss o Watashi ni Shite/Asobi" single
No.	Title	Length
1.	"Ryōkiteki na Kiss o Watashi ni Shite" (猟奇的なキスを私にして, "Give Me Peculiar Kisses")	3:57
2.	"Asobi"	2:38
3.	"Dakedo Boku wa" (だけど僕は, "But I")	3:05
Total length:		9:40

== Chart rankings ==
Chart (2014)	Peak position
Japan Billboard Japan Hot 100	59
Japan Oricon weekly singles: "Ryōkiteki na Kiss o Watashi ni Shite/Asobi"	8

=== Sales ===
Chart	Amount
Oricon physical sales: "Ryōkiteki na Kiss o Watashi ni Shite/Asobi"	23,000

== Release history ==
Region	Date	Format	Distributing Label	Catalogue codes
Japan	August 6, 2014	CD, digital download	Unborde	WPCL-11928
Japan	August 23, 2014	Rental CD	Unborde	WPCL-11928
