= Haru no Hi =

- Regular and digital cover

Single by Aimyon

from the album Heard That There's Good Pasta
- Language: Japanese
- B-side: "Carp"
- Released: April 17, 2019
- Genre: Folk
- Length: 5:26
- Label: Unborde; Warner Japan
- Songwriter: Aimyon
- Producers: Yusuke Tatsuzaki; Yusuke Tanaka

Aimyon singles chronology
| "Let the Night" (2018) | "Haru no Hi" (2019) | "The Smell of a Midsummer Night" (2019) |

Music video
- "Haru no Hi" on YouTube

"Haru no Hi" (ハルノヒ; lit. "Spring Day") is a song recorded by Japanese singer Aimyon from her third studio album Heard That There's Good Pasta. It was released on April 17, 2019, through Unborde and Warner Music Japan, as her ninth single. The song was featured as a theme for the 2019 animation movie Crayon Shin-chan: Honeymoon Hurricane – The Lost Hiroshi.

"Haru no Hi" expresses the male perspective of Hiroshi Nohara, Shinosuke's father, which reflects love of Nohara family, beginning at Kita-Senju Station in Tokyo. The title "Haru no Hi" was delivered from Kasukabe (春日部市), a setting of Crayon Shin-chan. The accompanying music video, directed by Tomokazu Yamada at Izu Peninsula, was premiered on March 11.

== Track listing ==
All tracks are written by Aimyon.

CD single, digital download, streaming
| No. | Title | Arrangement | Length |
|---|---|---|---|
| 1. | "Haru no Hi" (ハルノヒ) | Yusuke Tatsuzaki; Yusuke Tanaka | 5:26 |
| 2. | "Carp" (鯉) | Shingo Sekiguchi | 3:49 |
| 3. | "Haru no Hi" (instrumental) | | 5:26 |
| Total length: | | | 14:41 |

== Personnel ==
- Aimyon – vocals, acoustic guitar
- Yoshiyuki Yatsuhashi – acoustic guitar, electric guitar
- Michihiko Nakanishi (Yasei Collective) – bass
- Ken'ichi Shirane – drums
- Yusuke Tatsuzaki – programming, other instruments
- Yusuke Tanaka – programming, other instruments

== Charts ==
=== Weekly charts ===
Chart performance for "Haru no Hi"
| Chart (2019) | Peak position |
|---|---|
| Japan (Japan Hot 100) | 2 |
| Japan Hot Animation (Billboard Japan) | 1 |
| Japan (Oricon) | 6 |

=== Monthly charts ===
Monthly chart performance for "Haru no Hi"
| Chart (2019) | Position |
|---|---|
| Japan (Oricon) | 21 |

=== Year-end charts ===
Year-end chart performance for "Haru no Hi"
| Chart (2019) | Position |
|---|---|
| Japan (Japan Hot 100) | 13 |
| Japan Hot Animation (Billboard Japan) | 1 |
| Tokyo (Tokio Hot 100) | 11 |
| Chart (2020) | Position |
| Japan (Japan Hot 100) | 26 |
| Japan Hot Animation (Billboard Japan) | 6 |
| Chart (2021) | Position |
| Japan (Japan Hot 100) | 94 |
| Japan Hot Animation (Billboard Japan) | 14 |

=== All-time charts ===
All-time chart performance for "Haru no Hi"
| Chart (2008–2022) | Position |
|---|---|
| Japan (Japan Hot 100) | 44 |

== Certifications ==
Certifications for "Haru no Hi"
| Region | Certification | Certified units/sales |
|---|---|---|
| Japan (RIAJ) | Platinum | 250,000^{*} |
Streaming
| Japan (RIAJ) | 3× Platinum | 300,000,000^{†} |
^{*} Sales figures based on certification alone.^{†} Streaming-only figures based on certification alone.
