= On a Cherry Blossom Night =

Single by Aimyon

from the album Falling into Your Eyes Record
- A-side: "Till I Know What Love Is (I'm Never Gonna Die)"
- B-side: "Mini-Skirt and Hi-Lite"
- Released: February 17, 2021
- Genre: J-pop
- Length: 4:30
- Label: Unborde; Warner Music Japan
- Songwriter: Aimyon
- Producer: Yūsuke Tanaka

Aimyon singles chronology
"Super Girl" (2020)	"On a Cherry Blossom Night" (2021)	"Till I Know What Love Is (I'm Never Gonna Die)" (2021)

Music video
- "On a Cherry Blossom Night" on YouTube

"On a Cherry Blossom Night" (桜が降る夜は, Sakura ga Furu Yoru wa; lit. "On a Cherry Blossom Falling Night") is a song by Japanese singer Aimyon from her fourth studio album Falling into Your Eyes Record (2022). It was released digitally on February 17, 2021, through Unborde and Warner Music Japan. It was featured as a theme song on AbemaTV's reality show Koi to Ōkami ni wa Damasarenai.

== Background and release ==
On February 3, 2021, Aimyon announced a new single, titled "On a Cherry Blossom Night", scheduled for release on February 17, 2021, to digital music and streaming platforms. It was chosen for AbemaTV's reality show Koi to Ōkami ni wa Damasarenai's theme song. Prior to the release, the full version was aired for the first time at Tokyo FM's School of Lock! on February 3. An accompanying music video of "On a Cherry Blossom Night", directed by Tomokazu Yamada, was uploaded on March 5, a month after the song release. The song was combined with "Till I Know What Love Is (I'm Never Gonna Die)" and released as a double A-side CD single on May 26.

== Track listing ==
Digital download, streaming – standalone

1. "On a Cherry Blossom Night" (桜が降る夜は) – 4:34

CD single, digital download, streaming – double A-side

1. "Till I Know What Love Is (I'm Never Gonna Die)" (愛を知るまでは) – 4:36
2. "On a Cherry Blossom Night" – 4:34
3. "Mini-Skirt and Hi-Lite" (ミニスカートとハイライト) – 2:48
4. "Till I Know What Love Is (I'm Never Gonna Die)" (instrumental) – 4:36
5. "On a Cherry Blossom Night" (instrumental) – 4:33

== Charts ==
=== Weekly charts ===
Chart performance for "On a Cherry Blossom Night"
Chart (2021)	Peak position
Japan (Japan Hot 100)	13
Japan (Oricon) with "Till I Know What Love Is (I'm Never Gonna Die)"	8

=== Monthly charts ===
Monthly chart performance for "On a Cherry Blossom Night"
Chart (2021)	Peak position
Japan (Oricon) with "Till I Know What Love Is (I'm Never Gonna Die)"	23

=== Year-end charts ===
Year-end chart performance for "On a Cherry Blossom Night"
Chart (2021)	Position
Japan (Japan Hot 100)	73

== Certifications ==
Certifications for "On a Cherry Blossom Night"
Region	Certification	Certified units/sales
Streaming
Japan (RIAJ)	2× Platinum	200,000,000^{†}
^{†} Streaming-only figures based on certification alone.

== Release history ==
Release dates and formats for "On a Cherry Blossom Night"
Region	Date	Format	Version	Label	Ref.
Various	February 17, 2021	Digital download; streaming	Standalone	Unborde; Warner Music Japan	
Various	May 26, 2021	Digital download; streaming	Double A-side	Unborde; Warner Music Japan	
Japan	May 26, 2021	CD	Double A-side	Unborde; Warner Music Japan	
