= Run (Tofubeats album) =

RUN

Studio album by tofubeats
- Released: October 3, 2018
- Genre: J-pop
- Length: 50:17
- Label: unBORDE

Tofubeats chronology
Fantasy Club (2017)	RUN (2018)	Reflection (2022)

Run, stylized as RUN, is the fifth studio album by Japanese producer tofubeats, and his fourth on a major label. It was released on October 3, 2018, through Warner Music Japan subsidiary unBORDE.

== Release ==
The album was released on October 3, 2018. The album was preceded by multiple singles, including "Immortal Love", which was used in the show Den'ei Shōjo - Video Girl Ai 2018, "RUN", and "River", which was used as the theme song for the movie Asako I & II. A remixes album, titled RUN REMIXES, was released on September 4, 2020.

== Track listing ==
Regular edition
No.	Title	Length
1.	"RUN"	1:54
2.	"skit"	0:47
3.	"Immortal Love" (ふめつのこころ)	3:17
4.	"Moonlight"	4:35
5.	"You Make Me Acid"	7:08
6.	"Return to Sender"	6:13
7.	"Bullet TRN"	6:19
8.	"Newtown"	3:53
9.	"Sometimes"	3:57
10.	"Dead Wax"	1:59
11.	"River"	4:33
12.	"Immortal Love Slowdown" (ふめつのこころ SLOWDOWN)	5:37
Total length:		50:17

== Charts ==
Chart (2018)	Peak position
Oricon	22
