= Odorenai nara, Gesu ni Natte Shimae yo =

EP by Gesu no Kiwami Otome
- Released: December 4, 2013
- Recorded: 2013
- Genre: hip hop/progressive
- Length: 29:30
- Language: Japanese
- Label: Gesukiwa Records
- Producer: Gesu no Kiwami Otome

Gesu no Kiwami Otome chronology
Dress no Nugikata (2013)	Odorenai nara, Gesu ni Natte Shimae yo (2013)	Minna Normal (2014)

Singles from Odorenai nara, Gesu ni Natte Shimae yo
- 1. "Killer Ball" Released: November 20, 2013; 2. "Mochi Girl" Released: December 25, 2013

Odorenai nara, Gesu ni Natte Shimae yo (踊れないなら、ゲスになってしまえよ, "If You Can't Dance, You'll Be Completely Rude") is the second extended play by Japanese band Gesu no Kiwami Otome, released on December 4, 2013.

== Background and development ==
Gesu no Kiwami Otome released their debut extended play Dress no Nugikata in March 2012 through independent label Space Shower Records. The band performed across Japan throughout 2013, releasing a demo EP at their performance at Shimokitazawa Era on April 20, Otome to Dance.EP, and another called Otome no Yūwaku.EP on September 8.

The extended play was first announced on September 9, 2013. In September, the band became regular DJs for the J-Wave radio show The Kings Place. On the day of the extended play's release, it was announced that the band was also signed to Warner sub-label Unborde. In January, it was also announced that vocalist Enon Kawatani's other band Indigo la End would also debut on Unborde on the same day.

== Writing and production ==
The songs recorded for the extended play were composed of staples of their live sets in 2013. The title of the song "Killer Ball" is portmanteau coined by Enon Kawatani, merging "mirror ball" with "killer". The song features a section of Frédéric Chopin's Fantaisie-Impromptu, which Kawatani inserted because he wanted to break up the constant dance beat of the song with something different.

The cover illustration for the extended play was created by Nobumi Fukui, who also created the artwork for the band's previous release Dress no Nugikata.

== Promotion and release ==
The song "Killer Ball" was released as a preceding download from the release on November 20. On the same day, a music video for the song was published to YouTube. The band were interviewed by many music publications to promote the release, including Bounce, B-Pass, Rockin' On Japan, Musica and Zipper. The music video for "Killer Ball" was also put into heavy rotation on Space Shower music television. Gesu no Kiwami Otome made their first television performance on December 9, 2013, performing "Killer Ball at the TBS program Sound Room. The song was also chosen to be used as the December ending theme song for Count Down TV. The song was popular enough to reach number 50 on the Billboard Japan Hot 100 chart.

The second promoted song from the extended play was "Mochi Girl", which had its music video first unveiled at an event at Tower Records Shinjuku on December 21. It was released to YouTube on December 25, and received enough airplay to reach number 78 on the Billboard Adult Contemporary Airplay Chart in January.

In 2014, the band promoted the release with their first solely billed tour, Gesu de Ikoka Vol. 1, performing in Tokyo, Nagoya and Osaka in January and February 2014. They performed a national double-billed tour with band Kūsō Iinkai in February and March 2014, performing at eight cities across Japan.

== Critical reception ==
What's In? reviewer Nobuaki Onuki felt that "Odorenai nara, Gesu ni Natte Shimae yo" was an "even more satisfying version of Dress no Nugikata", and noted fusion of styles and genres on the release. Fumiaki Amano of Skream! was extremely positive about the release, feeling that the release had a "high level of perfection" with many genres and musical ideas.

== Track listing ==
All tracks are written by Enon Kawatani

No.	Title	Length
1.	"Killer Ball" (キラーボール, Kirā Bōru)	4:53
2.	"Mochi Girl" (餅ガール, "Rice Cake Girl")	3:47
3.	"Gesu na Sankaku Kankei" (ゲスな三角関係, "Rude Love Triangle")	3:32
4.	"Thread Dance" (スレッドダンス Sureddo Dansu)	5:27
5.	"Ikoka Nadeshiko" (いこかなでしこ, "Pure and Pretty Ikoka")	1:21
6.	"Jajaumasan" ("Bitch")	1:57
7.	"Hatsumi" (ハツミ, "First Sight")	4:01
8.	"White Waltz" (ホワイトワルツ Howaito Warutsu)	4:29
Total length:		29:30

== Charts ==
Charts	Peak position
Japan Oricon weekly albums	28

=== Sales ===
Chart	Amount
Oricon physical sales	39,000

== Release history ==
Region	Date	Format	Distributing Label	Catalogue codes
Japan	December 4, 2013	CD, digital download	Gesukiwa Records	QYCL-10001
South Korea	December 16, 2013	Musica Roma	Digital download	
Japan	December 21, 2013	Rental CD	Gesukiwa Records	QYCL-10001
