= Positive (Tofubeats album) =

Studio album by tofubeats
- Released: September 16, 2015
- Genre: J-pop
- Length: 55:10
- Label: unBORDE

Tofubeats chronology
First Album (2014)	Positive (2015)	Fantasy Club (2017)

Positive is the third studio album by Japanese producer tofubeats, and his second on a major label. It was released on September 16, 2015, through Warner Music Japan subsidiary unBORDE.

== Release ==
The album was released on September 16, 2015. The album was preceded by a single, also called Positive, featuring Japanese idol Dream Ami. The album also contains features from musicians such as Tetsuya Komuro and Skylar Spence. A remixes album, titled Positive Remixes, was released on January 20, 2016.

== Track listing ==
Regular edition
No.	Title	Length
1.	"DANCE&DANCE (intro)"	3:07
2.	"POSITIVE" (featuring Dream Ami)	4:07
3.	"T.D.M." (featuring okadada)	3:47
4.	"Too Many Girls" (featuring KREVA)	5:19
5.	"STAKEHOLDER"	3:51
6.	"Throw your laptop on the fire" (featuring Tetsuya Komuro)	5:00
7.	"I know you (skit)"	3:11
8.	"Without U" (featuring Skylar Spence)	3:40
9.	"すてきなメゾン" (featuring Tina Tamashiro)	4:11
10.	"くりかえしのMUSIC" (featuring Shigeru Kishida)	5:01
11.	"閑話休題 (skit)"	1:37
12.	"別の人間" (featuring Yoshie Nakano)	4:07
13.	"I Believe In You"	8:12
Total length:		55:10

== Chart positions ==
Chart (2015)	Peak position
Oricon	16
