= Fantasy Club =

Studio album by tofubeats
- Released: May 24, 2017
- Genre: J-pop, electronic
- Length: 59:37
- Label: unBORDE

Tofubeats chronology
Positive (2015)	Fantasy Club (2017)	RUN (2018)

Professional ratings
Review scores
Source	Rating
Pitchfork	7.6/10

Fantasy Club is the fourth studio album by Japanese producer tofubeats, and his third on a major label. It was released on May 24, 2017 through Warner Music Japan subsidiary unBORDE.

== Background ==
The album was inspired by the artist learning about the concept of "post-truth", and how he connected to the idea.

== Release ==
The album was released on May 24, 2017. The album had multiple singles, including "Shopping Mall", "Lonely Nights", and "Baby". "Baby" is also not present on the international version. The album contains noticeably less features than his previous albums. A remixes album, titled Fantasy Club Remixes & Instrumentals, was released on July 27, 2018.

== Track listing ==
Regular edition
No.	Title	Length
1.	"Chant #1"	4:51
2.	"Shopping Mall (For Fantasy Club)"	3:19
3.	"Lonely Nights" (featuring Young Juju)	3:56
4.	"Callin"	2:45
5.	"Open Your Heart"	4:51
6.	"Fantasy Club"	5:20
7.	"Stop"	1:45
8.	"What You Got"	6:17
9.	"WYG (Reprise)"	2:44
10.	"This City"	7:03
11.	"Yuuki"	5:59
12.	"Baby"	4:54
13.	"Chant #2 (For Fantasy Club)"	5:48
Total length:		59:37

== Chart positions ==
Chart (2017)	Peak position
Oricon	19
