= First Album (Tofubeats album) =

Studio album by tofubeats
- Released: October 2, 2014
- Genre: J-pop, electropop
- Length: 74:46
- Label: unBORDE

Tofubeats chronology
Lost Decade (2013)	First Album (2014)	Positive (2015)

First Album is the second studio album by Japanese producer Tofubeats, and his first on a major label. It was released on October 2, 2014, through Warner Music Japan subsidiary unBORDE.

== Release ==
The album was released on October 2, 2014. The album was preceded by two major label EP's, "Don't Stop the Music" and "Disco no Kamisama", both featuring the songs of the same names. The album includes features from artists such as Chisato Moritaka and Takashi Fujii. A remixes album, titled "First Album Remixes", was released on January 28, 2015.

== Track listing ==
Regular edition
No.	Title	Features	Length
1.	"20140809"	featuring Lyrical School	1:34
2.	"#eyezonu"		3:18
3.	"poolside"	featuring PES of RIP SLYME	5:19
4.	"Come On Honey!"	featuring Hitomi Arai of Tokyo Girls Style and okadada	3:56
5.	"Disco no Kamisama" (ディスコの神様)	featuring Takashi Fujii	4:55
6.	"Oshietekensaku" (おしえて検索)	featuring Noko of Shinsei Kamattechan	4:15
7.	"CAND¥¥¥LAND"	featuring LIZ	3:29
8.	"Asagakurumade owarukotononai dance o" (朝が来るまで終わる事の無いダンスを)		5:57
9.	"Populuxe"		4:12
10.	"zero to eight"		4:30
11.	"framed moments"		4:40
12.	"content ID"		3:08
13.	"Her Favorite"	featuring okadada	3:17
14.	"Don't Stop The Music"	featuring Chisato Moritaka	5:01
15.	"way to yamate"		2:59
16.	"Koromogae" (衣替え)	featuring Bonnie Pink	5:01
17.	"Hitori" (ひとり)		4:25
18.	"20140803"		3:12
Total length:			74:46

== Chart positions ==
Chart (2014)	Peak position
Oricon	11
