= Minna Normal =

EP by Gesu no Kiwami Otome
- Released: April 2, 2014
- Recorded: 2014
- Genre: hip hop/progressive
- Length: 23:26
- Language: Japanese
- Label: Unborde
- Producer: Gesu no Kiwami Otome

Gesu no Kiwami Otome chronology
Odorenai nara, Gesu ni Natte Shimae yo (2013)	Minna Normal (2014)	Miryoku ga Sugoi yo (2014)

Singles from Minna Normal
- 1. "Parallel Spec" Released: March 19, 2014; 2. "Normal Atama" Released: May 2, 2014

Minna Normal (みんなノーマル, Minna Nōmaru, "Everyone Normal") is the third extended play by Japanese band Gesu no Kiwami Otome, released on April 2, 2014. This was their first major label release through Unborde.

== Background and development ==
Gesu no Kiwami Otome was first formed in May 2012 by Indigo la End vocalist and songwriter Enon Kawatani, out of members of other musical units that Kawatani respected. The band released two extended plays in 2013: Dress no Nugikata and Odorenai nara, Gesu ni Natte Shimae yo. On December 4, it was announced that the band was also signed to Warner sub-label Unborde. In January, it was also announced that Enon Kawatani's other band Indigo la End would also debut on Unborde on the same day.

== Writing and production ==
When producing the song "Normal Atama", vocalist and songwriter Enon Kawatani first chose the album name, and created a song centred on the lyric "Minna Normal". Kawatani was inspired to write the song about people who consider themselves normal actually being the most abnormal people. Artist Nobumi Fukui, who had worked with Gesu no Kiwami Otome on their cover illustrations, created the entire Minna Normal booklet and cover artwork.

== Promotion and release ==
"Parallel Spec" was released as a preceding promotional single on March 19, 2014. It was made available for purchase as a digital download and a music video was released for the song. Indigo la End's song "Dubbing Scene" was simultaneously released with "Parallel Spec".

The band was the topic of the March 28, 2014 episode of the music program Bokura no Ongaku, where they were interviewed by Japanese comedian Chihara Junior. The band performed "Parallel Spec", "Killer Ball" from Odorenai nara, Gesu ni Natte Shimae yo (2013) and collaborated with singer-songwriter Shikao Suga to perform a cover of his song "Nobody Knows". The band made an appearance on the Fuji TV morning program Mezamashi TV on April 2, and music video channel Space Shower broadcast a special 15 minute program about the band, Gesu no Kiwami Otome Tokuban on April 15. The band made radio appearances at FM-Fuji's Chinmoku no Kin'yōbi, J-Wave's Tokio Hot 100, FM Nack 5's The Nutty Radio Show Onitama and Tokyo FM's School of Lock! in March and April. Interviews with the band were featured in March and April issues of music and fashion magazines such as Musica, Switch, Bounce, Rockin' On Japan, Seventeen, Marquee, What's In? and Barfout!.

On May 2, the music video for the second promotional track from the extended play was released, "Normal Atama". The Takuro Okubo-directed video was the first video of the band's to feature a dance routine. From May 21, "Parallel Spec" was used in commercials promoting the curation magazine Antenna.

== Reception ==
=== Critical reception ===
Critical reception to Minna Normal was positive. Sayako Oku of Skream! noted the "exploding pop sense" on the release, that was outstanding in the Japanese rock scene, and felt the songs' arrangements were "skillfully manipulated". CDJournal felt the release built on their already "mysterious" sound, and praised the attention-grabbing aspects that had "started to strike pressure points strongly". CDJournal praised Chan Mari's keyboard skills in particular.

Miki Ueno of Rockin' On noted the comical rhythms and lyrical sense of freedom on the release, feeling that the lyrics mixed irony, colloquialisms and an "intellectual musical sense" well. She noted the "beautiful melody" of "Parallel Spec" which was laid upon a "Gesu-style" dance arrangement, while Nobuaki Onuki of What's In? praised "Parallel Spec" for its "complex-like but relatable peculiar world view" and addictive nature. Onuki praised Kawatani's vocals in "Sakana no Kokoro" as "heart-piercing", and recommended "Shimin Yarō" for its "amazing ensemble" work.

In March 2015, Gesu no Kiwami Gotome was awarded the best artist award at the 7th CD Shop Awards, due to Minna Normal and their debut album Miryoku ga Sugoi yo.

=== Commercial reception ===
The extended play debut at number eleven on Oricon's albums charts after selling 11,000 copies, though rival sales tracking agency SoundScan Japan tracked 12,000 physical copies sold in the same period. Though it dropped quickly from the top twenty, the extended play had an extended chart life on Oricon's charts, spending eight weeks in the top 100 releases, and a further thirty weeks in the top 300 between its release date and July 2015, selling a total of 37,000 copies in this period.

== Track listing ==
All tracks are written by Enon Kawatani.

No.	Title	Length
1.	"Parallel Spec" (パラレルスペック Parareru Supekku)	4:37
2.	"Sakana no Kokoro" (サカナの心, "Fish Heart")	3:28
3.	"Shimin Yarō" (市民野郎, "Citizen Guy")	3:28
4.	"Normal Atama" (ノーマルアタマ, "Normal Head")	4:01
5.	"Song3"	3:09
6.	"Yureru Kareru" (ユレルカレル, "Sway and Wither")	4:40
Total length:		23:26

== Charts ==
Charts	Peak position
Japan Oricon weekly albums	11
Japan Oricon monthly albums	34

=== Sales ===
Chart	Amount
Oricon physical sales	37,000

== Release history ==
Region	Date	Format	Distributing Label	Catalogue codes
Japan	April 2, 2014	CD, digital download	Unborde	WPCL-11747
Japan	April 19, 2014	Rental CD	Unborde	WPCL-11747
