= Reflection (Tofubeats album) =

Studio album by tofubeats
- Released: May 18, 2022
- Genre: J-pop, Japanese hip-hop
- Length: 63:57
- Label: unBORDE

Tofubeats chronology
| RUN (2018) | Reflection (2022) |

Reflection is the sixth studio album by Japanese producer tofubeats, released on May 18, 2022, through Warner Music Japan subsidiary unBORDE. The album is his fifth on a major label. It peaked at 14 on the Japanese Oricon charts.

== Release ==
The album was released on May 18, 2022, in Japan. The album has several features, including rap group Neibiss, and singer Kaho Nakamura. The album was released with an accompanying book that details the artist's struggles with temporary hearing loss. A remix album, titled REFLECTION REMIXES, was released on November 3, 2022, and features remixes from artists such as Towa Tei.

== Track listing ==
Regular edition
| No. | Title | Length |
|---|---|---|
| 1. | "Mirror" | 4:11 |
| 2. | "PEAK TIME" | 4:22 |
| 3. | "Let Me Be" | 2:35 |
| 4. | "Emotional Bias" | 2:34 |
| 5. | "SMILE" | 2:34 |
| 6. | "don't like u" (featuring Neibiss) | 3:15 |
| 7. | "恋とミサイル" (featuring UG Noodle) | 3:38 |
| 8. | "Afterimage" | 2:45 |
| 9. | "Solitaire" | 3:16 |
| 10. | "VIBRATION" (featuring Kotetsu Shoichiro) | 4:01 |
| 11. | "Not for you" | 1:44 |
| 12. | "CITY2CITY" | 4:37 |
| 13. | "SOMEBODY TORE MY P" | 6:06 |
| 14. | "Okay!" | 8:02 |
| 15. | "REFLECTION" (featuring Kaho Nakamura) | 4:57 |
| 16. | "Mirai" | 5:13 |
| Total length: | | 63:57 |

== Chart positions ==
| Chart (2022) | Peak position |
|---|---|
| Billboard Japan Hot Albums | 13 |
| Oricon Albums Chart | 14 |
