= Till I Know What Love Is (I'm Never Gonna Die) =

- Double A-side single cover

Single by Aimyon

from the album Falling into Your Eyes Record
- A-side: "On a Cherry Blossom Night"
- B-side: "Mini-Skirt and Hi-Lite"
- Released: May 26, 2021
- Genre: J-pop
- Length: 4:36
- Label: Unborde; Warner Music Japan
- Songwriter: Aimyon
- Producers: Yūsuke Tanaka; Kazuma Nagasawa

Aimyon singles chronology
"On a Cherry Blossom Night" (2021)	"Till I Know What Love Is (I'm Never Gonna Die)" (2021)	"Heart" (2021)

Music video
- "Till I Know What Love Is (I'm Never Gonna Die)" on YouTube

"Till I Know What Love Is (I'm Never Gonna Die)" (愛を知るまでは, Ai o Shiru Made wa; lit. "Until I Know What Love Is") is a song by Japanese singer Aimyon from her fourth studio album Falling into Your Eyes Record (2022). It was released as her eleventh single, alongside "On a Cherry Blossom Night" on May 26, 2021, through Unborde and Warner Music Japan. It featured as a theme song of the Nippon TV's Saturday drama, Life's Punchline.

== Background and release ==
On March 31, 2021, it was revealed that Aimyon's new song, titled "Till I Know What Love Is (I'm Never Gonna Die)" would be featured on Nippon TV's Saturday drama, Life's Punchline as a theme song and scheduled for release as a double A-side single with "On a Cherry Blossom Night" on May 26, a year after "Naked Heart". The accompanying music video, directed by Kodai Kobayashi, was released on YouTube on May 7, alongside digital release.

== Track listing ==
CD single, digital download, streaming

1. "Till I Know What Love Is (I'm Never Gonna Die)" (愛を知るまでは) – 4:36
2. "On a Cherry Blossom Night" (桜が降る夜は) – 4:34
3. "Mini-Skirt and Hi-Lite" (ミニスカートとハイライト) – 2:48
4. "Till I Know What Love Is (I'm Never Gonna Die)" (instrumental) – 4:36
5. "On a Cherry Blossom Night" (instrumental) – 4:33

== Charts ==
=== Weekly charts ===
Chart performance for "Till I Know What Love Is (I'm Never Gonna Die)"
Chart (2021)	Peak position
Global Excl. U.S (Billboard)	197
Japan (Japan Hot 100)	11
Japan (Oricon) with "On a Cherry Blossom Night"	8

=== Monthly charts ===
Monthly chart performance for "Till I Know What Love Is (I'm Never Gonna Die)"
Chart (2021)	Peak position
Japan (Oricon) with "On a Cherry Blossom Night"	23

=== Year-end charts ===
Year-end chart performance for "Till I Know What Love Is (I'm Never Gonna Die)"
Chart (2021)	Position
Japan (Japan Hot 100)	96

== Certifications ==
Certifications for "Till I Know What Love Is (I'm Never Gonna Die)"
Region	Certification	Certified units/sales
Streaming
Japan (RIAJ)	Platinum	100,000,000^{†}
^{†} Streaming-only figures based on certification alone.

== Release history ==
Release dates and formats for "Till I Know What Love Is (I'm Never Gonna Die)"
Region	Date	Format	Version	Label	Ref.
Various	May 7, 2021	Digital download; streaming	Pre-release	Unborde; Warner Music Japan	
Various	May 26, 2021	Digital download; streaming	Standard	Unborde; Warner Music Japan	
Japan	May 26, 2021	CD	Standard	Unborde; Warner Music Japan	
