= Aimyon =

Japanese singer-songwriter (born 1995)

- あいみょん
- Born: March 6, 1995 (age 31); Nishinomiya, Hyogo, Japan
- Occupations: Singer; songwriter
- Musical career
- Genres: J-pop; rock
- Instruments: Vocals; guitar
- Years active: 2014–present
- Labels: Lastrum; Warner Japan; Unborde
- Website: aimyong.net

Aimyon (あいみょん; born on March 6, 1995) is a Japanese singer and songwriter. Her agency is ENS Entertainment, and her label is Unborde under Warner Music Japan.

== Career ==
Aimyon was influenced to become a singer-songwriter, because her grandmother aspired to be a singer or actress, and her father is an audio engineer. She grew up with music and started writing songs when she was in middle school.

She began writing lyrics on her second year of middle school, and around the same time, her father gave her an electric guitar. However, it was not the acoustic guitar she wanted, so she quit after playing for less than a month. When she was in her third year of middle school, an English teacher who was an ALT (Assistant Language Teacher) left her an acoustic guitar when they left Japan. At first, she looked at an instruction book by herself and began to teach herself how to play the guitar, covering songs by Yutaka Ozaki and Spitz.

Aimyon began penning songs in her first year of high school. While she was in school, she appeared on a music program that a friend uploaded on YouTube and performed the song in public for the first time. She also made it to the final rounds of an audition that her friends had sent her application to without her knowledge.

After graduating from high school, a YouTube video of one of her performances caught the attention of her first music label, Lastrum Music Entertainment. Therefore, she has not been active on the street or at live houses.

In 2014, Aimyon was introduced by the president of her agency to Ryoma Suzuki, a representative of Unborde. However, as she wanted to "grow into an artist who will be loved for a long time rather than making a debut in a hurry", it was decided that her first release would be under an indie label as test marketing. Training including performances started. Additionally, producer Junichi Hoshino told her to make 50 songs before officially joining the agency, and she started writing songs. By the time of her debut, she had about 130 demo songs.

On February 4, 2015, she debuted as a lyricist with "Time Goes By" on Johnny's West's third single "Zundoko Paradise". She made her indie debut on March 4 with the single "Anata Kaibō Jun'aika ~Shine~" (貴方解剖純愛歌 〜死ね〜), only available at Tower Records. Its extreme lyrics became a hot topic, and although TV and radio stations refrained from broadcasting, it ranked 10 on the Oricon Indies Weekly Chart. On May 20, she released her first indie mini-album tamago, which was her first nationwide distribution release; she released her second mini-album Nikumarekko Yo ni Habakaru later in December.

On February 16, 2016, Aimyon was selected by Space Shower TV as one of ten new artists expected to break out in the new future and performed at Space Shower New Force. On April 10, she had her first live performance in front of 8,000 people at the event "Coca-Cola presents unBORDE 5th Anniversary Fes 2016" commemorating the fifth anniversary of Unborde. On November 30, she released her major label debut single "Ikite Itanda yona" under Unborde. The staff at Unborde unanimously chose this song as her debut single with the theme of a high school girl's suicide. (Note: This is a strategy that takes advantage of not receiving much coverage on TV or radio when the theme of a release is suicide. As a result, a year after the release, Aimyon performed it on an NHK TV program calling it "a song that could not be played on the radio when it was first released".) The title song was used as the theme song for the drama Kichijōji dake ga Sumitai Machi Desuka?. Additionally, fans called November 30 "Aimyon Day" and "Iisao Day (Guitar Day)". Aimyon likes November 30 as a fateful day.

On February 4, 2017, Aimyon released her theme song Renai Kitan Shu, used for the film Bleach. On August 2, she released her third single "Kimi wa Rock wo Kikanai", which won power play/heavy rotation in August on 42 AM/FM radio stations nationwide, setting a record after achieving it after 4 years and 3 months. On September 13, she released her first full-length album Seishun no Excitement which recorded long sales for more than two years on Oricon charts.

In April 2018, she participated in the temporary group Radio Bestsellers singing the campaign song "Bookmark" for the FM802 spring campaign "FM802 X Tsutaya Access!". (Note: Radio Bestsellers consisted of Aimyon, Sekaikan Ozaki (Creep Hype), Kenta Kataoka (sumika), GEN (04 Limited Sazabys), Kousuke Saito (Unison Square Garden), and Shikao Suga.) On June 22, Aimyon held her first overseas performance with "Aimyon Tour 2018: Telephone Lobster – Additional Show 'Taiwan'" in Taipei, performing "Ikite Itanda yona" due to the popularity of Kichijōji dake ga Sumitai Machi Desuka?. Around one thousand people attended the concert. On August 8, she released her fifth single "Marigold", which recorded 1st on the streaming chart for 20 consecutive weeks. She was in charge of writing and composing the song "Karada no shin kara made moete irunda", one of the double theme songs of the drama Onryou o Agero Tako! Nani Utatteten noga Zenzen Wakaneendayo!! released on October 12. On December 31, she made her first appearance on the 69th edition of NHK's Kōhaku Uta Gassen, performed her song "Marigold". Chief producer Yoshihito Shibuya said that Aimyon was chosen because "[Marigold] is popular in distribution. It's popular with people in their 10s and 20s who are said to be 'digital natives', and this year's activity is remarkable."

On January 25, 2019, Aimyon released the theme song "Ra, no Hanashi" for the feature animation Ashita Sekai ga Owaru to Shitemo (Even if the World Ends Tomorrow). On April 17, she released her seventh single "Harunohi" which was used as the theme song for Crayon Shin-chan: Honeymoon Hurricane ~The Lost Hiroshi~. She wrote and composed "Dare ni Datte Wake ga Aru" (Everybody Has a Reason) and "Tachimachi Arashi" for the film Sayonara Kuchibiru (Goodbye Lip), which was released on May 31. The song was sung by the guitar duo Harureo, consisting of Nana Komatsu and Mugi Kadowaki, from the movie. From October, she held a hall and arena tour "Aimyon Tour 2019: Sixth Sense Story".

On July 24, 2020, she was in charge of the special program "Aimyon's All Night Nippon" on Nippon Broadcasting System.

On November 15, 2022, it was announced that she would be in charge of the theme song for serial TV novel Ranman in the first half of 2023. It was the first time a solo artist had been in charge of the theme song for a serial TV novel, and it had been seven and a half years since a singer who was born after the start of the Heisei era. (Note: In 2015, AKB48 (with lead vocal Aya Yamamoto) was in charge of the theme song for "365日の紙飛行機" (Airplane of the 365th day). Asuka Hayashi was in charge of the opening/middle songs, not the theme song, for "Imotako Nankin" in 2006.)

On December 8, 2024, it was announded that she would be in charge of the theme song for Doraemon: Nobita's Art World Tales, it marked the first time in 10 years since "Nobita's Space Heroes" (2015) that a female solo artist has been in charge of the theme song. She is the third artist to perform the theme songs for both the Crayon Shin-chan and Doraemon films series, following mihimaru GT and Yuzu, but it is the first time that she has first performed the theme song for Crayon Shin-chan and then the Doraemon theme song.

Aimyon will be in charge of "Ichi ni tsuite", the theme song for the July 2025 drama The 19th Medical Chart, starring Arashi's Jun Matsumoto.

== Artistry ==
Her musical influences include Spitz, Shōgo Hamada, Takuro Yoshida, Eigo Kawashima, Yutaka Ozaki, Flipper's Guitar, Kenji Ozawa, and Ken Hirai among others. She looks up to male singer-songwriters who choose words with opposite sensibility, emphasize lyrics rather than melodies, and prefers artists who are good at metaphorical expressions. She especially likes folk songs. Her first musical goals were similar to those of Kenji Ozawa and Flipper's Guitar.

Aimyon likes how men are desperate for the women they like, and she admires them, so she creates many songs from a male perspective.

She said that after watching the film Crayon Shin-chan: Fierceness That Invites Storm! The Adult Empire Strikes Back she was drawn to Tower of the Sun, Tarō Okamoto, Takuro Yoshida, and Betsy & Chris. Later, she sympathized with Tarō Okamoto's view of life and made it her goal to sing under the Tower of the Sun.

Aimyon has stated that she has not yet decided on her musicality, what genre her music belongs to, or what kind of music she wants to do. Song production and arrangers expand the image based on lyrics written by Aimyon and the demo song played with guitar. She said that her own music consists of only her guitar and voice, and it would be best if people thought that she played and sang the best, so that is her strength as a singer-songwriter.

== Legacy ==
Tomonori Shiba says that "Aimyon is the 'J.GIRL' who inherited Shogo Hamada at the end of the Heisei era, and the legitimate successor of Misu-Chiru and Spitz who has finally appeared." Aimyon has also said that she was the first star to emerge from a streaming service.

Voice actor Wasabi Mizuta has professed to being a fan, and Aimyon has also been spoken highly of by Yurano Ochi of Atarashii Gakko!. Additionally, bassist OKP-STAR, formerly of Aqua Timez, professed to be a big fan, and has been attending live performances.

== Personal life ==
Her stage name "Aimyon" was originally a nickname given to her by a friend who was the model for the song "--chan" (○○ちゃん) on her EP Tamago. She has released her work in Taiwan under the name "愛繆" (Àimóu).

Aimyon was born in Nishinomiya, Hyōgo Prefecture. She is the second daughter of six siblings. Both of her parents were 21 when she was born. Her older and younger sisters each have four children, and her grandmother has 28 grandchildren and great-grandchildren.

While in middle school, she belonged to the track and field club and served as the deputy director. She dislikes studying and has dropped out of high school. Her favorite food is ikura, and she dislikes fish and mushrooms, the latter of which is the result of choking on it when she was little. Aimyon likes animals, and she said that she used to often visit Ueno Zoo. She cites her father as her ideal type. Aimyon likes watching Doraemon and Castle in the Sky.

== Filmography ==
=== Film ===
Year	Title	Role	Notes	Ref.
2023	The Boy and the Heron	Lady Himi (voice)	Leading role	

== Discography ==
=== Studio albums ===
List of studio albums, with selected details, chart positions, sales, and certifications
Title	Details	Peak chart positions				Sales (Note: Sales provided by Oricon database and rounded to the nearest thousand.)	Certifications
Title	Details	JPN	JPN Comb (Note: The Oricon Combined Albums Chart was established on December 24, 2018.)	JPN Hot	TWN EA	Sales	Certifications
Excitement of Youth	Released: September 13, 2017; Label: Unborde; Formats: CD, digital download, streaming	10	10	13	—	JPN: 123,000 (Note: Combined sales figures for Excitement of Youth: 90,662(physical sales) + 32,124 (digital sales).)	RIAJ: Gold (phy.)
Momentary Sixth Sense	Released: February 13, 2019; Label: Unborde; Formats: CD, digital download, streaming	2	2	2	7	JPN: 306,000 (Note: Combined sales figures for Momentary Sixth Sense: 236,146 (physical sales) + 69,870 (digital sales).)	RIAJ: Platinum (phy.)
Heard That There's Good Pasta	Released: September 9, 2020; Label: Unborde; Formats: CD, digital download, streaming	2	2	2	1	JPN: 319,000 (Note: Combined sales figures for Heard That There's Good Pasta: 288,215 (physical sales) + 30,578 (digital sales).)	RIAJ: Platinum (phy.)
Falling into Your Eyes Record	Released: August 17, 2022; Label: Unborde; Formats: CD, CD+DVD, CD+Blu-ray, digital download, streaming	2	3	3	—	JPN: 103,350 (Note: Combined sales figures for Falling into Your Eyes Record: 95,968 (physical sales) + 7,382 (digital sales).)	RIAJ: Gold (phy.)
Jealous of Cats	Released: September 11, 2024; Label: Unborde; Formats: CD, CD+DVD, CD+Blu-ray, digital download, streaming	2	2	2	—	JPN: 92,546	RIAJ: Gold (phy.)
"—" denotes releases which did not chart.

=== Compilation albums ===
List of compilation albums, with selected details, chart positions, and sales
Title	Details	Peak chart positions			Sales	Certifications
Title	Details	JPN	JPN Comb	JPN Hot	Sales	Certifications
Aimyon Best Album: Chase the Lips!	Released: September 9, 2026; Label: Unborde; Formats: CD, digital download, streaming	2	2	2	JPN: 59,568	RIAJ: Gold (phy.)
Aimyon B-Side Collection Album	Released: September 9, 2026; Label: Unborde; Formats: Digital download, streaming	—	—	—		
"—" denotes releases which did not chart.

=== Extended plays ===
List of extended plays, with selected details, chart positions and sales
Title	Details	Peak chart positions		Sales
Title	Details	JPN	JPN Hot	Sales
Tamago	Released: May 20, 2015; Label: Lastrum; Formats: CD, digital download, streaming	82	49	JPN: 10,000
Nikumarekko Yo ni Habakaru	Released: December 2, 2015; Label: Lastrum; Formats: CD, digital download, streaming	106	86	JPN: 4,000
Ai o Tsutaetaida to ka Remix EP	Released: May 23, 2018; Label: Unborde; Formats: digital download, 12-inch single	108	—	
"—" denotes releases which did not chart.

=== Singles ===
==== As lead artist ====
List of singles as lead artist, with year released, selected chart positions, certifications, and album name
Title	Year	Peak chart positions			Certifications	Album
Title	Year	JPN	JPN Comb (Note: The Oricon Combined Singles Chart was established on December 24, 2018.)	JPN Hot	Certifications	Album
"Anata Kaibō Jun'aika (Shine)" (貴方解剖純愛歌~死ね~)	2015	—	44	48		Tamago
"Ikite Itan da yo na" (生きていたんだよな)	2016	67	48	41	RIAJ: Gold (st.)	Excitement of Youth
"Ai o Tsutaetaida toka" (愛を伝えたいだとか)	2017	51	20	15	RIAJ: 3× Platinum (st.)	Excitement of Youth
"Kimi wa Rock o Kikanai" (君はロックを聴かない)	2017	76	18	11	RIAJ: Platinum (dig.); 3× Platinum (st.)	Excitement of Youth
"Only Under the Full Moon" (満月の夜なら)	2018	31	47	11	RIAJ: Platinum (st.)	Momentary Sixth Sense
"Marigold" (マリーゴールド)	2018	25	3	1	RIAJ: 3× Platinum (dig.); Diamond (st.)	Momentary Sixth Sense
"Let the Night" (今夜このまま)	2018	18	9	4	RIAJ: Platinum (dig.); 3× Platinum (st.)	Momentary Sixth Sense
"Haru no Hi" (ハルノヒ)	2019	6	2	2	RIAJ: Platinum (dig.); 3× Platinum (st.)	Heard That There's Good Pasta
"The Smell of a Midsummer Night" (真夏の夜の匂いがする)	2019	18	11	7	RIAJ: Gold (st.)	Heard That There's Good Pasta
"Her Blue Sky" (空の青さを知る人よ)	2019	7	4	4	RIAJ: Platinum (st.)	Heard That There's Good Pasta
"Naked Heart" (裸の心)	2020	4	2	4	RIAJ: Platinum (dig.); Diamond (st.)	Heard That There's Good Pasta
"On a Cherry Blossom Night" (桜が降る夜は)	2021	8	5	13	RIAJ: 2× Platinum (st.)	Falling into Your Eyes Record
"Till I Know What Love Is (I'm Never Gonna Die)" (愛を知るまでは)	2021	8	5	11	RIAJ: Platinum (st.)	Falling into Your Eyes Record
"Heart" (ハート)	2021	10	8	7	RIAJ: 2× Platinum (st.)	Falling into Your Eyes Record
"My First Love Is Crying" (初恋が泣いている)	2022	8	12	16	RIAJ: Gold (st.)	Falling into Your Eyes Record
"Ai no Hana" (愛の花)	2023	7	5	9	RIAJ: Platinum (st.)	Jealous of Cats
"Anone" (あのね)	2023	4	25	22		Jealous of Cats
"Wish I Could See You, But" (会いに行くのに)	2024	14	22	21	RIAJ: Gold (st.)	Jealous of Cats
"Sketch" (スケッチ)	2025	5	12	7		Aimyon Best Album: Chase the Lips!
"While Listening to Your Dreams, I'm Weaving Funny Ideas!" (君の夢を聞きながら、僕は笑えるアイデアを!)	2025	5	12	—		Aimyon Best Album: Chase the Lips!
"Belt of Venus" (ビーナスベルト)	2025	7	16	11		Non-album single
"—" denotes releases which did not chart.

==== As featured artist ====
List of singles as featured artist, with year released, selected chart positions, certifications, and album name
Title	Year	Peak chart positions	Certifications	Album
Title	Year	JPN Hot	Certifications	Album
"Nakidashisou da yo" (泣き出しそうだよ)(with Radwimps)	2018	56		Anti Anti Generation
"Kiss Dake de" (キスだけで) (with Masaki Suda)	2019	11		Love
"Kaibutsu-san" (怪物さん) (with Ken Hirai)	2020	15	RIAJ: Gold (st.)	Anata ni Narita Katta

==== Promotional singles ====
List of promotional singles, with year released, selected chart positions, certifications, and album name
Title	Year	Peak chart positions		Certifications	Album
Title	Year	JPN Comb	JPN Hot	Certifications	Album
"Futari no Sekai" (ふたりの世界)	2017	—	95	RIAJ: Platinum (st.)	Excitement of Youth
"Hyohaku" (漂白)	2017	—	— (Note: "Hyohaku" did not enter the Japan Hot 100, but peaked at number 97 on the Top Streaming Songs chart.)		Excitement of Youth
"Even If the World Ends Tomorrow" (あした世界が終わるとしても)	2019	36	16		Momentary Sixth Sense
"What If..." (ら、のはなし)	2019	49	36	RIAJ: Gold (st.)	Momentary Sixth Sense
"Present" (プレゼント)	2019	—	57		Momentary Sixth Sense
"Dream Chaser Bengal" (夢追いベンガル)	2019	—	71		Momentary Sixth Sense
"Good Night Baby"	2019	—	88	RIAJ: Gold (st.)	Momentary Sixth Sense
"On This Day We Say Goodbye" (さよならの今日に)	2020	15	15	RIAJ: Platinum (st.)	Heard That There's Good Pasta
"Morning Sun" (朝陽)	2020	—	49		Heard That There's Good Pasta
"Super Girl" (スーパーガール)	2020	—	— (Note: "Super Girl" was first released exclusively through Amazon Music in December 2020, and later released through all music distribution services in March 2021. Charted at 28 on the Downloads Songs Chart in 2021.)		Falling into Your Eyes Record
"Futaba" (双葉)	2022	34	20	RIAJ: Gold (st.)	Falling into Your Eyes Record
"Not OK" (ノット・オーケー)	2023	—	39		Jealous of Cats
"Rhythm 64" (リズム64)	2024	—	43		Jealous of Cats
"Lucky Color" (ラッキーカラー)	2024	—	48	RIAJ: Gold (st.)	Jealous of Cats
"Zarame" (ざらめ)	2024	—	41		Jealous of Cats
"On Your Marks" (いちについて)	2025	—	60		Non-album singles
"Almost Lonely" (さながらロンリー)	2026	—	27		Non-album singles
"—" denotes releases which did not chart.

=== Other charted songs ===
List of songs not released as singles, with year released, selected chart positions, certifications, and album name
Title	Year	Peak chart positions		Certifications	Album
Title	Year	JPN Hot	CHN Airplay /FL	Certifications	Album
"Matryoshka" (マトリョーシカ)	2017	— (Note: "Matryoshka" did not enter the Japan Hot 100, but peaked at number 84 on the Top Streaming Songs chart.)	—N/a		Excitement of Youth
"Raw Like Sushi" (ひかりもの)	2019	93	3		Momentary Sixth Sense
"Because I'm in Love" (恋をしたから)	2019	— (Note: "Because I'm in Love" did not enter the Japan Hot 100, but peaked at number 32 on the Top Streaming Songs chart.)	—	RIAJ: Gold (st.)	Momentary Sixth Sense
"A World of Just Me and You" (二人だけの国)	2019	— (Note: "A World of Just Me and You" did not enter the Japan Hot 100, but peaked at number 35 on the Top Streaming Songs chart.)	—		Momentary Sixth Sense
"From the Corner Room on the 4th Floor" (from 四階の角部屋)	2019	— (Note: "From the Corner Room on the 4th Floor" did not enter the Japan Hot 100, but peaked at number 74 on the Top Streaming Songs chart.)	—		Momentary Sixth Sense
"3636"	2022	33	—	RIAJ: Gold (st.)	Falling into Your Eyes Record
"Jealous of Cats" (猫にジェラシー)	2024	36	—		Jealous of Cats
"—" denotes releases which did not chart.

== Awards ==
Year	Ceremony	Award	Nominated work	Result
2017	FM Q League Award	Grand Prix	Kimi wa Rock wo Kikanai	Won
2019	Space Shower Music Awards	Best Creative Works		Won
2019	MTV VMAJ	Best Female Video	Let the Night	Won
2019	61st Japan Record Awards	Excellence Album Award	Momentary Sixth Sense	Won
2019	Billboard Japan Music Awards	Artist of the Year		Won
2019	Mnet Asian Music Awards	Best Asian Artist - Japan		Won
2020	CD Shop Awards	Finalist award	Momentary Sixth Sense	Won
2020	Space Shower Music Awards	Best Female Artist		Won
2020	MTV VMAJ	Best Video of the Year	Naked Heart	Won
2020	MTV VMAJ	Best Female Video	Naked Heart	Won
2022	MTV Video Music Awards Japan	Album of the Year	Falling into Your Eyes Record	Won
