= Gesu no Kiwami Otome =

Japanese band

Gesu no Kiwami Otome ゲスの極み乙女。
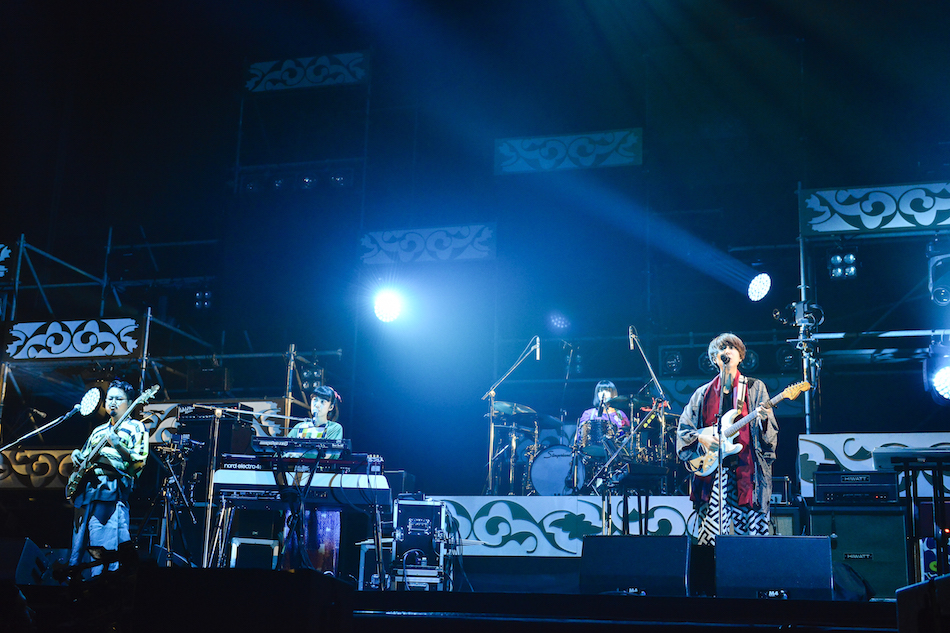
- Gesu no Kiwami Otome in 2015

Background information
- Origin: Tokyo, Japan
- Genres: Indie rock, indie pop, "hip hop/progressive"
- Years active: 2012—present
- Labels: Space Shower; Unborde; Taco
- Members: Enon Kawatani (vocals, guitar); Kyūjitsu Kachō (bass); Chan Mari (keyboard); Hona Ikoka (drums)
- Website: gesuotome.com

Gesu no Kiwami Otome (ゲスの極み乙女。; "Girl at the Height of Rudeness") is a Japanese band that formed in 2012 by indigo la End front-man Enon Kawatani. Describing themselves as "hip-hop/progressive", the band debuted in 2013 with independent label Space Shower Records, later signed by Warner sub-label Unborde. In 2018, the band left label Unborde and joined Taco Records, founded by Enon Kawatani.

== Biography ==
The band was formed in May 2012 by Enon Kawatani, out of members of other musical units. Kawatani formed the band out of people he respected, and had enjoyed performing with. Kawatani concurrently worked as the vocalist and songwriter for indigo la End, a band he had been a member of since 2009. Of the members, he chose Kyūjitsu Kachō, who was a former member of indigo la End, as well as Chan Mari and Hona Ikoka, from the bands Crimson and Microcosm respectively. The members had known each other since early 2010, from performing together at different events at the Shimokitazawa Era live house in Tokyo. They saw the project as more for fun, aside from their usual musical endeavours. The band name came from a custom tote bag that Chan Mari had brought with her to the recording studio, which had been created by a friend of her who attended art school.

indigo la End released their debut album Yoru ni Mahō o Kakerarete in February 2013. Two months later saw Gesu no Kiwami Otome's first release, the extended play Dress no Nugikata, which was recorded in only two days. The band played numerous live concerts around Japan in 2013, and in September became the regular DJs for the J-Wave radio show The Kings Place.

In December, Gesu no Kiwami Otome released their second extended play Odorenai nara, Gesu ni Natte Shimae yo, which was nominated at the 6th CD Shop Awards. In December, the band was also signed to Warner sub-label Unborde simultaneously with indigo la End. Both musical units released their major label debut released on April 2, 2014: Minna Normal for Gesu no Kiwami Otome and Ano Machi Record for Indigo la End.

In August 2014, the band released a double A-side Ryōkiteki na Kiss o Watashi ni Shite / Asobi, with the former song serving as the drama Around 30-chan: Mushūsei's opening theme song and the latter in a commercial campaign for au. The band also performed at Music Station for the first time on August 29. This was followed by the band's debut album Miryoku ga Sugoi yo in October 2014.

The following year, the band released three singles, Watashi Igai Watashi ja Nai no, Romance ga Ariamaru, including their second double-A side Otonatic / Muku na Kisetsu, with the latter song having had a prior release as a digital single. The song Romance ga Ariamaru was used in the 2015 science-fiction film Strayer's Chronicle. In January 2016, their second studio album Ryōseibai was released, reaching the top spot on the Oricon sales ranking website and selling over 100,000 copies.

In October 2016, the band entered into hiatus due to the personal affairs of vocalist and songwriter Kawatani Enon, but has since resumed to normal activities, with the band releasing their third studio album, Daruma Ringo, in May 2017. Later that year the band released the digital single Anata ni wa Makenai in October.

In January 2018, the band released their 5th single, Tatakatte Shimau yo, with the title track featuring in Japanese commercials for the mobile game Clash Royale. In May 2018, they released another digital single, Mou Setsunai to wa Iwasenai, in celebration of their six year anniversary, and announced their 4th studio album, Suki nara Towanai. Releasing August 2018, it was the first release under the group's new label Taco Records, founded by band leader Kawatani, having left previous label Unborde. The album includes the song Sasso to Hashiru Tonegawa-kun, which served as the opening theme song for the Japanese animated series Mr. Tonegawa: Middle Management Blues.

== Members ==
- Enon Kawatani (川谷 絵音, Kawatani Enon), real name Kenta Kawatani (川谷 健太, Kawatani Kenta), also known as MC.K, is the band's vocalist, guitarist and main songwriter, who also serves as the frontman for indigo la End.
- Kyūjitsu Kachō (休日課長; "Weekend Manager"), real name Masao Wada (和田 理生, Wada Masao), is the band's bassist. He was member of indigo la End under the name E ni Naranai Kachō (絵にならない課長; "Unpicturesque Manager"), before leaving the band in July 2011. From 2007 to 2009, Wada was a member of the band Aomune, performing under the name Waden (ワデン). During the group's hiatus in 2016, he joined the band DADARAY, produced by Kawatani, as bassist, along with vocalist REIS and Gesu no Kiwami Otome & indigo la End support member Etsuko. In 2018, Wada was a cast member on the reality television show Terrace House: Opening New Doors.
- Chan Mari (ちゃんMARI), real name Mari Fukushige (福重 まり, Fukushige Mari), is the keyboardist for the band. She is also the keyboardist for the band Crimson, which formed in Kagoshima in 2005.
- Hona Ikoka (ほな・いこか), real name Honami Satō (佐藤 穂奈美, Satō Honami), is the band's drummer. She has been a member of the duo Microcosm since 2009, performing drums and chorus. In 2017, she became an actress as Honami Satō (さとう ほなみ, Satō Honami).

== Artistry ==
Vocalist Enon Kawatani is the sole songwriter for the band. This is despite other members having some experience with song writing, such as Chan Mari who composed the song "Isotope" (アイソトープ) on Crimson's EP World Scape (2012). The band has been praised for their performance skills, their strong personalities and Kawatani's songwriting. The band's dynamic mixed genre sound has drawn the praise of many critics, including What's In? critic Nobuaki Onuki.

In March 2015, Gesu no Kiwami Otome was awarded the best artist award at the 7th CD Shop Awards, due to their extended play Minna Normal and their debut album Miryoku ga Sugoi yo.

== Discography ==
=== Studio albums ===
List of studio albums, with selected chart positions and certifications
Title	Album details	Peak positions	Certifications
Title	Album details	JPN	Certifications
Miryoku ga Sugoi yo (魅力がすごいよ; "Your Charm Points Are Amazing")	Released: October 28, 2014 (JPN); Label: Unborde; Formats: CD, digital download	4	RIAJ: Gold
Ryōseibai (両成敗; "Both Sides Are at Fault")	Released: January 13, 2016 (JPN); Label: Unborde; Formats: CD, digital download	1	
Daruma Ringo (達磨林檎; "Apple Daruma")	Released: May 10, 2017 (JPN); Label: Unborde; Formats: CD, digital download	3	
Suki nara Towanai (好きなら問わない; "If I Love You It Doesn't Matter")	Released: August 29, 2018 (JPN); Label: Taco; Formats: CD, digital download	12	
Streaming, CD, Record (ストリーミング、CD、レコード; "Sutorīmingu, CD, Rekōdo")	Released: May 1, 2020 (JPN); Label: Taco; Formats: CD, digital download, LP	6	
Disco no Tamago (ディスコの卵; "Disco Egg")	Released: July 3, 2024 (JPN); Label: Warner Music Japan; Formats: CD, digital download, LP	28	

=== Compilation albums ===
List of compilation albums, with selected chart positions
Title	Album details	Peak positions
Title	Album details	JPN
Maru (Best Album) (ベストアルバム『丸』; "Circle (Best Album)")	Released: May 11, 2022; Label: Taco; Formats: CD, digital download	17

=== Extended plays ===
List of extended plays, with selected chart positions
Title	EP details	Peak positions
Title	EP details	JPN
Dress no Nugikata (ドレスの脱ぎ方; "How To Take Off A Dress")	Released: March 6, 2013 (JPN); Label: Gesukiwa Records; Formats: CD, digital download	123
Odorenai nara, Gesu ni Natte Shimae yo (踊れないなら、ゲスになってしまえよ; "If You Won't Dance, You'll Be Completely Rude")	Released: December 4, 2013 (JPN); Label: Gesukiwa Records; Formats: CD, digital download	28
Minna Normal (みんなノーマル; "Everyone's Normal")	Released: April 2, 2014 (JPN); Label: Unborde; Formats: CD, digital download	11

=== Singles ===
==== As lead artist ====
List of singles as lead artist, with selected chart positions and certifications, showing year released and album name
Title	Year	Peak chart positions		Certifications	Album
Title	Year	JPN Oricon	JPN Hot 100 (Note: Sources for chart positions are as follows: "Killer Ball", "Parallel Speck", "Ryōkiteki na Kiss o Watashi ni Shite", "Asobi". "Digital Mogura", "Watashi Igai Watashi ja Nai no", "Romance ga Ariamaru", "Muku na Kisetsu", "Otonatic", "Ryōseibai de Ii ja Nai", "Feel". "Tatakatte Shimauyo",)	Certifications	Album
"Ryōkiteki na Kiss o Watashi ni Shite" (猟奇的なキスを私にして; "Give Me Peculiar Kisses")	2014	9	4	RIAJ (digital): Gold	Miryoku ga Sugoi yo
"Asobi" (アソビ; "Play")	2014	9	59		Miryoku ga Sugoi yo
"Watashi Igai Watashi ja Nai no" (私以外私じゃないの; "Not a Me Other than Me")	2015	11	3	RIAJ (digital): Platinum; RIAJ (straming): Gold	Ryōseibai
"Romance ga Ariamaru" (ロマンスがありあまる; "Romance Is Lavish")	2015	9	2	RIAJ (digital): Gold	Ryōseibai
"Muku na Kisetsu" (無垢な季節; "Innocent Season")	2015	5	27		Ryōseibai
"Otonatic" (オトナチック; "Adult-ish")	2015	5	5		Ryōseibai
"Anata ni wa Makenai" (あなたには負けない; "I Won't Lose To You") (Note: Digital single)	2017	—	—		Non-album single
"Tatakatte Shimauyo" (戦ってしまうよ; "Battling")	2018	15	24		Suki nara Towanai
"Mou Setsunai to wa Iwasenai" (もう切ないとは言わせない; "I Won't Make You Say You Feel Wistful Again")	2018	—	—		Suki nara Towanai
"Dog Man" (ドグマン)	2018	—	—		Streaming, CD, Record
"Himenai Watashi" (秘めない私; "I Cannot Hide")	2019	—	—		Streaming, CD, Record
"Toumei na Arashi" (透明な嵐; "Invisible Storm")	2019	—	—		Streaming, CD, Record
"Killer Ball o Mōichido" (キラーボールをもう一度; "Again, a Killer Ball")	2019	—	—		Non-album single
"Mou Zenbu Owari ni shiyō" (もう全部終わりにしよう; "End it All")	2020	—	—		Non-album single
"YDY"	2020	—	—		Non-album single
"Dopamine" (ドーパミン)	2021	—	—		Non-album single
"Akumu no Omake" (悪夢のおまけ; "Nightmare")	2022	—	—		Non-album single
"Slow ni Odoru dake" (スローに踊るだけ; "Slow Dance")	2022	—	—		Non-album single
"—" denotes items that did not chart or items that were ineligible to chart because no physical edition was released.

==== As featured artists ====
List of singles as featured artist, with selected chart positions and certifications, showing year released and album name
Title	Year	Peak chart positions	Album
Title	Year	JPN Hot 100	Album
"Feel" (among Unborde All Stars)	2016	53	Feel + Unborde Greatest Hits

==== Promotional singles ====
Title	Year	Peak chart positions	Album
Title	Year	JPN Hot	Album
"Black Parade" (ぶらっくパレード, Burakku Parēdo)	2013	—	Dress no Nugikata
"Killer Ball" (キラーボール, Kirā Bōru)	2013	50	Odorenai nara, Gesu ni Natte Shimae yo
"Mochi Girl" (餅ガール; "Rice Cake Girl")	2014	— (Note: Charted at number 78 on the Billboard Adult Contemporary Airplay Chart.)	Odorenai nara, Gesu ni Natte Shimae yo
"Parallel Spec" (パラレルスペック, Parareru Supekku)	2014	7	Minna Normal
"Normal Atama" (ノーマルアタマ; "Normal Head")	2014	—	Minna Normal
"Digital Mogura" (デジタルモグラ; "Digital Mole")	2014	13	Miryoku ga Sugoi yo
"Lusca" (ラスカ, Rasuka)	2014	— (Note: Charted at number 88 on the Hot Top Airplay chart and at number 69 on the Adult Alternative Airplay chart.)	Miryoku ga Sugoi yo
"Ryōseibai de Ii ja Nai" (両成敗でいいじゃない; "It's All Right If Both Sides Are at Fault")	2015	10	Ryōseibai

== Awards and nominations ==
Year	Ceremony	Award	Nominated work	Result
2014	CD Shop Awards	Grand Prize	"Odorenai nara, Gesu ni Natte Shimae yo" (踊れないなら、ゲスになってしまえよ)	Nominated
2015	CD Shop Awards	Best Artist Prize	"Gesu no Kiwami Otome" (ゲスの極み乙女。)	Won
2015	57th Japan Record Awards	Excellence Award	"Watashi igai Watashi ja Nai no" (私以外私じゃないの)	Won
2015	57th Japan Record Awards	Japan Record Award	"Watashi igai Watashi ja Nai no" (私以外私じゃないの)	Nominated
2015	Space Shower Music Video Awards	Breakthrough Artist	"Gesu no Kiwami Otome" (ゲスの極み乙女。)	Won
2015	MTV Europe Music Awards	Best Japanese Act	"Gesu no Kiwami Otome" (ゲスの極み乙女。)	Nominated
2016	Space Shower Music Video Awards	Best Group Award	"Gesu no Kiwami Otome" (ゲスの極み乙女。)	Nominated
