= Ryōseibai =

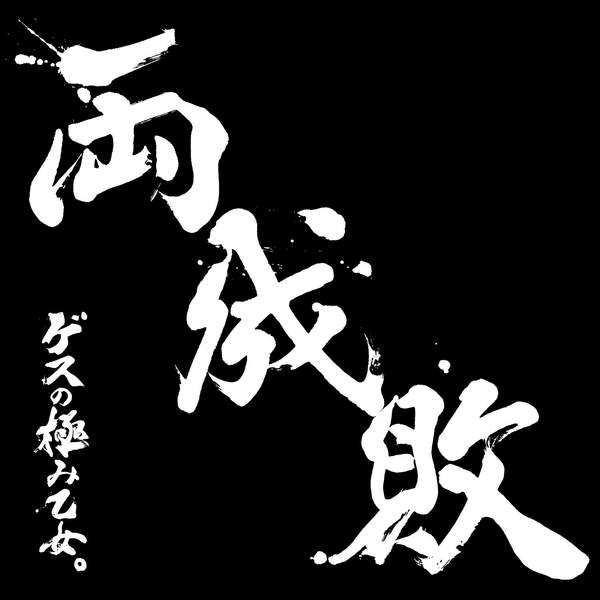

Studio album by Gesu no Kiwami Otome
- Released: January 13, 2016
- Recorded: 2015
- Genre: Indie rock, jazz rock, math rock, "hip hop/progressive"
- Length: 1:03:47
- Language: Japanese
- Label: Unborde
- Producer: Enon Kawatani

Gesu no Kiwami Otome chronology
Miryoku ga Sugoi yo (2014)	'''Ryōseibai''' (2016)	Daruma Ringo (2017)

Singles from Ryōseibai
- 1. "Watashi Igai Watashi ja Nai no" Released: April 22, 2015; 2. "Romance ga Ariamaru" Released: June 17, 2015; 3. "Otonatic" Released: October 14, 2015

Ryōseibai (両成敗, "Both Sides Are at Fault") is Japanese rock band Gesu no Kiwami Otome's second studio album, released on January 13, 2016.

== Promotion and release ==
"Romance ga Ariamaru" was used as the theme song for the 2015 science action film Strayer's Chronicle.

== Track listing ==
All tracks were written and composed by vocalist Enon Kawatani.

No.	Title	Length
1.	"Ryōseibai de Ii ja Nai" (両成敗でいいじゃない, "Who Cares If Both Are Wrong")	3:46
2.	"Tsuzukezama no Ryōseibai" (続けざまの両成敗, "Both Are Wrong, Again and Again")	4:53
3.	"Romance ga Ariamaru" (ロマンスがありあまる, "Romance Is Lavish")	3:44
4.	"Serial Singer" (シリアルシンガー Shiriaru Shingā)	3:55
5.	"Tsutomeru Real" (勤めるリアル Tsutomeru Riaru, "The Real We Work for")	3:13
6.	"Psydentity" (サイデンティティ Saidentiti)	3:24
7.	"Otonatic" (オトナチック Otonachikku, "Adult-ish")	4:26
8.	"id 1"	2:58
9.	"Kokoro Kabuku" (心歌舞く)	3:42
10.	"Selma" (セルマ Seruma)	3:22
11.	"Muku" (無垢, "Innocence")	1:20
12.	"Muku na Kisetsu" (無垢な季節, "Innocent Season")	3:31
13.	"Parallel Spec (funky ver.)" (パラレルスペック (funky ver.) Parareru Supekku (funky ver.))	5:17
14.	"Ikenai Dance" (いけないダンス Ikenai Dansu, "The Dance We Shouldn't Do")	4:20
15.	"Watashi Igai Watashi ja Nai no" (私以外私じゃないの, "There Is no Me Other than Me")	3:52
16.	"Mr. Gesu X" (Mr.ゲスX)	4:25
17.	"Kemuru" (煙る, "Smoking")	3:39
Total length:		1:03:47

== Charts ==
Chart (2016)	Peak position
Japan Oricon daily albums	1
Japan Oricon weekly albums	1
Japan Oricon monthly albums	3

== Sales and certifications ==
Chart	Amount
Oricon physical sales	102,000

== Release history ==
Region	Date	Format	Distributing Label	Catalogue codes
Japan	January 12, 2016	digital download	Unborde	WPZL-31141/2, WPCL-12297, WPZL31141LH, WPCL12297LH
Japan	January 13, 2016	CD	Unborde	WPZL-31141/2, WPCL-12297, WPZL31141LH, WPCL12297LH
