= 69th NHK Kōhaku Uta Gassen =

- Created by: Tsumoru Kondo
- Directed by: Yukinori Kida
- Presented by: Teruyoshi Uchimura; Maho Kuwako; Suzu Hirose; Sho Sakurai
- Judges: Sadao Abe; Sakura Ando; Rikako Ikee; Nao Kodaira; Takeru Sato; Tetsurō Degawa; Mei Nagano; Nakamura Kankurō VI; Itsuki Natsui; Mansai Nomura; Makoto Hasebe
- Opening theme: Mashup featuring Heisei songs performed by B.B.Queens, TRF, X Japan, AKB48, Morning Musume, SMAP, Sachiko Kobayashi, Exile and others
- Ending theme: "Hotaru no Hikari"
- Composer: Takahiro Kaneko
- Country of origin: Japan
- Original language: Japanese

Production
- Running time: 265 minutes
- Production company: NHK Enterprise Inc.

Original release
- Network: NHK General Television
- Release: December 31, 2018

The 69th NHK Kōhaku Utagassen (第69回NHK紅白歌合戦, The 69th NHK Red & White Song Battle) was the 2018 edition of NHK's television special Kōhaku Uta Gassen, held on December 31 live from NHK Hall (Tokyo, Japan). It was broadcast in Japan through NHK General Television and NHK Radio 1, and worldwide through NHK World Premium. This is the first edition that was broadcast in NHK BS4K and BS8K, and the final edition in the Heisei Period. Comedian Teruyoshi Uchimura and NHK announcer Maho Kuwako hosted for the second time. Suzu Hirose and Sho Sakurai hosted for the first time. The White Team won the event.

== The final Heisei Kōhaku ==
This is the 30th and last edition of the program in the Heisei Period, due to the abdication of Emperor Akihito, scheduled for April 30, 2019. The Kōhaku has already undergone a transition of periods. The 39th edition (last of the Showa Period) was held a week before Hirohito's death, and the 40th edition was the first ever in Heisei. The show will go through a new era transition in 2019, with the 70th edition being the first to be held in Reiwa period.

== Events leading up to broadcast ==
This year's theme, "Let's Sing a Dream" (夢を歌おう) remains unchanged until the 70th edition (2019), in support of the upcoming 2020 Summer Olympics and 2020 Summer Paralympics.

The broadcast time was announced by NHK on October 5, 2018. It will be broadcast on December 31, starting from 19:15 JST and ending at 23:45 JST, with a 5-minute break for the latest news. In Japan, the broadcast will take place through NHK General Television, NHK BS4K, NHK BS8K, and NHK Radio 1, and worldwide through NHK World Premium and TV Japan (US).

On November 9, 2018, it was announced that Teruyoshi Uchimura and Maho Kuwako would return as mediators for the second consecutive year. Uchimura expressed that he was surprised to be selected to MC the show again, and commented, "I want to aim for a Kōhaku that will remain in people's memories". Suzu Hirose and Sho Sakurai of Arashi were announced as the Red and White team leaders. Hirose expressed that she felt some pressure and responsibility, commenting, "I'm feeling the same pressure and responsibility as when I was chosen to be the heroine of the 100th Asadora ... I will do my best". In recent years, members of Arashi have served as the White team leader (Masaki Aiba and Kazunari Ninomiya for the 67th and 68th editions respectively). Sakurai has previously hosted as part of Arashi (61st through 65th editions). This will be his first time hosting alone. Sakurai expressed that it was an honor to be asked to host Kōhaku, commenting, "This important role is more than I deserve. I will work to my utmost so that the final Heisei Kōhaku will be remembered in the hearts of a wide variety of people".

On November 14, 2018, NHK released the full list of performers and a press conference announcing the participants took place. Ringo Sheena and Hiroji Miyamoto were announced as special performers. Aqours and Touken Danshi will appear in a special segment that focuses on the popularity of Japanese culture around the world. Newcomers include Suchmos, Aimyon, King & Prince, Daoko, Junretsu (ja), and Yoshiki feat. Hyde. On December 4, 2018, Saburo Kitajima was announced to appear on a special segment, due to popular demand. Kitajima announced his retirement from Kōhaku in 2013, after taking part in the show for a record 50 performances. On December 12, 2018, Southern All Stars was announced to appear as a special performer. On December 16, 2018, NHK announced that Thai girl group BNK48 would be performing with AKB48. This year also marks the last time Rino Sashihara would perform with the group, as she announced her graduation a few months prior. On December 26, Kenshi Yonezu was confirmed to perform with the white team. He originally declined his invitation to Kōhaku but later accepted after NHK proposed he perform via live feed from Tokushima Prefecture.

On December 19, 2018, NHK announced the guest judges and new voting system. On December 21, it was announced that Bananaman (ja), Naomi Watanabe, and Moeka Amamiya (ja) would lead the Kōhaku Ura Talk Channel. The song list was also released on December 21. The performance order was announced on December 27. Rehearsals began on December 29.

== Presenters and performers ==
Presenters

- Mediators: Teruyoshi Uchimura and Maho Kuwako
- Red team leader: Suzu Hirose
- White team leader: Sho Sakurai (Arashi)

Performers

Debuting artists Returning artists Special performers Special segment

| Order | Artist | # | Song |
First part
| 1 | Sandaime J Soul Brothers | 7 | "Ryusei" |
| 2 | Fuyumi Sakamoto | 30 | "Yozakura Oshichi" |
| 3 | Hiromi Go | 31 | "Goldfinger '99" Go! Go! 2018 |
| 4 | Little Glee Monster | 2 | "Sekai wa Anata ni Waraikakete Iru" |
| 5 | Keisuke Yamauchi (ja) | 4 | "Sarase Fuyu no Arashi" Touken Danshi Collaboration Special |
| 6 | Daoko | 1 | "Uchiage Hanabi" |
| Yume no Kids Show: Heisei and Beyond (presented by Satoshi Ohno and Tsuyoshi Muro) | | | |
2020 Cheering Song – "Paprika" by Foorin
| 7 | Hey! Say! JUMP | 2 | "Ultra Music Power" Hey! Say! Kōhaku Special ver. |
| 8 | Midori Oka (ja) | 2 | "Nio no Umi" |
| 9 | Yoshimi Tendo | 23 | "Sōran Matsuri Bushi 2018" Dosanko ver. |
| 10 | Suchmos | 1 | "Volt-Age" |
| 11 | Junretsu (ja) | 1 | "Propose" |
| 12 | Aimyon | 1 | "Marigold" |
| 13 | Kaori Mizumori | 16 | "Mizu ni Saku Hana・Shikotsuko e" Illusion Special |
| 14 | Sexy Zone | 6 | "Karakuri Darake no Tenderness" 2018 Kōhaku ver. |
| 15 | Touken Danshi – "Touken Ranbu" | | |
| 16 | Aqours – "Kimi no Kokoro wa Kagayaiteru Kai?" | | |
| 17 | Yoshiki (Note: Yoshiki has performed eight times as a member of X Japan. This is his first time performing as a solo artist.) feat. Hyde (Note: Hyde has performed six times as a member of L'Arc-en-Ciel. This is his first time performing as a solo artist.) | 1 | "Red Swan" |
| 18 | Yoshiki feat. Sarah Brightman (Note: First appearance on program since 1991.) | 1 | "Miracle" |
| 19 | Aya Shimazu (ja) | 5 | "Jidai" |
| 20 | Hiroshi Itsuki (Note: Hiroshi Itsuki will perform for the 48th time, tying him with Shinichi Mori who retired in the 66th edition.) | 48 | "Viva La Vida! (Ikiterutte Ii ne!)" |
Second part
| 1 | Da Pump | 6 | "U.S.A." |
| 2 | Ikimonogakari | 10 | "Joyful" |
| 3 | AKB48 | 11 | "Koi Suru Fortune Cookie" (feat. BNK48) |
| 4 | Masaharu Fukuyama | 11 | 2018 Special Medley |
| 5 | King & Prince | 1 | "Cinderella Girl" |
| 6 | Perfume | 11 | "Future Pop" Kōhaku SP |
| 7 | Kanjani8 | 7 | "Koko ni" |
| 8 | Keyakizaka46 | 3 | "Glass wo Ware!" |
| 9 | Hiroshi Miyama | 4 | "Igosso Tamashii (Kendama Sekai Kiroku e no Michi, Futatabi)" |
| 10 | Kana Nishino | 9 | "Torisetsu" |
| 11 | Sekai no Owari | 5 | "Sasanqua" |
| 12 | Nogizaka46 | 4 | "Kaerimichi wa Tōmawari Shitaku Naru" |
| 13 | Kitajima Brothers (Note: Yutaka Ooe and Takeshi Kitayama (ja)) – "Brother"; Saburo Kitajima – "Matsuri" | | |
| 14 | Twice | 2 | Kōhaku Medley 2018 |
| 15 | Exile | 12 | Exile Kōhaku Special 2018 |
| 16 | Superfly | 3 | "Gifts" |
| 17 | Daichi Miura | 2 | "Be Myself" Kōhaku Special |
| 18 | Aiko | 13 | "Kabutomushi" |
| 19 | Seiko Matsuda | 22 | Seiko Dream Medley 2018 |
| 20 | Kiyoshi Hikawa | 19 | "Shōbu no Hanamichi" Sekai ni Hibiku Wadaiko SP |
| 21 | Ringo Sheena (6) and Hiroji Miyamoto (1) – "The Narrow Way" | | |
| 22 | Yumi Matsutoya | 3 | Watashi ga Suki na Yuming no Uta Kōhaku Special |
| 23 | Gen Hoshino | 4 | "Idea" |
| 24 | Kenshi Yonezu | 1 | "Lemon" |
| 25 | Misia | 3 | "Ai no Katachi" 2018 |
| 26 | Yuzu | 9 | Uta Yell |
| 27 | Sayuri Ishikawa | 41 | "Amagi-goe" (ft Tomoyasu Hotei) |
| 28 | Arashi | 10 | Arashi × Kōhaku Special Medley |
| 29 | Southern All Stars (Note: First appearance on program since 2014. Southern All Stars celebrates the 40th anniversary of their debut.) (5) – "Kibō no Wadachi", "Katte ni Sinbad" | | |

Songs featured on the opening movie

- "Odoru Pompokorin" by B.B.Queens (1990)
- "Donna Toki mo" by Noriyuki Makihara (1991)
- "Kurenai" by X Japan (1992)
- "Boy Meets Girl" by TRF (1994)
- "Brother" by Kenji Ozawa (1995)
- "Sobakasu" by Judy and Mary (1996)
- "Love Machine" by Morning Musume (1999)
- "Sekai ni Hitotsu Dake no Hana" by SMAP (2003)
- "Kiyoshi no Zundokubushi" by Kiyoshi Hikawa (2008)
- "Love So Sweet" by Arashi (2009)
- "Rising Sun" by Exile (2011)
- "Koisuru Fortune Cookie" by AKB48 (2013)
- "Nippon" by Ringo Shiina (2014)
- "Senbonzakura" by Sachiko Kobayashi (2015) (with cameo appearance of Hatsune Miku)
- "Koi" by Gen Hoshino (2016)
- "Zen Zen Zense" by Radwimps (2016)
- "Wakai Hiroba" by Keisuke Kuwata (2017)

Songs performed during medleys

- Masaharu Fukuyama: "Zero", "Koshien"
- Perfume: "Future Pop", "Electro World"
- Twice: "I Want You Back" (Jackson 5 cover), "BDZ"
- Exile: "Rising Sun", "Heads or Tails"
- Seiko Matsuda: "Kazeta Sane", "Heart no Earring", "Tengoku no Kiss", "Nagisa no Balcony"
- Yumi Matsutoya: "Hikoukigumo", "Yasashisa ni Tsutsumareta Nara"
- Misia: "Ai no Katachi", "Tsutsumikomu Yō ni..."
- Arashi: "Kimi no Uta", "Happiness"

== Voting system and results ==
For this year, the voting system was changed. The winner of the 69th edition will be determined within 3 points.

- Viewers: 1 point for the team who get more votes through 1-Seg.
- Audience: 1 point for the team who get more votes through the NHK Hall audience.
- Judges: 1 point for the team who gets 6 or more votes from 11 judges.

Voting will be carried after all artists performed. The team who gets 2 or more votes will be declared winner of the 69th Kōhaku.

Results
| Method | Votes | | Points |
| Method | Red team | White team | Points |
|---|---|---|---|
| Guest judges | 9 | 2 | Red (1-0) |
| NHK Hall audience | 1,176 | 1,453 | White (1-1) |
| Viewers | 240,537 | 411,931 | White (1-2) |
Winner: White team

=== Guest judges ===
The guest judges were announced on December 19, 2018. They were selected for their popularity in various fields of entertainment. The judges are: Sadao Abe, Sakura Ando, Rikako Ikee, Nao Kodaira, Takeru Sato, Tetsurō Degawa, Mei Nagano, Nakamura Kankurō VI, Itsuki Natsui (ja), Mansai Nomura, and Makoto Hasebe.

Sadao Abe and Nakamura Kankurō VI are the lead actors for the upcoming NHK taiga drama Idaten (2019). Mei Nagano and Takeru Sato were the leads for the 2018 NHK asadora Half Blue Sky, and Sakura Ando is the lead actress for the currently airing asadora Manpuku. Speed skater Nao Kodaira won one gold and one silver medal at the 2018 Winter Olympics. Rikako Ikee, a swimmer, won six gold medals at the 2018 Asian Games and was named the most valuable player (MVP) of the competition. Makoto Hasebe, the captain of the Japan National Football Team, announced his retirement after the 2018 FIFA World Cup. Tetsurō Degawa, comedian, will begin hosting a new program on NHK in 2019. Actor and essayist Itsuki Natsui won the 44th Hoso Bunka Foundation Award, and Mansai Nomura, a kyōgen actor, is the chief executive creative director for the 2020 Summer Olympics and Paralympics opening and closing ceremonies.
