= Marigold (Aimyon song) =

Single by Aimyon

from the album Momentary Sixth Sense
- Language: Japanese
- B-side: "For You"
- Released: August 8, 2018
- Recorded: 2018
- Genre: J-pop
- Length: 5:08
- Label: Unborde; Warner Music Japan
- Songwriter: Aimyon

Aimyon singles chronology
| "Only Under the Full Moon" (2018) | "Marigold" (2018) | "Let the Night" (2018) |

Music video
- "Marigold" on YouTube

"Marigold" (マリーゴールド, Marīgōrudo) is the fifth single of Aimyon released on August 8, 2018. The song was performed on the 69th NHK Kōhaku Uta Gassen television special. After that, it occupied first place in the Oricon Streaming Chart for 20 successive weeks. It reached 200 million plays on streaming services in February 2020 as reported by Billboard Japan.

== Music video ==
The music video, showing Aimyon in a shaded room and skateboarding in the streets, was filmed in Shanghai and directed by Tomokazu Yamada. Yamada commented that "Our inner feelings change by the colours and lights of the townscape. We filmed the video to showcase wanting to advance those unchanging feelings toward someone. They become the light, the shadows and the atmosphere."

It has more than 200 million views on YouTube. It was also used in a Japanese commercial for Google Search.

== Track listing ==
All tracks are written by Aimyon.

| No. | Title | Length |
|---|---|---|
| 1. | "Marigold" (マリーゴールド) | 5:08 |
| 2. | "For You" (あなたのために) | 4:20 |
| 3. | "Marigold" (Instrumental) | 5:06 |

== Charts ==
=== Weekly charts ===
Weekly chart performance for "Marigold"
| Chart (2019) | Peak position |
|---|---|
| Japan (Japan Hot 100) | 1 |
| Japan (Oricon) | 25 |
| Japan Combined Singles (Oricon) | 3 |

=== Year-end charts ===
Year-end chart performance for "Marigold"
| Chart (2018) | Position |
|---|---|
| Japan (Japan Hot 100) | 48 |
| Chart (2019) | Position |
| Japan (Japan Hot 100) | 2 |
| Japan Combined Singles (Oricon) | 13 |
| Chart (2020) | Position |
| Japan (Japan Hot 100) | 8 |
| Chart (2021) | Position |
| Japan (Japan Hot 100) | 38 |
| Chart (2022) | Position |
| Japan (Japan Hot 100) | 36 |
| Chart (2023) | Position |
| Japan (Japan Hot 100) | 39 |
| Chart (2024) | Position |
| Japan (Japan Hot 100) | 38 |
| Chart (2025) | Position |
| Japan (Japan Hot 100) | 52 |

=== All-time charts ===
All-time chart performance for "Marigold"
| Chart (2008–2022) | Position |
|---|---|
| Japan (Japan Hot 100) | 4 |

== Certifications ==
Certifications for "Marigold"
| Region | Certification | Certified units/sales |
|---|---|---|
| Japan (RIAJ) | 3× Platinum | 750,000^{*} |
Streaming
| Japan (RIAJ) | Diamond | 500,000,000^{†} |
^{*} Sales figures based on certification alone.^{†} Streaming-only figures based on certification alone.
