= Tofubeats =

- Also known as: DJ Newtown
- Born: Yūsuke Kawai (河合 佑亮); 26 November 1990 (age 35); Kobe, Hyogo Prefecture, Japan
- Genres: Hip hop, house, J-pop
- Occupations: Singer, record producer, DJ
- Years active: 2008–present
- Labels: Warner Music Japan; Unborde; HIHATT; Maltine Records
- Website: www.tofubeats.com

Yūsuke Kawai (河合 佑亮, Kawai Yūsuke; born 26 November 1990), known professionally as Tofubeats, is a Japanese singer, record producer, and DJ.

Kawai began producing music at the age of 14, under the name "DJ Newtown". He initially distributed his music online through websites such as 2channel and YouTube. He later released music with Maltine Records, a Japanese netlabel, before signing with the Warner Music Japan sublabel Unborde in 2013. Kawai also manages HIHATT, a label he launched in 2018.

The video for his song "No. 1" featuring G.Rina was nominated for an MTV Video Music Award Japan for Best Dance Video (in 2014), and his album titled First Album for the Grand Prix at the 2015 CD Shop Awards.

== Discography ==
=== Albums ===
==== As Tofubeats ====
No.	Album details	Charts
No.	Album details	JPN
1	Lost Decade: First album; Released: 24 April 2013	40
2	First Album: First album on a major label; Released: 2 October 2014	11
3	Positive: Second album on a major label; Released: 16 September 2015	16
4	Fantasy Club: Third album on a major label; Released: 24 May 2017	19
5	Run: Fourth album on a major label; Released: 3 October 2018	22
6	Reflection: Fifth album on a major label; Released: 18 May 2022	14

==== As DJ Newtown ====
No.	Album details
1	high-school girl(we loved): Released: 10 January 2009
2	Cutegirl.jpg: Released: 16 December 2009
3	Sweet Days, Sweet Memories: Released: 30 March 2011
4	S.U.B. Urban: Credited as Tofubeats & DJ newtown; Released: 10 July 2011
5	West Members: Released: 16 September 2019

==== EPs ====
No.	Album details	Charts
No.	Album details	JPN
1	Beats for Rap: Released: 28 March 2008	N/A
2	Touch: Released: 25 July 2011	N/A
3	Summer Dreams: Released: 30 August 2012	N/A
4	Don't Stop The Music: First EP on a major label; Released: 13 November 2013	26
5	Disco no Kami-sama (ディスコの神様): Second EP on a major label; Released: 30 April 2014	35
6	TBEP: Released: 27 March 2020	70
7	A440: Collab with DJ Q; Released 27 January 2023	N/A
8	NOBODY: Released: 26 April 2024	N/A
9	Angels On The Dancefloor: Released: 29 May 2026	

Remix albums

1. Lost Decade Remixes (19 September 2013)
2. First Album Remixes (28 January 2015)
3. Positive Remixes (20 January 2016)
4. Fantasy Club Remixes & Instrumentals (27 July 2018)
5. RUN Remixes (4 September 2020)
6. Reflection Remixes (3 November 2022)

=== Singles ===
- See the singles section in the Japanese Wikipedia.

=== Music videos ===
Title	Director(s)
"Her Favorite" feat. Okadada & "Koromogae" "Oshiete Kensaku" feat. Noko "Shopping Mall" "Callin"	tofubeats
"Suisei" feat. Onomatope Daijin	Arasounara Ōkan Moyase
"Come On Honey!" feat. Arai Hitomi from Tokyo Girls' Style	Shunsuke Sugiyama, Kuroudo Furuya, and Shōta Mori
"poolside" feat. PES (RIP SLYME)	Shunsuke Sugiyama, Kuroudo Furuya, and Hiroyuki Ohashi
"No.1" feat. G.Rina	Takuya Hosogane and Shunsuke Sugiyama
"Don't Stop The Music" feat. Chisato Moritaka "Disco no Kamisama" feat. Takashi Fujii "BABY"	Yuki Mori
"Stakeholder"	Shunsuke Sugiyama, Yūya Yamaguchi, and Takuma Miyamoto
"Lonely Nights"	Ryoji Kamiyama
