= Dress no Nugikata =

EP by Gesu no Kiwami Otome
- Released: March 6, 2013
- Recorded: 2013
- Genre: hip hop/progressive
- Length: 21:19
- Language: Japanese
- Label: Gesukiwa Records
- Producer: Gesu no Kiwami Otome

Gesu no Kiwami Otome chronology
Dress no Nugikata (2013)	Odorenai nara, Gesu ni Natte Shimae yo (2013)

Singles from Dress no Nugikata
- 1. "Black Parade" Released: March 6, 2013; 2. "Dress o Nuge" Released: May 22, 2013

Dress no Nugikata (ドレスの脱ぎ方, Doresu no Nugikata; "The Way to Take Off a Dress") is the debut EP by Japanese band Gesu no Kiwami Otome, released on March 6, 2013.

== Background and development ==
Gesu no Kiwami Otome was first formed in May 2012 by Indigo la End vocalist and songwriter Enon Kawatani, out of members of other musical units that Kawatani respected. The band's official site opened on September 17, and on September 20 they released a self-produced demo called Otome no Nichijō.EP (乙女の日常 .EP; "Woman's Everyday.EP") to Disk Union. The band performed their first concerts in November 2012, and Otome no Nichijō.EP steadily sold at Disk Union, becoming one of the most bought releases from the site in December.

On January 27, Dress no Nugikata was announced by the band. Artist Nobumi Fukui was asked to draw cover, and was inspired to draw "eloquent rude girl".

== Promotion and release ==
On February 21, a video for "Black Parade" was released to YouTube, which was directed by Tadashi Sugimoto. The video had only been shot less than two weeks earlier, on February 10. In early April 2013, Gesu no Kiwami Otome made their first appearances on the J-Wave radio programs Radio Donuts and Hello World.

On April 20, Gesu no Kiwami Otome performed a live concert to promote the release at Shimokitazawa Era in Tokyo, entitled Gesu Otome Shūkai Vol. 1. At this concert, the band released a second demo extended play, Otome to Dance.EP. The band shot a second music video with Tadashi Sugimotoon May 12, which was unveiled on YouTube 10 days later.

Gesu no Kiwami Otome performed at the Space Shower Sweet Love Shower 2013 festival on September 1 in Yamanashi, and held their first full-scale concert in Kanazawa on September 14.

== Critical reception ==
Critical reception to Dress no Nugikata was positive. Nobuaki Onuki from What's In? felt there was a "great balance of meaning and flow" in the songs. Keita Itō noted how different the release was to the music of Indigo la End, and praised the band's sound.

== Track listing ==
All tracks are written by Enon Kawatani.

No.	Title	Length
1.	"Black Parade" (ぶらっくパレード Burakku Parēdo)	5:22
2.	"Monie wa Kanashimu" (モニエは悲しむ, "Monie Is Sad")	4:07
3.	"Gesu no Kiwami" (ゲスの極み, "The Height of Rudeness")	1:34
4.	"Momoe"	5:17
5.	"Dress o Nuge" (ドレスを脱げ, "Take Off Your Dress")	4:55
Total length:		21:19

== Charts ==
Charts	Peak position
Japan Oricon weekly albums	123

=== Sales ===
Chart	Amount
Oricon physical sales	14,000

== Release history ==
Region	Date	Format	Distributing Label	Catalogue codes
Japan	March 6, 2013	CD, digital download	Gesukiwa Records	PECF-3042
Japan	March 23, 2013	Rental CD	Gesukiwa Records	PECF-3042
South Korea	August 28, 2014	Musica Roma	Digital download	
