= Indigo la End =

Japanese rock band

indigo la End
- Origin: Tokyo, Japan
- Genre: Indie Rock
- Years active: 2010-present
- Label: eninal/Space Shower (2012-2014); Unborde (2014-2018); Warner (2018-2026); Daphnis/Sony Music Labels (2026-present)
- Members: Enon Kawatani, Curtis Osada, Ryōsuke Gochō, Eitarō Satō
- Past members: E ni Naranai Kachō, Mariko Wada, Yūsuke Ōta
- Website: indigolaend.com

Indigo la End (stylized as indigo la End) is a Japanese rock band led by vocalist and songwriter Enon Kawatani. The band released their debut extended play in 2012 with independent label Space Shower Music, and were later signed by Warner sub-label Unborde.

== Biography ==
The band first began in April 2009, however after a member change began full activities from February 2010. The original bassist, E ni Naranai Kachō, left the band in July 2011. In January he was replaced with Mariko Wada, and the band released their debut extended play Sayōnara, Subarashii Sekai in April 2012. Mariko Wada left soon after in June, with the band releasing a second extended play Nagisa nite in September.

The band released their debut album Yoru ni Mahō o Kakerarete in February 2013. Two months later saw the debut of another band of vocalist Enon Kawatani's, Gesu no Kiwami Otome, when they released the extended play Dress no Nugikata. Gesu no Kiwami Otome featured former indigo la End bassist E ni Naranai Kachō. In December, the band was signed to Warner sub-label Unborde simultaneously with Gesu no Kiwami Otome. Both musical units released their major label debut released on April 2, 2014: Minna Normal for Gesu no Kiwami Otome and Ano Machi Record for Indigo la End.

In the remainder of 2014, the band released two singles, Hitomi ni Utsuranai and Sayonara Bell the end of the band's performance at the Countdown Japan 14/15 new years music festival, band drummer Yūsuke Ōta announced his retirement from the band, citing differences in opinion for the future of the band. His final recordings with the band are featured on their second studio album, Shiawase ga Afuretara (2015).

Later in 2015, the band released the singles Kanashiku Naru Mae Ni and the double A-Side single Shizuku ni Koi Shite/Wasurete Hanataba, which was followed by another single in 2016, Kokoro Ame. In July 2016, the band released their third studio album, and second major label album, Aiiro Music (2016).

In 2017, the band's song Kane Naku Inochi was featured as the opening theme song of the Japanese television drama Inside Mari, and was released as part of the band's third major label album, and fourth studio album, Crying End Roll (2017). That same year, band leader Kawatani Enon's birthday on December 3 served as the release date for the band's first digital single, Touya no Magic. This was followed in April 2018 by a second digital single, Haru no Iutōri, and the release of their fifth studio and fourth major label album, PULSATE (2018), in July 2018.

Their fifth full major label album, Nureyuku Shishousetsu (2019), was released on October 9, 2019.

The band's name was inspired by Japanese band Spitz and their album Indigo Chiheisen (1996).

== Members ==
- Enon Kawatani (川谷 絵音, Kawatani Enon), real name Kenta Kawatani (川谷 健太, Kawatani Kenta), is the band's vocalist, guitarist and main songwriter, who also fronts the band Gesu no Kiwami Otome.
- Curtis Osada (長田 カーティス, Osada Kātisu), real name Yoshitaka Osada (長田 佳孝, Osada Yoshitaka), is the band's guitarist.
- Ryōsuke Gochō (後鳥 亮介, Gochō Ryōsuke) is the band's bassist. Formerly a support member, he was promoted to being a fully-fledged member on August 10, 2014.
- Eitarō Satō (佐藤 栄太郎, Satō Eitarō) is the band's drummer. Formerly a support member for the band's 2015 Shiawase ga Afuretara tour, he was promoted to being a fully-fledged member on March 17, 2015.

=== Former members ===
- Yūsuke Ōta (オオタ ユウスケ, Ōta Yūsuke), real name 太田 悠介, was the band's drummer. In December 2014 he left the band, after recording the Shiawase ga Afuretara album and performing at the Countdown Japan 14/15 festival.
- E ni Naranai Kachō (絵にならない課長; "Unpicturable Manager"), real name Masao Wada (和田 理生, Wada Masao), was the band's bassist from 2010 until July 2011. From 2007 to 2009, Wada was a member of the band Aomune, performing under the name Waden (ワデン). He later collaborated with Kawatani in 2012 as Kyūjitsu Kachō (休日課長; "Weekend Manager"), the bassist for the band Gesu no Kiwami Otome.
- Mariko Wada (和田 茉莉子, Wada Mariko) was the band's bassist from January 2012, but announced her retirement in June 2012. During her time with the band, she also worked as a member of the bands Boots on Avalanche and Far France, and was formerly a member of Halt.

== Discography ==
=== Studio albums ===
List of studio albums, showing selected details, chart positions, and sales
Title	Details	Peak chart positions	Sales (JPN) (Note: Sales provided by Oricon database and are rounded to the nearest hundred copies.)
Title	Details	JPN	Sales (JPN)
Yoru ni Mahou wo Kakerarete	Released: February 6, 2013 (JPN); Label: Space Shower Music; Formats: CD, digital download, streaming	112	1,300
Shiawasega Afuretara	Released: February 4, 2015 (JPN); Label: Unborde; Formats: CD, digital download, streaming	7	13,000
Aiiro Music	Released: June 8, 2016 (JPN); Label: Unborde; Formats: CD, digital download, streaming	10	
Crying End Roll	Released: July 12, 2017 (JPN); Label: Unborde; Formats: CD, digital download, streaming	10	
Pulsate	Released: July 18, 2018 (JPN); Label: Taco Records, Warner Music Japan; Formats: CD, digital download, streaming	16	
Nureyuku Shisyousetsu	Released: October 9, 2019 (JPN); Label: Taco Records, Warner Music Japan; Formats: CD, digital download, streaming	17	4,610
Yakou Himitsu	Released: February 17, 2021 (JPN); Label: Taco Records, Warner Music Japan; Formats: CD, digital download, streaming	6	
Aishuengeki	Released: October 25, 2023 (JPN); Label: Slowly Records, Warner Music Japan; Formats: CD, digital download, streaming	16	5,489
Molting and Dancing	Released: January 29, 2025 (JPN); Label: Slowly Records, Warner Music Japan; Formats: CD, digital download, streaming	11	4,351
Violet, Brimming Over	Released: June 24, 2026 (JPN); Label: Daphnis Records, Sony Music Labels; Formats: CD, digital download, streaming	19	4,431

=== Extended plays ===
List of EPs, with selected chart positions
Title	Details	Peak chart positions	Sales (JPN)
Title	Details	JPN	Sales (JPN)
Sayonara Subarashii Sekai	Released: April 11, 2012 (JPN); Label: Space Shower; Formats: CD, digital download, streaming	169	600
Nagisa Nite	Released: September 5, 2012 (JPN); Label: Space Shower; Formats: CD, digital download, streaming	167	500
Anomachi Record	Released: April 2, 2014 (JPN); Label: Unborde; Formats: CD, digital download, streaming	11	8,500

=== Singles ===
==== As lead artists ====
List of singles as lead artist, showing year released, selected chart positions, physical sales, certifications, and album name
Title	Year	Peak chart positions		Sales (JPN)	Certifications	Album
Title	Year	JPN Oricon	JPN Hot (Note: Sources for chart positions are as follows: "Sweet Spider", "Hitomi ni Utsuranai", "Sayonara Bell", "Yogisha wa Hashiru", "Kanashiku Naru Mae ni", "Shizuku ni Koishite", "Kokoro Ame", "Feel".)	Sales (JPN)	Certifications	Album
"Hitomi ni Utsuranai" (瞳に映らない)	2014	19	13	6,000		Shiawasega Afuretara
"Sayonara Bell" (さよならベル)	2014	24	17	6,000		Shiawasega Afuretara
"Kanashiku Naru Mae ni" (悲しくなる前に)	2015	12	26	8,000		Aiiro Music
"Shizuku ni Koishite" (雫に恋して)	2015	16	19	6,000		Aiiro Music
"Wasurete Hanataba" (忘れて花束)	2015	16	—	6,000		Aiiro Music
"Kokoro Ame" (心雨)	2016	18	34	4,000		Aiiro Music
"Tōya no Magic" (冬夜のマジック) (Note: Digital single)	2017	—	—			Pulsate
"Haru no Iutoori" (ハルの言う通り)	2018	—	—			Pulsate
"Aoito" (蒼糸)	2018	—	—			Pulsate
"Hokorobi Gokko" (ほころびごっこ)	2018	—	—			Non-album single
"Hanikande Shimatta Natsu" (はにかんでしまった夏)	2019	—	—			Nureyuku Shisyousetsu
"Musubizama" (結び様)	2019	—	—			Nureyuku Shisyousetsu
"Tulip" (チューリップ)	2020	—	—			Yakou Himitsu
"Yoasari" (夜漁り)	2020	—	—			Yakou Himitsu
"Yokaze to Hayabusa" (夜風とハヤブサ)	2020	—	—			Yakou Himitsu
"Shion" (紫苑)	2020	—	—			Non-album singles
"Abakeane" (アバケアネ)	2020	—	—			Non-album singles
"Furarete Mitandayo" (フラれてみたんだよ)	2020	—	—			Yakou Himitsu
"Love" (ラブ) (featuring pH-1)	2021	—	—			Aishuengeki
"Houga" (邦画)	2021	—	—			Aishuengeki
"Haruha Tokete" (春は溶けて)	2022	—	—			Aishuengeki
"Sonomamano Tsumetasade" (そのままの冷たさで)	2022	—	—			Aishuengeki
"Namae wa Kataomoi" (名前は片想い)	2023	—	51		RIAJ: Platinum (st.)	Aishuengeki
"Hitomi no Adlib" (瞳のアドリブ)	2023	—	—			Aishuengeki
"Wasureppoinda" (忘れっぽいんだ)	2023	—	—			Aishuengeki
"White Muffler" (白いマフラー)	2024	—	—			Winter Evening
"Change of Heart" (心変わり)	2024	—	—			Molting and Dancing
"Ramune" (ラムネ)	2024	—	—			Molting and Dancing
"I Was Blind" (盲目だった)	2024	—	—			Molting and Dancing
"Night Calm" (夜凪)	2025	—	—			Molting and Dancing
"Kagura" (カグラ)	2026	—	—			Violet, Brimming Over
"Whirlpool"	2026	—	—			Violet, Brimming Over
"Shimmering Haze" (陽炎)	2026	—	—			Violet, Brimming Over
"—" denotes releases that did not chart.

==== As featured artists ====
List of singles, showing year released, selected chart positions, and album name
Title	Year	Peak chart positions	Album
Title	Year	JPN Hot	Album
"Feel" (among Unborde All Stars)	2016	53	Feel + Unborde Greatest Hits

==== Promotional singles ====
Title	Year	Peak chart positions	Album
Title	Year	JPN Hot	Album
"Sweet Spider"	2013	31	Yoru ni Mahou wo Kakerarete
"Yogisha wa Hashiru" (夜汽車は走る)	2015	51	Shiawasega Afuretara

=== Other certified songs ===
List of songs not released as singles, showing year released, certifications, and album name
Title	Year	Certifications	Album
"Natsuyo no Magic" (夏夜のマジック)	2016	RIAJ: Platinum (st.)	Aiiro Music

Covers and Tributes

Year	Song	Original artists	Performed by	Album	Notes
2024	ABCDC	CreepHyp	indigo la End	CreepHyp Tribute Album 「もしも生まれ変わったならそっとこんな声になって」 (CreepHyp Tribute Album "If I were to be reborn, I would like my voice to be like this")	Released: August 28, 2024
