= Unborde =

- Parent company: Warner Music Group
- Founded: 2010
- Founder: Ryoma Suzuki
- Distributor(s): Warner Music Japan (2010–2017); Sony Music Solutions (2017–present)
- Genre: J-rock; J-pop; J-hiphop
- Country of origin: Japan
- Location: Aoyama, Minato, Tokyo
- Official website: wmg.jp/unborde/

Unborde (Japanese: アンボルデ, Hepburn: Anborude) is a Japanese record label established on December 21, 2010 as a sublabel of Warner Music Japan. The label is currently led by Ryoma Suzuki, Rip Slyme's producer.

== Current roster ==
As of June 2022:

- Aimyon
- Chelmico
- Genie High
- Shinsei Kamattechan
- Yu Takahashi
- Team Shachi
- Suda Keina
- Tempalay
- Tofubeats
- Wanima

== Former artists ==
- Akasick (2015-2017)
- Androp (2010-2016)
- Natsuko Kondo (2010-2012)
- Anri Kumaki (2011-2012)
- Band Janaimon (2015-2017)
- Q;Indivi+ (2010)
- The Beatmoss (2012-2013)
- The Privates (2014)
- Passepied (2012-2016)
- Dadaray (2017-2018)
- Rip Slyme (2010-2018)
- Tensai Band (2015-2017)
- Livetune (2016)
- Gesu no Kiwami Otome (2014-2018)
- Indigo la End (2014-2018)
- Kyary Pamyu Pamyu (2011-2019)
- Yonige (2017-2020)
- Roe (2018-2021)
- Hakubi (2020-2021)
- Capsule (2013-2021)
  - Yasutaka Nakata (2016-2021)

== Unborde All Stars (2016) ==
=== Lineup ===
- Akasick
- Androp
- Capsule
- Gesu no Kiwame Otome
- Indigo La End
- Kyary Pamyu Pamyu
- Passepied
- Shinsei Kamattechan
- Rip Slyme
- Team Shachi
- Tofubeats
- Yu Takahashi

=== Discography ===
Compilation albums

- Feel + Unborde Greatest Hits (March 9, 2016)

=== Concerts ===
- Coca-Cola presents Unborde 5th Anniversary Fes 2016 (April 10, 2016, Makuhari Messe)

== See also ==
- Warner Music Group
