= Stray Sheep =

Studio album by Kenshi Yonezu
- Released: August 5, 2020
- Genre: J-pop
- Length: 59:26
- Label: Sony Japan
- Producer: Kenshi Yonezu

Kenshi Yonezu chronology
Bootleg (2017)	Stray Sheep (2020)	Lost Corner (2024)

Singles from Stray Sheep
- 1. "Lemon" Released: March 14, 2018; 2. "Flamingo/Teenage Riot" Released: October 31, 2018; 3. "Spirits of the Sea" Released: June 3, 2019; 4. "Uma to Shika" Released: September 11, 2019; 5. "Paprika" Released: February 3, 2020; 6. "Kanden" Released: July 6, 2020

Stray Sheep (stylized in all caps) is the fifth album by Kenshi Yonezu, released on August 5, 2020. The song "Kanden" has been used as the theme song of the comedy TV series MIU404. The album sold over 879,000 copies in its first week, debuting atop the Oricon Albums Chart. It was the top selling album of 2020 in Japan according to both Billboard Japan and Oricon. The latter calculated that the album had sold 1,970,930 copies in Japan by the end of 2020, summarizing CDs, vinyls, downloads, and streaming equivalents.

According to the International Federation of the Phonographic Industry (IFPI), Stray Sheep was the world's third-best-selling album of 2020, with 2.54 million sales worldwide.

== Background ==
Stray Sheep is the first studio album in approximately two years and nine months since his previous album, Bootleg, and his first album following his transfer from Sony Music Records to Sony Music Labels.

The title is an English expression translated as "stray sheep", as used in passages of the New Testament, including the Gospel of Matthew. The album cover depicts a person wearing a sheep mask. As with his previous releases, the artwork was created by Yonezu himself. The songs on the album have collectively achieved a total of 214 awards and accolades.

The album contains 15 tracks, including the singles released since 2018: "Lemon", "Flamingo", "Teenage Riot", "Spirits of the Sea", and "Uma to Shika". It also features self-cover versions of "Paprika", originally written and produced by Yonezu for Foorin, and "Machigai Sagashi", originally provided to Masaki Suda. Other tracks include "Kanden", the theme song for a television drama, and newly recorded material such as "Placebo + Yojiro Noda", featuring Yojiro Noda, with whom Yonezu has a close personal relationship.

Yonezu had originally planned an album with a positive narrative reflecting the two-and-a-half-year period following the release of "Lemon". As part of this project, he launched the live tour 2020 Tour / Hype in February 2020, which was scheduled to visit ten cities. During the tour, he intended to write and perform a new song titled "Hype" for the first time. However, due to the COVID-19 pandemic's social and economic impact, all remaining concerts, including rescheduled performances, were cancelled following the Miyagi concert on 27 February. The planned filming of live performances also became impossible, forcing him to substantially revise his original plans. Amid the increasingly chaotic social circumstances, Yonezu was compelled to reconsider, within a short period, what kind of work he should create. This became the starting point for the album's development. Consequently, several new songs, including "Hype", were left off the album, while new material was written specifically for the project over a relatively short period.

Meanwhile, the broadcast debut of "Kanden", the theme song for the TBS Television Friday drama MIU404, was also postponed until the drama's premiere in late June due to the delay in the television series' broadcast.

== Release ==
The album was released digitally worldwide on August 5, 2020. It was available on physical formats in South Korea and Taiwan on October 16, 2020.

== Singles ==
"Lemon" is the first single of the album and was released on February 27, 2018. It served as the theme song for the TBS television drama Unnatural. The song, "Spirits of the Sea", was used for the animated film Children of the Sea. The theme song, "Uma to Shika" is used for the TBS television drama No Side Manager. "Paprika" is the representative song for 2020 Summer Olympics.

== Commercial performance ==
The song "Kanden" was released on YouTube on July 10, 2020, and reached 10 million views in four days, breaking Yonezu's own record. The studio album has sold one million copies within 10 days. Besides, the album hit number one under the J-Pop category in over 30 countries in iTunes Chart and hit number one in 54 countries under the J-Pop Apple Music Albums Chart. And the topped 20 All Genres category in 22 Countries/Regions, 6 of which hit Number one.

== Track listing ==
All tracks are written by Kenshi Yonezu.

Stray Sheep track listing
No.	Title	Length
1.	"Campanella" (カムパネルラ "Bell")	3:55
2.	"Flamingo"	3:16
3.	"Kanden" (感電 "Electric Shock")	4:24
4.	"Placebo" (featuring Yojiro Noda)	4:00
5.	"Paprika" (パプリカ)	3:22
6.	"Uma to Shika" (馬と鹿 "Horse and Deer")	4:25
7.	"Yasashii Hito" (優しい人 "Kind Person")	3:28
8.	"Lemon"	4:15
9.	"Machigai Sagashi" (まちがいさがし "Spot the Difference"; rearrangement)	4:27
10.	"Himawari" (ひまわり "Sunflower")	4:02
11.	"Stray Sheep" (迷える羊)	3:46
12.	"Décolleté"	3:29
13.	"Teenage Riot"	3:45
14.	"Spirits of the Sea" (海の幽霊)	3:54
15.	"Canary" (カナリヤ)	4:58
Total length:		59:26

== Charts ==
=== Weekly charts ===
Weekly chart performance of Stray Sheep
Chart (2020)	Peak position
Japanese Hot Albums (Billboard Japan)	1
Japanese Albums (Oricon)	1

=== Year-end charts ===
2020 year-end chart performance of Stray Sheep
Chart (2020)	Position
Japanese Hot Albums (Billboard Japan)	1
Japanese Albums (Oricon)	1

2021 year-end chart performance of Stray Sheep
Chart (2021)	Position
Japanese Hot Albums (Billboard Japan)	11
Japanese Albums (Oricon)	37

2022 year-end chart performance for Stray Sheep
Chart (2022)	Position
Japanese Hot Albums (Billboard Japan)	72

== Certifications and sales ==
Region	Certification	Certified units/sales
Japan (RIAJ)	Million	1,000,000^{^}
Japan (RIAJ) digital sales	Gold	185,000
Summaries
Worldwide	—	2,540,000
^{^} Shipments figures based on certification alone.
