= List of number-one digital singles of 2019 (Japan) =

This is a list of songs that reached No. 1 on the Billboard Japan Top Download Songs Chart in 2019.

== Chart History ==
Week	Song	Artist(s)
	"Lemon"	Kenshi Yonezu
	"Happy Birthday"	Back Number
	"Aurora"	Bump of Chicken
	"Happy Birthday"	Back Number
	"Lemon"	Kenshi Yonezu
	"Harunohi" ハルノヒ	Aimyon
	Gurenge 紅蓮華, "Red lotus"	LiSA
	"Remember Me"	Man with a Mission
	"Machigai Sagashi" まちがいさがし	Masaki Suda
	"Spirits of the Sea" 海の幽霊	Kenshi Yonezu
	"Yasashi ano Ko" 優しいあの子, That gentle girl	Spitz
	"Machigai Sagashi" まちがいさがし	Masaki Suda
	"Tsukiniji" 月虹, Moon rainbow	Bump of Chicken
	"Is There Still Anything That Love Can Do?" 愛にできることはまだあるかい	Radwimps
	"Uma to Shika" 馬と鹿	Kenshi Yonezu
	"Kasa" 傘, umbrella	King Gnu
	"Uma to Shika" 馬と鹿	Kenshi Yonezu
	"Turning Up"	Arashi
	"Pretender"	Official Hige Dandism
	"Geki! Imperial Hakuou team" <new chapter> 檄!帝国華撃団<新章>	Sakura Amanomiya (Ayane Sakura), et al.
	"Uma to Shika" 馬と鹿	Kenshi Yonezu
	"Gurenge" 紅蓮華, Red lotus	LiSA
	"A-ra-shi: Reborn"	Arashi
