= List of best-selling singles in 2018 (Japan) =

This is a list of the best-selling singles in 2018 in Japan, physical and digital sales are taken from Oricon yearly chart.

Ranking	Single	Artist	Physical	Digital	TOTAL
1	"Lemon"	Kenshi Yonezu	382,896	1,796,953	2,179,849
2	"Teacher Teacher"	AKB48	1,819,237		1,819,237
3	"Sentimental Train"	AKB48	1,471,958		1,471,958
4	"Synchronicity"	Nogizaka46	1,306,247		1,306,247
5	"Jikochu de Ikō!"	Nogizaka46	1,281,625		1,281,625
6	"No Way Man"	AKB48	1,213,501		1,213,501
7	"Jabaja"	AKB48	1,172,399		1,172,399
8	"Kaerimichi wa Tōmawari Shitaku Naru"	Nogizaka46	1,160,784		1,160,784
9	"Glass wo Ware!"	Keyakizaka46	1,021,450	133,375	1,154,825
10	"Ambivalent"	Keyakizaka46	970,268		970,268
11	"Cinderella Girl"	King & Prince	688,112		688,112
12	"U.S.A."	Da Pump		541,356	541,356
13	"Natsu Hayate"	Arashi	538,150		538,150
14	"Doraemon"	Gen Hoshino	192,701	283,746	476,447
15	"Fake Love/Airplane pt.2"	BTS	471,083		471,083
16	Flamingo/Teenage Riot	Kenshi Yonezu	259,490	209,085	468,575
17	"Memorial"	King & Prince	451,851		451,851
18	"Find the Answer"	Arashi	439,525		439,525
19	"Mabataki"	Back Number		434,455	434,455
20	"Ikinari Punch Line"	SKE48	390,770		390,770
21	"Muishiki no Iro"	SKE48	386,683		386,683
22	"Loser"	Kenshi Yonezu		382,506	382,506
23	"Idea"	Gen Hoshino		374,465	374,465
24	"Wake Me Up"	Twice	354,088		354,088
25	"Candy Pop"	Twice	340,992		340,992
26	"Warotapy Po"	NMB48	338,133		338,133
27	"White Love"	Hey! Say! JUMP	320,310		320,310
28	"Ai no Katachi"	Misia ft. Greeeen		298,189	298,189
28	"Boku Datte naichau yo"	NMB48	290,563		290,563
30	"Uchiage Hanabi"	Daoko with Kenshi Yonezu		286,771	286,771
Blank means no respective version or didn't chart.

== See also ==
- List of Oricon number-one singles of 2018
- List of number-one digital singles of 2018 (Japan)
