= Play (Masaki Suda album) =

Studio album by Masaki Suda
- Released: March 21, 2018
- Length: 57:05
- Language: Japanese
- Label: Epic Japan

Masaki Suda chronology
Green Boys (2017)	Play (2018)	Love (2019)

Play is the first album by Masaki Suda. It debuted at number two on the Oricon Albums Chart and was released on March 21, 2018. The theme song, "Sayonara Elegy", was used for the television series Todome no Kiss.

== Track listing ==
CD version

No.	Title	Music	Length
1.	"Sayonara Elegy" (さよならエレジー)	Huwie Ishizaki	4:17
2.	"Iinda yo, kitto" (いいんだよ、きっと, It's okay, surely)	Huwie Ishizaki	6:03
3.	"Mita koto mo nai keshiki 見たこともない" (Scenery I have never seen)		3:41
4.	"Kazaar on pink afro" (ピンクのアフロにカザールかけて)		4:37
5.	"Kaze ni natte yuku" (風になってゆく, Become the wind)		3:57
6.	"Serifu" (台詞, speech)		5:01
7.	"Sprinter" (スプリンター)	Hiromu Akita (Amazarashi)	5:36
8.	"Yurayura" (ゆらゆら, Fluctuating)	Masaki Suda	4:43
9.	"Kokyu" (呼吸, Breathing)		4:08
10.	"Asakusa kid" (浅草キッド)	Kenta Kiritani	4:04
11.	"Haiiro to ao (with Kenshi Yonezu)" (灰色と青, Gray and blue)	Kenshi Yonezu	5:35
12.	"Akaneiro no yuhi" (茜色の夕日, Scarlet sunset)	Fujifabric	5:23

Two additional songs, Baka ni natchatta no ka na (ばかになっちゃったのかな) and Amegaagarukoroni (雨が上がる頃に), are added in digital versions.

== Charts ==
=== Album ===
Chart (2018)	Peak position
Japanese Albums (Oricon)	2

=== Singles ===
Billboard Japan Year-end 2018 Hot 100

Song	Position
"Sayonara Elegy"	9
"Haiiro to Ao"	34

Oricon Karaoke Chart Yearly 2019

Song	Position
"Sayonara Elegy"	3
