= Oricon Karaoke Chart =

Japanese karaoke chart

Oricon Karaoke Chart is issued weekly and yearly by Oricon. It is one of the main charts of Oricon with Oricon Singles Chart and Oricon Albums Chart. Single and Album Chart both are based on sales, while this chart rankings are based on the plays in Karaoke in Japan. Karaoke is a popular cultural event in Japan. This chart could indicate the popularity of songs in Japan in another viewpoints.

== Record ==
The most consecutive weekly No.1 (as of 2022).

Rank	Artist	Song	Weeks	Ref.
1	Kenshi Yonezu	Lemon	85	
2	Golden Bomber	Memeshikute	51	
3	AKB48	Heavy Rotation	48	
4	Orange Range	Hana	42	
5	GReeeeN	Kiseki	37	

== Yearly chart history ==
=== 2010s ===
2013
Rank	Song (English name)	Song (Japanese name)	Artist
1	Memeshikute	女々しくて	Golden Bomber
2	Zankoku na Tenshi no Tēze (A Cruel Angel's Thesis)	残酷な天使のテーゼ	Yoko Takahashi
3	Chiisana Koi no Uta	小さな恋のうた	MONGOL800
4	Hanamizuki	ハナミズキ	Yo Hitoto
5	Eikōnokakehashi	栄光の架橋	Yuzu
6	Kiseki	キセキ	GReeeeN
7	Senbonzakura	千本桜	WhiteFlame ft.Hatsune Miku
8	Heavy Rotation	ヘビーローテーション	AKB48
9	366-Nichi	366日	HY
10	Tentai kansoku	天体観測	BUMP OF CHICKEN

2014
Rank	Song (English name)	Song (Japanese name)	Artist
1	Let It Go (Japanese Version)	レット・イット・ゴー～ありのままで～(日本語歌)	Takako Matsu
2	Koi Suru Fortune Cookie	恋するフォーチュンクッキー	AKB48
3	Hanamizuki	ハナミズキ	Yo Hitoto
4	Zankoku na Tenshi no Tēze (A Cruel Angel's Thesis)	残酷な天使のテーゼ	Yoko Takahashi
5	Senbonzakura	千本桜	WhiteFlame ft.Hatsune Miku
6	Memeshikute	女々しくて	Golden Bomber
7	Chiisana Koi no Uta	小さな恋のうた	MONGOL800
8	Eikōnokakehashi	栄光の架橋	Yuzu
9	So (kana de)	奏(かなで)	Sukima Switch
10	Nanbu Shigure	南部蝉しぐれ	Kohei Fukuda

2015
Rank	Song (English name)	Song (Japanese name)	Artist
1	R.Y.U.S.E.I.	R.Y.U.S.E.I.	J Soul Brothers
2	Himawari no Yakusoku	ひまわりの約束	Motohiro Hata
3	Ito	糸	Miyuki Nakajima
4	Dragon Night	Dragon Night	Sekai no Owari
5	Let It Go (Japanese Version)	レット・イット・ゴー～ありのままで～(日本語歌)	Takako Matsu
6	Hanamizuki	ハナミズキ	Yo Hitoto
7	Darling	Darling	Kana Nishino
8	Zankoku na Tenshi no Tēze (A Cruel Angel's Thesis)	残酷な天使のテーゼ	Yoko Takahashi
9	Story	Story	Ai
10	So (kana de)	奏(かなで)	Sukima Switch

2016
Rank	Song (English name)	Song (Japanese name)	Artist
1	Umi no Koe	海の声	Kenta Kiritani
2	Ito	糸	Miyuki Nakajima
3	Himawari no Yakusoku	ひまわりの約束	Motohiro Hata
4	Torisetsu	トリセツ	Kana Nishino
5	Hanamizuki	ハナミズキ	Yo Hitoto
6	Zankoku na Tenshi no Tēze (A Cruel Angel's Thesis)	残酷な天使のテーゼ	Yoko Takahashi
7	365 Nichi no Kamihikouki	365日の紙飛行機	AKB48
8	R.Y.U.S.E.I.	R.Y.U.S.E.I.	J Soul Brothers
9	So (kana de)	奏(かなで)	Sukima Switch
10	Chiisana Koi no Uta	小さな恋のうた	MONGOL800

2017
Rank	Song (English name)	Song (Japanese name)	Artist
1	Koi	恋	Gen Hoshino
2	Ito	糸	Miyuki Nakajima
3	Zenzenzense	前前前世	Radwimps
4	Himawari no Yakusoku	ひまわりの約束	Motohiro Hata
5	So (kana de)	奏(かなで)	Sukima Switch
6	Hanamizuki	ハナミズキ	Yo Hitoto
7	Zankoku na Tenshi no Tēze (A Cruel Angel's Thesis)	残酷な天使のテーゼ	Yoko Takahashi
8	Chiisana Koi no Uta	小さな恋のうた	MONGOL800
9	Umi no koe	海の声	Kenta Kiritani
10	Kiseki	キセキ	GReeeeN

2018
Rank	Song (English name)	Song (Japanese name)	Artist
1	Lemon	Lemon	Kenshi Yonezu
2	Ito	糸	Miyuki Nakajima
3	Zankoku na Tenshi no Tēze (A Cruel Angel's Thesis)	残酷な天使のテーゼ	Yoko Takahashi
4	Chiisana Koi no Uta	小さな恋のうた	MONGOL800
5	So (kana de)	奏(かなで)	Sukima Switch
6	Himawari no Yakusoku	ひまわりの約束	Motohiro Hata
7	Dancing hero	ダンシング・ヒーロー	Yōko Oginome
8	Hanamizuki	ハナミズキ	Yo Hitoto
9	Koi	恋	Gen Hoshino
10	Sayonara Elegy	さよならエレジー	Masaki Suda

2019
Rank	Song (English name)	Song (Japanese name)	Artist
1	Lemon	Lemon	Kenshi Yonezu
2	Marigold	マリーゴールド	Aimyon
3	Sayonara Elegy	さよならエレジー	Masaki Suda
4	Pretender	Pretender	Official Hige Dandism
5	Paprika	パプリカ	Foorin
6	Charles	シャルル	Keina Suda (Balloon-P) feat. V Flower
7	Ito	糸	Miyuki Nakajima
8	Zankoku na Tenshi no Tēze (A Cruel Angel's Thesis)	残酷な天使のテーゼ	Yoko Takahashi
9	Chiisana Koi no Uta	小さな恋のうた	MONGOL800
10	Hanamizuki	ハナミズキ	Yo Hitoto

=== 2020s ===
2020
Rank	Song (English name)	Song (Japanese name)	Artist
1	Pretender	Pretender	Official Hige Dandism
2	Gurenge	紅蓮華	LiSA
3	Marigold	マリーゴールド	Aimyon
4	Lemon	Lemon	Kenshi Yonezu
5	Hakujitsu	白日	King Gnu
6	Yoru ni Kakeru	夜に駆ける	Yoasobi
7	Sayonara Elegy	さよならエレジー	Masaki Suda
8	Kōsui	香水	Eito
9	Ito	糸	Miyuki Nakajima
10	Machigai Sagashi	まちがいさがし	Masaki Suda

2021
Rank	Song (English name)	Song (Japanese name)	Artist
1	Dry Flower	ドライフラワー	Yuuri
2	Neko	猫	DISH//
3	Usseewa	うっせぇわ	Ado
4	Homura	炎	LiSA
5	Yoru ni Kakeru	夜に駆ける	Yoasobi
6	Marigold	マリーゴールド	Aimyon
7	Mahō no jūtan	魔法の絨毯	Tayaka Kawasaki
8	Gurenge	紅蓮華	LiSA
9	Zankoku na Tenshi no Tēze (A Cruel Angel's Thesis)	残酷な天使のテーゼ	Yoko Takahashi
10	Niji	虹	Masaki Suda

2022
Rank	Song (English name)	Song (Japanese name)	Artist
1	Dry Flower	ドライフラワー	Yuuri
2	Cinderella Boy	シンデレラボーイ	Saucy Dog
3	Marigold	マリーゴールド	Aimyon
4	Suihei-sen	水平線	back number
5	Zankoku na Tenshi no Tēze (A Cruel Angel's Thesis)	残酷な天使のテーゼ	Yoko Takahashi
6	Neko	猫	DISH//
7	Betelgeuse	ベテルギウス	Yuuri
8	Mahō no jūtan	魔法の絨毯	Tayaka Kawasaki
9	Citrus	CITRUS	Da-iCE
10	Zankyōsanka	残響散歌	Aimer

2023
Rank	Song (English name)	Song (Japanese name)	Artist
1	Kaijū no hana-uta	怪獣の花唄	Vaundy
2	Dry Flower	ドライフラワー	Yuuri
3	Idol	アイドル	Yoasobi
4	Marigold	マリーゴールド	Aimyon
5	Cinderella Boy	シンデレラボーイ	Saucy Dog
6	Zankoku na Tenshi no Tēze (A Cruel Angel's Thesis)	残酷な天使のテーゼ	Yoko Takahashi
7	Saudade	サウダージ	Porno Graffitti
8	Suihei-sen	水平線	back number
9	Sayonara Elegy	さよならエレジー	Masaki Suda
10	Shin Jidai	新時代	Ado
