= Teenage Riot (disambiguation) =

"Teen Age Riot" is a 1988 single by Sonic Youth, the opening track from their fifth studio album Daydream Nation.

Teenage Riot may refer to:

- "Flamingo/Teenage Riot", a double A-side single by Kenshi Yonezu
- "Teenage Riot", a song by the Ataris from their 2001 album End Is Forever

== See also ==
- Atari Teenage Riot, a German band
