= Kusunoki no Bannin =

Japanese novel series

- First novel volume cover (hardcover edition)

クスノキの番人
- Novel series
- Written by: Keigo Higashino
- Published by: Jitsugyo no Nihon Sha
- Imprint: Jitsugyo no Nihon Sha Bunko
- Original run: March 17, 2020 – present
- Volumes: 3
- Anime film
- Directed by: Tomohiko Itō
- Written by: Taku Kishimoto
- Music by: Yugo Kanno
- Studio: A-1 Pictures; Psyde Kick Studio
- Released: January 30, 2026
- Runtime: 113 minutes

Kusunoki no Bannin (クスノキの番人; lit. 'The Camphorwood Custodian') is a Japanese novel series written by Keigo Higashino. The series began publication by Jitsugyo no Nihon Sha in March 2020, with three volumes being released as of May 2025. An anime film adaptation of the first novel produced by A-1 Pictures and Psyde Kick Studio premiered in Japan in January 2026.

== Plot ==
Entrusted to protect a tree rumored to grant your wish, main character must encounter various visitors seeking its power.

== Characters ==
Reito Naoi (直井玲斗, Naoi Reito)
Voiced by: Fumiya Takahashi
Chifune Yanagisawa (柳澤千舟, Yanagisawa Chifune)
Voiced by: Yūki Amami
Yumi Saji (佐治寿明, Saji Yumi)
Voiced by: Asuka Saitō
Sōki Ōba (大場壮貴, Ōba Sōki)
Voiced by: Ryubi Miyase
Toshiaki Saji (佐治優美, Saji Toshiaki)
Voiced by: Takao Osawa
Masakazu Yanagisawa (柳澤将和, Yanagisawa Masakazu)
Voiced by: Takehito Koyasu
Katsushige Yanagisawa (柳澤勝重, Yanagisawa Katsushige)
Voiced by: Miou Tanaka
Tōichirō Ōba (大場藤一郎, Ōba Tōichirō)
Voiced by: Akira Kamiya

== Media ==
=== Novels ===
No.	Title	Release date	ISBN
1	Kusunoki no Bannin (クスノキの番人)	March 17, 2020 (hardcover); April 7, 2023 (paperback)	978-4-408-53756-6 (hardcover); 978-4-408-55803-5 (paperback)
2	Kusunoki no Megami (クスノキの女神)	May 23, 2024	978-4-408-53856-3

=== Short novel ===
No.	Title	Release date	ISBN
1	Kusunoki no Urawaza (クスノキの裏技)	January 30, 2026 (Special gifts for attendees of animated films)	—

=== Picture book ===
No.	Title	Release date	ISBN
1	Shōnen to Kusunoki (少年とクスノキ)	May 1, 2025	978-4-408-53878-5

=== Anime film ===
An anime film adaptation of the first novel was announced on April 8, 2025. The film is produced by A-1 Pictures and Psyde Kick Studio and directed by Tomohiko Itō, with Taku Kishimoto writing the screenplay and Tsubasa Yamaguchi, Akiko Itagaki designing the characters, and Yugo Kanno composing the music. It was released in Japan by Aniplex on January 30, 2026. The theme song is "Katawara nite Tsukiyo" (傍らにて月夜; 'Moonlit Night By My Side') performed by Uru.

== Reception ==
The first novel has over one million copies in circulation.
