= List of number-one digital singles of 2018 (Japan) =

This is a list of songs that reached No. 1 on the Billboard Japan Digital Track Chart in Japan in 2018.

== Chart History ==
Issue date	Song	Artist(s)	Ref
Jan. 1	"Mabataki" (瞬き, Blink)	Back Number	
Jan. 8	"Mabataki" (瞬き, Blink)	Back Number	
Jan. 15	"Hero"	Namie Amuro	
Jan. 22	"One Day"	Ryuji Imaichi	
Jan. 29	"Here Comes My Love"	Mr. Children	
Feb. 5	"Here Comes My Love"	Mr. Children	
Feb. 12	"Party All Night~Star of Wish~"	Exile	
Feb. 19	"Here Comes My Love"	Mr. Children	
Feb. 26	"Lemon"	Kenshi Yonezu	
Mar. 5	"Lemon"	Kenshi Yonezu	
Mar. 12	"Lemon"	Kenshi Yonezu	
Mar. 19	"Lemon"	Kenshi Yonezu	
Mar. 26	"Lemon"	Kenshi Yonezu	
Apr. 2	"Lemon"	Kenshi Yonezu	
Apr. 9	"Lemon"	Kenshi Yonezu	
Apr. 16	"Lemon"	Kenshi Yonezu	
Apr. 23	"Lemon"	Kenshi Yonezu	
Apr. 30	"Lemon"	Kenshi Yonezu	
May 7	"Play a Love Song"	Hikaru Utada	
May 14	"Kiss Is My Life."	SingTuyo (Shingo Katori & Tsuyoshi Kusanagi)	
May 21	"Lemon"	Kenshi Yonezu	
May 28	"Lemon"	Kenshi Yonezu	
Jun. 4	Loser	Kenshi Yonezu	
Jun. 11	"Play a Love Song"	Hikaru Utada	
Jun. 18	"Play a Love Song"	Hikaru Utada	
Jun. 25	"Tatakau Senshi-tachi e Ai o Komete" (闘う戦士たちへ愛を込めて)	Southern All Stars	
Jul. 2	"Lemon"	Kenshi Yonezu	
Jul. 9	"Lemon"	Kenshi Yonezu	
Jul. 16	"Lemon"	Kenshi Yonezu	
Jul. 23	"U.S.A."	Da Pump	
Jul. 30	"U.S.A."	Da Pump	
Aug. 6	"Bōen no March" (望遠のマーチ)	Bump of Chicken	
Aug. 13	"U.S.A."	Da Pump	
Aug. 20	"U.S.A."	Da Pump	
Aug. 27	"Ambivalent" (アンビバレント)	Keyakizaka46	
Sept. 3	"Idea" (アイデア)	Gen Hoshino	
Sept. 10	"Idea" (アイデア)	Gen Hoshino	
Sept. 17	Black Bird	Aimer	
Sept. 24	"Ai no Katachi" (アイノカタチ)	Misia	
Oct. 1	"Hero"	Namie Amuro	
Oct. 8	"Sirius" (シリウス)	Bump of Chicken	
Oct. 15	"Lemon"	Kenshi Yonezu	
Oct. 22	"Adamas"	LiSA	
Oct. 29	"Hanashi ga Shitai yo" (話がしたいよ)	Bump of Chicken	
Nov. 5	"Lemon"	Kenshi Yonezu	
Nov. 12	"Flamingo"	Kenshi Yonezu	
Nov. 19	"Old Fashion" (オールドファッション)	Back Number	
Nov. 28	"Old Fashion" (オールドファッション)	Back Number	
Dec. 3	"Old Fashion" (オールドファッション)	Back Number	
Dec. 10	"Hanaka Necromancy" (徒花ネクロマンシー)	FranChouChou (フランシュシュ)	
Dec. 17	"Flamingo"	Kenshi Yonezu	
Dec. 24	"Flamingo"	Kenshi Yonezu	
Dec. 31	"Prologue" (プロローグ)	Uru	
