= Case File no. 221: Kabukicho =

Japanese anime television series

- Case File nº221: Kabukicho
- Japanese logo

歌舞伎町シャーロック (Kabukichō Shārokku)
- Genre: Mystery
- Created by: Sir Arthur Conan Doyle
- Anime television series
- Directed by: Ai Yoshimura
- Written by: Taku Kishimoto
- Music by: Takurō Iga
- Studio: Production I.G
- Licensed by: Crunchyroll
- Original network: MBS, TBS, BS-TBS
- Original run: October 11, 2019 – March 27, 2020
- Episodes: 24 + 6 OVA
- icon

Case File nº221: Kabukicho (歌舞伎町シャーロック, Kabukichō Shārokku) is an original Japanese anime television series produced by Production I.G. Most of the characters are based on Arthur Conan Doyle's Sherlock Holmes series. It aired on the Animeism programming block from October 2019 to March 2020. The series follows a team of detectives in modern-day Kabukicho as they investigate a string of murders committed by Jack the Ripper.

== Story ==
Taking place in modern times in and around Kabukicho in a re-imagining of Sherlock Holmes, a team of detectives are solving a string of serial murders committed by Jack the Ripper.

Cases hounding Kabukicho and its residents are brokered by Mrs. Hudson through Pipe Cat, an underground bar, where the detectives meet to accept the cases that interest them.

== Characters ==
Sherlock Holmes (シャーロック・ホームズ, Shārokku Hōmuzu)
Voiced by: Katsuyuki Konishi (Japanese); Ian Sinclair (English)
Sherlock is an eccentric individual who once dreamed of becoming a rakugoka but failed. He became a detective instead and is one of the detectives of detective row. He employs rakugo once he has deduced the answers to the case at hand.
John H. Watson (ジョン・H・ワトソン, Jon H. Watoson)
Voiced by: Yuichi Nakamura (Japanese); Jessie James Grelle (English)
John is currently employed at a university hospital on the west side of Shinjuku but had to cross over to Kabukichou in order to get someone help him with an odd case. His search leads him to the Pipe Cat.
James Moriarty (ジェームズ・モリアーティ, Jēmuzu Moriāti)
Voiced by: Seiichirō Yamashita (Japanese); Justin Briner (English)
James is the acting leader of the Kabukicho Irregulars, a group of children who have made it their mission to steal from the rich and support the needy. It is later revealed that he is the son of the ward mayor and has stayed in Kabukicho to track and take revenge on the serial killer who killed his twin sister.
Fuyuto Kyogoku (京極冬人, Kyogoku Fuyuto)
Voiced by: Sōma Saitō (Japanese); Aaron Roberts (English)
Fuyuto is a local Japanese detective known for his tendency to go about an orderly fashion, giving him the title of "the neat freak detective", who becomes one of the detectives brought together by Sherlock Holmes to find Jack the Ripper.
Mary Morstan (メアリ・モーンスタン, Meari Mōnsutan)
Voiced by: Nao Tōyama (Japanese); Trina Nishimura (English)
She is the younger of the Morstan siblings, who grew up with her older sister as her only companion. On the day she was taken up for adoption, she decided to run away to Kabukicho with Lucy where both eventually became detectives; with Mary becoming known as "the lil' devil girl detective" for her wit and charm. She is one of the detectives brought together by Sherlock Holmes to find Jack the Ripper.
Lucy Morstan (ルーシー・モーンスタン, Rūshī Mōnsutan)
Voiced by: Mariko Higashiuchi (Japanese); Ryan Reynolds (English)
Lucy is the older of the Morstan siblings. When they were younger, she ran away to the east side with Mary. She dresses as a man and is usually mistaken as such. She is one of the detectives brought together by Sherlock Holmes to find Jack the Ripper.
Michel Belmont (ミッシェル・ベルモント, Missheru Berumonto)
Voiced by: Yutaka Aoyama (Japanese); R. Bruce Elliott (English)
Michael is former cop who became a detective from North America who was known for his educated yet random guesses which were often true from what seemed to be utter luck, earning him the title of "the gambling detective", who becomes one of the detectives brought together by Sherlock Holmes to find Jack the Ripper. It is implied he converted to Buddhism when he moved to Japan.
Toratarō Kobayashi (小林寅太郎, Kobayashi Toratarō)
Voiced by: Tatsumaru Tachibana (Japanese); Kyle Phillips (English)
Toratarō is a local Japanese detective known for his confrontational attitude, earning him the title of "the tough guy detective", who becomes one of the detectives brought together by Sherlock Holmes to find Jack the Ripper.
Mrs. Hudson (ハドソン夫人, Hadoson fujin)
Voiced by: Junichi Suwabe (Japanese); David Wald (English)
Irene Adler (アイリーン・アドラー, Airīn Adorā)
Voiced by: Maaya Sakamoto (Japanese); Caitlin Glass (English)

== Production and release ==
=== Anime ===
The original anime television series by Production I.G was announced on August 9, 2018. The series was directed by Ai Yoshimura and written by Taku Kishimoto, with Toshiyuki Yahagi responsible for the character designs. Takurō Iga composed the music. The series ran for two cours, with the half airing from October 11 to December 27, 2019, on the Animeism programming block on MBS, TBS, and BS-TBS. The second half aired from January 10 to March 27, 2020. Ego-Wrappin' performed the series' opening theme song "CAPTURE", while Lozareena performed the series' first ending theme song "Hyakuoku Kōnen". Huwie Ishizaki performed the series' second ending theme song "Parade". Funimation licensed the series for a SimulDub.

Prior to the show being announced, it was known as Kabukicho no Yatsu (That Man in Kabukicho).

A six-episode OVA series was released on August 26, 2020. It centers on Moriarty's background and the release included the original pilot video and audio commentaries made by the main cast.

| No. | Title | Original release date |
|---|---|---|
Part 1
| 1 | "Hello Detectives"; Transliteration: "Hajimemashite tantei shokun" (Japanese: はじめまして探偵諸君) | October 11, 2019 |
| 2 | "Why Not Join the Staring-At-Eye-Moles Squad?"; Transliteration: "Naki boku ro mitsumetai wa ikaga" (Japanese: 泣きぼくろ見つめ隊はいかが) | October 18, 2019 |
| 3 | "The Dream of Fuyuto Kyogoku, the Ace"; Transliteration: "Esu・Kyōgoku Fuyujin no Yume wa" (Japanese: エース・京極冬人の夢は) | October 25, 2019 |
| 4 | "The Water's Usually Hot"; Transliteration: "Oyu wa kihonnetsume" (Japanese: お湯は基本熱め) | November 1, 2019 |
| 5 | "Offside is the Best Side"; Transliteration: "Tachiai wa furaingugimi tu" (Japanese: 立合いはフライングぎみッ) | November 8, 2019 |
| 6 | "Kobayashi the Man, Giving It His All"; Transliteration: "Otoko Kobayashi, yarussu" (Japanese: 漢 小林、やるっす) | November 15, 2019 |
| 7 | "Wife Looks Into the Future"; Transliteration: "Waifu, mirai wo mitsumeru" (Japanese: ワイフ、未来を見つめる) | November 22, 2019 |
| 8 | "Don't Take Off the Swimsuit"; Transliteration: "Mizugi wo nugaseru na" (Japanese: 水着を脱がせるな) | November 29, 2019 |
| 9 | "That Woman's Pad"; Transliteration: "Ano onna no Negura" (Japanese: あの女のねぐら) | December 6, 2019 |
| 10 | "Now Hiring Psychics"; Transliteration: "Reibai-shi kyūbo" (Japanese: 霊媒師急募) | December 13, 2019 |
| 11 | "Jack the Ripper"; Transliteration: "Kirisaki Jakku" (Japanese: 切り裂きジャック) | December 20, 2019 |
| 12 | "No More Nyan-Nyan"; Transliteration: "Niyan niyan daha" (Japanese: にゃんにゃん打破) | December 27, 2019 |
Part 2
| 13 | "First Moonlit Night"; Transliteration: "Hajimari no Tsukiyo" (Japanese: はじまりの月夜) | January 10, 2020 |
| 14 | "Take Back Your Melon Heart"; Transliteration: "Torimodose meron no Kokoro" (Japanese: 取り戻せメロンのココロ) | January 17, 2020 |
| 15 | "Where is He?"; Transliteration: "Ano hito haizuko" (Japanese: あの人はいずこ) | January 24, 2020 |
| 16 | "Michel and the Stupid Book"; Transliteration: "Missheru to Aho bon" (Japanese: ミッシェルとあほぼん) | January 31, 2020 |
| 17 | "Looking Back on Saudade"; Transliteration: "Furikaereba saudāde" (Japanese: 振り返ればサウダーデ) | February 7, 2020 |
| 18 | "Lots of Animals"; Transliteration: "Dōbutsu takusan desu" (Japanese: 動物たくさんデス) | February 14, 2020 |
| 19 | "The Curtain Rises on the Grand Guignol"; Transliteration: "Guran Ginyōru no maku wo" (Japanese: グランギニョールの幕を) | February 21, 2020 |
| 20 | "Moriarty Savors"; Transliteration: "Moriāti, kyōju" (Japanese: モリアーティ、享受) | February 28, 2020 |
| 21 | "Not Breathing"; Transliteration: "Taei" (Japanese: 絶入) | March 6, 2020 |
| 22 | "The Thread Where We Talk About Yeast"; Transliteration: "Isutokin nitsuite kataru sure" (Japanese: イースト菌について語るスレ) | March 13, 2020 |
| 23 | "Everybody Be There At Eight"; Transliteration: "Hachi ji, zenin shūgōdayo" (Japanese: 8時、全員集合だよ) | March 20, 2020 |
| 24 | "See You in Kabukicho!"; Transliteration: "Kabukichō de aō" (Japanese: 歌舞伎町で会おう) | March 27, 2020 |

=== Manga ===
A manga version was serialized in Monthly Comic Garden and written by Kinu Mizukoshi. It was released on January 4, 2020.

=== Novel ===
A novel version was serialized by Kadokawa Shoten under the Kadokawa Bunko novel label, which features an original story.

=== Web radio ===
A web radio show, known as Kabukicho Pipecat Radio, aired its first radio episode on October 9, 2019. It was hosted by Junichi Suwabe and Tatsumaru Tachibana.
