= Taku Kishimoto =

Japanese anime screenwriter

- 岸本卓
- Taku Kishimoto in Tokyo in 2026
- Born: Hyōgo Prefecture
- Occupation: Anime screenwriter
- Years active: 2011–present
- Notable work: Haikyu!!; Erased; Fruits Basket

Taku Kishimoto (Japanese: 岸本卓, Hepburn: Kishimoto Taku) is a Japanese anime screenwriter. After leaving Studio Ghibli, he was put in charge of screenwriting for Bunny Drop. Following its completion, he has worked on several series, some of which are Haikyu!!, Erased, and the remake of Fruits Basket.

== Biography ==
Kishimoto was born in Hyōgo Prefecture. After graduating from Chiba University with a master's degree, Kishimoto worked as an editor for Cyzo. After leaving Cyzo, Kishimoto worked for Studio Ghibli. At one point, he tried to get the role of head screenwriter for Arrietty, but he was ultimately not chosen by Hayao Miyazaki. After leaving Studio Ghibli, he was granted the position of head screenwriter for Bunny Drop.

In 2016, he did the screenwriting for Joker Game and Erased, both of which were nominated for anime of the year at the first Crunchyroll Anime Awards. Erased also won the award for best drama. In the Newtype magazine's awards in the same year, Joker Game won the Nogizaka46 award. In 2019, he did the screenwriting for the remake of Fruits Basket, which was nominated for best drama in 2019. Its second season won the award for best drama in the next year.

== Works ==
=== TV series ===
- Bunny Drop (うさぎドロップ, Usagi Doroppu) (2011) (screenwriter)
- Silver Spoon (銀の匙, Gin no Saji) (2013–2014) (screenwriter)
- Haikyu!! (ハイキュー!!) (2014–2020) (screenwriter)
- Prince of Stride: Alternative (プリンス・オブ・ストライド オルタナティブ, Purinsu Obu Sutoraido Orutanatibu) (2016) (screenwriter)
- Erased (僕だけがいない街, Boku dake ga Inai Machi) (2016) (screenwriter)
- Joker Game (ジョーカー・ゲーム, Jōkā Gēmu) (2016) (screenwriter)
- Magi: Adventure of Sinbad (マギ シンドバッドの冒険, Magi Shindobaddo no Bōken) (2016) (screenwriter)
- 91 Days (2016) (screenwriter)
- Hanebado! (はねバド!) (2018) (screenwriter)
- Fruits Basket (フルーツバスケット, Furūtsu Basuketto) (2019–2021) (screenwriter)
- Case File nº221: Kabukicho (歌舞伎町シャーロック, Kabukichō Syarokku) (2019–2020) (screenwriter)
- Woodpecker Detective's Office (啄木鳥探偵處, Kitsutsuki Tantei-dokoro) (2020) (screenwriter)
- The Millionaire Detective Balance: Unlimited (富豪刑事 Balance:UNLIMITED, Fugō Keiji Baransu Anrimiteddo) (2020) (screenwriter)
- Moriarty the Patriot (憂国のモリアーティ, Yūkoku no Moriāti) (2020–2021) (screenwriter)
- Don't Toy with Me, Miss Nagatoro (イジらないで、長瀞さん, Ijiranaide, Nagatoro-san) (2021–2023) (screenwriter)
- Ranking of Kings (王様ランキング, Ōsama Rankingu) (2021–2022) (screenwriter)
- Blue Lock (ブルーロック, Burū Rokku) (2022) (screenwriter)
- Bucchigiri?! (ぶっちぎり?!) (2024) (screenwriter)
- Sakamoto Days (2025–present) (screenwriter)
- Eren the Southpaw (左ききのエレン) (2026) (screenwriter)
- The One Piece (2027) (screenwriter)

=== Films ===
- Monster Strike The Movie (モンスターストライク THE MOVIE はじまりの場所へ) (2016) (screenwriter)
- The Deer King (鹿の王 ユナと約束の旅, Shika no Ō) (2022) (screenwriter)
- Fruits Basket: Prelude (フルーツバスケット -prelude-) (2022) (screenwriter)
- Blue Lock: Episode Nagi (劇場版ブルーロック -EPISODE 凪-) (2024) (screenwriter)
- Kusunoki no Bannin (クスノキの番人) (2026) (screenwriter)
- Shin Gekijōban Gintama: Yoshiwara Daienjō (新劇場版 銀魂 -吉原大炎上-) (2026) (screenwriter)

=== Web series ===
- Pokémon: Twilight Wings (薄明の翼, Hakumei no Tsubasa) (2020) (screenwriter)
- Pokémon: Hisuian Snow (雪ほどきし二藍, Yuki Hodo Kishi Futaai) (2022) (screenwriter)
