= The Boy Inside =

- Directed by: Tetsu Maeda
- Written by: Tetsu Maeda
- Produced by: Yosuke Miyake; Yasumasa Osada; Motoo Kawabata; Shuji Omata, Satoshi Akagi
- Starring: Masaki Suda; Tori Matsuzaka; Hiroki Aiba; Fumi Nikaidō; Shunsuke Murata
- Cinematography: Yoko Itakura
- Music by: Yoka Seijishio
- Distributed by: United Entertainment
- Release date: September 22, 2012
- Running time: 84 minutes
- Country: Japan
- Language: Japanese

The Boy Inside (王様とボク, Osama to Boku; lit. 'The King and I') is a 2012 Japanese film directed and written by Tetsu Maeda. It centers on a teenager having the IQ of a 6-year-old and his childhood friend, who tries to get him to fit into the society. The film is based on the manga with same name by Yamada Naito.

== Plot ==
The story involves of three boys, all childhood friends. One day, something happened which changed their entire life. One of the boys called Morio, a six-year-old boy, fell from the swing when they were playing. He remained unconscious for about 12 years in a hospital. Morio's friends and family tried to escape from the tragedy and forget about this accident. The other two boys, Mikihiko and Tomonari, had grown up and nearly forgot about Morio. After 12 years, Morio suddenly woke up and regained consciousness. However, Morio's intelligence remained equivalent to that of a 6-year-old. Mikihiko decided to help Morio to catch up with society. In the process, Mikihiko had to sacrifice a lot of things in order to spend time and look after Morio, for instance, he broke up with his girlfriend Kie, quit university and his free time, etc. Even so, Mikihiko failed to get Morio accustomed to the society because Morio still had a childish and naive heart. In the end, Morio came back to the hospital and Mikihiko continued to live his own life. Eventually, Mikihiko realised that everyone, even the ones who are as childish as Morio could not escape from the reality of growing up and has to face the world which was ugly as sin.

== Cast ==
- Masaki Suda as Morio
- Tori Matsuzaka as Mikihiko
- Fumi Nikaido as Kie
- Hiroki Aiba as Tomonari
- Masataka Nakagauchi as Jun
- Miyuki Matsuda as Keiko Mitsui

== Manga ==
The film is adapted into a Japanese manga of the same name, created by Yamada Naito, who writes in both Japan and France. The manga was first published in 1992 in Weekly Young Sunday (Shogakukan) and reissued in 1997 and was announced to be released in the form of a movie in September 2012.

== Theme ==
"After being hurt and getting lost, we become adults", is written on the film's promotional poster. The film talks about various difficulties each teenager faces when they are about to turn to an adult. It focuses on the emotional struggles of teenage life.

It is believed that each teenager has a period of time which they experience the feeling of confusion and reluctance to be a grown up. They refuse to become an adult because they know being an adult is different. Like those young friends of Morio in the film, they refused to make friends with Mikihiko, since he's an adult. They regard adults as devils and are not willing to let Morio go with Mikihiko when they are having party.

The movie intends to reflect a universal struggle that occurs with coming of age. It is believed that children do not understand an adult's way of life which is almost always scheduled with work and social life, not with play and innocent games. These children try their best to fight with the changes as they grow up, but sometimes life leaves you no choice but to follow the mainstream. Even though they are not willing to, one day they will find themselves engaged in the adult's life, like Morio in the film. Though he only possesses the mind of a 6-year-old, he eventually takes off his "crown", his party hat, indicating that he has given up on his childhood and is ready to progress into the adult world.

Also, Mikihiko awkwardly tries his best to make contact with Morio after he wakes up. This implies that the grown-ups are often eager to search for the innocence once they had but the fact is they always fail to do so as they have lost in the huge wheel of adults' affairs.

== Soundtrack ==
The theme song is "ours~ Our Footprints" (『ours～ボクらの足跡～』 ) by Good Coming.
