= Arcana (manga) =

Japanese manga series

- First tankōbon volume cover
- Genre: Horror; Psychological thriller; Supernatural
- Manga
- Written by: Yua Kotegawa
- Published by: Shueisha
- Magazine: Weekly Young Jump
- Original run: September 21, 2000 – November 15, 2001
- Volumes: 2
- Live-action film
- Directed by: Yoshitaka Yamaguchi
- Produced by: Shinjiro Nishimura; Tomoo Fukatsu; Seiichi Tanaka
- Written by: Yoshitaka Yamaguchi; Shotaro Oikawa
- Music by: Yusuke Hayashi
- Studio: Nikkatsu
- Released: October 19, 2013
- Runtime: 89 minutes

Arcana (stylized in all caps) is a Japanese manga series written and illustrated by Yua Kotegawa. It was serialized in Shueisha's seinen manga magazine Weekly Young Jump from 2000 to 2001. A live-action film adaptation premiered in 2013.

== Plot ==
Kensho Murakami is a police detective who is assigned to investigate a serial bombing at Shuei Elementary. He and his partner, Nakabayashi, learn that a doctor from a mental institution called on behalf of one of his patients about the explosion minutes before the bomb went off. This leads to Murakami's meeting with the nameless and amnesic patient whom they would eventually call "Maki", who appears to communicate with deceased spirits of the dead that tell her things which no living human would know. Murakami tries to uncover the secret behind Maki as she helps him and Nakabayashi to deal with a series of supernatural crimes committed by a mass murderer. However, as Murakami finds himself falling in love, he learns of Maki's true nature and her connection to an identical woman named Satsuki.

== Characters ==
Maki (まき)
Portrayed by: Tao Tsuchiya
Satsuki (さつき)
Portrayed by: Tao Tsuchiya
Kensho Murakami (村上 謙省, Murakami Kenshō)
Portrayed by: Masataka Nakagauchi
Mieko Tomochika (友近 三枝子, Tomochika Mieko)
Portrayed by: Mitsuki Tanimura
Yutaka Hashi (橋 雄高, Hashi Yutaka)
Portrayed by: Goro Kishitani
Nakabayashi (中林)
Portrayed by: Takuya Uehara
Michiru (みちる)
Portrayed by: Kaito
Gaku Torikawa (鳥河 学, Gaku Torikawa)
Portrayed by: Hajime Taniguchi
Munemitsu Kobayashi (小林 宗光, Kobayashi Munemitsu)
Portrayed by: Masahiro Noguchi
Taguchi (田口)
Portrayed by: Masashi Taniguchi

== Media ==
=== Manga ===
Written and illustrated by Yua Kotegawa, Arcana was first published as a one-shot in Shueisha's seinen manga magazine Weekly Young Jump on September 21, 2000; it was later published on a monthly basis starting on November 2 of that same year. It finished on November 15, 2001. Shueisha collected its chapters in two tankōbon volumes, released on December 14, 2001. Kadokawa Shoten republished both volumes on October 4, 2013.

=== Live-action film ===
A live action film adaptation, directed by Yoshitaka Yamaguchi, premiered on October 19, 2013.
