= Japanese Girls Never Die =

2016 Japanese film by Daigo Matsui

- Official film poster
- Directed by: Daigo Matsui
- Written by: Misaki Setoyama
- Produced by: Yoko Edami; Kazumi Fukase; Koji Hirano
- Starring: Yū Aoi; Mitsuki Takahata
- Cinematography: Hiroki Shioya
- Edited by: Satoko Ohara
- Music by: Tamaki Roy
- Production companies: Fukuoka Broadcasting System; Itoh Company; Plus D; Phantom Film; The Klockworx
- Release dates: August 19, 2016 (QFCC); October 30, 2016 (Tokyo); December 3, 2016 (Japan)
- Running time: 101 minutes
- Country: Japan
- Language: Japanese

Japanese Girls Never Die (Japanese: アズミ・ハルコは行方不明, Hepburn: Azumi Haruko wa Yukue Fume; lit. 'Haruko Azumi is Missing') is a 2016 Japanese comedy film directed by Daigo Matsui. It is based on a novel by Mariko Yamauchi. The film was well-received among critics due to its critique of sexism in Japan using the story of a young woman.

== Plot ==
The film opens with a montage that includes a group of high school girls entering a movie theatre, Haruko Azumi talking with her divorced friend Eri at their mutual friend Hitomi's wedding, as well as stencil graffiti artists and a burning banner using an image of Haruko's missing person poster from 2015. The film then interweaves Haruko's backstory with Aina's story in the present.

=== Haruko ===
An unmarried Haruko is shopping for her mother when the cashier, Yuji Soga, recognizes her as his former neighbor and childhood friend. Haruko leaves a family dinner early to visit Yuji next door, where she informs him that his former crush Hitomi is now married and they bond over a cat they rescued as kids.

At her accounting firm, Haruko's male coworker suggests dressing more feminine to get a boyfriend. When driving home, Haruko sees high school girls beating up Yuji and drives him home. Haruko's male coworker points out that their female coworker Yoshizawa is in her late 30s and unmarried. Outside, Yoshizawa and Haruko talk about how they are disparaged and underpaid by their colleagues. As her relationship with Yuji develops, Haruko tells her coworkers that she now has a boyfriend.

While driving, Haruko told Yuji that Yoshizawa married a French foreigner from Burkina Faso. Yoshizawa and Haruko talk about how shocked their male coworkers were to hear about the marriage and her plans to leave. A new female employee is hired at Haruko's company.

An acquaintance tells Haruko that Hitomi is having an affair with Yuji, who has quit his job. Haruko surprises Yuji and arranges a meetup that night, where she kisses him and confronts him about Hitomi, which he denies. Haruko confesses her love and is rejected, causing Yuji to storm off and move out of the neighboring house. A dejected Haruko hears a loud family argument from her bed and is sent on a shopping trip, during which she disappears.

=== Aina ===
At a Coming of Age Day event to celebrate turning twenty, Aina, a club hostess, reconnects with Yukio who has returned from his collegiate studies in Nagoya. After leaving his store job, Manabu walks past Aina and Yukio on the street, who fail to remember his name despite Aina recalling that he was in their year. That night, Aina drives Yukio home and they exchange phone numbers.

Aina buys a documentary about a graffiti artist for Yukio and recognizes Manabu who is manning the checkout. Later, Yukio tells Manabu to watch the documentary, which he enjoyed. Yukio and Manabu draw graffiti on a post, and seeing how good Manabu's art is, begin drawing graffiti with a stencil. They take a picture of Haruko's missing poster and reproduce her image widely, causing an online sensation. Meanwhile, Manabu and Yukio are in a car and are interrupted by Aina before buying supplies. At night they spray-painted several missing posters all over town. After learning that vandalism can lead to jail and a fine and hearing that the poster is inciting high school girls to attack random men, Yukio quits.

Aina discovers that Yukio called her a "slut from Manabu" and asks Manabu to help her confront him; they meet up. Manabu tries to talk to Aina who is waiting in a car outside, but is attacked by the high school girl gang. Manabu is found in his own car by a police beaten up; Yukio and Aina argue in a car about whether they are why he had been beaten up. Manabu confesses that he was behind the "Missing Girl Poster" graffiti and is hired to help the city's art director. Manabu and Yukio reconcile, allowing the latter to join the city project.

After seeing the two get famous, Aina becomes angry and smashes their displays. Aina meets Haruko, who tells her that having a good life is the best revenge and proposes that she disappear while still alive like she did. The police catch the high school girls' gang. Aina sees Haruko holding a child.

== Cast ==
- Yū Aoi - Haruko Azumi
- Mitsuki Takahata - Aina Kinami
- Taiga - Yukio Tagashi
- Shono Hayama - Manabu Mitsuhashi
- Huwie Ishizaki - Yuji Soga
- Akiko Kikuchi - Eri Imai
- Maho Yamada - Hiroko Yoshizawa
- Motoki Ochiai - Kawamoto
- Serina - Hitomi Sugizaki
- Kanon Hanakage - Highschool girls gang leader
- Yūrei Yanagi - Jiro Tsugawa
- Tomiyuki Kunihiro - Company President
- Ryo Kase - Police Officer Sawai
- Miyu Andō - Hitomi

== Production ==
The film is based on a novel called Haruko Azumi Is Missing by Mariko Yamauchi and was filmed between September 17, 2015, and October 2, 2015. Announced later that month, the film was directed by Daigo Matsui and stars Yū Aoi as Haruko Azumi. Other cast members included Mitsuki Takahata, Taiga, Shono Hayama, Akiko Kikuchi, and Huwie Ishizaki. The film was Ishizaki's first; in an interview with Music Natalie, Matsui revealed that he chose him to portray Soga because that it would be "more interesting" to have "someone who has the natural atmosphere" of someone living in the countryside. Its script was written by Misaki Setoyama and produced by Yoko Eimi. The music was provided by Tamaki Roy and Shionoya Daiki was in charge of the cinematography. Chatmonchy provided the theme song entitled "Kienai Hoshi" (消えない星; lit. 'The Unfading Star').

== Release ==
Before its release, as a promotion, an iPhone app was released announcing the premiere date. The app allows users to create graffiti art that appears in the film using photos they have taken. The film was screened early on August 19, 2016, in the Qualite Fantastic! Cinema Collection 2016 held in Osaka and Aichi and was selected to be one of the two films that represented Japan at the 29th Tokyo International Film Festival. It was released in Japan on December 3, 2016 and was rescreened at the Sanuki Film Festival 2017 as part of the opening lineup. Distribution was handled by Phantom Films.

== Reception ==
=== Critical reception ===
The film received 100% on the movie review aggregator website Rotten Tomatoes's "tomatometer", based on six reviews. Takako Sunaga of Eiga.com praised Daigo Matsui for creating "a pop, light-hearted work with breadth and hope" rather than a "cruel story of women in the countryside". Mark Schilling complimented Matsui's portrayal of its female characters and for "graphically" depicting female work culture in Japan. Jessica Kiang concluded that its portrayal of sexism and misogyny in the Japanese work culture was "pop-art, edgy social critique, and a strangely moving prayer for all the gone girls." The A.V. Club called it an "anarchic cry of defiance" over Japan's "patriarchy problem" and "an impressionistic, kaleidoscopic portrait of life as a woman in modern-day Japan".

=== Accolades ===
Year	Award	Category	Recipient	Result	Ref.
2016	29th Tokyo International Film Festival	Arigato Award	Mitsuki Takahata	Won	
2017	30th Nikkan Sports Film Award	Best Actress	Yū Aoi	Won	
