= Eren the Southpaw =

Japanese manga series

- First tankōbon volume cover of the remake version

左ききのエレン (Hidarikiki no Eren)
- Genre: Drama
- Manga

Webcomic
- Written by: Kappi
- Original run: March 24, 2016 – September 21, 2017
- Manga

Remake
- Written by: Kappi
- Illustrated by: nifuni
- Published by: Shueisha
- Imprint: Jump Comics+
- Magazine: Shōnen Jump+
- Original run: October 7, 2017 – August 12, 2026
- Volumes: 26
- Television drama
- Directed by: Ryō Miyawaki; Hitomi Kitagawa
- Written by: Keiko Kaname; Akahiko Takaishi
- Studio: MBS; Kyodo Television
- Original network: MBS, TBS
- Original run: October 21, 2019 – December 23, 2019
- Episodes: 10
- Anime television series
- Directed by: Toshimasa Suzuki
- Produced by: Tasuku Honda; Ruriko Kikuchi; Masaaki Terada; Junko Ooishi; Yuuichirou Ootani; Ami Endou; Kengo Tanaka
- Written by: Taku Kishimoto
- Music by: Pasocom Music Club
- Studio: Signal.MD; Production I.G
- Licensed by: Crunchyroll
- Original network: TXN (TV Tokyo)
- Original run: April 8, 2026 – July 1, 2026
- Episodes: 13
- icon

Eren the Southpaw (Japanese: 左ききのエレン, Hepburn: Hidarikiki no Eren) is a Japanese web manga series written and illustrated by Kappi. It was published on cakes web manga service from March 2016 to September 2017. A remake version, illustrated by nifuni, was published on Shueisha's online platform Shōnen Jump+ from October 2017 to August 2026, with its chapters collected in 26 tankōbon volumes. A 10-episode television drama adaptation was broadcast on MBS and TBS from October to December 2019. An anime television series adaptation produced by Signal.MD and Production I.G aired from April to July 2026.

== Plot ==
Halfway through high school, everyone is starting to consider what their plans are for their future careers. One day, Kōichi Asakura is shocked to see graffiti on the wall of an art museum. He finds out it was created by Eren Yamagishi, a left-handed high school girl. The two soon recognize each other's talents for art and set out on their own paths, with Kōichi wanting to become a designer and Eren a painter.

== Characters ==
Kōichi Asakura (朝倉 光一, Asakura Kōichi)
Voiced by: Shōya Chiba
Portrayed by: Fūju Kamio
Eren Yamagishi (山岸 エレン, Yamagishi Eren)
Voiced by: Yumi Uchiyama
Portrayed by: Elaiza Ikeda
Sayuri Katō (加藤 さゆり, Katō Sayuri)
Voiced by: Yui Ishikawa
Portrayed by: Yurika Nakamura
Akari Kishi (岸 あかり, Kishi Akari)
Voiced by: Akira Sekine
Portrayed by: Alissa Yagi
Yūsuke Kamiya (神谷 雄介, Kamiya Yūsuke)
Voiced by: Kazuyuki Okitsu
Portrayed by: Huwie Ishizaki
Yurina Mitsuhashi (三橋 由利奈, Mitsuhashi Yurina)
Voiced by: Yurina Amami
Portrayed by: Yui Imaizumi
Hajime Yanagi (柳 一, Yanagi Hajime)
Voiced by: Kōji Yusa
Portrayed by: Tomomi Maruyama
Shun Rukawa (流川俊, Rukawa Shun)
Voiced by: Tarusuke Shingaki
Portrayed by: Kaito Yoshimura
Yūko Akane (朱音優子, Akane Yūko)
Voiced by: Asaki Yuikawa
Portrayed by: Makoto Tanaka
Ifū Sakuma (佐久間威風, Sakuma Ifū)
Voiced by: Kenichirou Matsuda
Portrayed by: Shunya Itabashi

== Media ==
=== Webcomic ===
Written and illustrated by Kappi, Eren the Southpaw was serialized on cakes web manga service from March 24, 2016, to September 21, 2017.

=== Manga ===
A manga adaptation, illustrated by nifuni, was published on Shueisha's online platform Shōnen Jump+ from October 7, 2017, to October 8, 2022; an additional chapter was published on December 2 of the same year. The series resumed publication on Shōnen Jump+ on March 4, 2026, and finished on August 12 of the same year. Shueisha has collected its chapters into 26 tankōbon volumes, released from December 4, 2017, to September 4, 2026.

==== Volumes ====
| No. | Japanese release date | Japanese ISBN |
|---|---|---|
| 1 | December 4, 2017 | 978-4-08-881298-4 |
| 2 | March 2, 2018 | 978-4-08-881345-5 |
| 3 | May 2, 2018 | 978-4-08-881417-9 |
| 4 | August 3, 2018 | 978-4-08-881542-8 |
| 5 | October 4, 2018 | 978-4-08-881629-6 |
| 6 | January 4, 2019 | 978-4-08-881742-2 |
| 7 | March 4, 2019 | 978-4-08-881781-1 |
| 8 | June 4, 2019 | 978-4-08-882001-9 |
| 9 | October 4, 2019 | 978-4-08-882009-5 |
| 10 | November 1, 2019 | 978-4-08-882108-5 |
| 11 | January 4, 2020 | 978-4-08-882180-1 |
| 12 | April 3, 2020 | 978-4-08-882276-1 |
| 13 | August 4, 2020 | 978-4-08-882362-1 |
| 14 | November 4, 2020 | 978-4-08-882477-2 |
| 15 | February 4, 2021 | 978-4-08-882618-9 |
| 16 | April 30, 2021 | 978-4-08-882661-5 |
| 17 | August 4, 2021 | 978-4-08-882777-3 |
| 18 | November 4, 2021 | 978-4-08-882821-3 |
| 19 | February 4, 2022 | 978-4-08-883040-7 |
| 20 | May 2, 2022 | 978-4-08-883139-8 |
| 21 | August 4, 2022 | 978-4-08-883211-1 |
| 22 | November 4, 2022 | 978-4-08-883299-9 |
| 23 | December 2, 2022 | 978-4-08-883349-1 |
| 24 | December 2, 2022 | 978-4-08-883404-7 |
| 25 | May 1, 2026 | 978-4-08-885122-8 |
| 26 | September 4, 2026 | 978-4-08-885220-1 |

=== Drama ===
A 10-episode television drama adaptation that featured Elaiza Ikeda and Fūju Kamio in lead roles was broadcast on MBS and TBS from October 21 to December 23, 2019. (Note: MBS listed the air dates for the series on Sunday at 24:50, which is effectively Monday at 00:50 a.m. JST.)

=== Anime ===
In December 2022, it was announced that the series would receive an anime adaptation. It was later revealed to be a television series that was produced by Signal.MD and Production I.G and directed by Toshimasa Suzuki, with series composition handled by Taku Kishimoto, characters designed by Yuka Fukuchi and Akane Tamai, who also serve as chief animation directors, and music composed by Pasocom Music Club. The series aired from April 8 to July 1, 2026, on TV Tokyo and its affiliates. (Note: TV Tokyo listed the series air dates on Tuesday at 24:00, which is effectively Wednesday at midnight JST.) The opening theme song is "Funkin' Beautiful", performed by ALI feat. ZORN, and the ending theme song is "New Walk", performed by Ima Murasaki. Crunchyroll is streaming the series.

==== Episodes ====
| No. | Title | Directed by (Note: Production staff information is taken from the ending credits of each episode.) | Written by | Storyboarded by | Original release date |
|---|---|---|---|---|---|
| 1 | "The Basquiat of Yokohama"; Transliteration: "Yokohama no Basukia" (Japanese: 横浜のバスキア) | Toshimasa Suzuki | Taku Kishimoto | Toshimasa Suzuki | April 8, 2026 |
| 2 | "There's Something Beyond This, Y'know"; Transliteration: "Kono Saki ga Arunda yo" (Japanese: この先があるんだよ) | Ryūtarō Awabe | Taku Kishimoto | Ryūtarō Awabe | April 15, 2026 |
| 3 | "All I've Got Is Guts, After All"; Transliteration: "Ore, Gattsu Shika Nainde" (Japanese: 俺、ガッツしかないんで) | Tohru Kitaoji | Taku Kishimoto | Hideaki Ōba | April 22, 2026 |
| 4 | "When You Find Yourself the Best Team"; Transliteration: "Saikō no Chīmu to Deatta Toki" (Japanese: 最高のチームと出会った時) | Kazuma Satō | Yūki Takabayashi | Minoru Ōhara | April 29, 2026 |
| 5 | "The Life of the One Who Shines the Light"; Transliteration: "Terasu Gawa no Jinsei" (Japanese: 照らす側の人生) | Yūta Mikami | Taku Kishimoto | Shinpei Nagai & Toshimasa Suzuki | May 6, 2026 |
| 6 | "The Two on Opposite Shores"; Transliteration: "Taigan no Futari" (Japanese: 対岸の二人) | Shōta Hamada | Taku Kishimoto | Shinpei Nagai & Toshimasa Suzuki | May 13, 2026 |
| 7 | "Don't Give That Person Happiness"; Transliteration: "Ano Hito o Shiawaseni Shinaide" (Japanese: あの人を幸せにしないで) | Kazuma Satō | Seiki Kimura | Takahiro Kawanami | May 20, 2026 |
| 8 | "Don't You Dare Take This Job Lightly"; Transliteration: "Kono Shigoto o Nameru na" (Japanese: この仕事をなめるな) | Masayuki Matsumoto | Taku Kishimoto | Shinpei Nagai & Toshimasa Suzuki | May 27, 2026 |
| 9 | "I Will Emit a Light and Disappear"; Transliteration: "Watashi wa Hikari o Hanatte Kiesaru" (Japanese: 私は光を放って消え去る) | Won-Hoe Kim | Amane Honda | Daisuke Shimamura | June 3, 2026 |
| 10 | "My Life Never Started After All"; Transliteration: "Ore no Jinsei wa Hajimaranakatta na" (Japanese: 俺の人生は始まらなかったな) | Yūya Tanaka & Sorairo Kumaneko | Yūki Takabayashi | Kiyotaka Ōhata | June 10, 2026 |
| 11 | "Eren the Southpaw" | Yūta Mikami, Takatoshi Suzuki, Jun Satō, Fūko Abe, Kenichi Matsuzawa, Claire Barbou des Courières & Shunsuke Tada | Taku Kishimoto & Tasuku Honda | Toshimasa Suzuki | June 17, 2026 |
| 12 | "The Perfect Me"; Transliteration: "Kanpekina Oreda" (Japanese: 完璧なオレだ) | Masayuki Matsumoto | Taku Kishimoto | Kiyotaka Ōhata | June 24, 2026 |
| 13 | "To All The People Who Couldn't Become Geniuses"; Transliteration: "Tensai ni Narenakatta Subete no Hito e" (Japanese: 天才になれなかった全ての人へ) | Hitoyuki Matsui & Tomo Matsukawa | Taku Kishimoto | Kiyotaka Ōhata | July 1, 2026 |

== Reception ==
The manga was recommended by manga artist Yuki Suetsugu.
