= Uma to Shika =

Single by Kenshi Yonezu

from the album Stray Sheep
- Language: Japanese
- B-side: "Spirits of the Sea"; "Deshomasho"
- Released: September 11, 2019
- Genre: J-pop
- Length: 11:19
- Label: Sony Music Labels
- Songwriter: Kenshi Yonezu
- Producer: Kenshi Yonezu

Kenshi Yonezu singles chronology
"Spirits of the Sea" (2019)	"Uma to Shika" (2019)	"Paprika" (2020)

Music videos
- "Uma to Shika" on YouTube
- "Spirits of the Sea" on YouTube

"Uma to Shika" (Japanese: 馬と鹿; lit. 'Horse and Deer') is the 10th single by Kenshi Yonezu. It was released on September 11, 2019.

== Background ==
"Uma to Shika" is the theme song of TBS television drama No Side Manager. The single features two B-side songs: "Spirits of the Sea" (海の幽霊, Umi no Yūrei), used as the theme song of Children of the Sea, and "Deshomasho" (でしょましょ, Probably).

The title of the song (馬と鹿- "Uma to shika") is a play on words - putting the two kanjis which make up the word "baka" (馬鹿- "Stupid") with the particle "to" (と- and) between them, to make the phrase “horse and deer”.

Preview events were held for "Spirits of the Sea" and "Uma to Shika".

== Track listing ==
All music composed by Kenshi Yonezu.

No.	Title	Length
1.	"Uma to Shika" (馬と鹿)	4:25
2.	"Spirits of the Sea" (海の幽霊)	3:54
3.	"Deshomasho" (でしょましょ)	2:52
Total length:		11:11

== Charts ==
=== Weekly charts ===
Weekly chart performance for "Uma to Shika"
Chart (2019-2020)	Peak position
Japan (Japan Hot 100)	1
Japan (Oricon)	2
US World Digital Song Sales (Billboard)	25

Weekly chart performance for "Spirits of the Sea"
Chart (2019)	Peak position
Japan (Japan Hot 100)	1

Weekly chart performance for "Deshomasho"
Chart (2019)	Peak position
Japan (Japan Hot 100)	50

=== Year-end charts ===
Year-end chart performance for "Uma to Shika"
Chart (2019)	Position
Japan (Japan Hot 100)	5

Chart (2020)	Position
Japan (Japan Hot 100)	21

Year-end chart performance for "Spirits of the Sea"
Chart (2019)	Position
Japan (Japan Hot 100)	30

=== All-time charts ===
Chart (2008–2022)	Position
Japan (Japan Hot 100)	33

== Certifications ==
Certifications for "Uma to Shika"
Region	Certification	Certified units/sales
Japan (RIAJ) Physical	2× Platinum	500,000^{^}
Japan (RIAJ) Digital	Million	1,000,000^{*}
Streaming
Japan (RIAJ)	2× Platinum	200,000,000^{†}
^{*} Sales figures based on certification alone.^{^} Shipments figures based on certification alone.^{†} Streaming-only figures based on certification alone.

Certifications for "Spirits of the Sea"
Region	Certification	Certified units/sales
Japan (RIAJ) Digital	Platinum	250,000^{*}
Streaming
Japan (RIAJ)	Gold	50,000,000^{†}
^{*} Sales figures based on certification alone.^{†} Streaming-only figures based on certification alone.
