= Kanden =

Kanden may refer to:

== Entertainment ==
=== Film ===
- Kanden Seethaiyai, the Tamil translation of the film 9 Nelalu
- Kanden Seethaiyai (unreleased film), a planned film remake of Ammayane Sathyam
- Kanden Kadhalai, a 2009 Indian Tamil romantic comedy film
- Kandaen, another Indian Tamil romantic comedy film released in 2011

=== Music ===
- "Kanden", a song from Stray Sheep

=== Video games ===
- Kanden, a fictional bounty hunter in Metroid Prime Hunters

== Transportation ==
- Kanden Tunnel Electric Bus, a bus line that forms part of the Tateyama Kurobe Alpine Route in Japan
