= Hype =

Hype (derived from hyperbole) is promotion, especially promotion consisting of exaggerated claims.

Hype or The Hype may also refer to:

== Film and television ==
- Hype (TV series), an American comedy television series
- The Hype (2015 TV series), an Australian television series
- The Hype (2021 TV series), an American reality television series
- Hype!, a documentary about the popularity of grunge rock in the early to mid 1990s

== Music ==
- The Hype (band), fronted by David Bowie
- "The Hype", an early name of the Irish rock band U2
- DJ Hype, British drum and bass DJ
- Hype Williams (born 1970), music video director
- Hype (album), 1981 album by Robert Calvert
- Hype! (soundtrack), a 1996 soundtrack to the Hype! documentary
- "Hype" (song), a 2016 single by Dizzee Rascal and Calvin Harris
- "Hype", a 2016 song by Drake from the album Views
- "The Hype", a 2011 song by The New Cities from the album Kill the Lights
- "The Hype" (Shopping song), a 2017 song from the album The Official Body
- "The Hype" (Twenty One Pilots song), a 2019 song from the album Trench

== Other uses ==
- HYPE, a Polish nanosatellite
- Hype (magazine), a South African magazine
- Hype (marketing)
- Hype in science
- Hype: The Time Quest, a 1999 PC role-playing game by Playmobil
- Hype Energy, a brand of high-energy drinks
- Skywalk Hype, a German paraglider design
- Hype, a Fortnite dance based on the music video of "Shoot" by BlocBoy JB
