= Masataka Nakagauchi =

Japanese actor

- 中河内 雅貴
- Born: 23 August 1985 (age 39); Nishi-ku, Hiroshima, Japan
- Occupation(s): Dancer, actor
- Years active: 2002–
- Agent: Kaos Performance Office
- Known for: Tenimyu; Orpheus in the Underworld
- Height: 1.74 m (5 ft 9 in)
- Website: nakagauchi.com (in Japanese)

Masataka Nakagauchi (中河内 雅貴, Nakagauchi Masataka, born 23 August 1985) is a Japanese actor. He is represented by Kaos Performance Office.

== Discography ==
=== Singles ===
Year	Title
2008	"Start / Sun will shine away"
2008	"Your Story / Ano Sora e"
2008	"Nice To Talk On My Way Masataka Nakagauchi × Takehiro Furukawa"
2009	"Kimi wa Boku no Taiyō"
2009	"Hashiridasu Toki"

=== Albums ===
Year	Title
2007	Musical "The Prince of Tennis" Best Actor's Series 008
2008	Stand Up!
2009	Cheers!!
2010	Hi Jump
2010	Index
2015	10th Anniversary

=== Videos ===
Year	Title
2008	Masataka Nakagauchi 1st Live: Stand Up!
2009	Masataka Nakagauchi Live Tour: Cheers!!!
2011	Masataka Nakagauchi × Hajime Kikuchi: Bokutachi no Chikyū Road in Hawaii
2011	Masataka Nakagauchi Live Tour: Hi Jump
2012	Making of "Spinning Box" 34 Days
2012	Masataka Nakagauchi × Toru Baba: Bokutachi no Chikyū Road in Italia
2013	Masataka Nakagauchi × Matsugi Yoshitomo: Bokutachi no Chikyū Road in USA Nishikaigan

== Filmography ==
=== Stage ===
Year	Title	Role
2006	Happa no Freddy: Inochi no Tabi	Mark
2006	Tenimyu	Masaharu Niou
2008	Samurai 7	Kyuzo
2008	Yume o Kanaeru Zō	Shunsuke
2009	Cyrano de Bergerac	Christian
2010	Tumbling	Akira Doi
2011	Legend of the Galactic Heroes	Wolfgang Mittermeier
2012	Orpheus in the Underworld	Val Savior
2013	Takarazuka Boys	Joji Hoshino
2013	Musical Kuroshitsuji: The Most Beautiful DEATH in the World Re-Run	Alan Humphries
2014	Rainbow Prelude	Josef
2016	Jersey Boys	Tommy DeVito
2023-2024	Moulin Rouge	Santiago

=== Live shows ===
Year	Title
2007	Masataka Nakagauchi 1st Live: Stand Up!!!
2009	Pati Night Episode 03
2009	Masataka Nakagauchi Live Tour: Cheers!!!
2009	Kaos Presents: The Show Case vol. 1 7 Boys sing Standard songs
2009	Kaos Presents: The Show Case vol. 2 –Boys Rock your heart–
2010	Masataka Nakagauchi Live Tour: Hi Jump
2011	15th Anniversary MMV Live
2013	Masataka Nakagauchi Acoustic Live Tour 2013: Song for you
2015	Hisashiburi ni Yaru ze!! Anniversary Live

=== Events ===
Year	Title
2010	Tokyo Kaikan Musical Salon Vol. 25: Yoshihisa Higashiyama & Masataka Nakagauchi
2011	Live Performance Show: Spinning Box
2012	Tokyo Kaikan Sōgyō 90-shūnenkinen Musical Salon: Yoshihisa Higashiyama & Masataka Nakagauchi
2014	Spinning Channel
2014	Theatrical Concert: Vinyl Donuts
2014	Spinning Channel DVD Hatsubai Kinen Event

=== TV drama ===
Year	Title	Role	Network	Notes
2007	Biyō Shōnen Celebrity	Ryo	TV Tokyo	
2008	Wild Strawberry	Hayato	TV Asa Channel	
2010	Tumbling	Machida	TBS	Episodes 8 and 9
2010	Masataka Nakagauchi Skotai no Yakudō	Hiroki	ABC	
2011	Crystal	Taichi Utsumi	CTV	
2012	Fallen Angel	Kondo	BS Asahi	
2015	Omotesan-dō Kōkō Gassyo-bu	Shuji Koyamada	TBS	Episodes 2 and 4

=== TV series ===
Year	Title	Network
2008	Akashiya San Channel	TBS
2009	Sweet Den of Premiere	Fuji TV
2009	Down Town DX	YTV
2012	Fallen Angel Dai 1-wa Hōsō Chokuzen Special Intermission: Ōiri Enta TV	BS Asahi

=== Films ===
Year	Title	Role	Notes	Ref.
2009	Kirakira Movies: 2 Steps!	Hayato Ikagura	Lead role	
2012	Shi ga Futari Wowakatsumade	Kuroki		
2012	The Boy Inside	Jun		
2013	Arcana	Kensho Murakami		
2021	The Grapes of Joy			

=== Photobooks ===
Year	Title
2007	Men's Photo book: Half moon
2009	Zodiac
2009	Mega crescendo
2016	30 Stones
