= Memeshikute =

2009 single by Golden Bomber

"Memeshikute" (女々しくて, It's feminine) is the fourth single of Golden Bomber and released on October 21, 2009. It also released as a double A-side single as "Memeshikute/Nemutakute" (女々しくて/眠たくて) on August 24, 2011.

== Abstract ==
The song was used as advertisement song of Softband Mobile, collaborated with Atsuko Maeda.

It had performed 5 times in Kōhaku Uta Gassen.

It broke the record of consecutive weekly No.2 on Oricon Karaoke Chart by AKB48.

== Track listing ==
Memeshikute

1. 'Memeshikute'
2. 'Cool English'
3. 'While you are not'
4. 'Wonderful (Original Karaoke)'
5. 'Cool English (Original Karaoke)'
6. 'In the absence of you (original karaoke)'

Memeshikute/Nemutakute

1. 'It's feminine' [4:09]
2. 'I want to sleep' [3:55]
3. 'Femdom -Korean version-' [4:09]
4. 'I can't sleep tonight (in a pathological sense)' [3:38]
5. Feminine (original karaoke) [4:09]
6. I want to sleep (original karaoke) [3:55]
7. Feminine -Korean POP Version- (Original Karaoke) [4:09]
8. Can't sleep tonight (in a pathological sense) (original karaoke) [3:38]

== Chart ==
Oricon

Single	Peak position
Memeshikute	4
Memeshikute/Nemutakute	4
