= Hype in science =

In science communication and academic publishing, hype in science is the exaggeration and sensationalism of scientific discoveries when submitting discoveries to scientific journals and when publicizing results in the news media.

Hype in science has been seen to come as a result of scientists working in an increasingly competitive field where the discoveries published by an individual have large ramifications on that individual’s income and career path. In order to make their work stand out, many scientists will exaggerate their findings and embezzle their writing with affirmative terms. Many studies have been completed that show how the frequency of terms that may be used to affirm or exaggerate findings has increased in recent decades as academia and the competitiveness of science journals increases as well.

Scientific journals engage in hype in science as well as the scientists. Journals are more likely to publish articles which use more exciting and positive language. These articles are what get the non-scientific general public interested, and therefore are contenders for press releases and articles in mainstream news outlets.

== Sources of hype ==
Hype in science occurs at every level of scientific publication. The objectives at each level are mostly the same, but the methods and audience differ.

=== Scientists ===
To gain a competitive advantage against their peers, it has become common practice for scientists to exaggerate their findings, or more commonly, the ramifications of their findings. It is becoming increasingly difficult for scientists to have their work published in journals, which provides the motivation for exaggerating their findings.

=== Journals ===
Along with scientists, scientific journals operate in a competitive environment. Journals are more likely to select articles which present more innovative and groundbreaking discoveries, even if those discoveries are often exaggerated to the point of falsification.

=== Mainstream news ===
Mainstream news media will often utilize attention-grabbing headlines, including new scientific findings, as a way to gain viewership from the general public. This leads to the sensationalism of science to the public, as well as an eventual distrust in the scientific community as the realization occurs that many scientific discoveries are exaggerated.

== Effects ==
Hype in science is problematic for a number of reasons. First off, any false reporting of science can lead to a misinformed public that is free to make decisions based on falsified findings and fake science. Additionally, the public becomes gradually less trusting of scientific publications as more articles are published which are not accurate about their findings and are perceived to pull on the attention of readers without actually delivering on the benefits. This alienates the reader, and thus, the general public, from the scientific community as a whole.
