= Huwie Ishizaki =

Japanese singer-songwriter (born 1984)

Huwie Ishizaki 石崎ひゅーい
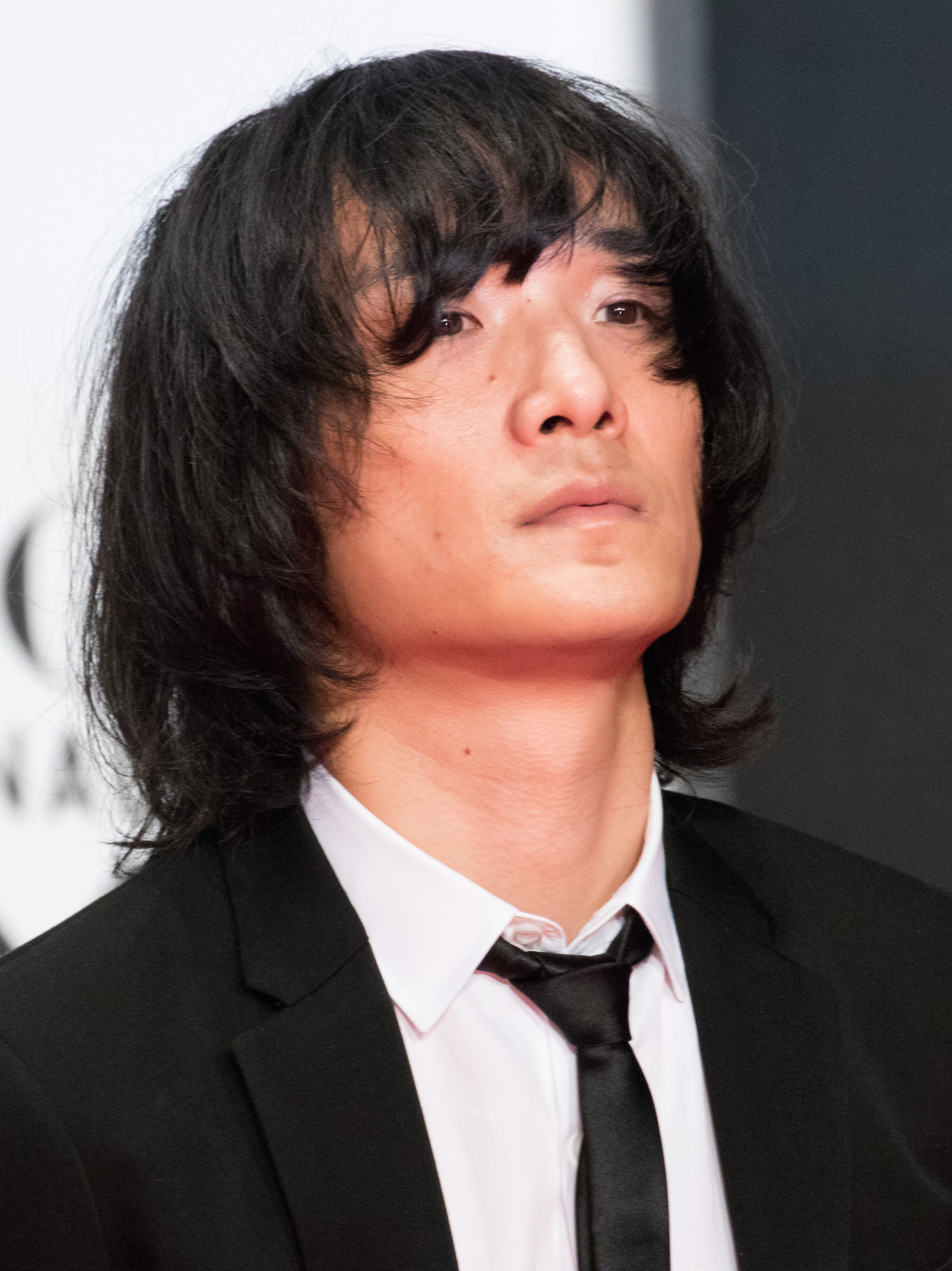
- Ishizaki at the 29th Tokyo International Film Festival in 2016

Background information
- Born: March 7, 1984 (age 42); Mito, Ibaraki, Japan
- Genre: J-Pop
- Occupations: Singer-songwriter; actor
- Years active: 2004–present
- Formerly of: Astrocoast
- Website: ishizakihuwie.com

Huwie Ishizaki (Japanese: 石崎ひゅーい, Hepburn: Ishizaki Hyūi; born March 7, 1984) is a Japanese singer-songwriter and actor. Born and raised in Mito, Ibaraki, he began writing and performing when he was in middle school and later became the vocalist of the band Astrocoast. In 2012, at the age of 26, he became a solo artist after being persuaded to by the music producer Akira Sudo; he debuted in July 2012 with his mini album Dai-san Wakusei Kōkyōkyoku. As of March 2026, he has released six full albums. He charted on Billboard Japan's Hot Lyricist and Composer in November 2021.

Ishizaki has made various film and television appearances, beginning with his debut role in 2016 film Japanese Girls Never Die as Yuji Soga. He appeared as Takashi Nozoe in the 2019 film Sora no Restaurant, and as Kamiya Yusuke in the TV drama series Hidarikiki no Eren.

He has written songs for other artists such as Masaki Suda and Aina the End; he also performed theme songs for Japanese film and TV dramas such as "Yakan Hikō", which was used as the ending theme for 2013 TV drama series Minna! ESPer Dayo!. He performed "Parade" which served as the secondary ending theme of the 2019 anime Case File nº221: Kabukicho.

== Early life ==
Ishizaki was born on March 7, 1984, in Mito, Ibaraki. His name was derived from the middle name of David Bowie's son, Duncan Zowie Jones, as his mother was a fan of Bowie's. Ishizaki said in an interview with Music Natalie that he was often asked with disbelief to "write his real name", even though Huwie was his real name. During his childhood, his mother takes him to Tokyo to see concerts and tours, he said that this is where his desire for expression began to sprout.

== Early career ==
In Ishizaki's first year of middle school, he decided to start his music career. He has said that he particularly liked Speed and that he was a member of a Speed fan club. A friend of his joined a band that covered Hi-Standard's songs, and he joined the band as a vocalist. He also wrote songs and performed live in local live houses in Mito, Ibaraki. At this time he also joined a children's theater group because his mother wanted him to become an actor.

Ishizaki was part of the Hi-Standard cover band until he was in his first year of college in Tokyo, when he left the band because he was tired of singing English lyrics without understanding them. He moved to Tokyo when he was 18. Alongside working as a band, he was also working in a part-time job. Ishizaki founded the rock band Astrocoast in 2004, which focused on singing Japanese songs. One of the first songs that he wrote was "History of Gandhi", which is about Mahatma Gandhi.

Ishizaki was a member of Astrocoast for two years, but left as their songs' sales remained stagnant. Later, he met Akira Sudo, a music producer in a live venue in Yokohama where Astrocoast often performed. Sudo persuaded him to become a solo artist, which he did when he was 26. Astrocoast disbanded in November 2010.

== Solo artist ==
=== 2010s ===
Ishizaki's debut as a solo artist came on July 25, 2012, with the mini album Dai-san Wakusei Kōkyōkyoku. It followed his appearance in a live show by Rake that year. The album's songs were based on his feelings about real life events such as the 2011 Great East Japan earthquake, Some of the songs were personal, such as one about his mother's death four years prior. After his father told him that his mother would not have liked melancholy songs, he rewrote it. He released his first single "Fantastic Radio" on November 21. He was selected as one of the "12 Artists to Watch" for 2012 by iTunes Japan.

Ishizaki released a single, "Yakan Hikō", on June 5, 2013, which served as the ending theme song for the Japanese drama series Minna! ESPer Dayo!, the first episode of which featured a cameo from him. He released his first full album, Dokuritsu Zen'ya, on July 17, the one-year anniversary of his debut. The album's title (lit. "Eve of Independence") is a reference to his decision to become a solo artist. On November 27, he released another single, "Mayday, Mayday", which was used as the theme song for the 2013 Judo Grand Slam Tokyo.

On April 2, 2014, he released his second mini album, Dakara Carnation wa Sukidenai, which was about his feelings for his mother. On June 25, he released the double-sided single "Peanut Butter/Nakimushi Hacchi". "Peanut Butter" was used as the ending theme for the Japanese film Shin Kaishaku/Nipponshi. He released the song "Hoshi o Tsukamaete", which was used as the ending theme of Haikyū!! Riēfu Kenzan! (a spin-off film of the anime Haikyu!!).

On February 26, 2015, he published his first novel, Sayonara, Tōkyō Merīgōrando. In March of that year he released the song "Boku ga Iruso!", which was used as the ending theme of a Minna! ESPer Dayo! spin-off. He made his stage debut in June, in the play Kanojo no Kigen by the Gekidan Shikagoroshi Theater Company. On September 4, he released the song "Otamajakushi", which served as the opening theme of the Minna! ESPer Dayo! film.

Ishizaki released his second full album, Kabin no Hana, on May 18, 2016; a short film with the same title had been released four days prior. He starred as Yuji Soga in the 2016 film Japanese Girls Never Die. On August 27, he released his single "Pino to Amélie", which served as the second ending theme of the 21st season of the anime Naruto: Shippuden. On December 7, he released his third album Atarazumotookarazu, produced by Akira Sudo.

In 2017, he wrote the song "Sayonara Elergy" which was performed by Masaki Suda. On March 28, 2018, he released Huwie's Best, a compilation album of his fans' favorite songs—selected through online voting. In December 2018, he performed "Encore", which served as the theme song for the 2018 drama series Heisei Bashiru—in which he had a cameo. He also performed "Anata wa Doko ni Iruno", the theme song of the 2019 drama series Sasurai Onsen Endō Ken'ichi—in which he also had a cameo, as a Kokeshi doll craftsman.

In January 2019, he starred as Takashi Nozoe in the film Sora no Restaurant. In February, he wrote and directed J-Wave's 30th anniversary musical performance. In March 6, he released another mini-album, Golden Age. In June, he performed both the theme song "Namida" and the ending theme song "Ano Natsu no Hi no Mahō" of the anime film For Whom The Alchemist Exists: The Movie. He wrote another song for Masaki Suda, entitled "Clover", which served as the theme song of a short film of the same name. He had his first non-cameo acting role in the TV drama series Hidarikiki no Eren as Kamiya Yusuke.

=== 2020s ===
In 2020, Ishizaki performed the second ending theme of the anime Case File nº221: Kabukicho, entitled "Parade", with lyrics about his own loneliness. He performed the ending theme song of the film Tread—in which he also made an appearance. He performed "Flowers", which served as the theme song of the film Underdog. He wrote the song "Niji" (sung by Masaki Suda), which served as the theme song of the anime film Stand by Me Doraemon 2.

In 2021, Ishizaki performed the theme song "Ayame" of the 5th season of the TV drama series Keishichō – Sōsaikkachō; he also had a cameo in the 8th episode of that season. In February of that year, he performed a cover of "Sayonara Elergy", a song he originally wrote for Masaki Suda on The First Take YouTube channel. He wrote the debut song of Ninety-nine's Hiroyuki Yabe. He performed "Black Star", which served as the theme song of the film Watashi wa Hakuchō. He wrote the song "Last Scene", performed by Masaki Suda, which served as the theme song of the TV drama series Japan Sinks: People of Hope. He charted three times on both Billboard Japan's Hot Composer and Hot Lyricist charts, peaking at 14 and 15 respectively on November 17, 2021. On December 21 he released his fourth full album Diamond.

In 2022, Ishizaki performed "Hanataba" as the theme song of the 6th season of Keishichō – Sōsaikkachō—in which he also made a cameo. The song was based on a true story about how Ishizaki's friend met his wife. He collaborated with Masaki Suda on a song entitled "Aimokawarazu". He acted in the TV drama series Japanese Style as Ringorou Asatsuki. In 2023, he performed "Wasuregataki", which served as the opening theme of the anime Dr. Stone: New World. He wrote the song "Ai Kotoba"—performed by Aina the End—as the ending theme of the anime series The Apothecary Diaries. He also released his fifth album—New Cosmos—on July 26, 2023, in celebration of his 10th year as a solo artist.

On September 11, 2024, Ishizaki released a single, "Season2", which was produced by Yaffle. On November 27, he released his first cover album, "night milk", featuring covers of songs by Fujii Kaze, Mrs. Green Apple, and others. He appeared in the live-action movie of Ya Boy Kongming! as Higashiyama. In 2025, he performed “HERO”, the theme song of the TV drama series Itsuka, Hero. On March 18, 2026, he released his sixth full album Tokyo City Lights.

== Artistry ==
Ishizaki said in an interview with Music Natalie that he writes songs to express the 'emotion that builds up' about his daily life, and he believes that songs that 'come out' that way are more human that the ones that are 'created'. He also said that most of his songs were greatly influenced by his late mother. Aina the End describes Ishizaki as someone who writes songs in a 'straightforward' manner. Billboard Japan describes him as "a cutting-edge singer-songwriter with a presence like that of a 'singing monster'". Guitarist Marty Friedman commented in Nikkei Business Publications that Ishizaki's vocals are "his own style, but very emotional" and added that his vocals are "absolutely impossible to auto tune." Hirokazu Suzuki of RealSound said that the "core" of his expression is "real", adding that he writes "beautiful songs", but does not sing "pretty words".

== Personal life ==
Ishizaki describes himself as "a sloppy person who does not understand other people's feelings, but deeply aware that he lives his life with the support of others". Ishizaki has stated that he is "bit of an alcoholic". He said that his earning during his time with a band was spent on alcohol and pachinko. He also said that he almost died twice in about a month when he was in college due to acute alcohol poisoning and after that he began slowly reducing his alcohol intake. He often mentions that he likes to be naked, and said in an interview that "if it were allowed, I'd like to be naked forever."

== Discography ==
=== Albums ===
==== Mini-albums ====
Album title	Release date	Peak Ranking
Album title	Release date	JPN Hot
Dai-san Wakusei Kōkyōkyoku	July 25, 2012	—
Dakara Carnation wa Sukidenai	April 2, 2014	—
Golden Age	March 6, 2019	72

==== Full albums ====
Album title	Release date	Peak Ranking
Album title	Release date	JPN Hot
Dokuritsu Zen'ya	July 17, 2013	—
Kabin no Hana	May 18, 2016	58
Atarazumotookarazu	December 7, 2016	96
Diamond	December 21, 2021	65
New Cosmos	July 26, 2023	27
Tokyo City Lights	March 11, 2026	—

==== Compilation album ====
Album title	Release date	Peak Ranking
Album title	Release date	JPN Hot
Huwie's Best	March 28, 2018	90

==== Cover album ====
Album title	Release date	Peak Ranking
Album title	Release date	JPN Hot
night milk	November 27, 2024	95

=== Singles ===
Single	Release date	Peak Ranking	Album
Single	Release date	JPN Hot	Album
"Fantasic Radio"	November 21, 2012	31	Non-album single
"Yakan Hikō"	June 5, 2013	30	Dokuritsu Zen'ya
"Mayday, Mayday"	November 27, 2013	—	Kabin no Hana
"Peanuts Butter / Nakimushi Hacchi"	June 25, 2014	72 (Note: The chart only listed "Peanut Butter")	Kabin no Hana
"Hoshi o Tsukamaete"	March 4, 2015	—	Kabin no Hana
"Boku ga Iruso!"	March 25, 2015	—	Kabin no Hana
"Otamajakushi"	September 4, 2015	—	Kabin no Hana
"Pino to Amélie"	August 27, 2016	—	Atarazumotookarazu
"Namida / Ano Natsu no Hi no Mahō"	June 12, 2019	—	Diamond
"Parade"	March 11, 2020	—	Diamond
"Flowers"	November 24, 2020	—	Diamond
"Ayame"	May 17, 2021	—	Diamond
"Black Star"	July 7, 2021	—	Diamond
"Hanataba"	May 19, 2022	—	New Cosmos
"Aimokawarazu"	August 2, 2022	—	New Cosmos
"Wasuregataki"	May 24, 2023	—	New Cosmos
"Season2"	September 11, 2024	—	Tokyo City Lights
"Sunny Days"	November 13, 2024	—	Tokyo City Lights

== Filmography ==
=== Films ===
Year	Film	Role	Ref
2016	Japanese Girls Never Die	Yuji Soga	
2019	Sora no Restaurant	Takashi Nozoe	
2020	Thread		
2025	Ya Boy Kongming!	Higashiyama	
2026	The Hikikomori Extraction	Daisuke Wakabayashi	

=== Television ===
Year	Title	Role	Notes	Ref
2013	Minna! ESPer Dayo!		Cameo (EP1)	
2018	Heisei Bashiru		Cameo	
2019	Sasurai Onsen Endō Ken'ichi	Kokeshi doll craftsman		
2019	Hidarikiki no Eren	Kamiya Yusuke		
2021	Keishichō – Sōsaikkachō Season 5		Cameo (EP8)	
2022	Keishichō – Sōsaikkachō Season 6		Cameo	
2022	Japanese Style	Ringorou Asatsuki		
2023	Ya Boy Kongming!	Higashiyama	Episode 9	
2025	Jaa, Anta ga Tsukutte Miro yo	Ryō	Cameo (EP5)	
2026	Ano-chan no Dendendenpa		Cameo	

=== Stage play ===
- Kanojo no Kigen (2015)

== Concerts and tours ==
- Huwei Ishizaki TOUR 2013 Nationwide! Huwie Expo (2013)
- Huwei Ishizaki Acoustic Solo Tour 2018 'Period' (2018)
- Huwie Tour 2021 “for the BLACKSTAR” Acoustic Set- (2021)
- Huwie Ishizaki 10th anniversary TOUR (2022)
- Huwie Ishizaki TOUR 2025-2026 Season2 -Acoustic Set- (2025–2026)
