= Love (Masaki Suda album) =

Studio album by Masaki Suda
- Released: July 10, 2019
- Length: 46:00
- Language: Japanese
- Label: Epic Japan

Masaki Suda chronology
| Play (2018) | Love (2019) | Collage (2022) |

Love is the second album by Masaki Suda. It debuted at number three on the Oricon Albums Chart and was released on July 10, 2019.

== Track listing ==
| No. | Title | Music | Length |
|---|---|---|---|
| 1. | "Machigaisagashi" (まちがいさがし) | Kenshi Yonezu |
| 2. | "Clover" (クローバー) |
| 3. | "Long Hope Philia" (ロングホープ・フィリア) | Hiromu Akita (Amazarashi) |
| 4. | "7.1oz" | Masaki Suda |
| 5. | "Dras" (ドラス) |
| 6. | "Tsumoru Hanashi" (つもる話) |
| 7. | "Kiss Dakede" (キスだけで) | Aimyon |
| 8. | "Living Dead" (りびんぐでっど) |
| 9. | "TONE BENDER LOVE" | Masaki Suda |
| 10. | "Aitsu to Sono Ko" (あいつとその子) | Masaki Suda |
| 11. | "Baby" (ベイビィ) | Masaki Suda |

== Charts ==
=== Album ===
| Chart (2019) | Peak position |
|---|---|
| Japanese Albums (Oricon) | 3 |

=== Singles ===
"Machigai Sagashi"

| Chart (2019) | Peak position |
|---|---|
| Japan (Billboard Japan Hot 100) | 2 |

== Awards ==
| Year | Ceremony | Award | Nominated work | Result |
|---|---|---|---|---|
| 2019 | MTV VMAJ 2019 | Best Pop Video | Machigai Sagashi | Won |
| 2019 | 101st Television Drama Academy Awards | Best Theme Song | Machigai Sagashi | Won |
