= Flamingo/Teenage Riot =

2018 single by Kenshi Yonezu

Single by Kenshi Yonezu

from the album Stray Sheep
- Language: Japanese
- B-side: "Gomenne"
- Released: October 31, 2018
- Studio: ABS Recording and Studio Greenbird, Tokyo
- Genre: J-pop
- Length: 10:32
- Label: Sony Music Records; Mastersix Foundation
- Songwriter: Kenshi Yonezu
- Producer: Kenshi Yonezu

Kenshi Yonezu singles chronology
| "Lemon" (2018) | "Flamingo/Teenage Riot" (2018) | "Spirits of the Sea" (2019) |

Music videos
- "Flamingo" on YouTube
- "Teenage Riot" on YouTube

"Flamingo" and "Teenage Riot" (stylized in all caps) are songs by Japanese singer-songwriter Kenshi Yonezu. They were released together as a double A-side single on October 31, 2018.

== Background and release ==
On September 7, 2018, it was announced that "Flamingo" and "Teenage Riot" would be released as a double A-side single, along with a B-side, "Gomenne". It was then released physically and digitally on October 31 in three editions: a standard edition featuring cover artwork of a flamingo illustration, a "Flamingo" edition with the same cover, a DVD containing a special video for the title track, and a smartphone grip ring, and a "Teenage Riot" edition including different artwork and five eight-sided dice. All artwork was illustrated by Yonezu himself. All first-press versions of the single regardless of edition included a serial number for a lottery in winning tickets to Yonezu's 2019 When the Spine Becomes Opal Tour.

== Composition and lyrics ==
=== "Flamingo" ===
"Flamingo" was originally conceived without a clear concept in mind. Yonezu wanted to have an exotic and folklore feel to it, ultimately connecting to Japanese folk music akin to shima-uta and dodoitsu. Multiple voice clips are present throughout the song, including trembling lips, purring, clearing throats, and talking. Initially, Yonezu created up to the first chorus with only bass, a kick drum, and snare, but felt that the addition of voice clips made the song complete. He then expanded on its sound by utilizing a different singing style.

Yonezu thought to express feelings of "indecency" and "embarrassment" into one song during the writing process, which he felt were allowed to blossom as its sole writer. He was influenced by recalling drunken moments, admitting he would "act like a clown" and cosplay as a hedonist. They also served as inspiration for the voice clips, representing various noises Yonezu would make and hear during those experiences.

=== "Teenage Riot" ===
"Teenage Riot" was based on a song that Yonezu wrote and posted to Niconico while in junior high school. It was originally intended as a musically-contrasting B-side to "Lemon" before his staff convinced him to save it for a title track release. Stemming from his own personal adolescence, he wrote the song meant to cherish venting out the "impulsive" and "crude" feelings one may hold. He felt those kinds of feelings were often associated with the terms "eighth-grader syndrome" and "menhera" by the general public.

=== "Gomenne" ===
"Gomenne" was created after Yonezu played the role-playing video game Undertale, and intended the track as an unofficial theme song for the game. Originally, he thought of the song being released with "Flamingo" and "Teenage Riot" as a triple A-side single, which caused some trouble with his staff.

== Music videos ==
=== "Flamingo" ===
The music video for "Flamingo" was directed by Tomokazu Yamada, who also directed the music video for "Lemon". It was filmed in an underground parking lot beneath the Tokyo Expressway in Ginza and inside a Chinese restaurant. It features Yonezu walking around the parking lot and restaurant as he dances at various points. Japanese dancer Aoi Yamada also appears in the video.

The video was first unveiled in its entirety on October 20, 2018, as part of the #Scramble collaborative project between Shibuya Ward and Sony. It premiered as a surprise showing on a live showcase stage in front of the Statue of Hachikō specifically constructed for the project, as well as on a large screen overlooking Shibuya Crossing. Simultaneously, the event was streamed on the Japanese video live-streaming service Line Live. It was then uploaded to Yonezu's YouTube channel shortly after the event.

=== "Teenage Riot" ===
The music video for "Teenage Riot" was directed by Kyōtarō Hayashi. It was filmed entirely in monochrome and features Yonezu and his live backing musicians, Hiroshi Nakajima, Yū Sutō, and Masaki Hori, performing inside a gymnasium. The video premiered during Yonezu's 2018 Live/Flamingo concert held at Makuhari Messe on October 27 and 28, 2018, and was later uploaded to YouTube.

== Usage in media ==
=== "Flamingo" ===
"Flamingo" was used as the theme song of a commercial for Sony's WF-SP900 wireless earphones. It features Yonezu dancing while listening to the song and marked his first official appearance in a commercial.

=== "Teenage Riot" ===
"Teenage Riot" was used as the theme song of a Mandom Gatsby commercial, starring actors Yuya Yagira and Mackenyu.

== Track listing ==
- CD, digital download, and streaming
1. "Flamingo" – 3:15
2. "Teenage Riot" – 3:45
3. "Gomenne" (ごめんね) – 3:32
- DVD – "Flamingo" edition
1. "Flamingo" (special video) – 1:16

== Credits and personnel ==
Credits adapted from the liner notes.

- Kenshi Yonezu – producer, arranger, vocals, songwriter, guitar (tracks 1-2)
- Yū Sutō – bass (track 1)
- Miyake Akira – vocal director (track 1)
- Masahito Komori – recording engineer (tracks 1, 3), mixing engineer (tracks 1-3)
- Tatsuya Mochizuki – guitar technician (track 1)
- Hidekazu Hinata / Hinatch – bass (track 2)
- Tom Tamada – drums (track 2)
- Yōhei Makabe – guitar (track 2)
- Shōichirō Ishī – recording engineer (track 2)
- Atsushi Tomita – bass technician (track 2)
- Ted Jensen – mastering engineer (tracks 1-3)

== Charts ==
=== Weekly charts ===
Weekly chart performance for "Flamingo"
| Chart (2018-2019) | Peak position |
|---|---|
| Japan (Japan Hot 100) | 1 |
| Japan (Oricon) with "Teenage Riot" | 1 |
| Japan Combined Singles (Oricon) with "Teenage Riot" | 4 |

Weekly chart performance for "Teenage Riot"
| Chart (2018) | Peak position |
|---|---|
| Japan (Japan Hot 100) | 4 |
| Japan (Oricon) with "Flamingo" | 1 |
| Japan Combined Singles (Oricon) with "Flamingo" | 4 |

Weekly chart performance for "Gomenne"
| Chart (2018) | Peak position |
|---|---|
| Japan (Japan Hot 100) | 12 |

=== Year-end charts ===
Year-end chart performance for "Flamingo"
| Chart (2018) | Position |
|---|---|
| Japan (Japan Hot 100) | 20 |
| Japan (Oricon) with "Teenage Riot" | 28 |

| Chart (2019) | Position |
|---|---|
| Japan (Japan Hot 100) | 12 |

== Certifications ==
Certifications for "Flamingo"
| Region | Certification | Certified units/sales |
|---|---|---|
| Japan (RIAJ) Physical with "Teenage Riot" | Platinum | 250,000^{^} |
| Japan (RIAJ) Digital | 2× Platinum | 500,000^{*} |
Streaming
| Japan (RIAJ) | Platinum | 100,000,000^{†} |
^{*} Sales figures based on certification alone.^{^} Shipments figures based on certification alone.^{†} Streaming-only figures based on certification alone.

Certifications for "Teenage Riot"
| Region | Certification | Certified units/sales |
|---|---|---|
| Japan (RIAJ) Physical with "Flamingo" | Platinum | 250,000^{^} |
| Japan (RIAJ) Digital | Gold | 100,000^{*} |
^{*} Sales figures based on certification alone.^{^} Shipments figures based on certification alone.
