= Masaki Suda =

Japanese actor and singer (born 1993)

- 菅田 将暉
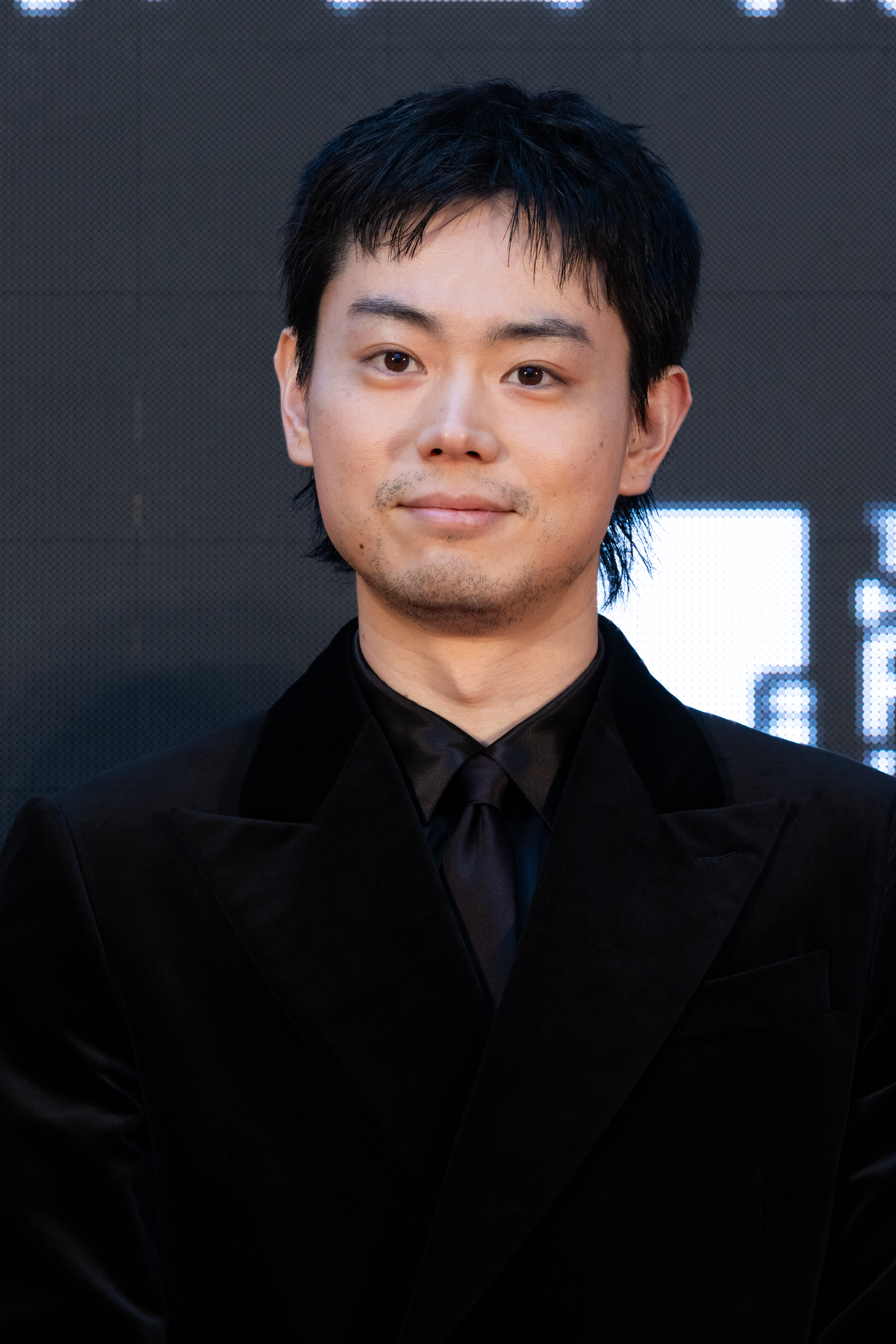
- Suda at the 37th Tokyo International Film Festival in 2024
- Born: Taishō Sugō (菅生 大将); February 21, 1993 (age 33); Minoh, Osaka Prefecture, Japan
- Occupations: Actor; singer
- Years active: 2009–present
- Agent: Top Coat
- Spouse: Nana Komatsu (m. 2021)
- Children: 1
- Relatives: Kento Sugō (brother); Araki Sugō (brother)
- Musical career
- Genres: Pop; rock
- Years active: 2017–present
- Label: Epic Records Japan
- Website: sudamasaki-music.com

Taishō Sugō (菅生 大将, Sugō Taishō; born February 21, 1993), known professionally as Masaki Suda (菅田 将暉, Suda Masaki), is a Japanese actor and singer. He won the Japan Academy Film Prize for Outstanding Performance by an Actor in a Leading Role for the film Wilderness.

== Early life ==
Suda was born in Minoh, Osaka Prefecture. His father, Arata Sugō, is a management consultant, journalist, author, and television personality. He has two younger brothers: the singer and internet personality Kocchi no Kento, and model Araki Sugō.

== Career ==
=== Acting ===
Suda met talent agents while at school. He had several auditions at Amuse Inc. and Junon Superboy Contest. He starred in the tokusatsu series Kamen Rider W. He won the Best New Actor Award at Tama Cinema Forum and the Japan Academy Film Prize for Outstanding Performance by an Actor in a Leading Role in Wilderness. Suda starred in the live-action film adaptation of Robico's manga series My Little Monster. He starred in Hayao Miyazaki's anime film The Boy and the Heron.

=== Music ===
Suda starred in the biopic film about Hide of the group Greeeen. They released an EP, Green Boys. He released the albums, Play and Love.

== Personal life ==
Suda married actress Nana Komatsu on November 15, 2021. They have starred together in the films, Drowning Love and Threads: Our Tapestry of Love. On March 9, 2024, Suda announced through his agency that he and Komatsu had welcomed their first child.

== Filmography ==
=== Film ===
Year	Title	Role	Notes	Ref.
2009	Kamen Rider Decade: All Riders vs. Dai-Shocker	Philip / Kamen Rider W (voice)	Cameo	
2009	Kamen Rider × Kamen Rider W & Decade: Movie War 2010	Philip / Kamen Rider W	Lead role	
2010	Kamen Rider W Forever: A to Z/The Gaia Memories of Fate	Philip / Kamen Rider W / Katsumi Daido (boyhood)	Lead role	
2010	Kamen Rider × Kamen Rider OOO & W Featuring Skull: Movie War Core	Philip / Kamen Rider W	Lead role	
2011	OOO, Den-O, All Riders: Let's Go Kamen Riders	Philip / Kamen Rider W	Cameo	
2011	Kamen Rider W Returns	Philip / Kamen Rider W, Katsumi Daido (boyhood)	Cameo	
2011	High School Debut	Fumiya Tamura		
2011	Kamen Rider × Kamen Rider Fourze & OOO: Movie War Mega Max	Philip / Kamen Rider W	Cameo	
2012	The Wings of the Kirin	Tomoyuki Yoshinaga		
2012	The Boy Inside	Morio	Lead role	
2013	The Backwater	Toma Shinogaki	Lead role	
2013	Girl in the Sunny Place	Shota Okuda		
2013	Daily Lives of High School Boys	Tadakuni	Lead role	
2014	The Light Shines Only There	Takuji Oshiro		
2014	Ushijima the Loan Shark Part 2	Masaru Kaga		
2014	Princess Jellyfish	Kuranosuke Koibuchi		
2015	Assassination Classroom	Karma Akabane		
2015	Piece of Cake	Kawatani		
2016	Destruction Babies	Yuya Kitahara		
2016	Lost and Found	Yuya Kiyokawa		
2016	Pink and Gray	Daiki Kawata		
2016	Double Life	Takuya Suzuki		
2016	Assassination Classroom: Graduation	Karma Akabane		
2016	Seto and Utsumi	Seto	Lead role	
2016	Death Note: Light Up the New World	Yūki Shien	Lead role	
2016	Drowning Love	Kōichirō Hasegawa	Lead role	
2016	Someone	Kōtarō Kamiya		
2017	Kiseki: Sobito of That Day	Hide	Lead role	
2017	Wilderness	Shinji Sawamura	Lead role	
2017	Gintama	Shinpachi Shimura		
2017	Teiichi: Battle of Supreme High	Teiichi Akaba	Lead role	
2017	Fireworks	Norimichi Shimada (voice)	Lead role	
2017	Spark	Tokunaga	Lead role	
2018	My Little Monster	Haru Yoshida	Lead role	
2018	Love At Least	Tsunagi		
2018	Gintama 2	Shinpachi Shimura		
2019	The Great War of Archimedes	Major Tadashi Kai	Lead role	
2019	Taro the Fool	Eiji		
2020	Threads: Our Tapestry of Love	Ren Takahashi	Lead role	
2020	The Asadas	Yōsuke Ono		
2021	It's a Flickering Life	Young Gō	Lead role	
2021	We Made a Beautiful Bouquet	Mugi Yamane	Lead role	
2021	Character	Keigo Yamashiro	Lead role	
2021	Cube	Yuichi Goto	Lead role	
2022	A Hundred Flowers	Izumi Kasai	Lead role	
2023	Father of the Milky Way Railroad	Kenji Miyazawa		
2023	Don't Call It Mystery: The Movie	Totonō Kunō	Lead role	
2023	The Boy and the Heron	The Gray Heron (voice)		
2024	Love You as the World Ends: The Final	Ren Amagi	Special appearance	
2024	The Beast of Comedy	Pink		
2024	Cloud	Ryosuke Yoshii	Lead role	
2025	Sunset Sunrise	Shinsaku	Lead role	
2025	Meets the World	Toji Kugenuma (voice)	Cameo	
2026	One Last Love Letter	Katsushige Kawashima		
2026	The Samurai and the Prisoner	Kuroda Kanbei		
2026	New Theatrical Movie Keroro Gunsō	Shinpachi Shimura (voice)		
2026	Look Back	Maeda		
2027	Death Valley'95	Jiro	Lead role and director	

=== Television ===
Year	Title	Role	Notes	Ref.
2009–10	Kamen Rider W	Philip / Kamen Rider W	Lead role	
2010	Hammer Session!	Yōhei Sakamoto		
2010	Veterinarian Dolittle	Junpei Domon		
2011	You Taught Me All the Precious Things	Naoki Hiraoka		
2011	Don Quixote	Kazuya Akashi	Episode 5–10	
2011	Runaways: For Your Love	Shun Kagami		
2012	Man of Destiny		Episode 9	
2012	Summer Rescue	Kino Kentaro		
2012	Rich Man, Poor Woman	Takahiro Sakai		
2012	Blackboard ~ Jidai to Tatakatta Kyoushitachi~	Hideo Matsumura		
2012	Resident: Story of 5 Interns	Ryōji Hashimoto		
2013	Carry On! Hara-chan!	Hiroshi		
2013	No Dropping Out: Back to School at 35	Masamitsu Tsuchiya		
2013–14	Bon Appetit!	Taisuke Nishikado	Asadora	
2014	Shinigami-kun	Akuma		
2015	A Restaurant With Many Problems	Daichi Hoshino		
2015	Kageri Yuku Natsu	Shunji Mutō		
2015	I Want to Eat Nagasaki Champon Noodles	Masashi Sano	Lead role	
2015	Wise and Foolish	Shō Mutō	Lead role	
2016	Edogawa Ranpo Short Stories: "The Psychological Test"	Suspect	Short drama	
2016	Love Song	Soraichi Amano		
2016	Pretty Proofreader	Yukito Orihara		
2016	Uchuu no Shigoto	Mishima		
2016	The Brave Yoshihiko and The Seven Driven People	Thief A	Episode 1	
2017	Super Salaryman Mr. Saenai	Bus Jacker	Episode 10	
2017	Tales of the Unusual: Spring 2017: "Chameleon Actor"	Keita Kudō	Lead role; short drama	
2017	Naotora: The Lady Warlord	Ii Naomasa	Taiga drama	
2018	Kiss That Kills	Kazunori Harumi	Special appearance	
2018	Dele	Yūtarō Mashiba	Lead role	
2018–19	Manpuku	Taichi Azuma	Asadora	
2019	Mr. Hiiragi's Homeroom	Ibuki Hiiragi	Lead role	
2019	Perfect World	City officer	Episode 10	
2020	MIU404	Kuzumi		
2021	Life's Punchline	Haruto Takaiwa	Lead role	
2022	The 13 Lords of the Shogun	Minamoto no Yoshitsune	Taiga drama	
2022	Don't Call It Mystery	Totonō Kunō	Lead role	
2024	Parasyte: The Grey	Shinichi Izumi	Cameo	
2025	Glass Heart	Tōya Shinzaki		
2025	Queen of Mars	Aoto Shiraishi	Miniseries	
2025	Pray Speak What Has Happened	Mitsunari Kube	Lead role	
2026	Brothers in Arms	Takenaka Hanbei	Taiga drama	

=== Dubbing ===
Year	Title	Role	Dub for	Notes	Ref.
2019	Shazam!	Shazam	Zachary Levi		

== Discography ==
=== Studio albums ===
List of studio albums, showing selected details, chart positions, and certifications
Title	Details	Peak chart positions		Certifications
Title	Details	JPN	JPN Hot	Certifications
Play	Released: March 21, 2018; Label: Epic Japan; Formats: CD, digital download, streaming	2	3	
Love	Released: July 10, 2019; Label: Epic Japan; Formats: CD, digital download, streaming	3	3	RIAJ: Gold (phy.)
Collage	Released: March 9, 2022; Label: Epic Japan; Formats: CD, digital download, streaming	4	4	
Spin	Released: July 3, 2024; Label: Epic Japan; Formats: CD, digital download, streaming	7	5	

=== Extended plays ===
List of extended plays, showing selected details and chart positions
Title	Details	Peak chart positions
Title	Details	JPN
Green Boys	Released: January 24, 2017; Label: Epic Japan; Formats: CD, digital download, streaming	4
Sensation Circle	Released: January 14, 2026; Label: Epic Japan; Formats: CD, digital download, streaming	13

=== Singles ===
==== As lead artist ====
List of singles as lead artist, showing year released, selected chart positions, certifications, and album name
Title	Year	Peak chart positions		Certifications	Album
Title	Year	JPN	JPN Hot	Certifications	Album
"Kiseki"	2016	—	7		Green Boys
"Mita Koto mo Nai Keshiki" (見たこともない景色)	2017	5	3	RIAJ: Gold (dig.); Gold (st.)	Play
"Kokyu" (呼吸)	2017	10	13		Play
"Asakusa Kid" (浅草キッド) (with Kenta Kiritani)	2017	—	—		Play
"Sayonara Elegy" (さよならエレジー)	2018	12	3	RIAJ: 2× Platinum (dig.); 3× Platinum (st.)	Play
"Long Hope Philia" (ロングホープ・フィリア)	2018	12	11	RIAJ: Gold (dig.); Gold (st.)	Love
"Machigai Sagashi" (まちがいさがし)	2019	1	2	RIAJ: 3× Platinum (dig.); 3× Platinum (st.)	Love
"Kiss Dake de" (キスだけで) (featuring Aimyon)	2019	9	11		Love
"Santora" (サントラ) (with Creepy Nuts)	2020	—	—		To Us Former Prodigies
"Ito" (糸) (with Huwie Ishizaki)	2020	—	—		Collage
"Keep on Running" (with Okamoto's)	2020	—	—		Collage
"Thank You Kamisama" (サンキュー神様) (with Tomoya Nakamura)	2020	—	—		Collage
"Niji" (虹)	2020	2	2	RIAJ: Platinum (dig.); 3× Platinum (st.)	Collage
"Hoshi wo Aogu" (星を仰ぐ)	2021	3	15	RIAJ: Platinum (st.)	Collage
"Last Scene" (ラストシーン)	2021	13	30		Collage
"Madou Ito" (惑う糸)	2022	8	44		Collage
"Quiet Journey" (クワイエットジャーニー)	2022	13	30		Quiet Journey
"Aimokawarazu" (愛も変わらず) (with Huwie Ishizaki)		—	—		New Cosmo
"Utsukushii Ikimono" (美しい生き物)	2023	—	—		Spin
"Yours" (ユアーズ)	2023	35	—		Spin
"Rurou no Katashiro" (るろうの形代) (with Tokyo Ska Paradise Orchestra)	2023	—	—		Spin
"Kodamasuru" (谺する)	2024	43	—		Spin
"—" denotes releases that did not chart.

=== As featuring artist ===
List of singles as featuring artist, showing year released, selected chart positions, and album name
Title	Year	Peak chart positions	Album
Title	Year	JPN Hot	Album
"Utakata-Uta" (うたかた歌) (with Radwimps)	2021	50	Forever Daze
"Chill Chill Michelle" (with Strange Reitaro)	2023	—	Strange Reitaro
"—" denotes releases that did not chart.

=== Promotional singles ===
List of promotional singles, showing year released, select chart positions, certifications, and album name
Title	Year	Peak chart positions	Certifications	Album
Title	Year	JPN Hot	Certifications	Album
"Haiiro to Ao" (灰色と青) (with Kenshi Yonezu)	2017	3	RIAJ: 2× Platinum (dig.); Platinum (st.)	Bootleg
"Standby"	2022	—		Collage
"Kujira" (くじら)	2024	—		Spin
"—" denotes releases that did not chart.

=== Other charted songs ===
Other charted songs
Title	Year	Peak chart positions	Album
"Koe"	2017	4	Green Boys
"Michi"	2017	34	Green Boys

== Awards and nominations ==
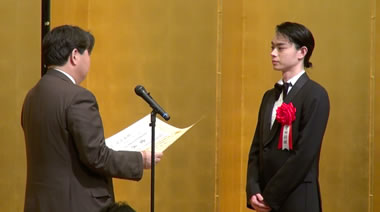
Suda at the 68th Art Encouragement Award Ceremony in 2018

Year	Award	Category	Work(s)	Result	Ref.
2014	37th Japan Academy Film Prize	Newcomer of the Year	The Backwater	Won	
2014	6th Tama Film Awards	Best New Actor Award	The Light Shines Only There, Ushijima the Loan Shark Part 2	Won	
2015	24th Japanese Movie Critics Awards	Best Supporting Actor	The Light Shines Only There, Princess Jellyfish	Won	
2016	40th Elan d'or Awards	Newcomer of the Year	Himself	Won	
2016	GQ Men of the Year 2016		Himself	Won	
2017	38th Yokohama Film Festival	Best Supporting Actor	Destruction Babies	Won	
2017	26th Tokyo Sports Film Awards	Best Supporting Actor	Destruction Babies	Won	
2017	26th Japan Film Professional Awards	Best Actor	Drowning Love and Seto and Utsumi	Won	
2017	42nd Hochi Film Awards	Best Actor	Wilderness and others	Won	
2017	30th Nikkan Sports Film Awards	Best Actor	Wilderness and others	Won	
2018	91st Kinema Junpo Awards	Best Actor	Wilderness and others	Won	
2018	13th Osaka Cinema Festival	Best Actor	Wilderness and others	Won	
2018	72nd Mainichi Film Awards	Best Actor	Wilderness	Won	
2018	41st Japan Academy Film Prize	Best Actor	Wilderness	Won	
2018	60th Blue Ribbon Awards	Best Actor	Wilderness	Nominated	
2019	56th Galaxy Awards	Television Personality	Dele, Suda Masaki TV, Mr. Hiiragi's Homeroom	Won	
2019	12th Tokyo Drama Awards	Best Actor	Mr. Hiiragi's Homeroom	Won	
2020	62nd Blue Ribbon Awards	Best Actor	The Great War of Archimedes	Nominated	
2020	43rd Japan Academy Film Prize	Best Actor	The Great War of Archimedes	Nominated	
2021	44th Japan Academy Film Prize	Best Actor	Threads: Our Tapestry of Love	Nominated	
2021	13th Tama Film Awards	Best Actor	We Made a Beautiful Bouquet	Won	
2022	45th Japan Academy Film Prize	Best Actor	We Made a Beautiful Bouquet	Nominated	
2022	15th Tokyo Drama Awards	Best Actor	Don't Call It Mystery	Won	
2024	47th Japan Academy Film Prize	Best Supporting Actor	Father of the Milky Way Railroad	Nominated	
2026	39th Nikkan Sports Film Awards	Best Supporting Actor	One Last Love Letter and others	Pending	
