= Oricon =

Japanese music corporation

Oricon Inc. 株式会社オリコン
- Type: Holding company, owner of Oricon Entertainment Inc.
- Traded as: TYO: 4800
- Industry: Broadcast of music entertainment (from Japan, North America and Europe)
- Founded: November 1967 (as Original Confidence); October 1, 1999 (as Oricon Direct Digital); June 2001 (as Oricon Global Entertainment); July 2002
- Headquarters: Roppongi, Minato, Tokyo, Japan
- Key people: Soko Koike: CEO
- Owner: see List of Oricon's shareholders
- Number of employees: 198 (full-time workers, as of September 30, 2016)
- Parent: Oricon Entertainment Inc. (October 1999 – June 2001)
- Subsidiaries: Oricon Entertainment Inc. (June 2001 – present)
- Website: Official site of Oricon Inc. Official site of Oricon Charts; Japan Anime News

Oricon Inc. (株式会社オリコン, Kabushiki-gaisha Orikon), established in 1999, is the holding company at the head of a Japanese corporate group that supplies statistics and information on music and the music industry in Japan and Western music. It started as Original Confidence Inc. (株式会社オリジナルコンフィデンス, Kabushiki-gaisha Orijinaru Konfidensu), which was founded by Sōkō Koike in November 1967 and became known for its music charts. Oricon Inc. was originally set up as a subsidiary of Original Confidence and took over the latter's Oricon record charts in April 2002.

The charts are compiled from data drawn from some 39,700 retail outlets (as of April 2011) and provide sales rankings of music CDs, DVDs, electronic games, and other entertainment products based on weekly tabulations. Results are announced every Tuesday and published in Oricon Style by subsidiary Oricon Entertainment Inc. The group also lists panel survey-based popularity ratings for television commercials on its official website.

Oricon started publishing Combined Chart, which includes CD sales, digital sales, and streaming together, on December 19, 2018.

They also started publishing English content related to anime and manga to Japan Anime News powered by ORICON NEWS.

== History ==
Logo from 2017 to 2024

Original Confidence Inc., the original Oricon company, was founded by the former Snow Brand Milk Products promoter Sōkō Koike in 1967. That November, the company began publishing a singles chart on an experimental basis. Entitled Sōgō Geinō Shijō Chōsa (総合芸能市場調査, surveys of total entertainment markets), this went official on January 4, 1968.

Like the preceding Japanese music charts provided by Tokushin Music Report which was started in 1962, early Original Confidence was an exclusive information magazine only for the people who worked in the music industry. In the 1970s, Koike advertised his company's charts to make its existence prevail among the Japanese public. Thanks to his intensive promotional efforts through multiple media including television programs, the hit parade became known by its abbreviation "Oricon" by the late 1970s.

The company shortened its name to Oricon in 1992 and was split into a holding company and several subsidiaries in 1999. Since Sōkō Koike's death, Oricon has been managed by the founder's relatives.

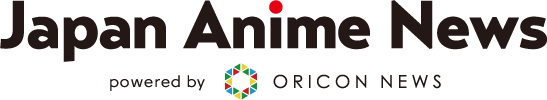
Logo of Japan Anime News

They release an English publication for North America dedicated to anime and manga called Japan Anime News powered by ORICON NEWS.

In 2026, Oricon underwent a management buyout. A tender offer launched by an acquisition vehicle backed by Marunouchi Capital was initially priced at ¥1,332 per share and was later increased to ¥1,370 per share. In September, shareholders approved a 2,333,576-to-1 share consolidation as part of the transaction, and Oricon was delisted from the Tokyo Stock Exchange on September 28, 2026.

== Policy ==
Oricon monitors and reports on sales of CDs, DVDs, video games, and entertainment content in several other formats; manga and book sales were also formerly covered. Charts are published every Tuesday in Oricon Style and on Oricon's official website. Every Monday, Oricon receives data from outlets, but data on merchandise sold through certain channels does not make it into the charts. For example, the debut single of NEWS, a pop group, was released only through 7-Eleven stores, which are not covered by Oricon, and its sales were not reflected in the Oricon charts. Oricon's rankings of record sales are therefore not completely accurate. Before data was collected electronically, the charts were compiled on the basis of faxes that were sent from record shops.

== Controversy ==
In 2006, Oricon sued journalist Hiro Ugaya when he was quoted in a Saizo (or Cyso) magazine article as suggesting that Oricon was manipulating its statistics to benefit certain management companies and labels, specifically Johnny and Associates. Ugaya condemned the lawsuit as an example of a strategic lawsuit against public participation (SLAPP) in Japan. The lawsuit, filed by Oricon on November 17, 2006, accused Ugaya of "mendacious comments" and demanded 50 million yen (318,000 euros) in damages. In the interview, Ugaya had questioned the validity of Oricon's hit chart on the grounds that its statistical methods were not transparent. Many NGOs, including Reporters Without Borders, denounced the lawsuit as a violation of free expression. A Tokyo District Court initially ordered Ugaya to pay one million yen in damages, but Ugaya appealed to the Tokyo high court. Oricon later dropped the charges, after a 33-month battle. A settlement was reached under which the publisher of Saizo magazine, who intervened in the lawsuit from the High Court, apologized to Ugaya for "publishing inaccurate comments without permission" and paid him 5 million yen, and also apologized to Oricon for discrediting the chart. Oricon waived its claim for damages and Ugaya, who had also filed a counterclaim for damages, waived his counterclaim. No criminal charge was laid against the journalist.

Dropping a lawsuit is rare in Japan; for example, only 0.1% of cases that ended in 2007 were on account of the plaintiff ceasing the case. (Note: For abandonments in all first-instance cases before the district courts. Withdrawals account for approximately 33.08%, and in second-instance cases before all high courts, about 0.06% are abandonments and 6.38% are withdrawals (Supreme Court of Japan. Judicial Statistics: FY2017, Civil and Administrative Cases).)

== Shareholders ==
(as of March 31, 2012)

- LitruPond LLC – 29.34%
- Yoshiaki Yoshida (DHC Corp. president) – 8.94%
- Hikari Tsushin, Inc. – 4.94%
- Ko Koike (CEO) – 2.75%
- Lawson, Inc. – 1.98%
- Hidekō Koike – 1.89%
- Naoko Koike – 1.87%
- DHC Corp. – 1.59%
- Yumi Koike – 1.55%

== Charts ==
=== Current charts ===
- Singles Chart (January 4, 1968 – present)
- Albums Chart (October 5, 1987 – present)
- Karaoke Chart (December 26, 1994 – present)
- DVD Chart (April 5, 1999 – present)
- Book Chart (April 7, 2008 – present)
- Comic Chart (February 6, 1995 – March 26, 2001; April 7, 2008 – present)
- Bunkobon Chart (April 7, 2008 – present)
- Blu-ray Disc Chart (September 7, 2008 – present)
- Music DVD & Blu-ray Disc Chart (October 14, 2013 – present)
- Long Hit Album Catalogue Chart (April 2, 2001 – present)
- Digital Albums Chart (November 14, 2016 – present)
- Digital Singles Chart (December 25, 2017 – present)
- Streaming Chart (December 24, 2018 – present)
- Combined Albums Chart (December 24, 2018 – present)
- Combined Singles Chart (December 24, 2018 – present)

=== Past charts ===
- LP Chart (January 5, 1970 – November 27, 1989)
- CT Chart (December 2, 1974 – April 24, 1978)
- Cartridges Chart (December 2, 1974 – April 24, 1978)
- CD Chart (February 6, 1984 – April 21, 1997)
- LD Chart (February 6, 1984 – January 31, 2000)
- Sell-Video Chart (February 6, 1984 – May 30, 2005)
- VHD Chart (February 6, 1984 – November 27, 1989)
- MD Chart (1994)
- Game Software Chart (February 20, 1995 – November 28, 2005)
- All-Genre Formats Ranking (May 24, 1984 – April 2, 2001)
- New Media Chart (January 2004 – 2005)
- Tracks Chart (September 6, 2004 – August 31, 2008)

== Top Artists' total sales revenue by year ==
Year	Artist
1974	Yōsui Inoue
1975	Yōsui Inoue
1976	Yumi Arai
1977	Pink Lady
1978	Pink Lady
1979	Alice
1980	Yellow Magic Orchestra
1981	Akira Terao
1982	Off Course
1983	Akina Nakamori
1984	Seiko Matsuda
1985	Akina Nakamori
1986	Akina Nakamori
1987	Akina Nakamori
1988	Hikaru Genji
1989	Yumi Matsutoya
1990	Southern All Stars
1991	B'z
1992	Chage and Aska
1993	Zard
1994	TRF
1995	TRF
1996	Namie Amuro
1997	Glay
1998	B'z
1999	Hikaru Utada
2000	Ayumi Hamasaki
2001	Ayumi Hamasaki
2002	Hikaru Utada
2003	Ayumi Hamasaki
2004	Hikaru Utada
2005	Orange Range
2006	Kumi Koda
2007	Kumi Koda
2008	Exile
2009	Arashi
2010	Arashi
2011	AKB48
2012	AKB48
2013	Arashi
2014	Arashi
2015	Arashi
2016	Arashi
2017	Arashi
2018	Namie Amuro
2019	Arashi
2020	Arashi
2021	BTS
2022	BTS
2023	King & Prince
2024	Snow Man
2025	Snow Man

== See also ==
- List of Oricon number-one singles
- List of Oricon number-one albums
- List of best-selling singles in Japan
- List of best-selling albums in Japan
