= List of Kaiju No. 8 episodes =

Key visual for the series

Kaiju No. 8 is an anime television series based on Naoya Matsumoto's manga series of the same name. Produced by Production I.G with Studio Khara supervising the kaiju designs and artworks, the anime series was announced in August 2022. The first season aired from April 13 to June 29, 2024, on TV Tokyo and its affiliates, alongside a Twitter simulcast as it aired. The series is directed by Shigeyuki Miya and Tomomi Kamiya with scripts written by Ichiro Okouchi, character designs and chief animation direction by Tetsuya Nishio, art direction by Shinji Kimura, monster designs by Mahiro Maeda and music composed by Yuta Bandoh. For the first season: the opening theme song is "Abyss" performed by Yungblud, while the ending theme song is "Nobody" performed by OneRepublic.

A second season was announced in December 2024 at Jump Festa, and aired from July 19 to September 27, 2025. An original episode, "Hoshina's Day Off" (保科の休日, Hoshina no Kyūjitsu), was screened in Japanese theaters for three weeks starting on March 28, 2025; it aired on TV Tokyo and affiliates on July 5 of the same year. The ending theme song for the "Hoshina's Day Off" original episode is "Invincible" performed by OneRepublic. For the second season: the opening theme song is "You Can't Run From Yourself" performed by Aurora, while the ending theme song is "Beautiful Colors" performed by OneRepublic.

In December 2025, a "conclusion arc" to the anime was announced. In October 2026, it was announced that the conclusion would be an anime film titled Kaiju No. 8: The Final Mission, set to premiere in 2027. Shigeyuki Miya is returning to direct the film.

A series of 31 short episodes, titled Minute! Kaiju No. 8 (ミニっと！かいじゅう8号, Minitto! Kaijū 8-gō), was released on Toho Animation's YouTube channel from December 6, 2024, to July 4, 2025. Another series of four short episodes, titled "Narumi's Week at Work" (鳴海の平日, Narumi no Heijitsu), were released on Toho Animation's YouTube channel from September 5–26, 2026.

Crunchyroll streamed the first season as it aired in Japan, as well as dubbed versions an hour after its televised premiere, and is streaming the second season. The first season was released in Blu-ray on December 9, 2025. Medialink licensed the series for streaming in Southeast Asia on its Ani-One Asia YouTube channel.

== Series overview ==
| Season | Episodes | Originally released | |
| Season | Episodes | First released | Last released |
|---|---|---|---|
| 1 | 12 | April 13, 2024 | June 29, 2024 |
| Special | | July 5, 2025 | |
| 2 | 11 | July 19, 2025 | September 27, 2025 |

== Episodes ==
=== Season 1 (2024) ===
| No. overall | No. in season | Title | Directed by (Note: Production staff information is taken from the ending credits of each episode) | Storyboarded by | Original release date |
|---|---|---|---|---|---|
| 1 | 1 | "The Man Who Became a Kaiju"; Transliteration: "Kaijū ni Natta Otoko" (Japanese: 怪獣になった男) | Tomomi Kamiya | Tomomi Kamiya | April 13, 2024 |
Kafka Hibino works as a cleaner disposing the carcasses of kaijus after they have been eliminated by the Anti-Kaiju Defense Force, a military organization that protects Japan from kaiju. Initially wanting to be part of the Defense Force, Kafka gave up after failing to pass the exam before he got too old, but finds out the Defense Force has recently raised the recruitment age to 32, making him eligible again. At work, Kafka and his new coworker and aspiring Defense Force Member, Reno Ichikawa, are attacked by a kaiju. After holding the kaiju off, the duo are saved by the Defense Force's Third Division led by Captain Mina Ashiro, Kafka's childhood friend with whom he made a promise to fight kaiju together. Later in a hospital, at the encouragement of Reno, Kafka decides to try to join the Defense Force one last time. Kafka is then attacked by a parasitic kaiju that enters his body through his mouth and turns him into a human-kaiju hybrid. A patient reports Kafka's position forcing him and Reno to flee. In a post-credits scene, Mina is called to gather her squad and eliminate the kaiju reported to be at the hospital.
| 2 | 2 | "The Kaiju Who Defeats Kaiju"; Transliteration: "Kaijū o Taosu Kaijū" (Japanese: 怪獣を倒す怪獣) | Takayuki Inagaki | Kazuya Nomura | April 20, 2024 |
Kafka and Reno escape from the hospital to hide from the Defense Force. In his kaiju form Kafka detects a kaiju that emerges from the underground and attacks a nearby house, trapping a woman and her daughter. Kafka steps in and kills the kaiju saving the mother and daughter with the daughter thanking him for his help. Kafka changes back to his human form and escapes the area with Reno. Mina and her squad arrive at the scene and question the girl about what happened. The girl mentions a "good kaiju" that saved her and her mother which surprises Mina. Three months later, Kafka has been given the codename "Kaiju No. 8" due to evading capture. He and Reno are informed by the Defense Force that they passed the first part of the test. The duo go to the Third Division testing grounds for the second part of the test where they meet Kikoru Shinomiya, another recruit, who notices that Kafka smells like a kaiju.
| 3 | 3 | "Revenge Match"; Transliteration: "Ribenji Matchi" (Japanese: リベンジマッチ) | Hitomi Ezoe | Kazumi Yū | April 27, 2024 |
Reno tells Kikoru that Kafka smells like a kaiju because they work as kaiju cleaners, swaying her doubts. Kafka and Reno begin the physical part of the test, which Kafka barely passes, and move on to the aptitude test. The proctor for the exam, the vice-captain of the Third Division, Soshiro Hoshina, explains that the recruits need to eliminate a large group of kaiju in a training area. The recruits are outfitted with power suits, made from kaiju muscle fibers, that empower them, boosting their physical capabilities and their weapons and providing them with a shield that if activated, makes them fail the test. The suits have unleashed combat power expressed as a percentage with Kafka being the only recruit with a 0% output. Despite that, Kafka utilizes his knowledge of kaiju to support others in eliminating the targets when a kaiju attacks him and injures him. Right before his shield activates Kafka is saved by Kikoru. Soshiro advises him to quit due to his injuries. Kafka refuses and chooses to continue as Mina watches his progress.
| 4 | 4 | "Fortitude 9.8"; Transliteration: "Forutichūdo 9.8" (Japanese: フォルティチュード9.8) | Kazuki Yokoyama | Iwao Teraoka | May 4, 2024 |
Kafka and Reno support other recruits in killing the kaiju due to the duo's low unleased combat power. Kikoru runs past other recruits eliminating all the kaiju, ending the aptitude test. Kikoru is attacked by an intelligent, humanoid kaiju that revives all of the kaiju, making them stronger in the process. A flashback reveals that Kikoru's father, the Director General of the Defense Force, Isao Shinomiya, demands from her to be perfect on the battlefield in the memory of her mother who was killed by a kaiju. Kikoru is heavily injured by a stronger revived kaiju and as she is about to be killed, Kafka appears, transforms and kills the kaiju, saving Kikoru's life. Kafka and Reno carry an unconscious Kikoru to safety. While Kafka was fighting in his kaiju form, the Defense Force picked up on a high energy level which is written off as an error. Mina and Soshiro survey the destroyed kaiju with Soshiro suspecting that it is connected to the kaiju Kafka killed three months prior. As Kikoru recuperates in the hospital, Soshiro questions her if she killed the revived kaiju. She lies and says that she did. Later, the humanoid kaiju listens to a news report about the incident, changing its appearance to that of a human kaiju cleaner.
| 5 | 5 | "Joining Up!"; Transliteration: "Nyūtai!" (Japanese: 入隊！) | Kōji Komurakata | Yōjirō Arai | May 11, 2024 |
With the test finished, Reno and Kikoru are inducted into the Defense Force as officers while Kafka is accepted as a cadet to be further trained on Soshiro's recommendation. Secretly, Soshiro suspects that Kafka is hiding something as his vitals were not being picked up when the high energy level was recorded during the test. Kikoru talks with Kafka and Reno about Kafka's power and promises to keep it a secret. She advises Kafka to be careful as the Defense Force would most likely dispose of him since numbered kaiju are used to make more powerful equipment. The trio continue their training within the Third Division. Kafka and Reno befriend recruits Iharu Furuhashi, Haruichi Izumo and Aoi Kaguragi with Kafka revealing that he and Mina are childhood friends. Later, Kafka and Soshiro talk about Kafka's promise to Mina as Soshiro overheard his conversation with the other recruits. Kafka reiterates that he aims to be by Mina's side which Soshiro interprets as a challenge to take his position. Their conversation is cut short by an alarm that indicates a new kaiju emergency.
| 6 | 6 | "Sagamihara Neutralization Operation at Daybreak"; Transliteration: "Yoake no Sagamihara Tōbatsu Sakusen" (Japanese: 夜明けの相模原討伐作戦) | Tetsuji Nakamura | Kazuya Nomura | May 18, 2024 |
The Third Division begins an operation to eliminate a large fungal type kaiju that emerges in Sagamihara. Mina uses her personal weapon, a massive handheld cannon, to eliminate the kaiju. The main kaiju's destruction releases a swarm of smaller kaiju that start approaching the city. Kafka and the rest of the division are tasked with eliminating the swarm to prevent further destruction. Kafka struggles to help in combat due to his low unleashed combat power so he dissects a dead kaiju, finding its core and a set of reproductive organs that allow it to increase its numbers even after death. Soshiro thanks Kafka for his help and the information is spread to other platoons. As Reno and Iharu eliminate kaiju in a part of the city, they encounter the humanoid kaiju that attacked Kikoru during the entrance exam, in its human disguise, as it wonders how the Defense Force found out about the kaiju's anatomy.
| 7 | 7 | "Kaiju No. 9"; Transliteration: "Kaijū Kyu-gō" (Japanese: 怪獣9号) | Yoshihide Ibata | Takayuki Sano & Shigeyuki Miya | May 25, 2024 |
The humanoid kaiju attacks Reno and Iharu, severely injuring the latter. Reno tries to contact the rest of the Third Division but the humanoid kaiju reveals that it formed a "mimetic space" that blocks communications, prevents anything from entering or leaving the space and has allowed it to remain hidden from the Defense Force. Reno and Iharu try to defeat it but are overpowered. As the humanoid kaiju is about to kill the both of them, Kafka arrives and defeats it, bringing down the mimetic space and allowing a pair of Third Division officers to reach the scene, but also allowing the kaiju to flee before Kafka can kill it. Kafka runs away from the area to hide in an alleyway where he is found by Soshiro who attacks him and accuses him of attacking Reno and Iharu. Soshiro removes the limiter from his suit so that he can use his full unleashed combat power and informs the Third Division that he will neutralize Kaiju No. 8.
| 8 | 8 | "Welcome to the Defense Force"; Transliteration: "Bōei Tai e Yōkoso" (Japanese: 防衛隊へようこそ) | Haruo Okuno | Haruo Okuno | June 1, 2024 |
Kafka tries to defend himself long enough to escape without hurting the vice-captain. Soshiro locates Kafka's core intent on destroying it but Kafka successfully counters his attack, breaking the vice-captain's sword, and escapes while avoiding detection. Soshiro informs Mina that he suspects that Kaiju No. 8 might be a daikaiju, a rare and powerful type of kaiju. The humanoid kaiju, now identified by the Defense Force as Kaiju No. 9, kills a man and absorbs him, taking his appearance and goes into hiding. With the mission over, the Third Division holds a party to celebrate their success and Reno and Iharu's recovery. Soshiro announces that Kafka is now officially part of the Defense Force due to his contributions in the mission and is later promoted by Mina who informs Kafka that this was done on Soshiro's recommendation. While Mina leaves the base to have a meeting at headquarters regarding No. 9, Kafka visits Soshiro as the latter is training and thanks him for his trust. While this is happening, in the skies above the base a group of flying kaiju led by a new humanoid kaiju prepare to attack the Third Division base.
| 9 | 9 | "Raid on Tachikawa Base"; Transliteration: "Tachikawa Kichi Shūgeki" (Japanese: 立川基地襲撃) | Kōji Komurakata, Ryōta Furukawa, Claire Barbou des Courières & Hirotaka Mori | Ryōta Furukawa | June 8, 2024 |
The group of flying kaiju land on the Third Division base and begin their assault. Soshiro leads the defense efforts as Mina is still away at headquarters. Kafka identifies the kaiju as wyvern types that are usually solitary and relays this information to Soshiro and the rest of the division. Soshiro deduces that the wyverns are banding together under a leader. The leader is identified as another intelligent and powerful humanoid kaiju. The humanoid attacks Soshiro as he is the strongest fighter on base. While this is happening, Reno, Iharu, Haruichi and Aoi try to eliminate the other wyverns with the help of Kikoru. Soshiro continues fighting the humanoid leading it to the training grounds, utilizing his full unleashed combat power and nearly destroying its core. However, the humanoid keeps its core intact and transforms, increasing in size as it prepares for further battle.
| 10 | 10 | "Secret Revealed"; Transliteration: "Bakuro" (Japanese: 曝露) | Kenta Kushitani | Susumu Nishizawa | June 15, 2024 |
Soshiro's battle against the humanoid continues, but his suit ceases the full output due to the strain it's causing on his body. During the battle, he recalls being told by his father and superiors to give up on joining the Defense Force since he cannot wield firearms well enough. To his surprise, Mina asked him to join her division because his skills might be useful against future smaller kaiju and because she cannot wield blades herself. Remembering the trust Mina showed him, Soshiro continues to fight despite the physical strain until the humanoid grabs a hold of him. Kafka attempts to transform to save him but with the timely return of Mina and with Kikoru's help the Third Division subdue the kaiju. The division's celebration is cut short when they notice that the rest of the wyvern kaiju gathered themselves into a bomb capable of devastating the entire city. Left with no choice, Kafka transforms into his kaiju form in front of everyone, leaps to intercept the bomb, punches it to a higher altitude for it to explode far away from the city. As the dust clears, Mina and the rest of the division gather around Kafka to detain him.
| 11 | 11 | "Kaiju No. 8 Captured"; Transliteration: "Torawareta Kaijū Hachi-gō" (Japanese: 捕らわれた怪獣8号) | Ayataka Tanemura | Ayataka Tanemura | June 22, 2024 |
The top brass of the Defense Force, led by Isao Shinomiya, order the Third Division to hand over Kafka to headquarters in the Ariake maritime base his transport being overseen by the deputy director of the Defense Force, Keiji Itami. While detained, Kafka is informed by Mina that she and the rest of the Third Division do not see him as an enemy and will do everything they can to help him avoid disposal. Mina affirms Kafka's desire to be by her side saying that she waits for his return. Reno, Iharu, Haruichi and Aoi are set to be transferred to other divisions for further training while the Third Division base is rebuilt after its destruction by the other humanoid kaiju, now identified as Kaiju No. 10. Kikoru talks with her father about sparing Kafka's life as he saved her during the aptitude test. Isao, however, shows her an x-ray of Kafka's chest saying that his heart is now a kaiju core and insisting that he is no longer human. Still, Kikoru vouches for Kafka's humanity. Afterwards, Isao fights Kafka in a containment cell to dispose of him. Kafka tries to avoid using his kaiju form to prove his humanity but senses a great power emanating from Isao's suit and realizes that Isao is wearing a Numbers weapon, a more powerful Defense Force suit made from defeated numbered kaiju; his made from the remains of Kaiju No. 2. Before Isao deals the death blow, Kafka fully transforms and fights back. However, deep in Kafka's subconscious, the mysterious kaiju that infected him gains control of his body and directs him to rush towards Isao as Kikoru watches on in horror.
| 12 | 12 | "Kafka Hibino"; Transliteration: "Hibino Kafuka" (Japanese: 日比野カフカ) | Katsuya Kikuchi | Katsuya Kikuchi & Shigeyuki Miya | June 29, 2024 |
The fight between Kafka and Isao continues as Keiji notices that Isao seems to be testing Kafka rather than trying to kill him. Kikoru realizes that her words got through to her father. Kafka becomes more powerful, increases in size and overwhelms Isao. In Kafka's subconscious, the mysterious kaiju devours him and he falls into an abyss. As a berserk Kafka is about to strike Isao, in the abyss Kafka imagines Mina grabbing his hand who says that she will always wait for him. This causes Kafka to strike his own core, preventing himself from killing Isao. Kafka collapses and is taken by medics to be taken care of. The rest of the Third Division remember Kafka's contributions and hope for his return while Mina is called to headquarters to provide information on Kafka as an officer. She praises his efforts and speaks positively about his character recalling the time he comforted her when they were younger. Isao visits Kafka and explains that he decided to keep him alive as an asset for the Defense Force but that the rest of the top brass still see him as a kaiju and that they want him dead. He tells Kafka to prove his worth, calling him by his name. Kafka states he will prove himself as an officer. The Third Division receive news that Kafka's disposal has been deferred. In a post-credits scene, Kaiju No. 9 talks with another version of itself as it prepares its next move.

=== Hoshina's Day Off (2025) ===
| No. | Title | Directed by | Storyboarded by | Original release date |
|---|---|---|---|---|
| 12.5 (Special) | "Hoshina's Day Off"; Transliteration: "Hoshina no Kyūjitsu" (Japanese: 保科の休日) | Shintarō Itoga | Naoki Arakawa | July 5, 2025 |
During their day off duty, Kafka falls ill leaving Reno to spend the day without him. Together with Iharu, Reno decides to follow vice-captain Hoshina to see what he does on his day off. Hoshina buys a rare fried squid snack for Mina and along the way helps Kikoru, Akari, Hakua, Aoi and Haruichi in their errands for the day. Reno and Iharu meet up with Kikoru and rest of the group and they follow Hoshina together. They witness him handing over an item to a suspicious looking man and they fear that Hoshina might be selling military equipment on the black market. Eventually, they catch up with Hoshina at a disaster prevention center where they find out that he was donating his personal equipment. The suspicious looking man turns out to be a former Defense Force member who runs the center. As the group entertain the children at the center, a kaiju emergency alarm sounds off and they leave with Hoshina to tackle the kaiju threat.

=== Season 2 (2025) ===
| No. overall | No. in season | Title | Directed by | Storyboarded by | Original release date |
|---|---|---|---|---|---|
| 13 | 1 | "Kaiju Weapon"; Transliteration: "Kaijū Heiki" (Japanese: 怪獣兵器) | Mineo Oe | Shigeyuki Miya | July 19, 2025 |
While the Third Division base is being rebuilt, Kafka and Kikoru are ordered to join the First Division led by the Defense Force's strongest fighter, captain Gen Narumi. Kikoru goes on a mission with Gen and sees him in action. Afterwards, Kafka is invited to meet Gen. Initially dismissive of the idea that Kafka join the First Division the captain demands that Kafka show his strength or be turned into a weapon for him to use. Reno, Iharu and the rest of the new recruits of the Third Division arrive at the other divisions for reassignment while Mina and Soshiro continue their own training. In a post-credits scene, Tokyo is attacked by an ant kaiju that rises from the underground.
| 14 | 2 | "The Next Generation's Trial"; Transliteration: "Jisedai no Shiren" (Japanese: 次世代の試練) | Kazuma Satō | Kazuya Nomura | July 26, 2025 |
Kafka and Kikoru are sent to a mission for the First Division; fighting against a swarm of ant kaiju that have risen from the underground. The Defense Force establish a field command center where Isao watches the team's progress. Kikoru successfully defeats a group of ant kaiju remembering how she promised her mother, Hikari, that she would join the Defense Force to protect her. Kafka struggles to transform into Kaiju No. 8. He is attacked by a variant of Kaiju No. 9 that has infected one of the ant kaiju. Another variant attacks Gen preventing him from helping Kafka. Kikoru arrives to aid Kafka and engages the other variant of Kaiju No. 9.
| 15 | 3 | "The Strongest Division"; Transliteration: "Saikyō no Butai" (Japanese: 最強の部隊) | Haruo Okuno | Haruo Okuno & Takahito Katayama | August 2, 2025 |
As Kikoru fights against the variant of Kaiju No. 9, Kafka continues to struggle in transforming due to a fear of losing control. Kikoru tells Kafka not to underestimate her or the rest of the team and to believe in them. Kikoru's words assuage Kafka's fears which allows him to transform. In his Kaiju No. 8 form, Kafka proceeds to destroy one variant of Kaiju No. 9 while Gen successfully destroys the other variant using his Numbers 1 weapon that allows him to predict enemy movements.
| 16 | 4 | "The Man Called Isao Shinomiya"; Transliteration: "Shinomiya Isao to iu Otoko" (Japanese: 四ノ宮功という男) | Ryō Kodama | Naoki Arakawa | August 9, 2025 |
The First Division's celebration is cut short when the variants are revealed to be decoys. The real Kaiju No. 9, disguised as a human, infiltrates the command center and attacks Isao aiming to retrieve his Numbers 2 weapon. Kafka, Kikoru and Gen run towards Isao to try and save him. With his Numbers 2 weapon, Isao fights against Kaiju No. 9 nearly destroying it. Kaiju No. 9 survives the final blow and absorbs Isao and his Numbers 2 weapon. Kafka and Gen arrive after the battle and witness Kaiju No. 9 becoming stronger as it changes into a new form.
| 17 | 5 | "I Want to be Strong"; Transliteration: "Tsuyoku Naritai" (Japanese: 強くなりたい) | Shinji Nagata | Kazuya Nomura | August 16, 2025 |
Kafka and Gen try to destroy Kaiju No. 9 but after a short fight it manages to escape the Defense Force. After the battle, the Defense Force holds a funeral for Isao. Kikoru asks Gen to help her become stronger so she can defeat Kaiju No. 9. A scan reveals that a part of Kafka's hand has not turned back to normal leading the medical team to believe that if Kafka continues transforming he might not be able to turn back into a human. After he visits his former coworkers from his old job, Kafka is visited by Gen who tells him that he cannot continue fighting due to his condition. He tells Kafka to continue fighting as Kaiju No. 8 despite the danger to take revenge against Kaiju No. 9. Kafka agrees and decides to continue fighting. At the Third Division base, Soshiro heads to a containment chamber to interrogate the still living Kaiju No. 10 to gather information on Kaiju No. 9.
| 18 | 6 | "Compatible User"; Transliteration: "Tekigōsha" (Japanese: 適合者) | Naoki Matsuura | Shigeyuki Miya | August 23, 2025 |
During the interrogation, Kaiju No. 10 demands that the Defense Force turn him into a weapon for Soshiro to use if they want to gain information on Kaiju No. 9. Soshiro accepts the terms and, in a later meeting with the rest of the divisions of the Defense Force, reveals that Kaiju No. 10 was created by Kaiju No. 9, that it can create even stronger kaiju and that, since it absorbed Isao, it has knowledge of the Defense Force's strength. The divisions agree that they have to strengthen the younger recruits in order to maintain a surprise factor. Soshiro and Mina reveal to the other divisions that Reno is compatible with the Numbers 6 weapon made from the remains of Kaiju No. 6 that give its user the power to control ice. Under captain Jūgo Ogata of the Fourth Division, Reno tries using the Numbers 6 weapon but collapses under the strain of its power. Captain Ogata suggest to Reno to give up as the Numbers weapons are dangerous and can shorten the users lifespan which Reno refuses. The Captain gives Reno a trial period of one month before he sends him to a mission to test if he can use the weapon in the field.
| 19 | 7 | "Wall"; Transliteration: "Kabe" (Japanese: 壁) | Chen Xiaocan | Shinsaku Sasaki | August 30, 2025 |
Reno and Iharu are sent on a mission to destroy a group of kaiju as a test to see if Reno can use the Numbers 6 weapon. Although Reno damages the main kaiju, his strong desire to be stronger in order to save his friends causes great stress to his mind and body and the weapon overpowers him. Reno inadvertently creates a barrier of ice surrounding himself. As Captain Ogata prepares to end the mission, Iharu experiences an increase in his unleashed combat power and breaks through the ice. He carries Reno to safety where he is given another chance to finish the mission.
| 20 | 8 | "Destiny"; Transliteration: "Shukumei" (Japanese: 宿命) | Masateru Nomi | Naoki Arakawa | September 6, 2025 |
Iharu opens up a path for Reno who lands a shot to the main kaiju's core and they complete the mission. Captain Ogata informs Mina that he believes that Reno is capable of using the weapon. At the First Division base, Kafka and Kikoru receive news of Reno's compatibility with the Numbers 6 weapon. While training, Kafka is visited by Soshiro who thanks him for saving the Third Division and asks him to stop fighting so he does not permanently become a kaiju. Kafka refuses to give up and says that he will continue fighting even as a kaiju in order to protect his friends. Soshiro then agrees to train Kafka for future battles. He leads Kafka to a shrine that houses the remains of past kaiju slayers and that is built on the site of a devastating battle that occurred in the Meireki era. Kafka and Soshiro briefly spar at the shrine with Kafka losing the bout. Soshiro complements Kafka's training and gives him advice on how to be a better fighter. He tells Kafka that he will train him in a special fighting style so he can be ready for Kaiju No. 9. As they leave the shrine, Kafka notices a specter of an ancient warrior staring at him.
| 21 | 9 | "Omen"; Transliteration: "Yochō" (Japanese: 予兆) | Haruka Yoshinaga & Ryō Kodama | Katsuya Kikuchi | September 13, 2025 |
Kafka gets into contact with Reno and the rest of the Third Division who he has not talked to since his containment. Kaiju No. 9 continues his creation of stronger kaiju that begin to appear in various places in Japan, disappearing before the Defense Force can destroy them. Kikoru receives her mother's Numbers 4 weapon and trains with Gen to prepare for the incoming battle. Kafka meets Mina on the rooftop of the First Division base where they reminisce on their past and talk about the incoming battle against Kaiju No. 9. Elswhere in Tokyo, a kaiju that disguised itself as Kikoru attacks a group of people and lets out a shriek, signaling to other kaiju to attack.
| 22 | 10 | "Cataclysms"; Transliteration: "Gunpatsu Saigai" (Japanese: 群発災害) | Yūta Mikami | Naoki Arakawa | September 20, 2025 |
Kafka's former coworker, Mizoguchi, is at his daughter's wedding. As he is walking her down the aisle the wedding is stopped by a kaiju. Right before Mizoguchi's daughter is about be devoured by the kaiju, Gen shows up and kills it, saving her. With Japan under attack on all sides, the Defense Force prepares to counter their attack. Kikoru uses her Numbers 4 weapon to reach the battlefield. She quickly dispatches a group of kaiju pinning a Defense Force unit. Hoshina, now wearing a sentient suit of armor made from Kaiju No. 10, drops from a helicopter to a nearby airfield to regain control of it from a group of kaiju. The succeed in defeating them after some struggle to synchronize their attacks. Elsewhere, Kafka's unit is confronted by several giant kaiju. In order to save the unit, Mina loads a giant rail gun on the other side of the city and prepares to fire.
| 23 | 11 | "Second Wave"; Transliteration: "Dai Ni-Ha" (Japanese: 第2波) | Jun Soga, Ryō Kodama & Shōta Hamada | Shigeyuki Miya | September 27, 2025 (Note: This episode aired at 11:15 p.m. JST, 15 minutes after the regular air time.) |
After Mina destroys the giant kaiju attacking Kafka's unit, the attacks from the kaiju briefly subside. Kaiju No. 9 begins the second wave of attacks by sending several stronger kaiju to attack Gen, Kikoru, Hoshina, Mina and the officers of the First Division. Kikoru is attacked by Kaiju No. 15 that takes her appearance and she struggles against it while Gen and Hoshina struggle against the two kaijus created to counter their abilities. The officers of the First Division, led by platoon leader Rin Shinonome, fight against Kaiju No. 13 while Kafka is ordered not to use his kaiju form and to wait for Kaiju No. 9 to appear. Rin tries to defeat No. 13 but is overpowered. As she is about to be killed, Kafka appears and saves her life. He disregards his orders, transforms into his kaiju form and prepares to engage in combat.

== Home media release ==
=== Japanese ===
Toho Animation (Japan – Region 2/A)
| Vol. | Episodes | Cover character(s) | Release date | Ref. |
Season 1
| 1 | 1–3 | Kafka Hibino | July 17, 2024 | |
| 2 | 4–6 | Reno Ichikawa | August 21, 2024 | |
| 3 | 7–9 | Kikoru Shinomiya | September 18, 2024 | |
| 4 | 10–12 | Mina Ashiro | October 16, 2024 | |
Season 2
| 5 | 13–14 + Hoshina's Day Off | Soshiro Hoshina | October 15, 2025 | |
| 6 | 15–17 | Gen Narumi | November 19, 2025 | |
| 7 | 18–20 | Isao Shinomiya | December 17, 2025 | |
| 8 | 21–23 | Kaiju No. 8 | January 21, 2026 | |

=== English ===
Crunchyroll, LLC (North America – Region 1/A)
| Vol. | Discs | Episodes | Standard edition release date | Limited edition release date | Ref. |
|---|---|---|---|---|---|
| Season 1 | 2 | 1–12 | December 9, 2025 | | |
