= List of Kaiju No. 8 chapters =

Kaiju No. 8 is a Japanese manga series written and illustrated by Naoya Matsumoto which was serialized on Shueisha's Shōnen Jump+ app and website from July 3, 2020, to July 18, 2025, with its chapters collected in 16 tankōbon volumes, and on Shueisha's Manga Plus website and app since July 22, 2020, under the title Monster #8 in English and several other languages. (Note: As of November 9, 2024, the series is also available in Spanish, Thai, Indonesian, Russian, French, Brazilian Portuguese and Vietnamese.) The 16th and final volume was released on September 4, 2025. The story follows Kafka Hibino who, after ingesting a parasitic creature, gains the ability to turn into a kaiju and now must navigate using his power while trying to become part of an organization that eliminates kaiju to fulfill a promise he made with a childhood friend.

Viz Media began publishing the series in English on its website on August 2, 2020, under the title Kaiju No. 8, and on February 19, 2021, it announced that it had licensed the series for print in English, releasing the first volume on December 7, 2021.

== Manga ==
=== Kaiju No. 8 ===
No.	Original release date	Original ISBN	English release date	English ISBN
1	December 4, 2020	978-4-08-882525-0	December 7, 2021	978-1-9747-2598-4
Chapter: 1–7
While Kafka Hibino labors for Monster Sweeper Inc. to clean up a dead kaiju, he meets and befriends Reno Ichikawa. It was killed by his childhood friend Mina Ashiro, now serving as a captain in the Japan Anti-Kaiju Defense Force (JAKDF), leader of its Third Division (3D). Reno is a new part-timer working with Kafka who plans to undergo enlistment trials to join the JAKDF; although Kafka has tried to enlist numerous times, he failed. When Reno tells Kafka the age limit has been raised to 33, they plan to enlist together. During another cleanup, they are injured by a yoju, a residual kaiju that commonly arrives after the strong honju are defeated; in the hospital, Kafka swallows a small monster, becoming the eponymous Kaiju No. 8 (K8). While running away with Reno, Kaiju No. 8 saves a mother and daughter from another yoju and vows to join the JAKDF after learning how to switch between Kafka and K8. Reno and Kafka compete with fellow examinees Haruichi Izumo, Iharu Furuhashi, Aoi Kaguragi, and Kikoru Shinomiya, "the greatest talent of all time". After struggling with the fitness portion due to his age, Kafka and the others are fitted with JAKDF suits and sent to neutralize honju and yoju as the final exam. Kafka leans on his cleaning experience to support the others. After Kikoru completes the task by finishing off the final honju, a mysterious humanoid kaiju appears and revives it, threatening Kikoru; Kafka transforms into K8 to save her.
2	March 4, 2021	978-4-08-882611-0	April 5, 2022	978-1-9747-2714-8
Chapter: 8–17
K8 is a daikaiju, one of the strongest ever. The humanoid kaiju is surprised to learn there were no fatalities before disguising as a human and joining coworkers at Monster Sweeper. JAKDF 3D Vice Captain Soshiro Hoshina enrolls Kafka as a cadet rather than an officer, privately voicing suspicions about K8. After two months of intense training, Kafka and the other rookies are deployed to their first mission, tackling the yoju offspring of a mushroom-like honju in Sagamihara, which Mina dispatches easily. Kafka notices the slain yoju have reproductive organs and the humanoid kaiju reveals itself to Reno and Iharu. Kafka and Kikoru realize the sudden radio silence means trouble, and K8 rescues Reno and Iharu.
3	June 4, 2021	978-4-08-882671-4	July 12, 2022	978-1-9747-2899-2
Chapter: 18–26
K8 knocks down the humanoid kaiju, but it escapes after JAKDF reinforcements distract K8; as news reports name it Kaiju No. 9 (K9), it assumes the identity of another human. K8 encounters Soshiro but manages to flee. Two weeks later, the team celebrates the successful completion of their first mission and Kafka is named a regular officer. That night, multiple honju invade Tachikawa Base; while Soshiro tackles the daikaiju leader, to repel the other kaiju, Kikoru wields a massive axe and Reno uses freeze rounds.
4	September 3, 2021	978-4-08-882815-2	October 11, 2022	978-1-9747-3234-0
Chapter: 27–35
Soshiro struggles against the daikaiju leader, retroactively designated Kaiju No. 10 (K10); as his overheating suit shuts down, Mina returns to the base and blasts the core of K10 after Kikoru and Soshiro collaborate to hobble it. As the team starts to relax, Kafka publicly reveals himself as K8 by transforming to save the senior officers from an imminent threat. Mina and the rest of the 3D apprehend Kafka. The JAKDF General Director, and Kikoru's father, Isao Shinomiya orders the 3D to hand Kafka over to headquarters. While they are escorting Kafka to headquarters, Mina reassures him that no one in 3D sees him as a threat and that they will try to help him avoid execution. With their forces depleted, 3D is temporarily dissolved and its officers are transferred to other divisions. Isao visits Kafka and shoots him, noting that Kafka could not stop bullets with his bare skin if he remained human, then begins to fight K8 using a suit and weapons derived from Kaiju No. 2.
5	December 3, 2021	978-4-08-882872-5	January 10, 2023	978-1-9747-3418-4
Chapter: 36–43
Kafka finds himself unable to control K8 during the fight but manages to prove his humanity to Isao, who warns him his survival depends on how useful he is. Kikoru and Kafka are assigned to 1D under Captain Gen Narumi; he demands they demonstrate overwhelming skill. After an earthquake opens up a sinkhole in Shinagawa, unleashing ant-like kaiju, 1D is deployed to clean up. Kafka fails to transform into K8 as K9 emerges, but Kikoru defends Kafka.
6	March 4, 2022	978-4-08-883053-7	April 11, 2023	978-1-9747-3633-1
Chapter: 44–51
A flashback shows former 2D Captain Hikari Shinomiya, Kikoru's mother. Hikari wielded Numbers Weapon 4 (NW4), derived from Kaiju No. 4, and was killed while fighting Kaiju No. 6; Kikoru's ambition comes from Hikari's sacrifice. Kafka realizes his fear of being fully subsumed into K8 is preventing the transformation. K9 had split part of its core to engage Gen; K8 unlocks new strength to knock down the primary K9 (K9-alpha). The secondary K9 (K9-beta) gains a temporary advantage over Gen until he uses RT-0001, the grafted retina from Kaiju No. 1, allowing him to predict K9-beta's moves. After Isao praises the team for defeating K9-alpha and -beta, they realize that both were decoys (K9-beta and -gamma), and the real primary K9-alpha attacks Isao to take Numbers Weapon 2 (NW2). During the fight, Isao attempts to destroy K9-alpha, striking it twice with directed energy blasts and exposing its core, but fails.
7	July 4, 2022	978-4-08-883170-1	July 11, 2023	978-1-9747-3869-4
Chapter: 52–59
K9 kills Isao and fuses with his body, taking control of NW2, then flees after fighting K8 and Gen. After the funeral service for Isao, Kikoru and Kafka both vow to take down K9; Kikoru spars with 1D platoon leader Rin Shinonome under Gen's training program; a small spot on Kafka's hand will not revert to human. K10 confesses that it was created by K9 and offers to become a Numbers Weapon for Soshiro so it can continue to fight. Leaders of 1D, 2D, 3D, and 4D meet at an anti-K9 conference, presided over by new General Director Keiji Itami; Soshiro reveals that K10 was a prototype and proposes a merger of divisions. Reno, who was reassigned to 4D under Captain Juugo Ogata, is identified as a potential match for Numbers Weapon 6 (NW6); Juugo proposes a one-month trial period before he is willing to approve NW6 for Reno.
8	November 4, 2022	978-4-08-883305-7	October 10, 2023	978-1-9747-4062-8
Chapter: 60–66
A month later, Reno has improved enough with the NW6 suit to tackle a recurring honju at Bungui-toge Pass in Haseichinose, Ina, Nagano; during the fight, Reno's combat power increases abnormally and Iharu steps in to help. Iharu reminds Juugo of himself; in a flashback, Juugo recalls Hikari's excitement at her trial with NW4 and vows to impress the danger of self-sacrifice on the next generation. Kafka frets the JAKDF only needs K8; Soshiro trains him in unarmed combat to minimize the time he spends transformed as K8.
9	March 3, 2023	978-4-08-883443-6	January 2, 2024	978-1-9747-4301-8
Chapter: 67–73
After two months, Kafka's phone is returned and he reluctantly takes a phone call from Reno and Iharu, who reassure him that everyone in 3D sees him as a friend. Before the disquieting calm ends, he shares a lunch with Ashiro as they reminisce about their school days. Simultaneous kaiju attacks erupt nationwide; for the first time in a decade, the NW4 suit is deployed, now worn by Kikoru. Gen saves a wedding party in Sumida Ward from an unwanted guest. 6D Captain Soichiro Hoshina, the older brother of Soshiro, reports in from Himeji. Soshiro enters the battle at Chōfu Airport wearing NW10, which retains the sentience of K10; they argue and are nearly killed before Soshiro decides to follow K10's lead by allowing it to control his body.
10	August 4, 2023	978-4-08-883613-3	June 4, 2024	978-1-9747-4699-6
Chapter: 74–81
Soshiro and K10 continue to bicker but exhibit astonishing success and synchronized power output against the kaiju as they secure the runway. As platoon leaders Rin Shinonome and Tachibana face six supergiant-class kaiju in Ōizumi, Mina uses a railgun to snipe them from Tachikawa, 20 km (12 mi) away. Daikaiju emerge to confront key officers: Kaiju No. 11 vs. Gen Narumi, K12 vs. Soshiro Hoshina, K13 vs. Tachibana and Rin Shinonome, K14 vs. Mina Ashiro, and K15 vs. Kikoru Shinomiya. Kikoru struggles against K15, but she declines reinforcements, saying she will win after catching up to Hikari's use of NW4. Although she cuts K15 to pieces, K15 initiates a psychogenic attack, targeting Kikoru's desire for her parents' praise. Similarly, the other daikaiju gain the upper hand, as each were created to target their respective officer's weaknesses.
11	December 4, 2023	978-4-08-883747-5	October 1, 2024	978-1-9747-4900-3
Chapter: 82–89
After K13 defeats Tachibana and Rin, Kafka arrives and, transforming to K8, pulverizes it. Kikoru finds new motivations and slices K15; as K15's core fades, a brief flashback to K15's training demonstrates how differently K9 treated K15 compared to Isao and Kikoru. K11 taunts Gen by predicting and reciting his moves from Isao's memories. Gen recalls his frustration that Isao was killed before Gen could impress him by demonstrating the true future sight; Gen unleashes it to beat K11. Soshiro realizes that K12 is an improvement of K10 and switches to single-blade form, for which K9 had not prepared K12.
12	April 4, 2024	978-4-08-883898-4	February 25, 2025	978-1-9747-5272-0
Chapter: 90–97
K12 manages to gain the upper hand, but K10 saves Soshiro by sacrificing its tail and he realizes he enjoys combat as much as K10. Using three swords simultaneously, one grasped in the tail, Soshiro and K10 defeat K12 with a new technique. While engaging K14, Mina has a flashback to her early career with the JAKDF; even after she was identified and celebrated as a sniper, she still struggles with fear over harm coming to fellow soldiers and citizens. After K14 is taken down, K9 emerges, isolating Mina behind a horde of daikaiju and threatening to extract her powers.
13	July 4, 2024	978-4-08-884160-1	June 3, 2025	978-1-9747-5512-7
Chapter: 98–104
K9 reveals its plan to create an army of K6-class daikaiju, augmented with Mina's sharpshooter skills. K8 is torn between abandoning the public to the horde and rushing off to help Mina. Reno reassures K8 that he can protect the citizens; the remaining members of 3D reunite, having completed their missions elsewhere. Juugo trained Iharu in the desperate combat style, allowing Iharu to optimize his inconsistent combat power level. Gen realizes that K9 is controlling the horde remotely and proposes an all-out attack on K9 rather than wasting effort on the drones. As K9 begins to absorb Mina, her pet tiger Bakko fights back. K9 reveals that it is a composite of all the kaiju and humans it has absorbed for hundreds of years; she nearly succumbs, but K8 pulls her away from K9.
14	November 1, 2024	978-4-08-884315-5	September 2, 2025	978-1-9747-5839-5
Chapter: 105–112
K8 confronts K9. Using Isao's memories and squadron-style combat technique, K9 begins to beat down K8, but K8 surprises it with a new move variant, exposing K9's core; K9 evolves into a two-headed kaiju with K2 before K8 can crush the core, pushing K8 back. After K9 seizes K8's exposed core, Mina saves K8. Mina and Kafka ruefully muse how none of their childhood dreams came true, save their vow to fight together. Kafka lifts the restrictions on K8 to gain a final advantage over K9. K9 calls K8 a kaiju designed to kill kaiju; K8 subdues K9 long enough for Mina to retrieve her main weapon. After Mina shatters K9's shield, Isao/K2 takes control long enough for K8 to punch K9's core.
15	March 4, 2025	978-4-08-884492-3	March 17, 2026	978-1-9747-6227-9
Chapter: 113–119
As K9's core cracks, it draws K8 into its memories of the Meireki era and its composite daikaiju. The JAKDF only can see that K9 has impaled K8's core; K8's vital signs fade as K9 revives. Soshiro and Gen join the fight against K9, who easily fends off their fierce tag-team. Adrift in an internal world, Kafka asks to return to the fight and an armored warrior invites him to form a deeper connection by immersing him in a memory of what started as a typical Edo period kaiju battle; unlike other fights, a multi-eyed daikaiju emerged and devastated the defenders. A larva-like kaiju formed from their shame, which was what turned Kafka into K8. The warrior offers either to return his human heart and surrender, or turn it into a new core to rejoin the fight, which would irreversibly transform him into K8. Kafka chooses to fight. Soshiro and Gen fight K9 again to buy time for K8's revival; as Gen overheats and succumbs, K8 returns.
16	September 4, 2025	978-4-08-884726-9	September 1, 2026	978-1-9747-1674-6
Chapter: 120–129
Soshiro realizes K8's rapid healing means something has changed. In a brief flashback, a young Kafka sees an emerging kaiju devastating his friends and family, renewing his fighting spirit, and K8 enters an enhanced form which exceeds the fortitude scale, but remains unmistakably Kafka; K9 suggests they move away to keep the humans safe, K8 agrees by punching it away. The true form of K9 emerges and previously defeated kaiju revive all over Japan, keeping K8 at bay, so Gen uses sight from NW1 and asks Kikoru to open a path for K8. She uses her unprecedented secret compatibility with NW1, 2, 4, and 7, promising to mourn her father after she helps K8 shatter K9's core. K9 shifts its shields to protect its primary core; together, Kikoru and K8 push K9 back and Mina snipes the core, but is repelled by K9's counterattack. Kikoru summons her strength to expose the core for K8, who punches through the core, backed by comrades old and new. K9 lets out an agonized shriek and Japan lets out a nationwide cheer as K9 is defeated; the grudge spirits leave K8, who collapses as his life fades. Then Isao appears, giving Kafka a new mission along with a new core; K8's mask cracks open, revealing Kafka's face. Four months later, Kafka wakes up from a coma to learn the grudge spirits have remained, possibly under Isao's command. Returning to Tachikawa Base, he reminisces about his memories of training and is greeted warmly by the rest of 3D. One year after the K9 fight, 3D is as strong as 1D. Kikoru is promoted to vice-captain of 1D and Kafka becomes the platoon leader of the newly formed 3D analytical support squad, occasionally transforming back into K8 when needed.

=== Kaiju No. 8: B-Side ===
Kaiju No. 8: B-Side (怪獣8号 side B) is a spin-off that ran from January 5 to July 12, 2024, on Shōnen Jump+ illustrated by Kentaro Hidano. The spin-off is based on the light novel Kaiju No. 8: Exclusive on the Third Division, written by Keiji Andō, and features side-stories of Defense Force members. Shueisha collected its chapters in two tankōbon volumes that were released on April 4 and October 4, 2024.

Shueisha and Viz Media began publishing the series in English on January 4, 2024, Shueisha on its Manga Plus website and app and Viz Media on its Shonen Jump website and app. Viz Media released the volumes in print on April 8 and September 2, 2025.

No.	Original release date	Original ISBN	English release date	English ISBN
1	April 4, 2024	978-4-08-884010-9	April 8, 2025	978-1-9747-5285-0
1. "Twin Blades of Reminiscence" (追憶の双刀, Tsuioku no Sō Katana); 2. "Buried Fire" (埋もれた火, Umoreta Hi); 3. "Void at the End of the Road" (道の先の虚空, Michi no Saki no Kokū); 4. "An Outstretched Hand" (差し出された手, Sashidasareta Te); 5. "Valkyrie Blues" (戦乙女の憂鬱, Ikusa Otome no Yūutsu); 6. "Goddess of Destruction" (破壊の女神, Hakai no Megami)
2	October 4, 2024	978-4-08-884271-4	September 2, 2025	978-1-9747-5838-8
7. "Crab Collision" (蟹硬戦, Kankōsen); 8. "A Strike Unmatched" (一擊、無双, Ichigeki, Musō); 9. "Dirty, Unpolished Stone" (泥だらけの原石, Dorodarake no Genseki); 10. "The Elite Division's Problem Child" (エリート部隊の 問題児, Erīto Butai no Mondaiji); 11. "Where the Lone Wolf Belongs" (孤狼の居場所, Korō no Ibasho); 12. "The Successor of the Mightiest" (最強を継ぐ酱, Saikyō o Tsugu jan)

=== Kaiju No. 8 Relax ===
Kaiju No. 8 Relax is the second spin-off manga illustrated by Kizuku Watanabe that began its serialization in Saikyō Jump on June 4, 2024, and on Shōnen Jump+ on June 7 of the same year. Viz Media began publishing the series in print, with the first volume releasing on December 2, 2025.

No.	Original release date	Original ISBN	English release date	English ISBN
1	November 1, 2024	978-4-08-884312-4	December 2, 2025	978-1-9747-5919-4
2	April 4, 2025	978-4-08-884418-3	April 14, 2026	978-1-9747-6245-3
3	September 4, 2025	978-4-08-884661-3	August 4, 2026	978-1-9747-1675-3
4	March 4, 2026	978-4-08-884844-0	—	—
5	September 4, 2026	978-4-08-885184-6	—	—

== Novel ==
=== Kaiju No. 8: Exclusive on the Third Division ===
A 4-chapter side-story light novel titled Kaiju No. 8: Exclusive on the Third Division (怪獣8号 密着！第3部隊, Kaijū Hachigō: Mitchaku! Daisan Butai) written by Keiji Andō and illustrated by Matsumoto, was released on November 4, 2022. On February 2, 2024, Viz Media announced that it had licensed the light novel for print in English. It was published on December 3, 2024.
