= Belle (2021 soundtrack) =

Belle Original Soundtrack
- Standard edition cover

Soundtrack album by Taisei Iwasaki, Ludvig Forssell, and Yuta Bandoh
- Released: August 18, 2021
- Studios: Victor; Bunkamura; Tanta (Shibuya, Tokyo, Japan); Abbey Road (London, UK)
- Genres: Film score; Emo pop
- Length: 76:52
- Languages: Japanese; English; Latin
- Label: Ariola Japan
- Producer: Taisei Iwasaki

Studio Chizu chronology
| Mirai: Original Motion Picture Soundtrack (2018) | Belle Original Soundtrack (2021) |

Alternative cover
- First press limited edition cover

Belle Original Soundtrack (「竜とそばかすの姫」オリジナル・サウンドトラック, 「Ryū to Sobakasu no Hime」Orijinaru・Saundotorakku) is the soundtrack for the 2021 Japanese animation film Belle. It was composed by Taisei Iwasaki, Ludvig Forssell, and Yuta Bandoh, and released on August 18, 2021, by Ariola Japan.

An English edition of the album was released on January 14, 2022, by Milan Records.

== Track listing ==
Belle Original Soundtrack standard edition
| No. | Title | Lyrics | Music | Artist | Length |
|---|---|---|---|---|---|
| 1. | "U" (digital track only) | Daiki Tsuneta | Tsuneta | millennium parade Kaho Nakamura | 3:07 |
| 2. | "Whispers (ささやき, Sasayaki)" | Nakamura | Ludvig Forssell | Nakamura | 0:28 |
| 3. | "Slingshot" | | Miho Hazama; Taisei Iwasaki | | 2:56 |
| 4. | "Memories of a Sound (遠い音色, Tōi neiro)" | | Iwasaki | | 1:29 |
| 5. | "Blunt Words" | Forssell | Forssell | ermhoi | 1:18 |
| 6. | "Gales of Song (歌よ, Uta yo)" | Nakamura | Forssell | Nakamura | 3:59 |
| 7. | "Fleeting Days (儚い日常, Hakanai nichijō)" | | Forssell | | 0:40 |
| 8. | "Swarms of Song (導き, Michibiki)" | Nakamura | Forssell | Nakamura | 1:38 |
| 9. | "Alle Psallite Cum Luya (いざ、リラを奏でて歌わん, Iza, rira o kanadete utawan)" | | | Ryoko Moriyama; Sachiyo Nakao; Fuyumi Sakamoto; Yoshimi Iwasaki; Michiko Shimizu; Nakamura | 0:38 |
| 10. | "Fama Destinata" (Destined Fame) | | Forssell | Nakamura | 2:18 |
| 11. | "Dragon (竜, Ryū)" | | Yuta Bandoh | | 1:28 |
| 12. | "Justin (ジャスティン, Jasutin)" | | Bandoh | | 1:11 |
| 13. | "Unveil (アンベイル, Anbeiru)" | | Bandoh | | 1:33 |
| 14. | "Digital Ripples (電網鼓動, Denmō kodō)" | | Forssell | | 5:21 |
| 15. | "Dragon's Lair (竜の城, Ryū no shiro)" | | Bandoh | | 3:10 |
| 16. | "Lend Me Your Voice (Draft) (心のそばに(鈴), Kokoro no soba ni (Suzu))" | Mamoru Hosoda; Nakamura; Iwasaki | Iwasaki | Nakamura | 1:16 |
| 17. | "Social Warfare (手のひらの戦乱, Tenohira no senran)" | | Forssell | | 1:19 |
| 18. | "Assault (強襲, Kyōshū)" | | Bandoh | | 3:48 |
| 19. | "Lend Me Your Voice (心のそばに, Kokoro no soba ni)" | Hosoda; Nakamura; Iwasaki | Iwasaki | Nakamura | 5:03 |
| 20. | "#UnveilTheBeast" | | Forssell | | 1:38 |
| 21. | "Authority and Arrogance (倨傲の権力, Kyogō no kenryoku)" | | Forssell | | 2:04 |
| 22. | "Scorching the Facade (竜の城、燃ゆ, Ryū no shiro, rán yu)" | | Bandoh | | 3:44 |
| 23. | "The Truth Obscured (潜む真実, Hisomu shinjitsu)" | | Forssell | | 1:04 |
| 24. | "Lend Me Your Voice (Humming) (心のそばに(知くん), Kokoro no soba ni (Tomo-kun))" | | Iwasaki | HANA | 0:48 |
| 25. | "Distrust (不信, Fushin)" | | Forssell | | 2:47 |
| 26. | "A Million Miles Away (はなればなれの君へ, Hanarebanare no kimi e)" | Hosoda; Nakamura; Iwasaki | Iwasaki | Nakamura | 8:01; 3:08 (part 1); 1:06 (part 2); 1:45 (part 3); 2:01 (part 4) |
| 27. | "Pieces of the Puzzle (糸口, Itoguchi)" | | Forssell | | 2:14 |
| 28. | "Faces in the Rain (素顔, Sugao)" | | Iwasaki; Bandoh | Nakamura | 2:22 |
| 29. | "Skies of Song (辿り着いた空, Tadoritsuita sora)" | Nakamura | Forssell | Nakamura | 3:02 |
| 30. | "A Million Miles Away (reprise) (はなればなれの君へ (reprise), Hanarebanare no kimi e (reprise))" | Hosoda; Nakamura; Iwasaki | Iwasaki | Nakamura | 6:29 |
| Total length: | | | | | 76:52 |

Belle Original Soundtrack English edition
| No. | Title | Lyrics | Music | Artist | Length |
|---|---|---|---|---|---|
| 1. | "U" (English Version; digital track only) | Daiki Tsuneta; Ludvig Forssell (translation) | Tsuneta | millennium parade Kylie McNeill | 3:07 |
| 2. | "Whispers" (English Version) | Kaho Nakamura; Forssell (translation) | Forssell | McNeill | 0:28 |
| 3. | "Slingshot" | | Miho Hazama, Taisei Iwasaki | | 2:56 |
| 4. | "Memories of a Sound" | | Taisei Iwasaki | | 1:29 |
| 5. | "Blunt Words" | Forssell | Forssell | ermhoi | 1:18 |
| 6. | "Gales of Song" (English Version) | Nakamura; Forssell (translation) | Forssell | McNeill | 3:59 |
| 7. | "Fleeting Days" | | Forssell | | 0:40 |
| 8. | "Swarms of Song" (English Version) | Nakamura; Forssell (translation) | Forssell | McNeill | 1:38 |
| 9. | "Alle Psallite Cum Luya" | | | Ryoko Moriyama; Sachiyo Nakao; Fuyumi Sakamoto; Yoshimi Iwasaki; Michiko Shimizu; Nakamura | 0:38 |
| 10. | "Fama Destinata" (English Version) | | Forssell | McNeill | 2:18 |
| 11. | "Dragon" | | Yuta Bandoh | | 1:28 |
| 12. | "Justin" | | Bandoh | | 1:11 |
| 13. | "Unveil" | | Bandoh | | 1:33 |
| 14. | "Digital Ripples" | | Forssell | | 5:21 |
| 15. | "Dragon's Lair" | | Bandoh | | 3:10 |
| 16. | "Lend Me Your Voice (Draft)" (English Version) | Mamoru Hosoda; Nakamura; Iwasaki; Forssell (translation) | Taisei Iwasaki | McNeill | 1:16 |
| 17. | "Social Warfare" | | Forssell | | 1:19 |
| 18. | "Assault" | | Bandoh | | 3:48 |
| 19. | "Lend Me Your Voice" (English Version) | Hosoda; Nakamura; Iwasaki; Forssell (translation) | Iwasaki | McNeill | 5:03 |
| 20. | "#UnveilTheBeast" | | Forssell | | 1:38 |
| 21. | "Authority and Arrogance" | | Forssell | | 2:04 |
| 22. | "Scorching the Facade" | | Bandoh | | 3:44 |
| 23. | "The Truth Obscured" | | Forssell | | 1:04 |
| 24. | "Lend Me Your Voice (Humming)" (English Version) | | Iwasaki | Bentley Griffin | 0:48 |
| 25. | "Distrust" | | Forssell | | 2:47 |
| 26. | "A Million Miles Away" (English Version) | Hosoda; Nakamura; Iwasaki; Forssell (translation) | Iwasaki | McNeill | 8:01 |
| 27. | "Pieces of the Puzzle" | | Forssell | | 2:14 |
| 28. | "Faces in the Rain" (English Version) | | Iwasaki; Bandoh | McNeill | 2:22 |
| 29. | "Skies of Song" (English Version) | Nakamura; Forssell (translation) | Forssell | McNeill | 3:02 |
| 30. | "A Million Miles Away (reprise)" (English Version) | Hosoda; Nakamura; Iwasaki; Forssell (translation) | Iwasaki | McNeill | 6:29 |
| Total length: | | | | | 76:52 |

== Awards ==
| Year | Ceremony | Award | Result |
|---|---|---|---|
| 2023 | 18th AnimaniA Awards | Best Anime Score | Won |

== Charts ==
=== Weekly charts ===
Weekly chart performance for Belle Original Soundtrack
| Chart (2021) | Peak position |
|---|---|
| Japanese Albums (Oricon) | 4 |
| Japanese Hot Albums (Billboard Japan) | 9 |

=== Year-end charts ===
Year-end chart performance for Belle Original Soundtrack
| Chart (2021) | Position |
|---|---|
| Japanese Download Albums (Billboard Japan) | 22 |

== Sales ==
| Region | Certification | Certified units/sales |
|---|---|---|
| Japan | — | 15,658 |
