= Kylie McNeill =

- Born: Kylie McNeill; February 21, 2002 (age 24)
- Origin: New York City, New York, U.S
- Occupations: Singer, Actor, Songwriter

Kylie McNeill (born February 21, 2002) is an American singer, actress, and songwriter based in New York City and Los Angeles. She is known for portraying the lead roles of Belle and Suzu in the film Belle by Academy Award nominated director Mamoru Hosoda. She was the lead vocalist on Belle Original Soundtrack (English Edition) released by label Milan Records and Sony Music Entertainment.

Most recently, she guest starred as Ruby Conzo on Law & Order: Special Victims Unit episode titled "Economics of Shame" (Season 26, Episode 5).

== Early life ==
McNeill was born in New York City. Both of her parents are actors "and her abuelo was a Flamenco singer." She graduated as a Musical Theater Major from the Professional Performing Arts School in Midtown Manhattan. After graduating, she began posting original songs on her YouTube Channel.

She was a finalist in the Mabel Mercer Foundation's 31st Annual Cabaret Convention in 2020 and was spotlighted in The New York Times.

== Career ==
McNeill began her career in 2016 as a part of the revival cast of Runaways, written by Elizabeth Swados, at New York City Center and later at the Delacorte Theater for The Public Theater's Annual Gala in 2018. The musical revival was directed by Sam Pinkleton and artistically directed by Jeanine Tesori.

In 2021, McNeill was cast as Young Maureen in the film Who is Christmas Eve?.

In 2022, McNeill starred as Belle and Suzu in the anime film Belle by director Mamoru Hosoda, and working alongside voice cast members Chace Crawford, Hunter Shafer and Manny Jacinto. She was the lead vocalist on Belle Original Soundtrack (English Edition).

McNeill performed her solo concert promoting Belle Original Soundtrack as well as her own original music.

In 2024, McNeill guest-starred as Ruby Conzo on Law & Order: Special Victims Unit, Season 26 Episode 5, titled "Economics of Shame", working opposite Mariska Hargitay.

== Filmography ==
Television
Year	Title	Role	Notes
2024	Law & Order: Special Victims Unit	Ruby Conzo	Directed by Norberto Barba for Wolf Entertainment and NBC
2026	Widow's Bay	Kelly	Directed by Hiro Murai for Apple TV

Film
Year	Title	Role	Notes
2021	Who Is Christmas Eve?	Young Maureen	Directed by Christina Faith for BounceTV
2022	Belle	Belle/Suzu	Directed by Mamoru Hosoda, Produced by Studio Chizu, Distributed by GKIDS

== Discography ==
Year	Title	Album Details	Notes
2022	Belle Original Soundtrack (English Edition)	Label: Milan Records, Sony Music Entertainment; Release Date: January 14, 2022	Credited as Belle and as Kylie McNeill
