= Michiko Shimizu =

Michiko Shimizu may refer to:

- Michiko Shimizu (athlete)
- Michiko Shimizu (entertainer)
