= Michiko Shimizu (entertainer) =

Japanese comedian and actress (born 1960)

- 清水 ミチコ
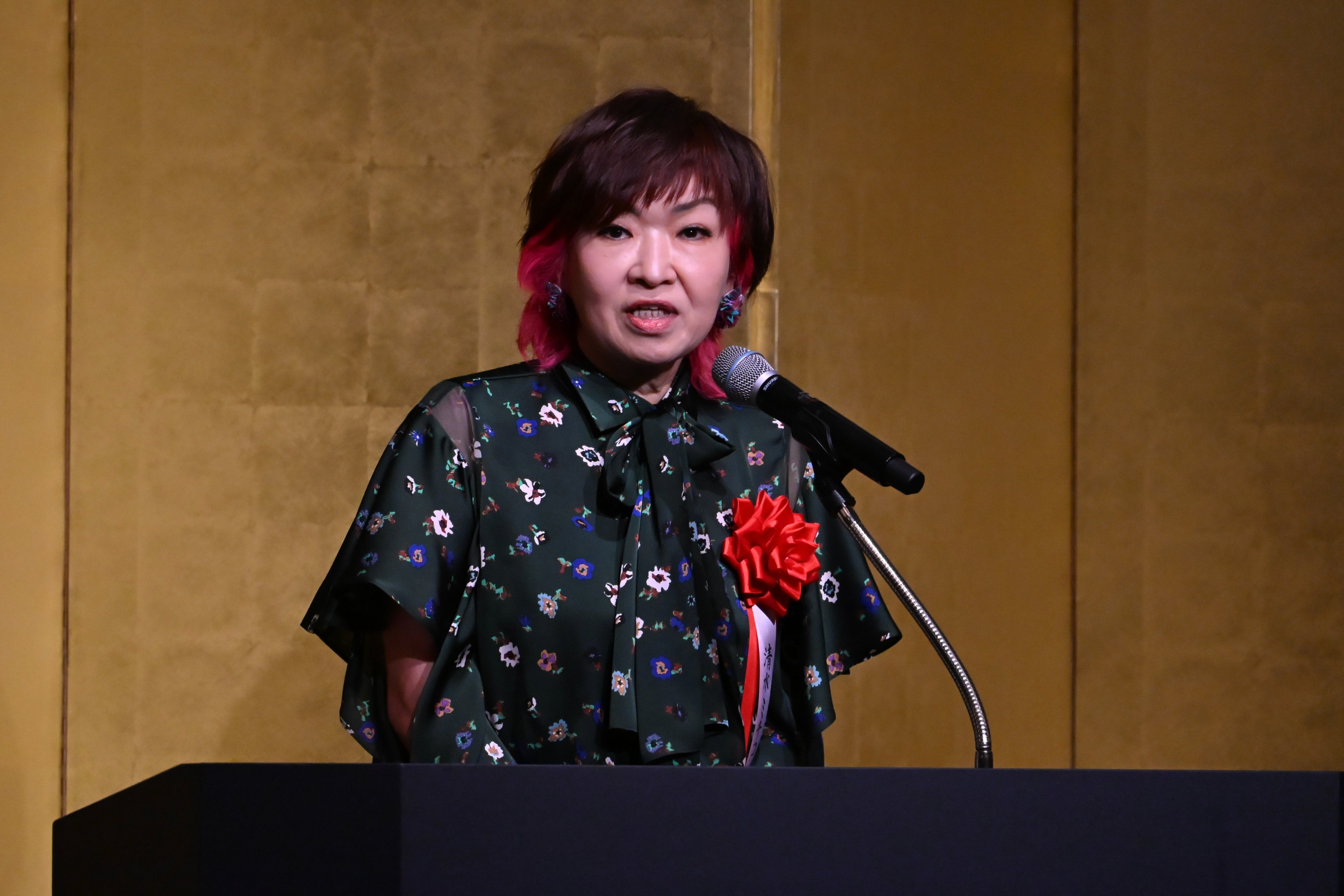
- March 2026
- Born: 27 January 1960 (age 66); Takayama, Gifu, Japan
- Other names: Micchan; Shimichiko
- Education: Bunkyo University Women's College Division of Home Economics
- Occupations: Tarento; comedian; actress; impressionist
- Years active: 1983–
- Agent: Jam House
- Spouse: Yukinobu Sakata (m. 1987)
- Website: Official website

Michiko Shimizu (清水 ミチコ, Shimizu Michiko; born 27 January 1960, in Takayama, Gifu) is a Japanese tarento, comedian, and actress. She is also an impressionist (monomane tarento).

Shimizu's real name is Michiko Sakata (坂田 美智子, Sakata Michiko; née Shimizu (清水)) She is represented with Jam House. Shimizu graduated from Takayama Nishi High School and Bunkyo University Women's College Division of Home Economics.

She is nicknamed Micchan (ミッちゃん) and Shimichiko (シミチコ). Shimizu's catchphrase is Rinjin wa Gei no koyashi (隣人は芸のこやし).

== Impressions ==
- Shinobu Otake
- Yumi Matsutoya
- Kaori Momoi
- Akiko Yano (Note: Shimizu had a duet with Yano for her bonus single "Imomushi gorogoro" from the album Batta mon.)
- Remi Hirano
- Ryoko Moriyama
- Tetsuko Kuroyanagi
- Aya Sugimoto
- Yuriko Koike

== Filmography ==
=== Film ===
Year	Title	Role	Notes	Ref.
2021	Belle	Kita (voice)		
2023	The Forbidden Play	Sachi Murata		
2024	90 Years Old – So What?			
2025	Kaiju Guy!	Mayor		
2027	Akiramemasen!			

=== TV drama ===
Year	Title	Role	Notes	Ref.
2001	Churasan		Asadora	
2016	Sanada Maru	Asahi no kata	Taiga drama	

=== TV variety ===
Year	Title	Notes	Ref.
1996–2021	Meringue no Kimochi	As narrator	

== Discography ==
=== Albums ===
Year	Title	Ref.
1992	Ame to Muchi	
2009	Batta mon	
