= Belle (2021 film) =

Japanese animated film by Mamoru Hosoda

- Theatrical release poster

Japanese name
- Kanji: 竜とそばかすの姫
- Literal meaning: The Dragon and the Freckled Princess
Transcriptions
- Revised Hepburn: Ryū to Sobakasu no Hime
- Directed by: Mamoru Hosoda
- Screenplay by: Mamoru Hosoda
- Story by: Mamoru Hosoda
- Produced by: Nozomu Takahashi; Yuichiro Saito; Toshimi Tanio; Genki Kawamura
- Starring: Kaho Nakamura; Ryō Narita; Shōta Sometani; Tina Tamashiro; Lilas Ikuta; Kōji Yakusho; Takeru Satoh
- Cinematography: Manabu Kadōno; Tetsu Machida; Lee Ju-mi
- Edited by: Shigeru Nishiyama
- Music by: Taisei Iwasaki; Ludvig Forssell; Yuta Bandoh; Miho Hazama; Daiki Tsuneta
- Production company: Studio Chizu
- Distributed by: Toho
- Release dates: July 15, 2021 (Cannes); July 16, 2021 (Japan)
- Running time: 121 minutes
- Country: Japan
- Language: Japanese
- Box office: $64.7 million

Belle (Japanese: 竜とそばかすの姫, Hepburn: Ryū to Sobakasu no Hime; literally The Dragon and the Freckled Princess) is a 2021 Japanese animated musical science fantasy drama film written and directed by Mamoru Hosoda and produced by Studio Chizu. The story is inspired by the 1756 French fairytale Beauty and the Beast by Jeanne-Marie Leprince de Beaumont as well as the 1991 Disney animated film.

Belle had an acclaimed premiere at the 2021 Cannes Film Festival. The film was additionally dubbed into foreign languages (English, Chinese, Norwegian, Portuguese, Spanish, Italian, French, Greek, German and Polish). It was released theatrically in Japan on July 16, 2021. Belle was the third-highest-grossing Japanese film of 2021, accounting for ¥6.53 billion in box-office rankings as of December 12, 2021.

== Plot ==
Suzu Naito is a third-year high school student living in the rural Kōchi Prefecture of Japan, with a lost passion for singing and songwriting. As a child, Suzu witnessed her mother rescue a girl from a flooding river at the cost of her own life and thus resents her for "abandoning" her for a stranger's child. Suzu remains in contact with a group of older choir teachers who were her mother's friends but is alienated from most of her classmates, except her childhood crush and self-appointed protector Shinobu Hisatake, popular girl Ruka Watanabe, sportsman Shinjiro "Kamishin" Chikami, and her genius best friend Hiroka "Hiro" Betsuyaku.

At Hiro's insistence, Suzu signs into the popular virtual world "U" and is appointed a beautiful avatar with freckles (through the AI engine's biometric analysis), whom she names "Bell", the English translation of her own name. Upon logging in, she finds herself capable of singing again. With the assistance of Hiro, who appoints herself Bell's manager and producer, Bell becomes a hit on U's music charts, and people start referring to her as "Belle", meaning "beautiful" in French.

During one of Belle's concerts, an infamously strong and near-unbeatable user, "The Dragon" (or "The Beast"), arrives, fleeing from the Justices, a vigilante group led by the self-righteous Justin, who fight the Dragon and accuse him of disturbing the peace of U. Justin plans to unveil the Dragon's identity to the public using a specialized program mostly reserved for U's owners. Intrigued by the Dragon, Suzu begins to gather information about him. She discovers that he is popular amongst children, who consider him to be their hero. She meets the Dragon and his five guardians AIs. Belle and the Dragon grow close. In the real world, Ruka confides to Suzu that she has a crush on Kamishin. Suzu helps the two confess their feelings.

In U, Justin captures and interrogates Belle, threatening to unveil her identity to the world if she refuses to cooperate. The Dragon's AIs rescue Belle, but their intervention allows Justin and his group to locate the Dragon's castle and burn it down. The Dragon flees before Belle can find him. Suzu and Hiro work to find out the Dragon's real identity before Justin can and warn him. They find out the Dragon is a third-year junior high school student named Kei who is being physically and verbally abused by his father; Kei's protectiveness over his younger brother, Tomo is what gives the Dragon his unbeatable strength in U. Suzu contacts Kei offering help, but Kei does not believe that she is Belle, and generally distrusts everyone who offers him help, since nobody has ever followed through. Shinobu, Ruka, Kamishin, and the choir teachers reveal their knowledge of Belle's true identity and urge Suzu to sing to gain Kei's trust. Suzu unveils herself to the world in the U and sings. Tomo convinces Kei to trust her and they try to contact her again. When Kei's father sees that evidence of his abuse has been posted online, he terminates their internet connection before Kei can tell Suzu their address.

Using context clues, Ruka and Kamishin deduce that Kei's hometown is Kawasaki, Kanagawa, near Tokyo. Since authorities cannot intervene on abuse charges until 48 hours have passed, Suzu locates Kei and Tomo on her own and protects them from their father, who cowers after she fearlessly stares him down, before Kei and Tomo thank her for coming to their aid. The next day, she and her father warmly greet each other at the station. Shinobu praises Suzu for her bravery and deciding she no longer needs his protection, finally feels free to pursue the relationship he has always wanted with her. Finally understanding her mother's selfless actions, Suzu makes peace with her death.

== Voice cast ==
Character	Cast		Summary
Character	Japanese	English	Summary
Suzu Naito / Belle	Kaho Nakamura	Kylie McNeill	A third-year high school student who lost the will to sing after the death of her mother. She is known as Belle in U.
Kei / Dragon	Takeru Satoh	Paul Castro Jr.	A third-year middle school student who is being abused by his father. He is known as the Beast in U.
Tomo / Angel	HANA	Bentley Griffin	Kei's innocent and frail younger brother. He is known as the Angel in U.
Hiroka "Hiro-chan" Betsuyaku	Lilas Ikuta	Jessica DiCicco	Suzu's best friend and manager of her identity as Belle.
Suzu's father	Kōji Yakusho	Ben Lepley	Suzu's widowed father whom she feels distant from.
Shinobu Hisatake	Ryo Narita	Manny Jacinto	Suzu's crush since elementary school.
Shinjiro "Kamishin" Chikami	Shota Sometani	Brandon Engman	Suzu's friend who has a passion for canoeing.
Ruka Watanabe	Tina Tamashiro	Hunter Schafer	The popular girl in Suzu's class.
Justin	Toshiyuki Morikawa	Chace Crawford	The leader of the Justices, a group of corps that are proclaiming themselves the unofficial protectors of justice and order within the virtual online space of "U".
Okumoto	Fuyumi Sakamoto	Ellyn Stern	
Jellinek	Kenjiro Tsuda	Andrew Kishino	
Swan	Mami Koyama	Noelle McGrath	
Muitarō Hitokawa / Tokoraemaru	Mamoru Miyano	David Chen	
Kita	Michiko Shimizu	Jessica Gee George	
Yoshitani	Ryoko Moriyama	Barbara Goodson	
Hatanaka	Sachiyo Nakao	Martha Harms	
Nakai	Yoshimi Iwasaki	Wendee Lee	
Suzu's mother	Sumi Shimamoto	Julie Nathanson	
Kei and Tomo's Father/Kakeshi Kun	Ken Ishiguro	Kiff VandenHeuvel	
Peggie Sue	ermhoi	Cristina Vee	

== Production ==
While Studio Chizu worked on the project, they had help from veteran Disney animator and character designer Jin Kim and Michael Camacho on the design of Belle and studio Cartoon Saloon for the background work of the world of U, whose concept illustration was designed and created by London-based up-and-coming architect/designer, Eric Wong.

Hosoda initially intended for Belle to be a musical, but considered the idea difficult due to Japan not having a culture of making musicals. However, he still wanted music to be central to the film, so he searched for a protagonist who could sing. He stated that he preferred the same person doing both speaking and singing voices to make it convincing and searched for a singer who could express their feelings through song and move people, even if they don't understand Japanese. He then found Kaho Nakamura, whom he considered relatively unknown, but a perfect choice for the role. Hosoda stated that Nakamura was also involved in writing lyrics, so she could feel the lyrics she was singing.

== Release ==
GKIDS acquired North American distribution rights in June 2021, and released the film theatrically with a nationwide release date of January 14, 2022, and previews in select IMAX theaters on January 12,

Sale rights to the film outside Japan were handled by French company Charades who pre-sold the rights internationally, including Kismet in Australia and New Zealand, Anime Limited in the UK, Ireland and France (with Wild Bunch), and Koch Media in Italy and German-speaking territories. The deal size was due to the popularity of Japanese anime and the international status of Mamoru Hosoda.

== Music ==
The music for the series was composed by Taisei Iwasaki, Ludvig Forssell, and Yuta Bandoh. The soundtrack album was released on August 18, 2021, by Ariola Japan.

== Reception ==
=== Box office ===
Belle is the third-highest-grossing Japanese film of 2021, accounting for ¥6.53 billion in box-office rakings as of December 12, 2021.

In the film's U.S. opening weekend it made $1.6 million from 1,326 theaters, and a total of $1.8 million over the four-day Martin Luther King Day holiday frame. The film dropped out of the box office top ten in its second weekend with $570,213. The film was released on May 17, 2022, on DVD & Blu-ray by GKids (through its distribution partner Shout! Factory).

=== Critical response ===
On the review aggregator website Rotten Tomatoes, 95% of 130 critics' reviews are positive. The website's consensus reads: "A remarkable story brought to life with dazzling animation, Belle finds writer-director Mamoru Hosoda setting a brilliant new benchmark." Metacritic, which uses a weighted average, assigned the film a score of 83 out of 100, based on 31 critics, indicating "universal acclaim". American audiences polled by PostTrak gave the film an 86% positive score, with 63% saying they would definitely recommend it.

At the 2021 Cannes Film Festival, the film received a 14-minute-standing ovation. Joe Morgenstern wrote for The Wall Street Journal that "There's too much plot for the film to manage, but its heart, and sumptuous art, are so firmly in the right place that its appeal comes through sweet and clear." Manohla Dargis of The New York Times praised the visual quality, character development, worldbuilding, and called the film "unfailingly touching." Justin Chang of the Los Angeles Times praised the visuals and story, writing "It's a tale as old as time and as newfangled as TikTok, in which the virtual world, though packed with fantasy and artifice, can bring startling truths to the surface."

=== Accolades ===
The film has received five Annie Award nominations, including one for Best Independent Animated Feature. Its total makes it the second most nominations for a Japanese anime film ever at the awards, tied with Ghost in the Shell (1995), and behind Suzume (2022) and The Boy and the Heron (2023).

Award	Date of ceremony	Category	Recipient(s)	Result	Ref.
Sitges Film Festival	October 6, 2021	Best Feature	Belle	Nominated	
Sitges Film Festival	October 6, 2021	Grand Honorary Award	Mamoru Hosoda	Won	
Locarno Festival	August 9, 2021	Locarno Festival Kids Award	Belle, Mamoru Hosoda	Won	
Animation Is Film Festival	October 26, 2021	Special Jury Prize	Belle	Won	
Fancine	November 18, 2021	Best Feature Film	Belle	Nominated	
Fancine	November 18, 2021	Best Sound Design	Belle	Won	
Fancine	November 18, 2021	Public's Choice Award For Best Feature Film	Belle	Won	
Fancine	November 18, 2021	Gato Rabioso Award	Belle	Won	
Utopiales	November 30, 2021	Cinema International Feature Film Competition Jury Prize	Belle	Won	
Detroit Film Critics Society	December 6, 2021	Best Animated Feature	Belle	Nominated	
Chicago Film Critics Association	December 15, 2021	Best Animated Feature	Belle	Nominated	
Chicago Film Critics Association	December 15, 2021	Audience Award Best Feature	Belle	Won	
Hawaii International Film Festival	December 3, 2021	Audience Award Best Feature	Belle	Won	
Los Angeles Film Critics Association Awards	December 18, 2021	Best Animated Film	Belle	Runner-up	
New Mexico Film Critics	December 21, 2021	Best Animated Feature	Belle	Runner-up	
Florida Film Critics Circle	December 22, 2021	Best Animated Feature	Belle	Nominated	
San Francisco Bay Area Film Critics Circle	January 10, 2022	Best Animated Feature	Belle	Nominated	
Austin Film Critics Association	January 11, 2022	Best Animated Film	Belle	Nominated	
Austin Film Critics Association	January 11, 2022	Best Voice Acting/Animated/Digital Performance	Kaho Nakamura	Nominated	
Crunchyroll Anime Awards	February 9, 2022	Best Film	Belle	Nominated	
Gold Open	February 23, 2022	Gold List Best Animation Feature	Belle	Honorable Mention (Note: Tied with the film Flee)	
VFX-Japan Awards	March 3, 2022	Excellence Award - Animated Theatrical Film Category	Belle	Won	
Japan Academy Film Prize	March 11, 2022	Animation of the Year	Belle	Nominated	
Japan Academy Film Prize	March 11, 2022	Outstanding Achievement in Music	Taisei Iwasaki, Ludvig Forssell, Yuta Bandoh	Won	
Annie Awards	March 12, 2022	Best Animated Feature — Independent	Belle	Nominated	
Annie Awards	March 12, 2022	Outstanding Achievement for Animated Effects in an Animated Production	Ryo Horibe, Yohei Shimozawa	Nominated	
Annie Awards	March 12, 2022	Outstanding Achievement for Directing in an Animated Feature Production	Mamoru Hosoda	Nominated	
Annie Awards	March 12, 2022	Outstanding Achievement for Writing in an Animated Feature Production	Mamoru Hosoda	Nominated	
Annie Awards	March 12, 2022	Outstanding Achievement for Production Design in an Animated Feature Production	Tomm Moore, Ross Stewart, Alice Dieudonné, Almu Redondo, Maria Pareja	Nominated	
Anifilm	May 18, 2022	The Best Feature Film for Children	Belle	Won	
Cartoons on the Bay	June 4, 2022	Best Writing Award	Belle	Won	
Animafest Zagreb	July 9, 2022	Best Animated Feature	Belle	Nominated	
Uruguayan Film Critics Association	December 16, 2022	Best Animated Feature	Belle	Won	
Golden Tomatoes Award 2022	January 13, 2023	Best Animated Movies	Belle	6th place	
Golden Tomatoes Award 2022	January 13, 2023	Best Foreign-Language Movies	Belle	9th place	
Golden Tomatoes Award 2022	January 13, 2023	Best Wide Release Movies	Belle	13th place	

=== Cultural influence ===
After the release of the film, Ochi in Kōchi Prefecture, which served as the prototype for filming, was certified by the Anime Tourism Association as one of the "88 Japanese Anime Mecca I Want to Visit". The Kochi Prefectural Tourism Bureau plans movie sightseeing routes to attract tourists with movie locations.

Belle was included in a high school art textbook released in Japan as a teaching example of animation production, and passed the audit of Ministry of Education, Culture, Sports, Science and Technology in March 2023. This art textbook was used in high schools starting in 2024.
