= Kaho Nakamura =

Japanese singer-songwriter and voice actress

- 中村佳穂
- Born: May 26, 1992 (age 34); Kyoto Prefecture, Japan
- Occupations: Singer-songwriter; voice actress
- Musical career
- Genres: J-pop
- Instrument: Vocals
- Years active: 2012–present
- Label: Ainou
- Website: nakamurakaho.com

Kaho Nakamura (中村佳穂, Nakamura Kaho; born May 26, 1992) is a Japanese singer-songwriter and voice actress. She released her debut EP, Kuchi Utsushi Romance (口うつしロマンス), in 2014 and is best known as the voice of Suzu Naito in Belle.

== Career ==
Nakamura's debut EP, Kuchi Utsushi Romance (口うつしロマンス), was released on May 31, 2014. Her first studio album, Repeat ga Tatsu (リピー塔がたつ) was released on July 2, 2016, followed by her first single, "Doko Made" (どこまで), on March 22, 2017, and her second studio album, Ainou, on November 7, 2018. In 2021, Nakamura debuted as a voice actress in the animated science fantasy film Belle as the main character Suzu Naito. She released her third studio album, Nia, on March 23, 2022. In May 2022, she featured on the song "Reflection" from the Tofubeats album of the same name.

== Discography ==
=== Studio albums ===
Title	Album details	Peak positions	
Title	Album details	JPN Oricon	JPN Billboard
Repeat ga Tatsu (リピー塔がたつ)	Released: July 2, 2016	—	—
Ainou	Released: November 7, 2018; Label: Ainou; Formats: CD, digital download	64	97
Nia	Released: March 23, 2022; Label: Ainou; Formats: CD, digital download	23	24

=== Extended plays ===
Title	Album details
Kuchi Utsushi Romance (口うつしロマンス)	Released: May 31, 2014

=== Singles ===
Title	Year	Album
"Doko Made" (どこまで)	2017	Non-album single

== Filmography ==
=== Animated films ===
List of voice performances in films
Year	Title	Role	Source
2021	Belle	Suzu Naito / Belle	

== Awards and nominations ==
Year	Award	Category	Result	Refs
2021	Austin Film Critics Association Awards	Best Voice Acting/Animated/Digital Performance	Nominated	
