= Shigeyuki Miya =

Japanese animator, director, storyboard artist

- 宮繁之
- Born: November 14, 1975 (age 50); Shizuoka Prefecture, Japan
- Other name: Saraichito (更一灯)
- Occupations: television director; animator
- Years active: 1999–present

Shigeyuki Miya (宮繁之, Miya Shigeyuki; born November 14, 1975) is a Japanese animator, storyboard artist and director.

== Biography ==
Shigeyuki Miya was born on November 14, 1975, in Shizuoka Prefecture, Japan. He began his career as a producer at Studio Deen in 1999 where he began learning about animation. Initially planning on following the family tradition of teaching, Miya turned to animation after fellow animator and director, Kazuhiro Furuhashi, asked him to provide animation for the 1996 anime series Ruroni Kenshin, a series Furuhashi was directing at Studio Deen.

Miya began drawing his first storyboards during the production of TMS Entertainment's anime series Requiem from the Darkness in 2003 where he also served as a character designer after being approached by the producer of the series, Hiromichi Ōishi. Miya had his directorial debut with the 17th Lupin III television special titled Angel Tactics that was released in 2005.

He continued his directorial work on the adaptation of Takehiko Inoue's manga series Buzzer Beater where he also provided character designs. The series ran for two seasons from 2005 to 2007. In 2009, he joined Madhouse's production of the series Aoi Bungaku that adapted classic Japanese literature. Miya was in charge of directing and providing character designs for episodes based on Natsume Sōseki's novel Kokoro. In 2013, Miya directed the Brain's Base adaptation of Yuuki Kodama's manga series Blood Lad which ran for 13 episodes. In 2014, Miya returned to Brain's Base to direct The Kawai Complex Guide to Manors and Hostel Behavior anime television series based on Ruri Miyahara's manga series of the same name that ran for 12 episodes. Miya is directing, along with Tomomi Kamiya, Production I.G's television adaptation of Naoya Matsumoto's manga series Kaiju No. 8. The anime premiered on April 13, 2024.

Miya uses a pen name Saraichito (更一灯) in productions where he had a supplementary role to give more attention to staff working on a project.

== Works ==
=== TV series ===
- Requiem from the Darkness (2003) – Character design
- Lupin III: Angel Tactics (2005) – Director
- Buzzer Beater (2005-2007) – Director, character design
- Rusuden Hour: Sodan Brothers (2005) – Director
- Aoi Bungaku (2009) – Director, character design (Kokoro)
- Blood Lad (2013) – Director
- The Kawai Complex Guide to Manors and Hostel Behavior (2014) – Director
- Onihei (2017) – Director, character design
- Afterlost (2019) – Director
- Kaiju No. 8 (2024) – Director

=== OVAs ===
- Lupin III: Green Vs. Red (2008) – Director
- Supernatural: The Anime Series (2011) – Co-directed with Atsuko Ishizuka
