= Yuta Bandoh =

Japanese composer (born 1991)

- 坂東 祐大
- Born: January 25, 1991 (age 35); Osaka, Japan
- Other names: Taku Matsushiba (松司馬拓)
- Education: Tokyo University of the Arts
- Occupation: Composer
- Spouse: Yumi Fuzuki (m. 2023)
- Website: yutabandoh.com

Yuta Bandoh (Japanese: 坂東 祐大, Hepburn: Bandō Yūta; born January 25, 1991), also known as Taku Matsushiba (松司馬拓), is a Japanese composer. He is best known for his work on Belle (2021), Yuri on Ice (2016), Kaiju No. 8 (2024), and Poupelle of Chimney Town (2020), as well as his collaborations with Kenshi Yonezu. Bandoh won the 45th Japan Academy Film Prize for Outstanding Achievement in Music for his work on Belle.

== Early and personal life ==
Bandoh was born in Osaka in 1991. Due to his father's work, he moved frequently in his childhood before settling in Saitama in fourth grade of elementary school. He began playing the piano when he was three years old. When he was a child, he wanted to become either an architect or a film director. In sixth grade of elementary school, his piano teacher encouraged him to become a composer.

In February 2024, Bandoh announced that he had married poet Yumi Fuzuki in July 2023.

== Education and career ==
Bandoh attended the affiliated music high school of Tokyo University of the Arts before studying composition there. He subsequently attended their graduate school.

He composed the theme song "Voices" for Hōdō Station in 2021. In October 2022, he held his first solo exhibition at Hamarikyu Asahi Hall.

== Selected works ==
=== Film ===
Year	Title	Notes	Ref.
2018	It Comes	Lead composer	
2020	Poupelle of Chimney Town	With Youki Kojima	
2021	Belle	Belle Original Soundtrack with Taisei Iwasaki and Ludvig Forssell	
2026	Look Back	Lead composer	
2026	Sheep in the Box	Lead composer	

=== Television ===
Year	Title	Notes	Ref.
2016	Yuri on Ice	As Taku Matsushiba, with Taro Umebayashi	
2021	My Dear Exes		
2022	Teen Regime	Mini-series; with Tomggg, Ryo Maekubo, and Shohei Amimori	
2024	Kaiju No. 8		

=== Music ===
Year	Title	Artist	Notes
2020	"Kite"	Arashi	Arrangement; with Kenshi Yonezu
2021	"Beautiful World (Da Capo Version)"	Hikaru Utada	String arrangement, conducting
2021	"Pale Blue"	Kenshi Yonezu	Co-arranged with Yonezu
2023	"Tsuki Wo Miteita – Moongazing"	Kenshi Yonezu	For Final Fantasy XVI; co-arranged with Yonezu
2023	"Spinning Globe"	Kenshi Yonezu	For The Boy and the Heron; co-produced with Yonezu

== Awards ==
Year	Award	Category	Nominee(s) or Work(s)	Result	Ref.
2014	83rd Japan Music Competition	Composition (Orchestral Works)	Yuta Bandoh	3rd place	
2015	25th Akutagawa Composition Award	—N/a	Damier & Mismatch J.H:S	Won	
2018	Japan Expo Awards	Best Soundtrack	Taro Umebayashi and Taku Matsushiba for Yuri on Ice	Nominated	
2022	45th Japan Academy Film Prize	Outstanding Achievement in Music	Taisei Iwasaki, Ludvig Forssell, and Yuta Bandoh for Belle	Won	
2022	49th Annie Awards	Outstanding Achievement for Music in a Feature Production	Youki Kojima and Yuta Bandoh for Poupelle of Chimney Town	Nominated	
2023	18th AnimaniA Awards	Best Anime Score	Taisei Iwasaki, Ludvig Forssell, and Yuta Bandoh for Belle	Won	
