= Bunkyo University Women's College =

- 文教大学女子短期大学部
- Type: private
- Active: 1953–2012
- Location: Chigasaki, Kanagawa, Japan
- Website: https://www.bunkyo.ac.jp/faculty/buwc/index.html

Bunkyo University Women's College (文教大学女子短期大学部, Bunkyo Daigaku Joshi Tanki Daigakubu) was a private junior college in Chigasaki, Kanagawa, Japan. It was established in 1953. In 1985, the campus was moved to Chigasaki, Kanagawa from Shinagawa, Tokyo. The college was abolished in 2011.

== See also ==
- List of junior colleges in Japan
