= Kaiju No. 8 =

Japanese manga series

- First tankōbon volume cover, featuring Kafka Hibino in his kaiju form

怪獣8号 (Kaijū Hachigō)
- Genre: Adventure; Science fantasy
- Manga
- Written by: Naoya Matsumoto
- Published by: Shueisha
- English publisher: NA: Viz Media
- Imprint: Jump Comics+
- Magazine: Shōnen Jump+
- Original run: July 3, 2020 – July 18, 2025
- Volumes: 16
- Light novel

Kaiju No. 8: Exclusive on the Third Division
- Written by: Keiji Andō
- Illustrated by: Naoya Matsumoto
- Published by: Shueisha
- English publisher: NA: Viz Media
- Imprint: Jump J-Books
- Published: November 4, 2022
- Manga

Kaiju No. 8: B-Side
- Written by: Keiji Andō
- Illustrated by: Kentaro Hidano
- Published by: Shueisha
- English publisher: NA: Viz Media
- Imprint: Jump Comics+
- Magazine: Shōnen Jump+
- Original run: January 5, 2024 – July 12, 2024
- Volumes: 2
- Anime television series
- Directed by: Shigeyuki Miya; Tomomi Kamiya (S1)
- Written by: Ichirō Ōkouchi (S1); Yūichirō Kido (S2)
- Music by: Yuta Bandoh
- Studio: Production I.G
- Licensed by: Crunchyroll; SEA: Medialink
- Original network: TXN (TV Tokyo)
- Original run: April 13, 2024 – September 27, 2025
- Episodes: 23
- Manga

Kaiju No. 8 Relax
- Written by: Kizuku Watanabe
- Published by: Shueisha
- English publisher: NA: Viz Media
- Magazine: Saikyō Jump
- Original run: June 4, 2024 – present
- Volumes: 5
- Original net animation

Kaiju No. 8 Narumi's Weekday
- Directed by: Shigeyuki Miya
- Music by: Yuta Bandoh
- Studio: Production I.G
- Licensed by: Crunchyroll; SEA: Medialink
- Released: September 5, 2026 – September 26, 2026
- Episodes: 4
- Anime film

Kaiju No. 8: The Final Mission
- Directed by: Shigeyuki Miya
- Studio: Production I.G
- Released: 2027
- icon

Kaiju No. 8 (Japanese: 怪獣8号, Hepburn: Kaijū Hachigō), also known in English as Monster #8, is a Japanese web manga series written and illustrated by Naoya Matsumoto. It was serialized on Shueisha's Shōnen Jump+ app and website from July 2020 to July 2025, with its chapters collected in 16 tankōbon volumes. Shueisha has also published the series digitally on its Manga Plus platform in English and several other languages. Viz Media began publishing the series digitally in August 2020 and has published the series in print in North America since December 2021.

The story follows Kafka Hibino who, after ingesting a parasitic creature, gains the ability to turn into a kaiju and now must navigate using his power while trying to become part of an organization that eliminates kaiju to fulfill a promise he made with a childhood friend. Matsumoto wrote the outline of the story of Kaiju No. 8 near the end of 2018 making it his second series for the magazine. The series was heavily influenced by Japanese tokusatsu media, especially Ultraman, while the author's struggles in the manga industry served as a basis for the main character's backstory.

An anime television series adaptation produced by Production I.G aired from April to June 2024, with a second season aired from July to September 2025. A concluding anime film, Kaiju No. 8: The Final Mission, is set to be released in 2027. The series has spawned a light novel, two spin-off manga series, and a video game.

By September 2026, the manga had over 20 million copies in circulation. The series has been praised for its premise, characters, and art. The series won the Next Manga Award in the web manga category in 2021 and was nominated for the Eisner Award in 2022.

== Synopsis ==
=== Setting ===
Kaiju No. 8 is set in a world in which monsters named kaiju regularly cause disasters. Japan has the highest rate of kaiju attacks in the world, therefore in order to combat them it establishes the Japanese Anti-Kaiju Defense Force (JAKDF). (Note: Nihon bōei-tai (日本防衛隊; lit. 'Japanese Defense Force')) Kaiju are assigned a "fortitude level"—a scale indicating their overall strength, and are classified as honju—more dangerous, stronger kaiju, and yoju—smaller kaiju that can accompany or sprout off from honju. Kaiju that have high fortitude levels or abnormal characteristics are given a number as an identifier based on when they first appear, and are classified as daikaiju.

Defense Force officers wear powered suits made from kaiju remains that grant them increased strength, speed, and durability. The suits have a total power output, measured in the form of a percentage (referred to as "unleashed combat power"), which varies from person to person (depending on their ability), with a maximum of 100%. The suits also influence how strong an officer's weapons are.

Daikaiju remains are used to create stronger weapons named Numbers (ナンバーズ, Nanbāzu) that are named after the daikaiju they are made from, but only a select few can use them if they are deemed compatible. Numbers weapons are much stronger than regular suits and provide their users with special abilities. The Defense Force consists of field officers led by platoon leaders, with varying levels of unleashed combat power, and captains and vice-captains whose combat power exceeds 90% and who lead divisions. Field officers are supported by a team of operators who provide information on kaiju, and monitor the field officers' health and suit output.

=== Plot ===
Following the destruction of their hometown by a kaiju, childhood friends Kafka Hibino and Mina Ashiro vow to join the Japanese Anti-Kaiju Defense Force. Mina ascends to become captain of the Third Division, renowned for her uniquely destructive marksmanship, while Kafka repeatedly fails the entrance exam and works on a cleanup crew disposing of kaiju remains. His resolve is renewed upon meeting Reno Ichikawa, a young coworker and fellow aspirant to the Defense Force. A parasitic creature subsequently enters Kafka's body, granting him the ability to transform into a humanoid kaiju. Designated "Kaiju No. 8", Kafka escapes military custody and enlists in the Defense Force, concealing his powerful alter ego.

Kafka and Reno pass the entrance examination and are assigned to the Third Division alongside Kikoru Shinomiya, a prodigious kaiju slayer. During their first mission, they confront another humanoid kaiju, "Kaiju No. 9", which Kafka fails to eliminate. He is later forced to reveal his kaiju form to save the Tachikawa base from destruction during an attack by "Kaiju No. 10". Apprehended by Mina, Kafka is taken to Defense Force headquarters. He proves his value by defeating the Director General, Isao Shinomiya, in a duel. Kafka and Kikoru are then transferred to the First Division, led by Captain Gen Narumi.

No. 9 attacks Shinagawa, and while two of its duplicates are destroyed, the genuine entity confronts and absorbs Isao Shinomiya, acquiring his Numbers 2 weapon, a powered suit of armor derived from Kaiju No. 2. Empowered, No. 9 escapes to prepare a full-scale invasion of Japan. In preparation, Kafka and Kikoru undergo intensive training; Kikoru inherits her mother's Numbers 4 weapon, while Reno acquires the Numbers 6 weapon and trains with the Fourth Division. During his own training with Vice-Captain Soshiro Hoshina at a shrine commemorating kaiju slayers of the Meireki era, Kafka perceives a spectral vision of an ancient warrior.

Months later, the invasion begins with kaiju designated Nos. 11 through 15 attacking specific Defense Force members. Gen, Soshiro, Kafka, and Kikoru defeat their assigned opponents, with Mina being the last to prevail. No. 9 uses the corpse of Kaiju No. 14 to teleport to Mina's location, intending to kill and absorb her to acquire her destructive power. Kafka reaches her in time with Reno's assistance. Together, Kafka and Mina defeat No. 9, but its corpse mortally wounds Kafka and is subsequently taken over by an ancient, powerful kaiju from the Meireki era that it had absorbed. This entity, Meireki, easily overpowers the remaining defenders.

The larval kaiju manifests in Kafka's mind and reveals it is a parasitic core born from the warriors Meireki slew, who were also responsible for the Great Fire of Meireki (and thus the spirit he saw earlier). Saddened by the turn of events, it offers Kafka a choice: restoration of his human heart or transformation into a new core, permanently reviving him as Kaiju No. 8. Choosing to fight, Kafka revives as a Kaiju in a stronger form and, alongside Soshiro and Gen, confronts Meireki, who resurrects previous kaiju to battle them. Kafka, Kikoru, and Mina ultimately defeat Meireki, with Kafka delivering the final blow. After the battle, Kafka's health deteriorates, but he recovers from a four-month coma. His heart is restored by the spirit of Isao Shinomiya, who entrusts him with the future.

He returns to active duty at the Tachikawa base, welcomed by his comrades. A year later, Kikoru is promoted to vice-captain of the First Division, and Kafka is appointed platoon leader of the Third Division in recognition of his service. The Defense Force permits him to use his kaiju form when necessary, provided he exercises caution to remain undetected.

== Production ==
Matsumoto had always loved tokusatsu, and he particularly liked the protagonist archetype seen often in the genre—where individuals gain extraordinary abilities, and become a hero, but also bear the weight of inner struggle as a consequence.

— Shōnen Jump+ editor-in-chief Seijiro Nakaji on Naoya Matsumoto's tokusatsu influences.

Naoya Matsumoto began his career in 2006 with Neko Romancer, published in Jump Giga (then known as Akamaru Jump). He authored Nekowappa!, which debuted in Shueisha's Weekly Shōnen Jump in 2009. The series continued a one-shot from the JG1 One-Shot festival. He published another one-shot, Shikai Enbu, in the 2012 spring edition of Jump Giga (then Jump Next), before starting his second serialization, Pochi Kuro, on Shueisha's Shōnen Jump+ website and application in 2014.

Near the end of 2018, Matsumoto presented the initial story idea and outline for Kaiju No. 8 to Shōnen Jump+ deputy editor-in-chief Seijiro Nakaji. Influenced by tokusatsu media such as the Ultraman series—particularly Ultraseven (1967)—as well as Shin Godzilla (2016) and Pacific Rim (2013), Matsumoto aimed to create a story about a protagonist who pursues a goal while concealing their identity from a hostile organization they have joined, which he considered an entertaining concept. The premise of Kafka joining the Defense Force to fulfill his dreams was established early in development, though initial plans involved him maintaining a secret identity while living a normal life. Kafka's predicament was partly inspired by Matsumoto's own career struggles in the manga industry. Working on Kaiju No. 8 was challenging for Matsumoto but allowed him to depart from his typical stories; Nakaji noted the concept was unexpected, as Matsumoto had previously authored fantasy series.

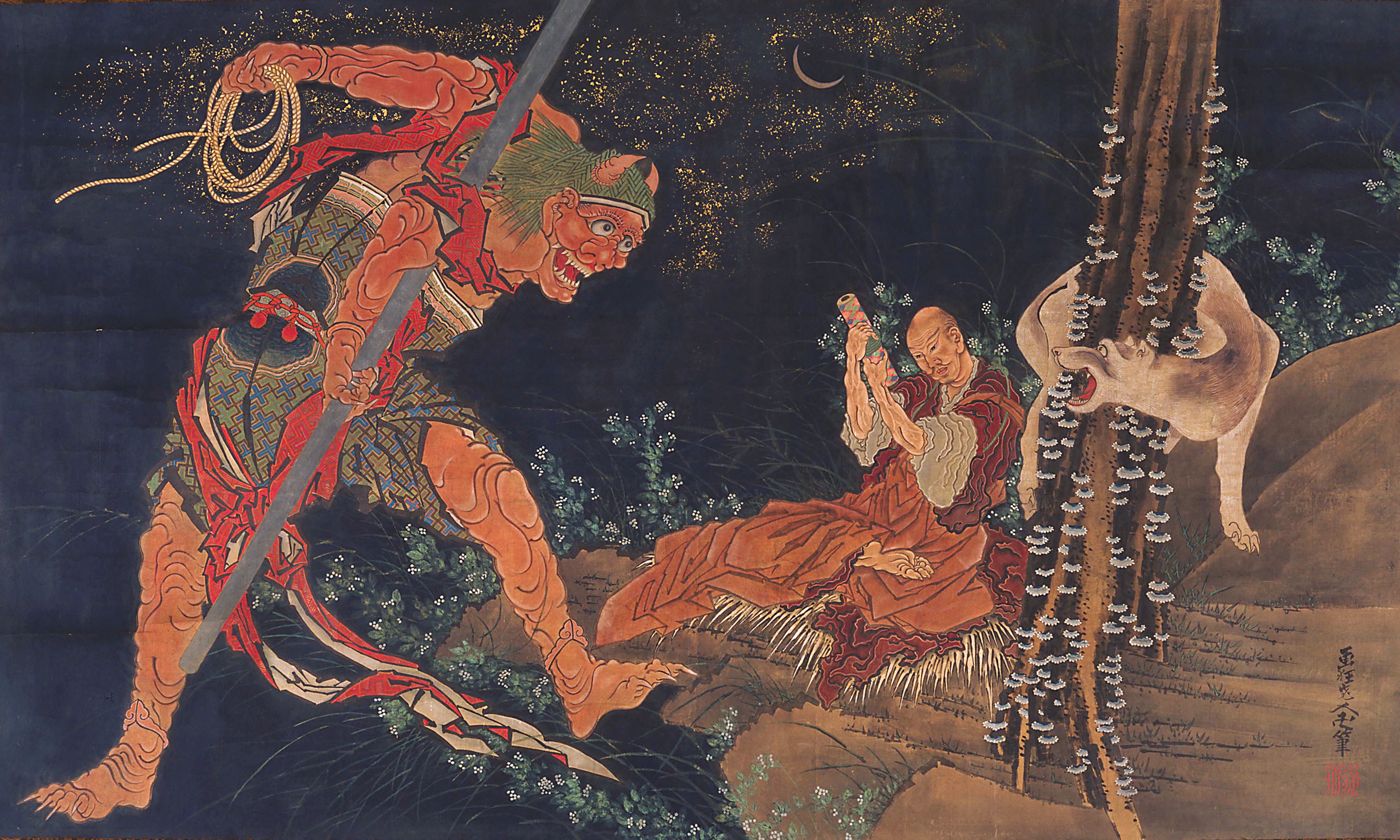
Depictions of oni inspired Kafka's monster design.

The page layouts were designed for clarity, particularly on smartphones, due to the manga's digital release. Nakaji cited a fully colored panel in the second chapter as an example of utilizing the digital format in a way not feasible in a physical magazine. A coworker suggested the kaiju codenames be based on typhoon categorization to enhance their portrayal as disasters. The kaiju designs drew from mythological creatures, animals, and plants. Kaiju No. 8's design was modeled after oni, with its color scheme inspired by the film Tron (1982).

Matsumoto worked with three assistants: Osamu Koiwai, responsible for background art; Jiro Sakura, who handled finishing work; and Mantohihi Binta, credited with weapon design. For background art, Matsumoto provided a storyboard with panel compositions to Koiwai, who created a draft for approval before finalizing the art, a process taking three to four days. Koiwai shared his creative process for the series on YouTube.

In August 2020, Kaiju No. 8 adopted a schedule of three weekly chapters followed by a one-week break. From June 25, 2021, the series switched to a biweekly schedule.

=== Anime adaptation ===
Production I.G producer Masashi Ohira brought Tetsuya Nishio onto the project as character designer and chief animation director, believing Nishio's designs facilitated animation and possessed a three-dimensional quality. Nishio designed the human characters and humanoid kaiju. In addition to serving as chief kaiju designer, Mahiro Maeda provided detailed imagery of kaiju anatomy for battle scenes. Ohira recruited Shinji Kimura as art director for his ability to create a realistic setting. Toho Animation producer Katsuhiro Takei stated that Production I.G and studio Khara were selected due to similarities between Kaiju No. 8 and their previous works. He noted the series' focus on daily life resembled Production I.G's Patlabor (1989), while its setting evoked Khara's Neon Genesis Evangelion (1995). Involving both studios aimed to recreate the aesthetic of 1990s anime.

The anime combined hand-drawn and 3D animation. Lead 3D animation director Masaru Matsumoto worked with a small team using Autodesk 3ds Max and Blender; production began in March 2022 and continued during the broadcast. Directors Tomomi Kamiya and Shigeyuki Miya identified sequences requiring 3D animation during storyboarding, while Kimura and mechanical designer Shinobu Tsuneki collaborated with the team to evoke the aesthetics of Production I.G films like Patlabor and Ghost in the Shell (1995), emphasizing realistic military combat. Extensive 3D animation was used for battles against numerous monsters and for dynamic camera work in action sequences. Studio Khara, in collaboration with the creative agency WOW, produced the opening sequence. Directed by Hibiki Yoshizaki with Kouhei Nakama as CG director, the sequence aimed to depict the origin of the kaiju.

== Media ==
=== Manga ===
Written and illustrated by Naoya Matsumoto, Kaiju No. 8 started on Shueisha's Shōnen Jump+ app and website on July 3, 2020. The series ended with the release of its 129th chapter on July 18, 2025. Shueisha has collected its chapters into individual tankōbon volumes. The first volume was released on December 4, 2020; a promotional video for the volume, presented as a news program, was shown on the big screen of Yunika Vision at Seibu-Shinjuku Station from December 4–10, 2020. The 16th and final volume was released on September 4, 2025.

Viz Media began publishing the series in English on its website on August 2, 2020, under the title Kaiju No. 8, and on February 19, 2021, it announced that it had licensed the series for print in English, releasing the first volume on December 7, 2021. Shueisha began publishing chapters of the series on its Manga Plus website and app on July 22, 2020, under the title Monster #8 in English and several other languages. (Note: By November 9, 2024, the series was also available in Spanish, Thai, Indonesian, Russian, French, Brazilian Portuguese and Vietnamese.) On March 30, 2023, Manga Plus announced that it would include Kaiju No. 8 in the title of the version of the manga on its service.

To promote the release of the first volume in France, publisher Crunchyroll (then known as Kazé) displayed a mural on the Bibliothèque Nationale in Paris from October 6–15, 2021. The series is licensed in Italy by Star Comics, the publication of which was commemorated by the display of a mural in the Porta Genova metro station in Milan. The series is also licensed in Spain by Planeta Cómic, in Argentina by Editorial Ivrea, in Taiwan by Ever Glory Publishing, and in Poland by Studio JG.

A vertical-scrolling full-color edition of the series began on Shueisha's Jump Toon vertical-scrolling manga service on September 1, 2025.

==== Spin-offs ====
A spin-off manga illustrated by Kentaro Hidano, titled Kaiju No. 8: B-Side (怪獣8号 side B) ran from January 5 to July 12, 2024, on Shōnen Jump+. The spin-off is based on the light novel Kaiju No. 8: Exclusive on the Third Division, written by Keiji Andō, and features side-stories of Defense Force members. Shueisha collected its chapters in two tankōbon volumes, released on April 4 and October 4, 2024. Shueisha and Viz Media began publishing the series in English on January 4, 2024, Shueisha on its Manga Plus website and app and Viz Media on its Shonen Jump website and app. Viz Media released the volumes in print on April 8 and September 2, 2025.

Another spin-off manga, illustrated by Kizuku Watanabe, titled Kaiju No. 8 Relax (怪獣8号 RELAX), began its serialization in Saikyō Jump on June 4, 2024, and on Shōnen Jump+ on June 7 of the same year. Shueisha released its first volume on November 1, 2024. As of September 4, 2026, five volumes have been released. Viz Media began publishing the series in print, with the first volume released on December 2, 2025.

=== Light novel ===
A 4-chapter side-story light novel titled Kaiju No. 8: Exclusive on the Third Division (怪獣8号 密着！第3部隊, Kaijū Hachigō: Mitchaku! Daisan Butai) written by Keiji Andō and illustrated by Matsumoto, was released on November 4, 2022. On February 2, 2024, Viz Media announced that it had licensed the light novel for print in English. It was published on December 3, 2024.

=== Anime ===
On August 4, 2022, it was announced that the manga would be receiving an anime adaptation, later revealed to be a television series produced by Production I.G, with Studio Khara supervising the kaiju designs and artworks. It is directed by Shigeyuki Miya and Tomomi Kamiya, with scripts by Ichirō Ōkouchi, character designs and chief animation direction by Tetsuya Nishio, art direction by Shinji Kimura, and monster designs by Mahiro Maeda. The series aired from April 13 to June 29, 2024, on TV Tokyo and its affiliates, alongside Twitter for simulcast in Japan.

Crunchyroll streamed the series as it aired in Japan, as well as dubbed versions an hour after its television premiere, which includes English, Brazilian Portuguese, French, German, Italian, Spanish, Latin American Spanish, Hindi, Telugu, and Tamil. The first season was released in Blu-ray on December 9, 2025. Medialink licensed the series for streaming in Southeast Asia on its Ani-One Asia YouTube channel.

After the airing of the final episode, a sequel was announced. It was announced that it would be a second season, which aired from July 19 to September 27, 2025. A compilation film of the first season and an original episode, "Hoshina's Day Off" (保科の休日, Hoshina no Kyūjitsu), was screened together in Japanese theaters for three weeks starting on March 28, 2025; the "Hoshina's Day Off" episode aired on TV Tokyo and affiliates on July 5 of the same year. It was announced that the film would have a worldwide release, later revealed to be screenings in North America, the United Kingdom, and Ireland with distribution by Sony Pictures Entertainment and under the title Kaiju No. 8: Mission Recon. The film was also released in India. Crunchyroll is also streaming the second season.

In December 2025, a "conclusion arc" to the anime was announced. In October 2026, it was announced that the conclusion would be an anime film titled Kaiju No. 8: The Final Mission (劇場版 怪獣8号, Gekijō-ban Kaijū Hachigō), set to premiere in 2027. Shigeyuki Miya is returning to direct the film.

A series of 31 short episodes, titled Minute! Kaiju No. 8 (ミニっと！かいじゅう8号, Minitto! Kaijū 8-gō), was released on Toho Animation's YouTube channel from December 6, 2024, to July 4, 2025. Another series of four short episodes, titled "Narumi's Week at Work" (鳴海の平日, Narumi no Heijitsu), were released on Toho Animation's YouTube channel from September 5–26, 2026.

==== Music ====
The music was composed by Yuta Bandoh creating a film score for the series. Bandoh worked with various artists such as (sic)boy, Taiiku Okazaki and Leo Imai to compose original songs for the anime. The soundtrack also features music by "The Kaiju Band", a musical project created for the anime consisting of guitarist Takayuki "Kojiro" Sasaki, King Gnu bassist Kazuki Arai and drummer Shun Ishikawa. American artists Patrick Paige II of The Internet and Suni MF are also featured on the soundtrack which was released on June 26, 2024. The opening theme song for the first season is "Abyss", performed by Yungblud, while the ending theme song is "Nobody", performed by OneRepublic. The ending theme song for the "Hoshina's Day Off" original episode is "Invincible", performed by OneRepublic. The opening theme song for the second season is "You Can't Run From Yourself", performed by Aurora, while the ending theme song is "Beautiful Colors", performed by OneRepublic.

=== Other media ===
Kafka Hibino is featured as a playable character in the video game Captain Velvet Meteor: The Jump+ Dimensions that was released on the Nintendo Switch on July 28, 2022.

A life-size statue of Kafka's kaiju form was displayed at the Tachikawa Station on the Chūō Main Line from April 26–29, 2024. Kafka's voice actor Masaya Fukunishi was appointed as the ceremonial one-day manager at the Kaiju No. 8 store in the station. The statue was displayed in four other places from May 1 to June 16, 2024.

A video game project, titled Kaiju No. 8 the Game, was announced in June 2024. Developed by Akatsuki Games, it was released for smartphones on August 31, 2025, and for Windows (via Steam) on October 1.

== Reception ==
=== Popularity ===
According to Yūta Momiyama, the deputy editor-in-chief of Shōnen Jump+, Kaiju No. 8, along with Spy × Family, have been very popular and are doing especially well on the Manga Plus service. In December 2020, it was reported that Kaiju No. 8 surpassed 30 million views, making it the fastest Shōnen Jump+ series to achieve this feat, and each new chapter published surpasses one million views. In February 2021, the series reached 70 million views. In April 2021, the series reached over 100 million views. In February 2023, the series reached 400 million views. The series ranked tenth on AnimeJapan's 5th "Most Wanted Anime Adaptation" poll in 2022.

=== Manga ===
The School Library Journal listed the first volume of Kaiju No. 8 as one of the top 10 manga of 2021. It ranked third on Takarajimasha's Kono Manga ga Sugoi! 2022 list of best manga for male readers. The series ranked second on the Nationwide Bookstore Employees' Recommended Comics of 2022. The series was included in Polygon's list of the best comics of 2021, Kotaku's list of the 11 best manga series of 2021 and The Fandom Post's list of the 12 best manga series of 2020.

==== Sales ====
===== Japan =====
The series' first volume sold 90,831 copies in its first week, and 69,404 copies in its second week. By December 2020, the first volumes had over 430,000 copies in circulation (print and digital). In January 2021, it was reported that the series was the best-selling new manga of 2020, within only 28 days since the first volume was published. By March 2021, the manga had over 1 million copies printed physically and 200,000 copies sold digitally, making it the fastest Shōnen Jump+ series to reach 1 million copies in circulation, and 20 days later reached 1.5 million copies in circulation. By June 2021, the manga had 2.5 million copies in circulation, and by middle of the month it reached 3 million copies. By September 2021, the manga had over 4 million copies in circulation; over 5.5 million copies in circulation by December 2021; over 6.7 million copies in circulation by March 2022; over 7.8 million copies in circulation by July 2022; over 8 million copies in circulation by August 2022; over 10 million copies in circulation by December 2022; over 11 million copies in circulation by March 2023; over 13 million copies in circulation by April 2024; over 14 million copies in circulation by June 2024; over 15 million copies in circulation by July 2024; over 16 million copies in circulation by September 2024; over 18 million copies in circulation by March 2025; over 19 million copies in circulation by September 2025; and over 20 million copies in circulation by September 2026.

The series' fifth and sixth volumes were among the 30 best-selling manga volumes of 2022. The ninth volume was among the best-selling manga volumes of 2023. Volume 10 was Shueisha's seventh highest first print run manga volume of 2023–2024 (period from April 2023 to March 2024), with 600,000 copies printed; volume 12 had an initial print run of 500,000 copies printed, making it the publisher's eighth highest first print run manga volume of 2024–2025 (period from April 2024 to March 2025).

===== International =====
In the United States, individual volumes have ranked on Circana (formerly NPD) Bookscan's monthly list since 2021 and on The New York Times' Graphic Books and Manga bestseller monthly list since 2022. The series' first volume sold sold 118,000 copies in 2022, and the fifth one sold 52,000 copies in 2023.

In France, the series sold 22,041 copies in its first week, making it the best-selling debut of manga in France. By April 2023, the series sold 888,888 copies in France. In Italy, the first volume had a first print run of 245,000 copies (including various editions), surpassing Demon Slayer: Kimetsu no Yaiba, which has 200,000 copies in circulation per volume.

==== Critical reception ====
The series' first volume has been positively received. (Note: Multiple references:) The series has been praised for its premise, which has drawn comparisons to the Ultraman series, for its art, (Note: Multiple references:) particularly the kaiju designs (Note: Multiple references:) and for its comedy. Kafka Hibino has been singled out as an endearing character and a novel aspect of the series due to his age. (Note: Multiple references:) However, the first volume received some criticism for its formulaic beginning as well as, what was deemed as, inconsistent art quality and fast pacing that sacrifices character development.

==== Awards and nominations ====
Year	Award	Category	Result	Ref.
2021	14th Manga Taishō	Grand Prize	6th place	
2021	5th Tsutaya Comic Award	Next Hit	2nd place	
2021	Geeks d'Ouro	Best Manga Series	Won	
2021	Tokyo's New Manga Award	Best Manga	Won	
2021	7th Next Manga Award	Web Manga	Won	
2021	7th Ayumi Comic Award	Grand Prize	Won	
2021	Da Vinci 21st Annual Book of the Year	Book of the Year	12th place	
2022	26th Tezuka Osamu Cultural Prize	Cultural Prize	Nominated	
2022	eBook Initiative Japan Manga Award	Grand Prize	Won	
2022	Eisner Award	Best U.S. Edition of International Material—Asia	Nominated	
2022	Da Vinci 22nd Annual Book of the Year	Book of the Year	26th place	
2024	30th Manga Barcelona Awards	Best Shōnen	Nominated	

=== Anime ===
==== Critical reception ====
The series premiere was positively received. Writing for Anime News Network, Rebecca Silverman praised the art, animation and music saying that the series treads familiar territory but that "it's very comfortably working within the bounds of its genre." James Beckett complemented Production I.G for successfully balancing comedic elements of the story with "wonderful and weighty little beats that sell the entire world that much more effectively." Nicholas Dupree praised the show's action sequences and worldbuilding, noting that Kafka is a character who is easy to root for while Richard Eisenbeis praised the animation, specifically the detailed and realistic depiction of kaiju fights and their dissection, although he found the character designs to be simplistic. Digital Spy's Janet A Leigh praised the series' premiere for its animation and action, comparing its premise to Attack on Titan but with a more light-hearted tone. Toussaint Egan of Polygon similarly described the series' premise as a combination of My Hero Academia and Pacific Rim while praising its tone, dramatic moments, action and art direction.

In a series of reviews of the first season, Grant Jones of Anime News Network first season offered praise for the season's second half. (Note: Reviews:) Episode 6 ("Sagamihara Neutralization Operation at Daybreak") provided story elements that expanded upon the world of the series. Episode 8 ("Welcome to the Defense Force") was a highlight due to a well animated fight scene between Kafka and Soshiro, for providing depth to supporting characters and for increased tension due to Kafka's secret identity nearly being revealed. Episode 10 ("Secret Revealed") was praised for the surprising development of Kafka revealing his kaiju form to the Defense Force as Jones expected this to happen much later. The final two episodes were praised for their overall presentation in terms of animation, direction and storyboarding with the eleventh episode ("Kaiju No. 8 Captured") bringing the "visual fidelity to the highest levels in the season thus far" while the final episode ("Kafka Hibino") provided an effective cliffhanger for the second season. Criticisms of the season were aimed at the character designs which were described as "rather bland" and "very flat." Episode 3 ("Revenge Match") was seen as a low point of the season due to its reliance on tropes and its "lackluster" animation. Isaiah Colbert of IGN wrote positively of the first season saying that even though the series follows standard tropes of "other shōnen anime," its balance of action and drama allowed for "character-rich moments" that added depth and intrigue to the story.

Also reviewing the first season, Steven Pearce of The Encyclopedia of Science Fiction described Kaiju No. 8 as an exciting and enjoyable anime, praising its well-animated action sequences, effective humor and likeable ensemble of characters. Although he considered the protagonists familiar character archetypes, he found their interactions engaging and singled out Kaiju No. 9 as an interesting antagonist. The encyclopedia also highlighted the series' combination of kaiju conventions with science fiction elements, including powered armor, advanced military technology and the protagonist's struggle to retain his identity after transforming into a monster. It suggested that the setting represented an alternate history or near future in which kaiju attacks were commonplace, and speculated that the protagonist's name, Kafka, alluded to Franz Kafka's The Metamorphosis.

==== Accolades ====
Year	Award	Category	Recipient	Result	Ref.
2024	Yahoo! Japan Search Awards	Anime Category	Kaiju No. 8	2nd place	
2024	30th Manga Barcelona Awards	Best Anime Series Premiere	Kaiju No. 8	Nominated	
2024	IGN Awards	Best Anime Series	Kaiju No. 8	Nominated	
2025	7th Global Demand Awards	Most In-Demand Horror Series of 2024	Kaiju No. 8	Nominated	
2025	52nd Saturn Awards	Best Animated Television Series or Special	Kaiju No. 8	Nominated	
2025	39th Japan Gold Disc Awards	Song of the Year by Download (Western)	"Nobody" by OneRepublic	Won	
2025	Music Awards Japan	Best of Listeners' Choice: International Song	"Nobody" by OneRepublic	Nominated	
2025	9th Crunchyroll Anime Awards	Anime of the Year	Kaiju No. 8	Nominated	
2025	9th Crunchyroll Anime Awards	Best New Series	Kaiju No. 8	Nominated	
2025	9th Crunchyroll Anime Awards	Best Action	Kaiju No. 8	Nominated	
2025	9th Crunchyroll Anime Awards	Best Animation	Kaiju No. 8	Nominated	
2025	9th Crunchyroll Anime Awards	Best Character Design	Tetsuya Nishio	Nominated	
2025	9th Crunchyroll Anime Awards	Best Main Character	Kafka Hibino	Nominated	
2025	9th Crunchyroll Anime Awards	Best Anime Song	"Abyss" by Yungblud	Nominated	
2025	9th Crunchyroll Anime Awards	Best Opening Sequence	"Abyss" by Yungblud	Nominated	
2025	9th Crunchyroll Anime Awards	Best Ending Sequence	"Nobody" by OneRepublic	Nominated	
2025	9th Crunchyroll Anime Awards	Best Voice Artist Performance (Castilian)	Mario Ballart as Kafka Hibino	Nominated	
2025	9th Crunchyroll Anime Awards	Best Voice Artist Performance (French)	Adrien Antoine as Kafka Hibino	Won	
2025	9th Crunchyroll Anime Awards	Best Voice Artist Performance (German)	Felix Kamin as Kafka Hibino	Nominated	
2025	9th Crunchyroll Anime Awards	Best Voice Artist Performance (Hindi)	Rushikesh Phunse as Kafka Hibino	Nominated	
2025	9th Crunchyroll Anime Awards	Best Voice Artist Performance (Italian)	Mattia Bressan as Kafka Hibino	Nominated	
2025	9th Crunchyroll Anime Awards	Best Voice Artist Performance (Spanish)	Omar Sánchez as Kafka Hibino	Nominated	
2025	9th Crunchyroll Anime Awards	Best Voice Artist Performance (Portuguese)	Heitor Assali as Reno Ichikawa	Nominated	
2025	Japan Expo Awards	Daruma for Best Action Anime	Kaiju No. 8	Nominated	
2025	Japan Expo Awards	Daruma for Best Ending	"Nobody" by OneRepublic	Won	
2025	20th AnimaniA Awards	Best TV Series: Online	Kaiju No. 8	Nominated	
2025	20th AnimaniA Awards	Best Director	Shigeyuki Miya and Tomomi Kamiya	Nominated	
2025	20th AnimaniA Awards	Best Studio	Production I.G	Nominated	
2025	TikTok Awards Japan	Anime of the Year	Kaiju No. 8	Nominated	
2026	8th Global Demand Awards	Most In-Demand Horror Series of 2025	Kaiju No. 8	Nominated	
2026	10th Crunchyroll Anime Awards	Best Continuing Series	Kaiju No. 8 Season 2	Nominated	
2026	10th Crunchyroll Anime Awards	Best Action	Kaiju No. 8 Season 2	Nominated	
2026	10th Crunchyroll Anime Awards	Best Ending Sequence	"Beautiful Colors" by OneRepublic	Nominated	
2026	10th Crunchyroll Anime Awards	Best Voice Artist Performance (Italian)	Martina Tamburello as Kikoru Shinomiya	Nominated	
2026	21st AnimaniA Awards	Best TV Sequel Series: Online	Kaiju No. 8 Season 2	Nominated	
