= Naoya Matsumoto (manga artist) =

Japanese manga artist

Naoya Matsumoto 松本直也
- Born: Hyōgo Prefecture, Japan
- Area: Manga artist
- Notable works: Kaiju No. 8
- Awards: 27th Jump Twelve Newcomer Manga Award (2005)

Naoya Matsumoto (Japanese: 松本直也, Hepburn: Matsumoto Naoya) is a Japanese manga artist, known for his work Kaiju No. 8.

== Biography ==
In 2005 , he was a finalist for the 22nd Jump Twelve Newcomer Manga Award with Spiritual People. In the same year, he won the 27th Jump Twelve Newcomer Manga Award with Necromancer (ネコロマンサー, Nekoromansā). In 2006, the same work was published in Akamaru Jump, marking his debut.

Neko Wappa! (ねこわっぱ!) was published in Weekly Shōnen Jump issue 27 of 2009 as an entry in the JG1 One-Shot Festival, and was serialized in the magazine from issue 50 of 2009 to issue 11 of 2010.

In 2013, Pochikuro (ポチクロ) was published in the 2013 Autumn issue of Shōnen Jump Next!. It was serialized in Shōnen Jump+ from 2014 to 2015.

In 2020, he began serializing Kaiju No. 8 in Shōnen Jump+.

== Works ==
=== Serialized manga ===
- Neko Wappa! (ねこわっぱ!) – serialized in Weekly Shōnen Jump (2009–2010)
- Pochikuro (ポチクロ) – serialized in Shōnen Jump+ (September 22, 2014 – July 31, 2015)
- Kaiju No. 8 (怪獣8号, Kaijū 8-gō) – serialized in Shōnen Jump+ (July 3, 2020 – July 18, 2025) and published by Shueisha in sixteen volumes

=== One-shots ===
- Spiritual People (2005)
- Necromancer (ネコロマンサー, Nekoromansā) – published in Akamaru Jump Winter issue (2006)
- Room Stranger – Akamaru Jump Summer issue (2006)
- Majo ni Natta Shōnen (魔女になった少年; "The Boy Who Became a Witch") – Akamaru Jump Spring issue (2007)
- Neko Wappa! (ねこわっぱ!, "Neko Wappa!") – Weekly Shōnen Jump (2009)
- Shikai enbu (四海演武; "Four Seas Demonstration") – Shōnen Jump Next! Spring issue (2012)
- Pochikuro (ポチクロ, Pochikuro) – Shōnen Jump Next! Autumn issue (2013)
