= Perfume discography =

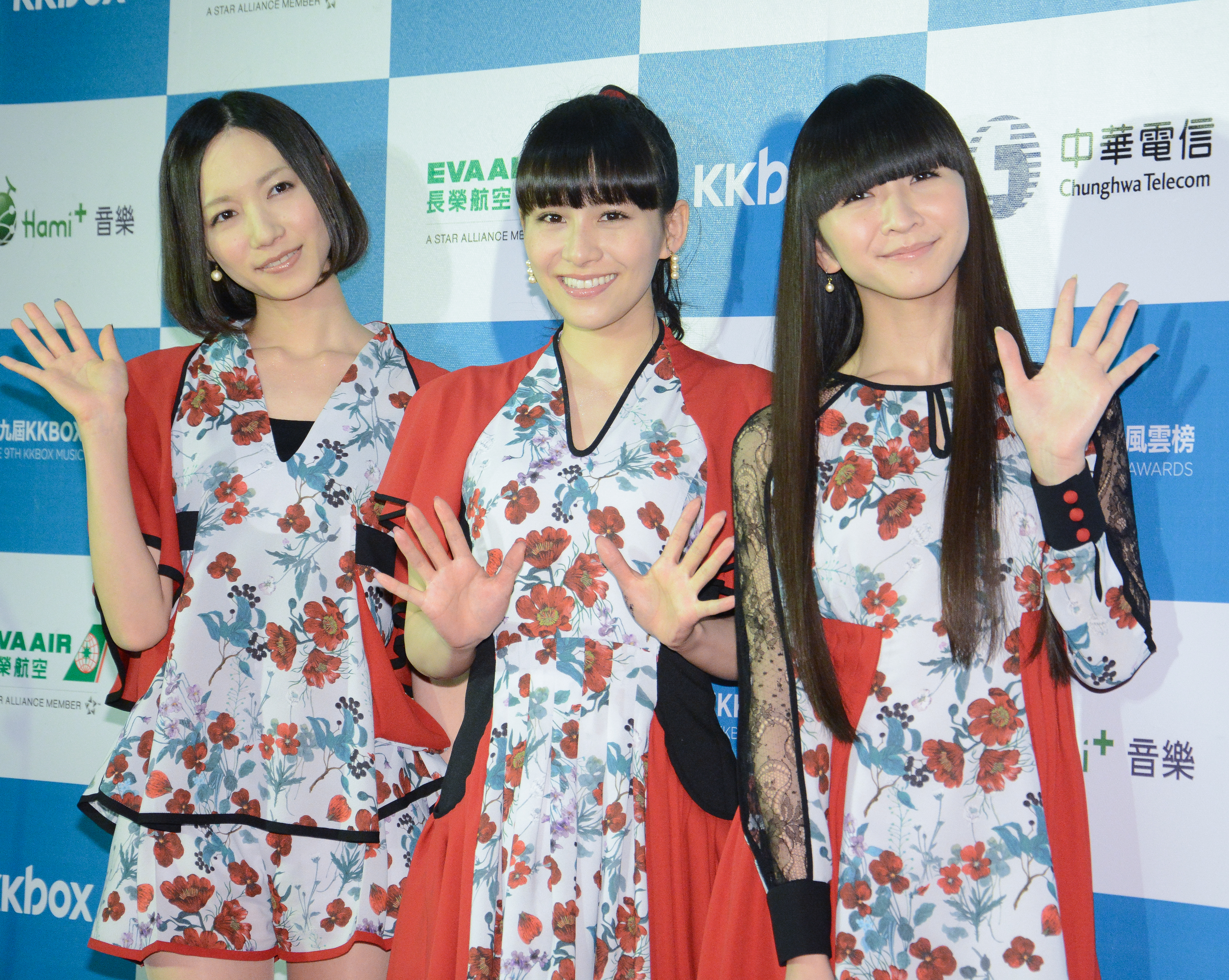
- Perfume at the KKBOX Music Awards on in 2014
- Studio albums: 9
- Extended plays: 1
- Compilation albums: 3
- Singles: 29
- Video albums: 13
- Music videos: 45

The discography of Japanese pop and electronic dance group Perfume consists of nine studio albums, three compilation albums, twenty-eight singles and six video albums. Forming in 2001, the group debuted as local Hiroshima idols, releasing two singles through the independent Momiji Label. In 2003, the members moved to Tokyo to further their career as idols. Signing with independent label Bee-Hive Records, the group met electronic producer Yasutaka Nakata of the band Capsule, who began to produce their music from 2003 onward.

In 2005, the group made their major label debut under Tokuma Japan Communications with the single "Linear Motor Girl", and in 2007 broke through into the mainstream Japanese market with the single "Polyrhythm", their first Oricon chart top ten release. The band's resulting debut studio album Game (2008) was a great success, becoming certified double platinum by the Recording Industry Association of Japan. After releasing the albums Triangle (2009) and JPN (2011), featuring the commercially successful songs "Love the World" (2008), "Dream Fighter" (2008), "One Room Disco" (2009) and "Voice" (2011), Perfume parted with Tokuma Japan, signing with Universal Music Japan in order to pursue global markets.

== Studio albums ==
List of albums, with selected chart positions and certifications
Title	Album details	Peak positions				Sales (Note: Sales provided by Oricon database and are rounded to the nearest thousand copies.)	Certifications
Title	Album details	JPN	KOR (Note: The Gaon Albums Chart was established in 2010.)	KOR Intl. (Note: Week references for Gaon: "Laser Beam", JPN, "Love the World", "Mirai no Museum", "Magic of Love", Level3, "Cling Cling".)	TWN East Asia (Note: Week references for G-Music: JPN 2012 week 15, "Spending All My Time" 2012 week 35, Love the World 2012 week 41, "Mirai no Museum" 2013 week 10, "Magic of Love" and Perfume World Tour 1st 2013 week 21, Level3 2013 week 40, "Sweet Refrain" 2013 week 48, "Cling Cling" 2014 week 30, Perfume 3rd Tour JPN and Perfume 4th Tour in Dome: Level3 2014 week 44, "Relax in the City/Pick Me Up".)	Sales	Certifications
Game	Released: April 16, 2008 (JPN); Label: Tokuma Japan Communications; Formats: CD, CD/DVD, digital download, LP	1	—	—	—	JPN: 477,000	RIAJ: 2× Platinum
Triangle	Released: July 8, 2009 (JPN); Label: Tokuma Japan; Formats: CD, CD/DVD, digital download, LP	1	—	—	—	JPN: 331,000	RIAJ: Platinum
JPN	Released: November 30, 2011 (JPN); Label: Tokuma Japan; Formats: CD, CD/DVD, digital download, LP	1	82	16	10	JPN: 354,000	RIAJ: Platinum
Level3	Released: October 2, 2013 (JPN); Label: Universal J; Formats: CD, CD/DVD, LP, digital download	1	43	9	4	JPN: 255,000	RIAJ: Platinum
Cosmic Explorer	Released: April 6, 2016 (JPN); Label: Universal J; Formats: CD, CD/DVD, CD/Blu-ray, digital download, LP	1	36	5	—	JPN: 189,000	RIAJ: Gold
Future Pop	Released: August 15, 2018 (JPN); Label: Universal J; Formats: CD, CD/DVD, CD/Blu-ray, digital download, LP	1	—	—	—	JPN: 107,000; JPN: 13,000 (dig.)	RIAJ: Gold
Plasma	Released: July 27, 2022 (JPN); Label: Universal J; Formats: CD, CD/DVD, CD/Blu-ray, digital download	3	—	—	—	JPN: 53,966; JPN: 4,106 (dig.)	
Nebula Romance: Part I	Released: September 20, 2024 (JPN); Label: Polydor; Formats: CD, digital download, streaming	5	—	—	—	JPN: 29,337; JPN: 2,006 (dig.)	
Nebula Romance: Part II	Released: August 18, 2025 (JPN); Label: Polydor; Formats: CD, digital download, streaming	3	—	—	—	JPN: 27,196; JPN: 3,059 (dig.)	
"—" denotes items that did not chart.

== Compilation albums ==
List of albums, with selected chart positions and certifications
Title	Album details	Peak positions				Sales	Certifications
Title	Album details	JPN	KOR	KOR Intl.	TWN East Asia	Sales	Certifications
Perfume: Complete Best	Released: August 2, 2006 (JPN); Label: Tokuma Japan; Formats: CD, CD/DVD, digital download, LP	24	—	—	—	JPN: 177,000	RIAJ: Platinum
Perfume Global Compilation "Love the World"	Released: September 12, 2012 (WW); Label: Tokuma Japan; Formats: CD, digital download, LP	1	41	5	8	JPN: 190,000	RIAJ: Gold
Perfume the Best 'P Cubed'	Released: September 18, 2019 (WW); Label: Universal Music Japan; Formats: 3CD, 3CD/DVD, 3CD/Blu-ray, digital download, LP	1	—	—	2	JPN: 130,439; JPN: 50,000 (dig.)	RIAJ: Gold
"—" denotes items that did not chart.

== Extended plays ==
List of EPs, with selected chart positions and sales
Title	EP details	Peak positions	Sales
Title	EP details	JPN	Sales
Polygon Wave EP	Released: September 22, 2021 (WW); Label: Universal J, Perfume; Formats: CD, digital download	2	JPN: 27,403 (phy.)

== Box sets ==
List of box sets, with selected chart positions and sales
Title	Album details	Peak positions	Sales
Title	Album details	JPN	Sales
Fan Service -Prima Box-	Released: February 13, 2008 (JPN); Label: Amuse Soft Entertainment; Formats: 3CD/DVD	9	JPN: 31,000
Perfume Complete "LP" Box	Released: February 17, 2016 (JPN); Label: Tokuma Japan; Formats: 6LP	19	JPN: 3,000

== Singles ==
=== As lead artist ===
List of singles, with selected chart positions and certifications
Title	Year	Peak chart positions					Sales (JPN)	Certifications	Album
Title	Year	JPN	JPN Hot (Note: Sources for chart positions are as follows: "Chocolate Disco", "Polyrhythm", "Baby Cruising Love", "Secret Secret", "Ceramic Girl", "Love the World", "Dream Fighter", "One Room Disco", "Night Flight", "I Still Love U", "Natural ni Koishite", "Fushizen na Girl", "Voice", "575", "Nee", "Laser Beam", "Kasuka na Kaori", "Let's Try Again", "Spice", "Glitter", "Spring of Life", "Spending All My Time", "Mirai no Museum", "Magic of Love", "1mm", "Sweet Refrain", "Hold Your Hand", "Cling Cling", "Relax in the City", "Pick Me Up", "Star Train", "Flash", "Mugen Mirai", "Let Me Know", "Flow", "Moon", "Cold Sleep".)	KOR	KOR Intl.	TWN East Asia	Sales (JPN)	Certifications	Album
"Omajinai Perori" (OMAJINAI★ペロリ; "Gulp Down a Good Luck Charm")	2002	—	—	—	—	—			Non-album singles
"Kareshi Boshuchu" (彼氏募集中; "Looking for a Boyfriend")	2002	—	—	—	—	—			Non-album singles
"Sweet Donuts" (スウィートドーナッツ, Suīto Dōnattsu)	2003	—	—	—	—	—			Perfume -Complete Best-
"Monochrome Effect" (モノクロームエフェクト, Monokurōmu Efekuto)	2004	117	—	—	—	—	1,000		Perfume -Complete Best-
"Vitamin Drop" (ビタミンドロップ, Bitamin Doroppu)	2004	119	—	—	—	—	1,000		Perfume -Complete Best-
"Linear Motor Girl" (リニアモーターガール, Rinia Mōtā Gāru)	2005	99	—	—	—	—	3,000		Perfume -Complete Best-
"Computer City" (コンピューターシティ, Konpyūtā Shiti)	2006	45	—	—	—	—	4,000		Perfume -Complete Best-
"Electro World" (エレクトロ・ワールド, Erekutoro Wārudo)	2006	77	—	—	—	—	2,000		Perfume -Complete Best-
"Fan Service (Sweet)" (ファン・サーヴィス［sweet］, Fan Sāvisu Suīto) (Note: Two track single featuring the songs "Chocolate Disco" and "Twinkle Snow Powdery Snow".)	2007	31	—	—	—	—	9,000		Game
"Polyrhythm" (ポリリズム, Poririzumu)	2007	7	39 (Note: Charted in 2008.)	—	—	—	77,000	RIAJ (cellphone): Gold; RIAJ (physical): Gold	Game
"Baby Cruising Love"	2008	3	2	—	—	—	66,000		Game
"Macaroni" (マカロニ, Makaroni)	2008	3	—	—	—	—	66,000		Game
"Love the World"	2008	1	1	—	—	—	146,000	RIAJ (cellphone): Gold; RIAJ (physical): Gold	Triangle
"Dream Fighter"	2008	2	2	—	—	—	108,000	RIAJ (cellphone): Gold; RIAJ (physical): Gold	Triangle
"One Room Disco" (ワンルーム・ディスコ, Wanrūmu Disuko)	2009	1	1	—	—	—	101,000	RIAJ (cellphone): Gold; RIAJ (physical): Gold	Triangle
"Natural ni Koishite" (ナチュラルに恋して; "Loving Naturally")	2010	2	5	—	—	—	107,000		JPN
"Fushizen na Girl" (不自然なガール; "Unnatural Girl")	2010	2	2	—	—	—	107,000	RIAJ (physical): Gold	JPN
"Voice"	2010	2	2	—	—	—	121,000	RIAJ (cellphone): Gold; RIAJ (physical): Gold	JPN
"Nee" (ねぇ; "Hey")	2010	2	8	—	—	—	108,000	RIAJ (physical): Gold	JPN
"Laser Beam" (レーザービーム, Rēzā Bīmu)	2011	2	2	48	—	—	125,000	RIAJ (physical): Gold	JPN
"Kasuka na Kaori" (微かなカオリ; "Faint Scent")	2011	2	82	—	—	—	125,000		JPN
"Spice" (スパイス, Supaisu)	2011	2	2	—	—	—	92,000	RIAJ (physical): Gold	JPN
"Spring of Life"	2012	2	1	—	—	—	116,000	RIAJ (download): Gold; RIAJ (physical): Gold	Level3
"Spending All My Time"	2012	2	2	—	—	8	105,000	RIAJ (physical): Gold	Level3
"Mirai no Museum" (未来のミュージアム; "Museum of the Future")	2013	2	2	—	23	13	92,000	RIAJ (physical): Gold	Level3
"Magic of Love"	2013	3	3	—	17	7	78,000	RIAJ (physical): Gold	Level3
"Sweet Refrain"	2013	3	2	—	—	9	70,000		Cosmic Explorer
"Cling Cling"	2014	2	2	83	19	9	88,000	RIAJ (physical): Gold	Cosmic Explorer
"Relax in the City"	2015	2	2	—	—	4	71,000		Cosmic Explorer
"Pick Me Up"	2015	2	69	—	—	4	71,000		Cosmic Explorer
"Star Train"	2015	4	2	—	—	—	80,000	RIAJ (physical): Gold	Cosmic Explorer
"Tokyo Girl"	2017	2	2	—	—	—	65,000	RIAJ (digital): Platinum	Future Pop
"If You Wanna"	2017	2	3	—	—	—	58,000		Future Pop
"Mugenmirai" (無限未来, "Endless Future")	2018	4	4	—	—	—	52,000; 52,000 (digital)		Future Pop
"Time Warp"	2020	2	9	—	—	—	33,099		Plasma
"Flow"	2022	5	14	—	—	—	25,297		Plasma
"Moon"	2023	9	15	—	—	—	16,554		Nebula Romance: Part II
"—" denotes items that did not chart, were not released in that territory or were released before the creation of the Billboard Japan Hot 100, Gaon or G-Music charts.

=== As a featured artist ===
List of singles, with selected chart positions and certifications
Title	Year	Peak chart positions		Sales (JPN)	Certifications	Album
Title	Year	JPN	JPN Hot	Sales (JPN)	Certifications	Album
"Akihabalove" (アキハバラブ, Akihabarabu) (as Perfume x DJ Momo-i)	2005	—	—			
"Let's Try Again" (Note: Song by the charity supergroup Team Amuse!!, which formed by celebrities managed by Amuse, supporting the victims of the 2011 Tōhoku earthquake and tsunami. The song was written by Kuwata Keisuke, and featured parts of Perfume's "Polyrhythm" in a medley.) (among Team Amuse!!)	2011	2	2	314,000	RIAJ (physical): Platinum	
"Sore o Tsuyosa to Yobitai" (それを強さと呼びたい; "I Want to Call That Strength") (Note: Song featuring all 13 musicians who performed at the Amuse Fes 2014 BB in Tsumagoi event (Perfume, Porno Graffitti, Flumpool, Begin, Skoop On Somebody, Yu Takahashi, Weaver, Mihiro, Monobright, Rihwa, Haku, Sakura Fujiwara & Cross Gene). Lyrics co-written by A~chan (Perfume) and Haruichi Shindo (Porno Graffiti).)	2014	—	—			
"I Don't Understand You" (as Perfume & OK Go)	2016	—	—			
"Sore o Tsuyosa to Yobitai ~2019 Ver.~" (それを強さと呼びたい ~2019 Ver.~; "I Want to Call That Strength ~2019 Ver.~") (Note: Amuse Fes original song that performed LIVE recording at the venue on the day of "Amuse Fes in MAKUHARI 2019- koitokaaitoka". Digital single by the charity, donated for Ashinaga Ikueikai supporting the orphans and children affected by earthquake. (Performed by Perfume, Porno Graffitti, Flumpool, s**t kingz, Skoop On Somebody, Yuki Sasamura, Edgar Sullivan, Aiko Yamade, Yu Takahashi, Weaver, Rihwa, Sakura Fujiwara & FLOW). Delivery for a limited period of 1 year until June 07, 2020.)	2019	—	—			
"Colorful (Team Coca-Cola Official Song)" (Colorful (チーム コカ・コーラ公式ソング)) (Note: The Japanese branch of Coca-Cola has formed “Team Coca-Cola“, a new musical project in support of the Tokyo 2020 Olympic and Paralympic Games. (Performed by Ai, Hata Motohiro, Little Glee Monster, Miura Daichi, Perfume, Taemin (SHINee), MIYAVI, Nasty C, Sabrina Carpenter, Ayumu Imazu, Blue Vintage, Mizki, Sanari, Sato Chikuzen (Sing Like Talking) as Colorful).)	2021	—	—			
"—" denotes items that did not chart or were released before the creation of the Billboard Japan Hot 100 chart.

=== Promotional singles ===
List of promotional singles or non-billed A-sides, with selected chart positions and certifications
Title	Year	Peak chart positions		Certifications	Album
Title	Year	JPN Hot	JPN RIAJ (Note: The RIAJ Digital Track Chart is a depreciated chart that ran from 2009 until early 2012 and tracked full-length cellphone downloads.) (Note: Sources for chart positions are as follows: "Night Flight", "I Still Love U", "Chocolate Disco", "575", "Communication".)	Certifications	Album
"Twinkle Snow Powdery Snow"	2006	—	—		Fan Service [sweet] / Game
"Chocolate Disco" (チョコレイト・ディスコ, Chokoreito Disuko)	2007	24 (Note: Charted in 2014.)	76 (Note: Charted in 2010.)		Fan Service [sweet] / Game
"Secret Secret" (シークレットシークレット, Shīkuretto Shīkuretto)	2008	49	—		Game
"Ceramic Girl" (セラミックガール, Seramikku Gāru)	2008	54	—		Game
"Edge"	2008	—	— (Note: Charted at number 66 on the RIAJ monthly ringtones chart.)		"Love the World" (single) / Triangle
"Night Flight"	2009	13	20		Triangle
"I Still Love U"	2009	75	21		Triangle
"575"	2010	73	4	RIAJ (100,000): Gold	"Voice" (single) / JPN
"Glitter"	2011	88	—		"Spice" (single) / JPN
"Communication" (コミュニケーション, Komyunikēshon)	2012	—	18		"Spring of Life" (single)
"1mm"	2013	9	—N/a		Level3
"Hold Your Hand"	2014	41	—N/a		"Cling Cling" (single) / Cosmic Explorer
"Flash"	2016	2	—N/a	RIAJ (250,000): Platinum	Cosmic Explorer (Limited Edition)
"Let Me Know"	2018	53	—N/a		Future Pop
"Nananananairo" (ナナナナナイロ, Nananananairo)	2019	23	—N/a		Perfume the Best: P Cubed
"Saisei" (再生, Saisei)	2019	28	—N/a		Plasma
"Polygon Wave" (ポリゴンウェイヴ, Porigon Weivu)	2021	44	—N/a		Polygon Wave EP
"Sayonara Plastic World" (さよならプラスティックワールド, Sayonara Purasutikku Waarudo)	2022	— (Note: "Sayonara Plastic World" did not enter the Billboard Japan Hot 100 Chart, but appeared at number 12 on the component Billboard Japan Download Songs Chart.)	—N/a		Plasma
"Spinning World"	2022	— (Note: "Spinning World" did not enter the Billboard Japan Hot 100 chart, but appeared at number 44 on the component Billboard Japan Download Songs Chart.)	—N/a		Plasma
"Sumikko Disco" (すみっコディスコ, Sumikko Disuko)	2023	— (Note: "Sumikko Disco" did not enter the Billboard Japan Hot 100 chart, but appeared at number 11 on the component Billboard Japan Download Songs Chart.)	—N/a		Nebula Romance: Part I
"The Light"	2024	— (Note: "The Light" did not enter the Billboard Japan Hot 100 Chart, but appeared at number 15 on the component Billboard Japan Download Songs Chart.)	—N/a		Nebula Romance: Part I
"Human Factory (Denzo Ningen)" (Human Factory - 電造人間 -)	2025	— (Note: "Human Factory (Denzo Ningen)" did not enter the Billboard Japan Hot 100 chart, but appeared at number 22 on the component Billboard Japan Download Songs Chart.)	—N/a		Nebula Romance Part 2
"Nebula Romance" (ネビュラロマンス, Nebyura Romansu)	2025	— (Note: "Nebula Romance" did not enter the Billboard Japan Hot 100 chart, but appeared at number 14 on the component Billboard Japan Download Songs Chart.)	—N/a		Nebula Romance Part 2
"Meguloop" (巡ループ, Megurūpu)	2025	— (Note: "Meguloop" did not enter the Billboard Japan Hot 100 chart, but appeared at number 5 on the component Billboard Japan Download Songs Chart.)	—N/a		Nebula Romance Part 2
"Fumetsu no Anata" (ふめつのあなた)	2025	— (Note: "Fumetsu no Anata" did not enter the Billboard Japan Hot 100 chart, but appeared at number 13 on the component Billboard Japan Download Songs Chart.)	—N/a		—N/a
"Cold Sleep" (コールドスリープ, Kōrudo Surīpu)	2026	100	—N/a		Cold Sleep
"—" denotes items that did not chart, were released before the creation of the Japan Hot 100 chart or the RIAJ Digital Track Chart.

== Video albums ==
=== Live concerts ===
List of media, with selected chart positions
Title	Album details	Peak positions			Certifications
Title	Album details	JPN DVD	JPN Blu-ray	TWN	Certifications
Fan Service［bitter］ (ファン・サーヴィス[bitter], Fan Sāvisu Bitā)	Released: March 14, 2007 (JPN); Label: Tokuma Japan; Formats: DVD, Blu-ray	3	7	—	
Perfume First Tour "GAME"	Released: March 15, 2008 (JPN); Label: Tokuma Japan; Formats: DVD, Blu-ray	1	6	—	RIAJ: Gold
Perfume "BUDOUKaaaaaaaaaaN"	Released: April 22, 2009 (JPN); Label: Tokuma Japan; Formats: DVD, Blu-ray	1	5	—	RIAJ: Gold
Perfume Second Tour 2009 "Chokkaku Nitohen Sankakkei Tour" (Perfume Second Tour 2009 直角二等辺三角形TOUR)	Released: January 13, 2010 (JPN); Label: Tokuma Japan; Formats: 2DVDs, Blu-ray	1	4	—	
10th Anniversary Since Formation, 5th Major Debut Anniversary! Perfume LIVE @ Tokyo Dome "1 2 3 4 5 6 7 8 9 10 11" (結成10周年、メジャーデビュー5周年記念!Perfume LIVE@東京ドーム「1 2 3 4 5 6 7 8 9 10 11」)	Released: February 21, 2011 (JPN); Label: Tokuma Japan; Formats: DVD, 2DVDs, Blu-ray	1	2	—	RIAJ: Gold
Perfume 3rd Tour "JPN"	Released: August 1, 2012 (JPN); Label: Universal; Formats: DVD, 2DVDs, Blu-ray	1	3	5	RIAJ: Gold
Perfume WORLD TOUR 1st	Released: June 3, 2013 (JPN); Label: Universal; Formats: DVD, 2DVDs, Blu-ray	1	6	3	
Perfume 4th Tour in DOME "LEVEL3"	Released: April 9, 2014 (JPN); Label: Universal; Formats: DVD, 2DVDs, Blu-ray, 2Blu-rays	2	1	5	
Perfume WORLD TOUR 2nd	Released: October 1, 2014 (JPN); Label: Universal; Formats: DVD, Blu-ray	1	1	—	
Perfume 5th Tour 2014 "Gurun Gurun" (ぐるんぐるん)	Released: March 10, 2015 (JPN); Label: Universal; Formats: DVD, 2DVDs, Blu-ray, 2Blu-rays	1	1	—N/a	
Perfume WORLD TOUR 3rd	Released: July 22, 2015 (JPN); Label: Universal; Formats: DVD, Blu-ray	3	2	—N/a	
Perfume Anniversary 10days 2015 PPPPPPPPPP "LIVE 3:5:6:9"	Released: January 13, 2016 (JPN); Label: Universal; Formats: DVD, 2DVDs, Blu-ray, 2Blu-rays	2	1	—N/a	
Perfume 6th Tour 2016 "COSMIC EXPLORER"	Released: April 5, 2017 (JPN); Label: Universal; Formats: 2DVDs, 3DVDs, 2Blu-rays, 3Blu-rays	2	1	—N/a	
P. T. A. Hossoku 10-shūnen! ! To 5-shūnen! ! “Perfume to anata” Hall tour	(Only members of the fan club P.T.A); Released: September 21, 2018 (JPN); Label: Formats: 2DVDs, Blu-ray	—N/a	—N/a	—N/a	
Perfume 7th Tour 2018 "Future Pop"	Released: April 3, 2019 (JPN); Label: Universal; Formats: DVD, 2DVDs, Blu-ray, 2Blu-rays	2	1	—N/a	
Perfume 8th Tour 2020 "P Cubed" in Dome	Released: September 2, 2020 (JPN); Label: Universal; Formats: DVD, 2DVDs, Blu-ray, 2Blu-rays	1	1	—N/a	
Perfume LIVE 2021[polygonwave]	Released: December 24, 2022 (JPN); Label: Universal; Formats: DVD, 2DVDs, Blu-ray, 2Blu-rays	5	6	—N/a	
Perfume 9th Tour 2022 "PLASMA"	Released: May 31, 2023 (JPN); Label: Polydor, Universal; Formats: DVD, 2DVDs, Blu-ray, 2Blu-rays	1	1	—N/a	
Perfume Countdown Live 2023→2024 “COD3 OF P3RFUM3” ZOZ5"	Released: May 22, 2024 (JPN); Label: Polydor, Universal; Formats: DVD, 2DVDs, Blu-ray, 2Blu-rays	2	2	—N/a	

=== Music video collections ===
List of media, with selected chart positions
Title	Album details	Peak positions			Certifications
Title	Album details	JPN DVD	JPN Blu-ray	TWN	Certifications
Perfume Clips	Released: February 12, 2014 (JPN); Label: Tokuma Japan; Formats: 2DVDs, 3DVDs, Blu-ray, 2Blu-rays	1	1	—	RIAJ: Gold
Perfume Clips 2	Released: November 29, 2017 (JPN); Label: UNIVERSAL J; Formats: DVD, 2DVDs, Blu-ray, 2Blu-rays	3	2	—	

=== Documentary film ===
List of media, with selected chart positions
Title	Album details	Peak positions	
Title	Album details	JPN DVD	JPN Blu-ray
We Are Perfume -World Tour 3rd Document	Released: July 18, 2016 (JPN); Label: Universal Music; Formats: 2DVD, 2Blu-ray, 2DVD+CD, 2Blu-ray+CD	5	3

=== Comedy skits ===
List of media, with selected chart positions
Title	Album details	Peak positions
Title	Album details	JPN DVD
Perfume in Happy de Kininaru Chandelier House (Perfume in Happyで気になるシャンデリアハウス; "Perfume in Happy and Anxious Chandelier House") (Note: Compilation of Happy!, Perfume no Chandelier House and Perfume no Kini Naru Ko-chan, three television comedy shows hosted by Perfume.)	Released: September 25, 2009 (JPN); Label: Amuse; Formats: DVD, Blu-ray	12

== Music videos ==
=== Songs ===
Year	Title	Director
2005	Linear Motor Girl	Kazuaki Seki
2006	Computer City	Kazuaki Seki
2006	Electro World	Kazuaki Seki
2007	Chocolate Disco	Kazuaki Seki
2007	Twinkle Snow Powdery Snow	Kazuaki Seki
2007	Polyrhythm	Kazuaki Seki
2008	Baby cruising Love	Kazuaki Seki
2008	Macaroni	Kazuaki Seki
2008	Secret Secret	Yuichi Kodama
2008	love the world	Kazuaki Seki
2008	Dream Fighter	Kazuaki Seki
2009	One Room Disco	Kazuaki Seki
2009	I still love U	Kazuaki Seki
2010	Fushizen na Girl	Kazuaki Seki
2010	Natural ni Koishite	Yuichi Kodama
2010	VOICE	Kazuaki Seki
2010	Nee	Yuichi Kodama
2011	Laser Beam	Kazuaki Seki
2011	GLITTER	Kazuaki Seki
2011	Spice	Daisuke Shimada
2011	Kasuka na Kaori	Kazuaki Seki
2012	FAKE IT	Kazuaki Seki
2012	Spring of Life	Yusuke Tanaka
2012	Spending all my time	Yusuke Tanaka
2012	Mirai no Museum	Yusuke Tanaka
2013	Magic of Love	Kazuaki Seki
2013	1mm	Kazuaki Seki
2013	Sweet Refrain	Yusuke Tanaka
2014	Cling Cling	Daisuke Shimada
2014	DISPLAY	Kazuaki Seki
2014	Hold Your Hand	Kazuaki Seki
2015	Relax In The City	Kazuaki Seki
2015	Pick Me Up	Yuichi Kodama
2015	STAR TRAIN	Kazuaki Seki
2016	FLASH	Yusuke Tanaka
2017	TOKYO GIRL	Kazuaki Seki
2017	If you wanna	Takcom
2017	Everyday	Yusuke Tanaka
2018	Mugenmirai	Yusuke Tanaka
2018	Let Me Know	Kazuaki Seki
2018	Future Pop	Yuichi Kodama
2019	Saisei	Kasico
2020	Challenger	Kazuaki Seki
2020	Time Warp	Yusuke Tanaka
2021	Polygon Wave	Yusuke Tanaka
2022	Flow	YUANN
2022	Spinning World	Yusuke Tanaka
2023	Hatenabito	Masahiro Kadokawa
2023	Moon	TAKCOM (Takafumi Tsuchiya)
2024	Cosmic Treat	Shintaro Koike
2025	Meguri Loop	Yusuke Tanaka

=== Live performances ===
Year	Title	Live performance
2017	TOKYO GIRL	"TOKYO GIRL" Release Commemorative Project
2019	Daijobanai	Coachella 2019
2021	Polygon Wave	Perfume LIVE 2021 [polygon wave]
2021	FUSION & edge	Reframe Tour 2021
2022	System Reboot & Fushizen na Girl	Perfume LIVE 2022 [polygon wave]
2022	Flow	Perfume 9th Tour 2022 "PLASMA" Saitama Super Arena
2023	Love Cloud	Perfume LIVE 2023 "CODE OF PERFUME" in London
2023	Polyrhythm, Flash & Chocolate Disco, etc.	Primavera Sound 2023 in Barcelona (digest movie)
2024	IMA IMA IMA, Cosmic Treat, etc.	Perfume 25th & 20th Anniversary Live Performance "IMA IMA IMA" Powered by NTT

=== Dance practices and lessons ===
Year	Title
2020	TOKYO GIRL
2021	Polygon Wave
2023	Moon

== Other appearances ==
List of non-studio album or guest appearances that feature Perfume
Title	Year	Album
"Oishii Recipe" (おいしいレシピ; "Tasty Recipe")	2003	Bee-Hive
"Time to Go" (among Bee-Hive)	2003	Bee-Hive
"Colorful" (among Colorful - Ai, Motohiro Hata, Little Glee Monster, Daichi Miura, Perfume, Taemin (Shinee), Miyavi, Nasty C, Sabrina Carpenter, Ayumu Imazu, Blue Vintage, Mizki, Sanari and Chikuzen Sato (Sing Like Talking))	2021	—N/a
