= Perfume the Best: P Cubed =

- Regular edition cover

Compilation album by Perfume
- Released: September 18, 2019
- Recorded: 2004–2019
- Length: 230:35
- Language: Japanese
- Label: Universal Music Japan
- Producer: Yasutaka Nakata

Perfume chronology
Future Pop (2018)	Perfume the Best: P Cubed (2019)	Polygon Wave (2021)

Perfume the Best: P Cubed (stylized Perfume the Best "P Cubed") is the third compilation album by Japanese girl group Perfume, released through Universal Music Japan on September 18, 2019. It contains 52 tracks spanning the group's career and was released to commemorate the 15th anniversary of their major debut. It contains two new songs that bookend the collection, "Challenger" and "Nananananairo".

The album debuted atop the Oricon Albums Chart and Billboard Japan Hot Albums chart, selling over 97,000 copies and an additional 50,000 units in its first week. It marked Perfume's eighth number-one album, tying them with AKB48 for the most number ones on the Oricon charts for a female group.

== Release ==
The album was made available in a variety of formats, including a standard edition with three discs, a "limited edition" with three discs and either a Blu-ray or DVD, and a "limited press edition", including the three discs, Blu-ray or DVD, and a photobook in a "special package".

== Track listing ==
Disc one
No.	Title	Length
1.	"Challenger" (previously unreleased)	5:33
2.	"Linear Motor Girl" (リニアモーターガール; Rinia Mōtā Gāru)	4:06
3.	"Computer City" (コンピューターシティ; Konpyūtā Shiti)	4:44
4.	"Electro World" (エレクトロ・ワールド; Erekutoro Wārudo)	3:53
5.	"Perfect Star Perfect Style" (パーフェクトスター・パーフェクトスタイル; Pāfekuto Sutā Pāfekuto Sutairu)	4:16
6.	"Chocolate Disco" (チョコレイト・ディスコ; Chokoreito Disuko)	3:46
7.	"Polyrhythm" (ポリリズム; Poririzumu)	4:11
8.	"Seventh Heaven"	4:45
9.	"Baby Cruising Love"	4:42
10.	"Macaroni" (マカロニ; Makaroni)	4:40
11.	"Game"	5:06
12.	"Secret Secret" (シークレットシークレット; Shīkuretto Shīkuretto)	4:57
13.	"Love the World"	4:35
14.	"Edge" (Triangle mix)	8:43
15.	"Dream Fighter"	4:54
16.	"One Room Disco" (ワンルーム・ディスコ; Wanrūmu Disuko)	5:06
Total length:		77:57

Disc two
No.	Title	Length
1.	"Night Flight"	5:21
2.	"I Still Love U"	4:33
3.	"Fushizen na Girl" (不自然なガール; Artificial Girl)	3:59
4.	"Natural ni Koishite" (ナチュラルに恋して; Fall in Love Naturally)	3:08
5.	"Voice"	4:13
6.	"Nee" (ねぇ; Hey)	4:27
7.	"Fake It"	4:12
8.	"Laser Beam" (レーザービーム; Rēzā Bīmu)	3:31
9.	"Kasuka na Kaori" (微かなカオリ; Faint Fragrance)	4:49
10.	"Spice" (スパイス; Supaisu)	3:52
11.	"My Color"	5:04
12.	"Spring of Life"	3:50
13.	"Spending All My Time"	3:54
14.	"Hurly Burly"	5:12
15.	"Mirai no Museum" (未来のミュージアム; Museum of the Future)	3:22
16.	"Daijyobanai" (だいじょばない; I'm Not Okay)	3:05
17.	"Magic of Love" (Level3 mix)	4:16
18.	"1mm"	4:18
Total length:		75:06

Disc three
No.	Title	Length
1.	"Party Maker"	7:21
2.	"Sweet Refrain"	4:55
3.	"Cling Cling"	4:18
4.	"Hold Your Hand"	3:36
5.	"Display"	3:49
6.	"Relax in the City"	4:12
7.	"Pick Me Up"	3:51
8.	"Star Train"	4:35
9.	"Story"	5:48
10.	"Flash"	4:37
11.	"Tokyo Girl" (remastered)	4:28
12.	"If You Wanna"	2:44
13.	"Everyday"	3:46
14.	"Mugenmirai" (無限未来; Infinite Future)	3:43
15.	"Fusion"	4:33
16.	"Future Pop"	3:03
17.	"Let Me Know"	3:26
18.	"Nananananairo" (ナナナナナイロ) (previously unreleased)	4:47
Total length:		77:32

Disc four (limited edition only)
No.	Title	Length
1.	"Future Pop" (video clip)	3:14
2.	"Perfume World Tour 4th "Future Pop" Digest Live Footage"	2:18
3.	"Start-Up" (World Tour 4th "Future Pop" Live)	1:16
4.	"Future Pop" (World Tour 4th "Future Pop" Live)	3:02
5.	"Electro World" (World Tour 4th "Future Pop" Live)	4:22
6.	"Pick Me Up" (World Tour 4th "Future Pop" Live)	4:02
7.	"MC" (World Tour 4th "Future Pop" Live)	2:06
8.	"Mugen Mirai" (World Tour 4th "Future Pop" Live)	4:10
9.	"Daijobanai" (Live from the Coachella Valley Music and Arts Festival)	3:09
10.	"Computer Grandma" (ETV 60 E-Uta♪ Kokoro no Daiboken)	2:22
11.	"Hamigaki Jyouzukana" (ETV 60 E-Uta♪ Kokoro no Daiboken)	1:26
12.	"Radio Because Perfume Just Likes Radio! 4"	72:35
Total length:		104:02

== Charts ==
=== Weekly charts ===
Chart (2019)	Peak position
Japanese Albums (Oricon)	1
Japanese Dance & Soul Albums (Oricon)	1
Japanese Hot Albums (Billboard Japan)	1

=== Year-end charts ===
Chart (2019)	Position
Japanese Albums (Oricon)	26

== Certifications ==
Region	Certification	Certified units/sales
Japan (RIAJ)	Gold	100,000^{^}
^{^} Shipments figures based on certification alone.
