= Love the World (album) =

Perfume Global Compilation "Love the World"

Compilation album by Perfume
- Released: September 12, 2012 (Japan); October 15, 2012 (Asia)
- Recorded: 2006–2011
- Genre: J-pop; dance-pop; electropop
- Length: 79:46
- Language: Japanese
- Label: Tokuma Japan Communications; Amuse, Inc.; UMG International
- Producer: Yasutaka Nakata

Perfume chronology
JPN (2011)	Perfume Global Compilation "Love the World" (2012)	LEVEL3 (2013)

Music video
- Perfume "Fake it" on YouTube

Love the World (distributed in some countries as Perfume Global Compilation "Love the World") is the second compilation album by the Japanese trio Perfume. It was released on September 12, 2012 in Japan under their old label Tokuma Japan Communications, in two editions: CD+DVD and in a regular CD edition.

All its songs were produced by Yasutaka Nakata, and the album was released in Asia on October 15, 2012 and also worldwide. The digital release of the album was on September 12, 2012 via iTunes worldwide, except for Asia.

== Background ==
The album was announced on the Perfume website on August 5, 2012. The physical version of the album is Perfume's first album to be released outside Japan, after having their first official global tour Perfume World Tour 1st that went to South Korea, Taiwan, Hong Kong and Singapore. The album was released in two editions: CD+DVD, the DVD including the music video of the song "Fake It", a making-of from the video and a special video of the song "Polyrhythm."

To promote the album, the music video of "Fake It" was released through Japan's music TV channels, such as MTV Japan, Music On! TV and Space Shower TV.

== Composition ==
The album is composed of sixteen tracks, including singles, b-sides, album tracks and two new mixes. All songs were produced by Yasutaka Nakata.

The songs "Polyrhythm", "Baby Cruising Love", "Chocolate Disco", "Game", "Butterfly" and "Secret Secret" are from the band's first album Game. "Electro World" is from their first compilation album Perfume: Complete Best; "Dream Fighter", "Love the World", "Edge" and "Night Flight" are from their second album Triangle; "Laser Beam", "My Color" and "Glitter" are from their third album JPN; "Seventh Heaven" is the b-side of the single "Polyrhythm"; and "Fake It" the b-side of the single "Nee".

== Track listing ==
All tracks are written by Yasutaka Nakata.

Standard edition
No.	Title	Length
1.	"Polyrhythm" (ポリリズム; Poririzumu)	4:09
2.	"Edge" (Triangle-mix; stylized as ⊿-Mix)	8:42
3.	"Love the World"	4:32
4.	"Electro World" (エレクトロ・ワールド; Erekutoro Wārudo)	4:19
5.	"Chocolate Disco" (2012-mix; チョコレイト・ディスコ; Chokoreito Disuko)	4:53
6.	"Seventh Heaven"	4:43
7.	"Game"	5:04
8.	"Secret Secret" (シークレットシークレット; Shīkuretto Shīkuretto)	4:56
9.	"Night Flight"	5:18
10.	"Baby Cruising Love"	4:40
11.	"Butterfly"	5:41
12.	"Fake It"	4:09
13.	"Laser Beam" (レーザービーム; Rēzā Bīmu)	3:29
14.	"Glitter"	5:03
15.	"My Color" (LTW-mix)	5:15
16.	"Dream Fighter"	4:53
Total length:		79:46

DVD (CD+DVD edition)
No.	Title	Length
1.	"Fake It" (music video)
2.	"Fake It" (music video – making-of)
3.	"Polyrhythm" (historical live act version)

== Chart performance ==
=== Oricon ===
Oricon Chart	Peak	Debut sales	Sales total
Daily Albums Chart	1	59,930	185,008+
Weekly Albums Chart	1	118,186	185,008+
Monthly Albums Chart	5	149,044	185,008+
Yearly Albums Chart	34	169,793	185,008+

=== Other charts ===
Chart	Peak position
Billboard Japan Top Albums	1

== Certifications ==
Region	Certification	Certified units/sales
Japan (RIAJ)	Platinum	250,000^{^}
^{^} Shipments figures based on certification alone.

== Release history ==
Country	Date	Format	Label
Japan	September 12, 2012	CD	Tokuma Japan Communications
Worldwide (except Asia)	September 12, 2012	Digital download	Amuse, Inc.
South Korea	October 15, 2012	CD, Digital download	UMG International
Taiwan	October 15, 2012	CD, Digital download	UMG International
Singapore	October 15, 2012	CD, Digital download	UMG International
Hong Kong	October 15, 2012	CD, Digital download	UMG International
Philippines	December 11, 2012	CD (import)	MCA Music
Worldwide	TBA	CD	Amuse, Inc.
