= Nebula Romance: Part II =

- Digital and regular edition cover

Studio album by Perfume
- Released: August 18, 2025 (digital); September 17, 2025 (physical)
- Recorded: 2023–2025
- Genre: J-pop; disco; synthwave
- Length: 38:12
- Label: Polydor; Perfume
- Producer: Yasutaka Nakata

Perfume chronology
Nebula Romance: Part I (2024)	Nebula Romance: Part II (2025)

Singles from Nebula Romance: Part II
- 1. "Moon" Released: September 6, 2023; 2. "Human Factory -Denzō Ningen-" Released: February 7, 2025 (digital); 3. "Nebula Romance" Released: April 2, 2025 (digital); 4. "Meguloop" Released: July 10, 2025 (digital)

Nebula Romance: Part II (Japanese: ネビュラロマンス 後篇, Hepburn: Nebyura Romansu Kōhen) is the ninth studio album and second concept album by Japanese music group Perfume. It was released digitally on August 18, 2025, and on physical formats on September 17, 2025, via Polydor Records and Perfume Records.

== Background and development ==
Nebula Romance: Part II completes the two-part concept album initiated with Nebula Romance: Part I to mark Perfume's twentieth anniversary of their major label debut on September 21, 2005, and their twenty-fifth anniversary since their formation in 2000. While the first part focused on a grand cosmic drama, the second part portrays Perfume's progression into a new dimension and serves as the narrative conclusion of the narrative of a fictional sci-fi movie soundtrack.

The creative process behind the two-part album was largely shaped by producer Yasutaka Nakata, with the group members having minimal involvement in its initial development. Nakata crafted the album as a sci-fi narrative soundtrack, with the members discovering the full scope of its story only after its completion. Ayano Omoto (Nocchi) commented on the group's limited insight into Nakata’s vision, stating, “We asked Nakata-san if we could do something where the dots in our career would connect… and then he came back with this two-part album concept and story, which totally surprised us.” She further highlighted their reactive role in the process, noting, “Just as the fans are imagining things while listening to the album, we’re also having fun guessing what Nakata-san means by what he creates. We’re like, ‘Is this what it’s about?’” Unlike previous projects where Nakata was present during recording sessions to provide real-time feedback, the production for Nebula Romance saw him focusing solely on creation, delivering detailed demos with explicit instructions for the trio. These demos outlined specific vocal techniques, including chorus layering, cut-off points, and vibrato usage. A director oversaw the recording process, ensuring the vocals emphasized the members’ individual voices with minimal effects. Group member Ayaka Nishiwaki (A-chan) expressed her surprise upon realizing that her vibratos were kept in the final versions of the songs, stating: "Usually, any vibrato or emotional bits get cut, but Nakata kept those parts where my love for singing came through. I was like, “Wow, Nakata-san has a heart!”".

The album sound evolves through influences from the 1970s, 1980s, and 1990s, with melodies that carry a nostalgic feel. Group member Yuka Kashino (Kashiyuka) described the album as Perfume's "most conceptual yet nostalgic" album to date.

== Promotion ==
The album was preceded by the single "Moon" released in 2023, as well as "Human Factory -Denzō Ningen-", "Nebula Romance", and "Meguloop", released as digital singles in 2025. "Moon" was used as theme song for the Fuji TV drama Barakamon; "Human Factory -Denzō Ningen-" was used as theme song for the film Showtime 7; "Nebula Romance" was used as the main track for the NTT Pavilion at Expo 2025 in Osaka; "Meguloop" was used as theme song for the drama Chihayafuru: Meguri. Additionally, the album track "Solar Wind" was used as a commercial song for Bandai's Gundam Card Game.

== Track listing ==
All tracks are written by Yasutaka Nakata.

Nebula Romance: Part II track listing
No.	Title	Length
1.	"Cipher"	2:03
2.	"Saikidō Sekai" (再起動世界)	3:26
3.	"Nebula Romance" (ネビュラロマンス)	4:00
4.	"Solar Wind" (ソーラ・ウィンド)	4:15
5.	"Virtual Fantasy"	3:42
6.	"Teenage Dreams"	4:23
7.	"Human Factory (Denzō Ningen)" (Human Factory -電造人間-)	4:04
8.	"Moon"	3:01
9.	"Exit"	5:05
10.	"Meguloop" (巡ループ)	4:12
Total length:		38:12

== Charts ==
=== Weekly charts ===
Weekly chart performance for Nebula Romance: Part II
Chart (2025)	Peak position
Japanese Albums (Oricon)	3
Japanese Combined Albums (Oricon)	4
Japanese Hot Albums (Billboard Japan)	13

=== Monthly charts ===
Monthly chart performance for Nebula Romance: Part II
Chart (2025)	Position
Japanese Albums (Oricon)	13

=== Year-end charts ===
Year-end chart performance for Nebula Romance: Part II
Chart (2025)	Position
Japanese Download Albums (Billboard Japan)	43
