= Monochrome Effect =

"Monochrome Effect (モノクロームエフェクト)"

Single by Perfume

from the album Perfume: Complete Best
- A-side: "Monochrome Effect"
- B-side: "Elevator"; "Oishii Recipe"
- Released: March 17, 2004
- Recorded: 2003–2004
- Genre: J-pop, chiptune, bitpop, synthpop
- Length: 4:17
- Label: Bee-Hive Records
- Songwriter(s): Emi Kinoko, Yasutaka Nakata
- Producer(s): Yasutaka Nakata

Perfume singles chronology
"Sweet Donuts" (2003)	"Monochrome Effect (モノクロームエフェクト)" (2004)	"Vitamin Drop" (2004)

"Monochrome Effect" (モノクロームエフェクト, Monokurōmu Efekuto) is the fourth single released by the Japanese techno-pop group, Perfume.

Monochrome Effect is Perfume's second single after being signed to Bee-Hive Records, and fourth overall. Since their 2005 major debut, the single has gone out of print and is incredibly hard to find. It can be found on auction sites for more than five times its original price. In February 2008, the single was re-released with a new cover and included in the "Fan Service ~Prima Box~" CD+DVD boxset.

This single reached #117 on the Oricon charts, charted for one week and sold 1,018 copies.

This single and accompanying music video were the first to feature the distinctive "Perfume" logo designed by Kazuaki Seki. Seki also worked as art director on the latter and would go on to direct the majority of Perfume's music videos following their major-label debut. He would later say of the group, "Perhaps it's an exaggeration, but they're the artist that changed my life."

The song was featured in the "May the Best Stan Win" episode of the American TV show American Dad! where a future cyborg version of Stan Smith refers to it as "Japanese Funk from the future". Since then, the news has hit many Japanese news sites as well as a few North American ones.

== Track list ==
1. "Monochrome Effect" (モノクロームエフェクト)
2. "Elevator" (エレベーター)
3. "Oishii Recipe" (おいしいレシピ; Delicious Recipe)
