= Sweet Donuts =

Single by Perfume

"Sweet Donuts (スウィートドーナッツ)"

Single by Perfume

from the album Perfume: Complete Best
- A-side: "Sweet Donuts"
- B-side: "Secret Message"; "Jenny wa Gokigen Naname"
- Released: August 6, 2003
- Recorded: 2003
- Genre: J-pop; techno; synth-pop; bitpop; chiptune
- Length: 2:57
- Label: Bee-Hive Records
- Songwriters: Emi Kinoko, Yasutaka Nakata
- Producer: Yasutaka Nakata

Perfume singles chronology
"Kareshi Boshūchū" (2002)	"Sweet Donuts (スウィートドーナッツ)" (2003)	"Monochrome Effect" (2004)

"Sweet Donuts" (スウィートドーナッツ, Suwīto Dōnattsu) is the third single released by the Japanese techno-pop group Perfume, and the first single in which they were produced by Yasutaka Nakata. It appears as a track on the group's debut album, Perfume: Complete Best.

== Releases ==
Since their 2005 major debut, the original single has been difficult to find and can be found on auction sites for more than double its original price. In February 2008, it was re-released and included in the "Fan Service -Prima Box-" CD+DVD boxset.

== B-sides ==
The cover of "Jenny wa Gokigen Naname" became one of Perfume's staple songs, being performed on many of their major tours.

== CD track listing ==
1. Sweet Donuts (スウィートドーナッツ, Suwīto Dōnattsu)
2. Secret Message (シークレットメッセージ, Shīkuretto Messēji)
3. Jenny wa Gokigen Naname (ジェニーはご機嫌ななめ, Jenī wa Gokigen Naname; Jenny is Displeased)
- Note: "Jenny wa Gokigen Naname" is a cover and was originally released by Juicy Fruits on June 1, 1980.
