= Perfume: Complete Best =

- Cardboard sleeve and digital artwork.

Compilation album by Perfume
- Released: August 2, 2006; February 14, 2007 (re-release)
- Recorded: 2003–2006; Contemode Studio, Tokyo, Japan
- Genre: J-pop
- Length: 50:47
- Label: Tokuma Japan Communications
- Producer: Yasutaka Nakata

Perfume chronology
Perfume: Complete Best (2006)	Game (2008)

Singles from Perfume: Complete Best
- 1. "Linear Motor Girl" Released: September 21, 2005; 2. "Computer City" Released: January 11, 2006; 3. "Electro World" Released: June 28, 2006

Perfume: Complete Best (stylized as Perfume ~Complete Best~) is the first greatest hits album (Note: Perfume (Complete Best) is officially considered to be the first studio album by the group according to their management Amuse and their then-record label Tokuma Japan Communications. However, this is technically Perfume's first greatest hits album or compilation album, compiling their singles and at least one B-side track from them overall, from Sweet Donuts (2003) up to Electro World (2006).) by Japanese girl group Perfume. It was released on August 2, 2006 by Tokuma Japan Communications. The greatest hits album includes work released from their previous record label Bee-hive Records, and previous work with Tokuma Japan Communications. The album also included b-side and one newly recorded track. It was released in three different formats; a CD and DVD bundle, a digital release, and a double 12-inch vinyl LP. The LP was released through Perfume's February 2016 box set Perfume Complete LP Box, and a singular limited release.

Upon its release, Perfume: Complete Best was met with generally positive reviews from music critics. Many critics admitted their disapproval of the album's material at first, but retrospectively commended the album's composition and production. Commercially, Perfume: Complete Best was a moderate success. The album reached number 33 on Japan's Oricon Albums Chart, whilst a limited edition reached number 66. After Perfume's 2008 debut studio album Game reached the top of the Oricon Albums Chart, Perfume: Complete Best reached number 25 on the same chart.

== Background ==
In 2003, following their graduation from the Actors School in Hiroshima, Perfume moved to Tokyo to further establish themselves as a musical project. There, they became a part of Bee-Hive and signed with the management office Amuse, Inc. In Tokyo, they met Japanese producer and Capsule member Yasutaka Nakata; Bee-Hive later hired Nakata to produce the groups beginning material. Between the years of 2003 and 2004, Nakata produced three singles; "Sweet Donuts", "Monochrome Effect", and "Vitamin Drop" under Bee-Hive Records. Commercially, none of the singles were particularly successful prior to their release, barely scraping the top 100 on Japan's Oricon Singles Chart.

Because of the lack of success from the first three singles, Bee-Hive Records decided to release Perfume and give them to Tokuma Japan Communications for bigger prospects. Working with Nakata through Tokuma Japan Communications and Contemode (his label with Yahama Music Communications), the collaboration spawned a series of singles including "Linear Motor Girl", "Computer City", and "Electro World". The result was slightly more successful, giving Perfume their first three top 100 singles and one top 50 with "Computer City". In July 2006, Perfume confirmed they would release a compilation album consisting of one new recording, plus their previous work.

== Composition ==
Perfume: Complete Best is an electronic dance album that borrows numerous musical elements including technopop, electro house and J-pop. According to staff reviews from CD Journal and Greg from Selective Hearing, every track includes electronic music elements; Greg commented "Everything but the last track is an uptempo, happy pop kind of song. You figure hearing 11 tracks of that kind of music would be annoying but it’s not. There’s enough variety in each track to make the journey worthwhile." Perfume: Complete Best includes singles released from their previous record label Bee-hive Records ("Sweet Donuts", "Monochrome Effect", "Vitamin Drop"), and previous work with Tokuma Japan Communications ("Linear Motor Girl", "Computer City", "Electro World"). The album features four b-side tracks from their previous singles; "Inryoku", "Foundation", "Computer Driving", "Perfume", and "Wonder2", and one new song; "Perfect Star Perfect Style".

== Release and packaging ==
Perfume: Complete Best was released in three different formats on August 2, 2006 by Tokuma Japan Communications. The CD and DVD format features the twelve tracks in a jewel case and a bonus DVD that includes music videos to "Linear Motor Girl", "Computer City", "Electro World", and "Vitamin Drop". First press editions including an obi and a cardboard sleeve case. A limited edition CD and DVD format features the twelve tracks, and a bonus DVD includes music videos to "Linear Motor Girl", "Computer City", "Electro World", and "Vitamin Drop". It was published in a jewel case with some editions with a cardboard sleeve; First press editions included an obi. The final format was a digital release that was released in Japan only on that same release date. One cover sleeve for Perfume: Complete Best has Perfume inside a white room, posing towards the camera. This booklet was featured on all three formats.

In February 2012, the group had signed a record contract with Universal Music Japan after leaving Tokuma Japan Communications to record their third album JPN. They signed a global record contract with Universal Music Group to release JPN globally, but received rights by Tokuma Communications to release their discography globally, and Perfume: Complete Best was subsequently released worldwide in March 2012 digitally. In November 2015, Perfume and Universal (with publishing rights from Tokuma and Crown Tokuma) announced the re-release of all their studio albums, including Perfume: Complete Best, in the form of vinyl LPs in a collective 0box set. The LP edition of Perfume: Complete Best was released in two editions; part of the box set entitled Perfume Complete LP Box, and a limited edition singular release on February 17, 2016.

== Critical reception ==
Professional ratings
Review scores
Source	Rating
Amazon Japan	(positive)
CDJournal	(positive)
Channel-Ai	3.5/5 stars
Selective Hearing	(positive)

Perfume: Complete Best received favourable reviews from most music critics. A reviewer from Channel-Ai awarded the album three-and-a-half stars out of five. The reviewer stated "For people who just can’t stand techno, Perfume won’t be to their liking no matter how catchy the songs are. However, for those who find electronica tolerable or enjoyable, Perfume will be a group to their liking." The reviewer concluded, "Even though it is a best of collection, the album has a sense of continuity. Despite having misses in this album, particularly amongst the not so stellar b-sides included, Perfume: Complete Best remains an [sic] unique and enjoyable j-pop experience." A reviewer from CD Journal was positive, who commended the album's different mixture of genres and the groups "techno-idol" image.

Greg from Selective Hearing was fairly positive, though he stated "I only have one issue with this group. That has to do with the processed vocals in some of the songs. When the effect is on I can’t really tell who’s singing. I find it a little distracting, but not enough to make me hit the stop button." In conclusion, he stated "This is a great album & a perfect introduction to their music. I’m glad I gave them another shot." A reviewer from Amazon Japan was positive, who highlighted "Linear Motor Girl", "Computer City", and "Electro World" as the album's best tracks.

== Commercial performances ==
The standard format of Perfume: Complete Best debuted at number 53 on the Japanese Daily Oricon Albums Chart. This resulted in the album debuting at number 66 the Japanese Weekly Oricon Albums Chart. The album lasted four weeks in the top 300 chart, and sold an estimated 6,672 by 2006. After Perfume's 2008 debut studio album Game reached the top of the Oricon Albums Chart, Perfume: Complete Best reached number 25 on the same chart. The album spent over 100 weeks in the top 300 chart, and sold over 170,000 units by 2008. Recognized as a single release by the Recording Industry Association of Japan (RIAJ), Perfume: Complete Best sold over 177,000 units in Japan and was certified platinum by RIAJ for physical shipments of 250,000 units in that region.

== Concert tours ==
Whilst promoting Game and amidst its 2008 release, Perfume went on two promotional tours to promote both Game and Perfume: Complete Best; the Seventh Heaven tour at the Liquidroom in Japan, and the Perfume Socks Fix Makes Tour in Shibyua, Tokyo. For the Seventh Heaven tour, the album tracks: "Computer Driving", "Computer City", "Perfect Star Perfect Style", "Sweet Donuts", "Perfume", "Wonder2", and other tracks "Oishii Recipe", "Imitation World", "Counter Attraction", "Kareshi Boshuuchuu", "Jenny wa Gokigen Naname", and "Attraction" were included on the set list. The tour received positive reviews from music critics; Tetuso Hiraga from Hot Express commended the tour, praising certain tracks and the overall stage production. For the Socks Fix Makes, the album tracks: "Electro World", "Sweet Donuts", "Foundation", "Perfect Star Perfect Style", "Computer City", "Perfume", "Wonder2", and the b-side tracks "Oishii Recipe", and "Imitation World" were included on the set list. The tour received positive reviews from music critics; Hiraga felt the Shibuya concert was an improvement from the Seventh Heaven tour, and commended the sufficiency in material.

== Track listing ==
All tracks are written by Yasutaka Nakata; lyrics for tracks 2, 5, 6, 7, 8, 9, 10 and 11 by Emi Kinoko.

CD
No.	Title	Length
1.	"Perfect Star Perfect Style" (パーフェクトスター・パーフェクトスタイル; Pāfekuto Sutā Pāfekuto Sutairu)	4:18
2.	"Linear Motor Girl" (リニアモーターガール; Rinia Mōtā Gāru)	4:07
3.	"Computer City" (コンピューターシティ; Konpyūtā Shiti)	4:45
4.	"Electro World" (エレクトロ・ワールド; Erekutoro Wārudo)	4:21
5.	"Inryoku" (引力; Inryoku)	3:35
6.	"Monochrome Effect" (モノクロームエフェクト; Monokurōmu Efekuto)	4:17
7.	"Vitamin Drop" (ビタミンドロップ; Bitamin Doroppu)	4:55
8.	"Sweet Donuts" (スウィートドーナッツ; Suwīto Dōnattsu)	2:57
9.	"Foundation" (ファンデーション; Fandēshon)	3:57
10.	"Computer Driving" (コンピュータードライビング; Konpyūtā Doraibingu)	4:26
11.	"Perfume"	5:15
12.	"Wonder2"	3:49
Total length:		50:42

Regular edition DVD
No.	Title	Length
1.	"Linear Motor Girl"	4:31
2.	"Computer City"	3:43
3.	"Electro World"	4:06
4.	"Vitamin Drop"	4:01
Total length:		67:03

Limited edition DVD
No.	Title	Length
1.	"Linear Motor Girl"	4:31
2.	"Computer City"	3:43
3.	"Electro World"	4:06
4.	"Monochrome Effect"	4:29
Total length:		67:31

=== All formats ===
- Standard CD and DVD – Consists of twelve songs on one disc, and four music videos.
- First pressing standard CD and DVD – Consists of twelve songs on one disc, and four music videos. First pressing issues include a bonus obi strip and a cardboard sleeve case.
- Limited CD and DVD – Consists of twelve songs on one disc, and four different music videos.
- First pressing limited CD and DVD – Consists of twelve songs on one disc, and four different music videos. First pressing issues include a bonus obi strip and a cardboard sleeve case.
- LP – Consists of six tracks on one vinyl disc, and another six tracks on the second.
- Digital download – Consists of twelve songs on one disc.

== Credits and personnel ==
Credits adapted from the liner notes of Perfume: Complete Best.

- Ayano Ōmoto (Nocchi) – lead vocals, background vocals
- Ayaka Nishiwaki (A-Chan) – lead vocals, background vocals
- Yuka Kashino (Kashiyuka) – lead vocals, background vocals
- Yasutaka Nakata – song writing, producing, composing, arranging, engineer, mixing, recorded by
- Emi Kinoko – song writing
- Bee-Hive Records – Perfume's previous record label
- Tokuma Japan Communications – Perfume's distribution and record label
- Universal Music Japan – Perfume's 2012–present label; distribution co-rights
- Contemode – Nakata's distribution label, co-rights
- Yamaha Music Communications – Nakata's distribution label, co-rights

== Charts ==
Chart (2006–2009)	Peak position
Japan Daily Albums Chart (Oricon)	15
Japan Weekly Albums Chart (Oricon)	24
Japan Monthly Albums Chart (Oricon)	36

== Certifications ==
Region	Certification	Certified units/sales
Japan (RIAJ)	Platinum	250,000^{^}
^{^} Shipments figures based on certification alone.
