= Perfume (Japanese band) =

Japanese pop girl group

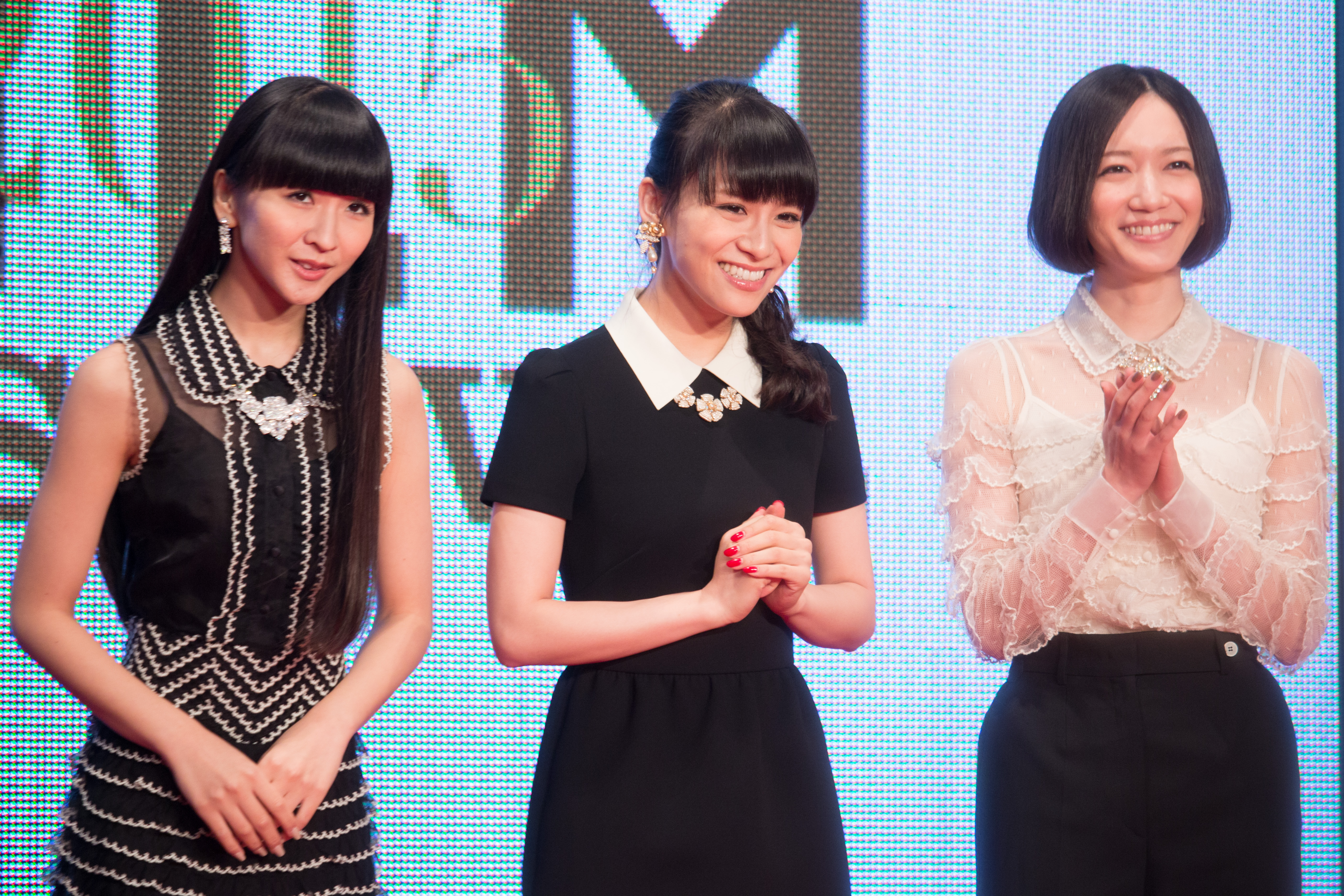
- Perfume at the 28th Tokyo International Film Festival (2015). From left to right: Kashiyuka, A-chan and Nocchi.

Background information
- Origin: Hiroshima Prefecture, Japan
- Genres: J-pop; techno; bitpop; electropop; dance-pop; synthpop
- Works: Perfume discography
- Years active: 2000–present (on hiatus as of 2026)
- Labels: Momiji; Bee-hive; Tokuma Japan; Universal J; Perfume; Polydor
- Members: Ayano Ōmoto ("Nocchi"); Yuka Kashino ("Kashiyuka"); Ayaka Nishiwaki ("A-chan")
- Past members: Yuka Kawashima
- Website: perfume-web.jp

Perfume (パフューム, Pafyūmu) is a Japanese girl group consisting of Nocchi, Kashiyuka, and A-chan. The group formed in 2000 in Hiroshima, Japan, then moved three years later to Tokyo, where they worked with producer Yasutaka Nakata, who created a technopop identity for the group. Their performances are noted for their choreography and incorporation of technology with futuristic imagery, and Perfume has emerged as one of the most successful Japanese girl groups.

After a slew of indie singles, Perfume made their major label debut with "Linear Motor Girl" on Tokuma Japan in 2005. Their early releases, including Perfume: Complete Best (2006), were met with modest commercial reception, before a breakthrough in 2007 with the single "Polyrhythm". Their debut studio album, Game (2008), began a streak of nine consecutive number-one albums. Perfume's next album, Triangle (2009), produced the number-one singles "Love the World" and "One Room Disco".

Perfume's early music was marked by a post-Shibuya-kei sound; the group later moved towards contemporary electronic dance music, incorporating elements of bitpop, techno, and house music. The group is known for heavily processed vocals with autotune and vocoders. Their best-known songs include "Electro World", "Chocolate Disco", "Dream Fighter", and "Laser Beam".

In 2012, Perfume signed with Universal Music Group to expand their international reach, beginning with their fourth studio album, Level3 (2013). Later singles include "Flash" and "Tokyo Girl". The group released Nebula Romance: Part I in 2024 and Nebula Romance: Part II in 2025 as a two-part concept album in honor of their 25th anniversary.

On September 21, 2025, the group announced that they would go on hiatus by the end of the year.

== Name ==
Perfume's logo (2004–present)

Because Ayaka Nishiwaki ("A-chan"), Yuka Kashino ("Kashiyuka"), and Yuka Kawashima ("Kawayuka") had the same Japanese kanji character for 香 (ka / kaori, fragrance) in their names, they named the group "Perfume" (kousui (香水) in Japanese). The original name was "ぱふゅ〜む" or "ぱふゅ→む" written in hiragana with thirteen strokes. Nishiwaki stated that they wished to follow the success of four-member dance group Speed (thirteen strokes in uppercase), who trained at Okinawa Actors School.

Due to Kawashima's exit and Ōmoto's entry, they gave a new meaning to this name. When asked why they chose it, Nishiwaki replied, "The fragrance of perfume can soothe your feelings or make you feel happy. We aspire to be such artists."

In spring 2003, they moved to Tokyo and joined the management agency Amuse Inc. The management changed the group name to English. They wanted to keep the hiragana name associated with their heroines, Speed, but eventually acquiesced. Ōmoto later said, "The powers-that-be are scary."

== History ==
=== 2000–2003: Formation, early career development and local recognition in Hiroshima ===
In 2000, Nishiwaki, Kashino, and Kawashima voluntarily formed the group inside young talent academy Actors School Hiroshima (ASH), which was run by TSS Production, a subsidiary of TSS-TV Co., Ltd. (formerly called Shinhiroshima Telecasting), and also had a deep relationship with the Tokyo-based management company Amuse Inc. Before the group could even debut, Kawashima decided to pull out of the project to focus on her studies (and later formed another group called Pinkies). Nishiwaki set out to find a replacement, and Ayano Ōmoto ("Nocchi") joined as the third member. The three girls attended ASH as part of the inaugural class of 2000. While Kashino, Kawashima and Nishiwaki were all in the beginner's class, Ōmoto was in the advanced class for her vocal abilities.

In March 2002, Perfume debuted in Hiroshima with the single "Omajinai Perori". They followed up the release with "Kareshi Boshūchū" in November of that same year. Both singles were sold in Hiroshima under Momiji Label, which was operated jointly by ASH and Amuse. Around this time they also met Mikiko, the choreographer who would coordinate all of the group's dances from this point forward.

=== 2003–2005: Bee-Hive era in Tokyo ===
In 2003, following their graduation from Actors School Hiroshima, the trio moved to Tokyo. There, they became a part of Bee-Hive and met Capsule's Yasutaka Nakata who would become their music producer. Between the years of 2003 and 2004, they released "Sweet Donuts", "Monochrome Effect", and "Vitamin Drop" under the indie record label Bee-Hive Records. It was also during this time that they had their first three live performances. Though none of their releases became a hit, their management company chose to give Perfume a major debut.

From 2004 autumn to 2005 summer, Perfume temporarily set Akihabara as their home ground. They collaborated with voice actress and singer Haruko Momoi providing vocals to her song "Akihabalove", which was produced by her under the alias DJ Momo-i. The song was released on a DVD along with the promotional video. They sometimes held surprise live street performances there, and they used to be considered as "Akiba-kei idols" until the release of their debut album, Game.

=== 2005–2007: New record label and Complete Best ===
On September 21, 2005, Perfume made its major label debut under the label Tokuma Japan Communications. They released "Linear Motor Girl", which charted on the Oricon charts at number 99. Two singles, "Computer City" and "Electro World", followed in 2006. On August 2, 2006, Perfume released Perfume: Complete Best along with a new track, "Perfect Star Perfect Style". The album reached number 33 on the Oricon charts (later climbing up as high as number 25 with the release of Perfume's second album, Game).

On December 20, 2006, Perfume released an exclusive download song, "Twinkle Snow Powdery Snow". The song later appeared on their single, "Fan Service: Sweet". On December 21, 2006, Perfume had a live concert at Harajuku Astro Hall which was later recorded and released as Fan Service: Bitter.

=== 2007–2008: Commercial success and Game era ===
While almost all of the other Bee-Hive members were getting dropped by Amuse Inc., Perfume was given the opportunity to release another single. In February 2007, they released "Fan Service: Sweet" featuring the fun dance track "Chocolate Disco". This was a turning point for Perfume in which their luck began to change. Although the sales for "Fan Service [sweet]" were not stellar, "Chocolate Disco" did catch the attention of an already well-established artist in the J-pop industry, Kimura Kaela. Kimura then played Perfume's music on her radio show consistently. While listening to Kimura's radio show, a commercial director named Akira Tomotsugi noticed Perfume and decided to use the three girls in an upcoming TV ad. On July 1, the commercial for NHK's national recycling campaign aired, featuring Perfume and a new song, "Polyrhythm". The commercial gave Perfume immense exposure. Subsequently, their next live show sold out, and Perfume became the first idol group to perform at the Summer Sonic Festival. On September 12, 2007, Perfume officially released their tenth single, "Polyrhythm". It reached number 4 on the Oricon daily single charts and climbed as high as number 7 on the weekly charts.

In 2008, the group followed up the success of "Polyrhythm" with "Baby Cruising Love / Macaroni". The single reached number 3 on the Oricon weekly charts and sold 50,000 copies. On April 16, 2008, Perfume released their first original album, Game. Game reached number 1 on the Oricon charts upon its release, making Perfume the first technopop group to achieve this since Yellow Magic Orchestra's Naughty Boys in 1983. At the time of the album's release, Perfume: Complete Best, "Polyrhythm", and "Baby Cruising Love / Macaroni" all re-entered the Oricon charts. The album went on to sell over 450,000 copies and is certified double platinum. After the album's release, Perfume First Tour Game was announced. The group toured 10 cities and sold out all tickets. On the final date of the tour, Perfume announced that they would be doing a 2-day show at the prestigious Nippon Budokan in November 2008 as well as the release date of their next single, "Love the World".

=== 2008–2009: Triangle era ===
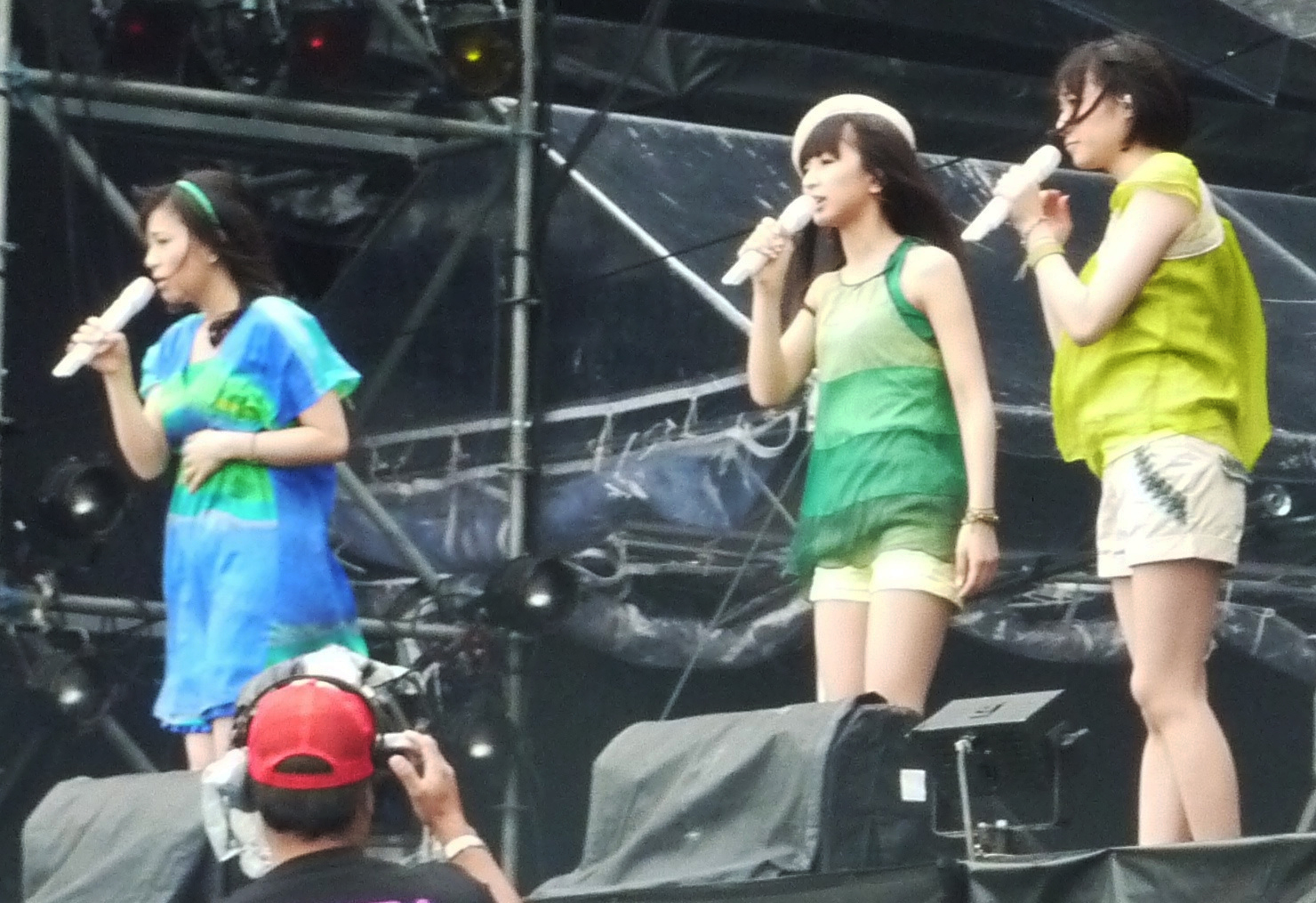
Perfume performing at the Rock in Japan Festival (July 31, 2009)

"Love the World" was released on July 9, 2008. It became the first technopop song ever to reach number 1 on the Oricon charts. In October 2008, the Perfume First Tour "Game" DVD was announced. Upon its release, it beat prominent artists like Koda Kumi and Namie Amuro for the number 1 spot. Perfume then performed at Budokan for 2 days, November 6 and 7. On the second show, titled "BudoukaaaaaaaaaaN!!!!!", they announced a show at yet another famous venue, Yoyogi National Gymnasium titled "Disco!Disco!Disco!", which was a tour that was one of the few never to be released on DVD or Blu-ray, although a few of the songs performed can be seen on the extra footage included in the Triangle Album + DVD set.

2008 ended with the release of their 13th single, "Dream Fighter", which reached number 2 on the charts. They were also chosen to sing at NHK's 59th Kōhaku Uta Gassen, the prestigious end of the year live TV program. On April 18, 2008 Perfume made a special guest appearance performing "Ceramic Girl" at the ending scene of the drama "Sumire 16 sai!!". The music was theme of the drama, and the DVD of the Game album included the "Ceramic Girl: Drama Another Version" music video with scenes from the drama.

On March 25, 2009, Perfume released their 14th single, "One Room Disco". The single reached number 1 in the charts. In April 2009, Perfume began broadcast of a comedy sketch program titled Perfume's Chandelier House. On July 8, 2009, the group released its "80s-themed" third album, ⊿. The album was another number-one hit for Perfume, selling over 300,000 copies. Perfume then went on their second nationwide tour in order to promote the album.

=== 2010–2011: Overseas activities and recognition; JPN era ===
In 2010, Perfume released "Fushizen na Girl / Natural ni Koishite", which reached number 2 in the charts. They went on a fanclub-exclusive tour, titled Perfume 10th Anniversary Fan Club Tour and also announced that they would be having a show at Tokyo Dome titled "1 2 3 4 5 6 7 8 9 10 11". In June, Perfume took part in a commercial for a Pepsi NEX campaign in Japan. In that commercial, they covered a short segment of Lovefool by The Cardigans. On August 11, 2010, Perfume celebrated their 10th anniversary with the release of their 16th single, "Voice", which was used in a Nissan advert. Perfume's show at the Tokyo Dome as part of their 10-year anniversary marked only the second time an all-female group had held a concert at the venue since Speed. Tickets for the show were sold out on the day tickets were released. The demand for the tickets was so high that extra, unplanned seats were added. Perfume performed to 50,000 fans. At the end of the show, it was announced that Perfume would attend the Mnet Asian Music Awards (a Korean music-based award show that was taking place in Macau that year), as one of the representatives for Japan alongside R&B duo Chemistry. It was to be Perfume's first overseas performance. After the concert, a new single titled "Nee" was released on November 10, 2010, and like "Natural ni Koishite", it was a tie-up with Japanese apparel brand "Natural Beauty Basic". The single debuted at number 2 with first-week sales of 85,164, their highest first-week singles sales to date. On November 28, 2010, Perfume received the "Best Asia Artist Award" at the Mnet Asian Music Awards in Macau and later on performed "Nee" and "Chocolate Disco". The DVD of the "1 2 3 4 5 6 7 8 9 10 11" live performance at Tokyo Dome was released on February 9, 2011. Since February 2, 2011 a new song "Laser Beam" was featured in the adverts titled "Hyōketsu Dance" and "Hyōketsu Ice Music" for Kirin's chūhai drinks. Though it was announced on March 3, 2011 that their next single would be released on April 20, 2011, the official site announced on April 1, 2011, that the new single would be a double A-side single of "Laser Beam/Kasuka na Kaori" and the release was suspended until May 5, 2011, due to the 2011 eastern Japan earthquake. The new release date of the single was then set to be on May 18, 2011.

In 2011, their hit song "Polyrhythm" was featured in Pixar's movie Cars 2. The song was also on the film's soundtrack. Perfume was invited to and attended the world premiere of Cars 2 in Los Angeles on June 18, 2011. When the movie was released, Perfume's popularity began to skyrocket. Also, Perfume did a second TV commercial for Kirin, "Hyōketsu Sparkling" featuring a new song, "Glitter". On September 5, Perfume announced that they would be releasing their fourth album, JPN on November 30, 2011. Before the record was to be released, they released the new single "Spice" on November 2, 2011, which is the lead single for the album and includes the song "Glitter" from their recent Kirin commercial tie-up. On October 15, Perfume and Japanese co-ed band AAA represented Japan as performers for the 2011 Asia Song Festival which was held in Daegu, South Korea. They performed alongside Korean acts Super Junior, Girls' Generation, Beast and Lee Seung-gi, Chinese singers Bibi Zhou and Leo Ku, Taiwanese singer Peter Ho and Thai singer Tata Young.

=== 2012: Label change and international expansion ===
On February 28, it was announced the group had transferred to Universal Music Japan to start working overseas. It was also announced that the group would release their latest album, JPN, on iTunes in 50 countries and launch an official global website on March 6. On the same day, Universal Japan announced that the group would be managed by the label Universal J, the same label of singer-fashion designer Meg, who was also produced by Yasutaka Nakata.

On March 7, 2012, Perfume announced that they had signed a global contract with Universal Music Group. A day after, March 8, 2012, the group announced the April 11 release of the single "Spring of Life". The title track was used as a Kirin advertisement for "Hyōketsu Magical Music". This marks the group's first single to be released under their new record label. On March 23, 2012, Perfume made a special guest appearance performing "Baby Cruising Love" in the movie Moteki.

On May 18, 2012, Perfume gave their first English interview to the Japan Times Online. In it, they discussed K-pop, their move from Tokuma Japan to Universal Music and coming to the United States for the first time and their desire to perform internationally. Perfume and their management intend to present the group 'as is' internationally rather than adapting them to fit the market like previous attempts by Asian artists to break the international market. This was backed up when the group's latest album JPN was released in various Asian markets physically.

The group hosted the MTV Video Music Awards Japan 2012 which was held in Chiba at Makuhari Messe Hall on June 23. On July 23, 2012, Perfume made two announcements, one of which was that they had their first tour outside Japan, in places such as Hong Kong, Taiwan, Korea, and Singapore. The second announcement was that they were releasing a new compilation album set for a global release named Perfume Global Compilation "Love the World", which was published on September 12, 2012.

The group also represented Japan at the first ABU TV Song Festival 2012 which was scheduled at the KBS Concert Hall, in Seoul, South Korea on October 14, 2012.

=== 2013: International breakthrough and Level3 ===
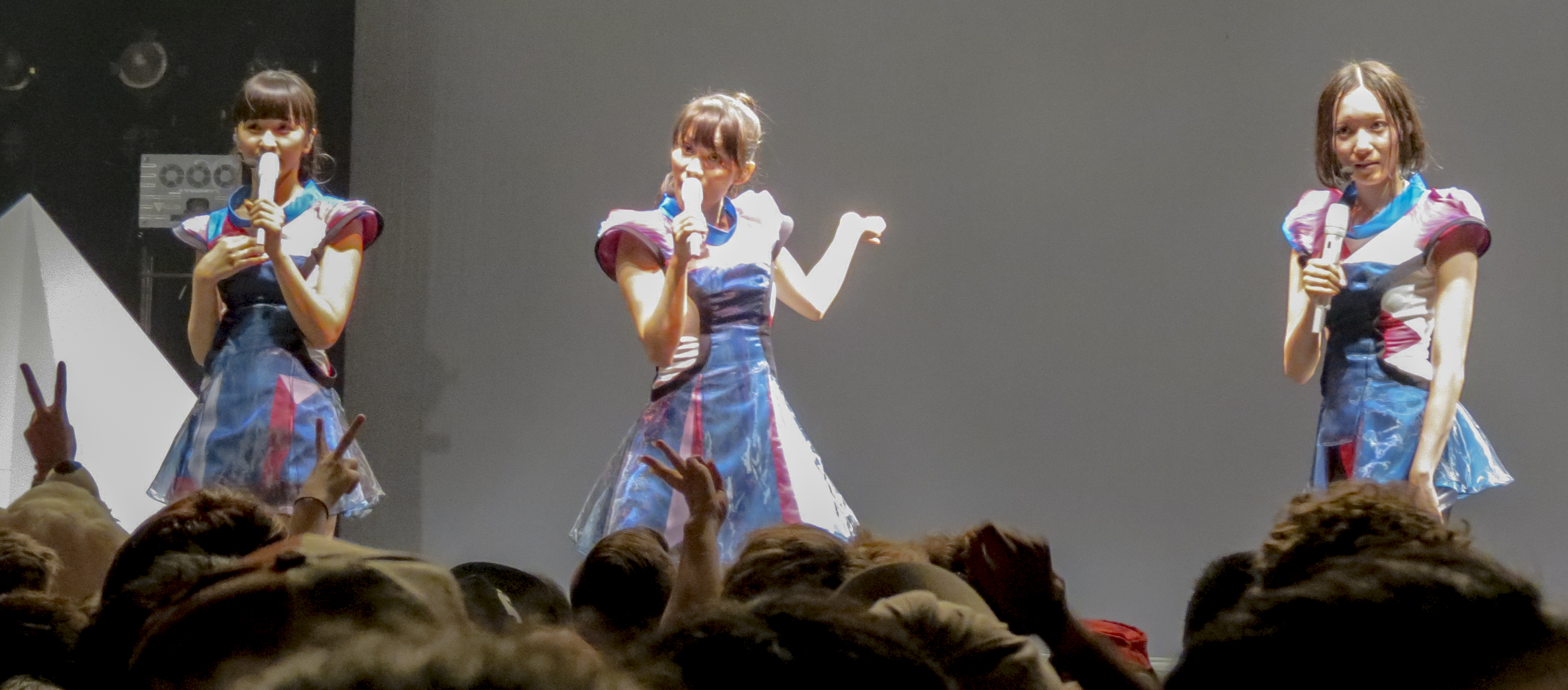
Perfume performing on stage in July 2013

On February 27, 2013, Perfume released their 17th single, entitled "Mirai no Museum". The title track was used as theme song for the Doraemon film, Nobita no Himitsu Dōgu Museum. The single peaked at number 2 on the Oricon charts, becoming the group's 12th consecutive Top 3 single. From May 29 to June 18, the group held a live tour entitled Zutto Suki Datta'n'jake: Sasurai no Men Kata Perfume Fes!! utilizing a 'Battle of the Bands' performance style with three other different artists: Kazuyoshi Saito, Tamio Okuda, and Maximum the Hormone. The tour consisted of six performances which were held at the Zepp music halls in Tokyo, Nagoya, and Osaka. Perfume also performed live at the Ultra Music Festival in South Korea on June 14. On May 22, Perfume released their second single for 2013, entitled "Magic of Love", releasing simultaneously the live DVD Perfume World Tour 1st, which covered their recent performance in Singapore from their world tour. On June 20, 2013, Perfume was invited to Cannes Lions International Festival of Creativity where they presented the "Perfume Global Site Project" which received a Silver Lion Award in Cyber Lions category, and performed a special version of their single "Spending All My Time". In July 2013, the group started their second world tour, in which they held concerts in Cologne, London and Paris. On June 19, Perfume announced the release of their fourth studio album, entitled Level3 for October 2, 2013, their first studio album with Universal Music Japan. On October 6, a new song titled "Party Maker" started to be promoted in TV commercials of Eisai's Chocola BB Sparkling. On August 14, 2013 Perfume performed in the NHK special program "Minna wo Tsunagu Mahou no Melody", Disney' songs, even as another artists. On November 27, 2013, their 19th single "Sweet Refrain" was released. The song was used as the theme song for TV Asahi drama Toshi Densetsu no Onna 2 which started broadcasting on October 11, 2013.

=== 2014: Perfume FES!! 2014, 5th Tour "Gurun Gurun" and "Perfume WORLD TOUR 3rd" ===
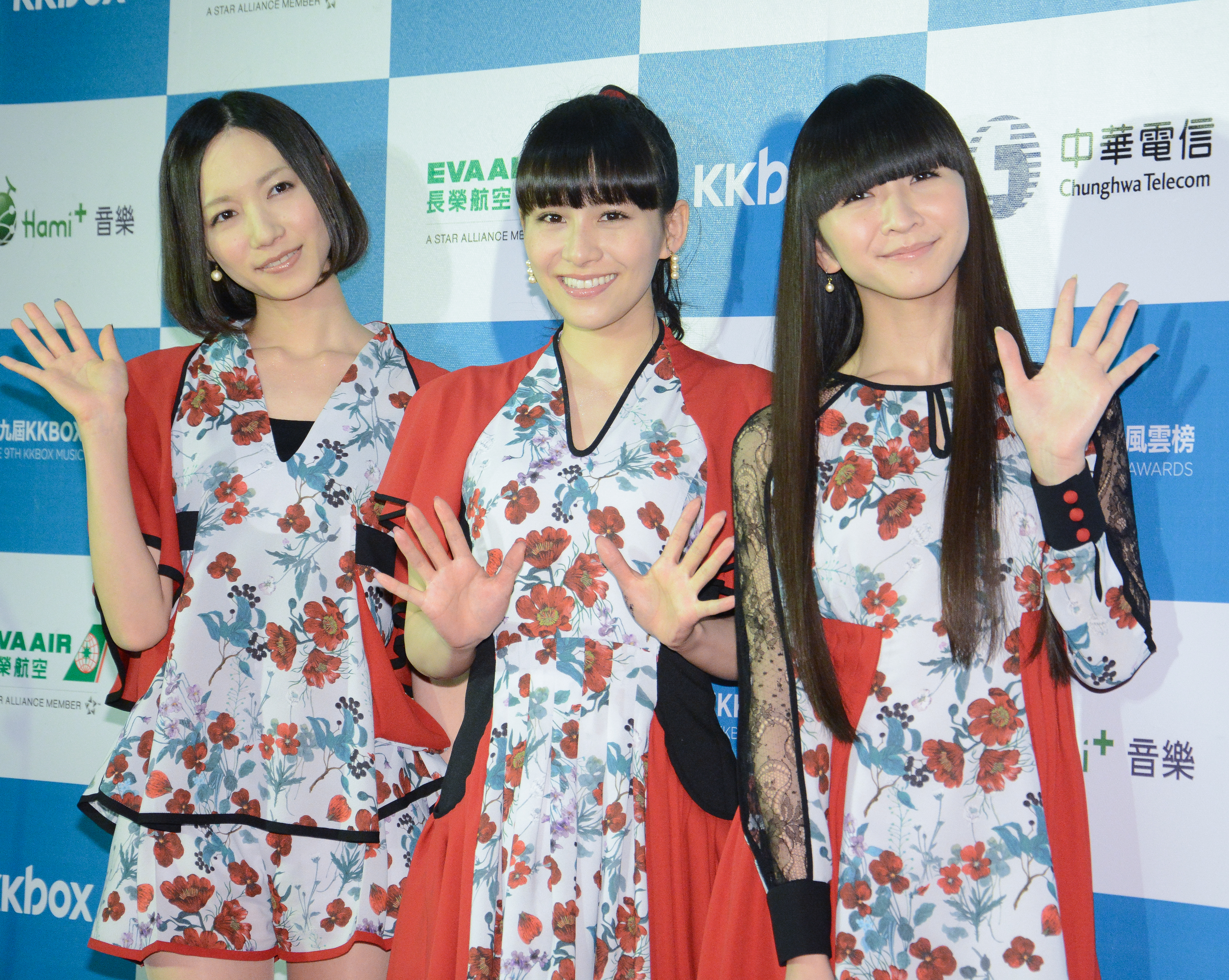
Perfume at the KKBOX Music Awards on 22 February 2014 in Taiwan

On February 22, 2014 Perfume was invited to perform at the 9th KKBOX Music Awards in Taiwan. They also announced their 2nd co-headlining tour entitled Perfume Fes!! 2014 (which ran from March 15 to 20) utilizing a 'Battle of the Bands' performance style again with eight other different artists, such as 9nine, Tokyo Ska Paradise Orchestra, and Rip Slyme. The tour consisted of nine performances at many music halls in Tokyo, Hiroshima, Shizuoka, Ishikawa, Kagawa and finally Seoul.

On April 30, the group announced via a fanclub-exclusive stream that they plan to release a new single in the summer of 2014, which would be their 20th major label single since their major label debut "Linear Motor Girl". At the same time they announced their 5th tour, titled "Perfume 5th Tour 'Gurun Gurun'". The tour is titled "Gurun Gurun" (which means round and round) to represent Perfume's long trip around Japan for this tour, with 14 dates in 7 cities.

On May 27, Perfume announced that they would release their new single "Cling Cling" on July 16, along with three other songs. It was also stated that "Cling Cling" will be used in a new Chocola BB commercial. On June 24, Perfume announced their next world tour titled "Perfume World Tour 3rd" from October 31 through November 15, taking them to Taiwan, Singapore, the United Kingdom, and their first visits to the United States. On July 16, Perfume released "Cling Cling", which was their 20th single overall, along with 3 other tracks, entitled "Hold Your Hand" (which would be the theme for the drama "Silent Poor"), "Display" (used with a tie-in with Panasonic 4K), and "Ijiwaru na Hello". The song "Hold Your Hand" had Perfume fans from all around the world contribute photographs of their hands with various lyrics and letters written on them. The pictures were then compiled into a final music video.

The group released a Bonus Edition of their album Level3 on October 7, with the label Astralwerks. This edition include two new mixes of their single Spending All My Time. Perfume's song "Hurly Burly" was the end theme of the short movie "FASTENING DAYS". The group made a cameo in the OK Go's I Won't Let You Down video.

=== 2015–2017: SXSW, 15th anniversary, "We Are Perfume", and Cosmic Explorer era ===
Perfume returned to the United States in March 2015 and appeared at SXSW on March 17. Their appearance included the debut of a new song, "STORY", and the performance received praise for the technology utilized and the futuristic visuals. On April 29, Perfume released a double A-side single Relax In The City/Pick Me Up. OK Go made a cameo in the music video for "Pick Me Up". In April 2015 Perfume released their iconic shoes 'Perfume Dance Heel', available on their webstore, Isetan and Asmart stores. Available in the colors: Pink beige, Black, White, Black gold and Coral Red suede. In 2015, Perfume Exhibit happened at Tower Records SHIBUYA 8F as one of "Perfume 10th ANNIVERSARY PROJECT"! Perfume costumes and rare photos were available there. On September 18 - October 4 started the VOL.1 Perfume-10 Tower Records zenpen 〜 mi ni kite kure n?〜 (Perfume展 タワレコ前編 〜見にきてくれん？〜, Perfume Exhibition Tower Records first part ~ Come see me? ~) and on October 9 - November 1 the VOL.2 Perfume-10 Tower Records kōhen ~ mi toita hō ga ē omou yo? (Perfume展 タワレコ後編〜見といた方がえぇおもうよ？〜, Perfume Exhibition Tower Records second part ~ You'd better watch it, you know ~). Between September 21–30, the group began a ten-day series of events to celebrate their 15th anniversary as a group. Events included "PTA summit" on 9/21, "Perfume FES!! 2015" on 9/22, "3rd Perfume Dance Contest" on 9/23, and a series of concerts titled "3:5:6:9" (pronounced "San:Go:Roku:Kyu") a pun on "sugoroku", which is Japanese for "board game". The concerts centered on a large die which determined the songs that the group would perform. On September 26, 2015, they released a collection of their columns Tachimachi,-go rinpikku sen? (たちまち、語リンピックせん?, Instantly, do not you word-ring?), 200 total, from TV Bros. magazine. Spanning 2007–2015, it was titled "Fan Service [TV Bros.]". On October 15, the next single "Star Train" was released. The song was used as the theme of Perfume's documentary "WE ARE Perfume -WORLD TOUR 3rd DOCUMENT", which chronicled their WORLD TOUR 3rd and their performance at SXSW. On November 26, they debuted the song "Next Stage With You", which was tied into the marketing campaign of the same name by Mercedes-Benz Japan. On December 5, Perfume was showcased in an episode of "Entertainment Nippon" by NHK World. In light of their upcoming documentary, the episode detailed the history of the group as well as the people behind the scenes that help the success of their live performances. On December 25, Perfume announced a fifth album to be released in the Spring of 2016, along with an accompanying nationwide arena tour. It was later revealed on February 14, 2016 entitled "Cosmic Explorer", to be released April 6, along with an accompanying 6th Tour by the same name. The single "Flash" was released together with the album "Cosmic Explorer", like an extra disc. "FLASH" was the theme song of live action adaptation of Chihayafuru.

On March 12, 2016, Perfume performed as part of NHK Ashita he Concert to support the victims of the big earthquake. On the first part of World Tour Perfume held a 'Cosmic Explorer Cafe' in Hong Kong, Taipei (Taiwan) and Seoul (Korea), with a Costume Display for the fans. Along with the World Tour, the 'Perfume: A Gallery Experience' exhibition was realized in London and New York. On July 20, the collaboration between OK Go and Perfume "I Don't Understand You" was released as the ending theme of TOKYO MX 20th Anniversary Memorial TV Animation 3DCG short 'Sushi Police' anime series. On July 27, 2016, Pentatonix released the album 'Pentatonix (Japan Super Edition)', with the song "Perfume Medley", a tribute to the group. On July 31, 2016, "Hold Your Hand" was the end theme of the short movie "FASTENING DAYS 2". On August 21, MIKIKO and Rhizomatiks from "Team Perfume" made the closing ceremony of the Rio Olympic Games. On August 30, 2016, Fuse Magazine added Perfume to list "FALL TOUR PREVIEW: 22 CONCERTS THAT ARE WORTH YOUR DOUGH", #7 place. On September 21, 2016, Perfume made live guest appearance in 3 radio programs in 3 different cities, promoting apart for the first time. NOCCHi at FM Fukuoka "Hiper Night Program GOW!!" in Fukuoka, a-chan at ZIP-FM "BEATNIC JUNCTION" in Nagoya and KASHIYUKA at FM802 "THE NAKAJIMA HIROTO 802 RADIO MASTERS" in Osaka. On October 2, 2016, debuted the new 3DCG animated series Chii's Grand Adventures with "Nee" as opening theme. On November 23, they collaborated with Uniqlo for the second time to promote Heattech's campaign website. On December 19, Rolling Stone magazine added Cosmic Explorer to the list "20 Best Pop Albums of 2016", #16 place.

On February 15, 2017, Perfume released the single "Tokyo Girl", the title track was used for the drama Tokyo Tarareba Girls, where A-chan debuted as a voice actress. They made a YouTube live stream performing the song in front of Tokyo Tower on Valentine's Day. On March 21, Perfume finally released their fragrance 'PERFUME OF PERFUME', available only on 2017 Spring on their webstore and Isetan stores. On March 31, and April 1, 2017 Perfume made their first drama appearance at TV Tokyo Special drama 'Pensées', available soon on Netflix. In April that year, Perfume stated that Kenta Maeda from the Los Angeles Dodgers was using "Flash" as his walk-up song this season. On June 2–3, Perfume FES!!2017 to take place, with guest artists Denki Groove and Chatmonchy on Makuhari Messe International Exhibition Hall 9 - 11 Hall. On June 4, Perfume appeared on Amuse Fes in MAKUHARI 2017 - rediscover -, in Makuhari Messe International Exhibition Hall 1 - 8 Hall. On August 21, Perfume collaboration with Isetan 'Perfume Dance Heel', released brand new color as "gloss black" and the new style with almond toes would come in "moss green" and "wine", both in suede. On September 6–14, will happen a new edition of Perfume FES!!2017 with guest artists Suga Shikao, Rekishi, Gen Hoshino and Maximum the Hormone on Aichi Prefectural Gymnasium and Osakajo Hall. In September 2017, "Sweet Refrain" was the end theme of the short movie "FASTENING DAYS 3", now released as a mini-series, and Perfume dubbed minor characters. On December 1, it was announced the launching of Perfume fashion line 'Perfume Closet', with unisex items inspired by clothes worn by them in their music videos "Tokyo Girl", "Flash", "Spring of Life" and "Laser Beam". On December 13–19, Maison Perfume became available at Isetan Stores. This project include products of collaborations of Perfume: "KOKUYO×SHOGO SEKINE" illustrated notes, "PILOT×SHOGO SEKINE" illustrated pens, "HASAMI by Akko" mugs, "KLOKA" key holders, "SUPERTHANKS" shirts, "petite robe noire" earrings, "Perfume Closet" clothes and "Perfume OFFICIAL GOODS".

=== 2018–2021: Future Pop and Perfume the Best: P Cubed ===
On March 14, 2018, Perfume released the single "Mugenmirai", serving as the theme song for the film Chihayafuru Part 3. On May 24, 2018, Perfume officially confirmed via their website and social media accounts that their sixth studio album Future Pop would be released on August 15, 2018, along with a Japanese arena tour in the fall. The album title, release date, artwork, and track list were officially revealed on June 27. On July 23, a new line-up of "Perfume Closet" was launched, it includes frill tops and skirts inspired by Perfume's stage outfits as well as products that incorporated Perfume's experience of creating beautiful but comfortable stage outfits and unisex pants and caps that are perfect for summer fun. In addition, a jewelry line with "perfume bottle" motifs was announced. On August 31, and September 5, and 30; a special screening of "Perfume 'Future Pop' Special -MV Selection-" was confirmed in Hong Kong, Korea, and Taiwan. Perfume talked in depth about the music videos from Future Pop along with video comments from the special guests. Between September 20, and October 10, to raise fund to donate for the victims of 2018 West Japan rain disaster, Perfume will put out past performance outfits to charity auction "Yahuoku!". All funds raised from the outfit charity auction will be donated through Central Community Chest of Japan. They also donated part of the profit from the sales of the album Future Pop as well as the merchandise sales of nationwide arena tour Perfume 7th Tour 2018 "Future Pop" starting September 21. This was donated through Amuse Bokin. They performed a song called “Tiny Baby” for the Japanese version of The Grinch.

On January 3, 2019, Perfume was announced as part of the lineup of the 2019 Coachella Festival in California, scheduled for April 14 and 21, 2019. They were the first J-pop group to perform at Coachella. On March 7, the Perfume's song "FAKE IT" was chosen as theme song of RCC television 60-year special program, "Koi Yori Suki ja, Damedesuka?", a love comedy drama based on people who support the existence of "Hiroshima Toyo Carp". On March 21, to celebrate Perfume's indie debut anniversary new "Perfume of Perfume" scented hand cream and fabric spray became available. The group's third compilation album, Perfume the Best: P Cubed, was released on September 18, and includes two new songs. The digital single "Nananananairo" was released on July 6, 2019 to promote it. In September, Perfume appeared as a guest of "Ageta: the talking fried chicken", a one-minute animation show on Hiroshima TV. In December, "Dream Fighter" was used as the end theme of the mini-series Fastening Days 4.

Parco Museum Tokyo hosted the "Rhizomatiks inspired by Perfume 2020" exhibition from January 11–27, 2020. In this exhibition, Perfume celebrated the 15th anniversary of their debut, and revealed details behind the stage productions and artwork created by Rhizomatiks, the systems used for live performances, media art installations, and VR content. To commemorate the 2020 dome tour, "Perfume Closet Part 4" pop-up shops were announced for 5 locations in 4 major cities starting at Shibuya's brand new mall, Shibuya Scramble Square, as well as Osaka, Fukuoka, Nagoya and Tokyo. Perfume appeared as the first artist of Disney's original music documentary program "Disney My Music Story", which began distribution January 31, 2020, on Disney's official video distribution service "Disney Deluxe". The program included interviews talking about the members' life stories, thoughts on music, memories of Disney, and performances of Perfume's songs, as well as Disney songs selected by members themselves in original arrangements. Due to the COVID-19 pandemic, the last show of the "Perfume 8th Tour 2020 'P Cubed' in Dome" tour at Tokyo Dome on February 26 was cancelled, following the recommendations of the Health Ministry of Japan. The project "Perfume 15th&20th anniv with you all Vol.1" scheduled to be released on 9/2 (Wednesday) the Blu-ray & DVD "Perfume 8th Tour 2020 "P Cubed" in Dome". In addition to it, the performance "Reframe 2019" was released as a movie "Reframe Theater Experience with you" in theaters from 9/4 (Fri.) for 2 weeks only. The project "Perfume 15th&20th anniv with you all Vol.2" scheduled to be released on 9/16 (Wednesday) the new single "Time Warp". The project "Perfume 15th&20th anniv with you all Vol.3" scheduled to be released on 9/22 (Tuesday/Holiday) Start Real Escape Game x Perfume "Escape from the room next to Perfume" at Tokyo Mystery Circus in Shinjuku. The project "Perfume 15th&20th anniv with you all Vol.4" scheduled to be released on 9/21 (Monday/Holiday) the "P.O.P" (Perfume Online Present) Festival. The project "Perfume 15th&20th anniv with you all Vol.5" which concludes the series of projects, will be released on October 23 (Friday), Perfume's first costume book "Perfume COSTUME BOOK 2005-2020" that looks back on the history of Perfume from its major debut in 2005 to the present.

On July 2, 2021, Perfume released their digital single, "Polygon Wave". A concert show was held for two days at the Yokohama Pia Arena MM on August 14 and August 15 to commemorate the single. The group announced that they will be releasing an EP with the same name on September 22. In addition, Perfume's appearance in the music festival 'Primavera Sound 2022,' which will take place in June 2022 in Spain, had been confirmed. The festival celebrates its 20 year anniversary in June 2021 but has been canceled due to COVID-19.

On October 15, Perfume announced that "Perfume LIVE 2022 [polygon wave]" will be held from January 9-January 16, 2022. This live will be a re-performance of <Perfume LIVE 2021 [polygon wave]> held at Pia Arena MM in Kanagawa in August 2021. It will be held at the same venue for 6 days. On November 12-December 18, it has been decided that the concept live "Reframe" will be held in 5 cities as a tour. This will be the first time that it will be held outside of Tokyo, and this time it will be held in a total of 13 performances in Tokyo, Ishikawa, Aichi, Hyogo, and Hiroshima.

=== 2022–2024: Plasma, 9th tour and Asia tour ===
On March 9, 2022, Perfume released their 27th single, "Flow". The title track, "Flow", was used for the drama "Fight Song" on TBS, and the B-side, "Mawarukagami (polygon wave live ver)", was performed in the <Perfume LIVE 2021 [polygon wave]>. On April 28, they cancelled appearance at the "Primavera Sound 2022" festival, which was set in June 2022, due to "light of the worldwide spread of coronavirus disease (COVID-19) as well as unstable world situations". On April 29, Perfume released their digital single, "Sayonara Plastic World". The song was first shown in the April / May broadcast of NHK show, "Minna no Uta". On May 12, Perfume announced that they would release their 7th studio album, Plasma, along with a Japanese arena tour in fall.

Between September 21, 2023 – November 18, 2023 Perfume held the P.T.A.15th&10th Anniversary "Perfume to Anata" -Hall Tour- 2023, exclusive to their P.T.A. fanclub members, about 5 years since their previous fanclub tour.

"Perfume COSTUME MUSEUM" exhibition was held at the Hyōgo Prefectural Museum of Art from September 9th (Sat) to November 26th (Sun), 2023. It has been decided that the large-scale costume exhibition will tour 4 venues nationwide! On 2024/6/15 (Sat) - 8/25 (Sun) Miyazaki Prefecture Miyazaki Art Center. On 2024/9/7 (Sat) - 10/27 (Sun) Hokkaido Higashi, 1-chome Theater Facility (formerly Hokkaido Shiki Theater). On 2025/2/22 (Sat) - 6/1 (Sun) Hiroshima Prefecture, Hiroshima City Museum of Contemporary Art. On 2025/6/28 (Sat) - 9/28 (Sun) Iwate Prefectural Museum of Art, Iwate Prefecture.

Collaboration products between "Perfume Closet" and F ORGANICS/O by F was released on April 4th (Thursday), 2024! This collaboration features a total of four skin care and hair care items. In skin care, collaboration with two products, "Effe Organic Deep Moisture Lotion" and "Effe Organic Deep Moisture Milk". In hair care, collaboration with two products: "Obai Effe Moist Shampoo" and "Obai Effe Repair Treatment". In this collaboration, a collaboration-limited fragrance supervised by Perfume members will be sold in collaboration-limited packaging. The scent is the "Sweet Refrain", a refreshing scent inspired by green tea, with a pleasant accord of fresh citrus and herbs.

"Perfume "COD3 OF P3RFUM3 ZOZ5" Asia Tour 2024" is set between June 8, 2024 (Sat) and July 13, 2024 (Sat) and will take place in four cities: Hong Kong, Taipei, Bangkok, and Shanghai. This will be the first time in Hong Kong since 2012's "Perfume WORLD TOUR 1st," in Shanghai and Taipei since 2019's "Perfume WORLD TOUR 4th FUTURE POP," and the first time in Bangkok (Thailand).

The experiential exhibition "Perfume Disco-Graphy 25 Years of History and Miracles" has been scheduled to be held at TOKYO NODE in Toranomon Hills from August 9, 2024 to October 14, 2024. Perfume's first retrospective of their history from their formation to the present will be held in three galleries at TOKYO NODE, covering a total area of over 1,500 square meters. Various "synchronizations" - the theme of the exhibition, such as "synchronization of lyrics and choreography", "synchronization of the three members' bodies," "synchronization of physical expression and performance", "synchronization with fans", and "synchronization with the times" - are reproduced in the gallery, which is approximately 60 meters long. This exhibition allows people of all kinds to feel the synchronization between humans and technology through a simulated experience of the performance.

=== 2024–present: Nebula Romance: Part I and Nebula Romance: Part II, 10th tour, and hiatus ===
The group released a special anniversary website on September 21st, 2024, ahead of the 25th anniversary of their formation and the 20th anniversary of their major label debut. On the same day, the new album Nebula Romance was announced in two parts. Nebula Romance: Part I was released on October 30th, and the digital version was released on September 20th. Nebula Romance: Part II was released on September 17, 2025, and includes ten songs.

To promote their new album Nebula Romance Part I, Perfume has announced an arena tour, "Perfume 10th Tour ZOZ5 "Nebula Romance" Episode 1", which will visit eleven cities across the country, from December 28th, 2024 to April 20th, 2025.

On September 21, 2025, Perfume announced that they would go on hiatus at the end of the year, stating, "If we're going to be together for the long term, we've decided to take a break and move on to new challenges as a better, cooler Perfume." The group stated that they all want to come back and promised to return. Perfume's last appearance before hiatus took place at the 76th edition of Kōhaku Uta Gassen, performing "Polyrhythm" and "Megu Loop". Despite the group's hiatus officially beginning at the end of 2025, Perfume released the single "Cold Sleep" in May 2026, followed by a documentary film released in theaters sharing the same name, documenting the events leading up to their hiatus. A new compilation album titled Favorites (Selected By Perfume / Cold Sleep) is set to release on December 23rd, 2026, featuring four sides, with the first three comprising songs selected by Nishiwaki, Kashino, and Ōmoto respectively, and the fourth side made up of the latest singles "Cold Sleep" and "Fumetsu no Anata".

== Musical style and image ==
The group's music, on several occasions, has been identified as "technopop". It was around 2005 that the group's original post-Shibuya-kei sound began making a transition to electronic dance-pop music, influenced by 1980s synthpop and incorporating vocoders.

Perfume has worked with producer and songwriter Yasutaka Nakata since 2003. "We don't really have any input when Nakata is writing and the ideas behind Future Pop, and all our music, are his," the group told Forbes. "Nakata's been writing songs for us that match the specific time of our lives so that the music has actually matured with us."

MTV Iggy said "There are a few reasons why Perfume is one of Japan's most thrilling pop acts. For one thing, there's the music, which is an infectious batch of chart-topping melodies built upon a foundation of intricate maximal house production that would give Daft Punk a run for their money, with heavily processed vocals that stutter robotically yet always sound 100 percent human. On top of that, they have an impeccably designed retro-futuristic image and punishing, innovative choreography that they nevertheless render effortless. Where all of this truly comes together, of course, is on stage."

The group has influenced acts like Aira Mitsuki, immi, Mizca, SAWA, Saori@destiny, Sweet Vacation, 80_pan, @onefive, and former labelmate Vanilla Beans.

== Members ==
Perfume members use their official nicknames on stage and TV rather than their real names.

=== Current ===
Stage name	Birth name	Date of birth
NOCCHi	Ayano Ōmoto (大本 彩乃, Ōmoto Ayano)	September 20, 1988 (age 38)
KASHIYUKA	Yuka Kashino (樫野 有香, Kashino Yuka)	December 23, 1988 (age 37)
a-chan	Ayaka Nishiwaki (西脇 綾香, Nishiwaki Ayaka)	February 15, 1989 (age 37)

=== Former ===
Yuka Kawashima left the group to pursue her studies. She later joined another group called Risky and then attempted a solo career as Yuka. She graduated from the Hiroshima University of Economics in 2011. She now lives in Hiroshima and works at YNN47.

Stage name	Birth name	Date of birth
Kawayuka	Yuka Kawashima (河島 佑香, Kawashima Yuka)	November 5, 1988 (age 38)

== Discography ==
- Game (2008)
- Triangle (2009)
- JPN (2011)
- Level3 (2013)
- Cosmic Explorer (2016)
- Future Pop (2018)
- Plasma (2022)
- Nebula Romance: Part I (2024)
- Nebula Romance: Part II (2025)

== Media appearances ==
=== Movies ===
- [2011.06.24] Cars 2 - as background music at the party in Tokyo ("Polyrhythm")
- [2011.09.23] Moteki
- [2013.03.09]. Doraemon: Nobita's Secret Gadget Museum - Title Track "Mirai No Museum" (Level3).
- [2015.10.31] WE ARE Perfume -WORLD TOUR 3rd DOCUMENT
- [2020.09.04] Reframe THEATER EXPERIENCE with you
- [2020.09.21] Perfume Imaginary Museum "Time Warp"

=== Television ===
- [2006.07 - 2007.03] PaPaPaPaPaPaPerfume
- [2008.01 - 2008.03] Speciaboys Japan
- [2008.04 - 2008.09] HAPPY!
- [2008.10 - 2009.03] Perfume no Ki ni Naru Ko-chan
- [2009.04 - 2009.06] Perfume no Chandelier House
- [2009.04 - 2016.04] MUSIC JAPAN
- [02.14.2010] American Dad, "May The Best Stan Win" (features "Monochrome Effect")
- [2023.04 - present] Nazotoki! Himitsu no Shihō-san

=== PV appearance ===
- [2005.05.18] Candy - "Promise" - Appear as a back dancer dancing hip-hop dancing.
- [2008.06.25] Porno Graffitti - "Itai Tachiichi" - PV only sings part of the song.
- [2014.10.27] OK Go - "I Won't Let You Down" - Cameo appeared in the opening part.

=== Radio ===
- [2004.05 - 2001.12] Perfume Planet
- [2004.08 - 2006.03] Perfume no Dokki Doki on Air
- [2006.04 - 2008.09] Perfume no Magical ☆ City
- [2007.10 - 2008.09] Perfume no Panpaka Party
- [2008.03 - 2021.03] Perfume LOCKS!
- [2020.05] Perfume Planet Returns
- [2022.08] Perfume no Dokki Doki on Air Returns

=== Photobooks ===
- 2008.12.17: Perfume Portfolio
- 2009.12.17: Perfume Livefolio
- 2011.02.04: Perfume LIVE@Tokyo Dome 1 2 3 4 5 6 7 8 9 10 (Only members of the fan club P.T.A)
- 2014.04.26: Perfume 4th Tour in DOME ｢Level3｣ (Only members of the fan club P.T.A)
- 2020.09.02: Perfume 8th Tour 2020 "P Cubed" in Dome (Only members of the fan club P.T.A)

=== Books ===
- 2015.10.01: Perfume Fan Service [TV Bros.]
- 2020.02.01: Perfume LIVE DATA BOOK
- 2020.10.23: Perfume COSTUME BOOK 2005-2020
- 2024.09.21: Perfume Fan Service [TV Bros.2]
- 2025.02.14: Perfume Fan Service [TV Bros.3]

== Live performances ==
Date(s)	Title of performance	Venue(s)
January 3, 2004	Bee-Hive New Year Live '04: Perfume Day	Shibuya-Boxx
April 11, 2004	Perfume Record Release！Sing Live Special!!	Shibuya O-Crest
December 16, 2004	Play a Trick on You!! Dreamy World	Shibuya O-Crest
July 7, 2005	Play a Trick on You!! Electrical Girls	Shibuya O-West
December 21, 2005	Perfume's Poppokepiiiii Night	Harajuku Astro Hall
December 21, 2006	Perfume Presents: Perfume ga Ippai Santa Yonjaimashita	Harajuku Astro Hall
July 5, 2007	Perfume Hikoboshi Boshū-chū	Daikanyama Unit
July 6, 2007	Perfume Hikoboshi Boshū-chū	Daikanyama Unit
October 31, 2007	Thankful! Grateful! Poly-invasion! We're Perfume	Nagoya Electric Lady Land, Osaka Muse, Shin-Hiroshima Telecasting Shinkan Ninth Story Studio
November 3, 2007	Thankful! Grateful! Poly-invasion! We're Perfume	Nagoya Electric Lady Land, Osaka Muse, Shin-Hiroshima Telecasting Shinkan Ninth Story Studio
November 8, 2007	Perfume: Seventh Heaven Feeling Pleasant	Liquidroom
December 31, 2007	Perfume Masaka no Countdown!? LIQUIDROOM: That Night Once Again, in Zepp Tokyo	Zepp Tokyo
February 12, 2008	Perfume: Socks, Fix, Max	Shibuya-AX
February 13, 2008	Eve of P.T.A. Launch: Patto Fun Playing Gathering	Liquidroom
April 27, 2008	Perfume First Tour "Game"	Zepp Osaka, Takamatsu Olive Hall, Hiroshima Club Quattro, Fukuoka Drum Logos, Zepp Tokyo, Zepp Nagoya, Niigata Lots, Sendai Forus, Sendai Club Junk Box, Sapporo Penny Lane, Yokohama Blitz
June 1, 2008	Perfume First Tour "Game"	Zepp Osaka, Takamatsu Olive Hall, Hiroshima Club Quattro, Fukuoka Drum Logos, Zepp Tokyo, Zepp Nagoya, Niigata Lots, Sendai Forus, Sendai Club Junk Box, Sapporo Penny Lane, Yokohama Blitz
June 21, 2008	Hot Stuff 30th Anniversary: Black and Blue	Zepp Tokyo
November 6, 2008	Perfume "Budoukaaaaaaaaaan!!!!!"	Nippon Budokan
November 7, 2008	Perfume "Budoukaaaaaaaaaan!!!!!"	Nippon Budokan
May 9, 2009	Disco! Disco! Disco!	Yoyogi National Gymnasium
May 10, 2009	Disco! Disco! Disco!	Yoyogi National Gymnasium
August 7, 2009	Perfume Second Tour 2009 "Chokkaku Nitohen Sankakkei Tour"	Toda City Culture Kaikan, Fukuoka Sun Palace Hotel and Hall, Hiroshima Kouseinenkin Kaikan, Himegin Hall, Ishikawa Kouseinenkin Kaikan, Niigata People's Kaikan, Sapporo City People's Hall, Sendai Sun Plaza Hall, Nagoya Nippon Gaishi Hall, Osaka City Hall, Yokohama Arena
October 30, 2009	Perfume Second Tour 2009 "Chokkaku Nitohen Sankakkei Tour"	Toda City Culture Kaikan, Fukuoka Sun Palace Hotel and Hall, Hiroshima Kouseinenkin Kaikan, Himegin Hall, Ishikawa Kouseinenkin Kaikan, Niigata People's Kaikan, Sapporo City People's Hall, Sendai Sun Plaza Hall, Nagoya Nippon Gaishi Hall, Osaka City Hall, Yokohama Arena
March 7, 2010	P.T.A. Spring 2010 Tour	Yokohama Blitz, Zepp Nagoya, Zepp Osaka, Zepp Tokyo, Zepp Sendai, Niigata Lots, Zepp Sapporo, Zepp Fukuoka, Hiroshima Cluc Quattro, Kochi Bay5 Square
April 3, 2010	P.T.A. Spring 2010 Tour	Yokohama Blitz, Zepp Nagoya, Zepp Osaka, Zepp Tokyo, Zepp Sendai, Niigata Lots, Zepp Sapporo, Zepp Fukuoka, Hiroshima Cluc Quattro, Kochi Bay5 Square
November 3, 2010	10th Anniversary Since Formation, 5th Major Debut Anniversary! Perfume Live @ Tokyo Dome "1 2 3 4 5 6 7 8 9 10 11"	Tokyo Dome
November 28, 2010	Mnet Asian Music Awards	The Venetian Macao
October 15, 2011	2011 Asia Song Festival	Daegu, South Korea
January 14 – May 26, 2012	Perfume 3rd Tour "JPN"	Kobe World Memorial Hall, Saitama Super Arena, Niigata Convention Center, Fukuoka Convention Center, Nippon Gaishi Hall, Shizuoka Ecopa Arena, Osaka Castle Hall, Hiroshima Green Arena, Ehime Prefecture Budokan, Sekisui Heim Super Arena, Makomanai Sekisui Heim Ice Arena, Nippon Budokan, Ginowan Seaside Park
October 26 – November 24, 2012	Perfume World Tour 1st (Asia)	Neo Studio (Taiwan), Rotunda 3 (Hong Kong), AX-Korea (South Korea), *Scape (Singapore)
May 29 – June 18, 2013	Zutto Suki Dattanjake ~ Sasurai no Menkata Perfume Fes!!	Zepp DiverCity Tokyo, Zepp Nagoya, Zepp Namba
June 20, 2013	Cannes Lions International Festival of Creativity (France)	Palais des Festivals et des Congrès (France)
July 3–7, 2013	Perfume World Tour 2nd (Europe)	Gloria (Germany), O2 Shepherd's Bush Empire (previously O2 Academy Islington, moved to better cope with demand) (UK), Bataclan (France)
December 7–25, 2013	Perfume 4th Tour in Dome "Level3"	Osaka Dome, Tokyo Dome
February 22, 2014	9th Kkbox music Awards	Taipei Arena (Taiwan)
March 15 – April 20, 2014; October 12, 2014	Perfume Fes!! 2014	NHK Hall, Ueno Gakuen Hall, Shizuoka City Culture Hall, Honda no Mori Hall, Alpha Anabuki Hall, Kagoshima Citizen's Cultural Hall, UNIQLO-AX (South Korea- cancelled because tragedy of the Sinking of the MV Sewol); AX-KOREA (Seoul, South Korea, ex-UNIQLO-AX)
August 1 – September 21, 2014	Perfume 5th Tour "Gurun Gurun"	Hiroshima Prefectural Sports Center, Marine Messe Fukuoka, Osaka Castle Hall, Makomanai Sekisui Heim Ice Arena, Miyagi Sekisui Heim Super Arena, Yoyogi National Gymnasium
October 31 – November 15, 2014	Perfume WORLD TOUR 3rd (Asia, North America, Europe)	Taipei International Convention Center (Taiwan), Resorts World Sentosa (Singapore), Hollywood Palladium (United States), Hammersmith Apollo (United Kingdom), Hammerstein Ballroom (United States)
March 17, 2015	SXSW 2015	Highland (Austin, Texas, United States)
September 22, 2015	Perfume Anniversary 10days 2015 PPPPPPPPPP 「Perfume FES!! 2015 〜sanin matsuri〜」	Nippon Budokan
September 26 – October 7, 2015	Perfume Anniversary 10days 2015 PPPPPPPPPP 「LIVE 3：5：6：9」	Nippon Budokan, Hiroshima Green Arena
May 5 – July 3, 2016; August 26 – September 4, 2016	Perfume 6th Tour 2016 "Cosmic Explorer" (Japan, United States)	Miyagi Sekisui Heim Super Arena, Shizuoka Ecopa Arena, Sun Dome Fukui, Asty Tokushima, Makuhari Messe International Exhibition Hall, Wakayama Big Whale, Hokkai Kitaeru, The Wiltern (Los Angeles, U.S.A.), The Warfield (San Francisco, U.S.A.), The Vic Theatre (Chicago, U.S.A.), HAMMERSTEIN BALLROOM (New York, U.S.A.)
October 22 – November 12, 2016	Perfume 6th Tour 2016「Cosmic Explorer」Dome Edition	Kyocera Dome Osaka, Nagoya Dome, Fukuoka Yahuoku! Dome
June 2, 2017	Perfume FES!! 2017 ～Zen'yasai～	Makuhari Messe International Exhibition Hall 9 - 11 Hall
June 3, 2017	Perfume FES!! 2017	Makuhari Messe International Exhibition Hall 9 - 11 Hall
June 4, 2017	Amuse Fes in MAKUHARI 2017 - rediscover -	Makuhari Messe International Exhibition Hall 1 - 8 Hall
September 6–14, 2017	Perfume FES!! 2017	Aichi Prefectural Gymnasium, Osakajo Hall
February 14 – May 24, 2018	Perfume Fanclub Tour	Makuhari Event Hall, Osaka Festival Hall, Fukuoka Civic Hall, Hiroshima HBG Hall, Doshin Hall, Tokyo Electron Hall Miyagi, Niigata Terrsa, Nagoya Congress Center, Shizuoka City Shimizu Culture Hall
March 20–21, 2018	This is NIPPON Premium Theatre「Perfume×TECHNOLOGY」presents "Reframe"	NHK Hall
June 2, 2018	Amuse Fes in MAKUHARI 2018 −AMEOTOKO HAREONNA−	Makuhari Messe International Exhibition Hall 9-11
August 4, 2018	SUPER SLIPPA 9	Taipei Arena
September 21 – December 31, 2018	Perfume 7th Tour 2018 "FUTURE POP"	Multipurpose sports arena Big Hat, Osaka-jō Hall, Mori-Transport "Aomori Prefectural Skating Rink", Ecopa Arena, Asty Tokushima, Sapporo Makomanai SekiSui Haimu Ice Arena, Japan Gaishi Hall, Yokohama Arena, Marine Messe Fukuoka
February 23 – April 19, 2019	Perfume WORLD TOUR 4th "FUTURE POP"	National Exhibition and Convention Center (Shanghai, China), Taiwan University Sports Center (Taipei, Taiwan), Hammerstein Ballroom (New York, U.S.A), Queen Elizabeth Theatre (Toronto, Canada), Chicago Theatre (Chicago, U.S.A), The Bomb Factory (Dallas, U.S.A), Paramount Theatre (Seattle, U.S.A), City National Civic (San Jose, U.S.A), Ace Theatre (Los Angeles, U.S.A)
April 14, 2019; April 21, 2019	Coachella Festival 2019	Empire Polo Club (Indio, California, U.S.A)
June 1, 2019	Amuse Fes in MAKUHARI 2019	Makuhari Messe International Exhibition Hall
August 4, 2019	Rock in Japan Festival 2019	Hitachi Seaside Park
August 18, 2019	Summer Sonic Festival 2019	Makuhari Messe/ Zozo Marine Stadium
August 31, 2019	SWEET LOVE SHOWER 2019	Yamanakako Communication Plaza Kirara
September 15, 2019	KOYABU SONIC 2019	Intex Osaka
October 16–27, 2019	Reframe 2019	LINE CUBE SHIBUYA
February 1–26, 2020	Perfume 8th Tour 2020 'P Cubed' in Dome	Kyocera Dome Osaka, Fukuoka Yahuoku! Dome, Nagoya Dome, Tokyo Dome
May 23, 2020	METROCK 2020	Shin-Kiba (abandonment of event, because of emergency declaration due to COVID-19 pandemic, later cancelled on July 15)
September 21, 2020	"P.O.P" (Perfume Online Present) Festival	online worldwide via bilibili, Live From, LINE LIVE-VIEWING, U-NEXT, Nico Nico Live Broadcasting, ABEMA
November 26, 2020	Spotify presents TOKYO SUPER HITS LIVE 2020	online worldwide via Streaming+
May 16, 2021	METROCK 2021	Sakai City (abandonment of event, because of emergency declaration due to COVID-19 pandemic, later cancelled on June 14)
August 14–15, 2021	Perfume LIVE 2021 [polygon wave]	Yokohama Pia Arena MM
September 19, 2021	SUPERSONIC 2021	Zozo Marine Stadium
September 25, 2021	TV Asahi Dream Festival 2021	Makuhari Messe International Exhibition Hall 1, 2, 3 Hall
November 12, 2021 – December 18, 2021	Reframe Tour 2021	Line Cube Shibuya, Kanazawa Theater Ishikawa, Aichi Prefectural Art Theater, Kobe International House, Hiroshima Bunka Gakuen HBG Hall
January 9–16, 2022	Perfume LIVE 2022 [polygon wave]	Yokohama Pia Arena MM
June 9, 2022	Primavera Sound 2022 (cancelled)	Barcelona, Spain
August 20 – November 6, 2022	Perfume 9th Tour (Plasma)	Ariake Arena, Nippon Gaishi Hall, Osaka-jo Hall, Hiroshima Green Arena, Marine Messe Fukuoka, Big Hat, Sekisui Heim Super Arena, Saitama Super Arena, Hokkaido Prefectural Sports Center Hokkai Kitayell
June 1–8, 2023	Primavera Sound 2023	Parc del Fòrum (Barcelona, Spain), Cívitas Metropolitano (Madrid, Spain - cancelled)
June 3, 2023	Perfume LIVE 2023 'CODE OF PERFUME'	O2 Shepherds Bush Empire (London, UK)
July 16, 2023	J-WAVE presents INSPIRE TOKYO 2023 ～Best Music & Market	Yoyogi National Gymnasium
August 18, 2023	SONICMANIA 2023	Makuhari Messe
August 20, 2023	SUMMER SONIC 2023	Maishima Sonic Park
August 25, 2023	SWEET LOVE SHOWER 2023	Yamanashi Prefecture Yamanakako Exchange Plaza Kirara
September 21, 2023 – November 18, 2023	P.T.A.15th&10th Anniversary "Perfume to Anata" -Hall Tour- 2023	Kanamoto Hall, Aichi Prefectural Arts Theater, Osaka International Conference Center Main Hall, Ueno Gakuen Hall, LINE CUBE SHIBUYA, Pacifico Yokohama National Convention Hall, Sendai Sun Plaza Hall, Fukuoka Sunpalace Hotel & Hall, Kobe International House Kokusai Hall, Okinawa City Hall
November 5, 2023	TV Asahi Dream Festival 2023 x Perfume FES!!	Makuhari Messe International Exhibition Hall 1, 2, 3, 4
December 30–31, 2023	Perfume Countdown Live 2023→2024 "COD3 OF P3RFUM3" ZOZ5	Pia Arena MM
February 13–14, 2024	Countdown to the 16th Anniversary of Perfume P.T.A. LIVE ~Liquid Room That Night Again 2024~	Ebisu LIQUIDROOM
March 9, 2024	DayDay. SUPER LIVE 2024	Yokohama Arena
June 6, 2024 – July 13, 2024	Perfume "COD3 OF P3RFUM3 ZOZ5" Asia Tour 2024	Hong Kong Asia World Expo, Hall 10 (Hong Kong), Shanghai EHNECC Hong Arena (Shanghai), Taipei Music Center (Taipei), Bangkok UOB LIVE (Bangkok)
June 22, 2024	TV Asahi 65th Anniversary Project EIGHT-JAM FES	Saitama Super Arena
October 20, 2024	UMIMOYASU 2024 MOVE -MAKE A MOVE-	Zepp Haneda
November 23–24, 2024	anti sleeps tour 2024	Hiroshima Green Arena
December 28, 2024 – April 20, 2025	"Perfume 10th Tour ZOZ5 "Nebula Romance" Episode 1"	Pia Arena MM, SAGA Arena, Asty Tokushima, Ariake Arena, Ecopa Arena, Osaka Castle Hall, Sand Dome Fukui, Miyagi Sekisui Heim Super Arena, Port Messe Nagoya 1st Exhibition Hall, Makomanai Sekisui Heim Ice Arena, LaLa arena TOKYO-BAY
June 6, 2025	"OSAKA MUSIC LOVER -LIVE TO THE WORLD- supported by Asahi Super Dry WITH MASSIVE BEATS OSAKA"	Osaka Castle Hall
September 22–23, 2025	"Perfume ZO/Z5 Anniversary "Nebula Romance" Episode TOKYO DOME"	Tokyo Dome

== Awards ==
List of awards and nominations received by Perfume
Ceremony	Year	Award	Nominee(s) / Work(s)	Result	Ref.
ACC CM Festival	2015	Interactive ACC Grandprix	SXSW performance footage	Won	
Amuse Fes in Makuhari	2019	Best Love Story Award	Perfume	Won	
Best Hits Kayosai	2009	Gold Artist Award	Perfume	Won	
Cannes Lions International Festival of Creativity	2013	Cyber Division Award	Perfume Global Site Project	Won	
CD Shop Awards	2009	Sub Grand Prix Award	Game	Won	
Japan Media Arts Festival	2012	Digital Interactive Art Award	Perfume Global Site Project	Won	
Japan Media Arts Festival	2019	Entertainment Section - Excellent Award	Perfume	Won	
Japan Record Awards	2008	Excellence Award	Game	Won	
Mnet Asian Music Awards	2010	Best Asian Pop Award	Perfume	Won	
MTV Europe Music Awards	2014	Best Japanese Act	Perfume	Nominated	
MTV Europe Music Awards	2016	Best Japanese Act	Perfume	Nominated	
MTV Video Music Awards Japan	2009	MVA Best Choreography Video	"Dream Fighter"	Won	
MTV Video Music Awards Japan	2012	Best Dance Video	"Laser Beam"	Won	
MTV Video Music Awards Japan	2014	Best Dance Video	"Magic of Love"	Won	
MTV Video Music Awards Japan	2015	Best Group Video	"Pick Me Up"	Nominated	
MTV Video Music Awards Japan	2015	Best Dance Artist	Perfume	Won	
Space Shower Music Awards	2016	Best Live Production	Team Perfume	Won	
Space Shower Music Awards	2017	Best Group Artist	Perfume	Won	
Space Shower Music Awards	2019	Best Pop Artist	Perfume	Nominated	
Space Shower Music Awards	2020	Best Pop Artist	Perfume	Nominated	
Space Shower Music Awards	2020	Best Active Overseas	Perfume	Won	
53rd Best Dresser Awards	2024	Entertainment Category	Perfume	Won	

== Fandom ==
Some musicians have said that they are fans of Perfume. Marty Friedman named Perfume "the group that has the largest influence on the Japanese music industry in 2008", and covered their 5th major single Polyrhythm in the album Tokyo Jukebox. Musicians such as Kreva, Pierre Nakano from the band Ling Tosite Sigure, and Aya Hirano are all fans of the group. Utamaru from a Japanese hiphop group Rhymester and Okite Porsche from a new wave band RomanPorsche., who are both enthusiastic idol fans, declared that they were Perfume fans in the early stage of activities of the group and made a "25000 letter dialogue" over Perfume phenomenon on Yomiuri Shimbun Pop Style blog. Kimura Kaela played Perfume songs in heavy rotation in her radio program "Oh My Radio!" (J-Wave 81.3), which led them to appear in NHK and AC Recycling Ads. After their cameo in OK Go's video for "I Won't Let You Down", lead singer Damian Kulash revealed he was a fan via Instagram.

On Nico Nico Douga, the most visited Japanese video sharing site (similar to YouTube), MADs featuring Perfume songs and The Idolm@ster videos, were created, which led the album to number 1 status on Amazon.co.jp's music bestsellers. Some Internet media consider this as one of the factors for Perfume's net-based popularity at first. On the July 2007 ranking of Niconico Ichiba, or Niconico market, where users can introduce and buy goods related to videos, Perfume: Complete Best was ranked as number 1 and "Fan Service: Sweet" as number 7.

== Notes ==
Awards and achievements
Preceded by None	Japan in the ABU TV Song Festival; 2012 with "Spring of Life"	Succeeded by May'n with "ViViD"
