= Linear Motor Girl =

Single by Perfume
- Released: September 21, 2005
- Recorded: 2004–2005
- Genre: J-pop, electropop
- Label: Tokuma Japan Communications
- Songwriters: Emi Kinoko, Yasutaka Nakata
- Producer: Yasutaka Nakata

Perfume singles chronology
"Vitamin Drop" (2004)	"Linear Motor Girl" (2005)	"Computer City" (2006)

Music video
- "Linear Motor Girl" on YouTube

"Linear Motor Girl" is the first major label single (sixth overall) of Japanese electropop girl group Perfume. It was released on September 21, 2005 in Japan, and was the group's first release under Tokuma. The single is recognized and considered the group's debut single by Japanese media.

== Background ==
"Linear Motor Girl" is the 6th single released by Perfume. The single sold for four weeks in the charts and sold 2,600 copies. After that, their releases started to move up on the charts.

== Track listing ==
All tracks are written by Yasutaka Nakata; Lyrics by Emi Kinoko.

CD
No.	Title	Length
1.	"リニアモーターガール (Linear Motor Girl)"	4:06
2.	"ファンデーション (Foundation)"	3:55
3.	"コンピューター ドライビング (Computer Driving)"	4:24
