= Computer City (song) =

Single by Perfume

from the album Perfume: Complete Best
- B-side: "Perfume"
- Released: January 11, 2006
- Recorded: 2005 (Shibuya, Tokyo)
- Genre: Technopop, Bitpop
- Length: 4:44
- Label: Tokuma Japan Communications
- Songwriter: Yasutaka Nakata
- Producer: Yasutaka Nakata

Perfume singles chronology
"Linear Motor Girl" (2005)	"Computer City" (2006)	"Electro World" (2006)

Music video
- "Computer City" on YouTube

"Computer City" (コンピューターシティ, Konpyūtā Shiti) is a song recorded by Japanese girl group Perfume for their first greatest hits compilation, Perfume: Complete Best (2006). It was written, composed, arranged, and produced by Japanese musician and Capsule member Yasutaka Nakata. The single also included the B-side track "Perfume", which appeared on the parent album. It premiered on January 11, 2006 as the second single from the album in Japan. It was also released on June 19, 2013 through European and Oceanic regions, and June 25 in North America. Musically, "Computer City" is a technopop song, influenced by electronic music.

Upon its release, the track garnered generally favourable reviews from music critics. Some critics highlighted the song as one of Perfume's best singles, and commended the composition. It achieved minor success in Japan, peaking at number 45 on the Oricon Singles Chart and 35 on TBS' Count Down TV chart. An accompanying music video was shot by Kazuaki Seki; it features the girls performing the song in a black room. With additional promotion through Japanese commercials, the song has been performed on several concert tours by Perfume, including their 2007 Seventh Heaven tour and 2008 Game Tour.

== Background and composition ==
"Computer City" was written, composed, arranged, and produced by Japanese musician and Capsule member Yasutaka Nakata. Alongside this, it was recorded, mixed, and mastered by Nakata. The song was recorded in 2005 at Contemode Studios, Shibuya, Tokyo by Nakata. Alongside the album's remaining material, "Computer City" has partial rights by Nakata through Yahama Music Communications. The single also included the B-side track "Perfume", which also appeared on the parent album. It premiered on January 11, 2006 as the second single from the group's first greatest hits compilation, Perfume: Complete Best (2006). The single was also released on June 19, 2013 through European and Oceanic regions, and June 25 in North America. (Note: On June 19 and June 23, 2013, Perfume's musical releases (prior to the group's third studio album JPN) were released globally with Universal Music Japan.)

The CD single contains both "Computer City" and "Perfume". The artwork features Perfume, posing for the song's music video; Perfume member A-Chan is sitting down, Nocchi is leaning behind A-Chan, and Kashiyuka is standing behind them both. The maxi CD features an extra lyric booklet, printed on plain white paper. Musically, "Computer City" is a technopop song, influenced by electronic music. A staff editor from Amazon Japan noted that the song contained elements of technopop and 8-bit music. Ian Martin from AllMusic stated that the song, alongside their back catalogue from Tokuma Japan Communications, "adopt[ed] a vocoder-heavy production style strongly influenced by European electro and house". Similarly, a staff editor at CD Journal labelled the song's composition as "addictive technopop".

== Critical response ==
"Computer City" received generally favourable reviews from most music critics. A writer from CD Journal complimented the "tight" composition, and praised the production and songwriting by Yasutaka Nakata. Another reviewer from the same publication reviewed the single release, and highlighted the song's "pop catchy" melody and its lyrical content. A staff editor from Amazon was positive in their review, praising the composition of the track, and highlighted it as one of the best songs on the album. Channel-Ai staff editors awarded the song five stars out of five, stating "'Computer City' is a great improvement; it starts off with vocals only before it dives into a heavy beat. Although some parts turn a little monotone, most of the song remains catchy and melodic."

== Commercial performance ==
In Japan, "Computer City" debuted at number 45 on the Oricon Singles Chart; it sold 1,853 units within its first week of sales. It became the group's highest charting single and first top 50 charting performance at the time. It lasted five weeks in the top 200 chart, and sold over 4,000 units by the end of 2006. It was the group's highest charting and selling single until their 2007 effort, "Polyrhythm". The song debuted at number 35 on the TBS Count Down TV chart, and lasted two weeks there.

== Music video and live performances ==
Perfume dancing in a black background in the video "Computer City".

An accompanying music video was shot by Kazuaki Seki; it features the girls performing the song in a black room. There are several intercut scenes of computer generated imagery (CGI), which include the overlapping of digital circuits and other patterns. The music video also appeared on Perfume's DVD compilation sets for Perfume: Complete Best, and Perfume Clips (2014). "Computer City" was used for a Japanese commercial promoting the television show Tokyo Brigade.

The single has been performed on several tours conducted by Perfume. It first appeared on two of the group's promotional concerts; the Seventh Heaven tour in 2007, and the Socks Fix Make tour in 2008. The song was included on their Game Tour, group's first nationwide concert tour, and eventually included on the live DVD, released on October 15, 2008. Since then, "Computer City" has been performed on their 2009 Budoukan Tour in Japan, 2009 Second Concert tour, and their 2010 Tokyo Dome tour. In 2010, four years after its original release, the group was invited to perform "Computer City" on the Japanese music television show, Music Station. This marked the only single previous to the release and subsequent breakthrough of their single "Polyrhythm" that has been performed on Japanese television.

== Track listings ==
- Japanese CD single
1. "Computer City" (コンピューターシティ)
2. "Perfume"
- Digital download
1. "Computer City" (コンピューターシティ)
2. "Perfume"

== Credits and personnel ==
Details adapted from the liner notes of the Perfume: Complete Best album.

- Ayano Ōmoto – vocals
- Yuka Kashino – vocals
- Ayaka Nishiwaki – vocals
- Yasutaka Nakata – producer, composer, arranger, mixing, mastering.
- Seki Kazuaki – video director

== Charts and sales ==
=== Charts ===
Chart (2006)	Peak position
Japan Daily Chart (Oricon)	36
Japan Weekly Chart (Oricon)	45
Japan Count Down TV Singles Chart (TBS)	35

=== Sales ===
Region	Certification	Certified units/sales
Japan (RIAJ)	None	4,000

== Release history ==
Region	Date	Format	Label
Japan	January 11, 2006	CD single; digital download	Tokuma Japan Communications
Australia	June 19, 2013	Digital download	Universal Music Japan
New Zealand	June 19, 2013	Digital download	Universal Music Japan
United Kingdom	June 19, 2013	Digital download	Universal Music Japan
Germany	June 19, 2013	Digital download	Universal Music Japan
Ireland	June 19, 2013	Digital download	Universal Music Japan
France	June 19, 2013	Digital download	Universal Music Japan
Spain	June 19, 2013	Digital download	Universal Music Japan
Taiwan	June 19, 2013	Digital download	Universal Music Japan
United States	June 25, 2013	Digital download	Universal Music Japan
Canada	June 25, 2013	Digital download	Universal Music Japan
