= Polyrhythm (song) =

Single by Perfume

from the album Game
- B-side: "Seventh Heaven"
- Released: September 12, 2007
- Recorded: 2007
- Genre: J-pop; dance-pop; electropop
- Length: 4:09
- Label: Tokuma Japan Communications
- Songwriter: Yasutaka Nakata
- Producer: Yasutaka Nakata (中田ヤスタカ)

Perfume singles chronology
"Fan Service (Sweet)" (2007)	"Polyrhythm" (2007)	"Baby Cruising Love / Macaroni" (2008)

Music video
- "Polyrhythm" on YouTube

"Polyrhythm" (ポリリズム, Poririzumu) is a song by Perfume, released as the second single from their second album, Game, and 10th overall, as well as the first track on their third compilation album Love the World. Appropriately, the song's bridge is polyrhythmic, incorporating 5/8, 6/8 in the vocals, common time (4/4) and 3/2 in the drums. Tokuma Japan Communications originally requested for the bridge of the song to be removed for its atypical nature; a concession was reached by including a radio edit known as the "Extra Short Edit" on the single, which removes the bridge while the vocoded backing vocal on the near-end of the song (at 3:02) is half-distorted. The song was used for the Kankyō Recycle Campaign by NHK. The single has two editions: a CD only version and CD+DVD version. The only difference between the CD and CD+DVD version is that the CD+DVD version features the music video.

"Polyrhythm" appears in Konami's Dance Dance Revolution and Pop'n Music arcade music games (covered by Pink Lemonade), as well as Namco's Taiko no Tatsujin. Former Megadeth guitarist Marty Friedman also released his own version of the song on his album Tokyo Jukebox. The song appeared in the film and soundtrack for the Pixar film Cars 2. The director, John Lasseter, said "The moment I listened to Polyrhythm, I loved it, it was like falling in love."

== Track listing ==
=== CD ===
1. "Polyrhythm" (ポリリズム, Poririzumu)
2. "Seventh Heaven"
3. "Polyrhythm: Extra Short Edit"
4. "Polyrhythm: Original Instrumental"
5. "Seventh Heaven: Original Instrumental"

=== DVD ===
1. "Polyrhythm"

== Charts ==
Chart performance for "Polyrhythm"
Chart (2007–2008)	Peak position
Japan Hot 100 (Billboard)	39
Japan (Oricon)	7

=== Certification ===
Region	Certification	Certified units/sales
Japan (RIAJ)	Gold	100,000^{^}
Japan (RIAJ) Ringtone	Gold	100,000^{*}
^{*} Sales figures based on certification alone.^{^} Shipments figures based on certification alone.
