= Love the World =

Single by Perfume

from the album Triangle
- B-side: "Edge"
- Released: July 9, 2008
- Recorded: 2008
- Genre: J-pop; electropop; retro-pop; chiptune
- Length: 4:35
- Label: Tokuma Japan Communications
- Songwriter(s): Yasutaka Nakata
- Producer(s): Yasutaka Nakata (中田ヤスタカ)

Perfume singles chronology
"Baby Cruising Love/Macaroni" (2008)	"Love the World" (2008)	"Dream Fighter" (2008)

Music video
- "Love the World" on YouTube

"Love the World" (stylized as "love the world") is Perfume's 7th major single. It was released on July 9, 2008 and debuted at number one on the Oricon chart, becoming the first electropop song from an electropop act to do so, Yellow Magic Orchestra's song "Kimi ni, Mune Kyun" being the previous record holder at #2, twenty-five years prior. Love the World is Perfume's best-selling single in the span of their career.

The single's B-side, "edge", was used as background music for a KOSE Fasio commercial starring Aya Ueto.

== Track listing ==
All tracks are written by Yasutaka Nakata.

CD
No.	Title	Length
1.	"love the world"	4:35
2.	"edge"	6:31
3.	"love the world -Original Instrumental-"	4:36
4.	"edge -extended mix-"	8:41
Total length:		24:23

DVD
No.	Title	Length
1.	"love the world -Video Clip-"	4:35

== Charts ==
Year	Chart	Peak position	Sales
2008	Oricon Daily Singles Chart	1	95,980
2008	Oricon Weekly Singles Chart	1	95,980
2008	Oricon Yearly Singles Chart	47	136,575

== Certifications ==
Region	Certification	Certified units/sales
Japan (RIAJ)	Gold	100,000^{^}
Japan (RIAJ) Ringtone	Gold	100,000^{*}
^{*} Sales figures based on certification alone.^{^} Shipments figures based on certification alone.
