= Electro World (song) =

"Electro World エレクトロ・ワールド"

Single by Perfume

from the album Perfume: Complete Best
- B-side: "wonder2"
- Released: June 28, 2006
- Genre: J-pop; electropop; dance-rock
- Label: Tokuma Japan Communications
- Songwriter: Yasutaka Nakata
- Producer: Yasutaka Nakata

Perfume singles chronology
"Computer City" (2006)	"Electro World エレクトロ・ワールド" (2006)	"Fan Service (Sweet)" (2007)

Music video
- "Electro World" on YouTube

"Electro World" (エレクトロ・ワールド, Erekutoro Wārudo) is Perfume's 3rd major-label single. The single is produced by capsule member Yasutaka Nakata. It was released in a CD-only version and its catalog number is TKCA-73017. An official remix by Soichi Terada, titled "Electro World(relaxation mix)", is also available.

Electro World
A sample of the song.

== Track listing ==
1. "Electro World" (エレクトロ・ワールド)
2. "wonder2"

== Cover ==
Electro World was covered by Japanese noise band Hijokaidan's sub-project Hatsune Kaidan with vocals from vocaloid character Megpoid as the second track on the album Noisy Killer.
