= Magic of Love (song) =

2013 song by Perfume

Single by Perfume

from the album Level3
- B-side: "Handy Man"
- Released: May 22, 2013
- Recorded: 2013
- Genre: Dance-pop, synthpop
- Label: Universal J
- Songwriter: Yasutaka Nakata
- Producer: Yasutaka Nakata

Perfume singles chronology
"Mirai no Museum" (2013)	"Magic of Love" (2013)	"Sweet Refrain" (2013)

Music video
- "Magic of Love" on YouTube

"Magic of Love" is a song by Japanese girl group Perfume from their fourth studio album Level3 (2013). The song was released as the album's fourth and final single on 22 May 2013. It was written, composed and produced by Yasutaka Nakata. The song is a calm and mellow dance-pop and synthpop track, which features instrumentation of synthesizers and keyboards.

"Magic of Love" received positive reviews from music critics, whom complimented the song's production and composition. Despite peaking at number two on the Oricon Singles Chart, it became the group's third single to top the Billboard Japan Hot 100. An album version of the track was re-composed and re-arranged by Nakata for the parent album. Yusuke Tanaka commissioned the accompanying music video for the single, which shows Perfume dancing in a room and features multiple figures of the members in different rooms.

== Background and composition ==
Japanese girl group Perfume have released three studio albums. All three albums, Game (2008), Triangle (2009) and JPN peaked at number one in Japan. The albums were certified platinum by the Recording Industry Association of Japan (RIAJ) with shipments of 250,000 units; the first was awarded double platinum. While working on their third album, Perfume departed from Tokuma Japan Communications and signed a deal with Universal Music Japan in order to release their work through global markets. They began work on their fourth studio album not long after.

As with the rest of Level3, Japanese producer and Capsule musician Yasutaka Nakata had written, arranged and composed the song. Nakata has collaborated with all of Perfume's records and songs from 2003 onwards. It was recorded in Tokyo, Japan and was mixed and mastered by Nakata. It is a "calm" dance-pop and synthpop song, and incorporates instrumentation of a synthesizer and keyboards. Writing for Land of Rising, Alex Shenmue commented that its "mellow mood will be there for most of the track’s length, replacing the more instrumentally complex parts and offering a calmer and slightly melancholic feeling, [...]".

== Reception ==
"Magic of Love" received favorable reviews from most music critics. Shenmue highlighted the track as an album standout. Patrick St. Michael, writing for The Japan Times, said the composition wasn't an "improvement" but commented that it was "simple, catchy pop"; he felt the track was better than the two other album mix tracks. Selective Hearing's writer Nia felt "50/50" with the song, saying "It’s not a horrible mix but… were the bagpipes really that necessary?". A writer from CDJournal labelled the track "cute" but also "painful." Ian Martin, who had written their extended biography at Allmusic, had highlighted the song as an album and career standout. Konno Asami from nihongogo.com praised the outcome after the release of Perfume's "childish" single "Mirai no Museum", stating "it’s a fun song with a great dance and funny lyrics."

The song charted in Japan, South Korea and Taiwan. Reaching number three, it broke the group's eight consecutive singles to stall at number two; all their previous singles "Spring of Life", "Spending All My Time" and "Mirai no Museum" peaked at two. The song also peaked at number three on Japan's Hot 100 chart. The song reached number seventeen and seven in South Korea and Taiwan Overseas chart. (Note: Week references for G-Music: JPN 2012 week 15, "Spending All My Time" 2012 week 35, Love the World 2012 week 41, "Mirai no Museum" 2013 week 10, "Magic of Love" and Perfume World Tour 1st 2013 week 21, Level3 2013 week 40, "Sweet Refrain" 2013 week 48, "Cling Cling" 2014 week 30, Perfume 3rd Tour JPN and Perfume 4th Tour in Dome: Level3 2014 week 44.) The song was certified gold by RIAJ for shipments of 100,000 units in Japan.

== Release and promotion ==
Selected as the fourth and final single of Level3, the song was released as a stand-alone digital download on 22 May of that year. Two CD singles were issued; a standalone CD with all four songs, and a CD and DVD edition with a card slipcase. "Magic of Love" was used as in TV commercials of Pure Gummy by Kanro (the second song used for advertising this product after "Communication"). The spot started broadcasting on April 1, 2013, on Japanese television. The song was also used as theme song of TV Tokyo's program Sukkiri in May 2013.

The official music video was directed by Japanese director Yusuke Tanaka and premiered on Perfume's YouTube channel in June 2013. It shows Perfume sitting in miniature room, singing the track. Several shots of the group have them holding frames, opening doors and looking through windows, changing each scene once it happens. During the choruses, it has the girls dancing together in a room with confetti and features duplicate figures of the girls every. It ends with the "Magic of Love" title.

== Credits and personnel ==
Details adapted from the liner notes of the "Magic of Love" CD single.

=== Song credits ===
- Ayano Ōmoto (Nocchi) - vocals
- Yuka Kashino (Kashiyuka) - vocals
- Ayaka Nishiwaki (A-Chan) - vocals
- Yasutaka Nakata - producer, composer, arranger, mixing, mastering.

=== Visual credits ===
- Yusuke Tanaka - director
- Takahiko Kajima - video producer
- Kazunali Tajima - camera
- Mikiko - choreographer

== Track listing ==
All tracks are written by Yasutaka Nakata.

CD
No.	Title	Length
1.	"Magic of Love"	3:41
2.	"Handy Man"	4:07
3.	"Magic of Love" (Original Instrumental)	3:41
4.	"Handy Man" (Original Instrumental)	4:07

== Charts ==
Chart (2000)	Peak position
Japan (Oricon)	2
Japan (Billboard)	2
Japan Hot Airplay (Billboard)	4
Japan Hot Airplay (Billboard)	7
Japan Hot Single Sales (Billboard)	3
South Korea (Gaon Chart)	23
Taiwan (G-Music)	13

== Certifications ==
Region	Certification	Certified units/sales
Japan (RIAJ)	Gold	100,000^{^}
^{^} Shipments figures based on certification alone.

== Release history ==
Country	Date	Format	Label	Ref.
Japan	27 February 2013	CD single	Universal Music Japan, Perfume Records	
Japan	27 February 2013	Digipak	Universal Music Japan, Perfume Records	
Taiwan	27 February 2013	Digipak	Universal Music Japan, Perfume Records	
Japan	27 February 2013	Digital download	Universal Music Japan, Perfume Records	
United States	27 February 2013	Digital download	Universal Music Japan, Perfume Records	
Australia	27 February 2013	Digital download	Universal Music Japan, Perfume Records	
New Zealand	27 February 2013	Digital download	Universal Music Japan, Perfume Records	
Canada	27 February 2013	Digital download	Universal Music Japan, Perfume Records	
United Kingdom	27 February 2013	Digital download	Universal Music Japan, Perfume Records	
