= Spring of Life (song) =

Single by Perfume

from the album Level3
- B-side: "Communication"
- Released: April 11, 2012
- Recorded: 2012
- Genre: Dance, pop
- Length: 3:49
- Label: Universal J
- Songwriter: Yasutaka Nakata
- Producer: Yasutaka Nakata

Perfume singles chronology
"Spice" (2011)	"Spring of Life" (2012)	"Spending All My Time" (2012)

Music video
- "Spring of Life" on YouTube

"Spring of Life" is a song by Japanese girl group Perfume from their fourth studio album Level3 (2013). The song was released as the album's lead single on 11 April 2012. It was written, composed and produced by Yasutaka Nakata. The song is a dance track, which features instrumentation from synthesizers and keyboards. "Spring of Life" is the group's first offering after departing from Tokuma Japan Communications and signing with Universal Music Japan.

"Spring of Life" received positive reviews from music critics, whom complimented the song's production and composition. Despite peaking at number two on the Oricon Singles Chart, it became the group's third single to top the Billboard Japan Hot 100. An album version of the track was re-composed and re-arranged by Nakata for the parent album. Yusuke Tanaka directed the accompanying music video for the single, which shows Perfume as robots and dancing with fairy lights around them. Perfume have performed the song in a number of live performances throughout Japan.

== Background and composition ==
Japanese producer and Capsule musician Yasutaka Nakata had written, arranged and composed the song. Nakata has collaborated with all of Perfume's records and songs from 2003 onwards. It was recorded in Tokyo, Japan and was mixed and mastered by Nakata. It is a dance song that fuses musical elements of techno, electronic music and pop music, and incorporates instrumentation from a drum machine, synthesizer and keyboards. This was Nataka's first single to be produced within the label since Meg's single "Passport/Paris" in 2010.

== Reception ==
"Spring of Life" received favorable reviews from most music critics. Writing for Land of Rising, Alex Shenmue favored the “well-done” mix of the album version and felt it was a “clear improvement that you’ll hardly come back to the single version after hearing this new mix.” Patrick St. Michael, writing for The Japan Times, said the composition wasn't an “improvement” but commented that it was "simple, catchy pop." Selective Hearing's writer Nia selected "Spring of Life" as an album stand out, favoring the bridge section of the song. Ian Martin, who had written their extended biography at Allmusic, had highlighted the song as an album and career standout.

The song only charted in Japan. Reaching number two on the Oricon Singles Chart, it became the group's sixth consecutive single to stall at number two. The following singles "Spending All My Time" and "Mirai no Museum" peaked at two, while the fourth single "Magic of Love" reached number three. The track peaked at number one on the Japan Hot 100, making it the group's third single to reach the top spot and their first since their 2009 single "One Room Disco". In April 2012, "Spring of Life" was certified gold by the Recording Industry Association of Japan (RIAJ) in for shipments of 100,000 units in Japan.

== Release and promotion ==
Selected as the lead single of Level3, the song was distributed digitally at Chaku-Uta on February 29, 2012. Two CD singles were issued; a standalone CD which included the b-side "Communication" and a bonus DVD version. The title track had already been chosen as the CM song for ‘Kirin Chu-hai Hyouketsu‘. The b-side "Communication" was chosen as the CM song for ‘Kanro Pure Gummy‘ candy.

The official music video was directed by Japanese director Yusuke Tanaka. The video features Perfume as robots, controlled by an automated-computer to perform human-like interactions such as eating, dancing, smiling and crying. Some verses and the choruses feature the group dancing to the song. It ends with member Nocchi pulling the power-plug from member A-chan's back, shutting down the computer and Perfume. The members stated that they found it interesting to try and imitate the image of themselves as robots and dolls and found the choreography to be the most powerful that they've done so far.

Perfume had included the album version of the track to their Perfume 4th Tour in DOME: LEVEL3 tour, which features the members in blue dresses. It was featured on the DVD version of the concert and uploaded on their YouTube channel.

== Track listing ==
All tracks are written by Yasutaka Nakata.

CD
No.	Title	Length
1.	"Spring of Life"	3:49
2.	"Communication" (コミュニケーション; Komyunikēshon)	3:57
3.	"Spring of Life" (instrumental)	3:49
4.	"Communication" (instrumental)	3:57
Total length:		15:34

== Credits and personnel ==
Details adapted from the liner notes of the "Spring of Life" CD single.

=== Song credits ===
- Ayano Ōmoto (Nocchi) – vocals
- Yuka Kashino (Kashiyuka) – vocals
- Ayaka Nishiwaki (A-Chan) – vocals
- Yasutaka Nakata – producer, composer, arranger, mixing, mastering.

=== Visual credits ===
- Yusuke Tanaka – director
- Takahiko Kajima – video producer
- Kazunali Tajima – camera
- Mikiko – choreographer

== Charts ==
Chart (2012)	Peak position
Japan (Oricon)	2
Japan Yearly (Oricon)	65
Japan (Billboard)	1
Japan Hot Airplay (Billboard)	2

== Certifications ==
Region	Certification	Certified units/sales
Japan (RIAJ) Physical single	Gold	100,000^{^}
Japan (RIAJ) Digital single	Gold	100,000^{*}
^{*} Sales figures based on certification alone.^{^} Shipments figures based on certification alone.

== Release history ==
Country	Date	Format	Label	Ref.
Japan	11 April 2012	CD single	Universal Music Japan, Perfume Records	
Japan	11 April 2012	Digipak	Universal Music Japan, Perfume Records	
Taiwan	11 April 2012	Digipak	Universal Music Japan, Perfume Records	
Japan	11 April 2012	Digital download	Universal Music Japan, Perfume Records	
United States	11 April 2012	Digital download	Universal Music Japan, Perfume Records	
Australia	11 April 2012	Digital download	Universal Music Japan, Perfume Records	
New Zealand	11 April 2012	Digital download	Universal Music Japan, Perfume Records	
Canada	11 April 2012	Digital download	Universal Music Japan, Perfume Records	
United Kingdom	11 April 2012	Digital download	Universal Music Japan, Perfume Records	
