= 575 (song) =

Song by Perfume

from the album JPN
- Released: July 14, 2010
- Recorded: 2010; Shibuya, Tokyo (Contemode Studios)
- Genre: J-Pop
- Length: 4:24
- Label: Tokuma Japan Communications; Universal Music Japan
- Songwriter: Yasutaka Nakata
- Producer: Yasutaka Nakata

"575" is a song recorded by Japanese recording girl group Perfume for their third studio album, JPN (2011). It was written, composed, arranged, and produced by Japanese musician and Capsule member Yasutaka Nakata. The song was included as a B-side track for the group's single, "Voice". It was also released exclusively to Uta stores in Japan on July 14, 2010. Musically, "575" was described as a mellow Japanese pop song. It marks the first time that the group perform in a rap structure, delivered after the first chorus. The song's title, and the structure of its verses, derives from the structure of haiku, a Japanese style of poetry which comprises a 5-syllable line, a 7-syllable line, and then another 5-syllable line.

Upon its release, the track garnered positive reviews from music critics, who praised the song's composition and the rap delivery. Due to the song being released digitally and as a B-side to "Voice", it was ruled ineligible to chart on Japan's Oricon Singles Chart. However, it peaked at number 73 on Billboard's Japan Hot 100 chart, and number four on the RIAJ Digital Track Chart. It was certified gold by the Recording Industry Association of Japan (RIAJ) for cellphone purchases of 100,000 units. A music video was originally to debut on their JPN tour in 2012, but the idea was scrapped. Instead, it was included on the live DVD.

== Background and composition ==
"575" was written, composed, arranged, and produced by Japanese musician and Capsule member Yasutaka Nakata. Alongside this, it was recorded, mixed, and mastered by him. The song was recorded in 2010 at Contemode Studios, Shibuya, Tokyo, by Nakata. It was selected as a B-side track to "Voice", the second single to the group's album JPN (2011). It also appeared on the album, listed at number 9 on the track list. The instrumental version appeared on the CD single and digital EP for the "Voice" single. The song was released exclusively to Uta stores in Japan on July 14, 2010.

Musically, the song has been described as a mellow Japanese pop song. It marks the first time that the group perform in a rap structure, delivered after the first chorus. Throughout a majority of the song, the girl's vocals are heavily processed with post-production tools such as vocoder and autotune. Only two English phrases are used in the song; these being the lyrics, "Give it up" and "Good night". Ian Martin from The Japan Times described the song's composition as, "a curiously mellow take on the 1990s ballad/rap hybrid J-pop formula." Perfume stated together that they were "very surprised, yet very anxious" about the rap section.

== Critical response ==
"575" received favorable reviews from most music critics. A staff editor from CD Journal gave the song a positive review. They compared the composition and delivery to the group's song "Macaroni", from their 2008 debut album Game. The reviewer praised the group's "brave" vocal delivery. Another editor from the same publication reviewed the album, and gave it a positive review. The reviewer complimented the song's rap section and praised the "new grounded" compositions. Ian Martin from The Japan Times gave the song a mixed review; despite his appreciate of the slow composition, he criticized, in general, the lack of "creativity" and "invention" through the second half of the album and felt these factors were presented throughout other projects by Nakata apart from Perfume.

== Commercial performance ==
Due to the song being released digitally and as a B-side to "Voice", it was ineligible to chart on Japan's Oricon Singles Chart because it does not count digital sales. However, it managed to chart on other record charts in Japan. It peaked at number 73 on Billboard's Japan Hot 100 chart and is the highest-charting non-single track from JPN. It then charted on the RIAJ Digital Track Chart, peaking at number four and was the group's highest-charting single on there. The song was certified gold by the Recording Industry Association of Japan (RIAJ) for cell phone purchases of up to 100,000 units. In conjunction with the sales of "Voice" and "575" on the CD Single, it was certified gold by the RIAJ for physical shipments of 100,000 units in Japan.

== Music video and live performances ==
Perfume member, Kashiyuka, singing in the music video for "575".

A music video was used as a backdrop projection for their Tokyo dome 2010 tour [12345678910], projected on all the screens. Instead, it was released on the limited edition DVD. It featured the girls singing the song in front of the song's title. Inter cut scenes of the live performance, and the girls getting ready for the show, were included in the video.

The song has been performed on one concert tour, and has appeared on one commercial in Japan. The song was used as the theme song for the KDDI Light Pool commercial in Japan. Japanese rapper, Kreva, performed a cover version of the song on Music Japan Broadcast in early 2011. The song was performed on their 2010 Tokyo Dome concert tour, where it was included during the second segment. It was included on the live DVD, released on February 9, 2011. The performance included the girls dancing around geometrical shapes and was positively received from music critics. Yuki Sugioka from Hot Express complimented the girls performance, alongside the stage production of the segment. The song was included on the group's compilation box set, Perfume: Complete LP Box (2016).

== Credits and personnel ==
Details adapted from the liner notes of the JPN album.

- Ayano Ōmoto – vocals
- Yuka Kashino – vocals
- Ayaka Nishiwaki – vocals
- Yasutaka Nakata – producer, composer, arranger, mixing, mastering.

== Chart and certifications ==
=== Weekly charts ===
Chart (2010)	Peak position
Japan Hot 100 (Billboard)	73
Japan RIAJ Digital Track Chart (RIAJ)	4

=== Certification ===
Region	Certification	Certified units/sales
Japan (RIAJ) Ringtone	Gold	100,000^{*}
^{*} Sales figures based on certification alone.

== Release history ==
Region	Date	Format	Label
Japan	July 14, 2011	Digital download	Tokuma Japan Communications; Universal Music Japan
Japan	August 11, 2010	CD single; DVD single; digital download	Tokuma Japan Communications; Universal Music Japan
United States	August 11, 2010	Digital download	Universal Music Japan
Australia	August 11, 2010	Digital download	Universal Music Japan
New Zealand	August 11, 2010	Digital download	Universal Music Japan
Canada	August 11, 2010	Digital download	Universal Music Japan
United Kingdom	August 11, 2010	Digital download	Universal Music Japan
Germany	August 11, 2010	Digital download	Universal Music Japan
Ireland	August 11, 2010	Digital download	Universal Music Japan
France	August 11, 2010	Digital download	Universal Music Japan
Spain	August 11, 2010	Digital download	Universal Music Japan
Taiwan	August 11, 2010	Digital download	Universal Music Japan

== See also ==
- "Voice" – Corresponding single to "575".
