= Spice (Perfume song) =

2011 single by Perfume

Single by Perfume

from the album JPN
- B-side: "Glitter"
- Released: November 2, 2011
- Recorded: 2011
- Genre: House; Synth-pop
- Length: 3:54
- Label: Tokuma Japan Communications
- Songwriter: Yasutaka Nakata
- Producer: Yasutaka Nakata

Perfume singles chronology
"Laser Beam/Kasuka na Kaori" (2011)	"Spice" (2011)	"Spring of Life" (2012)

"Spice" (スパイス; Supaisu) is a song recorded by Japanese girl group Perfume for their third studio album, JPN (2011). It premiered on November 2, 2011 as the fifth and final single from the album in Japan. It was written, composed, arranged, and produced by Japanese musician and Capsule member Yasutaka Nakata. The single also included the B-side track "Glitter", which appeared on the parent album. It was also released on June 19, 2013 through European and Oceanic regions, and June 25 in North America. Musically, "Spice" is a house song.

Upon its release, the track garnered mixed reviews from music critics. Some critics highlighted the song as one of Perfume's best singles from their album, whilst some felt the composition was uninteresting. It was also successful in Japan, peaking at number two both on the Oricon Singles Chart and Billboard's Japan Hot 100 chart. It was certified gold by the Recording Industry Association of Japan (RIAJ) for physical shipments of 100,000 units. An accompanying music video was shot by Shimada Daisuke; it features the girls performing the song in a dining room. It was performed on the group's 2011 JPN concert tour.

== Background and composition ==
"Spice" was written, composed, arranged, and produced by Japanese musician and Capsule member Yasutaka Nakata. It was recorded, mixed, and mastered by him. The song was recorded in 2010 at Contemode Studios, Shibuya, Tokyo by Nakata. Together with the album’s remaining material, "Spice" has partial rights by Nakata through Yahama Music Communications. The single also included the B-side track "Glitter"; another version, re-composed by Nakata, appeared on JPN instead. It premiered on November 2, 2011 as the fifth and final single from the album. It was also released digitally on June 19, 2013 through European and Oceanic regions, and June 25 in North America.

The maxi CD of the single contains both "Spice" and "Glitter", plus their instrumental versions. The cover artwork was photographed by Japanese photographer Hiroshi Nomura and features the girls sitting on a circle window. Musically, "Spice" was described as a house song with elements of pop music and synthpop. Paul Browne from J-Pop Go noted that the song "sees Perfume step down gear a bit for a more mid-tempo effort." A staff editor from Selective Hearing noted that the song incorporated elements of 80s synthpop music. Ian Martin from The Japan Times said the song incorporated elements of Westernised pop music.

== Critical response ==
Upon its release, "Spice" received mixed reviews from most music critics. Paul Browne from J-Pop Go selected it as one of the album's best tracks. A staff editor from CD Journal was positive in their review, complimenting Nakata's composition. A staff editor from Selective Hearing was mixed in their review of the song; saying that it "isn’t the greatest thing the group has done for an a-side but there’s enough to make it worth listening to. The layered vocals will probably hook most before they realize that they’ve heard all this before." As a result, the reviewer concluded that they would recommended the B-side "Glitter" over "Spice". Ian Martin from The Japan Times was particularly negative in his review, labelling the song an "otherwise unremarkable closing number..."

== Commercial performance ==
In Japan, "Spice" was successful on several record charts. It debuted at number two on the Oricon Singles Chart; it sold 75,688 units in its first week of sales. It was the group's fifth consecutive charting single to reach number two on that chart. The following week, the single fell outside the top ten to number 13, selling 7,136 units. It lasted for 10 weeks on the chart, totaling 90,471 units by the end of 2011. The song peaked at number two on Billboard's Japan Hot 100 chart. It was certified gold by the Recording Industry Association of Japan (RIAJ) for physical shipments of 100,000 units.

== Music video ==
The accompanying music video was directed by Shimada Daisuke. The group's outfits from the single cover sleeve was used again for the video shoot. The music video was released on October 27, 2011, through Tokuma Japan's official YouTube channel. The music video appeared on the DVD single. The music video also appeared on Perfume's DVD compilation sets for JPN and Perfume Clips (2014).

=== Synopsis ===
Perfume dancing on a table in the music video for "Spice".

The music video opens with several shots of a dining table; it includes uneaten sweets, foods, and small pink bird ornaments. The first verse features close-ups of the girls singing and dancing to the song, in front of a beige backdrop. The chorus section has three scenes of each member; Kashiyuka is seen laying down with an electronics cable in her hand; Nocchi is seen at the dining table; and A-Chan is seen under a table with a cable telephone. During the instrumental break, close-up shots (yet very blurry) features a fish bowl that have small fish swimming around. The second verse repeats the first verses video shoots.

The second chorus has the girls dancing on the table, knocking several pieces of food and Tupperware onto the ground. A-Chan is seen lying down on a pillow, whilst Kashiyuka balances a book and an apple on her head. Both of these scenes have them throwing several pieces of food onto the table. Nocchi is seen at the dining table, holding a fork and listen to music through her headphones. She witnesses a small door underneath a stool, opens it, and sees a small green room. In the room, a blurred image of a cup starts to become clear, and holds small candy. As the girls eat the pieces of candy, their cream-coloured dresses turn into the outfits from the cover sleeve from the single. The girls start dancing in the fish bowl, surrounded by glittery lights. The final scene has the girls looking through the small door again, only to witness the dining room table empty; the small cup with candy appears in beige colouring rather than full-on vibrancy.

== Promotion and live performances ==
The song and its B-side track has been used in commercials and television series within Japan. "Spice" was used as the theme song for the Japanese Tokyo Broadcasting System television series, Sengyoshufu Tantei. The B-side song, "Glitter", was first used in the commercial for Japanese company Kirin. The group's producer, Yasutaka Nakata, was heavily influenced by the image of the drama when he wrote "Spice"; it’s also the first time that he produced a soundtrack for them. The single was performed on their 2011 JPN concert tour, where it was included during the second segment. It was included on the live DVD, released in mid 2012. The song was included on the group's 180 Gram vinyl compilation box set, Perfume: Complete LP Box (2016).

== Track listings and formats ==
- Japanese CD single
1. "Spice" (スパイス) – 3:54
2. "Glitter" – 5:10
3. "Spice" (スパイス) (Instrumental) – 3:54
4. "Glitter" (Instrumental) – 5:10
- Japanese CD single
1. "Spice" (スパイス') – 3:54
2. "Glitter" – 5:10
3. "Spice" (スパイス) (Instrumental) – 3:54
4. "Glitter" (Instrumental) – 5:10
5. "Spice" (スパイス) (Video clip) – 5:22
- Digital download
1. "Spice" (スパイス) – 3:54
2. "Glitter" – 5:10
3. "Spice" (スパイス) (Instrumental) – 3:54
4. "Glitter" (Instrumental) – 5:10

== Credits and personnel ==
Details adapted from the liner notes of the parent album.

- Ayano Ōmoto (Nocchi) – vocals
- Yuka Kashino (Kashiyuka) – vocals
- Ayaka Nishiwaki (A-Chan) – vocals
- Yasutaka Nakata – producer, composer, arranger, mixing, mastering.
- Shimada Daisuke – video director
- Tokuma Japan Communications – record label

== Chart and certifications ==
=== Weekly charts ===
Chart (2011)	Peak position
Japan Daily Chart (Oricon)	2
Japan Weekly Chart (Oricon)	2
Japan Monthly Chart (Oricon)	4
Japan Yearly Chart (Oricon)	82
Japan Hot 100 (Billboard)	2

=== Certifications ===
Region	Certification	Certified units/sales
Japan (RIAJ)	Gold	100,000^{^}
^{^} Shipments figures based on certification alone.

== Release history ==
Region	Date	Format	Label
Japan	November 2, 2011	CD single; DVD single; digital download	Tokuma Japan Communications; Universal Music Japan
Australia	June 19, 2013	Digital download	Universal Music Japan
New Zealand	June 19, 2013	Digital download	Universal Music Japan
United Kingdom	June 19, 2013	Digital download	Universal Music Japan
Germany	June 19, 2013	Digital download	Universal Music Japan
Ireland	June 19, 2013	Digital download	Universal Music Japan
France	June 19, 2013	Digital download	Universal Music Japan
Spain	June 19, 2013	Digital download	Universal Music Japan
Taiwan	June 19, 2013	Digital download	Universal Music Japan
United States	June 25, 2013	Digital download	Universal Music Japan
Canada	June 25, 2013	Digital download	Universal Music Japan
