= Mirai no Museum =

Single by Perfume

from the album Level3
- B-side: "Daijyobanai"
- Released: February 27, 2013
- Recorded: 2013
- Genre: Dance-pop, electropop
- Label: Universal J
- Songwriter: Yasutaka Nakata
- Producer: Yasutaka Nakata

Perfume singles chronology
| "Spending All My Time" (2012) | "Mirai no Museum" (2013) | "Magic of Love" (2013) |

Music video
- "Mirai no Museum" on YouTube

"Mirai no Museum" (translation: "Future Museum") is a song by Japanese girl group Perfume from their fourth studio album Level3 (2013). The song was released as the album's third single on 27 February 2013. It was written, composed and produced by Yasutaka Nakata. The song is a dance pop track, which features instrumentation from synthesizers and keyboards. The track is translated to "Future Museum" and was used as the theme song for the Doraemon film, Nobita no Himitsu Dougu Museum.

"Mirai no Museum" became their eighth consecutive single to stall at number two in Japan. The track became their first charting single in Korea since their 2011 single "Laser Beam/Kasuka na Kaori". Yusuke Tanaka commissioned the accompanying music video for the single, which shows Perfume inside a comic book–style world. Perfume have performed the song in a number of live performances throughout Japan.

== Background and composition ==
Japanese producer and Capsule musician Yasutaka Nakata wrote, arranged, and composed "Mirai no Museum". Nakata has collaborated with all of Perfume's records and songs from 2003 onwards. It was recorded in Tokyo, Japan and was mixed and mastered by Nakata. It is a dance and electropop song, and incorporates instrumentation of a drum machine, synthesizer and keyboards.

== Reception ==
"Mirai no Museum" received mostly negative reviews from music critics. Writing for Land of Rising, Alex Shenmue said the song was one to skip. He felt that while the song was sung and produced well and catchy, “it doesn't fit the role of middle-section track in this album,” and “breaks the musical delivery.” He labelled it the “one true issue on the album.” Patrick St. Michael, writing for The Japan Times, said it was his least favorite single from the album and felt it was “painfully out of place.” Selective Hearings writer Nia labelled it a “dud” and “childish.” She said the song was the weakest and preferred their track "Hurly Burly" to replace the song, which was not featured on the album. A writer from CDJournal praised the “dreamy” and catchy production, but criticized the composition. Ian Martin, who had written their extended biography at Allmusic, had highlighted the song as an album and career standout.

The song charted in Japan, South Korea and Taiwan. Reaching number two on the Oricon Singles Chart, it became the group's eighth consecutive single to stall at number two. It was the group's last single to reach number two until their 2014 single "Cling Cling" reached the position and is their eleventh best-selling single there. The track also peaked at two on Japan Hot 100 chart. The song reached number twenty-three on the Gaon Foreign Album Chart in South Korea. The song was certified gold by the Recording Industry Association of Japan (RIAJ) for shipments of 100,000 units.

== Release and promotion ==
Selected as the third single of Level3, the song was released as an extended play digital download on 27 February 2013. Universal Music then released the single in the United Kingdom, New Zealand, Australia, Canada and the US. Two CD singles were issued; a standalone CD with all four songs, and a digipak that included a bonus DVD, a lyric sheet and a music video comic book.

"Mirai no Museum" was used as the ending theme song for the film Doraemon: Nobita no Himitsu Dōgu Museum, released in March 2013. Perfume debuted the track on Music Japan TV, where they sported the same outfit on the CD cover and performed the track. The group shot a promotional video for the film's release. The official music video was directed by Japanese director Yusuke Tanaka and premiered on Perfume's YouTube channel in June 2013. It features Perfume inside a comic book, trying to defeat a heavily armored warrior. They are accompanied by a mysterious mascot man, who tries to hide away from the warrior when it attacks.

== Credits and personnel ==
Details adapted from the liner notes of the "Mirai no Museum" CD single.

=== Song credits ===
- Ayano Ōmoto (Nocchi) – vocals
- Yuka Kashino (Kashiyuka) – vocals
- Ayaka Nishiwaki (A-Chan) – vocals
- Yasutaka Nakata – producer, composer, arranger, mixing, mastering.

=== Visual credits ===
- Yusuke Tanaka – director
- Takahiko Kajima – video producer
- Kazunali Tajima – camera
- Tetsu Moridera – lighting director
- Mikiko – choreographer
- Shinichi Miter – stylist
- Masako Osuga – make-up
- Yuki Shhimajiri – hair stylist
- Drop – animation designer

== Track listing ==
All tracks are written by Yasutaka Nakata.

CD
| No. | Title | Length |
|---|---|---|
| 1. | "Mirai no Museum" (未来のミュージアム, Museum of the Future) | 3:23 |
| 2. | "Daijyobanai" (だいじょばない, I'm Not Okay) | 3:06 |
| 3. | "Mirai no Museum" (Original Instrumental) | 3:23 |
| 4. | "Daijyobanai" (Original Instrumental) | 3:06 |

== Charts, peaks and positions ==
=== Weekly charts ===
| Chart (2013) | Peak position |
|---|---|
| Japan (Oricon) | 2 |
| Japan (Billboard) | 2 |
| Japan Hot Adult Contemporary (Billboard) | 9 |
| Japan Hot Animation (Billboard) | 1 |
| Japan Hot Airplay (Billboard) | 7 |
| Japan Hot Single Sales (Billboard) | 2 |
| South Korea Foreign Album (Gaon Chart) | 23 |

=== Certification ===
| Region | Certification | Certified units/sales |
|---|---|---|
| Japan (RIAJ) | Gold | 100,000^{^} |
^{^} Shipments figures based on certification alone.

== Release history ==
| Country | Date | Format | Label | Ref. |
|---|---|---|---|---|
| Japan | 27 February 2013 | CD single | Universal Music Japan, Perfume Records | |
| Japan | 27 February 2013 | Digipak | Universal Music Japan, Perfume Records | |
| Taiwan | 27 February 2013 | Digipak | Universal Music Japan, Perfume Records | |
| Japan | 27 February 2013 | Digital download | Universal Music Japan, Perfume Records | |
| United States | 27 February 2013 | Digital download | Universal Music Japan, Perfume Records | |
| Australia | 27 February 2013 | Digital download | Universal Music Japan, Perfume Records | |
| New Zealand | 27 February 2013 | Digital download | Universal Music Japan, Perfume Records | |
| Canada | 27 February 2013 | Digital download | Universal Music Japan, Perfume Records | |
| United Kingdom | 27 February 2013 | Digital download | Universal Music Japan, Perfume Records | |
