= Glitter (Perfume song) =

Song by Perfume

from the album JPN
- Recorded: 2010; Shibuya, Tokyo (Contemode Studios)
- Genre: Technopop
- Length: 5:10
- Label: Tokuma Japan Communications; Universal Music Japan
- Songwriter: Yasutaka Nakata
- Producer: Yasutaka Nakata

"Glitter" (capitalized as "GLITTER") is a song recorded by Japanese recording girl group Perfume for their third studio album, JPN (2011). It was written, composed, arranged, and produced by Japanese musician and Capsule member Yasutaka Nakata. The song was included as a B-side track for the group's single, "Spice". Musically, "Glitter" was described as a technopop song, influenced by dance music. Two versions were released; the original composition, and the remix that appeared on the parent album. It has appeared as the theme song for one commercial and television series in Japan.

Upon its release, the track garnered mixed to favourable reviews from music critics. Many critics believed it was better than the A-side single "Spice", both due to its production and commercial appeal. However, some criticized the album mix over the original edit. Due to the song being released digitally and as a B-side to "Spice", it was ruled ineligible to chart on Japan's Oricon Singles Chart. However, it peaked at number 88 on Billboard's Japan Hot 100 chart. An accompanying music video was shot by Kazuaki Seki; it features the girls performing and dancing to the song in a blue and black room. It was performed on the group's 2011 JPN concert tour.

== Background and composition ==
"Glitter" was written, composed, arranged, and produced by Japanese musician and Capsule member Yasutaka Nakata. Alongside this, it was recorded, mixed, and mastered by him. The song was recorded in 2010 at Contemode Studios, Shibuya, Tokyo by Nakata. Alongside the album's remaining material, "Glitter" has partial rights by Nakata through Music Communications. It was selected as a B-side track to "Spice", the fifth and final single to the group's album JPN (2011). A remixed version by Nakata appeared on the album, listed at number 3 on the track list. The original instrumental version appeared on the CD single and digital EP for the "Spice" single.

Musically, the song was described as a technopop song, influenced by dance music. Ian Martin from The Japan Times labelled the song an "uptempo" composition to the album. A staff editor from Selective Hearing said that "Glitter" was "up tempo, electro pop, vocal effected goodness." A staff reviewer from CD Journal noted elements of Technopop, a musical element that was very prominent in the group's earlier work. The reviewer also labelled the song's structure as "high tension[ed]" and "dreamy". Tetsuo Hiraga from Hot Express noted that the song was "high paced" in compared to the "calm down[ed]" composition of its A-side single.

== Critical response ==
Upon its release, "Glitter" received mixed to favourable reviews from most music critics. A staff editor from CD Journal reviewed the album remix, and was positive in their review; the complimented the up tempo composition and praised the catchy chorus. Paul Browne from Jpopgo.co.uk reviewed the album remix, and highlighted it as one of the best tracks on the album. A staff reviewer from Selective Hearing was generally favourable in their review; they said "The b-side Glitter is more along the average of what most would expect to hear from this group." In conclusion, they said, "To be honest I prefer 'Glitter' over 'Spice' just because it’s a lot more fun to listen to, even if it’s by the numbers for Perfume." Ian Martin from The Japan Times was mixed in his review; though he labelled it a "bouncy enough" effort, he stated, "but [it is] melodically insubstantial and, like the four new tracks on JPN,' feel like something Nakata could make in his sleep."

== Commercial performance ==
Due to the song being released digitally and as a B-side to "Spice", it was ruled ineligible to chart on Japan's Oricon Singles Chart. However, it managed to chart on other record charts in Japan. It peaked at number 88 on Billboard's Japan Hot 100 chart; it is the group's lowest charting single on that chart. In conjunction with the sales of "Spice" and "Glitter" on the CD Single, it was certified gold by the Recording Industry Association of Japan (RIAJ) for physical shipments of 100,000 units in Japan; it sold over 92,000 units in that region.

== Music video ==
Perfume dancing on a blue stage in the video "Glitter".

The accompanying music video was directed by Seki Kazuaki. The music video was released on November 2, 2011, through Tokuma Japan's official YouTube channel. The music video appears on Perfume's DVD compilation sets for JPN, and Perfume Clips (2014). The music video opens to the band and the song's name, superimposed on out-of-focus glitter and sparkles. It then has members dancing in front of a navy blue backdrop; Kashiyuka and A-Chan are kneeling down, while Nocchi is standing in the middle. As the first verse starts, the girls dance to the song whilst further apart from each other; glitter and sparkles overlap whist the girls dance throughout the song.

Close-up shots of each member, in front of a bright light, starts to intercept the dance scenes. As the pre-chorus starts, parts of the girls are distorted and fragmented into small glass pieces. Throughout the chorus and second verse, the girls dance in different directions whilst standing in a circle. During the bridge section, each member holds a circular mirror and reflects lighting from it. During the end chorus, sparks fall from the ceiling as the girls dance on a black stage. The final scene features the girls pose whilst standing in front of the sparks; a close-up of the sparks finishes the video.

== Promotion and live performances ==
"Glitter" has appeared on one commercial and one television series in Japan. It was first used in the commercial for Japanese company Kirin. It was briefly included on the Japanese TBS television series, Sengyoshufu Tantei. This was the same show that A-side single "Spice" was used as the theme song. The song was performed on their 2011 JPN concert tour, where it was included during the second segment. It was included on the live DVD, released in mid 2012. The song was included on the group's 180 Gram vinyl compilation box set, Perfume: Complete LP Box (2016).

== Track listing ==
- Digital download
1. "Glitter" – 5:10

== Credits and personnel ==
Details adapted from the liner notes of the parent album.

- Ayano Ōmoto (Nocchi) – vocals
- Yuka Kashino (Kashiyuka) – vocals
- Ayaka Nishiwaki (A-Chan) – vocals
- Yasutaka Nakata – producer, composer, arranger, mixing, mastering.
- Seki Kazuaki – video director
- Tokuma Japan Communications – record label

== Charts ==
Chart (2011)	Peak position
Japan Hot 100 (Billboard)	88

== Release history ==
Region	Date	Format	Label
Japan	November 2, 2011	CD single; DVD single; digital download	Tokuma Japan Communications; Universal Music Japan
Australia	June 19, 2013	Digital download	Universal Music Japan
New Zealand	June 19, 2013	Digital download	Universal Music Japan
United Kingdom	June 19, 2013	Digital download	Universal Music Japan
Germany	June 19, 2013	Digital download	Universal Music Japan
Ireland	June 19, 2013	Digital download	Universal Music Japan
France	June 19, 2013	Digital download	Universal Music Japan
Spain	June 19, 2013	Digital download	Universal Music Japan
Taiwan	June 19, 2013	Digital download	Universal Music Japan
United States	June 25, 2013	Digital download	Universal Music Japan
Canada	June 25, 2013	Digital download	Universal Music Japan

== See also ==
- "Spice" – Corresponding single to "Glitter".
