= Laser Beam =

2011 single by Perfume

Single by Perfume

from the album JPN
- A-side: "Kasuka na Kaori"
- Released: 18 May 2011
- Recorded: 2010; Shibuya, Tokyo (Contemode Studios)
- Genre: Electronic; 8-bit music
- Length: 3:31
- Label: Tokuma Japan Communications
- Songwriter: Yasutaka Nakata
- Producer: Yasutaka Nakata

Perfume singles chronology
"Nee" (2010)	"Laser Beam" (2011)	"Spice" (2011)

"Laser Beam" (レーザービーム; "Laser Beam") is a song recorded by the Japanese girl group Perfume for their third studio album, JPN (2011). It was written, composed, arranged, and produced by Japanese musician and Capsule member Yasutaka Nakata. The single also included the A-side track "Kasuka na Kaori", which appeared on the parent album. Originally scheduled for an 20 April 2011 release, it was postponed due to the 2011 Tōhoku earthquake and tsunami disaster. As a result, they both premiered on 18 May 2011 as the fourth single from the album in Japan. Musically, "Laser Beam" is an electronic song, influenced by 8-bit music.

Upon its release, the track garnered positive reviews from music critics. Some critics highlighted the song as one of Perfume's best singles from their album, and commended the composition. It was also successful in Japan, peaking at number two on the Oricon Singles Chart and Billboard's Japan Hot 100 chart. It was certified gold by the Recording Industry Association of Japan (RIAJ) for physical shipments of 100,000 units. An accompanying music video was shot by Kazuaki Seki; it features the girls performing the song in a futuristic labyrinth, trying to retrieve a suitcase by a mysterious man. It was performed on the group's 2011 JPN concert tour.

== Background and release ==
"Laser Beam" was written, composed, arranged, and produced by Japanese musician and Capsule member Yasutaka Nakata. It was also recorded, mixed, and mastered by Nakata. The song was recorded in 2010 at Contemode Studios, Shibuya, Tokyo by Nakata. Alongside the album's remaining material, "Laser Beam" has partial rights by Nakata through Yamaha Music Communications. It was selected as a double A-side track to "Kasuka na Kaori". Both tracks, with the former being remixed by Nakata, also appeared on the album, listed at number 3 and 8 on the track list.

Originally scheduled for an 20 April 2011 release, it was postponed due to the 2011 Tōhoku earthquake and tsunami disaster. As a result, they both premiered on 18 May 2011 as the fourth single from the album in Japan. It was also released on 19 June 2013 through European and Oceanic regions, and 25 June in North America. The maxi CD of the single contains both the A-side tracks, plus their instrumental versions. The cover artwork was photographed by Japanese photographer Takaki Kumada; the CD format uses the "Kasuka na Kaori" artwork (which has the girls surrounded by furniture, in front of a cityscape), whilst the DVD format uses the "Laser Beam" artwork (which has the girls pointing lasers towards the camera).

== Composition ==
Musically, "Laser Beam" is an electronic song, influenced by 8-bit music. Tetsuo Hiraga from Hot Express noted elements of 8-bit and dance music in its composition. A staff editor from Selective Hearing noted musical elements of electropop in its composition. Asian Junkie editor Random J reviewed the song on his personal blog, and stated about the album remix, "As with "Laser Beam" Yasutaka throws in some new melodic passages, arrangements and completely new key changes." He also identified 90s–influenced music as a key element to the song. A staff editor from CD Journal noted that the song was influenced by Technopop, a musical genre that the group had developed in their earlier years. The song was noted by critics for its lack of autotune and vocoder post-production tools, which was common in the group's earlier work.

== Critical response ==
"Laser Beam" received positive reviews from music critics. Tetsuo Hiraga from Hot Express was positive in his review, complimenting its composition and commercial appeal. Asian Junkie editor Random J reviewed the song on his personal blog, and was positive; he stated, "...the new melodic additions put a cool spin on the song. Yasutaka chops and stutters the absolute shit out of the post chorus sections in a way which cements his position as one of the best knob twiddlers in the music biz right now. "Laser Beam" was a great song in May. It's still great now." He identified it as an album highlight, and the album's best track. Ian Martin from The Japan Times was favorable in his review, stating, "The chorus... of "Laser Beam" are great examples of classic Japanese pop, taking the sounds of 1970s kayōkyoku and 1980s technopop and updating them in a way that manages to be at once nostalgic and defiantly modern." He identified it as one of the best tracks on the album.

Paul Browne from Jpopgo.co.uk enjoyed the track, asserting that, "'Laser Beam' certainly stands out from the others with its crunchy melody and crisp production, even in its album mix incarnation here." A staff editor from Selective Hearing was positive in their review; he/she said, "It took some time but for Perfume fans this was definitely worth the wait. Neither track outshines each other and both are worthy of a-side status. Which one you prefer depends on what your mood is." A staff editor from CD Journal reviewed the single release, and was generally favorable; he.she labelled it an "adorable pop tune". Another staff editor from the same publication reviewed the album mix, and praised the "stylish" new composition. A reviewer from Imprint, a newspaper printed by the University of Waterloo, complimented the song in their review. He/she said that, "Album mixes, "Laser Beam" and "Glitter", mark a twist to in style to fit a more punk style dance music."

== Commercial performance ==
Charting together with "Kasuka na Kaori", the double A-side singles debuted at number two on Japan's Oricon Singles Chart; it sold 93,828 units in their first week of sales. It was the group's fourth consecutive charting single to reach number two on that chart. The following week, the singles fell to number 10; it sold 13,615 units in their second week of sales. It lasted for 16 weeks on the top 300 chart, selling 124,613 units by the end of 2011; they were the 58th best selling single's in that region. Singularly, "Laser Beam" peaked at number two on Billboard's Japan Hot 100 chart. In South Korea, "Laser Beam" reached number 48 on their Gaon Digital Chart; it marks the group's first charting appearance in that region. The double A-side singles were certified gold by the Recording Industry Association of Japan (RIAJ) for physical shipments of 100,000 units.

== Music video ==
The music video was shot by Kazuaki Seki, in Yokohama on 11 March 2011. A power blackout caused from the 2011 Tōhoku earthquake prevented them from continuing filming, and the music video wasn't completed. Filming was then slightly reduced two weeks before the release. The concept of the video was "female spies", which is reflected in the makeup and clothing. The music video appeared on the DVD single. The music video also appeared on Perfume's DVD compilation sets for JPN, and Perfume Clips (2014). The music video appeared on a YouTube reaction video, hosted by The Fine Brothers; the video was part of the "Teens React to J-Pop" compilation.

=== Synopsis ===
Perfume dancing in an office for the video "Laser Beam".

The music video opens with a mysterious man holding a briefcase, walking down a futuristic hallway. As the music starts, the girls start dancing in a dark office with lights flashing in the background. As the chorus starts, the girls start shooting laser beams from their fingers, and dance to the song. The girls teleport into the futuristic labyrinth, looking for the man with the briefcase. Inter cut scenes features the group dancing and singing to the song, whilst in several different hallways. During the second chorus, the girls continue to search for him without any luck. The man enters the office, sits down on a sofa, with a helmet piece of shiny–coloured plastic on his head. The girls find the office entrance, with CCTV footage catching them enter the room.

As they enter the room, the man stands up and holds the briefcase. During the third chorus, they engage in battle and circulate the room for defence. Inter cut scenes have the group dancing to the song in the room. Perfume member Kashiyuka summons a mini version of herself, holding onto it, and casting a spell against the man, making him fall to the ground. As they celebrate, Perfume member Nocchi goes towards him and retrieves the briefcase. However, the man stands up and transforms into a polar bear; he then pushes Nocchi to the ground. Perfume member A-Chan throws an apple as a detraction, and the group attacks the bear by using laser beams. Defeated, the polar bear shrinks and transforms into a plush toy. A-Chan picks up the plush toy, and Kashiyuka opens the briefcase to witness a small gold ornament. The video ends with the group exiting the office.

== Promotion and live performances ==
"Laser Beam" was used in Kirin Brewery's Hyoketsu ads since on 2 February 2011. "Kasuka na Kaori" is also used in the ad for "Kirin Chu-hi Hyoketsu Yasashii Kajitsu no Three Percent". The single was performed on their 2011 JPN concert tour, where it was included during the first segment. It was included on the live DVD, released in mid 2012. The song was included on the group's 180 Gram vinyl compilation box set, Perfume: Complete LP Box (2016).

== Track listings and formats ==
- Japanese CD single
1. "Laser Beam" (レーザービーム) – 3:33
2. "Kasuka na Kaori" (微かなカオリ) – 4:49
3. "Laser Beam" (レーザービーム) (Instrumental) – 3:33
4. "Kasuka na Kaori" (微かなカオリ) (Instrumental) – 4:49
- Japanese CD and DVD single
1. "Laser Beam" (レーザービーム) – 3:33
2. "Kasuka na Kaori" (微かなカオリ) – 4:49
3. "Laser Beam" (レーザービーム) (Instrumental) – 3:33
4. "Kasuka na Kaori" (微かなカオリ) (Instrumental) – 4:49
5. "Laser Beam" (レーザービーム) (Short music video)
6. "Making of photo shoot"
- Digital download
1. "Laser Beam" (レーザービーム) – 3:33
2. "Kasuka na Kaori" (微かなカオリ) – 4:49
3. "Laser Beam" (レーザービーム) (Instrumental) – 3:33
4. "Kasuka na Kaori" (微かなカオリ) (Instrumental) – 4:49

== Credits and personnel ==
Details adapted from the liner notes of the parent album.

- Ayano Ōmoto (Nocchi) – vocals
- Yuka Kashino (Kashiyuka) – vocals
- Ayaka Nishiwaki (A-Chan) – vocals
- Yasutaka Nakata – producer, composer, arranger, mixing, mastering.
- Kaizuaki Seki – video director
- Tokuma Japan Communications – record label

== Chart and certifications ==
=== Weekly charts ===
Chart (2011)	Peak position
Japan Daily Chart (Oricon)	2
Japan Weekly Chart (Oricon)	2
Japan Monthly Chart (Oricon)	8
Japan Yearly Chart (Oricon)	58
Japan Hot 100 (Billboard)	2
South Korea Digital Songs (Gaon Chart)	48

=== Certification ===
Region	Certification	Certified units/sales
Japan (RIAJ)	Gold	100,000^{^}
^{^} Shipments figures based on certification alone.

== Release history ==
Region	Date	Format	Label
Japan	18 May 2011	CD single; DVD single; digital download	Tokuma Japan Communications; Universal Music Japan
Australia	19 June 2013	Digital download	Universal Music Japan
New Zealand	19 June 2013	Digital download	Universal Music Japan
United Kingdom	19 June 2013	Digital download	Universal Music Japan
Germany	19 June 2013	Digital download	Universal Music Japan
Ireland	19 June 2013	Digital download	Universal Music Japan
France	19 June 2013	Digital download	Universal Music Japan
Spain	19 June 2013	Digital download	Universal Music Japan
Taiwan	19 June 2013	Digital download	Universal Music Japan
United States	25 June 2013	Digital download	Universal Music Japan
Canada	25 June 2013	Digital download	Universal Music Japan
