= Spending All My Time =

- CD cover

Single by Perfume

from the album Level3
- B-side: ポイント (Point); Hurly Burly
- Released: August 15, 2012
- Recorded: 2012
- Genre: Dance; techno; EDM; electro
- Length: 3:53
- Label: Universal J
- Songwriter: Yasutaka Nakata
- Producer: Yasutaka Nakata

Perfume singles chronology
"Spring of Life" (2012)	"Spending All My Time" (2012)	"Mirai no Museum" (2013)

Music video
- "Spending all my time" on YouTube

"Spending All My Time" (stylized in sentence case) is a song by Japanese girl group Perfume from their fourth studio album Level3 (2013). The song was released as the album's second single on 15 August 2012. It was written, composed and produced by Yasutaka Nakata. The song is a dance pop track, which features instrumentation from synthesizers and keyboards. It is the group's first English-language single, and their second English effort since their 2008 track, "Take Me, Take Me", from their debut album Game.

"Spending All My Time" received favorable reviews from music critics, who commended the group's English-language attempt and praised the production and composition. The song became their seventh consecutive single to stall at number two on the Oricon Singles Chart in Japan. The track became their first charting single in Taiwan. Yusuke Tanaka directed the accompanying music video for the single, which shows Perfume as students in a psychic academy. Perfume has performed the song in a number of live performances throughout Japan.

== Background and composition ==
Japanese producer and Capsule musician Yasutaka Nakata had written, arranged and composed the song. Nakata has collaborated with all of Perfume's records and songs from 2003 onwards. It was recorded in Tokyo, Japan and was mixed and mastered by Nakata. It is a dance and techno, and incorporates instrumentation from synthesizer and keyboards. Writing for Land of Rising, Alex Shenmue noted "'Spending all my Time' brings back the techno sounds after the dreaming atmosphere of Sleeping Beauty [...]” "Spending All My Time" is the group's first English-language single to date, and their second overall. (Note: "Spending All My Time" is the group's first English-language single, but their second overall English song. The first was "Take Me, Take Me" which was on the group's 2008 album Game.) A writer for CDJournal had compared the song to works by French disc jockey David Guetta and Swedish House Mafia, but called the composition “a little different,” to their previous work.

Perfume had found recording English lyrics hard; member Kashiyuka explained, "'Spending all my time' is completely in English, so I struggled really hard with the pronunciation. When I’m singing along to the melody, my accent becomes more Japanese – like katakana-speak, so I’m wondering what people outside Japan will think when they hear it [...] Also, it’s not a particular word, but I’m interested to know which genre people will classify us in as artists."”

== Reception ==
"Spending All My Time" received favorable reviews from most music critics. Shenmue wrote that the new mix for the album “fits the album's concept.” Selective Hearing's writer Nia felt she could see the song alongside "Enter the Sphere" and "Party Maker" “blasting in a club, but there are also some surprisingly calm tracks on the album. It’s kind of like a series of crescendos and decrescendos”. Ian Martin, who had written their extended biography at Allmusic, had highlighted the song as an album standout and career standout. Patrick St. Michael, writing for The Japan Times, said the composition wasn't an “improvement” but commented that it was “simple, catchy pop”. A writer from CDJournal had favored the production and composition, comparing it to Western music.

The song charted in both Japan and Taiwan. Reaching number two on the Oricon Singles Chart, it became the group's eighth consecutive single to stall at number two. The song also reached number two on the Japan Hot 100 chart. The song reached number eight in Taiwan, becoming their first charting single in that country. (Note: Week references for G-Music: JPN 2012 week 15, "Spending All My Time" 2012 week 35, Love the World 2012 week 41, "Mirai no Museum" 2013 week 10, "Magic of Love" and Perfume World Tour 1st 2013 week 21, Level3 2013 week 40, "Sweet Refrain" 2013 week 48, "Cling Cling" 2014 week 30, Perfume 3rd Tour JPN and Perfume 4th Tour in Dome: Level3 2014 week 44.) In August 2012, "Spending All My Time" was certified gold by the Recording Industry Association of Japan (RIAJ) for shipments of 100,000 physical units.

== Release and promotion ==
Selected as the second single of Level3, the song was released as a stand-alone digital download on 15 August 2012. Two CD singles were issued; a standalone CD with which included the b-sides "Point" and "Hurly Burly", and a bonus DVD version. The first B-side "Point" was used as the commercial song for "KIRIN Chu-hi Hyoketsu Yasashii Kajitsu no 3%". The second B-side, "Hurly Burly" was used as the commercial song for "KIRIN Chu-hi Hyoketsu". "Hurly Burly" was used as the closing theme song to the 2014 short film Fastening Days.

The official music video was directed by Japanese director Yusuke Tanaka and premiered on Perfume's YouTube channel in June 2013. It features Perfume in school uniforms and shows them using psychic abilities including psychokinesis, spoon bending, and using Zener cards. The scenes of the psychic abilities are bookended by band member A-chan unsuccessfully opening a door that is locked from the outside.

== Track listing ==
All tracks are written by Yasutaka Nakata.

CD
No.	Title	Length
1.	"Spending all my time"	3:53
2.	"Point" (ポイント)	3:47
3.	"Hurly Burly"	5:13
4.	"Spending all my time" (Original Instrumental)	3:53
5.	"Point" (Original Instrumental)	3:47
6.	"Hurly Burly" (Original Instrumental)	5:13
Total length:		24:26

== Dimitri Vegas & Like Mike Remix ==
Digital Download
No.	Title	Length
1.	"Spending all my time (Dimitri Vegas & Like Mike Remix)"	4:38
2.	"Spending all my time (Dimitri Vegas & Like Mike Extended Mix)"	7:36

== Credits and personnel ==
Details adapted from the liner notes of the "Mirai no Museum" CD single.

=== Song credits ===
- Ayano Ōmoto (Nocchi) – vocals
- Yuka Kashino (Kashiyuka) – vocals
- Ayaka Nishiwaki (A-Chan) – vocals
- Yasutaka Nakata – producer, composer, arranger, mixing, mastering.
- Dimitri Vegas & Like Mike – remixing

=== Visual credits ===
- Yusuke Tanaka – director
- Takahiko Kajima – video producer
- Kazunali Tajima – camera
- Mikiko – choreographer

== Charts and certifications ==
=== Weekly charts ===
Chart (2012)	Peak position
Japan Singles (Oricon)	2
Japan Hot 100 (Billboard)	2
Japan Hot 100 Airplay (Billboard)	4

=== Certification ===
Region	Certification	Certified units/sales
Japan (RIAJ)	Gold	100,000^{^}
^{^} Shipments figures based on certification alone.

== Release history ==
Country	Date	Format	Label	Ref.
Japan	15 August 2012	CD single	Universal Music Japan, Perfume Records	
Japan	15 August 2012	CD/DVD	Universal Music Japan, Perfume Records	
Taiwan	15 August 2012	CD/DVD	Universal Music Japan, Perfume Records	
Japan	15 August 2012	Digital download	Universal Music Japan, Perfume Records	
United States	15 August 2012	Digital download	Universal Music Japan, Perfume Records	
Australia	15 August 2012	Digital download	Universal Music Japan, Perfume Records	
New Zealand	15 August 2012	Digital download	Universal Music Japan, Perfume Records	
Canada	15 August 2012	Digital download	Universal Music Japan, Perfume Records	
United Kingdom	15 August 2012	Digital download	Universal Music Japan, Perfume Records	
