= Level3 (Perfume album) =

Studio album by Perfume
- Released: October 2, 2013
- Recorded: 2012–2013
- Genre: J-pop; electropop; dance-pop; electro house
- Length: 64:39
- Language: Japanese; English
- Label: Universal J; Perfume
- Producer: Yasutaka Nakata

Perfume chronology
Love the World (2012)	Level3 (2013)	Cosmic Explorer (2016)

Alternative cover
- Limited edition cover

Singles from Level3
- 1. "Spring of Life" Released: April 11, 2012; 2. "Spending All My Time" Released: August 15, 2012; 3. "Mirai no Museum" Released: February 27, 2013; 4. "Magic of Love" Released: May 22, 2013

Level3 (stylized in all uppercase) is the fourth studio album by Japanese girl group Perfume. It was released on October 2, 2013, by Universal J and Perfume Records. Level3 marks Perfume's fourth consecutive album to be fully produced by Japanese producer and Capsule member Yasutaka Nakata, while Perfume contributes to the album as the lead, background vocalists, and executive producers through their self-titled record label. Recorded in Japanese and English language, Level3 is an electronic dance album that borrows numerous musical elements including J-pop, house music, and technopop.

Level3 was recorded and mixed in Japan, with the assistance of Nakata. Six different formats were released to promote the album; a standalone CD, a limited CD and DVD bundle, and a digital release. It was re-released in May 2014 as an additional bonus CD standalone edition, a 12-inch double LP, and a digital release. Two different artworks were issued for the album's cover sleeve; one has Perfume inside the set of their music video "1mm", whilst the second features body shots of Perfume and printed on transparent sheets.

Upon the album's release, it was met with favourable reviews from music critics. Critics noted the musical improvement from their previous release, and commended Nakata's production standards and its commercial appeal. Level3 was listed by several critics as one of the best albums of 2013. Commercially, Level3 was a success. It became Perfume's fourth studio album to reach the top spot on Japan's Oricon Albums Chart, and was certified platinum by the Recording Industry Association of Japan (RIAJ) for shipments of 250,000 units. The album charted on Korea's Gaon Album Chart and Taiwan's G-Music Albums Chart.

Four singles were released from Level3, including one promotional. Its lead single "Spring of Life" reached number two on Japan's Oricon Singles Chart and atop the Japan Hot 100 chart. The second, third, and fourth singles; "Spending All My Time", "Mirai no Museum", and "Magic of Love" achieved similar success, put peaked at two on both record charts respectively. Each single was certified gold by the RIAJ company, Perfume's only album to achieve this. Promotional single "1mm" reached number nine on the Japan Hot 100 chart. Perfume promoted the album on their 2013 Dome Tour.

== Background and development ==
In February 2012, Perfume departed from Tokuma Japan Communications and signed a deal with Universal Music Japan in order to release their work through global markets. Universal Music Japan partly-obtained rights of all of Perfume's work with Tokuma Japan Communication, but re-released JPN digitally in March 2012 in over fifty countries to begin their global releases; the group's earlier work were released afterwards. Two months later, Perfume announced their established self-titled vanity label that would co-release all of their material with Universal Music Japan. They later confirmed the label was to published their overseas releases and formats only. In August 2013, Perfume announced the release of their fourth studio album entitled Level3. Perfume and Universal Japan enlisted long-term collaborator, Japanese producer and Capsule member Yasutaka Nakata, to produce the album; this marks Perfume's fourth consecutive studio album to be fully produced by Nakata. Perfume began recording the album in Japan around mid-2012 with Nakata.

The material from Level3 took nearly two years to produce and record, making it one of Perfume's longer spanning projects to date. This is due to Perfume's scheduling conflicts with studio time and live performances at concerts and gigs. The material marks Perfume's fourth consecutive studio album to be fully composed, written, and arranged by Nakata. Perfume member Nocchi revealed that Nakata only let them listen to the song compositions one day before recording it; "It's so much fun to get new material, and getting it on the day of the recording ensures a good tension. We prefer not to practice too much in advance. If we listen too much, or practice too much, before the recording, our habits tend to overcome the freshness..." Perfume member A-Chan viewed Level3 as a concept album, stating "We see each album as being like a concept album. So Perfume right now is at a dance music stage [more than straight pop]. This doesn't mean we're going in this direction from here but this is just one of our aspects."

== Composition ==
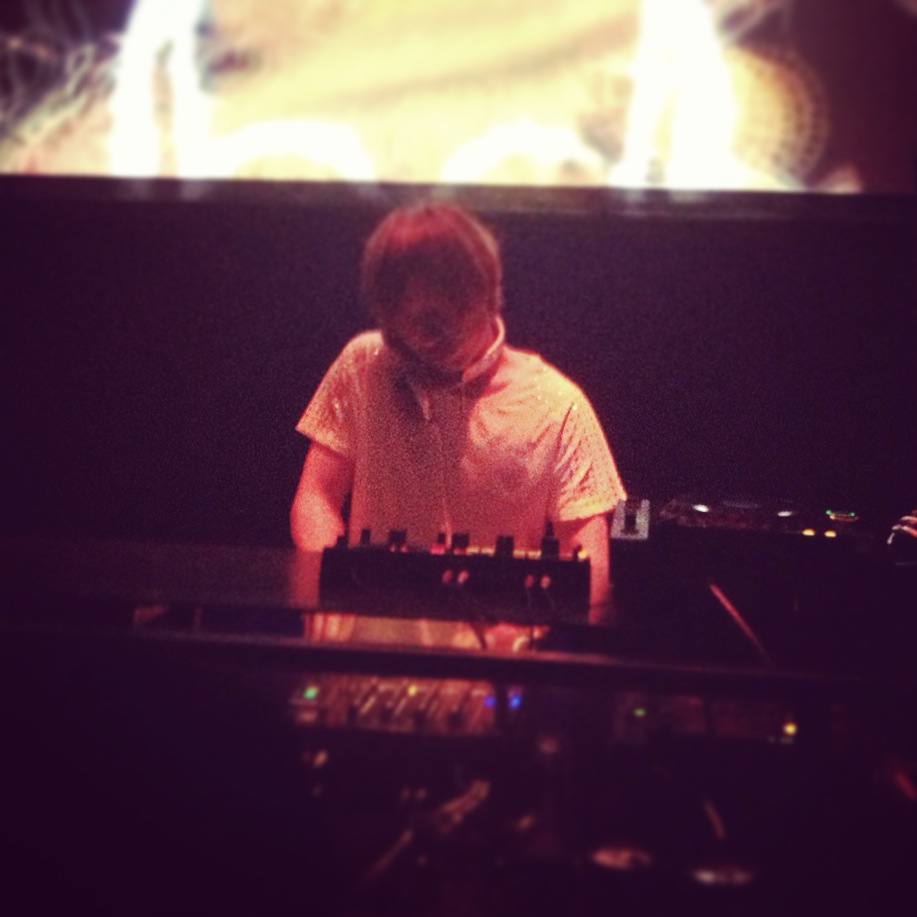
Perfume's music has been handled by Japanese producer Yasutaka Nakata ever since their debut (pictured).

Level3 is an electronic dance album that borrows numerous musical elements including pop, house music, and technopop. Daniel Robson from The Japan Times identified the album a "pop album" with no hint of J-pop music. Patrick St. Michael from the same publication and commented that the new album mixes were not "improvements" in musical development, but had called it "catchy, pop music." Noticing the "cohesiveness" of their music, Nia from the publication Selective Hearing had commented "The girls of Perfume remarked how Level3 was probably their most dance-able album."

In an interview with Complete Music Update, A-Chan stated about the musical development of the album: "It was as lot of fun! I enjoyed recording different types of songs. Different types of rhythms and atmosphere." Perfume member Kashiyuka further elaborated; "I enjoy recording our albums more than standalone singles because we get more songs! The diversity of the songs makes me excited, like I'm one of the listeners." According to A-Chan, she stated that Perfume and Nakata wanted to "experiment" more within 2013 for the album. However, due to intense work schedules, Perfume asked Nakata to create normal dance music.

As Perfume began to focus their activities on an international level, Level3 places some emphasis on English language lyrics; according to the lyric booklet provided by Universal Music Japan and Perfume Records, "Sleeping Beauty" is recorded completely in English, as is the majority of "Spending All My Time". (Note: According to the album notes and accompanying lyric sheet, there are two English ("Sleeping Beauty", and "Spending All My Time"), and twelve Japanese tracks (the remaining album tracks).) Regarding the use of English language Kashiyuka stated she found it hard: "I struggled really hard with the pronunciation. When I'm singing along to the melody, my accent becomes more Japanese – like katakana-speak, so I'm wondering what people outside Japan will think when they hear it..." Both Nocchi and A-Chan also found it hard recording the song in English due to their "shy" nature, but A-Chan has previous history of using English language and found it slightly easy.

== Songs ==
The album's opening track, "Enter the Sphere", is a rework from the entrance music on Perfume's first world tour; the re-worked version utilizes electro house beats and melodies, with the lyrics wanting fans to enter the world of music. "Spring of Life" is a dance song that fuses musical elements of club-oriented electronic and pop music. Tracks like "Magic of Love", "Clockwork", "Dream Land" and "Furikaeru to Iru yo" incorporate "calm" and "mellow" technopop and electropop elements. "1mm" was noted by critics for its 1980s synthpop and chillout elements. The girls vocal range was noted as the highest range than any other track from Level3. The fifth track, "Mirai no Museum", has been described as a "dreamy" and "childish" dance song that was often criticized for interrupting the musical delivery of other albums tracks; St. Michel reviewed the song and felt it was "painfully out of place" on the track list.

The seventh and twelfth album tracks; "Party Maker" and "Sleeping Beauty" were compared to the group's previous tracks "Butterfly" from Game (2008), and "Edge" from Triangle (2009). The reasoning was because of its composition; Alex Shenmue from Land of the Rising Sound noted that the composition was the main focus, and overlapped Perfume's vocals. The album contains three b-side tracks on the album; the drum and bass "Point" from "Spring of Life", the Middle Eastern music and Western-influenced "Handy Man" from "Magic of Love", and the "glitchy" "Daijobanai" from "Mirai no Museum". "Magic of Love", "Spending all My Time", and "Spring of Life" were remixed by Nakata for the album; The Japan Times' journalist Ian Martin reviewed the album on his own blog, said that "the new mixes do work a lot better here than [the other mixes] on JPN...".

== Release and packaging ==
Level3 was released in three different formats on October 2, 2013 by Universal Music Japan and Perfume Records. The standalone CD format features the fourteen tracks in a jewel case, with first press editions including an obi and a bonus poster. The CD and DVD format features the fourteen tracks, and a bonus DVD with the music videos to "1mm". The DVD also included two live performances in Japan. The album was housed in a unique transparent sleeve, that featured the album's booklet at the back of the CD. The jewel case featured 10 transparent sheets of Perfume that came apart once removed from the CD. First press editions included an obi and a bonus poster. The final format was a digital release that was released globally on October 16 that same year. The CD and DVD format was released in South Korea by Universal Music Korea, but used the cover sleeve and booklet from the standalone CD.

Both two cover sleeves for Level3 were photographed by Japanese photographer and designer Hiroshi Manaka. The standalone CD artwork has Perfume inside a grey room, standing behind neon LED lamps; A-Chan is seen closer to the camera, with Kashiyuka in the middle, and Nocchi furthest away. This look was further adapted in the music video for the group's single "1mm". The CD and DVD format features a body shot of Perfume in multi-coloured dresses; this look was furthered adapted in scenes from "1mm", and were printed on the 10 transparent sheets. The digital releases uses the standalone CD cover sleeve. The booklet and photo shoot were designed by Daichi Shiono.

=== Re-issue ===
Astralwerks is known as the label that created the electro music boom of the mid-1990s... Coming into the 21st century, Astralwerks has widened its outlook once again through discovering numerous unique and talented artists outside of America and supporting their American careers. Now, in preparation for the American debut of Japan's big stars Perfume, we’ve completed a magnificent remix. We look forward to continuing to pursue creative work together with them in the future.

— Glenn Mendingler, Astralwerks general manager, commenting about the re-release.

During the group's North American tour in September 2014, Perfume confirmed that they would re-release Level 3 worldwide. That same month, Perfumed also confirmed they signed a deal with North American dance record label Astralwerks to re-release the album digital and physically in the US on October 7, 2014. Daisuke Kikuchi from The Japan Times confirmed that the album would contain two new remixes of "Spending All My Time"; the first being a radio remix, and the second handled by Belgian production and DJ duo Dimitri Vegas & Like Mike. In a press interview with Astralwerks, Perfume revealed its re-release was to promote their concert tours in North America and prompt future prospects for American promotion and the American audience.

Regarding the release, A-Chan stated "This is the first time that someone other than Nakata-san has tampered with one of our songs, so I felt some resistance to it at first, but once I gave it a listen, it was really cool! I think everyone else should try it out at least once, too." Nocchi commended the duo for "the care they took with our image in keeping Perfume's emotionless vocal style and elegance." Kashiyuka hoped for future global prospects of their music, whilst stating "I feel so happy to be able to realize the idea of “delivering Japan's cool music to the world” that we’ve always talked about at our concerts. I think there may be some who’ll feel opposed to the remix, but you absolutely won't regret hearing it! Surely you’ll come to like the remix, and the original song, too, I think."

Level3: Bonus Edition was released worldwide in two formats; a standalone CD, and a digital release. The standalone CD format features the fourteen original and two remix tracks in a jewel case. Three additional LP editions were released in Europe; a clear, red, and yellow-coloured double vinyl LP set. The track listing of this LP release follows the original Japanese CD release, and does not include the American bonus tracks. The final re-release format was a global digital release. The CD and digital format uses the same cover from the original CD and digital album release, but includes the "Bonus Edition" text. The vinyl cover uses a standardized photo from the original CD and DVD album cover, with the CD and digital album cover used at the back.

To promote the album, the radio mix to "Spending All My Time" was released digitally in North America and Japan. The Bonus Edition of the album debuted at the number twelve on the Oricon Weekly Albums Chart with 4,724 copies sold, and stayed in the chart for three weeks.

== Critical reception ==
Professional ratings
Review scores
Source	Rating
Arcadey.net	(positive)
CD Journal	(positive)
The Japan Times	(positive)
Land of the Rising Sound	9/10 stars
SBS PopAsia	(positive)
Selective Hearing	(positive)

Level 3 received positive reviews from most music critics. A staff editor from CD Journal was positive in their review, commending album's "dance-oriented" composition and labelled that its overall appeal "shines". Patrick St. Michel from The Japan Times said "this is Perfume's longest album yet, and it can drag. Yet the strongest moments come when Nakata incorporates EDM sounds in novel ways." He went on to say "The bulk of Level3 feels like a live-show preview, but with enough great sonic moments sprinkled throughout to make it enjoyable at home, too." Nia from Selective Hearing had praised the album's cohesive and "interesting" structure, commenting "I found it to be Perfume's most cohesive and interesting album since Game. This is an album that provides the danciest of dance songs and the calmest of calm songs and everything in-between." She then commented that "It may not be as good as Game, but it comes pretty damn close."

Writing for Land of Rising, Alex Shenmue awarded the album nine out of ten. He commented "Everything is extremely well balanced [...] all of these aspects are present in Level3 and perfectly mixed together, maintaining a constant Techno/Dance soul that guarantees a clear personality to the entire album." He concluded "Level3 is the past, the present and the future of Perfume, the perfect portrait of this group and of their long and successful career. It's time to leave the past behind and realize that, right now, Level3 is the best Perfume album out there." Dr. J from SBS PopAsia commended the album's composition, and said "Overall, this album is a great way to consolidate all of Perfume's recent work into a package with a pretty, futuristic and multi-coloured bow [...]" A staff editor from Arcadey.net was generally positive, despite criticizing the "horrendous never-shoulda-been-a-single 'Mirai no Museum'". They said "It's an interesting album for the group because they’ve dived even further into the EDM world than ever before... With EDM being the new pop and all, a dance act like Perfume has no choice but to get even dancier if they wanna keep the swagger jackers at bay."

== Commercial performance ==
Level3 debuted at number one on the Japanese Daily Oricon Albums Chart, staying there up until the Sunday ranking which slipped to number two. This resulted in the album debuting atop the Japanese Weekly Oricon Albums Chart, with an estimate 165,000 sold units in its first week of sales. (Note: Sales provided by Oricon database and are rounded to the nearest thousand copies.) Level3 became Perfume's fourth consecutive studio album to debut atop the Oricon Albums Chart for both Daily and Weekly rankings. It slipped to number two the following week, shifting over 27,000 units in its second week of sales. It slipped to number six in its third week, shifting over 14,000 units in its third week of sales. It stayed in the top 10 for three weeks, and the top 300 with 11 weeks overall. This is Perfume's lowest spanning charting album on the Oricon Albums Chart to date, surpassing JPN which stayed in the chart for 13 weeks.

Level3 entered the Billboard Top Albums Sales Chart at the top spot, their fourth studio album to do so. Level3 was certified platinum in November 2013 by the Recording Industry Association of Japan (RIAJ) for shipments of 250,000 units. This is Perfume's third consecutive studio album to shift over 250,000 physical units. At the end of 2013, Level3 sold over 234,294 units in Japan and was ranked the 23rd best selling album in Japan. Level3 also reached number 43 on the South Korean Gaon Albums Chart and number nine on the Overseas Gaon Album Chart.

Moreover, Level3 became the second best-selling Yasutaka Nakata-produced album of 2013, behind Kyary Pamyu Pamyu's Nandacollection which sold 250,490 copies.

== Promotion ==
=== Singles ===
"Spring of Life" was released as the album's lead single on April 11, 2012. The song received favourable reviews from most music critics, who praised the song's dance composition and highlighted as an album stand out track. It achieved success in Japan, debuting at number two the Japanese Oricon Singles Chart and lasted for twelve weeks. It also reached the top spot on Billboard's Japan Hot 100 chart. The song was certified gold by RIAJ for shipments and digital sales of 100,000 units, shifting 200,000 units in Japan. An accompanying music video was shot for the singles; it features Perfume dancing and singing the song in a robotic laboratory.

"Spending All My Time" was released as the album's second single on August 15, 2012. The song received favourable reviews from music critics, who commended the group's English-language attempt and praised the production and composition. It achieved success in Japan, debuting at number two on the Japanese Oricon Singles Chart and lasted for ten weeks; it marks the group's seventh consecutive single to peak at number two. The song was certified gold by RIAJ for shipments of 100,000 units in Japan. Yusuke Tanaka directed the accompanying music video for the single, which shows Perfume dancing and making gestures in a locked room.

"Mirai no Museum" was released as the album's third single on February 17, 2013. The song received negative reviews from music critics, who felt it was childish and interrupted the composition sequence of the album. It achieved success in Japan, debuting at number two the Japanese Oricon Singles Chart and lasted for thirteen weeks, the longest charting single on the album; it marks the group's eighth consecutive single to peak at number two. It also reached the same position on Billboard's Japan Hot 100 chart. The song was certified gold by RIAJ for shipments of 100,000 units in Japan. Tanaka commissioned the accompanying music video for the single, which shows Perfume inside a comic book–style world.

"Magic of Love" was released as the album's fourth and final single on May 22, 2013. The song received positive reviews from music critics, whom complimented the song's production and composition. It achieved success in Japan, debuting at number three on the Japanese Oricon Singles Chart and lasted for eight weeks; this broke Perfume's record for the most consecutive top two singles with eight. It also reached the same position on Billboard's Japan Hot 100 chart. The song was certified gold by RIAJ for shipments of 100,000 units in Japan. Tanaka commissioned the accompanying music video for the single, which shows Perfume dancing in a room and features multiple figures of the members in different rooms.

=== Concert tour ===
In order to promote the release of Level3, Perfume embarked on a four-date dome tour named "Perfume 4th Tour in DOME 'LEVEL3'", including two dates at Kyocera Dome and two dates at Tokyo Dome. The tickets for both venues were sold out instantly. During the final performance of the tour on December 25, 2013, A-chan said, "Dome tours are amazing cause all the venues are domes, you know", which brought laughter to the audience. Afterwards, she started shedding tears, saying, "Thank you for spending this special day with Perfume."

== Track listing ==
All tracks are written by Yasutaka Nakata.

No.	Title	Length
1.	"Enter the Sphere"	3:35
2.	"Spring of Life" (album mix)	5:59
3.	"Magic of Love" (album mix)	4:16
4.	"Clockwork"	4:32
5.	"1mm"	4:17
6.	"Mirai no Museum" (未来のミュージアム; Museum of the Future)	3:21
7.	"Party Maker"	7:20
8.	"Furikaeru to Iru Yo" (ふりかえるといるよ)	6:15
9.	"Point" (ポイント; Pointo)	3:46
10.	"Daijyobanai" (だいじょばない; I'm Not Okay)	3:03
11.	"Handy Man"	4:05
12.	"Sleeping Beauty"	4:52
13.	"Spending All My Time" (album mix)	4:02
14.	"Dream Land"	5:16
Total length:		62:39

Limited edition bonus DVD
No.	Title	Length
1.	"1mm" (Video Clip)	4:19
2.	"Zutto suki dattanjake: Sasurai no Menkata Perfume Fes!! Memorial"	27:49
3.	"Perfume no Tada Tada Radio ga Suki dakara Radio!"	51:52

Bonus edition bonus tracks
No.	Title	Length
15.	"Spending All My Time" (radio edit)	3:02
16.	"Spending All My Time" (DV&LM remix)	4:37

== Personnel ==
Credits adapted from the liner notes of Level3.

- Michiyo Goda – product coordination
- Tatsuro Hatanaka – supervision
- Shoji Steve Inoda – A&R
- Masahiro Kazumoto – executive producer
- Hiroshi Manaka – photography
- Yasutaka Nakata – arrangement, production
- Yusuke Oka – product management
- Yokichi Osato – supervision
- Kazuaki Seki – art direction
- Daichi Shiono – design
- Kazumasa Takase – product management

== Charts ==
=== Weekly charts ===
Chart (2013)	Peak position
Japanese Albums (Oricon)	1
South Korean Albums (Gaon)	43
US World Albums (Billboard)	8

=== Monthly charts ===
Chart (2013)	Peak position
Japanese Albums (Oricon)	3

=== Year-end charts ===
Chart (2013)	Position
Japanese Albums (Oricon)	23

== Certifications ==
Certifications for Level3
Region	Certification	Certified units/sales
Japan (RIAJ)	Platinum	234,294

== Release history ==
Release dates and formats for Level3
Region	Date	Format	Edition	Label	Ref.
Japan	October 2, 2013	CD	Standard	Universal J; Perfume	
Japan	October 2, 2013	CD + DVD	Limited	Universal J; Perfume	
Taiwan	October 4, 2013	CD	Standard	Universal	
Taiwan	October 4, 2013	CD + DVD	Limited	Universal	
Japan	October 16, 2013	Digital download	Standard	Universal J; Perfume	
South Korea	October 16, 2013	CD	Standard	Universal	
Germany	October 18, 2013	CD; digital download	Standard	Universal	
Germany	October 18, 2013	CD + DVD	Limited	Universal	
Japan	May 14, 2014	LP	Standard	Universal J; Perfume	
United Kingdom	October 6, 2014	Digital download	Bonus Edition	Wrasse	
Japan	October 7, 2014	Digital download	Bonus Edition	Universal J; Perfume	
Japan	October 22, 2014	CD	Bonus Edition	Universal J; Perfume	
United Kingdom	October 27, 2014	CD	Bonus Edition	Wrasse	
