= Horikoshi High School =

Coordinates: 35.701111°N 139.6765°E

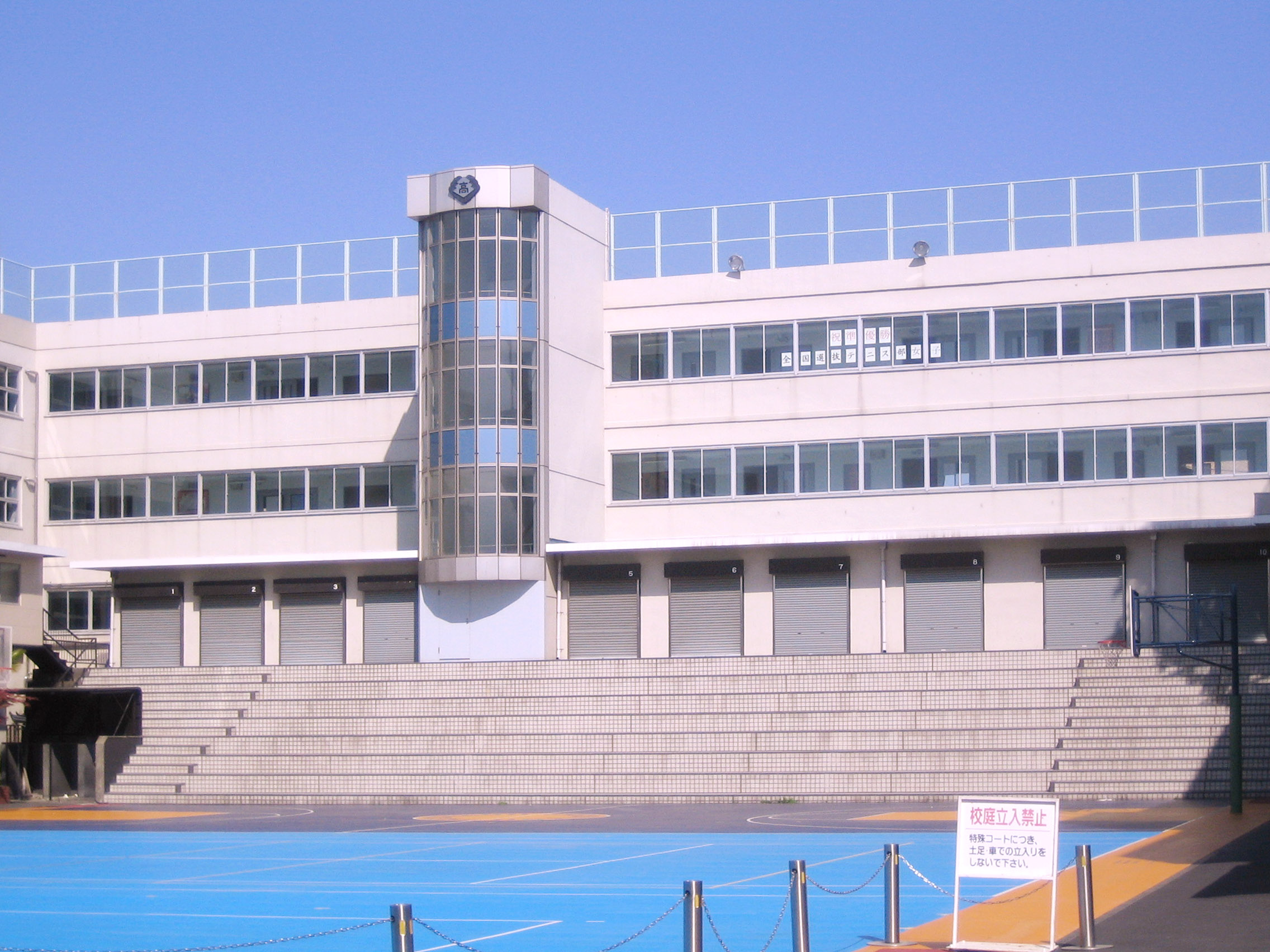
- Nakano, Tokyo; Japan

Information
- Type: Private
- Established: 1923
- Website: horikoshigakuen.ed.jp

Horikoshi High School (Japanese: 堀越高等学校, Hepburn: Horikoshi Kōtō Gakkō) is a private high school in Nakano, Tokyo, Japan. The school was founded by Chiyo Horikoshi in 1923.

Due to its trait course (formerly the entertainment activities course) and the physical education course for entertainers and athletes who have difficulty attending school full-time, Horikoshi High School has been attended by many Japanese celebrities.

== History ==
In April 1923, Chiyo Horikoshi, who had founded Wayo Sewing Girls' School, a predecessor of Wayo Women's University, established Horikoshi Girls' High School. The school was reorganized as Horikoshi Junior High School and Horikoshi High School in 1947; four years later, the school would be renamed Horikoshi Gakuen Educational Corporation under the Private Schools Act. The school became co-educational in 1957. During 1973, the 50th anniversary of the school's founding, the physical education course and entertainment activity courses were established. Horikoshi Junior High School was abolished in 1987.

== Academics ==
=== Courses of study ===
There are four courses of study: further education and career selection course, physical education course, ikuei course, and trait course.

The further education and career selection course is for students aiming to advance to higher education, such as university or vocational school, or find employment. In the second year, the class is divided into two: a liberal arts class and a science class. Students attend Meisei University and Technos International College for one day each.

The physical education course is for students who want to be active in sports. Facilities are often shared with Eimeikan High School.

The ikuei course is for the education of gifted students. There are differences within course content in humanities, science, and mathematics courses, and the tuition fee is also different.

The trait course, formerly known as the entertainment activities course, is a course for those active in the professional world, such as singers, actors, and athletes. Students have more elective subjects and there is increased flexibility in the curriculum. If a student is unable to make up classes due to entertainment activities or other commitments, there are cases in which the school allows the student to be promoted to a higher grade or graduate without attending at all.

== Student life ==
=== Lawsuit ===
In 2021, a female former student, who was advised to voluntarily leave as she violated school rules prohibiting male–female relationships, filed a lawsuit against the school corporation seeking damages. In November 2019, a meeting had been held regarding the relationship between the female student and a male student, third-year students at the time, and the student had been advised to voluntarily leave the school. Her university recommendation was also rescinded, so she voluntarily withdrew from the school and transferred to another high school. On November 30, 2022, the Tokyo District Court ordered Horikoshi High School to pay ¥980,000 (equivalent to ¥1,040,000 in 2024) in damages, stating that the recommendation to voluntarily withdraw without providing any educational guidance was unreasonable based on socially accepted principles. Regarding the school policy prohibiting male–female relationships, the court judged it to be reasonable and effective in allowing students to focus on their studies.

== Notable alumni ==
=== Entertainment ===
- Yumi Adachi (1999), actress and singer
- Yū Aoi (2004), actress and model
- Daiki Arioka, singer, actor, and member of Hey! Say! JUMP
- Yuri Chinen (2012), singer, actor, and member of Hey! Say! JUMP
- Tsuyoshi Domoto (1998), musical artist, actor, and member of KinKi Kids
- Miwako Fujitani, actress
- Tatsuya Fujiwara, actor (did not graduate)
- Kyoko Fukada (2001), actress and singer
- Saki Fukuda (2009), actress and singer
- Minami Hamabe (2019), actress
- Yu Hasebe (2004), actress, singer, and model
- Jun Hasegawa (2004), model
- Manami Hashimoto (2003), gravure idol and actress
- Aya Hirayama, actress
- Minako Honda (1986), singer
- Ichikawa Danjūrō XIII (1997), actor and stage producer
- Kimiko Ikegami, actress
- Toma Ikuta (2003), actor
- Goro Inagaki, musician, actor, and former member of SMAP
- Hiromi Iwasaki, singer
- Ryunosuke Kamiki, actor
- Nobuaki Kaneko (1999), drummer and actor
- Yuka Kashino (2007), singer, dancer, and member of Perfume
- Ai Kato (2001), actress and idol
- Ryo Katsuji, actor and voice actor
- Mayuko Kawakita (2011), actress and model
- Mayo Kawasaki, actor and singer
- Umika Kawashima, actress
- Hiromitsu Kitayama (2004), singer and actor
- Ryoko Kobayashi (2008), actress
- Teppei Koike (2004), actor and singer
- Sakura Komoriya (2018), singer and former member of X21
- Tomoka Kurokawa (2008), actress
- Tsuyoshi Kusanagi, actor, singer, and former member of SMAP
- Shioli Kutsuna (2011), actress
- Ryuhei Matsuda, actor (did not graduate)
- Jun Matsumoto (2002), singer, actor, and member of Arashi
- Masahiro Matsuoka, drummer and actor
- Yoko Minamino (1986), actress and singer
- Haruma Miura (2009), actor and singer
- Asami Mizukawa, actress
- Nana Mizuki (1998), singer and voice actress
- Hiroko Moriguchi, singer and tarento
- Yuto Nakajima (2012), singer, actor, and member of Hey! Say! JUMP
- Nakamura Kankurō VI (1999), actor
- Shichinosuke Nakamura, actor
- Riko Narumi (2011), actress and model
- Ayaka Nishiwaki (2007), singer, dancer, and member of Perfume
- Goro Noguchi, singer and actor
- Shūhei Nomura, actor
- Yōko Oginome, singer and actress
- Junichi Okada (1999), actor and singer
- Yukiko Okada (1986), singer and actress
- Ayano Ōmoto (2007), singer, dancer, and member of Perfume
- Ichika Osaki (2019), actress
- Misako Renbutsu (2009), actress
- Anri Sakaguchi, entertainer
- Ayana Sakai (2004), actress
- Hiroyuki Sanada, actor
- Eriko Sato, actress
- Hitomi Sato (1998), actress
- Amane Shindō (2023), voice actress
- Yu Shirota (2004), actor and singer
- Kana Tachibana (2004), singer
- Ai Takabe (2007), former actress
- Hikaru Takahashi (2020), actress and model
- Issey Takahashi (1999), actor and singer
- Hanako Takigawa, actress, tarento, and gravure idol
- Koki Tanaka (2004), singer-songwriter and actor
- Ritsuko Tanaka, actress and singer
- Rakuto Tochihara (2008), businessman and former actor
- Rie Tomosaka, actress and singer
- Aya Ueto (2004), actress and singer
- Yuya Yagira, actor
- Ryosuke Yamada (2012), singer, actor, and member of Hey! Say! JUMP
- Sayaka Yamaguchi, actress
- Tomohisa Yamashita (2004), singer, actor, and former member of NEWS
- Hikaru Yaotome (2009), singer, actor, and member of Hey! Say! JUMP

=== Sports ===
- Hirokazu Ibata, manager for the Japan national baseball team
- Hisashi Iwakuma, former professional pitcher
- Yudai Iwama, midfielder for ReinMeer Aomori
- Junri Namigata, professional tennis player
- Katsunori Nomura, coach for Hanshin Tigers
- Shuto Okaniwa, right back for Omiya Ardija
- Kazuya Ōshima, professional racing driver

== See also ==
- List of high schools in Tokyo
