= Nee (Perfume song) =

Single by Perfume

from the album JPN
- B-side: "Fake It"
- Released: November 10, 2010
- Recorded: 2010
- Genre: J-pop, electropop, house, Dance-pop
- Label: Tokuma Japan Communications
- Songwriter: Yasutaka Nakata
- Producer: Y. Nakata

Perfume singles chronology
| "Voice" (2010) | "Nee" (2010) | "Laser Beam/Kasuka na Kaori" (2011) |

Music videos
- "Nee" on YouTube
- "Fake it" on YouTube

"Nee" (ねぇ; "Hey") is the seventeenth single released by Japanese girl group Perfume. "Nee" is used in a tie-in campaign with Japanese apparel brand Natural Beauty Basic, as well as the opening song for the anime Koneko no Chi Ponponra Daibōken. The full version of "Nee" was aired on Perfume's radio program Perfume Locks on 21 October 2010. The single was released on November 10, 2010 in Japan.

== Promotion and music video ==
"Nee" is being used as the theme song for Natural Beauty Basic, like previous single "Natural ni koishite" was used. Like "Natural ni koishite", the video for "Nee" featured outfits created by the clothing line that were simultaneously made available on the website. The music video features the girls dancing on a hexagonal platform, surrounded by winter scenery. At first, each member of Perfume is shown individually and, through the use of CG, appears on screen three times dancing. In the second half, all three members are shown together, with each part of their choreography coming together to create an elaborate dance performance. These scenes are interspersed with Perfume posing against and wandering through a white set of white cutouts of trees, street signs and buildings.

The video, directed by Kodama Yuichi, was also the basis for four commercials for Natural Beauty Basic. Much like the commercials for "Natural ni koishite", one commercial was made for each member of Perfume dancing with copies of themselves, while the final version is a static shot showing the group choreography.

== Track listing ==
All tracks are written by Yasutaka Nakata.

CD
| No. | Title | Length |
|---|---|---|
| 1. | "Nee" (ねぇ ("Hey")) | 4:27 |
| 2. | "FAKE IT" | 4:12 |
| 3. | "Nee" (Original Instrumental) | 4:27 |
| 4. | "FAKE IT" (Original Instrumental) | 4:11 |

DVD
| No. | Title | Director | Length |
|---|---|---|---|
| 1. | "Nee" | Yuichi Kodama |

== Charts ==
| Chart (2010) | Peak position |
|---|---|
| Billboard Adult Contemporary Airplay | 3 |
| Billboard Japan Hot 100 | 2 |
| Oricon weekly singles | 2 |
| Oricon monthly singles | 7 |
| Oricon yearly singles | 64 |
| RIAJ Digital Track Chart Top 100 | 11 |

== Certifications ==
| Region | Certification | Certified units/sales |
|---|---|---|
| Japan (RIAJ) | Gold | 100,000^{^} |
^{^} Shipments figures based on certification alone.

== Covers ==
Sakura Gakuin, a training group from Amuse, covered the song on their 2017 Nendo Album.
