= Akari Yura =

Japanese singer and model

Akari Yura 由良 朱合
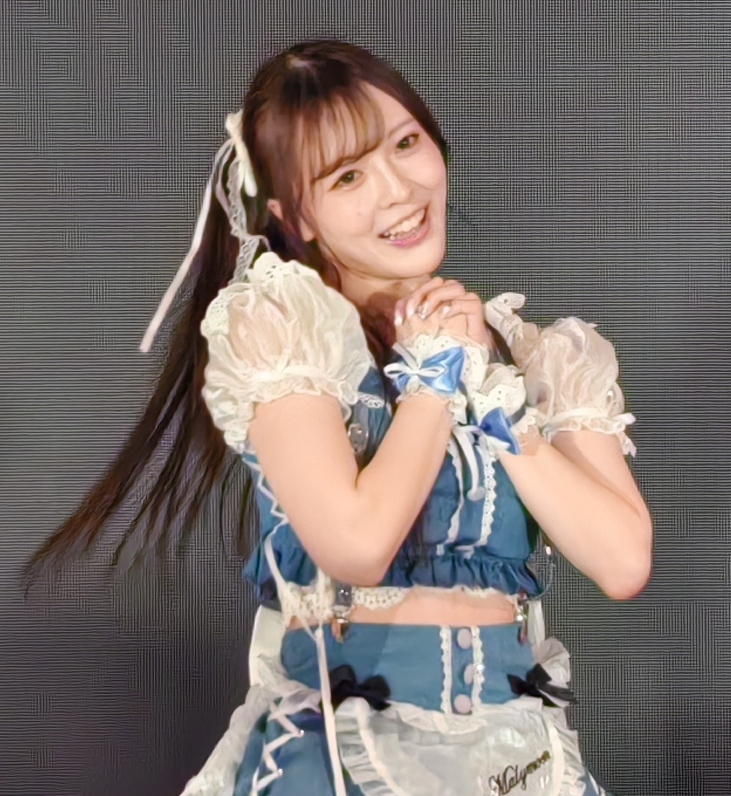
- Yura in 2026

Background information
- Born: 12 March 1999 (age 27)
- Origin: Hiroshima Prefecture, Japan
- Occupations: Singer; voice actress; model
- Years active: 2014–present
- Member of: UniChord
- Formerly of: Splash; STU48

Akari Yura (Japanese: 由良 朱合, Hepburn: Yura Akari; born 12 March 1999) is a Japanese singer, voice actress, and model from Hiroshima Prefecture affiliated with Platinum Production. Wanting to become a Japanese idol since childhood, she was educated at Actor's School Hiroshima and was a member of their idol group Splash. She spent some time as a member of STU48, before becoming a gravure idol. Since 2022, she has been part of the musical group UniChord in the D4DJ multimedia franchise, which includes portraying the character Kokoa Shinomiya.

== Biography ==
Akari Yura, a native of Hiroshima Prefecture, was born on 12 March 1999, the second of three siblings. As a young child, she was a fan of Morning Musume and wanted to become a Japanese idol, and she started taking part in auditions while in sixth grade. She was educated at Actor's School Hiroshima (ASH), where she was in the same graduating class as future STU48 teammate Chiho Ishida.

She joined ASH's idol group Splash in April 2014. In November 2017, she was one of the 68 finalists in the third round of the 3rd AKB48 Group Draft Conference, and in January 2018, she was selected by STU48 in the third round. In July 2019, she made her STU48 debut in their third single "Daisuki na Hito", but left STU48 the next month.

She made her gravure idol debut in the 18 May 2020 issue of Weekly Playboy, and she later appeared as the gravure model on the 11 June 2020 issue of Weekly Young Jump. In July 2020, she announced that she had signed a contract with Platinum Production. She was an official ambassador at the Tokyo Gravure Idol Festival 2021 Online in October 2021.

In October 2022, she became part of the D4DJ franchise as Kokoa Shinomiya, one of four members of UniChord.

== Filmography ==
=== Video games ===
Year	Title	Role(s)	Ref
2022	D4DJ Groovy Mix	Kokoa Shinomiya	
2026	Nekopara: Sekai Connect	Sora	

=== TV series ===
Year	Title	Role(s)	Ref
2024	Love Live! School Idol Musical the Drama	Maaya Mikasa	
2025	Catch Me at the Ballpark!	Miku	
