= Himeka Nakamoto =

Former Nogizaka46 member

- 中元 日芽香
- Born: April 13, 1996 (age 30); Hiroshima, Japan
- Education: Waseda University
- Occupations: Mental health counselor; radio host; author; idol
- Years active: 2009–present
- Agent: Nogizaka46, LLC
- Spouse: Unknown (m. 2024)
- Children: 1
- Relatives: Suzuka Nakamoto (sister)
- Musical career
- Also known as: Himetan (ひめたん)
- Genres: J-pop
- Instrument: Vocals
- Years active: 2009–2017
- Label: N46Div.
- Formerly of: Nogizaka46; Tween; SPL∞ASH
- Website: nakamotohimeka.com

Himeka Nakamoto (中元 日芽香, Nakamoto Himeka; born April 13, 1996) is a Japanese mental health counselor, radio host, author, and former idol. She was a first-generation member of the idol group Nogizaka46.

== Early life ==
Nakamoto was born in Hiroshima on April 13, 1996. She is the middle child of three sisters; her younger sister, Suzuka (born 1997), is best known as the lead singer of Babymetal under the stage name Su-metal. She enrolled in Actor's School Hiroshima as part of the 16th batch in 2006, joining Suzuka, who enrolled in the 15th batch the same year. They performed in a duet called Tween. She was also a member of the school's idol group SPL∞ASH.

== Career ==
=== Entertainment ===
Nakamoto passed the auditions for Nogizaka46 on August 21, 2011, and joined as a first generation member. Her audition song was "Aitakatta" by AKB48. In the group, she was known for her cheerful "Himetan" persona and signature pose, the "Himetan Beam" (ひめたんびーむ). She was also the lead vocalist of Nogidan, the rock subunit of Nogizaka46. In the sixth season of NogiBingo!, she served as assistant MC. She was also an assistant MC on the NHK Radio 1 program Radirer! Sunday.

Nakamoto went on hiatus from January to April 2017, citing poor health; this was later revealed to be a form of adjustment disorder and eating disorder, which she began to experience a few days after joining Nogizaka46. On August 6, she announced in a live broadcast of Radirer! Sunday that she would graduate from Nogizaka46. Her final performance as a Nogizaka46 member took place at the Tokyo Dome on November 7–8, 2017. On November 8, "Last Number", a collaboration single between her and Radio Fish, the boy band formed by Radirer! Sunday hosts Oriental Radio, was released. Her final blog post on the official Nogizaka46 blog was published on December 22, 2017.

=== Mental health ===
Nakamoto became interested in pursuing a career in mental health after attending therapy while a member of Nogizaka46. She completed training as a hand reflexology counselor and in cognitive behavioral therapy, then joined the e-school of Waseda University's Faculty of Human Sciences in April 2018. She graduated in March 2023, and launched her mental health counseling website eight months later.

While continuing her studies, Nakamoto obtained her mental health counselor certification from the Japan Promotion Counselor Association. She currently provides counseling through her Skype-based service "Monica and Me Counseling Salon" (カウンセリングサロン モニカと私), which accommodates those who cannot leave their homes or are concerned about the stigma around mental health issues. Like several other former Nogizaka46 members, she is still signed to the Nogizaka46 management and has made public appearances related to her current occupation. She had her own consultation segment on the NHK Hiroshima radio program Hiroshima Koiraji (ひろしまコイらじ) from March 2021, and hosts the podcast Himeka Nakamoto's 'Na' on Nippon Cultural Broadcasting starting June.

Nakamoto's autobiography, Thank You, Me: Graduating from Nogizaka46 and Becoming a Psychological Counselor, was released in June 2021. Her next book, I'll Listen to Anything: Himeka Nakamoto's Counseling Room, was released in December 2023.

== Personal life ==
In February 2024, Nakamoto announced her marriage to an undisclosed man. She owns a Yorkshire Terrier named Monica (モニカ), who functions as the mascot for her counseling business. On November 21, 2025 Nakamoto announced on her Instagram story the birth of her daughter.

== Appearances ==
=== Radio ===
Year	Title	Network	Notes	Ref.
2021	Hiroshima Koiraji	NHK Hiroshima		
2021–present	Himeka Nakamoto's 'Na'	PodcastQR (NCR)		

== Bibliography ==
Title	Release date	Publisher	Notes	ISBN
Thank You, Me: Graduating from Nogizaka46 and Becoming a Psychological Counselor (Note: ありがとう、わたし～乃木坂46を卒業して、心理カウンセラーになるまで, Arigatō, watashi ~ Nogizaka46 o sotsugyō shite, shinri kaunserā ni naru made)	June 22, 2021	Bungeishunjū	Autobiography	ISBN 978-4163913919
I'll Listen to Anything: Himeka Nakamoto's Counseling Room (Note: なんでも聴くよ。中元日芽香のお悩みカウンセリングルーム, Nandemo kiku yo. Nakamoto Himeka no Onayami Kaunseringu Rūmu)	December 7, 2023	Bungeishunjū		ISBN 978-4163917900
