= Voice (Perfume song) =

Single by Perfume

from the album JPN
- B-side: "575"
- Released: August 11, 2010
- Genre: Dance-pop, trance, house
- Length: 4:12
- Label: Tokuma Japan Communications
- Songwriter: Yasutaka Nakata
- Producer: Yasutaka Nakata

Perfume singles chronology
"Fushizen na Girl/Natural ni Koishite" (2010)	"Voice" (2010)	"Nee" (2010)

Music video
- "Voice" on YouTube

"Voice" (stylized as "VOICE") is the sixteenth overall single of electropop girl group Perfume. It was released on August 11, 2010 as a CD-only version and CD+DVD version. "Voice" was used in the commercial of "Nissan no Omise de!" Campaign and the B-side "575" was used in the Light Pool phone commercial by KDDI iida.

== Track listing ==
All lyrics are written by Yasutaka Nakata; all music is composed by Yasutaka Nakata.

CD
No.	Title	Length
1.	"Voice"	4:12
2.	"575"	4:27
3.	"Voice (Original Instrumental)"	4:12
4.	"575 (Original instrumental)"	4:25

DVD
No.	Title	Length
1.	"Voice (Video Clip)"	4:30

== Oricon Charts (Japan) ==
Weekly chart performance for "Voice"
Release	Oricon Singles Chart	Peak position	Sales (copies)
August 11, 2010	Daily Chart	2	40,281
August 11, 2010	Weekly Chart	2	84,911
August 11, 2010	Monthly Chart	8	106,992
August 11, 2010	Yearly Chart (2010)	53	120,704

Annual chart rankings for "Voice"
Chart (2010)	Rank
Japan Adult Contemporary (Billboard)	85

== Certifications ==
Region	Certification	Certified units/sales
Japan (RIAJ) Physical single	Gold	100,000^{^}
Japan (RIAJ) Full-length ringtone	Gold	100,000^{*}
^{*} Sales figures based on certification alone.^{^} Shipments figures based on certification alone.
