= Anri Sakaguchi =

Japanese variety entertainer

- 坂口 杏里
- Born: 野沢 瑞恵 (Mizue Nozawa); March 3, 1991 (age 35); Setagaya, Tokyo, Japan
- Education: Shoto Kindergarten; Seijo Gakuen Primary School; Seijo Gakuen Junior High School and High School; Horikoshi High School
- Occupation: Entertainer
- Years active: 2008 -
- Height: 1.68 m (5 ft 6 in) (2009)
- Relatives: Ryoko Sakaguchi (mother); Tateo Ozaki (stepfather)

Anri Sakaguchi (坂口 杏里, Sakaguchi Anri; born March 3, 1991, in Setagaya, Tokyo, Japan) is a Japanese variety entertainer.

== Biography ==
Sakaguchi was born on March 3, 1991, in Tokyo. She graduated from Shōtō Kindergarten, Seijo Gakuen Primary School, Seijo Gakuen Junior High School and High School, and Horikoshi High School.

Sakaguchi's mother is actress Ryoko Sakaguchi, her father was formerly a real estate company executive, her stepfather is the professional golfer Tateo Ozaki. She has a brother that is two years older than her. Her parents divorced on 1994, and she grew up with her mother.

Sakaguchi was a fan of Morning Musume and joined the entertainment industry in 2008. Her first leading film role was in Honey Flappers in 2014.

At the end of March 2016, Sakaguchi left Avilla at her own request.

She became an adult video actress, releasing her first video in October 2016. Sakaguchi began stripping in June 2018, and began working as a hostess.

On June 8, 2022, she announced her marriage. But on August 15, she announced her divorce through Instagram, after lasting only two months.

== Filmography ==
=== Adult Video ===
Year	Title	Publisher	ID
2016	ANRI - What a day!"	MUTEKI	TEK085
2017	'The Entertainer ANRI by KING'	MOODYZ	MIDE406
2017	'The Entertainer ANRI by Tsu'	MOODYZ	MIDE417
2017	'Why not Deflower a Real Celebrity?'	MOODYZ	MIDE428
2017	Miss ANRI the Celebrity is a Soapland Girl	MOODYZ	MIDE438
2017	Celebrity Loud Hot rhythmic Giant Gangbang	MOODYZ	MIDE446

=== TV series ===
Year	Title	Network	Notes
2009	Ongaku Baka	TV Tokyo	
2009	Dancing Sanma Palace	NTV	
2010	Quiz! Hexagon II	Fuji TV	
2012	Cream Quiz Miracle 9	TV Asahi	
2012	London Hearts	TV Asahi	
	Akashiya TV	MBS	

=== Dramas ===
Year	Title	Role	Network	Notes
2015	Garo: Gold Storm Sho	Mina	TV Tokyo	Episode 3

=== Radio series ===
Year	Title	Network	Notes
2011	Gurabiya	Raibowtown FM	
2013	Recommen!	NCB	

=== Films ===
Year	Title	Role	Notes	Ref.
	Twilight File V Famille: French Pan to Watashi			
2014	Honey Flappers	Mika Kirishima	Lead role	
