= Actor's School Hiroshima =

Performing arts school in Hiroshima, Japan

Coordinates: 34.3780958°N 132.4735026°E

- アクターズスクール広島
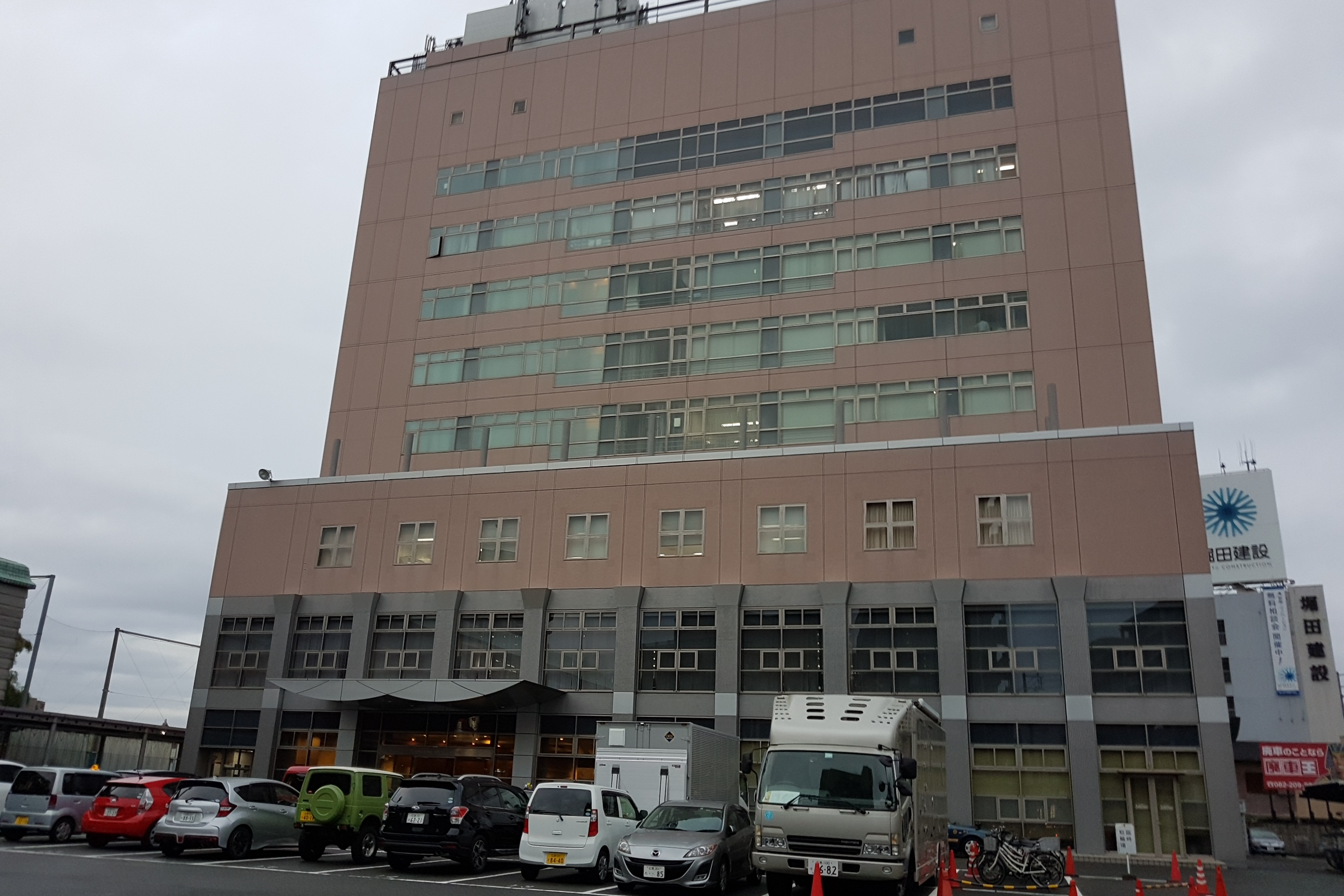
- TSS TV Head Office

Location
- 3rd Floor, TSS Headquarters, 2-3-18 Deshio, Minami-Ku, Hiroshima, 734-0001, Japan

Information
- School type: Private performing arts school
- Founded: 1999
- Website: http://www.tss-tv.co.jp/actors/

Actor's School Hiroshima (アクターズスクール広島, Akutāzusukūru Hiroshima), commonly abbreviated to ASH, is a performing arts school in Hiroshima, Japan, founded in 1999. It is managed by the production company TSS Production, a subsidiary of Shinhiroshima Telecasting, and is located within TSS Production offices. It has a longstanding business relationship with the talent agency Amuse, Inc. In October 2017, ASH opened a branch school near Fukuyama Station in Fukuyama, the second-largest city in Hiroshima Prefecture.

== Activities ==
Classes offered at Actor's School Hiroshima include acting, singing, dancing, and modelling.

ASH maintains several internal idol groups, the membership of which consists of active students who perform both in internal and outside events, allowing them to obtain real-world experience. These have included include SPL∞ASH, MAX♡GIRLS, peony (Shimane Prefecture promotional unit, named after that prefecture's official flower), and Kakumei Shojo (革命少女; "Revolution Girls").

ASH holds recitals, or "Acts", twice a year in the spring and autumn. The audience is allowed to record the performances using professional equipment. Students may perform solo or in groups after passing auditions, and the internal idol groups also perform there, often groups where a former ASH student is present.

=== Alumni relations ===
In March 2019, to commemorate the school's 20th anniversary, ASH students performed a medley of songs released by their notable alumni in that year's Spring Act.

In June 2019, former Morning Musume member Riho Sayashi—who had been out of the public eye for over three years—became a temporary backing dancer for the kawaii metal band Babymetal, appearing with them at Yokohama Arena and the UK's Glastonbury Festival. This was a shocking occurrence in the Japanese entertainment industry due to Sayashi's prominent position in Morning Musume, which is signed to a different agency to Babymetal, and because Sayashi and Babymetal lead singer Suzuka Nakamoto were considered two of the top students and rivals during their time at ASH. Their history is believed to be an influence on the decision.

On December 1, 2020, Arisa Mineyoshi of STU48 covered "Ijime, Dame, Zettai" by Babymetal in the final rounds of the AKB48 Group No. 1 Singer Contest.

On February 2, 2021, Nikkan SPA! reported on a series of concerts at the Nippon Budokan by three different musical acts fronted by ASH graduates, which it dubbed the "Budokan ASH Relay". It started with STU48, which performed there on January 15 and announced that Chiho Ishida would be the lead performer in their sixth single. Mitsuki Imamura, the group's captain, tweeted after the show "We left the baton at the Budokan", and =Love leader Anna Yamamoto tweeted "We received the baton" before her group performed there the next day. Babymetal would also perform in Budokan on the 19th and 20th, the first two shows in a planned ten-day performance.

On September 20, 2021, STU48 announced the "New Wave Project", an STU48 trainee recruitment process exclusively for active ASH students, at the 2021 ASH Autumn Act.

== Notable faculty ==
- Mikiko

== Notable alumni ==
- Perfume
  - Yuka Kashino (1st class)
  - Ayano Omoto (1st class)
  - Ayaka Nishiwaki (1st class)
  - Yuka Kawashima (former member) (1st class)
- Riho Sayashi, solo singer, former member of Morning Musume, former support dancer of Babymetal (12th class)
- Mariri Sugimoto, model, former member of Sakura Gakuin (12th class)
- Suzuka Nakamoto, former member of Karen Girl's and Sakura Gakuin, member of Babymetal (15th class)
- Himeka Nakamoto, former first generation member of Nogizaka46 (16th class)
- Anna Yamamoto, member of =Love
- Anna Murashige, former member of HKT48
- Yuri Tani, former member of AKB48 Team 8
- Hinano Okumoto and Hinako Okuhara, former members of AKB48 Team 8
- Hazuki Tanda, member of PALET
- STU48
  - 1st Generation: Mitsuki Imamura, Chiho Ishida, Marina Otani, Arisa Mineyoshi, Akari Yura (all former)
  - 2nd Generation: Sara Shimizu (former), Yuna Kawamata, Yura Ikeda
  - New Wave Project: Azumi Okada, Rio Okamura, Yuka Kurushima, Noa Morokuzu (a.k.a. Noa Mitsuki)
- Ruru Dambara, member of Juice=Juice (19th class)
- Aina Yoshida, former member of Pink Babies
- Mizuki Nakamoto, performed the Japanese end credits version of Frozen II theme, "Into The Unknown"
- Miko Todaka, member of Sakura Gakuin
- Ruli Hiromoto, member of Ocha Norma (31st class)
- Airi Taniguchi, member of Sakurazaka46
- Ayana Kuwahara, former member of RIRYDAY and contestant on World Scout: The Final Piece
- Aiko Sumida
