= Aiko Sumida =

Japanese singer

Aico or Aiko Sumida (住田愛子, Sumida Aiko; born September 21, 2007 in Yamaguchi Prefecture) is a Japanese singer who has been particularly successful in Korea through appearances on musical variety shows.

== Career ==
Sumida studied at Actor's School Hiroshima and was a member of the school's local idol group Splash, cheering idols for the Sanfrecce Hiroshima football team. Having made it through to the finals of the 2023 survival audition competition Trot Girls Japan, she went on to perform in the MBN singing competition Korea-Japan King of Singers (April–May 2024). Her episode 2 performance of Gingiragin ni sarigenaku (a 1981 hit for Masahiko Kondō) was viewed 2.8 million times within two weeks of being uploaded to the MBN YouTube Channel, with over 14 million views by August 2026.

In 2024, Sumida formed a Korean-Japanese trot duo with Kim Da-hyun, performing as Lucky PangPang (Lucky팡팡). The pair brought out two singles, "DAMDADI" (released 29 June 2024) and "Sugar" (released 8 October 2024).

Aico made her live debut as the lead singer of the girl band Oval Sistem on April 12, 2025, at the JigoRock 2025 open-air festival.
