= Yoshida & Co., Ltd. =

Luggage brand

- Native name: 吉田カバン株式会社
- Type: KK
- Industry: Bags, fashion accessories
- Founded: April 1, 1935
- Founder: Kichizo Yoshida
- Headquarters: Chiyoda, Tokyo, Japan
- Key people: Yukihiro Yoshida, CEO
- Revenue: US$152 million (2003)
- Divisions: PORTER; LUGGAGE LABEL; PORTER Girl
- Website: yoshidakaban.com

Yoshida & Co., Ltd. is a Japanese manufacturer based in Tokyo that designs and produces bags and accessories. Founded by Kichizo Yoshida in 1935, the company is best known for its PORTER and LUGGAGE LABEL brands of products.

== Popularity ==
Producing "Japan Made" products, Yoshida & Co. gained popularity among young people in the 1980s for its low-key wallets, bags and backpacks. The company's most popular brand, PORTER, often collaborates with other fashion brands and consumer electronics companies to produce limited-edition products, examples of which have included cases and bags for Sony PSP, VAIO, and Apple PowerBook, and iPod products.

== Operation ==
Yoshida & Co. distributes its products online and through over 700 stores worldwide, including three official company shops named Kura Chicka Yoshida located in Tokyo and Osaka, as well as in 28 Kura Chika partnership stores located domestically in Japan, and internationally in Hong Kong, Macau, and Taiwan.

== Brands ==
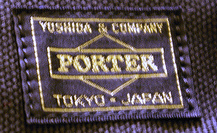
PORTER logo

Porter

Porter, branded in 1962, is the main brand of Yoshida & Co., Ltd. The name of the brand refers to a porter who carries luggage.

Luggage Label

Luggage Label was launched in 1984. This brand is oriented to adults.

Porter Girl

Porter Girl, released in 2009, was the first women's oriented brand by Yoshida & Co., Ltd. There are many unisex Porter branded products, but Porter Girl adopts more feminine designs and fabrics.

== Collaboration ==
The private brand, Head Porter, designed by Hiroshi Fujiwara selected Yoshida & Co., Ltd. as an OEM partner, and orders Yoshida & Co., Ltd. some of the branded products. The collaboration brand with Beams, Japanese fashion brand, is called B印YOSHIDA and produces that is collaborated with different category of businesses. For example, a plan case that is the collaboration with Masamichi Katayama, a Japanese architect, and a camera case that is the collaboration with Ichigo Sugawara, a Japanese photographer and so on.

Porter collaborated with Eric Clapton and C.F. Martin & Company and produced a pouch that is an extra item for a limited guitar. A collaboration brand to support the artist Yusuke Yoshimura, which is named Yusuke Shimura Tokyo New York, was launched in 2006.

== See also ==
- Ortlieb Sportartikel
