= Fushizen na Girl/Natural ni Koishite =

2010 single by Perfume

"Fushizen na Girl" "Natural ni Koishite"

Single by Perfume

from the album JPN
- A-side: "Fushizen na Girl"; "Natural ni Koishite"
- Released: April 14, 2010
- Recorded: 2010
- Genre: Disco, electropop (Fushizen na Girl); Electropop, R&B(Natural ni Koishite)
- Length: 3:59 (Fushizen na Girl) 3:08 (Natural ni Koishite)
- Label: Tokuma Japan Communications
- Songwriter(s): Yasutaka Nakata
- Producer(s): Yasutaka Nakata

Perfume singles chronology
"One Room Disco" (2009)	"Fushizen na Girl" "Natural ni Koishite" (2010)	"VOICE" (2010)

Music videos
- "Fushizen na Girl" on YouTube
- "Natural ni Koishite" on YouTube

"Fushizen na Girl/Natural ni Koishite" (不自然なガール/ナチュラルに恋して, Fushizen na Gāru/Nachuraru ni Koishite) is Perfume's first 2010 single and tenth major single release. It was released on April 14, 2010, as a CD-only version and CD+DVD version. The single debuted at number one on the Oricon Charts on its first day. The single was notable for being Perfume's second double A-side after Baby Cruising Love/Macaroni. As such, two promotional music videos were shot. "Natural ni Koishite" was used in a tie-in promotion with Japanese clothing line Natural Beauty Basic. Music critic Haruo Chikada points out in his music column "考えるヒット"(Kangaeru Hitto Considering hits) the antonymy of the two titles and compares the sound of "Natural ni Koishite" to Scritti Politti.

== Music videos ==
"Fushizen na Girl", directed by Seki Kazuaki, is based on the single cover's artwork. The video features an elaborate dance performance with the members of Perfume in red dresses. For the first time, Perfume are joined by backup dancers wearing identical wigs and 3D glasses. The video is sparse, featuring only a black infinity cove with a white striped floor. The backup dancers create additional scenes and visuals by holding up two-tone colour squares.

"Natural ni Koishite", directed by Kodama Yuichi, features Perfume outside of a Natural Beauty Basic store singing and dancing to the music. The floor of the set is a moving sidewalk, which is used in the dance routines. Midway through, the girls retreat into the store, instantly emerging with arms full of shopping bags. At the end, they run off of the set and out into the parking lot of the movie studio that the video was being filmed at. The clothing for the video was provided by Natural Beauty Basic and was made available for sale on the website. Four shorter versions of the video were used as commercials: one for each member of Perfume, and one with all three walking down the sidewalk.

== Track listing ==
=== CD ===
1. "Fushizen na Girl" (不自然なガール; Artificial Girl) – 3:59
2. "Natural ni Koishite" (ナチュラルに恋して; Fall in Love Naturally) – 3:08
3. "Fushizen na Girl -Original Instrumental-" – 3:57
4. "Natural ni Koishite -Original Instrumental-" – 3:04

=== DVD ===
1. Fushizen na Girl -video clip-
2. Natural ni Koishite -video clip-

== Oricon Charts (Japan) ==
Release	Oricon Singles Chart	Peak position	Sales (copies)	Sales total (copies)
14 April 2010	Daily Chart	1	39,382	
14 April 2010	Weekly Chart	2	80,871	101,579
14 April 2010	Monthly Chart	4	96,961	
14 April 2010	Yearly Chart (2010)	62	107,254	

== Certifications ==
Region	Certification	Certified units/sales
Japan (RIAJ)	Gold	100,000^{^}
^{^} Shipments figures based on certification alone.
