= JPN (album) =

Studio album by Perfume
- Released: November 30, 2011 (Japan)
- Recorded: 2010–2011
- Genres: Techno-pop; pop; dance
- Length: 55:10
- Labels: Tokuma Japan Communications (Japan); Universal Music (Asia)
- Producer: Yasutaka Nakata

Perfume chronology
Triangle (2009)	JPN (2011)	Perfume Global Compilation "Love the World" (2012)

Singles from JPN
- 1. "Fushizen na Girl/Natural ni Koishite" Released: April 14, 2010; 2. "Voice" Released: August 11, 2010; 3. "Nee" Released: November 10, 2010; 4. "Laser Beam/Kasuka na Kaori" Released: May 18, 2011; 5. "Spice" Released: November 2, 2011

JPN is the third studio album (fourth overall) by Japanese girl group Perfume, released on November 30, 2011, by Tokuma Japan Communications, nearly two and a half years after their second studio album Triangle. The album sold a total of 268,414 after two weeks of release, making it the 24th best-selling album of 2011 according to Oricon.

JPN is the group's last release under Tokuma Japan Communications as the group moved to Universal Music Japan (as announced February 28, 2012) for their future releases. JPN was released worldwide on March 6, 2012, to over 50 countries via iTunes.

== Background ==
The album was announced on Perfume's official website on September 5, 2011, along with a dance contest, their nineteenth single "Spice" and their third nationwide arena tour "Perfume Third Tour: JPN" starting in January 2012. It was released in two different versions; as a CD-only version and in a limited edition CD+DVD featuring promotional videos and commercial spots.

The B-side track of "Nee" ("FAKE IT") was not included in this album but two years later in "Perfume Global Compilation "LOVE THE WORLD"" album.

== Composition ==
The album includes all of the group's past four singles: "Fushizen na Girl/Natural ni Koishite", "Voice", "Nee", and "Laser Beam/Kasuka na Kaori". It also includes the singles' corresponding B-side songs. The only song out of all the singles that did not make it to this album was "Fake it" from the single Nee.

The group's nineteenth single, "Spice", serves as the album's lead single. It was released on November 2, 2011. A remixed version of its B-side song, "Glitter", is also included in the album.

Five of the other tracks are brand-new songs, including "My Color", "Toki no Hari" (時の針), and "Have a Stroll".

"Fushizen na Girl" was slightly edited from the original single version for this album, however, it is uncredited.

== Commercial performance ==
The album debuted at number 1 in the Oricon Weekly Albums Chart with 227,000 copies sold on its first week of release, their highest debut week sales than their previous albums in their career to date. This also made them the second female Japanese group to achieve three consecutive number one albums, a feat first achieved twelve years ago by veteran pop group Speed. The album sold a total of 268,000 after two weeks of release, making it the 24th best-selling album of 2011.

In South Korea, the album debuted at number 39 in the Gaon Monthly International Albums, selling 358 copies.

== Track listing ==
All tracks are written by Yasutaka Nakata.

No.	Title	Length
1.	"The Opening" (instrumental)	1:12
2.	"Laser Beam" (album mix) (レーザービーム Rēzā Bīmu)	3:10
3.	"Glitter" (album mix)	5:41
4.	"Natural ni Koishite" (ナチュラルに恋して Fall in Love Naturally)	3:08
5.	"My Color"	5:04
6.	"Toki no Hari" (時の針 Hand of Time)	2:30
7.	"Nee" (ねぇ Hey)	4:27
8.	"Kasuka na Kaori" (微かなカオリ Faint Fragrance)	4:49
9.	"575"	4:27
10.	"Voice"	4:13
11.	"Kokoro no Sports" (心のスポーツ Sports of the Heart)	4:08
12.	"Have a Stroll"	4:36
13.	"Fushizen na Girl (Note: Album edit)" (不自然なガール Artificial Girl)	3:59
14.	"Spice" (スパイス)	3:53
Total length:		55:10

Limited edition bonus DVD
No.	Title	Length
1.	"Spice" (music video)
2.	"Natural ni Koishite" (music video)
3.	"Laser Beam" (music video full)
4.	"Kasuka na Kaori" (music video)
5.	"Kasuka na Kaori" (music video TV edit)
6.	"Fushizen na Girl/Natural ni Koshite" (TV spot)
7.	"Voice" (TV spot)
8.	"Nee" (TV spot)
9.	"Laser Beam" (TV spot)
10.	"Spice" (TV spot)

== Chart positions ==
=== Oricon charts ===
Release	Chart	Peak position
November 30, 2011	Oricon Daily Charts	1
November 30, 2011	Oricon Weekly Charts	1
November 30, 2011	Oricon Monthly Charts	2
November 30, 2011	Oricon Yearly Charts	24

=== Other charts ===
Chart	Peak position
South Korea (Gaon Monthly International Albums)	39
Taiwan (G-Music J-Pop Chart)	10
World Albums Top 40	4

== Certifications ==
Region	Certification	Certified units/sales
Japan (RIAJ)	Platinum	250,000^{^}
^{^} Shipments figures based on certification alone.

== Accolades ==
- Spin's 20 Best Pop Albums of 2011 - ranked 14th

== Release history ==
Region	Date	Label	Format
Japan	November 30, 2011	Tokuma Japan Communications	CD, CD+DVD, Digital download
Worldwide	March 6, 2012	Tokuma Japan Communications	Digital download
Hong Kong	April 16, 2012	Universal Music Group	CD, CD+DVD, Digital download
South Korea	May 8, 2012	Universal Music Group	CD
Taiwan	April 13, 2012	Universal Music Group	CD
