= Ayaka Nishiwaki =

Japanese musician and dancer (born 1989)

- 西脇 綾香
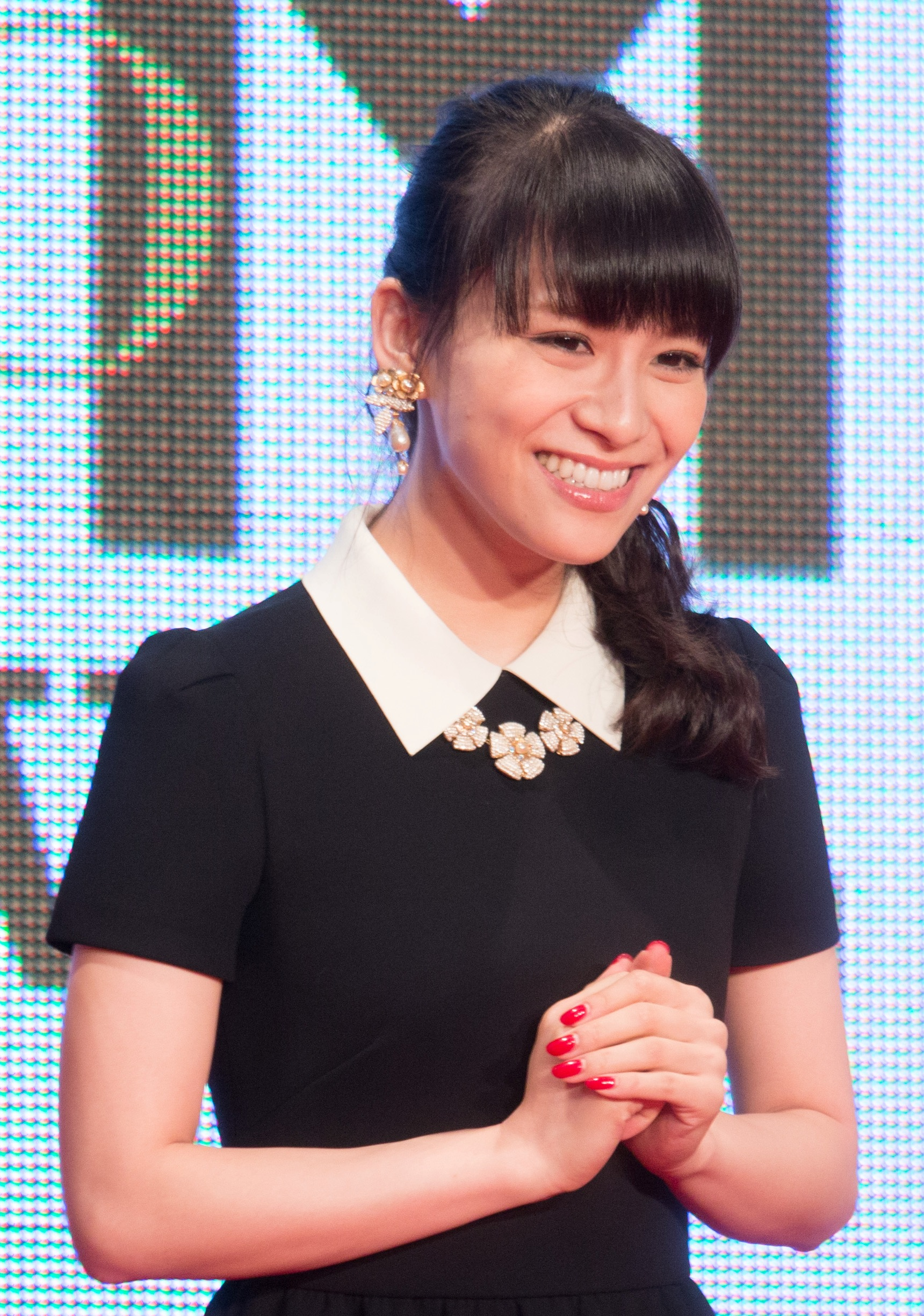
- Nishiwaki at the 28th Tokyo International Film Festival (2015)
- Born: 15 February 1989 (age 37); Hiroshima, Japan
- Other name: Ayaka Yoshida (吉田 綾香)
- Occupations: Musician; dancer
- Spouse: Yukihiro Yoshida (m. 2025)
- Musical career
- Genres: J-pop; Electropop
- Instrument: Vocals
- Years active: 2000–present
- Label: Universal J
- Member of: Perfume
- Website: Perfume Official Website

Ayaka Nishiwaki (西脇 綾香(にしわき あやか), Nishiwaki Ayaka; born 15 February 1989), nicknamed A~chan (あ～ちゃん; stylized as a-chan), is a Japanese musician and dancer. She is one of the members of the Japanese electropop group Perfume.

== Career ==
Nishiwaki was born and raised in Hiroshima, Japan, where she attended Actor's School Hiroshima with friends and current Perfume members Yuka Kashino and Ayano Ōmoto.

She formed Perfume in 2000 with Kashino and former member Yuka Kawashima, who left shortly after to focus on her schoolwork. After discussing the issue with her mother, who believed that a three-piece group had more stage presence than a duo, Nishiwaki asked Ōmoto to join the group.

Her younger sister Sayaka is a member of the group 9nine.

In March 2011, Nishiwaki graduated from Asia University with a degree in economics.

== Personal life ==
In November 2025, Nishiwaki announced through her official social media account that she had married a non-celebrity man. It was later revealed that he is Yukihiro Yoshida, the president of Yoshida & Co., Ltd.. Fellow Perfume members Kashino and Ōmoto served as witnesses to their marriage registration. In September 2026, Nishiwaki held a wedding ceremony at Lake Como, Italy.

== Solo works ==
On 18 April 2008, Perfume made a special guest appearance performing "Ceramic Girl" at the ending of the drama Sumire 16 sai!!.

On 23 March 2012, Perfume made a special guest appearance performing "Baby Cruising Love" in the movie Moteki.

In 2014, Nishiwaki co-wrote the song "Sore o Tsuyosa to Yobitai" (それを強さと呼びたい; "I Want to Call That Strength") with Haruichi Shindo. It was used as the theme of the Amuse Fes 2014 BB in Tsumagoi, and was performed by 13 artists: Perfume, Porno Graffitti, Flumpool, Begin, Skoop On Somebody, Yu Takahashi, Weaver, Mihiro, Monobright, Rihwa, Haku, Sakura Fujiwara, and Cross Gene.

In April 2014 and March 2016, Nishiwaki presented the radio program "A 〜-chan no tadatada rajio ga suki ja ke n" (あ〜ちゃんのただただラジオがスキじゃけん, "A-chan's I Just Simply Love Radios") on the four JFN stations in Shikoku.

On 20 June 2016, the radio program "A ~ chanchā pon no! " West Side Story"" (あ～ちゃん ちゃあぽんの！"West Side Story", "A – chan, Cha – pons'! "West Side Story""), hosted by the Nishiwaki sisters, debuted on JFN Park.

On 18 January 2017, Nishiwaki played the voice of an imaginative creature named Reba in the NTV drama Tokyo Tarareba Girls.

On 31 March and 1 April 2017, she played the role of Don-chan in the TV Tokyo special drama Pensées.

In September 2017, she dubbed the voice of the rescue squad in the Fastening Days 3 mini-series.

In January 2020, Nishiwaki was appointed as the studio MC for I Want to Fall in Love With a Romantic Drama: Bang Ban Love on Abema Special. The first episode was broadcast at 11:00 p.m. on 25 January.

In September 2020, she was the studio MC for I Want to Fall in Love With a Romantic Drama: Kiss on the Bed on Abema Special. The first episode was broadcast at 11:00 p.m. on 26 September.

In October 2020, Nishiwaki reprised her role as the voice of Reba in the special drama Tokyo Tarareba Girls 2020.

In May 2021, she was the studio MC for I Want to Fall in Love With a Romantic Drama: Kiss or Kiss on Abema Special. The first episode was broadcast at 11:00 p.m. on 1 May.

In October 2021, she was the studio MC for I Want to Fall in Love With a Romantic Drama: Kissing the Tears Away on Abema Special. The first episode was broadcast at 10:00 p.m. on 31 October.

In May 2022, Nishiwaki was the studio MC for I Want to Fall in Love With a Romantic Drama: Kiss Me Like a princess on Abema Special. The first episode was broadcast at 10:00 p.m. on 15 May.

In November 2022, she was the studio MC for I Want to Fall in Love With a Romantic Drama in New York on Abema Special. The first episode was broadcast at 10:00 p.m. on 13 November.
