= Ayano Ōmoto =

Japanese singer and dancer (born 1988)

- 大本 彩乃
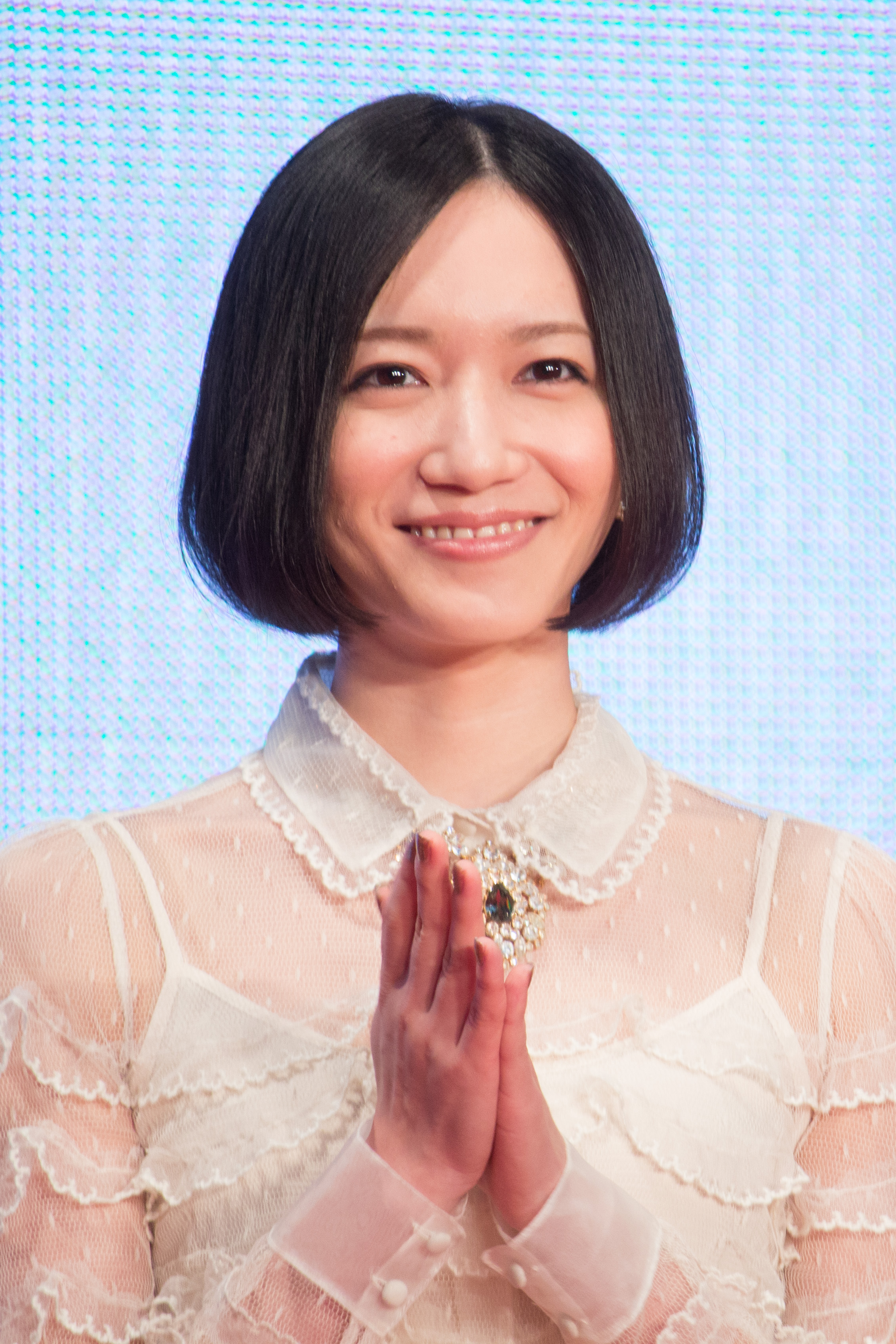
- Born: 20 September 1988 (age 38); Fukuyama, Hiroshima, Japan
- Other name: Nocchi
- Occupations: Singer; dancer
- Spouse: Kento Shibuya
- Musical career
- Genres: J-Pop; electropop
- Years active: 2000–present
- Label: Universal J
- Member of: Perfume
- Website: www.perfume-web.jp

Ayano Ōmoto (大本 彩乃, Ōmoto Ayano; born 20 September 1988), nicknamed Nocchi (のっち, stylized as NOCCHi), is a Japanese singer and dancer. She is known as one of the members of the Japanese electropop group Perfume.

== Biography ==
Ōmoto was born and raised in Fukuyama City, Hiroshima Prefecture, and attended Actor's School Hiroshima with friends and Perfume members Ayaka Nishiwaki and Yuka Kashino where she was placed in the advanced class for singing. In a letter she wrote to her "Future Me" she recalled her singing teacher telling her she just wanted to sing and dance because she loved it. Nishiwaki and Kashino were still in the beginner class at this time, meeting Ōmoto secretly.

Before she became a member of Perfume, Nocchi was part of other idol groups such as "Happy Baby" (ハッピーベイビー, Happībeibī) and "La Ayanota" (ラ･アヤノータ, Ra ayanōta). She joined Perfume in the summer of 2000, replacing the original third member Yuka Kawashima, who left the group to focus on her schoolwork.

In 2002, she appeared in an advertisement for Johnson & Johnson.

Ōmoto graduated from Horikoshi High School. In April 2007, she enrolled into J. F. Oberlin University together with fellow Perfume member Yuka Kashino. However, while Kashino graduated in March 2011, Ōmoto dropped out by 2008.

On 18 April 2008, Perfume made a special guest appearance performing "Ceramic Girl" at the ending of drama Sumire 16 sai!!.

On 23 March 2012, Perfume made a special guest appearance performing "Baby Cruising Love" in the movie Moteki.

On 31 March and 1 April 2017, Ōmoto played the character Noribu in the TV Tokyo special drama Pensées.

In September 2017, Ōmoto dubbed the voice of the mail delivery person in the Fastening Days 3 mini-series.

Ōmoto's regular page "NOCCHi wants to play games!" on the Japanese music news site Ongaku Natalie was first released on January 1, 2020.

On 27 May 2024 Ōmoto duetted with Ringo Sheena on the single "1RKO", featured on the album Carnival.

== Appearances ==
=== TV programs ===
- "Kandada's Labyrinth" in the back of the multi-tenant building (NHK, August 6, 2019)
- I want to play a game! Matsulie special edition "Nocchi wants to play a sound game!" (Matsulie, January 30, 2021 12:00 to January 31, 2021 23:59)

==== Still model ====
- Facial Cleansing Foam "Clean & Clear" (Johnson & Johnson, 2002 ) – Graphic Advertising Model

=== Digitally distributed content ===
- Amuse Fes in MAKUHARI 2017 - rediscover - Purchasing Department (Amuse Inc., June 4, 2017) – Fujiwara Sakura guest appearance

=== Writing activity ===
==== Web serialization ====
- "I want to play a game!" (January 1, 2020-serialized, Ongaku Natalie, irregular serialization) – Comment contribution

==== Book ====
- "Sakura Gakuin 10th Anniversary" Thank you ... "" (February 14, 2021 Limited-time production, amuse, special message contribution)
- "Nocchi Wants to Play Games!" (December 6, 2024 Compilation, interview and other extras)

==== Magazine ====
- Tokyo Walker 2014 No.14 (July 15, 2014, BOOK interview)
- WITH July 2017 issue (May 27, 2017, comment contribution)

==== Web ====
- Akai Koen 3rd Album "Jyunjo Randoseru " (March 1, 2016, message contribution)
- Queen Bee 5th Full Album "Q " (April 14, 2017, message contribution)
- La La Larks 1st Full Album "Culture Vulture" (August 30, 2017, message contribution)
