= Yuka Kashino =

Japanese singer and dancer

- 樫野 有香
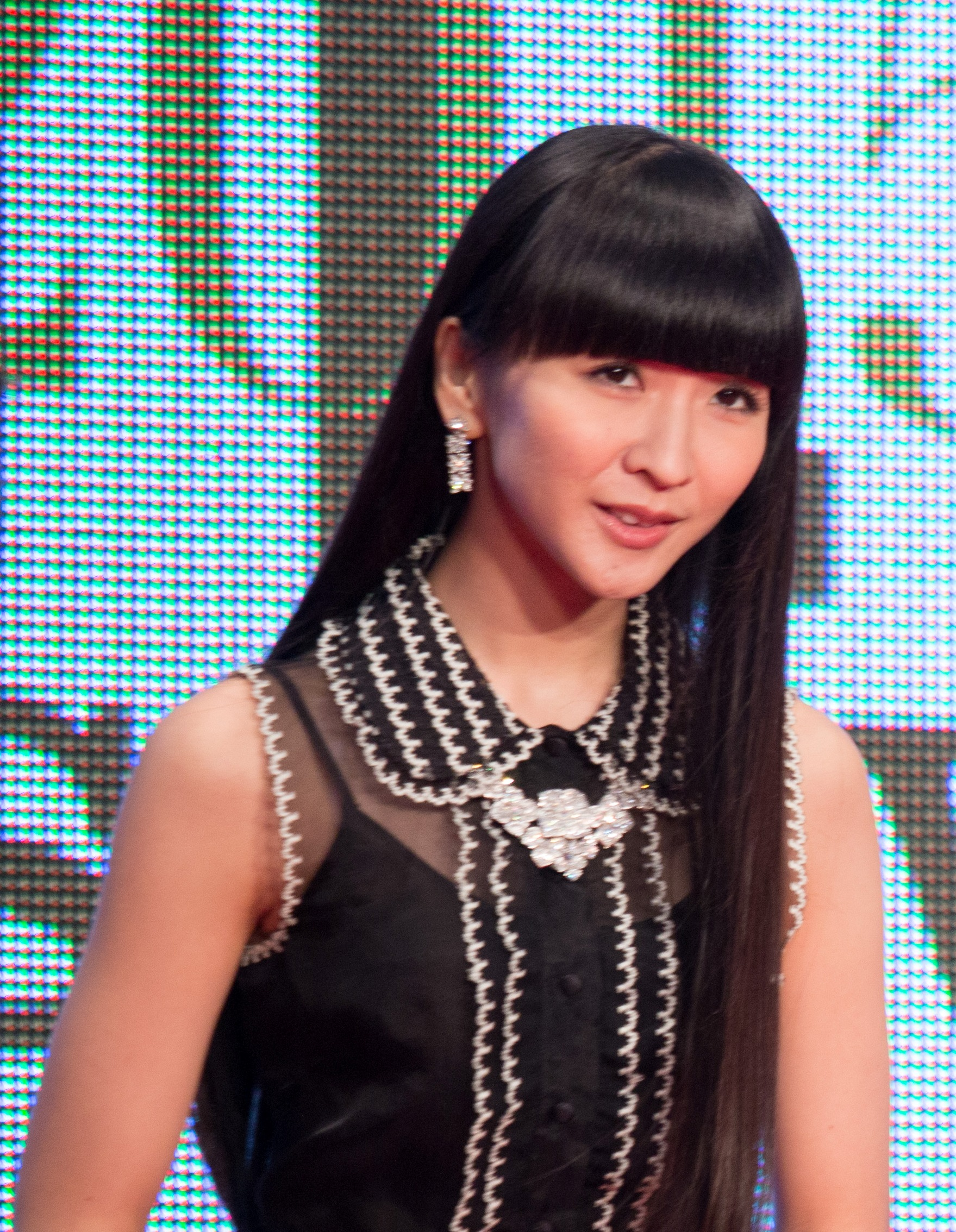
- Kashino at the 28th Tokyo International Film Festival (2015)
- Born: 23 December 1988 (age 37); Hiroshima, Japan
- Other name: Kashiyuka / Yuka-chan
- Occupations: Singer; dancer
- Musical career
- Genres: J-pop; electropop
- Years active: 2000–present
- Label: Universal J
- Member of: Perfume
- Website: www.perfume-web.jp

Yuka Kashino (樫野 有香, Kashino Yuka; born 23 December 1988), nicknamed Kashiyuka (かしゆか; stylized as KASHIYUKA), is a Japanese singer and dancer. She is known as one of the members of the electropop group Perfume.

== Biography ==
Kashino was born and raised in Hiroshima, Japan, where she attended Actor's School Hiroshima with friends and current Perfume members Ayaka Nishiwaki and Ayano Ōmoto. She and Nishiwaki are the two original members of Perfume.

Kashino and Nishiwaki formed Perfume in 2000 with former member Yūka Kawashima, who left shortly after to focus on her schoolwork. Before Ōmoto joined Perfume after being asked by Nishiwaki, the two had not met.

Kashino graduated from Horikoshi High School. She subsequently enrolled into J. F. Oberlin University, as the member's master and graduated in March 2011. Ōmoto attended the same university, but dropped out by 2008.

Kashino is also friends with fellow singer Kyary Pamyu Pamyu.

On 18 April 2008, Perfume made a special guest appearance performing "Ceramic Girl" at the ending of the drama Sumire 16 sai!!.

On 23 March 2012, Perfume made a special guest appearance performing "Baby Cruising Love" in the movie Moteki.

On 31 March and 1 April 2017, Kashino played the role of Okamido in the TV Tokyo special drama Pensées.

In September 2017, Kashino dubbed the voice of the cake shop clerk in the Fastening Days 3 mini-series.

Kashino's regular page "Kokontozai: Kashiyuka's Shop of Japanese Arts and Crafts" in the monthly magazine Casa Brutus started with issue 217, which was released on 9 March 2018.

In August 2024 Kashiyuka collaborated with the project "Shape of Tendo" by Tendo Mokko. She created "Rattan Side Table Limited Edition by Kashiyuka".

KASHIYUKA has been selected as the Wednesday partner for Nippon Television's "news zero" for three months starting in January 2025.

A special mook book summarizing the store's history over the past seven years, "Casa BRUTUS Special Edition: Kokontozai KASHIYUKA Shoten," will be released in bookstores nationwide from Wednesday, 12 March 2025. To commemorate the release of the book, we will be holding a pop-up store called "KASHIYUKA Shoten Real Store" at Nakagawa Masashichi Shoten in four cities across Japan: Tokyo, Nara, Hiroshima, and Fukuoka, from Wednesday, March 12, 2025.
