= Rewind Best =

Rewind Best-1 (2012→2006)

Greatest hits album by Capsule
- Released: March 6, 2013
- Recorded: 2006–2012
- Genre: Electronic
- Label: Yamaha Music Communications
- Producer: Yasutaka Nakata

Capsule chronology
Stereo Worxxx (2012)	Rewind Best-1 (2012→2006) (2013)	Caps Lock (2013)

Rewind Best-2 (2005→2001)

Greatest hits album by Capsule
- Released: 2012
- Recorded: 2001–2005
- Genre: Electronic
- Length: 71:00:00
- Label: Yamaha Music Communications
- Producer: Yasutaka Nakata

Capsule chronology
Stereo Worxxx (2011)	Rewind Best-2 (2005→2001) (2012)	Caps Lock (2013)

Rewind Best (stylized as rewind BEST) is a series of two greatest hits albums by the Japanese electronica band Capsule, simultaneously released on March 6, 2013. The releases contain fifteen songs each. The first album, Rewind Best-1 (2012→2006), spans music from their seventh album Fruits Clipper (2006) to their thirteenth album Stereo Worxxx (2012). The second album, Rewind Best-2 (2005→2001), contains music from Capsule's first album High Collar Girl (2001) to their sixth, L.D.K. Lounge Designers Killer (2005).

Rewind Best-1 (2012→2006) debuted at number twenty-two on the Oricon Albums Chart while Rewind Best-2 (2005→2001) debuted at number twenty-seven. Both albums fell out of the top fifty in their second week, and were on the chart for a total of five weeks.

These albums were the duo's last releases with Contemode and its parent company Yamaha Music Communications following their transfer to Warner Music Japan.

== Track listing ==
All tracks are written by Yasutaka Nakata

Rewind Best-1 (2012→2006)
No.	Title	Length
1.	"Step on the Floor" (from Stereo Worxxx, 2011)	5:14
2.	"World of Fantasy" (from World of Fantasy, 2010)	6:14
3.	"Striker" (from World of Fantasy, 2010)	5:55
4.	"Stay with You" (from Player, 2009)	5:23
5.	"I Wish You" (from Player, 2009)	4:03
6.	"Love or Lies" (from Player, 2009)	5:20
7.	"Hello" (from Player, 2009)	1:42
8.	"More More More" (from More! More! More!, 2008)	4:13
9.	"Jumper" (from More! More! More!, 2008)	6:57
10.	"Flash Back" (from Flash Back, 2007)	4:40
11.	"Eternity" (from Flash Back, 2007)	4:07
12.	"I'm Feeling You" (from Flash Back, 2007)	5:05
13.	"Starry Sky" (from Sugarless Girl, 2007)	5:40
14.	"Sugarless Girl" (from Sugarless Girl, 2007)	4:11
15.	"Jelly (album-edit)" (from Fruits Clipper, 2006)	5:07
Total length:		1:13:57

Rewind Best-2 (2005→2001)
No.	Title	Length
1.	"Soratobu Toshikeikaku" (空飛ぶ都市計画 Flying City Plan) (from L.D.K. Lounge Designers Killer, 2005)	5:07
2.	"Guraidā" (グライダー Glider) (from L.D.K. Lounge Designers Killer, 2005)	4:11
3.	"Terepotēshon" (テレポテーション Teleportation) (from L.D.K. Lounge Designers Killer, 2005)	4:37
4.	"Jinrui no Shinpo to Chouwa" (人類の進歩と調和 Progress and Harmony of Humankind) (from L.D.K. Lounge Designers Killer, 2005)	3:55
5.	"Do Do Pi Do" (from L.D.K. Lounge Designers Killer, 2005)	4:44
6.	"Tokyo Smiling" (from Nexus-2060, 2005)	4:12
7.	"A.I. Automatic Infection" (from Nexus-2060, 2005)	3:13
8.	"World Fabrication" (from Nexus-2060, 2005)	4:45
9.	"Retoro Memorī" (レトロメモリー Retro Memory) (from S.F. Sound Furniture, 2004)	3:23
10.	"RGB" (from Phony Phonic, 2003)	3:35
11.	"Music Controller" (from Music Controller -Single-2002)	4:34
12.	"Koi no Hana" (恋ノ花 Flower of Love) (from High Collar Girl, 2001)	5:09
13.	"Aishiteru Aishitenai" (愛してる愛してない I Love You, I Love You Not) (from High Collar Girl, 2001)	4:39
14.	"Tokyo Kissa" (東京喫茶 Tokyo Teahouse) (from High Collar Girl, 2001)	4:50
15.	"Sakura" (さくら Cherry Blossoms) (from High Collar Girl, 2001)	4:33
Total length:		1:05:35

== Charts ==
=== Rewind Best-1 ===
Chart (2013)	Peak position
Oricon Album Chart	22

=== Rewind Best-2 ===
Chart (2013)	Peak position
Oricon Album Chart	27
