= Jelly (song) =

Single by Capsule

from the album Fruits Clipper
- Released: April 19, 2006 (Original); August 3, 2011 (Kyary cover)
- Recorded: 2006
- Genre: Electronica, electropop
- Length: 19:33
- Label: Contemode
- Songwriter: Yasutaka Nakata
- Producer: Yasutaka Nakata

Capsule singles chronology
"Aeropolis" (2005)	"Jelly" (2006)	"Starry Sky" (2006)

Kyary Pamyu Pamyu singles chronology
"PonPonPon" (2011)	"Jelly" (2011)	"Tsukematsukeru" (2011)

"Jelly" is the sixth analog single by Japanese electronica band Capsule. It was released on April 19, 2006, as a single for their seventh album Fruits Clipper. "Jelly" was first found as a bonus track on the album L.D.K. Lounge Designers Killer if purchased from iTunes. An album-mix of "Jelly" and "CrazEEE Skyhopper" were later added to Fruits Clipper, while "Seismic Charge" was available as a remixed bonus track if purchased from iTunes. The album edit of "Jelly" was also added to Capsule's 2013 greatest hits album Rewind Best-1 (2012→2006).

A remixed version of "Jelly" was featured on their album Capsule Rmx.

== Track listing ==
All tracks are written by Yasutaka Nakata.

Side A
No.	Title	Length
1.	"Jelly" (extended-mix)	7:37

Side B
No.	Title	Length
1.	"Seismic Charge"	5:42
2.	"CrazEEE Skyhopper"	6:15
Total length:		19:33

== Cover versions ==
In 2011, "Jelly" was covered by Kyary Pamyu Pamyu who is also produced by Yasutaka Nakata. Kyary's cover was released as a single for her debut EP Moshi Moshi Harajuku.
