= Caps Lock (album) =

CAPS LOCK

Studio album by Capsule
- Released: October 23, 2013 (Japan)
- Recorded: 2013
- Genres: IDM; electronica; ambient; experimental
- Length: 35:42
- Language: -
- Labels: Unborde; Warner Music Japan
- Producer: Yasutaka Nakata

Capsule chronology
Rewind Best (2013)	CAPS LOCK (2013)	WAVE RUNNER (2015)

Singles from Caps Lock
- 1. "Control" Released: October 16, 2013 (digital download)

Caps Lock (stylized in all caps) is the fourteenth studio album by the Japanese electronica band Capsule, released on October 23, 2013, by Warner Music Japan's sublabel Unborde as their first album release under the label. It was released digitally by iTunes on October 16, 2013. Caps Lock debuted at number seven and thirteen of the Oricon Daily and Weekly Albums Chart, respectively, with 11,805 copies sold in its first week of release.

== Background, production and promotion ==
Professional ratings
Review scores
Source	Rating
Pitchfork Media	(6.1/10)

In early 2013, the duo left Yamaha Music Communications, effectively shutting down the Contemode sublabel by releasing the best-of albums Rewind Best 1 & 2 in March as their last release from the label. On July 31, 2013, AsobiSystem (the duo's new management agency) and Warner Music Japan sublabel unBORDE joined forces by releasing a compilation album AsobiTunes, which had new and old songs from different Asobisystem and Unborde artists. Yasutaka Nakata had contributed four tracks to the compilation: a new song entitled "Rainbow", a remix of Rip Slyme's "Nettaiya", an extended mix of Kyary Pamyu Pamyu's "PonPonPon" and Meg's "Secret Adventure". On August 3, 2013, the duo announced that they had officially signed with Unborde. A new album was announced, with details disclosed on August 29, 2013, with a promotional photo, album title and release date. On September 10, 2013, the covers and track list for the album were revealed.

In an interview with Japan Times, the songwriter-producer Yasutaka Nakata said that he wanted to do something new with the group on their transfer from Yamaha to Warner. He also said that the extreme editing that he had done on Toshiko Koshijima's vocals indicated that he no longer wanted to perform songs live, as he always just wanted to make music rather than presenting what he had finished by performance in front of people. None of the songs in the album were used as tie-ins for products and services, giving the album almost zero promotion. Koshijima, on the other hand, did not participate in any interviews regarding the album.

The album was released digitally worldwide on October 16, 2013, a week before its Japanese release date, by iTunes and managed to reach number one in Hong Kong, Singapore and Taiwan and number two in both France and the United States.

"Space" was used as an intermission song for the Wave Runner tour in 2015 and was also used as part of the Appleseed Alpha original soundtrack. "Control" was used as an interpretative intermission number in Kyary Pamyu Pamyu's 5ive Years Monster tour in 2016.

== Track listing ==
All songs written and produced by Yasutaka Nakata. All tracks with * have vocals from Toshiko Koshijima.

=== Regular edition ===
CD
No.	Title	Length
1.	"Home"	2:17
2.	"Control" (*)	4:36
3.	"Delete"	6:31
4.	"12345678" (*)	6:08
5.	"Shift" (*)	3:50
6.	"ESC"	2:18
7.	"Space" (*)	4:42
8.	"Return"	5:16

=== Limited edition bonus disc ===
No.	Title	Length
1.	"Control" (extended mix)	6:18
2.	"Delete" (extended mix)	8:56
3.	"ESC" (extended mix)	3:39

=== iTunes / Apple Music-only bonus track ===
No.	Title	Length
9.	"12345678" (extended mix)	7:43

== Charts and certifications ==
=== Japanese charts ===
Chart	Peak position
Oricon Daily Albums	7
Oricon Weekly Albums	13
Oricon Monthly Albums	32

=== Sales and certifications ===
Chart	Amount
Oricon sales	16,279

== Release history ==
Country	Date	Format(s)	Label	Edition(s)
Worldwide	October 15, 2013	Digital download	Warner Music	
Japan	October 23, 2013	CD, Digital download	Warner Music	CD, 2CD
Taiwan	November 15, 2013	CD, Digital download	Warner Music	CD, 2CD
