= Kimino Mikata =

Single by Kyary Pamyu Pamyu

from the album Japamyu
- Released: April 11, 2018
- Recorded: 2018
- Genre: J-pop; new jack swing
- Length: 3:04
- Label: Unborde; Warner Japan
- Songwriter: Yasutaka Nakata
- Producer: Yasutaka Nakata

Kyary Pamyu Pamyu singles chronology
"Easta" (2017)	"Kimino Mikata" (2018)	"Kimi ga Iine Kuretara" (2019)

"Kimino Mikata" (きみのみかた; lit. "Your Friend") is a song released by Japanese singer Kyary Pamyu Pamyu, released digitally on April 11, 2018 by Warner Music Japan sublabel Unborde. This is the singer's first music release since "Harajuku Iyahoi" and "Easta" in 2017.

== Music video ==
The music video for the song was released on the same day, April 11, 2018. It was directed by longtime collaborator Tamukai Jun.

== Commercial performance ==
The song debuted in the Oricon Daily Digital Singles Chart at number eight, and later at number 18 of the Oricon Weekly Digital Singles chart with 4,055 downloads.

== Track listing ==
Digital download
No.	Title	Writer(s)	Length
1.	"Kimino Mikata" (きみのみかた Your Friend)	Yasutaka Nakata	3:04
Total length:			3:04

== Charts ==
Chart (2018)	Peak position
Weekly Digital Singles (Oricon)	18
