= Netsuai Hakkakuchū =

Promotional single by Ringo Sheena and Yasutaka Nakata

from the album Ukina
- Released: November 13, 2013
- Recorded: 2013
- Genre: Electropop, dubstep
- Length: 3:29
- Label: EMI Records Japan
- Songwriter: Ringo Sheena
- Producer: Yasutaka Nakata

"Netsuai Hakkakuchū" (熱愛発覚中; 'Detecting Love'), also known by its French title "J'ai trouvé l'amour" ('I Have Found Love') is a song by Japanese musician Ringo Sheena. It was her first collaboration with electronic producer and Capsule member Yasutaka Nakata, and was released as a single to promote her collaboration compilation album Ukina.

== Background and development ==
Ukina was a project released as a part of Ringo Sheena's 15th anniversary celebrations. It featured past collaborations with musicians released between 1998 and 2013. "Netsuai Hakkakuchū" was one of two unpublished songs, the other being "It Was You," a ballad written by American songwriter Burt Bacharach.

== Writing and production ==
The song was written entirely by Shiina, and was then given to Yasutaka Nakata to arrange. Nakata productions for artists such as Ami Suzuki, Perfume or Kyary Pamyu Pamyu generally feature Nakata writing lyrics and music as well. However, Nakata had worked as a co-writer in the past, on singer Meg's albums between 2007 and 2010.

== Promotion and release ==
On November 13, both "Netsuai Hakkakuchū" and "It Was You" were released on iTunes as digital singles. On November 15, Sheena performed "Netsuai Hakkakuchū" live at Music Station. Yasutaka-produced group Perfume also appeared on the episode. Sheena performed the song at her Tōtaikai series of concerts in November 2013, which later had a DVD release in March 2014.

== Music video ==
Sheena as Linnko about to attack paparazzi (played by Idevian Crew) in the music video.

A music video was produced for the song, which was directed by her partner Yuichi Kodama. A short version of the music video for "Netsuai Hakkakuchū" was uploaded in early November 2013, and reached 100,000 views in three days. The full version was released in full on November 13, 2013.

The music video features Sheena playing two characters: Rinnko (RINN子) and Linnko (LINN子), members of a fictional idol group called Rinrin (凜凜). Linnko wears a black leather mini-dress while she attacks the men. The video also features dance scenes with both Rinnko and Linnko, alongside dance crew Idevian Crew members Mineko Saito, Nagisa Sugao, Ai Kaneko and Tomoko Yoda. It was Sheena's first time attempting dance and action scenes.

The video begins with a shot of Rinnko in a colourful dress standing still, then falling to the ground. She is surrounded by paparazzi in suits in a concrete building. Linnko, wearing dark leather, bends down to look at Rinnko's body, and begins to move her arms in martial arts-like stances. She then attacks the paparazzi, knocking one into a pile of cardboard boxes and pushing one off of a ledge. The video shows a boss at a desk, angrily addressing more paparazzi. Linnko looks at a locket she's holding in her hand, featuring a picture of her with Rinnko. The video then shows Rinnko and Linnko dancing together with megaphones. Behind them are the kanji 凜凜, in blue and pink neon lights. Linnko makes her way to the boss, pinning him against a wall. She dodges an axe, and throws two round shuriken at her assailant. She strangles the paparazzi boss, and makes his office explode. The final shot depicts a Buddhist monk sitting in a traditional Japanese room, thinking.

== Charts ==
Chart (2013)	Peak position
Japan Billboard Adult Contemporary Airplay	2
Japan Billboard Japan Hot 100	6

== Release history ==
Region	Date	Format	Distributing Label
Japan	November 13, 2013	Digital download	EMI Records Japan
