= Pon Pon Pon =

Single by Kyary Pamyu Pamyu

from the album Moshi Moshi Harajuku and Pamyu Pamyu Revolution
- Released: July 20, 2011
- Recorded: May–July 2011
- Genre: J-pop; electropop; dance-pop
- Length: 4:02
- Label: Warner Music Japan
- Songwriter: Yasutaka Nakata
- Producer: Yasutaka Nakata

Kyary Pamyu Pamyu singles chronology
"Pon Pon Pon" (2011)	"Jelly" (2011)

"Pon Pon Pon" (stylized in all uppercase) is a song by Japanese singer Kyary Pamyu Pamyu. It was released as her debut single and as the lead single from her first extended play (EP), Moshi Moshi Harajuku, and was later included on her debut album, Pamyu Pamyu Revolution. The song was written and produced by Yasutaka Nakata of Capsule. The music video, a psychedelic tribute to Kawaii and Decora culture, was released to YouTube on July 16, 2011, and became a viral hit. On July 27, 2012, a limited edition of a 7' LP with Side A: PONPONPON -extended mix- and Side B: Cherry Bon Bon -extended mix- was released (and re-released on January 3, 2013) exclusively for DJs.

The song was launched on iTunes internationally in 23 countries, and set records for a Japanese song, reaching number one on the Finnish dance chart and number four on the Belgium dance chart. As of 2012, the song sold over 1 million digital downloads. As of 2024, the music video has over 200 million views on YouTube. Internationally, the song has been featured in G-Eazy's single "Lost in Translation", FACE's "Night Fever", and was featured in The Simpsons episode "Married to the Blob". "Pon Pon Pon" is featured on a 2012 Japan game, Just Dance Wii 2.

The Japan Times in 2019 listed "PonPonPon" among the most influential J-Pop songs of the 2010s decade, noting the music video's extravagant aesthetics and electronic production.

== Music video ==
=== Development ===
The music video for "PonPonPon" was shot by Jun Tamukai. The theme of the music video is "kawaii", which means 'cute' in Japanese. Tamukai regarded Kyary as a person bending the definition of "kawaii" by mixing it with weirdness. The art director of the music video, Sebastian Masuda, of fashion brand 6%DOKIDOKI, adopted the randomness of "a room of a girl who isn't good at tidying up", adding "a taste of the 60-70s". The fashion stylist and designer for the video was Kumiko Iijima.

Kawaisa and Decora culture are prevalent in the "PonPonPon" video.

=== Synopsis ===
The video is a mix of 2D and 3D animation. It depicts two worlds, the first of which was created by Masuda Sebastian and looks like a room of a girl; the other is her own mental world, where her face is pink-colored. The video starts with a microphone stand coming out of Kyary's ear. The microphone stand is used to imitate the image of Freddie Mercury.

In the chorus, Kyary performs a dance choreographed by air:man with the lyrics inserted as kinetic typography. When Kyary claps during the bridge, slices of bread appear because "pan" is the Japanese onomatopoeia for the sound of a clap, as well as the word for 'bread'.

A combo television unit into which a cassette is inserted is a reference to the fact that analog broadcasting stopped in Japan and was switched to digital broadcasting on July 20, the same day the song was released on the iTunes Store. Kyary parodies the "Hige dance" from the 1970s comedy show 8 Ji Dayo! Zen'in Shugo wearing a mustache and does the "kamehameha" move from the Japanese manga series Dragon Ball.

== Personnel ==
The cover artwork credits—adapted from liner notes.

- Steve Nakamura – art director, designer
- Shinji Konishi – hair, make-up
- Eri Soyama – stylist

== Charts ==
Chart (2011–2013)	Peak position
Japan Hot 100 (Billboard)	9
Japan Billboard Top Airplay	6
Japan Billboard Adult Contemporary Airplay	68
US World Digital Songs (Billboard)	15

== Certifications ==
Region	Certification	Certified units/sales
Japan (RIAJ)	Platinum	250,000^{*}
^{*} Sales figures based on certification alone.
