= Candy Racer =

Studio album by Kyary Pamyu Pamyu
- Released: October 27, 2021
- Recorded: 2019–2021
- Length: 47:05
- Label: Nippon Columbia; KRK Lab
- Producer: Yasutaka Nakata

Kyary Pamyu Pamyu chronology
Japamyu (2018)	Candy Racer (2021)

Singles from Candy Racer
- 1. "Kimi ga Iine Kuretara" Released: May 10, 2019; 2. "Kamaitachi" Released: April 24, 2020; 3. "Gum Gum Girl" Released: January 29, 2021; 4. "Gentenkaihi" Released: August 16, 2021

Professional ratings
Review scores
Source	Rating
Pitchfork	7.2/10

Candy Racer (Japanese: キャンディーレーサー Kyandii Reesaa) is the fifth studio album by Japanese singer Kyary Pamyu Pamyu, released on October 27, 2021, by Nippon Columbia and its imprint KRK Lab as her only album release on the label.

== Background ==
After completing promotion for her fourth studio album Japamyu in early 2019, Kyary Pamyu Pamyu's contract with Warner Music Japan expired, leaving her an independent artist. On May 10, 2019, she independently released the digital single "Kimi ga Iine Kuretara" through her agency Asobisystem's in-house label Asobimusic. It was used as a theme song to the Japanese drama series Mukai no Bazuru Kazoku. The single was later re-released on vinyl in February 2020. Kyary then performed her next single "Kamaitachi" on her birthday live with her music producer Yasutaka Nakata on January 29, 2020. The song was released as a digital single on April 24, 2020, during the lockdowns brought by the COVID-19 pandemic. Her planned national tour Kamaitachi Tour 2020 was canceled because of the pandemic. In early January 2021, Asobisystem announced that Kyary has signed a recording contract with Japanese record label Nippon Columbia and established her own imprint label KRK Lab as part of her tenth anniversary as a singer. She then released a new digital single "Gum Gum Girl" on January 29, 2021, her 28th birthday. On August 16, 2021, Kyary released a new digital single, "Genten Kaihi". On September 10, 2021, the album release was announced. "Jumping Up" was released as a single from the album on September 29, 2021, followed by "Dodonpa" on October 13, 2021, with an accompanying lyric video. The music video for the title track was released on November 2, 2021, on YouTube.

== Commercial performance ==
Candy Racer debuted at the twenty-second spot of the Oricon Weekly Albums Chart, selling 3,065 copies on its first week of release. It continued to chart for three more weeks, and in total sold 3,932 copies.

== Track listing ==
All songs written, arranged, and produced by Yasutaka Nakata.

No.	Title	Length
1.	"De. Ba. Ya. Shi. 2021"	1:13
2.	"Candy Racer" (キャンディーレーサー)	5:07
3.	"Dodonpa" (どどんぱ)	4:38
4.	"Kamaitachi" (かまいたち)	4:26
5.	"Gentenkaihi" (原点回避)	4:15
6.	"Kimi ga Iine Kuretara" (きみがいいねくれたら)	3:44
7.	"Gum Gum Girl" (ガムガムガール)	3:38
8.	"Perfect Oneisan" (パーフェクトおねいさん)	6:09
9.	"Jumping Up" (じゃんぴんなっぷ)	4:20
10.	"Natsuiro Flower" (夏色フラワー)	4:50
11.	"World Fabrication"	4:47
Total length:		47:05

== Charts ==
Chart performance for Candy Racer
Chart (2021)	Peak position
Japanese Albums (Oricon)	22
Japanese Hot Albums (Billboard Japan)	23

=== Sales ===
Chart	Amount
Oricon physical sales	3,932
