= Nebula Romance: Part I =

- Digital and regular edition cover

Studio album by Perfume
- Released: September 20, 2024 (digital); October 30, 2024 (physical)
- Recorded: 2023–2024
- Genre: J-pop; disco; synthwave
- Length: 35:25
- Label: Polydor; Perfume
- Producer: Yasutaka Nakata

Perfume chronology
Plasma (2022)	Nebula Romance: Part I (2024)	Nebula Romance: Part II (2025)

Singles from Nebula Romance: Part I
- 1. "Sumikko Disco" Released: November 3, 2023 (digital); 2. "The Light" Released: May 24, 2024 (digital)

Nebula Romance: Part I (Japanese: ネビュラロマンス 前篇, Hepburn: Nebyura Romansu Zenpen) is the eighth studio album and first concept album by Japanese music group Perfume. It was released digitally on September 20, 2024, and on physical formats on October 30, 2024, via Polydor Records and Perfume Records.

== Background and development ==
Nebula Romance commemorates Perfume's twentieth anniversary of their major debut on September 21, 2024, as well as the twenty-fifth anniversary of the beginning of activities as a group, which occurred at end of that year. It is the first installment of a two-part concept album, which has been described as "a soundtrack for an imaginary film set in space, with the three members portraying an epic drama in the cosmos". Several of the album tracks ("Cosmic Treat," "Starlight Dreams", "Mobius") reference space-related themes.

For the recording of Nebula Romance Part 1, Perfume adopted a significantly different approach to their usual recording process, marking a departure from previous methods. Traditionally, the members of Perfume would record their parts one at a time, with each member waiting for their turn to record their vocals. However, for this album, the recording process was restructured: instead of recording each song individually with one person at a time, the group shifted to a new system where each member recorded two songs at a time in a scheduled manner. This change allowed for a more streamlined process, with each member participating more actively in the recording sessions over a shorter period.

One of the most notable changes was that Yasutaka Nakata would be directly involved in the recording process, as this time he focused primarily on the music side. The recording of vocals was overseen by a director, who worked closely with the group, while Nakata remained focused on the overall sound and production of the album. This shift in responsibilities meant that the members were unaware of their vocal assignments until they received the completed album, unlike previous albums, where they would often have a clearer idea of their parts during the recording sessions.

During recording sessions, multiple takes were recorded–sometimes as many as five per phrase–allowing for a range of options to be chosen in post-production. This new method of recording created an element of anticipation for the members, as they were unsure which take would ultimately be selected for the final version of the song. The absence of Nakata’s immediate, hands-on feedback also contributed to a more exploratory recording process.

== Release ==
The entire album was made available for streaming and download on digital platforms on September 20, 2024, the day before their 20th anniversary. The physical formats of the album were released on October 30 on three different formats: regular edition, limited edition, and a fan-club exclusive "P.T.A." edition. The limited edition features a Blu-ray or DVD with radio content and other special features, while the fan-club version includes footage from Perfume's fan-club only tour "P.T.A. 15th & 10th Anniversary 'Perfume to Anata' Hall Tour 2023". Both limited editions included a Nebula Romance emblem badge as an enclosed gift.

== Promotion ==
The album was preceded by three songs: "Sumikko Disco", which was first released on digital platforms in November 2023; "The Light", which was premiered live during Perfume's Asia Tour in June 2024; and "Love Cloud", which was previously included as the b-side of their single "Moon" released in September 2024. A music video was filmed for the song "Cosmic Treat", which served as a trailer for the album’s movie concept.

"Sumikko Disco" was used as theme song for the Fanworks animated movie Sumikko Gurashi: Tsugihagi Kōjō no Fushigi na Ko, which premiered in November 2023. "Ima Ima Ima" was used as theme song of Perfume's immersive exhibit Perfume Disco-Graphy: 25 years of Traces and Miracles (25年の軌跡と奇跡, Nijūgo-nen no Kiseki to Kiseki) held at the Tokyo Node in Toranomon Hills, Tokyo. "Cosmic Treat" was used as ending theme for the television anime series Beyblade X which premiered in October 2024.

== Critical reception ==
Writing for Rockin'On Japan magazine, music journalist Sayako Oki gave a positive review on the album, commenting: "The album’s sound design intricately blends the vocals with a detailed portrayal of a futuristic space city, showcasing sophisticated techniques that transcend temporal trends. Notable elements include the extensive use of melody to complement the lyrics and a meticulous arrangement of music that emphasizes sonic depth and precision." She noted that given its nature as a two-part space-themed concept album, the album "allows for the vocals to shine with purity and brilliance, unimpeded by the instrumental intensity" and provides a "unique, immersive experience that is rare in music, offering a distinct alternative to visual media such as films or television dramas." Furthermore, she recognized that following their twentieth anniversary, "Perfume continues to take on challenges as a cohesive group, which exemplifies the true spirit of an 'adventure'".

In the November 2024 issue of Tower Records' Bounce magazine, music critic Takao Kito noted that despite being reminiscent of their earlier work, Nebula Romance: Part I introduce new trials and approaches which "create a sound that, while similar, is distinct from their previous works", providing “Cosmic Treat” and “Starlight Dreams” as examples which incorporate retro-futuristic elements. Kito commented that while Perfume distances themselves from current trends with this record, it still remains faithful to the art form that they have established, while also showcasing significant development.

== Track listing ==
All tracks are written by Yasutaka Nakata.

Nebula Romance: Part I - CD, digital release
No.	Title	Length
1.	"The Light"	3:34
2.	"Love Cloud" (ラヴ・クラウド)	3:39
3.	"Cosmic Treat"	3:07
4.	"Starlight Dreams"	3:33
5.	"Ima Ima Ima"	3:35
6.	"Sumikko Disco" (すみっコディスコ)	3:28
7.	"Morning Cruising"	3:07
8.	"Time Capsule" (タイムカプセル)	3:34
9.	"Jikūka" (時空花, Space-time Flower)	4:08
10.	"Mobius" (メビウス)	3:43
Total length:		35:25

Nebula Romance: Part I - Limited edition DVD/BD
No.	Title	Length
1.	"Perfume View"
2.	"Nebula Romance: Part I" (Teaser)
3.	"The Light" (Perfume "Cod3 of P3rfum3 ZOZ5" Asia Tour 2024)
4.	"Ima Ima Ima" (Perfume 25th & 20th Anniversary Live Performance "Ima Ima Ima" Powered by NTT)
5.	"Perfume no Tada Tada Radio ga Suki dakara Radio! Roku Zenpen" (Perfumeのただただラジオが好きだからレイディオ! 6 前篇)

P.T.A. 15th & 10th Anniversary “Perfume to Anata” Hall Tour 2023 - Fan Club Limited Edition BD/DVD
No.	Title	Length
1.	"Moon"
2.	"Dream Fighter"
3.	"Electro World" (エレクトロ・ワールド)
4.	"Ceramic Girl" (セラミックガール)
5.	"The Best Thing"
6.	"Dare mo Shiranai Medley (Note: Medley of Perfume's pre-debut songs "Super Jet Shoes" (スーパージェットシューズ), "Omajinai Perori" (OMAJINAI★ペロリ), and "Kareshi Boshūchū" (彼氏募集中).)" (だれも知らないメドレ～; Medley Nobody Knows of)
7.	"Perfect Star Perfect Style" (パーフェクトスター・パーフェクトスタイル)
8.	"Toumei Ningen" (透明人間)
9.	"Sweet Refrain"
10.	"Love Cloud" (ラヴ・クラウド)
11.	"P.T.A. Corner" (「P.T.A.」のコーナー)
12.	"Jenny wa Gokigen Naname" (ジェニーはご機嫌ななめ)
13.	"Fake It"
14.	"Seventh Heaven"
15.	"Kokoro no Sports" (心のスポーツ)
16.	"Wonder2"

== Tour ==
To promote the album, Perfume embarked on their domestic tour Perfume 10th Tour ZOZ5 "Nebula Romance" Episode 1, which began on December 28, 2024, in Kanagawa.

=== Tour dates ===
List of concerts, showing date, city, venue, and attendance
Date	City	Venue	Attendance
December 28, 2024	Kanagawa	Pia Arena MM	
December 29, 2024	Kanagawa	Pia Arena MM	
December 31, 2024	Kanagawa	Pia Arena MM	
January 18, 2025	Saga	Saga Arena	
January 19, 2025	Saga	Saga Arena	
January 25, 2025	Tokushima	Asty Tokushima	
January 26, 2025	Tokushima	Asty Tokushima	
February 15, 2025	Tokyo	Ariake Arena	
February 16, 2025	Tokyo	Ariake Arena	
February 22, 2025	Shizuoka	Ecopa Arena	
February 23, 2025	Shizuoka	Ecopa Arena	
March 4, 2025	Osaka	Osaka-jō Hall	
March 5, 2025	Osaka	Osaka-jō Hall	
March 15, 2025	Fukui	Sun Dome Fukui	
March 16, 2025	Fukui	Sun Dome Fukui	
March 22, 2025	Miyagi	Sekisui Heim Super Arena	
March 23, 2025	Miyagi	Sekisui Heim Super Arena	
March 29, 2025	Aichi	Port Messe Nagoya 1st Exhibition Hall	
March 30, 2025	Aichi	Port Messe Nagoya 1st Exhibition Hall	
April 12, 2025	Hokkaido	Makomanai Sekisui Heim Ice Arena	
April 13, 2025	Hokkaido	Makomanai Sekisui Heim Ice Arena	
April 19, 2025	Chiba	LaLa Arena Tokyo-Bay	
April 20, 2025	Chiba	LaLa Arena Tokyo-Bay	
Total			N/A

== Charts ==
=== Weekly charts ===
Weekly chart performance for Nebula Romance: Part I
Chart (2024)	Peak position
Japanese Albums (Oricon)	5
Japanese Combined Albums (Oricon)	5
Japanese Hot Albums (Billboard Japan)	5

=== Year-end charts ===
Year-end chart performance for Nebula Romance: Part I
Chart (2025)	Position
Japanese Download Albums (Billboard Japan)	72
