= Digital Native (album) =

Studio album by Yasutaka Nakata
- Released: February 7, 2018
- Genre: Future bass; EDM
- Language: Japanese; English
- Label: Unborde; Warner Music Japan
- Producer: Yasutaka Nakata (music, exec.)

Yasutaka Nakata chronology
Nanimono EP (2016)	Digital Native (2018)

Singles from Digital Native
- 1. "Nanimono" Released: October 5, 2016; 2. "Crazy Crazy" Released: January 18, 2017; 3. "Love Don't Lie" Released: August 9, 2017 (digital download); 4. "Give You More" Released: October 20, 2017 (digital download)

Digital Native is the debut studio album by Japanese electronica musician Yasutaka Nakata, released on February 7, 2018 by Warner Music Japan sublabel Unborde. The album features vocal contributions from session singer Rosii, British singer Charli XCX, Japanese rock singer-musician Yonezu Kenshi, Japanese model-singers Kyary Pamyu Pamyu and Momo Mashiro, and Japanese hip-hop duo chelmico's Mamiko, as well as additional music production from Japanese dubstep musician Banvox.

The album debuted at number 13 of the Oricon Weekly Albums chart, selling 4,742 copies on its first week of release. It also debuted at the top spot of the Oricon Weekly Digital Albums chart with 2,124 downloads.

== Background ==
Yasutaka Nakata has done activities with Japanese electronica duo Capsule since the band's debut in 2001. Management agency Asobisystem and record label Warner Music Japan announced that Nakata would make his solo debut with the release of the song "Nanimono" on October 5, 2016. The song featured vocals from rock singer-musician Yonezu Kenshi. By December, Warner has announced that Nakata would produce colleague Kyary Pamyu Pamyu's new song besides Harajuku Iyahoi, and that the song would be a collaboration with a foreign artist in lieu of the singer's fifth debut anniversary. The song was revealed as "Crazy Crazy", and the artist to be featured was British singer Charli XCX. The song was released on January 18, 2017. In April 2017, Nakata contributed an instrumental for the NHK TV program News Check 11 titled "Source of Light". In June, Nakata released the song "White Cube" for streaming in his SoundCloud account. The track is a tie-up song to the Nissin Cup Noodle brand. In July, Nakata contributed a theme song for the TBS-MBS TV drama "Maji de Koukai Shitemasu" titled "Jump in Tonight". The song features vocals from Japanese model and 2016 Lawson Dream Audition grand winner Momo Mashiro. On August 9, 2017, Ultra Records released the song "Love Don't Lie", which was produced by Nakata and featured vocals from singer Rosii. On October 20, 2017, Nakata released the track "Give You More" as a digital single. The track is a tie-up to the Japanese Red Bull music festival that year.

== Track listing ==
All songs and written and produced by Yasutaka Nakata except track 8, co-written and co-produced by Banvox. Vocals for "Crazy Crazy" produced by Nakata (for Kyary Pamyu Pamyu) and Charli XCX (for her own vocals). Vocals for "Love Don't Lie" produced by Rosie Singleton and James Christos Hajigeorgiou.

No.	Title	Lyrics	Music	Length
1.	"White Cube"	-	Yasutaka Nakata	3:33
2.	"Crazy Crazy" (featuring Charli XCX and Kyary Pamyu Pamyu)	Charli XCX	Nakata	3:45
3.	"Love Don't Lie" (featuring ROSII)	Rosie Singleton, James Christos Hajigeorgiou	Nakata	3:19
4.	"Nanimono" (featuring Kenshi Yonezu)	Yonezu Kenshi	Nakata	4:03
5.	"Source of Light"	-	Nakata	3:32
6.	"Digital Native"	-	Nakata	3:21
7.	"Jump in Tonight" (featuring Momo Mashiro)	Nakata	Nakata	2:14
8.	"Level Up" (featuring Banvox)	-	Nakata, Banvox	4:45
9.	"Wire Frame Baby" (featuring Mamiko of Chelmico)	Mamiko	Nakata	4:03
10.	"Give You More"	-	Nakata	3:19

== Charts ==
Chart	Peak position	Sales
Oricon Weekly Albums	13	6,990
Oricon Monthly Albums	41	6,990
Oricon Weekly Digital Albums	1	2,913
