= Flash Back =

Studio album by Capsule
- Released: December 5, 2007 (Japan)
- Genre: J-pop, dance, retro-pop, electropop
- Language: Japanese, with some English
- Label: Contemode
- Producer: Yasutaka Nakata

Capsule chronology
Capsule rmx (2007)	Flash Back (2007)	More! More! More! (2008)

Flash Back is an album by the Japanese electronica band Capsule. It was released on 5 December 2007. It is their first original album to be released after they announced a semi-hiatus in summer 2007, after promotions for Sugarless Girl finished. The album was also released on the same day as Nakata's recording with MEG, "Beam".

== Track list ==
* indicates vocals from the duo's vocalist, Koshijima Toshiko.

No.	Title	Length
1.	"construction"	1:01
2.	"FLASH BACK"	4:43
3.	"Eternity*"	4:08
4.	"You are the reason"	5:14
5.	"Love Me"	4:09
6.	"I'm Feeling You*"	5:06
7.	"MUSiXXX*"	5:35
8.	"Get down*"	4:21
9.	"Electric light Moon light*"	3:45

== Chart performance ==
Chart performance for Flash Back
Chart (2007)	Peak position
Japan (Oricon)	20

== Links ==
- capsule - FLASH BACK (2021 Remaster) on YouTube
