= Natsumelo =

Studio album by Mito Natsume
- Released: April 26, 2017
- Recorded: 2015–17
- Genre: J-pop; pop-rock; alternative dance; post-disco
- Length: 49:54
- Language: Japanese
- Label: Sony Music Associated
- Producer: Yasutaka Nakata

Singles from Natsumelo
- 1. "Maegami Kirisugita" Released: April 8, 2015; 2. "8-bit Boy" Released: September 16, 2015; 3. "I'll Do My Best" Released: April 6, 2016; 4. "Puzzle/Hanabira" Released: February 22, 2017

Natsumelo (なつめろ, Natsumero) is the debut and only studio album by Japanese model-singer Mito Natsume, released on April 26, 2017, by Sony Music Japan sublabel Sony Music Associated Records. The album is marketed as a "culmination of her activities as a singer." Completely produced by Japanese electronica musician Yasutaka Nakata, the album contains a total of twelve tracks, with its singles from her debut song "Maegami Kirisugita" (2015) up to "Puzzle/Hanabira" (2017), its B-sides and four previously unreleased songs.

The album debuted at number 64 in the Oricon Weekly Albums Charts, selling 1,261 copies on its first week of release.

== Background ==
Mito started working as a model in 2010 and was able to be featured later in Japanese magazines like Mer, Zip, and Non-no. She later released self-produced photoshoot book "Natsume-san" in 2013, selling 50,000 copies. In January 2015, her management Asobisystem got her a recording contract under Sony Music Associated Records, a sublabel of Sony Music Japan. It was later announced that her music will be produced by Japanese electronica duo Capsule member Yasutaka Nakata. Before her debut, she recorded the song "Nemu Nemu Go". In February 2015, it was announced that Mito will be releasing her debut single, "Maegami Kirisugita", on April 8, 2015. In conjunction with the release, she had contributed the theme song to the Japanese romantic movie "Koisuru Vampire" titled "Colony". The song was included as a B-side to the said single. Nakata, in addition, contributed the composition piece "KT" for the movie.

In September 2015, Mito released her second single, "8-bit Boy", which was used as the main theme to the Japanese premiere of the American movie Pixels. Its B-side track, "Watashi wo Fes ni Tsuretette", was released as a separate digital single, and has received a music video.

On April 6, 2016, Mito's third single, "I'll do my best", was released. It was released on the same day as girl group Perfume's fifth studio album, "Cosmic Explorer". The song was criticized for its chorus, allegedly sounding similar to Perfume's 2011 single, "Laser Beam". In May 2016, a song titled "Odekake Summer" was released in a form of music video to promote a Japanese mosquito repellent brand.

In December 2016, It was announced that Mito will be contributing a song for an anime for the first time. The song was revealed to be "puzzle", which became the ending theme to the animation series Puzzle & Dragons X. The song was officially released as a double A-side single, "Puzzle/Hanabira", on February 22, 2017. The latter was used as a tie-up commercial song to Oyatsu Company's Ramen Noodle Snack product. Despite the tie-ups, it became Mito's lowest-selling single, debuting at number 108 in the Oricon Weekly Singles Chart with 639 copies sold.

Few days after the release of the single, Mito's agency, Asobisystem and record label Sony Music Japan, has announced that she will finally be releasing her debut studio album on April 26. The cover and tracklist were revealed later that month.

All songs from all of her singles, except for "Kyabetsu no Yatsu no Uta", which was another B-side track from her debut single "Maegami Kirisugita", were included in the album.

== Track listing ==
All tracks are written by Yasutaka Nakata.

No.	Title	Length
1.	"Maegami Kirisugita" (前髪切りすぎた; I Cut My Bangs Too Short)	3:52
2.	"Odekake Summer" (おでかけサマー; Going-out Summer)	3:27
3.	"8-bit Boy" (8ビットボーイ)	4:03
4.	"I'll do my best"	4:31
5.	"Colony" (コロニー)	3:58
6.	"Hanabira" (ハナビラ; Petal)	4:01
7.	"Moshimo Cooking" (もしもクッキング; What-if Cooking)	4:22
8.	"Natsumelo" (なつめろ; Nostalgic Tune)	4:08
9.	"Puzzle" (パズル)	3:35
10.	"Nemu Nemu Go" (ねむねむGO; Sleepy Sleepy Go)	4:32
11.	"Watashi wo Fes ni Tsuretette" (わたしをフェスに連れてって; Bring Me to the Festival)	4:57
12.	"Fuusen to Hari" (風船と針; Balloons and Needles)	4:22

== Charts ==
Chart	Peak position	Sales
Japan Oricon Weekly Albums	64	1,261
