= Crazy Crazy / Harajuku Iyahoi =

Single by Yasutaka Nakata featuring Charli XCX and Kyary Pamyu Pamyu

from the album Digital Native ("Crazy Crazy") and Japamyu ("Harajuku Iyahoi")
- Released: January 18, 2017
- Recorded: 2016
- Genre: Synthpop ("Crazy Crazy") J-pop, EDM ("Harajuku Iyahoi")
- Length: 17:47
- Label: Unborde; Warner Music Japan
- Songwriters: Yasutaka Nakata; Charlotte Aitchison (lyrics, "Crazy Crazy" only)
- Producer: Yasutaka Nakata

Yasutaka Nakata singles chronology
"Nanimono" (2016)	"Crazy Crazy" (2017)

Charli XCX singles chronology
"After the Afterparty" (2016)	"Crazy Crazy" (2017)	"1 Night" (2017)

Kyary Pamyu Pamyu singles chronology
"Sai & Co" (2016)	"Harajuku Iyahoi" (2017)	"Easta" (2017)

Music video
- "Crazy Crazy" on YouTube

"Crazy Crazy / Harajuku Iyahoi" (Crazy Crazy / 原宿いやほい) is the first physical single (second overall) by Japanese producer and Capsule member Yasutaka Nakata, and as well as the 13th single by Japanese singer Kyary Pamyu Pamyu, released on January 18, 2017. The single was released in both CD and digital editions, also marking their first split single. It is also marked as the first collaboration single with British singer and songwriter Charli XCX.

Both songs were used as promotion for two different events: the "Special DJ + Live Zepp Tour 2016: YSTK x KPP" and the "Asobinite!!!- Kyary Pamyu Pamyu Birthday Special: YSTK x KPP Club Edition".

== Background, production and release ==
"Crazy Crazy" was composed by Nakata with lyrics by Charli XCX. Pamyu Pamyu had wanted to collaborate with an outside artist for some time. Nakata later confirmed that Charli XCX was the artist that they were collaborating with. While recording the song, Pamyu Pamyu had difficulty singing in full English.

The teaser video for "Crazy Crazy" was produced by Nakata and shot in Los Angeles and Tokyo. Actual audience participation during the music video was endorsed using "Face Swap" which was popularized by Snapchat. The music video was released on January 26, 2017.

== Track listing ==
CD
No.	Title	Writer(s)	Length
1.	"Crazy Crazy" (featuring Charli XCX and Kyary Pamyu Pamyu)	Charlotte Aitchison (lyrics); Yasutaka Nakata (music)	3:46
2.	"Crazy Crazy" (featuring Charli XCX and Kyary Pamyu Pamyu) (Remix)	Aitchison (lyrics); Nakata (music)	4:41
3.	"Harajuku Iyahoi" (原宿いやほい)	Nakata	3:41
4.	"Harajuku Iyahoi" (Extended Mix)	Nakata	5:39

All lyrics are written by Charlotte Aitchison; all music is composed by Yasutaka Nakata.

Digital download ("Yasutaka Nakata - Crazy Crazy")
No.	Title	Length
1.	"Crazy Crazy" (featuring Charli XCX and Kyary Pamyu Pamyu)	3:46
2.	"Crazy Crazy" (featuring Charli XCX and Kyary Pamyu Pamyu) (Remix)	4:41

All tracks are written by Yasutaka Nakata.

Digital download ("Kyary Pamyu Pamyu - Harajuku Iyahoi")
No.	Title	Length
1.	"Harajuku Iyahoi" (原宿いやほい)	3:41
2.	"Harajuku Iyahoi" (Extended Mix)	5:39
