= Japamyu =

Album by Kyary Pamyu Pamyu

- Regular edition cover

Studio album by Kyary Pamyu Pamyu
- Released: September 26, 2018
- Recorded: 2016–2018
- Genre: J-pop; electropop; EDM; bubblegum pop
- Length: 35:57
- Label: Unborde; Warner Music Japan
- Producer: Yasutaka Nakata

Kyary Pamyu Pamyu chronology
KPP Best (2016)	Japamyu (2018)	Candy Racer (2021)

Kyary Pamyu Pamyu studio album chronology
Pika Pika Fantajin (2014)	Japamyu (2018)	Candy Racer (2021)

Singles from Japamyu
- 1. "Harajuku Iyahoi" Released: January 1, 2017 (digital download); 2. "Kimino Mikata" Released: April 18, 2018 (digital download); 3. "Kizunami" Released: September 7, 2018 (digital download)

Japamyu (じゃぱみゅ) is the fourth studio album by Japanese model-singer Kyary Pamyu Pamyu, released on September 26, 2018, by Warner Music Japan sublabel Unborde. The album debuted at number 12 of the Oricon Weekly Albums chart, selling 10,407 copies on its first week of release as well as at number seven of the Oricon Weekly Digital Albums chart with 876 downloads.

== Track listing ==
All tracks are written by Yasutaka Nakata

No.	Title	Length
1.	"Virtual Pamyu Pamyu" (バーチャルぱみゅぱみゅ)	1:40
2.	"Kizunami" (キズナミ; Bonds)	3:48
3.	"Harajuku Iyahoi" (原宿いやほい; Harajuku Yahoo)	3:41
4.	"Oto no Kuni" (音ノ国; Sound Nation)	4:03
5.	"Kimi no Mikata" (きみのみかた; Your Friend)	3:04
6.	"Chami Chami Charming" (ちゃみ ちゃみ ちゃーみん)	4:36
7.	"Enka Natrium" (演歌ナトリウム; Sodium Enka-loride)	2:49
8.	"Koi no Hana" (恋ノ花; Love Flower; Capsule cover)	4:39
9.	"Todoke Punch" (とどけぱんち; Aim to Punch)	2:58
10.	"Sai & Co (Album Edit)" (最＆高; Great&Est)	4:33
Total length:		35:57

== Charts ==
Chart (2018)	Peak position
Japanese Weekly Albums Chart (Oricon)	12
Japanese Weekly Digital Albums Chart (Oricon)	7
