= Stereo Worxxx =

Studio album by Capsule
- Released: March 7, 2012
- Recorded: 2011
- Genre: EDM, house
- Length: 43:58
- Language: English, with some Japanese
- Label: Yamaha
- Producer: Yasutaka Nakata

Capsule chronology
| World of Fantasy (2011) | Stereo Worxxx (2012) | Rewind Best (1/2) (2013) |

Singles from Stereo Worxxx
- 1. "Step on the Floor" Released: February 1, 2012; 2. "Feelin' Alright" Released: April 2, 2012

Stereo Worxxx (sometimes titled as Stereo Works) is the thirteenth studio album by electronica band Capsule. It was released on March 7, 2012, by Yamaha. Produced, composed and written by Capsule member Yasutaka Nakata, Stereo Worxxx was the duo's last album with their label Yamaha until transferring with Warner Music Japan and Nakata's own label, Unborde. Musically, Stereo Worxxx focuses on electronic dance music and house music with Capsule member Toshiko Koshijima singing on all tracks apart from "Motor Force".

Stereo Worxxx received generally favourable reviews from contemporary music, with many praising the quality and sound, while some criticized Nakata's lack of innovation production-wise and musical comparisons with their previous albums. The album spawned two digital singles: "Feelin' Alright" and "Step on the Floor". The album sold 15,308 copies on its first week of release, debuting and peaking at number five on the Japanese Oricon Albums Chart. The group went on a promotional tour for the album, all throughout Japan.

== Background ==
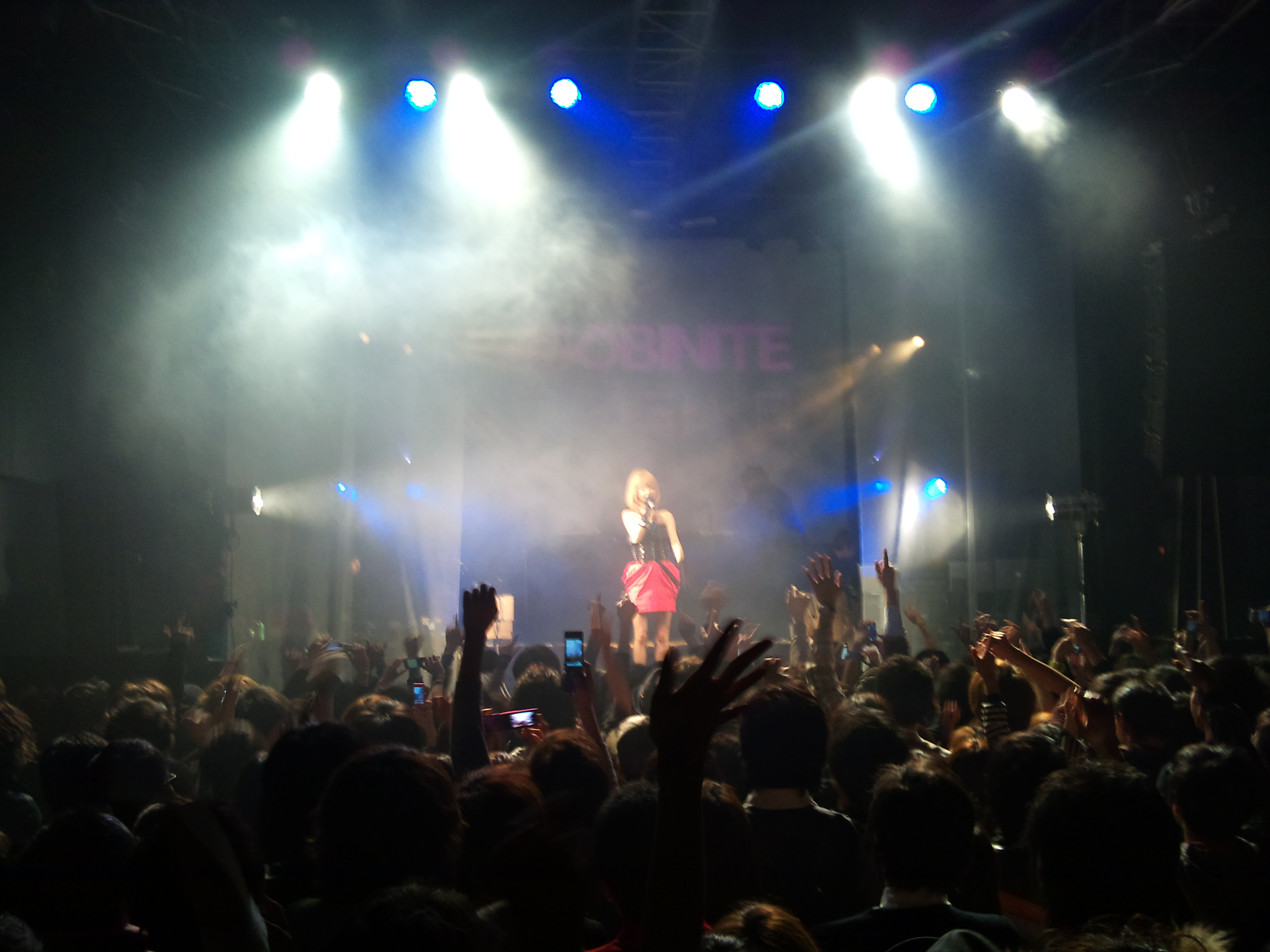
Apart from the track "Motor Force", Capsule member Toshiko Koshijima (pictured) recorded all the songs on the album.

Capsule member, Yasutaka Nakata, began producing music for Japanese recording artist Kyary Pamyu Pamyu in 2011, after the release of the duo's twelfth studio album, World of Fantasy (2011) and at the beginnings of making Stereo Worxxx. He concentrated on producing Pamyu Pamyu's debut album in mid-late 2011, but came to a halt in order to start work with Capsule member Toshiko Koshijima. While producing the album, he wanted to be influenced by "different things" and cited Pamyu Pamyu as an influence to the album. On December 11, 2011, they confirmed the release of Stereo Worxxx for March 2012, nine months after the release of World of Fantasy.

Nakata stated that throughout the process of the album, he fussed over his professionalism as a producer; "as a professional musician, I want to make music where I fuss over every little sound. The music that would result if I stopped would be very much in the convience [sic] industry, so I want to hold it back. So with Stereo Worxxx, I fused[sic] over everything, including the title. We can't decrease the amount of music people want to hear over great speakers." Despite this, he never had an initial concept for the album and made music "based on whatever I feel every time, and the concept just comes up with it." Koshijima commented about the production and her input to the album; "The basic has never changed; however, I deliberately tried to sing the best I could as if creating the best sound of me."

== Composition ==
Stereo Worxxx features nine tracks is their second English language studio album after World of Fantasy. Apart from the track "Motor Force", Koshijima sings in all the tracks on the album. Unlike their previous albums, acoustic instruments such as guitars and drums are used in the album. The album opener is "Feelin' Alright", an electronic and rock song. Featuring instrumentation of live guitars and synthesizers, the song only mentions the title phrase through its chorus. The second track, "Never Let Me Go", is a dance song that features Koshijima whispering and singing "Never let me go" in the chorus; Ian Martin from The Japan Times compared the song to the work of Japanese girl group Perfume. The third track, "In the Rain", is an electronic song with influences of "spacey" ambient music. The fourth track, "Dee J", features vocals from Koshijima and samples baby laughs, but was criticized by critics for its comparisons to their songs "STRIKER" and "I JUST WANT TO XXX YOU" from World of Fantasy.

The fifth track, "Step on the Floor", is an uptempo pop and electropop track that was highlighted by several critics as an album stand out; Martin labelled it Capsule's "most complete pop song" to date. Both "Tapping Beats" and "All the Way" are dance tracks that have been compared to the work from World of Fantasy, while the latter was directly compared to its title track. The eighth track, "Motor Force", is an instrumental dance piece that was compared to the work of World of Fantasy. The ninth and final track, "Transparent", is a slow "intelligent pop song" that was hailed by critics as one of their best and emotionally delivered tracks to date; Nakata commented on the track;

"At first I wanted to do an album of nothing but songs like this one. This became a song where I took care to copy it by ear. Even I thought I was doing something interesting. But it was hard to find its place in the album, and it eventually became the 9th and final song. I'm not saying that I'd like to have the opportunity to do mainly this kind of music in the future. Instead, I think I would have made the album more "Japanese" if I'd been able to extend the deadline by two months and focus only on 'Transparent.'"

== Release and promotion ==
Stereo Worxxx was released on March 7, 2012 through Yamaha. There are two formats for Stereo Worxxx; a regular edition with one disc, and a limited edition with one standard disc, and a second disc with extended mixes of selected tracks from the album. The album sleeve was released on February 1, featuring Koshijima sitting down while holding a speaker, in front of a black backdrop. The Capsule logo was used in the top-left corner. To promote the album, Capsule went on a promotional tour throughout Japan. They toured for six dates, starting at Ishikawa Prefecture on April 7, 2012 and finished in Fukuoka Prefecture on July 16, 2012. The original date for Fukuoka was postponed from May 3 to July 16 because the concert venue was not opened at the time.

"Feelin' Alright" and "Step on the Floor" were chosen to be the album's lead promotional tracks. "Feelin' Alright" featured two accompanying music videos: one with Koshijima in a doll house, produced in collaboration with Japanese app Cotto; it was published on Yamaha's YouTube channel. The other version was a simple computer-generated graphic animation. "Step on the Floor" was released on February 1, 2012 through iTunes. An original, instrumental version of "Tapping Beats" was used in the soundtrack Liar Game.

== Critical reception ==
Professional ratings
Review scores
| Source | Rating |
|---|---|
| Earmilk | (Positive) |
| The Japan Times | (Fairly favourable) |
| Make Believe Melodies | (Fairly favourable) |
| Mind Equals Blown | 9/10 |
| Wake Side Division | (Positive) |

Stereo Worxxx received generally favourable reviews from music critics. Ian Martin commented that while most of the track were catchy, he felt "The wild party of 2011’s World of Fantasy still seems to be raging on into 2012, with Nakata continuing to integrate tribal and Japanese festival rhythms into his music...", citing "Tapping Beats" and "All the Way" as examples. He concluded "There’s certainly a lot to take away from Stereo Worxxx, but it’s definitely a transitional album with no clear sense of direction or identity. It has material to tantalize fans of both its predecessor and Nakata’s work with Perfume, but probably not enough to satisfy either. Importantly though, it makes clear that these two poles are not irreconcilable, which could augur very well for the future." Patrick St. Michel from Make Believe Melodies also felt that the music from Stereo Worxxx was comparable to World of Fantasy, and felt that songs like "In the Rain" and "Tapping Beats" ruined the albums sonic flow. However, he concluded it as a "good, uncomplicated album".

Chris P from Wake Side Division was positive in his review, stating "Stereo Worxxx is kind of "happy music." The experience overall with the release is positive and that makes it fun to listen to." Sebastian Fonseca from Mind Equals Blown said "At the end of the day Stereo Worxxx isn’t capsule’s best album, and fans will continue to hail More! More! More! as their magnum opus. However don’t let that discourage you from listening to this record as it has some of the best tracks the duo has ever recorded. It may be a representation of a different capsule, but a genius one nonetheless." Jeff Lourenço from Earmilk was positive towards the production by Nakata, saying "The unique sound these two put together is truly something you’ve never heard before... This album carries many different tracks such as my favorite of the LP, "Transparent," which is softer, but gives you that blissful slow dance feel."

== Commercial performance ==
Stereo Worxxx sold 15,308 units on its first week of release, debuting and peaking at number five on the Japanese Oricon Albums Chart. The album stayed in the charts for eight weeks, their fifth longest spanning album in the regions chart. With over 24,000 units sold in Japan, Stereo Worxxx is Capsule's sixth best selling album according to Oricon, and their second best selling album inside the 2010s decade, just behind Player (2010).

== Track listing ==
All tracks are written by Yasutaka Nakata.

CD
| No. | Title | Length |
|---|---|---|
| 1. | "Feelin' Alright" | 4:00 |
| 2. | "Never Let Me Go" | 4:45 |
| 3. | "In the Rain" | 6:00 |
| 4. | "Dee J" | 4:20 |
| 5. | "Step on The Floor" | 5:12 |
| 6. | "Tapping Beats" | 3:17 |
| 7. | "All The Way" | 5:14 |
| 8. | "Motor Force" | 5:36 |
| 9. | "Transparent" | 4:00 |
| Total length: | | 43:58 |

All tracks are written by Yasutaka Nakata.

Bonus disc
| No. | Title | Length |
|---|---|---|
| 1. | "Feelin' Alright" (extended mix) | 5:02 |
| 2. | "Never Let Me Go" (extended mix) | 6:06 |
| 3. | "In the Rain" (extended mix) | 6:48 |
| 4. | "Dee J" (extended mix) | 5:53 |
| 5. | "All the Way" (extended mix) | 5:43 |
| 6. | "Motor Force" (extended mix) | 7:19 |
| Total length: | | 36:51 |

== Charts and sales ==
=== Charts ===
| Chart (2012) | Peak position |
|---|---|
| Japan Daily Chart (Oricon) | 3 |
| Japan Weekly Chart (Oricon) | 5 |

=== Sales ===
| Region | Certification | Certified units/sales |
|---|---|---|
| Japan | — | 24,000 |
