= Kimi ga Iine Kuretara =

Single by Kyary Pamyu Pamyu

from the album Candy Racer
- Released: May 10, 2019; February 2020 (vinyl)
- Recorded: 2019
- Genre: J-pop; electropop
- Length: 3:43
- Label: Asobisystem
- Songwriter: Yasutaka Nakata
- Producer: Yasutaka Nakata

Kyary Pamyu Pamyu singles chronology
| "Kimino Mikata" (2018) | "Kimi ga Iine Kuretara" (2019) | "Kamaitachi" (2020) |

"Kimi ga Iine Kuretara" (きみがいいねくれたら; lit. "If you give me 'likes'") is a song by Japanese singer Kyary Pamyu Pamyu, released as a digital single on May 10, 2019. The song is used as the ending theme song of the YTV drama Mukai no Bazuru Kazoku (向かいのバズる家族).

== Music video ==
The music video for the song was released on May 9, 2019.

== Live performances ==
Kyary performed the song in Abema TV on May 5 and in Music Station on May 10, 2019. She performed the song with Goro Inagaki, Shingo Katori, and Tsuyoshi Kusanagi on her Abema TV performance.

== Track listing ==
Digital download
| No. | Title | Writer(s) | Length |
|---|---|---|---|
| 1. | "Kimi ga Iine Kuretara" (きみがいいねくれたら) | Yasutaka Nakata | 3:43 |
| Total length: | | | 3:43 |

7" vinyl single
| No. | Title | Writer(s) | Length |
|---|---|---|---|
| 1. | "Kimi ga Iine Kuretara" (きみがいいねくれたら) | Nakata | 3:43 |
| 2. | "Kimi ga Iine Kuretara" (instrumental) | Nakata | 3:43 |

== Charts ==
| Chart (2019) | Peak position |
|---|---|
| Weekly Download Songs (Billboard Japan) | 33 |
