= Polygon Wave EP =

Polygon Wave

EP by Perfume
- Released: September 22, 2021
- Genre: J-pop; dance; nu-disco
- Length: 31:21
- Label: Universal J; Perfume
- Producer: Yasutaka Nakata

Perfume chronology
| Perfume the Best: P Cubed (2019) | Polygon Wave (2021) | Plasma (2022) |

Singles from Polygon Wave
- 1. "Polygon Wave" Released: July 2, 2021

Polygon Wave EP (ポリゴンウェイヴ EP) is the first extended play (EP) by Japanese girl group Perfume, released on September 22, 2021 by Universal Music Japan sublabel Universal J and its imprint Perfume Records.

== Background and composition ==
=== Background ===
A month after the title track's release, an announcement was made that there would be an EP with the same name as the lead single for physical releases. The track listing and cover were published including a teaser.

The EP was released on September 22, 2021 in two editions. The regular edition was physically released with all 7 tracks, while the limited edition featured a bonus video. The contents in the video includes a commentary about the group's previous online concert by the members and Rhizomatiks member Daito Manabe, who was responsible for the visuals of the show.

=== Composition ===
Polygon Wave EP is an extended play consisting of seven tracks that were all written and produced by Yasutaka Nakata.

== Commercial performance ==
Polygon Wave EP debuted at number two of the Oricon Weekly Albums chart with 27,403 copies sold on its first week of release. This became Perfume's first album release not to top the said chart since their debut compilation album Perfume: Complete Best (#24) in the period of 2006-2007.

== Track listing ==
All tracks are written by Yasutaka Nakata

Regular edition
| No. | Title | Length |
|---|---|---|
| 1. | "Polygon Wave" (ポリゴンウェイヴ) (Original mix) | 4:33 |
| 2. | "Polygon Wave" (ポリゴンウェイヴ) | 3:05 |
| 3. | "Polygon Wave" (Remix) | 6:23 |
| 4. | "Polygon Wave" (Instrumental) | 3:05 |
| 5. | "Mugen Loop" (∞ループ) | 4:17 |
| 6. | "Android &" (アンドロイド＆) | 4:13 |
| 7. | "System Reboot (Perfume LIVE 2021 [polygon wave] Intro)" | 5:45 |
| Total length: | | 31:21 |

Limited edition Blu-ray and DVD
| No. | Title | Length |
|---|---|---|
| 1. | "特典映像「Perfume Imaginary Museum "Time Warp"」(主音声/ Perfume 副音声/ 真鍋大度 副音声)" |

== Charts ==
Chart performance for Polygon Wave
| Chart (2021) | Peak position |
|---|---|
| Japanese Albums (Oricon) | 2 |
| Japan Hot Albums (Billboard Japan) | 2 |
