= Sai & Co =

Single by Kyary Pamyu Pamyu

from the album KPP Best
- B-side: "Cosmetic Coaster"
- Released: April 20, 2016
- Recorded: 2015
- Genre: J-pop; dance-pop
- Length: 3:32
- Label: Unborde
- Songwriter(s): Yasutaka Nakata
- Producer(s): Yasutaka Nakata

Kyary Pamyu Pamyu singles chronology
"Crazy Party Night (Pumpkin no Gyakushū)" (2015)	"Sai & Co" (2016)	"Crazy Crazy / Harajuku Iyahoi" (2017)

Music video
- Sai & Co on YouTube

"Sai & Co" (最&高, Sai ando Kō, lit. "The & Best") is the 12th single by Japanese model-singer Kyary Pamyu Pamyu, released on April 20, 2016. The single was released in both CD and digital editions, containing songs tied into several commercials. The title is a play on the word Saikou, meaning Greatest.

"Sai & Co" is used for the Coca-Cola commercials in Japan while "Cosmetic Coaster" is used as a tie-in song for Universal Studios Japan's Kyary Pamyu Pamyu XR: The Ride.

== Background, production and release ==
Released to commemorate Kyary's 5th anniversary in the entertainment business, she announced 5 plans for her anniversary, which includes a collaboration with Universal Studios Japan for the attraction Kyary Pamyu Pamyu XR: The Ride. The song Cosmetic Coaster was made as an official tie-in to the attraction as well as appearing in commercials. Later in a year, a new commercial for Coca-Cola was aired in Japan, featuring the new song "Sai & Co". It was later announced in April that the single featuring both songs is stated for release on April 20.

Sai & Co was remixed twice, the first as an extended mix that was released in Kyary's 14th single "Easta," in 2017 and the second one being an "album edit" included in her fourth studio album, "Japamyu," in 2018.

== Reception ==
The music video for "Sai & Co" received rave reviews internationally. Stereogum listed "Sai & Co" as one of their "5 Best Videos of the Week" and wrote, "It is difficult to make a music video that will give a hardened critic the much-sought-after 'what the heck was that?' reaction. And yet virtually every KPP video gets there. She just keeps coming up with new ways to overload my brain, and I keep coming back." SBS PopAsia called the video "kawaii madness" and wrote, "Words cannot do this MV justice. Prepare to have your mind blown and then sprinkled into little tiny pieces!" Crunchyroll called the video "endearingly surreal" and "mind-bending." The Line of Best Fit described the video as "beautifully bizarre." The Four Oh Five called the video "brilliantly wild and mesmeric." Wonderland Magazine praised both the song and video, calling them "everything you'd expect from Kyary – baffling and brilliant in equal measures" and "deliriously joyous."

== Track listing ==
All tracks are written by Yasutaka Nakata

CD
No.	Title	Length
1.	"Sai & Co"	3.32
2.	"Cosmetic Coaster" (コスメティックコースター Kosumetikku Kōsutā)	3.25
3.	"Mondai Girl -extended mix-"	5.29
4.	"Sai & Co" (instrumental)	3.32
5.	"Cosmetic Coaster" (instrumental)	3.25
