= Wave Runner =

WAVE RUNNER

Studio album by Capsule
- Released: February 18, 2015; September 2, 2015 (repackaged)
- Recorded: August – November 2014
- Genre: Big room house, complextro
- Length: 40:17
- Language: English, with some Japanese
- Label: Unborde; Warner Music Japan
- Producer: Yasutaka Nakata

Capsule chronology
CAPS LOCK (2013)	WAVE RUNNER (2015)	Metro Pulse (2022)

Singles from Wave Runner
- 1. "Feel Again" Released: December 27, 2014 (digital download); 2. "Another World" Released: January 28, 2015 (digital download)

Wave Runner (stylized as WAVE RUNNER) is the fifteenth studio album by Japanese electronica band Capsule, released on February 18, 2015, by Warner Music Japan sublabel Unborde. The album debuted at the fifth spot on the Oricon Weekly Albums chart with 11,395 copies.

== Background ==
The album was announced on August 9, 2014, at their performance in Rock in Japan Fes, as being due for release later that year. The duo performed songs from the album in October and November 2014. Some of the new songs were subjects of continuous rearrangements by Yasutaka Nakata from time to time, with the final versions included in the album. After several months with no further word of the album's release, Unborde announced on November 28, 2014 the album title, track list, cover and promotional photo.

An untitled song from the album, later revealed as "Feel Again", was used as a tie-up song to the illumination Christmas show project of Canal City Hakata.

A new version of the Appleseed Alpha movie theme song "Depth" with Toshiko Koshijima's vocals was included in the album.

== Track listing ==
All songs written and produced by Yasutaka Nakata. All vocals (*) by Toshiko Koshijima.

=== Regular edition ===
CD
No.	Title	Length
1.	"Wave Runner"	1:16
2.	"Another World" (*)	4:25
3.	"Dreamin’ Boy" (*)	5:20
4.	"Hero" (*)	4:12
5.	"Dancing Planet"	4:52
6.	"Depth" (vocal dub mix*)	4:03
7.	"Feel Again" (*)	3:50
8.	"Unrequited Love" (*)	4:37
9.	"White As Snow" (*)	4:11
10.	"Beyond The Sky"	3:41

=== Limited edition bonus disc ===
No.	Title	Length
1.	"Another World" (extended mix)	5:44
2.	"Hero" (extended mix)	5:52
3.	"Feel Again" (extended mix)	5:25
4.	"White As Snow" (extended mix)	5:10

=== Deluxe Edition ===
CD
No.	Title	Lyrics	Length
1.	"Wave Runner"		1:16
2.	"Another World" (*)		4:25
3.	"Dreamin’ Boy" (*)		5:20
4.	"Hero" (*)		4:12
5.	"Dancing Planet"		4:52
6.	"Depth" (vocal dub mix*)		4:03
7.	"Feel Again" (*)		3:50
8.	"Unrequited Love" (*)		4:37
9.	"White As Snow" (*)		4:11
10.	"Beyond The Sky"		3:41
11.	"Dreamin' Boy" (remix*)		3:37
12.	"Dancing Planet" (remix featuring VERBAL of m-flo)	Verbal	4:23

== Charts and certifications ==
=== Japanese charts ===
Chart	Peak position	Sales
Oricon Daily Albums	3	6,931
Oricon Weekly Albums	5	11,395
Oricon Monthly Albums	28	13,465

=== Sales and certifications ===
Chart	Amount
Oricon sales (incl. repackage)	18,559

== Release history ==
Country	Date	Format(s)	Label
Japan	February 18, 2015	CD, Digital download, 2CD	Unborde
