= World of Fantasy (album) =

Studio album by Capsule
- Released: May 25, 2011
- Recorded: 2010–2011
- Genre: Electro house
- Length: 43:54; 15:42 (Disc 2)
- Language: English
- Label: Yamaha
- Producer: Yasutaka Nakata

Capsule chronology
Player (2010)	World of Fantasy (2011)	Stereo Worxxx (2012)

World of Fantasy is the twelfth studio album by the Japanese electronica band Capsule, released on May 25, 2011, in Japan. The album was originally due for release with the title of Killer Wave. After the 2011 Tōhoku earthquake occurred on March 11, 2011, Yasutaka Nakata announced that the album's release (which was previously announced as March 23, 2011) was postponed and due for release at an unknown date for cover art rework and renaming. "Killer Wave" was then considered a "working title". This is the first album of the duo with all songs sung by the vocalist Toshiko Koshijima. It is also their first completely English-language album.

The digital single "World of Fantasy" was released via iTunes on February 8, 2011. Meanwhile, "Prime Time" was used in a commercial for Vantan Design Institute, first shown on February 21, 2011.

The album sold 7,183 units on its first day of release and 20,814 units on its first week, debuting at the #3 spot in the Oricon Daily and Weekly charts. Despite this being their current highest-charting album, it did not manage to outsell their previous album Player. The album sold a total of 24,603 units in Japan in two weeks.

== Track listing ==
All vocals by Toshiko Koshijima.

CD version
No.	Title	Length
1.	"Open the Gate"	1:27
2.	"World of Fantasy"	6:11
3.	"I Just Wanna XXX You"	4:15
4.	"Striker"	5:55
5.	"Keep Hope Alive"	4:05
6.	"I Will"	5:38
7.	"What Is Love"	5:33
8.	"I Can't Say I Like You"	3:38
9.	"Prime Time"	5:43
10.	"Close the Gate"	1:35
Total length:		43:54

iTunes bonus track

iTunes bonus track
No.	Title	Length
11.	"World of Fantasy Mix"

2CD Limited edition version
No.	Title	Length
1.	"World of Fantasy" (extended mix)	8:47
2.	"Striker" (extended mix)	6:56
Total length:		15:42

== Links ==
- capsule - WORLD OF FANTASY (2021 Remaster) on YouTube
