= Baby Cruising Love/Macaroni =

"Baby Cruising Love" "Macaroni (マカロニ)"

Single by Perfume

from the album Game
- A-side: "Baby Cruising Love"; "Macaroni"
- Released: January 16, 2008
- Recorded: 2007
- Genre: J-pop, Dance-pop
- Length: 4:42 (Baby Cruising Love) 4:40 (Macaroni)
- Label: TJC
- Songwriter(s): Yasutaka Nakata
- Producer(s): Yasutaka Nakata

Perfume singles chronology
"Polyrhythm" (2007)	"Baby Cruising Love" "Macaroni (マカロニ)" (2008)	"Love the World" (2008)

Music Videos
- "Baby cruising love" on YouTube
- "Macaroni" on YouTube

"Baby Cruising Love" (stylized as "Baby cruising Love") is a double A-side single release by the Japanese group, Perfume. The other A-side is "Macaroni" (マカロニ, Makaroni). This single is the group's sixth major label single, and eleventh single including indies.

This single was released in two formats, a CD+DVD format (catalog entry TKCA-73310) with the PV for "Baby Cruising Love" on the DVD, and a CD-only format (catalog entry TKCA-73315).

== Track listing ==
=== CD ===
1. "Baby Cruising Love" – 4:42
2. "Macaroni" (マカロニ, Makaroni) – 4:40
3. "Baby Cruising Love ~Original Instrumental~" – 4:41
4. "Macaroni ~Original Instrumental~" – 4:38

=== DVD ===
"Baby Cruising Love" video clip

== Oricon ranks and sales ==
Chart	Peak position	Sales
Oricon Daily	2	63,377
Oricon Weekly	3	63,377
