= Coltemonikha =

Japanese electronica duo

- Origin: Japan
- Genres: J-pop; electropop; electronica; chillout; house; dance-pop
- Years active: 2006–2007; 2011
- Label: contemode
- Past members: Yasutaka Nakata; Kate Sakai

Coltemonikha (stylized as "COLTEMONIKHA" or "COLTEMÖNIKHA") was a Japanese electronica duo consisting of record producer Yasutaka Nakata and model and fashion designer Kate Sakai.

The group formed as a project uniting music and fashion. They produced two mini-albums which were made to complement Sakai's fashion line "Made in Colkinikha" and one compilation album. Their name was a portmanteau of "Colkinikha" and "contemode".

== Members ==
- Yasutaka Nakata (born 1980 February 6) - composition, arrangement, production
- Kate Sakai (born 1982 November 5) - lyrics, vocals

== Musical style ==
Coltemonikha's music is pop-styled with electronic influences. The lyrics, written by Sakai, generally carry a whimsical mood and often contain a blending of Japanese and English.

== Discography ==
=== Extended plays ===
Title	Album details	Peak chart position (Oricon)
Coltemonikha	Released: May 17, 2006; Label: Contemode; Formats: CD, digital download, streaming	208
Coltemonikha 2	Released: September 26, 2007; Label: Contemode; Formats: CD, digital download, streaming	73

=== Compilation albums ===
Title	Album details	Peak chart position (Oricon)
Coltemonikha Best	Released: December 14, 2011; Label: Contemode; Formats: CD+DVD, digital download, streaming	66
