= Metro Pulse (album) =

METRO PULSE
- CD-only and digital cover

Studio album by Capsule
- Released: December 14, 2022
- Recorded: 2021–2022
- Genre: Synthwave; city pop
- Length: 41:47
- Label: Warner Music Japan
- Producer: Yasutaka Nakata

Capsule chronology
Wave Runner (Deluxe Edition) (2015)	METRO PULSE (2022)

Singles from Metro Pulse
- 1. "Hikari no Disco" Released: June 4, 2021 (digital); 2. "Future Wave" Released: September 9, 2021 (digital); 3. "Virtual Freedom" Released: December 10, 2021 (digital)

Metro Pulse (Japanese: メトロパルス Metoro Parusu; romanized as METRO PULSE) is the sixteenth studio album of Japanese duo Capsule, released on December 14, 2022, by Warner Music Japan. This is the duo's first album release in nearly eight years since their 2015 album Wave Runner.

== Commercial performance ==
Metro Pulse debuted at number 23 of the Oricon Weekly Albums chart with 3,317 copies sold on its first week of release. It also debuted at number 16 of the Oricon Digital Albums chart with 462 downloads.

== Track listing ==
All tracks are written by Yasutaka Nakata.

Standard track listing
No.	Title	Length
1.	"Hikari no disco (Album Mix)" (ひかりのディスコ)	5:24
2.	"Give me a ride" (ギヴ・ミー・ア・ライド)	5:06
3.	"Future Wave (Album Mix)" (フューチャー・ウェイヴ)	5:03
4.	"Start" (スタート)	4:04
5.	"Virtual Freedom (Album Mix)" (バーチャル・フリーダム)	4:07
6.	"Wonderland" (ワンダーランド)	2:51
7.	"Seaside dreams" (シーサイド・ドリームス)	2:25
8.	"Starry Night" (スターリー・ナイト)	3:31
9.	"Escape from reality" (エスケープ・フロム・リアリティ)	4:10
10.	"To my world" (トゥー・マイ・ワールド)	5:16

Disc 2 (limited edition)
No.	Title	Length
1.	"Hikari no disco" (ひかりのディスコ)	5:24
2.	"Future Wave" (フューチャー・ウェイヴ)	6:30
3.	"Virtual Freedom" (バーチャル・フリーダム)	4:10
4.	"Starry Night '97" (スターリー・ナイト '97)	3:53
5.	"Hikari no disco (Instrumental)"	5:24
6.	"Future Wave (Instrumental)"	6:30
7.	"Virtual Freedom (Instrumental)"	4:10

Bonus disc (limited edition, pre-order)
No.	Title	Length
1.	"Utsusemi (Movie Version)" (うつせみ)	2:06

=== LP ===
Side A
No.	Title	Length
1.	"Hikari no disco (Album Mix)"	5:24
2.	"Give me a ride"	5:06
3.	"Future Wave (Album Mix)"	5:03
4.	"Start"	4:04

Side B
No.	Title	Length
1.	"Virtual Freedom (Album Mix)"	4:07
2.	"Wonderland"	2:51
3.	"Seaside dreams"	2:25
4.	"Starry Night"	3:31
5.	"Escape from reality"	4:10
6.	"To my world"	5:16

== Charts ==
Weekly chart performance for Metro Pulse
Chart (2022)	Peak position
Japanese Weekly Albums (Oricon)	23
Japanese Weekly Digital Albums (Oricon)	16

== Release history ==
Release history for Metro Pulse
Region	Date	Format	Label
Japan	December 14, 2022	CD; digital download; streaming	Warner Music Japan
Japan	May 24, 2023	LP	Warner Music Japan
