= Fan Service (Sweet) =

Single by Perfume

from the album Game
- A-side: "Chocolate Disco"
- B-side: "Twinkle Snow Powdery Snow"
- Released: February 14, 2007
- Recorded: 2006
- Genre: J-pop; dance-pop; electropop
- Label: Tokuma Japan Communications
- Songwriter: Yasutaka Nakata
- Producer: Yasutaka Nakata

Perfume singles chronology
"Electro World" (2006)	"Fan Service (Sweet)" (2007)	"Polyrhythm" (2007)

Music video
- "Chocolate Disco" on YouTube
- "Twinkle Snow Powdery Snow" on YouTube

"Fan Service [sweet]" (ファン・サーヴィス [sweet]) is Japanese pop group Perfume's ninth single. It was released on February 14, 2007.

Fan Service [sweet] was the group's first single for the year 2007. The release date coincided with Valentine's Day, a theme present in the song "Chocolate Disco". It was issued in special packaging containing a DVD with music videos and a 20-page booklet, and only a limited number of pressings were produced. Both songs were included in the group's album GAME, released the next year.

"Chocolate Disco" has been referred to by young people as a "traditional Valentine's Day song".

== Track listing ==
=== CD ===
Both songs written, composed and arranged by Yasutaka Nakata.

1. "Chocolate Disco"(チョコレイト・ディスコ)
2. "Twinkle Snow Powdery Snow"

=== DVD ===
1. "Chocolate Disco" -Video Clip-(チョコレイト・ディスコ -Video Clip-)
2. "Twinkle Snow Powdery Snow" -Video Clip-
