= More! More! More! =

- More! More! More! (CD Only)

Studio album by Capsule
- Released: November 19, 2008 (Japan)
- Genres: J-pop, synthpop, house, electro, trance
- Length: 45:16
- Language: Japanese / English
- Labels: Contemode, Yamaha Music Communications

Capsule chronology
Flash Back (2007)	More! More! More! (2008)	Flash Best (2009)

More! More! More! (2008) is the tenth studio album by the Japanese electronica band Capsule, released on November 19, 2008. The album reached #3 and #6 on the Oricon daily and weekly charts, making it the band's most successful album in their career selling a total of 67,309 copies and being the duo's first album with a Top 10 ranking.

The tracks "More More More", "Jumper", "Pleasure Ground", "The Mutations of Life" and "Adventure" feature the group's vocalist, Toshiko Koshijima, while "The Time Is Now" and "Phantom" use stock vocals. "e.d.i.t" uses both Toshiko's and stock vocals.

The album was released a week after Nakata's recording with Ami Suzuki, "Supreme Show".

"More More More" appears in the arcade version of Dance Dance Revolution X2.

In October 2021, a remastered version titled "MORE! MORE! MORE! (2021 Remaster)" was released on various platforms.

== Track listing ==
No.	Title	Length
1.	"Runway"	1:20
2.	"More More More"	4:12
3.	"The Time Is Now"	6:32
4.	"Jumper"	6:56
5.	"Phantom"	3:55
6.	"Gateway"	0:39
7.	"Pleasure Ground"	4:48
8.	"The Mutations of Life"	4:24
9.	"e.d.i.t."	6:00
10.	"Adventure"	6:30

== Charts and sales ==
=== Japanese charts ===
Chart	Peak position	Sales
Oricon Weekly Albums	6	
Oricon Yearly Albums	183	52,104

== Links ==
- capsule - MORE! MORE! MORE! (2021 Remaster) on YouTube
