= Game (Perfume album) =

- CD and digital artwork

Studio album by Perfume
- Released: April 16, 2008
- Recorded: 2006–2008
- Studios: Contemode Studio (Tokyo, Japan)
- Genres: EDM; J-pop; techno-pop
- Length: 56:16
- Label: Tokuma Japan Communications
- Producer: Yasutaka Nakata

Perfume chronology
Perfume: Complete Best (2006)	Game (2008)	Triangle (2009)

Singles from Game
- 1. "Fan Service (Sweet)" Released: February 14, 2007; 2. "Polyrhythm" Released: September 12, 2007; 3. "Baby Cruising Love/Macaroni" Released: January 16, 2008

Game (stylised in all caps) is the debut studio album by Japanese girl group Perfume. On April 16, 2008, Tokuma Japan Communications released it in both physical and digital formats. Prior to its release, the band was formed in 2000, with early developments including a lineup change, the release of several singles, and other business ventures. After signing with Tokuma in 2005, the band began working with Japanese musician and producer Yasutaka Nakata, who acted as producer, composer, songwriter, recording assistant, and engineer for the entire album.

Game is an EDM album with elements of J-pop and techno-pop. Nakata's use of techno-pop on the album, as well as in the majority of his collaborations with Perfume, was intended to spark a revival of the genre in the Japanese music industry, with Perfume believing that the sound represented them. In addition to the tracks recorded in Japanese, there is one song sung in English. Music critics gave Game mixed to positive reviews, with some praising the overall sound and cheerful themes and others believing the material was overproduced and lacking depth. Commercially, the album was a success in Japan, reaching number one on the Oricon Albums Chart and being certified double platinum by the Recording Industry Association of Japan (RIAJ) for shipments of over 500,000 copies.

Three singles were released to promote the album: "Fan Service (Sweet)", which included the album tracks "Chocolate Disco" and "Twinkle Snow Powdery Snow", "Polyrhythm", and the double A-side singles "Baby Cruising Love" and "Macaroni". Furthermore, other songs from the album were used as commercial themes across Japan. To promote the album, Perfume went on two tours: the Seventh Heaven promotional tour and the 2008 Game Tour, the latter of which was live the following year. Since the album's release, Game has been regarded as a techno-pop pioneer and a fixture in Japan's pop music industry.

== Background and development ==
Perfume was founded in early 2000 by Kashiyuka (Yuka Kashino), A-chan (Ayaka Nishiwaki), and Yuka Kawashima. Kawashima soon left the group to pursue further studies, and Nocchi (Ayano Omoto) took her place. The group made their debut in 2003 with the single "Omajinai Perori" on Hiroshima-based label Momiji Records, and they went on to release several singles with Bee-Hive Records from 2003 to 2006. A year ago, the group signed with Tokuma Japan Communications and enlisted the assistance of Japanese musician and producer Yasutaka Nakata, who produced three singles for them: "Sweet Doughnuts", "Monochrome Effect", and "Vitamin Drop". Tokuma, on the other hand, decided to release the compilation album Perfume: Complete Best, which included songs from their Bee-Hive era through to "Vitamin Drop".

Following the commercial success of the compilation album, Perfume and Nakata continued to work on new music, their first release being a sample of the songs "Chocolate Disco" and "Twinkle Snow Powdery Snow". Then, in late January and early February 2008, Perfume announced that a new studio album would be released in April of that year. Between 2007 and 2008, the group recorded with Nakata at Contemode Studios in Shibuya, Tokyo, and finished the album by the end of March 2008. Nakata was the album's sole collaborator, producing, composing, writing, engineering, mixing, and mastering it in entirety. Perfume member A-chan described Game as a concept album, stating, "We see each album as being like a concept album...", where as member Nocchi said "This is our first original album. It turned out so good that in every interview I have to say we are confident. It is cool! So I really want people to listen to it."

== Music and content ==
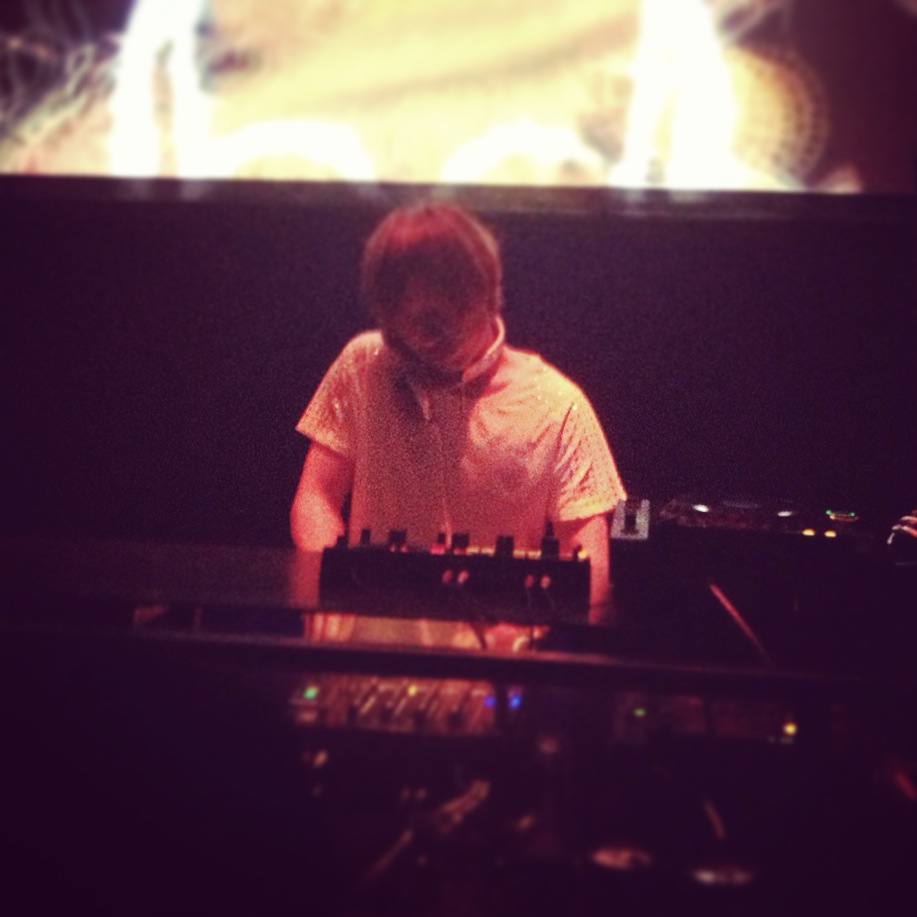
Nakata created the entirety of Game and intended to incorporate the techno-pop genre into the album's sound.

Game is an electronic dance record with elements of J-pop and techno-pop. Regarding the use of techno-pop music, Nakata stated that he was particularly interested in re-inventing the term "techno-pop" for the Japanese music scene; a term first recognised in Western culture in the 1980s, and sonically established by Japanese band Yellow Magic Orchestra, who used the genre in their studio album Naughty Boys (1983). Nakata also incorporated his post-Shibuya-kei sound, which he had previously used for songs produced with Perfume during their time as an indies idol group, into the tracks on Game.

According to Perfume, they were unaware of the techno genre prior to Game; A-Chan stated in an interview with Bomb Magazine, "Well, we have just gotten to the point where we got to like techno music. But we are on the level that we 'like' it, and we don't know the depth of it beyond that. I don't think it is good to go to the next step without learning anything. So I want to know techno to the full first. It may be hard but I want to try at least." Nocchi believed that techno music, at the time of Game's release, represented Perfume.

AllMusic editor Ian Martin said that Game "is successful in the way it navigates its various genres and influences, largely thanks to the deft touch and glossy sheen of Nakata's production." Japanese magazine CDJournal recognised the influence of techno-pop music, while music website Sputnikmusic described it as "electropop." MTV Iggy reviewed Perfume's catalogue and concluded that Japanese club and electronic culture influenced all of Perfume's studio albums, including Game. Several tracks have varied influences, such as techno-pop ("Polyrhythm," "Plastic Smile," "Macaroni," "Twinkle Snow Powdery Snow"), synth-driven electro music ("Game", "Ceramic Girl", "Secret Secret"), elements of club and house music ("Butterfly"), lounge notes ("Take Me, Take Me") and "cutesy" pop and disco elements ("Baby Cruising Love", "Chocolate Disco", "Puppy Love").

== Release and formats ==
On April 16, 2008, Tokuma Japan Communications published Game in digital, physical and streaming formats. The standard CD contains 12 tracks, while the bonus DVD version includes the original music videos for "Macaroni" and "Secret Secret", two live performances in Japan, and three separate music videos for "Macaroni" shot by each member of Perfume. Both versions came in standard jewel cases, but first-press editions included a slipcase and an obi. Mari Amita photographed two cover sleeves for Game, with design elements by Mayuko Yuki. The CD artwork depicts Perfume in a four-by-four room with synthetic grass flooring and futuristic ceiling lighting, while the DVD artwork depicts Perfume in a dark room with several LED lamps.

Following their departure from Tokuma Japan Communications, the group signed with Universal Music Japan in February 2012, gaining distribution rights for their Tokuma projects. In November 2015, Perfume and Universal announced that all of their studio albums would be re-released on 12-inch vinyl on February 17, 2016, as part of a collaborative box set. The game was released in two editions: as part of the Perfume Complete LP Box or separately. The vinyl artwork was based on the CD and DVD covers, with a slip-in case containing the CD artwork.

== Promotion ==
=== Singles and other songs ===
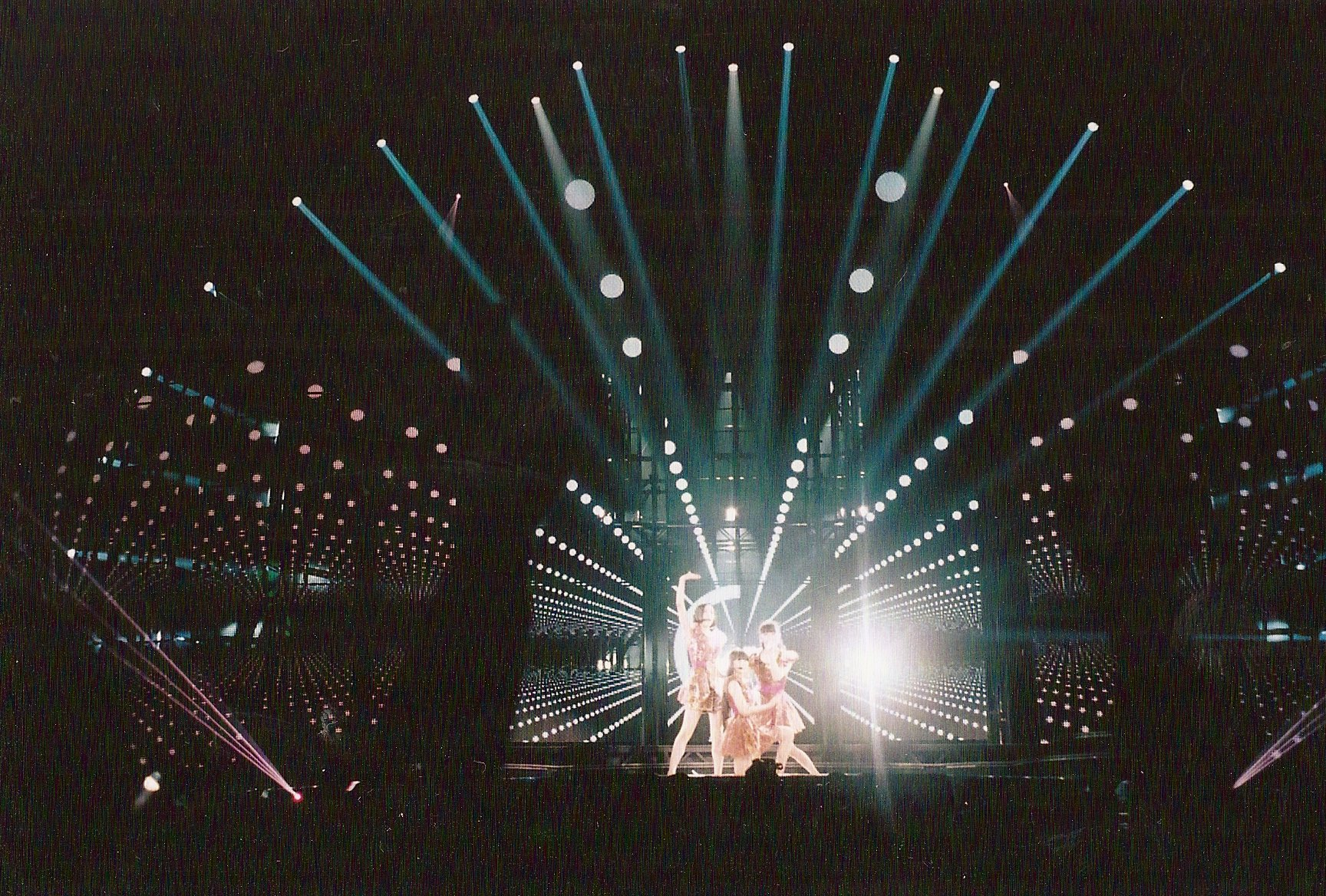
Perfume (pictured) performing "Polyrhythm" during their 4th Tour in Dome (Level3) show.

Tokuma Japan Communication's released "Fan Service (Sweet)" as the album's lead single on February 14, 2007. The single features two songs, "Twinkle Snow Powder Snow" and "Chocolate Disco," as well as a bonus DVD with music videos for each single. "Fan Service (Sweet)" had moderate success in Japan, reaching number 31 on the Japanese Oricon Singles Chart and selling over 10,000 units. Individually, "Twinkle Snow Powder Snow" and "Chocolate Disco" were promoted as airplay singles in Japan, and each track received music videos. "Chocolate Disco" reached number 24 on the Billboard Japan Hot 100 and 76 on the RIAJ Digital Track Chart.

"Polyrhythm" was released as the album's second single on September 12, 2007. The B-side "Seventh Heaven" was available in physical and digital formats of the single, as well as a DVD with the single's music video. "Polyrhythm" was a commercial success, peaking at number seven on Japan's Oricon Singles Chart and charting for 58 weeks, the group's longest-running charting single. "Polyrhythm" sold over 77,000 units in Japan and was certified gold by the Recording Industry Association of Japan (RIAJ) for digital and physical shipments exceeding 100,000 units each in the country. On January 16, 2008, the third and final single "Baby Cruising Love" and "Macaroni" were released as a double A-side. The DVD format included the music video for "Baby Cruising Love". Both "Baby Cruising Love" and "Macaroni" were commercial successes, peaking at number three on Japan's Oricon Singles Chart, and sold over 65,000 units in Japan. The album tracks "Ceramic Girl" and "Secret Secret" both charted on the Japan Hot 100, peaking at 49 and 54, respectively.

A commercial for NHK's national recycling campaign aired on July 1, 2007, featuring Perfume and their song "Polyrhythm". The song appeared on the soundtrack of the 2011 American animated film Cars 2. Perfume was invited to the movie premiere in Los Angeles, California, where the movie's director John Lasseter was delighted to see the girls, stating, "The moment I listened to "Polyrhythm", I loved it, it was like falling in love." "Butterfly" was used as the commercial theme for the Nintendo DS game Infinite Frontier, and "Secret Secret" was used in an Eskimo Pino commercial. All three singles, including "Ceramic Girl," received commercial endorsements, including deals with Nippon TV.

=== Concert tours ===
Perfume embarked on two promotional tours: the Seventh Heaven tour at Japan's Liquidroom and the Perfume Socks Fix Makes Tour in Shibuya, Tokyo. The Seventh Heaven tour included the album tracks "Polyrhythm", "Chocolate Disco", and the B-side track "Seventh Heaven". Tetsuo Hiraga of Hot Express praised specific tracks and the overall stage production. The Socks Fix Makes set list included the album tracks "Baby Cruising Love", "Twinkle Snow Powder Snow", "Macaroni", "Chocolate Disco", "Polyrhythm", and the b-side track "Seventh Heaven". Hiraga attended the show, and believed the Shibuya concert was superior to the Seventh Heaven tour.

Following the album's release, the group announced that their 2008 Game Tour would start in late April 2008. The band toured ten cities in Japan, selling out every show. Several tracks off Game appeared on the tour's set list. Hiraga, who also attended the Yokohama show, praised Perfume's vocal abilities and stage presence, while calling the production "impressive". On the final day of the tour, Perfume announced that they would be performing a two-day show at the Nippon Budokan in November 2008, as well as the release date of their next single, "Love the World". The concert tour DVD was released on October 15, 2008, and peaked atop of Japan's Oricon DVD Chart. The DVD was certified gold by the RIAJ for physical shipments of 100,000 units in Japan.

== Critical reception ==
Professional ratings
Review scores
Source	Rating
AllMusic	3.5/5 stars
CDJournal	(positive)
Hot Express	(positive)
Sputnikmusic	3.5/5

Upon release, Game received mixed reviews from music critics. Ian Martin of AllMusic rated it three and a half stars, saying "One of the most striking points about Game [...] is the tightrope it walks between the varying tastes of their diverse fan base." Despite describing Nakata's production standard as "overwhelm[ing]" at times, Martin concluded "Vocoders and synths abound and the album maintains a coolness and detachment that sets it apart from Perfume's usually irrepressibly cheerful contemporaries in the Japanese pop idol scene." Japanese music magazine CDJournal praised the album's "catchy" nature and Nakata's involvement with the record. Tetsuo Hiraga from Hot Express wrote a positive review, praising Nakata's production and composition, Perfume's image and vocal deliveries, and noting the "alive," "warm-hearted," and "witty" themes throughout the album's songs.

Retrospective reviews tend to be more positive. The music website Sputnikmusic gave it a 3.5 rating out of 5, praising the record's sound and unexpected longevity, with a summary statement describing it as "A subtly substantial cliché of yesterday's pop landscape that still stares confidently into the future." Martin elaborated on the group's longevity in their AllMusic biography, saying: "From there, they remained at the top of the Japanese pop charts, delivering reliably energetic excursions fit for intergalactic dancefloors." He also commented on the aftermath of the record, describing the band as "a further refined version of the template of cute pop idols coupled with the more sophisticated dance music influences that had made them so successful."

Several publications have highlighted Game's influence on Japanese pop culture, the techno-pop genre, and Perfume's success since its release. Daniel Robson of The Japan Times commented; "The sound [Nakata] perfected for [Perfume] with 2008′s breakthrough album [Game] caused a resurgence in demand for off-kilter electro-pop, at that time a niche genre, with labels rushing to release similar artists such as Immi, Sweet Vacation and Urbangarde." A book about the album and the trajectory of Perfume's career was published in the 33⅓ Japan book, Perfume's Game (2018) by Japan-based journalist Patrick St. Michel.

=== Accolades and recognition ===
Game has received numerous accolades. The album received the Best Female Band with Female Lead Vocal Album of the Year award at the 2008 DBSK French J-Pop Awards. At the inaugural CD Shop Awards, Game finished first-equal runner-up to Ohashi Trio's This is Music for the Grand Prix, while Sōtaisei Riron's Shifon Shugi (2008) won the award. The album received the Album of Excellence Award at the 50th Japan Record Awards, along with Hiromi Uehara's Beyond Standard (2008), Keiichi Suzuki's Hate Captain and Love Officer (2008), Namie Amuro's Best Fiction (2008), and Fuyumi Sakamoto's Masterpiece Song Spelling (2008).

In July 2010, Game was ranked ninth among Music Magazine's Best Top 100 Domestic Albums of 2000. Martin named "Baby Cruising Love", "Chocolate Disco", "Macaroni", "Polyrhythm", and "Twinkle Snow Powder Snow" as some of Perfume's best tracks from the album and their entire career. Julie from Go Boiano listed Game at number 12 on her 15 Awesome Albums for Beginners of J-Pop. In 2020, Jonathan McNamara of The Japan Times listed it as one of the ten Japanese albums worth including in Rolling Stone's 2020 list of the 500 Greatest Albums of All Time, writing that "the infectious grooves found on Game and the immeasurable impact it left on both J-pop and electronic music make it essential listening for every pop music fan."

== Commercial performance ==
Game was a commercial success in Japan. It debuted at number one on the Oricon Albums Chart, selling 154,000 copies in its first week of release. This became the highest-selling album by a female group in the first week of 2008, and it was their first album to reach the top spot. It was also Nakata's first produced project to reach number one on the charts, and the first techno-pop album to reach number one since Yellow Magic Orchestra's Naughty Boys (1983); Perfume is only the second techno-pop group to achieve this. Game remained in the top ten for five weeks and on the overall chart for over 120 weeks.

In addition, Game peaked at number two on the Billboard Japan Top Albums Sales Chart, becoming Perfume's first top ten album. At the end of 2008, Game was the country's 23rd best-selling album, selling 391,439 copies. The Recording Industry Association of Japan (RIAJ) certified the album double platinum after it sold over 500,000 copies, and according to Oricon, it is their best-selling effort, selling 476,927 copies in the country.

== Track listing ==
All lyrics are written by Yasutaka Nakata; all music is composed by Yasutaka Nakata.

Game track list
No.	Title	Length
1.	"Polyrhythm" (ポリリズム; Poririzumu)	4:09
2.	"Plastic smile"	4:36
3.	"Game"	5:06
4.	"Baby Cruising Love"	4:41
5.	"Chocolate Disco" (チョコレイト・ディスコ; Chokoreito Disuko)	3:46
6.	"Macaroni" (マカロニ; Makaroni)	4:39
7.	"Ceramic Girl" (セラミックガール; Seramikku Gāru)	4:34
8.	"Take Me Take Me"	5:28
9.	"Secret Secret" (シークレットシークレット; Shīkuretto Shīkuretto)	4:57
10.	"Butterfly"	5:41
11.	"Twinkle Snow Powdery Snow"	3:49
12.	"Puppy Love"	4:32

Game DVD track list
No.	Title	Length
1.	"Polyrhythm (Live at Liquidroom Nov.8 '07)"
2.	"Seventh Heaven (Live at Liquidroom Nov.8 '07)"
3.	"Macaroni: Original Version"
4.	"Ceramic Girl: Drama Another Version"
5.	"Macaroni: A-chan Version"
6.	"Macaroni: Kashiyuka Version"
7.	"Macaroni: Nocchi Version"

== Credits and personnel ==
Details were sourced from the Game liner notes booklet.

- Ayano Ōmoto (Nocchi) – lead vocals, background vocals
- Ayaka Nishiwaki (A-Chan) – lead vocals, background vocals
- Yuka Kashino (Kashiyuka) – lead vocals, background vocals
- Yasutaka Nakata – songwriting, producing, composing, arranging, engineer, mixing, recorded by
- Iku Aoki – album director
- Masahiro Nakawaki – album director
- Satoshi Hasegawa – promotion planning
- Hideo Tanaka – sales promotion
- Momoko Takimoto – product co-ordination
- Atsuko Okuzono – super desk planner
- Hiromi Okawa – management
- Shiro Yamamoto – management
- Yusuke Iwai – management
- Kayoko Takimoto – management
- Takeshi Fukuoka – management
- Nozomi Ishimoto – executive producer
- Masahiro Shinoki – executive producer
- Yokichi Osato – supervisors
- Sumio Matsuzaki – supervisors
- Tatsuro Hatanaka – supervisors
- Shingenori Nishino – supervisors
- Kazuaki "Triple-O" Seki – art direction
- Mari Amita – photographer
- Mayuko "Triple-O" Yuki – designer
- Ken Uchizawa – clothes stylist
- Hatsuhiro Nozawa – hair stylist
- Masako Osuga – make-up artist
- Kiyoe Mizusawa – design coordinator
- Tokuma Japan Communications – Perfume's distribution and record label
- Universal Music Japan – Perfume's 2012–present label; distribution co-rights
- Contemode – Nakata's distribution label, co-rights
- Yamaha Music Communications – Nakata's distribution label, co-rights

== Charts ==
=== Weekly charts ===
Chart (2008)	Peak position
Japanese Albums (Oricon)	1
Japanese Top Albums (Billboard Japan)	2

=== Monthly charts ===
Chart (2008)	Peak position
Japanese Albums (Oricon)	3

=== Year-end charts ===
Chart (2008)	Peak position
Japanese Albums (Oricon)	23

== Certification and sales ==
Region	Certification	Certified units/sales
Japan (RIAJ)	2× Platinum	476,927

== Release history ==
Region	Date	Format(s)	Label	Ref.
Japan	April 16, 2008	CD; DVD	Tokuma Japan Communications	
Various	April 16, 2008	Digital download; streaming	Tokuma Japan Communications	
Japan	February 17, 2016	12" vinyl	Tokuma Japan Communications; Universal Music Japan	

== See also ==
- List of Oricon number-one albums of 2008
