= Sebastian Masuda =

Japanese art director

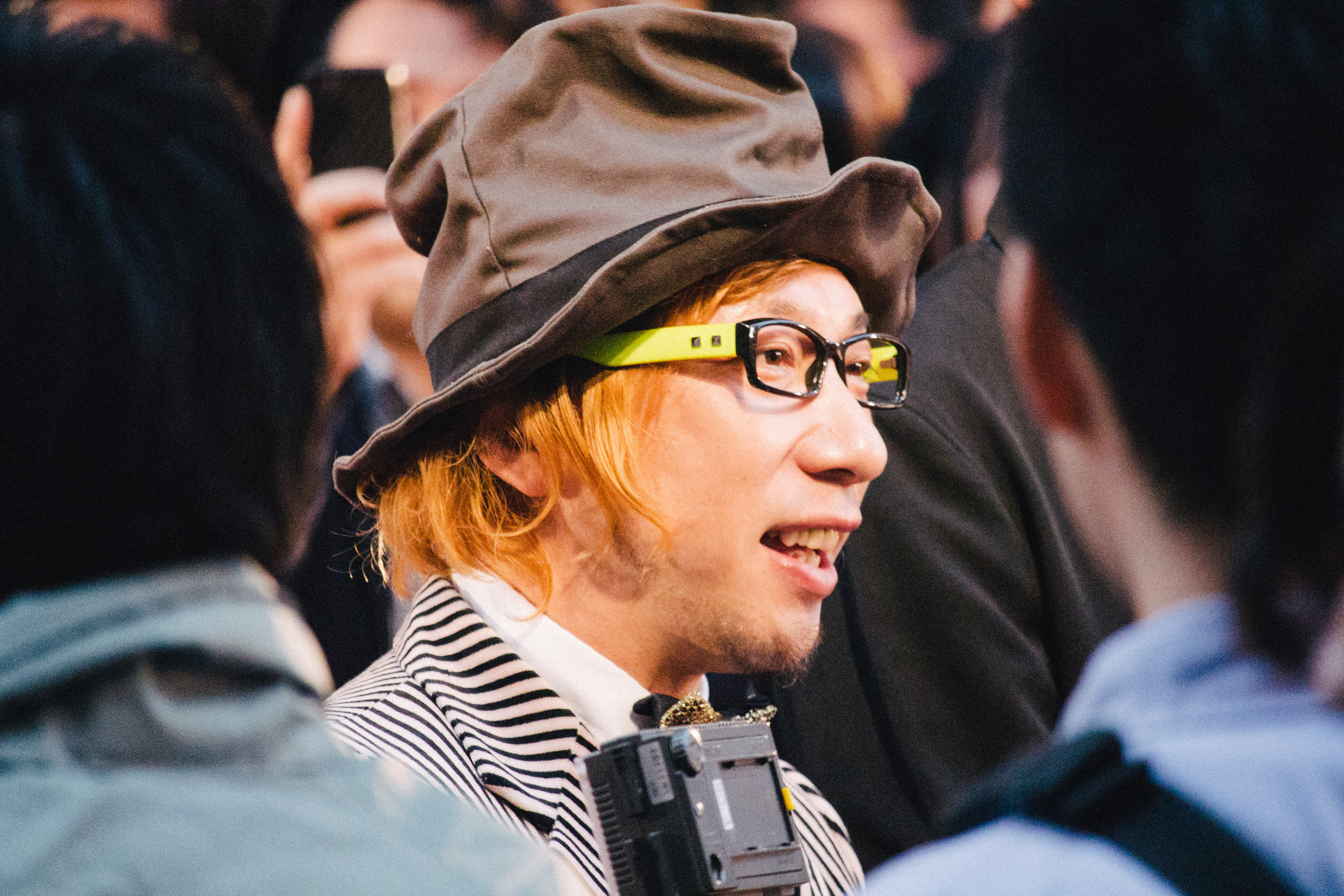
- Sebastian Masuda at the 27th Annual Tokyo International Film Festival
- Born: August 7, 1970 (age 55); Matsudo City, Chiba Prefecture, Japan
- Occupations: Artist, art director, and producer

Sebastian Masuda (増田 セバスチャン, Masuda Sebasuchan; born August 7, 1970), is a Japanese artist, art director, and producer of the Harajuku shop 6%DOKIDOKI. Born in Matsudo City, Chiba Prefecture, Japan. He has been active from 1995 to current day.

He has directed and designed performances for Kyary Pamyu Pamyu. He is known as a pioneer of kawaii culture and often referred to as the "king of kawaii" or "father of kawaii"

== Career ==
Masuda was born in Matsudo City, Chiba Prefecture, Japan. He began his career in the world of theater and contemporary art, but in 1995, Sebastian opened 6%DOKIDOKI in Ura-Harajuku. Celebrities have visited 6%DOKIDOKI, including Conan O'Brien, and clothing and accessories have been worn by BLACKPINK, and Nicki Minaj.

He was the art director for Kyary Pamyu Pamyu's Pon Pon Pon music video in 2011, which garnered international attention. He designed the Kawaii Monster Cafe in Harajuku, which had been a tourist destination, including visits from celebrities Kim Kardashian, singer Dua Lipa and Jennie of K-pop’s Blackpink, Sushidelic in SoHo, Manhattan, New York City, and "Miracle Gift Parade" to commemorate the 25th anniversary of the opening of Sanrio Puroland.

In 2014, he began his first solo exhibition Colorful Rebellion -Seventh Nightmare- in New York.

In 2017, he was appointed as a Cultural Envoy by the Agency for Cultural Affairs and he has lived in the Netherlands while producing artwork, he has traveled to the African continent doing workshops and lectures. He is a visiting professor for Kyoto University of Art and Design and Yokohama College of Art and Design. He was also a visiting scholar at the Department of East Asian Studies at NYU

== Solo exhibitions ==
- 2014「Colorful Rebellion –Seventh nightmare-」(Kianga Ellis Projects, New York February 28, 2014 – March 29, 2014) (Young At Art Museum, Miami July 12, 2014 – January 5, 2015) (Padiglione Visconti, Italy April 14, 2015 – April 19, 2015) (Terrada T-Art Gallery, Tokyo December 18 – 27, 2015) (Tropenmuseum, Amsterdam September 28, 2018 – September 1, 2019)
- 2015「TRUE COLORS」(T-Art Gallery, Tokyo)
- 2016 「TRUE COLORS」(Ronin Gallery, New York)
- 2017 「Point-Rhythm World -Monet's Microcosm- “」(POLA Museum of Art)
- 2017 「YOUR COLORS」(ROPPONGI HILLS A/D GALLERY)
- 2019 「FOREVER COLORS」(ROPPONGI HILLS A/D GALLERY)

== Group exhibitions ==
- December 6, 2014 Time After Time Capsule in Miami
- May 3, 2015 Time After Time Capsule in NYC / Dag Hammarskjold Plaza
- November 13, 2015 – May 2016 Time After Time Capsule NY Hello Kitty meets Seattle / EMP Museum
- April 13–16 2016 Time After Time Capsule in Washington, D.C. / Japan Bowl, National Cherry Blossom Festival
- July 3, 2016 Time After Time Capsule in London / Camden Market North Yard
- July 7–10, 2016 Time After Time Capsule in Paris / Japan Expo
- July 23–24, 2016 Time After Time Capsule in San Francisco/J-POP SUMMIT
- November 26, 27, 2016 Time After Time Capsule in Singapore / Anime Festival Asia
- Nov 1, 2016 – Jan 29, 2017 Time After Time Capsule in Los Angeles / Japanese American National Museum
- May 14, 2017 Time After Time Capsule in NYC vol.2 / Japan Day at Central Park
- Oct. 13, 2017 – Ma 18, 2018 Time After Time Capsule in Alaska / ”The Art of Fandom” at Anchorage Museum
- November 26, 2017 Time After Time Capsule in Cape Town, South Africa / V&A Water Front
- November 30, 2017 Time After Time Capsule in Luanda, Republic of Angola / Angola National School of Arts
- January 13, 2018 Time After Time Capsule in La Paz, Bolivia / Cinemateca Boliviana
- January 20, 2018 Time After Time Capsule in Sao Paulo, Brazil / Japan House
- 2017「The Doremon Exhibition TOKYO 2017」Mori Arts Center Gallery, Tokyo
- 2019「Gaping Hole Secret」Reborn Art Festival 2019
- 2020「Primal Pop (Pac-Man Mix)」The Museum of Pac-Man Art, Tokyo
- 2020「Gaping Hole Secret」Kurkku Fields, Japan
