= Plasma (Perfume album) =

- Standard cover

Studio album by Perfume
- Released: July 27, 2022
- Recorded: 2019–2022
- Genre: Dance; electropop
- Length: 46:55
- Label: Universal J; Perfume
- Producer: Yasutaka Nakata

Perfume chronology
Polygon Wave EP (2021)	Plasma (2022)	Nebula Romance: Part I (2024)

Singles from Plasma
- 1. "Saisei" Released: November 29, 2019 (digital); 2. "Time Warp" Released: September 16, 2020; 3. "Polygon Wave" Released: July 2, 2021 (digital); 4. "Flow" Released: March 9, 2022; 5. "Sayonara Plastic World" Released: April 29, 2022 (digital)

Plasma (stylized in all uppercase) is the seventh studio album by Japanese girl group Perfume, released on July 27, 2022, by Universal Music Japan sub-label Universal J and its imprint Perfume Records. The album consists of twelve tracks: five singles and their B-sides released between November 2019 and April 2022, plus four new tracks.

== Background ==
After the release of the group's third compilation album Perfume the Best: P Cubed and embarking on their concert tour Reframe in 2019, Perfume released a digital single titled "Saisei" on November 29, 2019. The track served as the theme song to the Japanese movie adaptation of Murder at Shinji-so (屍人荘の殺人). Perfume went on their eighth national tour Perfume 8th Tour 2020 “P Cubed” in Dome in February 2020, however, the last date was canceled due to the COVID-19 pandemic. On September 16, 2020, the group released the single "Time Warp" to commemorate the group's fifteenth major-label debut anniversary. On July 2, 2021, Perfume released another digital single titled "Polygon Wave". This was followed by the group's first extended play Polygon Wave EP on September 22, 2021. The EP contained four versions of the song Polygon Wave, two new songs, and a concert intermission track. Despite the aforementioned pandemic, Perfume went on for more concert tours in Japan through the Polygon Wave Tour in 2021 and 2022. Perfume released a new single "Flow" on March 9, 2022. The song was used as an ending theme to the TBS Japanese drama Fight Song. A day before the release of "Flow", the album release was announced, slated for a summer release. On April 29, Perfume released a digital single titled "Sayonara Plastic World". The song served as the theme song for the NHK program Minna no Uta from April to May 2022. The digital single debuted at number 14 of the Oricon Digital Singles chart. On May 31, the album release details were announced. The album's title track, "Spinning World", was released on July 15, 2022, along with its accompanying music video. The song debuted at number 45 of the Oricon Digital Singles chart.

== Composition ==
According to Perfume's management Amuse, Inc., Plasma is an urban electropop album containing tracks from various genres such as city pop, bass music, pop-rock, and funk, with the entire album being "suitable for a change of pace in driving". Like all of the group's albums, all the songs were written, arranged, and produced by Yasutaka Nakata.

== Commercial performance ==
Plasma debuted at number three of the Oricon Weekly Albums chart, selling 42,579 copies in its first week of release. This became Perfume's first studio album not to top the said chart. However, Plasma debuted and peaked at the top spot of the Oricon Weekly Digital Albums chart with 3,033 downloads. On its second week, it dropped to number 19 in the Oricon Weekly Albums chart with 3,330 copies sold. It went further to number 32 the following week with 1,966 copies.

== Track listing ==
All tracks are written by Yasutaka Nakata.

Plasma track listing
No.	Title	Length
1.	"Plasma"	2:04
2.	"Time Warp" (v1.1)	2:52
3.	"Polygon Wave" (original mix)	4:33
4.	"Saisei" (再生)	4:43
5.	"Spinning World"	4:00
6.	"Mawaru Kagami" (マワルカガミ)	3:53
7.	"Flow"	3:04
8.	"Mugen Loop" (∞ループ)	4:17
9.	"Drive'n the Rain"	6:16
10.	"Hatenabito" (ハテナビト)	2:57
11.	"Android &" (アンドロイド&)	4:13
12.	"Sayonara Plastic World" (さよならプラスティックワールド)	3:56

== Charts ==
=== Weekly charts ===
Weekly chart performance for Plasma
Chart (2022)	Peak position
Japanese Albums (Oricon)	3
Japanese Combined Albums (Oricon)	3
Japanese Hot Albums (Billboard Japan)	3

=== Monthly charts ===
Monthly chart performance for Plasma
Chart (2022)	Peak position
Japanese Albums (Oricon)	12

=== Year-end charts ===
Year-end chart performance for Plasma
Chart (2022)	Position
Japanese Albums (Oricon)	72
Japanese Hot Albums (Billboard Japan)	62
