= Easta =

- Regular edition cover

Single by Kyary Pamyu Pamyu
- B-side: "Todoke Punch"
- Released: April 5, 2017
- Recorded: 2017
- Genre: J-pop; folktronica
- Label: Unborde
- Songwriter(s): Yasutaka Nakata
- Producer(s): Yasutaka Nakata

Kyary Pamyu Pamyu singles chronology
"Crazy Crazy / Harajuku Iyahoi" (2017)	"Easta" (2017)	"Kimino Mikata" (2018)

"Easta" (良すた, Ii suta) is the 14th single by Japanese model-singer Kyary Pamyu Pamyu, released on April 5, 2017. The single was released in both CD and digital editions. The title "Ii suta" is a play in Japanese of the word Easter, in which the song is themed and "Ii suta" which means "It's Alright".

== Background ==
"Ii suta" is used as the tie-in song for Aeon Department Store's Let's start Easter party! Campaign. It is the fourth holiday-themed single released by Kyary, announced after the release of Crazy Crazy and both will serve as official themes of certain commercials in Japan. It is also announced that the DVD of the "KPP 5iVE YEARS MONSTER WORLD TOUR 2016" concert in Nippon Budokan, which has some of the songs performed live at the concert would be released on the same day. It also comes bundled with special Virtual Reality glasses, although "system requirements" of the glasses was yet to be confirmed. The teaser for the song was released later on March 31, 2017.

The single's B-side track, "Todoke Punch", was used for Glico's "Ice no Mi" commercial in Japan in June 2017. The song was later included in Kyary's fourth studio album, "Japamyu", the following year.

== Track listing ==
All tracks are written by Yasutaka Nakata

CD
No.	Title	Length
1.	"Easta"
2.	"Todoke Punch" (とどけぱんち Reachable Punch)
3.	"Sai & Co -extended mix-"
4.	"Easta" (instrumental)
5.	"Todoke Punch" (instrumental)
