= Mini (singer) =

- Born: March 12, 1985 (age 41)
- Origin: Japan
- Genres: J-pop, electropop
- Occupations: Singer, model
- Years active: 2010–present
- Label: Cutting Edge/Avex Trax (2010–present)
- Website: http://www.avexnet.or.jp/mini/index.html

Mini (born March 12, 1985) is a Japanese model and electro-pop singer who debuted in 2010 on major label Avex. She is produced by Jin, who also produces GReeeeN.

== Discography ==
=== Albums ===
1. エレクトハーコーバンバンピカソ ("Electro Hardcore Bam Bam Picasso"). (May 9, 2012) Oricon Weekly Albums: No. 257

=== Singles ===
1. Are U Ready? (March 3, 2010)
  1. Are U Ready?
  2. Special memory
  3. Are U Ready? "Nakata Yasutaka (capsule)" Remix
2. Girls Spirit (September 1, 2010)
  1. Girls Spirit
  2. Dear Friend
  3. Baby BaBy
3. Candy Girl 2011 (October 19, 2011)
  1. Candy Girl 2011

=== Collaborations ===
- [2010.01.27] Back-On – ONE STEP! / Tomorrow never knows
1. ONE STEP! (feat.mini)
