= Fruits Clipper =

Album by Capsule

Studio album by Capsule
- Released: May 10, 2006 (Japan)
- Genre: Electropop, electro house
- Length: 40:17
- Language: Japanese, with some English
- Label: Contemode

Capsule chronology
L.D.K. Lounge Designers Killer (2005)	Fruits Clipper (2006)	Sugarless Girl (2007)

Fruits Clipper (stylized FRUITS CLiPPER) is the seventh album by the Japanese electronica band Capsule. It was released in May 2006.

A remastered version was released in August 2021, titled "FRUITS CLiPPER (2021 Remaster)".

== Track list ==
No.	Title	Length
1.	"CS Entrance6"	1:39
2.	"Fruits Clipper"	4:09
3.	"Jelly (album-edit)"	5:06
4.	"Crazeee Skyhopper"	6:15
5.	"5ive Star"	4:43
6.	"Endor"	0:31
7.	"Robot Disco"	2:48
8.	"Super Speeder Judy Jedy"	5:40
9.	"Megalopolis"	4:49
10.	"Dreamin Dreamin"	4:37

Initial copies were sold with a 12 cm vinyl record with the track "School of Electro".

== Links ==
- capsule - FRUITS CLiPPER (2021 Remaster) on YouTube
