= Sugarless Girl =

Studio album by Capsule
- Released: February 21, 2007 (Japan)
- Genre: Electropop, alternative dance
- Length: 36:00
- Label: Contemode

Capsule chronology
Fruits Clipper (2006)	Sugarless Girl (2007)	Capsule rmx (2007)

Sugarless Girl is the eighth album by the Japanese electronica band Capsule, released on February 21, 2007. The tracks "Sugarless GiRL" and "Starry sky" (now stylized as "Starry Sky") are shortened versions of the songs on the single "Starry sky" (previously released on December 13, 2006). "Reality" (now stylized as "REALiTY") is a remix from the single version.

A remastered version, Sugarless GiRL (2021 Remaster), was released in 2021.

== Track list ==
No.	Title	Length
1.	"Welcome to my World"	0:15
2.	"Starry Sky"	5:38
3.	"REALiTY"	4:42
4.	"Sugarless GiRL"	4:09
5.	"Catch my Breath"	3:50
6.	"Spider"	3:40
7.	"MUZiC"	4:12
8.	"Melting Point"	1:23
9.	"Sound of Silence"	3:14
10.	"Secret Paradise"	4:57
11.	"Star Sniper (Bonus)"	6:06

== Links ==
- capsule - Sugarless GiRL (2021 Remaster) on YouTube
