= Yasutaka Nakata =

Japanese music producer and DJ

Yasutaka Nakata 中田 ヤスタカ
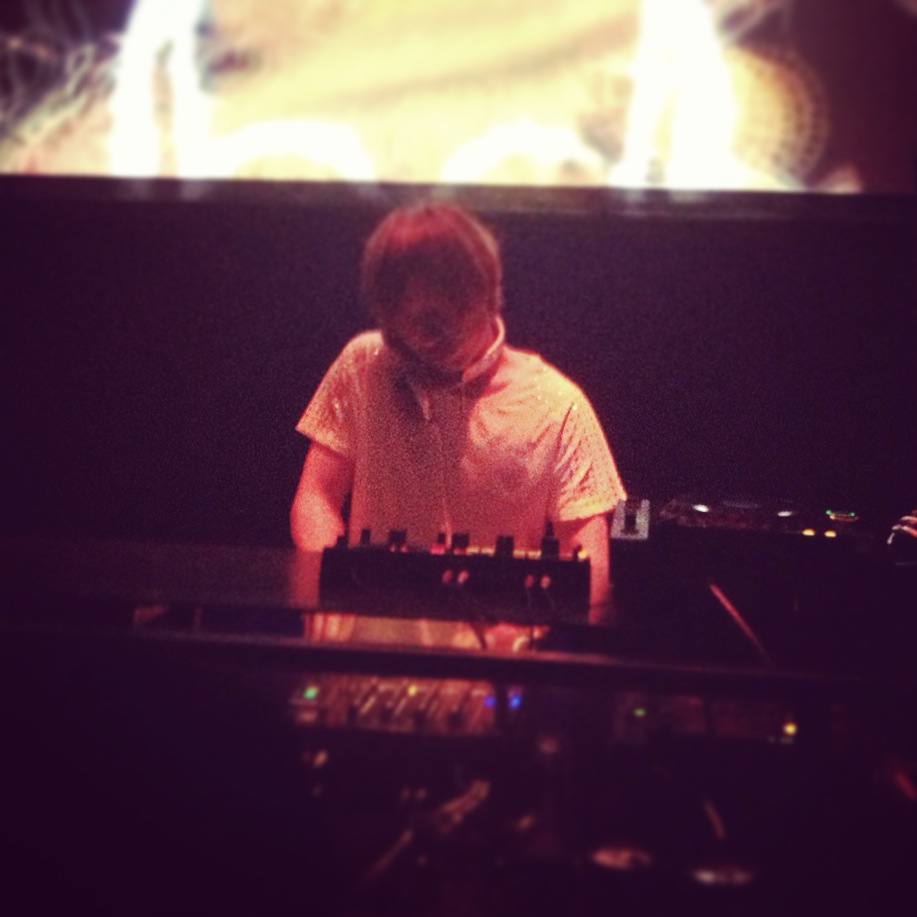
- Yasutaka Nakata in 2013

Background information
- Born: Yasutaka Nakata (中田 康貴); February 6, 1980 (age 46); Kanazawa, Ishikawa, Japan
- Genres: J-pop; electropop; dance-pop; electro house; EDM; Shibuya-kei; electronica; experimental; future bass; dubstep
- Occupations: Music producer, DJ, remixer, composer
- Years active: 1997–present
- Labels: Contemode (former), Warner
- Website: yasutaka-nakata.com

Yasutaka Nakata (中田 ヤスタカ, Nakata Yasutaka; born February 6, 1980) is a Japanese music producer and DJ. He formed the group CAPSULE in 1997 with vocalist Toshiko Koshijima and himself as composer and record producer. The group debuted in 2001 with the song "Sakura".

He is known for being the music producer of Japanese girl group Perfume and Japanese model-turned-singer Kyary Pamyu Pamyu since 2003 and 2011, respectively. These artists have gained commercial success for the songs that Nakata wrote and produced, such as "Chocolate Disco", "Polyrhythm", "Fashion Monster", and "Ninja Re Bang Bang". Nakata has worked with several other Japanese pop singers, including MEG, Ami Suzuki, and SMAP, and has also remixed songs by other artists, including m-Flo and Leah Dizon. He ran his own label, Contemode, in association with Yamaha. After Towa Tei, he was the second Japanese artist to officially remix Kylie Minogue, contributing a version of her single "Get Outta My Way". He also formed Coltemonikha with singer, model, and fashion designer Kate Sakai. In July 2012, he won the "Creator" award for the "Change Maker of the Year 2012" event. The Japan Record Awards also awarded Nakata the Best Music Arrangement Award twice, the first for the songs "Tsukema Tsukeru" by Kyary Pamyu Pamyu and "Spice" by Perfume in 2012, and the second one for Kyary's songs "Harajuku Iyahoi" and "Easta" in 2017. Nakata released his first solo album, Digital Native, on February 7, 2018.

As of September 25, 2019, Nakata has put out a total of ten number-one albums, most as part of his production with Perfume (six albums and two compilations) and Kyary Pamyu Pamyu (two albums).

== Works ==
=== Discography ===
Studio albums

- Digital Native (2018)

=== Albums ===
Studio albums listed are full-length original studio albums fully produced by Yasutaka Nakata.

Year	Title	Artist	Record label	Oricon Weekly chart peak position	Oricon Weekly digital chart peak position
2001	High Collar Girl	Capsule	Yamaha Music Communications	N/A	–
2003	Cutie Cinema Replay	Capsule	Yamaha Music Communications	232	–
2003	Phony Phonic	Capsule	Contemode	120	–
2004	S.F. Sound Furniture	Capsule	Contemode	35	–
2005	Nexus-2060	Capsule	Contemode	59	–
2005	L.D.K. Lounge Designers Killer	Capsule	Contemode	49	–
2006	Fruits Clipper	Capsule	Contemode	29	–
2007	Sugarless Girl	Capsule	Contemode	25	–
2007	Beam	Meg	Universal J	24	–
2007	Flash Back	Capsule	Contemode	20	–
2008	Game	Perfume	Tokuma Japan Communications	1	–
2008	Step	Meg	Universal J	8	–
2008	More! More! More!	Capsule	Contemode	6	–
2008	Supreme Show	Ami Suzuki	Avex Trax	16	–
2009	Beautiful	Meg	Universal J	10	–
2009	Triangle	Perfume	Tokuma Japan Communications	1	–
2010	Player	Capsule	Contemode	4	–
2010	Maverick	Meg	Universal J	20	–
2011	World of Fantasy	Capsule	Contemode	3	–
2011	JPN	Perfume	Tokuma Japan Communications	1	–
2012	Stereo Worxxx	Capsule	Contemode	5	–
2012	Pamyu Pamyu Revolution	Kyary Pamyu Pamyu	Unborde	2	–
2013	Nanda Collection	Kyary Pamyu Pamyu	Unborde	1	–
2013	Level3	Perfume	Universal J	1	–
2013	Caps Lock	Capsule	Unborde	13	–
2014	Pika Pika Fantajin	Kyary Pamyu Pamyu	Unborde	1	–
2015	Wave Runner	Capsule	Unborde	5	–
2016	Cosmic Explorer	Perfume	Universal J	1	–
2017	Natsumelo	Natsume Mito	Sony Music Associated Records	64	N/A
2018	Digital Native	Yasutaka Nakata	Unborde	13	1
2018	Future Pop	Perfume	Universal J	1	1
2018	Japamyu	Kyary Pamyu Pamyu	Unborde	12	7
2021	Candy Racer	Kyary Pamyu Pamyu	Nippon Columbia	22	28
2022	Plasma	Perfume	Universal J	3	1
2022	Metro Pulse	Capsule	Warner Music Japan	23	16
2024	Nebula Romance: Part I	Perfume	Polydor	5	3
2025	Nebula Romance: Part II	Perfume	Polydor		3

=== Produced artists ===
- Capsule (1997–present)
- Perfume (2003–present)
- Kyary Pamyu Pamyu (2011–present)
- PiKi (2025–present)

=== Collaborations ===
- Charli XCX
  - Crazy Crazy Featuring Kyary Pamyu Pamyu (single)
- Coltemonikha
  - From 2006 to 2007 and 2011
- Copter4016882
- E-Girls
  - Music Flyer (album track)
- Masatoshi Hamada (as Hamada Bamyu Bamyu)
  - Nandeyanen-nen (single)
- Marina Inoue
  - Beautiful Story (single)
- Crystal Kay
  - Best of Crystal Kay (compilation album)
    - Step by Step
- Aiko Kayō
  - Cosmic Cosmetics (single)(composer/arranger)
- Kizuna AI
  - AIAIAI (single)
- Marino
  - Lollipop (mini album)
    - Flavor
    - La La Li Lu
- Momo Mashiro (2017–2021)
  - Jump in Tonight (Yasutaka Nakata feat. Momo Mashiro)
  - Pico Pico Tokyo (Yasutaka Nakata feat. Momo Mashiro)
  - Onegai Sequencer
- Seiko Matsuda
  - Wakusei ni Naritai (album track)
- Meg (2007-2012)
- Minmi
  - I Love (album)
    - Kaze ni Nosete
  - Lalala (Ai no Uta) (single)
    - "Taiyō no Shita de"
- Nagisa Cosmetic
- Natsume Mito
  - Songwriter and producer from 2015 to 2017
- Perfume and OK Go
  - I Don't Understand You (digital single) (arrangement and Japanese lyrics only; co-produced with Damian Kulash)
- Sarina
  - Violin Diva: 2nd Set (album)
    - Cyber Girl
- Scandal
  - Standard (album)
    - Overdrive (single) (as writer and co-arranger)
- Ringo Sheena
  - Ukina (compilation album)
    - Netsuai Hakkakuchū
- SMAP
  - Chan To Shi Nai To Ne (limited-run single)
  - Super Modern Artistic Performance (album)
    - Kokoro Puzzle Rhythm
  - Top of the World/Amazing Discovery (single)
    - Amazing Discovery
- Ami Suzuki
  - Free Free/Super Music Maker (single)
  - Supreme Show (album)
    - One (single)
    - Can't Stop the Disco (single)
- Tackey and Tsubasa
  - Trip & Treasure (EP)
    - Spotlight
- Tomohisa Yamashita
  - Asobi (EP)
    - Back to the Dancefloor
  - Ero (album)
    - Baby Baby
- Kenshi Yonezu
  - Nanimono (single)
- Shonan no Kaze
  - Ichibanka (EP)
- Daoko
  - Bokura no Network (single)
- Fruits Zipper
  - Sugarless Girl (cover)
  - Kawaii-tte Magic

=== Remixes ===
- Steve Aoki and Moxie Raia / I Love It When You Cry
- Thelma Aoyama / Rhythm (リズム)
- Clazziquai Project / Beat in Love
- Clazziquai Project / Kiss Kiss Kiss
- Leah Dizon / Koi Shiyo (恋しよう♪)
- Dorlis × Maki Nomiya × Yasutaka Nakata (capsule) featuring coba / Lovey Dovey
- Nana Furuhara - Futari no Mojipittan (ふたりのもじぴったん)
- Juju / Sayonara no Kawari ni
- Kaleido / Meu Sonho
- m-flo featuring BoA / the love bug
- m-flo Loves Minmi / Lotta Love
- Madeon featuring Passion Pit / Pay No Mind
- Meg / Freak
- Meg / rockstar
- Mini / Are U Ready?
- Kylie Minogue / Get Outta My Way
- Kylie Minogue / Into the Blue
- Passion Pit / "The Reeling"
- Ram Rider / Kimi ga Suki (きみがすき)
- Ram Rider / Sun Lights Stars
- Rip Slyme / Nettaiya
- SMAP / Yozora no Mukou (夜空ノムコウ)
- Spaghetti Vabune! / Favorite Song
- Alexandra Stan / Mr. Saxobeat
- Ami Suzuki / A token of love
- Sweetbox / Everything Is Gonna Be Alright (Next Generation 2009)
- Asako Toki - Kimi ni Mune Kyun (君に胸キュン)
- Tokyo Ska Paradise Orchestra / Ryuusei no Ballad
- TRF / Ez Do Dance (retracked by Yasutaka Nakata)
- Zedd and Alessia Cara / Stay
- Danny L Harle / Take My Heart Away

=== Other works ===
Nakata composed the station departure melody to be used on the Hokuriku Shinkansen platforms at Kanazawa Station in his hometown Kanazawa from March 2015. He has also contributed a composition that was featured in the Closing ceremony of the Rio 2016 Olympic Games titled "1620" which was produced to highlight Japan's electronic dance culture which also featured choreography from MIKIKO.

In 2025, he wrote the original soundtrack for the horror film Exit 8.

== Awards ==
Year	Ceremony	Award
2012	Japan Record Award	Arranger Award
2017	Japan Record Award	Arranger Award
