= Toshiko Koshijima =

Japanese singer (born 1980)

- Also known as: Koshiko [fan nickname] (こしこ) [written in Hiragana]
- Born: Toshiko Koshijima (越島稔子); March 3, 1980 (age 46); Kanazawa, Ishikawa, Japan
- Genres: J-pop; EDM; house; electropop; synth-pop; electronica; shibuya-kei
- Occupation: Singer
- Years active: 1997-present
- Labels: Contemode, Warner
- Website: www.capsule-official.com

Toshiko Koshijima (こしじま としこ, Koshijima Toshiko; born March 3, 1980 in Kanazawa, Ishikawa) is a Japanese singer. She is the lead vocalist of the electronica band Capsule, which she formed in 1997 with composer, record producer and DJ Yasutaka Nakata when they were both 17. Their formal debut came in 2001 with the release of the single "Sakura". Two more singles and their debut album, High Collar Girl, followed the same year.

Koshijima has worked exclusively as part of Capsule since the group's inception, acting as lead vocalist for all of the band's fifteen albums to date.
