= Capsule (band) =

Japanese electronica band

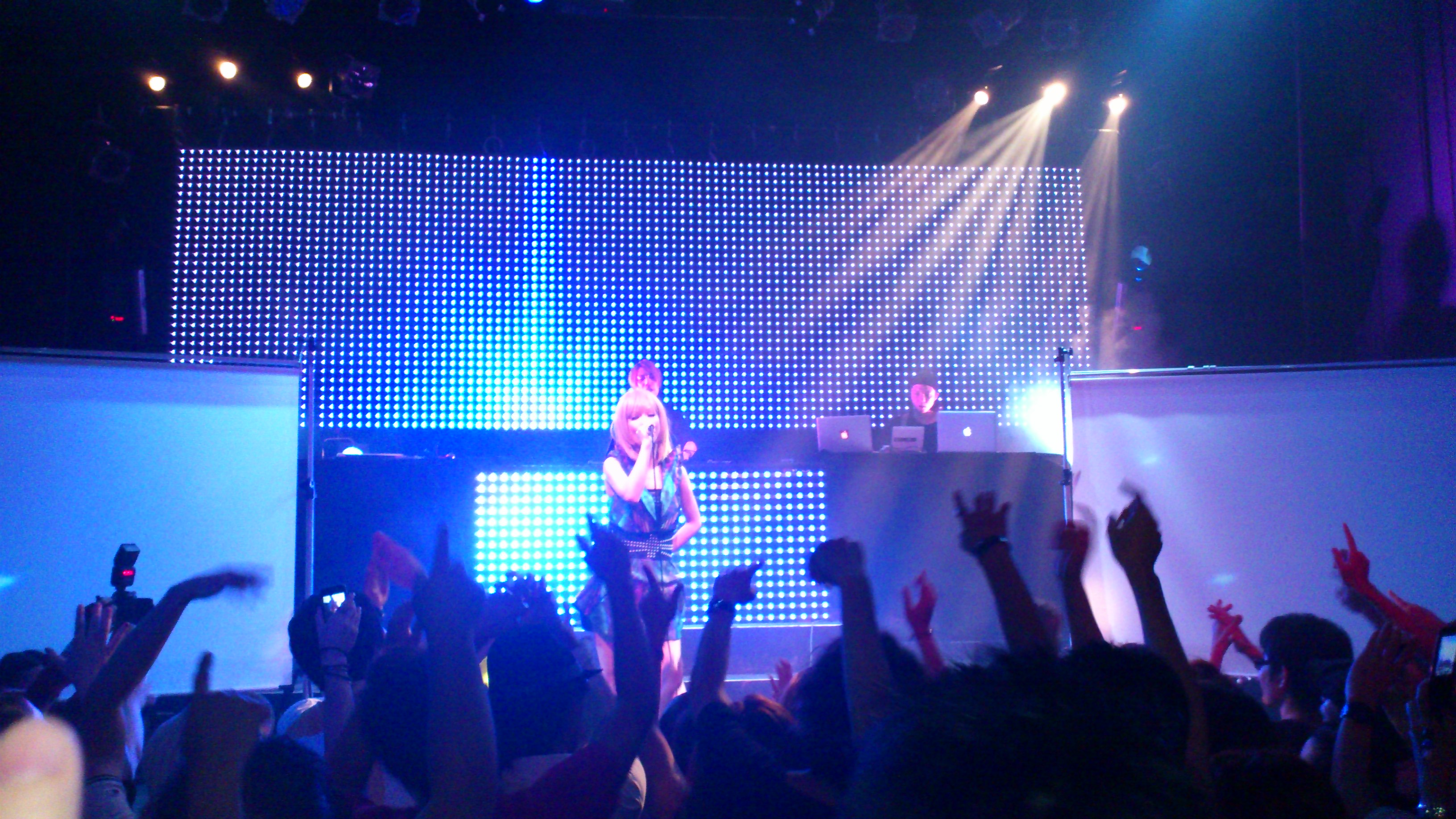
- Capsule performing in 2011

Background information
- Origin: Kanazawa, Japan
- Genres: J-pop; neo-Shibuya-kei; electro; house; synth-pop; EDM
- Years active: 1997–present
- Labels: Contemode (2003–2013); Yamaha Music Communications (2001–2013); Warner Music Japan (2013–present); Unborde (2013–2021)
- Members: Yasutaka Nakata; Toshiko Koshijima
- Website: http://capsule-official.com/

Capsule (カプセル, Kapuseru; stylized as capsule before 2013 and CAPSULE onward) is a Japanese electronica band consisting of producer Yasutaka Nakata and vocalist Toshiko Koshijima.

== Career ==
Capsule formed in November 1997, after Yasutaka Nakata and Toshiko Koshijima met at the Teens' Music Festival in the Hokuriku area convention when they were both 17 years old. Their first single was "Sakura", released in March 2001 on Yamaha Music Communications. Their first album, High Collar Girl, was significantly different from their later works in that it did not involve nearly as much use of synthesizers or contain futuristic/electronic sounds.

Capsule's style in albums up to L.D.K. Lounge Designers Killer (2005) was frequently referred to as "neo-Shibuya-kei" due to their stylistic similarities, both aesthetically and musically, to acts from the Shibuya-kei movement of the 1990s, most notably Pizzicato Five. It contained elements of bossa nova, lounge and breakbeat. From Fruits Clipper (2006) on their style was increasingly electro house.

Capsule is known for frequently licensing their music for use on television programs in Japan, such as Utawara Hot Hit 10, Hello! Morning, and Nankai Paradise. Yugo Nakamura's studio, Tha of Japan, used Capsule's music for promotional TV and web advertisements for KDDI. Their song Portable Airport (remix) is featured in promos for The Comedy Channel on Australian pay TV. The album More! More! More! ranked 6th in its first week on the Oricon weekly album chart, and ranked 3rd on the daily chart, marking their first time in the top 10.

On January 19, 2010, Capsule released "Love or Lies" which was used as an insert song for the show Liar Game Season 2 and the movie Liar Game: The Final Stage. It was included on their album, Player, which was released on March 3, 2010.

Their twelfth studio album, initially titled KILLER WAVE, was originally slated for a March 23, 2011, release. But following the 2011 Tōhoku earthquake and tsunami, the album title was changed to World of Fantasy and its release was postponed to May 25, 2011.

The band's fourteenth album, Caps Lock, was released on October 23, 2013. Their fifteenth album, Wave Runner, was released on February 18, 2015.

Capsule's first new song in six years, Hikari no Disco, was teased in April 2021 and was released on June 3, 2021. On October 25, 2022, Capsule announced their 16th studio album, titled Metro Pulse, which was released on December 14.

== Discography ==
=== Maxi singles ===
1. [2001.03.28] "Sakura" (さくら)
2. [2001.07.04] "Hanabi" (花火)
3. [2001.10.17] "Tokyo Kissa" (東京喫茶)
4. [2002.08.21] "Music Controller"
5. [2002.11.20] "Plastic Girl" (プラスチックガール)
6. [2003.05.21] "Candy Cutie" (キャンディー キューティー)
7. [2004.02.04] "Retro Memory" (レトロメモリー)

=== 12" vinyl singles ===
1. [2003.02.20] "Cutie Cinema Pre-Play"
2. [2003.05.21] "Tone Cooking"
3. [2003.09.17] "Idol Fancy"
4. [2004.05.21] "Portable Airport"
5. [2005.02.02] "Space Station No.9"
6. [2005.08.06] "Aeropolis"
7. [2006.04.19] "Jelly"
8. [2006.12.13] "Starry Sky"
9. [2007.09.05] "Capsule rmx EP"
10. [2007.11.07] "Musixxx / I'm Feeling You"
11. [2008.10.08] "Jumper"

=== Digital singles ===
1. [2005.05.02] cafe unice (CONTEMODE EXTENDED MIX)
2. [2007.02.21] Sugarless GiRL
3. [2008.11.19] more more more
4. [2008.11.19] the Time is Now
5. [2010.01.19] Love or Lies -LIAR GAME original ver-
6. [2010.03.03] Stay with You -LIAR GAME original ver-
7. [2011.02.09] WORLD OF FANTASY
8. [2012.02.01] Step on The Floor
9. [2013.10.16] CONTROL
10. [2014.12.29] Feel Again
11. [2015.01.28] Another World
12. [2015.02.10] Hero (extended mix)
13. [2015.02.10] White As Snow (extended mix)
14. [2021.06.04] Hikari no Disco (ひかりのディスコ)
15. [2021.06.24] Utsusemi (KNIGHTS OF SIDONIA Ai Tsumugu Hoshi) (Movie Version)
16. [2021.09.10] Future Wave (フューチャー・ウェイヴ)
17. [2021.12.10] Virtual Freedom (バーチャル・フリーダム)

=== Albums ===
1. [2001.11.21] High Collar Girl
2. [2003.03.19] Cutie Cinema Replay (2,106 copies sold)
3. [2003.11.19] phony phonic (3,501 copies sold)
4. [2004.06.09] S.F. sound furniture (12,172 copies sold)
5. [2005.02.09] Nexus-2060 (9,024 copies sold)
6. [2005.09.21] L.D.K. Lounge Designers Killer (10,707 copies sold)
7. [2006.05.10] Fruits Clipper (12,275 copies sold)
8. [2007.02.21] Sugarless Girl (23,324 copies sold)
9. [2007.12.05] Flash Back (37,915 copies sold)
10. [2008.11.19] More! More! More! (67,309 copies sold)
11. [2010.03.03] Player (47,853 copies sold)
12. [2011.05.25] World of Fantasy (previously Killer Wave; 25,000 copies sold)
13. [2012.03.07] Stereo Worxxx (24,000 copies sold)
14. [2013.10.23] Caps Lock (17,000 copies sold)
15. [2015.02.18] Wave Runner
16. [2022.12.14] Metro Pulse

=== Compilations ===
1. [2009.08.26] Flash Best (34,578 copies sold)
2. [2013.03.06] Rewind Best-1 (2012→2006) (6,000 copies sold)
3. [2013.03.06] Rewind Best-2 (2005→2001) (5,000 copies sold)

=== Remix albums ===
1. [2007.10.10] Capsule rmx (11,112 copies sold)
