= Contemode =

Japanese record label

contemode
- Parent company: Yamaha Music Communications
- Founded: 2003
- Founder: Nakata Yasutaka
- Defunct: 2013; 12 years ago
- Status: Defunct
- Distributor(s): Pony Canyon / Avex Trax (Japan); EMI Music Publishing / LOEN Entertainment (South Korea)
- Genre: Electronic, Shibuya-kei, Dance
- Country of origin: Japan

Contemode, stylized in all lowercase, was a Japanese record label founded by Yasutaka Nakata in 2003. The label was based in Shibuya, Tokyo and specialized in a variety of music styles including electropop, Shibuya-kei, lounge, dance, and hardcore house. Yamaha Music Communications, the music subsidiary of Yamaha, was its official parent company, while Pony Canyon (from 2003 to 2006) and Avex Trax (from 2006 to 2013) served as its distributors. In 2013, the label officially ceased operations.

== History ==
contemode was created in 2003 by Yasutaka Nakata to primarily serve as a label for capsule, an electro band he formed in 1997 with vocalist Toshiko Koshijima. Nakata had a significant amount of involvement with the artists who were signed to or worked in conjunction with his label, and described the music that came from contemode as an "accessory to fashion"; contemode artists' music was often sold in fashion boutiques located in Shibuya. Gradually over contemode's lifespan, fewer and fewer artists were signed to the label, until the point where the only remaining active artists were capsule and Nakata himself. In August 2013, Nakata moved to Japanese management company ASOBISYSTEM and Warner Music Japan's label unBORDE, rendering the sublabel defunct.

== Former Artists ==
- capsule (2003-2013)
  - Yasutaka Nakata (2003-2013)
- COLTEMONIKHA (2006-2011)
- COPTER4016882 (2004-2006)
- Nagisa Cosmetic (2004)

== See also ==
- List of record labels
