= List of Produce 101 Japan The Girls contestants =

Contestants of 2023 reality competition show

Produce 101 Japan: The Girls is the third season of the Japanese reality competition show Produce 101 Japan. 101 female trainees are competing to debut in an eleven-member girl group.

== Contestants ==
The spelling of the English names is in accordance with the official website. The names of the contestants are presented in Western order (given name, family name).

Color key

| Top 11 of the week |
| Left the show |
| Contestants eliminated in the first elimination round |
| Contestants eliminated in the second elimination round |
| Contestants eliminated in the third elimination round |
| Contestants eliminated in the finale |
| Final members of ME:I |

| Region | Audition Team Name | Name | Age (Note: As of Episode 1 (October 5, 2023).) | Evaluation | | | Ranking | | | | | | | | | | | |
| Region | Audition Team Name | Name | Age | Trainees | Judges | | Ep. 2 | Ep. 3 | Episode 5 | | Ep. 6 | Episode 8 | | Episode 10 | | Episode 11 | | Final |
| Region | Audition Team Name | Name | Age | Trainees | 1 | 2 | # | # | # | Votes | # | # | Votes | # | Votes | # | Votes | Final |
|---|---|---|---|---|---|---|---|---|---|---|---|---|---|---|---|---|---|---|
| Kanagawa | rebloom | Momona Kasahara (Note: Momona Kasahara was a member of the girl group Angerme.) (笠原 桃奈) | 19 | 8 | A | A | 4 | 2 | 1 | 1,768,859 | 3 | 3 | 1,982,944 | 1 | 650,828 | 1 | 1,116,716 | 1 |
| Okayama | Vitamin Bomb | Rinon Murakami (村上 璃杏) | 16 | 84 | B | B | 23 | 20 | 17 | 583,977 | 16 | 17 | 1,007,773 | 3 | 481,635 | 2 | 700,305 | 2 |
| Iwate | Cool Girls | Ayane Takami (高見 文寧) | 18 | 2 | A | B | 9 | 10 | 9 | 1,076,012 | 8 | 6 | 1,616,553 | 5 | 396,945 | 3 | 686,868 | 3 |
| Aichi | Wing Bell Moon (ウィング・ベル・ムーン) | Miu Sakurai (Note: Miu Sakurai was a contestant on Nizi Project.) (Note: Miyu Kanno, Miu Sakurai, and Ayaka Fujimoto were contestants on Girls Planet 999.) (櫻井 美羽) | 21 | 51 | A | A | 5 | 4 | 4 | 1,592,191 | 4 | 4 | 1,963,368 | 2 | 481,838 | 4 | 655,210 | 4 |
| Tokyo | Wing Bell Moon (ウィング・ベル・ムーン) | Suzu Yamamoto (山本 すず) | 16 | 15 | A | A | 1 | 3 | 5 | 1,572,508 | 5 | 5 | 1,719,091 | 14 | 218,904 | 5 | 631,708 | 5 |
| Mie | Team NANA (チーム NANA) | Kokona Sasaki (佐々木 心菜) | 17 | 86 | B | B | 6 | 6 | 7 | 1,414,136 | 10 | 11 | 1,435,067 | 7 | 341,153 | 6 | 599,913 | 6 |
| Tokyo | Little Heroines (リトルヒロイン) | Shizuku Iida (飯田 栞月) | 18 | 74 | D | C | 31 | 32 | 37 | 244,346 | 33 | 20 | 780,977 | 10 | 273,263 | 7 | 593,457 | 7 |
| Aichi | Vitamin Bomb | Keiko Shimizu (清水 恵子) | 17 | 9 | A | B | 18 | 12 | 12 | 841,591 | 11 | 8 | 1,513,323 | 11 | 265,607 | 8 | 591,650 | 8 |
| Saitama | EYE Catcher | Ran Ishii (Note: Ran Ishii was a member of the girl group Girls² and appeared in the Japanese drama Secret × Heroine Phantomirage!.) (石井 蘭) | 19 | 63 | B | A | 7 | 7 | 3 | 1,694,183 | 1 | 1 | 2,449,217 | 4 | 400,320 | 9 | 588,173 | 9 |
| Kanagawa | Blue Spring (アオハル) | Tsuzumi Ebihara (海老原 鼓) | 16 | 1 | A | A | 3 | 5 | 6 | 1,429,741 | 9 | 7 | 1,599,394 | 6 | 371,393 | 10 | 577,903 | 10 |
| Aichi | rebloom | Kokoro Kato (Note: Kokoro Kato was a member of the girl group Cherry Bullet.) (加藤 心) | 22 | 52 | A | A | 2 | 1 | 2 | 1,746,344 | 2 | 2 | 2,130,005 | 8 | 292,933 | 11 | 552,603 | 11 |
| Kanagawa | Remember me? | Rino Sakaguchi (Note: Rino Sakaguchi and Tsukushi Sasaki were contestants on iCON Z ~Dreams For Children~.) (坂口 梨乃) | 20 | 12 | B | A | 25 | 17 | 14 | 705,321 | 17 | 18 | 980,474 | 12 | 256,286 | 12 | Eliminated | 12 |
| Fukushima | Cool Girls | Rin Aita (Note: Rin Aita is a former model for Fukushima Bishoujo Zukan.) (会田 凛) | 17 | 82 | C | F | 32 | 35 | 11 | 916,711 | 7 | 10 | 1,439,966 | 9 | 283,766 | 13 | Eliminated | 13 |
| Osaka | MYDO GIRLS | Kagura Kato (加藤 神楽) | 18 | 94 | F | F | 10 | 16 | 24 | 484,925 | 37 | 32 | 454,416 | 20 | 164,123 | 14 | Eliminated | 14 |
| Kanagawa | High Queens | Yuuki Tanaka (田中 優希) | 19 | 17 | B | A | 21 | 24 | 26 | 443,280 | 20 | 19 | 787,688 | 16 | 210,065 | 15 | Eliminated | 15 |
| Niigata | Muse's Temptation (ミューズの誘惑) | Nano Kenmotsu (釼持 菜乃) | 22 | 40 | B | B | 14 | 8 | 8 | 1,305,332 | 6 | 9 | 1,463,867 | 15 | 213,005 | 16 | Eliminated | 16 |
| Aichi | Koto & Yui (コト＆ユイ) | Koto Tanaka (田中 琴) | 18 | 5 | C | A | 13 | 9 | 10 | 980,811 | 13 | 16 | 1,017,542 | 17 | 200,105 | 17 | Eliminated | 17 |
| Fukuoka | Fukuoka's Love (福岡のアイ) | Rio Kitazato (北里 理桜) | 19 | 77 | C | F | 8 | 11 | 15 | 691,836 | 22 | 24 | 598,862 | 18 | 191,943 | 18 | Eliminated | 18 |
| Kanagawa | Cool Girls | Haruka Sakuraba (桜庭 遥花) | 17 | 89 | F | F | 34 | 36 | 42 | 224,047 | 32 | 33 | 451,639 | 19 | 175,250 | 19 | Eliminated | 19 |
| Tokyo | EYE Catcher | Momoka Takabatake (髙畠 百加) | 19 | 14 | C | B | 36 | 33 | 32 | 319,104 | 15 | 13 | 1,117,872 | 13 | 219,063 | 20 | Eliminated | 20 |
| Osaka | Team NANA (チーム NANA) | Serina Saito (斉藤 芹菜) | 17 | 48 | C | D | 17 | 21 | 23 | 505,538 | 23 | 26 | 575,671 | 21 | Eliminated | | | 21 |
| Tokyo | Beginners (ビギナーズ) | Joa Aramaki (荒牧 深愛) | 18 | 37 | B | A | 12 | 18 | 20 | 559,593 | 26 | 22 | 709,975 | 22 | Eliminated | | | 22 |
| Kanagawa | Team Maknae (チームマンネ) | Nagomi Abe (Note: Ema Akiyama, Nagomi Abe, Hana Iyota, Mimi Ueki, Sara Ota, Rena Suzuki, Kokona Nakano, and Fuka Bando attended NEXTinDANCE Academy.) (阿部 和) | 16 | 27 | C | C | 15 | 14 | 13 | 791,264 | 14 | 15 | 1,021,459 | 23 | Eliminated | | | 23 |
| Osaka | MYDO GIRLS | Ayano Kamio (神尾 彩乃) | 17 | 52 | D | C | 29 | 31 | 27 | 423,477 | 21 | 23 | 644,575 | 24 | Eliminated | | | 24 |
| Aichi | Koto & Yui (コト＆ユイ) | Yui Ando (安藤 佑唯) | 18 | 20 | C | B | 20 | 25 | 21 | 558,630 | 18 | 14 | 1,043,200 | 25 | Eliminated | | | 25 |
| Saitama | Team Maknae (チームマンネ) | Hina Takahashi (髙橋 妃那) | 15 | 35 | C | C | 28 | 26 | 25 | 464,467 | 12 | 12 | 1,164,150 | 26 | Eliminated | | | 26 |
| Iwate | Remember me? | Tsukushi Sasaki (Note: Tsukushi Sasaki was a member of the dance team FabulousSisters.) (佐々木 つくし) | 17 | 63 | A | A | 22 | 19 | 18 | 582,955 | 31 | 28 | 500,734 | 27 | Eliminated | | | 27 |
| Gunma | Pocket Princess (ポケプリ) | Sakura Kitazume (北爪 さくら) | 19 | 16 | B | C | 11 | 15 | 22 | 524,879 | 19 | 21 | 752,347 | 28 | Eliminated | | | 28 |
| Ishikawa | DD-crash | Miyu Matsushita (松下 実夢) | 23 | 4 | B | B | 59 | 55 | 31 | 351,821 | 25 | 27 | 565,498 | 29 | Eliminated | | | 29 |
| Nara | Little Heroines (リトルヒロイン) | Hana Yoshida (吉田 花夏) | 17 | 25 | B | C | 48 | 44 | 33 | 283,514 | 27 | 35 | 434,070 | 30 | Eliminated | | | 30 |
| Hyogo | Maiden Era (乙女時代) | Mena Hatta (八田 芽奈) | 17 | 19 | B | A | 27 | 22 | 16 | 624,175 | 24 | 29 | 490,688 | 31 | Eliminated | | | 31 |
| Hyogo | Maiden Era (乙女時代) | Yurara Sutani (須谷 緩) | 18 | 65 | B | C | 38 | 39 | 43 | 213,318 | 36 | 34 | 438,801 | 32 | Eliminated | | | 32 |
| Aichi | Apple Mint (アップルミント) | Ranka Kawabata (川畑 蘭華) | 17 | 30 | B | F | 41 | 48 | 47 | 177,397 | 28 | 25 | 579,865 | 33 | Eliminated | | | 33 |
| Osaka | Wing Bell Moon (ウィング・ベル・ムーン) | Hazuki Hidaka (日髙 葉月) | 16 | 73 | C | F | 37 | 40 | 40 | 228,267 | 30 | 30 | 469,162 | 34 | Eliminated | | | 34 |
| Tokyo | Little Heroines (リトルヒロイン) | Kokona Nakano (中野 心結) | 16 | 11 | B | B | 16 | 13 | 19 | 567,839 | 29 | 31 | 459,303 | 35 | Eliminated | | | 35 |
| Kyoto | MYDO GIRLS | Kotone Sakata (坂田 琴音) | 20 | 24 | F | B | 56 | 30 | 28 | 382,625 | 34 | 36 | Eliminated | | | | | 36 |
| Osaka | DD-crash | Ayano Yoshida (Note: Ayano Yoshida was a contestant on GENIC.) (吉田 彩乃) | 21 | 61 | B | C | 53 | 51 | 45 | 183,579 | 41 | 37 | Eliminated | | | | | 37 |
| Kanagawa | MISS JAPAN Representatives (MISS JAPAN 代表) | Mana Koyama (Note: Mana Koyama took part in the 2021 Miss Japan Grand Prix.) (小山 麻菜) | 25 | 90 | F | D | 44 | 42 | 49 | 171,105 | 40 | 38 | Eliminated | | | | | 38 |
| Tokyo | Lemon Squash (レモン・スカッシュ) | Rin Uchiyama (内山 凜) | 15 | 57 | C | C | 74 | 73 | 46 | 177,499 | 35 | 39 | Eliminated | | | | | 39 |
| Fukuoka | Fukuoka's Love (福岡のアイ) | Karen Otsubo (大坪 楓恋) | 18 | 22 | B | B | 54 | 49 | 50 | 167,937 | 38 | 40 | Eliminated | | | | | 40 |
| Tokyo | Muse's Temptation (ミューズの誘惑) | Ema Akiyama (秋山 愛) | 20 | 55 | C | B | 35 | 38 | 35 | 256,294 | 43 | 41 | Eliminated | | | | | 41 |
| Chiba | Pocket Princess (ポケプリ) | Mayu Takagi (髙木 舞優) | 20 | 100 | D | F | 19 | 23 | 30 | 361,341 | 45 | 42 | Eliminated | | | | | 42 |
| Fukuoka | Fukuoka's Love (福岡のアイ) | Rimika Mizukami (Note: Rimika Mizukami was a member of the girl group HKT48.) (水上 凜巳花) | 20 | 67 | B | D | 26 | 28 | 34 | 275,667 | 44 | 43 | Eliminated | | | | | 43 |
| Fukuoka | MISS JAPAN Representatives (MISS JAPAN 代表) | Chiharu Ando (Note: Chiharu Ando, Jueri Sano, and Ayaka Fujimoto attended Bloom Academy.) (安藤 千陽) | 19 | 62 | D | D | 43 | 43 | 38 | 236,395 | 39 | 44 | Eliminated | | | | | 44 |
| Saitama | Remember me? | Ayaka Fujimoto (藤本 彩花) | 22 | 10 | C | F | 45 | 54 | 36 | 250,666 | 42 | 45 | Eliminated | | | | | 45 |
| Tokyo | Little Heroines (リトルヒロイン) | Mitsuki Yamazaki (Note: Mitsuki Yamazaki was a member of Crown Pop.) (山崎 美月) | 22 | 78 | D | F | 24 | 29 | 41 | 227,553 | 47 | 46 | Eliminated | | | | | 46 |
| Kagawa | Remember me? | Miyu Kanno (菅野 美優) | 21 | 17 | C | C | 47 | 52 | 48 | 171,390 | 46 | 47 | Eliminated | | | | | 47 |
| Fukuoka | Twinkle | Kotone Nakamori (中森 琴音) | 21 | 43 | A | B | 49 | 34 | 39 | 236,383 | 49 | 48 | Eliminated | | | | | 48 |
| Fukuoka | DD-crash | Sakura Sudo (須藤 紗暮) | 20 | 21 | A | A | 30 | 27 | 29 | 380,737 | 48 | 49 | Eliminated | | | | | 49 |
| Fukuoka | Twinkle | Mikoto Nakamori (Note: Mikoto Nakamori was a contestant on OUT OF 48.) (中森 美琴) | 21 | 65 | A | B | 52 | 37 | 44 | 208,178 | 50 | 50 | Eliminated | | | | | 50 |
| Miyazaki | Blue Spring (アオハル) | Misaki Yamaguchi (山口 愛咲) | 15 | 88 | D | C | 90 | 84 | 51 | Eliminated | | | | | | | | 51 |
| Chiba | Blue Spring (アオハル) | Shion Mogi (茂木 詩音) | 16 | 29 | C | F | 46 | 50 | 52 | Eliminated | | | | | | | | 52 |
| Tokyo | G-TRIANGLE | Aruha Oda (小田 有葉) | 21 | 3 | A | D | 33 | 41 | 53 | Eliminated | | | | | | | | 53 |
| Hyogo | MYDO GIRLS | Miyu Watanabe (Note: Miyu Watanabe was a member of the girl group Lovely² and appeared in Police × Heroine Lovepatrina!) (渡辺 未優) | 16 | 69 | D | C | 42 | 47 | 54 | Eliminated | | | | | | | | 54 |
| Tokushima | Remember me? | Honoka Kurokawa (Note: Honoka Kurokawa was a contestant on Who Is Princess?.) (黒川 穂香) | 18 | 32 | B | C | 78 | 60 | 55 | Eliminated | | | | | | | | 55 |
| Miyagi | Cool Girls | Rio Oikawa (及川 里桜) | 17 | 97 | F | F | 39 | 46 | 56 | Eliminated | | | | | | | | 56 |
| Tokyo | Blue Spring (アオハル) | Rena Suzuki (鈴木 玲名) | 17 | 39 | B | D | 40 | 45 | 57 | Eliminated | | | | | | | | 57 |
| Osaka | Muse's Temptation (ミューズの誘惑) | Moe Kamada (鎌田 萌) | 19 | 13 | C | B | 89 | 72 | 58 | Eliminated | | | | | | | | 58 |
| Saitama | Beginners (ビギナーズ) | Kano Kurihara (栗原 果乃) | 18 | 75 | D | D | 95 | 93 | 59 | Eliminated | | | | | | | | 59 |
| Tokyo | Vitamin Bomb | Fuka Bando (坂東 楓夏) | 19 | 34 | D | D | 67 | 59 | 60 | Eliminated | | | | | | | | 60 |
| Fukuoka | EYE Catcher | Aki Kikukawa (菊川 亜樹) | 22 | 7 | D | D | 50 | 53 | 61 | Eliminated | | | | | | | | 61 |
| Fukuoka | Fukuoka's Love (福岡のアイ) | Aiko Hamasaki (濵嵜 愛子) | 19 | 96 | C | C | 57 | 56 | 62 | Eliminated | | | | | | | | 62 |
| Kanagawa | Blue Spring (アオハル) | Mimi Ueki (植木 美々) | 15 | 99 | C | F | 51 | 57 | 63 | Eliminated | | | | | | | | 63 |
| Saitama | Blue Spring (アオハル) | Nana Tabata (田端 那菜) | 17 | 33 | B | B | 65 | 62 | 64 | Eliminated | | | | | | | | 64 |
| Chiba | Pocket Princess (ポケプリ) | Ayaka Hosoi (細井 彩加) | 21 | 72 | C | D | 55 | 58 | 65 | Eliminated | | | | | | | | 65 |
| Hiroshima | Apple Mint (アップルミント) | Karin Tanabe (田邊 果凜) | 20 | 28 | B | C | 62 | 65 | 66 | Eliminated | | | | | | | | 66 |
| Hokkaido | Cool Girls | Nana Okamura (岡村 菜那) | 18 | 80 | C | C | 58 | 61 | 67 | Eliminated | | | | | | | | 67 |
| Kumamoto | Lemon Squash (レモン・スカッシュ) | Maho Shiromaru (城丸 真歩) | 18 | 50 | C | B | 60 | 63 | 68 | Eliminated | | | | | | | | 68 |
| Kyoto | Pocket Princess (ポケプリ) | Nonoka Okabe (岡部 望々花) | 18 | 38 | C | F | 73 | 81 | 69 | Eliminated | | | | | | | | 69 |
| Osaka | MYDO GIRLS | Hana Tanaka (田中 花) | 15 | 45 | F | F | 68 | 71 | 70 | Eliminated | | | | | | | | 70 |
| Tokyo | Yummy's | Hana Iyota (井餘田 華) | 16 | 6 | D | D | 63 | 64 | 71 | Eliminated | | | | | | | | 71 |
| Okayama | Beginners (ビギナーズ) | Mihaya Wakimoto (脇本 美颯) | 17 | 75 | C | F | 69 | 70 | 72 | Eliminated | | | | | | | | 72 |
| Indonesia | G-TRIANGLE | Emi Oyanagi (小栁 絵美) | 19 | 68 | D | F | 61 | 66 | 73 | Eliminated | | | | | | | | 73 |
| Tokyo | Maiden Era (乙女時代) | Anon Moro (茂呂 空音) | 20 | 40 | F | F | 77 | 78 | 74 | Eliminated | | | | | | | | 74 |
| Hyogo | MYDO GIRLS | Mei Shibuya (渋谷 芽衣) | 17 | 23 | D | F | 71 | 74 | 75 | Eliminated | | | | | | | | 75 |
| Nagano | Beginners (ビギナーズ) | Aoi Nakamura (中村 葵) | 17 | 95 | F | F | 81 | 92 | 76 | Eliminated | | | | | | | | 76 |
| Tokyo | Lemon Squash (レモン・スカッシュ) | Runa Kawagishi (川岸 瑠那) | 22 | 54 | C | C | 66 | 68 | 77 | Eliminated | | | | | | | | 77 |
| Aichi | Little Heroines (リトルヒロイン) | Honoka Nakayama (中山 穗乃楓) | 20 | 58 | C | D | 84 | 88 | 78 | Eliminated | | | | | | | | 78 |
| United States | G-TRIANGLE | Ameli Sato (佐藤 あめり) | 19 | 71 | D | D | 64 | 67 | 79 | Eliminated | | | | | | | | 79 |
| Tokyo | Yummy's | Konomi Kato (加藤 好実) | 18 | 42 | D | C | 82 | 94 | 80 | Eliminated | | | | | | | | 80 |
| Tochigi | Swans | Yuka Aoki (青木 友香) | 19 | 44 | D | C | 72 | 75 | 81 | Eliminated | | | | | | | | 81 |
| Osaka | Yummy's | Rio Kataoka (片岡 陽音) | 19 | 47 | D | B | 70 | 69 | 82 | Eliminated | | | | | | | | 82 |
| Kanagawa | Apple Mint (アップルミント) | Rikako Sekiguchi (関口 理香子) | 15 | 46 | D | D | 83 | 96 | 83 | Eliminated | | | | | | | | 83 |
| Kyoto | Lemon Squash (レモン・スカッシュ) | Riko Kino (木野 稟子) | 17 | 59 | C | B | 76 | 76 | 84 | Eliminated | | | | | | | | 84 |
| Niigata | Cool Girls | Mika Shinzawa (新澤 実華) | 18 | 98 | D | F | 86 | 95 | 85 | Eliminated | | | | | | | | 85 |
| Okayama | Apple Mint (アップルミント) | Miu Tabuchi (田淵 美優) | 19 | 86 | D | F | 91 | 82 | 86 | Eliminated | | | | | | | | 86 |
| Chiba | Pocket Princess (ポケプリ) | Meika Motohashi (本橋 明桜) | 17 | 69 | D | F | 80 | 87 | 87 | Eliminated | | | | | | | | 87 |
| Saitama | Swans | Natsuho Sugai (菅井 夏帆) | 20 | 91 | F | D | 87 | 91 | 88 | Eliminated | | | | | | | | 88 |
| Osaka | Yummy's | Riro Nakamura (中村 璃彩) | 18 | 35 | D | B | 93 | 89 | 89 | Eliminated | | | | | | | | 89 |
| Kanagawa | Swans | Sara Ota (太田 紗蘭) | 18 | 49 | F | D | 94 | 90 | 90 | Eliminated | | | | | | | | 90 |
| Tokyo | Maiden Era (乙女時代) | Airi Kato (加藤 愛梨) | 19 | 83 | F | C | 88 | 79 | 91 | Eliminated | | | | | | | | 91 |
| Tokyo | High Queens | Jueri Sano (佐野 じゅえり) | 20 | 30 | C | D | 92 | 77 | 92 | Eliminated | | | | | | | | 92 |
| Chiba | Muse's Temptation (ミューズの誘惑) | Sayaka Furuhashi (古橋 沙也佳) | 21 | 79 | D | D | 75 | 80 | 93 | Eliminated | | | | | | | | 93 |
| Saitama | Maiden Era (乙女時代) | Seia Tani (谷 聖彩) | 16 | 92 | F | D | 85 | 83 | 94 | Eliminated | | | | | | | | 94 |
| Kanagawa | Beginners (ビギナーズ) | Sae Kobayashi (小林 さえ) | 18 | 56 | C | D | 79 | 85 | 95 | Eliminated | | | | | | | | 95 |
| Aichi | EYE Catcher | Arisa Shibagaki (柴垣 有佐) | 17 | 81 | D | D | 96 | 86 | 96 | Eliminated | | | | | | | | 96 |
| N/A | EYE Catcher | Yuna Andoh (安藤 ゆうな) | 17 | 59 | C | Left The Show | | | | | | | | | | | | 97 |
| N/A | Apple Mint (アップルミント) | Niko Gogami (後上 仁胡) | N/A | 85 | N/A | Left The Show | | | | | | | | | | | | |
| N/A | Apple Mint (アップルミント) | Ameri Shiratori (白取 天莉) | N/A | 26 | N/A | Left The Show | | | | | | | | | | | | |

Prior to Produce 101 Japan The Girls

== Trainee Evaluation Ranking (Episode 1) ==
Prior to the Level Placement Test, the trainees evaluated each other based on their skill level and were then ranked accordingly.

Trainee Evaluation Ranking
| Rank | Contestants | Rank | Contestants | Rank | Contestants |
|---|---|---|---|---|---|
| 1 | Tsuzumi Ebihara | 35 | Hina Takahashi; Riro Nakamura | 69 | Miyu Watanabe; Meika Motohashi |
| 2 | Ayane Takami | 36 | —N/a (Note: Hina Takahashi and Riro Nakamura both ranked 35th, hence why there is no 36th place.) | 70 | —N/a (Note: Miyu Watanabe and Meika Motohashi both ranked 69th, hence why there is no 70th place.) |
| 3 | Aruha Oda | 37 | Joa Aramaki | 71 | Ameli Sato |
| 4 | Miyu Matsushita | 38 | Nonoka Okabe | 72 | Ayaka Hosoi |
| 5 | Koto Tanaka | 39 | Rena Suzuki | 73 | Hazuki Hidaka |
| 6 | Hana Iyota | 40 | Nano Kenmotsu; Anon Moro | 74 | Shizuku Iida |
| 7 | Aki Kikukawa | 41 | —N/a (Note: Nano Kenmotsu and Anon Moro both ranked 40th, hence why there is no 41st place.) | 75 | Mihaya Wakimoto; Kano Kurihara |
| 8 | Momona Kasahara | 42 | Konomi Kato | 76 | —N/a (Note: Mihaya Wakimoto and Kano Kurihara both ranked 75th, hence why there is no 76th place.) |
| 9 | Keiko Shimizu | 43 | Kotone Nakamori | 77 | Rio Kitazato |
| 10 | Ayaka Fujimoto | 44 | Yuka Aoki | 78 | Mitsuki Yamazaki |
| 11 | Kokona Nakano | 45 | Hana Tanaka | 79 | Sayaka Furuhashi |
| 12 | Rino Sakaguchi | 46 | Rikako Sekiguchi | 80 | Nana Okamura |
| 13 | Moe Kamada | 47 | Rio Kataoka | 81 | Arisa Shibagaki |
| 14 | Momoka Takabatake | 48 | Serina Saito | 82 | Rin Aita |
| 15 | Suzu Yamamoto | 49 | Sara Ota | 83 | Airi Kato |
| 16 | Sakura Kitazume | 50 | Maho Shiromaru | 84 | Rinon Murakami |
| 17 | Yuuki Tanaka; Miyu Kanno | 51 | Miu Sakurai | 85 | Niko Gogami (Contestant left) |
| 18 | —N/a (Note: Yuuki Tanaka and Miyu Kanno both ranked 17th, hence why there is no 18th place.) | 52 | Kokoro Kato; Ayano Kamio | 86 | Kokona Sasaki; Miu Tabuchi |
| 19 | Mena Hatta | 53 | —N/a (Note: Kokoro Kato and Ayano Kamio both ranked 52nd, hence why there is no 53rd place.) | 87 | —N/a (Note: Kokona Sasaki and Miu Tabuchi both ranked 86th, hence why there is no 87th place.) |
| 20 | Yui Ando | 54 | Runa Kawagishi | 88 | Misaki Yamaguchi |
| 21 | Sakura Sudo | 55 | Ema Akiyama | 89 | Haruka Sakuraba |
| 22 | Karen Otsubo | 56 | Sae Kobayashi | 90 | Mana Koyama |
| 23 | Mei Shibuya | 57 | Rin Uchiyama | 91 | Natsuho Sugai |
| 24 | Kotone Sakata | 58 | Honoka Nakayama | 92 | Seia Tani |
| 25 | Hana Yoshida | 59 | Riko Kino; Yūna Ando (Contestant left) | 93 | Contestant left |
| 26 | Ameri Shiratori (Contestant left) | 60 | —N/a (Note: Riko Kino and a contestant that left the show both ranked 59th, hence why there is no 60th place.) | 94 | Kagura Kato |
| 27 | Nagomi Abe | 61 | Ayano Yoshida | 95 | Aoi Nakamura |
| 28 | Karin Tanabe | 62 | Chiharu Ando | 96 | Aiko Hamasaki |
| 29 | Shion Mogi | 63 | Ran Ishii; Tsukushi Sasaki | 97 | Rio Oikawa |
| 30 | Ranka Kawabata; Jueri Sano | 64 | —N/a (Note: Ran Ishii and Tsukushi Sasaki both ranked 63rd, hence why there is no 64th place.) | 98 | Mika Shinzawa |
| 31 | —N/a (Note: Ranka Kawabata and Jueri Sano both ranked 30th, hence why there is no 31st place.) | 65 | Yurara Sutani; Mikoto Nakamori | 99 | Mimi Ueki |
| 32 | Honoka Kurokawa | 66 | —N/a (Note: Yurara Sutani and Mikoto Nakamori both ranked 65th, hence why there is no 66th place.) | 100 | Mayu Takagi |
| 33 | Nana Tabata | 67 | Rimika Mizukami | | |
| 34 | Fuka Bando | 68 | Emi Oyanagi | | |

== Level Placement Test (Episode 1–2) ==
The Level Placement Test (Japanese: レベル分けテスト, Hepburn: Reberu Wake Tesuto) involves the contestants performing in teams and getting their individual performance evaluated by the trainers on a scale from A (best) to F (worst).

Bold team numbers are teams whose performances were partially or entirely unaired on broadcast.

Level Division Test (1st evaluation results)
| Performance | | | Team | Contestant | Grade | Performance | | | Team | Contestant | Grade |
| # | Original artist(s) | Song | Team | Contestant | Grade | # | Original artist(s) | Song | Team | Contestant | Grade |
| Episode 1 | | | | | | Episode 2 | | | | | |
|---|---|---|---|---|---|---|---|---|---|---|---|
| 1 | Sekai no Owari | "Habit" | Team Maknae (チームマンネ) | Nagomi Abe | C | 15 | (G)I-dle | "Latata" | Remember me? | Miyu Kanno | C |
| 1 | Sekai no Owari | "Habit" | Team Maknae (チームマンネ) | Hina Takahashi | C | 15 | (G)I-dle | "Latata" | Remember me? | Honoka Kurokawa | B |
| 2 | Hikaru Utada | "Automatic" | Koto & Yui (コト＆ユイ) | Yui Ando | C | 15 | (G)I-dle | "Latata" | Remember me? | Rino Sakaguchi | B |
| 2 | Hikaru Utada | "Automatic" | Koto & Yui (コト＆ユイ) | Koto Tanaka | C | 15 | (G)I-dle | "Latata" | Remember me? | Tsukushi Sasaki | A |
| 3 | Kep1er | "Wing Wing" | Beginners (ビギナーズ) | Joa Aramaki | B | 15 | (G)I-dle | "Latata" | Remember me? | Ayaka Fujimoto | C |
| 3 | Kep1er | "Wing Wing" | Beginners (ビギナーズ) | Kano Kurihara | D | 16 | Girls' Generation | "Gee" | Maiden Era (乙女時代) | Airi Kato | F |
| 3 | Kep1er | "Wing Wing" | Beginners (ビギナーズ) | Sae Kobayashi | C | 16 | Girls' Generation | "Gee" | Maiden Era (乙女時代) | Yurara Sutani | B |
| 3 | Kep1er | "Wing Wing" | Beginners (ビギナーズ) | Aoi Nakamura | F | 16 | Girls' Generation | "Gee" | Maiden Era (乙女時代) | Seia Tani | F |
| 3 | Kep1er | "Wing Wing" | Beginners (ビギナーズ) | Mihaya Wakimoto | C | 16 | Girls' Generation | "Gee" | Maiden Era (乙女時代) | Mena Hatta | B |
| 4 | Twice | "One More Time" | Pocket Princess (ポケプリ) | Nonoka Okabe | C | 16 | Girls' Generation | "Gee" | Maiden Era (乙女時代) | Anon Moro | F |
| 4 | Twice | "One More Time" | Pocket Princess (ポケプリ) | Sakura Kitazume | B | 17 | Nogizaka46 | "Influencer" | Lemon Squash (レモン・スカッシュ) | Rin Uchiyama | C |
| 4 | Twice | "One More Time" | Pocket Princess (ポケプリ) | Mayu Takagi | D | 17 | Nogizaka46 | "Influencer" | Lemon Squash (レモン・スカッシュ) | Runa Kawagishi | C |
| 4 | Twice | "One More Time" | Pocket Princess (ポケプリ) | Ayaka Hosoi | C | 17 | Nogizaka46 | "Influencer" | Lemon Squash (レモン・スカッシュ) | Riko Kino | C |
| 4 | Twice | "One More Time" | Pocket Princess (ポケプリ) | Meika Motohashi | D | 17 | Nogizaka46 | "Influencer" | Lemon Squash (レモン・スカッシュ) | Maho Shiromaru | C |
| 5 | INI | "We Are" | MYDO GIRLS | Kagura Kato | F | 18 | Da-ice | "Citrus" | Little Heroines (リトルヒロイン) | Shizuku Iida | D |
| 5 | INI | "We Are" | MYDO GIRLS | Ayano Kamio | D | 18 | Da-ice | "Citrus" | Little Heroines (リトルヒロイン) | Kokona Nakano | B |
| 5 | INI | "We Are" | MYDO GIRLS | Kotone Sakata | F | 18 | Da-ice | "Citrus" | Little Heroines (リトルヒロイン) | Honoka Nakayama | C |
| 5 | INI | "We Are" | MYDO GIRLS | Mei Shibuya | D | 18 | Da-ice | "Citrus" | Little Heroines (リトルヒロイン) | Mitsuki Yamazaki | D |
| 5 | INI | "We Are" | MYDO GIRLS | Hana Tanaka | F | 18 | Da-ice | "Citrus" | Little Heroines (リトルヒロイン) | Hana Yoshida | B |
| 5 | INI | "We Are" | MYDO GIRLS | Miyu Watanabe | D | 19 | Atarashii Gakko! | "Otonablue" ("オトナブルー") | Vitamin Bomb | Keiko Shimizu | A |
| 6 | KARA | "Go Go Summer!" (GO GO サマー!) | Yummy's | Hana Iyota | D | 19 | Atarashii Gakko! | "Otonablue" ("オトナブルー") | Vitamin Bomb | Fuka Bando | D |
| 6 | KARA | "Go Go Summer!" (GO GO サマー!) | Yummy's | Rio Kataoka | D | 19 | Atarashii Gakko! | "Otonablue" ("オトナブルー") | Vitamin Bomb | Rinon Murakami | B |
| 6 | KARA | "Go Go Summer!" (GO GO サマー!) | Yummy's | Konomi Kato | D | 20 | Awich | "Dore ni Shiyokana (I Got Options)" (どれにしようかな) | High Queens | Jueri Sano | C |
| 6 | KARA | "Go Go Summer!" (GO GO サマー!) | Yummy's | Riro Nakamura | D | 20 | Awich | "Dore ni Shiyokana (I Got Options)" (どれにしようかな) | High Queens | Yuuki Tanaka | B |
| 7 | Keyakizaka46 | "Fukyōwaon" | Apple Mint (アップルミント) | Rikako Sekiguchi | D | 21 | Koda Kumi | "Cutie Honey" (キューティーハニー) | Muse's Temptation (ミューズの誘惑) | Ema Akiyama | C |
| 7 | Keyakizaka46 | "Fukyōwaon" | Apple Mint (アップルミント) | Ranka Kawabata | B | 21 | Koda Kumi | "Cutie Honey" (キューティーハニー) | Muse's Temptation (ミューズの誘惑) | Moe Kamada | C |
| 7 | Keyakizaka46 | "Fukyōwaon" | Apple Mint (アップルミント) | Karin Tanabe | B | 21 | Koda Kumi | "Cutie Honey" (キューティーハニー) | Muse's Temptation (ミューズの誘惑) | Nano Kenmotsu | B |
| 7 | Keyakizaka46 | "Fukyōwaon" | Apple Mint (アップルミント) | Miu Tabuchi | D | 21 | Koda Kumi | "Cutie Honey" (キューティーハニー) | Muse's Temptation (ミューズの誘惑) | Sayaka Furuhashi | D |
| 8 | Ayumi Hamasaki | "Blue Bird" | MISS JAPAN Representatives (MISS JAPAN 代表) | Chiharu Ando | D | 22 | Namie Amuro | "Chase the Chance" | DD-crash | Sakura Sudo | A |
| 8 | Ayumi Hamasaki | "Blue Bird" | MISS JAPAN Representatives (MISS JAPAN 代表) | Mana Koyama | F | 22 | Namie Amuro | "Chase the Chance" | DD-crash | Miyu Matsushita | B |
| 9 | Perfume | "FLASH" | Team NANA (チーム NANA) | Serina Saito | C | 22 | Namie Amuro | "Chase the Chance" | DD-crash | Ayano Yoshida | B |
| 9 | Perfume | "FLASH" | Team NANA (チーム NANA) | Kokona Sasaki | B | 23 | E-girls | "Follow Me" | Twinkle | Kotone Nakamori | A |
| 10 | Itzy | "Wannabe" | Blue Spring (アオハル) | Mimi Ueki | C | 23 | E-girls | "Follow Me" | Twinkle | Mikoto Nakamori | A |
| 10 | Itzy | "Wannabe" | Blue Spring (アオハル) | Tsuzumi Ebihara | A | 24 | IVE | "Eleven" | Fukuoka's Love (福岡のアイ) | Karen Otsubo | B |
| 10 | Itzy | "Wannabe" | Blue Spring (アオハル) | Rena Suzuki | B | 24 | IVE | "Eleven" | Fukuoka's Love (福岡のアイ) | Rio Kitazato | C |
| 10 | Itzy | "Wannabe" | Blue Spring (アオハル) | Nana Tabata | B | 24 | IVE | "Eleven" | Fukuoka's Love (福岡のアイ) | Aiko Hamasaki | C |
| 10 | Itzy | "Wannabe" | Blue Spring (アオハル) | Shion Mogi | C | 24 | IVE | "Eleven" | Fukuoka's Love (福岡のアイ) | Rimika Mizukami | B |
| 10 | Itzy | "Wannabe" | Blue Spring (アオハル) | Misaki Yamaguchi | D | 25 | JO1 | "Tiger" | EYE Catcher | Ran Ishii | B |
| 11 | Kaela Kimura | "Butterfly" | Swans | Yuka Aoki | D | 25 | JO1 | "Tiger" | EYE Catcher | Aki Kikukawa | D |
| 11 | Kaela Kimura | "Butterfly" | Swans | Sara Ota | F | 25 | JO1 | "Tiger" | EYE Catcher | Arisa Shibagaki | D |
| 11 | Kaela Kimura | "Butterfly" | Swans | Natsuho Sugai | F | 25 | JO1 | "Tiger" | EYE Catcher | Momoka Takabatake | C |
| 12 | Aespa | "Spicy" | Wing Bell Moon (ウィング・ベル・ムーン) | Miu Sakurai | A | 26 | Yoasobi | "Idol" (アイドル) | rebloom | Momona Kasahara | A |
| 12 | Aespa | "Spicy" | Wing Bell Moon (ウィング・ベル・ムーン) | Hazuki Hidaka | C | 26 | Yoasobi | "Idol" (アイドル) | rebloom | Kokoro Kato | A |
| 12 | Aespa | "Spicy" | Wing Bell Moon (ウィング・ベル・ムーン) | Suzu Yamamoto | A | | | | | | |
| 13 | Iz*One | "Suki to Iwasetai" (好きと言わせたい) | Cool Girls | Rin Aita | C | | | | | | |
| 13 | Iz*One | "Suki to Iwasetai" (好きと言わせたい) | Cool Girls | Rio Oikawa | F | | | | | | |
| 13 | Iz*One | "Suki to Iwasetai" (好きと言わせたい) | Cool Girls | Nana Okamura | C | | | | | | |
| 13 | Iz*One | "Suki to Iwasetai" (好きと言わせたい) | Cool Girls | Haruka Sakuraba | F | | | | | | |
| 13 | Iz*One | "Suki to Iwasetai" (好きと言わせたい) | Cool Girls | Mika Shinzawa | D | | | | | | |
| 13 | Iz*One | "Suki to Iwasetai" (好きと言わせたい) | Cool Girls | Ayane Takami | A | | | | | | |
| 14 | Iz*One | "Violeta" | G-TRIANGLE | Aruha Oda | A | | | | | | |
| 14 | Iz*One | "Violeta" | G-TRIANGLE | Emi Oyanagi | D | | | | | | |
| 14 | Iz*One | "Violeta" | G-TRIANGLE | Ameli Sato | D | | | | | | |

== Re-evaluation Test (Episode 2–3) ==
Key

| Same position | Class maintained |
| ▲ | Class upgraded |
| ▼ | Class downgraded |

The top row indicates the initial level assigned after the Level Placement Test, while the first column indicates the new level after the re-evaluation.

Re-evaluation Test (2nd evaluation results)
| Before After | A class | B class | C class | D class | F class |
|---|---|---|---|---|---|
| A class | Tsuzumi Ebihara; Momona Kasahara; Kokoro Kato; Miu Sakurai; Tsukushi Sasaki; Sakura Sudo; Suzu Yamamoto | Joa Aramaki ▲; Ran Ishii ▲; Rino Sakaguchi ▲; Yuuki Tanaka ▲; Mena Hatta ▲ | Koto Tanaka ▲ | —N/a | |
| B class | Keiko Shimizu ▼; Ayane Takami ▼; Kotone Nakamori ▼; Mikoto Nakamori ▼ | Karen Otsubo; Nano Kenmotsu; Kokona Sasaki; Nana Tabata; Kokona Nakano; Miyu Matsushita; Rinon Murakami | Ema Akiyama ▲; Yui Ando ▲; Moe Kamada ▲; Maho Shiromaru ▲; Momoka Takabatake ▲; Riko Kino ▲ | Rio Kataoka ▲; Riro Nakamura ▲ | Kotone Sakata ▲ |
| C class | —N/a | Sakura Kitazume ▼; Honoka Kurokawa ▼; Yurara Sutani ▼; Karin Tanabe ▼; Ayano Yoshida ▼; Hana Yoshida ▼ | Nagomi Abe; Rin Uchiyama; Nana Okamura; Miyu Kanno; Hina Takahashi; Aiko Hamasaki; Runa Kawagishi | Yuka Aoki ▲; Shizuku Iida ▲; Konomi Kato ▲; Ayano Kamio ▲; Misaki Yamaguchi ▲; Miyu Watanabe ▲ | Airi Kato ▲ |
| D class | Aruha Oda ▼ | Rena Suzuki ▼; Rimika Mizukami ▼ | Sae Kobayashi ▼; Serina Saito ▼; Jueri Sano ▼; Honoka Nakayama ▼; Ayaka Hosoi ▼ | Chiharu Ando; Hana Iyota; Ameli Sato; Arisa Shibagaki; Aki Kikukawa; Sayaka Furuhashi; Kano Kurihara; Rikako Sekiguchi; Fuka Bando | Sara Ota ▲; Mana Koyama ▲; Natsuho Sugai ▲; Seia Tani ▲ |
| F class | —N/a | Ranka Kawabata ▼ | Rin Aita ▼; Mimi Ueki ▼; Nonoka Okabe ▼; Rio Kitazato ▼; Hazuki Hidaka ▼; Ayaka Fujimoto ▼; Mihaya Wakimoto ▼; Shion Mogi ▼ | Emi Oyanagi ▼; Mei Shibuya ▼; Mayu Takagi ▼; Miu Tabuchi ▼; Mika Shinzawa ▼; Mitsuki Yamazaki ▼; Meika Motohashi ▼ | Rio Oikawa; Aoi Nakamura; Kagura Kato; Hana Tanaka; Anon Moro; Haruka Sakuraba |

== Group Battle (Episode 3–4) ==
Color key

- Winner
- Leader
- Center
- Leader and Center
- Highest Score
- Lowest Score

Bold denotes the person who picked the team members.

All members of the winning team for each group received a benefit of 3,000 points, which were added to their cumulative votes for the 1st Ranking Announcement Ceremony. Furthermore, the ranking for Episode 5 combined the online votes with the audience live votes from the previous episode.

Group Evaluation (3rd evaluation results)
| Performance | | | Team | | Contestant | | | | |
| # | Artist | Song | # | Votes | Position | Name | Votes | Votes with bonus | Rank |
|---|---|---|---|---|---|---|---|---|---|
| 1 | Blackpink | "How You Like That" | 1 BLACK CATS | 265 | Main Vocal | **Yui Ando** | 41 | 3,041 | 24 |
| 1 | Blackpink | "How You Like That" | 1 BLACK CATS | 265 | Sub Vocal 1 | Nagomi Abe | 37 | 3,037 | 26 |
| 1 | Blackpink | "How You Like That" | 1 BLACK CATS | 265 | Sub Vocal 2 | Moe Kamada | 29 | 3,029 | 30 |
| 1 | Blackpink | "How You Like That" | 1 BLACK CATS | 265 | Sub Vocal 3 | Rino Sakaguchi | 43 | 3,043 | 23 |
| 1 | Blackpink | "How You Like That" | 1 BLACK CATS | 265 | Rapper 1 | Tsukushi Sasaki | 84 | 3,084 | 6 |
| 1 | Blackpink | "How You Like That" | 1 BLACK CATS | 265 | Rapper 2 | Joa Aramaki | 31 | 3,031 | 28 |
| 1 | Blackpink | "How You Like That" | 2 SHOW UP | 136 | Main Vocal | Konomi Kato | 6 | —N/a | 80 |
| 1 | Blackpink | "How You Like That" | 2 SHOW UP | 136 | Sub Vocal 1 | Chiharu Ando | 55 | —N/a | 51 |
| 1 | Blackpink | "How You Like That" | 2 SHOW UP | 136 | Sub Vocal 2 | Hana Tanaka | 18 | —N/a | 68 |
| 1 | Blackpink | "How You Like That" | 2 SHOW UP | 136 | Sub Vocal 3 | **Mihaya Wakimoto** | 8 | —N/a | 76 |
| 1 | Blackpink | "How You Like That" | 2 SHOW UP | 136 | Rapper 1 | Mei Shibuya | 24 | —N/a | 65 |
| 1 | Blackpink | "How You Like That" | 2 SHOW UP | 136 | Rapper 2 | Rikako Sekiguchi | 25 | —N/a | 64 |
| 2 | IVE | "Love Dive" | 1 首っ丈melty (Head Over Heels Melty) | 165 | Main Vocal | Honoka Kurokawa | 18 | —N/a | 68 |
| 2 | IVE | "Love Dive" | 1 首っ丈melty (Head Over Heels Melty) | 165 | Sub Vocal 1 | Shion Mogi | 27 | —N/a | 62 |
| 2 | IVE | "Love Dive" | 1 首っ丈melty (Head Over Heels Melty) | 165 | Sub Vocal 2 | Hana Iyota | 4 | —N/a | 85 |
| 2 | IVE | "Love Dive" | 1 首っ丈melty (Head Over Heels Melty) | 165 | Sub Vocal 3 | **Nana Tabata** | 5 | —N/a | 82 |
| 2 | IVE | "Love Dive" | 1 首っ丈melty (Head Over Heels Melty) | 165 | Sub Vocal 4 | Hana Yoshida | 81 | —N/a | 49 |
| 2 | IVE | "Love Dive" | 1 首っ丈melty (Head Over Heels Melty) | 165 | Rapper | Kotone Sakata | 30 | —N/a | 60 |
| 2 | IVE | "Love Dive" | 2 Queen Bee | 232 | Main Vocal | **Rin Uchiyama** | 56 | 3,056 | 16 |
| 2 | IVE | "Love Dive" | 2 Queen Bee | 232 | Sub Vocal 1 | Ayano Yoshida | 11 | 3,011 | 37 |
| 2 | IVE | "Love Dive" | 2 Queen Bee | 232 | Sub Vocal 2 | Rio Kitazato | 44 | 3,044 | 22 |
| 2 | IVE | "Love Dive" | 2 Queen Bee | 232 | Sub Vocal 3 | Ayano Kamio | 55 | 3,055 | 17 |
| 2 | IVE | "Love Dive" | 2 Queen Bee | 232 | Sub Vocal 4 | Miyu Matsushita | 28 | 3,028 | 31 |
| 2 | IVE | "Love Dive" | 2 Queen Bee | 232 | Rapper | Karin Tanabe | 38 | 3,038 | 25 |
| 3 | Nogizaka46 | "Seifuku no Mannequin" | 1 登り坂6 (Ascending 6) | 113 | Main Vocal | Ayaka Fujimoto | 45 | —N/a | 54 |
| 3 | Nogizaka46 | "Seifuku no Mannequin" | 1 登り坂6 (Ascending 6) | 113 | Sub Vocal 1 | Miu Tabuchi | 3 | —N/a | 88 |
| 3 | Nogizaka46 | "Seifuku no Mannequin" | 1 登り坂6 (Ascending 6) | 113 | Sub Vocal 2 | **Misaki Yamaguchi** | 4 | —N/a | 85 |
| 3 | Nogizaka46 | "Seifuku no Mannequin" | 1 登り坂6 (Ascending 6) | 113 | Sub Vocal 3 | Mimi Ueki | 5 | —N/a | 82 |
| 3 | Nogizaka46 | "Seifuku no Mannequin" | 1 登り坂6 (Ascending 6) | 113 | Sub Vocal 4 | Mayu Takagi | 1 | —N/a | 93 |
| 3 | Nogizaka46 | "Seifuku no Mannequin" | 1 登り坂6 (Ascending 6) | 113 | Sub Vocal 5 | Kagura Kato | 55 | —N/a | 51 |
| 3 | Nogizaka46 | "Seifuku no Mannequin" | 2 WAKEY WAKEY | 314 | Main Vocal | Ayane Takami | 151 | 3,151 | 2 |
| 3 | Nogizaka46 | "Seifuku no Mannequin" | 2 WAKEY WAKEY | 314 | Sub Vocal 1 | Sae Kobayashi | 10 | 3,010 | 40 |
| 3 | Nogizaka46 | "Seifuku no Mannequin" | 2 WAKEY WAKEY | 314 | Sub Vocal 2 | Ema Akiyama | 50 | 3,050 | 19 |
| 3 | Nogizaka46 | "Seifuku no Mannequin" | 2 WAKEY WAKEY | 314 | Sub Vocal 3 | **Aoi Nakamura** | 8 | 3,008 | 44 |
| 3 | Nogizaka46 | "Seifuku no Mannequin" | 2 WAKEY WAKEY | 314 | Sub Vocal 4 | Miyu Kanno | 46 | 3,046 | 21 |
| 3 | Nogizaka46 | "Seifuku no Mannequin" | 2 WAKEY WAKEY | 314 | Sub Vocal 5 | Mena Hatta | 49 | 3,049 | 20 |
| 4 | NewJeans | "Hype Boy" | 1 HypEST | 253 | Main Vocal | Rinon Murakami | 61 | 3,061 | 14 |
| 4 | NewJeans | "Hype Boy" | 1 HypEST | 253 | Sub Vocal 1 | **Fuka Bando** | 3 | 3,003 | 48 |
| 4 | NewJeans | "Hype Boy" | 1 HypEST | 253 | Sub Vocal 2 | Koto Tanaka | 31 | 3,031 | 28 |
| 4 | NewJeans | "Hype Boy" | 1 HypEST | 253 | Sub Vocal 3 | Yuuki Tanaka | 64 | 3,064 | 12 |
| 4 | NewJeans | "Hype Boy" | 1 HypEST | 253 | Sub Vocal 4 | Kokona Nakano | 84 | 3,084 | 6 |
| 4 | NewJeans | "Hype Boy" | 1 HypEST | 253 | Sub Vocal 5 | Aki Kikukawa | 10 | 3,010 | 40 |
| 4 | NewJeans | "Hype Boy" | 2 告白練習生 (Confession Trainees) | 138 | Main Vocal | **Arisa Shibagaki** | 3 | —N/a | 88 |
| 4 | NewJeans | "Hype Boy" | 2 告白練習生 (Confession Trainees) | 138 | Sub Vocal 1 | Aiko Hamasaki | 13 | —N/a | 72 |
| 4 | NewJeans | "Hype Boy" | 2 告白練習生 (Confession Trainees) | 138 | Sub Vocal 2 | Natsuho Sugai | 5 | —N/a | 82 |
| 4 | NewJeans | "Hype Boy" | 2 告白練習生 (Confession Trainees) | 138 | Sub Vocal 3 | Runa Kawagishi | 35 | —N/a | 58 |
| 4 | NewJeans | "Hype Boy" | 2 告白練習生 (Confession Trainees) | 138 | Sub Vocal 4 | Airi Kato | 37 | —N/a | 56 |
| 4 | NewJeans | "Hype Boy" | 2 告白練習生 (Confession Trainees) | 138 | Sub Vocal 5 | Emi Oyanagi | 45 | —N/a | 54 |
| 5 | Iz*One | "Fiesta" | 1 ONever | 84 | Main Vocal | Riro Nakamura | 4 | —N/a | 85 |
| 5 | Iz*One | "Fiesta" | 1 ONever | 84 | Sub Vocal 1 | Sakura Sudo | 28 | —N/a | 61 |
| 5 | Iz*One | "Fiesta" | 1 ONever | 84 | Sub Vocal 2 | Rio Kataoka | 2 | —N/a | 91 |
| 5 | Iz*One | "Fiesta" | 1 ONever | 84 | Sub Vocal 3 | Yurara Sutani | 26 | —N/a | 63 |
| 5 | Iz*One | "Fiesta" | 1 ONever | 84 | Sub Vocal 4 | Rena Suzuki | 2 | —N/a | 91 |
| 5 | Iz*One | "Fiesta" | 1 ONever | 84 | Rapper | **Miyu Watanabe** | 22 | —N/a | 66 |
| 5 | Iz*One | "Fiesta" | 2 Non blink | 301 | Main Vocal | Hina Takahashi | 82 | 3,082 | 8 |
| 5 | Iz*One | "Fiesta" | 2 Non blink | 301 | Sub Vocal 1 | Honoka Nakayama | 68 | 3,068 | 11 |
| 5 | Iz*One | "Fiesta" | 2 Non blink | 301 | Sub Vocal 2 | Yuka Aoki | 71 | 3,071 | 10 |
| 5 | Iz*One | "Fiesta" | 2 Non blink | 301 | Sub Vocal 3 | Rimika Mizukami | 64 | 3,064 | 12 |
| 5 | Iz*One | "Fiesta" | 2 Non blink | 301 | Sub Vocal 4 | Jueri Sano | 6 | 3,006 | 46 |
| 5 | Iz*One | "Fiesta" | 2 Non blink | 301 | Rapper | **Ameli Sato** | 10 | 3,010 | 40 |
| 6 | Twice | "Cheer Up" | 1 ラブポーション (Love Potion) | 211 | Main Vocal | Maho Shiromaru | 4 | 3,004 | 47 |
| 6 | Twice | "Cheer Up" | 1 ラブポーション (Love Potion) | 211 | Sub Vocal 1 | Mikoto Nakamori | 10 | 3,010 | 40 |
| 6 | Twice | "Cheer Up" | 1 ラブポーション (Love Potion) | 211 | Sub Vocal 2 | Sakura Kitazume | 139 | 3,139 | 3 |
| 6 | Twice | "Cheer Up" | 1 ラブポーション (Love Potion) | 211 | Sub Vocal 3 | **Karen Otsubo** | 35 | 3,035 | 27 |
| 6 | Twice | "Cheer Up" | 1 ラブポーション (Love Potion) | 211 | Rapper 1 | Riko Kino | 12 | 3,012 | 36 |
| 6 | Twice | "Cheer Up" | 1 ラブポーション (Love Potion) | 211 | Rapper 2 | Kotone Nakamori | 11 | 3,011 | 37 |
| 6 | Twice | "Cheer Up" | 2 Honey and chili | 187 | Main Vocal | Anon Moro | 56 | —N/a | 50 |
| 6 | Twice | "Cheer Up" | 2 Honey and chili | 187 | Sub Vocal 1 | **Seia Tani** | 7 | —N/a | 78 |
| 6 | Twice | "Cheer Up" | 2 Honey and chili | 187 | Sub Vocal 2 | Sayaka Furuhashi | 6 | —N/a | 80 |
| 6 | Twice | "Cheer Up" | 2 Honey and chili | 187 | Sub Vocal 3 | Aruha Oda | 35 | —N/a | 58 |
| 6 | Twice | "Cheer Up" | 2 Honey and chili | 187 | Rapper 1 | Ayaka Hosoi | 37 | —N/a | 56 |
| 6 | Twice | "Cheer Up" | 2 Honey and chili | 187 | Rapper 2 | Mitsuki Yamazaki | 46 | —N/a | 53 |
| 7 | Perfume | "Tokyo Girl" | 1 Mel-fish | 61 | Main Vocal | Nana Okamura | 7 | —N/a | 78 |
| 7 | Perfume | "Tokyo Girl" | 1 Mel-fish | 61 | Sub Vocal 1 | Haruka Sakuraba | 18 | —N/a | 68 |
| 7 | Perfume | "Tokyo Girl" | 1 Mel-fish | 61 | Sub Vocal 2 | Mika Shinzawa | 3 | —N/a | 88 |
| 7 | Perfume | "Tokyo Girl" | 1 Mel-fish | 61 | Sub Vocal 3 | Sara Ota | 1 | —N/a | 93 |
| 7 | Perfume | "Tokyo Girl" | 1 Mel-fish | 61 | Sub Vocal 4 | **Rio Oikawa** | 12 | —N/a | 74 |
| 7 | Perfume | "Tokyo Girl" | 1 Mel-fish | 61 | Sub Vocal 5 | Mana Koyama | 20 | —N/a | 67 |
| 7 | Perfume | "Tokyo Girl" | 2 AWAKE | 340 | Main Vocal | Momoka Takabatake | 73 | 3,073 | 9 |
| 7 | Perfume | "Tokyo Girl" | 2 AWAKE | 340 | Sub Vocal 1 | Keiko Shimizu | 21 | 3,021 | 35 |
| 7 | Perfume | "Tokyo Girl" | 2 AWAKE | 340 | Sub Vocal 2 | Nonoka Okabe | 7 | 3,007 | 45 |
| 7 | Perfume | "Tokyo Girl" | 2 AWAKE | 340 | Sub Vocal 3 | **Ran Ishii** | 123 | 3,123 | 4 |
| 7 | Perfume | "Tokyo Girl" | 2 AWAKE | 340 | Sub Vocal 4 | Momona Kasahara | 93 | 3,093 | 5 |
| 7 | Perfume | "Tokyo Girl" | 2 AWAKE | 340 | Sub Vocal 5 | Ranka Kawabata | 23 | 3,023 | 34 |
| 8 | Speed | "Body & Soul" | 1 Minx | 50 | Main Vocal | Shizuku Iida | 16 | —N/a | 71 |
| 8 | Speed | "Body & Soul" | 1 Minx | 50 | Sub Vocal 1 | Serina Saito | 13 | —N/a | 72 |
| 8 | Speed | "Body & Soul" | 1 Minx | 50 | Sub Vocal 2 | Kokona Sasaki | 11 | —N/a | 75 |
| 8 | Speed | "Body & Soul" | 1 Minx | 50 | Sub Vocal 3 | Rin Aita | 8 | —N/a | 76 |
| 8 | Speed | "Body & Soul" | 1 Minx | 50 | Rapper 1 | **Meika Motohashi** | 1 | —N/a | 93 |
| 8 | Speed | "Body & Soul" | 1 Minx | 50 | Rapper 2 | Kano Kurihara | 1 | —N/a | 93 |
| 8 | Speed | "Body & Soul" | 2 New bud | 352 | Main Vocal | Tsuzumi Ebihara | 172 | 3,172 | 1 |
| 8 | Speed | "Body & Soul" | 2 New bud | 352 | Sub Vocal 1 | Kokoro Kato | 61 | 3,061 | 14 |
| 8 | Speed | "Body & Soul" | 2 New bud | 352 | Sub Vocal 2 | Nano Kenmotsu | 26 | 3,026 | 33 |
| 8 | Speed | "Body & Soul" | 2 New bud | 352 | Sub Vocal 3 | **Miu Sakurai** | 28 | 3,028 | 31 |
| 8 | Speed | "Body & Soul" | 2 New bud | 352 | Rapper 1 | Hazuki Hidaka | 11 | 3,011 | 37 |
| 8 | Speed | "Body & Soul" | 2 New bud | 352 | Rapper 2 | Suzu Yamamoto | 54 | 3,054 | 18 |

== Position Battle Performances (Episode 6–7) ==
Color key

- Winner
- Leader
- Center
- Leader and center

Bold denotes the person who picked the song first. Priority was given to trainees who ranked higher during the previous ranking announcement.

The trainee who placed first in each team received a benefit of 10,000 votes. For the song "Run Run" by PROWDMON and LAS, a special rule applied: If the member who chose the song placed first in the dance position, all team members' votes would get doubled due to the difficulty of the choreography. However, since the group failed to place first, all of their votes got reset to zero instead. The trainee who ranked first in their respective category received an additional benefit of 100,000 votes.

Position Battle results
| Performance | | | Team | | Result | | Contestants | | |
| # | Original artist(s) | Song | Name | Points | Category rank | Votes | Votes with benefits/ deductions | Position | Name |
Vocal
| 2 | Namie Amuro | "Hero" | Heroes (ヒーローズ) | 1,558 | 3 | 479 | 10,479 | Main Vocal | Yui Ando |
| 2 | Namie Amuro | "Hero" | Heroes (ヒーローズ) | 1,558 | 5 (Note: Tsuzumi Ebihara and Ayane Takami both received 475 votes, which is why there is no sixth place.) | 475 | —N/a | Sub Vocal | **Tsuzumi Ebihara** |
| 2 | Namie Amuro | "Hero" | Heroes (ヒーローズ) | 1,558 | 15 | 168 | —N/a | Sub Vocal | Mayu Takagi |
| 2 | Namie Amuro | "Hero" | Heroes (ヒーローズ) | 1,558 | 10 | 431 | —N/a | Sub Vocal | Shizuku Iida |
| 4 | JO1 | "Shine A Light" | Shines | 1,467 | 9 | 435 | —N/a | Main Vocal | **Miu Sakurai** |
| 4 | JO1 | "Shine A Light" | Shines | 1,467 | 13 | 261 | —N/a | Sub Vocal | Kagura Kato |
| 4 | JO1 | "Shine A Light" | Shines | 1,467 | 7 | 470 | 10,470 | Sub Vocal | Hina Takahashi |
| 4 | JO1 | "Shine A Light" | Shines | 1,467 | 17 | 104 | —N/a | Sub Vocal | Chiharu Ando |
| 4 | JO1 | "Shine A Light" | Shines | 1,467 | 14 | 197 | —N/a | Sub Vocal | Hazuki Hidaka |
| 8 | Milet, Aimer, Lilas Ikuta | "Omokage" (おもかげ) | realize | 1,401 | 11 | 424 | —N/a | Main Vocal | **Kokoro Kato** |
| 8 | Milet, Aimer, Lilas Ikuta | "Omokage" (おもかげ) | realize | 1,401 | 16 | 143 | —N/a | Sub Vocal | Mena Hatta |
| 8 | Milet, Aimer, Lilas Ikuta | "Omokage" (おもかげ) | realize | 1,401 | 1 | 492 | 110,492 | Sub Vocal | Momoka Takabatake |
| 8 | Milet, Aimer, Lilas Ikuta | "Omokage" (おもかげ) | realize | 1,401 | 12 | 342 | —N/a | Sub Vocal | Haruka Sakuraba |
| 10 | Hikaru Utada | "First Love" | Final Love | 1,905 | 5 | 475 | —N/a | Main Vocal | Ayane Takami |
| 10 | Hikaru Utada | "First Love" | Final Love | 1,905 | 2 | 489 | 10,489 | Sub Vocal | Rino Sakaguchi |
| 10 | Hikaru Utada | "First Love" | Final Love | 1,905 | 8 | 464 | —N/a | Sub Vocal | **Kokona Sasaki** |
| 10 | Hikaru Utada | "First Love" | Final Love | 1,905 | 4 | 477 | —N/a | Sub Vocal | Nagomi Abe |
Dance
| 1 | Kep1er | "Wa Da Da" | MADADA | 2,594 | 9 | 426 | —N/a | Main Dancer | Ayano Yoshida |
| 1 | Kep1er | "Wa Da Da" | MADADA | 2,594 | 24 | 217 | —N/a | Sub Dancer | **Mikoto Nakamori** |
| 1 | Kep1er | "Wa Da Da" | MADADA | 2,594 | 12 | 383 | —N/a | Sub Dancer | Rin Uchiyama |
| 1 | Kep1er | "Wa Da Da" | MADADA | 2,594 | 3 | 467 | 10,467 | Sub Dancer | Ranka Kawabata |
| 1 | Kep1er | "Wa Da Da" | MADADA | 2,594 | 19 | 299 | —N/a | Sub Dancer | Miyu Kanno |
| 1 | Kep1er | "Wa Da Da" | MADADA | 2,594 | 5 | 443 | —N/a | Sub Dancer | Mana Koyama |
| 1 | Kep1er | "Wa Da Da" | MADADA | 2,594 | 16 | 359 | —N/a | Sub Dancer | Karen Otsubo |
| 3 | PROWDMON, LAS | "Run Run" | W Fighters | 2,439 | 2 | 494 | 0 (Note: Double Mission. The Benefit and vote for all members will be doubled, only if one of them ranked first in dance category. If the team failed, all of their vote will become 0.) | Main Dancer | Joa Aramaki |
| 3 | PROWDMON, LAS | "Run Run" | W Fighters | 2,439 | 26 | 150 | 0 | Sub Dancer | Mitsuki Yamazaki |
| 3 | PROWDMON, LAS | "Run Run" | W Fighters | 2,439 | 17 | 350 | 0 | Sub Dancer | **Koto Tanaka** |
| 3 | PROWDMON, LAS | "Run Run" | W Fighters | 2,439 | 8 | 428 | 0 | Sub Dancer | Yuuki Tanaka |
| 3 | PROWDMON, LAS | "Run Run" | W Fighters | 2,439 | 11 | 418 | 0 | Sub Dancer | Sakura Kitazume |
| 3 | PROWDMON, LAS | "Run Run" | W Fighters | 2,439 | 15 | 360 | 0 | Sub Dancer | Yurara Sutani |
| 3 | PROWDMON, LAS | "Run Run" | W Fighters | 2,439 | 23 | 239 | 0 | Sub Dancer | Serina Saito |
| 6 | Le Sserafim | "Antifragile" | peony | 1,902 | 6 | 433 | —N/a | Main Dancer | Miyu Matsushita |
| 6 | Le Sserafim | "Antifragile" | peony | 1,902 | 4 | 462 | 10,462 | Sub Dancer | **Nano Kenmotsu** |
| 6 | Le Sserafim | "Antifragile" | peony | 1,902 | 22 | 264 | —N/a | Sub Dancer | Rimika Mizukami |
| 6 | Le Sserafim | "Antifragile" | peony | 1,902 | 13 | 378 | —N/a | Sub Dancer | Ema Akiyama |
| 6 | Le Sserafim | "Antifragile" | peony | 1,902 | 14 | 365 | —N/a | Sub Dancer | Ayaka Fujimoto |
| 9 | INI | "Rocketeer" | Space7 | 2,399 | 1 | 509 | 110,509 | Main Dancer | **Ran Ishii** |
| 9 | INI | "Rocketeer" | Space7 | 2,399 | 25 | 169 | —N/a | Sub Dancer | Kotone Nakamori |
| 9 | INI | "Rocketeer" | Space7 | 2,399 | 7 | 431 | —N/a | Sub Dancer | Suzu Yamamoto |
| 9 | INI | "Rocketeer" | Space7 | 2,399 | 10 | 425 | —N/a | Sub Dancer | Rin Aita |
| 9 | INI | "Rocketeer" | Space7 | 2,399 | 21 | 278 | —N/a | Sub Dancer | Rio Kitazato |
| 9 | INI | "Rocketeer" | Space7 | 2,399 | 18 | 300 | —N/a | Sub Dancer | Sakura Sudo |
| 9 | INI | "Rocketeer" | Space7 | 2,399 | 20 | 287 | —N/a | Sub Dancer | Hana Yoshida |
Rap & Vocal
| 5 | Chanmina | "Bijin" (美人) | Uchira (ウチら) | 981 | 1 | 479 | 110,479 | Main Rapper | **Keiko Shimizu** |
| 5 | Chanmina | "Bijin" (美人) | Uchira (ウチら) | 981 | 3 | 461 | —N/a | Sub Rapper | Tsukushi Sasaki |
| 5 | Chanmina | "Bijin" (美人) | Uchira (ウチら) | 981 | 4 | 451 | —N/a | Sub Rapper | Rinon Murakami |
| 7 | Blackpink | "Shut Down" | Track Beats | 1,564 | 5 | 432 | —N/a | Main Rapper | Kokona Nakano |
| 7 | Blackpink | "Shut Down" | Track Beats | 1,564 | 2 | 473 | 10,473 | Sub Rapper | **Momona Kasahara** |
| 7 | Blackpink | "Shut Down" | Track Beats | 1,564 | 7 | 279 | —N/a | Sub Rapper | Ayano Kamio |
| 7 | Blackpink | "Shut Down" | Track Beats | 1,564 | 6 | 380 | —N/a | Sub Rapper | Kotone Sakata |

== Concept Evaluation Performances (Episode 9) ==
Color key

- Winner
- Leader
- Center
- Leader and Center

Members of each group are selected by audience vote on their official website between the broadcasts of episodes 5 and 6 (Nov 2 at 11:00 PM to Nov 9 at 11:59 PM (JST)). The winning group receives a total of 250,000 additional votes that is split based on each contestant's ranking: the contestant with the most votes receives 100,000 additional votes, while the least vote contestants receive 0 additional votes.

| Performance | | | | | Contestant | | |
| Concept | Group | Producer | Song | Votes | Position | Name | Bonus |
|---|---|---|---|---|---|---|---|
| | 2 トキメッキー (TOKIMEKKII) | Lyrics: 柿沼雅美(Relic Lyric, inc.), MirrorBOY(220VOLT), D.ham(220VOLT), Mun Hanmiru(220VOLT), BORAN, dundunman; Composition: MirrorBOY(220VOLT), D.ham(220VOLT), Mun Hanmiru(220VOLT), BORAN, dundunman; Arrangement: MirrorBOY(220VOLT), D.ham(220VOLT), Mun Hanmiru(220VOLT), BORAN, dundunman | "AtoZ" | 67 | Main Vocal | Hina Takahashi | |
| | 2 トキメッキー (TOKIMEKKII) | Lyrics: 柿沼雅美(Relic Lyric, inc.), MirrorBOY(220VOLT), D.ham(220VOLT), Mun Hanmiru(220VOLT), BORAN, dundunman; Composition: MirrorBOY(220VOLT), D.ham(220VOLT), Mun Hanmiru(220VOLT), BORAN, dundunman; Arrangement: MirrorBOY(220VOLT), D.ham(220VOLT), Mun Hanmiru(220VOLT), BORAN, dundunman | "AtoZ" | 67 | Sub Vocal 1 | Shizuku Iida | |
| | 2 トキメッキー (TOKIMEKKII) | Lyrics: 柿沼雅美(Relic Lyric, inc.), MirrorBOY(220VOLT), D.ham(220VOLT), Mun Hanmiru(220VOLT), BORAN, dundunman; Composition: MirrorBOY(220VOLT), D.ham(220VOLT), Mun Hanmiru(220VOLT), BORAN, dundunman; Arrangement: MirrorBOY(220VOLT), D.ham(220VOLT), Mun Hanmiru(220VOLT), BORAN, dundunman | "AtoZ" | 67 | Sub Vocal 2 | Kagura Kato | |
| | 2 トキメッキー (TOKIMEKKII) | Lyrics: 柿沼雅美(Relic Lyric, inc.), MirrorBOY(220VOLT), D.ham(220VOLT), Mun Hanmiru(220VOLT), BORAN, dundunman; Composition: MirrorBOY(220VOLT), D.ham(220VOLT), Mun Hanmiru(220VOLT), BORAN, dundunman; Arrangement: MirrorBOY(220VOLT), D.ham(220VOLT), Mun Hanmiru(220VOLT), BORAN, dundunman | "AtoZ" | 67 | Sub Vocal 3 | Miyu Matsushita | |
| | 2 トキメッキー (TOKIMEKKII) | Lyrics: 柿沼雅美(Relic Lyric, inc.), MirrorBOY(220VOLT), D.ham(220VOLT), Mun Hanmiru(220VOLT), BORAN, dundunman; Composition: MirrorBOY(220VOLT), D.ham(220VOLT), Mun Hanmiru(220VOLT), BORAN, dundunman; Arrangement: MirrorBOY(220VOLT), D.ham(220VOLT), Mun Hanmiru(220VOLT), BORAN, dundunman | "AtoZ" | 67 | Sub Vocal 4 | Mena Hatta | |
| | 2 トキメッキー (TOKIMEKKII) | Lyrics: 柿沼雅美(Relic Lyric, inc.), MirrorBOY(220VOLT), D.ham(220VOLT), Mun Hanmiru(220VOLT), BORAN, dundunman; Composition: MirrorBOY(220VOLT), D.ham(220VOLT), Mun Hanmiru(220VOLT), BORAN, dundunman; Arrangement: MirrorBOY(220VOLT), D.ham(220VOLT), Mun Hanmiru(220VOLT), BORAN, dundunman | "AtoZ" | 67 | Sub Vocal 5 | Haruka Sakuraba | |
| | 2 トキメッキー (TOKIMEKKII) | Lyrics: 柿沼雅美(Relic Lyric, inc.), MirrorBOY(220VOLT), D.ham(220VOLT), Mun Hanmiru(220VOLT), BORAN, dundunman; Composition: MirrorBOY(220VOLT), D.ham(220VOLT), Mun Hanmiru(220VOLT), BORAN, dundunman; Arrangement: MirrorBOY(220VOLT), D.ham(220VOLT), Mun Hanmiru(220VOLT), BORAN, dundunman | "AtoZ" | 67 | Rapper 1 | Rinon Murakami | |
| | 1 CLAW-me | Lyrics: Sonomi Tameoka, jaguaa(NiNE), Kim Min Gu(NiNE); Composition: Kim Min Gu(NiNE), Funny Bone(NiNE), jaguaa(NiNE), Lee Ye Jun(NiNE), Nino; Arrangement: Lee Ye Jun(NiNE), Funny Bone(NiNE), Kim Min Gu(NiNE) | "小悪魔(Baddie)" | 67 | Main Vocal | Rino Sakaguchi | |
| | 1 CLAW-me | Lyrics: Sonomi Tameoka, jaguaa(NiNE), Kim Min Gu(NiNE); Composition: Kim Min Gu(NiNE), Funny Bone(NiNE), jaguaa(NiNE), Lee Ye Jun(NiNE), Nino; Arrangement: Lee Ye Jun(NiNE), Funny Bone(NiNE), Kim Min Gu(NiNE) | "小悪魔(Baddie)" | 67 | Sub Vocal 1 | Yui Ando | |
| | 1 CLAW-me | Lyrics: Sonomi Tameoka, jaguaa(NiNE), Kim Min Gu(NiNE); Composition: Kim Min Gu(NiNE), Funny Bone(NiNE), jaguaa(NiNE), Lee Ye Jun(NiNE), Nino; Arrangement: Lee Ye Jun(NiNE), Funny Bone(NiNE), Kim Min Gu(NiNE) | "小悪魔(Baddie)" | 67 | Sub Vocal 2 | Hana Yoshida | |
| | 1 CLAW-me | Lyrics: Sonomi Tameoka, jaguaa(NiNE), Kim Min Gu(NiNE); Composition: Kim Min Gu(NiNE), Funny Bone(NiNE), jaguaa(NiNE), Lee Ye Jun(NiNE), Nino; Arrangement: Lee Ye Jun(NiNE), Funny Bone(NiNE), Kim Min Gu(NiNE) | "小悪魔(Baddie)" | 67 | Sub Vocal 3 | Ayano Kamio | |
| | 1 CLAW-me | Lyrics: Sonomi Tameoka, jaguaa(NiNE), Kim Min Gu(NiNE); Composition: Kim Min Gu(NiNE), Funny Bone(NiNE), jaguaa(NiNE), Lee Ye Jun(NiNE), Nino; Arrangement: Lee Ye Jun(NiNE), Funny Bone(NiNE), Kim Min Gu(NiNE) | "小悪魔(Baddie)" | 67 | Sub Vocal 4 | Yurara Sutani | |
| | 1 CLAW-me | Lyrics: Sonomi Tameoka, jaguaa(NiNE), Kim Min Gu(NiNE); Composition: Kim Min Gu(NiNE), Funny Bone(NiNE), jaguaa(NiNE), Lee Ye Jun(NiNE), Nino; Arrangement: Lee Ye Jun(NiNE), Funny Bone(NiNE), Kim Min Gu(NiNE) | "小悪魔(Baddie)" | 67 | Rapper 1 | Keiko Shimizu | |
| | 1 CLAW-me | Lyrics: Sonomi Tameoka, jaguaa(NiNE), Kim Min Gu(NiNE); Composition: Kim Min Gu(NiNE), Funny Bone(NiNE), jaguaa(NiNE), Lee Ye Jun(NiNE), Nino; Arrangement: Lee Ye Jun(NiNE), Funny Bone(NiNE), Kim Min Gu(NiNE) | "小悪魔(Baddie)" | 67 | Rapper 2 | Ranka Kawabata | |
| | 4 new F7avors | Lyrics: Chiaki Nagasawa, Ryo Ito; Composition: CHAKUN (VILLAINX), ELLUII (VILLAINX), J6 (VILLAINX); Arrangement: J6 (VILLAINX) | "Popcorn" | 59 | Main Vocal | Sakura Kitazume | |
| | 4 new F7avors | Lyrics: Chiaki Nagasawa, Ryo Ito; Composition: CHAKUN (VILLAINX), ELLUII (VILLAINX), J6 (VILLAINX); Arrangement: J6 (VILLAINX) | "Popcorn" | 59 | Sub Vocal 1 | Nagomi Abe | |
| | 4 new F7avors | Lyrics: Chiaki Nagasawa, Ryo Ito; Composition: CHAKUN (VILLAINX), ELLUII (VILLAINX), J6 (VILLAINX); Arrangement: J6 (VILLAINX) | "Popcorn" | 59 | Sub Vocal 2 | Hazuki Hidaka | |
| | 4 new F7avors | Lyrics: Chiaki Nagasawa, Ryo Ito; Composition: CHAKUN (VILLAINX), ELLUII (VILLAINX), J6 (VILLAINX); Arrangement: J6 (VILLAINX) | "Popcorn" | 59 | Sub Vocal 3 | Joa Aramaki | |
| | 4 new F7avors | Lyrics: Chiaki Nagasawa, Ryo Ito; Composition: CHAKUN (VILLAINX), ELLUII (VILLAINX), J6 (VILLAINX); Arrangement: J6 (VILLAINX) | "Popcorn" | 59 | Sub Vocal 4 | Rio Kitazato | |
| | 4 new F7avors | Lyrics: Chiaki Nagasawa, Ryo Ito; Composition: CHAKUN (VILLAINX), ELLUII (VILLAINX), J6 (VILLAINX); Arrangement: J6 (VILLAINX) | "Popcorn" | 59 | Rapper 1 | Kokona Nakano | |
| | 4 new F7avors | Lyrics: Chiaki Nagasawa, Ryo Ito; Composition: CHAKUN (VILLAINX), ELLUII (VILLAINX), J6 (VILLAINX); Arrangement: J6 (VILLAINX) | "Popcorn" | 59 | Rapper 2 | Serina Saito | |
| | 5 Charm Holic | Lyrics: Rose Blueming; Composition: KZ, HONEYSWEAT, B.O.; Arrangement: HONEYSWEAT | "TOXIC" | 143 | Main Vocal | Ayane Takami | |
| | 5 Charm Holic | Lyrics: Rose Blueming; Composition: KZ, HONEYSWEAT, B.O.; Arrangement: HONEYSWEAT | "TOXIC" | 143 | Sub Vocal 1 | Kokona Sasaki | |
| | 5 Charm Holic | Lyrics: Rose Blueming; Composition: KZ, HONEYSWEAT, B.O.; Arrangement: HONEYSWEAT | "TOXIC" | 143 | Sub Vocal 2 | Yuuki Tanaka | |
| | 5 Charm Holic | Lyrics: Rose Blueming; Composition: KZ, HONEYSWEAT, B.O.; Arrangement: HONEYSWEAT | "TOXIC" | 143 | Sub Vocal 3 | Ran Ishii | |
| | 5 Charm Holic | Lyrics: Rose Blueming; Composition: KZ, HONEYSWEAT, B.O.; Arrangement: HONEYSWEAT | "TOXIC" | 143 | Sub Vocal 4 | Nano Kenmotsu | |
| | 5 Charm Holic | Lyrics: Rose Blueming; Composition: KZ, HONEYSWEAT, B.O.; Arrangement: HONEYSWEAT | "TOXIC" | 143 | Rapper 1 | Momoka Takabatake | |
| | 5 Charm Holic | Lyrics: Rose Blueming; Composition: KZ, HONEYSWEAT, B.O.; Arrangement: HONEYSWEAT | "TOXIC" | 143 | Rapper 2 | Tsukushi Sasaki | |
| | 3 NALALA | Lyrics: HASEGAWA, Jung Hohyun(e.one), Ondine, BYMORE; Composition: Jung Hohyun(e.one), BYMORE, Ondine; Arrangement: Jung Hohyun(e.one), BYMORE, Ondine | "&ME" | 152 | Main Vocal | Tsuzumi Ebihara | +100,000 (Note: With 36 live votes, Tsuzumi was announced as the winner.) |
| | 3 NALALA | Lyrics: HASEGAWA, Jung Hohyun(e.one), Ondine, BYMORE; Composition: Jung Hohyun(e.one), BYMORE, Ondine; Arrangement: Jung Hohyun(e.one), BYMORE, Ondine | "&ME" | 152 | Sub Vocal 1 | Miu Sakurai | +50,000 (Note: With 35 live votes, Miu was announced as second place.) |
| | 3 NALALA | Lyrics: HASEGAWA, Jung Hohyun(e.one), Ondine, BYMORE; Composition: Jung Hohyun(e.one), BYMORE, Ondine; Arrangement: Jung Hohyun(e.one), BYMORE, Ondine | "&ME" | 152 | Sub Vocal 2 | Suzu Yamamoto | +25,000 (Note: With 18 live votes, Suzu was announced as fourth place, tied with Kokoro Kato.) |
| | 3 NALALA | Lyrics: HASEGAWA, Jung Hohyun(e.one), Ondine, BYMORE; Composition: Jung Hohyun(e.one), BYMORE, Ondine; Arrangement: Jung Hohyun(e.one), BYMORE, Ondine | "&ME" | 152 | Sub Vocal 3 | Rin Aita | +10,000 (Note: With 7 live votes, Rin was announced as sixth place.) |
| | 3 NALALA | Lyrics: HASEGAWA, Jung Hohyun(e.one), Ondine, BYMORE; Composition: Jung Hohyun(e.one), BYMORE, Ondine; Arrangement: Jung Hohyun(e.one), BYMORE, Ondine | "&ME" | 152 | Sub Vocal 4 | Momona Kasahara | +40,000 (Note: With 32 live votes, Momona was announced as third place.) |
| | 3 NALALA | Lyrics: HASEGAWA, Jung Hohyun(e.one), Ondine, BYMORE; Composition: Jung Hohyun(e.one), BYMORE, Ondine; Arrangement: Jung Hohyun(e.one), BYMORE, Ondine | "&ME" | 152 | Rapper 1 | Kokoro Kato | +25,000 (Note: With 18 live votes, Kokoro was announced as fourth place, tied with Suzu Yamamoto.) |
| | 3 NALALA | Lyrics: HASEGAWA, Jung Hohyun(e.one), Ondine, BYMORE; Composition: Jung Hohyun(e.one), BYMORE, Ondine; Arrangement: Jung Hohyun(e.one), BYMORE, Ondine | "&ME" | 152 | Rapper 2 | Koto Tanaka | (Note: With 6 live votes, Koto was announced as seventh place.) |

== Debut Evaluation Performances (Episode 11) ==
Color key

- Leader
- Center
- Leader And Center

| Performance | | | Contestant | |
| # | Producer | Song | Position | Name |
|---|---|---|---|---|
| 1 | Lyrics: Jung Hohyun(e.one), Sophia Pae, Rose Blueming; Composition: Jung Hohyun(e.one), Sophia Pae, Rose Blueming; Arrangement: TBA | "Beyond your Imagination" (想像以上) | Main Vocal | Momona Kasahara |
| 1 | Lyrics: Jung Hohyun(e.one), Sophia Pae, Rose Blueming; Composition: Jung Hohyun(e.one), Sophia Pae, Rose Blueming; Arrangement: TBA | "Beyond your Imagination" (想像以上) | Sub Vocal 1 | Miu Sakurai |
| 1 | Lyrics: Jung Hohyun(e.one), Sophia Pae, Rose Blueming; Composition: Jung Hohyun(e.one), Sophia Pae, Rose Blueming; Arrangement: TBA | "Beyond your Imagination" (想像以上) | Sub Vocal 2 | Rin Aita |
| 1 | Lyrics: Jung Hohyun(e.one), Sophia Pae, Rose Blueming; Composition: Jung Hohyun(e.one), Sophia Pae, Rose Blueming; Arrangement: TBA | "Beyond your Imagination" (想像以上) | Sub Vocal 3 | Yuuki Tanaka |
| 1 | Lyrics: Jung Hohyun(e.one), Sophia Pae, Rose Blueming; Composition: Jung Hohyun(e.one), Sophia Pae, Rose Blueming; Arrangement: TBA | "Beyond your Imagination" (想像以上) | Sub Vocal 4 | Kokona Sasaki |
| 1 | Lyrics: Jung Hohyun(e.one), Sophia Pae, Rose Blueming; Composition: Jung Hohyun(e.one), Sophia Pae, Rose Blueming; Arrangement: TBA | "Beyond your Imagination" (想像以上) | Rapper 1 | Rinon Murakami |
| 1 | Lyrics: Jung Hohyun(e.one), Sophia Pae, Rose Blueming; Composition: Jung Hohyun(e.one), Sophia Pae, Rose Blueming; Arrangement: TBA | "Beyond your Imagination" (想像以上) | Rapper 2 | Rino Sakaguchi |
| 1 | Lyrics: Jung Hohyun(e.one), Sophia Pae, Rose Blueming; Composition: Jung Hohyun(e.one), Sophia Pae, Rose Blueming; Arrangement: TBA | "Beyond your Imagination" (想像以上) | Rapper 3 | Nano Kenmotsu |
| 1 | Lyrics: Jung Hohyun(e.one), Sophia Pae, Rose Blueming; Composition: Jung Hohyun(e.one), Sophia Pae, Rose Blueming; Arrangement: TBA | "Beyond your Imagination" (想像以上) | Rapper 4 | Momoka Takabatake |
| 1 | Lyrics: Jung Hohyun(e.one), Sophia Pae, Rose Blueming; Composition: Jung Hohyun(e.one), Sophia Pae, Rose Blueming; Arrangement: TBA | "Beyond your Imagination" (想像以上) | Rapper 5 | Rio Kitazato |
| 2 | Lyrics: KZ, Nthonius, B.O, Hiyori Nara; Composition: KZ, Nthonius, B.O, Hiyori Nara; Arrangement: TBA | "CHOPPY CHOPPY" | Main Vocal | Tsuzumi Ebihara |
| 2 | Lyrics: KZ, Nthonius, B.O, Hiyori Nara; Composition: KZ, Nthonius, B.O, Hiyori Nara; Arrangement: TBA | "CHOPPY CHOPPY" | Sub Vocal 1 | Kagura Kato |
| 2 | Lyrics: KZ, Nthonius, B.O, Hiyori Nara; Composition: KZ, Nthonius, B.O, Hiyori Nara; Arrangement: TBA | "CHOPPY CHOPPY" | Sub Vocal 2 | Kokoro Kato |
| 2 | Lyrics: KZ, Nthonius, B.O, Hiyori Nara; Composition: KZ, Nthonius, B.O, Hiyori Nara; Arrangement: TBA | "CHOPPY CHOPPY" | Sub Vocal 3 | Shizuku Iida |
| 2 | Lyrics: KZ, Nthonius, B.O, Hiyori Nara; Composition: KZ, Nthonius, B.O, Hiyori Nara; Arrangement: TBA | "CHOPPY CHOPPY" | Sub Vocal 4 | Suzu Yamamoto |
| 2 | Lyrics: KZ, Nthonius, B.O, Hiyori Nara; Composition: KZ, Nthonius, B.O, Hiyori Nara; Arrangement: TBA | "CHOPPY CHOPPY" | Sub Vocal 5 | Haruka Sakuraba |
| 2 | Lyrics: KZ, Nthonius, B.O, Hiyori Nara; Composition: KZ, Nthonius, B.O, Hiyori Nara; Arrangement: TBA | "CHOPPY CHOPPY" | Sub Vocal 6 | Ayane Takami |
| 2 | Lyrics: KZ, Nthonius, B.O, Hiyori Nara; Composition: KZ, Nthonius, B.O, Hiyori Nara; Arrangement: TBA | "CHOPPY CHOPPY" | Rapper 1 | Ran Ishii |
| 2 | Lyrics: KZ, Nthonius, B.O, Hiyori Nara; Composition: KZ, Nthonius, B.O, Hiyori Nara; Arrangement: TBA | "CHOPPY CHOPPY" | Rapper 2 | Koto Tanaka |
| 2 | Lyrics: KZ, Nthonius, B.O, Hiyori Nara; Composition: KZ, Nthonius, B.O, Hiyori Nara; Arrangement: TBA | "CHOPPY CHOPPY" | Rapper 3 | Keiko Shimizu |
