= Flash =

Flash, flashes, or FLASH may refer to:

== Arts, entertainment, and media ==
=== Fictional aliases ===
- The Flash, several DC Comics superheroes with super speed:
  - Jay Garrick
  - Barry Allen
  - Wally West, the first Kid Flash and third adult Flash
  - Bart Allen, the second Kid Flash who also became the adult hero for a time
- Flash (G.I. Joe), a character in the G.I. Joe universe
- Flash, a robot in the video game Brave Saga 2
- Flash, a character in the comedy film Daddy Day Care (2003)
- Flash, a character in the TV science fiction drama Real Humans
- Flash, a character in the 1989 American action comedy movie Speed Zone
- Flash, a character in the TV sitcom Step by Step
- Flash, a character in the film Zootopia (2016)
- Flash Gordon, the titular hero of science fiction comic strip
- Flash Sentry, in My Little Pony: Friendship is Magic
- Flash Thompson, a Marvel comic book character
- Flash, known as Furzz in the US, an anthropomorphic rabbit from Roary the Racing Car
- Flashy Flash, a hero on One Punch Man

=== Films ===
- Flash (1997 film), Disney Channel
- Flash (2007 film), Malayalam
- The Flash (film), 2023, based on DC comics

=== Games ===
- Flash (pinball), a 1979 Williams pinball game
- Teen patti or Flash, a three-card poker-style game
- The Flash (video game), 1991, based on the superhero
- Flash, a non-standard poker hand

=== Literature and visual arts ===
==== Comics ====
- Flash Comics, a 1940s anthology comic book
- The Flash (DC Rebirth), a comic book in the DC Rebirth relaunch
- The Flash (comic book), an ongoing DC series

==== Periodicals ====
- Flash Weekly Newspicture Magazine, a defunct American photography magazine
- Flash (magazine), a quarterly Australian photography magazine
- Flash (Auckland newspaper), New Zealand
- Flash (French newspaper), a defunct far-right newspaper
- Flash (tabloid), a Canadian tabloid published from 1938 to 1973

==== Other literature ====
- Flash (Krentz novel), a 1998 romance novel
- Flash (Modesitt novel), a 2004 science fiction novel

==== Other visual arts ====
- Flash (photography), a device that produces a burst of light to illuminate a scene
- Flash (tattoo), a source pattern for body art
- Flash, a lightning bolt symbol, for example in Flash and Circle

=== Music ===
==== Music groups ====
- Flash (band), a 1970s progressive rock group

==== Albums and EPs ====
- Flash (Amoyamo album) (2013)
- Flash (EP), 2010, by Crystal Kay
- Flash (Jeff Beck album)
- Flash (Electric Food album) (1970)
- Flash (Flash album) (1972)
- Flash (Moving Sidewalks album) (1968)
- Flash (Towa Tei album) (2005)
- Flash, a 1996 album by Red Five

==== Songs ====
- "Flashes" (song), 1931, by Bix Beiderbecke
- "Flash" (Queen song), 1980
- "Flash" (Stéphanie song), 1986
- "Flash" (B.B.E. song), 1997
- "Flash" (Iggy Azalea song), 2012
- "Flash" (Perfume song), 2016
- "Flash" (X1 song), 2019
- "Flash", by 2hollis from Star, 2025
- "Flash", by Cigarettes After Sex from their self-titled album, 2017
- "Flash", by Rocket Punch, 2022

=== Television ===
- The Flash (1990 TV series), an American superhero series
- The Flash (2014 TV series), an American superhero series
- "Flash" (The Detectives), a 1995 episode

== Military ==
- Flash priority (or FLASH), any of several military message precedence designations
- M202 FLASH, a rocket launcher
- Operation Flash, a May 1995 Croatian Army offensive in Western Slavonia
- Tactical recognition flash, a combat clothing arm patch indicating affiliation

== People ==
=== Artists and performers ===
- Flash Brown (born 1981), pornographic actor and basketball player
- Grandmaster Flash (born 1958), American hip hop musician and DJ
- Larry "Flash" Jenkins (1955–2019), American actor, film director, producer, and screenwriter
- Flash Terry (1934–2004), American guitarist and singer

=== Professional fighters and gamers ===
- Flash (wrestler) (born 1981), masked professional wrestler
- Adam Flash (born 1971), American professional wrestler
- Flash Flanagan (born 1974), American professional wrestler
- Scott Norton (born 1961), American professional wrestler
- Flash (active 1995), on the TV show American Gladiators
- Gabriel Elorde (1935–1985), Filipino professional boxer
- Lee Young-ho (born 1992), South Korean professional Starcraft player also known as "Flash"

=== Athletes ===
- Flash Brown (born 1981), pornographic actor and basketball player
- Richard Flash (born 1976), English footballer
- Josh Gordon (born 1991), American football player
- Flash Hollett (1911–1999), Canadian ice hockey defenceman
- Cordarrelle Patterson (born 1991), American football player
- Gordon Shedden (born 1979), British racing driver
- Dwyane Wade (born 1982), American basketball player

=== Other people ===
- George Flash (1909–1990), Israeli politician
- Sandy Flash (died 1778), American highwayman
- Mark Kennedy (policeman) (born 1969), known undercover as Flash or Mark Stone

== Places ==
- Flash, Staffordshire, a village in England
- The Flash (lake), near Borras, Wales
- Flash (lake), a body of water that forms where the land below it has subsided

== Science and technology ==
=== Computing ===
- Adobe Flash (formerly Shockwave Flash and Macromedia Flash), multimedia platform software
  - Adobe Animate
  - Adobe Flash Player
  - Flash Video
- Flash memory, a kind of non-volatile computer memory
- Flash!, the bundled graphics package for the SAM Coupé home computer

=== Other uses in science and technology ===
- Flash (manufacturing), excess material attached to a moulded product
- Flash (photography), instantaneous illumination for picture taking
- FLASH, a particle physics facility in Germany
- Flash lightning, a lightning burst within a cloud (Intracloud)
- FlAsH-EDT2 or FlAsH tag, a fluorescent label for proteins
- Hook flash, a telephony signal, often known as simply 'flash'
- Fast low angle shot magnetic resonance imaging (FLASH), an MRI pulse sequence

== Sports ==
- Flash (juggling), a type of throwing and catching
- Delaware Blue Coats, originally the Utah Flash, an NBA Development League team
- Flash Stakes, a former Thoroughbred horse race
- Kent State Golden Flashes or just the Flashes, the athletics teams of Kent State University
- Las Vegas Flash, an inline hockey team in 1994
- Monterrey Flash, a Mexican indoor soccer team formed in 2011
- Rochester Flash, a former American Soccer League team
- San Diego Flash, a soccer team based in San Diego, California
- Western New York Flash, an American women's soccer franchise

== Vehicular sports ==
- Fly Castelluccio Flash, an Italian paramotor design
- Tilbury Flash, an American racing monoplane built in the 1930s
- Flash Engineering, a Swedish motorsports team

== Transportation ==
- M202 FLASH, a rocket launcher
- Flash Airlines, an Egyptian private charter airline
- Flash BRT, a bus system in Montgomery County, Maryland

== Other uses ==
- Flash (cleaning product), the trading name of Mr. Clean in the UK and Ireland
- Flash, to expose a person's private parts to another person in exhibitionism

== See also ==
- Flashing (disambiguation)
- Flesch (disambiguation)
