= Newsflash (disambiguation) =

A newsflash (news flash) is a breaking news report.

Newsflash, News Flash, or variant, may refer to:

- Sesame Street News Flash (TV segment), a recurrent segment on Sesame Street
- "News Flash" (TV episode), a 2018 season 5 number 4 episode 96 of The Flash
- Newsflash (film), a film in production, about Walter Cronkite and the President Kennedy assassination
- "Newsflash" (song), a 2018 song off the album Zephyr by Niki (singer)
- "Newsflash" (song), a 2004 song by Sweatshop Union off the album Natural Progression
- NewsFlash (新动漫), a Chinese language TV channel; see List of Chinese-language television channels

== See also ==
- news broadcasting
- breaking news
- news report
- Flash (disambiguation)
- News (disambiguation)
