= Red 5 =

Red 5 may refer to:

- Red 5, a Rebel call sign in the classic era of the Star Wars universe
- Red5 (media server)
- Red 5, a pseudonym of German DJ and musician Thomas Kukula
- Red 5, Nigel Mansell's nickname whilst he drove for Williams and Newman/Haas Racing
- Red 5, a suit tile in Japanese Mahjong
- Red 5 Comics, an indie comic publisher, mainly famous for Atomic Robo
- Red 5 Studios, a studio formed by three key former members of the World of Warcraft team
- Red Five, a Russian spy ring broken up post-World War II, discussed in Foyle's War Series Seven, episode 3 ("Sunflower")
- Red Five (band), an American rock band
