= Next Stage with You =

"Next Stage With You"

Song by Perfume

from the album Cosmic Explorer
- Released: November 25, 2015 (Promotional airplay); April 6, 2016 (digital purchase)
- Recorded: 2015
- Genre: Electropop; dance-pop
- Length: 4:39
- Label: Universal Music Japan; Perfume Records
- Songwriter: Yasutaka Nakata
- Producer: Nakata

"Next Stage with You" (stylized as "Next Stage with YOU") is a song recorded by Japanese girl group Perfume. It was released as the group's first promotional single by Universal Music Japan and the group's self-titled subsidiary label in November 2015 from their fifth studio album Cosmic Explorer. It was fully written, composed, arranged, and produced by Japanese musician and the group's primary collaborator Yasutaka Nakata. Musically, "Next Stage with You" was noted by critics as a return to the group's previous music releases such as Game and Triangle, incorporating elements of electropop and dance music, and features instrumentation of synthesizers and keyboards.

Upon its release, the song was critically acclaimed from music critics. Majority of the critics selected it as the album's strongest track, alongside them commending the composition and production. Some critics have even listed it as one of the group's best track throughout their discography. Despite the track not entering any record charts in Japan, it was heavily promoted in the country for the Japanese launch of the Mercedes-Benz A-Class; it also received a short animation music video by Yoshiyuki Sadamoto and a mobile app for the song. The song has been performed on the group's 2016 world tour promoting Cosmic Explorer.

== Background and composition ==
Perfume begun recording their new studio album in mid 2015, and released additional tracks including "Story", "Relax in the City", and "Pick Me Up". Then on November 26, the group released the second and final promotional single titled "Next Stage with You"; the single was released as the theme song to the Japanese launch of the Mercedes-Benz A-Class. It was released as the group's second promotional single by Universal Music Japan and the group's self-titled subsidiary label from their fifth studio album Cosmic Explorer (2016). It was fully written, composed, arranged, and produced by Japanese musician and the group's primary collaborator Yasutaka Nakata; he had also created all the tracks from Cosmic Explorer. Although there is no official artwork of the single, the mobile app in which the song was included on at iTunes Store features the Mercedes-Benz logo.

Musically, the song is an electropop song that incorporates elements of mid-tempo dance music and dubstep, as described by J-PopGo.co.uk writer Paul B. According to Ronald Taylor at The Japan Times, he believed that the song, particularly its bridge section resembled the group's previous music releases such as Game and Triangle. Shreya Aiyar, writing for the Daily Bruin, compared the song's composition to the work of French electronic music duo Daft Punk. Erin Smith at HelloAsia.com.au described it as a "very synth driven track, and uses effect-laden voices as instruments in their own right with lyric-less voice lines."

== Critical response ==
Upon its release, the song was critically acclaimed from music critics. Paul B. from J-PopGo.co.uk was positive in his review, labelling it "unabashed electropop goodness...". Whilst reviewing the album, a member at Selective Hearing noted that "Next Stage with You" and three other album songs presented a "lighter flair" than majority of the album's remaining tracks; the member found it an "evolution" in the group's sound. Ronald Taylor from The Japan Times enjoyed the song and complimented Nakata for transcending Perfume's "classic" technopop sound into the song. Taylor then talked about the album on AramaJapan.com, and found that the song and another track "Hold Your Hand" were the only material from the album that didn't show a "loss of quickness in favor for Western EDM music." In a similar review, Shreya Aiyar, writing for the Daily Bruin, enjoyed the song but found it complimented another album track "Miracle Worker" better for its composition. Ian Martin, who contributed in writing reviews and the extended biography of Perfume through AllMusic, selected the song as one of the group's best recordings in their discography.

== Promotion ==
To promote the single, the group selected "Next Stage with You" as the theme song for the Japanese launch of the Mercedes-Benz A-Class in November 2015. A short music video commercial was directed and designed by Japanese anime director Yoshiyuki Sadamoto; it features digitised versions of Perfume dancing in a spacey-atmosphere, and ends with them driving in a Mercedes-Benz with a male robot. It premiered on the Mercedes-Benz Japan YouTube channel on November 25, 2015. A further presentation promoting the single and vehicle was held in Tokyo, Japan, with an extended version of the commercial video being shown and Perfume appearing in a silver Mercedes-Benz; the entire project was titled "Mercedes-Benz X Perfume". It was uploaded on their YouTube channel two days later.

A special edition of the Mercedes-Benz A180 model, which was titled the "Perfume Edition", included triangular vinyl stickers that matches the color scheme of the group's outfit that was performed in the commercial. A total of 30 cars including these vinyl stickers were manufactured in Japan, and were only available through online purchase. Then on January 6, 2016, a mobile app was released and distributed on iTunes Store by Mercedes-Benz Ltd. in Japan; the application includes the original demo version of "Next Stage With You", and a camera function where the customer can take a photo of the Mercedes-Benz A180 model and use specific parts of the car as the stage for the digitised Perfume (that was used for the commercial video) to dance in. A special website was then created to host several different versions of the digitised Perfume members dancing in different backgrounds and stages.

== Track listing ==
- Digital download
1. "Next Stage with You" – 4:39

== Personnel ==
Credits adapted from the CD liner notes of Cosmic Explorer.

Recording and management

- Recorded in 2015 at the Universal Music Japan Studios.
- Universal Music Japan, Perfume Records, Amuse Inc., Wrassle Records – management and record labels

Credits

- Ayano Ōmoto – vocals, background vocals
- Yuka Kashino – vocals, background vocals
- Ayaka Nishiwaki – vocals, background vocals
- Yasutaka Nakata – programming, producing, composing, arranging, songwriting, mixing
- Masahiro Kazumoto – executive producer
- Yoshiyuki Sadamoto – music video director

== Release history ==
Region	Date	Format	Label
Japan	November 25, 2015	Promotional airplay	Universal Music Japan; Perfume Records
Japan	April 6, 2016	Digital download (Note: The single was not released as a separate digital-download track (apart from Amazon.com), and the links referenced to each country direct to the Cosmic Explorer album on iTunes Store.)	Universal Music Japan; Perfume Records; Wrassle Records
Australia	April 6, 2016	Digital download	Universal Music Japan; Perfume Records; Wrassle Records
New Zealand	April 6, 2016	Digital download	Universal Music Japan; Perfume Records; Wrassle Records
United Kingdom	April 6, 2016	Digital download	Universal Music Japan; Perfume Records; Wrassle Records
Ireland	April 6, 2016	Digital download	Universal Music Japan; Perfume Records; Wrassle Records
Germany	April 6, 2016	Digital download	Universal Music Japan; Perfume Records; Wrassle Records
Spain	April 6, 2016	Digital download	Universal Music Japan; Perfume Records; Wrassle Records
France	April 6, 2016	Digital download	Universal Music Japan; Perfume Records; Wrassle Records
Italy	April 6, 2016	Digital download	Universal Music Japan; Perfume Records; Wrassle Records
Taiwan	April 6, 2016	Digital download	Universal Music Japan; Perfume Records; Wrassle Records
