= Flashlight (disambiguation) =

A flashlight is a portable self-contained electric spotlight, also known as a torch.

Flashlight or flash light or Flash Light may also refer to:

- Flash (photography), or the flashlight, a device used for instantaneous illumination during picture taking
- Flashlight fish (disambiguation), a common name for several fishes
- The photophore, beside the eye of certain fish=
- Mechanically powered flashlight which are powered by your hands and is very similar to battery flashlights

== Military ==
- Yakovlev Yak-25, a Soviet military jet which NATO designates as "Flashlight"
- Yakovlev Yak-27, NATO designation "Flashlight-C"

== Media ==
- The Flashlight, a 1917 silent film starring Lon Chaney, Sr.
- "Flashlight" (MacGyver), an episode of MacGyver

== Literature ==
- Flashlight (novel), a 2025 novel by Susan Choi

== Music ==
=== Albums ===
- Flash Light (album), a 1987 album by Tom Verlaine
- Flashlights (album), a 2007 album by the band Y-O-U

=== Songs ===
- "Flash Light" (song), a 1977 song by Parliament
- "Flashlight" (DJ Fresh song), a 2014 song by DJ Fresh featuring Ellie Goulding
- "Flashlight" (R3hab and Deorro song), a 2014 single by Dutch DJ R3hab and Mexican-American DJ Deorro
- "Flashlight" (Jessie J song), a song recorded for the soundtrack to the film Pitch Perfect 2 (2015)
- "Flashlight" (Kasia Moś song), a 2017 song by Kasia Moś
- "Flashlight", a song by Hunter Hayes from Storyline
- "Flashlight", a 1994 single by Fuzzy
- "Flashlight", a song by The Front Bottoms from The Front Bottoms
- "Flashlight", a song by Chris Young from Neon

== See also ==
- Flash Lite, a lightweight version of Adobe Flash Player
- Flash (disambiguation)
- Fleshlight, a sex toy for men
- Torch (disambiguation)
