= Sweet Refrain =

Single by Perfume

from the album Cosmic Explorer
- B-side: "Koi wa Zenkei Shisei"
- Released: November 27, 2013
- Recorded: 2013
- Genre: Dance-pop; dubstep
- Length: 4:53
- Label: Universal J
- Songwriter: Yasutaka Nakata
- Producer: Yasutaka Nakata

Perfume singles chronology
"Magic of Love" (2013)	"Sweet Refrain" (2013)	"Cling Cling" (2014)

Music video
- "Sweet Refrain" on YouTube

"Sweet Refrain" is a song by Japanese girl group Perfume, the first single released for their fifth studio album Cosmic Explorer. The song was produced and written by longtime collaborator Yasutaka Nakata. Unlike the group's previous efforts, the song introduces different elements of dance-pop and dubstep. The single was released both physically and digitally on November 27, 2013.

== Composition and release ==
Musically, "Sweet Refrain" is a dance-pop song that has recurring elements of dubstep. According to Popdust, the said "It sees the group heading into a new direction by adding heavy dubstep wibbles and wobbles to their signature electro-pop sound." The article compared works to Kyary Pamyu Pamyu saying "Instead of shoving the brostep beats into an obnoxious drop or breakdown like their producer, Yasutaka Nakata, did on Kyary Pamyu Pamyu’s “Invader Invader,” it's slipped in on the pre-chorus and then pulled back — it sounds quite serious and foreboding, which makes it extra unexpected when Perfume flies into a twinkly bubblegum hook [...]".

The song was announced as the theme song of TV Asahi drama Toshi Densetsu no Onna 2, which started broadcasting on October 11, 2013. Following this, a short "Drama Ver." edition of the song was made available on Japanese site Recocchoku. The song, however, was not included in the final track listing of Perfume's fourth studio album, Level3. It was subsequently confirmed that the song would be released digitally and physically in Japan on November 27, 2013, and the artwork of the singles were revealed not long after.

== Music video ==
The full music video was uploaded on November 4, 2013, on the group's YouTube profile. The video opens with the girls sitting down in a white-colored art space holding analog clocks. As the camera pans around the room in a long take, the girls are multiplied on screen as they pose and perform dance moves.

== Track listings ==
- CD
1. "Sweet Refrain"
2. "Koi wa Zenkei Shisei" (恋は前傾姿勢)
3. "Sweet Refrain" (original instrumental)
4. "Koi wa Senkei Shisei" (original instrumental)
- DVD
1. "Sweet Refrain" (video clip)
