= Cling Cling =

Single by Perfume

from the album Cosmic Explorer
- B-side: "Hold Your Hand"; "DISPLAY"; "いじわるなハロー"
- Released: July 16, 2014
- Recorded: 2014
- Genre: Polka; techno-pop; dubstep; electro dance
- Length: 31:39; 4:17
- Label: Universal J
- Songwriter: Yasutaka Nakata
- Producer: Yasutaka Nakata

Perfume singles chronology
| "Sweet Refrain" (2013) | "Cling Cling" (2014) | "Relax In The City (Pick Me Up)" (2015) |

Music videos
- "Cling Cling" on YouTube
- "Display" on YouTube
- "Hold your Hand" on YouTube

"Cling Cling" is a song by Japanese girl group Perfume, the second for their fifth album Cosmic Explorer. It was released as a single in Japan on July 16, 2014. The B-side "Hold Your Hand" was released as a digital single on May 21, 2014.

== Music videos ==
=== Cling Cling ===
The music video for "Cling Cling" was created with an "Oriental" concept. It is set in an underground world where various eras and cultures are mixed. The members of Perfume appear wearing two different sets of outfits. The video was directed by Daisuke Shimada. The film set was designed by art director Yōhei Taneda. The role of the young girl was played by Momoe Mori.

=== Display ===
The music video for "Display" was produced in collaboration with Panasonic. It was shot in 4K resolution at 60 frames per second. Images from three different sets were simultaneously combined, making use of motion control cameras.

== Track listings ==
All tracks are written by Yasutaka Nakata.

Digital EP and regular CD maxi single
| No. | Title | Length |
|---|---|---|
| 1. | "Cling Cling" | 4:17 |
| 2. | "Hold Your Hand" | 3:35 |
| 3. | "DISPLAY" | 3:48 |
| 4. | "いじわるなハロー" ("Ijiwaruna Hello") | 4:07 |

Limited edition CD maxi single
| No. | Title | Length |
|---|---|---|
| 1. | "Cling Cling" | 4:17 |
| 2. | "Hold Your Hand" | 3:35 |
| 3. | "DISPLAY" | 3:48 |
| 4. | "いじわるなハロー" ("Ijiwaruna Hello") | 4:07 |
| 5. | "Cling Cling" (original instrumental) |
| 6. | "Hold Your Hand" (original instrumental) |
| 7. | "DISPLAY" (original instrumental) |
| 8. | "いじわるなハロー" ("Ijiwaruna Hello") (original instrumental) |

Limited edition bonus DVD
| No. | Title | Length |
|---|---|---|
| 1. | "Cling Cling" (video clip) |
| 2. | "Cling Cling" (Teaser) |
| 3. | "DISPLAY" (short version) (video clip) |
| 4. | "「Perfume FES!! 2014」3/15〜4/11ダイジェスト" |

Limited edition (box + photo booklet) bonus DVD
| No. | Title | Length |
|---|---|---|
| 5. | "西脇家メモリアル「スパイス」「SHINING☆STAR」" |

== Charts ==
Weekly chart performance for "Cling Cling"
| Chart (2014) | Peak position |
|---|---|
| Japan (Japan Hot 100) | 2 |
| Japan (Oricon) | 2 |

Annual chart rankings for "Cling Cling"
| Chart (2014) | Rank |
|---|---|
| Japan Adult Contemporary (Billboard) | 72 |

== Certifications ==
| Region | Certification | Certified units/sales |
|---|---|---|
| Japan (RIAJ) | Gold | 100,000^{^} |
^{^} Shipments figures based on certification alone.
