= Flashing =

Flashing may refer to:

== Technology ==
- Firmware § Flashing, overwriting an EEPROM or flash module in a device
  - BIOS flashing, overwriting a BIOS image
- Flashing (cinematography), a technique that desaturates the color so that one sees more in shadowed areas
- Flashing (weatherproofing), construction material used to prevent the passage of water around objects
- Flash evaporation, causing evaporation by lowering a fluid's pressure below its vapour pressure
- Flashing light, such as a light bulb or computer's cursor
- Flash (manufacturing), excess material attached to a moulded product which must usually be removed

== Other ==
- Flashing (horse)
- Flashing, a 1981 album by Himiko Kikuchi
- Flashing, or exposing, one's intimate parts; see Exhibitionism
  - or Indecent exposure, inappropriate public nudity
- Headlight flashing, to alert other drivers

== See also ==
- Flash (disambiguation)
