= Star Train =

Single by Perfume

from the album Cosmic Explorer
- B-side: "Tokimeki Lights" / "Imitation World"
- Released: October 28, 2015
- Recorded: 2015
- Genre: J-pop
- Label: Universal J
- Songwriter: Yasutaka Nakata
- Producer: Yasutaka Nakata

Perfume singles chronology
"Relax in the City (Pick Me Up)" (2015)	"Star Train" (2015)	"FLASH" (2016)

Music video
- "Star Train" on YouTube

"Star Train" is a single by Japanese trio Perfume, released in Japan on October 28, 2015. It is the fourth single from their fifth studio album Cosmic Explorer.

"Star Train" was used as the title track of Perfume's own documentary, titled WE ARE Perfume -WORLD TOUR 3rd DOCUMENT, released in both Japan and the US on October 31, 2015.

== Background ==
Star Train was released to celebrate their 15 anniversary since their formation. The single was released in 2 separate discs, a CD+DVD Limited Edition and a regular version CD. One of the B-side of the single, "Imitation World" was only included in the limited version. A music video of the song was included in the DVD.

== Track listings ==
All tracks are written by Yasutaka Nakata. Lyrics for "Imitation World" originally written by Emi Kinoko but credited to Nakata.

Digital and Regular CD single release
No.	Title	Length
1.	"Star Train"
2.	"Tokimeki Lights"

Maxi CD single release
No.	Title	Length
3.	"イミテーションワールド (Imitation World)"
4.	"Star Train -Original Instrumental-"
5.	"Tokimeki Lights -Original Instrumental-"
6.	"イミテーションワールド (Imitation World) -Original Instrumental-"

All tracks are written by Yasutaka Nakata.

DVD+Maxi single combo release
No.	Title	Length
7.	"Star Train -Video Clip-"
8.	"Perfume View ※ Making-of footage for the 'STAR TRAIN' PV"

== Certifications ==
Region	Certification	Certified units/sales
Japan (RIAJ)	Gold	100,000^{^}
^{^} Shipments figures based on certification alone.
