= Cosmic Explorer =

- Standard CD and digital artwork

Studio album by Perfume
- Released: April 6, 2016
- Recorded: August 2013 – December 2015
- Genre: Electronic music; EDM
- Language: Japanese
- Label: Universal J; Perfume Records
- Producer: Yasutaka Nakata

Perfume chronology
Level3 (2013)	Cosmic Explorer (2016)	Future Pop (2018)

Singles from Cosmic Explorer
- 1. "Sweet Refrain" Released: November 27, 2013; 2. "Cling Cling" Released: July 16, 2014; 3. "Relax in the City/Pick Me Up" Released: April 29, 2015; 4. "Star Train" Released: October 28, 2015; 5. "Flash" Released: March 16, 2016 (digital single)

Cosmic Explorer (stylized in all uppercase) is the fifth studio album by Japanese girl group Perfume. It was released on April 6, 2016 by Universal Music Japan, Universal J, and Perfume Records. It is Perfume's fifth consecutive album to be fully produced, written, composed, and arranged by Japanese musician and Capsule band member Yasutaka Nakata. Five different formats were released to promote the album: a standalone CD, a double CD and DVD/Blu-ray box set, a digital release and a double disc vinyl, where the first disc is blue and the second disc could be orange, pink or yellow. The vinyls were available for purchase at Perfume: A Gallery Experience Supported by Rhizomatiks in London and NY.

Upon the album's release, it was met with favorable reviews from music critics. They praised the album's composition and sound, and also highlighted several songs from the album. However, some noted that the material and commercial appeal of the songs were repetitive and predictable since their last albums. Five singles and one promotional single were released from the album.

== Background and composition ==
Cosmic Explorer is an electronic dance album, and Perfume's first studio album since Level 3 (2013). It is also their longest album in production since Level 3, which spanned a total of two and a half years. Perfume and their record labels Universal Music Japan, Universal J, and Perfume Records hired Japanese musician and Capsule member Yasutaka Nakata to compose, produce, write, and arrange the then-upcoming album. This marks the group's fifth consecutive studio album to be handled exclusively by Nakata. It was also his only exclusively produced studio album inside of 2016. (Note: Nakata fully produced Perfume's five studio albums and their compilation album Perfume: Complete Best. However, the latter is not considered to be a studio album despite previously released work and new songs.) Five of the album's tracks: "Flash", "Sweet Refrain", "Tokimeki Lights", "Star Train", and "Cling Cling" were re-arranged by Nakata for the release, whilst a bonus CD on the album includes the original single edit for "Flash".

== Songs ==
Following the album's instrumental introduction, "Navigate", the album opens with the title track "Cosmic Explorer"; a stadium EDM anthem designed to invoke the infinite possibilities of space, representing how Perfume perceive their future. "Miracle Worker" and "Next Stage with You" are described as "synth-drive" tracks that are both divided with singing and instrumental sections. The album's fifth track, "STORY", was originally performed at the 2015 SXSW Festival in Austin, Texas; it is a big room house song with "dark" and "industrial" elements. Erin Smith from Hello Asia noted that the darker elements of the song "aren't quite in sync with the sweet and catchy ditties Perfume are known for, but this direction suits them just as well..." "Sweet Refrain", one of the previously released tracks to receive an album mix, is a four-on-the-floor song which received mixed reviews upon its initial release in 2013. The album's eighth track, "Baby Face", was described as dance song with "cute" and "sweet" atmospheric elements.

"Tokimeki Lights" is the ninth track, and was the B-side to the group's single "Star Train", also included on the album. "Tokimeki Lights" was highlighted as one of the album's best tracks. The remixed version of "Cling Cling" received mixed reviews; some critics found it also unnecessary, whilst some commended the song's "unpredictable" bass modulation and Auto-tune elements.

== Release and packaging ==
Cosmic Explorer was released on April 6, 2016 by Universal Music Japan, Universal J, and Perfume Records in four different formats. The stand-alone CD, released physically in most territories, featured the 14 tracks in a jewelcase, while the double CD and DVD/Blu-Ray bundle featured the 14 tracks in a large box set case. The second disc features the original edit of "Flash", plus the instrumental and a radio show where the members of Perfume discuss the album. A bonus DVD included two music videos (for "Flash" and "Hold Your Hand") and two live performances. The final format is the digital release, which was released worldwide.

Cosmic Explorer has two different covers, photographed by Hiroshi Manaka. The stand-alone CD and digital cover is a background shot of Perfume's faces, with each member standing and leaning against the image, blocking one of their eyes. Both the deluxe edition covers features reflected images of the members, placed in front of a blue and white backdrop. Several objects, including a telephone, lamp, and shoes are also reflected and mirrored across from each side of the image. The booklet and photo shoot were designed and directed by Yuni Yoshida.

== Critical response ==
Professional ratings
Review scores
Source	Rating
Hello Asia	(8/10)

Upon its release, Cosmic Explorer received favorable reviews from most music critics. Erin Smith from Hello Asia was very positive in her review, awarding the album eight marks out of 10. Smith observed that Perfume "have spent the past 13-odd years honing their signature sound and performance", and stated that "it’s obvious in the quality and consistency of Cosmic Explorer that their years of experience haven’t gone to waste." She commended the song's mixture of genres, but said that "As a result of Perfume’s often repetitive songwriting style, the pervasive use of common dance tempos and the fact that Perfume’s songs average on the longer end of radio-friendly pop tracks, the record can get a little predictable and monotonous at times." However, she concluded "Cosmic Explorer is another great example of what this powerful trio are capable of."

Rolling Stone placed the album at number 16 on its "Best Pop Albums of 2016" list.

== Commercial performance ==
On the album's first day of sales, Cosmic Explorer debuted at number one on Japan's Oricon Daily Albums Chart, with Oricon charting that it had sold 60,858 units on the first day. The album debuted at number one on Japan's Oricon Weekly Albums Chart, with over 122,732 units sold in its first week of sales. It became the group's fifth consecutive studio album to top that chart, but resulted as their lowest first-week sales to date, in part due to the increasing amount of digital sales in Japan over the past few years. The album debuted the first place on iTunes Electronic Album Charts in 11 countries: USA, Canada, Mexico, Brazil, Taiwan, Hong Kong, Singapore, Thailand, Indonesia, Vietnam, New Zealand.

== Promotion ==
=== Singles ===
"Sweet Refrain" was released as the album's lead single on November 27, 2013. Upon its release, it garnered mixed reviews from music critics. Many critics commended the song's composition and the bass sound, while some criticized its production. "Sweet Refrain" was successful in Japan, peaking at number three on the Oricon Singles Chart. It also reached number two on Billboard's Japan Hot 100 chart. The accompanying music video for the single was shot by Kazuaki Seki; it features the group in a museum, where they are portrayed as repeating their actions on loop, with mirror images of themselves appearing throughout.

"Cling Cling" was released as the album's second single on July 16, 2014. Upon its release, it garnered mixed reviews from music critics. Many critics commended the song's composition, while some criticized its production. "Cling Cling" was successful in Japan, peaking at number two on the Oricon Singles Chart. It also reached number two on Billboard's Japan Hot 100 chart. It was certified gold by the Recording Industry Association of Japan (RIAJ) for shipments of 100,000 units. The accompanying music video for the single was shot by Shimada Daisuke; it features the group in a Chinese market place, dancing to the song.

"Relax in the City" and "Pick Me Up" were released as the album's third singles and only double a-side single on April 25, 2015. Upon its release, it garnered mixed reviews from music critics. though, "Pick Me Up" was praised for its mixture of genres. "Pick Me Up" was praised for its comparisons between the works of Calvin Harris and Avicii, being a prominent mixture of both Eurodance and Japanese pop music. The song uses instrumentation of acoustic guitars and keyboard riffs. Charting together, both singles were successful in Japan, peaking at number two on the Oricon Singles Chart. The former track reached number two on Billboard's Japan Hot 100 chart, whilst the latter track peaked at number 69. An accompanying music video for each single was shot; the first song features the group inside of a see-through house near an ocean, while the second song has Perfume dancing in a city.

"Star Train" was released as the album's fourth single on October 28, 2015. Upon its release, it garnered mixed reviews from music critics. Many critics commended the song's production, while some felt it was a weaker track from the album. "Star Train" was successful in Japan, peaking at number four on the Oricon Singles Chart. It also reached number two on Billboard's Japan Hot 100 chart. It was certified gold by RIAJ for shipments of 100,000 units. The accompanying music video for the single was shot by Seki; it features the group watching scenes from their 2015 documentary film, We Are Perfume.

"Flash" was released as the album's fifth single on March 16, 2016. The song performed exceedingly well in Japan, reaching number 2 on Billboard's Japan Hot 100 chart. The accompanying music video for the single was shot by Seki; it features the group performing the song in a grey-beige room. "Flash" has been described as a "party-starter" anthem that was noted by Alex Shenmue of Land of the Rising Sound as the album's most consistent arrangement.

Out of all the four physical singles, "Cling Cling" and "Star Train" were the only ones which received gold certifications from the RIAJ for shipments of over a hundred thousand copies. "Flash" is certified platinum by RIAJ for over 250,000 digital downloads.

=== Other charted songs ===
"Hold Your Hand" was released as a B-side track to "Cling Cling". The song has performed moderately in Japan, reaching number 41 on Billboard's Japan Hot 100 chart. The accompanying music video, included on the bonus DVD/Blu-Ray edition, features the group, and their fans, holding their palms up towards the camera with the song's lyrics on them. The track features as Cosmic Explorer's closer, to which Erin Smith said, "...seems a little anticlimactic after so many established hits – with a slightly slower tempo and a fairly steady build with little dynamic variation, while certainly not a bad song, it doesn’t seem the ideal choice for a record closer."

=== Concert tour ===
On February 14, 2016, Perfume confirmed their nationwide tour with the same name of the album. The group also confirmed their extension into North America, the group's first concert tour in that region.

== Track listing ==
All tracks are written by Yasutaka Nakata.

No.	Title	Length
1.	"Navigate"	1:19
2.	"Cosmic Explorer"	5:22
3.	"Miracle Worker"	3:40
4.	"Next Stage with You"	4:39
5.	"Story"	5:44
6.	"Flash" (Album mix)	4:35
7.	"Sweet Refrain" (Album mix)	4:41
8.	"Baby Face"	4:00
9.	"Tokimeki Lights" (Album mix)	4:24
10.	"Star Train" (Album mix)	4:42
11.	"Relax in the City"	4:12
12.	"Pick Me Up"	3:49
13.	"Cling Cling" (Album mix)	3:53
14.	"Hold Your Hand"	3:36
Total length:		58:36

Limited edition "Special CD"
No.	Title	Length
1.	"Flash"	4:38
2.	"Flash" (Original Instrumental)	4:42
3.	"Perfume no Tada Tada Radio ga Suki dakara Radio! 2"	54:55

International license edition bonus track
No.	Title	Length
15.	"Flash" (bonus track)	4:38

Limited edition "Special Blu-ray/DVD"
No.	Title	Length
1.	"Flash" (music video)	4:38
2.	"Hold Your Hand" (lyric video)	3:36
3.	"Cling Cling" (2014-7-14 Perfume "Cling Cling" World @ Harajuku Astro Hall) (live video)	4:00
4.	"2015-12-31 66th NHK Kohaku Uta Gassen -Pick Me Up- Behind the Scenes Document" (behind the scenes)	13:34

== Charts ==
Chart (2016)	Peak position
Japanese Daily Albums (Oricon)	1
Japanese Weekly Albums (Oricon)	1
South Korean Weekly Albums (Gaon)	36
South Korean Weekly International Albums (Gaon)	5
US Billboard Top Dance/Electronic Albums	16

== Certifications ==
Region	Certification	Certified units/sales
Japan (RIAJ)	Gold	100,000^{^}
^{^} Shipments figures based on certification alone.
