= The Flash (lake) =

Lake near Wrexham, Wales

- Gresford Flash
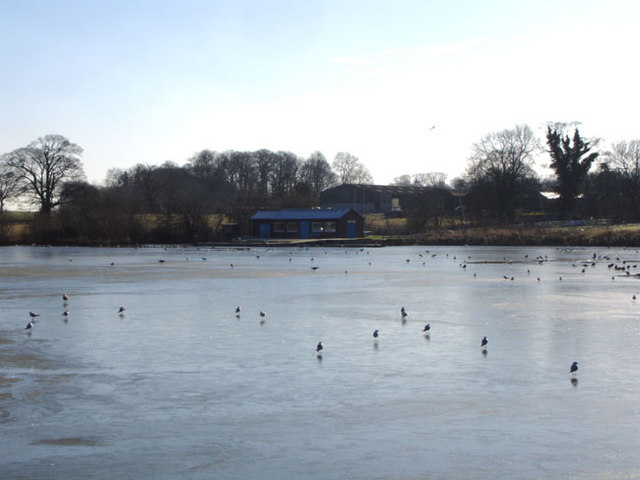
- The Flash in winter

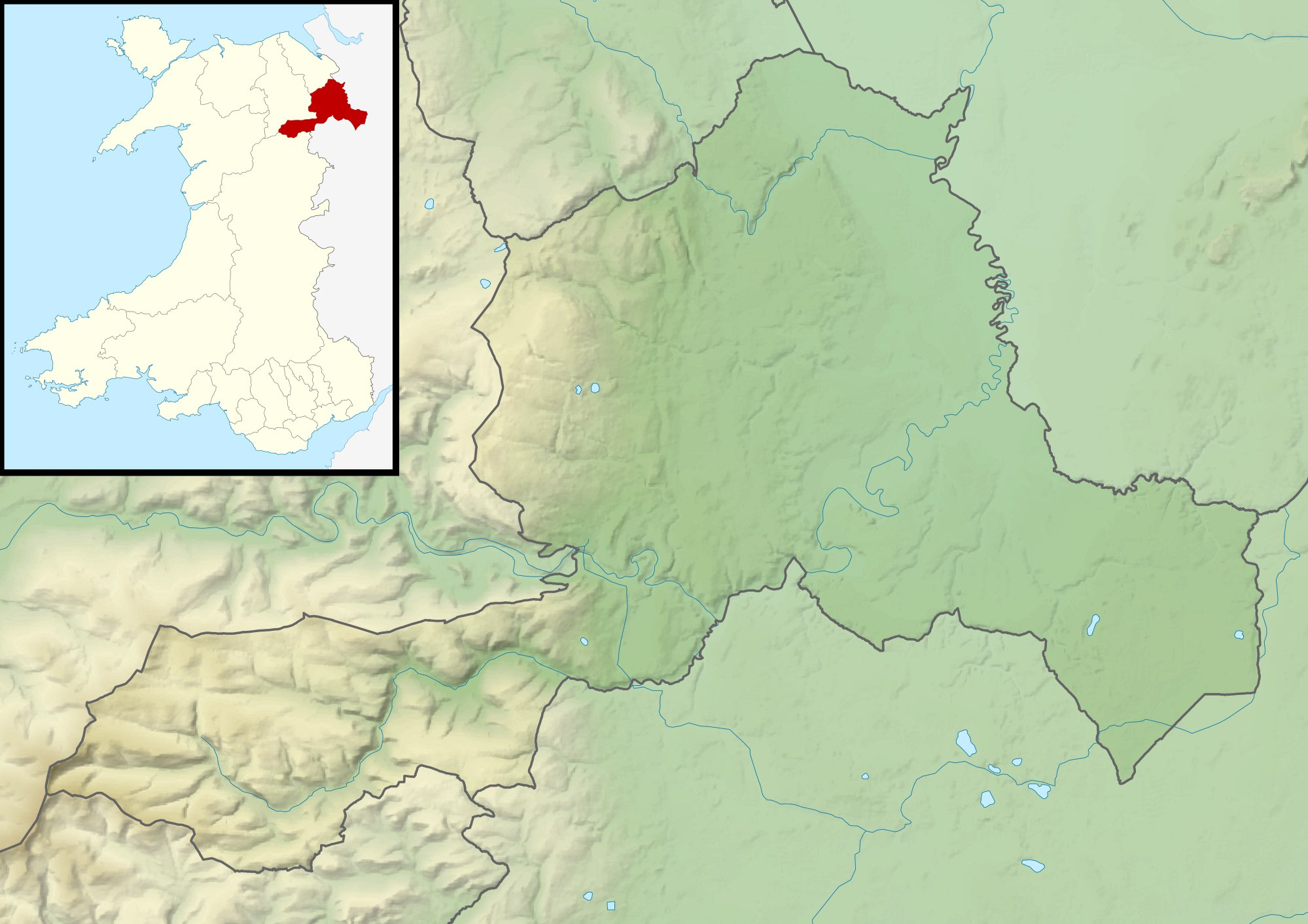
- Location within Wrexham
- Location: Wales
- Coordinates: 53.0760°N 2.9767°W
- Type: artificial lake

The Flash (Welsh: Y Flash or historically Pwll Gwenllian) or Gresford Flash is a lake located near Borras and Gresford, in Wrexham County Borough, Wales.

The Flash is an artificial lake which is commonly used for sailing and other recreational pursuits. The lake covers just under 50,000 square metres in an area between Gresford and Borras. Gresford Sailing Club based here, training and racing in small dinghies.
