= George Flash =

Israeli politician

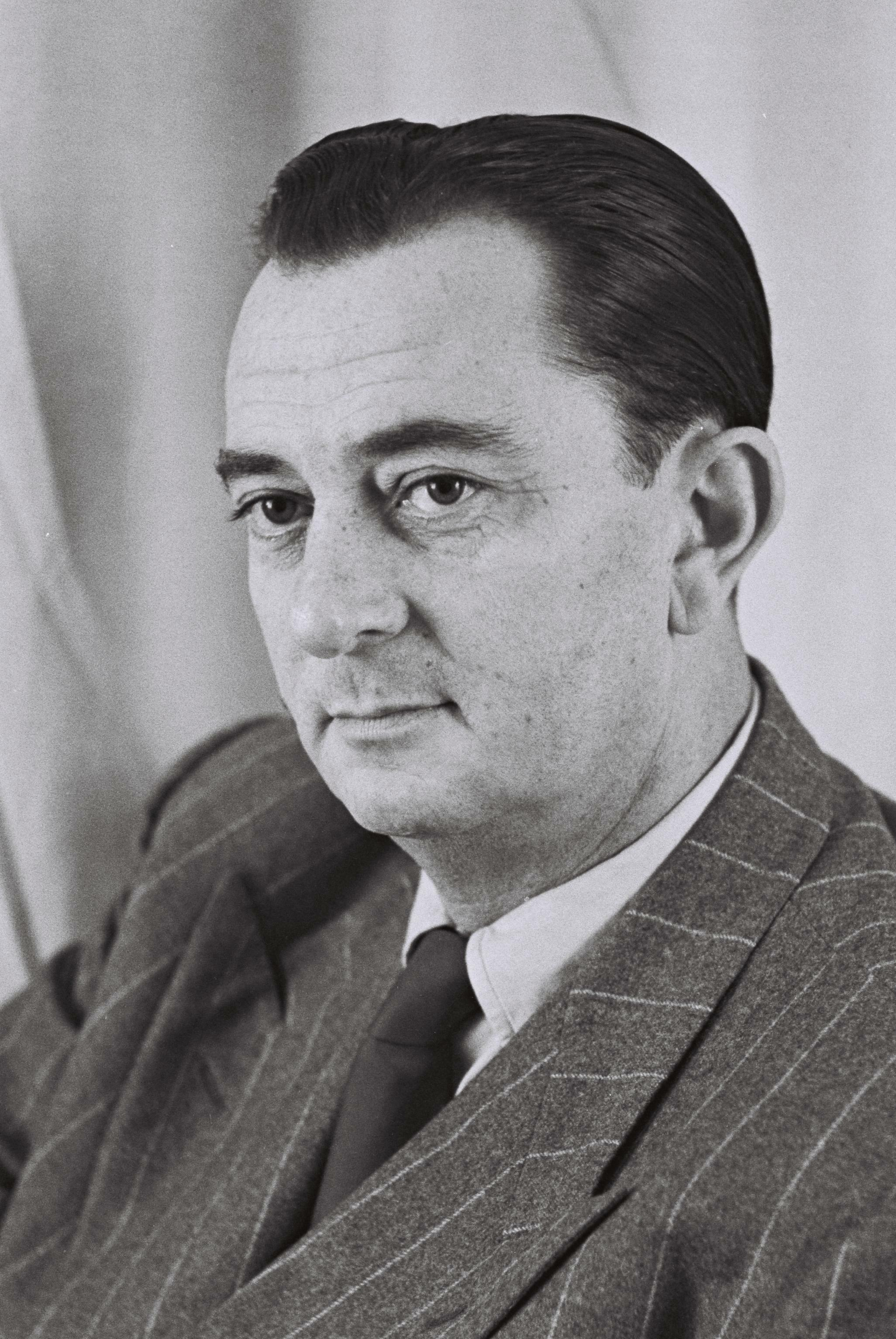
- Flash in 1951

Faction represented in the Knesset
- 1951–1955: General Zionists

Personal details
- Born: 1909 Reşiţa, Austria-Hungary
- Died: 22 November 1990 (aged 80–81)

George Flash (Hebrew: ג'ורג' פלש; 1909 – 22 November 1990) was an Israeli politician who served as a member of the Knesset for the General Zionists between 1951 and 1955.

== Biography ==
Born in Reșița in Austria-Hungary (today in Romania), Flash was educated at a Hebrew high school, before studying law at the University of Vienna. Whilst a student he became involved with Zionist organisations, and was a member of the Zionist Students Association. He also became a member of the directorate of Hakoah Vienna.

In 1933 he emigrated to Mandatory Palestine, where he became a member of the directorate of the Federation of General Zionists, and chairman of its foreign policy committee. He was also general secretary of the Israeli branch of Maccabi, later becoming chairman and chair of the Maccabi World directorate, and general secretary of the Citizens Union. During the mandate era, he served as a member of the Assembly of Representatives.

Prior to the 1951 Knesset elections he was placed eighteenth on the General Zionists' list, and was elected to the Knesset as the party won 20 seats. He was placed twenty-second on the party's list for the 1955 elections, and lost his seat as the party won only 13 seats.

He died in 1990.
