= Relax in the City/Pick Me Up =

"Relax In The City /Pick Me Up"

Single by Perfume

from the album Cosmic Explorer
- B-side: "Toumei Ningen"
- Released: April 29, 2015
- Recorded: 2015
- Genre: Dance-pop; techno-pop; eurodance; EDM
- Label: Universal J
- Songwriter: Yasutaka Nakata
- Producer: Yasutaka Nakata

Perfume singles chronology
"Cling Cling" (2014)	"Relax In The City /Pick Me Up" (2015)	"Star Train" (2015)

Music videos
- "Pick Me Up" on YouTube
- "Relax In The City" on YouTube

"Relax In The City / Pick Me Up" is a single by Japanese trio Perfume, released in Japan on April 26, 2015. It is the third single from their fifth studio album COSMIC EXPLORER. As individual tracks, Pick Me Up was released digitally on May 6, 2015. Relax In The City was released digitally on April 8, 2015.

== Music video ==
As a double A side, both tracks were released with music videos. The video for Pick Me Up, which features a cameo from American group OK Go, was released globally on March 31, 2015, with the video for Relax In The City following shortly after. A short version of Relax In The City was released on April 13, 2015, while a full-length music was released on May 12, 2015.

== Track listings ==
All tracks are written by Yasutaka Nakata.

Digital and Regular CD single release
No.	Title	Length
1.	"Relax In The City"	4:12
2.	"Pick Me Up"	3:51
3.	"透明人間 ("Toumei Ningen")(Invisible Human)"	3:40

All tracks are written by Yasutaka Nakata.

Maxi Single CD release
No.	Title	Length
4.	"Relax In The City -Original Instrumental-"	4:12
5.	"Pick Me Up -Original Instrumental-"	3:51
6.	"透明人間 -Original Instrumental-"	3:40

No.	Title	Length
7.	"Relax In The City -Video Clip-"
8.	"Relax In The City -Teaser-"
9.	"Pick Me Up -Video Clip-"
