= Flash (Perfume song) =

Promotional single by Perfume

from the album Cosmic Explorer
- Released: March 16, 2016
- Genre: J-pop, EDM
- Length: 4:36
- Label: Universal J; Perfume Records
- Producer(s): Yasutaka Nakata

Perfume singles chronology
"Star Train" (2015)	"Flash" (2016)	"Tokyo Girl" (2017)

"Flash" (stylized in all uppercase) is a single by Perfume, released on March 16, 2016. It is the fifth single from their fifth studio album Cosmic Explorer. The single reached first place in the real-time ranking of iTunes with 200,000+ downloads. It is also the band's highest selling single since "Love the World".

The single was used as the theme song for the live action adapted film Chihayafuru.

== Background ==
The single was sold digitally on iTunes, Recochoku, A! MUSIC and other music streaming sites. The digital jacket for it was drawn by Yuki Suetsugu. It was also included on the Cosmic Explorer album and was re-arranged. For the album's first limited edition, the original single edit and the instrumental came as a separate CD and the music video was included on the bonus Blu-ray/DVD.

The choreography for the song contains martial arts and Tai chi elements.

== Music video ==
The song also has a music video for it on YouTube with some CGI. It is their most watched video on YouTube with more than 60 million views. The music video is directed by Yusuke Tanaka based on the credits on the Cosmic Explorer album.

=== Synopsis ===
The video starts with the girls in a light and shadow projected room. The video randomly switches scenes from one member to all members dancing throughout the video. The drop before the second verse shows the girls walking to each other, walking in circles. When entering the second verse, the girls put their hands out one by one, holding each other before the pre-chorus, and back to circling again. The first hall of the bridge shows them dancing in slow motion. Going into the final chorus, the scenes with them dancing with the LED light sabers which are operated by their technology team, Rhizomatiks. The video ends with the girls doing the signature pose.

== Chart ==
Year	Chart	Peak position
2016	Billboard Japan Hot 100	2

== Certifications ==
Region	Certification	Certified units/sales
Japan (RIAJ)	Platinum	250,000^{*}
^{*} Sales figures based on certification alone.

== External ==
- Perfume FLASH – YouTube
- "Chihayafuru" movie theme song "FLASH" (Perfume) PV – YouTube
