= Red Five (band) =

American punk rock band from Los Angeles

- Origin: Los Angeles, California
- Genres: Punk rock; power pop
- Years active: 1994–1999
- Labels: Interscope
- Past members: Jenni McElrath; Betty Carmellini; Mitchell Townsend; Adam Zuckert; Greg Jones

Red Five was an American punk rock band from Los Angeles that was active from 1994 to 1999.

== History ==
Red Five was formed in Los Angeles in 1994 by singer and guitarists Jenni McElrath and Betty Carmellini, bassist Greg Jones, and drummer Adam Zuckert. Originally, McElrath was in a band called Honey Dust, while Carmellini, Jones, and Zuckert played in another band called Garbage Hearts. The band was named after Luke Skywalker's code name in the 1977 film Star Wars, which McElrath had rented at the time of the band's formation. After gaining a club following in Los Angeles and releasing an EP on an independent record label, the band signed a contract with Interscope to record their debut album, Flash. Jones left the band shortly after the recording sessions were completed to play in his other band Mr. Mirainga, where he thought he would have a more prominent songwriting role. He was replaced by bassist Mitchell Townsend, who played in an Orange County band called Pull. Flash was released on June 18, 1996, roughly one year after it was recorded.

Red Five's first 7-inch (18 cm) single, "Space", was released in 1995. The band was associated with acts such as 7 Year Bitch, L7 and Veruca Salt, and performed in several low-budget tours, including the 1995 and 1996 Warped Tours. During the 1996 Warped Tour, fans could win a skateboard signed by the band at several retail stores. The band was considered one of the most commercially promising acts that had emerged from Southern California, with SideOneDummy Records co-owner Bill Armstrong stating in 1996 that they were "the best band to come out of L.A. in the [past] five years." After contributing to the soundtrack of the 1997 independent film Slaves to the Underground, the band recorded their second album, Wink, with producers Paul Q. Kolderie and Sean Slade. Before its intended release, Interscope released a single from the album to promote Converse sneakers in early 1999.

Wink was intended to be released in summer 1999, but Interscope ultimately decided to drop the band. According to McElrath, "Interscope [wanted] 'hits.' We made a good record and we were very happy with it. But they didn't hear it. We were not a 'schtick' band, we didn't care about fashion, we were only interested in making good, honest music. Sadly, that's not what they wanted anymore. Jimmy Iovine right before he dropped us, said we were his kids favourite band and we were the next 'big thing.' But that's life in the 'biz.' Zero loyalty. So enjoy it while it lasts." Despite being dropped, Red Five received the master tapes of Wink. Although the band broke up shortly after, the song "Shipwrecked" from Wink appeared on the 2002 film Orange County. In 2009, the band digitally released their entire catalog of songs, including those from Wink, in a collection titled Anthology 1993–1999.

== Members ==
- Jenni McElrath – vocals, guitar (1994–1999)
- Betty Carmellini – vocals, guitar (1994–1999)
- Mitchell Townsend – bass (1995–1999)
- Adam Zuckert – drums (1994–1999)
- Greg Jones – bass (1994–1995)

== Discography ==
Studio albums

- Flash (1996)
- Wink * Independent release (2009)

Singles

- "Space" (1995)

Compilations

- Anthology 1993–1999 (2009)
