= Future Pop (album) =

Studio album by Perfume
- Released: August 15, 2018
- Recorded: 2016–2018
- Genre: J-pop; dance; EDM; future bass
- Length: 42:09
- Label: Universal J; Perfume
- Producer: Yasutaka Nakata

Perfume chronology
Cosmic Explorer (2016)	Future Pop (2018)	Perfume the Best: P Cubed (2019)

Singles from Future Pop
- 1. "Tokyo Girl" Released: February 15, 2017; 2. "If You Wanna" Released: August 30, 2017; 3. "Mugen Mirai" Released: March 14, 2018; 4. "Let Me Know" Released: August 1, 2018 (digital download)

Future Pop is the sixth studio album by Japanese girl group Perfume, released on August 15, 2018 by Universal Music Japan sublabels Universal J and Perfume Records. The album debuted at the top spot of the Oricon Weekly Albums Chart with 79,282 copies on its first week of release, making it their seventh number-one album in Japan. The album also yielded its first number-one release on the Oricon Weekly Digital Albums chart with 7,396 downloads. The album comprises a total of twelve tracks, with three of them being released as maxi singles: "Tokyo Girl", "If You Wanna", and "Mugen Mirai", plus their respective B-sides "Houseki no Ame", "Everyday", and "Fusion", and six previously unreleased tracks, with one of them being the album's promotional single, "Let Me Know".

== Track listing ==
All songs written, arranged, and produced by Yasutaka Nakata.

No.	Title	Length
1.	"Start-Up"	0:54
2.	"Future Pop"	3:03
3.	"If You Wanna"	2:43
4.	"Tokyo Girl"	4:27
5.	"Fusion"	4:32
6.	"Tiny Baby"	3:41
7.	"Let Me Know"	3:25
8.	"Chorairin" (超来輪; Ultra Future Loop)	3:43
9.	"Mugenmirai" (無限未来; Infinite Future)	3:41
10.	"Housekino Ame" (宝石の雨; Rain of Jewels)	3:57
11.	"Tenku" (天空; Sky)	4:39
12.	"Everyday"	3:47
Total length:		42:09

Blu-ray/DVD bonus track list

No.	Title	Length
1.	"Tokyo Girl (video clip)"
2.	"If You Wanna (video clip)"
3.	"Everyday (video clip)"
4.	"無限未来 (Mugenmirai) (video clip)"
5.	"Let Me Know (video clip)"
6.	"Perfume No Tadatada Radio Ga Sukidakara Radio! 3"

Limited Edition Blu-ray/DVD bonus track list

No.	Title	Length
1.	"Tokyo Girl (video clip)"
2.	"If You Wanna (video clip)"
3.	"Everyday (video clip)"
4.	"無限未来 (Mugenmirai) (video clip)"
5.	"Let Me Know (video clip)"
6.	"Let Me Know –メイキング映像-"
7.	"Tokyo Girl (発売記念Special Live)"
8.	"If You Wanna (発売記念Special Live)"
9.	"Tokyo Girl (2017年12月31日 第68回NHK紅白歌合戦)"
10.	"Fusion (Perfume×Technology Presents "Reframe")"
11.	"Perfume No Tadatada Radio Ga Sukidakara Radio! 3"

== Charts ==
Chart (2018)	Peak position
Japanese Weekly Albums Chart (Oricon)	1
Japanese Weekly Digital Albums Chart (Oricon)	1
US World Albums (Billboard)	4

== Certifications ==
Region	Certification	Certified units/sales
Japan (RIAJ)	Gold	100,000^{^}
^{^} Shipments figures based on certification alone.
