= Fuji Rock Festival =

Annual music festival in Japan

Coordinates: 36°47′56.40″N 138°47′0.93″E

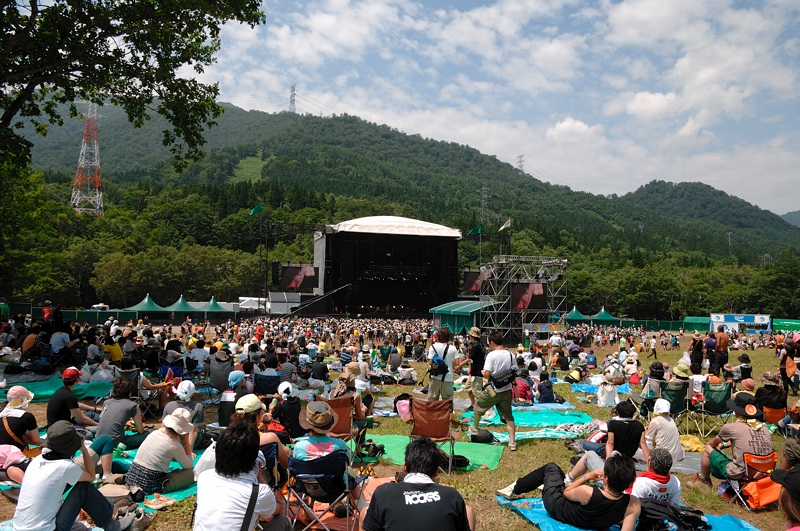
- Main stage, 2007
- Genre: Rock music, electronic music
- Dates: last weekend of July (3 days)
- Locations: Narusawa, Japan (1997); Tokyo, Japan (1998); Naeba, Japan (1999–present)
- Years active: 1997–present
- Website: Official site

Fuji Rock Festival (フジロックフェスティバル, Fuji Rokku Fesutibaru) is an annual music festival held in July at Naeba Ski Resort in Yuzawa, Niigata Prefecture, Japan. The three-day event, organized by Smash Japan, features more than 200 Japanese and international musicians, making it the largest outdoor music event in Japan and one of the country's major annual music festivals. In 2005, more than 100,000 people attended the festival.

Fuji Rock Festival is named so because the first event in 1997 was held at the base of Mount Fuji. The festival moved to Naeba Ski Resort in Niigata in 1999.

== Festival grounds ==
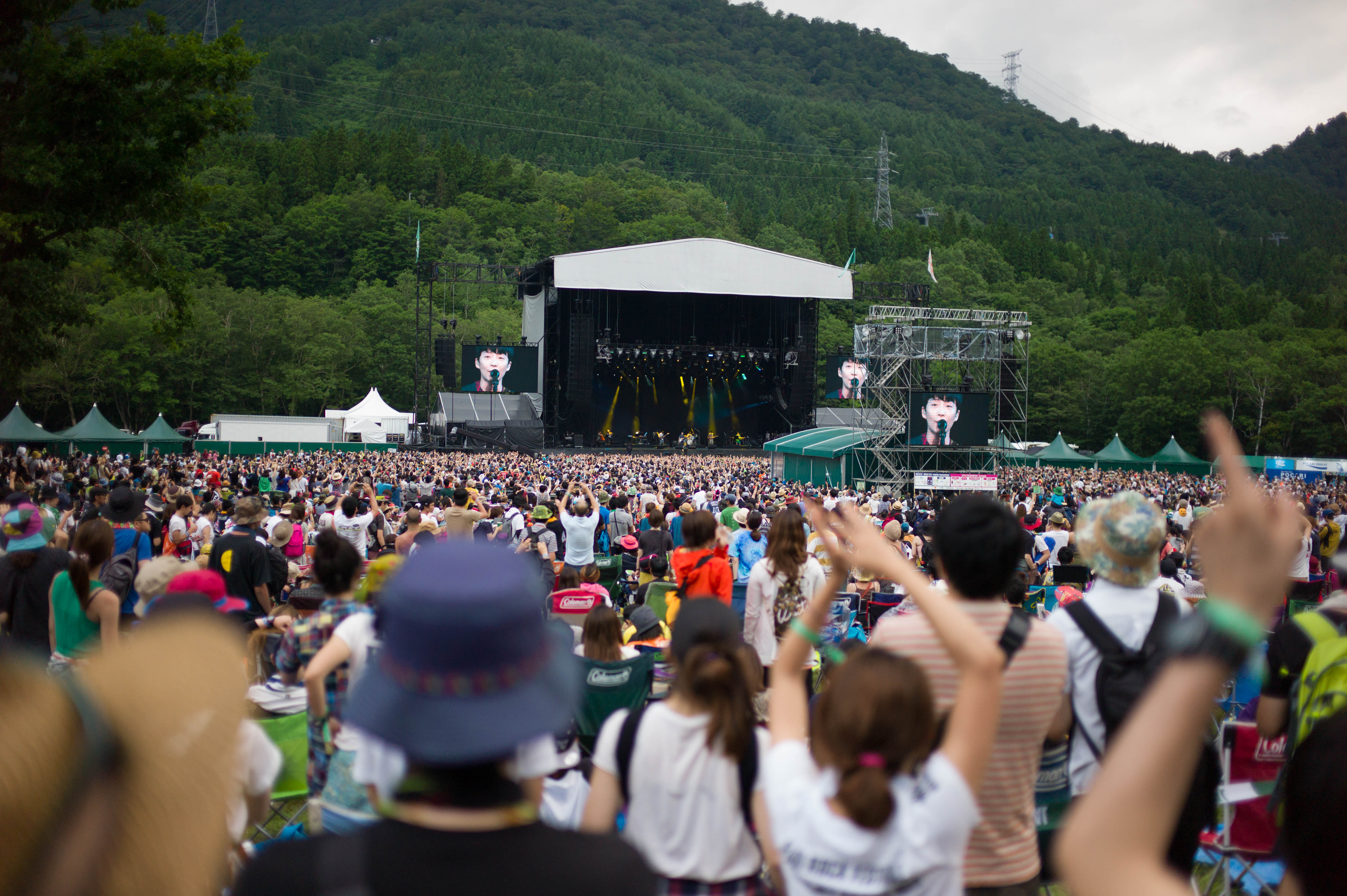
The Green Stage

There are seven main stages and other minor stages scattered throughout the site. The Green stage is the main stage and it has a capacity for almost 50,000 spectators. Other stages include the White Stage, the Red Marquee, Orange Court, and Field of Heaven. The walks between some of the stages can be long, and some of the trails can be hilly, but the walks are beautiful, often taking you through forests and over sparkling streams. Dragondola – the longest gondola lift in the world, carries festival goers up to the top of the mountain overlooking the festival site.

The hub of the site is called Oasis where more than 30 food stalls from around the world gather. The main site closes each night after the final act, but Oasis continues to stay open until late at night, as well as the Red Marquee where an all-night rave continues until 5am. The site re-opens at 9am.

The night before the festival (Thursday night) features an opening party which is free entry, featuring bon-odori (traditional Japanese folk dance), prize draws, food stalls and a fireworks display.

The festival's stated aim is to be "The cleanest festival in the world"; great effort is also put into recycling.

== Accommodation ==
Although Naeba, being a ski resort, offers a number of accommodation options such as hotels, ryokan and minshuku within walking distance of the festival site, competition for these is fierce and they tend to book out very quickly. Many festival goers find accommodation in nearby ski resorts such as Tashiro, Asagai and Mitsumata – the free shuttle bus linking JR Echigo-Yuzawa Station in the town of Yuzawa to the festival site can be used for these areas which are en route. Some even find accommodation in the numerous options available in Yuzawa itself. The shuttle bus takes between 40 minutes to an hour each way and runs until 2am each night.

Alternatively, there is a campsite on a golf course next to the festival site which costs ¥3,000 (2011) (equivalent to ¥3,442.33 or US$22.74 in 2024) for the weekend (2011), complete with toilets, showers and food stalls. About 17,000 festival goers choose to spend their nights here every year. The campsite is hilly in many places and flat spots are taken quickly, however, the manicured putting greens, which are the flattest areas are generally out of bounds to campers.

In previous years many took the option of sleeping rough – a relatively common practise amongst young Japanese during the warmer months thanks to a low crime rate – in the vicinity of the site and Echigo-Yuzawa Station, however this is now prohibited.

== Access ==
The festival is a free 40–60-minute shuttle bus ride from Echigo-Yuzawa Station (越後湯沢駅) in the town of Yuzawa, on the Jōetsu Shinkansen (上越新幹線) line which link it to Tokyo Station (東京駅) in about 90 minutes. JR Shinkansen ticket, Tokyo to Echigo-Yuzawa is ¥6,490 (2008) (equivalent to ¥7,271.85 or US$48.04 in 2024) one way (for a reserved seat). Car parking also available for ¥3,000 (2008) (equivalent to ¥3,361.41 or US$22.21 in 2024) per day at the festival site area.

== History ==
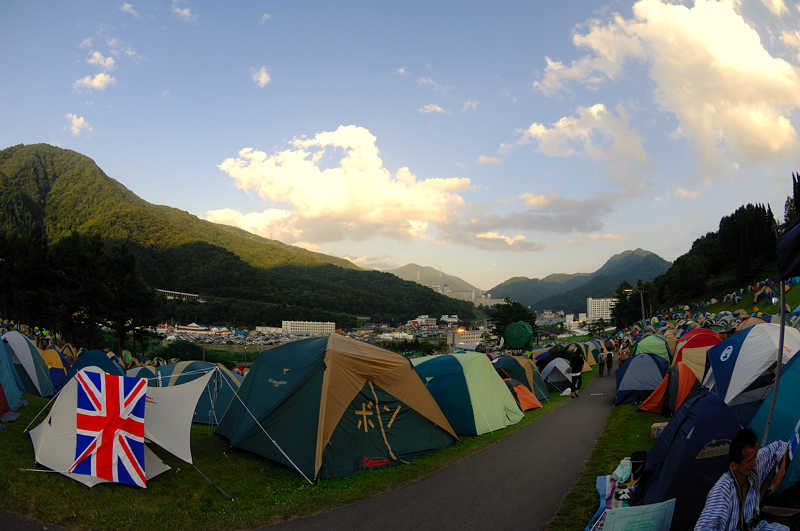
Campsite at Fuji Rock

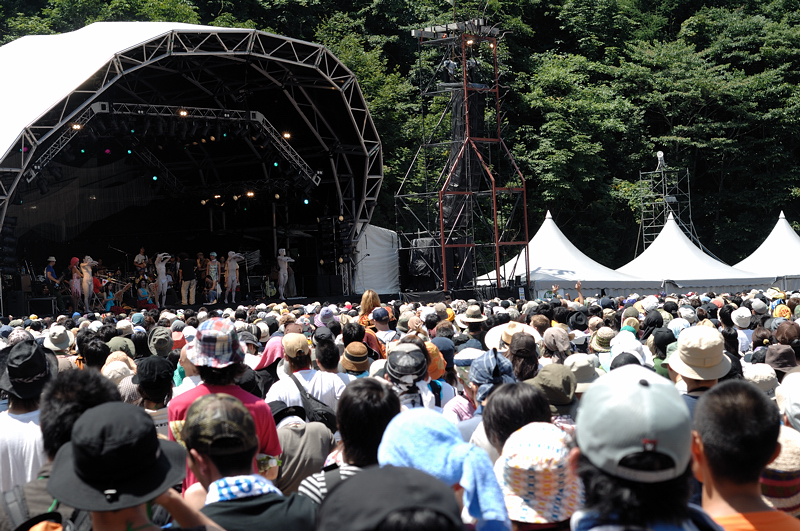
Field of Heaven

The first year of the festival, held on Tenjinyama Ski Resort near Mt Fuji (and hence the name), was a disaster. It was scheduled to be a two-day event, but by sheer bad luck the first day of the event was struck by a typhoon. The Red Hot Chili Peppers' headline set, played through a storm despite Anthony Kiedis having a broken arm, is almost legendary amongst Fuji Rock veterans. The festival-goers were poorly prepared for the heavy rain and strong winds, and many needed medical attention from hypothermia (although no deaths occurred). The organisers decided to cancel the second day of the event (which turned out to be sunny), and thus ended Japan's first outdoor rock festival. The organizers were criticized for being poorly prepared for bad weather, and for not organising enough buses to link the site to the nearest train station.

The second year, the festival moved to a temporary location in Toyosu, on Tokyo's waterfront. Although the event was a success, many found the searing heat of mid-summer Tokyo too much to bear, and it was decided that the next event was to return to the relative coolness of the mountains.

It was in 1999 the festival found its home in Naeba, Niigata prefecture. Naeba is not anywhere close to Mt. Fuji, however, the festival still retains its original name. After the horrific first year, the organizers have been running the festival smoothly up until present.

=== 2026 ===
The festival will be held from July 24 until 26. The headline acts will be the xx, Khruangbin and Massive Attack.

Green Stage
Friday	Saturday	Sunday
The xx Hi-Standard; Turnstile; Loyle Carner; My Hair is Bad; Route 17 Rock'n'Roll Orchestra; US	Khruangbin Fujii Kaze; Basement Jaxx; IO; Trueno; Bialystocks	Massive Attack Susumu Hirasawa + EJIＮ; Mogwai; Kneecap; Donavon Frankenreiter; Hirai Dai

White Stage
Friday	Saturday	Sunday
Asian Kung-Fu Generation Arlo Parks; Toro y Moi; Yo-Sea; Son Rompe Pera; KOTORI	Tomora XG; Joey Valence & Brae; Kroi; Bohemian Betyars; Riddim Saunter	Mitski Tempalay; Geordie Greep; Sofia Isella; Grapevine; Mono No Aware

Other major acts includes Hyukoh, Sunny Day Service, American Football, Snail Mail, Thurston Moore Group, The Beths, The Lemon Twigs, Ichiro Yamaguchi, Lettuce, BadBadNotGood, Never young beach, Ogre You Asshole, and more.

=== 2025 ===
The festival was held from July 25 until 27. The headline acts were Fred Again, Vulfpeck and Vampire Weekend. Attendance for the weekend was 122,000 guests, with both the Saturday single-day tickets and the three-day passes selling out. 2025 also saw the addition of a new stage, Orange Echo, and the closure of the Day Dreaming stage on top of the mountain.

Green Stage
Friday	Saturday	Sunday
Fred Again Vaundy; Hyukoh & Sunset Rollercoaster; Brahman; Route 17 Rock'n'Roll Orchestra; US	Vulfpeck Tatsuro Yamashita; James Blake; STUTS; Ohzora Kimishima; Ca7riel & Paco Amoroso	Vampire Weekend Radwimps; Little Simz; Creepy Nuts; Naotarō Moriyama; Red Hot Chilli Pipers

White Stage
Friday	Saturday	Sunday
Suchmos OK Go; Miyavi; Mdou Moctar; Ecca Vandal; Otoboke Beaver	Four Tet Barry Can't Swim; JJJ; Faye Webster; Balming Tiger; Fermin Muguruza	Haim Hitsujibungaku; Royel Otis; Motoharu Sano & The Coyote Band; Silica Gel; Mono No Aware

Other major acts included Tycho, Perfume Genius, Ichiko Aoba, Kiasmos, Ezra Collective, Sambomaster, Ginger Root, NewDad, Jane Remover, Ego-Wrappin', The Hives, English Teacher, Galactic, and Jake Shimabukuro.

=== 2024 ===
The festival was held from July 26 until 28. The headline acts were The Killers, Kraftwerk and Noel Gallagher's High Flying Birds.

Green Stage
Friday	Saturday	Sunday
~~SZA~~ The Killers Awich; Omar Apollo; Macaroni Empitsu; Friko; Route 17 Rock'n'Roll Orchestra; Indigo la End	Kraftwerk Beth Gibbons; Man with a Mission; 10-Feet; The Last Dinner Party; Tokyo Ska Paradise Orchestra	Noel Gallagher's High Flying Birds Zutomayo; Raye; CreepHyp; Rufus Wainwright; No Party for Cao Dong

White Stage
Friday	Saturday	Sunday
Peggy Gou ~~Remi Wolf~~ Hiroko Yamamura; Iri; Teddy Swims; Taeko Onuki; Lucky Kilimanjaro	Girl in Red Sampha; Quruli; Yuta Orisaka; The Bawdies; Syrup16g	Turnstile Kim Gordon toe The Jesus and Mary Chain; HEY-SMITH; Esne Beltza

Other major acts included Floating Points, King Krule, Denki Groove, Hiromi's Sonicwonder, 2manydjs, the Yussef Dayes Experience, Ride, Fontaines D.C., The Allman Betts Band, and George Porter Jr..

=== 2023 ===
The festival was held from July 28 until 30. The headline acts were The Strokes, Foo Fighters and Lizzo.

Green Stage
Friday	Saturday	Sunday
The Strokes Daniel Caesar; Eikichi Yazawa; Idles; Route 17 Rock'n'Roll Orchestra; Fever 333	Foo Fighters Ellegarden; Alanis Morissette; Hitsujibungaku; Benee; Gezan	Lizzo ~~Lewis Capaldi~~ Bad Hop; Yuki; Gryffin; Super Beaver never young beach

White Stage
Friday	Saturday	Sunday
NxWorries Denzel Curry; Tohji; Stuts; Sudan Archives; Oyat; Yona Yona Weekenders	Louis Cole Vaundy; Caroline Polachek; TESTSET; Dermot Kennedy; Itaca Band; Chilli Beans.	Weezer Ayano Kaneko; Black Midi; 100 gecs Domico; Stardust Revue; Homecomings

Other major acts included the Yeah Yeah Yeahs, Eastern Youth, Yves Tumor, Yo La Tengo, Cory Henry, Overmono, Ryoji Ikeda, Slowdive, Weyes Blood, Romy, Cory Wong, FKJ, Yard Act, and Ásgeir.

=== 2022 ===
The festival was held from July 29 until 31, and saw the return of international artists. The headline acts were Vampire Weekend, Jack White and Halsey.

Green Stage
Friday	Saturday	Sunday
Vampire Weekend ~~Yoasobi~~ Hiatus Kaiyote; Clammbon; Original Love; ~~Black Pumas~~ OAU; The Hu	Jack White Foals; Tokyo Ska Paradise Orchestra; Yuta Orisaka; Orange Range; Bloodywood	Halsey Tom Misch; Punpee; Route 17 Rock'n'Roll Orchestra; Japanese Breakfast go!go!vanillas

White Stage
Friday	Saturday	Sunday
Bonobo Jonas Blue; D.A.N. JPEGMafia; The Novembers; Doping Panda	Cornelius Dinosaur Jr. Glim Spanky; Snail Mail; Sherbets; Fire EX.	Mura Masa Zutomayo; Superorganism; Black Country, New Road; Masayuki Suzuki; ~~Oyat~~ Your Song Is Good; Kroi

Other major acts include: Syd, Awich, Dawes, Arlo Parks, Mogwai, Elephant Gym, and Hanaregumi. Many artists were forced to cancel their appearances due to contracting COVID-19 or other artist circumstances, including Black Pumas and Fontaines D.C..

=== 2021 ===
The festival was announced to be held from August 20 until 22 and, for the first time, the festival only included domestic artists due to the COVID-19 pandemic. The headline acts were Radwimps, King Gnu and Denki Groove.

Green Stage
Friday	Saturday	Sunday
Radwimps Man with a Mission; SiM; Quruli; Yonige; Okamoto's	King Gnu ~~Cornelius~~ Ken Yokoyama; The Cro-Magnons; Sambomaster; Sirup; Kemuri	Denki Groove Kiyoshiro Imawano Rock 'n' Forever tribute Misia; Motohiro Hata; Cero; Awesome City Club

White Stage
Friday	Saturday	Sunday
Millennium Parade Metafive; Kid Fresino; 5lack DYGL; The Dresscodes	Number Girl The Birthday; Momoeyes; Envy; Ajico; Ayano Kaneko; Tricot	Susumu Hirasawa + Ejin Finalby; Tha Blue Herb; Yuta Orisaka; Tendre; Yonawo; Kiro Akiyama

Other major acts include: The Bawdies, Indigo la End, Chai, Yoshinori Sunahara, Aoi Teshima, Char, and Ichiko Aoba.

=== 2020 ===
The festival was scheduled for Friday 21 August through Sunday 23 August 2020, with headline acts to include Tame Impala (Friday), The Strokes (Saturday), Kiyoshiro Imawano Rock 'n' Forever tribute and Denki Groove (both Sunday). On 5 June 2020, this iteration of the festival was postponed to August 2021 due to the COVID-19 pandemic. Instead, the 2020 Fuji Rock Festival was put together from past performances and broadcast live on YouTube on the original scheduled dates.

=== 2019 ===
The festival ran from Friday 26 July until Sunday 28 July in 2019. Headline performers on The Green Stage were The Chemical Brothers, Sia, and The Cure. About 36 percent of the acts were in the rock genre, while the rest of the lineup was composed of pop, R&B, hip hop, and electronic artists.

Green Stage
Friday	Saturday	Sunday
The Chemical Brothers Ellegarden; Janelle Monáe; Route 17 Rock'n'Roll Orchestra; Anne-Marie; Red Hot Chili Pipers	Sia Martin Garrix; Asian Kung-Fu Generation; Cake; Ging Nang Boyz; Dohatsuten	The Cure Jason Mraz; Superfly; Hiatus Kaiyote never young beach Hanggai; Special Guest: G&G Miller Orchestra

White Stage
Friday	Saturday	Sunday
Thom Yorke Tomorrow's Modern Boxes Tycho; Shikao Suga; Gary Clark Jr. King Gizzard & the Lizard Wizard; Tavito Nanao; Lucky Tapes	Death Cab for Cutie American Football; Clammbon; Courtney Barnett; Unknown Mortal Orchestra; ZOO; Gezan	James Blake Vince Staples; KOHH; Hyukoh; Interactivo; Banda Bassotti; Sanabagun.

Other major acts include: Mitski, Toro y Moi, Kaytranada, The Lumineers, The Waterboys, Daniel Caesar, Alvvays, Ego-Wrappin', George Porter Jr., Chon, The Comet Is Coming, and Khruangbin.

=== 2018 ===
The festival ran from Friday 27 July until Sunday 29 July in 2018. Headline acts on The Green Stage were N.E.R.D, Kendrick Lamar, and Bob Dylan. Cumulative attendance reached 125,000 for the third year in a row, with a peak of 40,000 visitors on Saturday,

Green Stage
Friday	Saturday	Sunday
N.E.R.D Sakanaction; Years & Years; Route 17 Rock'n'Roll Orchestra; Glim Spanky; Mongol800	Kendrick Lamar Skrillex; Maximum the Hormone; ~~James Bay~~ Johnny Marr; The Birthday; Eastern Youth	Bob Dylan & His Band Vampire Weekend; Jack Johnson; Anderson .Paak & The Free Nationals; Suchmos; Kodō; Special Guest: G&G Miller Orchestra

White Stage
Friday	Saturday	Sunday
Post Malone Odesza; Elephant Kashimashi; Albert Hammond Jr. Parquet Courts; My Hair Is Bad go!go!vanillas	Brahman Fishbone; Unicorn; Ash; Starcrawler; Esne Beltza; OLEDICKFOGGY	Chvrches Cero; Misia; Kali Uchis; Kacey Musgraves; Kenichi Asai & The Interchange Kills; The Fever 333

Other major acts include: Mac DeMarco, Tune-Yards, Jon Hopkins, Hanaregumi, MGMT, Princess Nokia, The Avalanches (DJ Set), Nathaniel Rateliff & the Night Sweats, Dirty Projectors, Hothouse Flowers, and Greensky Bluegrass.

=== 2017 ===
The festival ran from Friday 28 July until Sunday 30 July in 2017. Headline acts on The Green Stage were Gorillaz, Aphex Twin and Björk. Attendance was estimated to equal the previous year's 125,000 guests, with approximately ¥2.1 billion ($19 million) in ticket sales revenue.

Green Stage
Friday	Saturday	Sunday
Gorillaz The xx Radwimps; Route 17 Rock'n'Roll Orchestra; Rag'n'Bone Man; Group Tamashii	Aphex Twin Cornelius; The Avalanches; Cocco; Jake Shimabukuro; Sambomaster	Björk Lorde; Yuki; Jet; Lukas Graham; Ron Sexsmith; Special Guest: G&G Miller Orchestra

White Stage
Friday	Saturday	Sunday
Queens of the Stone Age Catfish and the Bottlemen; The Hiatus; The Back Horn; Train; Doctor Prats	LCD Soundsystem Kenji Ozawa; Death Grips; Chronixx; 10-FEET; Punpee; H Zettrio	Major Lazer Ásgeir; Bonobo; Rekishi; Shugo Tokumaru; Real Estate; The Novembers

Other major acts include: Sampha, Rhye, Father John Misty, Temples, Quruli, The Strypes, Slowdive, and Thundercat.

=== 2016 ===
The festival ran from Friday 22 July until Sunday 24 July in 2016. Headline acts on The Green Stage were Sigur Rós, Beck and Red Hot Chili Peppers. Attendance for the "20th anniversary" festival was around 125,000 for the weekend.

Green Stage
Friday	Saturday	Sunday
Sigur Rós James Blake; Route 17 Rock'n'Roll Orchestra; Jake Bugg; Biffy Clyro; Boredoms	Beck Wilco; Travis; Man with a Mission; Tom Odell; WANIMA; Special Guest: G&G Miller Orchestra	Red Hot Chili Peppers Ben Harper and The Innocent Criminals; Ken Yokoyama; Stereophonics; 2Cellos; Mark Ernestus' Ndagga Rhythm Force; Special Guest: Denki Groove

White Stage
Friday	Saturday	Sunday
Disclosure Flight Facilities; Illion; The Internet; Suchmos; KOHH; La Gossa Sorda	Squarepusher Tortoise; Ego-Wrappin'; The Heavy; Zainichi Funk; Vant; The Collectors	Battles Explosions in the Sky; Babymetal; Robert Glasper Experiment; Soil & "Pimp" Sessions; Deafheaven; Bo Ningen

Other major acts include: The Birthday, The New Mastersounds, Kula Shaker, Special Others, Years & Years, and Kamasi Washington.

=== 2015 ===
The festival ran from Friday 24 July until Sunday 26 July in 2015. Headline acts on The Green Stage were Foo Fighters, Muse and Noel Gallagher's High Flying Birds. Attendance was 115,000 visitors for the weekend, a dramatic increase over the ten-year-low of the 2014 festival.

Green Stage
Friday	Saturday	Sunday
Foo Fighters Motörhead; One Ok Rock; Owl City; The Vaccines; Route 17 Rock'n'Roll Orchestra	Muse Deadmau5; Gen Hoshino; Nate Ruess; Hiromi Uehara The Trio Project feat. Anthony Jackson & Simon Philips; 10-FEET	Noel Gallagher's High Flying Birds Ride; Sheena Ringo; Johnny Marr; Catfish and the Bottlemen; Alexandros

White Stage
Friday	Saturday	Sunday
Royal Blood Rudimental; Boom Boom Satellites; Joey Bada$$ Sunny Day Service; Petrolz; Theatre Brook	Belle and Sebastian Clammbon; Super Furry Animals; Twenty One Pilots; Kemuri; Rize; Räfven	FKA Twigs Hudson Mohawke toe Ohashi Trio; Todd Rundgren; Cero; Txarango

Other major acts include: Mannish Boys, Flume, Tamio Okuda, Happy Mondays, Galactic feat. Macy Gray, Of Monsters and Men, and Wilko Johnson.

=== 2014 ===
The festival ran from Friday 25 July until Sunday 27 July in 2014. Headline acts on The Green Stage were Franz Ferdinand, Arcade Fire and Jack Johnson. Kanye West was initially announced as Friday's headliner but later cancelled "due to artist circumstances". In total, 102,000 people attended.

Green Stage
Friday	Saturday	Sunday
Franz Ferdinand Denki Groove; Foster the People; Sano Motoharu & The Hobo King Band; Hunter Hayes; The Lumineers; Route 17 Rock'n'Roll Orchestra	Arcade Fire Damon Albarn; The Cro-Magnons; Travis; The Waterboys; Ulfuls; The Heavy	Jack Johnson The Flaming Lips; The Roosters; The Strypes; John Butler Trio; Begin; Ozomatli; Special Guest: The Pogues

White Stage
Friday	Saturday	Sunday
Basement Jaxx Disclosure; Yukihiro Takahashi with In Phase; First Aid Kit; Wild Beasts; Miyavi; G-Freak Factory	Manic Street Preachers Biffy Clyro; Man with a Mission; The Qemists; SiM; White Lung; The Starbems	OutKast Kelis; Your Song Is Good; Ásgeir; Ogre You Asshole; The Heartbreaks; The Man

Other major acts include: The Birthday, Bombay Bicycle Club, Temples, Slowdive, Parquet Courts, moe., Yoko Ono Plastic Ono Band, St. Vincent, Phil Lesh & the Terrapin Family Band, The Lumineers, Lorde, SBTRKT, Buffalo Daughter, and Tokyo Ska Paradise Orchestra.

=== 2013 ===
The festival ran from Friday 26 July until Sunday 28 July in 2013. Headline acts on The Green Stage were Nine Inch Nails, Björk and The Cure. Attendance was 118,000 people for the weekend.

Green Stage
Friday	Saturday	Sunday
Nine Inch Nails Brahman; My Bloody Valentine; Fun. Kemuri; C. J. Ramone; Route 17 Rock'n'Roll Orchestra	Björk Karl Hyde; Foals; Tamio Okuda; Aimee Mann; The Bawdies; Special Guest: Feed Me	The Cure Vampire Weekend; Mumford & Sons; Tokiko Kato & Theatre Brook Hanseiki Rock; Wilko Johnson; Yo La Tengo; THE GOLDEN WET FINGERS

White Stage
Friday	Saturday	Sunday
Skrillex Flying Lotus; Of Monsters and Men; Kenichi Asai & Bad Teacher Kill Club; Yellowcard; Dohatsuten; Arukara	Jurassic 5 Kendrick Lamar; Mannish Boys; Killswitch Engage; Rocket from the Crypt; Namba69; Coheed and Cambria; The Cherry Cokes	The xx Cat Power; Sōtaisei Riron; Toro y Moi; Savages the telephones Portugal. The Man; Tavito Nanao

Other major acts include: Tame Impala, Porter Robinson, Death Grips, DJ Shadow, Tower of Power, Sparks, The Sea and Cake, Boys Noize, Garth Hudson, Ego-Wrappin' and the Gossip of Jaxx, Tahiti 80, Daughter, Jamie xx, Lettuce, and the David Murray Big Band feat. Macy Gray.

=== 2012 ===
The festival ran from Friday 27 July until Sunday 29 July in 2012. Headline acts on The Green Stage were The Stone Roses, Noel Gallagher's High Flying Birds and Radiohead. As of 2017, 2012 holds the record for highest-ever Fuji Rock attendance, with a total of 140,000 visitors over the three days.

Green Stage
Friday	Saturday	Sunday
The Stone Roses Beady Eye; Boom Boom Satellites; The Birthday; Owl City; Ed Sheeran; The Back Horn	Noel Gallagher's High Flying Birds The Specials; Ray Davies & Band; Toots and the Maytals; Seun Kuti and the Egypt 80 Orchestra; Special Others	Radiohead Elvis Costello and The Imposters; Jack White; Inoue Yosui toe Galactic with Corey Glover and Corey Henry

White Stage
Friday	Saturday	Sunday
James Blake DJ Kentaro; Gossip; The Very Best; Tha Blue Herb; Third Coast Kings; Django Django; HEY-SMITH	Justice Sakanaction; Caribou; Rovo; MONO with the Holy Ground Orchestra; Cloud Nothings; Frontier Backyard	At the Drive-In Refused; Explosions in the Sky; Fucked Up locofrank Chthonic a flood of circle

Other major acts include: Ocean Colour Scene, The Kooks, Spiritualized, Purity Ring, Steve Kimock, The Shins, James Iha, alt-J, Japandroids, Ray Davies & Band, Che Sudaka and jizue.

=== 2011 ===
The festival ran from Friday 29 July until Sunday 31 July 2011. Headline acts on The Green Stage were Coldplay, The Faces and The Chemical Brothers; The Music closed the festival out as special guests.

Green Stage
Friday	Saturday	Sunday
Coldplay Arctic Monkeys; Jimmy Eat World; Manu Chao; Kaiser Chiefs; The Vaccines; Dad Mom God	The Faces Tokyo Ska Paradise Orchestra; Battles; Hanaregumi; G. Love & Special Sauce; Fountains of Wayne; Clammbon	The Chemical Brothers Yellow Magic Orchestra; Mogwai; Feeder; The Kills; Glasvegas; Your Song Is Good; Special Guest: The Music

White Stage
Friday	Saturday	Sunday
Big Audio Dynamite CSS; Lee "Scratch" Perry with Mad Professor; Sakerock; The New Mastersounds; Sunny Day Service; Soul Flower Union kegawanomaries	Incubus Asian Dub Foundation; The Hiatus; The Get Up Kids; 10-Feet; Patrick Stump; Funeral Party; Shonen Knife	Wilco Cake; Kazuyoshi Saito; Eastern Youth; No Age; British Sea Power; Shugo Tokumaru; Ringo Deathstarr

Other major acts include: The Sisters of Mercy, Four Tet, Jamie xx, Widespread Panic, Amadou & Mariam, Digitalism, Todd Rundgren, Atari Teenage Riot, Envy, Beach House, Quruli, and Dark Star Orchestra. Queens of the Stone Age and Tangerine Dream were both scheduled to appear, but cancelled two months before the festival.

=== 2010 ===
The festival ran from Friday 30 July until Sunday 1 August 2010. Headline acts on The Green Stage were Muse, Roxy Music and Massive Attack; Scissor Sisters closed the festival out as special guests.

Green Stage
Friday	Saturday	Sunday
Muse Them Crooked Vultures; Ken Yokoyama; Mutemath; The Cribs; Ash; Superfly	Roxy Music John Fogerty; Jamie Cullum; Kula Shaker; John Butler Trio; Hawaiian6; Special Guest: Chris Cunningham	Massive Attack Atoms for Peace; Boom Boom Satellites; Vampire Weekend; Donavon Frankenreiter; Ocean Colour Scene; Asian Kung-Fu Generation; Special Guest: Scissor Sisters

White Stage
Friday	Saturday	Sunday
!!! Corinne Bailey Rae; Special Others; Jaga Jazzist toe Local Natives; Grapevine; The Bawdies	MGMT One Day as a Lion; The Cro-Magnons; Straightener; Third Eye Blind; Vato Negro; Bloodthirsty Butchers; Dohatsuten	Belle and Sebastian Ian Brown; LCD Soundsystem; Foals; Riddim Saunter; Akihiro Namba; Matt and Kim

Other major acts include: Broken Social Scene, The xx, Broken Bells, Char, Magma, Dirty Projectors, Flogging Molly, Fishbone, the Derek Trucks & Susan Tedeschi Band, Ego-Wrappin' and the Gossip of Jaxx, Air, Hot Chip, Buffalo Daughter, moe., Ozomatli, and the Naruyoshi Kikuchi Dub Sextet.

=== 2009 ===
The festival ran from Friday 24 July until Sunday 26 July in 2009. Headline acts on The Green Stage were Oasis, Franz Ferdinand and Weezer.

Green Stage
Friday	Saturday	Sunday
Oasis ~~The Killers~~ Paul Weller; Patti Smith; Lily Allen; Doves; White Lies; Tokyo Ska Paradise Orchestra	Franz Ferdinand Kiyoshiro Imawano Special Message Orchestra all-star tribute Ben Harper and Relentless7; Jet; UA; Seun Kuti & Egypt 80; The Birthday	Weezer Fall Out Boy; Brahman; Jimmy Eat World; Kenichi Asai; Street Sweeper Social Club; Cobra Starship; Special Guest: Basement Jaxx

White Stage
Friday	Saturday	Sunday
The Neville Brothers Robert Randolph and the Family Band; Hanaregumi; Chara; Major Lazer; Ebony Bones; Guitar Wolf	Public Enemy Bad Brains; Zazen Boys; Melvins; Kinniku Shōjo Tai; The Gaslight Anthem; Billy Boy on Poison; 9mm Parabellum Bullet	Röyksopp Animal Collective; Yukihiro Takahashi; Clap Your Hands Say Yeah; DÉ DÉ MOUSE; The Airborne Toxic Event; Holy Fuck; Polysics

Other major acts include: Simian Mobile Disco, M83, Diplo, Clammbon, Tortoise, System 7, Dinosaur Jr., Bright Eyes, The Funky Meters, Booker T. Jones, Maxïmo Park, and the Disco Biscuits.

=== 2008 ===
In 2008, the festival ran from Friday, 25 July through until Sunday, 27 July. Headline acts on The Green Stage were My Bloody Valentine, Underworld, and Primal Scream. Kiyoshiro Imawano was initially announced as Sunday's headliner, but due to a recurrence of his throat cancer, he was forced to cancel his appearance. Primal Scream and The Birthday, subheadliners from Saturday, added Sunday performances to compensate.

Green Stage
Friday	Saturday	Sunday
My Bloody Valentine Kasabian; Bloc Party; Travis; Quruli; The Presidents of the United States of America; Rodrigo y Gabriela	Underworld Primal Scream; The Cro-Magnons; Asian Dub Foundation; Hard-Fi; The Courteeners; Eastern Youth	Primal Scream The Birthday; Ellegarden; Ben Folds; Jakob Dylan of The Wallflowers; Jason Mraz; Mêlée; Special Guest: Asian Dub Foundation

White Stage
Friday	Saturday	Sunday
Bootsy Collins Tribute to the Godfather of Soul Galactic feat. Chali 2na & Boots Riley; Ego-Wrappin'; Kate Nash; Jamie Lidell; Ikuko Harada; Ryukyudisko	Simple Plan The Birthday; Gogol Bordello; The Zutons; The Cribs; All; Asparagus; Ling Tosite Sigure	The Music Yura Yura Teikoku; The Breeders; Stephen Malkmus and the Jicks; The Futureheads; Mystery Jets; Wrench; MONO

Other artists included: Feeder, The Vines, Gossip, Spoon, The Whigs, Dan le Sac Vs Scroobius Pip, Grandmaster Flash, The New Mastersounds, Special Others, Uri Nakayama, Sherbets, Ozomatli, Hocus Pocus, Doberman, Denki Groove, Ian Brown, Tricky, Princess Superstar, Erol Alkan, Richie Hawtin, Lettuce, Flower Travellin' Band, Bettye LaVette, Sparks, CSS, The Go! Team, Foals, White Lies, The Death Set, Neon Neon, Adrian Sherwood, Lee "Scratch" Perry, Michael Franti and Spearhead, Seasick Steve, and Bill Laswell presents Method of Defiance.

=== 2007 ===
The 2007 festival ran from Friday, 27 July through Sunday, 29 July. Headline acts on The Green Stage were The Cure, Beastie Boys, and The Chemical Brothers.

Green Stage
Friday	Saturday	Sunday
The Cure Muse; Kings of Leon; Jarvis Cocker; Kemuri; Yellowcard; Sambomaster	Beastie Boys Iggy Pop & The Stooges; Kaiser Chiefs; Kula Shaker !!! Motion City Soundtrack; Juliette and the Licks	The Chemical Brothers Tokyo Ska Paradise Orchestra; Happy Mondays; Joss Stone; Mika; Fermin Muguruza; Soil & "Pimp" Sessions; Special Guest: Lostprophets

White Stage
Friday	Saturday	Sunday
Groove Armada The John Butler Trio; Money Mark; Your Song Is Good; Stevie Salas Colorcode; The Band Apart; Akainu	Boom Boom Satellites Ash; The Omar Rodriguez-Lopez Group; The Ataris; Less Than Jake; Scafull King; Mae; HiGE	Juno Reactor V∞redoms; Battles; Clammbon; The Shins toe Electrelane; Deerhoof

Other artists included: Fountains of Wayne, Ocean Colour Scene, Blonde Redhead, Ratatat, Yo La Tengo, Pe'z, Kenichi Asai, G. Love & Special Sauce, Lily Allen, Shonen Knife, The Bird and the Bee, Simian Mobile Disco, Justice, Gov't Mule, Grace Potter and the Nocturnals, Feist, Clap Your Hands Say Yeah, Friction, Peter Bjorn and John, The Wombats, Chromeo, Soul Flower Union, Jonathan Richman, and Jake Shimabukuro. Ticket prices for the 2007 festival remained unchanged from the 2006 event.

=== 2006 ===
The 2006 festival ran from Friday, 28 July until Sunday, 30 July (actually Monday morning). Headline acts on The Green Stage were Franz Ferdinand, Red Hot Chili Peppers, and The Strokes.

Green Stage
Friday	Saturday	Sunday
Franz Ferdinand Jet; Dirty Pretty Things; Asian Kung-Fu Generation; The Cooper Temple Clause; Flogging Molly; The String Cheese Incident	Red Hot Chili Peppers Denki Groove; Sonic Youth; Ken Yokoyama; The Hives; The Kingtones feat. Jimmy Irieda & Nancy; Mo'some Tonebender; Wolfmother	The Strokes The Raconteurs; Jason Mraz; Snow Patrol; KT Tunstall; The Refugee All Stars of Sierra Leone; Kodō; Special Guest: Happy Mondays

White Stage
Friday	Saturday	Sunday
Madness Donavon Frankenreiter; Fire Ball with Jungle Roots; Gnarls Barkley; Tommy Guerrero; A Hundred Birds Orchestra; The Cro-Magnons; Sakerock	Scissor Sisters Yeah Yeah Yeahs; Back Drop Bomb; Story of the Year; Straightener; Valencia; Eastern Youth locofrank	Mogwai Super Furry Animals; Buffalo Daughter; Transit Kings; Broken Social Scene; Rinôçérôse; Isis; Envy

Other artists included: The Zutons, Roger Joseph Manning Jr., The Cribs, Atmosphere, Shang Shang Typhoon, North Mississippi Allstars, Blackalicious, Haruomi Hosono, Kula Shaker, Junior Senior, 2manydjs, Tristan Prettyman, Shinya Ohe, Killing Joke, The Automatic, Milburn, Nightmares on Wax, Digitalism, and Umphrey's McGee. Early bird advance tickets for the entire festival cost ¥32,000, while one-day tickets were ¥16,800; however, only 10,000 single-day tickets were made available for each day. Tickets for the on-site campsite cost ¥2,500 per person, and parking was available at a cost of ¥2,000/day but only permitted for cars carrying two or more festival-goers.

=== 2005 ===
The 2005 festival ran from the weekend of 29 – 31 July 2005. Headline acts on The Green Stage were Foo Fighters, Fatboy Slim, and New Order.

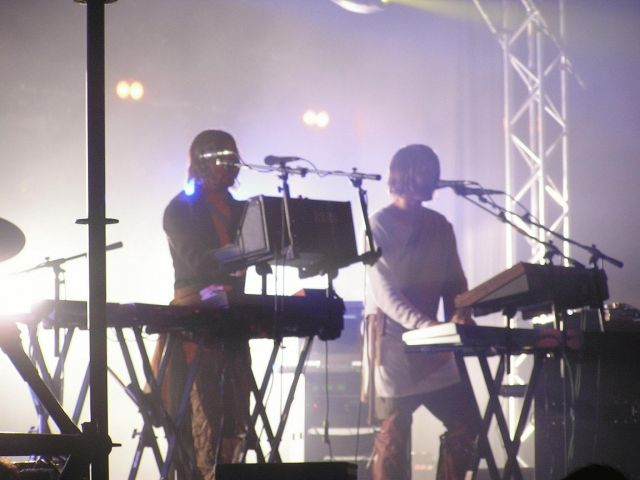
Röyksopp, Red Marquee, 2005

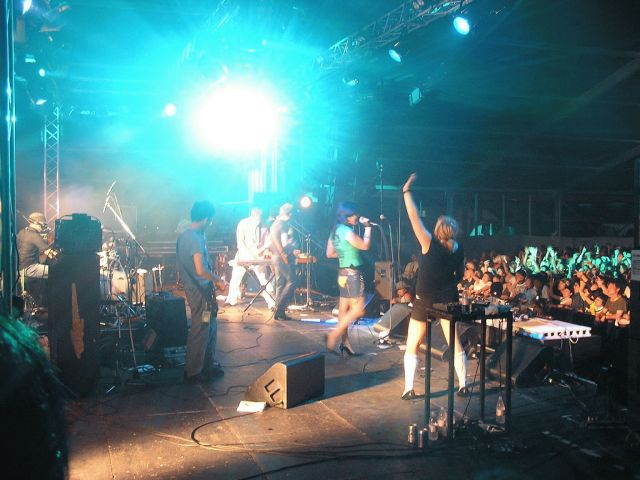
United State of Electronica, Red Marquee, 2005

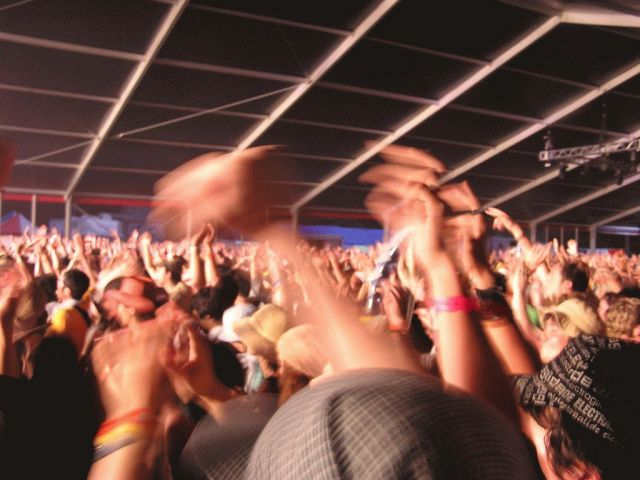
Dancing with Royksopp, Red Marquee, 2005

Green Stage
Friday	Saturday	Sunday
Foo Fighters Coldplay; The Music; The High-Lows; Cake; Simple Plan; Master Low	Fatboy Slim Beck; Asian Dub Foundation; Tokyo Ska Paradise Orchestra; Maxïmo Park; Sherbets; Los Lobos	New Order Special Guest: Primal Scream; The Beach Boys; Quruli; Moby; Ego-Wrappin'; Kemuri; The Knack

White Stage
Friday	Saturday	Sunday
Kiyoshiro Imawano & Nice Middle with New Blue Day Horns The Pogues; Steel Pulse; Prefuse 73; The Ska-Flames; Banda Bassotti; Soil & "Pimp" Sessions; Your Song Is Good	Brahman Dinosaur Jr. ~~Queens of the Stone Age~~ Gang of Four; Feeder; Sambomaster; Hawaiian6; ~~Coheed and Cambria~~; Juliette and the Licks	Sigur Rós The Mars Volta; Boom Boom Satellites; Doves; Athlete; Soul Flower Union; The Go! Team; Afrirampo

Other artists included: Rosso, Charlotte Hatherley, Kaiser Chiefs, The Longcut, Night Snipers, Crown City Rockers, Rovo, Pe'z, The Beautiful Girls, Crazy Ken Band, Lisa Loeb, Eddi Reader, Mercury Rev, Clammbon, The Bravery, Bill Laswell, Laurent Garnier United State of Electronica, Ryan Adams & The Cardinals, My Morning Jacket, The Coral, Röyksopp, The Futureheads, Aqualung, The Magic Numbers, Mylo, Soulive, and The John Butler Trio.

=== 2004 ===
In 2004, the festival ran from Friday 30 July until Sunday 1 August. Headline acts on The Green Stage were Lou Reed, The Chemical Brothers, and The White Stripes. Morrissey was initially announced as Sunday's headliner but cancelled two weeks before the festival due to "a sudden disagreement [...] regarding the terms of the performance".

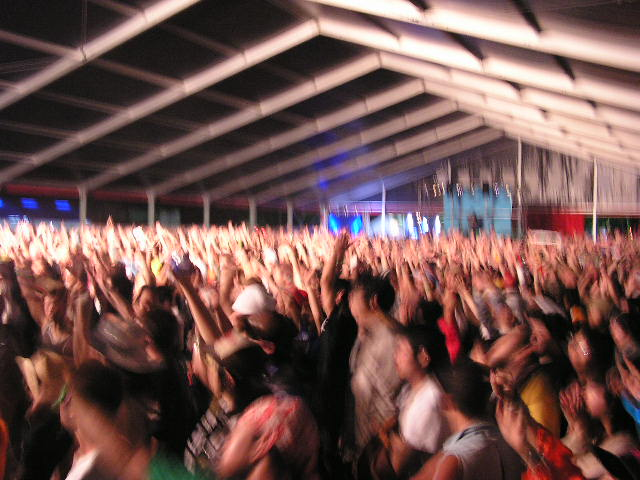
Dancing with Santos in the Red Marquee

Green Stage
Friday	Saturday	Sunday
Lou Reed Pixies; PJ Harvey; The Roosters; Haven; The Blind Boys of Alabama; Pe'z; British Sea Power	The Chemical Brothers Kiyoshiro Imawano & Nice Middle with New Blue Day Horns; Courtney Love; Ben Harper and The Innocent Criminals; Franz Ferdinand; Mitch Mitchell and Billy Cox of the Jimi Hendrix Experience; Jamaica All Stars	~~Morrissey~~ The White Stripes; Jet; The Libertines; Cosmic Rough Riders; Jamie Cullum; The Soundtrack of Our Lives; Shibusashirazu Orchestra

White Stage
Friday	Saturday	Sunday
Tokyo Jihen Basement Jaxx; The X-Ecutioners; Ozomatli; Char; Kemuri; The Bees; Little Tempo	Primus Yura Yura Teikoku; Jimmy Eat World; Dropkick Murphys; Husking Bee; Steriogram; The Back Horn; The Mooney Suzuki	Belle and Sebastian Graham Coxon; Zazen Boys !!! Praxis feat. Bill Laswell múm South; Aburadako

Other artists included: Supercar, The Zutons, Asian Kung-Fu Generation, Snow Patrol, The Killers, Sikth, Zero 7, Dizzee Rascal, DJ Krush, Chris Robinson & New Earth Mud, Buckethead's Giant Robot, Hifana, The Charlatans, Yeah Yeah Yeahs, Ben Kweller, The Streets, Santos, Buffalo Daughter, Jack Johnson, Donavon Frankenreiter, The Blind Boys of Alabama, Ash, Keane, The Stills, Sambomaster, Simple Kid, The Black Keys, Stevie Salas, Keller Williams, and moe.

=== 2003 ===
In 2003, the festival ran from Friday 25 July until Sunday 27 July. Headline acts on The Green Stage were Underworld, Björk, and Elvis Costello.

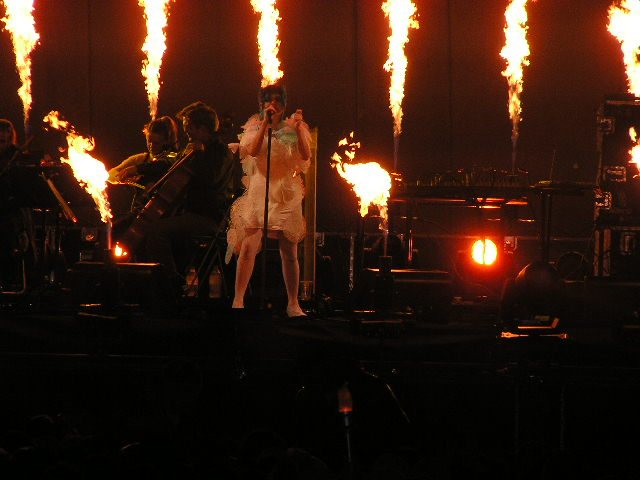
Björk on the main stage at Fuji – Year 2003

Green Stage
Friday	Saturday	Sunday
Underworld Macy Gray; The Music; The Libertines; Sugar Ray; Danko Jones; Thee Michelle Gun Elephant	Björk Primal Scream; Coldplay; Asian Dub Foundation; Masayoshi Yamazaki; Back Drop Bomb; Dirty Dozen Brass Band	Elvis Costello Massive Attack; Steve Winwood; Evanescence; Vincent Gallo; ~~Murderdolls~~; Jude

White Stage
Friday	Saturday	Sunday
Ben Harper and The Innocent Criminals Sly and Robbie with Michael Rose; Fire Ball; Michael Franti and Spearhead; El Gran Silencio; Talib Kweli; Scha Dara Parr; The Mods	Iggy Pop The Mad Capsule Markets; Godsmack; Anthrax; Hotwire; Sheena & The Rokkets; ~~The Parkinsons~~; Guitar Wolf	Mogwai The Orb; Lemon Jelly; Quruli; Yo La Tengo; Rovo; Clammbon; OOIOO

Other major acts include: Audio Active, Death in Vegas, El-P/Aesop Rock/DJ Big Wiz, Prefuse 73, Bob Weir and RatDog, G. Love & Special Sauce, John Mayall & the Bluesbreakers, The Coral, Goldfrapp, Röyksopp, Boom Boom Satellites, The Jeevas, Ego-Wrappin', The Thrills, Jet, Dirty Vegas, Steve Kimock Band, and The Sun Ra Arkestra.

=== 2002 ===
In 2002, the festival ran from Friday 26 July until Sunday 28 July. Headline acts on The Green Stage were The Prodigy, The Chemical Brothers, and Red Hot Chili Peppers.

Green Stage
Friday	Saturday	Sunday
The Prodigy Muse; V∞redoms; Alec Empire; The Jeevas; Tokyo Ska Paradise Orchestra; American Hi-Fi	The Chemical Brothers Pet Shop Boys; Yōsui Inoue; Kiyoshiro Imawano & Akiko Yano; Trik Turner; Love Psychedelico; Shibusashirazu Orchestra	Red Hot Chili Peppers Jane's Addiction; Brahman; Char; The High-Lows; Queens of the Stone Age; Yura Yura Teikoku; Banda Bassotti

White Stage
Friday	Saturday	Sunday
George Clinton & Parliament-Funkadelic Manu Chao Radio Bemba Sound System; Rhymester; The Skatalites; Blackalicious; Fidel Nadal; Shing02; YKZ	Sonic Youth Butthole Surfers; The Get Up Kids; JUDE (Kenichi Asai); The Dillinger Escape Plan; Master Low; Midtown; Mo'some Tonebender	Spiritualized Cornelius; Gomez; The Cooper Temple Clause; Supercar; Yonin Bayashi; Date Course Pentagon Royal Garden

Other major acts include: Black Rebel Motorcycle Club, Television, X-Press 2, Patti Smith, The White Stripes, Billy Bragg and The Blokes, Buffalo Daughter, The Music, Hundred Reasons, Shonen Knife, The Cinematic Orchestra, DJ Shadow, Tha Blue Herb, The String Cheese Incident, Ian Brown, Doves, and Galactic.

=== 2001 ===
The festival ran from Friday 27 July until Sunday 29 July in 2001. Headline acts on The Green Stage were Oasis, Neil Young & Crazy Horse, and Eminem.

Green Stage
Friday	Saturday	Sunday
Oasis Manic Street Preachers; Travis; Asian Dub Foundation; Sherbets; Dropkick Murphys; Kemuri	Neil Young & Crazy Horse Alanis Morissette; Stereophonics; Patti Smith; Hothouse Flowers; Juno Reactor; Number Girl	Eminem Tool; System of a Down; Alec Empire; Xzibit; Dry & Heavy; Brahman; Fermin Muguruza

White Stage
Friday	Saturday	Sunday
Tricky Mos Def; Nitro Microphone Underground; Muro; Breakestra with Peanut Butter Wolf; Ego-Wrappin'; Kick the Can Crew; Rappagariya	New Order Alec Empire; Mogwai; YamaArashi; Dengeki Network; Regurgitator; Suck Down; Eastern Youth	Brian Eno & J. Peter Schwalm: Drawn from Life Coldcut; ~~Autechre~~ Orbital; Squarepusher; Two Lone Swordsmen; Little Tempo; Joujouka

Other major acts include: Husking Bee, Semisonic, Feeder, Stereo MCs, Unkle, Juno Reactor, V∞redoms, Echo & the Bunnymen, Powderfinger, The Cooper Temple Clause, Kemuri, Ani DiFranco, UA, and Tegan and Sara.

=== 2000 ===
In 2000, the festival ran from Friday 28 July until Sunday 30 July. Headline acts on The Green Stage were Blankey Jet City (their final live performance), Thee Michelle Gun Elephant, and Primal Scream.

Green Stage
Friday	Saturday	Sunday
Blankey Jet City The Chemical Brothers; Foo Fighters; Elliott Smith; Placebo; The Killer Barbies; Fishbone	Thee Michelle Gun Elephant Johnny Marr's Healers; Sonic Youth; Ruffy Tuffy; The Animalhouse; Rollins Band; Ozomatli	Primal Scream Ian Brown; Elastica; A Perfect Circle; Toploader; Zebrahead; ~~Eve 6~~ Deadweight; Soul Flower Union

White Stage
Friday	Saturday	Sunday
Asian Dub Foundation Fishbone; MDFMK; Potshot; Garlic Boys; BEAST; Yellow Machinegun; Lä-Ppisch	Run-DMC Roni Size / Reprazent; Kelis; Buddha Brand & El Dorado All Stars; Dry & Heavy; Tha Blue Herb; Kojima; The Trojans	Denki Groove Leftfield; Stereolab; Moby; Boom Boom Satellites; Buffalo Daughter; Fila Brazillia; Jah Shaka

Other major acts include: Grapevine, Eagle-Eye Cherry, G. Love & Special Sauce, OOIOO, Mogwai, Yura Yura Teikoku, Yo La Tengo, Richard D. James & DJ Grant, Super Furry Animals, Gomez, Rammstein, Jess Klein, and Kinocosmo.

=== 1999 ===
In 1999, the festival ran from Friday 30 July until Sunday 1 August. Headline acts on The Green Stage were Rage Against the Machine, Blur, and ZZ Top. This was the first year that the festival was held in its present location at Naeba Ski Resort in Niigata Prefecture, as well as the first year that it expanded from a two-day to three-day festival.

Green Stage
Friday	Saturday	Sunday
Rage Against the Machine The Black Crowes; Hi-Standard; Nawang Khechog; Stevie Salas; Tamio Okuda; Phish; Rocket from the Crypt; Special Guest: Todos Tus Muertos	Blur The Chemical Brothers; Limp Bizkit; Skunk Anansie; Ray Davies; UA; Boredoms; Tokyo Ska Paradise Orchestra; Rory McLeod	ZZ Top Joe Strummer and the Mescaleros; Nawang Khechog; Bernard Butler; Ocean Colour Scene; Ruffy Tuffy; Ash; Catatonia; Femi Kuti; Todos Tus Muertos

White Stage
Friday	Saturday	Sunday
Underworld Propellerheads; Audio Active; Death in Vegas; Regular Fries; Neve; Dengeki Network	The Jon Spencer Blues Explosion Atari Teenage Riot; Eastern Youth; Back Drop Bomb; Feeder; Brahman; DMBQ	Happy Mondays Tricky; Lee "Scratch" Perry; Fun Lovin' Criminals; Fountains of Wayne; Mishka; Polysics

Field of Heaven
Friday	Saturday	Sunday
Phish Ruby; Big Frog; Rory McLeod; Osamu Koganei	Phish Todos Tus Muertos; Nawang Khechog with the 3Peace; Rory McLeod; Hiroki Okano with Tenkoo Orchestra	Phish Femi Kuti; Todos Tus Muertos; Breakbeat Era; Rory McLeod

Other major acts include Mix Master Mike, Prince Paul & Automator, Boom Boom Satellites, The Orb, DJ Spooky, That Subliminal Kid, Quruli, Jungle Brothers, and Mad Professor. Phish headlined the Field of Heaven stage all three days, and their complete performance from Jul 31, 1999 was officially released as Japan Relief in March 2011.

=== 1998 ===
In 1998, the festival was held at Tokyo Bayside Square in Toyosu and ran from Saturday 1 August until Sunday 2 August. Headline acts on The Green Stage were Björk and The Prodigy.

Green Stage
Saturday	Sunday
Björk Beck; Elvis Costello with Steve Nieve; Kiyoshiro Imawano Little Screaming Revue; Sonic Youth; Garbage; Blankey Jet City; Stereophonics; Midget	The Prodigy Primal Scream; Ian Brown; Hotei; Korn; Ben Folds Five; Thee Michelle Gun Elephant; The Montrose Avenue

White Stage
Saturday	Sunday
Iggy Pop Nick Cave & The Bad Seeds; MCM and the Monster; Guitar Wolf; Tokyo Ska Paradise Orchestra; Sheena & The Rokkets; Shonen Knife; Hoff Dylan	Goldie Asian Dub Foundation; Audio Active; Junkie XL; Lo Fidelity Allstars; Tokyo No.1 Soul Set; Geodezik; Kemuri

=== 1997 ===
1997 was the only year that the festival was actually held on Mount Fuji, at the Fuji Tenjinyama Ski Resort. It was intended to run from Saturday 26 July until Sunday 27 July, although the second day was cancelled due to a typhoon. Headline acts on the Main Stage were Red Hot Chili Peppers and Green Day.

Main Stage
Saturday	Sunday
Red Hot Chili Peppers Rage Against the Machine; The Yellow Monkey; Foo Fighters; The High-Lows; Southern Culture on the Skids; Third Eye Blind; Summercamp	~~Green Day~~ ~~Beck~~; ~~The Prodigy~~; ~~The Seahorses~~; ~~Hotei~~; ~~Weezer~~; ~~Southern Culture on the Skids~~; ~~Sugizo~~

Second Stage
Saturday	Sunday
Aphex Twin Atari Teenage Riot; Denki Groove; Boredoms; The Mad Capsule Markets; Girls Against Boys; Zubons; Black Bottom Brass Band	~~Massive Attack~~ ~~Lee "Scratch" Perry~~; ~~Squarepusher~~; ~~Mad Professor~~; ~~Audio Active~~; ~~Sneaker Pimps~~; ~~Shonen Knife~~; ~~Tokyo No.1 Soul Set~~

== See also ==
- List of historic rock festivals
