= Rock in Japan Festival =

Music festival in Chiba, Japan

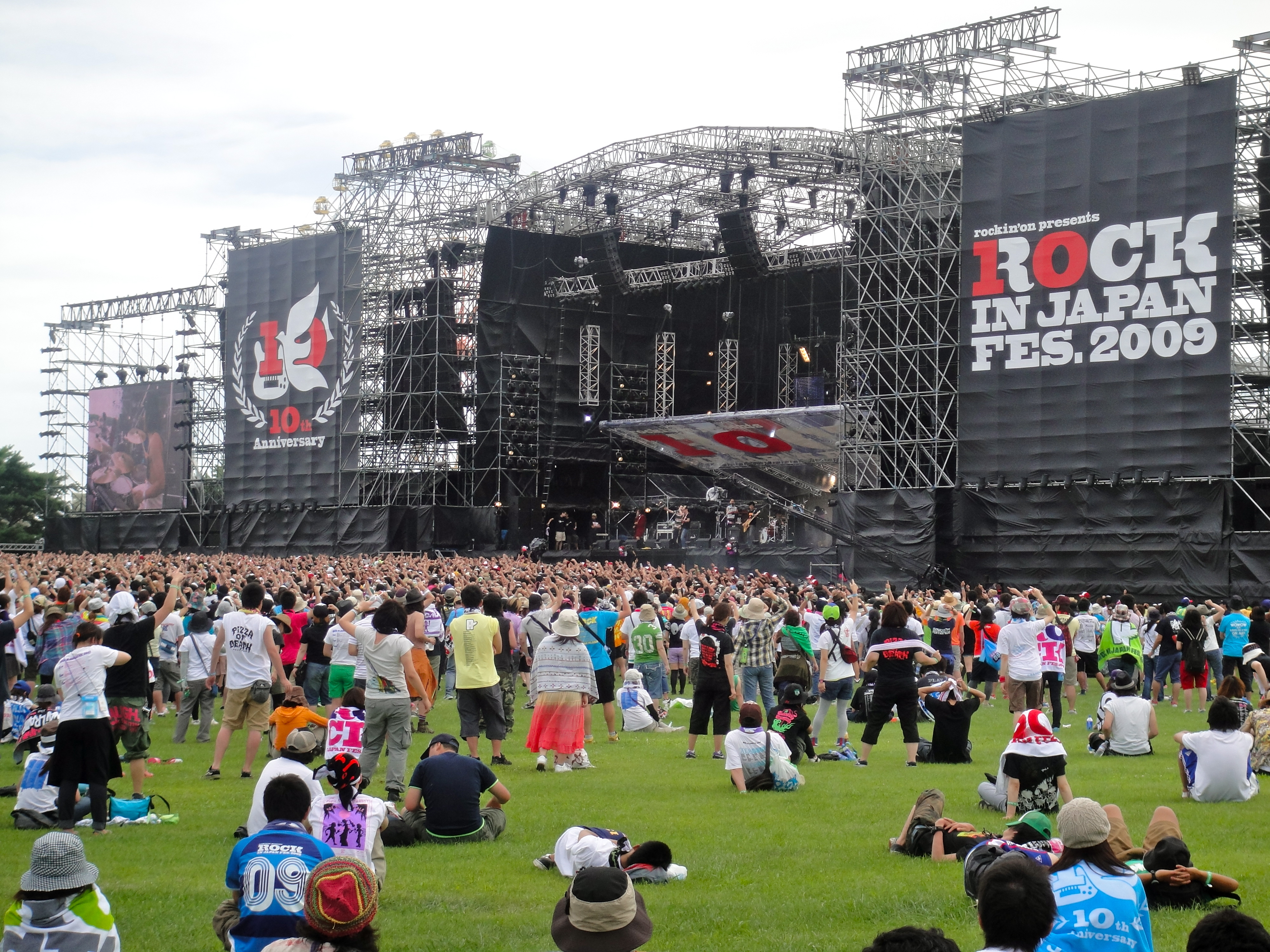
- Genre: Rock and alternative music festival
- Locations: Soga Sports Park, Chiba, Chiba (2022-present); Hitachi Seaside Park, Hitachinaka, Ibaraki, Japan (2000-2021)
- Years active: 2000–present
- Inaugurated: 12 August 2000; 26 years ago
- Most recent: 21 September 2026; 54 days ago
- Website: Official website

The Rock in Japan Festival is an annual three-day rock festival held during early August at Soga Sports Park, Chiba, Chiba, Japan, organized by Rockin'on. Rock in Japan Festival is considered to be one of the largest rock festivals in Japan alongside Summer Sonic Festival, Fuji Rock Festival, and Rising Sun Rock Festival.

== Performances ==
=== 2012 ===
| Day | GRASS STAGE | LAKE STAGE | sound of forest | WING TENT | Seaside Stage |
|---|---|---|---|---|---|
| 1 （08-03） | NICO Touches the Walls; Straightener; Dragon Ash; 10-FEET; Maximum the Hormone; Princess Princess; Yuki; Kreva | TOTALFAT; dustbox; the band apart; Shikao Suga; Rhymester; Chara; Fujimaki Ryota; capsule | Motohiro Hata; Kyary Pamyu Pamyu; HiGE; plenty; Unison Square Garden; AA=; Overground Acoustic Underground"5"; GOOD4NOTHING | Teens Rock in Hitachinaka 2012; THE Loveningen; Merry; Weaver; Thuru; avengers in sci-fi; Kuronekochelsea; coldrain; back number | Oreskaband; Hemenway; UL; Taro Kobayashi; Applicat Spectra; ROTTENGRAFFTY; SCOOBIE DO; Eoin O'Kane and the Stockholm Symphony Orchestra |
| 2 （08-04） | The Bawdies; Chatmonchy; Quruli; Elephant Kashimashi; Kaela Kimura; 9mm Parabellum Bullet; Perfume; The Hiatus | ORANGE RANGE; Triceratops; BIGMAMA; Mao Abe; Flower Companyz; Kinniku Shōjo Tai; androp; Fujifabric | HALCALI; Mucc; miwa; MONOBRIGHT; ZAZEN BOYS; Yūko Andō; Mow Mow LuLu Gyaban | Noise and milk; killing Boy; cinema staff; Plastic Tree; Mao Uchu; J; Yuji Nakada; OKAMOTO'S; MO'SOME TONEBENDER | GLORY HILL; Hilcrhyme; mudy on the Sakuban; The SALOVERS; AkaiKo-en; Dendai; Suneohair |
| 3 （08-05） | ONE OK ROCK; Sambomaster; Funky Monkey Babys; Base Ball Bear; Tamio Okuda; Ketsumeishi; Spitz; ACIDMAN | the telephones; DOES; Yu Takahashi; Tortoise Matsumoto; LOW IQ 01 & MASTER LOW; AKIHIRO NAMBA; SHAKALABBITS; POLYSICS | ASPARAGUS; Northern19; Hidaka Toruto FED Music; Negoto; [Champagne]; YOUR SONG IS GOOD; Man With A Mission; Magokoro Brothers | Sayonara, Matakondo ne; Ketsumeishi; Aya Mizubochi; knotlamp; COMEBACK MY DAUGHTERS; Pay money To my Pain; WHITE ASH; Last Alliance; Miyavi | Leo Ieiri; FLiP; Hello Sleepwalkers; Shinku Horou; FoZZtone; Isobe Masafumi; Zainichi Funk |

=== 2013 ===
| Day | GRASS STAGE | LAKE STAGE | sound of forest | PARK STAGE | WING TENT | DJ BOOTH |
|---|---|---|---|---|---|---|
| 1 (08–02) | [Champagne]; Puffy; Mongol800; Kyary Pamyu Pamyu; One Ok Rock; Maximum the Hormone; RIP SLYME; Sakanaction | HEY-SMITH; coldrain; THE BACK HORN; Totalfat; Unison Square Garden; BIGMAMA; Fujifabric; Straightener | OKAMOTO'S; good morning America; Shugo Tokumaru; SOIL&"PIMP"SESSIONS; ZAZEN BOYS; Flower Flower; Motohiro Hata; back number | Wasureranneyo; Yuji NAKADA; NEGOTO; Merengue; Last Alliance; ROTTENGRAFFTY; MowMow LuLu Gyaban; HUSKING BEE | the Village Papas; Noise and milk; Niiyama Shiori; fukurouzu; Kavka Shishido; Tancobuchin; The Flickers; INORAN; Dr.DOWNER | PASSPO☆; SKY-HI; BiS; kz (livetune); Charisma.com; Yoohei Kawakami ([Champagne]); LinQ; Bunta&Kuboty (TOTALFAT); CTS; RAM RIDER feat.TEMPURA KIDZ; Hiroaki Maeda (puke!); Michio Nishimura (Parade) |
| 2 (08–03) | POLYSICS; Base Ball Bear; SPECIAL OTHERS; NICO Touches the Walls; Ken Hirai; 9mm Parabellum Bullet; ASIAN KUNG-FU GENERATION; BUMP OF CHICKEN | Leo Ieiri; LOW IQ 01 & THE RHYTHM MAKERS α; Nothing's Carved in Stone; Miliyah Kato; creephyp; Yu Takahashi; androp; capsule | Hello Sleepwalkers; Masayoshi Yamazaki; The Novembers; Overground Acoustic Underground "5"; cinema staff; Hilcrhyme; King-Show; A Flood of Circle | White Ash; the chef cooks me; Shinku-horou; Akaiko-en; lecca; PES; BACK DROP BOMB; GOOD4NOTHING | SameZame; Buzz The Bears; Sayonara、 Matakondone; J; Mao Uchu; Passepied; Applicat Spectra; Magokoro Brothers | ELIXIA; SHUN; Up Up Girls (Kakko Kari); Kurikamaki; Hasta la vista; Ichiro Yatsui (elecomic); Hiroyuki Hayashi (POLYSICS); Dempagumi.inc; SALU; sasakure.UK; Takayuki Endoh (FREAK AFFAIR); Hiroaki Maeda (puke!) |
| 3 (08–04) | Kreva; Dragon Ash; The Birthday; Quruli; Group Tamashii; The Hiatus; 10-FEET; Perfume | DOES; CNBLUE; Miwa; Tortoise Matsumoto; Anzen Chitai; Tamio Okuda; ORANGE RANGE; TK from Ling Tosite Sigure | Tokyo KaranKoron; Ohashi Trio; Maaya Sakamoto; THE STARBEMS; plenty; Scandal; Tricot; The Band Apart | The Mirraz; avengers in sci-fi; Flower Companyz; Scott & Rivers; Miyavi; Kinoco Hotel; Yūko Andō; The Dresscodes | NUBO; KANA-BOON; MY FIRST STORY; Luki; Rihwa; Predawn; Taro Kobayashi; Sakanamon | DJ'Tekina//Something a.k.a Yuyoyuppe; PAGE; Shoko Nakagawa; UL; Pierre Nakano (Ling Tosite Sigure); Babymetal; 9nine; Dienoji; HachiojiP; Takayuki Endoh (FREAK AFFAIR); Michio Nishimura (Parade) |
