= The Roosters =

Japanese rock band

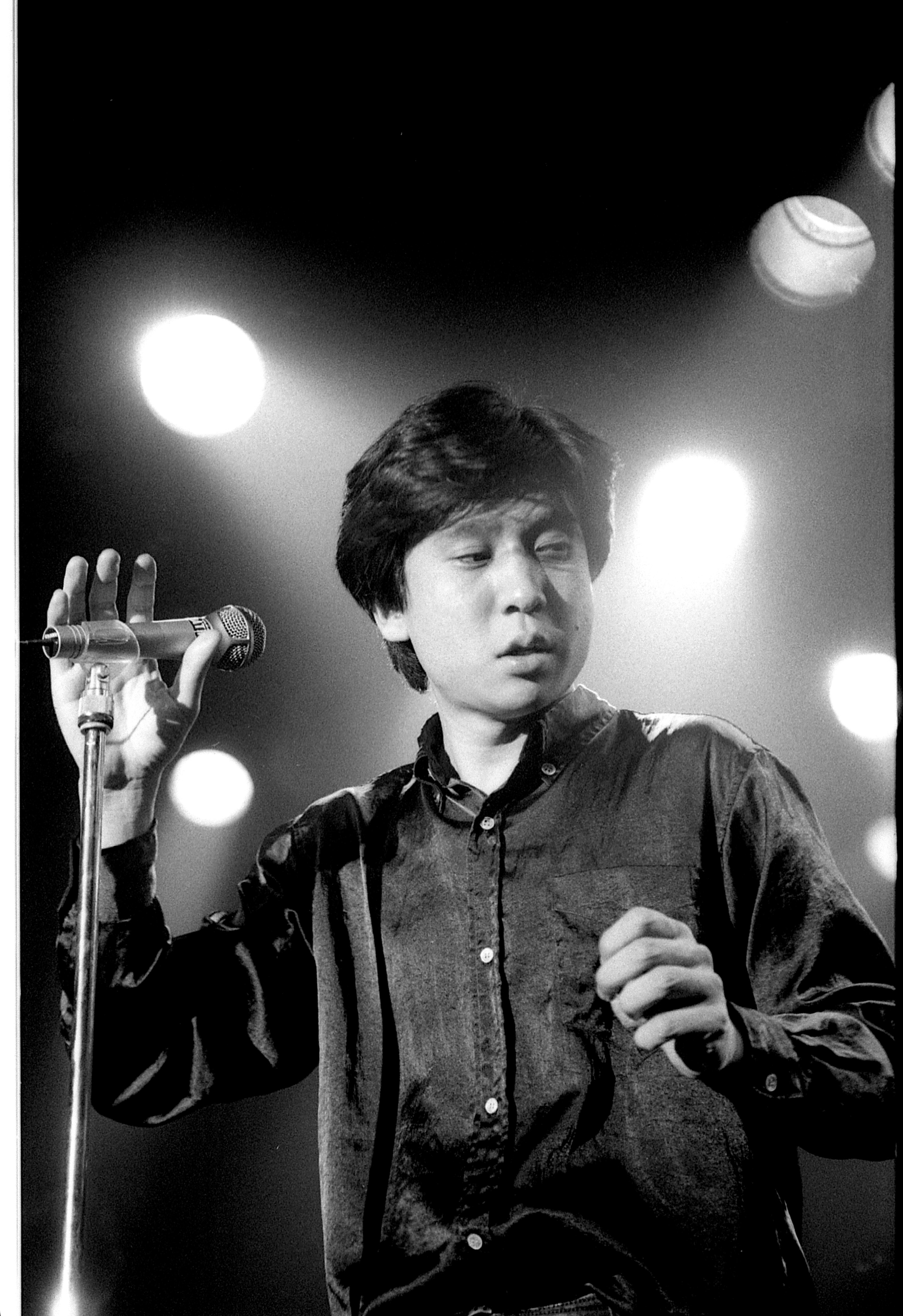
- Shinya Oe in 1989

Background information
- Also known as: The Roosterz
- Origin: Fukuoka, Japan
- Genres: Rhythm and blues, pub rock, new wave
- Years active: 1979–1988, 2004, 2009–present
- Labels: Nippon Columbia
- Members: Shinya Oe; Hiroyuki Hanada; Tomio Inoue; Junzi Ikehata
- Past members: Jun Shimoyama; Kazuhiko Sakuyama; Masayuki Nadatomo; Koichi Ando; Nikichi Anai; Shigeo Mihara
- Website: http://roosters.gate40.com/

The Roosters (Japanese: ザ・ルースターズ, Hepburn: Za Rūsutāzu; also written as The Roosterz) are a Japanese rock band formed in Fukuoka Prefecture in 1979. Their music has mixed rock and roll, punk rock, British blues, ska, and new wave. Originally active from 1979 to 1988, they performed at the 2004 Fuji Rock Festival before restarting activities in 2009. Through the years, guitarist Hiroyuki Hanada remained the only constant member, with the band currently consisting of the original lineup. In 2003, HMV ranked the Roosters at number 75 on their list of the 100 most important Japanese pop acts. In September 2007, Rolling Stone Japan rated their album Good Dreams number 28 on its list of the "100 Greatest Japanese Rock Albums of All Time".

== History ==
They formed in 1979 in the Hakata ward of Fukuoka, named after the blues standard "Little Red Rooster". Although there were four different lineups throughout the life of the band—all centered around guitarist Hiroyuki Hanada--Shinya Oe was the band's first frontman. Oe not only sang lead vocals, but also dominated the writing of lyrics and music for the group for the first three albums. In addition to Oe's contributions, the first two albums were made up of several cover songs. Their third album Insane was a step in a new direction, it was not only the first original Roosters album, but it also featured the first Roosters song not written and composed by Oe: "Baby Sitter", written and composed by bassist Tomio Inoue. This was the first sign of a more democratic Roosters, and it paved the way for Hanada to compose songs for their fourth album Dis.

The Roosters' sixth album φPHY was Oe's last with the group, with only about half of the record credited to him. The rest of the album is credited to Toshiyuki Shibayama for his lyrics and Hanada for his musical compositions. Shibayama continued to write a large portion of the lyrics for the group until they broke up, but never played with them or was an official member. The Roosters appeared, along with other Japanese rock bands, in the 1982 Sogo Ishii film Burst City. In 1985 Shinya Oe decided to take an indefinite break from making music and left the band. Despite losing an integral member of the band the Roosters pressed on and released their seventh album Neon Boy less than nine months after Oe's departure. A single, "Out Land", was Jun Shimoyama's first contribution as a songwriter and composer for the group. Shimoyama continued to write lyrics and music for the band along with Hanada until the band's dissolution in 1988.

In March 1999 a tribute album entitled Respectable Roosters was released and featured bands influenced by The Roosters such as the pillows, Thee Michelle Gun Elephant, Tokyo Ska Paradise Orchestra, Supercar, Kemuri and others performing covers of their songs.

In the year 2002, four of the original Roosters from various incarnations came together to form the Rock'n'Roll Gypsies.

In 2004 Shinya Oe ended his lengthy musical hiatus to reunite with the original lineup of the Roosters to perform at the 2004 Fuji Rock Festival.

== Lineups ==
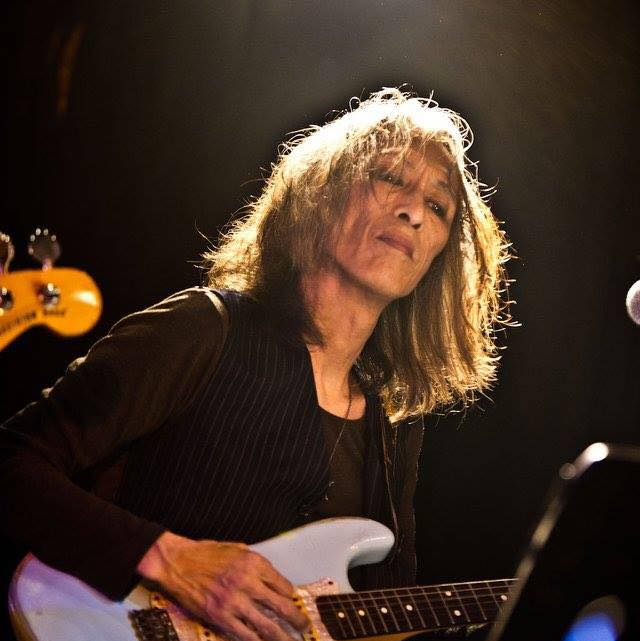
Jun Shimoyama

1. The Roosters (February 1979 - July 1983, 2004, 2009 - present)
  - Shinya Oe (大江 慎也 Ōe Shin'ya) - Vocals, Guitar
  - Hiroyuki Hanada (花田 裕之 Hanada Hiroyuki) - Lead Guitar
  - Tomio Inoue (井上 富雄 Inoue Tomio) - Bass Guitar
  - Junzi Ikehata (池畑 潤二 Ikehata Junji) - Drums (Withdrew September 1983)
2. The Roosterz (July 1983 - March 1985)
  - Shinya Oe - Vocals, Guitar
  - Hiroyuki Hanada - Lead Guitar
  - Jun Shimoyama (下山 淳 Shimoyama Jun) - Lead Guitar
  - Tomio Inoue - Bass (Withdrew January 1984)
  - Kazuhiko Sakuyama (柞山 一彦 Kazuyama Kazuhiko) - Bass
  - Masayuki Nadatomo (灘友 正幸 Nadatomo Masayuki) - Drums
  - Koichi Ando (安藤 広一 Andō Kōichi) - Keyboards (Withdrew March 1985)
3. The Roosterz (March 1985 - December 1987)
  - Hiroyuki Hanada - Vocals, Guitar
  - Jun Shimoyama - Guitar
  - Kazuhiko Sakuyama - Bass Guitar
  - Masayuki Nadatomo - Drums
4. The Roosterz (December 1987 - July 1988)
  - Hiroyuki Hanada - Vocals, Guitar
  - Jun Shimoyama - Lead Guitar
  - Nikichi Anai (穴井 仁吉 Anai Nikichi) - Bass
  - Shigeo Mihara (三原 重夫 Mihara Shigeo) - Drums

Romanization Note: There are three members of the Roosters who prefer irregular romanizations of their names, Shinya Oe, Junzi Ikehata and Koichi Ando. 'Modified Hepburn' romanizations are given next to their names in Japanese in their case.

== Discography ==
Albums

- The Roosters (1980)
- The Roosters a-Gogo (1981)
- Insane (1981)
- Dis. (1983)
- Good Dreams (1984)
- φPHY (1984)
- SOS (1985)
- Neon Boy (1985)
- Kaminari (1986)
- Passenger (1987)
- Four Pieces (1988)
- Four Pieces Live (1988)
