= Syrup16g =

- Origin: Shimokitazawa, Tokyo, Japan
- Genres: Alternative rock, indie rock, emo
- Years active: 1996–2008, 2014–present
- Labels: Tinstar Records, Daizawa Records, Nippon Columbia, Universal Music
- Members: Takashi Igarashi; Daiki Nakahata; Maki Kitada
- Past members: Motoaki Satou (left the band in 2002)
- Website: www.syrup16g.jp

Syrup16g (シロップじゅうろくグラム, Shiroppu Jūroku Guramu) is a Japanese alternative rock band formed in the suburbs of Tokyo.

== History ==
Syrup16g formed in 1993 when Igarashi and drummer Nakahata Daiki met at vocational school in Tokyo and decided to form a band. Shortly after, bassist Satou Motoaki and a short-lived vocalist joined the band. In 1996, the vocalist left and guitarist Igarashi (who had written the songs all along) took over vocal duties. From the release of their first 6 song demo EP in 1998 until 2001, the band built quite a name for themselves in the Tokyo indie scene, attracting the attention of indie label Daizawa Records, the label also responsible for Condor44 and Tsubakiya Shijuusou.

In 2001, Syrup's first album, Copy was released on Daizawa Records to critical acclaim, with the record-release show at Shimokitazawa's Club Que selling out. Tours of western Japan with Art-School and label-mates Condor44 followed shortly after, vaulting Syrup into the public eye. Their major label debut on Columbia, Coup D'état, followed in 2002 along with shows with Bloodthirsty Butchers and Losalios. Shortly after the release of Coup D'état, bassist Satoh parted ways with the band, and Studio Apes bassist Kitada Maki joined to replace him.

For about 3 years, Syrup16g kept up a backbreaking pace of touring and studio work, consistently releasing more than one album a year and never failing to both tour in support of the albums and appear at major events such as the Rock in Japan Festival and the Fuji Rock Festival. In addition, they have released two live DVDs and a number of singles.

In early 2006, Syrup16g scaled down their touring schedule to accommodate the schedules of the members' side projects, and no album release was planned.

At a December 7, 2007 concert at NHK Hall, the band announced that it would dissolve following a final performance at Nippon Budokan on March 1, 2008. The announcement was confirmed on the band's official website.

In June 2014 it was announced that Syrup16g would resume activities with a new album. The album, Hurt, was released on August 27, 2014. That September, the band embarked on a tour of Nagoya, Tokyo and Osaka to promote the album.

== Discography ==
=== Studio albums ===
- Copy (2001)
- Coup d'État (2002)
- Delayed (2002)
- Hell-See (2003)
- Mouth to Mouse (2004)
- Delayedead (2004)
- Syrup16g (2008)
- Hurt (2014)
- darc (2016)
- delaidback (2017)
- Les Misé blue (2022)

=== Compilation albums ===
- Doumyaku (2006)
- Joumyaku (2006)

=== EP and singles ===
- Free Throw (1999)
- "Purple Mukade" (2003)
- "My Song" (2003)
- "Real" (2004)
- "Uoza" (2004)
- "I.N.M." (2004)
- Kranke (2015)

=== DVDs ===
- Blacksound/Blackhumor (2004)
- Chishi 10.10 (2005)
- Daimas no Nikki Special no Nikki (2006)
- GHOST PICTURES (2007)
- the last day of syrup16g (2008)
- Daizawa Jidai ~Decade of Daizawa Days~ (2012)
- Saihatsu Kanja (2016)
- syrup16g LIVE Les Mise blue naked「20210(extendead)」 Tokyo Garden Theatre 2021.11.04 (2023)
- Chishi 11.02 - Hibiya Open-Air Concert Hall (2024)

=== Demo tapes ===
- Syrup16g01 (1999)
- Syrup16g02 (1999)

=== Compilation appearances ===
- "Tonsei (Hakuchuumu ver)" on Hanaotoko (2003, Faith Music Entertainment)
