= Brahman (band) =

Japanese rock band

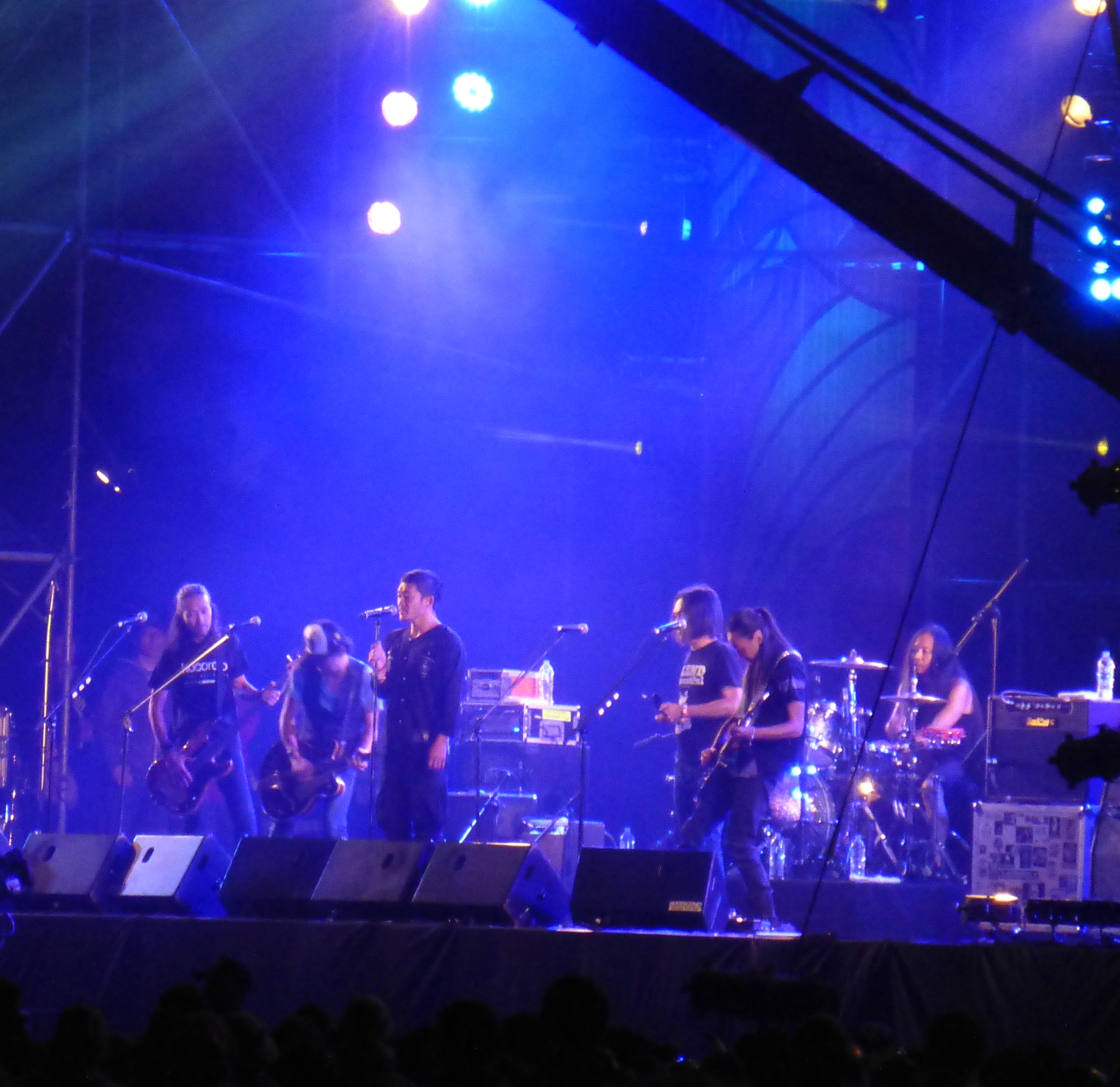
- Live on stage in 2016

Background information
- Origin: Tokyo, Japan
- Genres: Alternative rock, hardcore
- Years active: 1995–present
- Labels: NOFRAMES/Toy's Factory, Revelation
- Members: Toshi-Low; Makoto; Ronzi; Kohki
- Past members: Nabe; Daisuke
- Website: brahman-tc.com

Brahman (stylized as BRAHMAN) is a Japanese punk band formed in Tokyo in 1995. They are known for mixing hardcore with folk music.

== History ==
Brahman formed in Tokyo in 1995, when the band that Toshi-Low and Daisuke were in and the band that Ronzi and Makoto were in both disbanded, and the four musicians hit it off about the musical direction they wanted to go in. Their name comes from the Sanskrit word Brahman meaning "absolute reality", and represents their ethos of bringing Asian influences to the Western punk genre, including Okinawan, folk and gypsy music. They had their first concert at Shimokitazawa Shelter on August 9, 1995. After the 1996 release of the mini-album Grope Our Way, Daisuke left the band. The mini-album Wait and Wait was released in 1997, after which, guitarist Kohki joined. Their first studio album, 1998's A Man of the World, sold over 600,000 copies.

Brahman signed with major record label Toy's Factory in 1999. In 2001, they released their second album A Forlorn Hope, which sold over 500,000 copies. It was later released in America by Revelation Records in 2005.

To commemorate their 20th anniversary in 2015, Brahman hosted the two-day Jinmirai Festival (尽未来祭) at Makuhari Messe's International Exhibition Hall on November 14 and 15. It included acts such as 10-Feet, Acidman, Cocobat, Hi-Standard, Man with a Mission and The Hiatus.

Brahman conducted several events in celebration of their 30th anniversary, but three were the most prominent. First, they held a special concert at Yokohama Buntai on November 4, 2024, where they performed all 72 songs from their six major label studio albums. The second was the release of the studio album Viraha on February 26, 2025. The last was the 2025 edition of the Jinmirai Festival at Makuhari Messe's International Exhibition Halls 9–11 on November 22–24. Performing acts included Kuroyume, Ego-Wrappin', Orange Range, The Birthday, Buck-Tick and Luna Sea.

== Members ==
Current members

- Toshi-Low – vocals (1995–present)
- Makoto – bass (1995–present)
- Ronzi – drums (1995–present)
- Kohki – guitar (1997–present)

Former members

- Nabe – bass (1995)
- Daisuke – guitar (1995–1996)

== Discography ==
=== Studio albums ===
- A Man of the World (1998) Oricon Albums Chart peak: 99
- A Forlorn Hope (2001) 2
- The Middle Way (2004) 3
- Antinomy (2008) 4
- Eternal Recurrence (2009) 7
- Chōkoku (超克; 2013) 4
- Bonbai (梵唄 -bonbai-; 2018) 3
- Viraha (2025) 7

=== Mini-albums ===
- Grope Our Way (1996)
- Wait and Wait (1997)

=== Singles ===
| Year | Title | Chart Positions | Album |
| Year | Title | Oricon Singles Chart | Album |
|---|---|---|---|
| 2007 | "Handan's Pillow/Gyakko" | 8 | |
