= Clammbon =

Japanese musical trio

- Origin: Tokyo, Japan
- Genres: Alternative rock; indie pop; progressive rock; shibuya-kei
- Years active: 1996–present
- Labels: Nippon Columbia, Warner Music Japan, tropical
- Members: Ikuko Harada; Mito; Daisuke Itou
- Website: www.clammbon.com

Clammbon (クラムボン, Kuramubon) is a Japanese musical trio, consisting of vocalist/keyboardist Ikuko Harada, bassist Mito and drummer Daisuke Itou. The group, originally formed in 1996 when the three were students of the jazz department at SHOBI College of Music, made their major label debut on Warner Music Japan three years later. Their music is characterized by their quirky sound combining jazzy chord progressions with J-pop and electronica influences. They left their major label and went indie in 2015.

The name Clammbon is taken from a fictional character in the Kenji Miyazawa novel Yamanashi.

== Discography ==
=== Original albums ===
Year	Album Information	Oricon chart positions	Oricon sales figures
1999	JP: Released: October 6, 1999; Label: Warner Music Japan (WPC7-10031)	20	27,000
2000	Machiwabi Machisabi (まちわび まちさび): Released: October 25, 2000; Label: Warner Music Japan (WPCV-10104)	24	15,000
2001	Dramatic (ドラマチック, Doramachikku): Released: October 11, 2001; Label: Warner Music Japan (WPCV-10148)	18	19,000
2002	id: Released: October 23, 2002; Label: Warner Music Japan (WPCV-10201)	58	6,300
2003	Imagination: Released: November 19, 2003; Label: A&R Zero (COCP-50745)	50	9,500
2005	Ten, (てん、, Sky,): 2×CD set of identical tracks except for quality: CD1 is in mono, while CD2 is in stereo; Released: March 2, 2005; Label: A&R Zero (COCP-50845/6)	34	13,000
2007	Musical: Released: May 23, 2007; Label: A&R Zero (COCP-51029)	18	22,000
2010	2010: Released: May 19, 2010; Label: A&R Zero (COCP-36181)	11	13,000
2015	Triology: Released: March 25, 2015; Label: Nippon Columbia (COCP-39059)	13	–

=== EPs ===
Year	Album Information
1998	Kujirammbon (くじらむぼん, Kujiramubon): Released: February 25, 1998; Label: Warner Music Japan (WPC6-8408)
2009	Re-Clammbon E.P.: Digital download.; Released: April 8, 2009; Label: Tropical Co.
2010	Japanese Manner E.P.: Digital download.; Released: April 28, 2010; Label: Tropical Co.
2016	Moment E.P. (モメント e.p.): Physical copy only, limited release (tour venues and select retail locations); Released: February 4, 2016; Label: Tropical Co.; TRP-10007: Special album jacket with cloth tag (タグ付き特殊紙ジャケット仕様); TRP-10007A: Paper-only album jacket (紙ジャケット仕様)
2017	Moment E.P. 2 (モメント e.p. 2): Physical copy only, limited release (tour venues and select retail locations); Released: June 1, 2017; Label: Tropical Co. (TRP-10009)

=== Other albums ===
Year	Album Information	Oricon chart positions	Oricon sales figures
2002	Re-Clammbon: Remix album; Released: April 24, 2002; Label: Warner Music Japan (WPCV-10174)	49	7,000
2003	Best: Greatest hits album; Released: July 24, 2003; Label: Warner Music Japan (WPZL-30003/4)	54	9,600
2006	Lover Album: Cover album; Released: May 31, 2006; Label: A&R Zero (COCP-50924)	27	12,000
2006	3 Peace: Live at Hyakunengura (百年蔵): Live album (2×CD); Released: November 22, 2006; Label: A&R Zero (COCP-50962/3)	47	7,600
2009	Re-Clammbon 2: Remix album; Released: June 3, 2009; Label: A&R Zero (COCP-35574)	22	10,000
2011	Best: Greatest hits album; Released: April 20, 2011; Label: Nippon Columbia (COCP-36678)		
2012	3peace2: Live album (2×CD); Released: March 21, 2012; Label: Nippon Columbia (COCP-37264/5)	50	–
2013	Lover Album 2: Cover album; Released: May 22, 2013; Label: Nippon Columbia (COCP-37939)	19	–

=== Singles ===
Year	Title	Notes	Oricon chart positions	Oricon sales figures	Album
1999	"Hanare Banare" (はなれ ばなれ, Separated)		–	–	JP
1999	"Pan to Mitsu o Meshiagare" (パンと蜜をめしあがれ, Eating Bread and Honey)		72	3,300	JP
2000	"Chicago/246" (シカゴ, Shikago)		61	3,500	Machiwabi Machisabi
2000	"Kimi wa Boku no Mono/090" (君は僕のもの・０９０, You're Mine)		69	5,600	Machiwabi Machisabi
2001	"Surround" (サラウンド, Saraundo)		61	6,400	Dramatic
2001	"Zansho" (残暑, Late Summer Heat)		89	2,700	Dramatic
2006	"The New Song"		57	3,100	–
2009	"Now!!!"	Digital download	–	–	2010
2009	"Akari from Here (No Music, No Life.)" (あかり ｆｒｏｍ ＨＥＲＥ ～ＮＯ ＭＵＳＩＣ，ＮＯ ＬＩＦＥ．～, Light from Here)	A collaboration with Tha Blue Herb for Tower Records	24	10,000	2010
2010	"Tasogare" (黄昏, Evening)	Digital download	–	–	–
2011	"Hanasaku Iroha" (はなさくいろは, ABC of Blooming Flowers)	The ending theme (E14–26) for anime Hanasaku Iroha	–	–	Triology
2012	"Rough & Laugh"	The opening theme (E27–38) for anime Shirokuma Cafe	–	–	Triology
2015	"Yet"	A collaboration with Yoko Kanno	41	–	Triology
