= Dry & Heavy =

Japanese band

Dry & Heavy is a Japanese reggae and dub band, formed in 1991 by drummer Shigemoto Nanao (Dry) and bass player Takeshi Akimoto (Heavy). Their names come from the Burning Spear album of the same name. The line-up which recorded the album Dry & Heavy came together in 1995, with Naoki Uchida on dub controls, Mitsuhiro Toike on keyboards, Kei Horiguchi on guitar, and the vocal duo of Likkle Mai and Ao Inoue.

They were influenced by the 1970s Jamaican dub sound of King Tubby, Lee Perry and others.

In 2001, during Fuji Rock (Japan's largest music festival) founding member Takeshi Akimoto (Heavy) announced he was leaving the group, Audio Active's current bassist Pata, stepped in to fill the void. Takeshi Akimoto was the former bassist for Audio Active, and Shigemoto Nanao the former drummer of the same band.

As well as appearances at every major Japanese rock and reggae music festival, the band have enjoyed success with their own headline dates in the United Kingdom, France and Switzerland. Concert dates include the Reading and the Hanover based Womad Festivals, and guest appearances in Germany with Asian Dub Foundation and Buju Banton. They also played in Hong Kong with Primal Scream and Adrian Sherwood, and created their own Japanese dubfest, Echomaniacs. This has featured Adrian Sherwood, Andrew Weatherall, Dennis Bovell and 3 Head, and Dry & Heavy have played in concert with Lee Perry, Horace Andy, Jah Shaka and Mad Professor.

In 2015 they released a new studio album In Time and the band continues to tour.

== Band members ==
- Shigemoto Nanao: Drums
- Pata: Bass Guitar
- Likkle Mai: Vocal
- Ao Inoue: Vocal
- Mitsuhiro Toike: Keyboard
- The K: Guitar
- Naoyuki Uchida: Dub Control

== Discography ==
- Dry & Heavy (1997)

1. Law of the Jungle
2. Runs Good
3. Flash Flood
4. I'm A Likkle Lioness
5. Steppin' Out
6. Strange Flute
7. Bow and Arrow
8. Meditate Rocka
9. Mighty Gun

- One Punch (1999)

1. Mr. Blueflame
2. T.K.O.
3. Triumph
4. Harmony
5. Lost World
6. Say No More
7. Don't Give Up Your Fight
8. Herbal Wise
9. Night Flight
10. Gassy Disco
11. The Athlete

- Full Contact (2000)

1. Dawn Is Breaking
2. Heavy Special
3. Knife
4. King Cobra Syle
5. Rumble
6. Love Explosion
7. Love Explosion Version
8. Private Plan
9. Life In The Jungle
10. Less Is More
11. Less Is More Version
12. The Smoker's Cough
13. Landing

- King Jammy meets Dry and Heavy in the Jaws of the Tiger (2000)

1. Do Dub Up Your fight
2. Rumble Dub
3. Dub World
4. Radical Dubber
5. Mr. Dub
6. Breaking Dub
7. Private Plan Dub
8. Harmony Dub
9. Night Flight Dub
10. Tiger Claw Dub
11. Less Is Dub
12. Love Explosion Dub

- From Creation (2002)

1. Reverse Again
2. New Creation
3. Strictly Baby
4. Show A Fine Smile
5. Silent Drive
6. Watch Your Step
7. Kombu
8. The Dog And The Chicken
9. Don't Make The Children Cry
10. Riders On The Storm
11. Right Track
12. Bright Shining Star

- In Time (2015)

1. In Time 0:29
2. Lean On Me 4:44
3. Truth And Rights 3:37
4. Swing Easy 4:17
5. Cuss Cuss 4:13
6. Tempo 4:15
7. Shine Eye Gal 4:44
8. World A Music 4:12
9. Stalag 17 4:14
10. I'll Never Let You Go 3:41
11. Under Me Sleng Teng 4:12
12. Drum Song 5:12
13. Fast Car 3:47
14. Real Rock 3:57
15. Do You Love My Music 3:52
16. Dreamland 3:16
