= Banda Bassotti =

Italian musical group

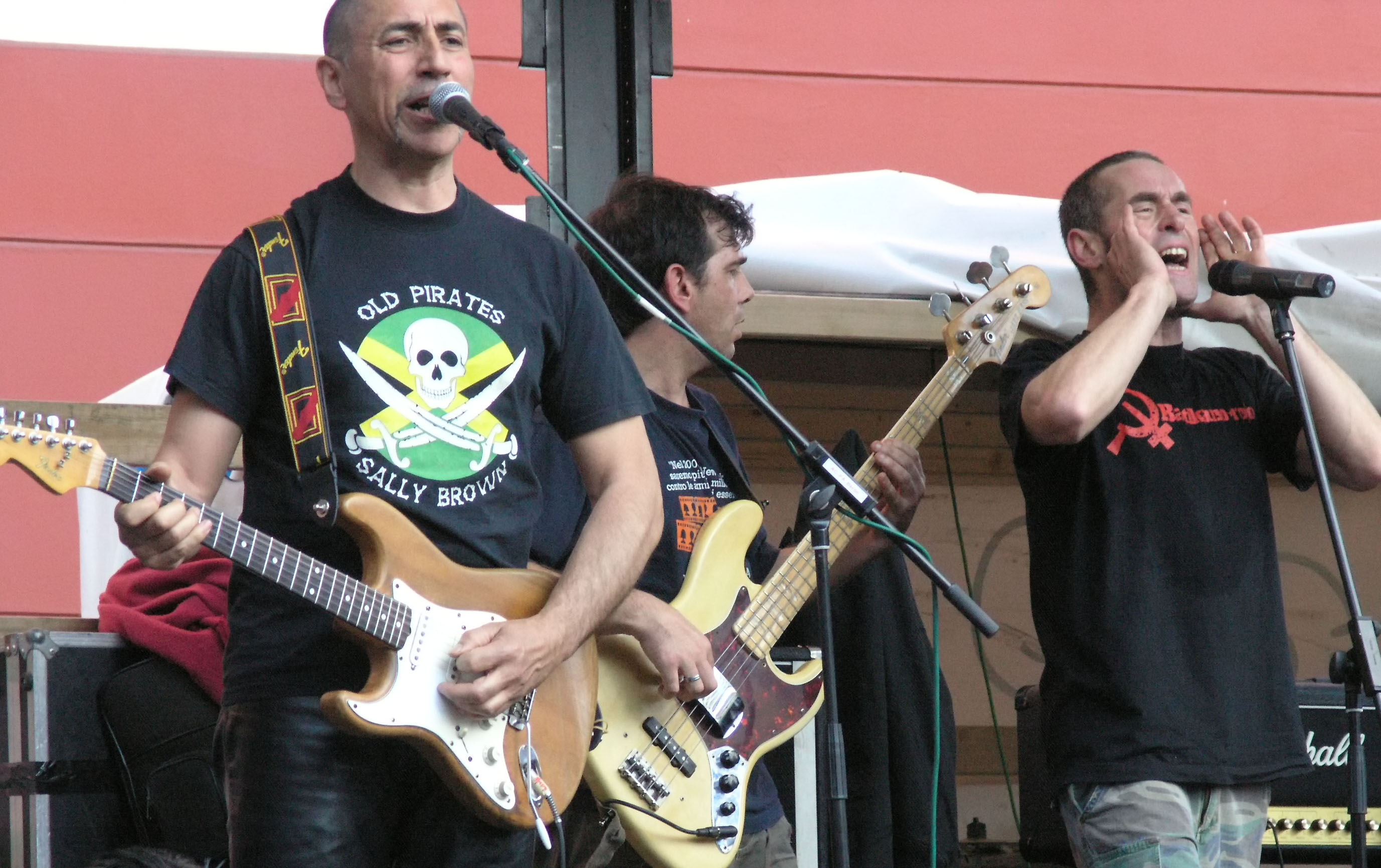
- Banda Bassotti performing live in 2008

Background information
- Origin: Rome, Italy
- Genres: Ska-punk, reggae, punk, ska
- Years active: 1987–1996, 2001–present
- Label: Gridalo Forte
- Members: Angelo Conti; Fabio Santarelli; Francesco Antonozzi; Gian Paolo Picchiami; Maurizio Gregori; Michele Frontino; Peppe; Sandro Travarelli
- Website: Banda Bassotti at Facebook

Banda Bassotti is an Italian ska-punk band formed in 1987 in Rome, Italy. Their songs are generally political in nature, focusing on communist and far-left issues. Many are about also politics of Ireland and Latin America. The band was inspired by The Clash and The Specials. The band was politically active from the beginning, attending protests and sympathizing with anti-fascist movements in Italy. Their name derives from the Italian version of the Disney characters Beagle Boys.

== Releases ==
Banda Bassotti released their first album Figli della stessa rabbia in 1991, which gained them a success amongst the local political and punk circles. In 1995, they released their second album Avanzo di cantiere recorded in the Basque Country with Kaki Arkarazo and Negu Gorriak. With this lineup the band toured Spain during the same year.

The band split up in 1996, only to be reunited in 2001 for a benefit concert. The reunited band introduced trombone and trumpet sections to their previously strictly guitar based punk lineup. The concert was released later the same year on the live album Un altro giorno d’amore. In March 2002, they released L’altra faccia dell’Impero, seven years after their last studio-album.

For the promotional tour for this album they played hundred of concerts in Spain, Italy and in Japan where they concluded the Fuji Rock Festival with the Red Hot Chili Peppers. Shocked and disappointed at the direction politics were taking in the following years all over the world with the rise of such politicians as George W. Bush and Silvio Berlusconi they decided to record Asi es mi vida, an album with popular political songs from all over the world. In 2004 they released the album Amore e odio and toured Germany for the first time.

In September 2014, the band's tour called 'No Pasaran' took in Rome, Moscow, Rostov and the Donbas region.

The vocalist with the band, Angelo Conti, died at the age of 62 on 11 December 2018.

== Discography ==
- 1992 – Figli della stessa rabbia ("Children of the Same Rabble")
- 1993 – Bella ciao ("Hey Good Looking")
- 1995 – Avanzo de cantiere ("Remains of a Construction Site")
- 2001 – Un altro giorno d'amore ("Another Day of Love")
- 2002 – L'altra faccia dell'impero ("The Other Face of the Empire")
- 2003 – Asì es mi vida ("This Is My Life")
- 2004 – Amore e odio ("Love and Hate")
- 2004 – Baldi e fieri ("Bold and Proud")
- 2006 – Vecchi cani bastardi ("Old Bastard Dogs")
- 2008 – Viento, lucha y sol ("Wind, Fight and Sun")
- 2010 – Check Point Kreuzberg – Live at SO36 – Berlin
- 2012 – Siamo guerriglia ("We Are Guerrilla")
- 2013 – "Rumbo al Socialismo XXI" ("Onward to Socialism XXI")
- 2014 – Banditi Senza Tempo ("Bandits Out of Time")
