= Special Others =

Japanese band

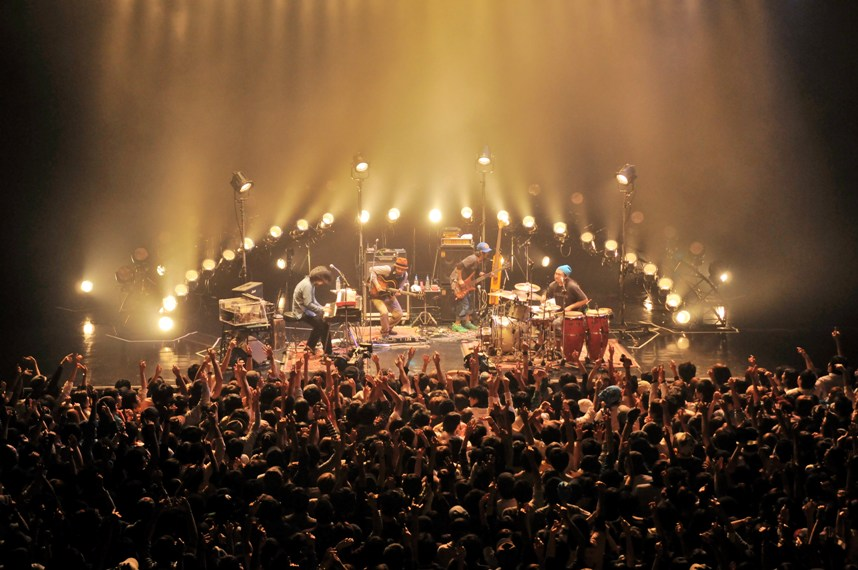
- Special Others band in 2010

Background information
- Origin: Yokohama, Japan
- Genres: Post-rock, jazz
- Years active: 1995–present
- Labels: Babe Star; NMNL Records; Victor
- Members: Miyahara "Toyin" Ryōta; Mitayoshi "Segun" Yūya; Yanagishita "Dayo" Takeshi; Serizawa "Remi" Yūma
- Website: www.specialothers.com

Special Others is a Japanese band that blends improvised jazz with post-rock influences. Their lyrics on non-instrumental songs mix English and Japanese. The members of the band met in high school and formed the group in 1995. They began performing in 2000 and their first major release, Indy-Ann, remained in the CRJ-tokyo charts for seven weeks.

Their first release on NMNL Records was the EP Ben which entered the Tower Records Shibuya indie chart at No. 1, and No. 2 in the national Tower Records chart. After releasing their second EP, Uncle John, in June 2005, the band played at the Fuji Rock Festival in July.

In June 2006, they released Idol, which was followed by a performance at Daikanyama UNIT in July, the release Aims at Tower Records in October, and the release of their first full album, Good Morning, on November 22. The band toured with Asian Kung-Fu Generation from late 2006, with guest appearances at five performances across Japan.

== Band members ==
- Ryōta "Toyin" Miyahara (宮原良太) (b. 1979) - Drums, vocals
- Yūya "Segun" Matayoshi (又吉優也) (b. 1979) - Bass
- Takeshi "Dayo" Yanagishita (柳下武史) (b. 1980) - Guitar, vocals
- Yūma "Remi" Serizawa (芹澤優真) (b. 1979) - Keyboard, vocals

== Discography ==
=== Studio albums ===
- Ben (2004/08/18) EP/Mini Album
  1. Ben
  2. Ngoro Ngoro
  3. Peacefultree
  4. Cacao
  5. Khechi Khechi
- Dubwise (2005/06/10) Limited edition 12" single
- [Side-A]
  1. Mellotron
  2. Khechi Khechi (Uchida Naoyuki Dub mix)
- [Side-B]
  1. Mellotron (Iwaki Kentarou remix)
  2. Random
- Uncle John (2005/06/22) EP/Mini album
  1. Sunshine
  2. Random
  3. Uncle John
  4. Meal
  5. Mellotron
- Idol (2006/06/07) EP/Mini album
  1. Idol
  2. Aului
  3. Saudade
  4. Mambo No.5
  5. Quinto
- Quinto Limited edition 12" single
- [Side-A]
  1. Saudade (Kl mix)
  2. Mambo No.5 (Milch of Source remix)
- [Side-AA]
  1. Mambo No.5
  2. Quinto
- Aims (2006/10/11) Tower Records limited-edition single
  1. Aims
  2. Mambo No.5 (live)
  3. Mellotron (live)
- Good Morning (2006/11/22/)
  1. Aims
  2. Good Morning
  3. Circle
  4. Yagi&Ryota
  5. Around the World
  6. Session
  7. Koya
  8. Comboy
  9. KHN
  10. Door of the Cosmos (The Stars Are Singing Too)
- Surdo (2007/04/27) Tower Records limited-edition single
  1. Surdo
  2. Aims (live)
  3. Meltoron (live)
- Star (2007/05/23)
  1. Star
  2. Surdo
  3. When You Wish upon a Star
  4. All Things - Part 1
  5. All Things - Part 2
  6. Aului 80 - Self remix
- Laurentech (2007/11/14) Tower Records limited-edition single
  1. Laurentech
  2. Star (live)
  3. Ben (live)
- Quest (2008/02/06)
  1. Night Paradise
  2. Laurentech
  3. Ovelia
  4. Quest
  5. Bump
  6. Johnson
  7. Apollo
  8. Ubiquitous
  9. ACN
  10. Hankachi
- PB (2009/04/01)
  1. Title
  2. PB
  3. Stay
  4. SP in Wednesday
  5. Charlie
  6. Silent
  7. Potato
  8. Twilight
  9. Life
  10. Sunrise
- The Guide (2010/10/06)
  1. Wait for The Sun
  2. It's my house
  3. Parabola
  4. The Guide
  5. Luster
  6. Draft
  7. Tomorrow
  8. RCA (MONO)
  9. Go home
  10. Ido
- Special Others (2011/11/30)
  1. Sailin' feat. kJ (from Dragon Ash)
  2. Ano Kuni Made feat. Nobuo Ooki (from ACIDMAN) & Atsushi Horie (from STRAIGHTENER)
  3. Karappo feat. Kiyosaku (from MONGOL800)
  4. Iyomante Upopo feat. MAREWREU
  5. Dance In Tsurumi feat. Masafumi Goto (from ASIAN KUNG-FU GENERATION)
  6. Door feat. Cypress Ueno & Roberto Yoshino
- Have A Nice Day (2012/10/10)
  1. ROOT
  2. ORION
  3. Raindrops
  4. beautiful world
  5. ORGAN BASS
  6. Hawaiian Secret Beat
  7. barrel
  8. Dance Festival
  9. Provence
  10. Have a Nice Day

== See also ==
- List of post-rock bands
