= Tha Blue Herb =

Japanese alternative hip hop trio

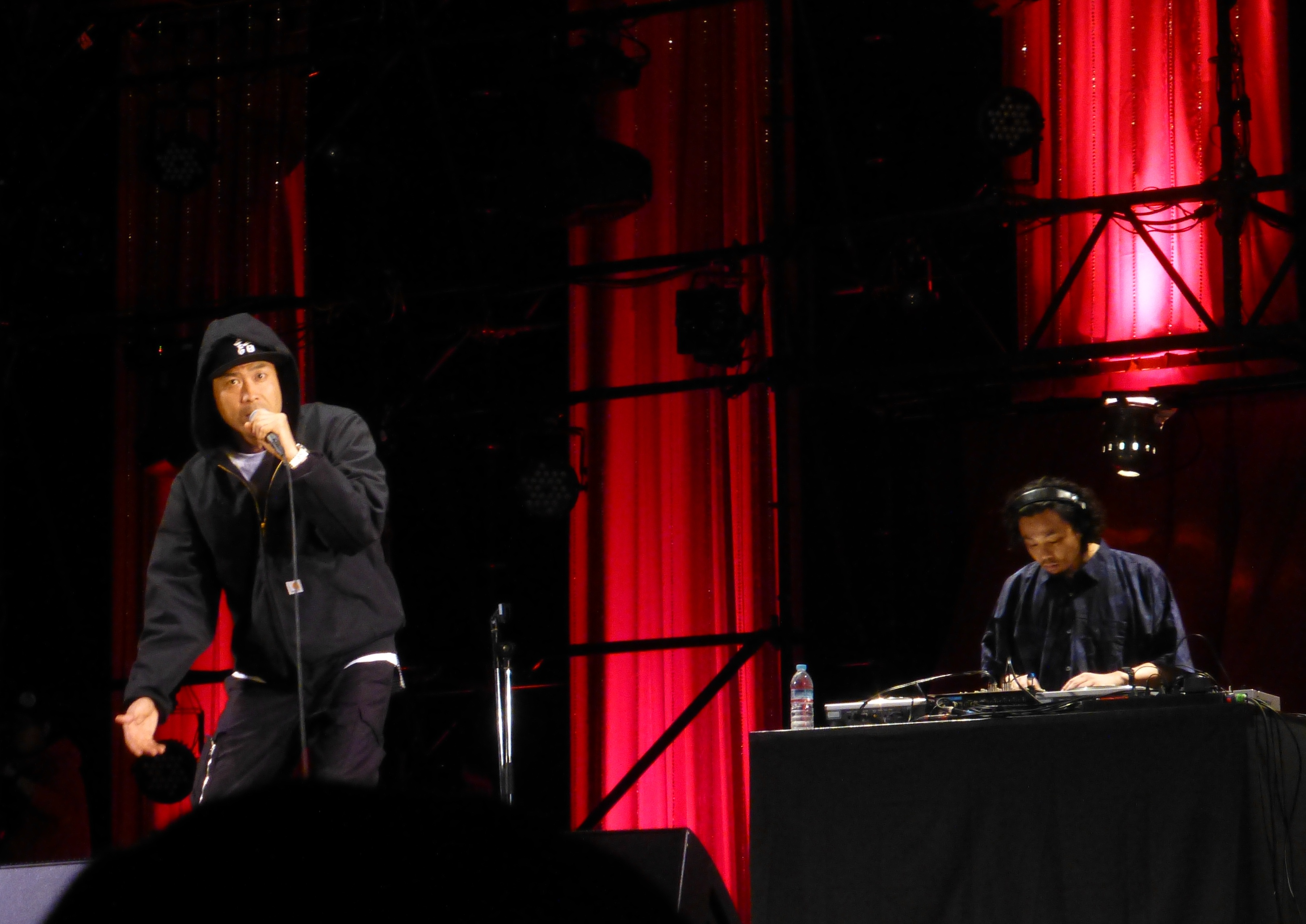
- Tha Blue Herb live on stage, 2016

Background information
- Origin: Sapporo, Hokkaido, Japan
- Genres: Alternative hip hop Experimental hip hop Underground hip hop
- Years active: 1997–present
- Label: Tha Blue Herb Records
- Members: Ill-Bosstino; O.N.O. DJ Dye
- Website: tbhr.co.jp

Tha Blue Herb is a Japanese alternative hip hop trio based in Sapporo, Hokkaido. They formed in 1997 and now consist of three members: Boss the MC a.k.a. Ill-Bosstino (MC), O.N.O. (producer, formerly live DJ until DJ Dye joined Tha Blue Herb in 1999) and DJ Dye (live DJ). They also run a record label called Tha Blue Herb Recordings.

James Hadfield of The Japan Times described Tha Blue Herb as "the Company Flow of Japanese hip-hop."

Beside releasing several albums and singles as the group, O.N.O. also released solo works, while Ill-Bosstino participated in Herbest Moon (with producer Wachall) and Japanese Synchro System (with producer Calm) and also worked with DJ Krush and Audio Active amongst others.

== Discography ==
=== Albums ===
- Stilling, Still Dreaming (1998)
- Sell Our Soul (2002)
- Life Story (2007)
- Total (2012)

=== EPs ===
- Underground vs. Amateur (2000)
- Front Act (2002)
- The Future Is in Our Hands (2003)
- The Way Hope Goes (2005)
- Phase 3 (2007)

=== Singles ===
- "The Shock-Shine Revolt" (1998)
- "The Ring of Wisdom / The Wind Blows from the North" (1998)
- "Underground vs. Amateur" (1999)
- "Times Are Changing" (2000)
- "Trans-Sapporo Express" (2000)
- "Annui Dub: Thank You Very Much My Friend" (2000)
- "3 Days Jump" (2001)
- "Front Act" (2002)
- "The Future Is in Our Hands" (2003)
- "Roads of The Underground" (2004)
- "Chie no Dub / Pusher on the Street" (2005)
- "My Work / My Faith" (2006)
- "Phase 3" (2007)
- "The Suburbs of Hip Hop / A Special Night" (2007)
- "Straight Years" (2009)

=== Soundtracks ===
- Heat: Original Soundtrack (2004) a soundtrack album for Heat

=== DVDs ===
- Enbu (2007)
- That's the Way Hope Goes (2007)
- Straight Days (2009)
