= Aburadako =

Japanese noise punk band

- Origin: Japan
- Genres: Noise rock, hardcore punk, avant-garde, math rock, post-punk
- Members: Hirotomo Hasegawa; Hiroshi Komachi; Kenichi Itoh; Masato Ookuni

Aburadako (あぶらだこ) is a Japanese noise punk band. Their name means "Greasy Octopus". A notable oddity is that none of Aburadako's albums have titles and are only distinguished by their packages. In September 2007, Rolling Stone Japan rated their 1985 studio album at No. 55 on its list of the "100 Greatest Japanese Rock Albums of All Time".

== Discography ==
=== Singles ===
- 'Aburadako / Yokujitsu' (9/8/2002) - This is a privately copied CD-R recording of their performance and called "CD-R"
- 'Aburadako / Yokujitsu' (1/24/2004) - This is called "Kami-jake" because of its paper packaging.

=== Albums ===
Each album is titled Aburadako. They are differentiated primarily by their cover. Catalogue numbers are provided by the respective record companies. The 2008 compilation of the band's early work from 1983 to 1985 breaks this trend.

- Aburadako (8/?/1983) - The debut album is a 7-inch sonosheet and is called "ADK Sono-sheet".
- Aburadako (9/?/1984) - This is a 12-inch LP referred to as "ADK 12 inch"
- Aburadako (8/?/1985) - The package is a photo of a tree in the sunset, called "Ki-ban". TOKUMA JAPAN TKCA-70827
- Aburadako (12/?/1986) - The package is navy blue, called "Ao-ban". TOKUMA JAPAN TKCA-70828
- Aburadako (4/?/1989) - The package is a photo of a turtle, called "Kame-ban". TOKUMA JAPAN TKCA-70829
- Aburadako (1/?/1996) - The package is a photo of a man holding a fish, called "Tsuri-ban"
- Aburadako (12/?/1999) - The package is a drawing of a man, called "OK-ban". KING Record KICS 521
- Aburadako (10/25/2000) - The package is a photo of a full moon, called "Tsuki-ban". MIDI MDCL1397
- Aburadako (??/??/2002) - DIWPHALANX PX-115
- Aburadako (11/9/2004) - This package is a dark tunnel with a light at the end P-vine PCD-5860
- Aburadako (??/??/2008) - The package is a photo of a boat on water, called "Fune". P-vine PCD-18532
- Aburadako (??/??/2008) - "ADK 1983-1985". OKRecords OK-0007 / P-vine PCD-93130.
