= Audio Active =

Japanese reggae fusion band

- Origin: Japan
- Genres: Reggae fusion, dub, experimental
- Years active: 1987 – 2005
- Labels: Gyroscope, On-U Sound, Warner Music Group, Beat, Dream Machine
- Past members: Masa; 2DD; Shigemoto Nanao; Takeshi Akimoto; Kasai

Audio Active were a Japanese reggae fusion band who released several albums between the early 1990s and the first decade of the 21st century.

== History ==
Audio Active were one of the most successful reggae fusion bands to come out of Japan, and were formed in 1987, originally being a solo project of singer Masa. It later stretched out to be a full band in 1991, when 2DD, Shigemoto Nanao and bassist Takeshi Akimoto all joined. Masa had listened to reggae since he was a teenager, and had played (with 2DD) in the ska band Vital Connection, before taking his love of roots reggae and dub music and forming Audio Active, named after an album by Dennis Bovell. Adrian Sherwood began working with the band in 1992, and produced many of their recordings. The band's debut album The Way Out is the Way In, was recorded with zither player Laraaji, and Sherwood produced their Happy Shopper in Europe album, released on his On-U Sound label in 1995. Their 1997 album Apollo Choco was described by Allmusic as "an example of new and exciting dub, which shows Audio Active's true capabilities". Further albums followed on On-U Sound, Warner Music Group, and Gyroscope, the last, Back To The Stoned Age, released in 2003. The band were strongly influenced by Lee "Scratch" Perry, with elements of hip hop.

Original member Akimoto left, to be replaced by Kasai. Akimoto, along with Nanao, formed the lovers-rock influenced band Dry & Heavy.

== Discography ==
=== Albums ===
- Audio Active (1993) Alfa
- We are Audio Active (Tokyo Space Cowboys) (1994) On-U Sound/Musidisc
- We are Experienced (1994) Beat
- Happy Happer (1995) On-U Sound
- More Tokyo Space Cowboys (1995) Beat
- The Way Out is the Way In (1995) Gyroscope/All Saints (Audio Active & Laraaji)
- Apollo Choco (1997) On-U Sound/Beat
- Apollo Choco Remixed (1997) On-U Sound
- Return of the Red I (1999) Warner Music/Dream Machine
- aLteRED I (1999) Warner Music/Dream Machine
- Spaced Dolls (2001) Dream Machine/Warner Music/East West/Beat
- Back To The Stoned Age (2003) Beat
- Sound Crash: Slash & Mix - Adrian Sherwood (2006) Beat

=== Singles ===
- "Free the Marijuana" (1994) On-U Sound (featuring Bim Sherman)
- "Wanna-Na" (1994) Beat
- "Electric Bombardment" (1995) On-U Sound
- "Happy Shopper" (1995) On-U Sound
- Happy Shopper in Europe EP (1995) On-U Sound
- The Way Out/The Way In EP (1995) Gyroscope
- "24 Hours Exploration" (1996) The Massive Recording Co.
- Startrec EP (1996) On-U Sound
- Audio Active EP (1997) Beat/Plus Minus
- "Robot War" (1997) Beat
- "Weed Specialist" (1997) Beat
- Spawn EP (1998) Polystar (Air & Audio Active)
- "What's Inside Your Afro?" (1998) Green Tea (Audio Active/Universe Crew)
- "Bag Filled With Emptiness" (1999) Dream Machine/Warner Music
- "Idle Dragon" (1999) Beat
- "Kick The Bong Around" (1999) Beat
- "Psycho Buds" (1999) Beat
- Bong EP (2000) Birdman
- Happers EP (2000) Beat
- "You're No Good" (2001) Dream Machine
- Melt 1 EP (2002) Beat
- "Frozen Head" (2003) Beat
- Stoned EP (2003) Beat
- Melt 2 EP (2004) Beat
