= Your Song Is Good =

Japanese band

- Origin: Japan
- Genres: Ska; Calypso music
- Years active: 1998-present
- Labels: Kakubarhythm; Universal J/Nayutawave Records
- Members: Jun "JxJx" Saito (Organ, Vocals); Masatomo "Maurice" Yoshizawa (Guitar); Koji "Shiraishi" Shiraishi (Guitar); Yasuhiko "Shorty" Hattori (Trombone); Hiroyuki "DaaaaTaka" Takada (Bass); Reiji "ZeeeeRay" Tanaka (Drums)
- Past members: Takeo Matsumura (Bass); Hiroki Moriya (Bass)
- Website: kakubarhythm.com

Your Song Is Good (stylized as YOUR SONG IS GOOD and often abbreviated YSIG) is a Japanese ska band. They are signed to Nayutawave Records (a Universal Music label) and Kakubarhythm.

== History ==
YSIG began first as punk band School Jackets. Formed in the spring of 1997 by the four members of Nuts & Milk along with former Fruity frontman Jun "JxJx" Saito, the band pioneered a raw, frantic blend of thrash, funk, punk, ska and soul. Saito said that he had wanted to create a blend of The Jackson 5 and Charles Bronson. Most songs remained under 1 minute - most under 30 seconds. Despite increasing popularity, the band decided to call it quits and reinvent themselves.

From School Jackets' ashes, Your Song Is Good was born in 1998 with all of the same members intact. They initially took to a melodic hardcore direction influenced by late 1980s DC bands such as Dag Nasty and early 1990s emo . But this again was short-lived and they quickly left this sound behind to reinvent themselves once more as an instrumental post-rock band. Exploring the instrumental form, it was from this state that the band would grow into what they are today. Ska influences from their previous bands - in particular The Specials - would soon resurface and a trombone player (Hattori) would be added to the fold. As their musical goals came into focus, they came to the realization that they may not be ready to play what they heard in their heads. It was at this time that the band went seemingly quiet.

After an extended period of time, Your Song is Good eventually began producing again. They combined elements from ska, soul, funk and calypso, they distilled their punk energy into a refined, and uniquely Japanese sense of melody.

Their first properly recorded effort was released in 2002 as a 7-inch EP called "Big Stomach, Big Mouth". This would also serve as the first record on their new label, Kakuba Rhythm. It would prove to be the first crucial step for a band - as well as a label - whose popularity would grow exponentially in the following years.

== Timeline ==
- 1998
  - January - Your Song Is Good is formed by members of thrash punk band School Jackets.
- 2000
  - May - Trombonist Yasuhiko "Shorty" Hattori (ハットリ "ショ～ティ" ヤスヒコ) joins.
- 2001
  - Bassist Hiyoruki "Daataka" Takada (タカダ "ダ～タカ" ヒロユキ) joins.
- 2002
  - March - 1st 7-inch EP "Big Stomach, Big Mouth" (KAKU-01) is released on their new label Kakuba Rhythm.
  - August - 1st mini-album "Come On" (KAKU-02) is released.
  - December - 2nd 7-inch EP "Good Bye/Ka Cuba" (KAKU-03) is released.
- 2003
  - September - 3rd 7-inch EP "Super Soul Meetin'/Sweet Spot" (KAKU-06) is released.
- 2004
  - October - 1st full album "Your Song IS Good" (KAKU-010) is released.
- 2005
  - April - Saito and Toru Hidaka (of Beat Crusaders) take over the video DJ position at Space Shower TV (Studio Grown).
  - November - Split 7-inch EP "Your Song Is Good ft Irurime/Mu-Stars ft. Zakkan Morimoto (of BREAKfAST)" (KAKU-016) is released.
- 2006
  - May 3 - Split album with Beat Crusaders "Booootsy" is released.
  - July 5 - Major Label Debut mini-Album "Fever" is released on Universal/Kakuba Rhythm.
- 2007
  - April 11 - 1st Single "Aitsu Ni Yoroshiku" (あいつによろしく) is released.
  - May 16 - 2nd Full Album "Hot!Hot!Hot!Hot!Hot!Hot!" is released on Universal/Kakuba Rhythm.
- 2008
  - April 23 - 2nd single "The ReAction E.P." (Limited Edition with DVD) is released.
  - July 23 - 3rd Album " The Action" is released.
- 2009
  - May 13 - Live and Documentary 3 disc DVD "PLAY ALL !!!!!! live, accident, history, idea, We are YSIG 1998-2008" is released.
- 2010
  - March 3 - 4th full album "B.A.N.D." is released
  - June 2 - Soundtrack CD "Seaside Motel Original Soundtrack"
  - December 1 - Live DVD "B.A.N.D.T.O.U.R.FINAL at Hibiya Ongakudo" (B.A.N.D.T.O.U.R.FINAL 日比谷野外大音楽堂)
- 2011
  - May 21 - Live CD single "I WANT YOU BACK EP" is released.
  - October 12 - Greatest hits album "BEST" is released.
- 2013
  - November 20 - 5th full album "OUT" is released.

== Members ==
=== Current ===
Jun "JxJx" Saitō (サイトウ "JxJx" ジュン) - Organ and Vocals
Name: Born Jun Saito (斉藤淳 / さいとうじゅん) in 1973. From Hyōgo Prefecture. Graduated in Tokyo.
Ex-Fruity (Vocals and later Drums)/Ex-School Jackets (Vocals).
Gear: Uses a Hammond XK-2. Initially used a Fender Rhodes.

Masatomo "Maurice" Yoshizawa (ヨシザワ "モ〜リス" マサトモ) - Guitar
Name： Masatomo Yoshizawa (吉澤成友 / よしざわまさとも)
Ex-Nuts & Milk (Vocals) / Ex-School Jackets (Vocals & Trombone).
In charge of Album Art Design and Merchandise Design.
Gear: Uses several Semi-acoustic guitars, initially used an Epiphone Emperor II. Recently has been using a Fender Stratocaster.

Kōji "Shiraishi" Shiraishi (シライシ "シライシ" コウジ) - Guitar
Name：Kōji Shiraishi (白石浩二 / しらいしこうじ). From Chiba Prefecture. Graduated in Kisarazu.
Ex-Nuts & Milk (Guitar)/Ex-School Jackets (Guitar).
Gear: Fender Telecaster

Yasuhiko "Shorty" Hattori (ハットリ "ショ〜ティ" ヤスヒコ) - Trombone
Name: Yasuhiko Hattori (服部康彦 / はっとりやすひこ)
Joined in 2000. Currently the oldest member of the band.

Hiroyuki "DaaaaTaka" Takada (タカダ "ダ〜タカ" ヒロユキ) - Bass
Joined in 2001. The third bassist and the youngest member in the band.
Was a Salaryman but recently quit.

Reiji "ZeeeeRay" Tanaka (タナカ "ズィ〜レイ" レイジ) - Drums
Ex-Nuts & Milk (Vocals & Drums)/Ex-School Jackets (Drums).

=== Supporting members ===
- Matsui Izumi (松井泉) - Bongos/Percussion (2013 - )

=== Former ===
- Takeo Matsumura (マツムラ タケオ) - Bass (1998-2000)
- Hiroki Moriya (モリヤ ヒロキ) - Bass (2000-2001)

== Discography ==
=== 7-inch EPs ===
- Big Stomach, Big Mouth/Love Generation (KAKU-001) - March 2002
- Good Bye/Ka Cuba (KAKU-003) - December 2002
- Super Sould Meetin'/Sweet Spot (KAKU-006) - August 2003
- Your Song Is Good x Irurime (イルリメ)/Mu-Stars x Zakkan Morimoto (森本雑感/Breakfast) (KAKU-016) - November 2005

=== Mini-albums ===
- Come On (August 9, 2002)
- Booootsy (May 3, 2006) Beat Crusaders split album
- Fever (July 5, 2006)

=== Albums ===
- Your Song Is Good (October 6, 2004)
- Hot!Hot!Hot!Hot!Hot!Hot! (May 16, 2007)
- The Action! (July 23, 2008)
- B.A.N.D. (March 3, 2010)

=== Singles ===
- Aitsu Ni Yoroshiku (あいつによろしく) (April 11, 2007)
  1. Aitsu Ni Yoroshiku (TBS series "Count Down TV" Ending) - あいつによろしく TBS「Count Down TV」2007年4度エンディングテーマ）
  2. Bugaru Choutokkyuu (ブガルー超特急)
  3. Fever Mu-Stars Double-Three-Seven-Mix
- The ReAction EP (April 23, 2008)
  1. A Man from the New Town
  2. Move or Die
  3. 10Inch Stomp
  4. The Reaction Baby

=== DVD ===
- Play All!!!!!! live, accident, history, idea, We are YSIG 1998-2008 (May 13, 2009)

=== Other works ===
1. Sound Sketch (February 5, 2003)
  5.Love Generation
2. Doping Panda "Remixies for 3Years" (September 19, 2003)
  2.Tabloid Pubrock (Tabloid Pubrock Is Good Mix: Your Song Is Good)
3. "Mosh Pit on Disney" (July 28, 2004)
  22.Under the Sea
4. "Rock Motwon" (February 23, 2005)
  9.You Can't Hurry Love
5. Mu-Stars "Check1,2" (November 9, 2005)
  16.Funky Soysauce featuring Your Song Is Good
6. "Husking Bee" (March 21, 2007)
  12.後に跡
7. "アイのうた" (December 5, 2007)
  13.オイ、オレ、オマエ。: “Oi, Ole, Oh-Mae” Calypso
