= Husking Bee =

Japanese band

Husking Bee are a Japanese powerpop/punk band formed in 1994.

According to Oricon, HUSKING BEE's member were Isobe Masafumi (on Vocals), Kudo "Tekkin" Tetsuya(on Bass) and Hiramoto Leona (on Drums). They debuted in 1995 by "NOT SUPERSTITIOUS III". Hirabayashi Kazuya, today the lead singer and guitarist to the band Fine Lines, joined as a new member in 2000. Despite having many Japanese young fans, they dissolved without explaining the reasons behind their decision on 6 March 2005.

The band reunited in February 2012.

== Discography ==
- GRIP (1996)
- Put on Fresh Paint (1999)
- The Sun and the Moon EP (2000)
- FOUR COLOR PROBLEM (2001), distributed in the US by Doghouse Records
- the steady-state theory (2002)
- variandante (2004)
- ANTHOLOGY [1994~2004] (2005)
- SOMA (2013)
- AMU (2014)
- eye (2020)

== In other media ==
- Hirabayashi Kazuya provided the singing voice for the Koyuki Tanaka character, in the anime adaptation of BECK. The band also contributed the song "Brightest" to the series' second original soundtrack.
