= The Birthday (band) =

Japanese garage rock band

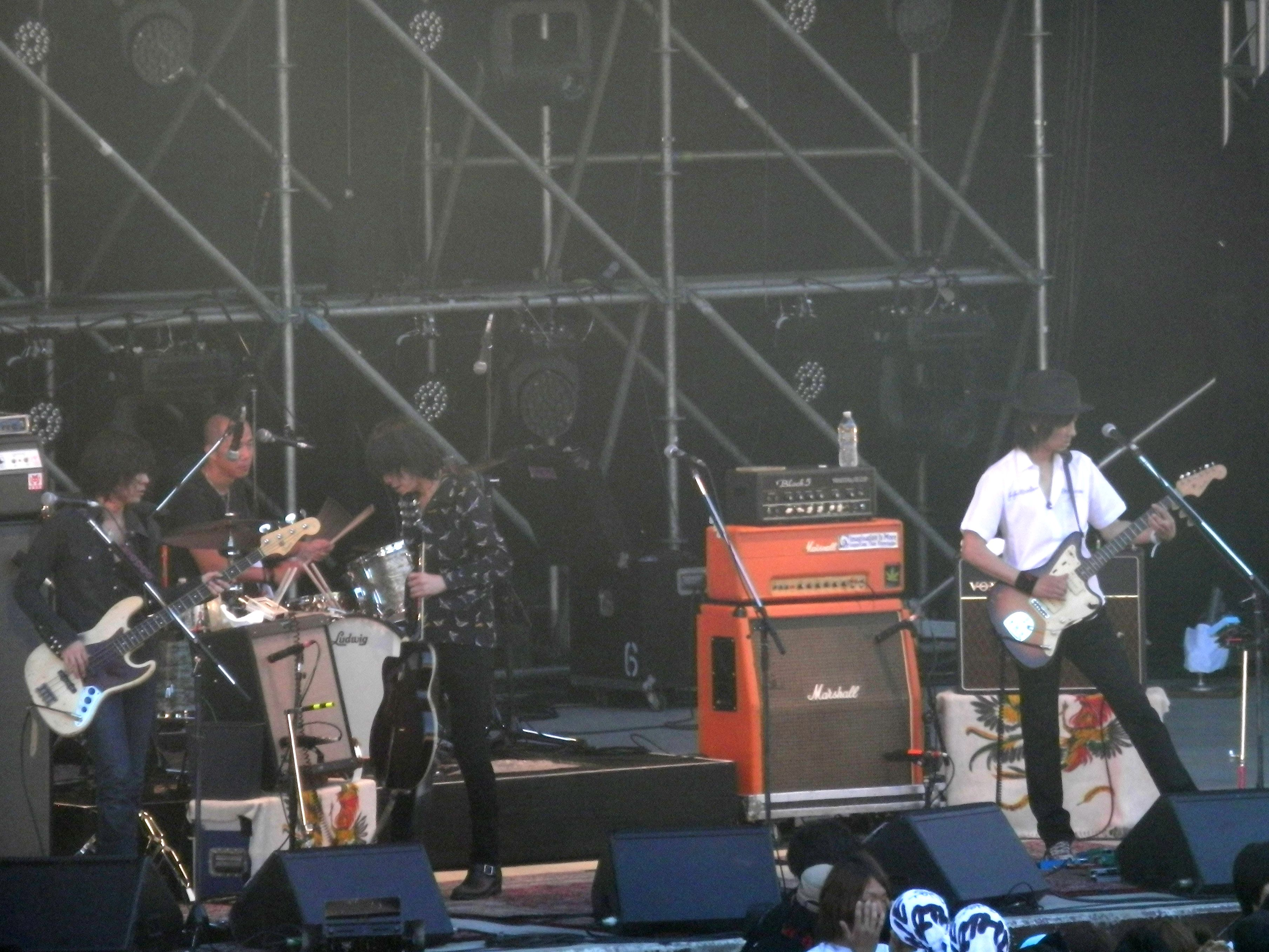

Background information
- Origin: Japan
- Genres: Garage rock; Blues rock; Punk rock
- Years active: 2006–present
- Label: Universal Music Group
- Members: Kenji Fujii; Haruki Hirai; Kazuyuki Kuhara
- Past members: Yusuke Chiba; Akinobu Imai
- Website: The Birthday

The Birthday is a Japanese garage rock band formed by Yusuke Chiba and members of his previous bands, Rosso and Thee Michelle Gun Elephant.

== History ==
In June, 2006, Chiba and Imai announced the release of Rosso's album Emissions, and also that Rosso would go on a hiatus. Immediately after the Birthday was formed and in August of the same year, their first single Stupid was released. The band was formed with Yusuke Chiba as the leader, but with the intention that all the members would contribute to the songwriting process. In 2011 the band's lead guitarist Akinobu Imai left and in the same year Kenji Fujii, famous in Japan as a guitarist and songwriter of My Little Lover, joined them after a hiatus of some months.

In April 2023, Chiba announced that he was going on hiatus to get treatment for esophageal cancer. In December 2023, it was publicly announced that he died on November 26.

== Discography ==
The Birthday released many full-length albums, singles, EPs as well as several live show recordings on DVD and Blu-ray. Album and single releases are usually available as a standard and a limited edition with bonus DVD.

=== Albums ===
- Rollers Romantics (2006)
- Teardrop (2007)
- Motel Radio Sixty Six (mini-album) (2008)
- Night on Fool (2008)
- Star Blows (2010)
- I'm Just a Dog (2011)
- Vision (2012)
- Come Together (2014)
- Blood and Love Circus (2015)
- Nomad (2017)
- Vivian Killers (2019)
- Sunburst (2021)

=== Singles ===
- "Stupid" (2006)
- "Kiki the Pixy" (2006)
- "Night Line" (2007)
- "Alicia" (2007)
- "Press Factory" (2007)
- "Namida Ga Koboresou" (2008)
- "Ai de Nuritsubuse" (2009)
- "Piano" (2009)
- "Dig Zero" (2010)
- "Maddy Cat Blues" (2010)
- "Nazeka Kyouha" (2011)
- "Roka" (2012)
- "Sayonara Saisyuuheiki" (2012)
- "Lemon" (2013)
- "Kusottare no Sekai" (2014)
- "I Know" (2015)
- "Mother" (2015)
- "Yume to Bach to Caffeine to" (2016)
- "Dakishimetai" (2017)
- "The Answer" (2018)
- "Aozora" (2018)
- "Oh Baby!" (2019)
- CORE 4 (2021)
- Tsukiyo no Zankyou ep. (2022)
- Love Rockets (2023)
- April (2024)

=== Compilations ===
- Watch Your Blindside (B-side and rare track collection) (2010)
- Gold Trash (Greatest hits album) (2015)
- Watch Your Blindside 2 (B-side and rare track collection) (2019)

=== Other releases ===
- Party People (2008)
- The Birthday Meets Love Grocer at On-U Sound Mixed by Adrian Sherwood (2009)
- Live at XXXX (live album) (2018)
- Live at Nakano Sunplaza 2022 "GO WEST.YOUNGMAN" (live album) (2024)
