= Rosso (band) =

ROSSO
- Origin: Japan
- Genres: Garage rock; punk blues
- Years active: 2001–2006
- Labels: Universal; Alive
- Website: www.rockin-blues.com

Rosso was a Japanese band formed as a side project by Yusuke Chiba, and former Blankey Jet City bassist Toshiyuki Terui.

== Members ==
For BIRD

- Yusuke Chiba – guitar / vocal (ex-TMGE)
- Toshiyuki Terui – bass (ex-Blankey Jet City)
- MASATO – drums (ex-Assfort)

For DIRTY KARAT and EMISSIONS

- Yusuke Chiba – guitar / vocal (ex-TMGE)
- Toshiyuki Terui – bass (ex-Blankey Jet City)
- Akinobu Imai – guitar
- Minoru Sato – drums

== Discography ==
=== Albums ===
Bird (2002)
1. Wakusei ni Escalator
2. Sharon
3. Midnight Condoru
4. Jerry Love
5. I Love Punk
6. Karipuso Baby
7. Motor Pool
8. Grasshopper wa Noheru
9. Hoshi no Melody
10. Monkey Love Sick

Dirty Karat (2004)
1. Outsider
2. 1000 Tambourines
3. Lemon Crazy
4. Chad In Hell
5. Handle Mama
6. Pierce
7. Tulip
8. Doubutsu Party
9. Sweet Jimi
10. Hitogoroshi
11. Kimi No Hikari To Boku No Kage
12. Kasei No Scorpion

Emissions (2006)
1. nemuranai jiru
2. Rooster
3. Wall
4. hakkou

=== Live albums ===
- The Night When Diamond Dust Fell...

=== Singles ===
- 1000 Tambourines
- Outsider
- Vanilla
- 1000 Tambourines / Vanilla [double-single]

=== DVD ===
- Muddy Diamond Sessions
