= Kemuri =

Japanese-American ska punk band

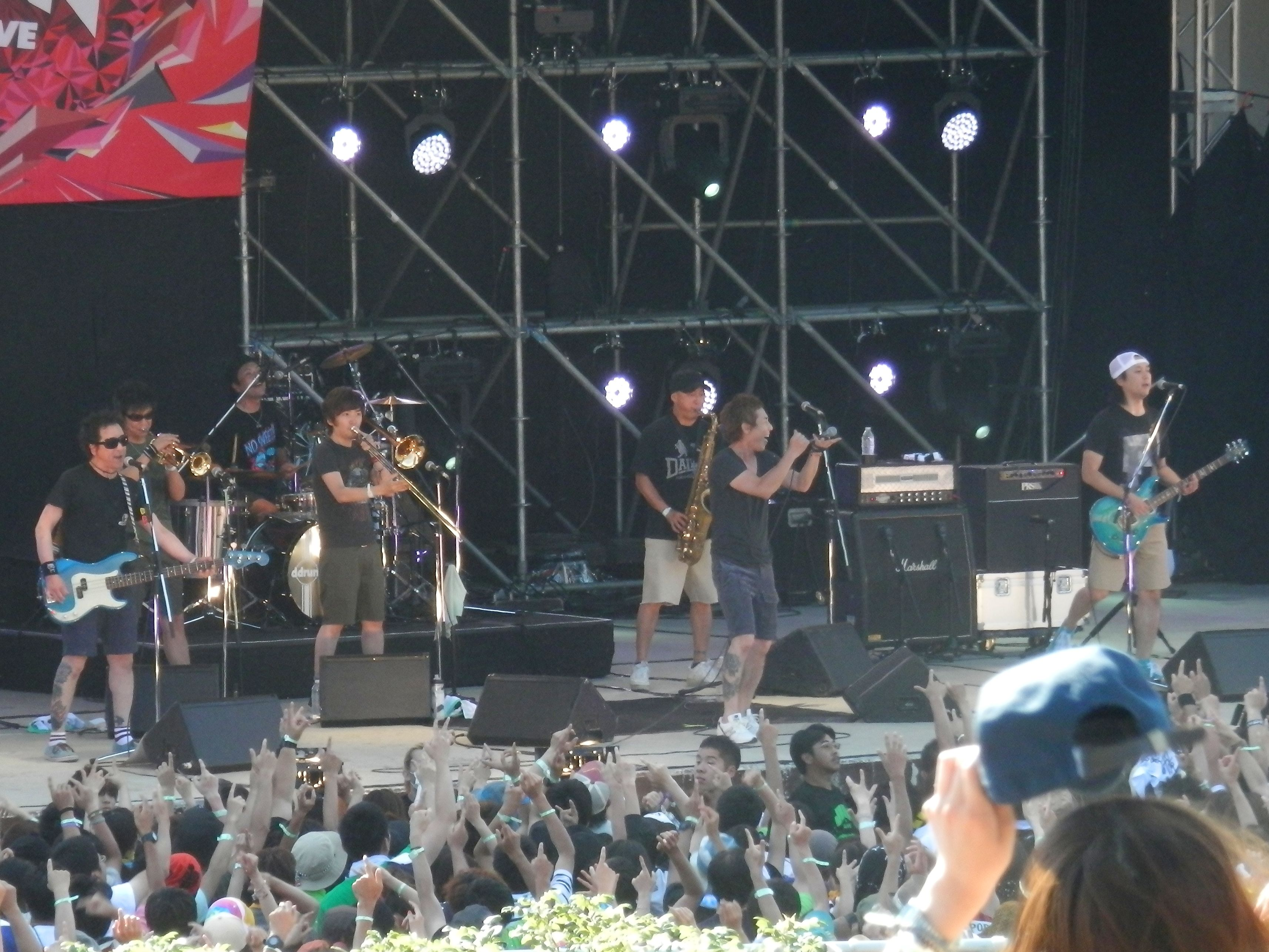

Background information
- Origin: Oxnard, California, US
- Genres: Ska punk
- Years active: 1995–2007, 2012-present
- Labels: Roadrunner Records, Fuldragon, Ska Punker, Island Records, Universal Music Japan, Avex Io, Cutting Edge, OneCircle, ramble, Zen Music, K.O.G.A Records, No Idea Records, Fueled by Ramen, Asian Man Records
- Members: Fumio Ito; Noriaki Tsuda; Shoji Hiraya; Ken Kobayashi; Yukihiko 'T' Tanaka; Mitsuhiro Kawamura; Hiroyuki Suka
- Past members: Masuo Arimatsu; Ryosuke Morimura; Hidenori Minami; Mike Park
- Website: https://kemuri-official.com/

Kemuri (Japanese for smoke) is a Japanese-American ska punk band formed in Oxnard, California in 1995. They have an upbeat sound with positive lyrics which they refer to as PMA (positive mental attitude). While the majority of their songs are in English, they also have some songs in Japanese. After their reformation in 2012, they released four more albums and continue to tour actively.

== Break up and reunion ==
On 12 December 2007, Kemuri posted a message on their website stating they would no longer play together as a band. They said they had done much more than they expected as a band and that this break up would be the most positive conclusion to their band (keeping in line with their PMA message). Their last show was on 9 December 2007, at the Zepp in Tokyo also their final show in Oxnard, California. In 2012, Kemuri made their reunion tour in Tokyo and in the U.S. The first new album after the reunion, "All for This!," was released on 6 June 2013. In 2012, the band re-formed again and continues to perform in all over Asia, Japan, Europe and in the United States and in other countries worldwide.

== Band members ==
- Fumio Ito (伊藤ふみお), Vocals
- Noriaki Tsuda (津田紀昭), Bass
- Yukihiko 'T' Tanaka (田中‘T’幸彦), Guitar
- Shoji Hiraya (平谷庄至), Drums
- Ken Kobayashi (コバヤシケン), Saxophone
- Mitsuhiro Kawamura (河村光博), Trumpet
- Hiroyuki Suka (須賀裕之), Trombone

=== Former members ===
- Masuo Arimatsu (有松益男), drums 1995–1996
- Mike Park, tenor saxophone, 1995 - 1997; left after Kemuri's first album, Little Playmate.
- Ryosuke Morimura (Deceased) - Trumpet
- Hidenori Minami - Guitar

== Discography ==
- Little Playmate (1997)
- 77 Days (1998)
- Senka-Senrui (2000)
- Emotivation (2001)
- Circles (2004)
- Wating for the Rain (2005)
- Principle (2005)
- Our PMA (2007)
- All for This! (2013)
- Rampant (2014)
- F (2015)
- FREEDOMOSH (2017)
- Ko-Ou-Doku-Mai (2018)
- Solidarity (2020)
