= Rising Sun Rock Festival =

Rock music festival in Japan

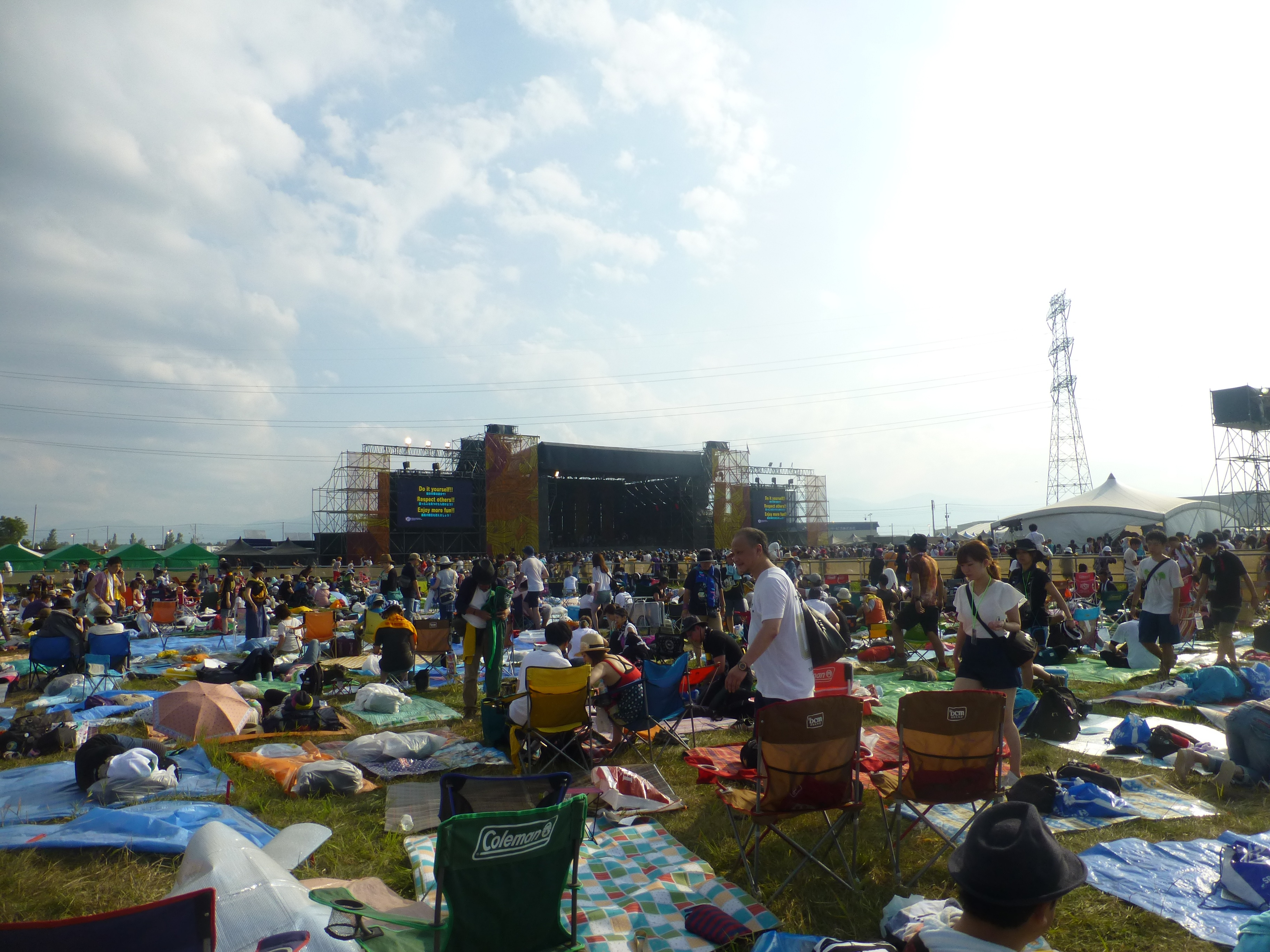
- Main stage, 2016
- Genre: Rock, indie, pop, electronic dance music, hip hop
- Dates: August (2 days + All night)
- Locations: Ishikari and Otaru, Hokkaido, Japan
- Years active: 1999 - present
- Attendance: 74,000 (2018, two days total)
- Organizer: WESS
- Website: Official site

Rising Sun Rock Festival is an annual rock festival held in Ishikari, Hokkaido, Japan. The two-day event is organized by WESS. It chiefly features Japanese rock and indie performers.

== Festival summary by year ==
No.	Year	Dates	Headliners	Attendance	note
1st	1999	August 21	Thee Michelle Gun Elephant; Sunny Day Service	26,500	
2nd	2000	August 19	Dengeki Network; Tamio Okuda	13,000	
3rd	2001	August 17–18	Spitz; Theatre Brook	24,000	
4th	2002	August 16–17	The High-Lows; Yosui Inoue; The Boom	69,000	
5th	2003	August 15–16	Tokyo Ska Paradise Orchestra; Chage and Aska; Ulfuls	65,000	
6th	2004	August 13–14	The High-Lows; The Mad Capsule Markets; Original Love	62,000	
7th	2005	August 19–20	Brahman; Fishmans; Kazuyoshi Saito	60,000	
8th	2006	August 18–19	Tokyo Ska Paradise Orchestra; Kazuya Yoshii; Kemuri	62,000	
9th	2007	August 17–18	Kemuri; Eikichi Yazawa; Keiichi Sokabe Band	70,000	
10th	2008	August 15–16	Ken Yokoyama; Mr. Children; Tokyo Ska Paradise Orchestra	80,000	
11th	2009	August 14–15	Elephant Kashimashi; Unicorn; The Pillows	65,000	
12th	2010	August 13–14	Scha Dara Parr; Tatsuro Yamashita; Asian Kung-Fu Generation	61,000	
13th	2011	August 12–13	Tomoyasu Hotei; The Cro-Magnons; Hanaregumi	47,000	
14th	2012	August 10–11	Yasuyuki Okamura; Superfly; Elephant Kashimashi	58,550	
15th	2013	August 16–17	Reichi Nakaido; Kazumasa Oda; Mongol800	57,255	
16th	2014	August 15–16	Denki Groove; Tokyo Ska Paradise Orchestra; Fishmans	60,000	
17th	2015	August 14–15	Asian Kung-Fu Generation; Anzen Chitai; 10-Feet	65,000	
18th	2016	August 12–13	Denki Groove; Chiharu Matsuyama; Brahman	67,000	
19th	2017	August 11–12	Rekishi; Toshinobu Kubota; Quruli	72,000	
20th	2018	August 10–11	Sakanaction; Tatsuro Yamashita; Tokyo Ska Paradise Orchestra	74,000	
21st	2019	August 16–17	Number Girl (cancelled); LiSA; Dragon Ash	37,000	Day 1 was cancelled due to a typhoon
22nd	2020	August 14–15			

== Performances ==
=== 1999 ===
The 1999 festival took place on 21 August 1999.

Line-up
Main Stage
- Denki Groove
- Number Girl
- The Mad Capsule Markets
- Zeppet Store
- The High-Lows
- Dragon Ash
- UA
- Sheena Ringo
- Thee Michelle Gun Elephant
- pre-school
- Blankey Jet City
- Guitar Wolf
- Supercar
- Bloodthirsty Butchers
- Sunny Day Service

=== 2000 ===
The 2000 festival took place on 19 August 2000.

Line-up
Main Stage	RSR Tent
Mongol800; Tokyo Ska Paradise Orchestra; Polysics; the pillows; DMBQ; Brahman; Eastern Youth; Dengeki Network; Aco; Ruffy Tuffy; Yura Yura Teikoku; Ajico; Husking Bee; Soul Flower Union; Okuda Tamio	Hiraoka Keiko; Go!Go!7188; Going Steady; wilberry; Cembalo; DJ Sasa; Tatsuyuki Hiyamuta & Atsushi Yanaka; Spoozys; Audio Active; Fantastic Plastic Machine; Yoshihiro Sawasaki; HEATIN'SYSTEM

=== 2001 ===
The 2001 festival took place from 17 to 18 August 2001.

Line-up
Stage	Day 1	Day 2
Sun Stage		Ska Ska Club; Number Girl; Kemuri; THE MODS; LÄ-PPISCH; Spitz; The High-Lows; UA; Eastern Youth; Thee Michelle Gun Elephant; SHERBETS; Chihiro Onitsuka; Boom Boom Satellites; Theatre Brook
Earth Tent	Penpals; smorgas; Zoobombs; Guitar Wolf; Sheena & The Rokkets; Seagull Screaming Kiss Her Kiss Her; Wrench; Losalios; Quruli	The Back Horn; MOGA THE ¥5; Dohatsuten; The 3peace; Potshot; Gontiti; Keison; Mayumi Kojima; Little Tempo; Loopa Night; Takkyu Ishino; DJ Tasaka; Toby; Kagami

=== 2002 ===
The 2002 festival took place from 16 to 17 August 2002.

Line-up
Stage	Day 1	Day 2
Sun Stage	Dragon Ash; KICK THE CAN CREW; SNAIL RAMP; YamaArashi; MONGOL800; The High-Lows	Okuda Tamio; BACK DROP BOMB; DRY&HEAVY; Tokyo Ska Paradise Orchestra; TOKYO No. 1 SOUL SET; Thee Michelle Gun Elephant; Yosui Inoue; Kiyoshiro Imawano & Akiko Yano; The Mad Capsule Markets; JUDE; GOING STEADY; EGO-WRAPPIN'; Yura Yura Teikoku; WRENCH; THE BOOM
Earth Tent	GaGaGa SP; SHAKA LABBITS; Mahha25; SPARKS GO GO; Hermann H.&The Pacemakers; GREAT3; RIZE; Kemuri	THE NEATBEATS; DEXIED THE EMONS; KING BROTHERS; In the Soup; Ellegarden; PEALOUT; Buffalo Daughter; MO'SOME TONEBENDER; Crazy Ken Band; What's Love?; THA BLUE HERB; LOVE JETS; ROVO; FOE
Red Star Field	babamania; 03; TOUCH-ME（Michiro Endo/Tatsuya Nakamura）; Tama; KICELL; Shing02; THE TRAVELLERS&DJ'S（for CAMPERS）	ROCKIN' ichiro AND BOOGIE WOOGIE SWING BOYS; Kazuyoshi Saito; Chitose Hajime; PE'Z; Yamagen; HERBERT; UA; HARRY; LOSALIOS; ROSSO
Moon Circus	rei harakami; Fantastic Plastic Machine; Sembello	LOOPA NIGHT; TAKKYU ISHINO; DJ TASAKA; TOBY; KAGAMI; YAMAOKA; HITOSHI; 7th gate; KO-TA

=== 2003 ===
The 2003 festival took place from 15 to 16 August 2003.

Line-up
Stage	Day 1	Day 2
Sun Stage	Kishidan; Ketsumeishi; Shikao Suga; GO!GO!7188; JUDE; Tokyo Ska Paradise Orchestra	Dohatsuten; KICK THE CAN CREW; Masayoshi Yamazaki; Kemuri; SUPERCAR; CHAGE and ASKA; The High-Lows; MONGOL800; BUMP OF CHICKEN; Spitz; SHEENA&THE ROKKETS; audio active; SOFT BALLET; Ulfuls
Earth Tent	STANCE PUNKS; ZARIGANI 5; nil; BAZRA; Taiyouzoku; GOING UNDER GROUND; THE MODS	175R; SOURCE; Bleach; the pillows; Kazuyoshi Saito; Miyuki Hatakeyama; Kirinji; Keiichi Sokabe; HEESEY WITH DUDES; Flower Companyz; Scoobie Do; Wakusei; Guitar Wolf
Red Star Field	Theatre Brook; Leyona; EGO-WRAPPIN'; DMBQ; bloodthirsty butchers; ZAZEN BOYS; SPECIAL SESSION for CAMPERS（Yosuke Yamashita、Tatsuya Nakamura etc）	Jaurim; BLIND HEADZ; Hanaregumi; ORIGINAL LOVE; Yoshitaka Minami; BAHO; Reiran; SAMURAI III（Tamio Okuda/Char/Masayoshi Yamazaki）; THE TRAVELLERS; Maki Carmen & Salamandra; ROCK'N'ROLL GYPSIES; Quruli
Moon Circus	Fantastic Plastic Machine; Atsushi Yanaka; Ken Ishii; TSUYOSHI; SUGIURUMN with Keiichi Sokabe; The SunPaulo	Skaymates; DETERMINATIONS; Little Tempo; copa salvo; Tsuyoshi Kawakami & His Moodmakers; LOOPA NIGHT; Takkyu Ishino; DJ TASAKA; TOBY; KAGAMI; SHIN NISHIMURA
Green Oasis	Japaharinet; TOKYO PINSALOCKS; Gash; FLOW; GATS TKB SHOW; CORE OF SOUL; BAKER SHOP BOOGIE; KWEEN（for CAMPERS）; Junji Inagawa（for CAMPERS）	saigenji; Kotaro Oshio; Hajimenikiyoshi; REAL BLOOD; OKI; LONDON NITE（Kensho Onuki etc）

=== 2004 ===
The 2004 festival took place from 13 to 14 August 2004.

Line-up
Stage	Day 1	Day 2
Sun Stage	Potshot; SHAKALABBITS; Yasuyuki Okamura; JUDE; Char; THE HIGH LOWS	Kemuri; Dragon Ash; HY; PE'Z; The Mad Capsule Markets; Chara; SAMURAI III（Tamio Okuda/Char/Masayoshi Yamazaki）; Tokyo Ska Paradise Orchestra; BUMP OF CHICKEN; Shibusashirazu Orchestra; Original Love
Earth Tent	ACIDMAN; THE BACK HORN; B-DASH; LOST IN TIME; ASIAN KUNG-FU GENERATION; ARB; MONGOL800（for CAMPERS）	Puffy AmiYumi; The Inazuma Sentai; Husking Bee; THE PRIVATES; The Genbaku Onanizu; eastern youth; ZIGGY; THE NEATBEATS+Kazuyuki Kuhara+Shinya Okuno; Sambomaster; Syrup16g; DOPING PANDA; Wakusei; NEW ROTE'KA
Red Star Field	Hanaregumi; BONNIE PINK; Clammbon; Yoshio Hayakawa・Msahide Sakuma（Ces Chiens） with Mito（Clammbon）; Polaris; Masayoshi Yamazaki; Roletta Secohan（for CAMPERS）; SPECIAL SESSION for CAMPERS Concept of BUCK JAM TONIC	Kazufumi Miyazawa; Shutoku Mukai Acoustic & Electric; Katteni-Shiyagare; Yura Yura Teikoku; UA; Losalios; Buffalo Daughter; ROVO; MO'SOME TONEBENDER; THA BLUE HERB
Moon Circus	bonobos; Kachimba 1551; Higegakudan; V∞REDOMS; MOONLIGHT GROOVE; DJ EMMA; TOWA TEI	smorgas; EL-MALO; The SunPaulo; Shibusashirazu Orchestra; BOOM BOOM SATELLITES; LOOPA NIGHT
Green Oasis	Jackson vibe; Bivattchee; Yakozen; SPARTA LOCALS; Group Tamashii; BLACK BOTTOM BRASS BAND; Comedy Club King（for CAMPERS）; Junji Inagawa（for CAMPERS）	Ayano Tsuji; CHABA; Akeboshi; Leyona; Takashi Hamazaki & MCU; LONDON NITE
Bohemian Garden	Hinoki-ya; Hikaru Tanimoto; Mura Furukawa（Furumura Toshihiko+Nozomi Furukawa）; FILM TIME「music clip」; FILM TIME「Colors of Life」	Bayefall; Armeria; hajime; citron(chiharu mk + Hazuki Kuwajima); Liquid 3; Toshihiko Furumura; Hikaru Tanimoto; FILM TIME「Colors of Life」

=== 2005 ===
The 2005 festival took place from 19 to 20 August 2005.

Line-up
Stage	Day 1	Day 2
Sun Stage	Tokyo Ska Paradise Orchestra; RIP SLYME; FIRE BALL with JUNGLE ROOTS; Losalios; BOOM BOOM SATELLITES; BRAHMAN	Orange Range; Kishidan; ELLEGARDEN; Tamio Okuda; Fishmans; The High-Lows; ROSSO; SHERBETS; Kiyoshiro Imawano & NICE MIDDLE with NEW BLUE DAY HORNS; Crazy Ken Band; ASIAN KUNG-FU GENERATION; Quruli; Kazuyoshi Saito
Earth Tent	The Predators; THE BAND HAS NO NAME; Remioromen; DOPING PANDA; Polysics; Denki Groove × Scha Dara Parr; Zeppet Store; Ku-Matsuri（for CAMPERS）; KREVA; Maboroshi; Kasai Warriors; SONOMI; CUEZERO; Alpha	10-FEET; NICOTINE; Fujifabric; Ging Nang Boyz; Rhymester; The Pees; Magokoro Brothers; SPARKS GO GO; THE MODS; GREAT ADVENTURE; ENDS; BEAT CRUSADERS; THE COLTS (CANCELLED)
Red Star Field	Reggae Disco Rockers; NATSUMEN; Reiran; YOUR SONG IS GOOD; DEXIED THE EMONS; Afrirampo; Theatre Brook; Dengeki Network（for CAMPERS）; Kemuri（for CAMPERS）	Akainu; HONESTY; TOKYO No. 1 SOUL SET; DATE COURSE PENTAGON ROYAL GARDEN; Strange Love Psychedelico（Love Psychedelico+Hirohisa Horie+Dr.StrangeLove）; Minako Yoshida&THE BAND; Brazilian Girls; EGO-WRAPPIN'; ONJO/Otomo Yoshihide's New Jazz Orchestra featuring Kahimi Karie; SOIL&"PIMP"SESSIONS; nbsa+×÷; Inushiki a.k.a. Dogggystyle、Keyco/cro-magnon、so-ill&P.I.M.P
Moon Circus	Shuya Okino（Kyoto Jazz Massive）; Kaoru Inoue（chari chari）; FLYING RHYTHMS（for CAMPERS）; DJ KENSEI（for CAMPERS）; DJ KRUSH（for CAMPERS）	HOUSE OF LIQUID; MOODMAN&DJ KENSEI; KARAFUTO a.k.a.FUMIYA TANAKA; rei harakami; MU; LOOPA NIGHT; TAKKYU ISHINO; DJ TASAKA; TOBY; KAGAMI; RYUKYUDISKO
Green Oasis	Dohatsuten; KING BROTHERS; HIGH VOLTAGE; detroit7; NANANINE; THE COLLECTORS; HEAT WAVE; Hiyamuta Tatsuyuki presents "Taboo"（for CAMPERS）; Hiyamuta Tatsuyuki; Kaori Kawamura; Kayo Sakata; Scoobie Do; SCREAM OF THE PRESIDENTS	Iyashi under the sky; DEPAPEPE; Takehiro Kunugi & Abyss of Time; Kotaro Oshio; Suguru Matsutani; GONTITI; Asa-Chang & Junray; Yuko Ando; Hitomitoi; the pillows; KOOLOGI; Yoko Utsumi & Yokoloco Band; bobin and the mantra; POMERANIANS; Katteni-Shiyagare
Black Hole	Comedy Club King Movie Theatre; Uchu Record・Koichiro Tomioka; Bananaman	Namaiki; Ken Mogi×Yasunari Suda; Lily Franky×Neko Hiroshi×Pierre Taki; Uchu Record・Koichiro Tomioka; Miyazawa Akio×Ohne Hitoshi×Elec Comic×Lastsongs; Akira Yukinko; Masako Yasumoto from Azumabashi Dance Crossing; Comedy Club King（Tetsuhiro Ikeda・Kensaku Kobayashi）; Bokudesu from Azumabashi Dance Crossing; Enlightenment; Devilrobots
Bohemian Garden	Flamenco Libre; QYB（Kazuyuki Kuhara+Kazuhide Yamaji+BERATREK×Toshiaki Toyoda）	Anam & Maki、Magnolia、Flamenco Libre

=== 2006 ===
The 2006 festival took place from 18 to 19 August 2006.

Line-up
Stage	Day 1	Day 2
Sun Stage	SAMURAI III（Tamio Okuda/Char/Masayoshi Yamazaki）; Quruli; HY; Zazen Boys; Tokyo Ska Paradise Orchestra	Mongol800; Ketsumeishi; Kome Kome Club; Yoshihiro Kai & ROLLING CIRCUS REVUE BAND; Kazuya Yoshii; The Cro-Magnons; EGO-WRAPPIN'; ULTRA BRAiN; STRAIGHTENER; Kemuri
Earth Tent	Shonan no Kaze; RIZE; YamaArashi; GO!GO!7188; Group Tamashii; Yura Yura Teikoku; DMBQ; THE HOMESICKS; Dohatsuten	Analogfish; Locofrank; AIR; ACIDMAN; Shinya Oe; Zi:LiE-YA; MO'SOME TONEBENDER; Guitar Wolf; Radio Caroline; BACK DROP BOMB; DOPING PANDA
Red Star Field	MAMALAID RAG; Caravan; ROCK'N'ROLL GYPSIES; PE'Z; FRICTION（RECK・Tatsuya Nakamura）; Buffalo Daughter	Magokoro Brothers; Tamio Okuda; Moonriders; Kenichi Asai; KODAMA & THE DUB STATION BAND; LIKKLE MAI; Zoobombs; SPECIAL SESSION
Moon Circus	KENJI TAKIMI（CRUE-L/LUGER E-GO）; SLY MONGOOSE; InK（TAKKYU ISHINO+HIROSHI KAWANABE）; DJ NORI; A Hundred Birds Orchestra; ROVO; DJ EMMA（NITELIST MUSIC）; SHINICHI OSAWA（MONDO GROSSO）	UA×Naruyoshi Kikuchi; Yukihiro Takahashi; rei harakami feat.Akiko Yano; LOOPA NIGHT
Green Oasis	BAZRA; Misako Odani Trio; Angela Aki; GANGA ZUMBA; soul of Donto flom EZO; RISING☆STAR; Haku; Harukaze; Sakanaction	Pokaskajan; riddim saunter; HiGE; Shigeki Hamabe & jam students; THC!!; THE NEATBEATS; sleepy.ab; MONO; LONDON NITE
Black Hole	Fumio Ito& Gen Ueda; SURF ROCK TRIP...again（Magnolia・Keison・Caravan）; BIG HORNS BEE; Gian（Teppei Inoue+The Mieda Takuya）; Yoko Utsumi & jam students; THE LONG SEASON REVUE	K-106; Ban Ban Bazar; The Blues Power with Hiroshi Kamayatsu; Shutoku Mukai Acoustic & Electric; Marcos Suzano; Leyona; Taiji All Stars
Bohemian Garden	Comedy Club King with ENLIGHTENMENT; ELECTRIC COMIC; KATHY with mooog yamamoto; No Nukes Party; Uchu Record	KATHY with mooog yamamoto; Comedy Club King with ENLIGHTENMENT; No Nukes Party; ELECTRIC COMIC; shing02×kakumakushaka; ENLIGHTENMENT with Tomoyuki Tanaka (Fantastic Plastic Machine)

=== 2007 ===
The 2007 festival took place from 17 to 18 August 2007.

Line-up
Stage	Day 1	Day 2
Sun Stage	Dragon Ash; BEAT CRUSADERS; Yosui Inoue; The Cro-Magnons; ELLEGARDEN; Kemuri	10-Feet; the pillows; ASIAN KUNG-FU GENERATION; Kenichi Asai; Eikichi Yazawa; TOKYO SKA PARADISE ORCHESTRA; BUMP OF CHICKEN; ACIDMAN; THA BLUE HERB; Cocco; Keiichi Sokabe Band
Earth Tent	Maximum the Hormone; LOST IN TIME; Kaela Kimura; 8otto; HAWAIIAN6; BUCK-TICK; THE RODEO CARBURETTOR; Scoobie Do; MONORAL	GRAPEVINE; ART-SCHOOL; Fujifabric; the band apart; HiGE; Straightener; FLYING KIDS; Elephant Kashimashi; Aobozu; Midori; SNAIL RAMP; DOES
Red Star Field	SAKEROCK; Hanaregumi; Kahimi Karie; Soul Flower Union; RSR SESSION for CAMPERS Tatsuya Nakamura and Heavy Friends	FRICTION（ЯECK・Tatsuya Nakamura）; Boom Boom Satellites; METALCHICKS; UA; BEGIN; Joe Yamanaka; Orquesta de la Luz; LÄ-PPISCH; Katteni-Shiyagare
Moon Circus	SPECIAL OTHERS; Dachambo; INO hidefumi; THE HELLO WORKS（Scha Dara Parr & MONGOOSE）; SOIL&"PIMP"SESSIONS; dj KENTARO; DJ KRUSH	THE CORNELIUS GROUP; V∞REDOMS; LOOPA NIGHT; TAKKYU ISHINO; DISCO TWINS （DJ TASAKA+KAGAMI）; TOBY; FUMIYA TANAKA; RYUKYUDISKO; DEVICEGIRLS
Green Oasis	Uri Nakayama; Hitomitoi; JOY HEIGHTS; Tokyo Ska Paradise Orchestra; RISING☆STAR; Kibako; spirit page; The Mayflowers	Standing Alone in a Palace; DUB AINU BAND; YOUR SONG IS GOOD; Shikao Suga; POPGROUP "KAIKOO"; DJ BAKU; envy; SHIRO THE GOODMAN feat.THINK TANK; GOTH-TRAD x MUROCHIN BLACK GANION; TURTLE *ISLAND RUMI; oak; DJ SENORINA; sleepy.ab
Bohemian Garden	Ayano Tsuji; Emerson Kitamura; Ezo Roudokukai; the SunPaulo	The Birthday; qyb; M.J.Q; Yoko Utsumi & Yokoloco Band; EZOIST; Emerson Kitamura; Theatre Brook

=== 2008 ===
The 2008 festival took place from 15 to 16 August 2008.

Line-up
Stage	Day 1	Day 2
Sun Stage	Ken Yokoyama; Denki Groove; Tokyo Jihen; the pillows; Remioromen; Quruli	Tokyo Ska Paradise Orchestra; Sunny Day Service; THE BACK HORN; Yura Yura Teikoku; ZAZEN BOYS; Sheena Ringo; Mr. Children; The Cro-Magnons; BEAT CRUSADERS; Mongol800; Dohatsuten
Earth Tent	Fumiya Fujii; BARBEE BOYS; JUN SKY WALKER(S); OGRE YOU ASSHOLE; COMEBACK MY DAUGHTERS; DOES; DOPING PANDA; bloodthirsty butchers; KENZI	SHAKALABBITS; ASPARAGUS; Sakanaction; Kuchiroro; te'; EL-MALO; Shonen Knife; Ging Nang Boyz; Ling Tosite Sigure; Stance Punks; GaGaGa SP
Red Star Field	Shang Shang Typhoon; Naruyoshi Kikuchi Dub; Keiichi Sokabe Rendezvous Band; Akiko Yano; Yuko Ando; Yosuke Yamashita New Quartet; TWIN TAIL	Rovo; LOSALIOS; Ego-Wrappin'; LOW IQ 01&MASTER LOW; SHERBETS; Yuji Ohno&Lupintic Five; TOKYO No. 1 SOUL SET; Double Famous; OVERGROUND ACOUSTIC UNDERGROUND
Moon Circus	DJ KRUSH; Tha Blue Herb; Scha Dara Parr; Shing02; Maboroshi; DJ NORI; TOWA TEI	BOOM BOOM SATELLITES; rei harakami; pupa; Audio Active; V∞REDOMS; LOOPA NIGHT; TAKKYU ISHINO; DJ TASAKA; TOBY; KAGAMI; FUMIYA TANAKA; DEVICEGIRLS
Green Oasis	Midori; Misako Odani; THE BACILLUS BRAINS; lego big morl; BUGY CRAXONE; Flower Companyz; RISING☆STAR; The Kuwagatrs; REVOLVER AHOSTAR; Capsules	Seikou Ito & POMERANIANS; DJ BAKU（Hybrid Audio Band Set）; Junpei Shiina; pe'zmoku; Crazy Ken Band; THE BEACHES; Vola and the Oriental Machine; Chitose Hajime; Gontiti; Anam & Maki; Kotaro Oshio
Bohemian Garden	Yoko Utsumi & Yokoloco Band; Ban Ban Bazar; Shigekazu Aida; Port of Notes; Caravan; Emerson Kitamura; Suzuki Kenji a.k.a. Kenji Jammer; YAOAO（Dachambo）feat.Taiji Sato	EZOIST; The Birthday; Taiji Sato; OKI DUB AINU BAND feat. MAREWREW; Katteni-Shiyagare; Emerson Kitamura
Crystal Palace	Hiroshi Kamayatsu&Takashi Numazawa; Buffalo Daughter; Signals; Club King Visual Show	Sheena & The Rokkets; Zi:LiE-YA; COOL WISE MEN with EDDIE"TAN TAN"THORNTON; Sawao Yamanaka; HARRY; GAN-BAN NIGHT; OMOKAGE LUCKY HOLE; CAPTAIN FUNK; sugiurumn; THE SAMOS MOBILE SET; DEXPISTOLS; TAKAYUKI SERINO; pre-school

=== 2009 ===
Rising Sun Rock Festival in EZO 2009 Started on August 14 at 15:00 JST (UTC +9), and Ended on August 16 05:40 JST (UTC +9).

Line-up
Stage	Day 1	Day 2
Sun Stage	Ken Yokoyama; Polysics; STRAIGHTENER; Koji Kikkawa; Elephant Kashimashi	BEAT CRUSADERS; Dragon Ash; BEGIN; Unicorn; Shibusashirazu Orchestra; The Birthday; Kenichi Asai; Katteni-Shiyagare; the pillows
Earth Tent	HIGE; RIZE; REDEMPTION 97 (ex. KEMURI ex. POTSHOT); 9mm Parabellum Bullet; Guitar Wolf; 10-FEET; Maximum the Hormone (CANCELLED)	The50Kaitenz; Nothing's Carved in Stone; YOUR SONG IS GOOD; Dohatsuten; Midori; LOUDNESS; Flower Travellin' Band; eastern youth; 8otto; detroit7
Red Star Field	SPECIAL OTHERS; THE BOOM; bonobos; Hanaregumi; LITTLE TEMPO; OKI DUB AINU BAND	Sekaiichi; Sakerock; SION & The Cat Scratch Combo; Mitsuyoshi Azuma & The Swinging Boppers with Kiyoshi Matsutakeya; Soil & "Pimp" Sessions; Chara; quasimode; KICELL
Moon Circus	GOMA & The Jungle Rhythm Section; THE HEAVYMANNERS; cro-magnon; Yoshinori Sunahara; DAISHI DANCE (DJ + Live Session: Mai / GOCOO / VJ WAKADEN); capsule	WRENCH; mi-gu; sakanaction; THE SUNPAOLO; LOOPA NIGHT; agraph (live); HIROSHI KAWANABE; KAGAMI; TAKKYU ISHINO; DJ TASAKA; FUMIYA TANAKA; TOBY; EXTEND SESSION
Green Oasis	UNCHAIN; Discharming man; toe; FRONTIER BACKYARD; MAGOKORO BROTHERS; Shikao Suga; RISING STAR; Yoshiaki Sato; the takedagumi; matildamarch	Ohashi Trio; ROCK'A'TRENCH; KYOKO KOIZUMI; FLYING KIDS; THE BAWDIES; Pay Money to My Pain; MO'SOME TONEBENDER; BIGMAMA; LOST IN TIME; te'; RAZORS EDGE; MASS OF THE FERMENTING DREGS
Bohemian Garden	YUKAWA SHIONE; Pascals; Syohei Muto (KATTENI-SHIYAGARE) with Koji Ueno (the HIATUS / Radio Caroline); NAKAIDO "CHAMBO" REICHI with KATAYAMA HIROAKI; Junji Inagawa	→Pia-no-jaC←; Emerson Kitamura; Okuda Tamio hitori-pokkuru; North Shore Breezing; Leyona; Keison; 東田トモヒロ; Dachambo; TOKYO SKA PARADISE ORCHESTRA; SHOULD I STAY OR EZO?; BEAT CRUSADERS; SCOOBIE DO; SEKAIICHI; Dohatsuten; THE BEACHES; bloodthirsty butchers; WRENCH; ...and many more band; THE BEACHES
Crystal Palace	Hinode Syokudo; usotsuki barbie; blues.the-butcher-590213 with Leyona; LOSALIOS feat. Red Soul	CLUBKING ART SCHOOL; noanowa; SCOOBIE DO; GOOD LUCK HEIWA; ENTITY OF RUDE

=== 2010 ===
Rising Sun Rock Festival 2010 in EZO's website was launched on January 6, 2010, the top three acts from the RISING STAR section of the festival from 2006, 2007, 2008, and 2009 will all take place in a voting contest between March 15 and May 7, with the results to be in by mid-June. The winner will perform on the Green Oasis stage. Requests for bands are currently open, and the English mirror site will be launched on March 1, 2010. A Twitter page has been launched for the event as well.

Line-up
Stage	Day 1	Day 2
Sun Stage	Scha Dara Parr; Seikima-II; Grapevine; Kreva; dustbox	Asian Kung-Fu Generation; 9mm Parabellum Bullet; Boom Boom Satellites; The Hiatus; Beat Crusaders; Kazuyoshi Saito; Tatsuro Yamashita; Elephant Kashimashi; Eikichi Yazawa
Earth Tent	Bloodthirsty Butchers; the pillows; Maximum the Hormone; Mass of the Fermenting Dregs; Chatmonchy; Okuda Tamio; AA=	Does; The Back Horn; Sōtaisei Riron; Wagdug Futuristic Unity; Nanba Akihiro; Keiichi Sokabe Band; LÄ-PPISCH; The Predators; the telephones; Group Tamashii
Red Star Field	Yuko Ando; Char; Love Psychedelico; Kan; Osaka Monaurail; Theatre Brook	Ego-Wrappin' and The Gossip of Jaxx; Tha Blue Herb; UA; Original Love; Pe'z; Zazen Boys; Tokyo No. 1 Soul Set
Moon Circus	Buffalo Daughter; Rovo; Ogre You Asshole; Shugo Tokumaru; House of Liquid Eye / DJ Nobu	Yanokami; Plastics; pupa; De De Mouse; Loopa Night 10th Anniversary; Takkyu Ishino; Hiroshi Kawanabe; Toby Live DJ Tasaka; Shin Nishimura; Devicegirls (VJ)
Green Oasis	Puffy AmiYumi; Katajama Breakers & Rock and Roll Party; Ryujin Kiyoshi; andymori; Cocco; Rising Star; Hanuman; Cosmic Stew; The Camp	Catsuomaticdeath; noodles; detroit7; school food punishment; Hinode Sokudó; Moonriders; Ovall; Hoff Dylan; Curly Giraffe; D.W. Nicols
Bohemian Garden	Shutoku Mukai Acoustic & Electric; Overground Acoustic Underground; Tenniscoats; Kuricorder Quartet; Oohata Harada Naga Dumi	Scoobie Do; Ezoist; Soul Flower Union; Ban Ban Bazar; tobaccojuice; Tsuyoshi Kawakami to Kare no Mood Makers; Gen Hoshino; Black Bottom Brass Band; kiyoshi Matsutakeya & Emerson Kitamura
Crystal Palace	Susumu Osada presents "Bar Palmaso"; Kinoco Hotel; The Takeda-gumi; One Ok Rock; The Rising Sun Blues; The Pees; The Genbaku Onanizu; M.J.Q.	New Rote'ka; Lunkhead; avengers in sci-fi; Club King Talk Show; Hifana; Tavito Nanao; Junpei Shiina & The Soul Force; suzumoku; OreSkaBand

=== 2011 ===
The 2011 festival took place from 12 to 13 August 2011.

Line-up
Stage	Day 1	Day 2
Sun Stage	Denki Groove; HIGE; B.B.Queens; Quruli; Tomoyasu Hotei	Kishidan; 10-FEET; Tokyo Ska Paradise Orchestra; The Cro-Magnons; Sakanaction; Yonin No SAMURAI（Char/Tamio Okuda/Masayoshi Yamazaki/Kazuyoshi Saito）; Hanaregumi
Earth Tent	ONE OK ROCK; Base Ball Bear; Dohatsuten; the pillows; Polysics; the telephones; Straightener	dustbox; Nothing's Carved in Stone; Your Song Is Good; Mongol800; BIGMAMA; THE MODS; LOW IQ 01&MASTER LOW; androp; Scoobie Do
Red Star Field	Caravan; SPECIAL OTHERS; So many tears; the band apart; Kazuyoshi Saito	OKAMOTO'S; TAIJI at THE BONNET; DOES; The Birthday; SHERBETS; LITTLE CREATURES; EOR
Moon Circus	LUVRAW & BTB; Zainichi Funk; Cypress Ueno To Robert Yoshino; DJ KRUSH meets Kazumi Kodama & Sibitt (Origami); Dub Master X	Nisennenmondai; KIMONOS; group inou; Y.Sunahara; TONE PARK; VJ : DEVICEGIRLS; DJ : TAKAAKI ITOH; SHIN NISHIMRA; TAKKYU ISHINO; KEN ISHII; DJ TASAKA
Green Oasis	Miss Monday; back number; Abrarz; Fried Pride; Shinsei Kamattechan; RISING★STAR; Riku Nakanishi Trio; Tokyo Chaos City; tricot	Tsuru; →Pia-no-jaC←; Yu Takahashi; KODOMO BAND; killing Boy; MOWMOW LULU GYABAN; H ZETT M
Bohemian Garden	Predawn; Fuyumi Abe; Maiko Kishi; FUNKIST; Rekishi; Junji Inagawa	EmeLeyo（Emerson Kitamura+Leyona）; HUMBERT HUMBERT; AOEQ（Hiroshi Fujiwara+YO-KING）; Arakoi; Hiroshi Yamaguchi/Sakana Hosomi（HEATWAVE）; Kazutoki Umezu KIKI BAND; Shutoku Mukai+Tavito Nanao; Dachambo; Indies Denryoku
Crystal Palace	Queen Bee; Akira Ishige Special Band Set; BUGY CRAXONE; plenty; Ashigaru Youth; Susumu Osada presents "bar MALPASO"; Ani Taki Jamboree '11; MC:ANI（Scha Dara Parr）; Pierre Taki（Denki Groove）; Michiko Shimizu; Tomoe Shinohara; AFRA	Curea; Odotte Bakari No Kuni; Gekitetsu; oh sunshine; Laika Came Back; ent; 3G（Reichi Nakaido・Shuichi Murakami・Ken Yoshida）; RSR×Naozumi Masuko（Dohatsuten）Presents 「ZOOMY Produce」; Sawao Yamanaka; THE BLONDIE PLASTIC WAGON; Jake stone garage; The Komesoudou; CRYSTAL PALACE MIDNIGHT THEATER "kocorono"

=== 2012 ===
The 2012 festival took place from 10 to 11 August 2012.

Line-up
Stage	Day 1	Day 2
Sun Stage	Fujifabric; Perfume; RADWIMPS; Kazuyoshi Saito; Yasuyuki Okamura	Princess Princess; The Bawdies; ASIAN KUNG-FU GENERATION; Superfly; Maximum the Hormone; BRAHMAN; ONE OK ROCK; Elephant Kashimashi
Earth Tent	Champagne; coldrain; MIYAVI; BIGMAMA; Chatmonchy; Tokyo Ska Paradise Orchestra; Denki Groove	the GazettE; THE BACK HORN; The50kaitenz; THE PREDATORS; 9mm Parabellum Bullet; N,shukugawaboys; andymori; UNISON SQUARE GARDEN; POLYSICS
Red Star Field	HUMBERT HUMBERT×COOL WISE MAN; Shikao Suga; Akiko Yano×Hiromi Uehara; indigo jam unit; THE TRAVELLERS with NAOYUKI FUJII; THE GOLDEN WET FINGERS（Yusuke Chiba・Akinobu Imai・Tatsuya Nakamura）	Mitsuyoshi Azuma & The Swinging Boppers; Angela Aki; bonobos; Scoobie Do; SPECIAL OTHERS; the day; ROVO; LOSALIOS; Tatsuya Nakamura and Heavy Friends
Bohemian Garden	Curly Giraffe; Takashi Hamazaki; Permanents（Kazumasa Tanaka & Isao Takano from GRAPEVINE）; PHONO TONES; Dohatsuten RSR SP; hatsukoinoarashi; Rekishi	Emerson Kitamura; Yuichi Ohata; Ichiko Aoba; Lonesome Strings and Mari Nakamura; Kohei Dojima × A.C.E.; Masashi Yamada（THE BACK HORN）; Kazuhiro Momo; Shohei Yamaki; Leyona; Keiichi Sokabe Band; Shutoku Mukai Acoustic & Electric & outside yoshino（from eastern youth）
Rainbow Shangri-La	BAND A（RISING STAR）; TOKYO No. 1 SOUL SET; GREAT3; te'; LAMA; GOMA & The Jungle Rhythm Section; THA BLUE HERB	deepNow（RISING STAR）; FRYING DUTCHMAN; LITE; ART-SCHOOL; Fishmans; Toru Hidaka With Fed Music; TONE PARK; agraph; SHIN NISHIMURA; Let It a.k.a DJ 44; TAKKYU ISHINO; A.MOCHI; DJ TASAKA; DEVICEGIRLS
def garage	Gekko Green; The Komesoudou; Yoko Yazawa; Sasaki Hendrix; Negoto; HEY-SMITH; a flood of circle; KING BROTHERS; KINOCO HOTEL	CreepHyp; Dr.DOWNER; KEYTALK; Arukara; The SALOVERS; Heavenstamp; Mariko Goto; THE BOHEMIANS; 88Kasyo Junrei; THE RiCECOOKERS; MO'SOME TONEBENDER; The Pees

=== 2013 ===
The 2013 festival took place from 16 to 17 August 2013.

Line-up
Stage	Day 1	Day 2
Sun Stage	Reichi Nakaido Friday Night Session; 10-FEET; the HIATUS; Dohatsuten RSR Ishikari nabe Special	Mongol800; SCOOBIE DO; Quruli; Maximum the Hormone; Kazumasa Oda; Tokyo Ska Paradise Orchestra; MISIA; KEMURI
Earth Tent	RIZE; DOES; Base Ball Bear; SiM; the pillows; Group Tamashii; CreepHyp	the telephones; locofrank; Gokumontō Ikka; The Birthday; UNISON SQUARE GARDEN; Magokoro Brothers; Sambomaster; Straightener; Arukara; back number
Red Star Field	Sanfujins (Tamio Okuda, Shigeru Kishida, Daichi Ito); EGO-WRAPPIN' AND THE GOSSIP OF JAXX; Nothing's Carved in Stone; Ohashi Trio; Tamio Okuda; Yuko Ando; OVERGROUND ACOUSTIC UNDERGROUND	THE GOLDEN WET FINGERS; ZAZEN BOYS; Char; Hanaregumi; Haruomi Hosono; YOUR SONG IS GOOD; Rekishi; UGUISS feat. MISATO
Bohemian Garden	Junji Inagawa; Indies Denryoku; Permanents (Kazumasa Tanaka & Isao Takano from GRAPEVINE); Kanjuku Trio (Chu Kosaka, Shigeru Suzuki, Tokuo Nakano); Odoro Matilda; Yuta Saito solo×solo; EIJI SUZUKI (Dachambo)	Theatre Brook; cero; KICELL; CHABO & MIYA POETRY READING; Ban Ban Bazar; Masafumi Gotoh (ASIAN KUNG-FU GENERATION); Ai Iwasaki; Strange Reitaro; CHARAN-PO-RANTAN; Gontiti; Kazutoki Umezu KIKI BAND; Emerson Kitamura
Rainbow Shangri-La	Mountain Mocha Kilimanjaro; KINGDOM☆AFROCKS; →Pia-no-jaC←; Chara × Yusuke Kobayashi (THE NOVEMBERS) × KenKen (RIZE); Kazufumi Miyazawa & TRICERATOPS; amazarashi	group inou; LITE; Hermann H. & The Pacemakers; plenty; SIRO-A; TONE PARK; DEVICEGIRLS (VJ); SUGIURUMN; KEN ISHII; TAKKYU ISHINO; Yoshinori Sunahara; agraph
def garage	THE COLLECTORS; ZEPPET STORE; SKA SKA CLUB; tricot; Bo Ningen; FUZZY CONTROL; RISING★STAR; Parade Parade	Guitar Wolf; Soul Flower Union; GOING UNDER GROUND; The Flickers; NUBO; SuiseiNoboAz; 0.8Syooogeki; Kaisoku Tokyo; Haruka to Miyuki; Jake stone garage; RISING★STAR; FOLKS

=== 2014 ===
The 2014 festival took place from 15 to 16 August 2014.

Line-up
Stage	Day 1	Day 2
Sun Stage	Denki Groove; Ketsumeishi; UNICORN; Rekishi	Fishmans; Sakanaction; Dragon Ash; ONE OK ROCK; Tokyo Ska Paradise Orchestra; 9mm Parabellum Bullet; Kishidan; Elephant Kashimashi; Bakudan Johnny
Earth Tent	FRIDAY NIGHT SESSION - ROCK 'N' ROLL CIRCUS; The BONEZ; Flower Companyz; Kaela Kimura; AA=; Crossfaith	Arukara; ROTTENGRAFFTY; NAMBA69; Kyuso Nekokami; the pillows; OKAMOTO'S; GRAPEVINE; Kiyosaku Uezu & The BK Sounds!!; Gesu no Kiwami Otome
Red Star Field	SOIL&"PIMP"SESSIONS; The Birthday; a flood of circle; Straightener; Carnation LOVES Chisato Moritaka; Ichiko Aoba with Keigo Oyamada & U-zhaan	PSYCHEDELIC FOUNDATION (GOMA, SPEEDER-X); Tatsuro Yamashita; UA; Yukadan; BEGIN; Sanfujins; SPECIAL OTHERS; Ann Sally
Red Star Cafe	TAKUMA (10-Feet); Tohoku Live House Daisakusen; Atsushi Horie (Straightener); Shinobu Watanabe (ASPARAGUS); Pokaskajan; DJ Misosiru & MC Gohan; Syohei Muto with Koji Ueno; Aki Suzuki with Yu Suzuki	Tohoku Live House Daisakusen; Kenji Furuya; Yuko Ando; Tjiros; Taketo Oe; Hiroshi Fujiwara×Ino Hidefumi×Hama Okamoto; TarO&JirO; Sasaki Hendrix
Bohemian Garden	Theatre Brook; Leyona; Caravan; Kataomoi; Kumoyuki (Yuichi Ohata & Akiko Fukuoka from Chatmonchy); Miyuki Hatakeyama; D.W. Nicols	Flower Companyz (acoustic set); Yoko Utsumi & Yokoloco Band; Life Is Groove (KenKen×Hiroshi Kamayatsu×Ryunosuke Yamagishi feat. Mari Kaneko); Gotch; Shonen Yoshida × Udai Shika × Ryota Ueda; ABEDON; Emerson Kitamura; MY LIFE IS MY MESSAGE; Kazumasa Tanaka (GRAPEVINE); Caravan; Hiroshi Yamaguchi (HEATWAVE); Reichi Nakaido; IN THE MIDNIGHT HOURS; Fuyumi Abe; Taiji Sato (Theatre Brook); Keiichi Sokabe; Soichiro Yamauchi (Fujifabric)
Rainbow Shangri-La	BOOM BOOM SATELLITES; salyu×salyu; →Pia-no-jaC←×DAISHI DANCE; Scha Dara Parr; Koji Nakamura	OOIOO; sleepy.ab; avengers in sci-fi; Predawn; Dengeki Network; TONE PARK; Takkyu Ishino; Yoshinori Sunahara; SUGIURUMN; A.Mochi; agraph; DEVICEGIRLS
def garage	Czecho No Republic; HITORIE; THE PRIVATES; Sheena & The Rokkets; KNOCK OUT MONKEY; SAKANAMON; Passepied; SHISHAMO; RISING★STAR; Otonoe	Oboreta Ebi no Kenshihoukokusho; OLD; The fin.; FOLKS; Frederic; eastern youth; HUSKING BEE; Dendai; Kuso Iinkai; TESLA doesn't know how to cry.; Dramatic Alaska; Kuroki Nagisa; The Challenge; RISING★STAR; fula

=== 2015 ===
The 2015 festival took place from 14 to 15 August 2015.

Line-up
Stage	Day 1	Day 2
Sun Stage	Asian Kung-Fu Generation; MAN WITH A MISSION; ABEDON+OT (from Unicorn); Fear, and Loathing in Las Vegas; Kana-Boon	10-Feet; back number; Tamio Okuda (Guest： Perfume, Shigeru Matsuzaki, Tortoise Matsumoto); Perfume; Anzen Chitai; Rekishi & Kazumi Nikaido; RIZE; Alexandros; CreepHyp
Earth Tent	REBECCA Electronic Session (feat. NOKKO & AKIO DOBASHI); KEYTALK; androp; Monoeyes; WHITE ASH; BIGMAMA	Kenji "KJ" Furuya; Ging Nang Boyz; FULLARMOR; Group Tamashii; Nothing's Carved in Stone; Seikima-II; LOUDNESS; N,shukugawaboys; Kyuso Nekokami
Red Star Field	FRIDAY NIGHT SESSION "SCOOBIE DO & FRIDAY NIGHT FEVERS"; the day; Motoharu Sano & THE COYOTE BAND; Hanaregumi; PE'Z; Sunny Day Service	a flood of circle; The Back Horn; TOKYO SKA PARADISE ORCHESTRA; The Cro-Magnons; THE BAWDIES; Dohatsuten; Clammbon; G-FREAK FACTORY; Ishikari Hanakawa Minami Junior High School Brass Band
Red Star Cafe	Kitai Hazurenimo Hodo GIRL (from tricot); Takuro Sugawara & Kazuhiko Nakamura (9mm Parabellum Bullet)	DARUMA brothers; sugar me with Hirohisa Horie; Hiroshi Fujiwara × INO hidefumi; ACO; Koki Ito with SPYCE
Bohemian Garden	Theatre Brook with SOIL&"PIMP"SESSIONS; ROTH BART BARON; Yuko Ando; Mashimaro; Hirohisa Horie Presents "Lounge Bohemia"; Kazumi Nikaido	IN THE MIDNIGHT HOURS "The Blues Is Alright"; MY LIFE IS MY MESSAGE; Sing! Sing! Scream! Yoko Utsumi will survive!; Seitaro Kuroda × Tatsuya Nakamura; Jin Oki con Kazumi Watanabe; Yoshie Nakano; SCOOBIE DO; Moriwaikiteiru; Emerson Kitamura
Rainbow Shangri-La	Kirinji; JiLL-Decoy association; envy; LITE; the telephones; Kenshi Yonezu	The SKA FLAMES; Fujifabric; cero; plenty; miwa; TONE PARK; TAKKYU ISHINO; TOWA TEI; Hiroshi Kawanabe; SUGIURUMN; agraph; DEVICEGIRLS
def garage	Yoru no Honki Dance; THE COLLECTORS; PHONO TONES; Wednesday Campanella; THE BLACK COMET CLUB BAND; Akaiko-en; Drop's; RISING★STAR; Goodbye Fujiyama	tricot; Uchikubi Gokumon Doukoukai; Saishu Shojo Hikasa; Mrs. Green Apple; WEAVER; Mari Natsuki GIBIER du MARIE; ROCK'N'ROLL GYPSIES; UNCHAIN; 04 Limited Sazabys; Frederic; PIGGY BANKS; BUGY CRAXONE; RISING★STAR; beat sunset

=== 2016 ===
The 2016 festival took place from 12 to 13 August 2016.

Line-up
Stage	Day 1	Day 2
Sun Stage	Denki Groove; Kyuso Nekokami; BABYMETAL; One Ok Rock	Brahman; SiM; Gesu no Kiwami Otome; Naozumi Masuko（Dohatsuten） ～Yorinuki ROOTS66 in EZO～; Chiharu Matsuyama; Tokyo Ska Paradise Orchestra; Shonan no Kaze; UNISON SQUARE GARDEN
Earth Tent	KEMURI （for CAMPERS）; Sambomaster; HEY-SMITH; Cocco; Base Ball Bear; Mrs. Green Apple	9mm Parabellum Bullet; Arukara; 04 Limited Sazabys; ROTTENGRAFFTY; the pillows; SHISHAMO; Passepied; Wagakki Band
Red Star Field	Tomoyasu Hotei （for CAMPERS）; Yasuyuki Okamura; Elephant Kashimashi; Hanaregumi; Suchmos; Indigo la End	THA BLUE HERB; GRAPEVINE; UA; MANNISH BOYS; RIP SLYME; Maki Ohguro; Wednesday Campanella
Red Star Cafe	mocche nagai; Miho Nakano （Drop's）	NakamuraEmi; MOROHA; Yota Towatari （Morning For CAMPERS）
Bohemian Garden	FRIDAY NIGHT SESSION （for CAMPERS）; Magokoro Brothers Ishikari Folk Village～; OKI DUB AINU BAND; HEATWAVE; LIFE IS GROOVE; Strange Reitaro; bird; Leyona meets Miton	Caravan; IN THE MIDNIGHT HOURS "The Blues Is Alright"; MY LIFE IS MY MESSAGE; Mashimaro; Takao Tajima; HICKSVILLE; Shin Rizumu; Emerson Kitamura
Rainbow Shangri-La	SPECIAL OTHERS; ROVO × Koji Nakamura; PETROLZ; HUMBERT HUMBERT; Aki Yashiro; Puffy AmiYumi	TONE PARK; TAKKYU ISHINO; Ken Ishii; SUGIURUMN; agraph; MASARU; DEVICEGIRLS; Scha Dara Parr; cero （guest： VIDEOTAPEMUSIC）; THE COLLECTORS; Shikao Suga; Seiko Oomori
def garage	Sakura Fujiwara （for CAMPERS）; Scenarioart; TRICERATOPS; SA; BRADIO; ART-SCHOOL; Owarikara; The Challenge; SHE'S; RISING★STAR; The KAVE	su-xing-cyu; Yogee New Waves; The fin.; Ykiki Beat; My Hair is Bad; Bed In; The Inazuma Sentai; Ningen Isu; Kinniku Shojo Tai; Charisma.com; MONOBRIGHT; THE BEAT GARDEN; Nagisa Kuroki; RISING★STAR; The Floor

=== 2017 ===
The 2017 festival took place from 11 to 12 August 2017.

Line-up
Stage	Day 1	Day 2
Sun Stage	Rekisi; Uverworld; B'z; 10-Feet	Quruli; RIZE; Maximum the Hormone; Alexandros; Toshinobu Kubota; back number; Wanima; Shishamo
Earth Tent	Uchikubi Gokumon Doukoukai (for Campers); Nothing's Carved in Stone; The Oral Cigarettes; SCANDAL; Queen Bee; LiSA	Mongol800; My Hair is Bad; TK from Ling Tosite Sigure / PANDAS; Oldcodex; Monoeyes; Super Beaver; go!go!vanillas; Blue Encount; Frederic
Red Star Field	Friday Night Session: Ska Is the Paradise (for Campers); Chara; The Back Horn; Straightener; H Zettrio; Charan-po-rantan	Ging Nang Boyz; Suchmos; Cornelius; Kazuyoshi Saito; Unicorn; never young beach; Scoobie Do
Red Star Cafe	Saucy Dog; Eisukeichi Takeda (The Takeda-gumi)	Ozaki Szekaikan (CreepHyp); ReN; Johnsons Motorcar
Bohemian Garden	Junji Inagawa (for Campers); Song for Hiroshi Kamayatsu Life Is Groove (for Campers); Midnight Bankrobbers; Katteni-Shiyagare; Gotch & The Good New Times; Chatmonchy; Rei × Emi Nakamura; Aoi Teshima	ROTH BART BARON; In the Midnight Hours; My Life Is My Message; Yu Sakai feat. Miho Fukuhara Solar Jam; Overground Acoustic Underground; Ryosuke Nagaoka (Petrolz); John John Festival; Hasiken Trio; Emerson Kitamura
Rainbow Shangri-La	Creepy Nuts (R-ShḶitei+DJ Matsunaga) (for Campers); Losalios; Yoru no Honki Dance; The Beatniks (Yukihiro Takahashi+Keiichi Suzuki); G-Freak Factory; Michiko Shimizu	SONIXTATION; Licaxxx; Takkyu Ishino; Shinichi Osawa; Masaru; agraph; D.A.N.; Oukuramirai; Devicegirls (VJ); Awesome City Club; Boku no Lyric no Bōyomi; Nulbarich; F-Blood; Fujifabric; sumika
def garage	Taiiku Okazaki; Sanabagun; Ame no Parade; Negoto; Knock Out Monkey; Hysteric Panic; Vickeblanka; Cocoroauction; Rising Star; Roman kakumei	the peggies; Bazra; Moroha; SLANG; Not Wonk; Kinoko Teikoku; Tensai Band; Mari Natsuki; Eastern Youth; Zazen Boys; 175R; Kaori Kishitani; Band-Maid; Rising Star; The Cynical Store

=== 2018 ===
The 2018 festival took place from 10 to 11 August 2018.

Line-up
Stage	Day 1	Day 2
Sun Stage	Sakanaction; Denki Groove; Suchmos; SiM; KEMURI	Tokyo Ska Paradise Orchestra; Dragon Ash; Elephant Kashimashi; UVERworld; Tatsuro Yamashita; Maximum the Hormone; UNISON SQUARE GARDEN; 04 Limited Sazabys
Earth Tent	ORANGE RANGE; THE BAWDIES; SUPER BEAVER; yonige; Taiiku Okazaki	GRAPEVINE; coldrain; Wagakki Band; Kyuso Nekokami; the pillows; sumika; CreepHyp; OKAMOTO'S; BiSH
Red Star Field	Rekishi（for CAMPERS）; BRAHMAN; Gokumontō Ikka; Asian Kung-Fu Generation; The BONEZ; Sambomaster	My Hair is Bad; Takehara Pistol; The Birthday; Ego-Wrappin'; Tamio Okuda; The Cro-Magnons; Hanaregumi; Ohashi Trio; Mongol800
Red Star Cafe	Masashi Yamada（The Back Horn）; Takuro Sugawara（9mm Parabellum Bullet）; Yuumori Yamaguchi（SIX LOUNGE）; Katsuhiko Sakazume（Dohatsuten）	Chiaki（ex.Akaiko-en）; TOSHI-LOW; Kaneaiyoyoka; Rinda & Marya
Bohemian Garden	SCOOBIE DO（for CAMPERS）; golden jubilee; Tjiros; KICELL; Emi Nakamura; GOODLUCKHEIWA; Skirt	Theatre Brook; OKI DUB AINU BAND; Caravan; MY LIFE IS MY MESSAGE; JOY-POPS; Sunny Day Service; Yuta Orisaka; Emerson Kitamura & Sakana Hosomi; Sakura Fujiwara; Lucky Tapes
Bohemian Circus		Mugi the Cat / むぎ（猫）
Rainbow Shangri-La	Fishmans（for CAMPERS）; cero; Clammbon; Wednesday Campanella; BRADIO; Ame no Parade	SONIXTATION; Licaxxx; Ken Ishii; Takkyu Ishino; Keita Sano; yahyel; agraph; DEVICEGIRLS（VJ）; Chara; SPECIAL OTHERS; Your Song Is Good; Scha Dara Parr; PETROLZ; Dai Hirai
def garage	RSR FRIDAY NIGHT SESSION（for CAMPERS）; tribute to bloodthirsty butchers; Guitar Wolf; Panoramapanamatown; domico; SIX LOUNGE; Saucy Dog; su-xing-cyu; Friends; RISING★STAR; Young Ohara	Base Ball Bear; King Gnu; DATS; DYGL; Nariaki Obukuro; CHAI; POLYSICS; ZIGGY; brainchild's; Flower Companyz; Happy Heads NANIYORI; CILIVIAN; Ryokuoushoku Shakai; RISING★STAR; ZOOKARADERU

=== 2019 ===
The festival took place from the 16 to 17 August 2019. Because of Typhoon Krosa, day 1 had to be cancelled.

Line-up
Stage	Day 1 (CANCELLED)	Day 2
Sun Stage	Number Girl; The Hiatus; THE ORAL CIGARETTES; TOKYO SKA PARADISE ORCHESTRA	Dragon Ash; UVERworld; My Hair is Bad; ELLEGARDEN; WANIMA; LiSA; CreepHyp; Dohatsuten
Earth Tent	9mm Parabellum Bullet 15th Anniversary （for CAMPERS）; Aflo(MOROHA); Tabu Zombie(SOIL&"PIMP"SESSIONS); Ken Kurihara; yui & mura☆jun(FLOWER FLOWER); Straightener; SHANK; Hump Back; Band-Maid; Saucy Dog	Uchikubi Gokumon Doukoukai; Frederic; ROTTENGRAFFTY; Harukamirai; Kyuso Nekokami; THE KEBABS; Ryokuoushoku Shakai; the telephones; HEY-SMITH; Happy Heads NANIYORI
Red Star Field	Live Cinema "Kaiju No Oshie" Performed by TWIN TAIL（for CAMPERS）; Nulbarich; King Gnu; Motoharu Sano & THE COYOTE BAND; SHISHAMO; Michiko Shimizu	the pillows; Ging Nang Boyz; GLIM SPANKY; Koji Kikkawa; Gospellers; BEGIN; Aimer; Fujifabric
Red Star Cafe	Tohoku Live House Daisakusen	the LOW-ATUS（Takeshi Hosomi、TOSHI-LOW）; Hitomi Yaida; Katsuhiko Sakazume（Dohatsuten）; Seiya Yamasaki（Kyuso Nekokami）; BENBE
Bohemian Garden	Signals（for CAMPERS）; FRIDAY NIGHT SESSION （for CAMPERS）; NAKAIDO "CHAMBO" REICHI; TOSHI-LOW(BRAHMAN/OAU); Leyona; Rei; Yoshitomo Nara; OAU(OVERGROUND ACOUSTIC UNDERGROUND); Hiroji Miyamoto; Tjiros; Rei; Katteni-Shiyagare	Tavito Nanao; Hokkai Cantabile（Tamio Okuda and more）; MOROHA; ANARCHY; Bugi Ren; Magokoro Brothers～Ishikari Folk Village～; Tamio Okuda; Remi Matsuo(GLIM SPANKY); Kazunobu Mineta(Ging Nang Boyz); Soichiro Yamauchi(Fujifabric); Homecomings; HEA; DEPAPEKO(Kotaro Oshio×DEPAPEPE); ASA-CHANG Emerson Kitamura
Bohemian Circus	Tres Joyeux(Chieko Kinbara×Ayano Kasahara); Aozora Hayashi	Haruka to Miyuki; yaiko(Hitomi Yaida) × takataka; Soushi Sakiyama; Heavenstamp(Sally#Cinnamon・Tomoya.S)
Rainbow Shangri-La	QUEENESS（for CAMPERS）; Yoru no Honki Dance; DYGL; FIVE NEW OLD; Shikao Suga; Awesome City Club	SONIXTATION; Takkyu Ishino; DEVICEGIRLS（VJ）; YAMACHANG（LASER）; THA BLUE HERB; RALLYE'S JAM (Lucky Tapes, DATS, TENDRE & more); SOIL&"PIMP"SESSIONS; H ZETTRIO; Mitsuyoshi Azuma & The Swinging Boppers with Kiyoshi Matsutakeya; never young beach; Kan
def garage	Kaho Nakamura（for CAMPERS）; the dresscodes; tricot; Attractions; TENDRE; ZOOKARADERU; NECRY TALKIE; RISING★STAR; Suzuki Mikikozu	DMBQ; Shinsei Kamattechan; OGRE YOU AS*HOLE; mol-74; toe; Kankakupiero; Asurasyndrome; FINLANDS; a flood of circle; Akaiko-en; Macaroni Enpitsu; RISING★STAR; FERN PLANET

== Gallery ==
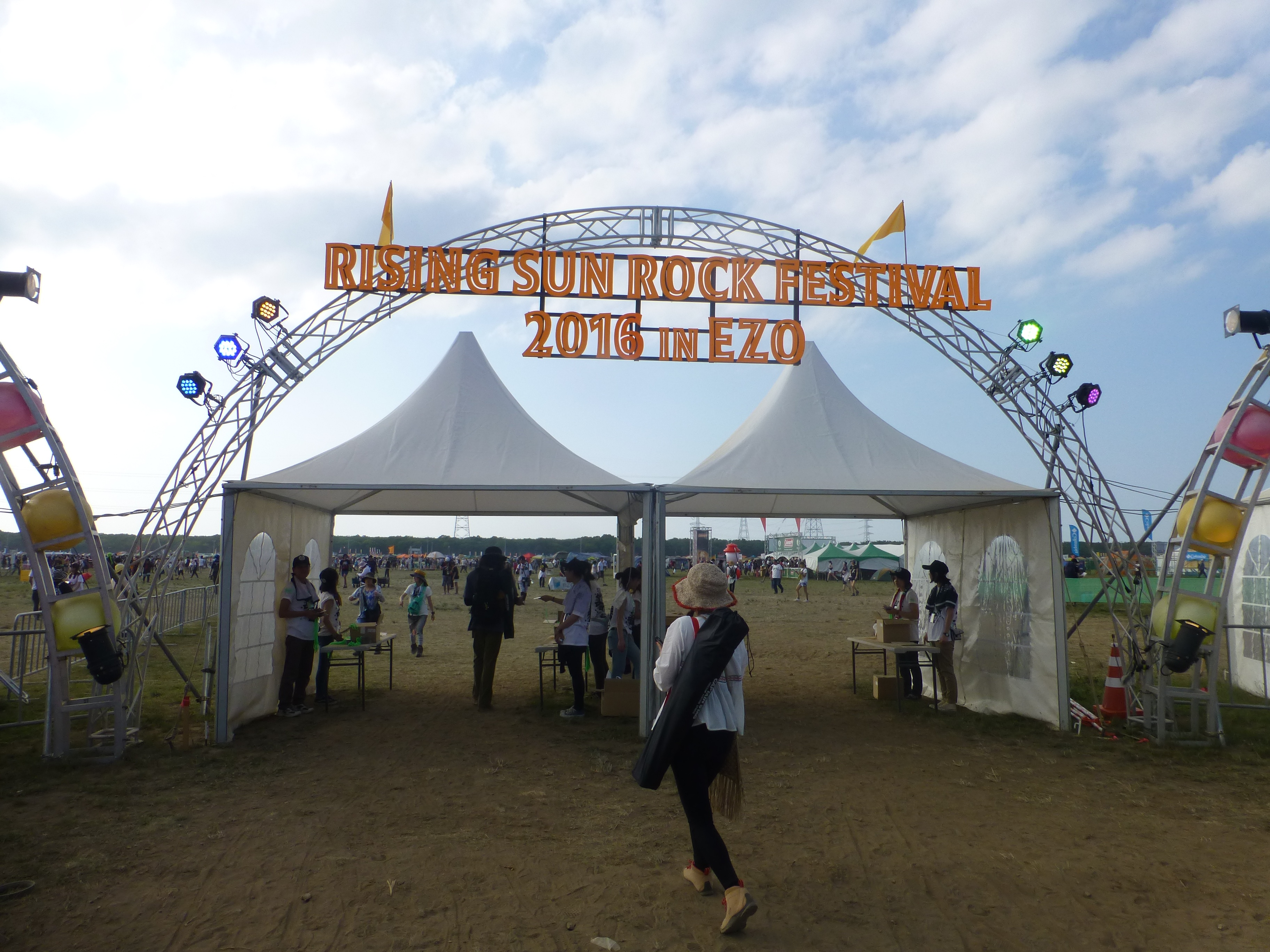
2016

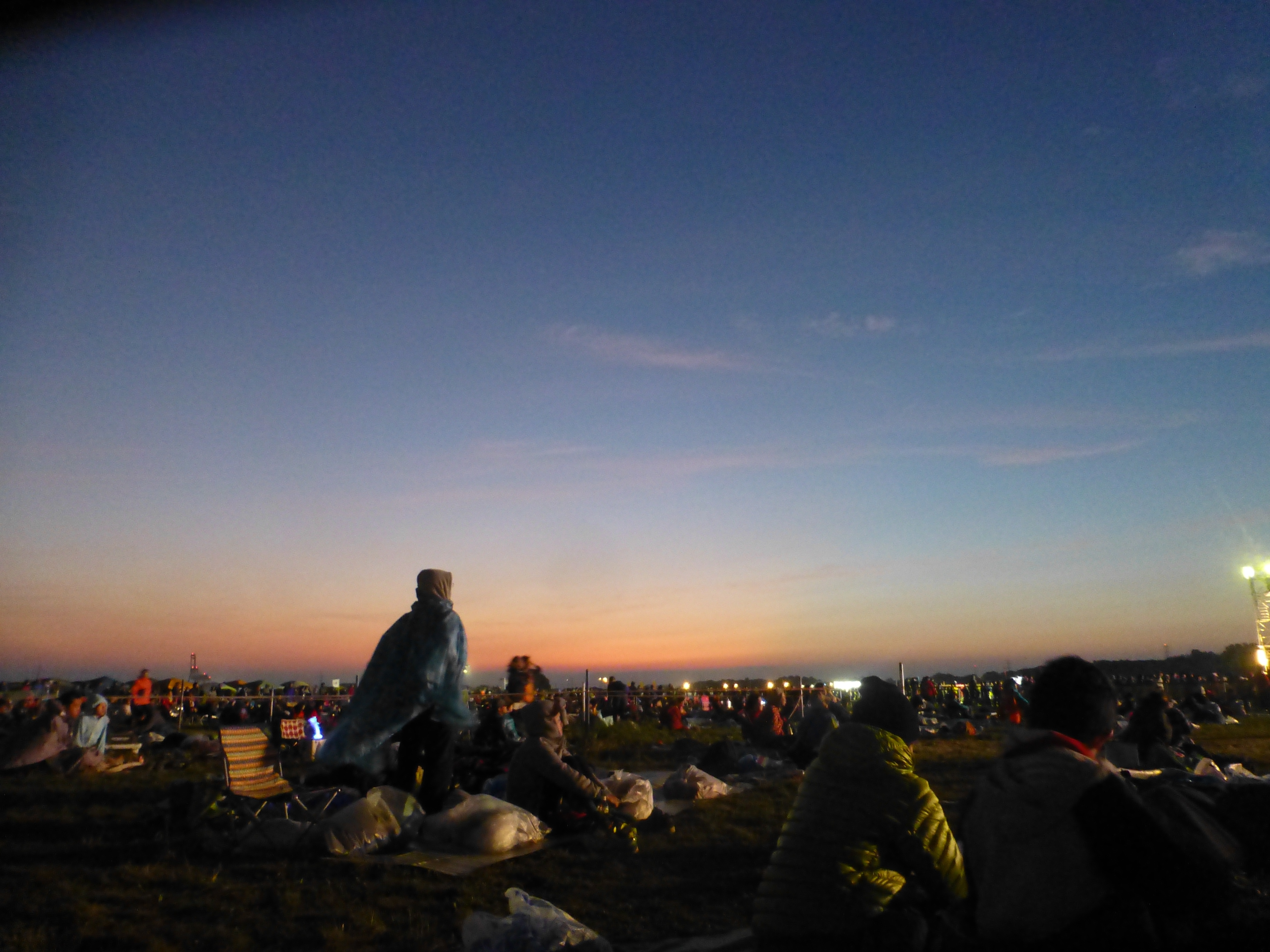
2016

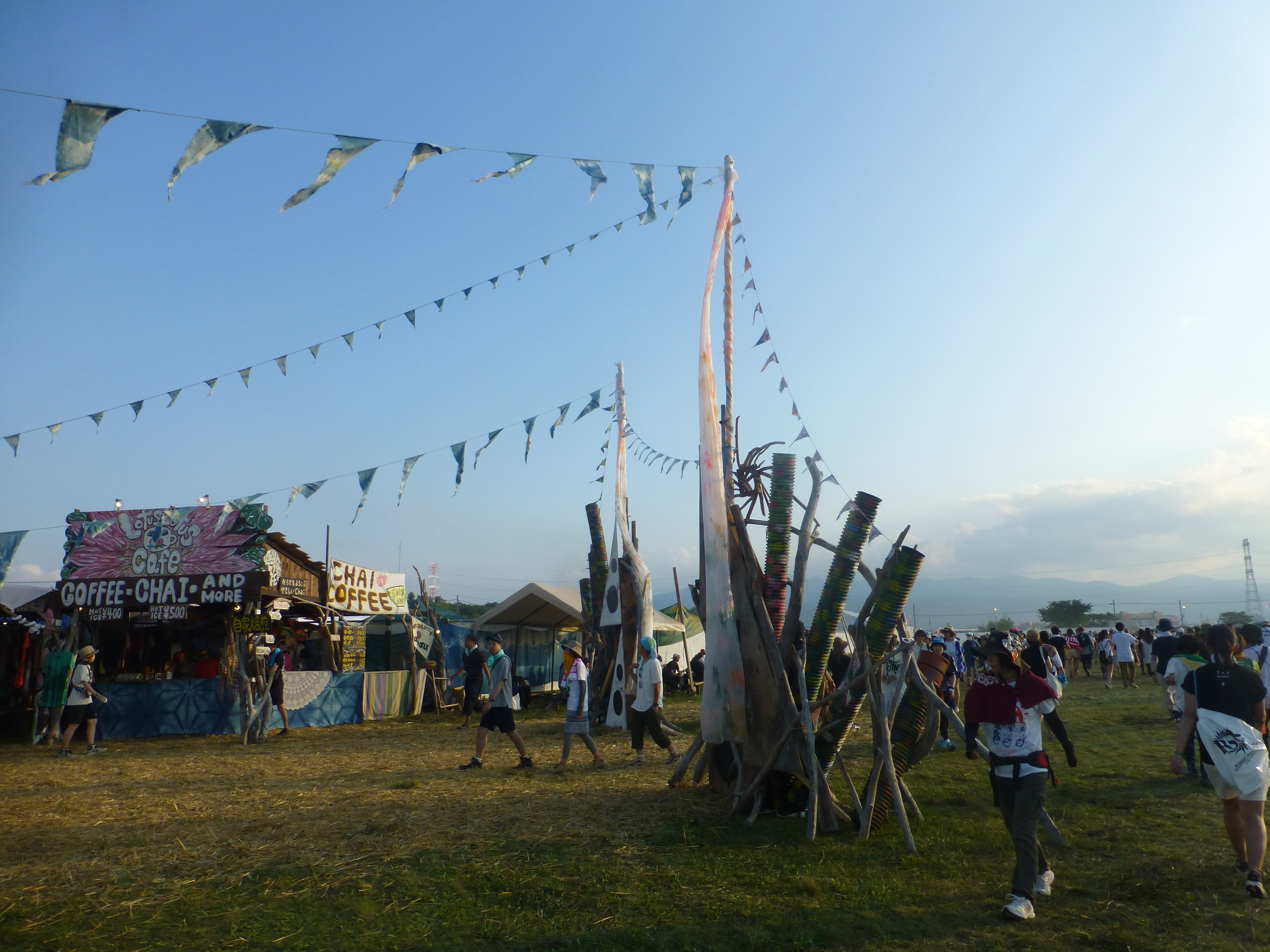
2016

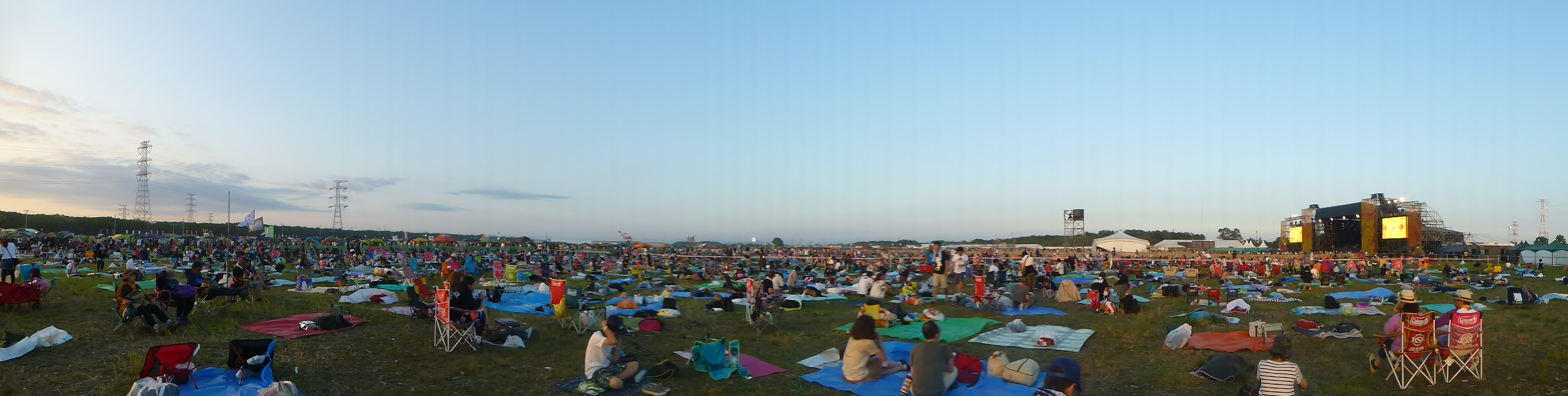
2016

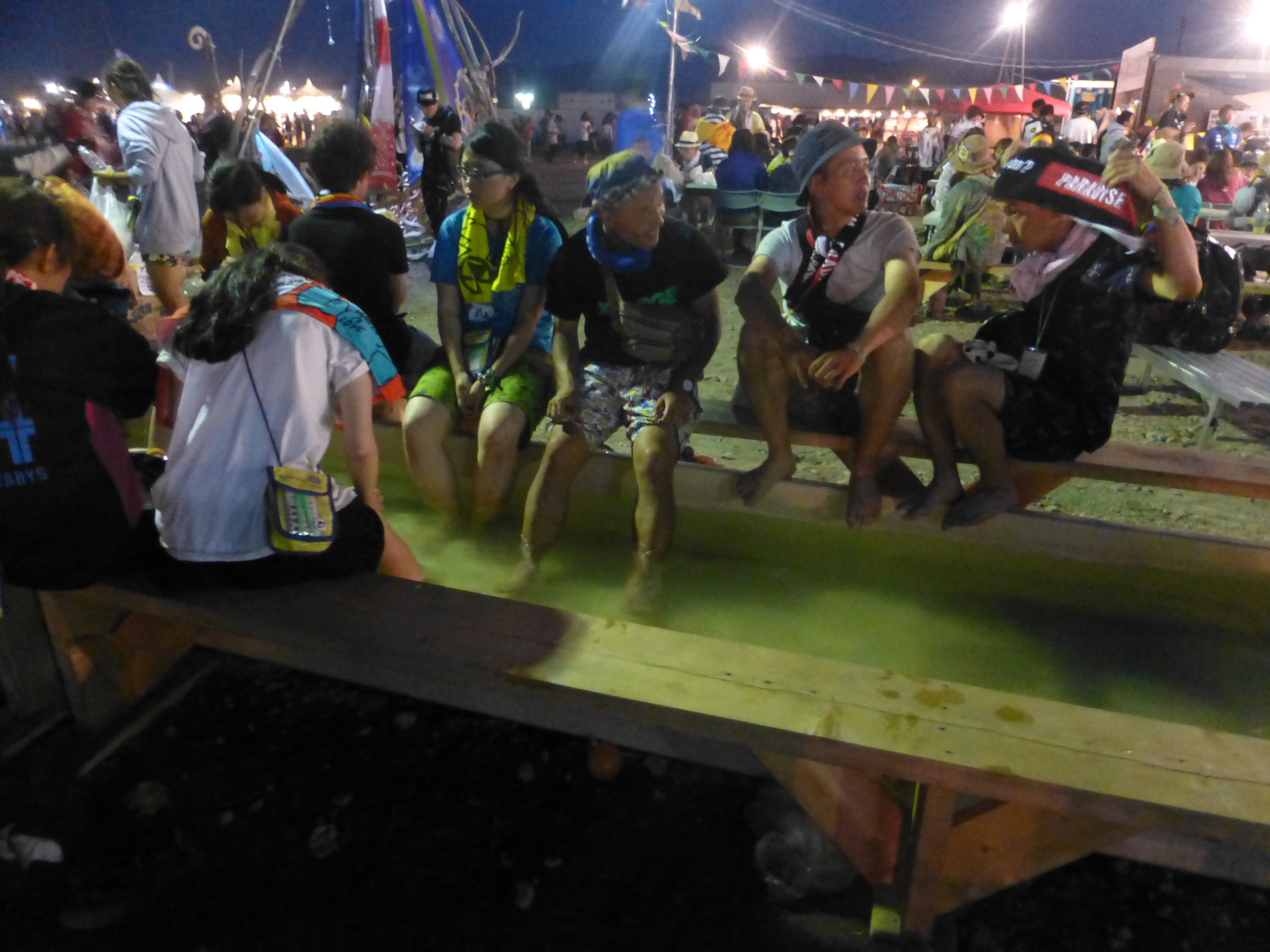
2016
