= Bonobo (disambiguation) =

The bonobo is an endangered species of great ape.

Bonobo or Bonobos may also refer to:

- Bonobo (musician), British producer, musician and DJ
- Bonobos (band), a Japanese rock band
- Bonobo (2014 film), a British comedy-drama film
- Bonobo (2018 film), a Swiss short film
- Bonobo (GNOME), a component framework
- Bonobos (apparel), a men's apparel company
