= Pees =

Pees may refer to:

- Dean Pees (born 1949), American football coach
- The Pees, a Japanese 3-piece rock band
- Urination

== See also ==
- Peas
- Pee (disambiguation)
- PEES, a family of thermoplastic polymers
