= YamaArashi =

Japanese rock band

- Origin: Kanagawa, Japan
- Genres: Nu metal
- Years active: 1996–present
- Labels: Chokkyu Recordings
- Members: Yoshiaki Ishii; Takeshi; Kaji; Naoya Kojima; Satoshi Ohtake; Oga
- Website: yamaarashi.net

YamaArashi (stylized as YAMAARASHI (山嵐)) is a six-member Japanese rock group based in Kanagawa Prefecture.

YamaArashi has performed with popular acts such as HeavensDust, Orange Range and Moomin. In 2008, YamaArashi played in the ETPFEST, the South Korean music festival alongside bands such as Dragon Ash and Death Cab for Cutie.

== Musical style ==
YamaArashi's style of music is mainly categorized as nu metal. The band has also been described as rapcore and rap metal with an added influence of reggae fusion in their music.

== Members ==
- Yoshiaki Ishii – Drums
- Takeshi – Bass and Vocal
- Kaji – Guitar
- Naoya Kojima – Vocal
- Satoshi Ohtake – Vocal
- Oga – Guitar. Joined YamaArashi in 2000. Former Member of Mach25.

== Discography ==
=== Singles ===
- 1997.06.21: A New Species
- 1998.06.21: Yogen (予言)
- 1999.03.05: The Ties of Lycaon
- 2000.08.23: Black Hole/Hologram (ブラックホール／ホログラム)
- 2000.12.06: Wide Vision
- 2001.09.27: Yamaarashi-ism (ヤマアラシイズム)
- 2002.06.19: Itadaki (山嶺(いただき))
- 2003.10.22: La La Singin' Music feat. Leyona
- 2003.12.03: Arashi 2003 feat Rappagariya (嵐2003 feat.ラッパ我リヤ)
- 2006.02.22: Go Your Way, The ending theme for the anime The Frogman Show, produced by Seiji Kameda

=== Albums ===
- 1997: YamaArashi (山嵐)
- 1999: Mitaiken Zone (未体験ゾーン)
- 2001: Six Men (シックスメン)
- 2002: Mountain Rock (マウンテンロック)
- 2003: Colors Water Music, Collaboration Album
- 2005: Aiterasu (アイテラス)
- 2006: Shonan Mirai Ezu (湘南未来絵図)
- 2008: Noroshi (狼煙 -Noroshi-)

=== Split albums ===
2005.02.23: Kakumei (革命) (YamaArashi vs. Rize)

=== Live albums ===
- 2003.03.26: Live

=== Compilations ===
- 2001.11.28: 1997–2001 Single Collection
- 2002.05.22: Super Best

=== DVDs ===
- 2000.06.28: Mitaiken Zone Tour '99 (未体験ゾーンTOUR'99)
- 2001.07.25: Six Men Tour '01 (シックスメンツアー'01)
- 2002.03.27: Film Collection
- 2004.06.23: 6 Colors
