= Mugi the Cat =

Japanese singer-songwriter (born 1997)

Mugi the Cat むぎ（猫）
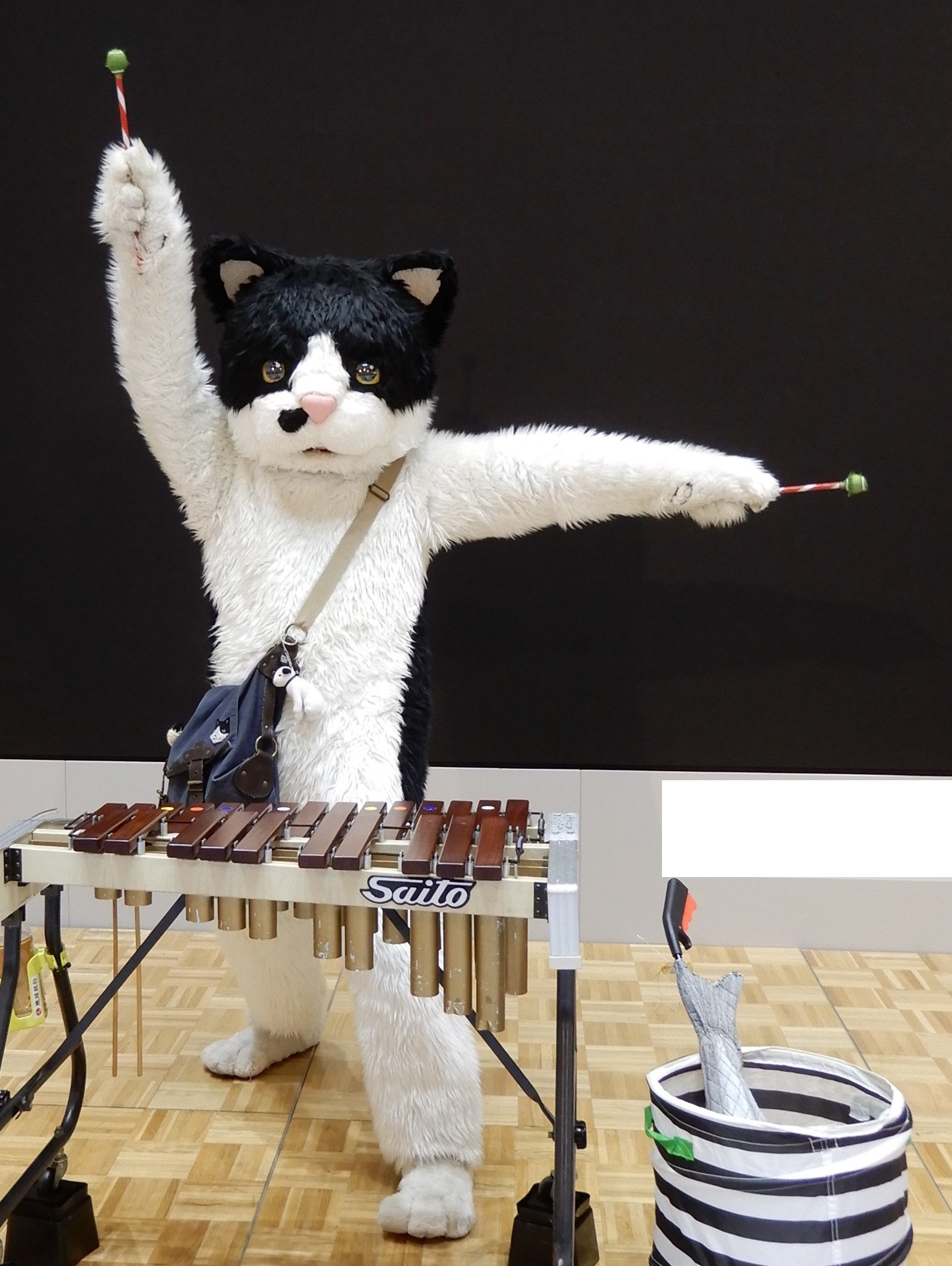
- Mugi the Cat

Background information
- Born: 1997/2014; Tokyo, Japan
- Genres: J-Pop
- Instruments: xylophone, drums, piano
- Years active: 2014 -present
- Labels: Speedstar Records
- Website: www.mugithecat.com

Mugi the Cat (むぎ(猫)) is a Japanese feline singer-songwriter. His main instrument is the xylophone. Born in Tokyo, he now lives in Uruma City, Okinawa, Japan.

== History ==
=== Pre-music ===
Mugi the Cat was created by Yusaku, in memory of his real cat that lived from 1997 to 2009. As a reference, Mugi carries the sub-title "The Cat which came back from Heaven."
In 2014, he made his first appearance in his current form.

Initially, he had no plans to become a musician. He only wanted to go for walks and say hello to several people. But soon, he became popular on Twitter and was invited to events related to cats. Soon after, he started performing music, singing, talking, and dancing to entertain his fans.

=== Being a musician ===
Mugi's music career started with performances at events and festivals, including those with an international audience. In 2017, he was the first cat to ever play at the Fuji Rock Festival. Other festival appearances include Rising Sun Rock Festival, Wild Bunch Festival, and Matsumoto Ringo Festival.

2017 October: joined SPEEDSTAR MUSIC
2019 March: major debut album on SPEEDSTAR RECORDS, "君に会いに"
2019 March: launch of official fan club "Hachiware-Tengoku"
2019 June/July: first nationwide tour in Japan. More nationwide tours in 2021 (13 cities) and 2023 (5 cities).
2019 April: started hosting the radio show "blanks", weekly on FM Okinawa

== Music ==
=== Creating music ===
Mugi writes and records his music at home, including playing the piano, the xylophone, and the drums. The guitar parts are played by his friend Satoshi (新垣智), who can also frequently be seen in the short films used during the live shows. Mugi's music includes many different genres, like Pop, Rock, Hip-Hop, etc. Most songs are about a cat's view of the world. All songs are suitable for children, but not made for children. The lyrics are simple at first glance but meaningful when looking deeper and include many wordplays. Mugi is an advocate for kindness and peace, which is also reflected in his songs.

=== Live performances ===
During the live performances, Mugi sings and plays the Xylophone, sometimes also an Eisa drum. The rest of the music comes from the sound system. He uses a lot of homemade accessories to underline his songs and is also dancing to most of the songs. Homemade short films are played when there are breaks in lengthy concerts. He often goes on business trips from Okinawa to other prefectures, to play live concerts or attend events. After his concerts Mugi often greets fans, takes photos, and signs autographs.

== Appearance on national TV ==
TV appearances
Song title	TV station	Program name	Song used as	Date
君に会いに	Fuji TV	ジャンクSPORTS	Ending theme	April 2019
ねっこほって	NHK Eテレ	ねこねこ日本史	Ending theme	Since November 13, 2019
るすばん天国	Fuji TV	Love Music	Live performance & greeting	May 11, 2020
12 different songs	Kids Station	うたのじかんライブ	Live performance broadcast	From June 6, 2020, 1 song per week
窓辺の猫	TBS	プレバト!!	Ending theme	August and September 2020

== Coverage in print media ==
Nation-wide magazines and newspapers
Magazine title	Publisher	Edition	Page no.
ねこ	Neko Publishing Co., Ltd.	No. 110, spring 2019	16-21
Rockin'On Japan	Rockin'on Holdings Inc.	5/2019	270-271
ねこぱんち (Neko Panchi)	Shonengahosha	No.158	152-160 (Manga)
An An	Magazine House Ltd.	No. 2179	139
ねこ	Neko Publishing Co., Ltd.	No. 113, winter 2020	61-64
Asahi Shimbun	Asahi Shimbun	Jan. 23rd 2020	?
Music UP's	Japan Music Network	Vol. 190	14-15
MOE	Hakusensha	Vol. Nov.2020	48
POTATO	ONE Publishing	Vol. Jun.2023	128

Regional magazines and newspapers
Magazine title	Region	Edition	Coverage
おきなわ倶楽部 (Okinawa Club)	Okinawa	Jan. 2018	Cover photo & interview
箆柄暦 (piratsuka, Okinawa event guide)	Okinawa	March 2019	Cover story
オキナワグラフ(The Okinawa Graph)	Okinawa	No.690 (Sep.2019)	Cover photo

== Discography ==
=== Albums ===
『天国かもしれない』 （2017）
『君に会いに』 （2019, limited edition CD+DVD: VIZL-1547、regular edition CD: VICL-65132）
『Song of Life』 (2023, special edition: VOSF-11930, regular edition: VICL-65818)

=== EPs ===
『ねっこほって e.p.』（2019、Limited edition CD+DVD+plush-keyholder: VIZL-1666、Regular edition CD: VICL-65266）
『窓辺の猫 e.p.』（2020、Limited edition special packaging: VICL-65414、Regular edition CD: VICL-65415）

=== Guest appearance ===
Schroeder-Headz 『ゲスト・スイート』（2019、VICL-65267）「Surface」
