= Killing Boy =

Japanese rock band

Killing Boy is a rock band of Japan.

== History ==
In 2010, ART-SCHOOL's Kinoshitariki was formed by former members of Hinata Hidekazu. At 31 December in the same year, COUNTDOWN JAPAN 10/11 MOON STAGE do the first live.

March 2011, "Killing Boy" that have its own label named "VeryApe Records" was released as first album.

== Members ==
- Kinoshitariki (Guitar, Vocal, Synthesizer)
- Hinata Hidekazu (Base, Synthesizer) - Straightener, Nothing's Carved in Stone works as a bassist.

=== Regular support ===
- Shinichi Ito (Guitar) - Original guitarist of SPARTA LOCALS and HINTO.
- Okita Takashi Tadashi (Drum) - Hinata enrolled in the drummer of Nothing's Carved in Stone.

Okita and Ito is participating in both live and recording.

== Discography ==
=== Album ===
1. Killing Boy (9 March 2011, 39th Oricon)
2. Destroying Beauty (6 June 2012, 34th Oricon)
