= Katteni-Shiyagare =

Japanese swing/jazz band

Katteni-Shiyagare (勝手にしやがれ) is a swing/jazz band with punk influences, formed in 1997, with its major label debut on Epic Records Japan in 2004. They are perhaps best known in the US for the opening theme to the Japanese series Kemonozume, "Auvers Blue" as well as the first opening to the anime Gallery Fake, "Ragtime". They also performed a cover of Cole Porter's "You'd Be So Nice to Come Home To" with fellow Sony Music Japan artist Mika Nakashima, which was released on the Katteni-Shiyagare tribute album and also included with her single Eien no Uta.

== Members ==
- Kazu "Kazz" Tanaka (田中和) (trumpet)
- Shinobu Fukushima (福島忍) (trombone and vocals)
- Shōhei Mutō (武藤昭平) (drums and lead vocals)
- Masaki Urano (浦野正樹) (double bass)
- Takeshi Taura (田浦健) (tenor saxophone)
- Sei Iijima (飯島誓) (baritone saxophone)
- Junichirō Saitō (斉藤淳一郎) (piano)
