= Shibusashirazu Orchestra =

Japanese jazz orchestra

Shibusashirazu Orchestra 渋さ知らズ
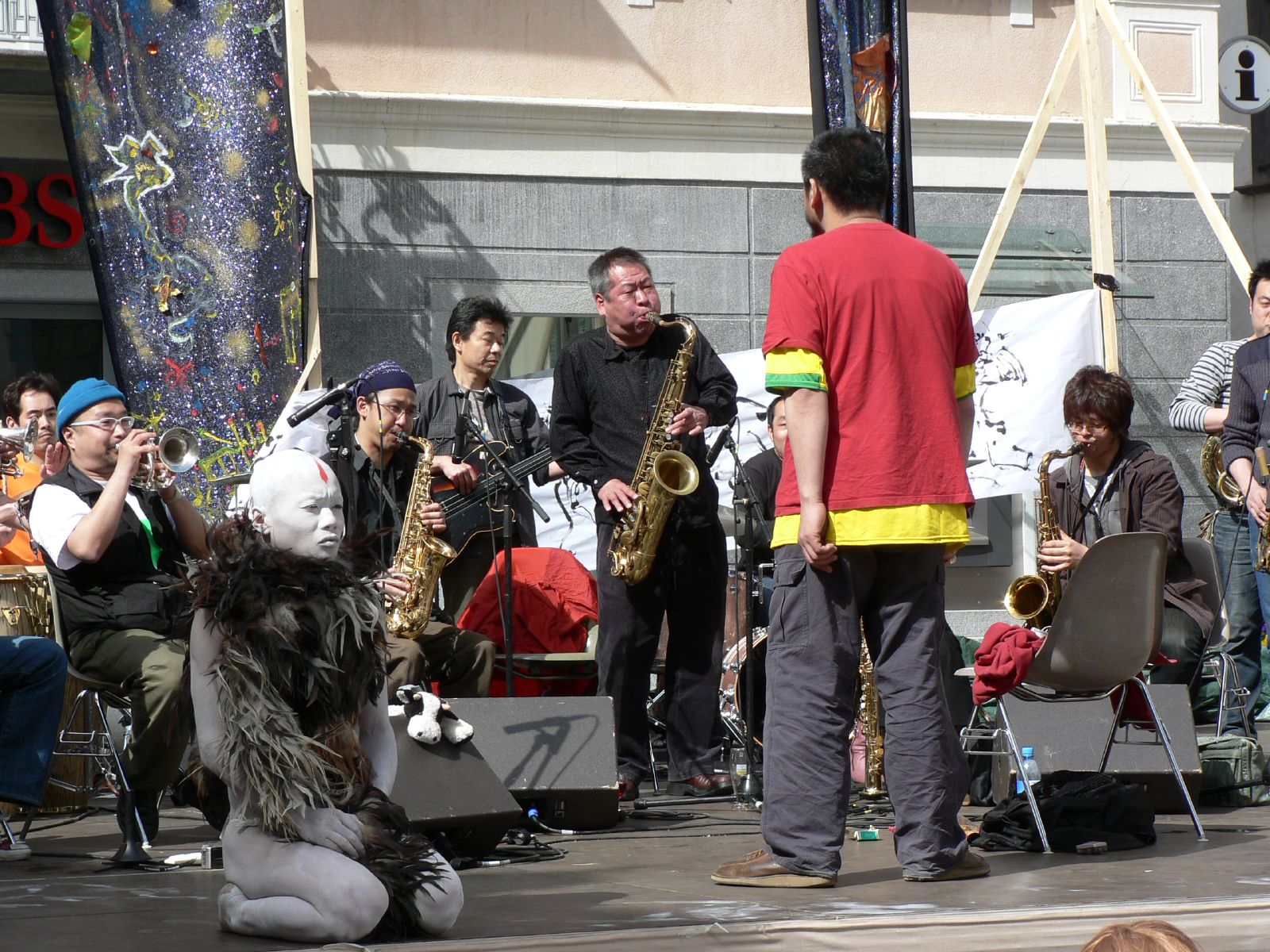
- Shibusashirazu Orchestra in 2005

Background information
- Origin: Japan
- Genres: Jazz; Rock; Jazz fusion
- Years active: 1989–present
- Label: Avex Trax
- Website: http://shibusa.net/

Shibusashirazu (渋さ知らズ, Shibusashirazu; roughly, "we don't understand/are unaffected by cool"), often lengthened to Shibusashirazu Orchestra, is a Japanese jazz orchestra. The group was formed in 1989 by bassist Daisuke Fuwa and since then many of Japan's jazz musicians, Butoh dancers and other performance artists have passed through the orchestra.

The majority of the group's original work is composed and arranged by Daisuke Fuwa. Their style stems from the jazz movement of the 60s, with the influence of 80s punk and No Wave. Although featuring extended free improvisation, there is also an element of rock music that makes the orchestra more accessible to a wider audience than a lot of other free jazz.

In 2007 they signed to Avex Trax, one of Japan's leading labels for commercial pop and dance music.

The orchestra performed four times in a row at the annual Fuji Rock Festival from 2000 and have performed at the Glastonbury Festival in 2002 and 2016. They tour Europe frequently although are not well known in the United States.

== Discography ==
- Dettaramen (Nutmeg, 1993)
- Shibusamichi (Nutmeg, 1993)
- Something Different (Chitei, 1994)
- Be Cool (Chitei, 1995)
- Shibusai (Chitei, 1997)
- On Stage at Amsterdam (New Gate, 1999)
- Shiburyu (Chitei, 1999)
- Shibu-Hata (Chitei, 2002)
- Shibuboshi (Chitei, 2004)
- Never Be Cool Naked (Mona, 2004)
- Shibusa Shirazu Orchestra (Aright's, 2005)
- Lost Direction (Moers Music, 2005)
- Katayama Hiroaki with Shibusashirazu (Studio Wee, 2006)
- Shibuzen (Avex Io, 2006)
- Shibuki (Avex Io, 2007)
- Paris Shibu Bukyoku (Chitei, 2008)
- Shibu-Yotabi Plankton (Vivo, 2010)
- Shibusaikayoutaizen (Tokuma Japan Communications, 2014)
- Juju (Chitei, 2017)
