= Ame no Parade =

Japanese rock band

ame_no_parade
- Origin: Kagoshima, Japan
- Genres: indie rock, alternative rock
- Years active: 2013–present
- Labels: Zankyo, Speedstar
- Members: Kohei Fukunaga; Kosuke Yamazaki; Mineho Osawa
- Past members: Ryosuke Korenaga; Haruna Tono; Aya Hashimoto kari
- Website: amenoparade.com

Ame no Parade (雨のパレード, Ame no Paredo) is a three-piece rock band from Kagoshima, Japan.

== Band members ==
=== Current members ===
- Kohei Fukunaga - lead vocal
- Kosuke Yamazaki - guitar
- Mineho Osawa - drums

=== Past members ===
- Ryosuke Korenaga - bass
- Naruna Tono - painter
- Aya Hashimoto - jewelry designer
- kari - costume designer

== Discography ==
=== Albums ===
==== Studio albums ====
Title	Album details	Peak chart positions	
Title	Album details	JPN Oricon	JPN Billboard
New Generation	Released: March 2, 2016; Label: Speedstar; Formats: CD, digital download	49	58
Change Your Pops	Released: March 8, 2017; Label: Speedstar; Formats: CD, digital download	29	38
Reason of Black Color	Released: March 14, 2018; Label: Speedstar; Formats: CD, digital download	25	22
Borderless	Released: January 22, 2020; Label: Victor Entertainment; Formats: CD, digital download	27	—

==== Extended plays ====
Title	EP details	Peak chart positions	
Title	EP details	JPN Oricon	JPN Billboard
Petrichor	Released: 2013; Label: Self-released; Formats: CD	—	—
Sense	Released: October 8, 2014; Label: Zankyo; Formats: CD, digital download	—	—
New Place	Released: July 1, 2015; Label: Zankyo; Formats: CD, digital download	183	—

=== Singles ===
==== As lead artist ====
Title	Year	Peak chart positions			Album
Title	Year	JPN	JPN Radio	JPN CD	Album
"Tokyo"	2016	76	7	—	New Generation
"You"	2016	35	6	30	Change Your Pops
"Stage"	2016	36	2	28	Change Your Pops
"Shoes"	2017	55	10	27	Reason of Black Color
"Ahead Ahead"	2019	—	—	—	Borderless

==== Promotional singles ====
Title	Year	Peak chart positions		Album
Title	Year	JPN	JPN Radio	Album
"Change Your Mind"	2017	89	12	Change Your Pops
"March"	2018	—	—	Reason of Black Color
"Reason of Black Color"	2018	—	—	Reason of Black Color

== Awards and nominations ==
Year	Award	Category	Work	Result	Ref.
2016	2016 MTV Video Music Awards Japan	Best New Artist Video (Japan)	"You"	Nominated	
