= Lucky Tapes =

Japanese band

- Origin: Kanagawa Prefecture, Japan
- Genres: J-pop; rock; R&B; soul
- Years active: 2014–present
- Labels: Rallye Label (2014–2018); JVCKenwood Victor Entertainment (2018–present)
- Members: Kai Takahashi
- Past members: Tsubasa Hamada; Keito Taguchi; Kensuke Takahashi
- Website: luckytapes.com

Lucky Tapes (ラッキーテープス, Rakkī Tēpusu) is a Japanese music project led by vocalist Kai Takahashi. Originally formed by keyboardist and vocalist Kai Takahashi, bassist Keito Taguchi, and drummer Tsubasa Hamada in 2014, the previous lineup included guitarist Kensuke Takahashi after Hamada left in 2016. In 2023, Kensuke Takahashi and Keito Taguchi left the band.

== History ==
In May 2014, the band Slow Beach, which included keyboardist Kai Takahashi, broke up. The following month, Takahashi and two others, Keito Taguchi and Tsubasa Hamada, formed Lucky Tapes in June 2014. The band was backed up by guitarists Masahiko Akemi (from Tokyo Sapiens) and Kensuke Takahashi, who would later join the band. On July 19, they released their debut singles "Peace and Magic" and "Sunday Night" at the same time.

On April 2, 2015, they released the single "Touch!" with a music video. The video included actress Kaho Seto and the video received high praise. On August 5, 2015, they released their debut album, The Show, under Rallye Label. The album was popular so much that their first live show at Shibuya WWW sold out. On January 13, 2016, they released the single "Moon," alongside a music video that starred Shiori Takei. On July 6, 2016, they released their second album Cigarette & Alcohol. In 2017, they released the four-track single "Virtual Gravity," which included the previously unreleased song "Sherry."

On May 23, 2018, they released the EP 22, which included the single of the same name. In April 2018, the band held a tour for their upcoming album dressing. On September 25, 2018, they released the single "Lonely Lonely" featuring singer Chara, with a music video directed by Katsuki Kuroyanagi. On October 3, 2018, they released the album dressing. It was their first album release on a major record label, being JVCKenwood Victor Entertainment. In 2019, they released the single "Actor," which was previewed at Fuji Rock Festival 2019.

On November 25, 2020, the band released the album Blend, their first album in over two years. The album was recorded at their own homes because of the COVID-19 pandemic in Japan. The song "Wonderland" was featured as the theme song for the web series Match Girls. On July 1, 2023, Kensuke Takahashi and Keito Taguchi announced that they would be leaving the band, with the remaining member Kai Takahashi restarting the band under a new structure.

== Members ==
=== Current ===
- Kai Takahashi (高橋海) – lead vocalist, keyboardist (2014–present)

=== Former ===
- Tsubasa Hamada (濱田翼) – drums (2014–2016)
- Keito Taguchi (田口恵人) – bass (2014–2023)
- Kensuke Takahashi (高橋健介) – guitar (2014–2023)

== Discography ==
=== Studio albums ===
Title	Album details	Peak chart positions
Title	Album details	Oricon
The Show	Released: August 5, 2015; Label: Rallye Label; Format: Digital download, streaming	68
Cigarette & Alcohol	Released: July 6, 2016; Label: Rallye Label; Format: Digital download, streaming	64
dressing	Released: October 3, 2018; Label: JVCKenwood Victor Entertainment; Format: Digital download, streaming	44
Blend	Released: November 25, 2020; Label: JVCKenwood Victor Entertainment; Format: Digital download, streaming	78
Bitter!	Released: April 27, 2022; Label: JVCKenwood Victor Entertainment; Format: Digital download, streaming	100

=== Extended plays ===
Title	Album details	Peak chart positions
Title	Album details	Oricon
22	Released: May 23, 2018; Label: JVCKenwood Victor Entertainment; Format: Digital download, streaming	70
Live In (Personal) Space	Released: July 1, 2020; Label: JVCKenwood Victor Entertainment; Format: Digital download, streaming	70

=== Singles ===
List of singles as lead artist/feature
Title	Year	Peak chart positions	Album(s)/EP(s)
Title	Year	Oricon	Album(s)/EP(s)
"Peace and Magic"	2014	—	The Show
"Sunday Night"	2014	—	—N/a
"Touch!"	2015	194	The Show
"Moon"	2016	79	Cigarette & Alcohol
"Virtual Gravity"	2017	90	—N/a
"22"	2018	—	22
"Lonely Lonely" (featuring Chara)	2018	—	dressing
"Actor"	2019	—	Blend
"Mars"	2020	—	Blend
"Blue" (featuring kojikoji)	2020	—	Blend
"Trouble"	2020	—	Blend
"Randorī" (ランドリー)	2020	—	Blend
"Happiness" (featuring Haru)	2020	—	Blend
