= Passepied (band) =

Japanese band

Passepied (パスピエ)
- Origin: Japan
- Genres: J-Pop; Pop-rock
- Years active: 2009–present
- Labels: Warner Music Japan; Nehan Records
- Members: Haneda Narita (keyboard); Natsuki Ogoda (vocals); Katsuko Misawa (guitar); Yoshikuni Tsuyusaki (bass); Takuya Yao (drums)
- Website: passepied.info

Passepied (パスピエ, pasupie) is a five-member Japanese pop-rock band formed in Tokyo in 2009. They are signed with Nehan Records, an independent label under Universal Music Japan.

== Overview ==
Passepied was formed by Tokyo University of the Arts graduate and keyboardist, Narita Haneda.

== Discography ==
=== Singles ===
	Release date	Title	Album
1	2009	"passepied"	"Bunshin no Jutsu" (ブンシンノジュツ, Bunshin no jutsu)
2	January 9, 2013	"Namae no Nai Tori" (名前のない鳥, Namae no nai tori; "Birds with no name")	"Enshutsuka shutsuen" (演出家出演, Enshutsu-ka shutsuen; "Director who appeared")
3	February 27, 2013	"ON THE AIR"	"Enshutsuka shutsuen" (演出家出演, Enshutsu-ka shutsuen; "Director who appeared")
4	March 20, 2013	"Fever" (フィーバー, Fībā)	"Enshutsuka shutsuen" (演出家出演, Enshutsu-ka shutsuen; "Director who appeared")
5	May 22, 2014	"Saishū Densha featuring Izumi Makura (Fragment no REMIX)" (最終電車 featuring 泉まくら(FragmentのREMIX), Saishū densha fīcharingu izumi makura (Fragment no rimikkusu); "Last Train featuring Izumi Makura(REMIX of Fragment)")	Non-album single
6	October 27, 2013	"Tooryanse" (とおりゃんせ, Tōryanse)	"Makunouchi ISM" (幕の内ISM, Makunouchi izumu)
7	March 26, 2014	"MATATABISTEP/ Ano Ao to Ao to Ao" (MATATABISTEP/あの青と青と青, MATATABISTEP/ ano ao to ao to ao; "MATATABISTEP / That blue and blue and blue")	"Makunouchi ISM" (幕の内ISM, Makunouchi izumu)
8	November 15, 2014	"Zeitakuna Iiwake" (贅沢ないいわけ, Zeitakuna iiwake, "Luxury excuse")	"Shaba lover" (娑婆ラバ, Shaba raba; "Corrupt world lover")
9	April 29, 2015	"Tokinowa" (トキノワ)	"Shaba lover" (娑婆ラバ, Shaba raba; "Corrupt world lover")
10	July 29, 2015	"Ura no ura" (裏の裏, Ura no ura; "The back of the back")	"Shaba lover" (娑婆ラバ, Shaba raba; "Corrupt world lover")
11	April 27, 2016	"Yoakemae" (ヨアケマエ)	&DNA
12	July 27, 2016	"Naga sugita haru/ Hyper-realist" (永すぎた春 / ハイパーリアリスト, Naga sugita haru/ haipāriarisuto; "Too Permanent Spring / hyper-realist")	&DNA
13	November 23, 2016	"May Day" (メーデー, mēdē; "May Day")	&DNA
14	June 30, 2017	"Akatsuki" (あかつき, akatsuki; "Dawn")	"OTONARI-san" (OTONARIさん, "Mr. OTONARI")
15	July 15, 2019	"One (After Humor Remix)"	more humor
16	February 5, 2020	"Madara" (まだら, madara; "Mottled")	synonym
17	June 10, 2020	"Mahiru no Yoru" (真昼の夜, mahiru no yoru; "Midday Night")	synonym
18	August 26, 2020	"SYNTHESIZE"	synonym
19	May 26, 2021	"Goodbye" (グッド・バイ, goodbuy)	"Nui" (ニュイ, Nyui)
20	July 14, 2021	"Kagetachinu" (影たちぬ, Kage-tachinu; "Shadows")	"Nui" (ニュイ, Nyui)
21	August 25, 2021	"Music" (ミュージック, Myūjikku)	"Nui" (ニュイ, Nyui)
22	September 15, 2021	"Understanding" (アンダスタンディング, Andasutandingu)	"Nui" (ニュイ, Nyui)
23	October 9, 2021	"Iwanakya" (言わなきゃ, Iwanakya; "I have to say")	"Nui" (ニュイ, Nyui)
24	October 27, 2021	"Misemono" (見世物, Misemono; "Freak show")	"Nui" (ニュイ, Nyui)
25	November 23, 2021	"PLAYER"	"Nui" (ニュイ, Nyui)
26	April 14, 2022	"mononokedamono" (もののけだもの, Monono keda mono; "Animal")	ukabubaku
27	June 8, 2022	4×4	ukabubaku
28	August 24, 2022	"Spika" (スピカ, Supika; "Spika")	ukabubaku
29	October 5, 2022	"Binetsu" (微熱, "Slight Fever")	ukabubaku
30	October 19, 2022	"Fuyuu sou" (浮遊層, Fuyū-sō; "Floating People")	ukabubaku
31	November 2, 2022	"Kahatare doki ni" (かはたれ時に, "At Dawn")	ukabubaku
32	November 16, 2022	"Hasshoku" (発色, "Coloring")	ukabubaku
33	April 19, 2023	"GOKKO"	"Inshō banshō uzō mushō" (印象万象有象無象, “Impressions of all things, all things, all things”)
34	June 7, 2023	"Basilico" (バジリコ, Fuyū-sō; "Basil")	"Inshō banshō uzō mushō" (印象万象有象無象, “Impressions of all things, all things, all things”)
35	October 11, 2023	"Kaseki no uta" (化石のうた, "The Fossil Song")	"Inshō banshō uzō mushō" (印象万象有象無象, “Impressions of all things, all things, all things”)
36	November 15, 2023	"cube"	"Inshō banshō uzō mushō" (印象万象有象無象, “Impressions of all things, all things, all things”)
37	May 22, 2024	"Hiraishin" (避雷針, "Lightning Rod")	"ACHARAKA" (あちゃらか)
38	August 14, 2024	"21st century song of super high quality" (21世紀流超高性能歌曲, "21st century streaming ultra high performance songs")	"ACHARAKA" (あちゃらか)
39	December 18, 2024	"2009"	"CALIGULA" (カリギュラ)
40	February 5, 2025	"Denei musou shoujo" (電影夢想少女, "Film-Dreamer Girl")	"CALIGULA" (カリギュラ)
41	July 23, 2025	"Aoao" (青々, "Blue blue")	"IMI"
42	September 10, 2025	"Shiawase no kehai" (しあわせの気配, "A sign of happiness")	"IMI"
43	September 10, 2025	"Bonnou Go West" (煩悩ゴーウェスト, "Worldly desires go west")	"IMI"
44	February 4, 2026	"DOWNTOWN GIRL"	"IMI"
45	July 8, 2026	"Mekemeke" (メケメケ)	

=== Mini albums ===
	Release date	Title
1	March 2010	"Bunshin no Jutsu" (ブンシンノジュツ, Bunshin no jutsu; "shadow cloning technique")
2	November 23, 2011	"Watashi Kaika Shita wa" (わたし開花したわ, Watashi kaika shita wa; "Was my flowering")
3	July 27, 2012	"ONOMIMONO"
4	October 18, 2017	"OTONARI-san" (OTONARIさん, "Mr. OTONARI")
5	April 4, 2018	"Neon to Tora" (ネオンと虎, neon to tora; "Neon and Tiger")
6	February 19, 2025	"CALIGULA" (カリギュラ)

=== Full albums ===
	Release date	Title
1	June 12, 2013	"Enshutsu-ka Shutsuen" (演出家出演, Enshutsu-ka shutsuen; "Director who appeared")
2	June 16, 2014	"Makunouchi ISM" (幕の内ISM, Makunouchi izumu)
3	September 9, 2015	"Shaba lover" (娑婆ラバ, Shaba raba; "Corrupt world mule")
4	January 25, 2017	&DNA
5	May 22, 2019	more humor
6	December 9, 2020	synonym
7	December 8, 2021	"Nui" (ニュイ, Nyui)
8	December 7, 2022	ukabubaku
9	December 6, 2023	"Inshō banshō uzō mushō" (印象万象有象無象, “Impressions of all things, all things, all things”)
10	August 28, 2024	"ACHARAKA" (あちゃらか)
11	February 25, 2025	"IMI"

=== English albums ===
	Release date	Title
1	October 22, 2014	MAKUNOUCHI-ISM e.p.

=== Live albums ===
	Release date	Title
1	March 27, 2019	"Yaon One-Man Live "Insyo H" Digest (Live at Hibiya Yagai Dai Ongakudo, 2018.10.6)" (野音ワンマンライブ "印象H" 2018.10.6 at 日比谷野外大音楽堂 digest)

=== Compilation albums ===
	Release date	Title
1	April 20, 2015	"OZASHIKI MUSIQUE"

=== Other works ===
	Release date	Title	Album
1	March 9, 2016	"Feel" (among Unborde All Stars)	Feel + Unborde Greatest Hits
2	July 24, 2019	場違いハミングバード ("Bachigai Hummingbird", Out of place Hummingbird)	Thank you, Rock Bands! – UNISON SQUARE GARDEN 15th Anniversary Tribute Album -

== Videography ==
=== Live DVDs ===
	Release date	Title
1	April 6, 2016	"Live at Nihon Budokan "GOKURAKU"" (Live at 日本武道館"GOKURAKU", Raibu at Nihonbudōkan" GOKURAKU")
2	August 23, 2017	"Passepied Tour 2017 "DANDANANDDNA" Live at NHK HALL"" (パスピエ Tour 2017 "DANDANANDDNA" Live at NHK HALL, Pasupie Tour 2017" DANDANANDDNA" raibu at NHK HALL 2017")

== Books ==
- "Passepied / Official Band Score 2011–2013" (パスピエ/オフィシャル・バンドスコア 2011–2013) (September 20, 2014)
