= Sunny Day Service =

Japanese rock band

- Origin: Japan
- Genres: alternative rock; indie pop; folk rock; pop rock
- Years active: 1992–2000; 2008-present
- Labels: Universal/Polygram
- Members: Keiichi Sokabe; Takashi Tanaka; Daikuhara Mikio
- Past members: Norio Katayama; Kiyoshi Kodama; Harushige Maruyama

Sunny Day Service (サニーデイ・サービス) is a three-piece Japanese rock band which formed in 1992.

== Members ==
Current members

- Keiichi Sokabe (曽我部恵一, Sokabe Keiichi) – guitars, lead vocals (1992–present)
- Takashi Tanaka (田中貴, Tanaka Takashi) – bass guitar, vocals (1992–present)
- Mikio Daikuhara (大工原幹雄, Daikuhara Mikio) – drums (2020–present)

Former members

- Norio Katayama (片山紀夫, Katayama Norio) – percussion (1992–1995)
- Kiyoshi Kodama (児玉清, Kodama Kiyoshi) – keyboards (1993-1995)
- Harushige Maruyama (丸山晴茂, Maruyama Harushige) – drums (1995-2018)

== History ==
The band formed in 1992, originally made up of Keiichi, Takashi and other members. In this form, they published "Cosmo-Sports" and "Super Disco". In 1994, they released "Hoshizora no doraibu" and "Cosmic Hippie". In 1995, they released their first single "Gokigenikaga?" and made their major label debut.

Maruyama Harushige later joined the band. They released the albums "Wakamonotachi", "Tokyo", "Ai-to-warai-no-yoru" and "Sunny Day Service." In 1999, they toured Japan with The Trash Can Sinatras.

The band disbanded in 2000, but Keiichi continued to make music as a solo artist.

In 2008, the band reunited.

On July 15, 2018, it was announced that the band's drummer, Harushige Maruyama, had died in May of that year.

== Discography ==
=== Albums ===
- 1995 - Wakamono Tachi
- 1996 - Tokyo
- 1997 - Ai to Warai no Yoru (Nights of Love and Laughter)
- 1997 - Sunny Day Service
- 1998 - 24 Ji
- 1999 - Mugen
- 2000 - Love Album
- 2010 - Honjitsuwa seitenari
- 2014 - Sunny
- 2015 - Birth of a Kiss
- 2016 - Dance to You
- 2017 - Popcorn Ballads
- 2018 - the CITY
- 2019 - the SEA
- 2020 - Iine!
- 2022 - Doki Doki
- 2025 - Sunny Beat

=== Compilations ===
- 2001 - Extra Best
- 2001 - Complete Best
