= Mitsuyoshi Azuma & The Swinging Boppers =

Japanese jump blues band

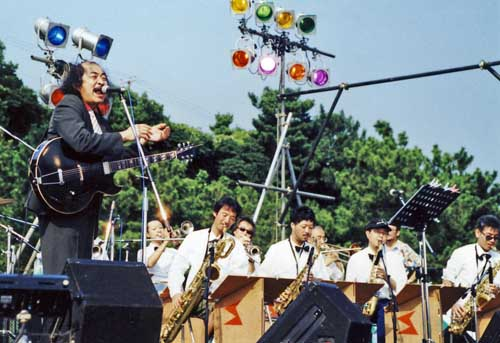
- Mitsuyoshi Azuma & The Swinging Boppers at Honmoku Jazz Festival, 2001.

Background information
- Origin: Shinjuku, Tokyo, Japan
- Genres: Blues, jump blues, swing
- Years active: 1979–present
- Labels: Deadball, Victor Entertainment, Hot River, Sony Music Associated
- Members: Mitsuyoshi Azuma; Yutaka Maki; Akihiro Okachi; Shio Hayasaki; Yoshimasa Tomita; Naoya Kon; Shigeo Natori; Taisuke Nishijima; Sampeig Yamaguchi; Toru Odajima; Kozo Watanabe; Bunji Nishikawa
- Past members: Konosuke Horie; Hiroshi Ishida; Hiroshi Kikuchi; Masahiro Itoi
- Website: www.sonymusic.co.jp/Music/Info/Boppers/special_190522

Mitsuyoshi Azuma & The Swinging Boppers, Mitsuyoshi Azuma & The Swinging Boppers (吾妻光良 & The Swinging Boppers) is a Japanese jump blues band led by guitarist Mitsuyoshi Azuma.

== History ==
The start of the group goes back to the fall of 1979, when Mitsuyoshi Azuma (b. February 29, 1956), a student at Faculty of Science & Engineering of Waseda University organized a big band concert with his friends at Modern Jazz Society as a memory-making event before the college graduation. This group was meant to break up at the time of graduation, but it was so much fun for them, they decided to reunite nine months later. From then on, they started playing sporadically.

In 1983, the group released its debut album "Swing Back with the Swinging Bopers". The album consisted of covers of blues and jazz all sung in English, but one song "Que Pasa Chica" was also recorded with Japanese lyrics and it was released as a single under the name of "Oi Kora Ojochan (おいこらお嬢ちゃん)", which was added as a bonus track when the album was later released on CD.

In 1988, they released their second album "Hepcats Jump Again". This album featured uniquely humorous original songs in Japanese such as "Gokuraku Papa (極楽パパ)" and "Gomi no Hi Kuru Made (ゴミの日来るまで)". On this album, the alto saxophonist, Kozo Watanabe made a debut as a vocalist exchanging vocal duties with Azuma on the latter track. After the release of this album, the pianist Konosuke Horie left the group, and Shio Hayasaki, a pianist of blues band Roller Coaster joined to replace him.

In 1991, the group signed with major record company Victor Entertainment and released their third album "Stompin’ & Bouncin’". The album featured more 8 out of 10 songs sung in Japanese which was more than the previous album. The last track "Honjane (ほんじゃね)" meaning "farewell" is a tribute to their former pianist Horie.

The group’s playing continued to be very slow and sporadic after they signed with Victor, with live shows happening only about four times a year, and it took 11 years before releasing their next album.

In 2002, after a long silence, the group finally released their new album "Squeezin’ & Blowin’". Many of the songs on it such as "Yappari Niku Wo Kuou (やっぱり肉を喰おう)", "Kariage Mama (刈り上げママ)" were already known to their fans through live shows before the release of the album. "Yappari Niku Wo Kuou” which means “let’s eat meat” originally had a line that said "let’s catch more whales to eat" but Victor claimed it as a problem, and it was changed to "I’d like to have you, too". After this release, the group started to play more dates and they started to do more shows outside of Tokyo area.

In 2006, they released their fifth album entitled "Seven & Bi-decade". The title means "27 years" which were the years passed since the start of the group at the time of this release. The group's third album and thereafter all bear titles that are abbreviated to "S.B." which is also an acronym for "Swinging Boppers".

This album did not include some of the songs that had been played live and had been expected to be on the album. One of them was "Did You See Jackie Robinson Hit That Ball?" a song originally done by Count Basie Orchestra. Azuma wrote an original Japanese lyrics to it about a historic Sumo Wrestling match by Tochiazuma and titled it "栃東の取り組み見たか (Tochiazuma No Torikumi Mitaka)" and it was one of the fan favorites at the concerts, but it was not included because they received no reply to the permission request to the copyright holders of the original song about releasing it with new lyrics. It was finally released on the 2013 album "Senior Bacchanals" with some lyric changes.

In 2007, the A&R man in charge of group at Victor Entertainment retired from the company and the group moved to Yukawa's newly established label Hot River Records.

On September 22 and 23 of that year, the group did concerts at Tokyo Cinema Club in Uguisudani, Tokyo. This marked their first shows in two consecutive days. The shows were recorded and filmed, and in January 2009, live CD "Sweatin' Ballroom - Jumpin' At The Cuckoo Valley" was released, followed by DVD "Stage & Backdoor - Jumpin' At The Cuckoo Valley" in June of the same year.

The group celebrated its 30th year in 2009, and toured Tokyo, Nagoya and Osaka playing at Club Quattro in each of those cities.

== Overview ==
- Mitsuyoshi Azuma, the leader of the group is an established music writer. He started to write a column in the Player magazine in 1977 about slide guitars which would later become the column "Blues Guitar Koza (ぶる〜すギター高座)"
  - After Azuma graduated from college, he started to work for Nippon Television (NTV) starting as a sound engineer. He later became the CEO for its subsidiary NTV Technical Resources Inc. and also the Managing Director for the NTV itself. In 2014, he became the CEO for Forecast Communications, and from 2016 to 2020 President & CEO of Nippon Digital Broadcasting Systems.
  - Azuma's older brother is George Azuma, also a guitarist and the founder of guitar builder Killer Guitars. They both graduated Azabu High School in Tokyo.
  - Azuma started playing guitar when he was in the second grade.。
- Most of the members of the group had regular jobs apart from the music activities, and the group called themselves "an amateur group". Because of this fact, in the past shows, some of the group members had to be absent in some cases due to their jobs with substitute players filling in.

== Discography ==
=== Album ===
No.	Release date	Title	Label
1st	1983 (Mar. 5)	"Swing Back With The Swinging' Boppers"	Deadball
2nd	1988 (Apr. 25)	"Hepcats Jump Again"	Deadball
3rd	1991 (Oct. 21)	"Stompin' & Bouncin' – The Great Victor Masters 1990-1991"	Victor
4th	2002 (Feb. 21)	"Squeezin' & Blowin'"	Victor
5th	2006 (Aug. 23)	"Seven & Bi-decade"	Victor
6th	2009 (Jan. 18)	"Sweatin' Ballroom - Jumpin' At The Cuckoo Valley"	Hot River
7th	2013 (Sep. 21)	"Senior Bacchanals"	Hot River
8th	2019 (May 22)	"Scheduled by the Budget"	Sony Music Associated
9th	2024 (Nov. 20)	"Sustainable Banquet"	SMDR Aldelight

=== Single ===
- 1983 "Oi Kora Ojochan (おいこらお嬢ちゃん)" b/w "Strollin' with Bones" (Deadball)
- 2020 "Big Bug Boogie" b/w "Gokigen Memori (ご機嫌目盛り)"

=== DVD ===
- 2009 "Stage & Backdoor - Jumpin' At The Cuckoo Valley" (Hot River)
