= GaGaGa SP =

Japanese punk band

- Origin: Kobe, Japan
- Genres: Punk rock, pop punk
- Years active: 1997–present
- Labels: MASTERSIX FOUNDATION (2001 - 2006), I like record (2007 - present)
- Members: Kozak Maeda; Satoshi Yamamoto; Satoru Tajima
- Past members: Hideki Fujiwara; Kei Tsuname; Yasunobu Kuwahara
- Website: Official website

GaGaGa SP (Japanese: ガガガSP, also referred to as GAGAGA or TaTaTa) are a Japanese punk band from Kobe, Japan.

GaGaGa SP's music has reached a large audience in North America due to their songs being used in popular anime such as Sgt. Frog (Japanese: Keroro Gunso) and Naruto. However, probably due to lack of information and the language barrier, the band itself is not widely known outside Japan. In 2020, Jonathan McNamara of The Japan Times listed the compilation Best Album (2007) as one of the 10 Japanese albums worthy of inclusion in Rolling Stone's 2020 list of the 500 greatest albums of all time, writing that the songs "Senkou Hanabi” and “Hajimete Kimi to Shabetta” are "anthems of an earnest youth, as applicable in Kansai as they are the world over".

Yasunobu Kuwahara died on 5 February 2025 from heart failure.

== Discography ==
Studio Albums

- Gagaga appeared SP (Jan 25, 2001)
- Yearbook (Mar 6, 2002)
- §いち went through Ola (Mar 5, 2003)
- Mobilization irresponsible family (Mar 9, 2005)
- 狂 age youth (May 17, 2006)
- SP Gagaga Best Album (Apr 25, 2007)
- Shame and voice (Feb 5, 2008)
- Love me! Give me money!! Give me freedom! (May 12, 2009)
- Is FOLK PUNK (April 13, 2010)
- Collection feat genius like me (Mar 15, 2011)
- Everyday anarchism (Jan 15, 2013)
