= Group inou =

Japanese electronic and hip-hop duo

group_inou (グループイノウ)
- Origin: Japan
- Genres: Alternative hip hop, experimental hip hop, electronic
- Years active: 2003–present
- Label: GAL
- Members: cp; imai
- Website: g-a-l.jp/group_inou/

group_inou (グループイノウ) is a Japanese electronic and hip-hop duo formed in 2003. Since 2006 they have released music under their own independent record label GAL. The group went on indefinite hiatus in 2016, returning without announcement in late 2023 with a new song.

== Members ==
imai (いまい)

The composer of the duo's music. He also performs as a solo artist under the same name.

cp (しーぴー)

The group's rapper. He is also the guitarist and vocalist for the post-hardcore band uri gagarn.

== Discography ==
=== Albums ===
1. FAN (2008-04-09)
2. _ (pronounced "underbar") (2010-06-02)
3. DAY (2012-10-10)
4. MAP (2015-07-01)

=== EPs ===
1. foods (September 27, 2006)
2. ESCORT (April 22, 2009)
3. HAPPY (January 1, 2024)

=== Singles ===
1. BPA (March 22, 2006)
2. HEART (March 16, 2011)
3. HALF (August 21, 2011)
4. MONKEY / JUDGE (April 4, 2012)
5. MANSION (October 10, 2013)
6. THERAPY (Pasocom Music Club Remix) (May 29, 2020)
7. HAPPENING (November 26th, 2023)

=== Remix albums ===
1. System Kitchen (January 17, 2007)

=== Compilations ===
1. foods & System Kitchen (2015-04-01)

=== Live videos ===
1. one camera no cut (DVD, March 22, 2006)
2. SET (DVD, November 27, 2013)

== In popular culture ==
From April to June 2012, their song "JUDGE" was used as the ending theme for the TV Tokyo series Moya-Moya Summers 2. From October to December of the same year, the song "9" appeared as the ending theme of the TV Tokyo variety show God Tan ~The God Tongue.
