= Inushiki =

Japanese band

- Origin: Tokyo, Japan
- Genres: Reggae, Rock, Funk
- Years active: 1998 - 2010, 2017-now
- Label: Provincia Records
- Past members: Yohei Miyake; Seitaro Mine; Shoji Ishiguro; Kazunari Kakinuma
- Website: www.inushiki.com

Inushiki (犬式 a.k.a. Dogggystyle) is a Japanese band, formed in Tokyo, Japan in 1998. The band's members are vocalist Yohei Miyake, guitarist Seitaro Mine, bassist Shoji Ishiguro, and drummer Kazunari Kakinuma. Inushiki is noted for its blend of reggae, rock, and funk as well as its revolutionary politics and lyrics. The group's music is distinguished primarily by Yohei's lyrical poetry and band's synergy. Inushiki are founding members of National School Band Associates (NBSA), with collaborate often with NBSA affiliate artists such as Bagdad Cafe, Soil and Pimp Sessions, as well as local Kichijōji-based artist Latyr Sy.
After Yohei's political career was finished the band got together again in 2017 releasing a 5 tracks new album in 2022 (Animalize Yourself) and restarting the Japan Tours.

== Discography ==
- Inushiki EP (犬式) (2002)
- Flying Fish EP (飛魚) (2002)
- Reggae Midori EP (レゲミドリ) (2003)
- Month Peach Disco EP (月桃ディスコ) (2004)
- Life is Beatfull (2005)
- Diego Express (2007)
- Animalize Yourself (2022)
