= Ino Hidefumi =

Japanese musician

- Born: July 26, 1970 (age 55)
- Origin: Miyazaki, Japan
- Genres: Electronica, rock
- Occupation(s): Musician, composer
- Instrument(s): Piano, melodica, organ
- Labels: Innocent Record

Ino Hidefumi (猪野 秀史, Ino Hidefumi; born July 26, 1970) is a Japanese jazz, and electronic musician. He releases his music solely on Innocent Record, a label he created with the concept of "One label, one artist.”

== Early life ==
Ino was born in Nobeoka, Miyazaki Prefecture, Japan in 1970. He began to learn the piano around age 5 when his mother took him to a piano class on the pretext of going to a local sweet shop. During his time in secondary school at Totoro Junior High in Nobeoka, he specialised in brass instruments in the school's symphonic band. After graduating from Kobayashi Prefectural High School in Nobeoka he took two years out, during which he spent attending a university preparatory school in Fukuoka and frequenting the cinemas and second hand records shops. For a time Ino also attended a vocational school for piano tuners. Whilst working at various in places in Fukuoka such as offices, a clothes shop, and food stalls & coffee shops in Nagahama, he created a band dedicated to 60s music in which he took on vocals as well as playing keyboard.

In his mid twenties Ino begun to start [started] professionally producing music on his own. At 30 years old he headed up to Tokyo with no guarantees of employment. In an interview he commented, "Though working as a salary-man in Fukuoka was comfortable, it wasn't what I wanted to do nor the way I truly wanted to live my life." He took all the music he had ever created to a record company but was turned away. On May 1, 2002 in Ni-Chome, Ebisu, Tokyo Ino founded Cafe Tenement and "innocent record", which he made his base from which to broadcast his music to the world.

== Innocent record ==
On December 24, 2004 Ino set up an "innocent record" music label to release his music, under the concept of "One Label, One Artist." The label name came from a pun created by Yasuharu Konishi, at that time a frequent customer of Tenement, who commented that in French "Ino-san" sounded like "innocent." The same year Ino released a vinyl of music based on melodies made using a rhodes piano. Since then, all of his singles to date have been released as part of a vinyl series. In 2006 he released his first album, "Satisfaction." In October 2012 Ino released his fourth album, entitled "KALEIDOSCOPIC." Several of his records have charted on Oricon, with The Force of Exotic peaking at number 70.

== Live performances ==
Though Ino creates all of his music part by part using step recording followed by a mixdown process, for his performances he reproduces all of the music live*. As part of his "INO Hidefumi LIVE SET" national tour, he performs at open-air festivals and other various events.

== Discography ==
=== Albums ===
- Satisfaction(2006)
- Living Message(2008)
- INOCOLOGY(2009)
- KALEIDOSCOPIC(2010)
- New Morning(2013)
- SONG ALBUM(2018)

=== EP ===
- The Force of Exotic(2007)

=== Vinyl ===
- Billie Jean(2005)
- Spartacus(2005)
- Pillow Talk(2005)
- Solid Foundation(2006)
- +2°C(2007)
- Serendipity(2008)
- Suicide Is Painless(2008)

=== DVD ===
- Ino Hidefumi Live Set(2008)
