= Bonobo (2018 film) =

- Directed by: Zoel Aeschbacher
- Written by: Zoel Aeschbacher
- Produced by: Yasmine Abd El Aziz; Lionel Baier; François Morisset
- Starring: Benjamin Sanou; Paul Minthe; Nicole Mersey
- Cinematography: Dino Berguglia
- Edited by: Youri Tchao Debats
- Production companies: Nouvelle Tribu; ECAL; Salaud Morisset
- Distributed by: Salaud Morisset
- Release date: February 18, 2018
- Running time: 16 minutes
- Country: Switzerland

Bonobo is a 2018 Swiss short film directed by Swiss director Zoel Aeschbacher as a graduation film for his directing studies at the ECAL. The film premiered at 2018 Clermont-Ferrand International Short Film Festival where it won the Audience Award. It has been selected and awarded at several film festivals including Palm Springs International Film Festival and the Brooklyn Film Festival where it won the Best Short Film Spirit Award. In September 2019 the film received the Oscar Qualifying Gold Medal for "Best Narrative" (International) at the Student Academy Awards.

== Plot ==
When the elevator of their public housing breaks down, the fates of Felix, a disabled pensioner, Ana, a single mother struggling with her move and Seydou, a young man passionate about dance intertwine towards an explosive ending where their limits will be tested.

== Awards ==
Since its launch, the film has received numerous awards around the world.

| Year | Presenter/Festival | Award/Category | Status |
|---|---|---|---|
| 2018 | Clermont-Ferrand Film Festival | Competition (Audience Award) | Won |
| 2018 | Brooklyn Film Festival | Best Short Film Spirit Award | Won |
| 2018 | Les Arcs Film Festival | Competition (Special Mention of the Jury) | Won |
| 2018 | Melbourne International Film Festival | Cinema Nova Award for Best Fiction Short Film | Won |
| 2018 | Palm Springs International Film Festival | Official Competition | Nominated |
| 2018 | Brussels Short Film Festival | International Competition | Nominated |
| 2019 | Student Academy Awards | Best Narrative (International) | Won |
| 2019 | Braunschweig International Film Festival | Official Selection | Nominated |
