= The fin. =

Japanese indie rock band

- Origin: Kobe, Hyogo Prefecture, Japan .
- Genres: indie rock; synth-pop; chillwave; dream pop
- Years active: 2012–present
- Labels: Hip Land Group (2014-present), Lost In The Manor (2015-2016)
- Members: Yuto Uchino; Kaoru Nakazawa
- Past members: Ryosuke Odagaki; Takayasu Taguchi
- Website: thefin.jp

The fin. is a 2-piece indie rock band from Kobe, Japan, currently consisting of lead vocalist Yuto Uchino and bassist/former drummer Kaoru Nakazawa. Uchino and Nakazawa started the band in 2012 with guitarist Ryosuke Odagaki and original bassist Takayasu Taguchi, and released their first song "Faded Light" on SoundCloud in November of the same year.

The band's style has been described as a blend of synth-pop and shoegaze from the 80's-90's with nowadays American indie-pop and chillwave.

== History ==
In 2015, The fin. performed at SXSW in Austin, Texas, as part of the Japan Nite showcase, which was their first opportunity to play outside Japan and began their first U.S. tour. Later in the same year, they continued on to their first UK tour, supporting their debut EP Night Time, followed by their relocation to London in September 2016.

Former bassist Taguchi left the band in May 2017, leading drummer Kaoru to take over the position as a bass player.

== Albums ==
The band worked on their second album There with Bradley Spence, a producer known for his works with Jamiroquai, Passenger, Alt-J, and Radiohead, and Joe Lambert, a mastering engineer known for works for Beach Fossils, Wild Nothing, Washed Out and Warpaint.

The album was released in Asia in March 2018, followed by a sold-out tour in support of the record.

== Music festivals ==
The band has performed as the supporting act for The Last Shadow Puppets, Circa Waves and MEW, performed at music festivals in Japan as well as embarked on world tours.
