= Unchain =

Japanese rock band

UNCHAIN
- Origin: Kyōtango, Kyoto, Japan
- Genres: Rock, funk, alternative rock, soul, neo soul, post-punk, dance-rock
- Years active: 1996–present
- Labels: Avex, rhythm zone, Tokuma Japan, Style Missile Records
- Members: Masanori Tanigawa; Hiroaki Tani; Shogo Yoshida
- Past members: Masafumi Sato
- Website: virusoul.net/unchain/

Unchain (アンチェイン, Anchein; stylized as UNCHAIN) is a three-piece Japanese rock band formed in Kyōtango, Kyoto, in 1996.

Initially known for their unique alternative rock style, they later developed a pop rock-neo soul style, including funk and dance elements. The band has scored two top-40 hit singles in Japan and their latest original album N.E.W.S. reached No. 1 on alternative rock chart of Oricon, which is equivalent of the Billboard in the United States.

== History ==
Formed in 1996, Unchain initially consisted of junior high classmates Masanori Tanigawa, Hiroaki Tani, and Shogo Yoshida. Masafumi Sato would later join a year later as their junior a year below.

The band would later move to Osaka and were able to steadily get gigs to play at. In 2005, the band made their indie debut with the mini-album the space of the sense. On October of the same year, Unchain made their first appearance on MINAMI WHEEL 2005. The band made their major debut with the album departure.

Masafumi Sato departed from the band on June 18, 2020 following a livestream that was aired in place of the planned 24years "BEST" Tour. The tour was cancelled due to the COVID-19 pandemic. Sato announced plans to depart from the band on November 18, 2019 however.

== Members ==
Current members

- Masanori Tanigawa (谷川正憲) – lead vocals, guitar
- Hiroaki Tani (谷浩彰) – bass guitar, backing vocals
- Shogo Yoshida (吉田昇吾) – drums

Former members

- Masafumi Sato (佐藤将文) – lead guitar, backing vocals (1997-2020)

=== Timeline ===
Yoshida is also an active member for the band Ivory7 Chord.
