= Never young beach =

Japanese indie rock band

never young beach
- Origin: Tokyo, Japan
- Genres: Indie rock; alternative rock; new wave
- Years active: 2014–present
- Labels: Victor Entertainment; Roman Label; Boyon Production
- Members: Yuma Abe; Keigo Tatsumi; Kento Suzuki
- Past members: Kou Matsushima; Satoshi Anan
- Website: neveryoungbeach.jp

never young beach (ネバーヤングビーチ, nebā yangu bīchi) is a Japanese indie rock band from Tokyo. Founded in 2014, the band consists of lead singer, guitarist, and primary songwriter Yuma Abe, bassist Keigo Tatsumi, and drummer Kento Suzuki.

== Discography ==
- YASHINOKI HOUSE (2015)
- fam fam (2016)
- A GOOD TIME (2017)
- STORY (2019)
- Arigatou (2023)
