= Heavenstamp =

Japanese band

- Origin: Japan
- Genres: Alternative rock
- Years active: 2009-
- Labels: Warner Music Japan, Goldtone Records
- Members: Sally#Cinnamon (vocals, guitar); Tomoya.S (guitar); Shikichin (bass); Miki Otake (drums)
- Website: Official website (in Japanese)

Heavenstamp is a Japanese alternative rock band formed in 2009 by members Sally#Cinnamon, Tomoya.S, Shikichin, and Miki Otake, all of whom were previously members of separate bands.

== History ==
Heavenstamp debuted with "Hype - E.P. + REMIXES" under record label Goldtone Records. The band is currently signed to Warner Music Japan. On October 5, 2011, they released their 3rd single titled "Waterfall - E.P. + REMIXES".

== Discography ==
EP

- Hype - E.P. + REMIXES (December 8, 2010)
- Stand by you - E.P. + REMIXES (May 11, 2011)
- Waterfall - E.P. + REMIXES (October 5, 2011)
- Decadence-E.P.+REMIXES (March 28, 2012)
