= Flower Companyz =

Japanese rock band

- Origin: Nagoya, Japan
- Genres: Rock
- Years active: 1989–present
- Labels: Antinos Records (1995-2001); Curry Rice Records (2001-2002); Trash Records (2002-2006); Highline Records (2007); Sony Music Associated Records (2008-present)
- Members: Keisuke Suzuki; Great Maekawa; Kennichi Takeyasu; Mr. Konishi
- Website: flowercompanyz.com

Flower Companyz is a Japanese rock band from Nagoya, Aichi. The band has released 15 original studio albums and 6 compilation albums since their formation in 1989. Their most recent album, Stayin' Alive, was released on January 21, 2015.

== Members ==
- Keisuke Suzuki - vocals
- Great Maekawa - bass guitar
- Kennichi Takeyasu - lead guitar
- Mr. Konishi - drums

== Discography ==
=== Studio albums ===
- Frakan no Fake de Iko (1995)
- Frakan no My Blue Heaven (1996)
- Oretachi Hatachizoku (1996)
- Mammoth Flower (1998)
- Prunes & Custard (1999)
- Ikari no Bongo (2000)
- Hakitaku Naruhodo Aisaretai (2002)
- Hatsunetsu no Otoko (2003)
- Tokyo Tower (2003)
- Setagaya Yoakemae (2004)
- Nounai Hyakkei (2006)
- Tmashii ni Yoroshiku (2008)
- Chest! Chest! Chest! (2010)
- Happy End (2012)
- Stayin' Alive (2015)
