= The Pees =

Japanese three-piece rock band

- Origin: Japan
- Genres: Punk rock, post-punk
- Years active: 1986–1997, 2002–present
- Labels: King
- Members: Haruyuki Oki; Yoshikazu Abiko; Shinichiro Sato
- Past members: Masuhiro Goto (1986 - 1989, Dr.); Uganda (1990 -1993, Dr.); Takehiko Yoshida (1996 -1997 Dr.); Kogoro Tsuchida (1996 -1997, Guitar); Koichi Ishihara (1996, Dr.); Akihiro Yoshida (1996 - 1997 Dr.)

The Pees (The ピーズ, za pīzu) are a Japanese three-piece rock band. Formed in 1986 by college students based in Tokyo, they have 11 original albums and continue to tour Japan. They once left the music scene but returned in July 2002 after a five-year absence. The current members are:

- Haru (Haruyuki Oki), (Lead vocals & Bass)
- Abi san (Yoshikazu Abiko), (Guitar)
- Shin chan (Shinichiro Sato), (Drums)

Recently they participated in a tribute album for another Japanese rock band the pillows, with which they have strong ties. They played one song from the pillows' second album 90's My Life. They played the pillows' Pari no Josei Mary in the tribute album, Synchronized Rockers.

Their latest drummer, who is touring with them for summer of 2005, is Sato Shinichirou, none other than the drummer for the pillows. He has been drumming with them for the past few years as a side project.

== Discography ==
Main albums

| # | Information |
|---|---|
| 1st | The Greatest Hits VOL. 1: Released: November 21, 1989; Label: Victor |
| 2nd | The Greatest Hits VOL. 2: Released: November 21, 1989; Label: Victor |
| 3rd | Masukaki Zaru: Released: September 21, 1990; Label: Victor |
| 4th | Kuzu n natte GO: Released: 1991; Label: Victor |
| 5th | Todome wo Hade ni Kure: Released: 1993; Label: Victor |
| 6th | Doko e mo Kaeranai: Released: 1996; Label: King |
| 7th | Rihabiri Chudan: Released: 1997; Label: King |
| 8th | The Pees: Released: 2003; Label: King |
| 9th | Anti-Glider: Released: 2004; Label: King |
| 10th | Akabane 39: Released: 2005; Label: King |
| 11th | Al Kinema: Released: 2012; Label: Indies |

Best albums

- Butchie Mary 1989‐1997 Selection Side A, 1991
- Butchie Mary 1989‐1997 Selection Side B, 1991

Others

- O.P.King, July 30, 2003
- Synchronized Rockers, September 9, 2004
