= Leyona =

Background information
- Born: August 31, 1977 (age 48)
- Origin: Mihara, Japan
- Occupations: Singer, songwriter
- Years active: 1999–present
- Labels: Sony Music Entertainment Japan 1999–2004; Victor Entertainment 2004–2008; Cutting Edge 2008–present
- Website: leyona.info

Leyona (Japanese: 玲葉奈, Hepburn: Reiyōna; born August 31, 1977) is a Japanese singer and songwriter from Mihara city in Hiroshima Prefecture. She presently belongs to Cutting Edge.

== Discography ==
=== Singles ===
- Orange (1999)
- Beat Goes On and The (1999)
- Town to Town (2000)
- One Blood (import) (2000)
- Kaze o Atsumete (風をあつめて) (2001).
- Travellin 'man (2001)
- Free wave/Joy to the World (2002)
- Hikarinouta (ひかりのうた) (2003).
- 500-mile/Love (2003)
- Try to Fly (2004)
- New world (新世界) (2005)
- Thank You (2006)
- Rainy Blue with Latyr Sy (2006)

=== Albums ===
- One Blood (2000)
- Niji (2002)
- Sun Road (2003)
- Leyona's Greatest Groovin' (2004)
- Nu World (2005)
- SPICE! (2005)
- Clappin' (2006)
- Rollin' and Tumblin' (2007)
- Off The Lip (2007)
- Patchwork (2010)
