= Bonobos (band) =

Japanese dub band

- Origin: Osaka, Japan
- Genres: Indie pop, rock, J-pop
- Years active: 2001-2023
- Label: Teenage Symphone/Dreamusic
- Members: Chunho Sai; Natsuko Morimoto; Ryuhei Koike; Yuji Tanaka; Hirowatari Uemoto
- Website: bonobos.jp

Bonobos was a Japanese band from Osaka that was formed in August 2001. Its final lineup consisted of Chunho Sai (guitar, vocals), Ryuhei Koike (lead guitar), Natsuko Morimoto (bass), Hironobu Uemoto (drums) and Yuji Tanaka (keyboards). The band released its first full-length album Hover Hover in 2004.

In 2022 the band announced that it would disband one year later in spring 2023. The band officially disbanded in March 2023 after performing two farewell performances in Osaka and Tokyo.

== Members ==
=== Current members ===
- Chunho Sai – lead vocals, guitar (2001–2023)
- Natsuko Morimoto – bass (2001–2023)
- Ryuhei Koike – lead guitar (2015–2023)
- Yuji Tanaka – keyboards (2015–2023)
- Hirowatari Umemoto – drums (2015–2023)

=== Former Members ===
- Yasuyuki "Kojiro" Sasaki – lead guitar (2001-2008)
- Izumi Matsui – percussion (2001-2010)
- Bondo Tsuji – drums (2001-2015)

== Discography ==
=== Albums ===
- Hover Hover (2004)
- Electlyric (2005)
- あ，うん (a, un) (2006)
- オリハルコン日和 (2009)
- Ultra (2011)
- Hyper Folk (2014)
- 23区 (2016)
- .jp (2022)

=== Extended plays ===
- Golden Days (2005)
- FOLK CITY FOLK.ep (2017)

=== Compilations ===
- Pastrama – The Best of Bonobos (January 30, 2008)

=== Singles ===
- "Mojiki Fuyu ga Kuru"
- "Water"
- "Ano Kotoba, Ano Hikari"
- "Konnya-wa Groove Me"
- "Thank You for the Music"
- "Beautiful"
- "Standing There ~Ima, Soko ni Ikuyo~"
- "Arpeggio"

== See also ==
- 2001 in music
- List of dub artists
- List of Japanese musicians
