= Abnormalize =

2012 single by Ling Tosite Sigure

Single by Ling Tosite Sigure

from the album I'mperfect
- Language: Japanese; English
- B-side: "Make Up Syndrome"
- Released: November 14, 2012
- Studio: Tuppance House I's Studio; Studio 4
- Genre: Post-hardcore; alternative rock; emo; anime song
- Length: 3:37
- Label: Sony Music Associated Records
- Songwriter: Toru Kitajima
- Producer: Toru Kitajima

Ling Tosite Sigure singles chronology
"Moment a Rhythm" (2008)	"Abnormalize" (2012)	"Enigmatic Feeling" (2014)

Alternative cover
- Limited edition cover

Music video
- "Abnormalize" on YouTube

"Abnormalize" (stylized in all lowercase) is a song by Japanese rock band Ling Tosite Sigure. Released as a single on November 14, 2012, through Sony Music Associated Records, it served as the opening theme for the first season of the Japanese anime series Psycho-Pass. It was the first and only single released for their fifth studio album I'mperfect.

== Background and release ==
On September 4, 2012, it was announced that a new song by Ling Tosite Sigure would be revealed during livestreams on YouTube and Ustream (now IBM Watson Media) on September 7, which wound up being "Abnormalize". The CD single was scheduled for release on November 14 in two versions: a standard edition including the B-side "Make Up Syndrome", and a limited edition containing a DVD with the title track's music video. On September 14, it was announced that the song would serve as the opening theme for the anime series Psycho-Pass, scheduled to air on October 11. Vocalist and guitarist TK commented:

We are incredibly honored that this is our first collaboration. Thank you. I wanted to step into the abnormal, plastic world depicted by the psychopath. What is visible, what is invisible, what should not be seen. In a world where truth, secrets, and falsehoods are intertwined, I was lost as to what I should be focusing on. As I stood at this entrance, strangely, the music began to play immediately. With its delicate yet intense sound of loneliness as the opening, I hope this work will reach many people. I am very much looking forward to its completion.

— Toru Kitajima, Natalie

For a one-day event on October 12, the track was split into five 43-second ringtones available to download on the digital music distribution website RecoChoku. Downloading all versions revealed the full song, as well as granted a wallpaper featuring the single's cover art. Three other ringtone versions were available to download the following day: a chorus version, an intro version, and a final chorus guitar solo version.

On October 22, the song was played in its entirety for the first time on the Japanese radio program School of Lock! The following day, a special website was published to promote the single, which contained a demo version, music video, and behind-the-scenes photos.

"Abnormalize" marked Ling Tosite Sigure's second single release under Sony Music Japan and their first since their third studio album Still a Sigure Virgin? in 2010.

== Composition and lyrics ==
"Abnormalize" is a post-hardcore and alternative rock song, composed in the key of B-flat major and is set in time signature of common time with a tempo of 87 BPM. It was written, arranged, produced, and composed by TK.

TK entrusted the mixing process to engineer Tohru Takayama as a way to expand their sound. He stated, "I wanted someone to cook it up from a different angle. I think whether we can properly incorporate the sound that someone else has touched into our own form depends on how clearly we can see the sound we want to create".

TK began writing the song shortly after looking at the series's promotional illustrations and story summary. The tentative title of the song was "Plastic", with both tracks mentioning "plastic" prominently. When asked about his description of Psycho-Pass's setting as a "plastic world", TK commented as follows:

It's like, it has this artificial, fake feel to it, it's fragile, easily broken, but... it's such a convenient thing that we still use it a lot. I also think, 'Plastic must be made from nothing,' and it can take on any shape, right? That's the impression I get; it's hard to put into words precisely. In this anime, the cityscape is entirely depicted as holograms, and there's a connection to the image of it being fake, easily broken, or actually nothing at all.

— Toru Kitajima, Billboard Japan

== Cover version ==
- A cover by fictional band Afterglow (Ran Mitake, voiced by Ayane Sakura) was added to the mobile game BanG Dream! Girls Band Party! on September 12, 2022, serving as a tie-in with TK. It was later included on the CD for BanG Dream! Girls Band Party! Cover Collection Vol.7 on December 14.

== Track listing ==
All tracks are written by Toru Kitajima.

CD / digital download / streaming – standard edition
No.	Title	Length
1.	"Abnormalize"	3:37
2.	"Make Up Syndrome"	4:03
Total length:		7:40

CD – limited edition
No.	Title	Length
1.	"Abnormalize"	3:37
2.	"Make Up Syndrome"	4:03
3.	"Abnormalize" (TV edit)	1:29
Total length:		9:09

DVD – limited edition
No.	Title	Length
1.	"Abnormalize" (music video)	3:47
2.	"Psycho-Pass non-credit opening movie"	1:32
Total length:		5:19

== Credits and personnel ==
Credits adapted from the liner notes.

- Toru Kitajima – vocals, guitar, composer, arranger, songwriter, producer, recording engineer
- Masatoshi Nakano / Pierre Nakano – drums
- Miyoko Nakamura / 345 – bass
- Fumiaki Unehara – recording engineer
- Tohru Takayama – mixing engineer (track 1)
- Yasuhisa Kataoka – mixing engineer (track 2)
- Tim Young – mastering engineer

== Charts ==
=== Weekly charts ===
Weekly chart performance for "Abnormalize"
Chart (2012-2013)	Peak position
Japan Hot 100 (Billboard)	13
Japan Hot Animation (Billboard Japan)	2
Japan (Oricon)	8

== Certifications and sales ==
Region	Certification	Certified units/sales
Japan (RIAJ) Digital	Gold	100,000^{*}
^{*} Sales figures based on certification alone.
