= Gravity (disambiguation) =

Gravity, or gravitation, is the mass-proportionate mutual attraction between all things that have mass.

Gravity may also refer to:

== Arts and entertainment ==
=== Film and television ===
- Gravity (2009 film), a German crime film
- Gravity (2013 film), a British-American science fiction thriller film
- Gravity (TV series), a 2010 American comedy-drama series
- "Gravity" (Star Trek: Voyager), a television episode
- "Gravity", a Series G episode of the television series QI (2010)

=== Games ===
- Gravity (video game), a 1990 action-strategy computer game
- Professor Heinz Wolff's Gravity, a 2008 physics-based video game

=== Music ===
==== Albums ====
- Gravity (Alejandro Escovedo album) or the title song, 1992
- Gravity (Big & Rich album) or the title song, 2014
- Gravity (Bullet for My Valentine album) or the title song, 2018
- Gravity (Bush Babees album) or the title song, 1996
- Gravity (Crashcarburn album) or the title song, 2012
- Gravity (Fred Frith album), 1980
- Gravity (Gryffin album), 2019
- Gravity (James Brown album) or the title song (see below), 1986
- Gravity (Jesse Cook album) or the title song, 1996
- Gravity (Kenny G album) or the title song, 1985
- Gravity (Lecrae album) or the title song, 2012
- Gravity (Onewe album) or the title song, 2023
- Gravity (Our Lady Peace album), 2002
- Gravity (Out of the Grey album) or the title song, 1995
- Gravity (Starkill album), 2019
- Gravity (Westlife album), 2010
- Gravity!!!, by Howard Johnson, 1996
- Gravity: Original Motion Picture Soundtrack, from the 2013 film
- Gravity, by Anekdoten, 2003
- Gravity, by D-Side, 2005
- Gravity, by Fly to the Sky, 2004
- Gravity, by Praying Mantis, 2018
- Gravity, by Seven Story Drop, 2005
- Gravity, an EP by Against the Current, 2015

==== Songs ====
- "Gravity" (Brent Faiyaz and DJ Dahi song), 2021
- "Gravity" (DJ Fresh song), 2015
- "Gravity" (Embrace song), 2004
- "Gravity" (Hazbin Hotel song), 2025
- "Gravity" (James Brown song), 1986
- "Gravity" (Jasmine Kara song), 2017
- "Gravity" (John Mayer song), 2006
- "Gravity" (Karry Wang and Jolin Tsai song), 2019
- "Gravity" (Kis-My-Ft2 song), 2016
- "Gravity" (Luna Sea song), 2000
- "Gravity" (Maaya Sakamoto song), 2003
- "Gravity" (Nothing's Carved in Stone song), 2015
- "Gravity" (Papa Roach song), 2015
- "Gravity" (Pixie Lott song), 2010
- "Gravity" (Sara Bareilles song), 2009
- "Gravity" (The Superjesus song), 2000
- "Gravity" (Zlata Ognevich song), 2012
- "Gravity", by ...And You Will Know Us by the Trail of Dead from X: The Godless Void and Other Stories, 2020
- "Gravity", by Aranda from Aranda, 2008
- "Gravity", by Architects from All Our Gods Have Abandoned Us, 2016
- "Gravity", by Audiovent from Dirty Sexy Knights in Paris, 2002
- "Gravity", by Beach Bunny from Emotional Creature, 2022
- "Gravity", by Bic Runga from Beautiful Collision, 2002
- "Gravity", by Blondie from Pollinator, 2017
- "Gravity", by Blue Stahli from Obsidian, 2021
- "Gravity", by Bone Thugs from New Waves, 2017
- "Gravity", by Coldplay from Talk, 2005
- "Gravity", by Conception from In Your Multitude, 1995
- "Gravity", by Daughtry from Cage to Rattle, 2018
- "Gravity", by Dean Brody from Dean Brody, 2009
- "Gravity", by Delirious? from Mezzamorphis, 1999
- "Gravity", by the Dresden Dolls from The Dresden Dolls, 2003
- "Gravity", by Exo from Don't Mess Up My Tempo, 2018
- "Gravity", by Fleshgod Apocalypse from King, 2016
- "Gravity", by Hollywood Undead from Day of the Dead, 2015
- "Gravity", by Hovig, representing Cyprus in the Eurovision Song Contest 2017
- "Gravity", by Hüsker Dü from Everything Falls Apart, 1983
- "Gravity", by In Hearts Wake from Earthwalker, 2014
- "Gravity", by Jamie Woon from Mirrorwriting, 2011
- "Gravity", by Joe Morris from Singularity, 2001
- "Gravity", by Loreen, 2024
- "Gravity", by Max Webster from High Class in Borrowed Shoes, 1977
- "Gravity", by Michael Sembello from the film Cocoon, 1985
- "Gravity", by No Doubt from Push and Shove, 2012
- "Gravity", by Oh My Girl from The Fifth Season, 2019
- "Gravity", by Once Human from Evolution, 2017
- "Gravity", by Pale Waves from Smitten, 2024
- "Gravity", by Paul Weller from True Meanings, 2018
- "Gravity", by a Perfect Circle from Thirteenth Step, 2003
- "Gravity", by Raven-Symoné from the film For One Night, 2006
- "Gravity", by Shawn McDonald from Simply Nothing, 2004
- "Gravity", by Sleep Theory from Afterglow, 2025
- "Gravity", by soulDecision from No One Does It Better, 2000
- "Gravity", by Space from Love You More than Football, 2000
- "Gravity", by Taeyeon from Purpose, 2019
- "Gravity", by Tinashe from BB/Ang3l, 2023
- "Gravity", by Vienna Teng from Waking Hour, 2002
- "Gravity", by Wage War from Deadweight, 2017
- "Gravity", by the Whitest Boy Alive from Rules, 2009
- "Gravity", by YoungBoy Never Broke Again, 2016

=== Other uses in arts and entertainment ===
- Gravitation (M. C. Escher) or Gravity, a 1952 mixed-media artwork by M. C. Escher
- Gravity (character), a Marvel Comics superhero
- Gravity, a 1999 novel by Tess Gerritsen

== Brands and enterprises ==
- Gravity (American company), a content and ad company
- Gravity, British jet suit manufacturer, founded by Richard Browning
- Gravity (Korean company), a South Korean video-game developer
- Gravity Entertainment, an American film and television production company
- Gravity Gaming or Team Gravity, a defunct North American League of Legends team
- Gravity Investments, an American investment services company based in Denver, Colorado
- Gravity Payments, an American payment processor based in Seattle, Washington
- Gravity R&D, a Hungarian IT provider based in Budapest
- Gravity Records, an American record label from San Diego, California
- Gravity Studios, an American recording studio in Chicago, Illinois
- The Gravity Group, an American roller coaster design firm based in Cincinnati, Ohio

== Science and engineering ==
- Gravity (alcoholic beverage), the concentration of ethanol in an alcoholic beverage
- Gravity (software), a program designed to simulate the motions of planetary bodies
- GRAVITY (Very Large Telescope), an instrument at the Very Large Telescope Interferometer
- API gravity, a measure of how heavy or light a petroleum liquid is compared to water
- Specific gravity or relative density, the ratio of the density of a substance to the density of a reference material
- Gravity battery, for energy storage

== Other uses ==
- Gravity (basketball), a concept in basketball
- Gravity, a category of mountain biking where the primary means of movement is gravity, such as Downhill mountain biking
- Gravity, Iowa, U.S., a city
- Gravity (wrestler), Mexican professional wrestler
- Lucid Gravity, an all-electric battery-powered crossover SUV

== See also ==
- Gravidity, in medicine, the number of times a woman has been pregnant
- Gravitas, a quality of substance or depth of personality
- Gravitation (disambiguation)
- Law of Gravity (disambiguation)
- Oh! Gravity., a 2006 album by Switchfoot
