= Psycho-Pass season 1 =

Season of television series

Psycho-Pass
- Season 1
- Cover of the first Psycho-Pass volume released in Japan on December 21, 2012, featuring Akane Tsunemori and Shinya Kogami
- No. of episodes: 22

Release
- Original network: Fuji TV
- Original release: October 12, 2012 – March 22, 2013

Season chronology
- Next → Psycho-Pass 2

Psycho-Pass is a Japanese anime television series produced by Production I.G, directed by Naoyoshi Shiotani and Katsuyuki Motohiro, and written by Gen Urobuchi. It is set in the near future, when it is possible to instantaneously measure a person's "Psycho-Pass": their mental state, personality, and the probability that they will commit a crime. The series follows Akane Tsunemori, a new member of Unit One of the Public Safety Bureau's Criminal Investigation Division, and her involvement in the crimes her group investigates.

It premiered on October 12, 2012, in Fuji TV's Noitamina block, and ended on March 22, 2013, with a total of twenty-two episodes. Toho began releasing the series on DVD and Blu-ray on December 21, 2012, and ended with the eighth volume on July 26, 2013. Each volume included extras such as CD soundtracks and a visual novel. A "new edit" version of the series, dividing the season into 11 episodes with new footage, premiered in Japan in 2014. The fourth episode of the original run was cancelled for unknown reasons, with Shiotani apologizing to the fans.

Funimation has licensed the series in North America and simulcast the series on their website. A home-video version was released on March 11, 2014. In the United Kingdom it is licensed by Manga Entertainment, and in Australia by Madman Entertainment. The series is also available on the streaming service Crunchyroll in English-speaking regions.

It has two opening and closing themes. The opening theme of the first eleven episodes is "Abnormalize" by Ling Tosite Sigure, and the closing theme is "The Monster With No Name" (名前のない怪物, Namae no Nai Kaibutsu) by Egoist. Its opening theme from episode 12 onward is "Out of Control" by Nothing's Carved in Stone, and the closing theme is "All Alone With You" by Egoist.

== Episodes ==
No. overall	No. in season	Title	Directed by	Original release date
1	1	"Crime Coefficient"; Transliteration: "Hanzai Keisū" (Japanese: 犯罪係数)	Naoko Kusumi	October 12, 2012
On her first day as a new inspector in Unit One, Akane Tsunemori is assigned to accompany Enforcers Masaoka and Shinya Kogami: detectives diagnosed by the Sybil System society as criminals due their high Crime Cofficient. Enforcer Shuusei Kagari finds Nobuo Okura, who has kidnapped and raped a woman. Nobuo flees, but is killed by Shinya's advanced Dominator gun. As the woman's Crime Coefficient increases, Shinya tries to kill her but Akane paralyzes him with her weapon. Akane calms the woman down, and Inspector Nobuchika Ginoza paralyzes her.
2	2	"Those Capable"; Transliteration: "Nashi Uru Mono" (Japanese: 成しうる者)	Takayuki Hamana	October 19, 2012
Shinya is hospitalized, recovering from the Dominator-enforced paralysis, and Akane is depressed about her actions. Masaoka teams up with her to investigate a person with a high Crime Coefficient in a shopping mall and, after they return, Akane shares a meal and banters with Shuusei. She later visits Shinya, who reinforces her belief that she made the right call during the hostage situation, and submits her report with no regrets.
3	3	"Rearing Conventions"; Transliteration: "Shiiku no Sahō" (Japanese: 飼育の作法)	Toshiyuki Kono	October 26, 2012
Unit One is called to a drone manufacturing plant to investigate several cases of employee dismemberment by drones. The manager of the plant swears that they are accidents, but Unit One thinks otherwise; they notice a plant worker being bullied by the others. To prevent computer hacking, the plant has been isolated from all electronic networks (including the Sibyl System). Without the system they have no way to identify the killer or use their Dominators, but the Enforcers use other weapons to recover the Dominators and execute the criminal.
4	4	"Nobody Knows Your Mask"; Transliteration: "Dare mo Shiranai Anata no Kamen" (Japanese: 誰も知らないあなたの仮面)	Itsuro Kawasaki	November 2, 2012
Unit One tries to find the killer of a man known online as "Talisman", a popular avatar now controlled by his killer. Akane, with the help of the avatar "Spooky Boogie", infiltrates a CommuField gathering to expose the murderer but her ploy goes awry. The murderer, who is working with Shogo Makishima, kills the owner of "Spooky Boogie" and takes over the avatar as well.
5	5	"Nobody Knows Your Face"; Transliteration: "Dare mo Shiranai Anata no Kao" (Japanese: 誰も知らないあなたの顔)	Kaoru Suzuki	November 9, 2012
Investigating Spooky Boogie's death, Shinya identifies the culprit as Masatake Midou. He, Masaoka, and Akane close in on Masatake and severely wound him before he flees to the safety of his avatars, who turn on him under Shogo's command. The group apprehends Masatake, and Ginoza later tells Akane about his attitude towards Enforcers: his former partner was Shinya, who used to be an Inspector before his Crime Coefficient became high due to a cold case in which one of his Enforcers was killed.
6	6	"Return of the Psychotic Prince"; Transliteration: "Kyōōji no Kikan" (Japanese: 狂王子の帰還)	Yasuo Ejima	November 16, 2012
Unit One theorizes that a mastermind might have influenced the murderous actions of two recent suspects by giving them the ability and motivation to realize their deadly desires. Shinya sees eerie similarities between these cases and the earlier cold case which got him demoted to Enforcer and resulted in the brutal death of Mitsuru Sasayama, his Enforcer. Akane looks for more information about Shinya from Shuusei and Enforcer Shion Karanomori, and learns about Mitsury and the cold Specimen Case. At a girls' school, Rikako Oryo (the enigmatic president of its art club) ensnares an unsuspecting victim and mutilates her body under Shogo's tutelage.
7	7	"Symbolism of Bletilla Striata"; Transliteration: "Shiran no Hanakotoba" (Japanese: 紫蘭の花言葉)	Yukio Nishimoto	November 23, 2012
After realizing that the recent murders and the Specimen Case are connected, Ginoza takes Shinya off the case and asks Akane to watch over him. Makishima, in a study with Toyohisa Senguji, reveals the circumstances of Rikako Oryo's father's death and discusses the decreasing life expectancy. Rikako continues her crimes with the help of Makishima's colleague, Choe Gu-Sung, and abducts a fellow student who is worried about her friend's disappearance.
8	8	"The Rest Is Silence"; Transliteration: "Ato wa, Chinmoku" (Japanese: あとは、沈黙)	Takayuki Hamana	November 30, 2012
Shinya determines that the girls'-school killer is not the murderer from the unsolved case years ago; he explains that the recent murders lack the "originality" and pointed social commentary of the previous killings. When he and Akane realize that the culprit is one of the students, they locate Rikako (who escapes when a teacher stops Shinya from executing her). As the Enforcers try to locate her secret routes and hiding places, Rikako flees – but not before everyone discovers her latest creation. Senguji disposes of Rikako. Shinya picks up a damaged audio file which was deliberately left by Makishima.
9	9	"Paradise Fruit"; Transliteration: "Rakuen no Kajitsu" (Japanese: 楽園の果実)	Kyōhei Ishiguro	December 7, 2012
Shinya takes Akane to visit his former teacher, Jouji Saiga, who agrees to give her a crash course in criminal profiling. Ginoza reprimands her harshly, which results in an argument; Jouji can cloud people's Psycho-Pass by speaking with them, and Ginoza disapproves. Makishima talks with Senguji, a nearly-full cyborg tasked with hunting Shinya.
10	10	"Methuselah's Game"; Transliteration: "Metosura no Yūgi" (Japanese: メトスラの遊戯)	Kazuo Sakai	December 14, 2012
Makishima and Senguji set up a hunt by using Akane's friend, Yuki, as bait to lure Shinya into an abandoned subway station. Entering the station, Shinya finds Yuki in a train car and loses contact with Akane; they must evade Senguji and his canine drones, while a curious Makishima observes from above. Makishima rigs the hunt to give Shinya a chance to create a working transponder; Shinya contacts the group outside, and they go in after him.
11	11	"Saint's Supper"; Transliteration: "Seija no Bansan" (Japanese: 聖者の晩餐)	Hirotaka Endo	December 21, 2012
With a drone delivering him a Dominator, Shinya outwits Senguji and kills him. Yuki is captured by Makishima, with Shinya too weak to follow. As Masaoka treats Shinya's injuries, Akane pursues Makishima alone. To her shock, she discovers that her Dominator is useless against him; his Crime Coefficient levels are too low, and Makishima attributes his ability to "cheat" Sybil's judgement to his free will. He gives Akane the chance to try killing him with Senguji's shotgun, but she cannot do so; Makishima kills Yuki and flees.
12	12	"Devil's Crossroad"	Itsuro Kawasaki	January 10, 2013
Three years ago, guitarist Yayoi was institutionalized after she was identified as a latent criminal. As she anxiously awaits release to play the guitar again, she is approached by Inspector Shinya and Ginoza about a series of crimes in the area with which she was once familiar. Shinya gives her some guitar strings which remind her of Rina Takizaki, a guitarist she admired. When the club they are investigating is set ablaze after Sasayama approaches culprits dealing in Molotov cocktails, Yayoi searches for Rina and discovers that she is part of a resistance group selling Molotov cocktails to overthrow the Sybil System. She tries to stop Rina, but finds that she cannot use the Dominator that Shinya gave her because she is not an Enforcer yet; Rina escapes. Yayoi then resolves to become an Enforcer, and leaves the rehabilitation center.
13	13	"Invitation from the Abyss"; Transliteration: "Shin'en kara no Shōtai" (Japanese: 深淵からの招待)	Yasuo Ejima	January 17, 2013
Ginoza meets with Public Security Bureau head Joushu Kasei about Makishima. Joushu tells him about the real culprit of the three-year-old Specimen Case: Touma Kouzoburou, who is "criminally asymptomatic" like Makishima. She orders Ginoza to capture Makishima alive. Akane agrees to undergo a "memory scoop" to provide an image of Makishima based on her memories of the incident, despite warnings that it may damage her Psycho-Pass. Despite reliving the traumatizing memory, the memory scoop is completed without her Psycho-Pass reaching dangerous levels and provides an image of Makishima. Ginoza is later revealed as Masaoka's son when they discuss Akane's Psycho-Pass.
14	14	"Sweet Poison"; Transliteration: "Amai Doku" (Japanese: 甘い毒)	Shunichi Yoshizawa	January 24, 2013
A man in a helmet commits crimes but his Crime Coefficient is not high enough to set off an alarm before he kills a woman in public. Unit One later learns that criminals wearing the same helmets robbed an armored car. Shinya theorizes that the second crime would have a motive; this leads their investigation to Jyunmei Itoh, who had a grudge against the victim. As Jyunmei tries to escape, Shinya deduces that the helmets copy the low Crime Coefficients of innocent bystanders and help criminals avoid capture. With Akane and Masaoka's help, he apprehends the murderer.
15	15	"The Town Where Sulfur Falls"; Transliteration: "Iō Furu Machi" (Japanese: 硫黄降る街)	Yoji Sato	January 31, 2013
As footage of the helmet killings appear on the Internet, helmets are distributed to more criminals. They begin openly committing more-horrendous crimes, prompting bloodthirsty revenge from the public in the name of self-defense. As the Bureuaus forces suppresses the riots, Shinya deduces that they are intended to draw the police away from the Health and Welfare Ministry's Nona Tower facility (where the Sybil System is located). As Makishima and his gang break in, Shinya, Akane and Shuusei head to the scene.
16	16	"The Gate to Judgment"; Transliteration: "Sabaki no Mon" (Japanese: 裁きの門)	Yutaka Hirata	February 7, 2013
Shinya and Akane chase Makishima to the top of the Nona Tower as Shuusei descends to the basement and loses contact with the network. Makishima defeats Shinya in a fight, but is then knocked out by Akane. Shinya tells Akane to kill Makishima, but Akane controls her emotions. Shuusei overpowers the guards and confronts Guseong at the heart of the Sybil System. Guseong is killed by Kasei, who is revealed to be a cyborg and overrides Shuusei's Dominator to shoot at him.
17	17	"Iron Heart"; Transliteration: "Tetsu no Harawata" (Japanese: 鉄の腸)	Noriyuki Nomata	February 14, 2013
Makishima is arrested and the riots are controlled. Later that day, Kasei tells Ginoza that Makishima's case has been taken out of the MWPSB's hands and orders him to investigate Shuusei's whereabouts. Makishima is later confronted by Kasei, who reveals himself to be Kouzoboro and shares a cybernetic body with Kasei. He explains to Makishima that the Sybil System is a supercomputer network composed of the brains of criminally-asymptomatic individuals like him. Kouzoboro invites Makishima to become part of the system; he refuses, killing Kouzaborou, escaping and contacting Shinya.
18	18	"A Promise Written on Water"; Transliteration: "Mizu ni Kaita Yakusoku" (Japanese: 水に書いた約束)	Shinpei Nagai	February 21, 2013
Kasei assigns Ginoza to recapture Makishima, and asks that Shinya be removed from the case. Ginoza arranges for Shinya to be transferred to Division 2, who are investigating Shuusei's whereabouts. They are confronted by Kasei, who tries to get Ginoza to kill Shinya; Akane knocks Shinya out with her Paralyzer mode. When he recovers, Shinya borrows a helmet from Shion, retrieves keys to a safehouse from Masaoka and leaves the group. He explains in a letter to Akane that the only way he can stop Makishima is to step outside the law.
19	19	"Transparent Shadow"; Transliteration: "Tōmei na Kage" (Japanese: 透明な影)	Yasuo Ejima	February 28, 2013
Ginoza refuses intensive therapy to work on retrieving Shinya and Makishima. Shinya visits Saiga to figure out Makishima's next move, and they surmise that Makishima might attempt to meddle with Japan's food supply to force the country's borders to open. Kasei connects with Sybil to determine their new "pawn." Akane is later contacted by the Sybil System, which says that it will tell her the truth about everything.
20	20	"Where Justice Lies"; Transliteration: "Seigi no Arika" (Japanese: 正義の在処)	Itsuro Kawasaki	March 7, 2013
The Sybil System reveals itself to Akane, saying that she understands the necessity of the system (if not its justifiability) and asking her to help take Makishima alive. Makishima finds the professor responsible for the hyper-oats system and kills him after finding the information he seeks, keeping the man's fingers and eyeballs as a measure against biometric security. Shinya arrives on the scene soon afterwards, and leaves a clue for Unit One. Akane convinces the Sybil System to withdraw Shinya's execution order if she captures Makishima alive. She finds Shinya's clue and learns about the situation as Makishima reaches his destination, with Shinya on his trail.
21	21	"Blood-Stained Reward"; Transliteration: "Chi no Hōshō" (Japanese: 血の褒賞)	Yoji Sato	March 14, 2013
Shinya and his former comrades arrive at the factory, where he tells Akane that they need to shut down power to the facility to bypass security. Akane convinces the Sibyl System to keep her Dominator in paralyzer mode with the safety off (regardless of Crime Coefficient) to use as a trump card against Makishima and Shinya. After the power is shut down, Shinya sneaks into the facility whilst Akane and Yayoi head to the control room in case Makishima tries to activate the emergency power. As Ginoza is trapped under a container, Masaoka comes face-to-face with Makishima. Makishima threatens to blow Ginoza up with dynamite, and Masaoka sacrifices himself to save his son. Ginoza is horrified by his father's death, and Shinya pursues Makishima.
22	22	"Perfect World"; Transliteration: "Kanpeki na Sekai" (Japanese: 完璧な世界)	Naoyoshi Shiotani, Itsuro Kawasaki	March 22, 2013
Shinya stabs Makishima during their fight, but Akane interrupts them. Makishima escapes in a truck; Akane shoots out the tires, and he crashes in a field. Resigned to his fate, Makishima kneels and waits for Shinya to execute him. Akane later tells the Sybil System that someone will pull their plug in the future, and the system asks her to fight for a better future. A young, new Inspector - Mika Shimotsuki, whose friend and love interest was among Rikako's victims - arrives on the scene two months later, and Ginoza (now an Enforcer) believes that Shuusei is dead. Shinya departs in a small cabin room on a ship.

== Home media ==
=== Japanese release ===
Toho
Vol.	Episodes	Bonus disc	Release date	Ref.
1	1, 2	Chimi Chara Psycho-Pass 1	December 21, 2012	
2	3, 4, 5	Psycho-Pass Soundtrack CD Vol. 1	January 25, 2013	
3	6, 7, 8	Chimi Chara Psycho-Pass 2-3	February 22, 2013	
4	9, 10, 11	Chimi Chara Psycho-Pass 4-5	March 22, 2013	
5	12, 13	Psycho Pass Soundtrack CD Vol. 2	April 19, 2013	
6	14, 15, 16	Chimi Chara Psycho-Pass 6-7	May 24, 2013	
7	17, 18, 19	Chimi Chara Psycho-Pass 8-9	June 21, 2013	
8	20, 21, 22	Chimi Chara Psycho-Pass 10-12	July 26, 2013	
Complete season one & new edited version	1-22, 1-11 (new edited version)	N/A	October 15, 2014	
Smart edition box	1-11 (new edited version)	Electronic Scenario Book	April 17, 2019	

=== North American release ===
Funimation Entertainment
Vol.	Episodes	Release date	Ref.
Season one, part one	1-11	March 11, 2014	
Season one, part two	12-22	March 11, 2014	
Complete first season (premium edition)	1-22	March 11, 2014	
Season one	1-22	September 6, 2016	
Season one (classics)	1-22	August 21, 2018	

=== Australian release ===
Madman Entertainment
Vol.	Episodes	Release date	Ref.
Collection 1	1-11	May 21, 2014	
Collection 2	12-22	May 21, 2014	
The Complete Collection	1-22	May 21, 2014	
Complete Season One	1-22	May 4, 2016	

=== United Kingdom release ===
Madman Entertainment
Vol.	Episodes	Release date	Ref.
Complete season 1 collection	1-22	September 1, 2014	
