= Just a Moment (Ling Tosite Sigure album) =

just A moment

Studio album by Ling Tosite Sigure
- Released: May 13, 2009
- Genres: Post-hardcore; indie rock; progressive rock
- Length: 45:54
- Labels: Sony; AICL-2014
- Producer: TK

Ling Tosite Sigure chronology
Inspiration Is Dead (2007)	just A moment (2009)	Still a Sigure Virgin? (2010)

Singles from just A moment
- 1. "Telecastic fake show" Released: April 23, 2008; 2. "moment A rhythm" Released: December 28, 2008

Professional ratings
Review scores
Source	Rating
AllMusic	4.5/5 stars

just A moment is the third studio album by the Japanese rock band Ling Tosite Sigure released on May 13, 2009. It includes both of their previous singles moment A rhythm and Telecastic fake show.

== Track listing ==
All tracks written and composed by Toru "TK" Kitajima.

No.	Title	Length
1.	"Hakaiyo no Yume" (ハカイヨノユメ; Blasphemous Dreams)	4:37
2.	"Hysteric phase show"	3:35
3.	"Tremolo+A"	3:56
4.	"JPOP Xfile"	4:01
5.	"A 7days wonder"	4:40
6.	"a over die"	3:53
7.	"Telecastic fake show"	4:28
8.	"seacret cm"	4:06
9.	"moment A rhythm" (short version)	7:17
10.	"mib126"	5:22
Total length:		45:54
