= Feeling Your UFO =

EP by Ling Tosite Sigure
- Released: July 19, 2006
- Genre: Hardcore punk; post-rock; progressive rock
- Length: 22:55
- Label: Nakano Records; ANTX-1006

Ling Tosite Sigure chronology
#4 (2005)	Feeling Your UFO (2006)	Inspiration Is Dead (2007)

Feeling Your UFO is a mini-album (or EP) by the Japanese rock band Ling Tosite Sigure, released between their 1st and 2nd full-length albums on July 19, 2006.

== Track listing ==
All tracks written and composed by TK.

No.	Title	Length
1.	"Souzou no Security" (想像のSecurity; Imagination security)	3:32
2.	"Kankaku UFO" (感覚UFO; Feeling your UFO)	4:40
3.	"Aki no Kehai no Arpeggio" (秋の気配のアルペジオ; Autumn Sign Arpeggio)	3:35
4.	"Last Dance Revolution" (ラストダンスレボリューション)	4:26
5.	"Sergio Echigo" (セルジオ・エッゴ)	6:42
Total length:		22:55
