= Telecastic Fake Show =

Single by Ling Tosite Sigure

from the album Just a Moment
- Released: August 23, 2008
- Genre: Post-hardcore; indie rock
- Length: 13:38
- Label: Nakano Records; ANTX-1010; ANTX-1011
- Songwriter(s): Toru Kitajima

Ling Tosite Sigure singles chronology
"Telecastic Fake Show" (2008)	"moment A rhythm" (2008)

"Telecastic Fake Show" is a single by Japanese rock band Ling Tosite Sigure. It was released as both a CD and a CD/DVD combo. The single reached No. 17 on the Oricon charts, despite the fact that they belonged to an independent record label. The track "24Reverse" was later included in the limited edition-exclusive second disc of the compilation album Tokyo Ghoul Authentic Sound Chronicle compiled by Sui Ishida.

== Track listing ==
All tracks written and composed by Toru "TK" Kitajima.

CD
No.	Title	Length
1.	"Telecastic fake show"	4:27
2.	"Re:automation"	4:04
3.	"24Reverse"	5:07
Total length:		13:38

DVD
No.	Title	Length
1.	"nakano kill you"	3:10
2.	"Disco Flight"	4:30
3.	"Acoustic"	3:58
4.	"Souzou no Security" (想像のSecurity)	3:32
5.	"Kankaku UFO" (感覚UFO)	4:40
Total length:		19:50
