= Parallel Lives (disambiguation) =

Parallel Lives is a series of biographies by Plutarch.

Parallel Lives may also refer to:

- Parallel Lives (anthology), a novella collection
- Parallel Lives (film), a telefilm
- Parallel Lives (album), an album by Nothing's Carved in Stone
