= Goodnight & Goodluck =

Goodnight & Goodluck may refer to:

- "Goodnight & Goodluck", a song by Reks from More Grey Hairs
- "Goodnight & Goodluck", a song by Nothing's Carved in Stone from Echo
- "Goodnight & Goodluck", a song by the Wise Guys of which JD Era was a member

== See also ==
- Good Night, and Good Luck, a 2005 film by George Clooney
