= Number 5 (Ling Tosite Sigure album) =

#5

Studio album by Ling Tosite Sigure
- Released: February 14, 2018
- Genre: Post-hardcore; math rock; alternative rock
- Length: 47:01
- Label: Sony; JPU Records
- Producer: TK

Ling Tosite Sigure chronology
I'mperfect (2013)	''#5'' (2018)	Last Aurorally (2023)

Singles from #5
- 1. "DIE meets HARD" Released: August 23, 2017

#5 is the sixth studio album by the Japanese rock band Ling Tosite Sigure, released on February 14, 2018. This album includes the band's previous single, "DIE meets HARD", which was used for the opening of the drama series Shimokitazawa DIE HARD. The album peaked at Number 5 on the Oricon chart; while the single peaked at Number 17 on the Oricon chart, and reached Number 46 on the Billboard Japan Hot 100.

== Track listing ==
All tracks written and composed by Toru "TK" Kitajima.

Regular edition CD
No.	Title	Length
1.	"Ultra Overcorrection"	4:45
2.	"Chocolate Passion"	4:17
3.	"Tornado Minority"	4:38
4.	"Who's WhoFO"	4:58
5.	"EneMe"	4:58
6.	"ten to ten"	5:32
7.	"Serial Number of Turbo"	4:19
8.	"DIE meets HARD"	4:08
9.	"High Energy Vacuum"	3:54
10.	"#5"	5:37
Total length:		47:01

Limited edition bonus DVD
No.	Title	Length
1.	"Chocolate Passion" (Music Video with Making Passion)
2.	"#5" (Music Video)
3.	"Die Hard Radio Season 2"
