= Inspiration Is Dead =

Studio album by Ling Tosite Sigure
- Released: August 22, 2007
- Genres: Post-hardcore; indie rock
- Length: 42:36
- Labels: Nakano Records; ANTX-1009
- Producer: TK

Ling Tosite Sigure chronology
| Feeling Your UFO (2006) | Inspiration Is Dead (2007) | Just a Moment (2009) |

Inspiration Is Dead is the second full-length studio album by the Japanese rock band Ling Tosite Sigure, released on August 22, 2007.

== Track listing ==
All tracks written by Toru "TK" Kitajima

| No. | Title | Length |
|---|---|---|
| 1. | "Nakano Kill You" | 3:10 |
| 2. | "Cool J" | 3:56 |
| 3. | "Disco Flight" | 4:30 |
| 4. | "Knife Vacation" | 4:02 |
| 5. | "AM 3:45" | 6:33 |
| 6. | "Akai Yūwaku" (赤い誘惑 "Red temptation") | 4:48 |
| 7. | "1/f no Kanshoku" (1/fの感触 "Feeling of 1/f") | 4:45 |
| 8. | "I Not Crazy Am You Are" | 4:41 |
| 9. | "Yūkei no Kioku" (夕景の記憶 "Memories of Sunset") | 6:11 |
| Total length: | | 42:36 |
