= Takahisa Maeyama =

Japanese actor

- 前山 剛久
- Born: February 7, 1991 (age 35); Osaka, Japan
- Education: Meiji Gakuin University
- Occupations: Actor; social media personality
- Years active: 2010–2022; 2024

Takahisa Maeyama (前山 剛久, Maeyama Takahisa; born February 7, 1991) is a Japanese social media personality and former actor. Maeyama began his acting career in 2011 as a member of D2, a sub-group of Watanabe Entertainment's male acting troupe D-Boys. Since joining D2, Maeyama has appeared and starred in multiple stage plays, including Hypnosis Mic: Division Rap Battle: Rule the Stage (2020–2021) and A New Musical: A Sign of Affection (2021). He has also appeared in television series, such as Kamen Rider Wizard (2012) and 3B no Koibito (2021).

Maeyama retired from acting and the entertainment industry on June 30, 2022. He had attempted to make a comeback in 2024, but he retired again after his comeback was poorly received by the Japanese public. He has since focused on his activities as a TikTok live streamer and music producer.

== Career ==
=== 2010–2021: Acting career ===
In 2010, Maeyama applied for the D-Boys Special Unit Audition, an audition for the fifth member of D-Boys' boy band, D-Date. In August 2010, he was revealed as one of seven finalists on D-Boys' variety show, D-Boys Be Ambitious. Despite not winning a spot in D-Date, he eventually joined D2, a sub-group of D-Boys, in December 2010. After joining D2, Maeyama made his first television appearance with the group on their first television program, D2 Meshi Tomo!, on August 5, 2011.

In 2011, he made his acting debut as Nakazaike Chōji in the Nintama Rantarō musical and reprised the role in 2012. In March 2012, he portrayed Yosuke Hanamura in VisuaLive Persona 4 and reprised the role later in the year in the following sequel production, VisuaLive Persona 4: The Evolution. In the same year, he appeared in the television series Kamen Rider Wizard as Sora/Gremlin, a recurring role.

In September 2015, Maeyama starred in the stage play adaptation of La Corda d'Oro Blue Sky as Kyōya Kisaragi. In March 2016, Maeyama portrayed Kinshiro Kusatsu in the stage play adaptation of Cute High Earth Defense Club Love!. In April 2016, Maeyama portrayed Hotohori in the stage musical adaptation of Fushigi Yûgi.

In January 2017, Maeyama portrayed Eichi Tenshoin in Ensemble Stars! On Stage: Take Your Marks, and he would continue portraying the character in subsequent stage plays. On August 4, 2017, Maeyama was cast as Katsumi Igarashi in the live-action film adaptation of the manga Make a Bow and Kiss, which was released in theaters on November 11, 2017. In November 2017, Maeyama was cast as Yūsuke Nara in the television drama and stage play Ochanomizu Rock.

In June 2019, Maeyama portrayed Uguisumaru in Stage: Touken Ranbu. In October 2019, Maeyama portrayed Shogo Makishima in the stage play adaptation of the first season of Psycho-Pass. In November 2019, he portrayed Andre in the stage musical adaptation of the manga Innocent.

In May 2020, Maeyama portrayed Gentaro Yumeno in the stage play adaptation of Hypnosis Mic: Division Rap Battle, beginning with the second stage play Track 2. In July 2020, Maeyama starred in Crazy Rain, a television drama starring D-Boys. In June 2021, Maeyama starred in A New Musical: A Sign of Affection as Itsuomi. In December 2020, Maeyama was cast as Tatsuya in the television drama adaptation of the manga 3B no Koibito, which was broadcast in January 2021. In August 2021, Maeyama appeared in the stage play adaptation of Crest of the Royal Family as Luca, a role that was double-cast with Kurumu Okamiya. In November 2021, Maeyama appeared in the Japanese production of My Fair Lady as Freddy, a role that was double-cast with Takuto Teranishi.

=== 2022–2024: Retirement and career setback ===
Following the death of his then-girlfriend Sayaka Kanda in December 2021, Maeyama's agency, Watanabe Entertainment, announced his hiatus on January 5, 2022. As a result of his hiatus, he was recast in The Thousand Musketeers, the Japanese production of Piaf, and Hypnosis Mic: Division Rap Battle Rule the Stage. On June 30, 2022, Watanabe Entertainment announced that he had resigned from the company and retired from the entertainment industry to focus on his physical and mental health.

Maeyama later returned to the public by making an Instagram account on February 7, 2024, his 33rd birthday. In August 2024, through an interview with Shukan Josei, Maeyama revealed that he was currently working in the beauty industry and spent the past year training and receiving vocal lessons in South Korea in hopes of becoming an actor in the country, but he had a "strong desire" to return to the Japanese entertainment industry.

Maeyama's comeback was met with criticism due to his past relationship with Kanda. On September 8, 2024, Maeyama announced that he would be appearing in the stage play Aru Hi no Toori Ame to Tomo ni, his first acting role in three years. Following his announcement, two actresses announced through their agencies that they would be dropping out of the play and the stage production announced on September 20, 2024, that they had postponed the play indefinitely due to safety concerns. On October 9, 2024, Maeyama created a YouTube channel and posted a video apologizing for the cancellation of the play. On November 28, 2024, Maeyama stated that he would not be focusing on acting for the time being but would remain active on his YouTube channel and other social media accounts. On the same day, he began referring to himself as a "former actor" in his videos and social media profiles, indicating that he had retired from acting again.

=== 2025–present: Post-acting career ===
In December 2025, Maeyama announced through his Instagram stories that he was now working at a host club in Roppongi under the name Manato. On March 10, 2026, he announced through his Instagram stories that he was no longer working at the location, following online backlash for discussing his relationship with Sayaka Kanda on his manager's YouTube channel. On July 13, 2026, Maeyama confirmed on YouTube that he had "given up" on returning to the entertainment industry and would be focusing on livestreaming on TikTok and music production. On July 31, 2026, Maeyama released his self-composed debut single, "Lovesong", on digital distribution platforms. The single also contains two other songs, "You're Gone" and "Kiss Me."

== Personal life ==
Maeyama attended and graduated from Meiji Gakuin University.

Maeyama was in a relationship with gravure idol and television personality Miyu Kojima until he ended their relationship in September 2021. Around this time, he became romantically involved with actress Sayaka Kanda after the two co-starred in the stage adaptation of Crest of the Royal Family in August 2021. Maeyama and Kanda had dated with the intention of marriage due to their age. In 2024, Maeyama stated that they only dated for two months and had ended their relationship by the time they had starred together in the Japanese production of My Fair Lady in November 2021. On December 18, 2021, Kanda died, and Maeyama was placed under psychiatric care. On January 6, 2022, Shūkan Bunshun leaked audio recordings and text messages that Maeyama and Kanda had exchanged on Line prior to her death, alleging that Maeyama had been verbally abusive to her and dating Kojima during their relationship.

== Filmography ==
=== Film ===
| Year | Title | Role | Notes |
|---|---|---|---|
| 2013 | Kamen Rider Wizard in Magic Land | Sora Takigawa / Gremlin | |
| 2017 | Make a Bow and Kiss | Katsumi Igarashi | |

=== Television ===
| Year | Title | Role | Network | Notes |
|---|---|---|---|---|
| 2011 | D2 Meshi Tomo! | Himself | TV Asahi | Travel documentary |
| 2012 | Kamen Rider Wizard | Sora Takigawa / Gremlin | TV Asahi | Recurring role |
| 2017 | Ochanomizu Rock | Yūsuke Nara | TV Tokyo | |
| 2020 | Crazy Rain | Imae | TV Asahi | |
| 2021 | 3B no Koibito | Tatsuya | TV Asahi | |

=== Theatre ===
| Year | Title | Role | Notes |
|---|---|---|---|
| 2011 | Musical: Nintama Rantarō Vol. 2 | Nakazaike Chōji | |
| 2012 | VisuaLive: Persona 4 | Yosuke Hanamura | |
| 2012 | Musical: Nintama Rantarō Vol. 3 | Nakazaike Chōji | |
| 2012 | VisuaLive: Persona 4 The Evolution | Yosuke Hanamura | |
| 2015 | La Corda d'Oro Blue Sky | Kyōya Kisaragi | |
| 2016 | Fushigi Yûgi | Hotohori | |
| 2017 | Ensemble Stars! On Stage: Take Your Marks | Eichi Tenshoin | |
| 2017 | Ochanomizu Rock | Yūsuke Nara | |
| 2018 | Ensemble Stars! On Stage Festival | Eichi Tenshoin | Concert for Ensemble Stars! On Stage |
| 2019 | Stage: Touken Ranbu: Jiden: Nichinichi no Ha yo Chiruramu | Uguisumaru | |
| 2019 | Psycho-Pass: Chapter 1 | Shogo Makishima | |
| 2019 | Innocent | Andre | |
| 2020 | Hypnosis Mic: Division Rap Battle Rule the Stage (Track 2) | Gentaro Yumeno | |
| 2021 | A New Musical: A Sign of Affection | Itsuomi | |
| 2021 | Crest of the Royal Family | Luca | Double-cast with Kurumu Okamiya |
| 2021 | My Fair Lady | Freddy | Double-cast with Takuto Teranishi |
