= Sands of Time (Nothing's Carved in Stone album) =

Studio album by Nothing's Carved in Stone
- Released: June 9, 2010
- Recorded: 2010
- Genre: Alternative rock
- Length: 41:27
- Label: Dynamord; GUDY-2004

Nothing's Carved in Stone chronology
Parallel Lives (2009)	Sands of Time (2010)	Echo (2011)

Sands of Time is a 2010 album by the Japanese rock band Nothing's Carved in Stone released on June 9, 2010. It reached No. 14 on the Japanese Oricon album charts.

== Track listing ==
All music is composed by Nothing's Carved in Stone

CD
No.	Title	Length
1.	"Chaotic Imagination"	4:07
2.	"Cold Reason"	3:36
3.	"Sands of Time"	3:48
4.	"Around the Clock"	4:08
5.	"Memento"	2:39
6.	"Sunday Morning Escape"	4:21
7.	"Rendaman"	3:26
8.	"Slow Down"	4:02
9.	"The Swim"	3:44
10.	"Pendulum"	3:20
11.	"Palm"	4:16
