= Silversun (disambiguation) =

Silversun is an Australian TV series.

Silversun or Silver Sun may also refer to:

- Silver Sun, an English rock/pop band
  - Silver Sun (Silver Sun album), 1997
- Silver Sun (Nothing's Carved in Stone album), 2012

== See also ==
- Silversun Pickups, an American indie rock band
