= Maze (album) =

Studio album by Nothing's Carved in Stone
- Released: September 16, 2015
- Recorded: 2015
- Genre: Alternative rock
- Length: 52:16
- Label: Dynamord Label (GUDY-2016)

Nothing's Carved in Stone chronology
Strangers in Heaven (2014)	Maze (2015)	Existence (2016)

Singles from Maze
- 1. "Gravity" Released: January 14, 2015

Maze is an album by Japanese rock band Nothing's Carved in Stone released on May 16, 2015. The album peaked at number eight on the Oricon charts.

== Track listing ==
All music is composed by Nothing's Carved in Stone

CD
No.	Title	Length
1.	"Youth City"	4:38
2.	"The Poison Bloom"	3:53
3.	"Milestone"	4:53
4.	"Perfect Sound"	3:34
5.	"DeLorean wo Sagashite" (デロリアンを探して; Searching for a DeLorean)	5:35
6.	"Maze**"	4:58
7.	"Discover, You Have To"	3:29
8.	"Calling Behavior"	5:01
9.	"Go My Punks!!!!"	5:03
10.	"Gravity (Album Mix)"	4:48
11.	"Thief"	6:24
