= Round the clock =

Round the clock may refer to:

- a service available at any time, 24/7
- Round the Clock (Darts), the game played on a dartboard
- Round the Clock (radio), an English internet radio service from China Radio International

== See also ==
- Around the Clock, 1906 musical
- "Around the Clock" (song)
- Time
