= I'mperfect =

Studio album by Ling Tosite Sigure
- Released: April 10, 2013
- Recorded: 2012 – February, 2013
- Genre: Post-hardcore; math rock; alternative rock; shoegaze
- Length: 37:31
- Label: Sony; JPU Records
- Producer: TK

Ling Tosite Sigure chronology
Still a Sigure Virgin? (2010)	I'mperfect (2013)	#5 (2018)

Singles from I'mperfect
- 1. "Abnormalize" Released: November 14, 2012

Professional ratings
Review scores
Source	Rating
AllMusic	4/5 stars

I'mperfect (stylised as i'mperfect) is the fifth studio album by the Japanese rock band Ling Tosite Sigure, released on April 10, 2013. This album includes both their previous singles. The single "Abnormalize" was used as the opening theme for anime series, Psycho-Pass. The album was released in the UK and Europe by JPU Records.

== Track listing ==
All tracks written and composed by Toru "TK" Kitajima.

No.	Title	Length
1.	"Beautiful Circus"	3:16
2.	"Abnormalize"	3:36
3.	"Metamorphose"	3:26
4.	"Filmsick Mystery"	3:43
5.	"Sitai Miss Me"	4:00
6.	"Make Up Syndrome" (album mix)	4:02
7.	"Monster"	3:40
8.	"Kimi to Oku" (キミトオク)	4:54
9.	"Missing Ling"	6:54
Total length:		37:31
