= Number 4 (album) =

#4

Studio album by Ling Tosite Sigure
- Released: November 9, 2005
- Genres: Post-hardcore; indie rock
- Length: 45:38
- Labels: Nakano Records; ANTX-1002

Ling Tosite Sigure chronology
''#4'' (2005)	Feeling Your UFO (2006)

#4 is the debut studio album by the Japanese rock band, Ling Tosite Sigure. It was released on November 9, 2005 under Nakano Records label.

Almost exactly 15 years after the release of #4, the band released a remastered version on November 11, 2020 titled #4 -Retornado- (or #4 -Retornade-).

== Track listing ==
All tracks written and composed by TK.

No.	Title	Length
1.	"Azayaka na Satsujin" (鮮やかな殺人; Brilliant Murder)	4:45
2.	"Telecaster no Shinjitsu" (テレキャスターの真実; Telecaster's Truth)	3:26
3.	"Sadistic Summer"	4:26
4.	"Turbocharger On" (ターボチャージャーON)	5:17
5.	"AcoustiC"	3:58
6.	"O.F.T"	4:51
7.	"Crazy Kanjou Style" (CRAZY感情STYLE; Crazy Emotion Style)	5:00
8.	"Tornado G" (トルネードG)	3:13
9.	"Boukan" (傍観; Onlooking)	6:20
10.	"TK in the Yuukei" (TK in the 夕景; Evening Scenery)	4:22
Total length:		45:38
