= Last Aurorally =

Studio album by Ling Tosite Sigure
- Released: April 12, 2023
- Genre: Post-hardcore
- Length: 42:40
- Label: Sony Music Japan

Ling Tosite Sigure chronology
#5 (2018)	Last Aurorally (2023)

Last Aurorally is the seventh studio album by Japanese rock band Ling Tosite Sigure. The album was released on April 12, 2023, through Sony Music Japan. Five songs were released as singles, including "Laser Beamer", which was used as the theme song to the stage play Psycho-Pass: Virtue and Vice and "Perfake Perfect" which was used for the second stage play Virtue and Vice 2. The song "Alexithymia Spare" was also used for the series, being the opening theme to Psycho-Pass Providence.

== Track listing ==
Last Aurorally track listing
No.	Title	Length
1.	"Super Sonic Aurorally"	3:40
2.	"Tatsumaite Sennou" (竜巻いて鮮脳)	3:45
3.	"Marvelous Persona"	4:16
4.	"Laser Beamer"	4:24
5.	"Self-Hacking"	5:03
6.	"Alexithymia Spare" (アレキシサイミアスペア)	5:25
7.	"Neighbormind"	4:05
8.	"Perfake Perfect"	4:41
9.	"Metsubou Craft" (滅亡craft)	7:21
Total length:		42:40

== Charts ==
=== Weekly charts ===
Weekly chart performance for Last Aurorally
Chart (2023)	Peak position
Japanese Albums (Oricon)	9
Japanese Combined Albums (Oricon)	13
Japanese Hot Albums (Billboard Japan)	8

=== Monthly charts ===
Monthly chart performance for Last Aurorally
Chart (2023)	Peak position
Japanese Albums (Oricon)	32
