= Revolt (Nothing's Carved in Stone album) =

Studio album by Nothing's Carved in Stone
- Released: June 26, 2013
- Genre: Alternative rock
- Length: 51:15
- Label: Epic Records Japan; ESCL-4066

Nothing's Carved in Stone chronology
Silver Sun (2012)	Revolt (2013)	Strangers In Heaven (2014)

Singles from Revolt
- 1. "Out of Control" Released: March 6, 2013

Revolt is a 2013 album by the Japanese rock band Nothing's Carved in Stone released on June 26, 2013. The album peaked at 17 on the Oricon charts.

== Track listing ==
All music is composed by Nothing's Carved in Stone

CD
No.	Title	Length
1.	"Song for an Assassin"	0:33
2.	"Assassin"	4:04
3.	"You're in Motion"	4:32
4.	"Murasame no Naka de" (村雨の中で; In the Autumn Rain)	4:39
5.	"Out of Control"	4:35
6.	"Sick"	4:53
7.	"Shui Gunjō" (朱い群青; Crimson Blue)	5:12
8.	"Bog"	4:09
9.	"Predestined Lovers"	4:41
10.	"Kirameki no Hana" (きらめきの花; Flower Glitter)	4:42
11.	"The Fool"	4:15
