= Strangers in Heaven =

Studio album by Nothing's Carved in Stone
- Released: August 6, 2014
- Genre: Alternative rock
- Label: Epic Records; ESCL-4066

Nothing's Carved in Stone chronology
Revolt (2013)	Strangers in Heaven (2014)	MAZE (2015)

Singles from Strangers in Heaven
- 1. "Tsubame Kurimuzon" Released: December 18, 2013

Strangers in Heaven is a 2014 album by the Japanese rock band Nothing's Carved in Stone released on August 6, 2014.

== Track listing ==
All music is composed by Nothing's Carved in Stone

CD
No.	Title	Length
1.	"Intro"	1:12
2.	"Shimmer Song"	5:03
3.	"Brotherhood"	4:12
4.	"Tsubame Kurimuzon" (ツバメクリムゾン; Crimson Swallow)	4:10
5.	"Crying Skull"	4:38
6.	"What's My Satisfaction"	4:54
7.	"Sekkei nite" (雪渓にて; In a Snowy Valley)	7:30
8.	"Idols"	4:26
9.	"(as if it's) A Warning"	4:15
10.	"Midnight Train"	5:28
11.	"Chimera no Yoru" (キマイラの夜; Chimera's Night)	4:40
12.	"7th Floor"	1:46
