= Gravitation (disambiguation) =

Gravitation is the mass-proportionate force of attraction among matter.

Gravitation may also refer to:

- Newton's law of universal gravitation, the classical theory of gravitation
- General relativity, the theory of gravitation published by Albert Einstein
- Gravitation (book), a reference book about Einstein's theory of general relativity
- Gravitation (film), a 1968 Yugoslav film
- Gravitation (M. C. Escher), a mixed-media work by M. C. Escher
- Gravitation (manga), a Yaoi/shonen-ai manga by Maki Murakami, and related media.
- Gravitation (song), a song by Kent

== See also ==
- Gravity (disambiguation)
