= Psycho-Pass: Inspector Shinya Kogami =

Japanese manga series

- Cover of the first tankōbon volume, featuring Shinya Kogami

PSYCHO-PASS 監視官 狡噛慎也 (Saiko Pasu Kanshikan Kōgami Shinya)
- Genre: Crime, science fiction
- Manga
- Written by: Midori Gotou
- Illustrated by: Natsuo Sai
- Published by: Mag Garden
- English publisher: NA: Dark Horse Comics
- Magazine: Monthly Comic Blade (June 30 – July 30, 2014); Monthly Comic Garden (September 5, 2014 – November 4, 2017)
- Original run: June 30, 2014 – November 4, 2017
- Volumes: 6
- icon

Psycho-Pass: Inspector Shinya Kogami (Japanese: PSYCHO-PASS 監視官 狡噛慎也, Hepburn: Saiko Pasu Kanshikan Kōgami Shinya) is a Japanese manga series written by Midori Gotou and illustrated by Natsuo Sai. The manga is a prequel to Production I.G's 2012 Psycho-Pass anime series, focusing on the younger days of Shinya Kogami, an Inspector working for Public Safety Bureau's Criminal Investigation Division in contrast to his darker characterization from the television series where he is recognized by the Sybil System as a latent criminal.

The series was published by Mag Garden between 2014 and 2017, reaching a total of six collected volumes. It was licensed for English released in North America by Dark Horse Comics. While the series was well received in Japan through positive sales, critical response to the manga was mixed due to the more naive handling of Kogami's character as he is not considered as striking as in the anime. However, the art was praised.

== Plot ==
Eight years before the events of Psycho-Pass, the present Enforcer Shinya Kogami works as an Inspector in the Public Safety Bureau's Criminal Investigation Division city-regulating Sybil System. He works in Unit Three with Inspector Yoshitoshi Waku and Enforcers Tomomi Masaoka, Naoto Kurata, Hina Amari, and Tsubasa Torii, as well as Analyst Maru.

== Publication ==
Psycho-Pass: Inspector Shinya Kogami, written by Midori Gotou and illustrated by Natsuo Sai, was serialized in Mag Garden's Monthly Comic Blade from June 30 to July 30, 2014, when the magazine ceased its publication. The series was then moved to the newly launched Monthly Comic Garden, where it ran from September 5, 2014, to November 4, 2017. Mag Garden collected its chapters in six tankōbon volumes, released from October 10, 2014, to January 10, 2018.

The series was licensed by Dark Horse Comics in March 2016 for an English release.

=== Volumes ===
No.	Original release date	Original ISBN	English release date	English ISBN
1	October 10, 2014	978-4-8000-0368-3	November 9, 2016	978-1-5067-0120-2
2	April 10, 2015	978-4-8000-0425-3	May 24, 2017	978-1-5067-0370-1
3	December 10, 2015	978-4-8000-0522-9	September 13, 2017	978-1-5067-0535-4
4	August 10, 2016	978-4-8000-0601-1	March 7, 2018	978-1-5067-0536-1
5	July 10, 2017	978-4-8000-0700-1	October 26, 2022	978-1-5067-2225-2
6	January 10, 2018	978-4-8000-0740-7	February 22, 2023	978-1-5067-2226-9

== Reception ==
The manga was popular in Japan; The first volume of the series sold 16,591 units in Japan during its debut, while the second surpassed it with 41,263 units in total during its second release week.

Critical response primarily focused on the lead. Robert Frazer of UK Anime Network praised Kogami's role in the prequel manga, Psycho-Pass: Inspector Shinya Kogami, due to his interactions with others, finding it more appealing than Akane Tsunemori's role in the anime's sequel. Kogami was noted by critics to have a different characterization in the manga that distanced his cold personality from the first television series which helps to provide major depths to his character as his younger days are explored. In retrospect, Comic Bastard called Kogami as a breakout character based on his role in the first series comparing him to other popular characters as Dirty Harry and Wolverine among others and thus felt that his characterization in the manga was flat for removing the traits of the anime series that appealed to the audience. In regards to the main plot, Manga News commented that the series does not stand out as the criminals Unit 3 faces are easily captured but still felt there was potential for improvement.

Natsuo Sai's artwork was praised by UK Anime Network for the handling of panels and characters' looks though the backgrounds felt little explored, while Comic Bastards felt that the narrative made little progress as the antagonists do not stand out. Reviewfix said that while the artwork was faithful to the anime adaptation but lacked the appeal of the animation due to the difference in aesthetics as a result of lacking colors. Multiversity Comics also heavily praised the art due to the variety of facial expressions featured mixed with a subtle comedy style. As the second volume started focusing on action sequences, Manga News lamented they were hard to follow with the French translation by Kana.
