= Kanshikan Tsunemori Akane =

Japanese manga series

- Cover of the sixth tankōbon volume, featuring Akane Tsunemori

監視官 常守朱
- Manga
- Written by: Hikaru Miyoshi
- Published by: Shueisha
- Magazine: Jump Square (November 2, 2012 – May 2, 2013); Jump Square website (June 4, 2013 – December 4, 2014)
- Original run: November 2, 2012 – December 4, 2014
- Volumes: 6
- icon

Kanshikan Tsunemori Akane (監視官 常守朱; "Inspector Akane Tsunemori") is a Japanese manga series by Hikaru Miyoshi, based on the Psycho-Pass anime series. It was serialized in Shueisha's shōnen manga magazine Jump Square from November 2012 to May 2013, and later on the magazine's official website from June 2013 to December 2014.

== Publication ==
Kanshikan Tsunemori Akane by Hikaru Miyoshi is based on the anime series Psycho-Pass and focuses on the title character Akane Tsunemori as she works as an inspector within the Bureau forces from dystopian Japan labeled as Sybil System. The manga was serialized in Shueisha's shōnen manga magazine Jump Square from November 2, 2012, to May 2, 2013. It later ran on the magazine's website from June 4, 2013, to December 4, 2014. Shueisha collected its chapters in six tankōbon volumes, released from February 4, 2013, to January 5, 2015.

=== Volumes ===
No.	Release date	ISBN
1	February 4, 2013	978-4-08-870623-8
2	June 4, 2013	978-4-08-870765-5
3	November 1, 2013	978-4-08-870826-3
4	April 4, 2014	978-4-08-880118-6
5	August 4, 2014	978-4-08-880162-9
6	January 5, 2015	978-4-08-880284-8

== Reception ==
By November 2013, the manga had 380,000 copies in circulation. By December 2014, the manga had over 1 million copies in circulation. The six volumes debuted on Oricon's weekly chart of best-selling manga; the first volume debuted 14th (47,401 copies sold); the second volume debuted 20th (56,500 copies sold); the third volume debuted 24th (37,483 copies sold); the fourth volume debuted 20th (34,874 copies sold); the fifth volume debuted 16th (61,344 copies sold); the sixth volume debuted 12th (79,259 copies sold).

Fantasy Mundo's Patricia Llamas stated the manga adaptation was faithful to Akane's characterization as it explored the deep bond with Kogami and the flaws with the Sybil System, a theme also explored with the other members of the cast.

== See also ==
- Moriarty the Patriot, a manga series illustrated by Hikaru Miyoshi
