= Gravity Investments =

American investment services company

- Company type: Private company
- Industry: Financial services
- Founded: 2000; 26 years ago
- Founder: James Damschroder
- Headquarters: Denver, Colorado, United States
- Services: Investment Robo-advisory
- Website: www.gravityinvestments.com

Gravity Investments is an American investment services company. It is based in Denver, Colorado. Founded in 2000 by James Damschroder, the company operates as a digital advice platform or Institutional RoboAdvisory. They developed Gsphere, a software platform.

== History ==
The company was issued patents in 2009 for its visual representation of a portfolio, and again in 2011 for Diversification Measurement and Analysis System.

Gravity Capital Partners (the investment management subsidiary and a Registered Investment Adviser) was founded in 2010 by James Damschroder and John Osland.

== Modern portfolio theory ==
The underlying portfolio optimization process is an offshoot of modern portfolio theory; it uses diversification optimization to create diversification-weighted portfolios and provides tools for portfolio analysis. Once a portfolio is plugged in, it allows advisers to holistically determine which asset classes clients are too invested in and which ones may broaden the portfolio.
