= Gravity (Nothing's Carved in Stone song) =

Single by Nothing's Carved in Stone
- Released: January 14, 2015
- Genre: Alternative rock
- Length: 9:45
- Label: Epic Records; ESCL-4347

Nothing's Carved in Stone singles chronology
"Tsubame Kurimuzon" (2013)	"Gravity" (2015)

"Gravity" is a single by the Japanese rock band Nothing's Carved in Stone released on January 14, 2015.

== Track listing ==
All music is composed by Nothing's Carved in Stone

CD
No.	Title	Length
1.	"Gravity"	4:44
2.	"GOD HAND GAME"	5:01
