= Out of Control (Nothing's Carved in Stone song) =

Single by Nothing's Carved in Stone
- Released: March 6, 2013
- Genre: Alternative rock
- Label: Epic Records; ESCL-4036

Nothing's Carved in Stone singles chronology
"Spirit Inspiration" (2012)	"Out of Control" (2013)	"Tsubame Kurimuzon" (2013)

"Out of Control" is a single by the Japanese rock band Nothing's Carved in Stone released on March 6, 2013. The music was used as the second opening theme for the anime series Psycho-Pass.

== Track listing ==
All music is composed by Nothing's Carved in Stone

CD
No.	Title	Length
1.	"Out of Control"	4:35
2.	"Crystal Beat"	3:59
3.	"Raining Ash"	4:33
