= Law of Gravity (disambiguation) =

The Law of Gravity refers to the natural phenomenon known as Gravitation.

Law(s) of Gravity may also refer to:

- Law of Gravity (CSI), an episode of CSI
- Law of Gravity (I Am Weasel)" (I Am Weasel), an episode of I Am Weasel
- Laws of Gravity (Oz), an episode of Oz
- Laws of Gravity (film), a 1992 American crime film
