= Ling Tosite Sigure =

Japanese rock band

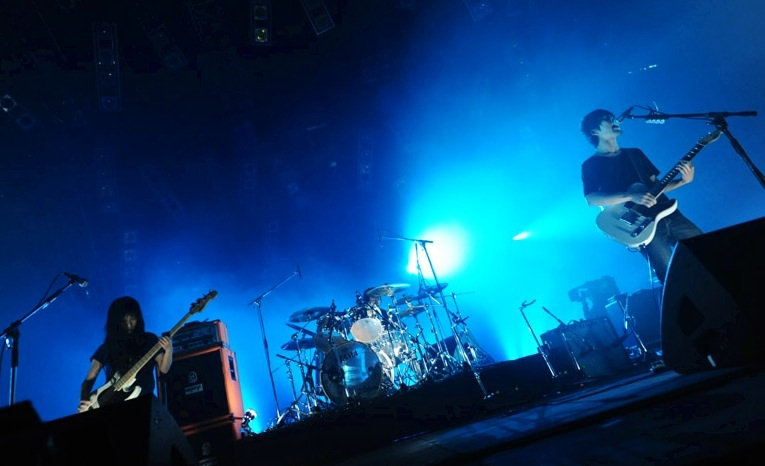
- Ling Tosite Sigure; from left to right: 345, Pierre, TK

Background information
- Origin: Saitama, Japan
- Genres: Post-hardcore; math rock; indie rock; progressive rock
- Years active: 2002–present
- Labels: Nakano (2005–2008); Sony Music Associated (2008–present); JPU
- Members: Tōru "TK" Kitajima; Miyoko "345" Nakamura; Masatoshi "Pierre" Nakano
- Past members: Noda MEN
- Website: sigure.jp

Ling Tosite Sigure (Japanese: 凛として時雨, Hepburn: Rin Toshite Shigure; lit. 'late-autumn rain shower' or 'cold seasonal rain', stylized in sentence case) are a Japanese rock trio, formed in Saitama Prefecture in 2002. The band's style resembles post-hardcore, progressive rock, and math rock, often incorporating rapid changes of tempo and mood framed in complex guitar melodies and technical drumming. They utilize both male and female vocals ranging from soft singing to loud wails and screams.

== Biography ==
Ling Tosite Sigure was formed in 2002 in Saitama, Japan. TK (vocals, guitar) and 345 (vocals, bass) started first with NodaMEN (drums) then Pierre Nakano (drums) joined shortly, replacing Noda. The band released several demos before starting their own label, Nakano Records, and releasing their debut album #4. Their second album, Inspiration is DEAD, was released on August 22, 2007, following an EP Feeling Your UFO the previous year, giving the band increased popularity and exposure throughout Japan. They appeared in the Countdown music festival in 2007 and continued to tour on a regular basis.

On April 23, 2008, the band released their first single "Telecastic fake show", which charted in the Oricon Top 20. In July they participated in the Fuji Rock Festival and in August the Rising Sun Rock Festival. In December 2008, Ling Tosite Sigure released the single "moment A rhythm", after signing to major label Sony Music. The single included an art book consisting of Kitajima's photography.

Their third album, Just a Moment, was released on May 15, 2009, from which "JPOP Xfile" was featured on Space Shower TV. In August they performed at the Summer Sonic Festival and toured throughout Japan. In 2010, the band performed a massive nationwide tour, "I Was Music", culminating at the high-profile Saitama Super Arena venue in the band's home city. In May, they traveled to England and played their first international shows in London and Brighton before returning to the studio to record new material.

The band released their fourth album Still a Sigure Virgin? on September 22, 2010. They went on their "Virgin Killer" tour from late October to early December. The first music video from the album, "I Was Music", aired on September 14. In 2011, the band continued to tour as TK released a film and photo book and Nakano released an instructional drum DVD.

On November 14, 2012, they released single titled "Abnormalize". The title song was used for the opening of the anime series Psycho-Pass. The song was performed on Music Station.

The band's 5th studio album I'mperfect was released on April 10, 2013. The band signed to specialized European record label JPU Records in June 2013 and released I'mperfect all across Europe.

The band released the single "Enigmatic Feeling" on November 5, 2014. The title song was used for the opening of the anime series Psycho-Pass 2.

On January 14, 2015, the band released another single, "Who What Who What", and their first compilation album Best of Tornado. Unlike their other singles, "Who What Who What" only contained one song, which was used for the anime movie Psycho-Pass: The Movie. The song was performed on Music Station. Best of Tornado featured remixed and remastered editions of their previous songs. There were 3 different releases of the album: the regular version, featuring one disc; the Tornado Edition, which contained 2 discs, the second having 11 music videos, and the Hyper Tornado Edition which contained 3 discs, the third being several demo tapes and audio of their live performances.

An EP titled Es or S was released on September 2, 2015. The limited edition featured a 7-inch LP, A-side playing "SOSOS" and the B-side being "Mirror Frustration".

On August 23, 2017, the band released the single "DIE meets HARD". The single featured a song made in collaboration with Koji Nakamura ("DIE meets HARD Koji Nakamura Remix"). The Limited Edition came with 2 discs; one containing 3 songs and the other containing their "DIE meets HARD" music video and a 15-minute podcast between the 3 members (titled DIE HARD radio on the disk). A 1-minute edit of the song was used as the opening for the drama series Shimokitazawa DIE HARD.

On November 17, 2017, the band's 6th studio album #5 was announced with a February 14, 2018, release date. This was the band's first album release in roughly 5 years. The limited-edition came with a DVD containing music videos for "Chocolate Passion" and "#5", as well as a second installment of DIE HARD radio, which once again featured a podcast between the three members. In addition, a nationwide tour (Rin to Shinku Tour 2018 "Five For You") was announced to accompany the album, starting March 3 at Kanazawa EIGHT HALL, and lasting 12 total performances.

On April 18, 2019, the band released their new song "laser beamer" digitally. The song was written for the first ever stage adaptation of the anime series Psycho-Pass entitled Psycho-Pass: Virtue and Vice.

On July 3, 2019, the band digitally released the single titled "Neighbormind / laser beamer" from which "Neighbormind" was later used as the main theme for the Japanese dub of the film Spider-Man: Far From Home.

Almost exactly 15 years after the release of #4 the band decided to release a remastered version on November 11, 2020, titled #4 -Retornado- (or #4 -Retornade-).

The band released a new single Perfake Perfect on January 20, 2021. The title's song was used as theme song of the second stage adaptation Psycho-Pass: Virtue and Vice 2 from the Psycho-Pass anime series. Few days before, on January 18, 2021, the Perfake Perfect Tour took its first place in KT Zepp Yokohama.

On May 11, 2022, the band released the new digital single "Tatsumaite senno (竜巻いて鮮脳)" to celebrate their 20th anniversary.

On Sep 21st, "Marvelous Persona" was chosen as the opening theme for Line News Vision drama series, Joge Kankei.

On Nov 11, Sigure announced their work-in-progress seventh studio album, Last Aurorally, along with a promotional tour titled Aurora Is Mine. The album released on April 12, 2023.

On July 1, 2023, The band announced the concert of Tornado Anniversary 2023 〜15m12cm〜 to celebrate 15th year of their major debut single, moment A rhythm on December 8, 2023.

On April 24, 2024, the band made an announcement in celebration of Pierre Nakano joining Ling Tosite Sigure in 2004. They have decided to hold four concert tours, starting at Zepp Osaka Bayside, followed by Haneda and DiverCity, and ending at Zepp Nagoya.

The band played at the Zepp Haneda in Tokyo on March 30, 2026.

== Band member ==
Current members

- Tōru "TK" Kitajima (北嶋徹 born December 23, 1982) – guitar, vocals (2002–present)
- Miyoko "345" Nakamura (中村美代子 born April 1, 1983) – bass guitar, vocals (2002–present)
- Masatoshi "Pierre" Nakano (ピエール中野 born July 18, 1980) – drums (2004–present)

Former member

- Noda MEN (野田MEN) – drums (2002–2004)

== Discography ==
=== Studio albums ===
List of studio albums, showing year released, album details, selected chart positions, and sales
Title	Details	Peak chart positions		Sales
Title	Details	JPN	JPN Hot	Sales
#4	Released: November 9, 2005; Label: Nakano Records; Formats: CD, digital download, streaming	145	26	9,000
Inspiration Is Dead	Released: August 22, 2007; Label: Nakano Records; Formats: CD, digital download, streaming	39	—	28,000
Just a Moment	Released: May 13, 2009; Label: Sony Music Associated Records; Formats: CD, digital download, streaming	4	—	44,000
Still a Sigure Virgin?	Released: September 22, 2010; Label: Sony Music Associated Records; Formats: CD, digital download, streaming	1	—	45,000
I'mperfect	Released: April 10, 2013; Label: Sony Music Associated Records; Formats: CD, digital download, streaming	3	—	30,000
#5	Released: February 14, 2018; Label: Sony Music Associated Records; Formats: CD, digital download, streaming	5	8	13,552+
Last Aurorally	Released: April 12, 2023; Label: Sony Music Associated Records; Formats: CD, CD+Blu-ray, digital download, streaming	9	8	4,484
"—" denotes releases that did not chart.

=== Compilation albums ===
List of compilation albums, showing year released, selected album details, chart positions, and sales
Title	Details	Peak chart positions		Sales
Title	Details	JPN	JPN Hot	Sales
Best of Tornado	Released: January 14, 2015; Label: Sony Music Associated Records; Formats: CD, digital download, streaming	6	—	26,984+
Psycho-Pass: Cutting the Digital Domination	Released: June 7, 2023; Label: Sony Music Associated Records; Formats: Vinyl	44	54	765+
"—" denotes releases that did not chart.

=== Extended plays ===
List of extended plays, showing year released, selected details, chart positions, and sales
Title	Details	Peak chart positions		Sales
Title	Details	JPN	JPN Hot	Sales
Feeling Your UFO	Released: July 19, 2006; Label: Nakano Records; Formats: CD, digital download, streaming	192	—	2,100
Es or S	Released: September 2, 2015; Label: Sony Music Associated Records; Formats: CD, digital download, 7-inch single, streaming	5	5	11,044
Lost God of Sasori	Released: October 22, 2025; Label: Sony Music Associated Records; Formats: CD, digital download, streaming	42	—	1,636
"—" denotes releases that did not chart.

=== Singles ===
List of singles, showing year released, selected chart positions, sales, certifications, and album name
Title	Year	Peak chart positions		Sales	Certifications	Album
Title	Year	JPN	JPN Hot	Sales	Certifications	Album
"Telecastic Fake Show"	2008	17	80	21,000		Just a Moment
"Moment a Rhythm"	2008	15	—	13,000		Just a Moment
"Abnormalize"	2012	8	13	100,000+	RIAJ: Gold (dig.)	I'mperfect
"Enigmatic Feeling"	2014	8	5	100,000+	RIAJ: Gold (dig.)	Best of Tornado
"Who What Who What"	2015	6	4	17,792+		Non-album single
"Die Meets Hard"	2017	17	46	5,394+		#5
"Laser Beamer"	2019	14	—	3,000		Last Aurorally
"Neighbormind"	2019	14	—			Last Aurorally
"Perfake Perfect"	2021	14	—			Last Aurorally
"Tatsumaite Sennou" (竜巻いて鮮脳)	2022	—	—			Last Aurorally
"Marvelous Persona"	2022	—	—			Last Aurorally
"Alexithymia Spare" (アレキシサイミアスペア)	2023	40	—			Last Aurorally
"Kodoku no Saibou" (狐独の才望)	2023	—	—			Non-album singles
"Trrrrrrrrrrrrrrrrrrrue Lies"	2024	50	—	1,084		Non-album singles
"—" denotes releases that did not chart.

=== Other charted songs ===
List of songs not released as singles, showing year released, selected chart positions, and album name
Title	Year	Peak chart positions	Album
Title	Year	JPN Hot	Album
"Beautiful Circus"	2013	88	I'mperfect

== Music videos ==
Year	Song	Director(s)
2005	"Sadistic Summer"	Unknown
2006	"想像のSecurity" (Imagination Security)	Hideaki Fukui
2007	"DISCO FLIGHT"	UNLUCKY YOUNGMEN
2008	"Telecastic fake show"	Unknown
2009	"secret cm"	Yusuke Kurita
2009	"JPOP Xfile"	Jika
2010	"I was music"	Daisuke Shimada
2010	"illusion is mine"	Yasunori Kakegawa
2012	"abnormalize"	Masakazu Fukatsu
2013	"Beautiful Circus "	Masakazu Fukatsu
2013	"Metamorphose"	Masakazu Fukatsu
2014	"Enigmatic Feeling"	Masakazu Fukatsu
2015	"Who What Who What"	Unknown
2015	"SOSOS"	Unknown
2017	"DIE meets HARD"	Ikuma Ara
2018	"Chocolate Passion"	maxilla
2018	"#5"	Unknown
2019	"Laser Beamer"	Shuichi Banba
2019	"Neighbormind"	Masakazu Fukatsu
2021	"Perfake Perfect"	Junta Yamaguchi
2022	"Tatsumaite senno (竜巻いて鮮脳)"	Masaki Watanabe (maxilla)
2022	"Marvelous Persona"	shuntaro
2023	"alexithymiaspare (アレキシサイミアスペア)"	Ikuma Ara
2023	"Kodoku no Saibou" (狐独の才望)	shuntaro
2024	"Trrrrrrrrrrrrrrrrrrrue Lies"	Yousuke Asada
2025	"Loo% Who%"	Takuya Oyama (VANLI)

== Tours and concerts ==
=== Tours ===
2004

- 40 Days Video TOUR
- Sadistic Summer TOUR 2004

2005

- Simple is DEAD 2005
- Give me Your "TURBO" TOUR 2005

2006

- 3454123TOUR2006
- 凛として時雨 TOUR～EXOTIC SUMMER FEELING 2006
- ONEMAN TOUR "Pegasus"

2007

- ONEMAN TOUR 2007 My Name is DEAD
- ONEMAN TOUR 2007 DYNAMITE SEXY SUMMER
- Record TOUR 2007 NAKANO Inspiration

2008

- ONEMAN TOUR 2008 FIGHTING G
- ONEMAN TOUR 2008 P-RHYTHM AUTUMN

2009

- TOUR 2009 "last A moment"
- TOUR 2009 "Tornado Z"

2010

- TOUR 2010 "I was music"
- 凛として時雨 TOUR 2010 "I was music" SUPER FINAL
- TOUR 2010 "VIRGIN KILLER"

2011

- TOUR 2011 "VIRGIN KILLER SUICIDE"
- TOUR 2011 "αβ+1"

2013

- TOUR 2013 "Dear Perfect"
- TOUR 2013 "Dear Perfect" ONEMAN LIVE at Nippon Budokan ～10th Tornado Anniversary～

2015

- Hyper Tornado Tour 2015
- S.O.S Tour 2015
- Tour 2015 Final Hyper S.O.S

2018

- Tour 2018 "Five for you"
- Tour 2018 "Five for you" ～Vacuum the Hall Edition～

2019

- Tour 2019 Golden Fake Thinking ～Sigure Tail Edition
- Tour 2019 Golden Fake Thinking

2021

- Perfake Perfect Tour 2021

2022

- DEAD IS ALIVE TOUR 2022
- DEAD IS ALIVE TOUR 2022 ～竜巻いて延命～

2023

- aurora is mine tour 2023

2024

- 凛として時雨 TOUR 2024 Pierrrrrrrrrrrrrrrrrrrre Vibes

=== Toki ni Ame ===
2003

- トキニ雨#1

2004

- トキニ雨#2
- トキニ雨#3
- トキニ雨#4
- トキニ雨#5

2006

- トキニ雨#5
- トキニ雨#6

2007

- トキニ雨#7
- トキニ雨#8
- トキニ雨#9

2008

- トキニ雨#10

2009

- トキニ雨#11
- トキニ雨#12

2011

- トキニ雨#13～Tornado Edition～

2014

- トキニ雨#14

2016

- トキニ雨#15～Hybrid Tornado Edition～

2023

- トキニ雨#16

=== Lives ===
2002

- First Live at Ikebukuro Chop

2003

- MUSIC LOVERS NIGHT Vol.3

2004

- GIANT PROUDLY PRESENTS LIVE Three Fxxkin' Pieces
- MOVING ON VOL.3
- Top Secret Eve
- Sylvanian Families Project 'yasashisa no oto# 1''
- Explosion comfort～Bakuon Vol．1～
- DOPE HITS #1
- oto no iro vol. 1 ~ Mushoku tōmei~
- WONDER MISSELE Vol.32
- FiVE HOLES IN THERE vol.2
- Shami ONEMAN Front arc
- Lion Records Project "King's Dinner VOL.2"
- MUSIC LOVERS NIGHT Vol.4
- Local Standard
- White Planet Dog
- Shōki no sata de nai, to
- JUDY'S TURN TO CRY vol.28
- Color of Sound vol.2 ~Light Blue~
- AWAKENING CITY
- PJ Project 15th Toyoko Shonan Loud Sound Showdown!
- RDM Record FINAL
- Ikebukuro Chop 3MAN
- warp 6th anniversary

2005

- Azayakana kūhaku
- wild gun crazy presents crazy感情style
- -Invisible Man's Death Bed sponsored "Sway" release commemorative performance-
- The song of passion vol.1
- new sound moment vol.100
- MOVING ON VOL.8
- CRAZY!To iwanaide! Vol. 2
- about tess+MARZ presents swan song council
- Do You Have TURBO
- Colors seen at the edge of the void 09
- about-tess+MARZ presents swan song council vol.3
- 凛として時雨 record release event "TURBO14"
- seven seas globe
- Yes, i Have TURBO
- Look Up New vol.1

2006

- Oneman Live Ikebukuro Chop
- Tōen'nochikai -vol.4- unplugged
- kinboshi 5

2007

- MOVING ON 14
- FM802 "SONIC STYLE"×Pia Kansai Edition Presents
- McDonald's TOKYO REAL-EYES presents LIVE SUPERNOVA AXDX
- LIQUIDROOM 3rd ANNIVERSARY
- Snail Rail

2008

- TSUTAYA RECORDS presents GO OUT! vol.1
- 小谷美沙子vs凛として時雨
- BTM～Monster Birthday Celebration -road to MONSTER baSH
- Rock on ! music pioneer ～Joy, anger, sorrow, and happiness～ "Ki"
- Mukku shusai event en4
- Nipponia • Nippon
- MONSTER BaSH
- SAKURAZA BREAKER PREMIUM
- CLUB CITTA' 20th Anniversary
- Mono presents RaidWorlds
- KINOSHITA A NIGHT Vol.16 ~fuck you! art~school~
- Fly Like an Eagle

2009

- MAXIMUM SOUND STYLE -evolving the vives of B.F.S
- Hot Stuff 30th anniversary Special Live "out of our heads
- NO GIRL, NO BASSIST ~female bassist band NEXUS~
- New Audiogram ver.3

2011

- HIROSHIMA CLUB QUATTRO 10th ANNIVERSARY

2012

- December's Children

2014

- December's Children

2015

- the telephones presents Last Party ~We are DISCO!!!~

2019

- Hot Stuff Promotion 40th Anniversary
- 9mm Parabellum Bullet~15th anniversary~
- MUCC Presents Trigger In The Box supported by MAVERICK DC GROUP

2020

- 15th anniversary #4 for Extreaming Live Edition

2023

- Tornado Anniversary 2023 ～15m12cm～

2024

- SYNCHRONICITY'24 Wonder Vision
- BIG LOVE VOL.4

2025

- Tornado in Nippon Budokan

=== Festivals ===
2006

- COUNTDOWN JAPAN06'07

2007

- COUNTDOWN JAPAN07'08

2008

- Fuji Rock Festival with Various Artists
- Rising Sun Rock Festival with Various Artists
- Otodama'08
- Nagisa Music Festival 2008 Autumn

2009

- Abaraki Rock Fest.09
- JAPAN STREET CALLING 09
- Summer Sonic Festival with Various Artists
- COUNTDOWN JAPAN09'10

2012

- tv asashi Dream Festival 2012

2014

- FM802 ROCK FESTIVAL RADIO CRAZY 2014

2015

- Lunatic Fest
- Anniversary 10days 2015 PPPPPPPPPP「Perfume FES!! 2015 ～三人祭～」
- tv asashi Dream Festival 2015

2016

- Viva La Rock 2016

2017

- COUNTDOWN JAPAN 17'18

2018

- Viva La Rock 2018
- Summer Sonic
- tv asashi Dream Festival 2018

2019

- Dead Pop Festival

2021

- LOVE MUSIC FESTIVAL 2021

2023

- VIVA LA ROCK 2023
- PSYCHO-FES 10th ANNIVERSARY
- FM802 ROCK FESTIVAL RADIO CRAZY 2023

2024

- tv asashi 65th anniversary Dream Festival 2024
- TOKYO ISLAND 2024
- Hanbredders Autumn Goo-pan Festival Z 2024

2025

- VIVA LA ROCK 2025

=== Other's Tours ===
2005

- pigstar Record TOUR2005

2006

- NOHSHA HAISUI TOUR
- Butterfly Effect Tour

2010

- The Smashing Pumpkins Extra Show with Ling tosite Sigure and 9mm Parabellum Bullet as supporting acts
- Anomaly TOUR2010

2024

- CROSSFAITH DEPARTURE TOUR 2024

2025

- Petit Brabancon CROSS COUNTER -02-

=== Overseas ===
2010

- The Great Escape Festival in UK with Various Artists

2011

- rock'in Taichung 2011

2013

- Dear Perfect - Taipei

2015

- Japan Night in UK with Various Artists

2018

- Five for You – Beijing

2025

- 凛として時雨 TOUR 2025 TATSUMAKI-SENPU Tour in CHINA

== Awards and nominations ==
Year	Award	Category	Work/Nominee	Result
2014	Space Shower Music Video Awards	Best Video	"Enigmatic Feeling"	Nominated
