= Still a Sigure Virgin? =

Studio album by Ling Tosite Sigure
- Released: September 22, 2010
- Recorded: 2010
- Genres: Indie rock; progressive rock; post-hardcore
- Length: 37:10
- Label: Sony Music Associated Records
- Producer: Toru Kitajima

Ling Tosite Sigure chronology
| Just a Moment (2009) | Still a Sigure Virgin? (2010) | I'mperfect (2013) |

Professional ratings
Review scores
| Source | Rating |
|---|---|
| AllMusic | 4/5 stars |

Still a Sigure Virgin? (stylised as still a Sigure virgin?) is Japanese rock band Ling Tosite Sigure's fourth studio album, released on September 22, 2010.

== Promotion ==
In late January 2010, the band began a tour, titled after the first track on the album, "I Was Music." The tour spanned 26 dates, lasting until April 17, however did not feature any new songs, other than "I Was Music." The band also held a four date tour in England in May, featuring two performances at The Great Escape festival in Brighton, and two solo dates in London. After the album's release, the band toured with a 13 date tour in Japan, Virgin Killer, from later October until early December.

Several videos were released to music video channels in promotion of the album. In late March, a special studio live session, Superfinal Sadistic Tornado Vibes, was broadcast on Japanese music channel Space Shower, featuring several new songs from the album. Two music videos were produced for the album, "I Was Music" and "Illusion Is Mine." Daisuke Shimada directed "I Was Music," which was shot in a single take. "Illusion Is Mine" was directed by Yasunori Kakegawa.

Band member Pierre Nakano featured on the October 2010 cover of Rhythm & Drums Magazine, while 345 featured simultaneously on the October copy of Bass Magazine.

== Track listing ==
All tracks written and composed by Toru "TK" Kitajima.

| No. | Title | Length |
|---|---|---|
| 1. | "I was music" | 3:09 |
| 2. | "Secret G" (シークレットＧ Shīkuretto Jī) | 4:10 |
| 3. | "Shandy" (シャンディ Shandi) | 4:30 |
| 4. | "this is is this?" | 4:22 |
| 5. | "a symmetry" | 4:51 |
| 6. | "eF" | 4:48 |
| 7. | "Can you kill a secret?" | 3:08 |
| 8. | "replica" | 4:09 |
| 9. | "illusion is mine" | 4:03 |
| Total length: | | 37:10 |

== Charts ==
| Chart (2010) | Peak position |
|---|---|
| Oricon daily albums | 1 |
| Oricon weekly albums | 1 |

=== Reported sales ===
| Chart | Sales |
|---|---|
| Oricon physical sales | 45,000 |

== Release history ==
| Region | Date | Format |
|---|---|---|
| Japan | September 22, 2010 | CD |
| Japan | October 9, 2010 | Rental CD |
