= Spangle call Lilli line =

Japanese band

- Origin: Shimokitazawa, Japan
- Genres: Post rock, electronica, downtempo
- Years active: 1998–present
- Labels: Felicity, Polystar
- Members: Kana Otsubo (vocals); Ken Fujieda (Guitar); Kiyoaki Sasahara (Guitar)
- Website: www.lilliline.com

Spangle call Lilli line (スパングル・コール・リリ・ライン) is a three-member Japanese band, formed in 1998 in Shimokitazawa.

== Discography ==
=== Studio albums ===
- Spangle call Lilli line (March 25, 2001)
- Nanae (November 10, 2002)
- or (June 11, 2003)
- TRACE (April 20, 2005)
- ISOLATION (September 24, 2008)
- PURPLE (November 12, 2008)
- VIEW (April 21, 2010)
- forest at the head of a river (June 23, 2010)
- New Season (September 7, 2011)
- ghost is dead (November 11, 2015)
- Dreams Never End (January 9, 2019)
- Remember (March 3, 2021)
- Ampersand (January 25, 2023)
- lull (September 2, 2026)

=== Singles ===
- "nano" (April 9, 2003)
- "dreamer" (March 17, 2010)
- "mio" (December 19, 2018)
- "lean forward" (June 17, 2022)
- "silence" (February 18, 2026)

=== Extended plays ===
- WS (with Windy Hill) (July 20, 2001)
- FOR INSTALLATION (June 29, 2005)

=== Live albums ===
- 68 SCLL (March 17, 2004)
- SCLL LIVE (DVD) (August 5, 2009)

=== Compilations ===
- SINCE (album) (October 25, 2006)
- SINCE2 (album) (June 12, 2013)
