= Echo (Nothing's Carved in Stone album) =

Studio album by Nothing's Carved in Stone
- Released: June 8, 2011
- Genre: Alternative rock
- Length: 54:21
- Label: Dynamord; GUDY-2008

Nothing's Carved in Stone chronology
Sands of Time (2010)	Echo (2011)	Silver Sun (2012)

Echo is a 2011 album by the Japanese rock band Nothing's Carved in Stone released on June 8, 2011.

== Track listing ==
All music is composed by Nothing's Carved in Stone.

CD
No.	Title	Length
1.	"Material Echo"	1:14
2.	"Truth"	4:21
3.	"Falling Pieces"	4:31
4.	"Spiralbreak"	4:21
5.	"Chain Reaction"	4:29
6.	"False Alarm"	3:26
7.	"Seasons of Me"	4:22
8.	"My Ground"	5:24
9.	"9 Beat"	3:53
10.	"Everlasting Youth"	4:21
11.	"Goodnight & Goodluck"	4:20
12.	"TRANS.AM"	4:29
13.	"To Where My Shoe Points"	7:10
