= Parallel Lives (album) =

Studio album by Nothing's Carved in Stone
- Released: May 6, 2009
- Recorded: 2009
- Genre: Alternative rock
- Length: 50:30
- Label: Growing Up Inc; ZEDY-2024

Nothing's Carved in Stone chronology
Parallel Lives (2009)	Sands of Time (2009)

Parallel Lives is a 2009 album by the Japanese rock band Nothing's Carved in Stone released on May 6, 2009. It reached No. 11 on the Japanese Oricon album charts.

== Track listing ==
All music is composed by Nothing's Carved in Stone

CD
No.	Title	Length
1.	"Isolation"	4:44
2.	"Silent Shades"	3:39
3.	"Same Circle"	4:11
4.	"November 15th"	4:08
5.	"Hand In Hand"	5:17
6.	"Moving In Slow-Motion"	3:12
7.	"Diachronic"	5:04
8.	"Thermograffiti"	3:23
9.	"New Day"	4:38
10.	"Words That Bind Us"	4:22
11.	"Sleepless Youth"	3:23
12.	"Tribal Session"	2:41
13.	"End"	1:56
