= Silver Sun (Nothing's Carved in Stone album) =

Studio album by Nothing's Carved in Stone
- Released: August 15, 2012
- Genre: Alternative rock
- Length: 49:44
- Label: Epic Records Japan; ESCL-3945

Nothing's Carved in Stone chronology
Echo (2011)	Silver Sun (2012)	Revolt (2013)

Singles from Silver Sun
- 1. "Pride" Released: July 18, 2012; 2. "Spirit Inspiration" Released: November 28, 2012

Silver Sun is a 2012 album by the Japanese rock band Nothing's Carved in Stone released on August 15, 2012.

== Track listing ==
All music is composed by Nothing's Carved in Stone.

CD
No.	Title	Length
1.	"Spirit Inspiration"	4:21
2.	"Hakuchū" (白昼; Broad Daylight)	4:07
3.	"PUPA"	3:52
4.	"Advance Forward"	4:10
5.	"Terminal"	3:58
6.	"Red Light"	4:19
7.	"The Big Chill"	3:41
8.	"Inside Out"	5:04
9.	"Scarred Soul"	3:52
10.	"Sequel"	2:48
11.	"Pride"	4:40
12.	"The Silver Sun Rise Up High"	4:52
