= Around the Clock (song) =

Nothing's Carved in Stone song

Single by Nothing's Carved in Stone
- Released: December 9, 2009
- Genre: Alternative rock
- Length: 22:44
- Label: Dynamord; ZEDY-1012
- Songwriters: Shinichi Ubukata, Takanori Ohkita, Hidekazu Hinata, Taku Muramatsu

Nothing's Carved in Stone singles chronology
| "Around the Clock" (2009) | "'Pride'" (2012) |

"Around the Clock" is a single by the Japanese rock band Nothing's Carved in Stone released on December 9, 2009. It peaked at number 21 on the Oricon charts.

== Track listing ==
All music is composed by Nothing's Carved in Stone.

CD
| No. | Title | Length |
|---|---|---|
| 1. | "Around the Clock" | 4:07 |
| 2. | "Bone Age" | 4:29 |
| 3. | "The Swim" | 3:45 |
| 4. | "Isolation (Live at Space Shower Sweet Love Shower 2009 < 2009.08.29 >)" | 4:43 |
| 5. | "Tribal Session～End (Live at Ebisu Liquidroom < 2009.07.15 >)" | 5:40 |
