= Nothing's Carved in Stone =

Japanese rock band

- Also known as: NCIS
- Origin: Japan
- Genres: Punk rock; alternative rock
- Years active: 2009–present
- Labels: Dynamord Label (2009–2012); Epic Records Japan (2012–2015); Dynamord Label (2015–2018); Silver Sun Records (2018–present)
- Members: Shinichi Ubukata; Takanori Ohkita; Hidekazu Hinata; Taku Muramatsu
- Website: NCIS.jp

Nothing's Carved in Stone is a Japanese rock band formed in January 2009. After Ellegarden decided to go into hiatus in 2008, the group's guitarist Shinichi Ubukata created Nothing's Carved in Stone as his solo project. Their debut album Parallel Lives was released on May 6, 2009, debuting at No. 11 on the Japanese Oricon weekly album charts.

== History ==
In 2008, the popular pop punk group Ellegarden announced that they would enter an indefinite hiatus. Guitarist Shinichi Ubukata used the break as an opportunity to start a new band called Nothing's Carved In Stone. He quickly recruited Hidekazu Hinata of Straightener to be his new bassist and Takanori "Oniy" Ohkita from FULLARMOR to join on drums, and they began holding sessions together. However, the band struggled to find a vocalist for nearly half a year. They eventually settled on Taku Muramatsu, the singer of an indie rock band called ABSTRACT MASH, who Ubukata discovered through his band's Myspace. After showing his bandmates a few videos, Ubukata and Ohkita attended one of ABSTRACT MASH's lives and, charmed by Muramatsu's performance, convinced him to join the band.

Nothing's Carved In Stone moved quickly after their line-up was complete, playing their first live on February 27 at Daikanyama UNIT. Their debut album, Parallel Lives, was released on May 6, 2009 and was followed by two nationwide tours. The album went on to reach the eleventh spot on the Oricon charts. Nothing's Carved In Stone also firmly announced their presence on the Japanese rock scene that year with performances at high-profile events like the SWEET LOVE SHOWER, SUMMER SONIC and the ROCK IN JAPAN FESTIVAL.

Not even waiting for their debut year to end, the band released their first single, "Around The Clock", in December 2009. Their first concert DVD, Initial Lives arrived on the same day, documenting the band's powerful live performances and strong camaraderie between its members.

2010 brought the album Sands of Time, a similarly-named tour and several festival appearances. The tour was likewise documented with a DVD entitled Time of Justice, which was released in December like its predecessor.

Continuing this trend of intense productivity, the band's third album, Echo, was released on June 8, 2011 and followed by a twenty-one date one-man tour. They also performed at more festivals, including the RISING SUN ROCK FESTIVAL and ARABAKI ROCK FEST, and opened shows for artists such as Miyavi and J. Also, after the 2011 Tōhoku earthquake and tsunami, Ubukata joined up with several other musicians from the Japanese alternative rock scene, under the leadership of AA= frontman Takeshi Ueda, to form the temporary unit AA= AiD. Together, they recorded the charity song "We're not alone", which was made available for free download for a year to help encourage fans to act to support the reconstruction efforts.

2012 was a breakthrough year for Nothing's Carved In Stone. July saw the band release their second single Pride, which was used as the theme to the anime series Kingdom. They also inked a deal with the major label Epic Records Japan, and their major debut Silver Sun was released on August 15, 2012. Their third single "Spirit Inspiration" was also selected to be the opening theme the anime Zetsuen no Tempest, earning the band more international exposure.

The next year saw the band continue their string of successful tie-up songs, as their single "Out of Control" was selected to be the second opening theme of the hit anime Psycho-Pass. Following the release of their fifth album, Revolt, in June 2013, Nothing's Carved In Stone released a new single in December.

== Band members ==
- Shinichi Ubukata (生形 真一, Ubukata Shin'ichi) – guitarist, backing vocals
- Takanori Ohkita (大喜多 崇規, Ōkita Takanori) – drummer
- Taku Muramatsu (村松 拓, Muramatsu Taku) – vocals, guitarist
- Hidekazu Hinata (日向 秀和, Hinata Hidekazu) – bassist

== Discography ==
=== Studio albums ===
Year	Album details	Oricon charts
2009	Parallel Lives: Released: May 6, 2009	11
2010	Sands of Time: Released: June 9, 2010	14
2011	Echo: Released: June 8, 2011	14
2012	Silver Sun: Major record label debut; Released: August 15, 2012	11
2013	Revolt: Released: June 26, 2013	17
2014	Strangers In Heaven: Released: August 6, 2014	10
2015	MAZE: Released: September 16, 2015	8
2016	Existence: Released: December 14, 2016	13
2018	Mirror Ocean: Released: February 14, 2018	11
2019	By Your Side: Released: September 25, 2019	19
2020	Futures: Released: August 26, 2020	22
2021	Answer: Released: December 1, 2021	17
2026	Fire Inside Us: Released: March 4, 2026	23

=== Live albums ===
Year	Album details	Oricon charts
2015	Enkan -ENCORE- (円環-ENCORE-, Arena Encore): Released: August 19, 2015	12

=== EPs ===
Year	EP details	Oricon charts
2024	Brightness: Released: May 15, 2024	16

=== Singles ===
Year	Title	Oricon charts	Billboard Japan Hot 100
2009	"Around The Clock": Released: December 9, 2009	21	—
2012	"Pride": Released: July 18, 2012	33	—
2012	"Spirit Inspiration": Released: November 28, 2012	22	—
2013	"Out of Control": Released: March 6, 2013	9	—
2013	"Tsubame Kurimuzon" (ツバメクリムゾン, Crimson Swallow): Released: December 18, 2013	18	—
2015	"Gravity": Released: January 14, 2015	14	22
2016	"In Future": Released: April 6, 2016	22	65
2016	"Adventures": Released: November 2, 2016	37	—
2019	"Beginning": Released: May 29, 2019	26	—

=== DVDs ===
Year	Title	Oricon charts
2009	Initial Lives: Released: December 9, 2009	37
2010	Time of Justice: Released: December 22, 2010	79
2013	A Silver Film: Released: January 30, 2013	28
2015	No Longer Strangers: Released: January 14, 2015	15
2016	Nothing's Carved In Stone Live at 野音: Released: September 28, 2016	18
2018	Live on November 15, 2017 at TOYOSU PIT: Released: March 14, 2018	—

== See also ==
- Ellegarden
- The Hiatus
- Straightener (band)
