= Psycho-Pass =

Japanese cyberpunk anime television series

- Key visual of the series

PSYCHO-PASS サイコパス (Saiko Pasu)
- Genre: Crime; Cyberpunk; Psychological thriller
- Created by: Gen Urobuchi
- Anime television series
- Directed by: Naoyoshi Shiotani; Katsuyuki Motohiro
- Produced by: George Wada; Kenji Tobori; Wakana Okamura
- Written by: Gen Urobuchi; Makoto Fukami; Aya Takaha
- Music by: Yugo Kanno
- Studio: Production I.G
- Licensed by: Crunchyroll
- Original network: Fuji TV (Noitamina)
- English network: US: Crunchyroll Channel
- Original run: October 12, 2012 – March 22, 2013
- Episodes: 22
- Light novel
- Written by: Makoto Fukami
- Published by: Mag Garden
- Original run: February 4, 2013 – April 4, 2013
- Volumes: 2
- Sequels
- Psycho-Pass 2 (2014); Psycho-Pass 3 (2019)
- Anime films
- Psycho-Pass: The Movie (2015); Psycho-Pass: Sinners of the System (2019 trilogy); Psycho-Pass 3: First Inspector (2020); Psycho-Pass Providence (2023)
- Manga
- Kanshikan Tsunemori Akane (2012–2014); Inspector Shinya Kogami (2014–2017)
- icon

Psycho-Pass (Note: The original Japanese title is in the Latin script. Officially, the katakana Saiko Pasu (Japanese: サイコパス) is added beside it as ruby text to correspond with Japanese phonology.) (stylized in all caps) is a Japanese cyberpunk psychological thriller anime television series produced by Production I.G. It was co-directed by Naoyoshi Shiotani and Katsuyuki Motohiro and written by Gen Urobuchi, with character designs by Akira Amano and featuring music by Yugo Kanno. The series aired on Fuji TV's Noitamina programming block between October 2012 and March 2013. Set in a dystopia of Sibyl System's governance of Japan, the plot follows the young woman Akane Tsunemori. She is introduced as a novice Inspector assigned to Division One of the Public Safety Bureau's Criminal Investigation Division, in charge of solving crimes with latent criminals, Enforcers.

Psycho-Pass originated from Production I.G.'s interest in making a successor to Mamoru Oshii's achievements. Chief director Katsuyuki Motohiro aimed to explore psychological themes in society's youth using dystopian storylines. Multiple books and movies influenced Psycho-Pass, the most notable being the 1982 American science fiction film Blade Runner. The series was licensed by Funimation in North America. Several manga and novels, including an adaptation and prequels to the original story, have been published. An episodic video game adaptation called Chimi Chara Psycho-Pass was developed by Nitroplus staffers in collaboration with Production I.G. New novels and another manga were serialized in 2014.

The first season of the anime garnered critical acclaim in both Japan and the West, with critics praising the characters' roles and interactions set within the dystopian environment. The animation has also been praised despite issues in latter episodes which required fixing in the DVD volumes of the series.

A second season aired between October and December 2014, with a feature film titled, Psycho-Pass: The Movie released in January 2015. In 2019, Psycho-Pass: Sinners of the System premiered between January and March. A third season aired between October and December 2019, with a sequel film, Psycho-Pass 3: First Inspector, released in March 2020. A new anime film titled Psycho-Pass Providence was released in May 2023. All of the stories take place in an authoritarian future dystopia where omnipresent public sensors continuously scan the mental states of every passing citizen in order to determine their criminal propensity.

== Synopsis ==
=== Setting ===
Psycho-Pass is set in a futuristic Japan governed by the Sibyl System (シビュラシステム, Shibyura Shisutemu), a powerful biomechatronic computer network which continually monitors the psychological traits of Japanese citizens using a "cymatic scan." The resulting psychometric assessment is called a Psycho-Pass (サイコパス, Saikopasu), which includes a numeric Crime Coefficient (犯罪係数, Hanzaikeisū) index, revealing the citizen's criminality potential, and a color-coded Hue, alerting law enforcement to other data, as well as the improvement (clearing) or decline (clouding) of said Psycho-Pass. When a targeted individual's Crime Coefficient index exceeds the accepted threshold (100), they are pursued, apprehended, and either arrested or killed by the field officers of the Crime Investigation Department of the Ministry of Welfare's Public Safety Bureau.

Elite officers known as Inspectors research and evaluate crime scenes, including all personnel involved, with the assistance of Enforcers. Enforcers are latent criminals charged with protecting the Inspectors, adding their expertise and carrying out Inspectors' instructions. Both are equipped with personally activated hand-held weapons called "Dominators" whose integrated scanners provide the target's immediate Psycho-Pass. The gun-like weapon can only fire when approved by the Sibyl System and triggered by its owner. Inspectors and Enforcers work as a team, though Inspectors have jurisdiction to fire their Dominators on the Enforcers should they pose a danger to the public or the Inspectors themselves.

=== Plot ===
Psycho-Pass is seen through the eyes of Akane Tsunemori, a rookie Inspector within Unit One (aka Division One) of the Ministry of Welfare Public Safety Bureau's Criminal Investigation Department. Shinya Kogami is an Enforcer under her watch during her first mission. When she judges him a threat to an apprehended criminal's life, she uses her Dominator to prevent him from decomposing the criminal. Initially ashamed of her action, Kogami thanks her for preventing what could be perceived as murder, an opinion which influences Tsunemori to stay on the force. The unit uncovers the crimes of Shogo Makishima, a prolific criminal mastermind. Makishima is Criminally Asymptomatic (免罪体質, Menzai Taishitsu) – a person persistently assessed by the Sibyl System as having a low crime coefficient despite all actions and attitudes, thus protecting him from Dominator harm. Tsunemori is accompanied by veteran Inspector Nobuchika Ginoza, a strict man who looks down on Enforcers; Tomomi Masaoka, a middle-aged Enforcer who used to be a detective; Shusei Kagari, a carefree young man who was marked as a latent criminal in childhood; and Yayoi Kunizuka, a former musician turned into a latent criminal stemming from a relationship with a terrorist.

The unit starts hunting Makishima, but it is Kogami who is most invested, having lost a friend at the hands of the villain. Meanwhile, Makishima is invited by Joshu Kasei, the android form of Sibyl, to join their ranks. He refuses and flees. Realizing this, Kogami leaves Unit One to find and kill him. The Sibyl System orders Tsunemori to capture Makishima and execute Kogami, but she agrees only on the condition that they withdraw the execution order for Kogami. Unit One now searches for both men with Kogami learning that Makishima plans to make biological terrorism and sends the data to his data. Upon finding him, Makishima attacks Masaoka and kills him when attempting to murder his son, Ginoza, with dynamite. Kogami spots and wounds Makishima but he is stopped by Tsunemori. He agrees to work together but when Makishima attempts to kill Tsunemori, Kogami uses Masaoka's gun to kill Makishima. In the epilogue, Ginoza has become an Enforcer after experiencing his father's death with Tsunemori becoming the new leader as she welcomes Inspector Mika Shimotsuki. Meanwhile, Kogami is last seen on a ship.

== Production ==
=== Development ===
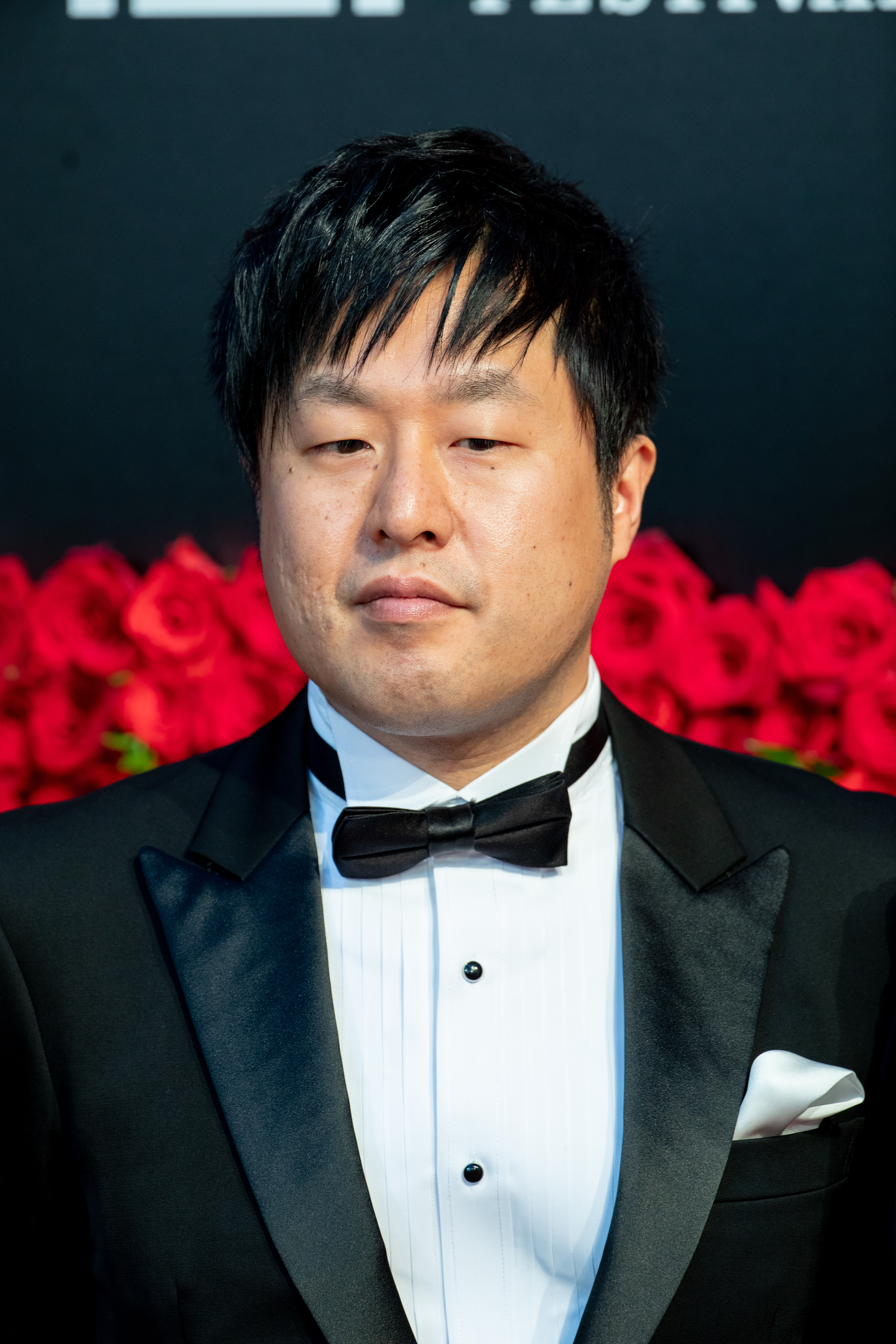
Director Naoyoshi Shiotani

The series was directed by Naoyoshi Shiotani, written by Gen Urobuchi and features character designs by Reborn! manga artist Akira Amano. It stars Tomokazu Seki as Shinya Kogami, Kana Hanazawa as Akane Tsunemori, and Takahiro Sakurai as Shogo Makishima. Psycho-Pass originated from Production I.G.'s interest in making a successor to Mamoru Oshii's Ghost in the Shell and Patlabor, hiring Katsuyuki Motohiro—who became the series' chief director—and veteran I.G. animator Naoyoshi Shiotani to supervise direction.

Motohiro wanted to return to making anime after a long hiatus but he needed a charismatic script writer. Motohiro and his staff were surprised with Gen Urobuchi's contribution to the highly acclaimed anime series, Puella Magi Madoka Magica. Motohiro was fascinated by Madoka Magica and he had read other works by Urobuchi, which persuaded him to talk to Urobuchi. In early 2011, Motohiro proposed to Urobuchi that the pair should work together. Early in the making of the series, Motohiro told Naoyoshi Shiotani not to make anything that could not be adapted into a live-action film.

Before work on Psycho-Pass started, Shiotani was busy working on the film, Blood-C: The Last Dark. As soon as his work with the film ended, Shiotani focused on the series' quality. After episode 16, which proved to be the most challenging and popular of the series, the team found themselves "out of stamina." The next two episodes were made by an outside team, which is reflected in several problems with the animation. In response to this, the producer of the episode said that while he expected problems, he worked to make it the best he could. Shiotani also apologized for the episode's quality. The original team continued working from episode 19 on until the finale, deciding to remake episodes 17 and 18 for their retail release. The anime series was first announced in late March 2012 by Fuji TV at its Noitamina press conference.

=== Design ===
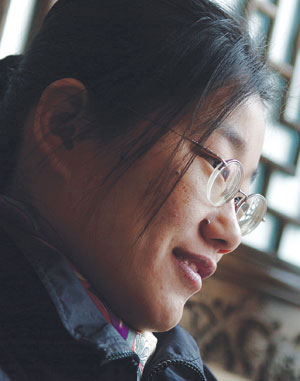
Sketches of Shinya Kogami (left) by Akira Amano (right). The staff avoided using colors that would stand out.

When hearing the comments from Atsuko Ishizuka, director of The Pet Girl of Sakurasou, about the way the characters were first designed, Shiotani realized it was the opposite for his team, who had to create the setting first, then the characters because they "are almost being played by the world." As a result, the characters were designed by manga artist Akira Amano to balance the dark atmosphere by having them "palatable and very relatable." The staff avoided using bright colors that would stand out. Akane Tsunemori was created as the most relatable character, who would question the setting from the audience's point of view and as the heroine who would come between the main character, Shinya Kogami, and his main rival, and enemy, Shogo Makishima. Akane's progression from an innocent newcomer to a mature and haunted person was one of the staff's main objectives.

Motohiro allowed his team to use very graphic elements, even though they could reduce female viewership. He acknowledged that the series may be too violent for a younger demographic and said that he would not want his son to watch it because of its psychological brutality. He added that the team did not want to make a violent series but an "artistic series that just happened to have some violence included in it". About the amount of violence, Shiotani told Urobuchi, "just let us deal with it." Some of these violent scenes occur off-camera but whenever a protagonist was involved, the moment was developed to be memorable. The team twice had to remake scenes because the television station complained that they went "overboard."

Motohiro wanted the series to counter concurrent anime trends. The use of moe (slang) was banned at staff meetings because they appreciated dramas like Mobile Suit Gundam and Patlabor that focused on conflicts between male characters. As the series was "anti-moe," the team decided to avoid having Tsunemori remove her clothes and instead had Kogami do it. Nevertheless, the show attracted a female viewership because the conflict between the male characters appeared to attract the shonen ai genre fans. Although Shiotani also wanted the series to avoid romance between male characters, he believed the fight scenes between male characters unintentionally attracted female fans. The staff decided to focus on friendships rather than romantic relationships.

=== Influences ===
The series was inspired by several Western films, most notably L.A. Confidential. Director Naoyoshi Shiotani cited several other influences, including Minority Report, Gattaca, Brazil and Blade Runner; the latter of which he compared very closely to Psycho-Pass. Before the making of the series, Urobuchi insisted on using a Philip K. Dick-inspired, dystopian narrative. The psychological themes were based on the time Shiotani watched Lupin III during his childhood because he thought about adding "today's youth trauma" to the series. The rivalry between the main characters was based on the several dramas the staff liked. Other voice actors have been credited in the making of the series because of the ways they added traits to the characters.

=== Music ===
The staff had problems composing an opening theme for the series until someone provided some music by Ling Tosite Sigure, who was engaged to compose the opening theme. Egoist, who composed the ending theme, had debuted on Noitamina with Guilty Crown. Shiotani said they asked Egoist to record three versions of the ending theme so they could alternate them to match the episode's ending. Across the series, time limits resulted in the ending songs being removed or replaced with instrumental versions to avoid cutting scenes from the episode. When there were concerns from the producers of the songs, Tomohiro and Shiotani discussed this with them. Following the first series, Yugo Kanno made remixes of the original background themes as the staff found them enjoyable and might come across as appealing in the process.

Two Psycho-Pass CDs were included in the second and fifth Japanese home media release of the series. The Psycho Pass original soundtrack was released by Sony Music Entertainment on May 29, 2013. It features fifty-five tracks composed by Kanno. The second original soundtrack was released on March 18, 2015. A two-volume drama CD called Namae no nai kaibutsu (名前のない怪物; lit. "The Monster with no Name") based on the prequel novel was released between September 25 and November 27, 2013.

Psycho-Pass Complete Original Soundtrack

Disk 1
No.	Title	Writer(s)	Length
1.	"Psycho-Pass" (PSYCHO-PASS)	Yugo Kanno	6:42
2.	"Hou to Chitsujo [Law and Order]" (法と秩序)	Yugo Kanno	2:40
3.	"Senzaihan [Latent Criminal]" (潜在犯)	Yugo Kanno	2:14
4.	"Dominator" (ドミネーター)	Yugo Kanno	3:13
5.	"Psycho-Hazard" (サイコハザード)	Yugo Kanno	2:55
6.	"Hikari [Light]" (光)	Yugo Kanno	2:21
7.	"Hanzai Keisū [Crime Coefficient]" (犯罪係数)	Yugo Kanno	2:02
8.	"Haiki Kukaku [Abolition Block]" (廃棄区画)	Yugo Kanno	2:00
9.	"Yogensha [Prophet]" (預言者)	Yugo Kanno	1:40
10.	"Kansatsugan [All-Seeing Eyes]" (観察眼)	Yugo Kanno	2:04
11.	"Keiji no Kan [Detective's Intuition]" (刑事の勘)	Yugo Kanno	1:50
12.	"Hanzai Yūgi [Crime Games]" (犯罪遊戯)	Yugo Kanno	2:33
13.	"Shibyura no Kairai [Sibyl's Puppets]" (シビュラの傀儡)	Yugo Kanno	1:44
14.	"Checkmate" (チェックメイト)	Yugo Kanno	1:45
15.	"Inochi no Arikata [Life's Theory]" (命の在り方)	Yugo Kanno	3:55
16.	"Dare mo Shiranai Anata no Kamen [Nobody Knows Your Mask]" (誰も知らないあなたの仮面)	Yugo Kanno	1:44
17.	"Amai Doku [Sweet Poison]" (甘い毒)	Yugo Kanno	2:39
18.	"Seishin Kouzou [Mental Structure]" (精神構造)	Yugo Kanno	1:40
19.	"Sono Jūkou Ha, Seigi wo Shihai Suru [Justice From the Barrel of a Gun]" (その銃口は、正義を支配する)	Yugo Kanno	5:26
20.	"Shihai to Kenryoku [Domination and Power]" (支配と権力)	Yugo Kanno	3:13
21.	"Makishima Shōgo" (槙島聖護)	Yugo Kanno	3:26
22.	"Trigger Finger!!!"	Yugo Kanno	2:19
Total length:			60:16

Disk 2 (+ Bonus Track)
No.	Title	Writer(s)	Length
1.	"Psycho-Pass Symphony" (PSYCHO-PASS Symphony)	Yugo Kanno	6:43
2.	"Sibyl System" (シビュラシステム)	Yugo Kanno	4:25
3.	"Borderline" (ボーダーライン)	Yugo Kanno	1:48
4.	"Inochi no Omomi to Songen [Importance of Life and Dignity]" (命の重みと尊厳)	Yugo Kanno	2:27
5.	"Hito no Kokoro [Heart of Mankind]" (人の心)	Yugo Kanno	1:12
6.	"Kouankyoku Keijika Ichikakari [CID Division 1]" (公安局刑事課一係)	Yugo Kanno	1:53
7.	"Ryouken no Kyūkaku [A Hound's Sense of Smell]" (猟犬の嗅覚)	Yugo Kanno	1:40
8.	"Ryouken no Shūsei [The Habits of a Hound]" (猟犬の習性)	Yugo Kanno	2:10
9.	"Rakuen [Paradise]" (楽園)	Yugo Kanno	2:23
10.	"Shintaku [Oracle]" (神託)	Yugo Kanno	2:07
11.	"Seija no Bansan [Saint's Supper]" (聖者の晩餐)	Yugo Kanno	2:18
12.	"Chitsujo [Order]" (秩序)	Yugo Kanno	1:50
13.	"Kami no Ishiki [God's Omniscience]" (神の意識)	Yugo Kanno	3:09
14.	"Gūzou [Idol]" (偶像)	Yugo Kanno	1:43
15.	"Menzai Taishitsu [Criminally Asymptomatic]" (免罪体質)	Yugo Kanno	2:17
16.	"Mujun ni Michita Sekai [A World of Contradictions]" (矛盾に満ちた世界)	Yugo Kanno	4:07
17.	"Kyouhaku Kannen [Obsession]" (強迫観念)	Yugo Kanno	2:28
18.	"Lemonade Candy" (レモネードキャンディ)	Yugo Kanno	0:34
19.	"Hologram" (ホログラム)	Yugo Kanno	1:37
20.	"Seishin no Ekibyou [Plague of Spirit]" (精神の疫病)	Yugo Kanno	2:05
21.	"Shoki Shoudou [Initial Impulse]" (初期衝動)	Yugo Kanno	2:09
22.	"Yuruginai Shinnen [Enduring Convictions]" (揺ぎない信念)	Yugo Kanno	3:03
23.	"Nozomi [Desire/Hope]" (望み)	Yugo Kanno	2:22

No.	Title	Writer(s)	Length
24.	"abnormalize (TV edit)" (abnormalize [TV edit])	TK from Ling Tosite Sigure	1:32
25.	"Namae no Nai Kaibutsu (TV edit 92s ver.)" (名前のない怪物 [TV Edit 92s ver])	ryo	1:42
26.	"Out of Control" (Out of Control -アニメバージョン-)	Nothing's Carved in Stone	1:34
27.	"All Alone With You (TV edit)" (All Alone With You [TV Edit])	ryo	1:30
Total length:			63:01

Disk 3
No.	Title	Writer(s)	Length
1.	"[Psycho-Pass] non-credit opening movie" (「Psycho-Pass サイコパス」non-credit opening movie)	Ling Tosite Sigure
2.	"[Psycho-Pass] ending non-credit movie [Night version]" (「Psycho-Pass サイコパス」Ending ノンクレジットムービー <Night version>)	Egoist
3.	"[Psycho-Pass] ending non-credit movie [Day version]" (「Psycho-Pass サイコパス」Ending ノンクレジットムービー <Day version>)	Egoist
4.	"[Psycho-Pass] opening non-credit movie [Mad version]" (「Psycho-Pass サイコパス」Opening ノンクレジットムービー <Mad version>)	Nothing's Carved in Stone
5.	"[Psycho-Pass] opening non-credit movie [Final version]" (「Psycho-Pass サイコパス」Opening ノンクレジットムービー <Final version>)	Nothing's Carved in Stone
6.	"[Psycho-Pass] ending non-credit movie" (「Psycho-Pass サイコパス」Ending ノンクレジットムービー)	Egoist

== Themes and analysis ==
As some critics have noted, Psycho-Pass explores societal and psychological themes, such as the price of living without stress or fear of crime. Indeed, the Sibyl System targets individuals who are considering performing actions that might cause stress to others. This raises the question of whether it is morally and socially acceptable to charge individuals with crimes they have not yet committed. An example of this occurs in the first episode when a woman is kidnapped and the resultant trauma causes her Psycho-Pass to become clouded. According to Sibyl's rules, the police can decompose her, but Tsunemori delays action, choosing to bring the woman's Psycho-Pass level back to the acceptable range by speaking gently to her. This challenges the notion that the potential to commit a crime correlates with actually committing a crime. According to Anime News Network, "We are all capable of doing bad things at times—should we be punished because we thought of hurting someone before we act on it? Or because we were victims? It really all comes back to that first episode and Akane's reaction to the victim who presented as a violent criminal".

Psycho-Pass further questions the notion of overriding the individual's needs in favor of general social value by asking the audience to consider if it is morally and socially acceptable to kill individuals who may potentially commit crimes so long as we accept that the harm caused to society outweighs the harm caused to an individual who is falsely charged. In other words, the Sibyl System operates on the principles of opportunity cost and acceptable risk. Relying on the Sibyl System paradoxically creates a society which fears no crime as a whole, but individuals who personally fear the consequences of the Sibyl System's verdicts. Urobuchi himself has said that one of the series' central thematic ideas is "fear." Shogo Makishima's actions stem from feeling out of place because the Sibyl System cannot accept him as he is, labeling him a deviant within the structure of society itself.

Emotional repression is another theme explored in Psycho-Pass. The identification of latent criminals is partially based on the emotions judged by society to be negative, such as sadness or anger, being scanned by the Sibyl System. Kotaku states, "because of these scans, Psycho-Pass shows an interesting future where 'mental beauty' is as sought after as physical beauty. It is also a future where the police's job is little more than to watch the latent criminals they control—because if they did any real detective work, they might start to think like the criminals they are trying to catch and thus become latent criminals themselves." Many of the main characters feel nostalgia throughout the series. The many references to older literature, philosophy, music and theater create a "nostalgic world building for a time before psycho-passes".

== Media ==
=== Anime ===
==== TV series ====
The anime series produced by Production I.G. was broadcast in Japan on Fuji TV's Noitamina programming block between October 12, 2012, and March 22, 2013. Toho started releasing the series on DVD and Blu-ray formats on December 21, 2012. The eighth and final volume was released on July 26, 2013. Funimation licensed the series in North America and simulcast it on its website, first in Japanese, then weekly in English. Psycho-Pass was one of three initial shows aired as a Funimation "broadcast dub." A home media released in March 2014. In the United Kingdom, the series is licensed by Manga Entertainment and in Australia by Madman Entertainment.

On July 6, 2013, Production I.G. president Mitsuhisa Ishikawa said at Anime Expo that production on a second season had begun. The second season, titled Psycho-Pass 2, began airing in October 2014; the film was released in January 2015. Before the debut broadcast of the second season, the first season—condensed into 11 one-hour episodes with some added scenes— began airing in July 2014. The fourth episode was cancelled due to similarities with a real life murder. Director Naoyoshi Shiotani apologized for this in his Twitter account. Nevertheless, Funimation streamed the episode. A Blu-ray box set was announced with a scheduled release on October 15, 2014. This set contains both the original first season broadcast and the edited one-hour rerun episodes.

The second series aired on Fuji TV's Noitamina programming block between October 10 and December 19, 2014. The series was collected in a total of five DVD and Blu-ray volumes between December 17, 2014, and April 15, 2015.

On March 8, 2019, a third season was announced. The third season aired on Fuji TV's Noitamina programming block between October 24 and December 12, 2019, with a special program being aired on October 17, 2019. Amazon streamed the series inside and outside of Japan on their Amazon Prime Video service. Naoyoshi Shiotani returned as director, Akira Amano as character designer, and Production I.G. as animation producer. It consisted of eight episodes with each episode being 45 minutes long.

On June 12, 2015, the Chinese Ministry of Culture announced that they forbade the release of Psycho-Pass along with 38 other anime and manga titles which were deemed to "include scenes of violence, pornography, terrorism and crimes against public morality that could potentially incite minors to commit such acts."

==== Films ====
In September 2013, it was announced on the official site of Noitamina that a second season and a new-original theatrical film project was in development, later called Psycho-Pass: The Movie. The film was rated R15+ due to its strong violence which includes murder and human bodily damage. In September 2014, the release date was announced for January 9, 2015, with Urobuchi and Fukami co-scripting. A 30-second trailer streamed on Nico Nico Douga on September 5, 2013, showing Kogami, Tsunemori and Ginoza. A two-minute trailer, the second promotional video for the film, was released in September 2013, containing footage from the original anime television series. In February 2016, Funimation released a preview for the dubbed version and announced that the film will run in over 100 theaters in the United States and Canada. The theme song was performed by Ling Tosite Sigure.

In March 2018, it was announced in the live stream of Fuji TV that a three-part theatrical film project was in development, titled Psycho-Pass: Sinners of the System. The first film, titled Case.1 Tsumi to Bachi (Case.1 罪と罰), premiered on January 25, 2019. The second film, titled Case.2 First Guardian, premiered on February 15, 2019. The third film, titled Case.3 Onshū no Kanata ni, premiered on March 8, 2019. Naoyoshi Shiotani and Yugo Kanno reprised their roles as the director and music composer, respectively. Ryō Yoshigami wrote the screenplay for the first film, while Fukami returned from the anime series to write the screenplays for the second and third films. Production I.G returned for animation production and Toho distributed.

A collaboration visual with Godzilla: City on the Edge of Battle has also been developed with Tsunemori being the Psycho-Pass character used.

After the final episode of the third season, it was announced that the series would receive a sequel film titled Psycho-Pass 3: First Inspector, with the staff and cast returned from the third season. The film premiered on March 27, 2020.

On August 14, 2022, it was announced that the series would receive a new anime film titled Psycho-Pass Providence, to commemorate the series' 10th anniversary. Naoyoshi Shiotani returned to direct the film at Production I.G. The film was released on May 12, 2023.

=== Manga ===
A manga adaptation illustrated by Hikaru Miyoshi, titled Kanshikan Tsunemori Akane (監視官 常守朱; Inspector Akane Tsunemori), began serialization in Shueisha's Jump Square magazine from November 2, 2012. Its first tankōbon volume was released by Shueisha on February 4, 2013. In November 2013, it was announced that 380,000 copies of the manga were shipped in Japan with three volumes. The manga had over 1 million copies in print by December 2014.

Another manga titled Psycho-Pass: Inspector Shinya Kogami (監視官 狡噛 慎也, Kanshikan Kōgami Shinya) premiered in the August issue of Mag Garden's Monthly Comic Blade magazine on June 30, 2014. Natsuo Sai illustrated the series written by Midori Gotou and produced by Production I.G. The manga has been published by Dark Horse Comics in North America since November 9, 2016.

=== Novels ===
A novelization of the series by Makoto Fukami was published by Mag Garden in two volumes released on February 4 and April 4, 2013. Shiotani said the novels were more violent than the television series. A prequel titled Namae no Nai Kaibutsu (名前のない怪物; lit. "The Monster with no Name") was written by Aya Takaba, who worked on the television series. Before the novel was released, it was first published on the "Noitamina Novel" page on Noitamina's official website. The novel was released on February 4, 2013.

A new series of novels focusing on four characters by Ryō Yoshigami began publication in the August issue of Hayakawa Publishing's S-F Magazine on June 25, 2014. After the serialization ended, Hayakawa Bunko JA revised the novels and published them in October 2014. Other stories focused on Choe Gu-sung, Shusei Kagari, Yayoi Kunizuka and Shion Karanomori. Hayakawa Bunko JA also published the Psycho Pass Genesis book in December 2014, which revealed the origins of Sybil and Tonomi Masaoka's involvement.

=== Video games ===
An interactive visual novel titled Chimi Chara Psycho-Pass, which features chibi versions of the series' characters in original stories, was included with Blu-ray Disc volumes of the anime and is playable on any Blu-ray playing device.

In May 2014, it was announced that a video game based on the series, titled Psycho-Pass: Mandatory Happiness, was being developed by 5pb. for the Xbox One with a PlayStation Vita and PlayStation 4 port announced in December 2015. The game features an original story written by Urobuchi, taking place during the time period of the anime's first six episodes and focusing on a new set of protagonists confronting a new enemy on a remote island. NIS America has localized Psycho-Pass: Mandatory Happiness for the PlayStation 4, Vita and an exclusive PC version via Steam. It was released on September 13, 2016, in North America and on September 16, 2016, in Europe. The Xbox One version of the game was not localized.

A virtual reality game will be made in 2020 by Pretia Technologies and organized by Fuji TV's Digital Design department in anticipation of the upcoming film in Q2 2020 called First Inspector. The player controls Kogami and Tsunemori while an original character named Tadashi Kamino will mentor the player.

== Reception ==
=== Popularity ===
Fuji TV producer Akitoshi Mori said Psycho-Pass was the first work under his control. Early screenings of the series at the Noitamina Shop & Café attracted few viewers, which bothered Mori. However, as the series continued, the quantity of viewers increased. By the final episode, over 1,000 people had queued to watch the finale even though the venue could only accommodate seventy people. This made Mori happy because he realized fans were following and supporting the show; but he wanted to see a bigger audience at future screenings. DVDs and Blu-ray discs of the series achieved good sales. In April 2014, the series was nominated for the Seiun Award. In the Newtype anime awards from 2013, it was voted as the fourth best title of the year. Episode 11 of the series was awarded "Best Episode" in the Noitamina 10th anniversary fan vote. Shinya Kogami, Akane Tsunemori and Shogo Makishima also appeared in such polls as winners of their own categories. Anime News Network listed it among the most accessible anime series for people used to American animation and new to Japanese animation. Psycho-Pass was voted as the nineteenth best anime in a 2017 NHK online poll of "Best Anime 100". Crunchyroll included the series among the "Top 100 anime of the decade" list, with writer Kyle Cardine stating that the series "has had a lasting effect as a gripping dystopian sci-fi cop drama among the Urobuchi repertoire." Cold Cobra of Anime UK News picked the series for his list of "best anime of 2010s" and hailed Psycho-Pass as a "sci-fi masterpiece." IGN also listed Psycho-Pass among the best anime of the decade, and wrote that the series is "a psychological thriller with multiple layers of mystery" that "kept us on our toes through the entirety of the first season." In 2020, Anime News Network listed Psycho-Pass as the fourth best Gen Urobuchi anime. Kotaku Australia included the series among "8 Great Anime Series For People Who Don't Like Anime" list.

=== Critical response ===
The first season has garnered critical acclaim. The Daily Star regarded it as one of the most iconic thriller anime due to the handling of society and the two lead characters. Rebecca Silverman from Anime News Network praised the show for its "high level of interest" in depicting its dystopian world. However, she said that its violent scenes were so gruesome they might scare viewers. Kotaku's Richard Eisenbeis called it a "compelling cyberpunk mystery", praising the society depicted and the series of murders orchestrated by Shogo Makishima. However, he criticized the use of advanced technology and compared it with other science fiction films despite saying that it handled the themes better whereas Makishima's immunity to it was left unexplained. DVD Talk gave high praise to Makishima because of his achievements across the story and his personality. Certain episodes have been referred to as "filler" because they are used as a build-up to the climactic ones. Bamboo Dong of Anime News Network gave high praise stating that from episode 12, the series was "a real blast to watch" and that she was glad with the development of the protagonist, Akane Tsunemori. However, she severely criticized the plot twist regarding the Sybil System's true identity calling it "one of the stupidest revelations in the history of anime".

Thomas Zoth from The Fandom Post praised the show's focus on the relationships between the protagonists and the development from these. Tsunemori's growth across the series earned major praise by multiple reviewers. Zoth enjoyed the series' climactic action scenes between Kogami and Makishima, and the scenes portraying the status quo. He said the sixteenth episode is "Urobuchi's masterpiece." Silverman commented on the parallelism between Tsunemori's and Kogami's development, which resulted in an ambiguous ending that should be decided by the viewers. The supporting cast received similar praise by DVD Talk but the reviewer said some were underwhelming and Karanomori is the least-explored character.

During the streaming of the series, Silverman criticized the animation because of the low lighting levels that might make it hard to understand. Hiroko Yamamura from Japanator noted the series' high budget and praised the animation style and the focus on details and technology. She was attracted by its premise and expected the quality to remain consistent across the entire series. Similarly, Jacob Hope Chapman from ANN praised the animation for its high quality. Episode 18, which is known for its flawed animation, was improved for the home media release of the series.

== See also ==
- Anatta
- Fallacy of composition
- Holism
- Holon
- Reductionism
- Id:Invaded, another anime series with a similar premise
