= Toru Kitajima =

Toru Kitajima 北嶋 徹
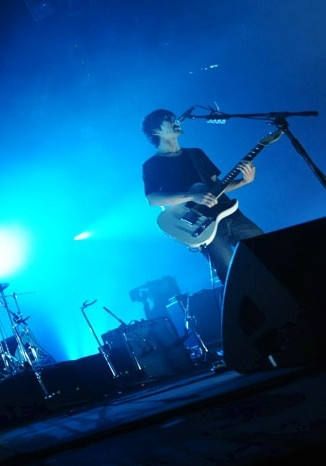
- TK performing live with Ling Tosite Sigure

Background information
- Also known as: TK; TK from Ling Tosite Sigure
- Born: December 23, 1982 (age 43); Machida, Tokyo, Japan
- Genres: Indie rock; post-hardcore; progressive rock; alternative rock; alternative metal
- Occupations: Singer-songwriter; guitarist
- Instruments: Vocals; guitar; piano; bass
- Years active: 2002–present
- Label: Sony Music Associated Records
- Website: https://tkofficial.jp/

Toru Kitajima (Japanese: 北嶋 徹, Hepburn: Kitajima Tōru; born December 23, 1982 in Machida, Tokyo), better known as TK, is a Japanese musician and singer-songwriter. He rose to prominence as lead vocalist, guitarist and songwriter of the rock band Ling Tosite Sigure, which formed in 2002. In 2011, he started to release solo material as TK from Ling Tosite Sigure (TK from 凛として時雨).

== Biography ==
TK started his solo career with a limited DVD titled Film A Moment. Released in 2011, the DVD features a photobook and a movie shot on 8mm film that acts as a music video for the three tracks on the disc.

TK's first album, Flowering, was released on June 27, 2012, and featured alternate versions of "Film A Moment" and "White Silence" (both being originally featured on the DVD release Film A Moment) along with seven new tracks and an additional hidden track titled "Sound_am326." The limited press version featured a live studio session (DVD) of selected tracks from the album directed by P.B. Anderson. Musicians such as BOBO from Miyavi Crew, and Hidekazu Hinata from Nothing's Carved in Stone featured on the album.

Kitajima's second release was prefaced by the single "Unravel", which acted as the opening for the popular anime series Tokyo Ghoul and the mini-album Contrast. "Unravel" had three versions to note, one of them featuring artwork inspired by the series it fronted, the other featuring a DVD titled Killing You Softly (an acoustic live DVD) featuring the track "Jewel of Sin", which would be featured on TK's third album White Noise. And both TK and Ling Tosite Sigure tracks reworked as acoustic pieces. The other version pressed was the standard edition, which featured three tracks, one being featured as the BGM for the Flowering DVD.

The mini-album Contrast was released the same year as "Unravel", being 2014 and featured a live DVD from the 2013 Rock in Japan Festival along with a bonus video filmed in Berlin for the song "Tokio" (limited pressing only). The album also featured a live reworking of the Ling Tosite Sigure song "Illusion is Mine". Both "Unravel" and "Contrast" contained additional B-sides.

Fantastic Magic is TK's second album and features seven new tracks, one featuring vocalist Chara, a reworking of "Dramatic Slow Motion", and the other being "Contrast". The limited pressing contains music videos for songs featured on the album, along with "Haze", released on Flowering.

Secret Sensation was released in early 2016, Kitajima's second mini-album. As before it featured a live track, this one being "White Silence" and a song that would be reworked on White Noise along with respective B-sides as before. The limited press contained two music videos, one for "Secret Sensation" and the other for "Like There is Tomorrow".

TK's second single, "Signal", was featured as an opening for the anime 91 Days. "Signal" had two versions, one being a digipak release with artwork inspired by 91 Days, the other a standard jewel case. Both versions contained a reworked version of "Shandy", a Ling Tosite Sigure track from the album Still a Sigure Virgin?; and the acoustic version of "Unravel".

White Noise, being released in November 2016, featured six new tracks: a reworking of "Like There is Tomorrow", the singles "Signal" and "Secret Sensation", and a proper studio recording of "Jewel of Sin". The limited version featured a live DVD from the Secret Sensation Tour. In 2017, TK started to collaborate with Masayuki Nakano from the former electronic music band Boom Boom Satellites.

On November 21, 2018, TK released a new single, containing the song "Katharsis" and its instrumental and TV edit versions, and a song titled "Memento". "Katharsis" was used as the opening theme for the second season of Tokyo Ghoul:re. Its music video was released on November 20, 2018. On December 10, 2018, it was announced that TK would perform the theme song "P.S. Red I" for the Japanese release of the animated film, Spider-Man: Into the Spider-Verse, which was released in Japan on March 8, 2019.

On April 15, 2020, TK released his fourth studio album, 彩脳. April 14, 2021, he released his third EP by the name of Yesworld.

On August 5, 2021, TK releases his first teaser for "egomaniac feedback" compilation album, with release date of Oct 13th, 2021.

Continuing his solo music project, TK, collaborated with Koshi Inaba of B'z at the start of 2022 to release the single As Long as I Love/Scratch on March 26, 2022.

At the end of 2022, TK would go on to release his hit song First Death with an official music video, do numerous interviews, and release a live of First Death from the Last Death tour filmed on his birthday, December 23.

== Discography ==
=== Studio albums ===
List of studio albums, showing year released, selected details, and chart positions
Title	Details	Peak chart positions	
Title	Details	JPN	JPN Hot
Flowering	Released: June 27, 2012; Label: Sony Music Associated Records; Formats: CD, CD+DVD, digital download, streaming	14	—
Fantastic Magic	Released: August 27, 2014; Label: Sony Music Associated Records; Formats: CD, CD+DVD, digital download, streaming	12	—
White Noise	Released: September 28, 2016; Label: Sony Music Associated Records; Formats: CD, CD+DVD, CD+Blu-ray, digital download, streaming	14	15
Sainou	Released: April 15, 2020; Label: Sony Music Associated Records; Formats: CD, digital download, streaming	8	8
Whose Blue	Released: April 16, 2025; Label: Sony Music Associated Records; Formats: CD, digital download, streaming	16	—
"—" denotes releases that did not chart.

=== Compilation albums ===
List of compilation albums, showing year released, selected details, and chart positions
Title	Details	Peak chart positions	
Title	Details	JPN	JPN Hot
Egomaniac Feedback	Released: October 13, 2021; Label: Sony Music Associated Records; Format: CD, digital download, streaming	19	16
"—" denotes releases that did not chart.

=== Extended plays ===
List of extended plays, showing year released, selected details, and chart positions
Title	Details	Peak chart positions	
Title	Details	JPN	JPN Hot
Contrast	Released: March 5, 2014; Label: Sony Music Associated Records; Formats: CD, CD+DVD, digital download, streaming	10	—
Secret Sensation	Released: March 2, 2016; Label: Sony Music Associated Records; Formats: CD, CD+DVD, digital download, streaming	11	13
Yesworld	Released: April 14, 2021; Label: Sony Music Associated Records; Formats: CD, CD+DVD, digital download, streaming	13	17
"—" denotes releases that did not chart.

=== Singles ===
==== As lead artist ====
List of singles as lead artist, showing year released, selected chart positions, sales, certifications, and album name
Title	Year	Peak chart positions		Sales	Certifications	Album
Title	Year	JPN	JPN Hot	Sales	Certifications	Album
"Unravel"	2014	9	6	JPN: 10,112+ (CD); JPN: 250,000+ (DL)	RIAJ: Platinum (dig.); Platinum (st.)	Fantastic Magic
"Signal"	2016	18	28			White Noise
"Katharsis"	2018	21	33	JPN: 4,539 (CD)		Sainou
"P.S. Red I"	2019	25	90	JPN: 3,235 (CD)		Sainou
"Melt" (with Suis of Yorushika)	2019	—	—			Sainou
"Chou No Tobu Suisou" (蝶の飛ぶ水槽)	2020	33	—	JPN: 2,924 (CD)		Sainou
"Bonnou" (凡脳)	2020	—	—			Sainou
"Copy Light"	2020	—	—			Sainou
"Will-ill"	2021	33	—			Egomaniac Feedback
"As Long as I Love" (with Koshi Inaba)	2022	6	95			Non-album singles
"Scratch" (with Koshi Inaba)	2022	6	—			Non-album singles
"First Death"	2022	24	63			Whose Blue
"KujaKuja no Maamu Aia" (クジャクジャノマアムアイア)	2023	—	—			Whose Blue
"Tagatame" (誰我為)	2024	24	—			Whose Blue
"Un-Apex"	2025	32	—			Whose Blue
"—" denotes releases that did not chart.

==== As featuring artist ====
List of singles as featuring artist, showing year released and album name
Title	Year	Album
"Ender Ember" (with Myth & Roid)	2026	Non-album single

=== Other charted songs ===
List of songs not released as singles, showing year released, selected chart positions, and album name
Title	Year	Peak chart positions	Album
Title	Year	JPN Hot	Album
"Contrast"	2014	48	Contrast and Fantastic Magic

=== Production ===
Title	Role(s)	Album	Album Artist	Year
"Mode Inversion"	Guitarist	Code	Acid Android	2010
"Switch" (TK Remix)	Remixer	Alcove/#1	Acid Android	2011
"Nano" (TK Kaleidoscope Remix)	Remixer, guitarist	Since 2	Spangle call Lilli line	2013
"Tenohira no Sekai" (掌の世界)	Composer, lyricist, producer	Joy!!	SMAP	2013
"Miruiro no Hoshi" (みるいろの星)	Arranger, strings arranger	Panorama	Asaco Nasu	2014
"Dramatic Starlight"	Composer, lyricist, producer	Mr. S	SMAP	2014
"Zephyr" (TK Remix)	Remixer (arranger, guitarist)	Immortalis	Sukekiyo	2015
"Us"	Composer, lyricist, arranger, producer, recording, mixer, programming, guitarist, additional vocals	Daydream	Aimer	2016
"Kowairo" (声色)	Composer, lyricist, arranger, producer, recording, mixer, mastering, guitarist	Daydream	Aimer	2016
"Last Eye"	Composer, producer	Itadakimono	Yuko Ando	2016
"Draw (A) Drow"	Composer, arranger, producer, guitarist	Draw (A) Drow	Seiko Omori	2017
"Stand By You"	Composer, lyricist, arranger, strings arranger, producer, recording engineer, guitarist, additional vocals	Penny Rain	Aimer	2019
"image _____"	Producer	Soushitsu	MEMAI SIREN	2020
"Hikari no Akuma" (光の悪魔)	Lyricist, composer, arranger	Gin no Yuri/Banzai RIZING!!!/Hikari no Akuma	εpsilonΦ	2020
"Red:birthmark"	Composer, lyricist, arranger, producer	RUBY POP	Aina the End	2023
"six feet under"	Composer, lyricist, arranger, producer, guitarist	Jigoku 6	Mori Calliope	2023
"Zez Zez Zez Zettai Seiki" (絶絶絶絶対聖域)	Composer, arranger, producer, guitarist	Non-album single	ano feat. Ikuta Rira	2024
"request"	Composer, lyricist, arranger, producer	request	krage	2024
"Love Sick"	Composer, lyricist, arranger, producer	RUBY POP	Aina the End	2024

== Awards and nominations ==
Year	Award	Category	Nominee/work	Result
2015	Newtype Anime Awards	Best Theme Song	"Unravel" (from anime Tokyo Ghoul)	9th place
