= Okamoto =

- Pronunciation: Okamoto

Origin
- Origin: Japanese
- Meaning: hill base (岡本)
- Region of origin: Japanese

Okamoto (岡本; Japanese pronunciation: [o.ka.mo.to], lit. 'hill base') is the 48th most common Japanese surname. Notable people with the surname include:

- Anri Okamoto (岡本 杏理; born 1994), Japanese fashion model and actress
- Atsushi Okamoto (岡本 篤志; born 1981), professional Nippon Professional Baseball player
- Aya Okamoto (岡本 綾; born 1982), Japanese actress and voice actress
- Ayako Okamoto (岡本 綾子; born 1951), Japanese professional golfer
- Chizuko Okamoto (岡本 千鶴子; born 1951), Japanese woman who was convicted of killing her own daughter
- Fuji Okamoto (岡本 不二; 1905–1984), Japanese boxer
- Hama Okamoto (ハマ・オカモト; born 1991), Japanese musician
- Haruko Okamoto (née Ishida, born 1945), Japanese figure skater
- Hayato Okamoto (disambiguation), multiple people
- Hideo Okamoto (岡本 秀雄; born 1948), Japanese rower
- Hideya Okamoto (岡本 英也; born 1987), Japanese football player
- Hisashi Okamoto (岡本 久; born 1956), Japanese mathematician
- Hitoshi Okamoto (岡本 仁志)), guitarist of the Japanese pop band Garnet Crow
- Okamoto Kanoko (岡本 かの子; 1889–1939), pen-name of a Japanese author, tanka poet, and Buddhism scholar
- Kazuma Okamoto (岡本 和真; born 1996), Japanese professional baseball player
- Keito Okamoto (岡本 圭人; born 1993), Japanese singer and member of the group Hey! Say! JUMP
- Kido Okamoto (岡本 綺堂; 1872–1939), Japanese author
- Kihachi Okamoto (岡本 喜八; 1924–2005), Japanese film director
- Kiichi Okamoto (岡本 帰一; 1888–1930), Japanese painter and illustrator
- Kōzō Okamoto (岡本 公三; 1947–2026), member of the Japanese armed militant group, Japanese Red Army (JRA)
- Kumiko Okamoto (岡本 久美子; born 1965), retired female tennis player from Japan
- Lynn Okamoto (岡本 倫; born 1970), Japanese manga artist
- Mari Okamoto (岡本 茉利; born 1954), Japanese actress and voice actress
- Mariko Okamoto (岡本 眞理子; born 1951), Japanese volleyball player
- Masahiro Okamoto (岡本 昌弘; born 1983), Japanese football player
- Maya Okamoto (岡本 麻弥; born 1967), Japanese actress, voice actress and singer
- Mayo Okamoto (岡本 真夜; born 1974), Japanese singer-songwriter
- Mike Okamoto (born Detroit, United States), American comic book artist and commercial illustrator
- Misugu Okamoto (岡本 碧優; born 2006), Japanese skateboarder
- Mitsunari Okamoto (岡本 三成; born 1965), Japanese politician of Komeito
- Mitsunori Okamoto (岡本 充功; born 1971), Japanese politician of the Democratic Party of Japan
- Natsuki Okamoto (television personality) (岡本 夏生; born 1965), Japanese tarento, race queen and gravure idol
- Natsuki Okamoto (岡本 奈月; born 1989), Japanese fashion model and actress
- Natsumi Okamoto (岡本 夏美; born 1998), Japanese actress and fashion model
- Noboru Okamoto (岡本 登; born 1937), Japanese hammer thrower
- Nobuhiko Okamoto (岡本 信彦; born 1986), Japanese voice actor
- Rai Okamoto (1927–1993), American architect, planner, and author
- Rei Okamoto (岡本 玲; born 1991), Japanese model and actress
- Rina Okamoto (岡本 璃奈; born 1994), Japanese kickboxer
- Shosei Okamoto (岡本 將成; born 2000), Japanese footballer
- Tadashi Okamoto (岡本 正; born 1947), Japanese boxer
- Takeyuki Okamoto (岡本 武行; born 1967), Japanese footballer and manager
- Tao Okamoto (岡本 多緒; born 1985), Japanese model and actress
- Tarō Okamoto (岡本 太郎; 1911–1996), Japanese artist noted for abstract and avant-garde paintings and sculpture
- Tetsuo Okamoto (1932–2007), Brazilian swimmer
- Tomotaka Okamoto (disambiguation), multiple people
- Vincent Okamoto (1943–2020), American Army officer and judge
- Yasuaki Okamoto (岡本 賢明; born 1988), Japanese football player
- Okamoto Yasutaka (岡本 保孝; 1797–1878), Japanese kokugaku scholar
- Yoichi Okamoto (1915–1985), American photographer
- Yoriko Okamoto (岡本 依子; born 1971), first Japanese athlete to become an Olympic taekwondo medalist
- Yoshiki Okamoto (岡本 吉起; born 1961), video game designer credited with producing many of Capcom's popular titles
- Yoshiro Okamoto (岡本 芳郎; born 1943), Japanese politician of the Liberal Democratic Party
- Yuki Okamoto (岡本 勇輝; born 1983), Japanese footballer
- Yukiko Okamoto (disambiguation), multiple people

== See also ==
- 6244 Okamoto, a main-belt asteroid
- Okamoto Station (Hyōgo), railway station of the Hankyu Kobe Line in Higashinada-ku, Kobe
- Okamoto–Uchiyama cryptosystem, discovered in 1998 by T. Okamoto and S. Uchiyama
- Okamoto's, a rock band whose members each adopted stage names with the surname Okamoto
- Taro Okamoto Award, award for Contemporary Art (TARO Award)
