= Noitamina =

Japanese animation programming block

- Network: Fuji TV
- Launched: April 14, 2005; 21 years ago
- Division of: FNS/FNN
- Country of origin: Japan
- Format: Anime
- Running time: Fridays 23:30 – 24:00 JST
- Original language: Japanese
- Official website: Official website

Noitamina (ノイタミナ; stylized noitaminA, "Animation" written backwards) is a Japanese late-night anime programming block produced by Fuji Television, which launched in April 2005, and currently airs on Friday nights from 23:30 to 24:00 JST (effectively Friday nights from 11:30 p.m. to Saturday midnight JST). All anime production under the block are joint-venue by Fuji TV, Dentsu, and usually Sony Music Entertainment Japan (or through its subsidiary Aniplex).

== History ==
The programming block was launched in April 2005 as a half-hour block, with the intention of expanding the target audience beyond the typical young male demographic, and airs every Thursday nights from 24:45 to 25:15 JST (effectively Friday mornings from 12:45 to 1:15 a.m. JST).

The timeslot was expanded from a half-hour to a full hour in 2010, and aired until 25:45 JST (effectively Saturday mornings at 1:45 JST), and temporarily returned to the half-hour timeslot in 2015 due to 5 films produced on the block, which was shown in Japanese theaters in the same year. The only non-anime series featured is the live-action adaptation of Moyasimon: Tales of Agriculture, in 2010.

On April 15, 2010, Fuji TV and Funimation announced an agreement that would allow the latter to simulcast series from the block in North America within an hour of the series' airings, which was then transferred to Aniplex of America after Funimation was acquired by Sony, the owner of Aniplex, in 2017.

On March 17, 2016, Fuji TV signed a deal with Amazon to exclusively stream and simulcast series from the block through their Prime Instant Video service, which premiered with Kabaneri of the Iron Fortress. The deal ceased in 2018, with The Promised Neverland being the first title to no longer be exclusive to Prime Video outside of Japan.

On December 9, 2024, Fuji TV announced that the block would move to an earlier timeslot, which would mark the first time that the block aired on prime time, following a network timeslot rather than a local timeslot. This was adjusted again on March 3, 2025, moving from Thursday nights/Friday mornings to Friday nights at 23:30 JST, after the new timeslot was first used to broadcast Dragon Ball Daima from October 2024 to February 2025.

== Titles ==
No.	Title	Time Slot (Note: All series before the change to the hour-long time-slot started at 0:45. Starting with The House of Five Leaves and The Tatami Galaxy, the former started at 0:45 and the latter thereafter at 1:15. If there is a dash (—) and not a time, the show was part of the half-hour block and started at 0:45.)	Start date	End date	Eps.	Studio	Notes	Ref.
1	Honey and Clover	0:35	April 14, 2005	September 26, 2005	24	J.C.Staff	Based on the manga series by Chica Umino.	
2	Paradise Kiss	0:35	October 13, 2005	December 29, 2005	12	Madhouse	Based on the manga series by Ai Yazawa.	
3	Ayakashi: Samurai Horror Tales	0:35	January 13, 2006	March 24, 2006	11	Toei Animation	Original work based on Japanese classic tales.	
4	Jyu-Oh-Sei	0:45	April 13, 2006	June 22, 2006	11	Bones	Based on the manga series by Natsumi Itsuki.	
5	Honey and Clover II	0:45	June 29, 2006	September 14, 2006	12	J.C.Staff	Sequel to Honey and Clover.	
6	Hataraki Man	0:45	October 12, 2006	December 21, 2006	11	Gallop	Based on the manga series by Moyoco Anno.	
7	Nodame Cantabile	0:45	January 11, 2007	June 28, 2007	23	J.C.Staff	Based on the manga series by Tomoko Ninomiya.	
8	Mononoke	0:45	July 12, 2007	September 27, 2007	12	Toei Animation	Spin-off to Ayakashi.	
9	Moyasimon: Tales of Agriculture	0:45	October 12, 2007	December 21, 2007	11	Shirogumi; Telecom Animation Film	Based on the manga series by Masayuki Ishikawa.	
10	Hakaba Kitarō	0:45	January 10, 2008	March 20, 2008	11	Toei Animation	Based on the manga series by Shigeru Mizuki.	
11	Library War	0:45	April 10, 2008	June 26, 2008	12	Production I.G	Based on the light novel series by Hiro Arikawa.	
12	Antique Bakery	0:45	July 3, 2008	September 18, 2008	12	Nippon Animation; Shirogumi	Based on the manga series by Fumi Yoshinaga.	
13	Nodame Cantabile: Paris Chapter	0:45	October 9, 2008	December 18, 2008	11	J.C.Staff	Sequel to Nodame Cantabile.	
14	Genji Monogatari Sennenki	0:45	January 15, 2009	March 26, 2009	11	TMS Entertainment; Tezuka Productions	Based on The Tale of Genji.	
15	Eden of the East	0:45	April 9, 2009	June 18, 2009	11	Production I.G	Original work.	
16	Tokyo Magnitude 8.0	0:45	July 9, 2009	September 17, 2009	11	Bones; Kinema Citrus	Original work.	
17	Kūchū Buranko	0:45	October 15, 2009	December 24, 2009	11	Toei Animation	Based on the series of short stories by Hideo Okuda.	
18	Nodame Cantabile: Finale	0:45	January 14, 2010	March 25, 2010	11	J.C.Staff	Sequel to Nodame Cantabile: Paris Chapter.	
19	House of Five Leaves	0:45	April 15, 2010	July 1, 2010	12	Manglobe	Based on the manga series by Natsume Ono.	
20	The Tatami Galaxy	1:15; 0:55 (Rerun)	April 22, 2010; April 8, 2022 (Rerun)	July 1, 2010; June 24, 2022 (Rerun)	11; 12 (Rerun)	Madhouse	Based on the novel series by Tomihiko Morimi.	
21	Moyashimon (live-action)	0:45	July 8, 2010	September 16, 2010	11	Shirogumi	Live-action adaptation of Moyashimon.	
22	Shiki	1:15	July 8, 2010	December 30, 2010	22	Daume	Based on the novel series by Fuyumi Ono.	
23	Princess Jellyfish	0:45	October 14, 2010	December 30, 2010	11	Brain's Base	Based on the manga series by Akiko Higashimura.	
24	Fractale	0:45	January 13, 2011	March 31, 2011	11	A-1 Pictures; Ordet	Original work.	
25	Wandering Son	1:15	January 13, 2011	March 31, 2011	11	AIC	Based on the manga series by Takako Shimura.	
26	[C]	0:45	April 14, 2011	June 23, 2011	11	Tatsunoko Production	Original work.	
27	Anohana: The Flower We Saw That Day	1:15 (Note: Rebroadcast under the same timeslot.)	April 14, 2011; July 11, 2013 (Rerun)	June 23, 2011; September 19, 2013 (Rerun)	11	A-1 Pictures	Original work.	
28	Bunny Drop	0:45	July 7, 2011	September 15, 2011	11	Production I.G	Based on the manga series by Yumi Unita.	
29	No. 6	1:15	July 7, 2011	September 15, 2011	11	Bones	Based on the novel series by Atsuko Asano	
30	Un-Go	0:45	October 13, 2011	December 22, 2011	11	Bones	Based loosely on the works of Ango Sakaguchi.	
31	Guilty Crown	1:15	October 13, 2011	March 22, 2012	22	Production I.G	Original work.	
32	Thermae Romae	0:45	January 12, 2012	January 26, 2012	3	DLE	Based on the manga series by Mari Yamazaki.	
33	Black Rock Shooter	0:45	February 2, 2012	March 22, 2012	8	Ordet; Sanzigen	Related to the OVA Black Rock Shooter.	
34	Kids on the Slope	0:45	April 12, 2012	June 28, 2012	12	MAPPA; Tezuka Productions	Based on the manga series by Yuki Kodama.	
35	Tsuritama	1:15; 0:55 (Note: Due to the COVID-19 pandemic, broadcast for The Millionaire Detective Balance: Unlimited was suspended after two episodes, and subsequently replaced with the rebroadcast of Tsuritama.)(Rerun)	April 12, 2012; April 24, 2020 (Rerun)	June 28, 2012; July 3, 2020 (Rerun)	12	A-1 Pictures	Original work.	
36	Moyashimon Returns	0:45	July 5, 2012	September 13, 2012	11	Shirogumi; Telecom Animation Film	Sequel to Moyashimon.	
37	Natsuyuki Rendezvous	1:15	July 5, 2012	September 13, 2012	11	Doga Kobo	Based on the manga series by Haruka Kawachi.	
38	Psycho-Pass	0:45; 1:20 (Note: Rebroadcast and aired as re-edits of 11 hour-long episodes.) (Rerun)	October 11, 2012; July 10, 2014 (Rerun)	March 21, 2013; September 25, 2014 (Rerun)	22; 11 (Rerun)	Production I.G	Original work.	
39	Robotics;Notes	1:15	October 11, 2012	March 21, 2013	22	Production I.G	Based on the visual novel by 5pb.	
40	Katanagatari	0:45 (Note: Aired in both 0:45 and 1:15 timeslots; originally aired on Fuji TV from January to December 2010.)	April 11, 2013	June 27, 2013	12	White Fox	Based on the light novel series by Nisio Isin. First rerun of the block.	
41	Silver Spoon (Season 1)	0:45	July 11, 2013	September 19, 2013	11	A-1 Pictures	Based on the manga series by Hiromu Arakawa.	
42	Galilei Donna	0:50	October 10, 2013	December 19, 2013	11	A-1 Pictures	Original work.	
43	Samurai Flamenco	1:20	October 10, 2013	March 27, 2014	22	Manglobe	Original work.	
44	Silver Spoon (Season 2)	0:50	January 9, 2014	March 27, 2014	11	A-1 Pictures	Sequel to Silver Spoon.	
45	Ping Pong	0:50	April 10, 2014	June 19, 2014	11	Tatsunoko Production	Based on the manga series by Taiyō Matsumoto.	
46	Nanana's Buried Treasure	1:20	April 10, 2014	June 19, 2014	11	A-1 Pictures	Based on the light novel series by Kazuma Ōtorino.	
47	Terror in Resonance	0:50	July 10, 2014	September 25, 2014	11	MAPPA	Original work.	
48	Psycho-Pass 2	0:50	October 9, 2014	December 18, 2014	11	Tatsunoko Production	Sequel to Psycho-Pass.	
49	Your Lie in April	1:15	October 9, 2014	March 19, 2015	22	A-1 Pictures	Based on the manga series by Naoshi Arakawa.	
50	Saekano: How to Raise a Boring Girlfriend	0:50	January 8, 2015	March 26, 2015	13 (Note: The last two episodes aired back-to-back, bringing the total episode count to 13 (including Episode 0 that aired on its premiere date).)	A-1 Pictures	Based on the light novel series by Fumiaki Maruto.	
51	Punch Line	0:55 (Note: Starting April 2015, noitaminA's timeslot was reduced to half-hour slots, due to the programming block's production of six anime films that were planned to be shown on the block in the same year (only five were shown, while the sixth film was released in 2017).)	April 9, 2015	June 25, 2015	12	MAPPA	Original work.	
52	Rampo Kitan: Game of Laplace	0:55	July 2, 2015	September 17, 2015	11	Lerche	Based on the works of Edogawa Ranpo.	
53	The Perfect Insider	0:55	October 8, 2015	December 17, 2015	11	A-1 Pictures	Based on the novel series by Hiroshi Mori.	
54	Erased	0:55	January 7, 2016	March 24, 2016	12	A-1 Pictures	Based on the manga series by Kei Sanbe.	
55	Kabaneri of the Iron Fortress	0:55	April 7, 2016	June 30, 2016	12	Wit Studio	Original work.	
56	Battery	0:55	July 14, 2016	September 22, 2016	11	Zero-G	Based on the novel series by Atsuko Asano.	
57	The Great Passage	0:55	October 13, 2016	December 23, 2016	11	Zexcs	Based on the novel series by Shion Miura	
58	Scum's Wish	0:55	January 12, 2017	March 30, 2017	12	Lerche	Based on the manga series by Mengo Yokoyari.	
59	Saekano: How to Raise a Boring Girlfriend ♭	0:55	April 13, 2017	June 23, 2017	12	A-1 Pictures	Sequel to Saekano: How to Raise a Boring Girlfriend	
60	Dive!!	0:55	July 6, 2017	September 21, 2017	12	Zero-G	Based on the novel series by Eto Mori.	
61	Inuyashiki	0:55	October 12, 2017	December 22, 2017	11	MAPPA	Based on the manga series by Hiroya Oku.	
62	After the Rain	0:55	January 12, 2018	March 29, 2018	12	Wit Studio	Based on the manga series by Jun Mayuzuki.	
63	Wotakoi: Love Is Hard for Otaku	0:55	April 12, 2018	June 22, 2018	11	A-1 Pictures	Based on the manga series by Fujita.	
64	Banana Fish	0:55	July 5, 2018	December 20, 2018	24	MAPPA	Based on the manga series by Akimi Yoshida.	
65	The Promised Neverland (Season 1)	0:55	January 11, 2019; October 9, 2020 (Rerun)	March 29, 2019; December 25, 2020 (Rerun)	12	CloverWorks	Based on the manga series by Kaiu Shirai and Posuka Demizu	
66	Sarazanmai	0:55	April 12, 2019	June 21, 2019	11	MAPPA; Lapin Track	Original work	
67	Given	0:55	July 12, 2019	September 20, 2019	11	Lerche	Based on the manga series by Natsuki Kizu.	
68	Psycho-Pass 3	0:55	October 25, 2019	December 13, 2019	8	Production I.G	Sequel to Psycho-Pass 2.	
69	Uchitama?! Have you seen my Tama?	0:55	January 10, 2020	March 20, 2020	11	MAPPA; Lapin Track	Based on the franchise by Sony Creative Products Inc.	
70	The Millionaire Detective Balance: Unlimited (Note: Due to the COVID-19 pandemic, broadcast was suspended after two episodes, and subsequently aired its remaining episodes after the rebroadcast of Tsuritama.)	0:55	April 10, 2020	September 25, 2020	11	CloverWorks	Based on the novel series by Yasutaka Tsutsui.	
71	2.43: Seiin High School Boys Volleyball Team	0:55	January 8, 2021	March 26, 2021	12	David Production	Based on the light novel series by Yukako Kabei.	
72	The Promised Neverland (Season 2)	1:25	January 8, 2021	March 26, 2021	11	CloverWorks	Sequel to The Promised Neverland.	
73	Backflip!!	0:55	April 9, 2021	June 25, 2021	12	Zexcs	Original work.	
74	The Idaten Deities Know Only Peace	0:55	July 23, 2021	October 1, 2021	11	MAPPA	Based on the manga series by Coolkyousinnjya and Amahara.	
75	Ranking of Kings	0:55	October 15, 2021	March 25, 2022	23	Wit Studio	Based on the manga series by Sōsuke Tōka.	
76	Call of the Night (Season 1)	0:55	July 8, 2022	September 30, 2022	13	Liden Films	Based on the manga series by Kotoyama.	
77	Urusei Yatsura (Season 1)	0:55	October 14, 2022	March 24, 2023	23	David Production	Re-adaptation of the manga series by Rumiko Takahashi.	
78	Ranking of Kings: The Treasure Chest of Courage	0:55	April 14, 2023	June 16, 2023	10	Wit Studio	Side story to Ranking of Kings.	
79	Rurouni Kenshin	0:55	July 7, 2023	December 15, 2023	24	Liden Films	Re-adaptation of the manga series by Nobuhiro Watsuki.	
80	Urusei Yatsura (Season 2)	0:55	January 12, 2024	June 21, 2024	23	David Production	Sequel to the re-adaptation of Urusei Yatsura.	
81	Senpai Is an Otokonoko	0:55	July 5, 2024	September 27, 2024	12	Project No.9	Based on the manga series by Pom.	
82	Rurouni Kenshin: Kyoto Disturbance (Season 2)	0:55	October 4, 2024	March 21, 2025	23	Liden Films	Sequel to the re-adaptation of Rurouni Kenshin.	
83	The Dinner Table Detective	23:30 (Note: Starting April 2025, noitaminA was moved to a prime time network timeslot, rather than a local timeslot.)	April 4, 2025	June 20, 2025	12	Madhouse	Based on the novel series by Tokuya Higashigawa. First series airing nationwide on FNS.	
84	Call of the Night (Season 2)	23:30	July 4, 2025	September 19, 2025	12	Liden Films	Sequel to Call of the Night.	
85	Shabake	23:30	October 3, 2025	December 26, 2025	13	BN Pictures	Based on the novel series by Megumi Hatakenaka.	
86	High School! Kimengumi	23:30	January 9, 2026	March 27, 2026	12	Seven	Re-adaptation of the manga series by Motoei Shinzawa.	
87	The Elusive Samurai (Season 1) (Note: Season 1 aired on Tokyo MX and other networks from July to September 2024.)	23:30	April 17, 2026	July 3, 2026	12	CloverWorks	Based on the manga series by Yusei Matsui. Rebroadcast of the first season.	
88	The Elusive Samurai (Season 2)	23:30	July 17, 2026	October 2, 2026	12	CloverWorks	Sequel to The Elusive Samurai.	
89	Firefly Wedding	23:30	October 9, 2026	December 2026	TBA	David Production	Based on the manga series by Oreco Tachibana.	
90	Bless	23:30	January 8, 2027	TBA	TBA	A-1 Pictures	Based on the manga series by Yukino Sonoyama.	

== Films ==
#	Title	Release date	Studio	Notes	Ref.
1	Eden of the East Compilation: Air Communication	September 26, 2009	Production I.G	Re-editing of Eden of the East.	
2	Eden of the East: The King of Eden	November 28, 2009	Production I.G	Sequel to Eden of the East.	
3	Eden of the East: Paradise Lost	March 13, 2010	Production I.G	Sequel to Eden of the East: The King of Eden.	
4	Un-Go episode:0 Inga chapter	November 19, 2011	Bones	Prequel to Un-Go.	
5	Library War: The Wings of Revolution	June 16, 2012	Production I.G	Related to Library War.	
6	Anohana the Movie: The Flower We Saw That Day	August 31, 2013	A-1 Pictures	Compilation of Anohana: The Flower We Saw That Day with new epilogue.	
7	Psycho-Pass: The Movie	January 9, 2015	Production I.G	Sequel to Psycho-Pass 2.	
8	Typhoon Noruda	June 5, 2015	Studio Colorido	Original work.	
9	The Anthem of the Heart	September 19, 2015	A-1 Pictures	Original work.	
10	The Empire of Corpses	October 2, 2015	Wit Studio	Based on the novel series by Project Itoh.	
11	Harmony	November 13, 2015	Studio 4°C	Based on the novel series by Project Itoh.	
12	Kabaneri of the Iron Fortress: Gathering Light	December 31, 2016	Wit Studio	First part of the compilation of Kabaneri of the Iron Fortress.	
13	Kabaneri of the Iron Fortress: Burning Life	January 7, 2017	Wit Studio	Second part of the compilation of Kabaneri of the Iron Fortress.	
14	Genocidal Organ	February 3, 2017	Manglobe and Geno Studio	Based on the novel series by Project Itoh.	
15	The Night Is Short, Walk On Girl	April 7, 2017	Science Saru	Based on the novel series by Tomihiko Morimi.	
16	Lu over the Wall	May 19, 2017	Science Saru	Original work.	
17	Penguin Highway	August 17, 2018	Studio Colorido	Based on the novel series by Tomihiko Morimi.	
18	Psycho-Pass: Sinners of the System – Case 1: Crime and Punishment	January 25, 2019	Production I.G	First movie of Psycho-Pass: Sinners of the System trilogy and sequel to Psycho-Pass: The Movie.	
19	Psycho-Pass: Sinners of the System – Case 2: First Guardian	February 15, 2019	Production I.G	Second movie of Psycho-Pass: Sinners of the System trilogy and prequel to Psycho-Pass.	
20	Psycho-Pass: Sinners of the System – Case 3: On the Other Side of Love and Hate	March 8, 2019	Production I.G	Third and final movie of Psycho-Pass: Sinners of the System trilogy and sequel to Psycho-Pass: The Movie.	
21	The Wonderland	April 26, 2019	Signal.MD	Based on the novel series by Sachiko Kashiwaba.	
22	Kabaneri of the Iron Fortress: Unato Decisive Battle	May 10, 2019	Wit Studio	Sequel to Kabaneri of the Iron Fortress.	
23	Ride Your Wave	June 21, 2019	Science Saru	Original work.	
24	Her Blue Sky	October 11, 2019	CloverWorks	Original work.	
25	Saekano the Movie: Finale	October 26, 2019	CloverWorks	Sequel to Saekano: How to Raise a Boring Girlfriend ♭.	
26	Psycho-Pass 3: First Inspector	March 27, 2020	Production I.G	Sequel to Psycho-Pass 3.	
27	Given	August 22, 2020	Lerche	Sequel to Given.	
28	Backflip!!	July 2, 2022	Zexcs	Sequel to Backflip!!.	
29	Senpai wa Otokonoko: Clear After the Rain	February 14, 2025	Project No.9	Sequel to Senpai Is an Otokonoko.	

== See also ==
- Late-night anime programming blocks in Japan
- Other anime programming blocks by FNS
  - Blue Lynx, Fuji TV's yaoi (boys' love) anime label
  - +Ultra, airing on Wednesday nights/Thursday mornings
