= The Manzai Comics =

Japanese manga series

- English edition of the first volume of The Manzai Comics as published by Aurora Publishing
- Genre: Comedy
- Manga
- Written by: Atsuko Asano
- Illustrated by: Hizuru Imai
- Published by: Jive
- English publisher: NA: Aurora Publishing
- Magazine: Comic Rush
- Original run: December 1, 2005 – March 10, 2009
- Volumes: 5

The Manzai Comics (also known as The Comedy Team) is a manga series written by Atsuko Asano and illustrated by Hizuru Imai. In Japan it is published by Jive. In the United States it is published by Aurora Publishing.

Takashi Akimoto (秋本 貴史, Akimoto Takashi), a confident and forceful student, cajoles Ayumu Seta (瀬田 歩, Seta Ayumu), a misfit, into forming a manzai comedy duo together. Other characters include Meguna, Takashi's childhood friend and "fated partner", Kotomi, a yaoi fan who ships Takashi and Ayumu, Yuichi, a "class officer", and Nobuhiko, Takashi's soccer teammate who mediates between Takashi and Ayumu.

== Volumes ==
Jive prints The Manzai Comics under its Pureful imprint in an A6 size and under its Colorful Bunko imprint in a B6 size.

No.	Original release date	Original ISBN	English release date	English ISBN
1	December 1, 2005	978-4-86176-253-6	January 2009	978-1934496503
2	March 1, 2006	978-4-86176-281-9	-	—
3	September 11, 2006	978-4-86176-335-9	-	—
4	November 10, 2007	978-4-86176-455-4	-	—
5	March 10, 2009	978-4-86176-645-9	-	—

== Reception ==
Danica Davidson finds Ayumi to be a very sympathetic character, as she regards his "insecurity" and drive to be "normal" as being "understandable to readers his age or anyone who's ever been his age". Davidson felt that the serious treatment of Ayumu's family tragedy was incongruous with the broader comedy themes of the manga, and wondered in what tone the manga would continue. Ed Chavez feels that the theme of the manga is "learning about relationships" and feelings, and notes that they've "gone through a lot", particularly Ayumu, who is starting at a new school after a family tragedy. Ayumu feels responsible for the incident, and is making an effort "not to stand out" and to "just be a normal kid".Chavez feels that Takashi sees Ayumu's true personality under his "normal kid" facade, and decides that Ayumu is the perfect teammate for Takashi's dream of being part of the funniest comedy duo in Japan. Chavez did not find the main duo engaging enough to wish to continue reading the series, although he enjoyed the interactions of the whole cast. He feels the theme of The Manzai Comics is learning to grow up and have fun along the way and learning to hold on to your ambitions, classifying The Manzai Comics as seinen, but feels the manga would be more suitable for younger readers despite some swearing.

Chavez places the theme of the manga within the context of a manzai boom of the 1980s, and a subsequent general increase of manzai on television and anime. He felt that the comedic twist on the staging of Romeo and Juliet was refreshing. Brigid Alverson was disappointed that there were no translator's notes explaining manzai. Chavez feels that later, the more complicated manzai humour is lost in translation, and that it is a difficult topic for a manga. Alverson did not find the comedy particularly funny, but felt the secondary characters were well-developed, especially enjoying the lampooning of "super-cute shoujo girl" characters via Meg. Chavez also remarked on the character designs of the females, describing them as "moe", noting the illustrator's previous work for Gainax. Katherine Dacey felt that the manga "covered familiar ground, but yielded some funny moments nevertheless", feeling that the more "melodramatic" moments were not well-integrated with the rest of the manga, but that they added an extra dimension to the characters' friendship. Connie C. for PopCultureShock felt that the blending of genres was done well, and although she found the plot and characters "unremarkable", she felt that the manga was well-executed.
