= Battery (novel series) =

Novel by Atsuko Asano

- Cover of the first volume of the novel series

バッテリー (Batterī)
- Genre: Sports
- Novel
- Written by: Atsuko Asano
- Illustrated by: Makiko Satō
- Published by: Kyōikugageki; Kadokawa Bunko
- Imprint: Kyōikugageki no Sōsaku Bungaku; Kadokawa Shoten; Kadokawa Tsubasa Shoten
- Audio drama
- Station: NHK FM
- Original run: April 17, 2000 – April 28, 2000
- Episodes: 10
- Manga
- Written by: Atsuko Asano
- Illustrated by: Chikage Yuniwa
- Published by: Kadokawa Shoten
- Magazine: Monthly Asuka
- Original run: 2005 – September 24, 2021
- Volumes: 8
- Live-action film

The Battery
- Directed by: Yōjirō Takita
- Written by: Tadashi Morishita
- Music by: Ryō Yoshimata
- Studio: Toho
- Released: March 10, 2007
- Runtime: 119 minutes
- Television drama
- Written by: Atsuko Sagara
- Original network: NHK General TV
- Original run: April 3, 2008 – June 12, 2008
- Episodes: 10
- Anime television series
- Directed by: Tomomi Mochizuki
- Written by: Tomomi Mochizuki
- Music by: Akira Senju
- Studio: Zero-G
- Licensed by: NA: RetroCrush (Note: Formerly Amazon Prime Video); NA: Discotek Media (home video)
- Original network: Fuji TV, Kansai TV (Noitamina)
- Original run: July 14, 2016 – September 22, 2016
- Episodes: 11

Battery (Japanese: バッテリー, Hepburn: Batterī) is a Japanese novel series by Atsuko Asano that was published by Kadokawa Shoten. The series is about Harada Takumi and Gō Nagakura, two boys who start a baseball team. For the work the author received the Noma Prize for Juvenile Literature in 1997 and the Shogakukan Children's Publication Culture Award in 2005. It has sold over 10 million copies in Japan, and has been adapted into a film in 2007 and an anime television series in 2016.

== Plot ==
This story is about a young baseball pitcher named Takumi Harada who just recently moved in with his grandfather, a former coach at Nitta High School. Later on, Harada meets a catcher named Gō Nakagura. They start playing ball together, and Harada realizes that Gō can keep up with his pitches. Harada gets motivated and joins the baseball team at Nitta High. The two boys later begin their journey with a baseball team.

== Characters ==
=== Main characters ===
Takumi Harada (原田 巧, Harada Takumi)
Voiced by: Koki Uchiyama (anime), Mamoru Miyano (radio drama)
Portrayed by: Kento Hayashi (movie), Yuma Nakayama (TV drama)
Gō Nagakura (永倉 豪, Nagakura Gō)
Voiced by: Tasuku Hatanaka (anime)
Portrayed by: Kenta Yamada (movie), Shō Takada (live-action series)

=== Other characters ===
Seiha Harada (原田 青波, Harada Seiha)
Voiced by: Yūi Fujimaki (anime), Hayato Taya (radio drama)
Portrayed by: Akihiro Yarita (movie), Shintarō Morimoto (TV drama)
Shūgo Kadowaki (門脇 秀吾, Kadowaki Shūgo)
Voiced by: Yūki Ono (anime)
Portrayed by: Dai Watanabe (movie), Ryūta Nakamura (TV drama)
Shunji Mizugaki (瑞垣 俊二, Mizugaki Shunji)
Voiced by: Ryōhei Kimura (anime)
Portrayed by: Yasuaki Seki (movie), Kazuma Kawahara (TV drama)
Kazuki Kaionji (海音寺 一希, Kaionji Kazuki)
Voiced by: Yūichirō Umehara (anime)
Portrayed by: Hiroshi Yazaki (movie), Ryōsuke Kawamura (TV drama)
Keita Higashidani (東谷啓太, Higashidani Keita)
Voiced by: Kaito Ishikawa (anime)
Fumito Sawaguchi (沢口文人, Sawaguchi Fumito)
Voiced by: Ayumu Murase (anime)

== Media ==
=== Anime ===
An anime television series adaptation aired on July 14, 2016, on the Noitamina block of Fuji TV and concluded on September 22, 2016. The series was directed and written by Tomomi Mochizuki, with animation by the studio Zero-G. Hideoki Kusama served as character designer and chief animation director, and Akira Senju was in charge of the music.
