= Call of the Night =

Japanese manga series

- First tankōbon volume cover, featuring Nazuna Nanakusa (top) and Ko Yamori (bottom)

よふかしのうた (Yofukashi no Uta)
- Genre: Romantic comedy; Supernatural
- Manga
- Written by: Kotoyama
- Published by: Shogakukan
- English publisher: NA: Viz Media
- Imprint: Shōnen Sunday Comics
- Magazine: Weekly Shōnen Sunday
- Original run: August 28, 2019 – January 24, 2024
- Volumes: 20
- Anime television series
- Directed by: Tomoyuki Itamura; Tetsuya Miyanishi (S1) (Note: Credited as Chief Director (チーフディレクター))
- Produced by: Hana Sugawara; Shigetoshi Sato (S1); Kazuki Adachi (S2)
- Written by: Michiko Yokote
- Music by: Yoshiaki Dewa
- Studio: Liden Films
- Licensed by: NA: Sentai Filmworks
- Original network: Fuji TV (Noitamina)
- Original run: July 8, 2022 – September 19, 2025
- Episodes: 25
- Manga

Call of the Night: Paradise Arc
- Written by: Kotoyama
- Published by: Shogakukan
- English publisher: NA: Viz Media
- Imprint: Shōnen Sunday Comics
- Magazine: Weekly Shōnen Sunday
- Original run: July 2, 2025 – August 27, 2025
- Volumes: 1
- icon

Call of the Night (Japanese: よふかしのうた, Hepburn: Yofukashi no Uta) is a Japanese manga series written and illustrated by Kotoyama. It was serialized in Shogakukan's shōnen manga magazine Weekly Shōnen Sunday from August 2019 to January 2024, with its chapters collected in 20 tankōbon volumes. In North America, the manga is licensed for an English release by Viz Media.

A 13-episode anime television series adaptation produced by Liden Films aired from July to September 2022 on Fuji TV's Noitamina programming block. A second 12-episode season aired on the same programming block from July to September 2025.

In 2023, the manga won the 68th Shogakukan Manga Award for the shōnen category.

== Plot ==
Unable to sleep or find genuine satisfaction in his daily life, Ko Yamori withdraws from school and begins wandering the streets at night. During one of his nocturnal outings, he encounters Nazuna Nanakusa, a vampire who introduces him to the appeal of life after dark. Ko becomes interested in becoming a vampire himself; however, to do so, he must first fall in love with her, as required by the transformation rules.

== Characters ==
=== Main ===
Ko Yamori (夜守 コウ, Yamori Kō)
Voiced by: Gen Satō, Sayaka Senbongi^{Ep. 2 credits} (young) (Japanese); Gabriel Regojo, Katelyn Barr (young) (English)
Ko is a 14-year-old junior high student whose growing dissatisfaction with life drives him to wander the streets at night. He hopes to escape his humanity by becoming a vampire through loving Nazuna. Gradually, he gains the ability to enter a half-vampire state, first triggered by emotional turmoil or physical blood loss, including minor wounds. Anko supplies him with an ear-piercing kit to control these transformations, theorizing that frequent use or stronger romantic attachment could complete his transition into a full vampire.
Nazuna Nanakusa (七草 ナズナ, Nanakusa Nazuna)
Voiced by: Sora Amamiya (Japanese); Natalie Rial (English)
Nazuna is a unique born vampire, the hybrid offspring of a vampire mother and a human father, who meets Ko during his nightly walks. She appears as a young girl but is estimated to be 30 to 40 years old. Her unusual heritage causes her to mature rapidly while retaining childlike traits, making her an outcast among other vampires. A playful but socially awkward figure, she often teases Ko and enjoys crude humor and beer. Having learned about the world primarily from television, games, and manga, her behavior often subverts traditional vampire stereotypes. Her sole weakness is her own preserved umbilical cord.

=== Humans ===
Akira Asai (朝井 アキラ, Asai Akira)
Voiced by: Yumiri Hanamori (Japanese); Jade Kelly, Juliet Simmons (young) (English)
Ko's childhood friend, who lives in the same apartment complex as him. She attempts to try and convince him to return to school, but also, reluctantly, is supportive of his dream of becoming a vampire. She treasures her relationship with Ko and Mahiru.
Kiyosumi Shirakawa (白河 清澄, Shirakawa Kiyosumi)
Voiced by: Yoko Hikasa (Japanese); Kelly Greenshield (English)
An office worker who is one of Nazuna's clients from her massage gig. After hearing about her struggles in life due to her heavy work schedule, Ko vows to help her, as he feels they share the same plight, and will offer to turn her into a vampire when he becomes one himself.
Mahiru Seki (夕 真昼, Seki Mahiru)
Voiced by: Kensho Ono, Sara Matsumoto^{Ep. 8 credits} (young) (Japanese); Daman Mills (English)
A popular boy at school, and one of Ko and Akira's old friends, who also starts to hang out at night. He is initially apprehensive of Ko's dream of becoming a vampire after they are attacked by one, but after learning the woman he fell in love with, Kiku Hoshimi, is also one, he decides to let himself be turned too.
Akihito Akiyama (秋山 昭人, Akiyama Akihito)
Voiced by: Hiroyuki Yoshino (Japanese); James Marler (English)
Seri's vampire underling. He befriended Seri, and after a situation where he was saved by Ko who helped the two of them understand their feelings, he asked her to turn him into a vampire. He is often referred to as "Draggo", "Menhera-san'", or "Mr. Mental" by Ko.
Anko Uguisu (鶯 餡子, Uguisu Anko)
Voiced by: Miyuki Sawashiro (Japanese); Jessica Calvello (English)
A chain-smoking vampire hunter who initially opposes Ko and the vampires, specializing in killing them by exploiting their personal mementos. She is later revealed to be Nazuna's first friend and attempted familiar. Her hatred stems from her vampire father murdering her mother, an act for which she subsequently destroyed him using his weakness. After a suicide attempt meant to expose vampirism, she reconciles with Nazuna. With Ko's help, she confronts Kiku Hoshimi, the vampire who turned her father, and finds resolution. Although initially incapable of love due to severe mental trauma, she eventually recovers and displays attraction to both men and women.
Sakura Asakura (浅倉 さくら, Asakura Sakura)
Sakura is a student who goes to the same school as Ko and confessed to him. Ko rejected her and stopped going to school after getting harassed by her friends.
Lira Echigo (越後 リラ, Echigo Rira)
Lira is a student at the night school Niko Hirata teaches at, who falls in love at first sight with Ko. Her character was cut from the anime, only showing up in the background.
Kei Yamori (夜守 ケイ, Yamori Kei)
Kei is Ko's mother. She gave birth and got married at the age of twenty and got a divorce when her husband cheated on her. From that point on, she has been raising Ko as a single mother and works in the night entertainment industry.

=== Vampires ===
Seri Kikyo (桔梗 セリ, Kikyō Seri)
Voiced by: Haruka Tomatsu (Japanese); Christina Kelly (English)
A flirtatious vampire who resembles a gyaru. She approaches Ko when she hears that Nazuna is spending the night with a human where she attempts to suck his blood, until she is stopped by Nazuna. The two do not get along well, as she questions why Nazuna is spending so much time with Ko while not having turned him yet.
Niko Hirata (平田 ニコ, Hirata Niko)
Voiced by: Eri Kitamura (Japanese); Monica Rial (English)
A vampire who doubles as a teacher who teaches night classes. She is not as accepting of Ko in her first encounter with him, but becomes willing to let him stay with Nazuna so long as he fulfills his intentions on becoming a vampire and Nazuna continues to suck his blood.
Kabura Honda (本田 カブラ, Honda Kabura)
Voiced by: Shizuka Itō (Japanese); Patricia Duran (English)
A vampire who wears elegant dresses, she works as a nurse and is Nazuna's adoptive mother. Hopelessly in love with Nazuna's mother, Haru Nanakusa, the woman who turned her, she projects these feelings onto Nazuna due to their similar appearance. This results in her acting as an overbearing and doting parental figure. Although becoming a vampire allowed her to feel attraction to men, she still prefers women, holding onto the memory of her first love for Haru.
Midori Kohakobe (小繁縷 ミドリ, Kohakobe Midori)
Voiced by: Naomi Ōzora (Japanese); Emily Neves (English)
A long-sleeved shirt-wearing vampire works in a maid cafe and is highly aware of her own good looks, which can make her seem self-absorbed. By her own admission, she is attracted to shy virgins. To find a suitable partner among that demographic, she actively takes up various geeky hobbies and activities.
Hatsuka Suzushiro (蘿蔔 ハツカ, Suzushiro Hatsuka)
Voiced by: Azumi Waki (Japanese); Annie Wild (English)
A male vampire possesses a notably feminine appearance due to his slender body, shoulder-length hair, cute face, and choice of clothing. His group of familiars includes both men and women, though his own personal identity remains unknown.
Kiku Hoshimi (星見 キク, Hoshimi Kiku)
Voiced by: Rina Satō (Japanese); Nickolette Kong (English)
Kiku is an enigmatic, sociopathic vampire who has turned countless humans into servants. Obsessed with testing unproven vampiric theories, she seeks to validate a rule suggesting a vampire who loves a human will kill them through biting. Her current target is Mahiru. Eventually, her true motive emerges: she aims to become human by drinking the blood of someone she loves, believing this will reverse her vampirism.
Haru Nanakusa (七草 ハル, Nanakusa Haru)
Voiced by: Maaya Uchida (Japanese); Kira Vincent-Davis (English)
Haru was a vampire night-nurse and a friend of Kiku Hoshimi who investigated a method to revert back to being human, which eventually led to the birth of her daughter Nazuna.
LoveGreen
Voiced by: Tomokazu Sugita (Japanese); Joe Daniels (English)
LoveGreen—or LG (エルジー, Eru Jī) for short—is Midori's offspring and an otaku superfan of hers, referring to themselves in the third person.
Azami (アザミ)
Azami is an underling of Kiku Hoshimi who spent the last thirty-five years resolving any issues in human society caused by Hoshimi's other underlings.
Susuki (ススキ)
Susuki is an independent vampire vigilante who has made it her mission to silence anyone who poses a threat to the prosperity of vampires and makes them stand out in society, leading into conflict with Uguisu and Yamori.
Haruka Nanakusa (七草 ハルカ, Nanakusa Haruka)
Haruka is a scam artist in Hokkaido and an underling of Haru Nanakusa, whose name he took inspiration from for his alias after Haru's disappearance. Over forty years afterwards, Haruka crossed ways with Ko and met Haru's identical-looking daughter Nazuna Nanakusa.

== Media ==
=== Manga ===
Written and illustrated by Kotoyama, Call of the Night was serialized in Shogakukan's shōnen manga magazine Weekly Shōnen Sunday from August 28, 2019, to January 24, 2024. Kotoyama named the series after the song of the same name by Creepy Nuts, which later became the ending theme song for the anime adaptation. Shogakukan collected its chapters in 20 tankōbon volumes, released from November 18, 2019, to March 18, 2024.

On July 3, 2020, Viz Media announced an English release of the manga in North America. They released the volumes from April 13, 2021, to June 10, 2025. On May 9, 2023, Viz Media launched their Viz Manga digital manga service, with the series' chapters receiving simultaneous English publication in North America as they were released in Japan.

A short story series, titled Call of the Night: Paradise Arc (よふかしのうた-楽園編-, Yofukashi no Uta: Rakuen-hen), was serialized in Weekly Shōnen Sunday from July 2 to August 27, 2025. The collected volume was released on September 30, 2025. Viz Media has licensed it and the volume is set to release on December 8, 2026.

==== Volumes ====
No.	Original release date	Original ISBN	English release date	English ISBN
1	November 18, 2019	978-4-09-129492-0	April 13, 2021	978-1-9747-2051-4
1. "Call of the Night" (よふかしのうた, Yofukashi no Uta); 2. "A Pretty Big Mosquito" (大きめの蚊, Ōkime no Ka); 3. "Night Flight" (ナイトフライト, Naito Furaito); 4. "Do You Do LINE?" (てかラインやってる？, Teka Rain Yatteru?); 5. "Good Evening, Sadness" (悲しみよ、こんばんは, Kanashimi yo, Konbanwa); 6. "Akira" (アキラ); 7. "What's Your Name?" (お名前なんてーの？, Onamae Nantēno?); 8. "A Lot Came Out" (いっぽい出たね, Ippai Detane)
2	February 18, 2020	978-4-09-129556-9	June 8, 2021	978-1-9747-2057-6
9. "What Are You Thinking, Nazuna Nanakusa?" (なんのつもりだ七草ナズナ, Nan no Tsumori da Nanakusa Nazuna); 10. "Isn't This a Tight Squeeze?" (せまくない？, Semakunai?); 11. "Supply and Demand" (需要と供給, Jujō to Kyōkyū); 12. "Well, That's a Problem" (そりゃ困ったやつですね, Sorya Komatta Yatsu desu ne); 13. "Somewhere We Can Rest" (休憩できるお店, Kyōkei Dekiru Omise); 14. "One of the Beautiful People" (天才陽キャかな？, Tensai Yō Kya kana?); 15. "The Rokyo Pressure Point" (ここが労宮というツボです, Koko ga Rōkyō to Iu Tsubo desu); 16. "Boozing with Coworkers Is the Worst" (会社の飲み会 これが良くない, Kaisha no Nomikai - Kore ga Yokunai); 17. "I'll Keep You All Night" (あんたにはよふかしをしてもらう, Anta ni wa Yofukashi o Temorau); 18. "Might as Well Have Fun" (楽しい万がいいよ, Tanoshī Hōgai yo)
3	April 16, 2020	978-4-09-850064-2	August 10, 2021	978-1-9747-2080-4
19. "If I Can Be of Help" (俺が誰かの助けに, Ore ga Dareka no Tasuke ni); 20. "Reproduce" (眷属作(こづく)り, Kozukuri); 21. "Dropout from the School of Love" (恋愛学一生赤点みたいなやつ, Renai Gaku Isshō Akaten Mitai na Yatsu); 22. "Cheers!" (かんぱ〜い, Kanpai); 23. "All of Us" (どいつもこいつも, Doitsumo Koitsumo); 24. "Vampire Love Guru" (恋愛マスター吸血鬼, Renai Masutā Kyūketsuki); 25. "She's Been Busy" (お盛んなこって, Osakan Nakotte); 26. "You Know Those Harem Manga?" (ハーレムものってあるじゃないですか, Hāremu Monotte Aru ja Nai desu ka); 27. "What Are You to Her?" (あなたはセリさんのなんなの？, Anata wa Seri-san no Nan na no?); 28. "They Say Love Is Blind" (恋は盲目という言葉がある, Koi wa Mōmoku to Iu Kotoba ga aru); 29. "No Fair" (ずるい, Zurui)
4	August 18, 2020	978-4-09-850163-2	October 12, 2021	978-1-9747-2304-1
30. "Call Me Aki" (あっくんと呼んでくれ, Akkun to Yonde kure); 31. "Someone Conveniently Unpopular" (都合良くモテない知り合い, Tsugō Yoku Mote nai Shiriai); 32. "Enlarge the Peeping-Tom Photos" (盗撮画像を拡大して見る, Totogazō o Kakudai Shite Miru); 33. "We Might Find Out If We're Lucky" (運が良ければわかるかも, Un ga Yokereba Wakaru Kamo); 34. "Am I the Worst?" (最低だろうか, Saitei Darō ka); 35. "Not My Favorite Teacher" (この先生が苦手だった, Kono Sensei ga Nigate Datta); 35.5. "Let's Get Back to the Subject" (閑話休題, Kanwa Kyūdai); 36. "Mwa Ha Ha! I'm Driving Drunk!" (わははは飲酒運転だ〜！, Wahahaha Inshu Unten da~!); 37. "Too Dark to See" (暗くて見えない, Kurakute Mienai); 38. "Do You Know What a Vampire Is?" (吸血鬼って知ってるかい？, Kyūketsuki tte Shitterukai?); 39. "You Can Die Human" (あなたは人のまま死ぬ, Anata wa Hito no Mama Shinu)
5	October 16, 2020	978-4-09-850268-4	December 14, 2021	978-1-9747-2408-6
40. "Not That Bad" (案外悪くない, Angai Warukunai); 41. "When I Grow Up" (大人になったら, Otona ni Nattara); 42. "My Mom's Out Tonight" (今日ウチ親いないんだ, Kyōuchi Oya Inainda); 43. "I Don't See It That Way" (俺はあなたの考えを肯定できない, Ore wa Anata no Kangae o Kōtei Dekinai); 44. "What's There, Is There" (あるものが有ること, Arumono ga Arukoto); 45. "Let's Talk About Love" (恋バナしようや, Koibana Shiyōya); 46. "As Friends" (仲良くヤろうや, Nakayoku Yarōya); 47. "You Want to Talk About Ko, Don't You?" (夜守くんの話がしたいんでしょ？, Yamori-kun no Hanashi ga Shitain Desho?); 48. "Why?" (どうして？, Dōshite?); 49. "Didn't You Hear Me?" (私の話聞いてた？, Watashi no Hanashi Kīteta?)
6	January 18, 2021	978-4-09-850384-1	February 8, 2022	978-1-9747-2590-8
50. "It Began with Flowers" (始まりは花だった, Hajimari wa Hanadatta); 51. "Memories of Tokyo" (俺の東京に関する思い出, Ore no Tōkyō ni Kansuru Omoide); 52. "Not Our Time" (それは僕らの時間じゃない, Sore wa Bokura no Jikan Janai); 53. "We Wanna Hear Some Teenage Drama" (聞きてェー…中学生の恋バナ…, Kikitē...Chūgakusei no Koibana...); 54. "I've Been Wanting to Meet You" (会いたかったよ, Aitakatta yo); 55. "This Is the Thing" (ほんとにそれなんだ, Hontoni Sore Nanda); 56. "I'll Remember" (覚えてるよ, Oboeteru yo); 57. "No Ghosts in Haunted Houses" (おばけ屋敷にはおばけいない, Obake Yashiki ni wa Obakeinai); 58. "This Is the Condition" (条件ってこれ？, Jōkentte kore?); 59. "Everyone's a Liar" (みんな嘘つきねぇ, Minna Usotsuki nē)
7	April 16, 2021	978-4-09-850522-7	April 12, 2022	978-1-9747-2643-1
60. "You're Completely Wrong" (全然違うわよ, Zenzen Chigau wa yo); 61. "What Do You Want?" (君はどうなりたい？, Kimi wa dō Naritai?); 62. "Do You Want to Be Able to Run?" (走れるようになりたいかい？, Hashireru yō ni Naritai Kai?); 63. "Dear Kabura" (カブラちゃんへ, Kabura-chan e); 64. "The Few Years I Spent with You" (あなたと過ごした数年間, Anata to Sugoshita Sūnenkan); 65. "Oddly Passionate" (妙に情熱的, Myō ni Jōnetsuteki); 66. "I'll Never Tell!!" (教えまてん‼︎, Oshie Maten!!); 67. "I'm Not Asking About the Quality" (クオリティーを聞いてるんじゃねぇよ, Kuoritī o Kīterunja nē yo); 68. "Each of Those Lights" (あの光一つ一つ, Ano Hikari Hitotsu Hitotsu); 69. "Perfect for Self-Discovery" (自分探しにはもってこいだ, Jibunsagashi ni wa Mottekoida); Dagashi Kashi Omake: "On Staying Up Late" (夜更かしについて, Yofukashi ni Tsuite)
8	July 16, 2021	978-4-09-850635-4	June 14, 2022	978-1-9747-3008-7
70. "Can We Talk?" (お話いい？, Ohanashi ī?); 71. "Take Me Away" (私をここから連れ出してくれる, Watashi o Koko kara Tsuredashite Kureru); 72. "The Boy's in Shock" (夜守くんショック受けてんじゃん, Yamori-kun Shokku Uke Tenjan); 73. "A Fleeting School Rom-Com" (束の間の学園ラブコメ, Tsukanoma no Gakuen Rabukome); 74. "Good Morning" (おはよう先輩, Ohayō Senpai); 75. "Do As You Like" (お好きに。, Osuki ni.); 76. "You're Too Stupid" (七草さん馬鹿だから, Nanakusa-san Bakada kara); 77. "Maybe" (そうかもね, Sōkamo ne); 78. "Why Is Cheating Bad?" (浮気ってなんでだめなの？, Uwakitte Nande Damena no?); 79. "Even Me?" (相手があたしでも？, Aite ga Atashi Demo?)
9	November 18, 2021	978-4-09-850735-1	September 13, 2022	978-1-9747-3422-1
80. "You're My First" (先輩が初めてっすよ。, Senpai ga Hajimetessu yo.); 81. "Make Sure You Wait for Me" (ちゃんと持っててね, Chanto Mottete ne); 82. "Hey, Vampire" (やぁ、吸血鬼, Yaa, Kyūketsuki); 83. "I'm So Sorry" (まじでごめん。, Majide Gomen.); 84. "Good Luck Becoming the Real Thing" (立派な吸血鬼になれるといいな, Rippana Kyūketsuki ni Nareruto īna); 85. "I Can Do This!" (よーし がんばるぞ!, Yōshi Ganbaruzo!); 86. "What Do You Want to Do, Ko?" (夜守くん、君はどうしたい?, Yamori-kun, Kimi wa dō Shitai?); 87. "Ready to Get Serious?" (やっとやる気になった?, Yatto Yaruki ni Natta?); 88. "You're All Idiots" (だからお前らは馬鹿なんだよ, Dakara Omaera wa Bakananda yo); 89. "I Don't Have a Choice?" (やるしかないんだろ?, Yaru Shika Naindaro?)
10	February 18, 2022	978-4-09-850872-3	December 13, 2022	978-1-9747-3571-6
90. "Dear Yamori" (夜守くんへ, Yamori-kun e); 91. "I Wanted It to Be You" (せめてお前に, Semete Omae ni); 92. "Take Off Your Clothes" (服を脱ぎなさい, Fuku o Nuginasai); 93. "That's One Way to Put It" (まぁ言うなればそうだな, Maaiu Nareba Sōda na); 94. "Mwah" (んちゅ, Nchiyu); 95. "Did You Cut Your Hair?" (髪切った?, Kamikitta?); 96. "I'm Not Drunk" (私は酔ってない, Watashi wa Yottenai); 97. "I Needed to Fail" (失敗したいな, Shippai Shitai na); 98. "Women Are Complicated" (難しいな女って, Muzukashī na Onnatte); 99. "It's Hard to Be Normal" (普通に生きるって難しいな, Futsū ni Ikirutte Muzukashī na)
11	June 17, 2022	978-4-09-851127-3	March 14, 2023	978-1-9747-3676-8
100. "Hoshimi Kiku" (「星見キク」); 101. "She Frightens Me" (私はあいつがこわい, Watashi wa Aitsu ga Kowai); 102. "It's My Win, Then" (じゃあ俺の勝ちだな, Jā Ore no Kachida na); 103. "Listen to Others When They Talk" (人の話を聞けよ, Hito no Hanashi o Kikeyo); 104. "Rupture" (絶交, Zekkō); 105. "Awkward Atmosphere" (気まずいメンツ, Kimazui Mentsu); 106. "One Ought to Have Friends" (持つべきものは友達, Motsubeki Mono wa Tomodachi); 107. "He's Mad" (怒ってる…, Okotteru…); 108. "The Type I Hate" (苦手なタイプだ, Nigatena Taipuda); 109. "You're Still You" (お前はお前だろ, Omae wa Omae-daro)
12	July 15, 2022	978-4-09-851204-1	June 13, 2023	978-1-9747-3859-5
110. "A Real Home" (居場所, Ibasho); 111. "I Wonder If I Can Be Like That" (俺もなれるかな, Ore mo Nareru kana); 112. "Brute Force" (力ずくで, Chikarazuku de); 113. "Are You Gonna Turn Me Into a Murderer?" (俺を人殺しにするつもりか, Ore o Hitogoroshi ni suru Tsumorika); 114. "So, You Had a Thing for Me?" (私のこと好きだったの？, Watashinokoto Sukidatta no?); 115. "You're Fucking Hard to Protect" (守りづれェだろうが, Mamoridzure Edarouga); 116. "Goldfish-Shaped Soy Bottle" (金魚の醤油さし, Kingyo no Shōyu Sashi); 117. "The Way Vampires Fight" (吸血鬼の戦い方, Kyūketsuki no Tatakai-kata); 118. "For Real...?" (まじでぇ…?, Majide e…?); 119. "First Pierce" (ファーストピアス, Fāsuto Piasu)
13	September 15, 2022	978-4-09-851257-7	September 12, 2023	978-1-9747-4038-3
120. "What Are You?" (お前 結局どっちなんだ？, Omae - Kekkyoku Dotchinanda?); 121. "Kou-Pippi" (コウぴっぴ); 122. "I'm Home." (ただいま, Tadaima); 123. "Is That a 'Yes'?" (「イエス」ということですね, 'Iesu' toiu Kotodesu ne); 124. "Something You Need to Say" (言わなきゃいけないこと, Iwanakya Ikenai Koto); 125. "Well Done!" (よくできました！, Yoku Dekimashita!); 126. "Bitch…" (お前, Omae); 127. "Nothing" (別に 何も, Betsuni - Nani mo); 128. "Take a Bath and Sleep" (お風呂入って寝るだけ, O Furo Haitte Neru Dake); 129. "Good Night" (おやすみ, Oyasumi)
14	December 16, 2022	978-4-09-851474-8	December 12, 2023	978-1-9747-4100-7
130. "Yamori Kei" (夜守ケイ); 131. "Bye-Bye" (「ばいばい」, "Bai-Bai"); 132. "Hello" (こんにちは, Konnichiwa); 133. "If I'm Gonna Go" (「行くなら」, "Ikunara"); 134. "So, When Are You Going?" (どうする？ いつ行こっか, Dō suru? Itsu Ikokka); 135. "He's a Legit Dumbass." (「バカなんだわ根本的に」, "Bakananda wa Konpon-teki ni"); 136. "I'm Off" (行ってきます, Ittekimasu); 137. "Something's Changed About Him" (雰囲気変わった, Fun'iki Kawatta); 138. "You're Good At This" (やるじゃん, Yarujan); 139. "It's for Mahiru-kun" (マヒル君の分, Mahiru-kun no Bun)
15	March 16, 2023	978-4-09-851767-1	March 12, 2024	978-1-9747-4363-6
140. "I Might Be a Little Late" (遅くなるかもしれないから, Osoku naru Kamo Shirenaikara); 141. "Haruka" (ハルカ); 142. "Payback" (お返し, Okaeshi); 143. "I'm Not Playing Dirty." (卑怯じゃない, Hikyō Janai); 144. "Cleaning Up" (身辺整理, Shinpen Seiri); 145. "It's All for Your Goal!" (お前の目的のためだろ, Omae no Mokuteki no Tamedaro); 146. "The Feeling of Being Alive" (生きてる実感, Ikiteru Jikkan); 147. "A Nice Soundtrack" (曲はいい, Kyoku wa ī); 148. "You Make Guidebooks or Something, Right?" (しおりでも作るんだったな, Shiori Demo Tsukurundatta na); 149. "He Even Has Two" (しかも2本, Shikamo Ni-pon)
16	June 16, 2023	978-4-09-852123-4	June 11, 2024	978-1-9747-4578-4
150. "Seafood, or Something" (海鮮とかさぁ, Kaisen Tokasa); 151. "Love" (恋, Koi); 152. "Why Not Both?" (どっちもだろ, Dotchi Modaro); 153. "Hop On" (乗れ, Nore); 154. "Regarding You and Kiku" (お前とキクのこと, Omae to Kiku no Koto); 155. "Revenge or Whatever, Doesn't Matter" (「復讐なんてどうでもいいよ」, "Fukushū Nantedō Demo īyo"); 156. "Goodbye" (さようなら, Sayōnara); 157. "Hardenbergia" (ハーデンベルギア, Hādenberugia); 158. "In the End" (最後に, Saigoni); 159. "Love Ramblings" (ノロケ話, Noroke Banashi)
17	July 18, 2023	978-4-09-852615-4	September 10, 2024	978-1-9747-4872-3
160. "Because I'm His Friend, Too" (「あたしもあいつの友達だから」, "Atashi mo Aitsu no Tomodachi-dakara"); 161. "How About the Three of Us Go Together" (まわろうよ3人で, Mawarou yo San-ri de); 162. "All the Best" (お幸せに, Oshiawaseni); 163. "Sunrise After Dawn" (夜が明けるよ, Yogaakeru yo); 164. "Curse" (呪い, Noroi); 165. "Welcome Back" (おかえり, Okaeri); 166. "Quitting While Ahead" (勝ち逃げ, Kachi Nige); 167. "Celebration Party" (お疲れ様会, Otsukaresama-kai); 168. "I Wavered a Bit." (少し迷ってた, Sukoshi Mayotteta); 169. "I'd Keep That to Yourself" (心の中にしまっとけ, Kokoronouchi ni Shimattoke)
18	November 17, 2023	978-4-09-852855-4	December 10, 2024	978-1-9747-4941-6
170. "Welcome to My Home" (ようこそマイホームへ, Yōkoso Mai Hōmu e); 171. "Not Tonight" (今日はいいや, Kyō wa īya); 172. "What Time?" (何時がいい？, Nanji ga ī?); 173. "You Up?" (起きた？, Okita?); 174. "I Wanted to See You" (顔を見に, Kao o Mini); 175. "You're in for a Special Treat Tonight" (今日は特別, Kyō wa Tokubetsu); 176. "My New Home" (ニュー・マイ・ホーム, Nyū Mai Hōmu); 177. "Not a Nosebleed!" (鼻血はまずい!!, Hanadji wa Mazui!!); 178. "Beat It" (消えなさい, Kienasai); 179. "Take Care of Your Friendships" (大事にしなよ, Daijini Shina yo)
19	February 16, 2024	978-4-09-853115-8	March 11, 2025	978-1-9747-5215-7
180. "It's a Girl" (女だな, Onnada na); 181. "Have You Turned into a Foodie?" (グルメにでも目覚めたか？, Gurumeni Demo Mezameta ka?); 182. "Enjoy the Ride" (それでは行ってらっしゃいませ, Soredewa Itte Rasshaimase); 182.5. "How to Get"; 183. "This Summer" (夏になったらさ, Natsuni Nattarasa); 184. "My Crappy Special Skill" (クソみたいな特技, Kuso Mitaina Tokugi); 185. "There's This Girl Named Nazuna" (ナズナちゃんって子がいて, Nazuna-chan tteko Gaite); 186. "Excuse" (言い訳, Iiwake); 187. "More Beautiful Than Ever" (今までで一番, Imamade de Ichiban); 188. "Lukewarm!" ("ぬるい"ッ‼︎, "Nurui"!!); 189. "Cut the Cord" (弟離れ, Otōto Hanare)
20	March 18, 2024	978-4-09-853196-7	June 10, 2025	978-1-9747-5566-0
190. "Farewell Party" (お別れ会, O Wakare-kai); 191. "Like Vampires" (吸血鬼らしく, Kyūketsuki Rashiku); 192. "This Is Ridiculous" (「めちゃくちゃすぎる」, "Mechakucha Sugiru"); 193. "Fair and Square" (正々堂々, Seiseidōdō); 194. "Keeping Unusual Hours" (昼夜逆転, Chūya Gyakuten); 195. "It's Not Like There's Anywhere We Can Go" (どうせどこにも, Dōse Dokonimo); 196. "The Ocean Is Amazing" (すごいぞ海, Sugoizo Umi); 197. "Greater Than You Expected" (思ったよりだいぶ, Omottayori Daibu); 198. "The Night Is Longer in Winter" (冬は夜が長い, Fuyu wa Yoru ga Nagai); 199. "Ingenious Deduction: You Ought to Write a Novel" (面白い推理だね 小説家にでもなってみては？, Omoshiroi Suiridane: Shōsetsukani Demo Natte Mite wa?); 200. "Final Night: And Then" (最終夜「それから」, Saishū Yoru: Sore kara)
Extra	September 30, 2025	978-4-09-854245-1	December 8, 2026	978-1-9747-6944-5

=== Anime ===
In November 2021, an official website opened to announce an anime television series adaptation produced by Liden Films. It was directed by Tomoyuki Itamura, with Tetsuya Miyanishi serving as chief director for the first season, Michiko Yokote writing the series' scripts, Haruka Sagawa designing the characters and serving as chief animation director, and Yoshiaki Dewa composing the music. The first season aired from July 8 to September 30, 2022, on Fuji TV's Noitamina programming block. (Note: Fuji TV listed the series premiere as airing on July 7 at 24:55, which is effectively July 8 at 12:55 a.m. JST.) The opening theme song is "Daten" (堕天; lit. 'Fallen Angel'), while the ending theme song is "Yofukashi no Uta" (よふかしのうた; lit. 'Call of the Night'), both performed by Creepy Nuts. The duo also performed the insert song "Loss Time" (ロスタイム, Rosu Taimu).

At the Fuji TV Anime Lineup Press Conference 2024 event in March 2024, a second season was announced, which aired from July 4 to September 19, 2025, on the same programming block on Fuji TV and its affiliates. The opening theme song is "Mirage", while the ending theme song is "Nemure" (眠れ; lit. 'Sleep'), both also performed by Creepy Nuts.

Sentai Filmworks licensed the series for streaming on Hidive in North America, Europe, Oceania, and selected Latin American and Asian territories, which at their Otakon panel in July 2022, announced that the series would also receive an English dub, which premiered on September 8 of the same year. Sentai Filmworks also licensed the second season for streaming on Hidive, with the English dub premiering on September 3 of the same year.

== Reception ==
By June 2025, the manga had over 5.3 million copies in circulation.

=== Accolades ===
In 2020, the Call of the Night manga was nominated for the sixth Next Manga Awards and placed seventh out of the 50 nominees with 15,134 votes. The series ranked eighth on the "Nationwide Bookstore Employees' Recommended Comics of 2021" by the Honya Club website. In 2023, the series won the 68th Shogakukan Manga Award in the shōnen category, along with Ao no Orchestra.

The anime adaptation was nominated at the 7th Crunchyroll Anime Awards in three categories: Best New Series, Best Romance, and Best Ending Sequence ("Yofukashi no Uta" by Creepy Nuts). The second season's opening theme "Mirage" by Creepy Nuts was nominated for Best Opening Sequence at the 10th edition in 2026.

=== Critical reception ===
In Anime News Network's Summer 2022 preview guide, contributors generally responded positively to the series, praising the narrative, unique take on the common trope of vampires, and high production value, comparing it favorably to the Monogatari series, which series co-director Tomoyuki Itamura had previously worked on at Shaft.
