= No. 6 =

Japanese novel series by Atsuko Asano

- First novel volume cover
- Genre: Dystopian; Mystery; Science fiction
- Novel series
- Written by: Atsuko Asano
- Published by: Kodansha
- Imprint: Ya!Entertainment
- Original run: October 10, 2003 – June 14, 2011
- Volumes: 9
- Manga
- Written by: Atsuko Asano
- Illustrated by: Hinoki Kino
- Published by: Kodansha
- English publisher: NA: Kodansha USA
- Magazine: Aria
- Original run: January 28, 2011 – November 28, 2013
- Volumes: 9
- Anime television series
- Directed by: Kenji Nagasaki
- Written by: Seishi Minakami
- Music by: Keiichi Suzuki
- Studio: Bones
- Licensed by: AUS: Siren Visual; NA: Sentai Filmworks (expired)
- Original network: Fuji TV (Noitamina)
- Original run: July 8, 2011 – September 16, 2011
- Episodes: 11
- Novel series

No. 6 Reunited
- Written by: Atsuko Asano
- Published by: Kodansha
- Original run: May 28, 2025 – present
- Volumes: 4
- icon

No. 6 is a Japanese novel series written by Atsuko Asano and published by Kodansha in nine volumes between October 2003 and June 2011. A manga adaptation drawn by Hinoki Kino was serialized in Kodansha's Aria magazine from January 2011 to November 2013. An 11-episode anime television series adaptation produced by Bones, was broadcast on Fuji TV's Noitamina programming block from July to September 2011.

== Plot ==
The story takes place in a dystopian city known as No.6. Shion, a boy raised in an elite and privileged environment, gives shelter to another boy, who only gives his name as "Nezumi" (or "Rat") on Shion's twelfth birthday. What Shion soon discovers is how drastically life will change after meeting with the mysterious Nezumi, with whom he had shared one unforgettable, stormy night.

== Characters ==
Shion (紫苑)
Voiced by: Yuki Kaji (Japanese); Greg Ayres (English)
Shion is an intelligent and idealistic boy living in the dystopian city of No. 6. At age 12, he shelters Nezumi, a fugitive, and is subsequently stripped of his elite status, forced to relocate to the impoverished Lost Town. Four years later, while working in park maintenance, he uncovers a government cover-up involving parasitic wasps that kill his coworker. Arrested, he is rescued by Nezumi and taken to West Block. After surviving infection—which leaves him with white hair and a serpentine scar—he grapples with the harsh realities of his world. Over time, his bond with Nezumi deepens into romantic love, culminating in a farewell kiss before Nezumi departs.
Nezumi (ネズミ) (Rat)
Voiced by: Yoshimasa Hosoya (Japanese); Kalob Martinez (English)
Nezumi is a cynical and resourceful 16-year-old living in West Block after fleeing No. 6's authorities. Four years earlier, wounded and on the run, he encountered Shion, who sheltered him despite the risks. Now a skilled fighter and performer under the stage name Eve, Nezumi harbors deep resentment toward No. 6, which destroyed his village. When Shion is arrested, Nezumi rescues him, and the two take refuge in West Block. Though initially aloof, Nezumi grows deeply attached to Shion, his feelings evolving into love. After a near-fatal confrontation, he shares a passionate farewell kiss with Shion before departing, leaving their future uncertain.
Dogkeeper (イヌカシ, Inukashi)
Voiced by: Kei Shindō (Japanese); Luci Christian (English)
Dogkeeper is a brash but resourceful resident of West Block who operates a rundown hotel and rents out dogs as living heaters during winter. Running various underground trades, including dealing in goods smuggled from No. 6's Correctional Facility, they share a contentious yet cooperative relationship with Nezumi, often exchanging information. Raised by a dog they call "Mother", Dogkeeper deeply cares for canines and sometimes requests Nezumi to sing for deceased ones. Their gender remains ambiguous—while referred to with masculine pronouns in English translations, the novels suggest they may have been assigned female at birth.
Safu (沙布)
Voiced by: Kiyono Yasuno (Japanese); Hilary Haag (English)
Safu is Shion's childhood friend and a neurobiology prodigy in No. 6. Before leaving to study in No. 5, she confesses her feelings to Shion, who gently rejects her, valuing their friendship instead. Her time abroad alters her perception of No. 6, making her question its supposed utopian ideals. After her grandmother's death, she returns, only to be captured by No. 6's authorities and imprisoned in the Correctional Facility, where she becomes a test subject for inhumane experiments. Her ordeal highlights the city's hidden brutality.
Karan (火藍)
Voiced by: Rei Sakuma (Japanese); Lesley Pedersen (English)
Shion's mother runs a bakery in Lost Town after being exiled from Kronos alongside her son. When authorities falsely accuse Shion of murder and imprison him, she despairs until Nezumi covertly informs her of Shion's escape to West Block using messenger mice that evade city surveillance. Though deeply concerned for her son's safety, she resolves to persevere, maintaining hope for their eventual reunion. Her resilience reflects quiet defiance against No. 6's oppressive system.
Rikiga (力河)
Voiced by: Masaki Terasoma (Japanese); Chris Hutchison (English)
A West Block resident and former journalist, he operates a pornographic magazine while secretly managing a prostitution ring serving No. 6's officials, funding his luxurious lifestyle. Though an admirer of Nezumi's theatrical persona Eve, he receives only contempt from Nezumi himself. His past romantic feelings for Karan result in occasional kindness toward her son Shion, contrasting with his otherwise self-serving behavior.

== Development ==
The concept of No.6 was inspired by the September 11 terrorist attacks in 2001. Atsuko Asano watched the attack on television, causing her to ponder the nature of conflicts between an individual and the state, and wrote No.6 based around those themes. She has also described being influenced by the manga Banana Fish; highlighting the action elements, love between boys, and the relationship between a country and an individual as examples.

== Media ==
=== Novels ===
The No.6 novel series by Atsuko Asano was released in nine volumes by Kodansha between October 10, 2003, and June 14, 2011. A special volume called No.6 Beyond, which features stories from the lives of the characters before or after the main story, was published on November 22, 2012. Kodansha published nine bunkobon volumes from October 13, 2006, to July 15, 2014.

A sequel novel series, No.6 Reunited (No.6 再会, Nanbā Shikkusu Saikai), debuted with its first volume, published by Kodansha, on May 28, 2025. The sequel picks up the story two years after the events from the ending of No.6. As of September 30, 2026, four volumes have been released.

==== No. 6 ====
No.	Release date	ISBN
1	October 10, 2003	978-4-06-212065-4
2	February 10, 2004	978-4-06-212229-0
3	October 8, 2004	978-4-06-212585-7
4	August 22, 2005	978-4-06-269358-5
5	September 11, 2006	978-4-06-269371-4
6	September 21, 2007	978-4-06-269384-4
7	October 10, 2008	978-4-06-269397-4
8	July 21, 2009	978-4-06-269421-6
9	June 14, 2011	978-4-06-269443-8
Beyond	November 22, 2012	978-4-06-269463-6

==== No. 6 Reunited ====
No.	Release date	ISBN
1	May 28, 2025	978-4-06-538987-4
2	September 3, 2025	978-4-06-540414-0
3	May 28, 2026	978-4-06-543020-0
4	September 30, 2026	978-4-06-545060-4

=== Manga ===
A manga adaptation, illustrated by Hinoki Kino, was serialized in Kodansha's Shōjo manga magazine Aria from January 28, 2011, to November 28, 2013. Kodansha collected its chapters in nine tankōbon volumes, released between June 7, 2011, and March 7, 2014.

Kodansha USA licensed the series in North America, and released the nine volume between July 16, 2013, and October 21, 2014.

No.	Original release date	Original ISBN	English release date	English ISBN
1	June 7, 2011	978-4-06-380518-5	July 16, 2013	978-1-61262-355-9
2	September 7, 2011	978-4-06-380533-8	August 13, 2013	978-1-61262-356-6
3	January 6, 2012	978-4-06-380556-7; 978-4-06-362205-8 (LE)	October 22, 2013	978-1-61262-357-3
4	June 7, 2012	978-4-06-380575-8	December 17, 2013	978-1-61262-358-0
5	October 5, 2012	978-4-06-380593-2; 978-4-06-362233-1 (LE)	February 18, 2014	978-1-61262-359-7
6	March 7, 2013	978-4-06-380617-5	April 15, 2014	978-1-61262-360-3
7	August 7, 2013	978-4-06-380642-7; 978-4-06-380642-7 (LE)	April 15, 2014	978-1-61262-553-9
8	December 6, 2013	978-4-06-380660-1; 978-4-06-362265-2 (LE)	August 19, 2014	978-1-61262-578-2
9	March 7, 2014	978-4-06-380680-9	October 21, 2014	978-1-61262-811-0

=== Anime ===
An anime television series adaptation produced by Bones and directed by Kenji Nagasaki, aired in Japan on Fuji TV's noitamina programming block from July 8 to September 16, 2011. The opening theme is "Spell" by Lama while the ending theme is "Rokutōsei no Yoru" (六等星の夜) by Aimer. Sentai Filmworks has licensed the anime for American audiences and it was released on both DVD and Blu-ray on August 21, 2012. Rights to the series expired in 2018.

==== Episodes ====
No.	Title	Original release date	Ref.
1	"Drowned Rat"; Transliteration: "Bishonure Nezumi" (Japanese: びしょぬれネズミ)	July 8, 2011	
Twelve-year-old Shion sits in class, distracted by daydreams rather than focusing on the lesson. On his birthday, he visits his friend Safu's home after school to celebrate with her and her grandmother. When the gathering weather turns into a typhoon, Shion returns home. Standing on his balcony, he shouts into the storm, accidentally triggering an interior alarm that sends him back inside. At his window appears an injured boy of unknown origin. After gaining the boy's trust, Shion treats his wounds and learns his name is Nezumi. Shion soon discovers Nezumi is a wanted fugitive classified as a VC, yet continues providing assistance including food and shelter. By morning, Nezumi has disappeared, and Security Bureau officers arrive to question Shion about the encounter.
2	"City Adorned in Light"; Transliteration: "Hikari Matou Machi" (Japanese: 光まとう街)	July 15, 2011	
After harboring a VC, Shion loses his elite citizenship and is forced to relocate to the suburbs with his mother. Four years later, Safu departs to study abroad in No. 5. During their farewell, Shion encounters a rat that speaks with Nezumi's voice. While working as a park security officer, he witnesses a fatal parasitic outbreak where victims age rapidly, dying as wasps emerge from their necks. When authorities censor one such death from news reports, Shion begins questioning No. 6's governance. After his coworker succumbs to the parasite, Shion is arrested. During transport to a correctional facility, Nezumi rescues him, compelling Shion to destroy his ID bracelet during their escape. Beyond the city walls, Nezumi reveals the concealed truth about No. 6's dystopian reality.
3	"Life and Death"; Transliteration: "Sei to Shito" (Japanese: 生と死と)	July 22, 2011	
Shortly after escaping No. 6, Shion discovers he has been infected by a parasitic wasp. His symptoms progress slower than other victims, allowing Nezumi to extract the parasite after hearing Shion's desperate pleas. Though the procedure saves his life, it leaves permanent physical changes: white hair, red eyes, and a serpentine scar winding across his body. During recovery at a hotel operated by Dogkeeper—who provides warmth through rented dogs—Shion receives a message from his mother, facilitated by Nezumi. Through examination of the parasite, Shion deduces that mass emergence in spring will trigger widespread fatalities, with the Holy Day marking peak activation. While Nezumi celebrates this impending destruction of the city he despises, Shion insists on warning No. 6's citizens. Their opposing stances culminate in Nezumi's declaration that persisting to aid the city will make them enemies.
4	"Good and Evil"; Transliteration: "Ma to Sei" (Japanese: 魔と聖)	July 29, 2011	
At Karan's suggestion, Shion and Nezumi visit Rikiga, her former acquaintance. Rikiga recounts Karan rejecting his romantic advances and offers to shelter Shion, but Shion angrily refuses when Rikiga propositions Nezumi for sex work, prompting their departure. While assisting Dogkeeper with their dogs, Shion questions their history with Nezumi. Nezumi's abrupt interruption and irritation reveal his growing attachment to Shion—a vulnerability Dogkeeper recognizes. Convinced Shion has weakened Nezumi, Dogkeeper orders their dogs to attack him, though Shion's intervention halts the confrontation. In the aftermath, Shion confesses his choice to remain in the West Block with Nezumi despite his love for Karan, sending her a final farewell via one of Nezumi's rats.
5	"Angel of Death"; Transliteration: "Meifu no Tenshi" (Japanese: 冥府の天使)	August 5, 2011	
Another rapid-aging death occurs in No. 6—this time involving a caregiver from the Twilight House where Safu's grandmother resides. After learning of the incident from Rikiga, Shion rushes to Nezumi's theater performance to relay the news. During the play, Nezumi collapses after experiencing a hallucination of an eerie wind and melody. Simultaneously, in No. 5's art museum, Safu encounters the same phenomenon while observing a wasp-themed artwork, causing her to faint. Upon awakening, authorities inform Safu of her grandmother's death and order her immediate return to No. 6.
6	"Hidden Dangers"; Transliteration: "Hisoyakana Kiki" (Japanese: 密やかな危機)	August 12, 2011	
After returning to No. 6 following her grandmother's death, Safu notices discrepancies among the belongings—missing knitting needles and clothing lacking her grandmother's scent. During her visit to Karan's bakery, she learns about Shion's current situation. Shortly after leaving, Security Bureau agents apprehend Safu. Meanwhile, Shion and Nezumi debate No. 6's impending crisis involving the parasitic wasps. Karan's message about Safu's capture reaches Nezumi, who wrestles with whether to inform Shion. Knowing Shion would risk his life attempting a rescue, Nezumi ultimately chooses to conceal the information from him.
7	"True Lies, False Truths"; Transliteration: "Shinjitsu no Uso Kyokō no Shinjitsu" (Japanese: 真実の嘘・虚構の真実)	August 19, 2011	
Without informing Nezumi, Shion and Rikiga visit a used clothing store where Shion finds Safu's coat smuggled from the correctional facility—confirming her location. Meanwhile, Nezumi secretly pays Inukashi to gather intelligence on the facility, promising to sing at Dogkeeper's potential funeral. Unaware of Shion's discovery, Safu remains imprisoned as a test subject for researchers. That evening, Nezumi returns home to find Shion has prepared an elaborate meal. During dinner, Shion expresses gratitude for their meeting and kisses Nezumi goodbye—a silent farewell. The next morning, Shion attempts to leave for the facility alone, but Nezumi intercepts him. After a physical altercation, they reconcile and vow honesty. Nezumi then insists on showing Shion an undisclosed revelation.
8	"The Reason for That Is..."; Transliteration: "Sono Wake wa..." (Japanese: そのわけは...)	August 26, 2011	
To rescue Safu, Shion and Nezumi travel to the Western District's outskirts, encountering a legless elder who commands a group of men. The elder—who once named Nezumi—is revealed to be the researcher pictured with young Karan in Rikiga's photo. He discloses being the first parasitic wasp survivor and identifies Nezumi as the last descendant of the forest people exterminated by No. 6. When Nezumi experiences another vision of the haunting wind and song from his earlier collapse, his recitation causes the surrounding water to luminesce. The elder explains this phenomenon relates to Elyurias, the entity whose existence motivated No. 6's destruction of the forest community.
9	"Stage of Disaster"; Transliteration: "Saiyaku no Butai" (Japanese: 災厄の舞台)	September 2, 2011	
Rikiga and Inukashi execute a sting operation to extract intel from a client, obtaining facility maps and details of No.6's "cleaning operation". During the interrogation, Shion comforts Inukashi after the plan goes awry. Meanwhile, Karan learns the Twilight House's true purpose from Yoming while No.6 prepares for Holy Day celebrations. Military forces attack the West Block under the "cleaning operation" pretext. Shion rescues an orphaned infant during the assault, sending it to safety with Dogkeeper. Nezumi's plan succeeds as soldiers round up survivors—including Shion and Nezumi—for transport to the correctional facility. During transit, Nezumi rallies prisoners with song while privately admitting its limitations to Shion. Karan receives hope via rat messenger while Safu experiences a supernatural encounter with Elyurias in her cell. The group arrives at the facility as Yoming organizes resistance in No.6.
10	"What Lies in the Abyss"; Transliteration: "Naraku ni Aru Mono" (Japanese: 奈落にあるもの)	September 9, 2011	
Shion and Nezumi ascend the corpse pile in the correctional facility, navigating the complex with inexplicable precision that raises Nezumi's suspicions. While Rikiga and Dogkeeper infiltrate separately to secure an escape route, the pair battle through security forces. Nezumi sustains injuries during a confrontation, prompting Shion to lethally retaliate against their attacker—an act that distresses Nezumi. Upon reaching Safu's containment area, they discover she has liberated herself, surrounded by deceased researchers.
11	"Tell Me the Truth"; Transliteration: "Tsutaetekure, Arinomama o" (Japanese: 伝えてくれ、ありのままを)	September 16, 2011	
As the Holy Day begins, Shion and Nezumi reunite with Safu while Yoming's rebellion fails—he is killed as the parasites activate, slaughtering citizens. Nezumi recognizes Elyurias's control over Safu, who explains its desire to restore the land No. 6 destroyed. After confessing her love, Safu begs Nezumi to destroy "Mother", the facility's core. Nezumi fights a distraught Shion to plant explosives, then escapes with him as Safu remains behind. Nezumi is shot during their flight; Shion bandages him in an infirmary but is fatally wounded in the escape attempt. When Dogkeeper and Rikiga find them, Nezumi refuses to abandon Shion's body, singing as cyclones tear down No. 6's walls. A spectral Safu appears, singing alongside Elyurias's manifestation before both vanish in a blinding light—reviving Shion. With the walls destroyed, Nezumi kisses Shion farewell and departs. Shion, reunited with the rescued infant and Nezumi's dog Hamlet, destroys the legless man's tracking chip and returns to the city, hopeful for reunion.

=== Musical ===
A stage musical adaptation ran in Tokyo from November 8–17, 2024, and in Osaka from November 22–24. Sayaka Asai was in charge of direction, writing, and composing, while Satomi Taima was in charge of staging and choreography. The musical starred Hikaru Imamaki as Shion, Kazuki Furuta as Nezumi, Iroha Kumagai as Safu, Seishiro Higurashi as Dogkeeper, Kazuaki Yasue as Yoming, Yūki Fujiwara as White-Clothed Man, Kanako Irie as Karan, and Keigo Yoshino as Rikiga.

== Reception ==
Lara Adams of CBR praised the No. 6 anime series for its LGBTQ representation, stating, "[e]ven after 10 years, No. 6 is still one of the best examples of m/m relationships in anime, avoiding the worst of the usual tropes while telling the story of Rat and Shion's love with the care and respect that every LGBTQ narrative deserves."
