= Telepathy Shōjo Ran Jiken Note =

Japanese novel series

テレパシー少女「蘭」事件ノート (Terepashī Shōjo Ran Jiken Nōto)
- Novel
- Written by: Atsuko Asano
- Published by: Kodansha
- Imprint: Blue Bird Bunko
- Manga

Telepathy Shōjo Ran
- Illustrated by: Toshitsugu Iida
- Published by: Kodansha
- Magazine: Monthly Shōnen Sirius
- Original run: 2005 – 2009
- Volumes: 8
- Anime television series

Telepathy Shōjo Ran
- Written by: Makoto Nakamura
- Music by: Yoshihiro Ike
- Studio: TMS Entertainment
- Original network: NHK
- Original run: June 21, 2008 – December 20, 2008
- Episodes: 26

Telepathy Shōjo Ran Jiken Note (Japanese: テレパシー少女「蘭」事件ノート, Hepburn: Terepashī Shōjo Ran Jiken Nōto; lit. 'Telepathy Girl "Ran" Incident Notes') is a Japanese novel series by Atsuko Asano. A manga adaptation by Toshitsugu Iida was serialized in the shōnen manga magazine Monthly Shōnen Sirius. A twenty-six-episode anime adaptation aired in Japan between June 21 and December 20, 2008. It was produced by TMS Entertainment and was broadcast by NHK.

== Plot ==
A bright and energetic young girl, Ran is introduced to her supernatural powers right along with her first year in junior high school. While she is troubled by her powers seeming to instigate ill fortune upon people in contact with her and illuminating their ill intentions in some cases, Ran soon learns to accommodate her supernatural abilities and accept herself as is with the support of her family and peers. Accompanied by Rui, Ran finds herself constantly embroiled in mysterious circumstances and events whose resolution requires that she learn to collaborate with Midori (another girl who also has supernatural powers).

== Characters ==
=== Main characters ===
Ran Isozaki (磯崎 蘭, Isozaki Ran)
Voiced by: Emiri Katō
The protagonist in the story, Ran is introduced as a vivacious young lady having recently begun her first year in intermediate school where she engages in track and field as an extracurricular activity. Ran has always had a sense of insight about things that few other people can match. Ran is part of a traditional nuclear family (biological parents still married to each other) with an elder brother. She is in love with Rui.
Rui Ayase (綾瀬 留衣, Ayase Rui)
Voiced by: Hiroki Shimowada
Having been her long-standing childhood friend, Rui has artistic affinities and can easily detect when Ran is in distress about something when she starts up with the quick but brief laughing fits. Upon learning of her psychic powers, Rui indicates that he is fond of Ran for the person she is. He has the ability to neutralize and amplify psychic powers. He is frequently referred to as Ran's boyfriend, though neither of them deny the relationship.
Midori Naha (名波 翠, Naha Midori)
Voiced by: Kana Ueda
A recent transfer student that possesses the same kind of supernatural powers that Ran herself does, Midori initially appears as an enemy, but Ran's kindness results in the two teaming up and working together as friends. Despite their friendship, Midori is difficult to get along with, due to her large ego, her desire to be the center of attention, her obsession with money, and her schoolgirl crush on Ran's older brother. When she is not inviting herself on Ran and Rui's outings, participating in an eating contest, or helping to settle strange incidents, she is usually at home alone eating cuttlefish and watching historical dramas. Midori is less powerful, but showing a better control in psychic powers than Ran. She is also smart, intelligent, beautiful and strong. She even able to defeat bull in a contest.

=== Secondary characters ===
Rin Isozaki (磯崎 凛, Isozaki Rin)
Voiced by: Tomokazu Seki
Given how he is dressed most of the time and that he is introduced while doing housework, Rin is Ran's elder brother and is most likely in high school. Always having thought of Ran as being a little weird, Rin is not surprised to learn of his little sister's supernatural powers and wishes that he had some as well. Rin is the first to draw a preliminary correlation with the mysterious events at the start of the series and will likely become indispensable in the future for this reason considering how he has coached Ran through using her powers and helping to interpret what she learns through that means.
Reina Isozaki (磯崎 玲奈, Isozaki Reina)
Voiced by: Akemi Okamura
A novelist whose writer's block is broken by the idea to combine a horrific murder with a comedy show, Reina is Ran's mother and has aspirations to be a super-popular horror novelist.
Ronpei Isozaki (磯崎 論平, Isozaki Ronpei)
Voiced by: Ken'yū Horiuchi
Introduced as having a twelve-year history in a nukazuke company, a Japanese type of pickle, Ron is Ran's father and seems to have an affinity for advocating the virtues of lactic acid bacilli in the pickled vegetable chips he makes.
Kishō (キショウ)
Voiced by: Mari Kurata
Tenketsu (テンケツ)
Voiced by: Sumiko Ueda
Two young cats found by Ran while kittens, abandoned by their mother or previous owner. They seem to share a strong bond with her and often accompany her to bed.
Saeko Itō (いとう さえこ, Itō Saeko)
Saeko is Ran's academically-oriented classmate and best friend that is astonished that Ran secured a flawless score on a test in spite of her ignorance of the test material. Ran's explanation attempts greatly scare Saeko greatly since she had not yet vocalized her thoughts. Saeko's most prominent role is near the beginning of the series when her resentful dedication to rigorously studying in order to show up Ran who just happened to have serendipity (and perhaps the knowledge of how to take advantage of the testing format) on her side prompts Momoko to wield Saeko as a bodyguard to inhibit Ran rushing to Rui's rescue. A judo flip from Rin is more than enough to extinguish the subjugation.

== Adaptations ==
=== Anime ===
Telepathy Shōjo Ran (テレパシー少女蘭, Terepashī Shōjo Ran) is the 2008 anime adaptation of the novel series Telepathy Shōjo Ran Jiken Note. The anime aired on Saturdays between June 21 and December 20, 2008, except for a break on August 9, containing twenty-six episodes. The anime features an opening theme song "Aoi Kakera" (青いかけら) by Chara, and an ending theme song "Polaris no Namida" (ポラリスの涙) by Onsoku line.
