= Hama Okamoto =

Hama Okamoto ハマ・オカモト
- Born: Ikumi Hamada; 12 March 1991 (age 35); Tokyo, Japan
- Genres: Funk rock
- Occupation: Bassist
- Instruments: Bass guitar; fretless bass
- Label: Ariola Japan
- Member of: Okamoto's

Hama Okamoto (ハマ・オカモト; born 12 March 1991) is a bass guitarist and member of the rock band Okamoto's from Tokyo. He is represented with the agency Sony Music Artists. He is the eldest son of Downtown's Masatoshi Hamada and actress Natsumi Ogawa. His real name is Ikumi Hamada (濵田 郁未, Hamada Ikumi).

== Equipment used ==
- Fender Precision Bass made in 1968.
  Paddle peg which was adopted for only a few years from 66 years onboard.
- American Shawstar AS-57
  Made in the 1990s, the shield jack part glows like a tail lamp of an American car.
- Honey JET68-B
  Has an inspired inspiration from Echo rocket base
- Fender Precision Bass Hama Okamoto Model #4
- Fender Squier Katana made in 1985

== Related bands ==
- Okamoto's
- Zutto Zuletellz
- EdBUS

== Participating recordings ==
2009

Date	Artist	Recording
2 Dec	bRIAN Shinsekai	Eikō no Rockstar –Oretachi wa Lockstar nanda!– "Senkō Riot 2009"

2010

Date	Artist	Recording
9 Jun	Band A	girl's end "girl's end"
29 Sep	Gota & Kamui Supporters	Possible "Kamui "F1 Driver 'Kamui Kobyashi' Support Theme"
	SMA All Stars	Best Hit SMA –Song Meets Audience–

2011

Date	Artist	Recording
2 Feb	Miyavi	What's My Name? feat. Hama Okamoto (from Okamoto's) "What's My Name? e.p."
14 Dec	Asako Toki	heartbeat "Best! 2004-2011"

2012

Date	Artist	Recording
8 Feb	Gen Hoshino	Moshimo, Ranshi "Film"
25 Apr	Magokoro Brothers	Amenbo "Keep on travelin"
4 Jul	Gen Hoshino	Kanata "Yume no Soto e"
20 Nov	Masatoshi Hamada	Switch Furoku CD "Love Letter"
28 Nov	Gen Hoshino	Kisetsu "Shiranai"

2013

Date	Artist	Recording
30 Jan	Rina Sumioka	Harenohi "Harenohi"
8 May	Akai Kutsu	Hirninal Rain "Inorimasu no Mori"
8 May	Gen Hoshino	Dust "Gag"
29 May	Magokoro Brothers	Kienai E
16 Oct	Hiroshi Fujiwara	solfa, f.o. Hoka "manners"
6 Nov	Momoiro Clover Z	Gounn "Gounn"
13 Nov	Rip Slyme	Sly "Sly"
23 Dec	Rina Sumioka	We Are Never Ever Getting Back Together

2014

Date	Artist	Recording
26 Feb	Kana Hanazawa	last contrast "25"
11 Jun	Glim Spanky	Shōsō, Midnight Circus "Shōsō"
11 Jun	Gen Hoshino	Crazy Crazy, Night Troop "Crazy Crazy/Sakura no Mori"
23 Jun	Tortoise Matsumoto	"Wā'!/Chalida"
25 Jun	The Bawdies	Live At Billboard Live 20140317 *Shokai Gentei-ban Bonus Track "Nice And Slow / Come On"
12 Nov	Rina Sumioka	Namida Biyori, Colorful Monochrome "watchword"
3 Dec	Charan-Po-Rantan	Workaholic "Theater Theater"

2015

Date	Artist	Recording
21 Jan	Bomi	Getsuyō no Melancholy, Matataku Speed de "Born In The U.S.A."
8 Mar	Ucari & The Valentine	I'm In Love With You "New Dance"
13 May	Mashimaro	"Garan to shi teru"
22 May	Char	Tokio Drive "Rock Jū"
27 May	Gen Hoshino	Sun "Sun"
24 Jun	Hey! Say! JUMP	Disco Jockey!!! -Bonus Tracks- "Jumping Car"
	Puffy AmiYumi	Colorful Wave Surfers, Coco Hawaii
16 Sep	sébuhiroko	Lost Highway "Wonderland"
28 Oct	Aki Yashiro	Give You What You Want "Aiuta"
	Miyavi	Express It "Citizen Attesa 2015 no CM Song"
2 Dec	Gen Hoshino	Week End, Tokiyo "Yellow Dancer"

2016

Date	Artist	Recording
17 Feb	Momoiro Clover Z	Mahoro Vacation "Hakkin no Yoake"
20 Apr	Shiritsu Ebisu Chugaku	Acne "Ana Sora"
6 Jul	Ken Hirai	Kyōi no Bonsai "The Still Life"
3 Aug	Kayoko Yoshizawa	Avocado feat. Ichiyo Izawa " to Utsukushī Hito-tachi"
28 Sep	Kyoko	Ikasama Binanshi feat. Linda "Ikasama Binanshi feat. Linda / Magenta Butterfly"
5 Oct	Gen Hoshino	Koi, Drinking Dance "Koi"

2017

Date	Artist	Recording
8 Feb	Miyu Koike	Koisuru Futari wa, Hitorigoto "Koisuru Futari wa"
15 Feb	Hana Sekitori	Moshimo Boku ni, Heibon na Mainichi "Kimi ni yoku Nita Hito ga iru"
15 Mar	Kayoko Yoshizawa	Utopia "Yaneura-jū"
22 Mar	Charisma.com	classic glasses "not not me"
22 Mar	Onigawara	Hit Chart o Nerae! "Hit Chart o Nerae!"
12 Apr	Ai Otsuka	Hey! Bear "Love Honey"
17 May	Juon	my girl
21 Jun	Juon	T.N.C
16 Aug	Gen Hoshino	Purin "Family Song"

== Productions ==
Date	Artist	Recording	Notes
12 Nov 2014	Rina Sumioka	Namida Biyori, Colorful Monochrome "watchword"	Sound producer
3 Dec 2014	Charan-Po-Rantan	Workaholic "Theater Theater"	Sound producer with Ucary & The Valentine
24 May 2016	Negicco	SNS o Buttobase "Tea for Three"	Producer
15 Mar 2017	Kayoko Yoshizawa	Utopia "Yaneura-jū"	Sound producer; recording members were Tomotaka Imamichi (Hitosarai/Barbee Boys; G.), Hama Okamoto (B.), Keisuke Okamoto (Kuroneko Chelsea; P.), Hiroko Sebu (P.), Team Mio Okamura (S.)
22 Mar 2017	Charisma.com	classic glasses "not not me"	Sound producer

== Live support ==
- Yo-King
- Hiroshi Fujiwara
- Magokoro Brothers
- Shigeru Suzuki×Ino Hidefumi
- Gen Hoshino
- The Bawdies
- Tamio Okuda
- Kayoko Yoshizawa

== Filmography ==
=== TV programmes ===
Dates	Title	Network	Notes	Ref.
30 Oct 2014 –	Big Audio Dynamite	Space Shower TV	Irregular broadcasts; in charge of music programme, MC focused on the band's rhythm corps	
9, 16 Jan 2015	Tamori Club	EX	"Aurora Awards! 2015" Judge and Guest; 18 Mar 2016 – "Hebirote at the Musical Instrument Department! Trial Playing Ranking"; 31 Mar 2017 – "It's Beautiful! Feel Good!! All Japan One Touch Championship"	
31 Mar 2015 –	Full Chorus: Ongaku wa Full Chorus	BS Sukapā!	MC in charge with Becky	
5 Jun 2015 –	Music Station	EX	First appearance in his own band Okamoto's; 23 Sep 2015, Ultra Fes - As a member of Ringo Sheena's back band; 25 Dec 2015, Super Live - As a member of Gen Hoshino's back band	
28 Feb 2016	Sky PerfecTV! Music Festival	BS Sukapā!	Main charge MC; sub MC, Shiori Tamai (Momoiro Clover Z)	
5 Aug 2016	Musica Piccolyno	NHK E	Appears as electric base expert "Signoré Hammer"	
18 Oct 2016	Utacon	NHK G	Collaborated with Sayuri Ishikawa and AyaBambi; showed off the drunk weather with George Yanagi	
	Shakiin!	NHK E		
31 May 2017	Shosuke Tanihara no 25-ji gohan	TBS		

=== Radio programmes ===
Title	Network
Music Freaks	FM802
Radipedia	J-Wave
Rock With You	J-Wave

== Others ==
Artist	Recording	Notes
Negicco	"Sunshine Nihonkai"	In charge of band comment on regular board
