= Okamoto's =

Japanese rock band

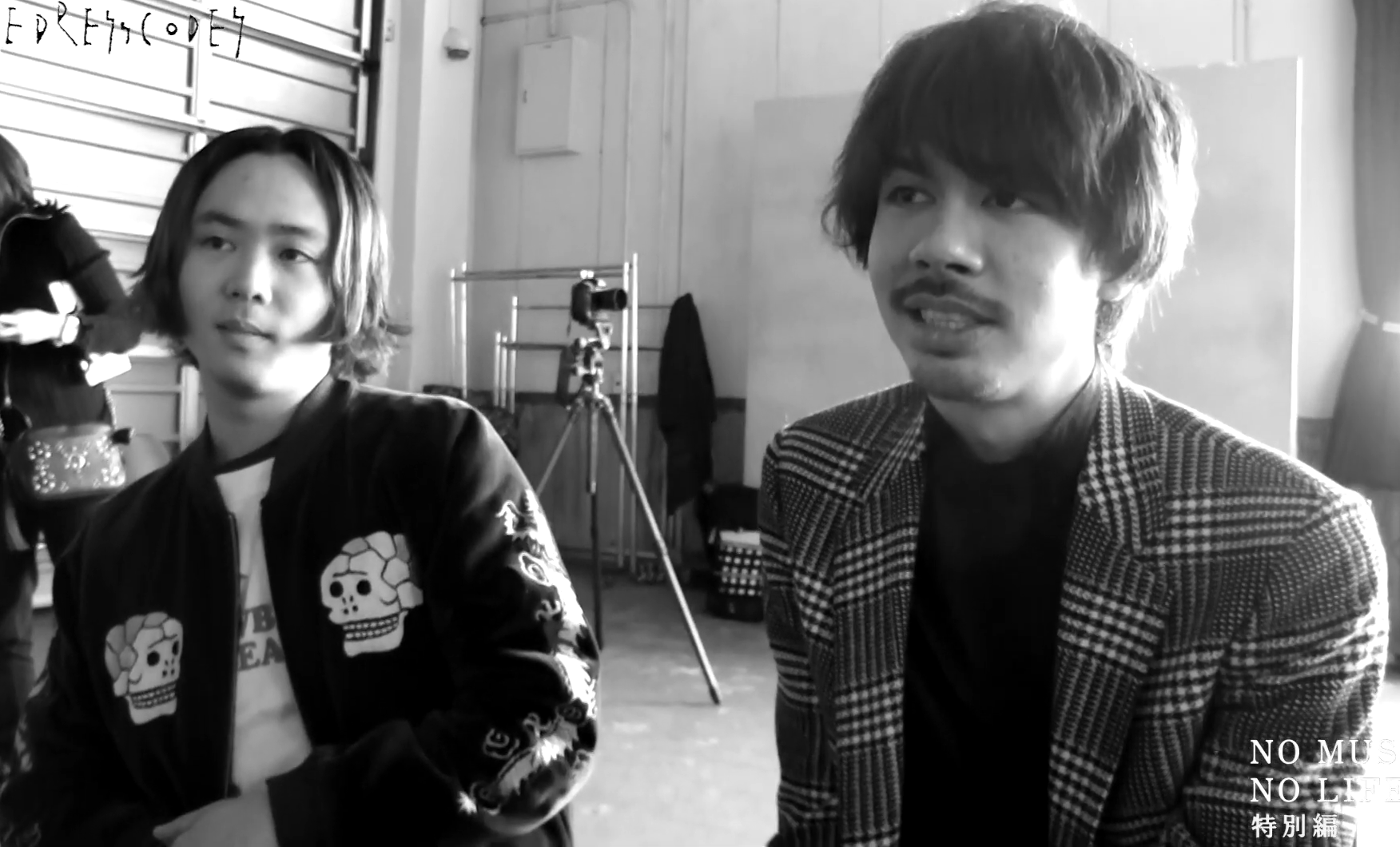
- Reiji (left) and Shō (right) in 2020

Background information
- Origin: Japan
- Genres: Rock, garage rock
- Years active: 2006–present
- Labels: Ariola Japan
- Members: Shō Okamoto; Kōki Okamoto; Reiji Okamoto; Hama Okamoto
- Past members: Masaru Okamoto
- Website: www.okamotos.net

Okamoto's (stylized in all caps) is a Japanese rock band, formed in 2006. They made their major label debut on May 26, 2010, and were signed by Ariola Japan.

== Career ==
Okamoto's was formed by four junior high school students. Fans of influential Japanese avant-garde artist Tarō Okamoto, the members took a cue from The Ramones and each adopted stage names with the surname Okamoto.

Okamoto's made their recording debut with an appearance on the Columbia compilation "Here Come the Modernity" in February 2009, then followed it up in June with their debut album, Here Are Okamoto's. Soon after, Masaru Okamoto left the band and was replaced by Hama Okamoto. In support of the album, they gave a sold-out solo performance to commemorate its release. Playing over ten shows a month, they managed to perform over one hundred times in 2009.

In March 2010, they performed at the South by Southwest music festival in Austin, Texas, and also performed in 6 other cities in the United States as part of the Japan Nite tour.

On May 26, 2010, they made their major label debut under the Ariola Japan record label, an affiliate of Sony Music Entertainment Japan. They produced the major debut single, "Yokubō o Sakebe!!!" (欲望を叫べ!!!; "Shout Out Your Desires!!!"), which is used for the ending theme of the anime series Naruto.

On February 4, 2015, Okamoto's 6th single "Headhunt" was used as the opening theme for the anime series Durarara!!.

In 2016, Okamoto's released their 9th single "Brother" as the ending theme for the Netflix series Hibana: Spark. In 2020, the Okamoto's song "Welcome My Friend" was used as the ending theme for the anime series Fugou Keiji: Balance Unlimited.

In 2023, the Okamoto's song "Where Do We Go?" was used for the ending theme for the third season of the anime Dr. Stone.

== Members ==
- Shō Okamoto (オカモトショウ, Okamoto Shō) – vocals

Real name Shō Īmura (飯村 翔, Īmura Shō). Born October 19, 1990 in New York City. Former member of Zutto Zuletellz (ズットズレテルズ, Zuttozureteruzu) and the children's performance group Precoci. Eldest son of American jazz saxophonist Scott Hamilton.

- Kōki Okamoto (オカモトコウキ, Okamoto Kōki) – guitar

Real name Kōki Hayashi (林 幸希, Hayashi Kōki). Born November 5, 1990 in Nerima City, Tokyo, Japan.

- Reiji Okamoto (オカモトレイジ, Okamoto Reiji) – drums

Real name Reiji Miyake (三宅 零治, Miyake Reiji). Born January 9, 1991 in Futako-Tamagawa, Setagaya, Tokyo. Former Zutto Zuletellz member. He is the eldest son of The Privates lead singer Tatsuji Nobuhara (延原達治, Nobuhara Tatsuji). In his childhood he was a child actor in TV dramas.

- Hama Okamoto (ハマ・オカモト) – bass (2009–present)

Real name Ikumi Hamada (濵田 郁未, Hamada Ikumi). Born March 12, 1991 in Tokyo. Former Zutto Zuletellz member. He is the eldest son of Masatoshi Hamada and Natsumi Ogawa.

Former members

- Masaru Okamoto (オカモトマサル, Okamoto Masaru) – bass (2006–2009)

== Discography ==
=== Studio albums ===
- Here Are Okamoto's (June 3, 2009)
- 10's (May 26, 2010) Oricon Albums Chart Peak Position: No. 63
- Okamoto's ni Muchū (オカモトズに夢中, Okamotozu ni Muchū; November 3, 2010) No. 55
- Yokubō (欲望; September 7, 2011) No. 44
- Okamoto's (January 23, 2013) No. 30
- Let It V (January 15, 2014) No. 14
- VXV (August 27, 2014) No. 27
- Opera (September 30, 2015) No. 27
- No More Music (August 02, 2017) No. 21
- Boy (January 9, 2019) No. 13
- Kno Where (September 29, 2021)

=== Extended plays ===
- Count 1000 EP (December 22, 2009)
- BL-EP (December 21, 2016) No. 139
- Welcome My Friend (August 26, 2020)

=== Live albums ===
- Live Rare Trax (July 24, 2017)
- Live (May 31, 2017) No. 46

=== Singles ===
- "Yokubō o Sakebe!!!!" (欲望を叫べ!!!!; August 3, 2011) Oricon Singles Chart Peak Position: No. 79
- "Majime ni Nattara Namida ga Deruze"/"Aoi Tengoku" (マジメになったら涙が出るぜ/青い天国; July 18, 2012) No. 64
- "Love Song"/"Kyōhansha" (ラブソング/共犯者, Rabu Songu/Kyōhansha) October 31, 2012 No. 54
- "Joy Joy Joy"/"Kokuhaku" (告白; October 31, 2013) No. 79
- "Sexy Body" (November 6, 2013) No. 78
- "Headhunt" (February 4, 2015) No. 26
- "Dance With Me"/"Dance With You" (June 17, 2015) No. 36
- "Beautiful Days" (November 25, 2015) No. 55
- "Brother" (June 1, 2016) No. 44

=== Limited singles ===
- "Zeroman (Movie Ver.)" (March 1, 2015)
- "Burning Love" (September 9, 2016)
- "Rocky" (October 14, 2016)
- "90's Tokyo Boys" (July 14, 2017)
- "Dreaming Man" (December 14, 2019)
- "Higher" (December 14, 2019)

=== Home videos ===
- Okamoto's 5th Anniversary Happy! Birthday! Party! Tour! Final @ Hibiya Open-air Music Hall (March 18, 2015) Oricon DVDs Chart Peak Position: No. 58
