= The Millionaire Detective Balance: Unlimited =

Japanese anime television series

- Promotional poster
- 富豪刑事 Balance:UNLIMITED; Fugō Keiji Baransu Anrimiteddo
- Genre: Comedy, detective, mystery
- Created by: Yasutaka Tsutsui
- Based on: The Millionaire Detective by Yasutaka Tsutsui
- Written by: Taku Kishimoto
- Directed by: Tomohiko Itō
- Voices of: Mamoru Miyano; Yūsuke Ōnuki
- Music by: Yugo Kanno
- Opening theme: "NAVIGATOR" by SixTones
- Ending theme: "Welcome My Friend" by Okamoto's
- Country of origin: Japan
- Original language: Japanese
- No. of episodes: 11

Production
- Executive producers: Atsuhiro Iwakami; Kyōichi Takeda; Masao Takiyama; Ryū Utsui; Shingo Kunieda
- Producers: Akitoshi Mori; Shunsuke Nara; Taku Matsuo
- Cinematography: Toshiaki Aoshima
- Animator: CloverWorks
- Editor: Shigeru Nishiyama
- Running time: 23 minutes
- Production companies: Fuji Television; CloverWorks; Aniplex; Animax; Movic; Dentsu

Original release
- Network: Fuji TV (Noitamina)
- Release: April 9 – September 24, 2020

The Millionaire Detective - Balance: Unlimited (Japanese: 富豪刑事 Balance:UNLIMITED, Hepburn: Fugō Keiji Baransu Anrimiteddo) is a Japanese anime television series produced by CloverWorks, directed by Tomohiko Itō and inspired by the novel The Millionaire Detective written by Yasutaka Tsutsui.

It premiered on April 9, 2020, on Fuji TV's Noitamina anime programming block, but postponed programming after the second episode due to the COVID-19 pandemic. The series restarted its broadcasting from July 16 to September 24, 2020.

== Plot ==
Daisuke Kambe, a detective with extreme personal wealth, is assigned to the Modern Crime Prevention Headquarters. Officers who have caused problems for the Metropolitan Police Department are sent to this place. Daisuke is partnered with Haru Katou, who is repulsed by Daisuke's bribery. Challenging mysteries unfold in front of the two detectives, who must work together to solve them.

== Characters ==
Daisuke Kambe (神戸大助, Kanbe Daisuke)
Voiced by: Yūsuke Ōnuki (Japanese); Adam Rowe (English)
The current head of the eminently wealthy and influential Kambe family. As a police officer, he uses his fabulous wealth and a collection of cutting-edge gadgets to solve crimes pragmatically, often resorting to outright bribery as his preferred investigative method. Furthermore, Daisuke is a skilled fighter with a surprisingly steel nerve, which is unfazed even in the face of dangers. He is currently a member of the Modern Crimes Prevention Task Force and frequently works with detective Haru Kato, who is frequently annoyed by Daisuke's habits of solving things with money. An artificial intelligence butler, HEUSC, usually assists Daisuke. The state-of-the-art aide commonly assists him in transferring money and hacking into other devices.
Haru Katō (加藤春, Katō Haru)
Voiced by: Mamoru Miyano (Japanese); Ricco Fajardo (English)
A young detective on the same task force as Kambe Daisuke, though he was previously a Division 1 detective but was forcibly transferred out after an incident embarrassing to the police. He is passionate about his job but has a quick temper, especially around Kambe or when innocent people are in danger. In particular, he is annoyed by Kambe's attitude that money can solve any problem.
Yukihiro Kiyomizu (清水幸宏, Kiyomizu Yukihiro)
Voiced by: Kōzō Shioya (Japanese); Ben Phillips (English)
The ranking officer of the Modern Crimes Prevention Task Force, Kambe, and Kato's boss. He is very laid-back and quite cheerful and places a great deal of trust in his subordinates. He is usually found at his desk, enjoying his hobby of building plastic models.
Chо̄suke Nakamoto (仲本長介, Nakamoto Chōsuke)
Voiced by: Akira Kamiya (Japanese); Kent Williams (English)
The oldest member of the task force and a veteran detective, formerly of the Investigative Division. Kato is highly respectful of Nakamoto's abilities and experience. He comes across as very sympathetic and uses this to manipulate confessions out of criminals. He is a lifelong chain-smoker.
Shinnosuke Kamei (亀井新之助, Kamei Shinnosuke)
Voiced by: Kentarō Kumagai (Japanese); Aaron Roberts (English)
Another member of the task force works only when he wants to and does not particularly enjoy his job. His main goal is to impress Motoyama from Security Division, on whom he has a substantial crush. The very mention of her name has a visible effect on his level of enthusiasm.
Mahoro Saeki (佐伯まほろ, Saeki Mahoro)
Voiced by: Reina Ueda (Japanese); Luci Christian (English)
The only woman on the task force with an addiction to sweets and snacks. She is normally found at headquarters, either drinking cups of tea or checking for new jobs around the office.
Teppei Yumoto (湯本鉄平, Yumoto Teppei)
Voiced by: Shinya Takahashi (Japanese); David Matranga (English)
Another member of the task force. He loves gambling with a preference for horse and boat racing.
Katsuhiro Takei (武井克弘, Takei Katsuhiro)
Voiced by: Rikiya Koyama (Japanese); Christopher R. Sabat (English)
The current chief of Division 1, Kato's former boss. He prefers to take charge of himself; as such, all his subordinates place a great deal of trust in him. Despite no longer being Kato's boss, he still cares about him.
Ryо̄ Hoshino (星野涼, Hoshino Ryō)
Voiced by: Junya Enoki (Japanese); Jordan Dash Cruz (English)
A detective from Division 1. He takes his job very seriously. It is implied he was Kato's partner in the past, but they now appear to have a strained relationship.
Suzue Kambe (神戸鈴江, Kanbe Suzue)
Voiced by: Maaya Sakamoto (Japanese); Michelle Rojas (English)
A genius mechanic and Daisuke Kambe's relative. She uses her innocent appearance to her advantage, enabling her to perform undercover work. She and Kambe live together in the family mansion and have a good relationship. Despite the dangers of her work, Kambe never stops her as he knows she is competent. While working together, she and Kambe are a highly effective team.
HEUSC (ヒュスク, Hyusuku)
Voiced by: Kazuyuki Okitsu (Japanese); Jim Foronda (English)
Described as Kambe's butler who only communicates through Kambe's earpiece and the computer screen in his sunglasses. HEUSC is an advanced Artificial intelligence program that instantly responds to Kambe's requests and can seemingly manipulate other computer systems at will.

== Production and release ==
On January 20, 2020, Noitamina announced that a new anime television series directed by Tomohiko Itō was in production. The series is animated by CloverWorks, with Taku Kishimoto handing series composition, Keigo Sasaki designing the characters, and Yugo Kanno composing the series' music. The opening theme titled "Navigator" is performed by SixTones while Okamoto's performs the series' ending theme song "Welcome My Friend". The series premiered its first two episodes on April 9, 2020, and April 16, 2020, respectively, but had to delay later episodes due to the COVID-19 pandemic. The series restarted its broadcasting on July 16, 2020, and ended on September 24, 2020.

Aniplex of America licensed the series, and streamed the series internationally outside Asia on FunimationNow, AnimeLab, and Wakanim. In Southeast Asia and South Asia, the series is licensed by Medialink and released on Ani-One YouTube channel, and iQIYI in Southeast Asia.

=== Episodes ===
No.	Title (Note: All English titles are taken from Funimation.)	Written by	Original release date
1	"I Came, I Saw, I Sponsored"; Transliteration: ""Kita, mita, katta"" (Japanese: 「来た、見た、買った」)	Tomohiko Itō	April 9, 2020
Detectives Haru Kato and Shinnosuke Kamei from Japan's Modern Crimes Prevention Task Force are asked to assist security during a festival, where First Division officers are trying to locate a bomber targeting a foreign prince. Two amateur thieves, Yoko and Hiroshi, observe jewellery stores for a potential robbery. The ridiculously wealthy Daisuke Kanbe meets the Police Superintendent, Haru, and requests a place on a squad of his choice. The bomber is arrested while the amateur thieves accidentally rob a sweet shop instead of a jewellery store and unknowingly flee in the bombers' van with the bomb to escape from the police. During their pursuit to stop the bomb-containing van, Daisuke inflicted damage on nearby vehicles and public facilities. He immediately reimbursed all the repair costs with double the damage costs through his artificial intelligence assistant, HUESC. The wealthy detective successfully pushes the van into a river to prevent a blast. At the same time, Haru rescues the thief. He then falls into the river while an amused Daisuke watches. Costs incurred in this episode: ¥ 1,369,800,000 (£ 10,055,332, US$ 12,822,081)
2	"Love Does Much, Money Does Everything"; Transliteration: "Ai wa Ōku o Nashieru ga, Kane wa Subete o Nashieru" (Japanese: 愛は多くを成し得るが、金は全てを成し得る)	Shunsuke Ishikawa	April 16, 2020
Daisuke arrests two street performers for buying a drug, Mescaline, and bribes them for their dealer's name. They identify the model Isezaki as the dealer and witness him selling drugs, but Daisuke decides not to arrest him. They learn that the narcotics came from the organized crime group Gondawara Gumi, run by mob boss Umezu. Kato decides to follow the drug dealer's latest girlfriend, only to follow her to a co-worker's mansion. He learns she is Suzue Kanbe, Daisuke's relative working undercover. She discovered that Umezu(Gondawara Gumi's mob boss) is attending a party. Kato infiltrates the party and steals Umezu's phone for evidence. He managed to escape with the help of a friend, a journalist named Mita, who was helping with the investigation, and Daisuke, who had HEUSC purchase the building before attacking it with sleeping gas. The entire crime group is arrested for drug smuggling and murdering a fashion model. Costs incurred in this episode: ¥ 83,006,110,000 (£ 609,469,117, US$ 776,941,339)
3	"The Sinews of War Are Infinite Money"; Transliteration: "Kin wa Senryokunari" (Japanese: 金は戦力なり)	Hirosa Itō	July 30, 2020
Kato is brought to meet Daisuke and Suzue's grandmother, who asks Kato to make Daisuke a good policeman. Kato becomes involved in an incident when a young man takes several music fans hostage. Kato's former Division 1 colleague arrives, causing him to flashback to an incident that rendered his gun-shooting abilities useless. Daisuke arrives at the scene, but rather than leaving with Daisuke, Haru decides to stay back and learns the man is streaming the incident live. Haru asks Daisuke to help him, so Daisuke launches smoke grenades, and they infiltrate the train. Division 1 Chief Takei orders Kato to shoot the man. Instead, Kato has HEUSC hack the man's emails and learns he aims to win prize money from Chaintube by reaching 10 million views so his sick sister can have surgery. The hostages, desperate to see their favorite band Yokorenbo's last concert, attack, but Daisuke distracts them by paying to have Yokorenbo sing outside the train. Kato has a chance to shoot but hesitates, so Daisuke steps in and pays for the sister's surgery himself. Instead of being disappointed with the crisis, Takei praises Kato for a job well done.. Costs incurred in this episode: ¥ 1,271,500,000 (£ 9,175,590, US$ 12,012,686)
4	"Nothing Makes A Man so Adventurous as an Empty Pocket"; Transliteration: "Karappo no Poketto hodo, Jinsei o Bōken Teki ni Suru Mono wa Nai" (Japanese: 空っぽのポケットほど、人生を冒険的にするものはない)	Aya Ikeda	August 6, 2020
Kato asks Daisuke to find a child's lost puppy with HEUSC. Daisuke realizes that having stormed out of his house in a bad mood, he forgot the earring he used to contact HEUSC and lost his phone. Kato leaves the child with local police before Daisuke reveals his lack of access to his money. Suzue panics after learning Daisuke is loose in public without HEUSC. Their grandmother thinks the experience will be good for Daisuke. Daisuke goes shopping with Haru and then to his apartment for a night-stay, where he shows a lack of basic life skills. Haru asks why Daisuke joined the Modern Crimes Taskforce, but Daisuke falls asleep before answering. Suzue stays up all night worrying about Daisuke surviving. The next day, Haru spends all day looking for the dog. Daisuke appears with the lost dog, delighting the child, but secretly informs Haru that he learned the original dog was killed by a car. Hence, the wealthy detective bought the dog's identical sibling from the local breeder. Costs incurred in this episode: ¥ 55,616 (£ 402, US$ 523)
5	"If Money be not thy Servant, it will be thy Master"; Transliteration: "Moshi Kin o Nanji no Meshitsukai to Shinakereba, Kin wa Nanji no Shujin to Narudarō" (Japanese: もし金を汝の召使としなければ、金は汝の主人となるだろう)	Satoshi Saga	August 13, 2020
The task force is assigned to protect President Alvarez of Poliador, as there are concerns that terrorists want to kill him. Daisuke, however, attends the embassy as Alvarez's guest. Alvarez wants the Kanbe family's help to modernize Poliador but faces tough opposition from indigenous protestors. An infiltrator retrieves a package and murders the embassy chef to keep it secret. Haru and the task force befriend an elderly embassy janitor. Daisuke and Alvarez are sent to a safe room after discovering the chef's corpse. Daisuke has HEUSC hack security cameras so he can observe the situation. Haru chases the murderer fleeing the embassy while HEUSC retrieves footage showing the murderer planting a tear gas canister, designed by a Kanbe Group company, filled with VX gas inside the safe room with Daisuke and Alvarez. Haru catches the murderer, who disposes of the only key to the safe room down a drain, hoping Alvarez's death will prevent the dam from destroying his indigenous land. He then commits suicide before Haru can stop him. At the same time, HEUSC informs Daisuke that he cannot tell him how to disarm the canister; despite being a Kambe product and that Daisuke doesn't have the necessary authority. Haru manages to save them, having realized the janitor had a secret spare key and had been using the panic room to hide his dirty magazines. Alvarez returns to Poliador while Nakamoto begins investigating the origins of the canister. Costs incurred in this episode: ¥ 317,000,000 (£ 2,272,633, US$ 2,974,082)
6	"Ill Got, Ill Spent"; Transliteration: "Akusen Mi ni Tsukazu" (Japanese: 悪銭身に付かず)	Shunsuke Ishikawa	August 20, 2020
Daisuke becomes suspicious of his lack of clearance to his own company. Nakamoto learns the Mizuo Company probably made the canister device and informs Kato he has investigated Mizuo before. They confront Imura, a Mizuo Executive, but are forced to leave when she starts recording them. Daisuke has HEUSC hack Imura's electric car, forcing her to speed so he could arrest her. HEUSC successfully hacks Imura's laptop during her interrogation, only to suddenly inform a shocked Daisuke he lacks the clearance to access specific folders due to their connection to the Kambe Group. Kato is approached by Takei and Hoshino, his former Division 1 boss and partner, respectively, who are suspicious of Kambe. Nakamoto locates incriminating evidence against Imura's son that Imura had covered up. Kato tries to talk to Daisuke but is advised to walk away or potentially lose his job. Nakamoto receives a similar warning from their boss, Kiyomizu, about losing his pension. Regardless, Nakamoto uses the evidence against Imura's son to force her to reveal how Mizuo is linked to the Kamb Group. Kato, unwilling to allow blackmail, has Imura released from custody. Unfortunately, her electric car is hacked again, causing the battery to explode, killing Imura instantly. Nakamoto accuses Daisuke of Imura's murder. Kato learns from Kiyomizu that the last time Nakamoto investigated Mizuo, it was due to the murder of Sayuri Kambe, Daisuke's mother. Costs incurred in this episode: ¥ 269,000,000 (£ 1,899,993, US$ 2,541,824)
7	"Money is the Root of All Evil"; Transliteration: "Kin wa Shoaku no Kongen" (Japanese: 金は諸悪の根源)	Yōsuke Yamamoto	August 27, 2020
Nakamoto and Takei investigated the potential murder of Sayuri Kambe by Shigemaru, Daisuke's father. Nakamoto received no help from the Kambe family and instead stole a photo album from which a witness identified Shigemaru as the murderer. Police Director Saiki, Takei's now deceased father-in-law, kept a close eye on the investigation. Nakamoto found a locker key in the album marked with the symbol for Adollium, a dangerous material Shigemaru had been researching. Takei located the locker while Nakamoto learned Shigemaru committed suicide, followed by the key being stolen from his desk. With Shigemaru dead and the key being stolen, the investigation was closed. Nakamoto plans to reopen the case, and Takei labels Daisuke a suspect for Imura's murder. Kato calls Daisuke, who admits he hacked Imura's car, angering Kato so much he smashes his car through Daisuke's front gate. Daisuke insists he is innocent and only interested in solving Sayuri's murder. Takei is gassed in his vehicle and experiences vivid hallucinations of Imura accusing him of her murder, fearing for his own life if he didn't sabotage the Sayuri investigation and tricking him into calling Director Saiki. He awakens in Daisuke's home, the hallucination having been created by an advanced virtual reality headset to trick him into revealing who he was afraid of during the Sayuri investigation, his own father-in-law Director Saiki. Costs incurred in this episode: ¥ 7,369,000,000 (£ 52,039,878, US$ 69,636,460)
8	"Money Burns a Hole in the Pocket"; Transliteration: "Yoigoshi no Zeni wa Motanu" (Japanese: 宵越しの銭は持たぬ)	Michiru Itabisashi; Kento Matsui	September 3, 2020
Daisuke explains that after Nakamoto accused him of Imura's murder, he managed to convince him he was only interested in Sayuri's murder. Nakamoto agrees to hold Takei in Daisuke's mansion while they find out what Adollium is. Nakamoto explains that he never discovered Shigemaru's lab's location, and now it no longer even exists in the Kambe Company's records. Daisuke interrogates his grandmother, but she refuses to talk. Nakamoto infers from Takei's fear that his father-in-law, Saiki, was murdered to cover something up. Takei has been afraid for his own life ever since. Suzue realizes HEUSC is actively hindering them by deleting information from the company servers. Kato discovers the lab in a Kambe owned mansion in the mountains, and Daisuke decides to infiltrate in secret. At the same time, Kato acts as a decoy outfitted with Suzue's military gadgets. An intruder enters Daisuke's house, trying to reach Takei, just as Daisuke had hoped, only for the intruder to begin bypassing security using passwords belonging to Shigemaru. HEUSC shuts down Suzue's supercomputer, and Takei begins to panic while Nakamoto appears unconcerned. Daisuke infiltrates the lab and finds security recordings proving Shigemaru is alive. Suzue confronts the intruder but is knocked out after seeing his face. Nakamoto also confronts the intruder, and Takei finally decides to confront him. Later Suzue wakes up to Kato and Daisuke and learns Nakamoto and Takei are dead. Costs incurred in this episode: ¥ 798,080,000 (£ 5,652,326, US$ 7,511,659)
9	"A Golden Key Can Open Any Door"; Transliteration: "Kogane no Kagi wa Don'na Tobira mo Akemasu" (Japanese: 黄金の鍵はどんな扉も開けます)	Aya Ikeda	September 10, 2020
Daisuke resigns. Katsuhiro reveals Nakamoto owned two dice that were a transmitter, and receiver, and he planted the transmitter on Shigemaru. Hoshino arrests Kato. The other members of Modern Crimes manage to avoid the First Division officer monitoring them and locating the transmitter signal while Suzue locates Shigemaru's car. Kato informs Hoshino of Shigemaru's survival, but Hoshino accuses Kato of murdering Takei for causing the incident that made him unable to fire his gun. Hoshino later finds Takei's resignation letter and realizes Kato is telling the truth. Daisuke locates Shigemaru's car and triggers a nerve gas trap, indicating someone planned to kidnap him. Suzue finds footage of Frantz Weinski, bodyguard to Thomas Matheson, an arms dealer, before HEUSC begins deleting the footage. Modern Crimes realize the transmitter is near Oura Wharf and inform Kato. Suzue emails everyone in the city, offering ¥100,000 to everyone who takes pictures of their surroundings and uses all the photos to locate Shigemaru at Oura Wharf. Kato illegally boards the container ship Shigemaru is on, closely followed by Daisuke in an advanced underwater combat suit. Daisuke fights Weinski. At the same time, Shigemaru activates an Adollium antenna that destroys Kato's phone and Daisuke's suit. Weinski destroys Daisuke's earring, cutting him off from Suzue, and starts beating him. Kato draws his gun to shoot Weinski but hesitates again. Costs incurred in this episode: ¥ 280,220,000,000 (£ 2,063,820,300, US$ 2,639,013,883)
10	"Life Shouldn't be Printed on Dollar Bills"; Transliteration: "Jinsei wa, Satsutaba ni Surikomu Yōna Mono Janai" (Japanese: 人生は、札束に刷り込むようなものじゃない)	Satoshi Saga; Tomohiko Itō	September 17, 2020
Kato drops a shipping container between Daisuke and Weinski, allowing them to escape. Weinski refuses to chase Daisuke because his only job is to get the ship to Poliador, so Shigemaru pays him ¥100,000,000 to teach him a lesson. Suzue scans the vessel and notices the engine is unusually small for such a large ship, so she sends drones after it, narrowly helping them avoid an ambush. Suzue explains that Adollium is somehow powering the ship with zero exhaust emissions. Daisuke heads for the engine while Kato tricks Weinski by pretending to have fallen overboard. Reaching the engine, Suzue theorizes that Adollium creates energy from seawater and could provide the world with unlimited supply of electricity or be turned into a weapon. Daisuke begins sabotaging the engine, but Weinski appears and stops him. Kato also arrives and tries to shoot Weinski but hesitates again until Daisuke encourages him to stop being a civil servant and be a detective. Kato finally shoots his gun, destroying the engine. Daisuke's suit reactivates, and he defeats Weinski. Daisuke starts to arrest Shigemaru for murdering Takei and Nakamoto. Resisting the arrest, Shigemaru orders HEUSC to incapacitate Daisuke with the ship's laser cannons. As Shigemaru escapes, Daisuke and Kato deliver Weinski and his men to Hoshino, who is happy to see Kato appears to have returned to his old self. Daisuke and Kato thoroughly destroy the ship to hide the Adollium before tracking Shigemaru to the mountains' lab. Costs incurred in this episode: ¥ 40,000,000,000 (£ 296,161,636, US$ 382,537,200)
11	"All That Glitters is Not Gold"; Transliteration: "Kagayaku Mono Subetekin ni Arazu" (Japanese: 輝くものすべて金にあらず)	Tomohiko Itō	September 24, 2020
Daisuke discovers the data on Adollium in the lab while Kato finds an underground train leading to Daisuke's mansion. Before confronting his father, whose real identity is his grandmother's butler, Hattori, who disguised himself as Shigemaru to deceive Daisuke, he hands the data to Suzue. Daisuke encounters his grandmother, Kikuko, who admits she wanted to keep Adollium as a family secret so they could profit from it. Daisuke's mother, Sayuri, wanted to broadcast Adollium's existence to the public, so Kikuko had Hattori assassinate her and, for years, has kept Shigemaru prisoner. Kato tried to catch Hattori, but the butler resisted; he then shot the policeman in the thigh. However, the wound is nothing comparable to the butler's severe injuries. The young police finally managed to catch Hattori, armed with the knowledge that the servant had orders not to kill Kato and the critical injuries he still suffered. Daisuke almost orders Suzue to release the data publicly but hesitates when Kikuko points out that Adollium could be used to create weapons of mass destruction. Kato, bleeding heavily, trips onto Suzue's computer and accidentally releases the data anyway. Amused at the result, Daisuke arrests Kikuko. Two weeks later, a recovering Kato refuses an offer to return to First Division, preferring Modern Crimes, while Daisuke helps Shigemaru begin recovering. Modern Crimes become much more efficient after Daisuke gives them HEUSC. Meanwhile, Adollium is now becoming public. It changes the world dramatically. It even starts appearing on the black market with Daisuke and Kato working to prevent its power abuse. Stopping another black market meeting, Kato again falls into the river as an amused Daisuke watches, just like the first time they met. Costs incurred in this episode: Unlimited.
