= Tomotaka Okamoto =

Tomotaka Okamoto may refer to:

- Tomotaka Okamoto (footballer), Japanese footballer
- Tomotaka Okamoto (singer), Japanese sopranist
