= Musica Piccolyno =

Japanese television series

- Original title: ムジカ・ピッコリーノ
- Genre: Educational; Musical; Adventure
- Directed by: Tomorou Uno (Season 1-2); Junpeii Ishihara (Season 3-10)
- Starring: Kenta Hamano; Arina Saito; Yasutomo Yamaguchi
- Narrated by: Lily Franky
- Country of origin: Japan
- Original language: Japanese

Production
- Producers: Kentaro Iwakiri (Season 1-2); Hiroya Ikebe (Season 3-5); Kensuke Shiga (Season 6-7); Satoshi Fujitsuka (Seasons 7-10)

Original release
- Network: NHK
- Release: 25 August 2012 - present

Musica Piccolyno (ムジカ・ピッコリーノ) is a Japanese television series broadcast by NHK. The pilot episode first aired on 25 August 2012, while the series proper began airing on 6 April 2013.

== Introduction ==
In this program, animation, CG and scientific experiments present diversified, original views of world music and various genres. It was intended to stimulate interest in music among children, and to nurture interest in art.

== Story ==
The show follows the adventures of four Musica Doctors, traveling inside the dimension known as Musica Mundo (ムジカ・ムンド), saving creatures known as Monstro (モンストロ), trying to restore their lost memories.

== Character ==
Mark Dottore (Kenta Hamano)
A Musica Doctor; he plays the trombone.
Arina (Saito Arina)
She is an apprentice Musica Doctor. She plays guitar.
Arvelt (Yasutomo Yamaguchi)
He is an apprentice Musica Doctor. He plays keyboard instruments such as piano.
Pepe (Sankon Jr.)
He is the engineer of the ship. He plays percussion and drums.
Narrator (Lily Franky)
