= Yukiko Okamoto =

Yukiko Okamoto may refer to:

- Yukiko Okamoto (actress) (岡元 夕紀子, born 1979), Japanese actress
- Yukiko Okamoto (runner) (岡本幸子, born 1974), Japanese female distance runner
