= Atsuko Asano (writer) =

Japanese writer (born 1954)

- Born: September 14, 1954 (age 71); Mimasaka-cho, Aida District (now Mimasaka city), Okayama Prefecture, Japan
- Education: Aoyama Gakuin University
- Occupations: Author, novelist
- Writing career
- Period: 1991–present
- Genres: Children's literature, period novel

Atsuko Asano (Japanese: あさの あつこ, Hepburn: Asano Atsuko; born 1954 in Okayama Prefecture) is a Japanese writer. She wrote the children's novel series Telepathy Shōjo Ran and the manga series The Manzai Comics. She started writing children's novels when she was in college. She graduated from Aoyama Gakuin University with the Bachelor of Letters degree. After that, she worked as a temporary teacher of the elementary school in Okayama for two years. She published Hotarukan monogatari as her first novel in 1991. She is married to a dentist and they have two sons and a daughter.

Asano received the Noma Prize for Juvenile Literature in 1997 for the book series Battery, which has been adapted into a film. The same series won the Shogakukan Children's Publication Culture Award in 2005. Her work frequently appears in literary magazines and she has also been featured in the Mainichi Shimbun.

She is a supporter of the Japanese Communist Party (JCP).

== Works ==
- "Kamigami no Utatane"
- "Girls Blue 2"
- "Girls Blue"
- "Yume Utsutsu"
- "The Manzai Comics #1–6"
- "Asano Kodomo no Omochabako"
- "Neko no Neko-san"
- "Telepathy Shōjo Ran"
- "Arifureta Fūkeiga"
- "Sasayaka na Monogatari-tachi"
- "Kimi ni Okuru Tsubasa Monogatari"
- "Matteru"
- "Last Inning"
- "Kaze no Yakata no Monogatari"
- "Ashita Fukukaze"
- "Shin Hotarukan Monogatari"
- "Hotarukan Monogatari"
- "Iede de Densha wa Ganbarimasu"
- "Miroku no Tsuki"
- "Erina no Aoi Sora"
- "Vivace"
- "Kimi ga Mitsukeru Monogatari"
- "Miyama Monogatari"
- "Fukushū Planner"
- "Konjiki no Nobe ni Utau"
- "Battery #1–7"
- "Field, wind"
- "Tabidachi"
- "Chūgakusei no Kimochi"
- "Iede Densha wa Koshōchu?"
- "Yōkai Henka"
- "Jūni no Uso to Jūni no Shinjitsu"
- "Yasha-zakura"
- "Jūni-sai Deai no Kisetsu"
- "Banka no Playball"
- "Runner"
- "Fukuin no Shōnen"
- "Sugu Kakeru Dokushō Kansōbun"
- "Nani yori mo Taisetsu na Koto"
- "Bokura no Shinrei Spotto"
- "Natsu-yasumi"
- "Chi ni Umorete"
- "Jikū Hunter Yuki"
- "Hint?"
- "Tōmei na Tabiji to"
- "Tanpopo Akichi no Tsukinowa"
- "Dobapyon"
- "Love Letter"
- "Mai wa Jussai desu"
- "No. 6"
