= Avu-chan =

Avu-chan アヴちゃん
- Also known as: Avu Barazono
- Born: December 25
- Origin: Hyōgo Prefecture, Japan
- Genres: Rock, punk, disco kayō
- Occupations: Singer, songwriter, producer, actor
- Years active: 2009–present
- Member of: Queen Bee, Gokumontō Ikka

Avu-chan (アヴちゃん; born December 25) is a Japanese singer, songwriter, producer and actor. They debuted as the lead vocalist and songwriter of the band Queen Bee in 2009, and took on a side project as the lead vocalist and trumpeter of the supergroup Gokumontō Ikka in 2015. As a producer and songwriter, Avu-chan uses the name Avu Barazono (薔薇園アヴ, Barazono Avu; "Avu Rose-Garden"), and has written songs for Meg, Rina Satō, Ai Shinozaki, Hey! Say! JUMP, LiSA, KERENMI, and the SUPERNOVA sub-unit Funky Galaxy. They also produce the alternative vocal-and-dance boy group Ryugujo, formed in 2023 through the audition program "0th Class 0 - Avu-chan's Classroom" (0年0組 -アヴちゃんの教室-).

== Biography ==
Expressing interest in music since middle school and inspired by the Japanese pop/electronic group Perfume, Avu-chan formed the band Queen Bee in 2009 with classmates in Kobe, Hyōgo Prefecture. They started performing at their school's cultural festivals and gained considerable popularity doing so, after which Queen Bee went on to perform at live houses in the Kansai region. The band made their first major concert appearance at the Fuji Rock Festival in July 2010, where they performed as a part of the very selective "Rookie a Go-Go" section, sometimes called the "road to success" for new artists. Having released their debut album Witch Hunt independently in March 2011, the band signed to Sony Music Associated Records, and in September of the same year released their second album Peacock. The band was called the "Japanese Hedwig" during their debut, as the gender identities of the members remain a secret. Not long after signing a contract with Sony Music, Queen Bee found early success with their song "Desco", which was featured in the romantic comedy film Moteki (2011), where the band had also made a cameo.

In 2013, Avu-chan had to pause all band activities, explaining the decision with burnout and technical inexperience. Unsure whether to return home or stay in Tokyo, Avu-chan decided to continue pursuing music after being encouraged by a staff member at Avu-chan's record label, who insisted that Queen Bee's signing was not a fluke. Around this time, Avu-chan asked an acquaintance, a former Blankey Jet City drummer Tatsuya Nakamura, if the two could create something together, to which he immediately agreed and introduced Avu-chan to bassist KenKen of the band Rize. After spending some time in the studio, the three were later joined by guitarist Ryosuke Nagaoka from Tokyo Jihen, whose presence Avu-chan described as "essential", as it gave a sense of unpredictability to the group. The newly formed supergroup, now known as Gokumontō Ikka, made their debut performance at the Rising Sun Rock Festival in August 2013. Only touring and releasing demos online at first, the band then released their first extended play Jitsuroku! Gokumontō Ikka during their November 2015 tour. During the hiatus, Avu-chan also collaborated with singer Mariko Gotō for Pretty Guardian Sailor Moon: The 20th Anniversary Memorial Tribute in 2014, performing a cover of "Ai no Senshi".

Queen Bee reformed in February 2014 after a one-year hiatus. The band's comeback single, "Venus", was used as the theme song for the drama Spooky Romantics (2015), which preceded their fourth album Kirei (2015). In the same year, Avu-chan collaborated with a South Korean boyband Supernova, writing and performing on the leading track "Jesus", from their sub-unit Funky Galaxy's debut extended play. In 2016, Queen Bee and Gokumontō Ikka released a split single, "Kinsei" / "Shibō Yūgi". The packaging for the limited edition of the split single was styled to resemble PlayStation fighting games, with the cover art illustrated by Kinu Nishimura, whose work on the Darkstalkers series has been considered a longtime favorite by Avu-chan.

In 2017, Avu-chan debuted as a stage actress with a production of The Rocky Horror Show, in the role of Columbia. The production toured Japan in late 2017.

Queen Bee's sixth album Ten (2019) was released to commemorate the band's ten-year anniversary, and was also their first album to ever reach the top 10 on the Oricon charts in Japan. It featured several tracks used as theme songs for anime, such as "Half" in Tokyo Ghoul:re, and "Fire" in Dororo. In 2019, Avu-chan returned to the stage, now in the role of Yitzhak in a Japanese production of Hedwig and the Angry Inch. In late 2020, Avu-chan produced the song "Ōkami Seinen" for an anonymous boyband called Honey Bee, who were later revealed to be Hey! Say! JUMP, and in 2021, collaborated with the singer LiSA on the song "GL", from her 10th anniversary mini-album Ladybug.

In 2022, Avu-chan starred in the Masaaki Yuasa-directed animated film Inu-Oh as the title character. In 2023, Avu-chan composed and wrote the lyrics for the song "8th Heaven" released by Shouta Aoi, which was used as the theme song to the live-action drama adaptation of One Room Angel. Avu-chan had been close friends with Harada, the creator of One Room Angel, and had written the song specifically for the series.

== Personal life ==
Like the other members of Queen Bee, Avu-chan's birth year, nationality, and gender have not been officially disclosed. Avu-chan identifies with gender aspects of both men and women. In school, Avu-chan related to characters who had non-traditional experiences of gender in films, such as Hedwig from Hedwig and the Angry Inch (2001) and the character of Angel in Rent (2005). Avu-chan does not like people who categorize others by gender and racial labels. Avu-chan's official website biography written in 2012 used she/her pronouns, as well as an article with MTV from 2015, however as of 2019 the biography was updated to no longer use pronouns. Often, Japanese language sources will use the Japanese pronoun kanojo (彼女) (the equivalent of she/her).

Avu-chan is of partial African-American descent and based the Queen Bee song "Half" (the ending theme song for the anime Tokyo Ghoul:re (2018)) on childhood experiences in Japan, when people questioned Avu-chan's ethnic background. As a child, Avu-chan wondered why people felt the need to ask about heritage and identity, and did not like the word hāfu (ハーフ, "half", the Japanese term for mixed race children), as Avu-chan did not feel like "half" of something.

Avu-chan's younger sister is former Queen Bee drummer Ruri-chan. Avu-chan identifies as a Buddhist.

== Discography ==
=== Queen Bee ===
- Witch Hunt (2011)
- Peacock (2011)
- Snake Princess (2012)
- Kirei (2015)
- Q (2017)
- Ten (2019)
- BL (2020)

=== Gokumontō Ikka ===
- Jitsuroku! Gokumontō Ikka (2015)

=== Guest appearances ===
List of non-single guest appearances with other performing artists
Title	Year	Other artist(s)	Album
"Oshiete Jesus" (教えてジーザス; "Tell Me, Jesus")	2012	DJ Baku	—N/a
"Ai no Senshi" (愛の戦士; "Guardian of Love")	2014	Mariko Gotō	Pretty Guardian Sailor Moon: The 20th Anniversary Memorial Tribute
"Jesus" (ジーザス, Jīzasu)	2015	Funky Galaxy from Choshinsei	Funky Galaxy
"Devilman no Uta" (デビルマンのうた; "Song of Devilman")	2018	Kensuke Ushio	Devilman Crybaby Original Soundtrack
"Dokugen" (独言)	2022	Otomo Yoshihide	Inu-Oh Original Soundtrack
"Udezuka" (腕塚)	2022	Otomo Yoshihide	Inu-Oh Original Soundtrack
"Kujira" (鯨)	2022	Otomo Yoshihide	Inu-Oh Original Soundtrack
"Ryū Chūjō" (竜中将)	2022	Mirai Moriyama, Otomo Yoshihide	Inu-Oh Original Soundtrack
"Stayin' Alive"	2022	—N/a	Bullet Train Original Motion Picture Soundtrack

=== Songwriting credits ===
Song	Year	Artist(s)	Album	Notes
"Kimi ga Tame" (君が為; "For You")	2013	Meg	Continue	Lyricist.
"Binetsu Annaijin" (微熱案内人; "Slightly Feverish Tour Guide")	2015	Ai Shinozaki	Eat 'Em and Smile	First appeared as an acoustic piano version as a B-side of Ai Shinozaki's "Again" single.
"Hi no Umi" (火の海; "Sea of Flame")	2015	Rei Hino (CV: Rina Satō)	Sailor Moon Crystal Character Song Collection: Crystal Collection	Lyricist. Queen Bee members perform on the song and composed the track.
"Ōkami Seinen" (狼青年; "Wolf Boy")	2020	Hey! Say! JUMP	Fab! Music Speaks	Queen Bee performs on the song.
"GL"	2021	LiSA	Ladybug	Queen Bee performs on the song.

== Bibliography ==
- Avu-chan (2020). Amphis Avuchan. E-Net Frontier Co., Ltd. ISBN 978-4862059369.

== Filmography ==
=== Film ===
Year	Title	Role
2011	Moteki	Self
2021	Inu-Oh	Inu-Oh (voice)

=== Television ===
Year	Title	Role	Notes
2015	Spooky Romantics	Villager	Episodes 11 and 12
2018	Devilman Crybaby	Xenon (voice)	Episode 8
2023	Ya Boy Kongming!	Maria Diesel	Episodes 1, 8, 10

=== Theater ===
Year	Title	Role	Notes
2017	The Rocky Horror Show	Columbia	November–December 2017 Parco Stage production
2019	Hedwig and the Angry Inch	Yitzhak	August–September 2019 TV Asahi/Nippon Broadcasting System production

=== Web ===
Year	Title	Role	Notes
2012	Das x Auris Buttocks Drive	Self	Toyota-sponsored video directed by Kensaku Kakimoto for the Daikanyama Art Street festival
