= List of Sailor Moon soundtracks =

Numerous people wrote and composed music for the Sailor Moon metaseries, with frequent lyrical contributions by creator Naoko Takeuchi. Takanori Arisawa, who earned the "Golden Disk Grand Prize" from Columbia Records for his work on the first series soundtrack in 1993, composed and arranged the background musical scores, including the spinoffs, games, and movies. In 1998, 2000, and 2001 he won the JASRAC International Award for most international royalties, owing largely to the popularity of Sailor Moon music in other nations. Over 40 Japanese music albums were released for the anime, many of which were remixes of the previous albums in jazz style, music box, French, etc. In addition, 33 different CD singles were released, many of them centered around specific characters.

== Sailor Moon soundtracks ==
=== Bishōjo Senshi Sailor Moon Ongaku Shuu ===
Bishōjo Senshi Sailor Moon Ongaku Shuu (美少女戦士セーラームーン音楽集, lit. Pretty Soldier Sailor Moon Music Collection) was released on May 1, 1992 as a CD and re-released on March 17, 2010 as a HQCD.

No.	Title	Music	Length
1.	"Moonlight Densetsu" (ムーンライト伝説, Moonlight Legend)	DALI	2:32
2.	"Atashi Datte Futsū no Onnanoko" (あたしだって普通の女の子, I'm Just An Ordinary Girl)		6:25
3.	"Hontōni Erabareta Senshi Nano?" (本当に選ばれた戦士なの?, They Really Chose Me to be a Soldier?)		6:39
4.	"Hoshizora ha Misuteriasu" (星空はミステリアス, The Mysterious Starlit Sky)		6:04
5.	"Occhokochoi ha Umaretsuki" (おっちょこちょいは生まれつき, Scatterbrained By Nature)		6:46
6.	"Koisuru Otomegokoro" (恋する乙女心, Falling in Love: A Girl's Feelings)		6:49
7.	"Darekaga Nerawareteiru" (誰かが狙われている, Stalking Someone)		7:15
8.	"Yumemiru Odango Atama" (夢見るおだんごアタマ, Dreamy Dumpling-head)		7:22
9.	"Yuugure Tokiha Youma no Yokan" (夕暮れ時は妖魔の予感, Evening Sense of Ghosts)		6:59
10.	"Moon Prism Power Make Up!" (ムーン・プリズム・パワー・メイクアップ!)		7:35
11.	"HEART MOVING"	Takamatsu Misae	3:36

=== Bishōjo Senshi Sailor Moon -Ai wa Dokoni Aruno?- ===
Bishōjo Senshi Sailor Moon -Ai wa Dokoni Aruno?- (美少女戦士セーラームーン ~愛はどこにあるの? ~, lit. Pretty Soldier Sailor Moon -Where is the Love?-) was released in 1992 as a CD and re-released in 2010 as a HQCD.

No.	Title	Length
1.	"Moonlight Densetsu" (ムーンライト伝説)	2:53
2.	"Ai Kotoba wa Moon Prism Power Make Up!" (合コトバはムーン・プリズム・パワー・メイクアップ！, The Word is, "Moon Prism Power Make Up!")	5:51
3.	"Princess Moon" (プリンセス・ムーン)	6:02
4.	"Hottokenai Yo" (ほっとけないよ, Don't Leave Me Alone)	6:08
5.	"Ai no Enaji o Ubae" (愛のエナジーを奪え, Steal the Energy of Love)	5:36
6.	"Tuxedo Night" (タキシード・ナイト)	5:41
7.	"Luna!" (ルナ！, Runa!)	5:35
8.	"Tsukini Kawatte Oshioki Yo!" (月にかわっておしおきよ, I'll Punish You in the Name of the Moon!)	5:30
9.	"Maboroshi no ginzuishō ~ Silver Crystal" (幻の銀水晶～シルバー・クリスタル, Phantom Silver Crystal ~ Silver Crystal)	5:49
10.	"Heart Moving"	3:36

=== Bishōjo Senshi Sailor Moon -in Another Dream- ===
Bishōjo Senshi Sailor Moon -in Another Dream- (美少女戦士セーラームーン -In Another Dream-, lit. Pretty Soldier Sailor Moon -in Another Dream-) was released in 2010 as a HQCD.

No.	Title	Length
1.	"Moonlight Densetsu" (ムーンライト伝説)	2:52
2.	"MONOLOGUE①～Usagi" (MONOLOGUE①～うさぎ)	1:30
3.	"Yumemiru dake ja dame" (夢見るだけじゃダメ, Why not just Dream)	5:09
4.	"MONOLOGUE②～Ami" (MONOLOGUE②～亜美)	1:39
5.	"Someday...Somebody..."	4:59
6.	"MONOLOGUE③～Rei～" (MONOLOGUE③～レイ～)	1:59
7.	"Eternal Melody" (永遠のメロディ)	4:12
8.	"MONOLOGUE④～Makoto" (MONOLOGUE④～まこと)	2:08
9.	"Anata no sei janai" (あなたのせいじゃない, Not Your Fault)	4:28
10.	"MONOLOGUE⑤～Minako" (MONOLOGUE⑤～美奈子)	1:35
11.	"Anata no yume o mita wa" (あなたの夢をみたわ, I Had a Dream of You)	4:31
12.	"MONOLOGUE⑥～Mamoru" (MONOLOGUE⑥～衛)	0:51
13.	"Toki o Koete..." (時を越えて..., Beyond Time...)	4:51
14.	"SHORT DRAMA: Princess Serenity & Endymion" (SHORT DRAMA～プリンセス・セレニティ&エンディミオン)	2:14
15.	"YOU'RE JUST MY LOVE"	4:14
16.	"Princess Moon" (プリンセス・ムーン)	4:01

=== Bishōjo Senshi Sailor Moon R Ongaku Shuu ===
Bishōjo Senshi Sailor Moon R Ongaku Shuu (美少女戦士セーラームーンR音楽集, lit.Pretty Soldier Sailor Moon R Music Collection) Released April 1, 1993 and was later re-released in 2010 as a HQCD.

This is the soundtrack for the second season. It contains the background music from the two parts of Sailor Moon R: the Alien arc (Ail+Ann or "Ann & Alan" in the dub) and the Black Moon/ChibiUsa arc which makes up the majority of Sailor Moon R. The two songs included on this CD are the opening and closing theme song for Sailor Moon R ("Otome no Policy") and "Suki to Itte", a song used as background in Sailor Moon R. Both are sung by ISHIDA Yoko, who also sang the popular Sailor Moon R/Sailor Moon S battle song "Ai no Senshi" (Soldier of Love).

No.	Title	Length
1.	"Otome no Policy" (乙女のポリシー, A Maiden's Policy)	3:13
2.	"Yūjō, Soshite Ai" (友情，そして愛; Friendship, and a Little Love)	6:15
3.	"Makaiju" (魔界樹, Hell Tree)	5:44
4.	"Watashi ga Tatakau" (私が戦う, I Fight)	6:00
5.	"Kiyoku, Akaruku, △×□§" (清く，明るく，△×□§...; Clean, Bright, △×□§...)	6:43
6.	"Aratanaru Teki" (新たなる敵, A New Enemy)	4:53
7.	"Tsuiseki ha Bouken no Hajimari" (追跡は冒険のはじまり, Tracking the Beginning of the Adventure)	4:54
8.	"Tsuki ha Miteiru" (月は見ている, The Moon is Watching)	5:03
9.	"Kanashimi wo Yuuki ni Kaete" (悲しみを勇気に変えて, Courage to End the Sorrow)	5:27
10.	"Suki to Itte" (好きと言って)	4:37

=== Bishoujo Senshi Sailor Moon R – Mirai he Mukatte ===
Bishojo Senshi Sailor Moon R -Mirai e Mukatte- (美少女戦士セーラームーンR -未来へ向かって-, lit. Pretty Soldier Sailor Moon R -Towards The Future-) was released in 2010 as a HQCD.

No.	Title	Length
1.	"Suki to Itte" (好きと言って, Say You Love Me)	4:37
2.	"I Am Sailor Moon" (I am セーラームーン)	5:28
3.	"Onaji Namida o Wakeatte" (同じ涙を分け合って, Shared the Same Tears)	5:10
4.	"Hijiri en ai ~Fire Soul Love~" (聖・炎・愛～Fire Soul Love～, Holy Flame Love – Fire Soul Love)	3:59
5.	"Otome no Policy" (乙女のポリシー, A Maiden's Policy)	3:13
6.	"Dakishimete Itai" (抱きしめていたい, I Want to Embrace)	4:42
7.	"STARLIGHT ni Kissu Shite" (STAR LIGHTにキスして, Kiss the Starlight)	4:27
8.	"Route Venus" (ルート・ヴィーナス)	4:30
9.	"Ai no Senshi" (愛の戦士, Soldier of Love)	3:36
10.	"Moonlight Densetsu" (ムーンライト伝説)	2:52

=== Bishojo Senshi Sailor Moon R – Gekijou Ban Music Collection -Ongaku Shu- ===
Soundtrack for Sailor Moon R: The Movie entitled Bishojo Senshi Sailor Moon R Gekijou Ban Music Collection -Ongaku Shu- (美少女戦士セーラームーンR-劇場版 MUSIC COLLECTION-音楽集-, lit. Pretty Soldier Sailor Moon – Movie Music Collection -Music Collection-) was released in 2010 as a HQCD.

No.	Title	Length
1.	"Prologue" (プロローグ)	1:32
2.	"Moon Revenge"	4:00
3.	"Akai-kami no Shōnen" (紅い髪の少年, Red-Haired Boys)	2:20
4.	"Shokubutsu-en no Happening! ~ Shinryaku no Yochō" (植物園のハプニング！～侵略の予兆, Happening in the Botanical Garden! ~ Signs of Aggression)	3:44
5.	"Yō-hana-ma Gurishina" (妖花魔グリシナ, Flower Monster Glycina)	3:00
6.	"Make Up!" (メイクアップ！)	3:13
7.	"Moeru Bishōjo Senshi" (燃える美少女戦士, Burn, Pretty Guardian)	2:32
8.	"Tuxedo Kamen tojo ~Mamoru to Fiore~" (タキシード仮面登場～衛とフィオレ～, Tuxedo Mask Appears ~Mamoru and Fiore~)	2:21
9.	"Sailor Teleport!" (セーラー・テレポート！)	1:55
10.	"Tsuisō no Fiore" (追想のフィオレ, Reminiscence of Fiore)	3:32
11.	"Hanameikyū no Shitō" (花迷宮の死闘, Deathmatch in the Flower Labyrinth)	2:14
12.	"Gekitotsu! Sailor Moon vs Fiore" (激突！セーラームーン vs フィオレ, Duel! Sailor Moon vs. Fiore)	4:43
13.	"Inochi Moyashite......" (生命燃やして......, Burning Life......)	3:09
14.	"Fukkatsu no Serenade <Moon Revenge>" (復活のセレナーデ＜Moon Revenge＞, The Serenade of Resurrection <Moon Revenge>)	1:32
15.	"I am Sailor Moon" (I am セーラームーン)	4:57

=== Bishojo Senshi Sailor Moon S Ongaku Shuu ===
Bishojo Senshi Sailor Moon S Ongaku Shuu (美少女戦士セーラームーンS音楽集, lit. Pretty Soldier Sailor Moon S Music Collection) was first released on June 1, 1994 and re-released on March 17, 2010 as a HQCD.

The soundtrack for third season includes all the Sailor Moon S make-up and attack music and the Outer Senshi make-up, appearance and attack music. Not included are the opening theme (the second version of "Moonlight Densetsu", performed by Moon Lips) and the ending theme Tuxedo Mirage.

No.	Title	Length
1.	"Seihai, Messiah ... Shinpi naru Sekai" (聖杯、救世主...神秘なる世界; Holy Grail, Messiah...The Mystic World)	1:58
2.	"Subtitle" (サブタイトル)	0:10
3.	"Asa no Namikidou" (朝の並木道, A Morning in the Tree-Lined Street)	4:08
4.	"Death Busters no Yabou" (デスバスターズの野望, Death Busters' Ambitions)	3:15
5.	"Tenō Haruka to Kaiō Michiru" (天王はるかと海王みちる, Haruka Tenou and Michiru Kaiou)	2:25
6.	"Koisuru Otome ha Tomaranai!" (恋する乙女はとまらない！, Girls in Love Won't Stop!)	5:00
7.	"Daimōn Shutsugen" (ダイモーン出現, Daimon Appearance)	4:38
8.	"Eye Catch" (アイキャッチ)	0:12
9.	"Ubawareta Junsuina kokoro no kesshō" (奪われた純粋な心の結晶, The Pure Heart Crystal is Stolen)	3:09
10.	"Senshi no Shukumei..." (戦士の宿命..., Soldier's Fate...)	4:39
11.	"Henshin! Sailor Senshi" (変身！セーラー戦士, Transform! Sailor Soldiers)	4:28
12.	"Uranus, Soshite, Neptune" (ウラヌス、そして、ネプチューン, Uranus and Neptune)	5:38
13.	"The Pretty Soldiers' Big War!"	4:20
14.	"Ai no Kiseki" (愛の奇跡, Miracle of Love)	2:04
15.	"Raishū mo mite ne!" (来週も見てネ！, See You Next Week!)	0:31

=== Bishojo Senshi Sailor Moon SuperS Ongaku Shuu ===
Bishojo Senshi Sailor Moon SuperS Ongaku Shuu (美少女戦士セーラームーンSuperS音楽集, lit. Pretty Soldier Sailor Moon SuperS Music Collection) was first released on September 21, 1995, and re-released on March 17, 2010 as a HQCD.

This is the soundtrack for the fourth season of Sailor Moon. The musical cues from SuperS also appear on Music Box Disc 5, rearranged somewhat differently from this CD. Nehellenia's theme music is located on the Sailor Moon S Movie Music Collection: it is the same as Princess Snow Kaguya's theme music.

No.	Title	Length
1.	"Moonlight Densetsu" (ムーンライト伝説)	2:32
2.	"Subtitle" (サブタイトル)	0:08
3.	"Yume de Mita Hyoushou no Mori" (夢で見た水晶の森, Dreaming of the Crystal Forest)	4:37
4.	"Sailor Senshi no Yūga na Houkagō" (セーラー戦士の優雅な放課後, Graceful Sailor Soldiers After School)	5:36
5.	"Otona-tachi no Yuutsu" (大人達の憂鬱, The Melancholy of Adults)	4:10
6.	"Kaijin-tachi no Circus dan" (怪人達のサーカス団, The Circus Troupe of Mysterious People)	5:12
7.	"Amazon BAR" (アマゾンBAR)	3:29
8.	"ChibiUsa no Romance" (ちびうさのロマンス, Chibiusa's Romance)	3:03
9.	"Eyecatch" (アイキャッチ)	0:11
10.	"Amazon Trio no Wana" (アマゾントリオの罠, Traps of the Amazon Trio)	4:49
11.	"Utsukushii Yume no Kagami" (美しい夢の鏡, Beautiful Dream Mirror)	4:35
12.	"Sailor Senshi Aratanaru Hishou" (セーラー戦士新たなる飛翔, New Flight of the Sailor Soldiers)	5:25
13.	"Double Henshin! Moon & Chibi-Moon" (ダブル変身！ ムーン&ちびムーン)	2:22
14.	"Moon Gorgeous Meditation!" (ムーンゴージャスメディテイション！)	3:15
15.	"Itsuka, Sonna "Watashi-tachi" ni Naritakute" (いつか，そんな"私たち"になりたい; Someday, I Want To Be Together With You)	3:45
16.	"Sore jā, Mata Raishū ne" (それじゃあ，また来週ネ; This Is It, See You Next Week)	0:30
17.	"'Rashiku' Ikimasho" ("らしく"いきましょ)	3:31

=== Bishojo Senshi Sailor Moon Sailor Stars Music Collection ===
Bishojo Senshi Sailor Moon Sailor Stars Music Collection (美少女戦士セーラームーンセーラースターズMUSIC COLLECTION, lit. Pretty Soldier Sailor Moon Sailor Stars Music Collection) was first released on July 20, 1996 and re-released on March 17, 2010 as a HQCD.

This soundtrack features the background music from the Nehellenia portion of Sailor Stars and the opening & closing theme songs. The slower version of the ending theme Kaze mo Sora mo Kitto... which aired during the first few episodes of Sailor Stars was never released on CD.

No.	Title	Length
1.	"Eternal Sailor Moon" (エターナルセーラームーン)	1:51
2.	"Sailor Star Song" (セーラースターソング)	3:51
3.	"Subtitle" (サブタイトル)	2:08
4.	"5-nin wa koukousei" (5人は高校生, 5 Senior High School Students)	3:18
5.	"Nehellenia Fukkatsu" (ネヘレニア復活, Nehellenia's Resurrection)	4:20
6.	"Hotaru no Kanegoto" (ほたるの予言, Hotaru's Prediction)	1:40
7.	"Eyecatch" (アイキャッチ)	0:11
8.	"Mirror Palais Dolly" (ミラーパレドリー, Mirror Parhedroi)	4:56
9.	"Toraware no Sailor Senshi" (とらわれのセーラー戦士, Captured Sailor Soldiers)	2:09
10.	"Princess no tameni......" (プリンセスのために......, For the Sake of the Princess......)	6:42
11.	"Eternal no Ai" (エターナルの愛, Eternal Love)	3:19
12.	"Three Lights" (スリーライツ)	3:51
13.	"Shadow Galactica" (シャドウギャラクティカ)	3:58
14.	"Moon Eternal Make Up!" (ムーンエターナルメイクアップ！)	1:55
15.	"Sailor Starlights Shutsugen" (セーラースターライツ出現, Sailor Starlights Arrival)	1:05
16.	"Kaze mo Sora mo Kitto..." (風も空もきっと..., Surely the Sky the Wind)	4:43
17.	"Tsukino Hikari wa Ai no Message" (月の光は愛のメッセージ, Moonlight Message of Love)	0:27

=== Bishōjo Senshi Sailor Moon Sailor Stars Music Collection Vol.2 ===
Bishōjo Senshi Sailor Moon Sailor Stars Music Collection Vol.2 (美少女戦士セーラームーンセーラースターズMUSIC COLLECTION Vol.2, lit. Pretty Soldier Sailor Moon Sailor Stars Music Collection Vol.2) was released on March 17, 2010 as an HQCD.

This soundtrack features BGM from the Three Lights portion of Sailor Stars. Most of the tracks on this album are duplicated on Memorial Music Box Disc 7. Track 15 Kyuukyoku no Ai ("Ultimate Love") is borrowed from Johann Sebastian Bach's "Prelude in C Major". The track is also included on Memorial Music Box Disc 7 – Track 22.

No.	Title	Length
1.	"Mamoru tono wakare, soshite......" (衛との別れ、そして......; Then, Parting with Mamoru......)	4:07
2.	"Bokutachi no Uta wo Kite" (ボクたちの歌をきいて, Listen to Our Song)	3:50
3.	"Ano kata ha Dokoni......" (あの方はどこに......, Where is that Person......)	3:33
4.	"Seiya, Taiki, Yaten" (星野、大気、夜天)	3:50
5.	"Guitar Solo Collection" (ギターソロ・コレクション)	3:47
6.	"Gakuen no Idol" (学園のアイドル, School Idol)	1:09
7.	"Minako no Yabō" (美奈子の野望, Minako's Ambition)	1:59
8.	"Ginga Terebide no Sakuryaku" (銀河テレビでの策略, Strategy in the TV Galaxy)	2:18
9.	"Starseed o Itadakuwa" (スターシードをいただくわ, I'll take the Star Seed)	2:23
10.	"Osoi kuru Phage" (襲い来るファージ, Phage comes attacking)	2:57
11.	"Star Power Make-Up!" (スターパワーメイクアップ！)	1:55
12.	"Karei naru Eternal Sailor Moon" (華麗なるエターナルセーラームーン, Magnificent Eternal Sailor Moon)	2:52
13.	"Kyūkyoku no Aku" (究極の悪, Ultimate Evil)	1:12
14.	"Ketsui" (決意, Determination)	1:16
15.	"Kyūkyoku no Ai" (究極の愛, Ultimate Love)	2:22
16.	"Heiwa" (平和, Peace)	2:02
17.	"Kyōkara Mata Futsū no Koukousei" (今日からまたフツーの高校生, After Today, Normal High School Students Again)	1:14

Bonus Tracks

No.	Title	Length
18.	"Star Power Make-Up! -kourasu nashi-" (スターパワーメイクアップ音楽～コーラスなし～, Star Power Make-Up! -without chorus-)	1:55
19.	"Moon Eternal Make-Up! -kourasu nashi-" (ムーンエターナルメイクアップ音楽～コーラスなし～, Moon Eternal Make-Up! -without Chorus-)	0:38
20.	"Eternal Sailor Moon Action -kourasu nashi-" (エターナルセーラームーン・アクション音楽～コーラスなし～, Eternal Sailor Moon Action -without chorus-)
21.	"Yokokuhen Ongaku ~15 Byou Bajon~" (予告編音楽～15秒ヴァージョン～, Foretelling Chapter Music -15 Second Version-)	0:15

=== Pretty Guardian Sailor Moon: The 20th Anniversary Memorial Tribute ===
Pretty Guardian Sailor Moon: The 20th Anniversary Memorial Tribute (美少女戦士セーラームーン THE 20TH ANNIVERSARY MEMORIAL TRIBUTE) was released on March 17, 2010 as an HQCD.

No.	Title	Artist	Length
1.	"Moonlight Densetsu" (ムーンライト伝説; Moonlight Legend)	Momoiro Clover Z	2:53
2.	"Heart Moving"	Shoko Nakagawa	3:41
3.	"Princess Moon" (プリンセス・ムーン)	Haruka Fukuhara	4:11
4.	"Otome no Policy" (乙女のポリシー; Maiden's Policy)	Etsuko Yakushimaru	4:24
5.	"La Soldier" (ラ・ソウルジャー)	Tommy Heavenly6	4:43
6.	"Ai no Senshi" (愛の戦士; Soldier of Love)	Mariko Gotō x Avu-chan (Queen Bee)	3:49
7.	"Tuxedo Mirage" (タキシードミラージュ)	Momoiro Clover Z	3:36
8.	""Rashiku" Ikimasho" ("らしく"いきましょ; I'll Go as "Myself")	Haruko Momoi	3:36
9.	"Sailor Star Song" (セーラースターソング)	Mitsuko Horie	3:56
10.	"Kaze mo Sora mo Kitto..." (風も空もきっと...; The Wind, the Sky, Surely...)	Makoto Kawamoto	6:10

Bonus Tracks

No.	Title	Artist	Length
11.	"Moonlight Densetsu (FrenchVer.)" (ムーンライト伝説(仏語Ver.); Moonlight Legend (French Ver.))	Clémentine	3:20

=== Pretty Guardian Sailor Moon: The 25th Anniversary Memorial Tribute ===
Pretty Guardian Sailor Moon: The 25th Anniversary Memorial Tribute (美少女戦士セーラームーン THE 25TH ANNIVERSARY MEMORIAL TRIBUTE) was released on April 4, 2018 as an HQCD.

No.	Title	Artist	Length
1.	"Moonlight Densetsu" (ムーンライト伝説; Moonlight Legend)	Lisa	2:53
2.	"La Soldier" (ラ・ソウルジャー)	Gesshoku Kaigi	4:43
3.	"Moon Revenge" (プリンセス・ムーン)	BiSH	3:01
4.	"Otome no Policy" (乙女のポリシー; Maiden's Policy)	Yoko Ishida	4:24
5.	"Kakumei wa Night & Day" (ラ・ソウルジャー; Revolution is Night & Day)	Etsuko Yakushimaru	3:57
6.	""Rashiku" Ikimashou" (らしく"いきましょ; I'll Go As Myself)	Sonoko Inoue	3:49
7.	"Kaze mo Sora mo Kitto..." (風も空もきっと...; The Wind, the Sky, Surely...)	Gesshoku Kaigi	3:36
8.	"Sailor Star Song" (セーラースターソング)	Silent Siren	3:56
9.	"Eternal Eternity"	Ziyoou-vachi	4:38

Bonus Tracks

No.	Title	Artist	Length
1.	"Moonlight Densetsu" (ムーンライト伝説 Bonus Track)	Kotono Mitsuishi, Hisako Kanemoto, Rina Satō, Ami Koshimizu and Shizuka Itō (as Crystal Sailor5Guardians)	3:19
2.	"Tuxedo Mirage" (タキシード・ミラージュ Bonus Track)	Kotono Mitsuishi, Hisako Kanemoto, Rina Satō, Ami Koshimizu and Shizuka Itō (as Crystal Sailor5Guardians)	3:23

=== English-language soundtracks ===
This is a list of English-language soundtracks from the DiC dubbed anime series. Three albums were released from 1996–2002.

==== Sailor Moon – Songs from the Hit TV Series ====
Sailor Moon – Songs from the Hit TV Series

Soundtrack album by Various Artists
- Released: February 27, 1996
- Recorded: 1995
- Genre: Soundtrack
- Length: 29:13
- Labels: DIC Tune-Time Audio, Kid Rhino

Fred Patten highlighted "Oh Starry Night" and "Rainy Day Man" as being the best on the soundtrack, but felt that "She's Got the Power" was not specific enough to Sailor Moon.

No.	Title	Writer(s)	Artist	Length
1.	"Sailor Moon Theme"	Tetsuya Komoro (music), Bob Summers (arrangement), Andy Heyward (lyrics)	Nicole & Brynne Price	1:35
2.	"I Wanna Be a Star!"	Michael Benghiat, John Miyagi Author, Andy Heyward	Jennifer Cihi (Serena), Sandy Howell (Background vocals, Raye)	3:24
3.	"My Only Love"	Michael Benghiat, John Miyagi Author, Andy Heyward	Jennifer Cihi (Serena)	3:09
4.	"Call My Name (I'll Be There)"	Michael Benghiat, John Miyagi Author, Andy Heyward, Sandy Howell	Jennifer Cihi (Serena), Sandy Howell (Background vocals, Raye)	2:57
5.	"Oh Starry Night"	Michael Benghiat, John Miyagi Author, Andy Heyward	Sandy Howell (Raye)	3:17
6.	"It's a New Day"	Michael Benghiat, Lois Blaisch, Andy Heyward	Jennifer Cihi (Serena)	2:50
7.	"Carry On"	Michael Benghiat, John Miyagi Author, Andy Heyward	Jennifer Cihi (Serena)	2:11
8.	"Rainy Day Man"	Michael Benghiat, Lois Blaisch, Andy Heyward	Patricia Tollett (Lita)	3:09
9.	"Only a Memory Away"	Michael Benghiat, Lois Blaisch, Andy Heyward	Shandi Sinnamon (Amy)	3:12
10.	"She's Got the Power"	Michael Benghiat, Matt McGuire, Andy Heyward	Stan Bush	2:58
11.	"Sailor Moon Theme (Reprise)"	Andy Heyward	Nicole & Brynne Price	0:32

==== Sailor Moon & The Scouts – Lunarock ====
Sailor Moon & The Scouts – Lunarock

Soundtrack album by Various Artists
- Released: June 15, 1999
- Recorded: 1992, 1993, 1999
- Genre: Soundtrack
- Length: 28:03
- Labels: DIC Tune-Time Audio, Kid Rhino

No.	Title	Writer(s)	Artist	Length
1.	"The Power of Love"	Michael Benghiat, John Miyagi Author, Evan Roberts	Jennifer Cihi (Serena)	3:05
2.	"I Want Someone to Love"	Ron Wasserman, Evan Roberts	Jennifer Cihi (Serena), Patricia Tollett (Lita), Sandy Howell (Raye), Ron Wasserman (Darien)	4:24
3.	"I Want to Hold Your Hand"	Lennon–McCartney	Jennifer Cihi (Serena)	3:39
4.	"Who Do You Think You Are?"	Michael Benghiat, Sandy Howell, Evan Roberts	Jennifer Cihi (Serena), Sandy Howell (Raye)	4:27
5.	"Moonlight Densetsu / Moonlight Legends"	Tetsuya Komoro (music), Kanako Oda (lyrics)	Dali	2:54
6.	"Daddy's Girl"	Michael Benghiat, Billy Martin, Evan Roberts	Patricia Tollett (Lita)	3:38
7.	"Ai no Senshi / Soldier of Love"	Nobuhiko Kashihara (music/arrangement), Rui Serizawa (lyrics)	Yoko Ishida	3:38
8.	"Nothing at All"	Sandy Howell, Matt McGuire, Evan Roberts	Sandy Howell (Raye)	2:17

==== Sailor Moon – The Full Moon Collection ====
Sailor Moon – The Full Moon Collection

Soundtrack album by Various Artists
- Released: November 12, 2002
- Recorded: 1995–1999
- Genre: Soundtrack
- Length: 52:19
- Labels: DIC Tune-Time Audio, Koch Records

All music is composed by Bob Summers, except as noted.

No.	Title	Writer(s)	Artist	Length
1.	"Pan Flute"			0:33
2.	"Sailor Moon Theme (S.A.F. Remix)"	Tetsuya Komoro (music), Bob Summers (arrangement), Monroe Michaels^{*} (lyrics)	Nicole & Brynne Price	3:15
3.	"I'm Not Ready"	Ron Wasserman, Melanie Anne	Sandy Howell (Raye), Ron Wasserman (Darien)	3:49
4.	"My Only Love (Remix)"	Michael Benghiat, John Miyagi Author, Monroe Michaels^{*}	Jennifer Cihi (Serena), Sandy Howell (Raye)	3:39
5.	"I Want Someone to Love (RAWmix)"	Ron Wasserman, Evan Roberts	Jennifer Cihi (Serena), Patricia Tollett (Lita), Sandy Howell (Raye)	5:19
6.	"I Want to Hold Your Hand (Hi-NRG Mix)"	Lennon–McCartney	Jennifer Cihi (Serena)	5:09
7.	"Moon Crystal Power"			0:45
8.	"Call My Name (I'll Be There)"	Michael Benghiat, John Miyagi Author, Sandy Howell, Andy Heyward	Jennifer Cihi (Serena)	2:58
9.	"Tiara Action"			0:45
10.	"I Wanna Be a Star!"	Michael Benghiat, John Miyagi Author, Andy Heyward	Jennifer Cihi (Serena), Sandy Howell (Raye)	3:26
11.	"Receiving Waves, Part 3"			0:52
12.	"The Power of Love"	Michael Benghiat, John Miyagi Author, Evan Roberts	Jennifer Cihi (Serena)	3:07
13.	"Tuxedo Mask"			0:11
14.	"Rainy Day Man"	Michael Benghiat, Lois Blaisch, Andy Heyward	Patricia Tollett (Lita)	3:13
15.	"Luna"			0:25
16.	"Nothing at All"	Sandy Howell, Matt McGuire, Evan Roberts	Sandy Howell (Raye)	2:22
17.	"Sailor Jupiter"			0:57
18.	"It's a New Day"	Michael Benghiat, Lois Blaisch, Andy Heyward	Jennifer Cihi (Serena)	2:52
19.	"Melvin"			0:50
20.	"Sailor Moon Theme (S.A.F. Club Mix)"	Tetsuya Komoro (music), Bob Summers (arrangement), Monroe Michaels^{*} (lyrics)	Nicole & Brynne Price	6:48
21.	"Queen Beryl"			1:01

^{*} Monroe Michaels is thought to be the pseudonym of Andy Heyward.

== Sailor Moon Crystal soundtracks ==
=== Sailor Moon Crystal Season I & II ===
==== Sailor Moon Edition (CD+Blu-ray) ====
CD
No.	Title	Lyrics	Music	Length
1.	"Moon Pride" (MOON PRIDE)	Revo	Revo	3:43
2.	"Gekkō" (月虹, "Moonbow")	Sumire Shirobara	Akiko Kosaka	4:22
3.	"Moon Pride" (off vocal ver.)		Revo	3:43
4.	"Gekkō" (off vocal ver.)		Kosaka	4:22
Total length:				16:10

Blu-ray Disc
No.	Title	Lyrics	Music	Length
1.	"Moon Pride" (music video)	Revo	Revo

==== Momoiro Clover Z Edition (CD only) ====
CD
No.	Title	Lyrics	Music	Length
1.	"Moon Pride"	Revo	Revo	3:43
2.	"Gekkō (月虹, Moonbow)"	Sumire Shirobara	Akiko Kosaka	4:22
3.	"Moon Revenge"	Kayoko Fuyumori	Kosaka, Yukari Hashimoto	4:26
4.	"Moon Pride" (off vocal ver.)		Revo	3:43
5.	"Gekkō (月虹, Moonbow)" (off vocal ver.)		Kosaka	4:22
6.	"Moon Revenge" (off vocal ver.)		Kosaka	4:26
Total length:				25:02

==== Sailor Moon Crystal Original Soundtracks ====
All tracks are written by Yasuharu Takanashi, except where noted.

Disc 1
No.	Title	Lyrics	Music	Length
1.	"Legend of the Moon (月の伝説, Tsuki no densetsu)"			3:29
2.	"Moon Prism Power Make Up! (ムーン・プリズム・パワー・メイクアップ!, Mūn purizumu pawā meiku appu!)"			1:25
3.	"Star Power Make Up! (スター・パワー・メイクアップ!, Sutā pawā meiku appu!)"			1:08
4.	"In the Name of the Moon, I'll Punish You! (月にかわっておしおきよ!, Tsuki ni kawatte oshioki yo!)"			1:48
5.	"MOON PRIDE (TV Size)" (performed by Momoiro Clover Z)	Revo	Revo	1:33
6.	"Tuxedo Mask (タキシード仮面, Takishīdo kamen)"			2:00
7.	"Mamoru's Theme (衛のテーマ, Mamoru no tēma)"			1:57
8.	"Shadows Lurking in the Darkness (闇にひそむ影, Yami ni hisomu kage)"			1:42
9.	"The Beginning of Strange Occurrences (怪異の始まり, Kaī no hajimari)"			1:47
10.	"Sailor Moon's Theme (セーラームーンのテーマ, Sērā mūn no tēma)"			1:30
11.	"Sailor Mercury's Theme (セーラーマーキュリーのテーマ, Sērā mākyurī no tēma)"			1:34
12.	"Sailor Mars's Theme (セーラーマーズのテーマ, Sērā māzu no tēma)"			2:11
13.	"Sailor Jupiter's Theme (セーラージュピターのテーマ, Sērā jupitā no tēma)"			1:33
14.	"Sailor Venus's Theme (セーラーヴィーナスのテーマ, Sērā vīnasu no tēma)"			1:32
15.	"In the Bright Sunlight (明るい陽射しの中で, Akarui hizashi no naka de)"			1:42
16.	"Awakening Hasn't Happened Yet (目ざめはまだ訪れず, Mezame wa mada otozurezu)"			1:43
17.	"I'm Clumsy, but that's OK! (おっちょこちょいだけどいいじゃない, Otchokochoidakedo ī janai)"			1:27
18.	"Everyday Is a Wonderland (毎日がワンダーランド, Mainichi ga wandārando)"			1:24
19.	"The Mask of Darkness (闇の仮面, Yami no kamen)"			1:33
20.	"A Conflicted Heart (葛藤する心, Kattō suru kokoro)"			1:56
21.	"The Deep Abyss of Sorrow (悲しみの深き淵, Kanashimi jo fukaki fuchi)"			2:02
22.	"Love Happens Again (愛はふたたび, Ai wa futatabi)"			2:17
23.	"Shock (衝撃, Shōgeki)"			0:34
24.	"Attack of Darkness (闇の襲撃, Yami ko shūgeki)"			1:54
25.	"Moon Healing Escalation! (ムーン・ヒーリング・エスカレーション!, Mūn hīringu esukarēshon!)"			1:10
26.	"Sailor Guardians of Love and Justice (愛と正義のセーラー戦士, Ai to seigi no sērā senshi)"			1:37
27.	"Ties with Loved Ones (愛するものとの絆, Aisuru monoto no kizuna)"			2:00
28.	"Irreplaceable Friendship (かけがえのない友情, Kakegae no nai yūjō)"			1:45
29.	"Moments of Peace (ひとときの平安, Hitotoki no heian)"			1:38
30.	"Sailor V game (セーラーVゲーム, Sērā V gēmu)"			2:02

Disc 2
No.	Title	Lyrics	Music	Length
1.	"Usagi's Theme (うさぎのテーマ, Usagi no tēma)"			1:43
2.	"Ami's Theme (亜美のテーマ, Ami no tēma)"			1:39
3.	"Rei's Theme (レイのテーマ, Rei no tēma)"			1:55
4.	"Makoto's Theme (まことのテーマ, Makoto no tēma)"			1:30
5.	"Minako's Theme (美奈子のテーマ, Minako no tēma)"			1:26
6.	"Chibiusa's Theme (ちびうさのテーマ, Chibiusa no tēma)"			2:14
7.	"Dazzling World (まぶしい世界, Mabushī sekai)"			1:33
8.	"A Dreamy Waltz (夢見心地のワルツ, Yumemigokochi no warutsu)"			1:39
9.	"Darkness from Eternity (闇はとこしえより, Yami wa tokoshie yori)"			2:25
10.	"Anxiety and Impatience (不安と焦燥, Fuan to shōsō)"			1:55
11.	"Tragic Battle (悲壮な戦い, Hisō no tatakai)"			1:51
12.	"Black Lady (ブラック・レディ, Burakku reidi)"			1:58
13.	"Quiet Sorrow (静かなる哀しみ, Shizuka naru kanashimi)"			2:23
14.	"Anger Unleashed (解き放たれた怒り, Toki hanatareta ikari)"			2:30
15.	"Door of Time (時の扉, Toki no tobira)"			1:39
16.	"Sailor Chibi Moon's Theme (セーラーちびムーンのテーマ, Sērā chibi mūn no tēma)"			1:47
17.	"Omen of Catastrophe (破局の前兆, Hakyoku no zenchō)"			1:50
18.	"A Prayer to the Moon (月に祈りを, Tsuki ko inori wo)"			2:09
19.	"A Determined Heart (決意を胸に, Ketsui ō mune ni)"			1:52
20.	"The Final Battle (最後の戦い, Saigo no tatakai)"			3:16
21.	"Love Theme (愛のテーマ, Ai no tēma)"			2:28
22.	"Like a Soft Breeze (さわやかな風のように, Sawayakana kaze no yōni)"			2:11
23.	"A Story That Will Continue into Tomorrow (明日に続く物語, Ashita ni tsudzuku monogatari)"			1:41
24.	"Moonbow (TV Size) (月虹 (TVサイズ), Gekkō (TV Saizu))" (performed by Momoiro Clover Z)	Sumire Shirobara	Akiko Kosaka	1:30

==== Sailor Moon Crystal Character Song Collection: Crystal Collection ====
No.	Title	Writer(s)	Artist	Length
1.	"Whether it Rains or Shines -Come Rain or Come Shine- (降っても 晴れても -come rain or come shine-, Futtemo Haretemo -come rain or come shine-)"	Rui Nagai (composer & arrangement), Sumire Shirobara (lyrics)	Kotono Mitsuishi (as Usagi)	5:00
2.	"A Touch of Rain"	Jimanica (composer & arrangement), Shoko Fujibayashi (lyrics)	Hisako Kanemoto (as Ami)	4:42
3.	"Sea of Fire (火の海, Hino Umi)"	薔薇園 アヴ (Avu Barazono)(composer & arrangement), Joō Baachi (lyrics)	Rina Satō (as Rei)	4:00
4.	"Cherry Pie"	Shinya Saitō (composer & arrangement), Meg Rock (Lyrics)	Ami Koshimizu (as Makoto)	5:00
5.	"Because My Heart is Empty, Flying Will Do ((ハート)が飛んじゃう空だから, (heart) ga Tonjyau Sora Dakara)"	Yoshimasa Inoue (composer & lyrics), Aki Hata (lyrics)	Shizuka Itō (as Minako)	4:07
6.	"Moonrise in Your Eyes (君の瞳のMoonrise, Kimi no hitomi no Moonrise)"	Toshiyuki Omori (composer & arrangement), Saori Kodama (lyrics)	Kenji Nojima (as Mamoru)	4:30
7.	"I'm Going Down"	TeddyLoid (composer & arrangement), Yuho Iwasato (lyrics)	Daisuke Kishio (as Jadeite), Kosuke Toriumi (as Nephrite), Masaya Matsukaze (as Zoisite), Eiji Takemoto (as Kunzite)	4:05
8.	"Midnight Secret Talk (真夜中secret talk, Mayonaka no Secret Talk)"	Kaoru Okubo (composer & arrangement), Akiko Watanabe (lyrics)	Hisako Kanemoto & Ami Koshimizu (as Ami & Makoto)	4:17
9.	"Star on Stars"	Akiko Kosaka (lyrics, composer & arrangement)	Rina Satō & Shizuka Itō (as Rei and Minako)	4:17
10.	"Revolutionary Night and Day (革命はナイト&デイ, Kakumei wa Night and Day)"	Tika α (lyrics, composer & arrangement)	Kotono Mitsuishi (as Sailor Moon), Hisako Kanemoto (as Sailor Mercury), Rina Sato (as Sailor Mars), Ami Koshimizu (as Sailor Jupiter), Shizuka Ito (as Sailor Venus)	3:55

=== Sailor Moon Crystal Season III ===
==== New Moon ni Koishite/Eternal Eternity ====
Disc 1
No.	Title	Artist	Length
1.	"Fall in Love with the New Moon (ニュームーンに恋して, Nyū mūn ni koishite)" (Tika α (lyrics, composer & arrangement))	Performed by Etsuko Yakushimaru	4:24
2.	"eternal eternity" (Shinya Saito (composer & arrangement), Meg Rock (lyrics))	Performed by Junko Minagawa (Sailor Uranus) & Sayaka Ohara (Sailor Neptune)	4:17
3.	"Fall in Love with the New Moon (off vocal ver.) (に恋してに恋して off vocal ver., Nyū mūn ni koishite (off vocal ver.))"		4:24
4.	"eternal eternity (off vocal ver.)"		4:17
Total length:			17:20

==== New Moon ni Koishite/Otome no Susume ====
Disc 1
No.	Title	Artist	Length
1.	"Fall in Love with the New Moon (ニュームーンに恋して, Nyū mūn ni koishite)" (Tika α (lyrics, composer & arrangement))	Performed by Mitsuko Horie	4:24
2.	"A Maiden's Advice (乙女のススメ, Otome no susume)" (Yasuharu Konishi (composer & arrangement), Saori Kodama (lyrics))	performed by Misato Fukuen (Chibiusa)	2:25
3.	"Fall in Love with the New Moon (off vocal ver.) (に恋してに恋して off vocal ver., Nyū mūn ni koishite (off vocal ver.))"		4:24
4.	"A Maiden's Advice (off vocal ver.) (乙女のスス off vocal ver., Otome no susume (off vocal ver.))"		2:25
Total length:			13:38

==== New Moon ni Koishite/Eien Dake ga Futari wo Kakeru ====
Disc 1
No.	Title	Artist	Length
1.	"Fall in Love with a New Moon (ニュームーンに恋して, Nyū mūn ni koishite)" (Tika α (lyrics, composer & arrangement))	Performed by Momoiro Clover Z	4:24
2.	"Eternity Brings Two Together (永遠だけが二人をかける, Eien dake ga futari wo kakeru)" (Toshiyuki Omori (composer & arrangement), Goro Matsui (lyrics))	performed by Kenji Nojima (Tuxedo Mask)	4:31
3.	"Fall in Love with the New Moon (off vocal ver.) (に恋してに恋して off vocal ver., Nyū mūn ni koishite (off vocal ver.))"		4:24
4.	"Eternity Brings Two Together (off vocal ver.) (永遠だけが二人をかけるoff vocal ver., Eien dake ga futari wo kakeru (off vocal ver.))"		4:31
Total length:			?

==== Sailor Moon Crystal Original Soundtrack II ====
All tracks are written by Yasuharu Takanashi, except where noted.

Disc 1
No.	Title	Lyrics	Music	Length
1.	"Super Sailor Moon's Theme (スーパーセーラームーンのテーマ, Sūpā sērā mūn no tēma)"			2:31
2.	"Fall in Love with the New Moon (TV size) (ニュームーンに恋して (TVサイズ), Nyū mūn ni koishite (TV saizu))" (performed by Etsuko Yakushimaru)	Tika α	Tika α	1:33
3.	"Sea Serenade (海のセレナーデ, Umi no serenāde)"			2:20
4.	"Mysterious Encounter (ミステリアスな出逢い, Misuteriasu na deai)"			1:46
5.	"Haruka and Michiru (はるかとみちる, Haruka to Michiru)"			2:19
6.	"Master Pharaoh 90 (師・ファラオ90, Mastā farao 90)"			1:15
7.	"Kaolinite (カオリナイト, Kaorinaito)"			1:47
8.	"Anxious Dream (不安な夢, Fuan na yume)"			0:26
9.	"Hotaru (ほたる)"			2:01
10.	"Mysterious Guardians (謎の戦士, Nazo no senshi)"			1:34
11.	"Ripples of the Heart (心の波紋, Kokoro no hamon)"			1:39
12.	"Man or Woman, Why Does It Matter? (男とか女とか、そんなに大切なこと?, Otokotoka on'na toka, son'nani taisetsuna toko?)"			1:57
13.	"Eternal Eternity (TV Size) (eternal eternity (TVサイズ), eternal eternity (TV saizu))" (performed by Sailor Uranus (Junko Minagawa) and Sailor Neptune (Sayaka Ohara))	meg rock	Shinya Saitō	1:32
14.	"Uranus × Neptune Make Up! (ウラヌス×ネプチューン・メイクアップ!, Uranusu × nepuchūn meiku appu!)"			1:05
15.	"Sailor Uranus (セーラーウラヌス, Sērā uranusu)"			1:01
16.	"Sailor Neptune (セーラーネプチューン, Sērā nepuchūn)"			1:36
17.	"A Fascinated Soul (魅入られたる魂, Mīra retaru tamashī)"			2:26
18.	"Daimon (ダイモーン)"			1:57
19.	"Moon Cosmic Power Make Up! (ムーン・コズミックパワー・メイクアップ!, Mūn kozumikku pawā meiku appu!)"			1:52
20.	"Planet Power Make Up! (プラネット・パワー・メイクアップ!, Puranetto pawā meiku appu!)"			1:36
21.	"Arrival of Sailor Guardians (セーラー戦士参上, Sērā senshi sanjō)"			0:51
22.	"Magnificent Counterattack (華麗なる反撃, Karei naru hangeki)"			1:36
23.	"Moon Spiral Heart Attack! (ムーン・スパイラル・ハート・アタック!, Mūn supairaru hāto atakku!)"			0:30
24.	"Chibiusa and Hotaru -Flute version- (ちびうさとほたる -Flute version-）, Chibiusa to Hotaru -Flute version-)"			0:39
25.	"Chibiusa and Hotaru (ちびうさとほたる, Chibiusa to Hotaru)"			1:49
26.	"Chibiusa Make Up! (ちびうさメイクアップ!, Chibiusa meiku appu!)"			0:41
27.	"A Maiden's Advice (TV Size) (乙女のススメ (TVサイズ), Otome no susume (TV saizu))" (performed by Chibiusa (Misato Fukuen))	Saori Kodama, Yasuharu Konishi	Yasuharu Konishi	1:31
28.	"Mimi Hanyū (羽生美々, Hanyū Mimi)"			0:22
29.	"A Witch's Song (魔女の歌, Majō no uta)"			1:05

Disc 2
No.	Title	Lyrics	Music	Length
1.	"3 Guardians of the Outer Solar System (外部太陽系3戦士, Gaibu taiyōkei 3 senshi)"			1:19
2.	"The Mission of the 3 Guardians (3戦士の使命, 3 senshi no shimei)"			1:37
3.	"Fall in Love with the New Moon (TV Size) (ニュームーンに恋して (TVサイズ), Nyū mūn ni koishite (TV saizu))" (performed by Mitsuko Horie)	Tika α	Tika α	1:37
4.	"Mistress 9 (ミストレス9, Misutoresu 9)"			1:56
5.	"The Witch Awakens (魔女は目覚める, Majo wa mezameru)"			2:09
6.	"A Ruthless Challenger (冷酷な挑戦者, Reikoku na chōsen-sha)"			2:10
7.	"Fierce Battle with the Witches (魔女との激闘, Majo to no gekitō)"			2:03
8.	"Sorrowful (沈痛, Chintsū)"			1:57
9.	"Bonds of the Sailor Guardians (セーラー戦士の絆, Sērā senshi no kizuna)"			1:41
10.	"Shine of the Holy Grail (聖杯の輝き, Seihai no kageyaki)"			1:13
11.	"Crisis Make Up! (クライシス・メイクアップ!, Kuraishisu meiku appu!)"			1:53
12.	"Rainbow Moon Heartache! (レインボー・ムーン・ハートエイク!, Reinbō mūn hātoeiku!)"			0:31
13.	"Eternity Brings Two Together (TV Size) (永遠だけが二人を架ける (TVサイズ), Eien dake ga futari wo kakeru (TV saizu))" (performed by Tuxedo Mask (Kenji Nojima))	Gorō Matsui	Toshiyuki Ōmori	1:34
14.	"The Shadow of Fear (恐怖の影, Kyōfu no kage)"			0:33
15.	"The Demon that Consumes the Star (星を呑む悪魔, Hoshi wo nomu akuma)"			2:09
16.	"Those That Result in Ruin (破滅をもたらすもの, Hametsu wo motarasu mono)"			2:04
17.	"Hotaru's Feelings (ほたるの想い, Hotaru no omoi)"			2:01
18.	"Sorrowful Determination (哀しき決意, Kanashiki ketsui)"			2:22
19.	"Infinite Battle (無限大戦, Mugen taisen)"			2:23
20.	"Disappearing Planet (消えゆく星, Kie yuku hoshi)"			2:16
21.	"Silence Glaive (サイレンス・グレイブ, Sairensu gureibu)"			3:08
22.	"Light of Rebirth (再生の光, Saisei no hikari)"			2:36
23.	"Fall in Love with the New Moon (TV size) (ニュームーンに恋して (TVサイズ), Nyū mūn ni koishite (TV saizu))" (performed by Momoiro Clover Z)	Tika α	Tika α	1:35

=== Sailor Moon Eternal ===
==== Momoiro Clover Z edition (CD+Blu-ray) ====
CD
No.	Title	Lyrics	Music	Length
1.	"Moon Color Chainon (月色Chainon, Tsukiiro Chainon)"	Sumire Shirobara	Akiko Kosaka, Gesshoku Kaigi	4:20
2.	"Moonlight Legend (ムーンライト伝説, Mūnraito Densetsu)" (-ZZ ver.-)	Kanako Oda	Tetsuya Komoro, Kenji Kondo	2:53
3.	"Moon Revenge" (-ZZ ver.-)	Kayoko Fuyumori	Kosaka, Yukari Hashimoto	4:26
4.	"Tuxedo Mirage" (-ZZ ver.-)	Naoko Takeuchi	Kosaka, Daisuke Kikuta	3:36
5.	"MOON PRIDE" (-ZZ ver.-)	Revo	Revo	3:43
6.	"Gekkō (月虹, Moon Rainbow)" (-ZZ ver.-)	Shirobara	Kosaka	4:22
7.	"Fall in Love with a New Moon (ニュームーンに恋して, Nyū Mūn ni Koishite)" (-ZZ ver.-)	Etsuko Yakushimaru	Tika α	4:24
8.	"Moon Color Chainon (月色Chainon, Tsukiiro Chainon)" (off-vocal ver.)			4:20

Blu-ray Disc
No.	Title	Lyrics	Music	Length
1.	"Moon Color Chainon (月色Chainon, Tsukiiro Chainon)" (Artist Music Video)	Sumire Shirobara	Akiko Kosaka, Gesshoku Kaigi	4:20

==== Eternal edition (CD+Blu-ray) ====
CD
No.	Title	Lyrics	Music	Length
1.	"Moon Color Chainon (月色Chainon, Tsukiiro Chainon)" (performed by Momoiro Clover Z with Sailor5Guardians (Kotono Mitsuishi, Hisako Kanemoto, Rina Satō, Ami Koshimizu, Shizuka Itō))	Sumire Shirobara	Akiko Kosaka, Gesshoku Kaigi	4:20
2.	"Wanting to be Together with You (私たちになりたくて, Watashi-tachi ni Naritakute)" (performed by Yoko Ishida)	Yasushi Akimoto	Nozomi Inoue, Tomoki Hasegawa	5:17
3.	"I'll Go As Myself ("らしく" いきましょ, "Rashiku" Ikimasho)" (performed by ANZA)	Naoko Takeuchi	Masao Mizuno, Yukihiro Fukutomi	3:31
4.	"Moon Color Chainon (月色Chainon, Tsukiiro Chainon)" (off-vocal ver.)			4:20
5.	"Wanting to be Together with You (私たちになりたくて, Watashi-tachi ni Naritakute)" (off-vocal ver.)			5:17
6.	"I'll Go As Myself ("らしく" いきましょ, "Rashiku" Ikimasho)" (off-vocal ver.)			3:31

Blu-ray Disc
No.	Title	Lyrics	Music	Length
1.	"Moon Color Chainon (月色Chainon, Tsukiiro Chainon)" (Animation Music Video)	Sumire Shirobara	Akiko Kosaka, Gesshoku Kaigi	4:20

==== Pretty Guardian Sailor Moon Eternal The Movie Character Song Collection: Eternal Collection ====
No.	Title	Writer(s)	Artist	Length
1.	"ETERNAL MYSTAR"	CHI-MEY (composer, arrangement, lyrics)	Kotono Mitsuishi (as Super Sailor Moon)	3:29
2.	"formula in blue"	Takeshi Okamoto (composer, arrangement); Airi Konoha (lyrics)	Hisako Kanemoto (as Super Sailor Mercury)	3:18
3.	"Signpost"	SHOW (composer, lyrics); SHOW, Mitsu. J (arrangement)	Rina Satō (as Super Sailor Mars)	4:29
4.	"Don't Look Back"	Shingo Asari (composer, arrangement, lyrics)	Ami Koshimizu (as Super Sailor Jupiter)	4:34
5.	"I'm gonna be an IDOL!"	Tasashi Tsukida (composer, arrangement, lyrics)	Shizuka Itō (as Super Sailor Venus)	3:51
6.	"Dream-Colored First Love (夢色の初恋; Yumeiro no Hatsukoi)"	Yū Sonoda (composer, arrangement, lyrics)	Misato Fukuen (as Super Sailor Chibi Moon); Yoshitsugu Matsuoka (as Helios)	3:50
7.	"Astral Mission"	Hiroaki Suzuki (composer, arrangement); Mayu Miyazaki (lyrics)	Junko Minagawa (as Super Sailor Uranus); Sayaka Ohara (as Super Sailor Neptune); Ai Maeda (as Super Sailor Pluto); Yukiyo Fujii (as Super Sailor Saturn)	4:01
8.	"Welcome to the circus"	SHOW (composer, arrangement, lyrics)	Reina Ueda (as CereCere); Sumire Morohoshi (as PallaPalla); Yuko Hara (as JunJun); Rie Takahashi (as VesVes)	3:55
9.	"Dream's Eye (ドリームズ・アイ)"	MIKEY (Tokyo Gegegei), Hideaki Ayake (composer, arrangement); MARIE (Tokyo Gegegeki) (lyrics)	Shouta Aoi (as Fish Eye); Satoshi Hino (as Tiger's Eye); Toshiyuki Toyonaga (as Hawk's Eye)	3:34
10.	"Ray of light"	Mori Zentaro (lyrics, composer, arrangement)	Kenji Nojima (as Tuxedo Mask)	4:11
11.	"Moon Effect"	Gesshoku Kaigi (composer, arrangement, lyrics)	Kotono Mitsuishi (as Eternal Sailor Moon); Hisako Kanemoto (as Eternal Sailor Mercury); Rina Sato (as Eternal Sailor Mars); Ami Koshimizu (as Eternal Sailor Jupiter); Shizuka Ito (as Eternal Sailor Venus); Misato Fukuen (as Eternal Sailor Chibi Moon); Junko Minagawa (as Eternal Sailor Uranus); Sayaka Ohara (as Eternal Sailor Neptune); Ai Maeda (as Eternal Sailor Pluto); Yukiyo Fujii (as Eternal Sailor Saturn)	6:13

==== Pretty Guardian Sailor Moon Eternal The Movie Original Soundtrack ====
All tracks are written by Yasuharu Takanashi, except where noted.

Disc 1 (Part 1)
No.	Title	Lyrics	Music	Length
1.	"Beginning of the Nightmare (悪夢の始まり, Akumu no hajimari)"			0:26
2.	"It's April ~ Main Title (4月になって～メインタイトル, Shigatsu ni natte ~ Mein taitoru)"			0:40
3.	"My Dream Is... (あたしの夢は..., Atashi no yume wa...)"			0:44
4.	"Pegasus's Cry for Help (ペガサスの呼び声, Pegasasu no yobigoe)"			0:41
5.	"The Circus has Come (サーカスがやってきた, Sākasu ga yatte kita)"			0:27
6.	"Chibiusa's Dream (ちびうさの夢, Chibiusa no yume)"			0:42
7.	"The Pitch Dark World on the Other Side of the Mirror (鏡の向こうの真っ暗な世界, Kagami no mukō no makkura na sekai)"			0:40
8.	"Dead Moon Circus's Evil Scheme (デッド・ムーンサーカスの妖しい企み, Deddo Mūn Sākasu no ayashii takurami)"			0:59
9.	"Chibiusa and Helios ~ Flying Dream (ちびうさとエリオス～夢の中の飛翔, Chibiusa to Eriosu ~ Yume no naka no hishō)"			1:23
10.	"Young Maiden (乙女よ, Otome yo)"			0:26
11.	"Holy Grail Appears ~ Moon Crisis Make Up! (聖杯の出現～ムーン・クライシス・メイクアップ!, Seihai no Shutsugen ~ Mūn Kuraishisu Meiku Appu!)"			1:31
12.	"VesVes and PallaPalla's Attack! (ベスベスとパラパラの攻撃, BesuBesu to ParaPara no kōgeki)"			0:48
13.	"Helios's Present (エリオスの贈り物, Eriosu no okurimono)"			1:03
14.	"Moon Gorgeous Meditation! (ムーン・ゴージャス・メディテイション!, Mūn Gōjasu Mediteishon!)"			0:31
15.	"Reverse Orb! (逆玉！, Gyakutama!)"			0:35
16.	"Queen Nehelenia (女王ネヘレニア, Joō Neherenia)"			0:41
17.	"Mamoru and Usagi ~ I Wish I Could Stay By Your Side Forever (衛とうさぎ～ずっと側にいられたら, Mamoru to Usagi ~ Zutto soba ni iraretara)"			1:04
18.	"Chibiusa and Helios ~ In the Park at Night (ちびうさとエリオス～夜の公園で, Chibiusa to Eriosu ~ Yoru no kōen de)"			0:59
19.	"Ami ~ Thoughts on Family (亜美、家族への想い, Ami, kazoku e no omoi)"			0:25
20.	"The Birth of Amazon Trio (アマゾン・トリオ誕生, Amazon Torio tanjō)"			0:59
21.	"In Front of the Tropical Fish (熱帯魚の前で, Nettaigyo no mae de)"			0:27
22.	"Ami's Nightmare (亜美の悪夢, Ami no akumu)"			1:39
23.	"My Real Dream ~ Super Sailor Mercury Awakens (あたしの本当の夢～スーパーセーラーマーキュリー覚醒, Atashi no hontō no yume ~ Sūpa Sērā Mākyurī kakusei)"			1:39
24.	"Super Sailor Moon & Super Sailor Chibi Moon Arrive! (スーパーセーラームーン&スーパーセーラーちびムーン参上!, Sūpa Sērā Mūn & Sūpā Sērā Chibi Mūn sanjō!)"			0:34
25.	"Chibiusa's Tears ~ Don't Cry, Young Maiden (ちびうさの涙～泣かないで小さな乙女よ, Chibiusa no namida ~ Nakanaide chīsa na otome yo)" (Orchestra ver. of "Moon Color Chainon")		Composed by Akiko Kosaka, Arranged by Yasuharu Takanashi	2:43
26.	"Nehelenia's Ambition (ネヘレニアの野望, Neherenia no yabō)"			0:48
27.	"Rei's Companions (レイと仲間たち, Rei to nakama-tachi)"			0:55
28.	"Rei's Heart ~ One Day, I'll Take Off (レイの心～いつか飛び立つ日, Rei no kokoro ~ Itsuka tobidatsu hi)"			1:18
29.	"Scope Out the Circus! (サーカスを偵察よ!, Sākasu wo teisatsu yo!)"			0:59
30.	"Invitation to the Mirror House (ミラーハウスにご招待, Mirā Hausu ni go-shōtai)"			0:27
31.	"Rei Within the Mirror (鏡の中のレイ, Kagami no naka no Rei)"			1:31
32.	"The Dead Moon Circus Show Begins! (デッド・ムーンサーカス開演!, Deddo Mūn Sākasu kaien!)"			0:43
33.	"Phobos and Deimos ~ Super Sailor Mars Awakens (フォボスとディモス～スーパーセーラーマーズ覚醒, Fobosu to Dimosu ~ Sūpā Sērā Māzu kakusei)"			1:30
34.	"Mars Flame Sniper! (マーズ・フレイム・スナイパー!, Māzu Fureimu Sunaipā!)"			1:20
35.	"Annoyed Amazoness Quartet (アマゾネス・カルテットのいらだち, Amazonesu Karutetto no iradachi)"			0:38
36.	"Chibiusa's First Love (ちびうさの初恋, Chibiusa no hatsukoi)"			0:21
37.	"The Dream Makoto Wants to Fulfill (まことがかなえたい夢, Makoto ga kanaetai yume)"			1:51
38.	"The Aroma of Herbs and Makoto's Doubt (ハーブの香りとまことの迷い, Hābu no kaori to Makoto no mayoi)"			0:29
39.	"Hawk's Eye's Trap (ホークス・アイの罠, Hōkusu Ai no wana)"			0:54
40.	"Makoto's Determination ~ I Won't Lose! (まことの決意～負けない!, Makoto no ketsui ~ Makenai!)"			1:04
41.	"Super Sailor Jupiter Awakens (スーパーセーラージュピター覚醒, Sūpā Sērā Jupitā kakusei)"			1:12
42.	"Save Mamo-chan! (まもちゃんを救え! Mamo-chan wo sukue!)"			0:31
43.	"Helios Narrates ~ Truth About Elysion (エリオスは語る～エリュシオンの真実, Eriosu wa kataru ~ Eryushion no shinjitsu)"			2:20
44.	"Usagi and Mamoru ~ Your Pain is My Pain (うさぎと衛～あなたの苦しみはあたしの苦しみよ, Usagi to Mamoru ~ Anata no kurushimi wa atashi no kurushimi yo)"			0:41
45.	"The Amazoness Quartet's Evil Scheme (アマゾネス・カルテットの悪だくみ, Amazonesu Karutetto no warudakumi)"			0:34
46.	"Survival Audition (サバイバル・オーディション, Sabaibaru ōdishon)"			1:33
47.	"Minako Fallen into a Trap ~ Artemis to the Rescue (罠に落ちた美奈子～アルテミスの救援, Wana ni ochita Minako ~ Arutemisu no kyūen)"			1:06
48.	"Artemis's Resolve ~ Super Sailor Venus Awakens (アルテミスの覚悟～スーパーセーラーヴィーナス覚醒, Arutemisu no kakugo ~ Sūpā Sērā Vīnasu kakusei)"			2:29
49.	"Blitz! Amazoness Quartet (猛攻! アマゾネス・カルテット, Mōkō! Amazonesu Karutetto)"			0:52
50.	"Moon Color Chainon (Movie size) (月色Chainon (映画サイズ), Tsukiiro Chainon (Eiga saizu)" (Performed by Momoiro Clover Z with Sailor Moon (Kotono Mitsuishi), Sailor Mercury (Hisako Kanemoto), Sailor Mars (Rina Satō), Sailor Jupiter (Ami Koshimizu), Sailor Venus (Shizuka Itō))	Sumire Shirobara	Akiko Kosaka, Gesshoku Kaigi	2:35
51.	"Wanting to be Together with You (Movie size) (私たちになりたくて (映画サイズ), Watashi-tachi ni naritakute (Eiga saizu))" (Performed by Yoko Ishida)	Yasushi Akimoto	Nozomi Inoue, Tomoki Hasegawa	1:32

Disc 2 (Part 2)
No.	Title	Lyrics	Music	Length
1.	"Haruka and Michiru, Tranquil Days (はるかとみちる、やすらぎの日々, Haruka to Michiru, yasuragi no hibi)"			1:04
2.	"On the Day of the Solar Eclipse (皆既日食の日に, Kaiki nisshoku no hi ni)"			0:58
3.	"Guardians Who've Completed their Missions (使命を終えた戦士たち, Shimei wo oeta senshi-tachi)"			0:42
4.	"Hotaru's Violin (ほたるのヴァイオリン, Hotaru no vaiorin)"			0:30
5.	"Michiru's Premonition ~ When Waking Up from a Dream (みちるの予感～夢から覚めるとき, Michiru no yokan ~ Yume kara sameru toki)"			1:23
6.	"Hotaru's Solar System (ほたるの太陽系, Hotaru no taiyōkei)"			1:13
7.	"Sailor Saturn Once More (セーラーサターンふたたび, Sērā Sātān futatabi)"			1:06
8.	"Hotaru's Guidance ~ Main Title (ほたるの導き～メインタイトル, Hotaru no michibiki ~ Mein taitoru)"			2:17
9.	"Guardians of the Outer Solar System Awakens (外部太陽系戦士覚醒, Gaibu taiyōkei senshi kakusei)"			2:42
10.	"Sailor Guardian's Mission (セーラー戦士の使命, Sērā Senshi no shimei)"			1:37
11.	"The Four Are Back! ~ Usagi and Chibiusa's Determination (4人が帰って来た! ～うさぎとちびうさの決意, Yonin ga kaette kita! ~ Usagi to Chibiusa no ketsui)"			1:33
12.	"The Darkness of the Dark Moon (黒い月の闇, Kuroi tsuki no yami)"			0:52
13.	"Zirconia the Conductor of Souls (霊魂導士ジルコニア, Reikon Dōshi Jirukonia)"			1:48
14.	"Amazoness Quartet's Sadness (悲しきアマゾネス・カルテット, Kanashiki Amazonesu Karutetto)"			0:59
15.	"Zirconia's Wrath (ジルコニアの怒り, Jirukonia no ikari)"			1:14
16.	"Usagi's Happy Dream (うさぎの幸せな夢, Usagi no shiawase na yume)"			1:32
17.	"Holy Elysion Fall into Ruin (荒れ果てた聖地エリュシオン, Arehateta seichi Eryushion)"			0:41
18.	"Mamoru and Elysion ~ The Legend of the Two Crystals (衛とエリュシオン～2つのクリスタルの伝説, Mamoru to Eryushion ~ Futatsu no kurisutaru no densetsu)"			2:00
19.	"The Power Within Mamoru ~ Our Dreams are One (衛の中の力～2人の夢はひとつ, Mamoru no naka no chikara ~ futatsu no yume wa hitotsu)"			2:05
20.	"Nehelenia's Threats (ネヘレニアの脅威, Neherenia no kyōi)"			0:45
21.	"Guardians in Peril ~ Helios's Prayer (戦士たちの危機～エリオスの祈り, Senshi-tachi no kiki ~ Eriosu no inori)"			2:03
22.	"Zirconia's Nightmare Theater (ジルコニアの悪夢の劇場, Jirukonia no akumu no gekijō)"			1:22
23.	"Protecting This Planet Has Always Been Our Truth (この星を守る、それはいつだってあたし達の現実, Kono hoshi wo mamoru, sore wa itsu datte atashi-tachi no genjitsu)"			2:01
24.	"Showdown! Nehelenia and Super Sailor Moon (対決! ネヘレニアとスーパーセーラームーン, Taiketsu! Neherenia to Sūpā Sērā Mūn)"			1:09
25.	"Vision of the Previous Life ~ The Queen's Birth (前世のヴィジョン～クイーンの誕生, Zensei no vijon ~ Kuīn no tanjō)"			1:11
26.	"Uninvited Guest ~ Nehelenia's Curse (招かざる客～ネヘレニアの呪い, Manekazaru kyaku ~ Neherenia no noroi)"			3:17
27.	"Nehelenia's Grudge ~ The Power to Bring Forth Destruction (ネヘレニアの執念～破滅を呼ぶ力, Neherenia no shūnen ~ Hametsu wo yobu chikara)"			1:42
28.	"Moon Effect" (Performed by Eternal Sailor Moon (Kotono Mitsuishi), Eternal Sailor Mercury (Hisako Kanemoto), Eternal Sailor Mars (Rina Satō), Eternal Sailor Jupiter (Ami Koshimizu), Eternal Sailor Venus (Shizuka Itō), Eternal Sailor Chibi Moon (Misato Fukuen), Eternal Sailor Uranus (Junko Minagawa), Eternal Sailor Neptune (Sayaka Ohara), Eternal Sailor Pluto (Ai Maeda), Eternal Sailor Saturn (Yukiyo Fujii))	Gesshoku Kaigi	Gesshoku Kaigi	6:13
29.	"End of the Nightmare ~ Always Have a Shine of a Star in Your Heart (悪夢の終わり～いつでも胸に星の輝きを, Akumu no owari ~ itsu demo mune ni hoshi no kagayaki wo)"			1:24
30.	"Helios Awakens ~ Princess and Prince (エリオスの目覚め～プリンセスとプリンス, Eriosu no mezame ~ purinsesu to purinsu)"			2:51
31.	"Future Sailor Guardians (未来のセーラー戦士たちよ, Mirai no Sērā Senshi-tachi yo)"			2:25
32.	"We'll Meet Again, Someday in the Future (また会えるよね、いつか未来で, Mata aeru yo ne, itsuka mirai de)"			0:44
33.	"Moon Color Chainon (Movie size) (月色Chainon (映画サイズ), Tsukiiro Chainon (Eiga saizu)" (Performed by Momoiro Clover Z with Sailor Moon (Kotono Mitsuishi), Sailor Mercury (Hisako Kanemoto), Sailor Mars (Rina Satō), Sailor Jupiter (Ami Koshimizu), Sailor Venus (Shizuka Itō))	Sumire Shirobara	Akiko Kosaka, Gesshoku Kaigi	2:35
34.	"I'll Go as Myself (Movie size) ("らしく"いきましょ (映画サイズ), "Rashiku" ikimasho (Eiga saizu))" (performed by ANZA)	Naoko Takeuchi	Masao Mizuno, Yukihiro Fukutomi	1:34

=== Sailor Moon Cosmos ===
==== Pretty Guardian Sailor Moon Cosmos The Movie Theme Song Collection (CD+Blu-ray) ====
CD
No.	Title	Lyrics	Music	Length
1.	"Moon Flower (月の花, Tsuki no Hana)" (Performed by Daoko)	Daoko, Seiichi Negai	Seiichi Negai, Kensuke Ushio	4:01
2.	"Moonlight Legend (ムーンライト伝説, Mūnraito Densetsu)" (Performed by Kotono Mitsuishi (as Eternal Sailor Moon), Hisako Kanemoto (as Eternal Sailor Mercury), Rina Satō (as Eternal Sailor Mars), Ami Koshimizu (as Eternal Sailor Jupiter) and Shizuka Itō (as Eternal Sailor Venus))	Kanako Oda	Tetsuya Tomoro, Gesshoku Kaigi	3:05
3.	"Sailor Star Song (セーラースターソング, Sērā Sutā Songu)" (Performed by Nana Mizuki (as Sailor Kakyuu), Marina Inoue (as Sailor Star Fighter), Saori Hayami (as Sailor Star Maker), and Ayane Sakura (as Sailor Star Healer))	Naoko Takeuchi	Masaki Araki, Gesshoku Kaigi	3:55
4.	"To the Shooting Star (流れ星へ, Nagareboshi he)" (Performed by Marina Inoue (as Kō Seiya), Saori Hayami (as Kō Taiki), and Ayane Sakura (as Kō Yaten))	Naoko Takeuchi	Kisaburo Suzuki, Hidefumi Kenmochi	3:55
5.	"Happy Marriage Song" (Performed by Kotono Mitsuishi (as Usagi Tsukino), Kenji Nojima (as Mamoru Chiba), Misato Fukuen (as Chibiusa), Hisako Kanemoto (as Ami Mizuno), Rina Satō (as Rei Hino), Ami Koshimizu (as Makoto Kino), Shizuka Itō (as Minako Aino), Junko Minagawa (as Haruka Tenoh), Sayaka Ohara (as Michiru Kaioh), Ai Maeda (as Setsuna Meioh), and Yukiyo Fujii (as Hotaru Tomoe))	Akiko Kosaka	Akiko Kosaka, Gesshoku Kaigi	3:17
Total length:				18:15

Blu-ray Disc
No.	Title	Lyrics	Music	Length
1.	"Moon Flower (月の花, Tsuki no Hana)" (Music Video)	Daoko, Seiichi Negai	Seiichi Negai, Kensuke Ushio	4:00

==== Pretty Guardian Sailor Moon Cosmos The Movie Original Soundtrack ====
All tracks are written by Yasuharu Takanashi, except where noted.

Disc 1 (Part 1)
No.	Title	Lyrics	Music	Length
1.	"Meteor Shower (流星雨, Ryūseiu)"			0:59
2.	"Moonlight Legend (Movie size) (ムーンライト伝説 (映画サイズ), Mūnraito Densetsu (Eiga Saizu)" (Performed by Eternal Sailor Moon (Kotono Mitsuishi), Eternal Sailor Mercury (Hisako Kanemoto), Eternal Sailor Mars (Rina Satō), Eternal Sailor Jupiter (Ami Koshimizu) and Eternal Sailor Venus (Shizuka Itō))	Kanako Oda	Tetsuya Komoro, Gesshoku Kaigi	1:36
3.	"In the Refreshing Wind and Light (さわやかな風と光の中で, Sawayakana kaze to hikari no nakade)"			1:42
4.	"Three Lights' Theme (スリーライツのテーマ, Surīraitsu no tēma)"			0:38
5.	"Usagi's Love (うさぎの愛, Usagi no ai)"			1:35
6.	"Empty Pupil (うつろな瞳, Utsurona hitomi)"			1:20
7.	"Michiru and Haruka's Stage (みちるとはるかのステージ, Michiru to Haruka no sutēji)"			0:30
8.	"New Enemy, Sailor Animamates (新たな敵・セーラーアニマメイツ, Aratana teki, Sērā Animameitsu)"			0:55
9.	"Sailor Guardians, Transformation Time (セーラー戦士変身のとき, Sērā Senshi Henshin no Toki)"			0:41
10.	"Silver Moon Crystal Power, Make Up! (シルバー・ムーン・クリスタル・パワー・メイク・アップ!, Shirubā Mūn Kurisutaru Pawā Meiku Appu!)"			0:57
11.	"Eternal Sailor Uranus & Eternal Sailor Neptune's Brilliant Attack (エターナルセーラーウラヌス& エターナルセーラーネプチューン華麗なる攻撃, Etānaru Sērā Uranusu & Etānaru Sērā Nepuchūn kareinaru kōgeki)"			0:37
12.	"A Girl Who Fell from the Sky (空から降りてきた女の子, Sora kara orite kita on'nanoko)"			1:16
13.	"Chibi-Chibi (ちびちび, Chibi-Chibi)"			0:53
14.	"Transfer Students are Three Lights (転校生はスリーライツ, Tenkōsei wa Surīraitsu)"			0:51
15.	"Usagi and Three Lights (うさぎとスリタイツ, Usagi to Surīraitsu)"			0:45
16.	"Interesting Trio (気になる三人組, Ki ni naru san'ningumi)"			1:12
17.	"To the Shooting Star (流れ星へ, Nagareboshi he)" (Performed by Three Lights (Marina Inoue, Saori Hayami and Ayane Sakura))	Naoko Takeuchi	Kisaburo Suzuki, Hidefumi Kenmochi	3:54
18.	"To the Shooting Star (流れ星へ, Nagareboshi he)" (Piano Solo ver. I)		Composed by Kisaburo Suzuki, arranged by Yasuharu Takanashi	0:51
19.	"Attack of the Sailor Animamates (セーラーアニマメイツの襲撃, Sērā Animameitsu no shūgeki)"			1:43
20.	"Sailor Starlights Arrived (セーラースターライツ参上, Sērā Sutāraitsu sanjō)"			1:09
21.	"Stolen Sailor Crystal (奪われたセーラー・クリスタル, Ubawareta Sērā Kurisutaru)"			1:21
22.	"Usagi in the Fog (迷霧の中のうさぎ, Meimu no naka Usagi)"			2:05
23.	"Remember (思い出せ, Omoidase)"			0:55
24.	"To the Shooting Star (流れ星へ, Nagareboshi he)" (Piano Solo ver. II)		Composed by Kisaburo Suzuki, arranged by Yasuharu Takanashi	0:30
25.	"Sailor Galaxia's Theme (セーラーギャラクシアのテーマ, Sērā Gyarakushia no tēma)"			1:05
26.	"Minako's Super Secret Notebook (美奈子の超マル秘ノート, Minako no chō maru hi nōto)"			0:36
27.	"Minako's Dream High School Life (美奈子の夢の高校生活, Minako no yume no kōkō seikatsu)"			0:29
28.	"If You Call Yourself a Sailor Guardian (セーラー戦士を名乗るなら, Sērā Senshi o nanorunara)"			0:54
29.	"Sailor Starlights Transform (セーラースターライツ変身, Sērā Sutāraitsu henshin)"			0:31
30.	"Death Struggle at Hikawa Shrine (火川神社の死闘, Hikawa jinja no shitō)"			2:18
31.	"Starlight Honeymoon Therapy Kiss! (スターライト・ハネムーン・セラピー・キッス!, Sutāraito Hanemūn Serapī Kissu!)"			0:27
32.	"Afterglow of Extinction (消滅の残光, Shōmetsu no zankō)"			0:28
33.	"Crystal Palace Party (クリスタル・パレスのパーティ, Kuriutaru paresu no pāti)"			0:27
34.	"Chibiusa's Anxiety (ちびうさの不安, Chibiusa no fuan)"			1:07
35.	"Revived Memories (よみがえった記憶, Yomigaetta kioku)"			1:38
36.	"I am Nyanko Suzu (鈴にゃんこで一す, Suzu Nyanko dēsu)"			0:38
37.	"The True Nature of the Meteor Shower (流星雨の正体, Ryūseiu no shōtai)"			1:05
38.	"Nyanko Suzu Suddenly Approaches (鈴にゃんこ急接近, Suzu Nyanko kyū sekkin)"			0:19
39.	"To the Shooting Star (流れ星へ, Nagareboshi he)" (Mellow Ballad ver.)		Composed by Kisaburo Suzuki, arranged by Yasuharu Takanashi	1:07
40.	"Sailor Tin Nyanko's Anger (セーラーティンにゃんこの怒り, Sērā Tin Niyanko no ikari)"			1:41
41.	"Usagi's Sadness (うさぎの悲しみ, Usagi no kanashimi)"			0:54
42.	"Princess Kakyuu's Theme (火球皇女のテーマ, Kakyū Kōjo no tēma)"			1:06
43.	"Princess Kakyuu's Theme (火球皇女のテーマ, Kakyū Kōjo no tēma)" (Ver. B)			1:06
44.	"Princess Kakyuu's Theme (火球皇女のテーマ, Kakyū Kōjo no tēma)" (Ver. C)			1:07
45.	"Sailor Galaxia's Threat (セーラーギャラクシアの脅威, Sērā Gyarakushia no kyōi)"			1:12
46.	"Usagi's Determination (うさぎの決意, Usagi no ketsui)"			0:49
47.	"To the Shooting Star (流れ星へ, Nagareboshi he)" (Piano & String ver.)		Composed by Kisaburo Suzuki, arranged by Yasuharu Takanashi	1:33
48.	"Usagi and Seiya (うさぎと星野, Usagi to Seiya)"			1:05
49.	"Encounter with Sailor Galaxia (セーラーギャラクシアとの邂逅, Sērā Gyarakushia to no kaikō)"			2:06
50.	"Power of the Silver Moon Crystal (シルバー・ムーン・クリスタルの力, Shirubā Mūn Kurisutaru no chikara)"			0:55
51.	"Sailor Galaxia's Past ~ Wandering Journey (セーラーギャラクシアの過去～さすらいの旅路, Sērā Gyarakushia no kako ~ Sasurai no tabiji)"			1:12
52.	"Usagi's Feelings (うさぎの想い, Usagi no omoi)"			1:56
53.	"Moon Flower (月の花, Tsuki no Hana)" (Performed by Daoko)	Daoko, Seiichi Negai	Seiichi Negai, Kensuke Ushio	4:01
54.	"Come Quickly, Sailor Moon (早くおいでセーラームーン, Hayaku oide Sērā Mūn)"			0:27

Disc 2 (Part 2)
No.	Title	Lyrics	Music	Length
1.	"Premonition of Separation (別れの予感, Wakare no yokan)"			1:12
2.	"Transform ~ Depart to the Castle (変身~キャッスルへの旅立ち, Henshin ~ Kyassuru e no tabidachi)"			1:51
3.	"The Fate of the Guardians of the Outer Solar System (外部太陽系戦士のゆくえ, Gaibu taiyōkei senshi no yukue)"			1:33
4.	"Sailor Star Song (Movie Size) (セーラースタズソング (映画サイズ), Sērā Sutā Songu (eiga saizu)" (Performed by Sailor Kakyuu (Nana Mizuki), Sailor Star Fighter (Marina Inoue), Sailor Star Maker (Saori Hayami) and Sailor Star Healer (Ayane Sakura))	Naoko Takeuchi	Masaki Araki, Gesshoku Kaigi	1:40
5.	"River of Oblivion (忘却の川, Bōkyaku no kawa)"			2:17
6.	"Chibiusa's Determination ~ With Sailor Quartet (ちびうさの決意～セーラーカルテットとともに, Chibiusa no ketsui ~ Sērā Karutetto to tomoni)"			2:06
7.	"Sailor Mnemosyne's Feelings (セーラームオモシュネの想い, Sērā Munemoshine no omoi)"			1:25
8.	"Sailor Lethe and Sailor Mnemosyne (セーラーレテとセーラームネモシュネ, Sērā Rete to Sērā Munemoshine)"			2:00
9.	"Battle of Sailor Starlights ~ The Last Smile (セーラースターライツの戦い～最後の微笑み, Sērā Sutāraitsu no tatakai ~ saigo no hohoemi)"			2:14
10.	"Galactica Palace (ギャラクティカ・パレス, Gyarakutika Paresu)"			2:11
11.	"Sailor Heavy Metal Papillon's Challenge (セーラーヘヴィメタルパピヨンの挑戦, Sērā Hevu~i Metaru Papiyon no chōsen)"			1:27
12.	"Eternal Sailor Chibi Moon and Sailor Quartet Appears! (エターナルセーラーちびムーン&セーラークォーターが登場, Etānaru Sērā Chibi Mūn & Sērā Karutetto tōjō!)"			1:48
13.	"Mysterious Cute Sailor Chibi-Chibi Moon (可愛い神秘･セーラーちびちびムーン, Kawaii shinpi Sērā Chibi-Chibi Mūn)"			1:40
14.	"Noble Fighting Spirit (気高き闘志, Kedakaki tōshi)"			1:48
15.	"Sailor Kakyuu's Wish (セーラー火球の願い, Sērā Kakyū no negai)"			1:57
16.	"Showdown! Sailor Guardians (対決！セーラー戦士, Taiketsu! Sērā Senshi)"			1:53
17.	"Battle of Love and Sadness (愛と悲しみの攻防, Ai to kanashimi no kōbō)"			1:51
18.	"Counterattack of Tears (涙の反撃, Namida no hangeki)"			1:04
19.	"Decisive Battle! Sailor Galaxia (決戦！セーラーギャラクシア, Kessen! Sērā Gyarakushia)"			1:35
20.	"Two Thoughts Collide (激突する二つの想い, Gekitotsu suru futatsu no omoi)"			2:59
21.	"Hope Disappears in the Galaxy Cauldron (ギャラクシー・コルドロンに消える希望, Gyarakushī korudoron ni kieru kibō)"			1:49
22.	"Chaos, The Ruler of Darkness ~ At The End of the Battle (闇の支配者カオス～戦いの果てに, Yami no shihaisha Kaosu ~ Tataki no hateni)"			3:12
23.	"Entrusted Future ~ Sailor Galaxia's Lament (託された未来～セーラーギャラクシア哀歌, Takusu reta mirai ~ Sērā Gyarakushia aika)"			2:18
24.	"Believe in the New Future and Hope (新しい未来と希望を信じて, Atarashī mirai to kibō o shinjite)"			4:02
25.	"Sailor Cosmos (セーラーコスモス, Sērā Kosumosu)"			3:26
26.	"Reunion, and a New Star (再会、そして生まれる星, Saikai, shoshite umareru hoshi)"			4:17
27.	"Moon Flower (Movie Size) (月の花 (映画サイズ), Tsuki no Hana (Eiga saizu))" (Performed by Daoko)	Daoko, Seiichi Negai	Seiichi Negai, Kensuke Ushio	2:50
28.	"Moonlight Legend (Movie Size) (ムーンライト伝説 (映画サイズ), Mūnraito Densetsu (Eiga Saizu)" (Performed by Eternal Sailor Moon (Kotono Mitsuishi), Eternal Sailor Mercury (Hisako Kanemoto), Eternal Sailor Mars (Rina Satō), Eternal Sailor Jupiter (Ami Koshimizu) and Eternal Sailor Venus (Shizuka Itō))	Kanako Oda	Tetsuya Komoro, Gesshoku Kaigi	1:36
29.	"Happy Marriage Song (Movie size) (Happy Marriage Song (映画サイズ), Happy Marriage Song (Eiga saizu)" (Performed by Usagi Tsukino (Kotono Mitsuishi), Mamoru Chiba (Kenji Nojima), Chibiusa (Misato Fukuen), Ami Mizuno (Hisako Kanemoto), Rei Hino (Rina Satō), Makoto Kino (Ami Koshimizu), Minako Aino (Shizuka Itō), Haruka Tenoh (Junko Minagawa), Michiru Kaioh (Sayaka Ohara), Setsuna Meioh (Ai Maeda) and Hotaru Tomoe Yukiyo Fujii))	Akiko Kosaka	Akiko Kosaka, Gesshoku Kaigi	2:04
30.	"Star Line" (Performed by Three Lights (Marina Inoue, Saori Hayami and Ayane Sakura))	Keisuke Murakami	Keisuke Murakami, Renato Iwai	3:49

== Legacy ==
"Moonlight Densetsu" was released as a CD single in March 1992, and was an "explosive hit". "Moonlight Densetsu" won first place in the Song category in Animage's 15th and 16th Anime Grand Prix. It came seventh in the 17th Grand Prix, and "Moon Revenge", from Sailor Moon R: The Movie, came eighth. "Rashiku Ikimasho", the second closing song for SuperS, placed eighteenth in 1996. In 1997, "Sailor Star Song", the new opening theme for Sailor Stars, came eleventh, and "Moonlight Densetsu" came sixteenth.
