= Gokumontō Ikka =

Japanese band

Gokumontō Ikka 獄門島一家
- Origin: Tokyo, Japan
- Genres: Indie rock, indie pop
- Years active: 2013—present
- Labels: Paradox, Sony Music Associated Records
- Members: Avu-chan; Ryosuke Nagaoka; KenKen; Tatsuya Nakamura

Gokumontō Ikka (獄門島一家, "Hell's Gate Island Family") is a Japanese band that formed in 2013. The band is a supergroup formed of Avu-chan from Queen Bee, Ryosuke Nagaoka from Tokyo Jihen, KenKen from Rize and drummer Tatsuya Nakamura from Blankey Jet City.

== Biography ==
In February 2013, Avu-chan's band Queen Bee went on hiatus. While considering whether to continue music or to return home to Kobe, Avu-chan was asked by former Blankey Jet City drummer Tatsuya Nakamura if they could form a band together, and Avu-chan agreed. In addition to Nakamura, Avu-chan asked Tokyo Jihen guitarist Ryosuke Nagaoka to join the project (who had performed in the backing band for Queen Bee's final tour before their hiatus), as well as bassist KenKen of the band Rize, who Nakamura introduced to the project.

The band made their debut performance at the 2013 Rising Sun Rock Festival in August 2013, followed by their first solo concert in October, held at Liquidroom in Shibuya, Tokyo.

The band toured again in 2015, performing a second concert at Liquiroom in July, followed by concerts in Yokohama and Kyoto in November. At these concerts, the band unveiled their first release, Jitsuroku! Gokumontō Ikka, a magazine+extended play set, which was initially only sold during these live performances in November.

On March 25, 2016, Gokumontō Ikka and Queen Bee performed a dual concert in Roppongi, Tokyo, as the final of a six concert series of double-billed concerts. During the concert, the bands announced that they would release "Kinsei" / "Shibō Yūgi", a split single in May 2016. The cover art for the single was created by Kinu Nishimura, in the vein of her 1990s Capcom fighting game art. Avu-chan performs the trumpet on "Shibō Yūgi".

In 2018 the band reunited to perform at the Rising Sun Rock Festival for their fifth anniversary, where they performed a cover of 1980s boyband Shibugakitai's "Sushi Kui nee!"

== Members ==
The members of the band are given a fictional backstory and familial titles as stage names.

- Chōjo (長女, "Eldest Sister")
  Vocalist Avu-chan from the band Queen Bee.
- Chōnan (長男, "Eldest Son") or Onii-sama (お兄様, "Older Brother")
  Guitarist Ryosuke Nagaoka from the bands Petrolz and Tokyo Jihen.
- Jinan (次男, "Second-born Son") or Saionji (西園寺)
  Bassist KenKen from the band Rize.
- Otō-sama (お父様, "Father")
  Drummer Tatsuya Nakamura from Losalios, Mannish Boys, Blankey Jet City, Friction and The Stalin.

== Discography ==
=== Extended play ===
Title	Details
Jitsuroku! Gokumontō Ikka (実録！獄門島一家, "Real Recording! Gokumontō Ikka")	Released: November 3, 2015; Label: Paradox, Sony; Formats: CD/Magazine

=== Singles ===
List of singles, with selected chart positions
Title	Year	Peak chart positions		Album
Title	Year	JPN Oricon	JPN Hot Phys	Album
"Shibō Yūgi" (死亡遊戯, "Game of Death")	2016	24	24	Non-album single
