= Tatsuya Nakamura =

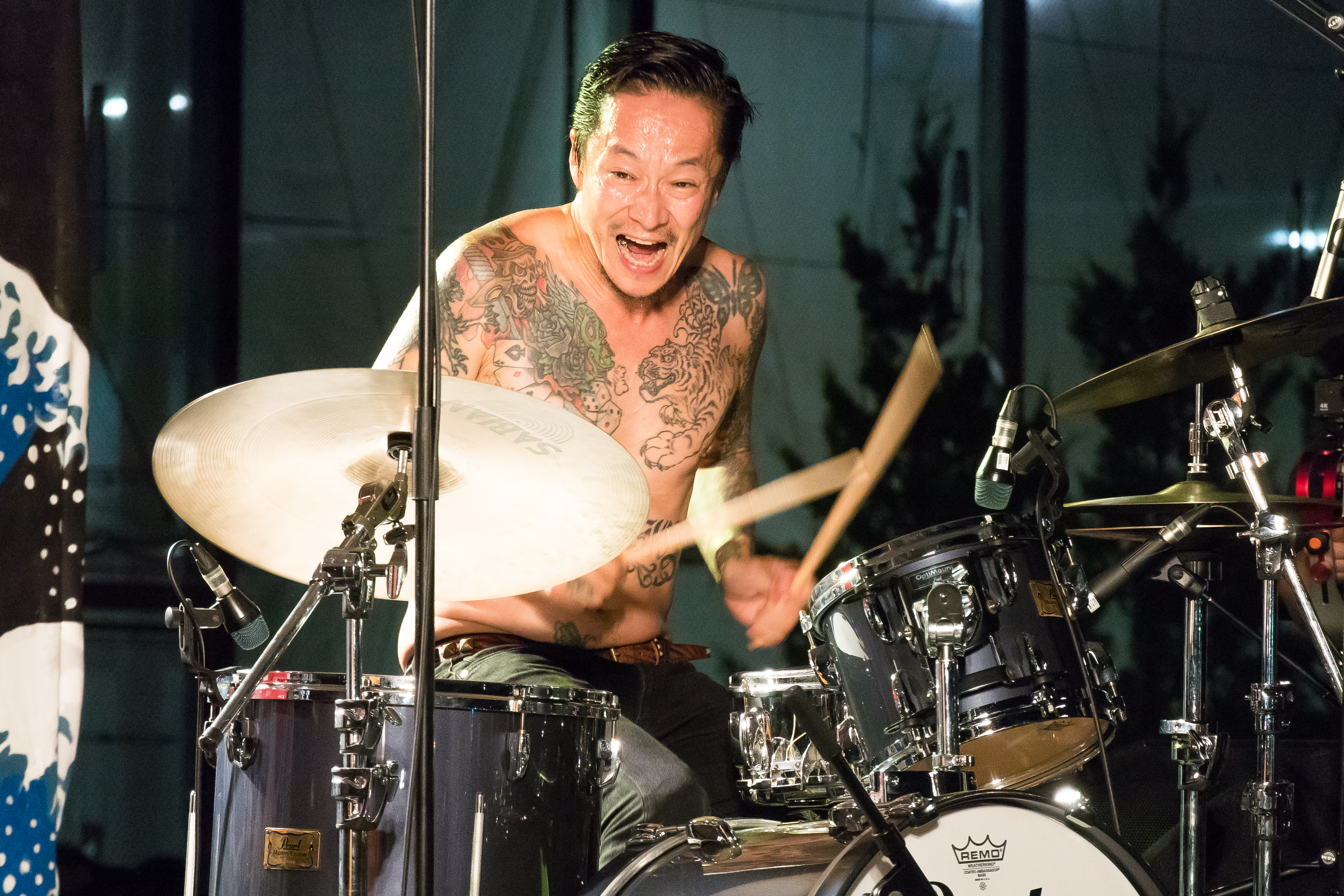
- Nakamura in Tokyo, August 2016

Background information
- Born: January 4, 1965 (age 61); Toyama, Japan
- Genres: Rock, punk rock
- Occupations: Musician, drummer, actor
- Instrument: Drums

Tatsuya Nakamura (中村 達也, Nakamura Tatsuya; born January 4, 1965, in Toyama) is a Japanese musician, drummer and actor. After performing with several prominent punk rock bands, Nakamura rose to fame as drummer of Blankey Jet City from 1987 to 2000. In 1996, he founded his solo project Losalios, where he performs every instrument. He is also a member of Friction, Mannish Boys with Kazuyoshi Saito, and Gokumontō Ikka.

== Biography ==
Tatsuya Nakamura has been working as a drummer since he was a teenager, performing with various bands such as Oxydoll, Genbaku Onanies, The Stalin, The God, Masturbation, Nickey & The Warriors, and The Star Club. After coming up to Tokyo, he went wrong and hunted the leather jacket of motorcycle gangs around Kanto, and he competed with his fellows for the number. When Nakamura had time job at a record store, he found a kindred spirit in Kenichi Asai whom he met by chance at a disco. Then, Nakamura and Asai formed Blankey Jet City with Toshiyuki Terui in 1987.

Nakamura started a design for his solo works "Love Shop Losalios" which he composes all by himself in 1996, and he released 1st album "Sekaichizu wa Chi no Ato (世界地図は血の跡, World map is a trace of blood)" in which many musicians, such as Asai, Terui, Ken Morioka, and Tokyo Ska Paradise Orchestra, participated under the name of Losalios in November 1999.

Blankey Jet City disbanded in 2000. Nakamura restarted Losalios in 2002. Nakamura released the collaboration album "Buck Jam Tonic" of John Zorn and Bill Laswell in 2003. Nakamura formed Twin Tail with Toshiyuki Terui, Yuji Katsui (ROVO) and others in 2006. Nakamura is active under the name of Friction with Reck at present.

Nakamura starred in the movie "Yomigaeri no Chi (蘇りの血, the blood of the resurrection; Director: Toshiaki Toyoda)" released in December 2009. Nakamura appeared on the last episode of NHK Taiga drama "Ryōmaden" in 2010.

In June 2011, Nakamura formed the rock duo Mannish Boys with guitarist and singer Kazuyoshi Saito. They had their first concert at the Join Alive music festival on July 24, and their second at the Fuji Rock Festival on July 31. In 2013, Nakamura formed the band Gokumontō Ikka alongside Avu-chan from Queen Bee, Tokyo Jihen's Ryosuke Nagaoka and KenKen from Rize.

== Discography ==
=== The Stalin ===
- Mushi (1983)

=== Other ===
- Buck Jam Tonic (2003)
- Honeycreeper (2007) – drums on "Kimi to Otobai" and "Hayai Kuruma"
- Mind Travel (2011)
- Fight (2011) – drums on "Monjai Beat"
- Music Life (2014) – drums on "Till Kingdom Come"

== Filmography ==
=== Dramas ===
- Shiritsu Tantei Hama Mike (私立探偵 濱マイク, Private detective Mike Hama) as Nobu (Nippon Television, 2002)
- Shūkan Maki Yoko (週刊真木よう子, Weekly Yoko Maki) as Tatsuya (TV Tokyo, 2008)
- Ryōmaden as Sasaki Tadasaburō (佐々木只三郎), Member of Kyoto Mimawarigumi (NHK, 2010)

=== Movies ===
- Bullet Ballet as Idei (There is Enterprise, 1999)
- 696 Traveling High (Slow Learner, 2001) – Documentary Film
- L'amant as tattooist (Slow Learner, 2004)
- Otoko wa Sore wo Gaman dekinai (男はソレを我慢できない, A man cannot stand that) as Tatsuya (Kinetic, 2006)
- Nada Sōsō as Akiyoshi Kinjo (Toho, 2006)
- Kikoe (Slow Learner, 2009) – Documentary Film
- Yomigaeri no Chi (蘇りの血, the blood of the resurrection) as Oguri (Phantom film, 2009)
- Bakugyaku Familia (Toei, 2012)
- Fires on the Plain (2014)
- Evil and the Mask (2018)
- Killing (2018)
- Noroshi ga Yobu (2019)
- Burai (2020)
