= Mephisto (song) =

2023 single by Queen Bee

- Standard edition cover

Single by Queen Bee

from the album Aku
- Language: Japanese; English
- B-side: "Faust"
- Released: April 20, 2023
- Genre: Rock; anime song
- Length: 3:50
- Label: Ziyoou; Sony Music Associated
- Songwriter: Avu Barazono
- Producers: Queen Bee; Kōji Tsukada

Queen Bee singles chronology
"Mysterious" (2022)	"Mephisto" (2023)	"01" (2023)

Alternative cover
- Digital and first press limited editions cover

Music video
- "Mephisto" on YouTube

"Mephisto" (メフィスト, Mefisuto) is a song by Japanese rock band Queen Bee from their ninth studio album Aku (2025). It was released on April 20, 2023, through their own Ziyoou Records and Sony Music Associated Records. The song served as the ending theme of the first season of Japanese anime series Oshi no Ko .

== Background and release ==
On March 2, 2023, Queen Bee announced that they would perform the ending theme of anime series 'Oshi no Ko, titled "Mephisto", alongside the band's Japan tour Mephisto Shōkan. The single was released to digital music and streaming platforms on April 20, and on CD single on May 17 with two versions—limited and anime editions. The music video, directed by Sayaka Nakane, was uploaded on May 17, depicting the life of idol Avu-chi. It stars the band's members, and actress Karin Ono.

Titled after German folklore demon Mephistopheles, lead vocalist and songwriter Avu-chan explained to Billboard Japan in August 2023 that they used the motif of the legend's protagonist Faust for the main idea of "Mephisto", alongside authors who "richly depicted the doings and passion of people", e.g. Go Nagai, Yukio Mishima and William Shakespeare.

== Accolades ==
Critics' rankings of "Mephisto"
Publication	Accolade	Rank	Ref.
Anime News Network	The Best Songs of 2023	—N/a	
Screen Rant	2023's Best Anime EDs	3	

Awards and nominations for "Mephisto"
Ceremony	Year	Award	Result	Ref.
Reiwa Anisong Awards	2023	Artist Song Award	Won	
8th Crunchyroll Anime Awards	2024	Best Ending Sequence	Nominated	

== Track listing ==
- Digital download and streaming
1. "Mephisto" (メフィスト) – 3:50
- Standard edition
1. "Mephisto" – 3:50
2. "Faust" (ファウスト) – 3:13
3. "Mephisto" (anime size edit) – 1:31
4. "Mephisto" (off vocal version) – 3:49
- Digital and first press limited editions
1. "Mephisto" – 3:50
2. "Faust" – 3:13
3. "Mephisto" (off vocal version) – 3:50
4. "Faust" (off vocal version) – 3:11
- First press limited edition – disc 2 (Blu-ray) – Avu-chan Birthday Festival 2022: Harpie Gal (2022.12.25 Live at Zepp DiverCity (Tokyo))
1. "Shitsurakuen" (失楽園)
2. "P R I D E"
3. "Violence" (バイオレンス, Baiorensu)
4. "Venus" (ヴィーナス, Vinasu)
5. "Ten" (十; Jū)
6. "Utahime" (歌姫)
7. "Inuhime" (犬姫)
8. "Introduction"

== Charts ==
=== Weekly charts ===
Weekly chart performance for "Mephisto"
Chart (2023)	Peak position
Japan (Japan Hot 100)	13
Japan Hot Animation (Billboard Japan)	4
Japan (Oricon)	16
Japan Combined Singles (Oricon)	18
Japan Anime Singles (Oricon)	5

=== Year-end charts ===
Year-end chart performance for "Mephisto"
Chart (2023)	Position
Japan (Japan Hot 100)	64
Japan Hot Animation (Billboard Japan)	17

== Certifications ==
Certifications for "Mephisto"
Region	Certification	Certified units/sales
Streaming
Japan (RIAJ)	Platinum	100,000,000^{†}
^{†} Streaming-only figures based on certification alone.

== Release history ==
Region	Date	Format	Version	Label	Ref.
Various	April 20, 2023	Digital download; streaming	Digital one-track single	Ziyoou; Sony Music Associated	
Japan	May 17, 2023	CD	Standard	Ziyoou; Sony Music Associated	
Japan	May 17, 2023	CD; digital download; streaming	First press limited	Ziyoou; Sony Music Associated	
Japan	May 17, 2023	CD+Blu-ray	First press limited	Ziyoou; Sony Music Associated	
