= Midori (band) =

Japanese rock band

Midori (ミドリ)
- Midori in 2009

Background information
- Origin: Osaka, Japan
- Genres: Punk jazz; noise rock; jazz fusion; progressive rock; experimental rock; post-hardcore; art punk; Japanoise
- Years active: 2003–2010
- Labels: GYUUNE CASSETTE; Sony Music Entertainment
- Past members: Mariko Gotō; Hajime; Yoshitaka Kozeni; Keigo Iwami

Midori (ミドリ) was a Japanese punk jazz band. They were founded in Osaka in 2003 by former members of the noise and punk rock band Usagi (うさぎ), Mariko Gotō and Yoshitaka Kozeni. Their final lineup featured Gotō on vocals and guitar, Kozeni on drums, Keigo Iwami on bass, and Hajime on keyboard.

Gotō often wore school uniforms while performing, and would climb speakers and crowd surf. The band initially formed to play covers of kayōkyoku, but decided they weren't talented enough, and began to write their own songs. As they developed, their influences included Italian prog, Kodō, the J-rock band Judy & Mary, and Janis Joplin.

Their disbandment was publicly announced by Gotō on December 25, 2010, with their last show, titled "Sayonara, Gotō-san", played on December 28.

Midori released three albums, three extended plays, and two demos. Midori released their last two albums under Sony Entertainment after a disagreement with their previous label.

== Style and songwriting ==
Midori's musical style is characterized by the distinctive vocal delivery of lead singer Mariko Gotō, which encompasses a range from melodic singing to intense screaming. Following 2008, Gotō's vocal approach shifted towards more melodic expressions, a change she attributes to gaining confidence in her singing abilities. A significant alteration in the band's instrumental lineup occurred post-2004 with the introduction of Hajime, leading to the replacement of a second electric guitar with a piano.

According to Midori, their sound — which integrates elements of art punk, post-hardcore, and jazz rock — reflects the diverse musical backgrounds of their members.

Mariko Gotō, the primary lyricist for Midori, described her approach to writing as spontaneous, without adherence to any predetermined structure. Gotō reflected on this method during the creation of Shinsekai, expressing regret over this spontaneous approach, feeling it catered more to the expectations of Midori's fanbase rather than fulfilling her artistic intentions.

In an interview, she was asked to describe their sound overall, responding with: "I'd say we're a punk band. But the sort of punk we make is nostalgic and lonely. It's like a four-tatami room with just one door and one window; a very old, small, seedy apartment. And there's a bald, old guy sitting in there alone, screaming and screaming. That's punk to me."

=== Live performances ===
Midori's live performances were renowned for their intense energy, a hallmark of which was lead singer Mariko Gotō's choice of attire and her interaction with the audience, which included shouting obscenities and, on occasion, removing her outfit to throw it into the crowd.

Keyboardist Hajime has linked these dynamic performances to the "explosive power" inherent in their music. Drummer Kozeni has commented on the band's preference for analog recording techniques, suggesting that the unrefined quality of such recordings better captures the essence of Midori's sound. Gotō herself has described the band's live shows as a collaborative creation between Midori and their audience, emphasizing the raw, unfiltered exchange of energy that defines their concerts.

== Band members ==
=== Official line-up ===
- 後藤まりこ (Mariko Gotō) — lead vocals, guitar (2003–2010)
- ハジメ (Hajime) or ハジメタル (Hajimetal) — keyboards (2004–2010)
- 小銭喜剛 (Yoshitaka Kozeni) — drums (2003–2010)
- 岩見継吾 (Keigo Iwami) or 岩見のとっつぁん (Iwami no Tottsan) — stand up bass (2008–2010)

=== Former members ===
- 桑野嘉文 (Kuwano Yoshifumi) – bass (2003)
- 井尾良太 (Io Ryota) – guitar (2003–2004)
- 劔樹人 (Tsurugi Jujin) – bass (2003–2004)
- 矢野雅俊 (Yano Masatoshi) – vocals (2004)
- 博智 (Hirochi) – samples (2003–2005)

== Discography ==
=== Albums ===
Year	Album details
2007	セカンド♥ (Second ♥): Release date: April 4, 2007; Label: GYUUNE CASSETTE; Format: CD, LP
2008	あらためまして、はじめまして、ミドリです (Aratamemashite, Hajimemashite, Midori Desu): Release date: May 14, 2008; Label: Sony Music; Format: CD, LP
2010	Shinsekai: Release date: May 19, 2010; Label: Sony Music; Format: CD

=== Extended plays ===
Year	EP details
2005	ファースト♥ (First ♥): Release date: November 25, 2005; Label: GYUUNE CASSETTE; Format: CD
2007	清水 (Shimizu): Release date: November 21, 2007; Label: Sony Music; Format: CD, LP
2008	ライブ!! (Live!!): Release date: November 5, 2008; Label: Sony Music; Format: CD

=== Demos ===
Year	Details
2003	ファースト (First): Release date: 2003; Label: N/A; Format: CD
2005	セカンド (Second): Release date: 2005; Label: N/A; Format: CD

=== DVDs ===
- 初体験 (Initial Experience) (October 7, 2009; recorded June 6, 2009) AIBL-9179
- さよなら、後藤さん。 (Goodbye, Gotō-san) (April 6, 2011; recorded December 30, 2010) AIBL-9213 (limited edition: AIBL-9211)

=== Singles ===
- "Swing" (March 18, 2009) AICL-2004 (Limited Edition: AICL-2003)
