= Queen Bee (band) =

Japanese rock band

Queen Bee 女王蜂
- Also known as: QB, Ziyoou-vachi
- Origin: Kobe, Hyogo Prefecture, Japan
- Genres: Disco kayō, punk, rock
- Years active: 2009–present
- Labels: Ziyoou Record; Sony Music Associated Records (2011–present)
- Members: Avu-chan; Yashi-chan; Hibari-kun
- Past members: Yūki-chan; Gigi-chan; Ruri-chan
- Website: ziyoou-vachi.com

Queen Bee (stylized in all caps) is a Japanese rock band, formed in Kobe on March 31, 2009. They are known in Japan as Ziyoou-vachi (Japanese: 女王蜂, Hepburn: Joōbachi) and have described their genre of music and imagery themselves as "fashion punk".

In 2009 the band recorded and, at the beginning of 2010, self-released an extended play record on CD-R through their own Ziyoou Record (女王レコード, Joō Rekōdo) label, followed by another the same year, which they sold at their performances. In 2011 they had their first album, Witch Hunt, professionally manufactured and distributed. Later the same year they signed a major label contract, making Ziyoou Record a sub-label of Sony Music Associated Records. They have since released six full-length major-label albums and their music has been featured in the films Love Strikes!, Sadako and Tokyo Ghoul 'S' and the television programs Spooky Romantics, Tokyo Ghoul:re, Dororo, Chainsaw Man, Undead Unluck, and Oshi no Ko.

== Members ==
All members of Queen Bee work under pseudonyms and such personal details as their age, family and educational background are not officially stated, though have sometimes been alluded to in passing by members or addressed in their songs' lyrics.

=== Current members ===
- Avu-chan (アヴちゃん) – lead vocals, second guitar (2009–present)

The lyricist and composer of the band's songs, credited in these capacities (and when writing songs for other acts) as Barazono Avu-sama (薔薇園アヴ様).

- Yashi-chan (やしちゃん) – bass guitar (2009–present)

Full pseudonym Yashi Akatorii (赤鳥居ヤシ, Akatorii Yashi; "Red torii Yashi").
Reported to be Avu-chan's best friend.

- Hibari-kun (ひばりくん) – lead guitar (2015–present)

=== Past members ===
- Yūki-chan – lead guitar (2009)
- Gigi-chan (ギギちゃん) – lead guitar (2009–2012)

Full pseudonym Gigi Yurijō (百合城ギギ, Yurijō Gigi; "Lily castle Gigi").

- Ruri-chan (ルリちゃん) – drums (2009–2023)

Full pseudonym Ruri Nijigamine (虹ヶ峰ルリ, Nijigamine Ruri; "Mountain summit of rainbows Ruri").
Reported to be Avu-chan's real sister.

== Discography ==
=== Studio albums ===
Title	Details	Peak chart positions	
Title	Details	JPN Oricon	JPN Hot
Witch Hunt (魔女狩り, Majo-gari)	Released: March 2, 2011 (JPN); Label: Ziyoou Record; Formats: CD	109	—
Peacock (孔雀, Kujaku)	Released: September 7, 2011 (JPN); Label: Sony Music Entertainment Japan; Formats: CD, digital download	50	— (Note: Peacock was released before the creation of the Billboard Japan Hot Albums chart, however peaked at number 44 on the Billboard Japan Top Albums physical sales chart.)
Snake Princess (蛇姫様, Hebihime-sama)	Released: May 23, 2012 (JPN); Label: Sony; Formats: CD, digital download	53	— (Note: Snake Princess was released before the creation of the Billboard Japan Hot Albums chart, however peaked at number 45 on the Billboard Japan Top Albums physical sales chart.)
Kirei (奇麗; "Pretty")	Released: March 25, 2015 (JPN); Label: Sony; Formats: CD, CD/DVD, digital download	37	— (Note: Kirei was released before the creation of the Billboard Japan Hot Albums chart, however peaked at number 32 on the Billboard Japan Top Albums physical sales chart.)
Q	Released: April 5, 2017 (JPN); Label: Sony; Formats: CD, CD/DVD, digital download	12	13
Ten (十, Jū)	Released: May 22, 2019 (JPN); Label: Sony; Formats: CD, CD/DVD, digital download, streaming	5	2
BL	Released: February 19, 2020 (JPN); Label: Sony; Formats: CD, digital download, streaming	6	8
12D (十二次元, Jūni Jigen)	Released: February 1, 2023 (JPN); Label: Sony; Formats: CD, CD/Blu-ray, digital download, streaming	15	12
Aku (悪; "Evil")	Released: March 5, 2025; Label: Sony; Formats: CD, digital download, streaming	25	—
"—" denotes releases that did not chart, or released prior to the creation of the Billboard Top Albums Chart.

=== Extended plays ===
Title	Details	Peak chart positions	
Title	Details	JPN Oricon	JPN Hot
Hime-sama Goranshin (姫様御乱心; "The Mad Princess")	Released: 2010; Label: Ziyoou Record; Formats: CD	—	—
Ōzoku Daigekirin (王族大逆鱗; "The Wrath of the Royal Family")	Released: 2010; Label: Ziyoou Record; Formats: CD	—	—
Shisshin (失神; "Faint")	Released: July 22, 2015 (JPN); Label: Sony; Formats: CD, digital download, streaming	55	— (Note: Shisshin was released before the creation of the Billboard Japan Hot Albums chart, however peaked at number 54 on the Billboard Japan Top Albums physical sales chart.)
"—" denotes releases that did not chart.

=== Singles ===
==== As lead artist ====
List of singles, with selected chart positions and certifications
Title	Year	Peak chart positions		Certifications	Album
Title	Year	JPN	JPN Hot	Certifications	Album
"Venus" (ヴィーナス)	2015	53	— (Note: "Venus" did not enter the Billboard Japan Hot 100 chart, but peaked at number 48 on the Billboard Japan Top Single Sales physical chart.)		Kirei
"Baishun" (売旬) (featuring Ai Shinozaki or Ryōhei Shima)	2015	—	—		Kirei and Shisshin
"Kinsei" (金星) (Note: "Kinsei" was released as a split single with Gokumontō Ikka's "Shibō Yūgi".)	2016	24	— (Note: "Kinsei" did not enter the Billboard Japan Hot 100 chart, but peaked at number 24 on the Billboard Japan Top Single Sales physical chart.)		Q
"Shitsurakuen" (失楽園) (Note: Released as a double A-side single.)	2017	—	—		Q
"Dance Dance Dance"	2017	—	—		Q
"Half"	2018	25	14		Ten
"Hypnotize" (催眠術)	2018	14	58		Ten
"Fire" (火炎)	2019	22	24		Ten
"Feels Like 'Heaven' "	2019	—	—		Non-album singles
"Starry Night" (夜天, Yaten)	2021	16	— (Note: "Starry Night" did not enter the Billboard Japan Hot 100 chart, but peaked at number 19 on the Billboard Japan Top Single Sales physical chart.)		Non-album singles
"King Bitch"	2021	21	— (Note: "King Bitch" did not enter the Billboard Japan Hot 100 chart, but peaked at number 20 on the Billboard Japan Top Single Sales physical chart.)		12D
"Inu-hime" (犬姫)	2022	—	— (Note: "Inu-hime" did not enter the Billboard Japan Hot 100 chart, but peaked at number 58 on the Billboard Japan Download Songs chart.)		12D
"Mysterious"	2022	21	— (Note: "Mysterious" did not enter the Billboard Japan Hot 100 chart, but peaked at number 59 on the Billboard Japan Download Songs chart.)		12D
"Violence" (バイオレンス)	2022	—	91		12D
"Rejuvenation" (回春, Kaishun) (featuring Hikari Mitsushima)	2023	—	— (Note: "Rejuvenation" did not enter the Billboard Japan Hot 100 chart, but peaked at number 34 on the Billboard Japan Download Songs chart.)		12D
"Mephisto" (メフィスト)	2023	16	13	RIAJ: Platinum (st.)	Aku
"01"	2023	19	—		Aku
"—" denotes items that did not chart.

==== Promotional singles ====
List of singles, with selected chart positions
Title	Year	Peak chart positions	Album
Title	Year	JPN Hot	Album
"France Ningyō no Noroi" (フランス人形の呪い; "Curse of the French Doll")	2011	—	Witch Hunt
"Desco" (デスコ; "Death Disco")	2011	88	Peacock
"Ikki Uchi" (一騎討ち; "Single Combat")	2015	—	Kirei
"Kinkyū Jitai" (緊急事態; "Emergency")	2015	—	Kirei
"Thriller" (スリラ, Surira)	2015	—	Shisshin
"Kinsei" (featuring Daoko)	2017	—	Q
"Holy War" (聖戦, Seisen)	2019	—	Ten
"BL"	2020	56	BL
"Oil" (油, Abura)	2023	—	12D
"—" denotes items that did not chart.

=== Guest appearances ===
List of non-single guest appearances with other performing artists
Title	Year	Album
"Kirifuda" (切り札; "Trump Card")	2009	Komusume no Iinari
"Tsugeguchi" (live)	2010	School Smash '10 (DVD)
"Eternal Eternity"	2018	Pretty Guardian Sailor Moon: The 25th Anniversary Memorial Tribute
"Headless Angel"	2024	Last Kingdom (Goddess of Victory: Nikke Original Soundtrack)

=== Videos ===
==== Video albums ====
Title	Details	Peak chart positions	
Title	Details	JPN DVD	JPN BLU
Suzumevachi (雀蜂, Suzumebachi; "Hornet")	Released: November 30, 2011 (JPN); Label: Sony; Formats: DVD	92	—
Hakuheisen (白兵戦; "Hand-to-Hand Combat")	Released: December 4, 2013 (JPN); Label: Sony; Formats: DVD	114	—
A: Zenkoku Tour 2017 (A ―全国ツアー2017―; "A: Nationwide Tour 2017")	Released: December 13, 2017 (JPN); Label: Sony; Formats: DVD+CD, digital download (audio)	15	—
Flat: Hall Live 2018	Released: March 27, 2019 (JPN); Label: Sony; Formats: DVD, BD	48	71
Nippon Budōkan Tandoku Kōen 2days Hyper Black Love 20210224 Yaten Kekkō 20210225 (日本武道館単独公演 2days「HYPER BLACK LOVE」20210224「夜天決行」20210225)	Released: August 4, 2021; Label: Sony; Formats: DVD, BD	13	5
"—" denotes items that were not released on Blu-ray.

==== Music videos ====
List of music videos showing year released, other featured artists and directors
Title	Year	Director(s)	Ref.
"Matsu Onna" (待つ女; "Waiting Woman")	2010		
"Desco"	2011	Avu Barazono	
"Hi no Tori" (火の鳥; "Phoenix")	2011		
"Hachijūnendai" (80年代; "The '80s")	2011		
"Tsugeguchi" (告げ口; "Snitch")	2011		
"France Ningyō no Noroi"	2011		
"Kuchisake Onna" (口裂け女; "Slit-Mouthed Woman")	2011		
"Moeru Umi" (燃える海; "Burning Sea")	2011		
"Strawberry" (ストロベリヰ, Sutoroberī)	2012	Avu Barazono	
"Teppeki" (鉄壁; "Iron Wall")	2014		
"Venus"	2015	Satoshi Takaki	
"Kinkyū Jitai"	2015	Masaki Shinozuka	
"Baishun"	2015		
"Thriller"	2015	Nobb Sueyoshi	
"Kinsei"	2016	Kentaro Osawa	
"Dance Dance Dance"	2017	Kento Yamada	
"Shitsurakuen"	2017	Kento Yamada	
"Q"	2017	Kento Yamada	
"Outroduction" (アウトロダクション, Autorodakushon)	2017	Kento Yamada	
"Half"	2018	Sayaka Nakane	
"Hypnotize"	2018	Sayaka Nakane	
"Fire"	2019	Sayaka Nakane	
"Holy War"	2019	Sayaka Nakane	
"Introduction"	2019	Sayaka Nakane	
"BL"	2020	Sayaka Nakane	
"Pride"	2020	Eri Yoshikawa	
"Violence" (バイオレンス)	2022	Sayaka Nakane	
"Mephisto"	2023	Sayaka Nakane	
"Super Memorial"	2024	Sayaka Nakane	

== Bibliography ==
- Queen Bee (2019). QB Zukan qb図鑑. Wani Books. ISBN 978-4847082016.
- Queen Bee (2024). QB Zukan II qb図鑑II. Wani Books. ISBN 978-4-8470-8537-6.

== Acting performances ==
- Moteki (モテキ, Moteki; 2011)

The band appear as themselves.

- Rocky Horror Show (ロッキー・ホラー・ショー, Rokkī Horā Shō; November–December 2017 Parco Stage production directed by Masahiko Kawahara)

Avu-chan played Columbia and the other band members played in the ensemble.
