= Sailor Star Song =

1996 single by Kae Hanazawa

Single by Kae Hanazawa
- Language: Japanese
- A-side: "Sailor Star Song"
- B-side: "A Better Morning will Come"
- Released: April 20, 1996
- Genre: J-pop; Anime song
- Length: 3:53
- Label: Nippon Columbia
- Composers: Masaki Araki; Kiyōka Chiho ("A Better Morning will Come")
- Lyricists: Naoko Takeuchi; Yuhiro Nakata ("A Better Morning will Come")

"Sailor Star Song" (Japanese: セーラースターソング, Hepburn: Sērā Sutā Songu) is a single by Japanese singer Kae Hanazawa. It served as an opening theme song for the fifth and final season of the Sailor Moon anime series, Sailor Moon Sailor Stars. The song is written by original creator and mangaka Naoko Takeuchi, composed by Masaki Araki, and arranged by Hal. The single was released on April 20, 1996, alongside "A Better Morning will Come" (もっとすてきな朝がくるよ, Motto sutekina asa ga kuru yo).

== Track listing ==
1. "Sailor Star Song" – Kae Hanazawa (3:51)
  - Lyrics: Naoko Takeuchi, Composition: Masaki Araki, Arrangement: Hal
2. "A Better Morning will Come" – Kae Hanazawa (4:12)
  - Lyrics: Yuhiro Nakata, Composition: Kiyōka Chiho, Arrangement: Hal
3. "Sailor Star Song" (Instrumental) (3:51)
4. "A Better Morning will Come" (Instrumental) (4:12)

== Other versions ==
- Hong Kong singer Michelle Hui provided a Cantonese version of the song for the Hong Kong version of the anime in 1998.
- Japanese voice actress and singer Mitsuko Horie provided a version of the song for the Sailor Moon 20th Anniversary Memorial Tribute Album in 2014.
- Japanese all-female band Silent Siren provided their version of the song for the Sailor Moon 25th Anniversary Memorial Tribute Album in 2018.
- Japanese voice actresses: Nana Mizuki, Marina Inoue, Saori Hayami and Ayane Sakura (as Sailor Kakyuu and Sailor Starlights respectively) provided their version of the song for the opening of the second film of Sailor Moon Cosmos two-part film in 2023. Cosmos version of the song peaked number 87 in the component Billboard Download Songs.

== Reception ==
The song ranked number 5 out of top 30 in the official NHK "Sailor Moon" voting special.
