= Friction (band) =

Japanese rock band

- Origin: Japan
- Genres: Punk rock
- Years active: 1978–1996, 2006–present
- Members: Reck; Tatsuya Nakamura
- Website: friction-officialsite.com

Friction (Japanese: フリクション, Hepburn: Frikushon) is a Japanese rock band formed in 1978. They originally began in 1971 under the name Maru Sankaku Shikaku (○△□（まるさんかくしかく）), and are considered to be one of the pioneers of Japan's alternative rock scene. The group ended activities in 1996, but original member Reck reformed Friction in 2006 as a duo with drummer Tatsuya Nakamura.

In September 2007, Rolling Stone Japan rated their debut album Atsureki at #21 on its list of the "100 Greatest Japanese Rock Albums of All Time".

== History ==
Originally formed in 1971 as an avant-garde music group by bassist Reck, saxophonist Chico Hige, and drummer Sakuro Watanabe in Tokyo, Japan. They changed the band's name to 3/3 in the mid 70s, and Reck and Chico later moved to the United States, where they would form the band Teenage Jesus and the Jerks with Lydia Lunch and James Chance, and later became the original founding members of James Chance and the Contortions before returning to Japan.

Renaming 3/3 to form Friction, they recruited guitarist Tsunematsu Masatoshi, who had studied art at the Tokyo National University of Fine Arts & Music. They released a live album and single in 1979, and their first studio album, Atsureki (軋轢, meaning 'friction' in Japanese) in 1980, produced by Ryuichi Sakamoto. Tsunematsu left the band in December 1980 to become a solo and visual artist. From then on, Friction has had numerous guest instrumentalists for live performances and studio releases, all revolving around frontman Reck. The live video titled Dumb Numb was directed by Sogo Ishii. Friction went on hiatus in 1999 when Reck started producing for other musicians. In 2006, the group was reformed as a duo featuring Reck and drummer Tatsuya Nakamura.

== Discography ==
- Atsureki (1980)
- Skin Deep (1982)
- Live at "Ex Mattatoio" in Roma (1985)
- Replicant Walk (1988)
- Dumb Numb CD (1990)
- Zone Tripper (1995)
- Remixxx+One (1996)
- Live 1980 (1996)
- Best (2007)
- Friction 1978-2008 (2008)
- Deepers (2009)
- 2013 - Live Friction (2010)
