= Spooky Romantics =

Japanese television series

Japanese name
- Kanji: 怪奇恋愛作戦
- Literal meaning: Spooky romance operation
Transcriptions
- Revised Hepburn: Kaiki Ren'ai Sakusen
- Genre: Comedy
- Written by: Keralino Sandrovich
- Directed by: Keralino Sandrovich; Kazuya Shiraishi (eps. 5, 6)
- Starring: Kumiko Asō; Maki Sakai; Tamaki Ogawa; Tōru Nakamura
- Opening theme: "Venus" by Queen Bee
- Ending theme: "Fallin' Down" by Denki Groove
- Composer: Keiichi Suzuki
- Country of origin: Japan
- Original language: Japanese
- No. of seasons: 1
- No. of episodes: 12

Production
- Production companies: TV Tokyo; Rakueisha

Original release
- Network: TV Tokyo; BS TV Tokyo
- Release: January 9 – March 28, 2015

Spooky Romantics (怪奇恋愛作戦, Kaiki Ren'ai Sakusen; literally "Spooky romance operation", stylized as SPOOKY ROMANTICS) is a Japanese comedy television drama series broadcast on TV Tokyo. It premiered on January 9, 2015 and ended on March 28, 2015.

== Cast ==
- Kumiko Asō
- Maki Sakai
- Tamaki Ogawa
- Tōru Nakamura
