= Mariko Gotō =

Japanese singer, lyricist, composer and actress (born 1982)

- Born: February 22, 1982 (age 44); Izumiōtsu, Osaka, Japan
- Genres: Art punk; punk jazz; noise pop
- Occupations: Musician; actress
- Instruments: Vocals; guitar
- Years active: 2001–2016, 2018–present
- Labels: DefStar; Evil Line

Mariko Gotō (後藤 まりこ, Gotō Mariko) (born February 22, 1982, in Izumiōtsu, Osaka) is a Japanese singer, lyricist, composer and actress.

Little is known about Gotō‘s early years and formative influences. Gotō is not a Japanese idol. The media often categorizes Gotō as an "alt-idol," which does not accurately describe her past and current projects.

Gotō’s first band was dubbed "Osaka's Twisted Judy and Mary," highlighting the influence of the older, established Japanese punk group, Judy and Mary on her music.

In 2001 she formed the noise rock and punk band Usagi (うさぎ) with three friends from Osaka. She sang and played guitar. After Usagi broke up in 2003, she formed the punk jazz group Midori together with Usagi's bassist, Yoshifumi Kuwano.

Midori released three full-length albums, five EPs, and a single. After its dissolution, Gotō focused on her solo career as a musician, as well as a stage, film, and television drama actress.

In 2013, she wrote the lyrics for and sang the opening song of the anime Flowers of Evil which is titled "宇宙人" (ep. 4–6, "Aku no Hana -Nakamura Sawa-"). Her song "Sound of Me" was used as the ending theme of the drama Taberudake, where she played the lead role.

In May 2016, it was reported that she decided to quit the music industry.

She returned under the alias DJ510Mariko on December 24, 2018 with an EP, DEMO. On December 11, 2019 she released her 1st album "Loved by Gainsborough" on her label "nixzm."

Gotō also performs and records as a solo "band", GotoMariko acoustic violence POP (後藤まりこアコースティックviolence POP).

== Discography ==
=== Solo Albums ===
- 299792458 (2012)
- m@u (2013)
- こわれた箱にりなっくす (2014)

=== Solo Singles ===
- "Sound of Me" (2013)
- "Love and Beast" (2023)

=== As DJ510Mariko ===
- DEMO (EP 2018)
- Loved by Gainsbourg (2019)
- love punk (EP 2020)
- fuckin' kill you (EP 2021)

=== As GotoMariko acoustic violence POP ===
- POP (2020)
- 未来 (2024)

=== With Midori ===
- ファースト (2005)
- セカンド ♥ (2007)
- 清水 (2007)
- あらためまして、はじめまして、ミドリです (2008)
- Swing (2009)
- Shinsekai (2010)

=== With Usagi ===
- Akemi-san to Midori-san (アケミさんとミドリさん) (EP, 2003)

== Acting ==
- Hedwig and the Angry Inch (2012)
- Petal Dance (2013)
- Taberu Dake (2013)
- Bold as You (2025)
