= Blankey Jet City =

Japanese rock band

- Also known as: BJC; Blankey (ブランキー, Burankī)
- Origin: Aichi Prefecture, Japan
- Genres: Rock and roll; rockabilly; alternative rock; punk rock
- Years active: 1987–2000
- Labels: Toshiba EMI (1990–1997); Polydor (1997–2000)
- Past members: Kenichi Asai: Toshiyuki Terui; Tatsuya Nakamura
- Website: Official website

Blankey Jet City was a Japanese rock trio from Aichi Prefecture, active from 1987 to 2000. It consisted of Kenichi Asai on vocals and guitar, Toshiyuki Terui on bass, and Tatsuya Nakamura on drums.

== History ==
Blankey Jet City was formed in 1987, in Aichi Prefecture, Japan. Their career then officially started in 1990, when they appeared on a popular TBS television show for amateur bands that August. Their performances attracted the attention of the major record labels, and the band then decided to sign a record contract with Toshiba EMI, who sent the band to London to record their first album. Released in 1991, their memorable debut album "Red Guitar And The Truth" focused on topics such as juvenile delinquency, broken families, and the pain experienced by neglected children. Fashion designer Yohji Yamamoto, used the album to promote his 1991 Paris collection.

The band embarked on their first nationwide tour and released their second album "Bang!" in 1992, which received numerous album of the year awards by music publications. Blankey Jet City gained a reputation for shows that highlighted their raw, emotional sound, and the label duly brought out a live album in the same year.

Their third album, C.B. Jim, was released in 1993, they again received acclaim from critics, when each song on the album was about the same fictitious person. Enjoying success, they released their fourth album "Metal Moon" during the same year, and quickly followed in 1994 with the release of their fifth album, which was more Jazz orientated than previous titles. Deciding the next step was to compile a selection of singles and re-recordings, they released a compilation titled "The Six" in 1995, and followed up with the album "Skunk" eight months later.

Taking a break from Blankey Jet City, Asai started his own indie label "Sexy Stone Records" in 1996, and formed the dream pop band "Sherbets" at the same time. Meanwhile, Nakamura started his own band "Losalios" with members from Tokyo Ska Paradise Orchestra. After extended disagreements with Toshiba EMI, Blankey Jet City left the label and signed with Polydor to release their new surf-rock sounding album "Love Flash Fever" in 1997.

In 1998, another compilation was released, along with their eighth album "Romeo's Heart" (ロメオの心臓). After four more hit singles, they released their final studio album "Harlem Jets" in May, 2000, followed by their swan-song "Saturday Night" within the next month. Their final live performance was at the Fuji Rock Festival on July 28, 2000, with the announcement that they wish to pursue indie careers.

== Members ==
Kenichi Asai (浅井 健一, Asai Ken'ichi) (born December 29, 1964) vocals, guitar

- He also plays in Sherbets and Jude and was a part of Ajico. He has furthermore released multiple albums under his own name.

Toshiyuki Terui (照井 利幸, Terui Toshiyuki) (born February 28, 1964) bass

- He belonged to Rosso, Raven (Tatsuya Nakamura, Chiba Yusuke, etc.) and so on.

Tatsuya Nakamura (中村 達也, Nakamura Tatsuya) (born January 4, 1965) drums

- He also played with The Stalin, Losalios (Takashi Kato, Tokie, and Shinji Takeda), Twin Tail (Toshiyuki Terui, Yuji Katsui) and so on.

== Discography ==
=== Singles ===
- "Huryō Shōnen no Uta (不良少年のうた)" (12 January 1991)
- "Texas" (5 July 1991)
- "Fuyu no Sweater (冬のセーター)" (11 December 1991)
- "Warui Hitotachi (悪いひとたち)" (9 November 1992)
- "Aoi Hana (青い花)" (20 April 1994)
- "Kaze ni Narumade (風になるまで)" (7 September 1994)
- "Girl/Jiyū (Girl/自由)" (25 January 1995)
- "Kuchizuke (くちづけ)" (25 October 1995)
- "Gasoline no Yurekata (ガソリンの揺れかた)" (28 May 1997)
- "Hidarikiki no Baby (左ききのBaby)" (3 September 1997)
- "Akai Tambourine (赤いタンバリン)" (21 January 1998)
- "Chiisana Koi no Melody (小さな恋のメロディ)" (10 June 1998)
- "Dandelion" (26 August 1998)
- "Sweet Days" (18 November 1998)
- "Pepin" (2 June 1999)
- "Sea Side Jet City" (12 April 2000)
- "Saturday Night" (5 July 2000)

=== Albums ===
- Red Guitar and the Truth (12 April 1991)
- Bang! (22 January 1992)
- Live!!! (30 September 1992)
- C.B. Jim (24 February 1993)
- Metal Moon (1 December 1993)
- Shiawase no Kane ga Narihibiki: Boku wa Tada Kanashii Furi o Suru (幸せの鐘が鳴り響き 僕はただ悲しい振りをする) (25 May 1994)
- The Six (1 March 1995)
- Skunk (22 November 1995)
- Love Flash Fever (18 June 1997)
- Kokkyōsenjō no Ari (国境線上の蟻) (21 January 1998)
- Romeo no Shinzō (ロメオの心臓) (24 June 1998)
- Harlem Jets (10 May 2000)
- Last Dance (20 September 2000)
- Blankey Jet City 1990-1995 (25 October 2000)
- Blankey Jet City 1997-2000 (25 October 2000)

=== Video ===
- Dog Food (22 April 1992)
- Monkey Strip (28 September 1994)
- Are You Happy? (13 December 1995)
- Blankey Jet City Solo Works (28 August 1995)
- Babyface President (7 October 1998)
- Barracuda: Tokyo Six Days (2 December 1998)
- Solo Works II (10 November 1999)
- Candy or Hell (26 July 2000)
- Last Dance (20 September 2000)

=== DVD ===
- Last Dance (20 September 2000)
- Dog Food (27 March 2002)
- Are You Happy? (27 March 2002)
- Solo Works (27 March 2002)
- Angel Fish Complete edition (16 May 2002)
- Monkey Strip (16 May 2002)
- Clips (16 May 2002)
- Barracuda: Tokyo Six Days (16 May 2002)
- Solo Works II (16 May 2002)
