= Kenta Izuka =

Japanese actor (born 1986)

- 猪塚 健太
- Born: 8 October 1986 (age 39); Seto, Aichi
- Occupation: Actor
- Years active: 2006–present
- Agent: Amuse, Inc.
- Website: Official Profile- Amuse, Inc.(in Japanese)

Kenta Izuka (猪塚 健太, Izuka Kenta; born 8 October 1986) is a Japanese actor and television personality associated with Amuse Inc. He is known for roles in Musical: The Prince of Tennis, Kyō Kara Ore Wa!!, and Shônen/Call Boy (2018), the television adaptation of Pornographer (2018)

== Career ==
Izuka debuted in 2006. He had his first lead role, Hikaru Todoroki in Tomica Hero: Rescue Force in 2008. He was a member of the theatre troupe, Gekidan Prestage (劇団プレステージ), managed by Amuse Inc. until 2019. In 2016, he was cast as Azuma Hirado in a theatrical adaptation of novel Shônen by Ira Ishida. Later, in 2018, he was awarded the same role in the movie adaptation with the same title. Consequently, he was cast as Haruhiko Kuzumi in a live-action series adaptation of Pornographer, a BL manga created by Maki Marukido, first released on the FOD streaming platform by Fuji Television. Due to the success of the TV drama Pornographer~Playback, Kyō Kara Ore Wa!! and Shônen, he has been receiving increased attention.

Izuka wanted to become an announcer at first, instead of an actor. In the end of year 2022 Izuka held the post of the MC, together with Taisuke Niihara for the fan event "SUPER HANDSOME LIVE 2022".

== Filmography ==
=== TV series ===
Year	Title	Role	Notes	Ref
2006	Kaikan Shokunin			
2007	Keitai Shoujo	Hayato Tsutsumi		
2008	Tomica Hero: Rescue Force	Hikaru Todoroki/R1	Lead	
2009	Tomica Hero: Rescue Fire	Hikaru Todoroki/R1	Guest	
2011	Onmitsu Happyaku Yachou	Somesaburo	Episodes 5	
2011	Yūsha Yoshihiko	Green Dungeon Running Team	Episodes 8	
2011	The Reason I Can't Find My Love		Episodes 1	
2011	Nazotoki wa Dinner no Ato de		Episodes 1	
2012	Shiritsu Bakaleya Koukou		Episodes 8	
2012	Piece		Episodes 1	
2013	Tonbi		Episodes 7	
2014	Dousousei – Hito Wa Sando Koi Wo Suru	Makoto		
2014	Midnight Diner		Episodes 9	
2015	Heat		Episodes 6	
2015	Kono Mystery ga Sugoi!	Yu Hanatsuka		
2017	Tokyo Tarareba Girls	BUMKEY's Lead Singer	Episodes 2,7	
2017	Minshu no Teki	Ono Yuki	Episodes 5,9	
2018	Pornographer	Haruhiko Kuzumi	Lead	
2018	From Today, It's My Turn!!	Teacher Mizutani		
2019	Mood Indigo	Haruhiko Kuzumi	Episodes 6	
2019	Shitsuji Saionji no Meisuiri 2	Shizukuishi Kotaro	Episodes 5	
2019	Jigoku no Girlfriend	Shikatani		
2019	Saunerman	Hajime Todo	Guest	
2020	Nogizaka Cinemas: STORY of 46	Tetchan	Episode 4	
2021	Surrogacy	Keito Mizuno		
2021	Takane no Hana-san	Genki Sarada		
2021	Tokyo MER: Mobile Emergency Room	Daichi Meguro		
2021	Keishichou Hikikomori-Gakari	Keisuke Mizusawa		
2021	The Words They Speak	Ren Kirishima	Episode 1, 1.5	
2021	Rinko-san wa Shite Mitai	Yo-ichi Hiyama		
2021	The Night I Became a Beast	Sanada	Season 2, Episode 6	
2022	A Man Who Defies the World of BL	Igarashi	Season 2	
2022	A City I Don't Know at All	Kai (hair stylist)	Season 2, Episode 2 (Daikanyama)	
2022	Tonight, My Body Will Fall in Love	Oonuma Ryosuke		
2022	Takane no Hana-san : Season 2	Genki Sarada		
2022	Candy Color Paradox MBS Drama Shower	Inami Kei		
2023	Tonight, My Body Will Fall in Love : Season 2	Oonuma Ryosuke		
2023	Watashi ga Himo wo Kau Nante	Okumura Ryo		
2023	Goritekini Arienai : Tantei Kamizuru Ryoko no Kaimei	Hirose Liam	Episode 2	
2023	Manten no Goal (TV Drama Special)	Uchida Hiroyuki		
2023	Inu to Kuzu	Ebihara Takumi	Episode 7	
2023	Halation Love	Kaga Takayuki		
2023	Zeicho : There is a reason why they say "I can't pay"	Saginuma Hiroki		
2023	When you start "nurturing". ～How to spend your precious time～	Tamura Yuji		
2025	Dr. Ashura	Takumi Kichijōji		
2026	Brothers in Arms	Takigawa Kazumasu	Taiga drama	

=== Films ===
Year	Title	Role	Notes	Ref
2008	Tomica Hero: Rescue Force Explosive Movie: Rescue the Mach Train!	Hikaru Todoroki/R1	Lead	
2010	The Lady Shogun and Her Men			
2015	Midnight Diner			
2017	The Disastrous Life of Saiki K.	Dark Reunion		
2018	Call Boy	Azuma Hirado		
2020	From Today, It's My Turn!! The Movie	Teacher Mizutani		
2021	Pornographer the Movie: Playback	Haruhiko Kuzumi	Lead	
2022	Tsurumi's "Merry Bad End" Course	Teacher Kunikita	Short film	
2022	The Way of the Househusband: The Cinema	Yamamoto		
2022	Violence Action	Kura		
2023	Tokyo MER: Mobile Emergency Room – The Movie	Daichi Meguro		
2023	The Forbidden Play	Kuniaki Kurosaki		
2023	The Ex-idol, Stuck in Life, Decided to Live with a Complete Stranger	Kousuke		
2024	Stolen Identity: Final Hacking Game	Akira Nagase		
2026	Grim Reaper Barber	Takashi		
2026	Kingdom 5: The Clash of Souls	Song Zuo		

=== Theatre ===
Year	Title	Role	Notes	Ref
2010	Reset 3.2.1 ...	Haruki Hanazawa	Lead	
2010	Byakkotai The Idol	Storyteller		
2010	Midnight Interrogation Room	Daisuke Funamura		
2011	Musical: The Prince of Tennis	Yoshiro Akazawa		
2012	Monster box	Satoru Endo		
2012	Spiritual day	Jibakurei		
2014	Chikyuu Gorgeous Produce Kouen Vol.13 Kuzariana No Tsubasa			
2014	Satomi Hakkenden	Samojirou Aboshi		
2016	Chikyu Gorgeous Produce Kouen Vol.14 The Love Bugs	Garashi		
2016	Boku to aitsu no Sekigahara/ Ore to omae no Natsu no Jin	Ishida Mitsunari/ Tokugawa Ieyasu/ Toyotomi Hideyoshi		
2016	Shônen(Call boy)	Azuma Hirado		
2016	Chin Uzu Mushi	Tagiri Kageyama		
2017	Over Ring Gift	Aster		
2017	Small Room	Tezuka		
2018	Bloody Poetry	Percy Bysshe Shelley	Lead	
2018	Reading Drama : Sister	Brother		
2018	Makai Tenshō	Araki Mataemon		
2019	Wait Until Dark	Croker		
2019	FACTORY GIRLS	Benjamin		
2020	Chikyu Gorgeous Produce Hoshi no Daichi ni Furu Namida THE MUSICAL	Shiriri		
2020	Ore to omae no Natsu no Jin	Toyotomi Hideyoshi/ Tokugawa Ieyasu		
2020	Defiled	Harry Mendelson		
2020	Musical Rurouni Kenshin	Sadojima Hōji	cancelled due to COVID-19	
2021	Murder Mystery Theatre	Umezaki Ayumu		
2021	The Eraser in My Head 12th Letter	Kousuke	it was later switch to online streaming due to COVID-19	
2022	The Bodyguard Musical	Sy Spector		
2022	Musical Rurouni Kenshin	Sadojima Hoji		
2023	Shūgaku (School Trip) Readers Theatre			

=== Audio dramas ===
Year	Title	Role	Notes	Ref
2021	The Melody in the Dream	Shōno Akito	Horror Audio Story	
2022	NHK FM – Omokage (Remnants)	Mikumo		
2023	ZANGE (Repentance)	Akutsu Sho		

=== TV Variety Shows ===
Year	Title	Notes	Ref
2023	Night Brunch		
2023	1HR Sense		

=== Video-On-Demand dramas ===
Year	Title	Role	Notes	Ref
2022	dTV Original Drama Usogui: Kurama Ranko-Hen	Shibata		
2022	ANIMALS	Daigo Satoru		
2023	Stand-UP Start Spin-off : Night Worker	Kazu	Episode 5.5	
2023	U-Next Original Drama : MALICE	Kijima Shinichi		

=== Music Videos ===
Year	Song	Singer
2007	"September Soda" (9月のソーダ)	Peridots
2009	"Don't say anything-the last confession"(何も言えずに〜最後の告白〜)	ASIAENGINEER
2011	"Shine"	WEAVER
2017	"Bed Sitting Room"(ベッド・シッティング・ルーム)	Uchu Mao
2018	"Day Off"(休みの日)	Uchu Mao

=== Events ===
Year	Events	Ref
2022	Act Against Anything VOL.2 (2022.11.26)	
2022	Handsome Live 2022 – Rock You! Rock Me! (2022.11.29 – 30)	
2023	After Handsome Cinema Tour "Show You! Show Me!"	
2023	SUPER HANDSOME LIVE 2022 "ROCK YOU! ROCK ME!!" 3xLive Screens	
2023	Izuka Kenta 1st Event ～2023 Year-end party～	
2024	SUPER HANDSOME LIVE 2024 "WE AHHHHH！"	

=== Commercial ===
Year	
2007	Mitsuya Cider
2007	AOKI Holdings Inc.
2007	mobaito
2007	Hiroshima Institute of Technology
2008	Lady Borden
2008	Kao Success
2012	NEC LaVie L
2012	Smirnoff (Web CM)
2012	READOLE
2017	Hino Profia
2021	Nylon Smooth Skin "Pure Fit" (Web CM)
2022	Bandai Namco Entertainment Dragon Ballz Dokkan-Battle CM
2022	Square Enix Dragon Quest X (Web CM)
2022	Dr. Zero "Power of Science" Hair Shampoo

=== Radio(Web) ===
Year	Title	Role	Notes	Ref
2022	stand.fm	MC		

=== Magazines ===
Regular appearance(interviews) in magazines published by Shinko Music Entertainment from year 2016–present.

=== Books ===
Year	Title	Publisher	Ref
2021	First Personal Book: awesome! Special Edition 猪塚健太「title: Special Thanks」	Shinko Music Entertainment Co. Ltd (awesome magazine department)	
