= Ryōsuke Sota =

Japanese actor and model (born 1997)

Ryosuke Sota
- Born: October 24, 1997 (age 28); Shimane Prefecture, Japan
- Education: Hiroshima Institute of Technology
- Occupations: Actor; model
- Years active: 2018–present
- Agent: MR8
- Height: 170 cm (5 ft 7 in)

Japanese name
- Kanji: 曽田 陵介
- Hiragana: そた りょうすけ
Transcriptions
- Romanization: Sota Ryōsuke
- Website: sota-ryousuke.com

Ryōsuke Sota (曽田 陵介, Sota Ryōsuke; born October 24, 1997) is a Japanese actor and model.

== Career ==
Sota enrolled in the Hiroshima Institute of Technology in April 2016. During his second year, he entered the university's "Mr. Con".

On July 5, 2018, he started posting on his TikTok account and attracted much attention. His first post was an imitation of Kento Yamazaki's movie Wolf Girl and Black Prince; after posting, he thought nothing much of it. Sota later learned from his sister that it had gone viral on TikTok. In that same year, he was scouted by Arrows Entertainment and later entered the entertainment industry.

He appeared on Abema TV's reality television show Don't be Fooled by the Moon and the Wolf Girl on January 5, 2020. Because of his amazing on-screen chemistry with model Riko, they were dubbed "Sotariko" by the audience and quickly became popular among both them and the program's MCs. After He appeared in the show his Instagram gained many followers. Since the viewers of the program were mainly adolescent girls in high school, the catchphrase was "99.9% known among teenage girls.".

In March 2020, He graduated from University. In the same month, Sota appeared regularly on the information variety show Neko no Hitai Hodo Wide and departed in March 2022. In April of the same year, he starred in his first TV drama Mr. Unlucky Has No Choice But to Kiss!.

On October 3, 2022, He released his official website and fan club "Ryosuke Sota Official Site".

== Personal life ==
Ryōsuke Sota was born on October 24, 1997, in Shimane Prefecture, Japan. His family consists of his mother, father and an older sister. He cites actor Shun Oguri as the actor he looks up to as he was inspired to pursue acting after being captivated by Oguri's acting abilities.

== Filmography ==
=== Film ===
Year	Title	Role	Notes	Ref.
2021	Horimiya: The Movie	Shū Iura		
2022	Grand Guignol	Kento Amagami		
2023	Our Secret Diary	Haruhito Yoneda		
2025	Love Song from Hiroshima	Mocchi	Lead role	
2025	Who Cares?: The Movie	Sato		
2025	Wind Breaker	Kota Sako		
2026	Burn	Makoto Tsurukawa, AKA Wris		

=== Television drama ===
Year	Title	Role	Notes	Ref.
2020	Uncle Likes Cute Things	Rio Shigenobu's favorite idol		
2021	Horimiya	Shū Iura	Episodes 1, 2, 5, and 13	
2021	Can I Follow You Home?: The Drama	Yamanaka		
2021	Oshaka Sommelier Oshako!	Buzz Lee	Season 2	
2021	Sweet Revenge	Hayato	Episode 12	
2022	Resident Detective	Masamichi Kido	Season 3; episode 3	
2022	Rokuhōdō Yotsuiro Biyori	Ryuji	Episode 6 and final	
2022	Murai in Love	Hirai		
2022	Mr. Unlucky Has No Choice But to Kiss!	Kōta Fukuhara	Lead role	
2022	Tokyo Metropolitan Police Department: First Investigation Division Chief	Katsuya Kataishi	Season 6; episode 6	
2022	Ideal Boyfriend	Mari Hirai	Episode 1	
2022	Rent-A-Girlfriend	Umi Nakano	Episode 7	
2022	Sawako: Endless Revenge	Kensuke Otokawa		
2023	Why Didn't I Tell You a Million Times?	Kento Hashimoto	Episode 1	
2023	Unknown	Daigoro Igarashi		
2023	Around ¼	Kazuma Miyashita		
2023	The Expert of Changing Jobs	Shusuke Ayano	Episode 4	
2023	Trillion Game	Himuro	Episodes 6 and 7	
2023	Hideyoshi Works at a Startup Company	Ren Maeda	Lead role	
2023	My Lawyer is a Handful	Shugo Goda	Episode 2	
2023–24	Blue Spring Ride	Kikuchi Touma	2 seasons	
2024	Destiny	Takuya Kaji		
2024	The Guys Who Illuminate the Streets	Shun		
2024	Laughing Matryoshka	Naoki Aoyama		
2024	Snowdrop's First Love	Kazuma Ise		
2024	Minou R	Naoki Kinoshita	Episode 2	
2025	Unsung Heroes	Rui Katano		
2025	Oppan	Shudai Sato		
2025	Captured Broadcasting Station	Amakusa Itsuki		
2025	Murder of My Favorite Idol	Naoya Mochizuki		
2026	The Faceless Patient: Should We Save or Judge?	Taro Hagita		
2026	Convenience Store Brothers: Tenderness Mojiko Kogane Village Store	Takagi Rento		
2026	Moonlit Journey: The Answer Lies in Masterpieces	Jun Ikematsu	Episode 9 and 10	
2026	I Killed My Husband	Itsuki Hatano		

== Awards and nominations ==
Year presented, name of the award ceremony, category, nominee(s) of the award, and the result of the nomination
Year	Award ceremony	Category	Nominated work(s)	Result	Ref.
2025	Film Invasion Los Angeles	Best Actor	Love Song from Hiroshima	Won	

== Bibliography ==
=== Photobook ===
- Ryosuke Sota's first photo book "sota" (October 21, 2022, Shufu to Seikatsusha) ISBN 9784391157666

=== Calendar ===
- RYOUSUKE SOTA 2024 CALENDAR (scheduled for March 27, 2024, Gentosha) ISBN 9784344042278
