= Akira Failing in Love =

Japanese manga series

- First tankōbon volume cover

百瀬アキラの初恋破綻中。 (Momose Akira no Hatsukoi Hatan-chū)
- Genre: Romantic comedy
- Manga
- Written by: Shinta Harekawa
- Published by: Shogakukan
- English publisher: NA: Viz Media
- Imprint: Shōnen Sunday Comics
- Magazine: Weekly Shōnen Sunday
- Original run: August 21, 2024 – present
- Volumes: 8
- icon

Akira Failing in Love (Japanese: 百瀬アキラの初恋破綻中。, Hepburn: Momose Akira no Hatsukoi Hatan-chū) is a Japanese manga series written and illustrated by Shinta Harekawa. It has been serialized in Shogakukan's shōnen manga magazine Weekly Shōnen Sunday since August 2024, with its chapters collected in eight tankōbon volumes as of September 2026.

== Plot ==
The series follows Hajime Kugayama, a first year high school student who lives in a small town of 5,000 people. He reunites with Akira Momose, his elementary classmate. He had feelings for her until she moved away during the 4th grade. Expecting to maintain a distant relationship in high school, he is surprised when she approaches him. As it turns out, Akira wants to gain his attention, despite her clumsiness.

== Characters ==
Hajime Kugayama (久我山 はじめ, Kugayama Hajime)
Voiced by: Reiji Kawashima (PV)
A high school student and Akira's classmate. He had a crush on Akira when they were young, but they lost contact after she moved away. He is surprised to be reunited with her in high school. He is oblivious towards her feelings for him.
Akira Momose (百瀬 アキラ, Momose Akira)
Voiced by: Aya Yamane (PV)
A high school student and Hajime's classmate. They were classmates in elementary school until she moved away during the 4th grade. She moves back to town, aiming to start a relationship with Hajime. However, her clumsy nature makes this a challenge.
Rendaiji (蓮台寺)
Hajime's best friend who often gives him the wrong advice based on his experience with visual novels. For some reason, he cannot look girls directly in their eyes.
Tsumugi Kintetsu (近鉄 つむぎ, Kintetsu Tsumugi) / Kin-chan (きんちゃん)
One of Akira's few friends, who is a very calm and friendly person.
Mei Kibu (鬼舞 めい, Kibu Mei) / Mei-Mei (めいめい)
One of Akira's few friends with a kind of foul mouth. She and Tsumugi are very supportive of Akira and her attempted actions towards Hajime.
Mone Kajiyashiki (梶屋敷 もね, Kajiyashiki Mone) / Captain (部長, Buchō)
The captain of the track club. She is charismatic but gets flustered by romantic matters.

== Publication ==
Written and illustrated by Shinta Harekawa, Akira Failing in Love started in Shogakukan's shōnen manga magazine Weekly Shōnen Sunday on August 21, 2024. Shogakukan has collected its chapters into individual tankōbon volumes, with the first one released on December 18, 2024; an animated promotional video was released on YouTube to promote the volume's release. As of September 2026, eight volumes have been released.

The series is licensed for English release in North America by Viz Media, with the first volume released in March 2026.

=== Volumes ===
No.	Original release date	Original ISBN	English release date	English ISBN
1	December 18, 2024	978-4-09-853684-9	March 10, 2026	978-1-9747-6250-7
1. "Approaching the Angel" (天使と接近中。, Tenshi to Sekkin-chū); 2. "Messing up Everything" (すべてを間違え中。, Subete o Machigae-chū); 3. "Rushing Headlong" (まっすぐ先走り中。, Massugu Sakibashiri-chū); 4. "Stoically Measuring Strength" (ストイックに体力測定中。, Sutoikku ni Tairyoku Sokutei-chū); 5. "Baking Sweets Filled with Love" (LOVE(ラブ)全開でお菓子作り中。, Rabu Zenkai de Okashizukuri-chū); 6. "Taking Superhard Classes" (超難易度の授業中。, Chō Nan'ido no Jugyōchū); 7. "Ad-Libbing like Crazy at the Beach" (海辺でアドリブ奔走中。, Umibe de Adoribu Honsō-chū); 8. "Competing with a Burning Soul" (魂燃やして競技中。, Tamashii Moyashite Kyōgi-chū); 9. "Jumping with Feeling" (想い、跳躍中。, Omoi, Chōyaku-chū); 10. "Aching in One's Chest" (疼く、胸中。, Uzuku, Kyōchū)
2	March 18, 2025	978-4-09-854027-3	May 12, 2026	978-1-9747-6320-7
11. "Getting Flustered at Zero Distance" (ゼロ距離でわたわた中。, Zero Kyori de Watawata-chū); 12. "Writhing in Agony While Learning to Ride a Bicycle" (七転八倒チャリ練中。, Shichiten Battō Chariren-chū); 13. "Secretly Observing on the Way Home" (極秘の帰路を観察中。, Gokuhi no Kiro o Kansatsu-chū); 14. "Budding Friendship" (友情、芽生え中。, Yūjō, Mebae-chū); 15. "Going on a Mission in the Realm of Demons" (静かな魔境でミッション中。, Shizuka na Makyō de Misshon-chū); 16. "Good Intentions Running Wild" (BIG(ビッグ)な善意が暴走中。, Biggu na Zen'i ga Bōsō-chū); 17. "Fantasizing About an Imaginary Future" (架空の未来を妄想中。, Kakū no Mirai o Mōsō-chū); 18. "Dancing to Your Own Rhythm" (独自のリズムでDANCE(ダンス)中。, Dokuji no Rizumu de Dansu-chū); 19. "Alone Together and Content" (2人きり、満喫中。, Futari-kiri, Mankitsu-chū); 20. "Absorbing Myself in You" (君に、夢中。, Kimi ni, Muchū)
3	June 18, 2025	978-4-09-854149-2	July 14, 2026	978-1-9747-6321-4
21. "Reflecting on the Very Surprising Thing that Happened" (まさかのアレを反省中。, Masaka no Are o Hansei-chū); 22. "Holding a Conference on Whether It Was an Accident or Not" (事故か事件か会見中。, Jiko ka Jiken ka Kaiken-chū); 23. "Preparing a Heartfelt Souvenir" (本気の土産を準備中。, Honki no Miyage o Junbi-chū); 24. "Dreaming of the Future" (ある日の彼女は画策中。, Aru Hi no Kanojo wa Kakusaku-chū); 25. "Teaming Up with a Passionate Team Captain" (熱めの部長に入門中。, Atsume no Buchō ni Nyūmon-chū); 26. "Consulting a Passionate Maiden" (熱めの乙女に相談中。, Atsume no Otome ni Sōdan-chū); 27. "A Maiden Encountering a Maiden" (乙女が乙女に遭遇中。, Otome ga Otome ni Sōgū-chū); 28. "Coming Face-to-Face with a Mother Bear" (物騒な母と対面中。, Bussō na Haha to Taimen-chū); 29. "Under One Roof While It's Raining" (一つ屋根の下、雨中。, Hitotsu Yane no Shita, Uchū); 30. "Arriving in the Dark" (辿り着いた、暗中。, Tadoritsuita, Anchū)
4	September 18, 2025	978-4-09-854237-6	September 8, 2026	978-1-9747-1662-3
Chapters 31–39
5	December 18, 2025	978-4-09-854376-2	November 10, 2026	978-1-9747-6912-4
40. "Lost In the Thick Fog Seeking the Truth of Midsummer" (真夏の真裏で五里霧中。, Manatsu no Maura de Gori Muchū); 41. "Taking Extra Lessons With the Class President" (クラスの長と補習中。, Kurasu no Chō to Hoshū-chū); 42. "Self-Mastery While Losing All Control" (克服ついでに無秩序中。, Kokufuku Tsuide ni Muchitsujo-chū); 43. "Battling It Out In a Big Building" (でっかい施設で決闘(デュエル)中。, Dekkai Shisetsu de Dyueru-chū); 44. "Pursuing a Snow-White Doggie" (まっしろワンワン追跡中。, Masshiro Wanwan Tsuiseki-chū); 45. "Changing Seats With a B-Bmp B-Bmp" (席替えときどきどきどき中。, Sekigae Tokidoki Dokidoki-chū); 46. "Trying Out Various Gyaru" (多様なキャルを検証中。, Tayō na Gyaru o Kenshō-chū); 47. "Worrying Over News of Sickness" (病の便りに迷い中。, Yamai no Tayori ni Mayoi-chū); 48. "Swaying In the Late Summer Heat" (残暑の風にそよぎ中。, Zansho no Kaze ni Soyogi-chū)
6	March 18, 2026	978-4-09-854491-2	February 9, 2027	978-1-9747-7166-0
49. "Heating Up In Your Hands" (熱帯びる、掌中。, Netsu Obiru, Shōchū); 50. "Reminiscing About a Special Place" (ひとりの景色を回想中。, Hitori no Keshiki o Kaisō-chū); 51. "Racing Through Our Special Place" (ふたりの景色に快走中。, Futari no Keshiki ni Kaisō-chū); 52. "Luxuriating In a Firm Pudding" (硬めのプリンを満喫中。, Katame no Purin o Mankitsu-chū); 53. "Taking a Detour Over the Mountain at Sunset" (山越え夕暮れ寄り道中。, Yamagoe Yūgure Yorimichi-chū); 54. "Bustling Around a Seaside Hellscape" (海辺の魔境を疾走中。, Umibe no Makyō o Shissō-chū); 55. "Communication Offstage" (舞台の上下でざわめき中。, Butai no Jōge de Zawameki-chū); 56. "Getting Lost In a Chaotic Palace" (多色な魔宮を彷徨い中。, Tashoku na Makyū o Samayoi-chū); 57. "Rushing in with Big Feelings" (大きな気持ちで前進中。, Ōkina Kimochi de Zenshin-chū)
7	June 18, 2026	978-4-09-854654-1	June 8, 2027	978-1-9747-7243-8
58. "The Speaking-with-Your-Inner-Voice Club" (心の声で語り部中。, Kokoro no Koe de Kataribu-chū); 59. "Fighting a Lonely Battle as a Full-On Gyaru" (孤軍奮闘ガチギャル中。, Kogun Funtō Gachi Gyaru-chū); 60. "Wrapping It Up in a Flood of Feelings" (あふれる気持ちにくるまり中。, Afureru Kimochi ni Kurumari-chū); 61. "Feelings Hippety-Hopping Through the Rice Field" (田んぼで気持ちがぴょんぴょん中。, Tanbo de Kimochi ga Pyonpyon-chū); 62. "Romance and Regulations Colliding" (恋慕と法律(ルール)が衝突中。, Renbo to Rūru ga Shōtotsu-chū); 63. "Offering Help Along the Bumpy Road of Love" (でこぼこ恋路を手助け中。, Dekoboko Koiji o Tedasuke-chū); 64. "Encountering an Adult at Work" (バイトで大人に邂逅中。, Baito de Otona ni Kaikō-chū); 65. "Hiding in the Target Location" (標的(ねらい)の居場所に潜伏中。, Nerai no Ibasho ni Senpuku-chū); 66. "Taking the Plunge at the Railroad Crossing" (果敢な行為に踏み切り中。, Kakan na Kōi ni Fumikiri-chū)
8	September 16, 2026	978-4-09-854817-0	—	—
67. "Saving Money One Town Over" (隣の町にて節約中。, Tonari no Machi ni te Setsuyaku-chū); 68. "Trying on Each Outfit with Feeling" (一着入魂試着中。, Itchaku Nyūkon Shichaku-chū); 69. "Katanas and Emotions Battling It Out" (刀と想いと交戦中。, Katana to Omoi to Kōsen-chū); 70. "Hurling Simple Questions" (素朴な疑問を投げかけ中。, Soboku na Gimon o Nagekake-chū); 71. "Going Down Stairs to a Scary Story" (階段そののち怪談中。, Kaidan Sono nochi Kaidan-chū); 72. "Blowing Up One Day" (ある日の彼女は膨らみ中。, Aru Hi no Kanojo wa Fukurami-chū); 73. "Big Days Overlapping" (式日どうしが重なり中。, Shikijitsu Dōshi ga Kasanari-chū); 74. "Reflecting Along the Way" (想い馳せる、道中。, Omoi Haseru, Dōchū); 75. "Sharing Feelings in the Snow" (想い交う、雪中。, Omoi-kau, Setchū)
9	December 17, 2026	978-4-09-855029-6	—	—

=== Chapters not yet in tankōbon format ===
76. "Buddy-Buddying at Christmastime" (なかよく並んでクリスマ中。, Nakayoku Narande Kurisuma-chū)
77. "Hesitantly High-Fiving" (おずおず手のひら合わせ中。, Ozuozu Tenohira Awase-chū)
78. "Enjoying a Feast at the Palace" (御殿で豪華なご馳走中。, Goten de Gōka na Gochisō-chū)
79. "Ringing and Mumbling in the New Year" (もにょもにょシャカシャカ年越し中。, Monyomonyo Shakashaka Toshikoshi-chū)
80. "Luvvy-Luvvily Parading at the Bookstore" (書店でときめきパレード中。, Shoten de Tokimeki Parēdo-chū)
81. "Dynamically Gliding" (ダイナミックに滑走中。, Dainamikku ni Kassō-chū)
82. "Searching for a Lost Item in a Cold Land" (寒地で失せ物捜索中。, Kanchi de Usemono Sōsaku-chū)
83. "Discovering Important Proof" (大事な証を発見中。, Daiji na Akashi o Hakken-chū)
84. "Each One Savoring the Feeling" (おのおの感触確かめ中。, Ono'ono Kanshoku Tashikame-chū)
85. "Zooming Towards Their Fate" (運命、接近中。, Unmei, Sekkin-chū)
86. "Havin' a Fest, Fest, Festival!" (祭りだ祭りだお祭り中。, Matsuri da Matsuri da Omatsuri-chū)
87. "Getting Lost on a Straight Road" (一本道を迷走中。, Ipponmichi o Meisō-chū)
88. "Standing Still in Silence" (静寂のなかに佇み中。, Seijaku no Naka ni Tadazumi-chū)
89. "Indirectly Kissing in a Trance" (トランスついでに間接中。, Toransu Tsuide ni Kansetsu-chū)
90. "A Fever Exploding into the Night Sky" (熱が夜空に爆発中。, Netsu ga Yozora ni Bakuhatsu-chū)

== Reception ==
By September 2026, the manga had over one million copies in circulation worldwide. The series was nominated for the 2025 Next Manga Award in the print category, and was ranked sixth.

== See also ==
- Senpai, This Can't Be Love!, another manga series by the same author
- Three Exorcism Siblings, another manga series by the same author
