= Three Exorcism Siblings =

Japanese manga series

- First tankōbon volume cover

天狗祓の三兄弟 (Tengu Barai no San Kyōdai)
- Genre: Action; Dark fantasy; Mystery
- Manga
- Written by: Shinta Harekawa
- Published by: Coamix
- English publisher: NA: Titan Manga
- Magazine: Web Comic Zenyon
- Original run: October 22, 2021 – July 21, 2023
- Volumes: 7

Three Exorcism Siblings (Japanese: 天狗祓の三兄弟, Hepburn: Tengu Barai no San Kyōdai) is a Japanese manga series written and illustrated by Shinta Harekawa. It was serialized in Coamix's Web Comic Zenyon from October 2021 to July 2023, with its chapters collected in seven tankōbon volumes.

== Synopsis ==
Mamoru Yamaemori spends his days protecting his family shrine from tengu attacks. Mamoru also protects his younger brothers from tengu, hoping that they would never follow in his footsteps. Mamoru underwent a ritual that involved tengu blood, leading him and others to believe that he is cursed.

== Publication ==
Written and illustrated by Shinta Harekawa, Three Exorcism Siblings was serialized in Coamix's Web Comic Zenyon from October 22, 2021, to July 21, 2023. Coamix collected its chapters in seven tankōbon volumes, published from March 19, 2022, to September 20, 2023.

In September 2023, it was announced that Titan Manga had acquired the manga license for English release in North America. The first volume was released on April 16, 2024. The manga is published digitally in English under the title Three Exorcist Brothers by MangaHot.

=== Volumes ===
No.	Original release date	Original ISBN	English release date	English ISBN
1	March 19, 2022	978-4-86-720319-4	April 16, 2024	978-1-78774-137-9
2	June 20, 2022	978-4-86-720394-1	July 30, 2024	978-1-78774-138-6
3	September 20, 2022	978-4-86-720422-1	October 22, 2024	978-1-78774-139-3
4	December 20, 2022	978-4-86-720450-4	July 28, 2026	978-1-78774-947-4
5	March 20, 2023	978-4-86-720484-9	—	—
6	June 20, 2023	978-4-86-720517-4	—	—
7	September 20, 2023	978-4-86-720565-5	—	—

== See also ==
- Akira Failing in Love, another manga series by the same author
- Senpai, This Can't Be Love!, another manga series by the same author
