= Rikako Yagi =

Japanese model and actress (born 2001)

- Born: July 7, 2001 (age 25); Ōmihachiman, Shiga Prefecture, Japan
- Education: Omi Brotherhood Junior & Senior High School
- Alma mater: Meiji Gakuin University (Sociology)
- Occupations: Actress; model
- Years active: 2016–present
- Agent: Asia Cross
- Modeling information
- Height: 170 cm (5 ft 7 in)
- Hair color: black
- Eye color: brown

Japanese name
- Kanji: 八木 莉可子
- Hiragana: やぎ りかこ
Transcriptions
- Romanization: Yagi Rikakō

Rikako Yagi (八木 莉可子, Yagi Rikakō; born July 7, 2001), is a Japanese model and actress.

== Personal life and education ==
Yagi was born on July 7, 2001, in Ōmihachiman, Shiga Prefecture. Before moving to Tokyo in 2020 to attend university, she lived in her hometown of Shiga, where she balanced her studies with her acting and modeling career. She is skilled in rhythmic gymnastics after having practiced it for over six years during elementary school. Aside from rhythmic gymnastics, her other special skill is calligraphy, for which she has an eighth-degree rank.

Yagi shared the news of her graduation from Meiji Gakuin University on Instagram on April 9, 2024. She also disclosed that she had finished her graduation thesis, the concept was entitled Modern Society as Seen by Spider-Man.

== Career ==
In 2015, Yagi was selected as the grand prize winner among 7,851 applicants at the "Next Asia Cross Model Audition", the first large-scale model audition held by Asia Cross. She also won a contract with fashion magazine ViVi and multinational electronics company Panasonic.

On April 14, 2016, it was announced that she would be the brand model for Pocari Sweat by Otsuka Pharmaceutical. In July, she made her acting debut in the Saturday television drama The Girl Who Leapt Through Time on Nippon Television. In the same month, she was selected as a finalist in the "Miss Seventeen" contest for the August issue of Seventeen to which she was chosen as "Miss Seventeen 2016" becoming an exclusive model for the said magazine.

On May 24, 2017, she starred in the seventh episode of the drama &Bishoujo Next Girl Meets Tokyo, marking her first lead role in a television drama.

In March 2021, she "graduated" from being an exclusive model for Seventeen. On November 9 of the same year, she starred in her first terrestrial drama called Campus de Aiou!, which was broadcast to commemorate the 80th anniversary of the opening of the NHK Otsu Broadcasting Station. In the same month, she made her first film appearance in the movie Spaghetti Code Love.

On May 27, 2022, she released her first photo book, "pitter-patter," a special edition limited to 3,000 copies, which was shot over the course of three and a half years from the ages 17 to 20. Later, a photo exhibition including unpublished works was held on July first. On August 21, Yagi made her first appearance in the NHK taiga drama, The 13 Lords of the Shogun, as Kiku. On November 24 of the same year, she attracted much attention after portraying the heroine as a teen, played by Hikari Mitsushima, in the Netflix original drama First Love.

On February 8, 2023, she made her first appearance in NHK's asadora drama series, Maiagare!. On August 26 of the same year, she starred in the spin-off drama, The Summer Without Songs, based on the character she portrayed in Maiagare!.

In January 2024, she was appointed as the Japan brand ambassador for the French luxury fashion house Dior. She then appeared in Nippon Broadcasting System's 70th Anniversary celebration stage performance Kamogawa Horumo, Once More which was performed at the Sunshine theater on April 12. In October of the same year, she co-starred with Ryo Ryusei in the NTV Saturday drama Sibling Intrusion, her first lead role in a primetime drama series.

== Filmography ==
=== Film ===
| Year | Title | Role | Notes | Ref. |
|---|---|---|---|---|
| 2021 | Spaghetti Code Love | Kurosu Rin | | |
| 2022 | Homestay | Takasaki Mizuki | | |
| 2022 | Mr. Osomatsu | Haru | | |
| 2023 | Ichikei's Crow: The Movie | Megumi Sagara | | |
| 2024 | Doctor-X: The Movie | Young Michiko Daimon | | |
| 2025 | Ya Boy Kongming! The Movie | Kuon Nanami | | |
| 2025 | Mt. Fuji and Happiness Code | Saki Oishi | | |
| 2025 | Wind Breaker | Kotoha Tachibana | | |
| 2026 | Sukiyaki | Female student | | |

=== Television series ===
| Year | Title | Role | Notes | Ref. |
|---|---|---|---|---|
| 2016 | The Girl Who Leapt Through Time | Asami Onishi | | |
| 2017 | &Bishoujo Next Girl Meets Tokyo | Kanzaki Riko | Lead role; episode 7 | |
| 2017 | Fugitive Boys | Haru Masubuch | | |
| 2018 | We Are Rockets! | Yuki Yanagisawa | | |
| 2021 | Anonymous: Tokyo Metropolitan Police Department Countermeasures Room | Sanada Kozue | | |
| 2021 | One More | Shiho Yamazaki | | |
| 2021 | See You on Campus! | Minami Ishiyama | Lead role | |
| 2022 | The 13 Lords of the Shogun | Kiku | Taiga drama | |
| 2022 | Mugonkan | Yukie | | |
| 2022 | The Black Swindler | Michiru Emoto | Episode 2 | |
| 2022 | First Love | young Yae Noguchi | | |
| 2023 | Soar High! | Akizuki Fumiko | Asadora | |
| 2023 | A Galaxy Next Door | Goshiki Shiori | | |
| 2023 | Ya Boy Kongming! | Kuon Nanami | | |
| 2024 | GTO Revival | Suzuka Ichikawa | | |
| 2024 | Sibling Intrusion | Yuki Watarase | Lead role | |
| 2024 | Looking for a Place to Belong: Me, my Family, and I Share a House | Narrator | Documentary | |
| 2025 | Diary of a Kawasaki Public Restaurant | Narrator | Documentary | |
| 2025 | Finale Rondo: To You Whom I Can Never Meet Again | Yuzuha Kume | | |
| 2026 | Hanae Mori, Butterfly Beyond | Hanae Mori | Lead role | |

=== Music video appearances ===
| Year | Artist | Song | Notes | Ref. |
|---|---|---|---|---|
| 2021 | Kirinji | Twilight | ft. Maika Loubté | |
| 2022 | Uru | I'm by Your Side | | |
| 2022 | Yūzō Kayama | The Sea Made Me a Man | | |

=== Radio drama ===
| Year | Title | Role | Notes | Ref. |
|---|---|---|---|---|
| 2023 | The Summer Without Songs | Akizuki Fumiko | Lead role | |

=== Advertisement ===
- Pocari Sweat (2016–2018)–Commercial model
- Edwin (2016)–Image model
- 55th "Sendenkaigi Award" (2017, Sendenkaigi )–Image model
- Kyoto Kimono Yuzen (2018)–Image model

== Bibliography ==
=== Photobook ===
- Pitter-Patter (May 27, 2022, Seigensha) ISBN 978-4-86152-893-4
