= Wind Breaker (manga) =

Japanese manga series and its adaptations

- First tankōbon volume cover, featuring Haruka Sakura
- Genre: Adventure; Martial arts; Yankī
- Manga
- Written by: Satoru Nii
- Published by: Kodansha
- English publisher: NA: Kodansha USA
- Imprint: Shōnen Magazine Comics
- Magazine: Magazine Pocket
- Original run: January 13, 2021 – present
- Volumes: 27
- Anime television series
- Directed by: Toshifumi Akai
- Produced by: Hiroyuki Shimizu; Masanori Miyake; Shin Furukawa
- Written by: Hiroshi Seko
- Music by: Ryo Takahashi
- Studio: CloverWorks
- Licensed by: NA: Aniplex of America; SEA: Muse Communication
- Original network: JNN (MBS, TBS)
- English network: SEA: Animax Asia; US: Adult Swim (Toonami)
- Original run: April 5, 2024 – June 20, 2025
- Episodes: 25
- Live-action film
- Directed by: Kentarō Hagiwara
- Produced by: Taichi Takeda; Yasutaka Fukuya
- Written by: Yōsuke Masaike
- Music by: Yaffle; Rikimaru Sakuragi
- Studio: Wowow; Nikkatsu
- Released: December 5, 2025
- icon

Wind Breaker (stylized in all caps) is a Japanese manga series written and illustrated by Satoru Nii that began serialization on Kodansha's Magazine Pocket manga website in January 2021. As of September 2026, the series' individual chapters have been collected in 27 tankōbon volumes. An anime television series adaptation produced by CloverWorks aired from April to June 2024. A second season aired from April to June 2025. A live-action film adaptation was released in Japan in December 2025.

== Plot ==
From an early age, Haruka Sakura was an outcast due to his unconventional appearance and lack of social skills. However, the harsh treatments he received made him a skilled fighter, which is now the only thing he prides himself on. After enrolling at Furin High School, where it is rumored that strength is valued over academics, Sakura has only one goal—to become the best.

After being involved in a street brawl the day before his enrollment, Sakura meets a group of his future classmates. Instead of rejecting him, his classmates fight alongside him, showing that the school's real concern is protecting the town of Makochi from harm—hence why the students call themselves Bofurin. Surprised by the support and appreciation of the townspeople, Sakura has a hard time accepting their goodwill. Though he is unfamiliar with others showing him kindness, he must learn to overcome his discomfort when Bofurin is pitted against formidable enemies. After experiencing the feeling of acceptance, he finds himself fighting for the sake of others for the first time.

== Characters ==
Haruka Sakura (桜 遥, Sakura Haruka)
Voiced by: Yuma Uchida (Japanese); Austin Tindle (English)
Portrayed by: Koshi Mizukami
A first-year transfer student at Furin High School who enrolled there in order to reach the top. Sakura is a lonesome fighter who has heterochromia in his hair and eyes which, along with his lack of social skills, caused him to be ostracized. Despite his stubbornness, he is a tsundere, has a sense of justice, and is sensitive towards romance. It is implied that Sakura refuses friendship because of his past, as his strength caused other people to hate him.
Akihiko Nirei (楡井 秋彦, Nirei Akihiko)
Voiced by: Shōya Chiba (Japanese); Bryson Baugus (English)
Portrayed by: Taisei Kido
A first-year student at Furin High School who becomes Sakura's best friend and right-hand man alongside Suō. Nirei always carries a notebook and pen and is knowledgeable about delinquents from other schools. He is not very strong at fighting, but after Sakura saved his life, Nirei vows to help him reach the top.
Hayato Suō (蘇枋 隼飛, Suō Hayato)
Voiced by: Nobunaga Shimazaki (Japanese); Dallas Reid (English)
Portrayed by: Keito Tsuna
A first-year student at Furin High School who becomes Sakura's best friend and right-hand man alongside Nirei. Suō is a mysterious teenager who wears an eyepatch, has a calm fighting style similar to Aikido, and a teasing sense of humor.
Kyōtarō Sugishita (杉下 京太郎, Sugishita Kyōtarō)
Voiced by: Kōki Uchiyama (Japanese); Orion Pitts (English)
Portrayed by: Junon
A first-year student at Furin High School in Class 1 and Umemiya's loyal and devoted fanatic. Sugishita does not talk much but is considered one of the strongest fighters in Bofurin. He is also Sakura's rival.
Hajime Umemiya (梅宮 一, Umemiya Hajime)
Voiced by: Yuichi Nakamura (Japanese); Aaron Campbell (English)
Portrayed by: Shuhei Uesugi
A third-year student and the top representative of Furin High School. In spite of being the charismatic leader of Bofurin, Umemiya is cheerful and likes gardening, which makes Sakura question his status as the leader. He is also Kotoha's protective adoptive brother.
Tōma Hiragi (柊 登馬, Hiiragi Tōma)
Voiced by: Ryōta Suzuki (Japanese); Nick Huber (English)
Portrayed by: Motoki Nakazawa
A third-year student at Furin High School and one of the Four Heavenly Generals, Hiragi is the head of Tamon team and Umemiya's closest friend and right-hand man. He tends to get stomachaches from stress and carries medicine to help with it.
Kotoha Tachibana (橘 ことは, Tachibana Kotoha)
Voiced by: Ikumi Hasegawa (Japanese); Hollis Beck (English)
Portrayed by: Rikako Yagi
A café worker in the district who is like a big sister to the Furin High School students, despite being younger than them. Kotoha is Umemiya's adoptive sister.
Chōji Tomiyama (兎耳山 丁子, Tomiyama Chōji)
Voiced by: Kikunosuke Toya (Japanese); Derick Snow (English)
Portrayed by: Kōki Yamashita
The cheerful leader of Shishitoren.
Jō Togame (十亀 条, Togame Jō)
Voiced by: Yūichirō Umehara (Japanese); Chris Guerrero (English)
Portrayed by: Noritaka Hamao
The second-in-command of Shishitoren.
Kōta Sako (佐狐 浩太, Sako Kōta)
Voiced by: Chiaki Kobayashi (Japanese); Ian Moore (English)
Portrayed by: Ryōsuke Sota
A member of Shishitoren who has a past with Hiragi.
Yukinari Arima (有馬 雪成, Arima Yukinari)
Voiced by: Masaaki Mizunaka (Japanese); Alex Hom (English)
Portrayed by: Rion Takahashi
A member of Shishitoren and Kanuma's friend.
Minoru Kanuma (鹿沼 稔, Kanuma Minoru)
Voiced by: Hiromu Mineta (Japanese); Kyle Igneczi (English)
Portrayed by: Mamoru Hagiwara
A member of Shishitoren and Arima's friend.
Mitsuki Kiryū (桐生 三輝, Kiryū Mitsuki)
Voiced by: Toshiyuki Toyonaga (Japanese); Drew Breedlove (English)
A first-year student at Furin High School in Class 1. Gentle and thoughtful, Kiryu loves playing video games and likes to add "chan" to his friends' names as a term of endearment.
Taiga Tsugeura (柘浦 大河, Tsugeura Taiga)
Voiced by: Kengo Kawanishi (Japanese); Jordan Dash Cruz (English)
A first-year student at Furin High School in Class 1. Loud and energetic, Tsugeura is obsessed with muscle training and asking people about their "virtues" or "aesthetics".
Ren Kaji (梶 蓮, Kaji Ren)
Voiced by: Nobuhiko Okamoto (Japanese); Kevin D. Thelwell (English)
A second-year student at Furin High School and the grade captain of Class 1. Kaji usually carries lollipop and wears headphones while listening to loud music.
Masaki Anzai (杏西 雅紀, Anzai Masaki)
Voiced by: Shogo Sakata (Japanese); Blake McNamara (English)
A first-year student at Furin High School in Class 1 and one of Sakura's classmates. He is also Nagato and Tsuchiya's childhood friend.
Atsushi Nagato (長門 淳史, Nagato Atsushi)
Voiced by: Anan Furuya, Minami Hinata (young) (Japanese); Travis Mullenix (English)
Anzai's childhood friend who was a member and victim of KEEL.
Shingo Natori (名取 慎吾, Natori Shingo)
Voiced by: Junya Enoki (Japanese); Alejandro Saab (English)
The sociopathic crime boss of KEEL, Natori is violent, manipulative, and sadistic.
Takeru Kongō (金剛 尊, Kongō Takeru)
Voiced by: Chiharu Sawashiro (Japanese); Eric Vale (English)
One of the five VIP members of KEEL.
Renji Kaga (名取 慎吾, Kaga Renji)
Voiced by: Shōya Ishige (Japanese); Josh Putnam (English)
One of the five VIP members of KEEL.
Taishi Mogami (最上 大志, Mogami Taishi)
Voiced by: Tatsumaru Tachibana (Japanese); Kristian Eros (English)
One of the five VIP members of KEEL.
Shiyū Kirishima (霧島 士佑, Kirishima Shiyū)
Voiced by: Kō Bonkobara
One of the five VIP members of KEEL.
Hansuke Tone (利根 帆介, Tone Hansuke)
Voiced by: Atsushi Tamaru (Japanese); Gerard Caster (English)
One of the five VIP members of KEEL.
Tasuku Tsubakino (椿野佑, Tsubakino Tasuku)
Voiced by: Ryōta Ōsaka (Japanese); Kiba Walker, Maria Delilah (young) (English)
A third-year student at Furin High School and one of the Four Heavenly Generals, Tsubakino is the head of Jikoku team. Stylish and passionate, he wears a girl's uniform and dresses femininely in general. He is incredibly loyal to Umemiya and is very fond of Sakura and Nirei. Tsubakino also works as a dancer and waiter at Show Pub Ougi and a protective older sister figure to Shizuka.
Seiryū Sakaki (榊 晴竜, Sakaki Seiryū)
Voiced by: Soma Saito (Japanese); Brandon Acosta (English)
The eldest of the Sakaki twins and a third-year student at Furin High School serving as Tsubakino's right-hand man.
Uryū Sakaki (榊 雨竜, Sakaki Uryū)
Voiced by: Kazuki Ura (Japanese); Sean Letourneau (English)
The youngest of the Sakaki twins and a third-year student at Furin High School serving as Tsubakino's right-hand man.
Kanji Nakamura (中村 幹路, Nakamura Kanji)
Voiced by: Kazuyuki Okitsu (Japanese); Chris Gardner (English)
The 18-year-old handsome chairman of Roppo-Ichiza, Kanji is an incredibly tough and impulsive fighter who works to protect the Keisei Street alongside a group of strong fighters dressed in suits. Kanji cares deeply for Shizuka and also works as a waiter and bodyguard at Show Pub Ougi, where he first met Tsubakino.
Shizuka Narita (成田 静香, Narita Shizuka)
Voiced by: Reina Ueda (Japanese); Alexis Tipton (English)
A singer who works at Show Pub Ougi alongside Kanji and a younger sister figure to Tsubakino. Shizuka first met Sakura, Nirei and Suō when she was being chased by the members of GRAVEL.
Akihito Miyoshi (美吉 彰人, Miyoshi Akihito)
Voiced by: Kakeru Hatano (Japanese); Brandon Solis (English)
A member of Roppo-Ichiza who serves as a host.
Shōgo Hidaka (日高 将吾, Hidaka Shōgo)
Voiced by: Tarō Kiuchi (Japanese); Monty Thompson (English)
A member of Roppo-Ichiza who works as a restaurant manager.
Ritsu Otowa (音羽 律, Otowa Ritsu)
Voiced by: Yūki Shin
A member of Roppo-Ichiza who is a piano player.
Shūhei Suzuri (硯 秀平, Suzuri Shūhei)
Voiced by: Natsuki Hanae (Japanese); Eduardo Vildasol (English)
The leader of GRAVEL, a large group of impoverished people from the Sunaba District.
Yamato Endō (棪堂 哉真斗, Endō Yamato)
Voiced by: Daisuke Ono (Japanese); Aaron Roberts (English)
A former student of Furin High School and the co-leader of Noroshi.
Chika Takiishi (焚石 矢, Takiishi Chika)
Voiced by: Hiroshi Kamiya
A former student of Furin High School and the co-leader of Noroshi.
Takumi Momose (桃瀬 匠, Momose Takumi)
Voiced by: Koutaro Nishiyama
A third-year student at Furin High School and one of the Four Heavenly Generals, Momose is the head of Zojo team.
Saku Mizuki (水木 聡久, Mizuki Saku)
Voiced by: Tomoaki Maeno
A third-year student at Furin High School and one of the Four Heavenly Generals, Mizuki is the head of Komoku team.
Yūgo Wanijima (鰐島 勇吾, Wanijima Yūgo)
Voiced by: Yōhei Azakami (video game)
A member of Shishitoren who is the third strongest member of the team.

== Production ==
Wind Breaker is written and illustrated by Satoru Nii. He was inspired to draw manga as he consistently read Weekly Shōnen Magazine during his childhood. While attending university, Nii submitted a dark fantasy work titled Uramare-ya for a newcomer award and then achieved a Kodansha-published serialization with the gender bender / sports manga Danshi Bado-Bu ni Joshi ga Magireteru Secret Badminton Club. When a second badminton series stalled in development and after he received some advice from an editor, Nii shifted his focus to creating stories about male characters he called "Cool Boys" (カッコいい男の子, Kakkoī Otokonoko). Wind Breaker was born out of Nii's desire to create a series centered around this archetype, which he wished to accomplish by studying similar works while consulting with an editor. Manga like Rave Master and Samurai Deeper Kyo, both of which he grew up reading and that contained such characters, served as influences.

Nii initially considered having Umemiya as the main character. However, he was unable to make progress with the team leader of Bofurin as the protagonist, so he brought in Sakura to fill the role to lend an outsider's perspective on the story's circumstances. The author has called Sakura his favorite character for embodying the "cool" factor he sought to accomplish and for the time he devoted to designing his appearance and personality. He chose to give him heterochromatic eyes and hair to add visual complexity and to make him distinguishable as the main character at a glance. He further likened him to a stray cat in his design, stating his light movements and lack of body thickness were unlike those of normal humans. Also feeling that he lacked the personality of a main character in an early draft, Nii gave Sakura the tsundere-like trait of being embarrassed when someone praised or thanked him.

The main setting of the manga was modeled after a shopping district in Tokyo. Bofurin's team color is green, representing plants, while the rival team's (Shishitoren) color is red, representing a red lantern found in a tavern. Nii stated he had nearly no involvement in his manga's anime adaptation. He admitted to being impressed by the voice actors' commitments to their parts and was consequently able to reinterpret his own characters as a result.

== Media ==
=== Manga ===
Written and illustrated by Satoru Nii, the series began serialization on Kodansha's Magazine Pocket website on January 13, 2021. As of September 2026, the series' individual chapters have been collected in 27 tankōbon volumes.

In March 2022, Kodansha USA announced that they had licensed the series for digital English publication. During their Anime NYC 2022 panel, Kodansha USA announced that they would begin releasing print copies in late 2023.

==== Volumes ====
No.	Original release date	Original ISBN	English release date	English ISBN
1	May 7, 2021	978-4-06-522979-8	April 26, 2022 (digital); August 1, 2023 (print)	978-1-68-491117-2 (digital); 978-1-64-651835-7 (print)
1. "Sakura and Furin" (サクラとフウリン, Sakura to Fuurin); 2. "The Hero of My Dreams" (憧れのヒーロー, Akogareno Hīrō); 3. "Fanatic" (狂信者, Kyōshinja); 4. "The Man Who Stands at the Top" (頂に立つ男, Itadaki ni Tatsu Otoko); 5. "Shishitoren" (獅子頭連, Shishitouren)
2	July 9, 2021	978-4-06-524015-1	May 24, 2022 (digital); October 3, 2023 (print)	978-1-68-491183-7 (digital); 978-1-64-651836-4 (print)
6. "Spark" (火種, Hidane); 7. "Hajime Umemiya" (梅宮 一, Umemiya Hajime); 8. "Clash" (衝突, Shōtotsu); 9. "Eve of the Fight" (決戦前夜, Kessen Zen'ya); 10. "Kyotaro Sugishita vs. Yukinari Arima" (杉下京太郎vs.有馬雪成, Sugishita Kyōtarō bāsasu Arima Yukinari); 11. "A Gentleman" (優しい男, Yasashī Otoko); 12. "Step On Up" (大人の階段, Otona no Kaidan); 13. "Fate" (因縁, In'nen); 14. "God of War" (武神, Bushin)
3	September 9, 2021	978-4-06-524849-2	June 28, 2022 (digital); December 5, 2023 (print)	978-1-68-491235-3 (digital); 978-1-64-651837-1 (print)
15. "Vow to Follow" (その背中を追って, Sono Senaka o Otte); 16. "The Opponent's True Power" (副頭取の実力, Fuku Tōdori no Jitsuryoku); 17. "Fight to Win" (負けられない戦い, Make Rarenai Tatakai); 18. "Moment of Flux" (異変, Ihen); 19. "The Setting Sun" (斜陽, Shayō); 20. "Wake Up" (目ぇ覚ませ, Me Samase); 21. "The Battle Concludes" (激闘の果て, Gekitō no Hate); 22. "Shared Beliefs" (思いを継いで, Omoi o Tsuide); 23. "The Top vs. The Top" (頂点vs.頂点, Chōten bāsasu Chōten)
4	November 9, 2021	978-4-06-525995-5	July 12, 2022 (digital); February 6, 2024 (print)	978-1-68-491346-6 (digital); 978-1-64-651838-8 (print)
24. "The Takedown" (決壊, Kekkai); 25. "Roar" (叫び, Sakebi); 26. "Good Old Days" (懐古, Kaiko); 27. "Settling the Score" (けじめ, Kejime); 28. "Umemiya's Style" (梅宮の流儀, Umemiya no Ryūgi); 29. "The Sun Rises Again" (陽はまた昇る, Hihamata no Boru); 30. "Dialogue" (対話, Taiwa); 31. "A New Classmate" (新たな級友, Aratana Kyūyū); 32. "Muscle & Gentle" (マッスル&ジェントル, Massuru ando Jentoru)
5	January 7, 2022	978-4-06-526596-3	August 9, 2022 (digital); April 9, 2024 (print)	978-1-68-491392-3 (digital); 978-1-64-651839-5 (print)
33. "Three Brave Men" (三勇士, Myuji); 34. "Class Leader" (級長, Kyūchō); 35. "Ren Kaji" (梶 蓮, Kaji Ren); 36. "Tried and True" (頼られる者, Tayora Reru Mono); 37. "One Step" (一歩, Ichi ho); 38. "The Four Kings" (四天王, Shiten'nō); 39. "Danger" (危機, Kiki); 40. "A Promise" (約束, Yakusoku); 41. "For a Friend" (友のため, Tomo no Tame)
6	March 9, 2022	978-4-06-527281-7	September 13, 2022 (digital); June 4, 2024 (print)	978-1-68-491435-7 (digital); 978-1-64-651840-1 (print)
42. "Rage" (怒り, Ikari); 43. "Assassin" (刺客, Shikaku); 44. "Resolve" (覚悟, Kakugo); 45. "That Which We Protect" (守るべきもの, Mamoru Beki Mono); 46. "Guide" (道標, Michishirube); 47. "Absolute Authority" (支配者, Shihaisha); 48. "Rebellion" (反撃, Hangeki); 49. "Proof of Humanity" (人間の証明, Ningen no Shōmei); 50. "Extreme Emotions" (激情, Gekijō)
7	June 9, 2022	978-4-06-528174-1	November 22, 2022 (digital); August 6, 2024 (print)	978-1-68-491556-9 (digital); 978-1-64-651841-8 (print)
51. "Animal" (獣, Jū); 52. "Conclusion" (決着, Ketchaku); 53. "Admiration" (憧れ, Akogare); 54. "Re:Start" (Note: Stylized as "Re:start"); 55. "Welcome Back" (おかえり, Okaeri); 56. "Visiting His House" (訪問, Hōmon); 57. "Visiting the Sick" (お見舞い, Omimai); 58. "Discussion" (相談, Sōdan)
8	August 9, 2022	978-4-06-528846-7	January 10, 2023 (digital); October 1, 2024 (print)	978-1-68-491640-5 (digital); 978-1-64-651842-5 (print)
59. "The Senpai's Teachings" (先輩の教え, Senpai no Oshie); 60. "A Place I Belong" (居場所, Ibasho); 61. "Get-Together" (親睦会, Shinbokukai); 62. "Tsubaki" (椿); 63. "A Date?" (デート?, Dēto?); 64. "Childhood Days" (少年時代, Shōnen Jidai); 65. "Repaying the Favor" (恩返し, Ongaeshi); 66. "Hidden Feelings" (密かな想い, Hisokana Omoi)
9	October 7, 2022	978-4-06-529412-3	March 14, 2023 (digital); February 4, 2025 (print)	978-1-68-491847-8 (digital); 978-1-64-651956-9 (print)
67. "Night Street" (宵の街, Yoi no Machi); 68. "Improvement" (進歩, Shinpo); 69. "Special Training" (特訓, Tokkun); 70. "The Night Patrollers" (夜廻り衆, Yomawari Shū); 71. "Sisters" (姉妹関係, Shimai Kankei); 72. "The Guardian of the Night" (夜の番人, Yoru no Ban'nin); 73. "Shared Frontlines" (共同戦線, Kyōdō Sensen); 74. "The Lawless One" (無法者, Muhōmono)
10	January 6, 2023	978-4-06-530343-6	June 13, 2023 (digital); April 1, 2025 (print)	978-1-68-491967-3 (digital); 978-1-64-651957-6 (print)
75. "Concern" (憂い, Ui); 76. "A Girl's Plea" (少女の願い, Shōjo no Negai); 77. "Shall We Dance?"; 78. "War Dance" (乱舞, Ranbu); 79. "Grounds for Strength" (強さの理由, Tsuyosa no Riyū); 80. "Ideals and Reality" (理想と現実, Risō to Genjitsu); 81. "Rise to Action" (決起, Kekki); 82. "Salvation" (救いの手, Sukuinote)
11	April 7, 2023	978-4-06-531234-6	August 8, 2023 (digital); June 3, 2025 (print)	979-8-88-933096-7 (digital); 978-1-64-651958-3 (print)
83. "Reborn" (再生, Saisei); 84. "Naïveté" (綺麗事, Kireigoto); 85. "Spark" (口火, Kuchibi); 86. "Wrath" (逆鱗, Gekirin); 87. "After the Storm" (嵐のあと, Arashi no Ato); 88. "Emergency Meeting" (緊急会議, Kinkyū Kaigi); 89. "Past" (昔日, Sekijitsu); 90. "The Shadows" (影, Kage)
12	June 8, 2023	978-4-06-531879-9	October 20, 2023 (digital); July 1, 2025 (print)	979-8-88-933189-6 (digital); 978-1-64-651959-0 (print)
91. "Strength for Another" (誰が為の強さ, Daregatame no Tsuyosa); 92. "A Declaration of War" (宣戦布告, Sensen Fukoku); 93. "Hajime Umemiya's Childhood Days" (梅宮一/少年時代, Umemiya Ichi/Shōnen Jidai); 94. "Hajime Umemiya's Childhood Days 2" (梅宮一/少年時代 2, Umemiya Ichi/Shōnen Jidai Ni); 95. "Hajime Umemiya's Childhood Days 3" (梅宮一/少年時代 3, Umemiya Ichi/Shōnen Jidai San); 96. "Hajime Umemiya's Ambition Arc" (梅宮一/立志編, Umemiya Ichi/Risshi-hen); 97. "Hajime Umemiya's Ambition Arc 2" (梅宮一/立志編 2, Umemiya Ichi/Risshi-hen Ni); 98. "The Place I Want to Protect" (守りたい場所, Mamoritai Basho)
13	August 8, 2023	978-4-06-532670-1	January 9, 2024 (digital); August 5, 2025 (print)	979-8-88-933325-8 (digital); 978-1-64-651960-6 (print)
99. "Strategy Meeting" (軍議, Gun gi); 100. "The Great Fires of Extinction" (国崩(こくほう)大火開演, Kokuhō Taika Kaien); 101. "Teamwork" (チームワーク, Chīmu Wāku); 102. "Partners" (相棒, Aibō); 103. "Dark Clouds" (暗雲, An'un); 104. "Uninvited Guest" (招かれざる客, Maneka Rezaru Kyaku); 105. "Noroshi" (烽, Hōen); Short Story
14	November 9, 2023	978-4-06-533549-9	April 9, 2024 (digital); September 9, 2025 (print)	979-8-88-933438-5 (digital); 978-1-64-651961-3 (print)
106. "The Gathered Fighters" (集いし猛者, Tsudoishi Mosa); 107. "Resolve" (決意, Ketsui); 108. "What Must Be Done" (為すべきこと, Nasubeki Koto); 109. "A New View" (新たな景色, Aratana Keshiki); 110. "Discipline" (教育, Kyōiku); 111. "Dull, Humdrum Days" (退屈な日々, Taikutsuna Hibi); 112. "After Wavering" (逡巡の先に, Shunjun no Saki ni); 113. "Shock Wave" (激震, Gekishin)
15	January 9, 2024	978-4-06-534179-7	June 18, 2024 (digital); October 7, 2025 (print)	979-8-88-933574-0 (digital); 978-1-64-651962-0 (print)
114. "Life-or-Death" (死線, Shisen); 115. "Savior" (救世主, Kyūseishu); 116. "Raging Lion" (獅子奮迅, Shishifunjin); 117. "Monster" (怪物, Kaibutsu); 118. "Values" (価値観, Kachikan); 119. "The Way of the Fist" (拳の使い道, Ken no Tsukaimichi); 120. "War" (闘争, Tōsō); 121. "My Prince" (王子様, Ōji-sama)
16	March 8, 2024	978-4-06-534870-3	August 20, 2024 (digital); November 4, 2025 (print)	979-8-88-933697-6 (digital); 978-1-64-651963-7 (print)
122. "The Value of Love" (恋の価値, Koi no Kachi); 123. "Roar" (咆哮, Hōkō); 124. "Hating Myself" (嫌いな自分, Kiraina Jibun); 125. "Flash" (閃光, Senkō); 126. "By Your Side" (あなたの隣に, Anata no Tonari ni); 127. "The Dance of Rapture" (狂喜乱舞, Kyōki Ranbu); 128. "Pleasure" (快楽, Kairaku); 129. "Fury" (憤怒, Fundo)
17	May 9, 2024	978-4-06-535507-7	October 15, 2024 (digital); December 9, 2025 (print)	979-8-89-478104-4 (digital); 978-1-64-651964-4 (print)
130. "Beyond Pain" (痛みの果て, Itami no Hate); 131. "Target" (標的, Hyōteki); 132. "Rush" (駆けろ, Kakero); 133. "Face-to-Face" (対峙, Taiji); 134. "The Moment Longed For" (待ち焦がれた瞬間, Machikogareta Shunkan); 135. "The Lion's Strike" (獅子の一撃, Shishi no Ichigeki); 136. "King of the Jungle" (百獣の王, Hyakujū no Ō); 137. "Baton" (バトン)
18	August 7, 2024	978-4-06-536127-6	January 28, 2025 (digital); January 6, 2026 (print)	979-8-89-478319-2 (digital); 978-1-64-651965-1 (print)
138. "Bloom" (開花, Kaika); 139. "Reason Behind the Rage" (怒りの理由(わけ), Ikari no Wake); 140. "What Should've Been" (在るべき姿, Arubeki Sugata); 141. "True Target" (本命, Honmei); 142. "Revelation" (天啓, Tenkei); 143. "Joy" (歓喜, Kanki); 144. "Coming Apart at the Seams" (綻び, Hokorobi); Short Story
19	October 8, 2024	978-4-06-537189-3	March 25, 2025 (digital); February 3, 2026 (print)	979-8-89-478436-6 (digital); 978-1-64-651966-8 (print)
145. "The Abyss" (深淵, Shin'en); 146. "Up Again" (再起, Saiki); 147. "One More Time" (もう一度, Mōichido); 148. "Do or Die" (決死, Kesshi); 149. "Where Victory and Defeat Lead" (勝敗の行方, Shōhai no Yukue); 150. "Cherished Ambition" (本懐, Honkai); 151. "Ignite" (着火, Chakka); 152. "Symbol" (象徴(あかし), Akashi)
20	January 8, 2025	978-4-06-538060-4; 978-4-06-538331-5 (LE)	May 27, 2025 (digital); March 3, 2026 (print)	979-8-89-478527-1 (digital); 979-8-88-877619-3 (print)
153. "Heat" (熱, Netsu); 154. "Raging Inferno" (烈火, Rekka); 155. "Oath" (誓い, Chikai); 156. "Overheat" (オーバーヒート, Ōbāhīto); 157. "Remaining Embers" (残火, Zanka); 158. "The Great Fires of Extinction" (国崩大火 終演, Kunikuzushi Taika Shūen); 159. "Celebratory Toast" (祝杯, Shukuhai); 160. "Melting Snow" (雪解け, Yukidoke)
21	March 7, 2025	978-4-06-538840-2; 978-4-06-538988-1 (LE)	November 25, 2025 (digital)	979-8-89-478765-7
161. "The Fog Lifts" (霧は晴れて, Kiri wa Harete); 162. "Everyone's Feelings" (それぞれの想い, Sorezore no Omoi); 163. "Seeds of Worry" (悩みの種, Nayami no Tane); 164. "Ties" (しがらみ, Shigarami); 165. "Haven" (安息, Ansoku); 166. "Thoughts Kept Inside" (内なる想い, Uchinaru Omoi); 167. "Flowering Bud" (芽生え, Mebae); 168. "To Show Color" (色づき, Irodzuki); 169. "Summer Break" (夏休み, Natsuyasumi)
22	June 9, 2025	978-4-06-539749-7; 978-4-06-539750-3 (LE)	February 24, 2026 (digital)	979-8-89-478895-1
170. "Resurgence" (再燃, Sainen); 171. "A Happy Gathering" (団欒, Danran); 172. "The Visit" (訪問, Hōmon); 173. "Friction" (軋轢, Atsureki); 174. "Within My Chest" (胸の内, Mune no Uchi); 175. "Pursuit" (追跡, Tsuiseki); 176. "A Cherished Person" (大切な人, Taisetsuna Hito); Short Story
23	September 9, 2025	978-4-06-540692-2	—	—
177. "The Vision of Strength" (強さの形, Tsuyosa no Katachi); 178. "Brother and Sister" (姉弟, Kyōdai); 179. "The Summer Festival" (夏祭り, Natsu Matsuri); 180. "Yugo Wanijima" (鰐島勇吾, Wanijima Yūgo); 181. "Lamplight" (灯火, Touka); 182. "Welcome Party" (歓迎会, Kangeikai); 183. "Thorns in the Heart" (心の棘, Kokoro no Toge); 184. "Next to You" (隣り合わせ, Tonari Awase); 185. "Encircle" (輪, Wa)
24	December 9, 2025	978-4-06-541896-3	—	—
186. "Maddening" (激昂, Gekikō); 187. "Supporters" (恩人, Onjin); 188. "New Semester" (新学期, Shin Gakki); 189. "Momijikawa" (楓川); 190. "Touch-and-Go" (一触即発, Isshoku Soku Hatsu); 191. "Distance" (距離, Kyori); 192. "Close the Distance" (接近, Sekkin); 193. "Invitation" (誘い, Sasoi); 194. "The Past You Shoulder" (背負いし過去, Shoishi Kako)
25	March 9, 2026	978-4-06-542958-7	—	—
195. "Lone Wolf" (一匹狼, Ippiki Ōkami); 196. "Whereabouts" (行方, Yukue); 197. "At the Tip of the Spear" (矛先, Hokosaki); 198. "Tidings" (報せ, Shirase); 199. "Daunting" (威圧, Iatsu); 200. "Twilight" (黄昏, Tasogare); 201. "Funeral" (葬送, Sōsō); 202. "Sunset" (日没, Nichibotsu)
26	June 9, 2026	978-4-06-543881-7	—	—
203. "The Source" (原点, Genten); 204. "Deep Inside" (心奥, Shin'ō); 205. "The Duel" (決闘, Kettō); 206. "Connection" (交わり, Majiwari); 207. "A New Morning" (新たな朝, Aratana Asa); 208. "Peaceful Days" (穏やかな日々, Odayakana Hibi); 209. "Disappearance" (失踪, Shissō); 210. "Fleeting Blossoms and Scattering Leaves" (飛花落葉, Hikara Koyō)
27	September 9, 2026	978-4-06-544619-5	—	—
211. "Farewell" (決別, Ketsubetsu); 212. "Ripple" (波紋, Hamon); 213. "Circumstance" (消息, Shōsoku); 214. "Meeting at the Table" (円卓, Entaku); 215. "Visitor" (来訪者, Raihō-sha); 216. "The Truth" (正体, Shōtai); 217. "The Cosmopolitan City" (万国街, Bankokugai); 218. "Hole in the Heart" (心の穴, Kokoro no Ana)
28	December 9, 2026	978-4-06-545718-4	—	—

==== Chapters not yet in tankōbon format ====
- 219. "Knot" (結び目, Musubime)
- 220. "All His Thoughts" (思いの丈, Omoinotake)
- 221. "Encouragement" (激励, Gekirei)
- 222. "An Expedition" (遠征, Ensei)
- 223. "Infiltration" (潜入, Sen'nyū)
- 224. "The Recesses of the City" (街の内奥, Machi no Naiō)
- 225. "Chance Meeting" (邂逅, Kaigō)
- 226. "All Under Control" (収束, Shūsoku)
- 227. "Guide" (案内人, Annainin)
- 228. "Remnants of the Past" (過去の残影, Kako no Zan'ei)
- 229. "Poison" (毒, Doku)
- 230. "Red Chanpuru" (レッドチャンプルー, Reddo Chanpurū)
- 231. "Puppet" (傀儡, Kugutsu)
- 232. "Crimson Promise" (赫い約束, Akai Yakusoku)
- 233. "Crimson Promise 2" (赫い約束②, Akai Yakusoku (Ni))
- 234. "Crimson Promise 3" (赫い約束③, Akai Yakusoku (San))
- 235. "Crimson Promise 4" (赫い約束④, Akai Yakusoku (Yon))
- 236. "Crimson Promise 5" (赫い約束⑤, Akai Yakusoku (Go))

=== Anime ===
An anime television series adaptation produced by CloverWorks was announced in March 2023. It is directed by Toshifumi Akai, with series composition and scripts by Hiroshi Seko, character designs by Taishi Kawakami, and music composed by Ryo Takahashi. The first season aired from April 5 to June 28, 2024, on the new Super Animeism Turbo programming block on all JNN affiliates, including its flagship stations MBS and TBS. (Note: MBS and TBS listed the series premiere on April 4, 2024, at 24:26, which is effectively April 5 at 12:26 a.m. JST.) The opening theme song is "Zettai Reido" (絶対零度; lit. 'Absolute Zero'), performed by Natori, while the ending theme song is "Muteki" (無敵; lit. 'Unbeatable'), performed by Young Kee.

Immediately following the broadcast of the first season, a second season was announced. It aired on the same programming block from April 4 to June 20, 2025. (Note: MBS and TBS listed the season premiere on April 3, 2025, at 24:26, which is effectively April 4 at 12:26 a.m. JST.) The opening theme song is "Boyz", performed by SixTones, while the ending theme song is "It's Myself", performed by Shytaupe.

Aniplex of America licensed the series and is streaming it on Crunchyroll. The English dub for the series began broadcasting on Adult Swim's Toonami programming block on October 11, 2026. Muse Communication licensed the series in Southeast Asia.

==== Episodes ====
===== Season 1 (2024) =====
No. overall	No. in season	Title	Directed by	Storyboarded by	Original release date	English air date
1	1	"Sakura Arrives at Furin"; Transliteration: "Sakura to Fūrin" (Japanese: サクラとフウリン)	Toshifumi Akai	Toshifumi Akai	April 5, 2024	October 11, 2026
Haruka Sakura arrives in Makochi, determined to become the strongest fighter at Furin High School. After rescuing Kotoha Tachibana from a gang of delinquents, he visits her café where she explains how crime once plagued the town. Although Kotoha appreciates Sakura's actions, she warns that he will never become Furin's top fighter if he insists on standing alone. Sakura rejects her words, believing strength is all that matters. Later, Sakura encounters the same gang again and fights them when they threaten him. As the battle escalates, the gang takes Kotoha hostage, and Sakura struggles to protect her while questioning why he is helping someone else. Just as he begins to falter, Toma Hiragi arrives with fellow Furin students Ren Kaji, Yodai Matsumoto, and Jien Yanagida. Together, they defeat the gang and protect the townspeople. Kotoha explains that Furin's students began defending Makochi two years earlier, earning the name Bofurin, or "Wind Breaker". Once feared as delinquents, they are now beloved protectors of the town. When Kotoha treats Sakura's injured ankle, she tells him that he has not truly given up on people. Inspired, Sakura eagerly returns to the fight and realizes that Furin might be more exciting than he expected.
2	2	"The Hero of My Dreams"; Transliteration: "Akogare no Hīrō" (Japanese: 憧れのヒーロー)	Shinichirō Ueda	Toshifumi Akai	April 12, 2024 (Note: Due to the broadcast of the 2024 Masters Tournament, episode 2 aired at 1:58 a.m. JST, 1 hour and 32 minutes after the original air time.)	October 18, 2026
Sakura returns to Kotoha's café, where an elderly townswoman thanks him for his assistance. Kotoha encourages Sakura to look forward to meeting his classmates. There, Sakura meets Akihiko Nirei, an enthusiastic but clumsy student who admires Bofurin. Although he initially dismisses Nirei as weak, Kotoha reminds Sakura not to quickly judge others. While patrolling Makochi, Nirei attempts to protect a girl from a gang but gets beaten up by their leader. Sakura arrives and effortlessly defeats the entire gang, insisting that he only intervened because he despises people who pretend to be strong. Nirei admits that he enrolled at Furin because a student once saved him from bullies, inspiring himself to become strong and heroic as well. Sakura reassures Nirei that he is not as pathetic as he believes, and Nirei eagerly offers to guide him around the town. The pair arrive at Furin High School and discover they are assigned to the same class as the notable Bofurin members Hayato Suo, Mitsuki Kiryu, Taiga Tsugeura, and Kyotaro Sugishita. Suo welcomes Sakura after explaining to the class that Sakura helped defend the town during the recent brawl. However, Sugishita enters and threatens to crush Sakura, who excitedly welcomes his challenge.
3	3	"The Man Who Stands at the Top"; Transliteration: "Itadaki ni Tatsu Otoko" (Japanese: 頂に立つ男)	Akihito Sudō	Akihito Sudō	April 19, 2024	October 25, 2026
Sakura and Sugishita begin their scuffle. Suo explains that Sugishita has been loyal to the school's leader, Hajime Umemiya, since middle school. Sakura outmaneuvers Sugishita and lands a powerful kick. Their fight is interrupted by Umemiya's loudspeaker announcement, in which he welcomes the students with encouraging messages. Afterwards, Suo gets Sakura and Sugishita to shake hands. They both reluctantly comply, and Sakura begins to realize how warmly his classmates treat him. Takeshi Enomoto orders the class outside. During preparations, Sakura learns that Toma Hiragi is one of Bofurin's "four kings", who report to Umemiya. Hiragi takes Sakura, Sugishita, Suo, and Nirei on patrol, explaining that Bofurin's presence deters gangs. While helping townspeople, Sakura begins appreciating the community. Later at a railway tunnel, Nirei explains that Shishitoren controls territory beyond it. The group encounters Shishitoren members pursuing a Makochi middle schooler named Naohiro Sasaki. Sakura and Sugishita strike down one of the members. Their intervention draws Shishitoren's second-in-command, Jo Togame, who punishes his member for losing. Disgusted by Togame's treatment of the weak, Sakura challenges Shishitoren. Togame promises to remember Sakura before departing. Hiragi brings Sasaki to meet Umemiya, who cheerfully discusses vegetables and plans for a barbecue, leaving Sakura stunned.
4	4	"Clash"; Transliteration: "Shōtotsu" (Japanese: 衝突)	Kazuki Ohashi	Kazuki Ohashi	April 26, 2024	November 8, 2026
Hiragi visits Umemiya on top of the school's roof as he tends to his garden, revealing that his team has a problem. Their conversation confuses Sakura, Suo, Nirei, and Sasaki, as Umemiya seems more interested in his vegetable plants than their situation. Sakura initially struggles to understand Umemiya and why Bofurin admires him. Sasaki explains how he chased a shoplifter into Shishitoren territory and got attacked by them before Sakura and Sugishita rescued him. Umemiya thanks Sasaki for protecting their town and tells the middle schooler not to apologize for standing up for others, praising him for defending Bofurin's family. However, their conversation is suddenly interrupted when Shishitoren's leader, Choji Tomiyama, arrives on school grounds and challenges Umemiya. Tomiyama initially demands a one-on-one fight with him, but an arriving Togame suggests turning it into a team competition. They establish matchups between their strongest members, including Sakura against Togame, Sugishita against Arima, and Suo against Kanuma. Later that evening at Café Pothos, the Bofurin members discuss Shishitoren's troubled history and Sakura learns that Kotoha is Umemiya's younger foster sister. Umemiya explains that fighting is a way to communicate and understand their opponents. The next morning, the group heads into Shishitoren territory.
5	5	"A Gentleman"; Transliteration: "Yasashī Otoko" (Japanese: 優しい男)	Taito Kawakami	Taito Kawakami	May 3, 2024	November 15, 2026
As both Bofurin and Shishitoren gangs enter the latter's headquarters, an abandoned movie theater called the Orion Stars, Nirei explains that he wants to learn how to protect himself despite not participating in the matches. Sakura encourages him to observe everything. Before any of the matches begin, Umemiya reassures his teammates that the consequential fight is his battle against Tomiyama, and that their individual victories do not matter. However, Sakura insists that he has no intention of losing despite that fact. Shishitoren's Arima volunteers to fight first, challenging Sugishita. Despite taking a hard punch to the face, Sugishita effortlessly crushes Arima's arm and knocks him to the ground, securing a swift victory. Sakura despises Shishitoren's treatment of their defeated teammates, criticizing their claim of being devotees of power. Suo steps forward to face Kanuma, who is anxious over Arima's defeat. Rather than overpowering Kanuma, Suo repeatedly evades his attacks and challenges him to consider what it means to become an adult. Suo explains that empathy requires imagination and experience, helping Kanuma recognize his shortcomings. Kanuma breaks down as the match is called by Togame. Suo declares to Kanuma that he has taken a step towards adulthood before leaving the stage.
6	6	"Vow to Follow"; Transliteration: "Sono Senaka o Otte" (Japanese: その背中を追って)	Takashi Yasui	Yoriyasu Kogawa	May 10, 2024	November 22, 2026
7	7	"Fight to Win"; Transliteration: "Make Rarenai Tatakai" (Japanese: 負けられない戦い)	Tomoki Nakano	Takahiro Miura	May 17, 2024	November 29, 2026
8	8	"Succeeding the Past"; Transliteration: "Omoi o Tsuide" (Japanese: 思いを継いで)	Shinichirō Ueda	Tomohisa Taguchi	May 24, 2024	December 6, 2026
9	9	"Umemiya's Style"; Transliteration: "Umemiya no Ryūgi" (Japanese: 梅宮の流儀)	Hitomi Ezoe	Katsuhiko Kitada	May 31, 2024	TBA
10	10	"Dialogue"; Transliteration: "Taiwa" (Japanese: 対話)	Yoshiki Kitai	Yoriyasu Kogawa	June 7, 2024	TBA
11	11	"New Classmates"; Transliteration: "Aratana Kyūyū" (Japanese: 新たな級(と)友(も))	Kazuki Ohashi	Kazuki Ohashi	June 14, 2024 (Note: Episode 11 aired at 12:41 a.m. JST, 15 minutes after the original air time.)	TBA
12	12	"The Dependable One"; Transliteration: "Tayora Reru Mono" (Japanese: 頼られる者)	Tsurumi Mukoyama	Akihito Sudō	June 21, 2024	TBA
13	13	"For a Friend"; Transliteration: "Tomo no Tame" (Japanese: 友のため)	Hidetoshi Takahashi	Toshifumi Akai	June 28, 2024	TBA

===== Season 2 (2025) =====
No. overall	No. in season	Title	Directed by	Storyboarded by	Original release date
14	1	"Rage"; Transliteration: "Ikari" (Japanese: 怒り)	Toshifumi Akai	Toshifumi Akai	April 4, 2025
15	2	"Conclusion"; Transliteration: "Ketchaku" (Japanese: 決着)	Taito Kawakami	Hiroshi Kobayashi	April 11, 2025 (Note: Due to the broadcast of the 2025 Masters Tournament, episode 15 aired at 1:58 a.m. JST, 1 hour and 32 minutes after the original air time.)
16	3	"Re:Start"	Kazuki Ohashi	Kazuki Ohashi	April 18, 2025
17	4	"The Senpai's Teachings"; Transliteration: "Senpai no Oshie" (Japanese: 先輩の教え)	Yoshiki Kitai	Yoshiki Kitai	April 25, 2025
18	5	"A Place I Belong"; Transliteration: "Ibasho" (Japanese: 居場所)	Tsurumi Mukoyama	Yoriyasu Kogawa	May 2, 2025
19	6	"Hidden Feelings"; Transliteration: "Hisokana Omoi" (Japanese: 密かな想い)	Soji Ninomiya	Soji Ninomiya	May 9, 2025
20	7	"Night Street"; Transliteration: "Yoi no Machi" (Japanese: 宵の街)	Yuzu Hori	Yuzu Hori	May 16, 2025
21	8	"Joint Front"; Transliteration: "Kyōdō Sensen" (Japanese: 共同戦線)	Akira Yamada & Yuichi Shimohira	Hiroyuki Oshima	May 23, 2025
22	9	"Shall We Dance?"	Taito Kawakami	Taito Kawakami	May 30, 2025
23	10	"Salvation"; Transliteration: "Sukionote" (Japanese: 救いの手)	Kazuki Ohashi	Jun Nakagawa	June 6, 2025
24	11	"After the Storm"; Transliteration: "Arashi no Ato" (Japanese: 嵐のあと)	Shinichirō Ueda	Shinichirō Ueda	June 13, 2025
25	12	"Strength For Another"; Transliteration: "Dare ga Tame no Tsuyosa" (Japanese: 誰が為の強さ)	Toshifumi Akai	Toshifumi Akai	June 20, 2025

=== Live-action film ===
A live-action film adaptation was announced in June 2025. Distributed by Warner Bros. Pictures, the film was directed by Kentarō Hagiwara, with screenplay by Yōsuke Masaike, and music by Yaffle and Rikimaru Sakuragi. The cast includes Koshi Mizukami, Taisei Kido, Rikako Yagi, Keito Tsuna, Junon of Be:First, Motoki Nakazawa, and Shuhei Uesugi. The film was released in Japan on December 5, 2025. The theme song for the film is "Stay Strong", performed by Be:First.

=== Stage play ===
A stage play adaptation of the manga, titled Stage: Wind Breaker (舞台 WIND BREAKER, Butai: Uindo Bureikā), was announced in September 2024. It ran from January 1–3, 2025, at the WW Hall of the Cool Japan Park Osaka, and from January 10–19, 2025, at Theater H in Tokyo. The play was directed by Go Ueki, and the scripts written by Kaori Miura. The cast features Ryoga Ishikawa as Haruka Sakura, Hiroki Sana as Hajime Umemiya, Shunichi Takahashi as Tōma Hiragi, Yūto Andō as Hayato Suō, Taiga Nakamoto as Kyōtarō Sugishita, and Kazan Yokoyama as Akihiko Nirei.

=== Video game ===
A free-to-play action role-playing game, subtitled Furyō-tachi no Eiyūtan (不良たちの英雄譚; lit. 'Heroic Tales of Delinquents'), was announced during the "Tōfū Shōtengai Halloween Matsuri" event in October 2024. The game was released on March 12, 2025, in Japan for iOS, Android and PC via Steam.

== Reception ==
Wind Breaker ranked 20th at the 2021 Next Manga Award in the web manga category. At AnimeJapan 2022, the series ranked ninth in a poll asking what manga people want to see animated. It was nominated for the 49th Kodansha Manga Award in the shōnen category in 2025. The series was also nominated in the Harvey Awards for the Best Manga category in the same year.

By March 2022, the series had sold over 1.22 million copies between its digital and print versions. By September 2025, the series had over 10 million copies in circulation.

The anime was nominated for Best Action at the 9th Crunchyroll Anime Awards in 2025.
