= Shuhei Uesugi =

Japanese actor (born 1992)

- 上杉 柊平
- Born: Shuhei Uesugi; May 18, 1992 (age 34); Tokyo, Japan
- Occupation: Actor
- Years active: 2015–present
- Agent: Ken-On
- Website: Shuhei Uesugi

Shuhei Uesugi (上杉 柊平, Uesugi Shūhei; born 18 May 1992 in Tokyo) is a Japanese actor.

== Filmography ==
=== Television ===
Year	Title	Role	Notes	Ref.
2015	Hotel Concierge	Rui Nikaido		
2016	Toto Neechan	Hiroaki Minami	Asadora	
2016	Tower of Sand	Takumi Tsukui		
2017	The Dream of Nepenthes	Ryuhei Kajimada		
2017	Doctor-X: Surgeon Michiko Daimon	Shinji Kurokawa		
2018	Cold Case 2		Episode 1	
2018	Sachiiro no One Room	Older brother		
2020	Awaiting Kirin	Isshiki Fujinaga	Taiga drama	
2020	Followers	Hiraku Noma		
2022	One Night Morning	Murata	Lead role; episode 1	
2023	One Room Angel	Kouki		
2023	YuYu Hakusho	Kazuma Kuwabara		
2024	Tanabata no Kuni	Takashi Higashimaru		
2026	Song of the Samurai	Nagakura Shinpachi		
2026	The Scent of the Wind	Shuichi Makimura	Asadora	

=== Film ===
Year	Title	Role	Notes	Ref.
2016	Life is...			
2016	A.I. Love You	Naoto Aida		
2017	One Week Friends	Hajime Kujō		
2018	River's Edge	Kannonzaki		
2020	Our 30-Minute Sessions	Kōki Shigeta		
2020	Underdog			
2022	My Boyfriend in Orange	Shin'ichirō Kazama		
2023	Shin Kamen Rider	Business Suit Man		
2023	You Made My Dawn	Okazaki		
2024	Dear Family	Hajime Ssasaki		
2024	Hakkenden: Fiction and Reality	Inuyama Dōsetsu		
2025	Wind Breaker	Hajime Umemiya		
