= My Personal Weatherman =

Japanese manga and TV drama

- Cover of the Japanese version, released on November 10, 2020

体感予報 (Taikan Yohō)
- Genre: Boys' love
- Manga
- Written by: Nikke Taino
- Published by: NTT Solmare (digital); Libre (print)
- English publisher: NA: MangaPlaza
- Imprint: BBC Deluxe
- Magazine: Comic CMoa
- Original run: November 21, 2020 – present
- Volumes: 1
- Television drama
- Directed by: Ayaka Katō; Shinju Funabiki; Emi Yasumura
- Written by: Natsuki Takahashi; Shinju Funabiki
- Music by: Ryō Watanabe; Shifumi Kōchi
- Studio: Humax Cinema
- Licensed by: Viki; GagaOOLala
- Original network: MBS
- Original run: August 11, 2023 – October 13, 2023
- Episodes: 8

My Personal Weatherman (Japanese: 体感予報, Hepburn: Taikan Yohō; lit. "Bodily Sensation Forecast") is a Japanese manga series by Nikke Taino. It is serialized in the manga website Comic CMoa since November 21, 2020. A live-action television drama adaptation was broadcast from August 11, 2023, to October 13, 2023, for Drama Shower, a programming block created by MBS in collaboration with Tunku, Kadokawa Corporation's label for live-action boys' love television dramas.

== Plot ==
Shy, introverted Yoh is a struggling ero-manga artist living with his senior from college, Mizuki Segasaki, a popular weatherman from the weather television program Everyday Weather. As a result of living together, Yoh knows Segasaki's true self to be nothing like the gentle and friendly persona that he shows on television. Yoh believes their relationship to be similar to a "slave contract", where Segasaki agrees to give him food and shelter in exchange for housework. This leads Yoh to feel confused whenever Segasaki teases and dotes on him. Segasaki, on the other hand, has always loved Yoh and is patiently waiting for him to return his feelings.

== Characters ==
Yoh Tanada (棚田 葉, Tanada Yō)
Portrayed by: Atsuki Mashiko
Yoh is a shy yet struggling manga artist who draws primarily in the ero-manga genre. His pen name is Dayo (ダヨ). He is concerned over how his manga has received negative reviews.
Mizuki Segasaki (瀬ヶ崎 瑞貴, Segasaki Mizuki)
Portrayed by: Kouhei Higuchi
Segasaki is a handsome, popular weatherman featured on the weather television program Everyday Weather. He is Yoh's senior from college, and unlike the charming personality he portrays in public, Yoh knows him to be selfish.
Man (万さん, Man-san)
Portrayed by: Sayuri Matsumura
Known by her pen name Manjū (万十), Man is Yoh's older friend who is an otaku and a dojinshi artist. She has a positive personality. Man is also a huge fan of Segasaki. In the television drama adaptation, she is given the full name Kanami Matsudaira (松平 可奈美, Matsudaira Kanami).

== Media ==
=== Manga ===
My Personal Weatherman is written and illustrated by Nikke Taino. It is serialized in the manga website Comic CMoa since November 21, 2020, by NTT Solmare under the Ficus label. The chapters were later released in a bound volume by Libre under the BBC Deluxe imprint. NTT Solmare also released the series in English digitally through MangaPlaza.

In 2023, Taino stated in an interview with Comic CMoa that the concept of the story came from the idea that eroticism can be found in situations outside of sexual activity, which is shown in how Yoh feels aroused at the thought of sunny days. Taino also said because the manga was originally drawn with the intention of it being performed at an event by voice actors, they decided to focus on having implicit sexual depictions instead of more explicit scenes. The story was temporarily given the title Outside of Sex (えっちの外側, Ecchi no Sotogawa) prior to finalization. Taino's favorite scene in My Personal Weatherman is when Segasaki takes care of Yoh after the latter loses his job in chapter 3, such as when Segasaki helps Yoh drink through mouth-to-mouth transfer.

No.	Japanese release date	Japanese ISBN
1	November 10, 2020	978-4799760086

=== Television drama ===
A live-action television drama adaptation of My Personal Weatherman was announced in July 2023. It was broadcast on MBS from August 11, 2023, (Note: MBS lists the broadcast date as August 10, 2023, at 25:29, which is August 11, 2023, at 1:29 AM.) to October 13, 2023, as part of their Drama Shower, a programming block created by MBS and Tunku (a label of Kadokawa Corporation specializing in live-action boys' love television dramas). In addition to MBS, the series was also broadcast on TV Kanagawa, Gunma TV, Tochigi TV, TV Saitama, and Chiba TV. Overseas, it is streamed with English subtitles on GagaOOLala. The series is directed by Ayaka Katō, Shinju Funabiki, and Emi Yasumura. Natsuki Takahashi and Shinju Funabiki are in charge of writing the script. Ryō Watanabe and Shifumi Kōchi are in charge of music composition. The series consists of 8 episodes, including an original story written by the series creator, Nikke Taino.

The series stars Kouhei Higuchi as Mizuki Segasaki and Genic member Atsuki Mashiko as Yoh Tanada. The two had previously co-starred in Avataro Sentai Donbrothers VS Zenkaiger, a crossover between Avataro Sentai Donbrothers and Kikai Sentai Zenkaiger. Additional cast members include Sayuri Matsumura as Kanami Matsudaira (Man) and Atomu Mizuishi as Atsuya Matsudaira, an original character made for the television drama who serves as Man's husband. The opening theme song is "Träumerei" by Gang Parade, and the ending theme song is "Nostalgia" by Absolute Area.

The role of Segasaki was Higuchi's second starring role after Avataro Sentai Donbrothers. He expressed that the role of Segasaki was challenging for him because the character was a "good-looking guy" and that he was worried about conveying the character's charms to fans of the manga. To draw out Segasaki's "sexiness" and "coolness", Higuchi stated that he was careful about using his voice in a way that would show sex appeal. In preparation for his role, he studied about weather through reference books and learning from a weather forecaster. Higuchi and Mashiko also stated that several intimate scenes were created "on the spot" during filming.

No.	Title	Directed by	Written by	Original release date
1	"Episode 1"; Transliteration: "Dai-ichi-wa" (Japanese: 第1話)	Ayaka Katō	Natsuki Takahashi	August 11, 2023
Three years after Segasaki, Yoh's senior from college and a popular weather forecaster, invited him to live with him, Yoh spends his days struggling as a manga artist and pondering about the nature of his relationship with Segasaki. Yoh believes their relationship to be a "slave contract", where Segasaki provides shelter in exchange for Yoh following his directions. Segasaki also has a strange stipulation where he will only have sex with Yoh before sunny days. Once a sunny day takes place, Yoh and Segasaki share some intimacy, but the next day, Yoh learns that the weather has entered a rainy season.
2	"Episode 2"; Transliteration: "Dai-ni-wa" (Japanese: 第2話)	Ayaka Katō	Natsuki Takahashi	August 18, 2023
As Segasaki works overtime, Yoh begins feeling frustrated at how emotionally distant Segasaki is, made worse by a new attractive forecaster, Aika Hiyoshi, joining Segasaki's program. Once Segasaki is able to come home early, Yoh vents at how he is making him upset. Segasaki reveals the reason why they have sex before sunny days was because Yoh complained about cleaning the sheets during their first time together.
3	"Episode 3"; Transliteration: "Dai-san-wa" (Japanese: 第3話)	Shinju Funabiki	Natsuki Takahashi	September 1, 2023
On his day off, Segasaki takes Yoh on an outing around Yokohama. Yoh questions if the outing is a date, as well as his feelings for him. At the end of the day, Yoh buys new sheets for the apartment, solving a hurdle in their intimate relationship. Though Yoh is unable to admit he enjoys Segasaki's company, Segasaki notices it immediately.
4	"Episode 4"; Transliteration: "Dai-yon-wa" (Japanese: 第4話)	Emi Yasumura	Shinju Funabiki	September 8, 2023
Yoh is asked by Man to help her with her dojinshi at her house, but a jealous Segasaki orders him to stay home and cancel their meeting. Man visits Yoh herself and becomes starstruck when she sees Segasaki, having been a longtime fan of his. During dinner, Yoh becomes envious himself when he sees Man and Segasaki having a lively conversation and drunkenly clings onto Segasaki when he offers to accompany Man home.
5	"Episode 5"; Transliteration: "Dai-go-wa" (Japanese: 第5話)	Emi Yasumura	Shinju Funabiki	September 15, 2023
Yoh falls into a slump after he is dropped from his publisher. To his surprise, Segasaki dotes and takes care of him for the rest of the evening. The next day, Man hires Yoh to become an assistant for her newest dojinshi, Oshi Kare!, which is based on his relationship with Segasaki. When Yoh is about to leave for Man's house, he and Segasaki get into an argument, with Yoh feeling as though Segasaki doesn't see him as his equal, while Segasaki fears Yoh will leave him. As Yoh departs, Segasaki slips a GPS tracker into his bag.
6	"Episode 6"; Transliteration: "Dai-roku-wa" (Japanese: 第6話)	Shinju Funabiki	Shinju Funabiki	September 29, 2023
Yoh goes to Man's house to help her work on her dojinshi. While talking to her husband, Atsuya, he reflects on the first time he and Segasaki met in college: he had been drawn towards Segasaki's appearance and had drawn him several times before Segasaki had reached out to him. To inspire Yoh, Atsuya creates several romantic poses with him, to which they are discovered by Segasaki when he arrives. Segasaki takes Yoh home, jealous of Yoh's relationship with Atsuya, while Yoh believes Segasaki is upset about the manga.
7	"Episode 7"; Transliteration: "Dai-nana-wa" (Japanese: 第7話)	Shinju Funabiki	Shinju Funabiki	October 6, 2023
Man's dojinshi is finally complete, though Yoh and Segasaki's relationship has gotten awkward. Segasaki dreams about the time when he and Yoh first met in college: uninterested in his friend group, he noticed Yoh was always looking at him. As Yoh was able to see his true self and took care of him when he was sick, Segasaki realized his feelings for him. After waking up, Segasaki discovers Yoh is missing and suspects he snuck off to Man's house again, but he finds him on the rooftop during a typhoon taking the laundry inside. In fear of losing him, Segasaki ties Yoh up in his room.
8	"Episode 8"; Transliteration: "Dai-hachi-wa" (Japanese: 第8話)	Ayaka Katō	Natsuki Takahashi	October 13, 2023
Through Segasaki's jealousy of his friendships with Man and Atsuya, Yoh realizes his presence is important to him. Yoh catches a cold afterwards, causing Segasaki to nurse him during the day. When Man calls Yoh, Segasaki discovers and reads the dojinshi, realizing how Yoh sees their relationship. That evening, Segasaki asks Yoh to make curry and says he will allow him to meet with his friends as long as Yoh welcomes him back home every day.

=== Drama CD ===
An audio drama adaptation of the manga was announced on August 14, 2023, starring Yūki Ono as Segasaki and Masahiro Yamanaka as Yoh.

== Reception ==
My Personal Weatherman received more than 10 million downloads on the manga service website Comic CMoa. It also won the 2023 Digital Comic Award by Comic CMoa in the BL category along with Takara's Treasure by Minta Suzumaru and Best Comic at the 2023 Chil Chil BL Awards.

For the television drama adaptation, The Television praised Segasaki and Yoh's emotional chemistry. At the time of its release, it was the most viewed series on GagaOOLala.
