= One Room Angel =

Japanese manga series

- Cover of the Japanese version, released on March 25, 2019

ワンルームエンジェル (Wan Rūmu Enjeru)
- Genre: Boys' love
- Manga
- Written by: Harada
- Published by: Shodensha
- English publisher: NA: Futekiya
- Imprint: On BLUE Comics
- Magazine: On BLUE
- Original run: October 25, 2017 – December 25, 2018
- Volumes: 1
- Television drama
- Directed by: Yūka Eda
- Produced by: Yuna Kamiura; Shō Sejima
- Written by: Aya Watatane
- Music by: Tomohide Harada
- Licensed by: Viki
- Original network: MBS TV
- Original run: October 20, 2023 – November 24, 2023
- Episodes: 6

One Room Angel (Japanese: ワンルームエンジェル, Hepburn: Wan Rūmu Enjeru) is a Japanese manga series by Harada. It was serialized in the bimonthly boys' love manga magazine On BLUE from October 25, 2017, to December 25, 2018. The series is a remake of Harada's 2013 short story Tomarigi (止まり木).

A live-action television drama adaptation was broadcast from October 20, 2023, to November 24, 2023, for Drama Shower, a programming block created by MBS TV in collaboration with Tunku, Kadokawa Corporation's label for live-action boys' love television dramas.

== Plot ==
Kouki is a convenience store employee with no ambition in life. He lives alone in a shabby one-room apartment and is unable to get another job due to his appearance and past criminal record. One night, while dealing with unruly customers at his job, Kouki is stabbed, but upon falling unconscious, he sees an angel fall from the sky. Kouki later finds the angel in his apartment with no memories of his previous life, as well as being unable to fly. The angel claims that his wings can only heal from Kouki's positive emotions and promises to help him get his life back on track in exchange for food and shelter.

Kouki is fired from his job due to the stabbing incident, and the angel attempts to give Kouki advice on finding a new job. Meanwhile, Kouki also seeks financial aid from his estranged mother, Arisa, while sharing how his past criminal jobs wound up with his younger brother, Tomoki, being forced into the yakuza. Later, the angel discovers that he had died from jumping from his home above convenience store on the night Kouki was stabbed, and that no one but Kouki is able to see him.

After talking to the convenience store manager and the angel's father, Kouki and the angel crack the password to the angel's former social media account. Together, they learn that the angel's true name is Takashi Takashina, who had been bullied by a popular boy at his middle school, Boy A. During a class field trip, Boy A had made sexual advances on him, but he later fell from a window by accident and died. Takashi was subsequently blamed for Boy A's death, causing him to later die by suicide. Finding closure with his death, the angel realizes that being with Kouki helps him feel loved and confesses his feelings for him.

As Kouki and the angel go on more outings together, one day, the angel suddenly disappears with his wish fulfilled. Kouki falls into depression, but he finds a feather from the angel's wings in his apartment, which makes him realize his relationship with the angel was real and inspires him to move on with his life. He gets a job with a moving company, and he reconciles with Tomoki. Kouki understands that, through his time with the angel, life is worth living. In the epilogue, Kouki reunites with the angel in death.

== Characters ==
Kouki (幸紀, Kōki)
Voiced by: Tomokazu Sugita (audio drama), Portrayed by: Shuhei Uesugi (TV drama)
Kouki is a convenience store employee in his 30s who has no direction in life.
Angel (天使, Tenshi)
Voiced by: Shouta Aoi (audio drama), Portrayed by: Takuya Nishimura (TV drama)
The angel is a mysterious boy with wings who has lost his memories and cannot fly. The angel has a beautiful appearance, but he is also cheeky and says crass words.
Arisa (あり紗)
Portrayed by: Kyōko Hasegawa (TV drama)
Arisa is Kouki's mother.
Boy A (A君, A-kun)
Portrayed by: Kōki Tanaka (TV drama)
"Boy A" is a popular boy in the angel's class during his past life.
Convenience store manager (コンビニの店長, Konbini no Tenchō)
Portrayed by: Oideyasu Oda (TV drama)
The convenience store manager, whose name is never revealed in the series, is Kouki's boss. He later fires Kouki from the job.
Takako (タカコ)
Takako is a girl in the angel's class during his past life.

== Media ==
=== Manga ===
Harada wrote and illustrated a short story titled Tomarigi (止まり木), which was serialized in B-Boy Chō Kichiku Elite Ryōjoku Tokushū, a boys' love manga anthology that was released on July 31, 2013, as part of Libre Publishing's Magazine Be × Boy brand. It was compiled in Hen'ai (変愛), an anthology of Harada's other short stories, by Libre Publishing on January 23, 2014, under the Citron Comics imprint. The story sees a man who meets an angel and helps him heal his wings through sexual intercourse. Harada later decided to remake the story, leading to the creation of One Room Angel.

One Room Angel is serialized in the bimonthly boys' love manga magazine On BLUE from vol. 31 released on October 25, 2017, to vol. 38 released on December 25, 2018. The chapters were later released in one bound volume by Shodensha under the On BLUE Comics imprint.

In August 2020, Futekiya announced that they would distribute the manga in English on their website. The manga is currently distributed by Manga Planet since their merger with Futekiya and was released in December 2020.

No.	Original release date	Original ISBN	English release date	English ISBN
1	March 25, 2019	978-4396784751	December 2020	—

=== Audio drama ===
An audio drama was released onto CD by Marine Entertainment on June 27, 2020. The audio drama stars Tomokazu Sugita as Kouki and Shouta Aoi as the angel. Upon its release, it charted at no. 38 on the Oricon Weekly Albums Chart.

=== Television drama ===
A live-action television drama adaptation of One Room Angel was announced on September 26, 2023. The series was broadcast from October 20, 2023, (Note: MBS lists the broadcast date as October 19, 2023, at 25:29, which is October 20, 2023 at 1:29 a.m.) to November 24, 2023, on Drama Shower, a programming block created by MBS and Tunku (a label of Kadokawa Corporation specializing in live-action boys' love television dramas). In addition to MBS, the series was also broadcast on TV Kanagawa, Gunma TV, Tochigi TV, TV Saitama, and Chiba TV. It was streamed internationally with English subtitles on Viki.

The television drama adaptation is directed by Yūka Eda, with Aya Watatane in charge of the script. Yuna Kamiura and Shō Sejima served as producers for the series. Kamiura selected One Room Angel to be adapted for Drama Shower after reading the manga, stating that she felt that the "delicate" themes of "growth" were "appealing" and would be a different approach compared to the previous drama adaptations that were broadcast on Drama Shower. In addition, Eda tried to portray the tone of the story with different camera angles compared to the manga, while "respecting the worldview" of Harada. She also stated she directed the series with intention to have the audience rewatch for subtle hints, such as Kouki's apartment becoming cleaner throughout his time spent with the angel.

The series stars Shuhei Uesugi as Kouki and Lil Kansai (a pre-debut group from Kansai Johnny's Jr.) member Takuya Nishimura as the angel. As Kouki was a character in his 30s, Kamiura did not want to cast someone younger, and Uesugi was Eda's first choice for the role. Likewise, Nishimura was Kamiura's first choice for the role of the angel when the drama adaptation was in its planning stage a year prior to the show's broadcast because he was a "visual match" for the character and she felt that he could portray the angel's "cheekiness" well. Eda wanted the movements of the angel's wings to be realistic and the movements to reflect the angel's emotions, so instead of using CGI animation, the production team decided to construct the wings as a physical prop. Taiga Ishino was in charge of making the wings, and it took him approximately one month to complete them. Filming took place during the summer.

The supporting cast includes Kyōko Hasegawa as Arisa, Kōki Tanaka as Boy A, and Oideyasu Oda as the convenience store manager. Eda felt Tanaka's character, Boy A, was "challenging" in that the character's true emotions were different from what he said, and she focused on capturing Tanaka's facial expressions. The convenience store manager originally spoke in standard Tokyo dialect in the manga, but it was changed to Kansai dialect in the drama adaptation at the suggestion of the character's actor, Oda. Kamiura stated that while the character Takako was removed from the drama adaptation, the production team used screen time in scenes where she would have appeared to expand more on Kouki and the angel's past.

The opening theme song is "8th Heaven" by Shouta Aoi, who had previously portrayed the angel in the audio drama CD adaptation. The song and lyrics were composed by Queen Bee vocalist Avu-chan, a close friend of Harada's who had written the song specifically for One Room Angel. The ending theme song is "Kuon" by Sano Ibuki.

==== Episodes ====
No.	Title	Directed by	Written by	Original release date
1	"Meeting"; Transliteration: "Deai" (Japanese: であい)	Yūka Eda	Aya Watatane	October 20, 2023
2	"The Two of Us"; Transliteration: "Futari" (Japanese: ふたり)	Yūka Eda	Aya Watatane	October 27, 2023
3	"Kouki"; Transliteration: "Kōki" (Japanese: こうき)	Yūka Eda	Aya Watatane	November 3, 2023
4	"Tears"; Transliteration: "Namida" (Japanese: なみだ)	Yūka Eda	Aya Watatane	November 10, 2023
5	"Memories"; Transliteration: "Kioku" (Japanese: きおく)	Yūka Eda	Aya Watatane	November 17, 2023
6	"Angel"; Transliteration: "Tenshi" (Japanese: てんし)	Yūka Eda	Aya Watatane	November 24, 2023

== Reception ==
In 2019, One Room Angel was listed as no. 3 in a list of top 10 BL manga published in Kono BL ga Yabai! In 2020, One Room Angel was listed at no. 13 in a list of top 10 manga for female readers in the 2020 edition of Kono Manga ga Sugoi! One Room Angel won Best Comic in the 2020 Chil Chil BL Awards.

Anime! Anime! and TV Life stated that audience reception to the television drama adaptation was favorable, with praise towards Eda's directing and the angel's wings.
