= Candy Color Paradox =

Japanese manga series

- Cover of the Japanese version's first edition of vol. 1, released on March 30, 2011

飴色パラドックス (Ameiro Paradokkusu)
- Genre: Romantic comedy, boys' love
- Manga
- Written by: Isaku Natsume
- Published by: Shinshokan
- English publisher: NA: SuBLime
- Imprint: Dear+ Comics
- Magazine: Dear+ (2010–2012); Chéri+ (2014–present)
- Original run: December 14, 2010 – present
- Volumes: 8
- Television drama
- Directed by: Tomoyuki Furumaya
- Written by: Miako Tadano
- Studio: Flag Pictures
- Licensed by: Rakuten Viki; GagaOOLala
- Original network: MBS
- Original run: December 15, 2022 – February 10, 2023
- Episodes: 8

Candy Color Paradox (Japanese: 飴色パラドックス, Hepburn: Ameiro Paradokkusu) is a Japanese manga series by Isaku Natsume. It was serialized in the boys' love manga magazine Dear+ from December 14, 2010, to May 14, 2012. The series was later renewed and published in the Spring 2014 issue of Chéri+, where it continues to be serialized irregularly. A live-action television drama adaptation was broadcast from December 15, 2022, to February 10, 2023, for Drama Shower, a programming block created MBS in collaboration with Tunku, Kadokawa Corporation's label for live-action boys' love television dramas.

== Plot ==
Originally a reporter for politics, journalist Satoshi Onoe is suddenly transferred to the celebrity gossip section in the weekly tabloid magazine Dash! and paired with photographer Motoharu Kaburagi, who Onoe views as his rival, as his partner for stake-outs. Onoe and Kaburagi constantly clash with each other from many factors such as Onoe's strong sense of justice, Kaburagi's two-faced and unethical methods of gathering information, and Onoe's ex-girlfriend choosing Kaburagi over him. Over time, Onoe comes to respect Kaburagi as he understands him more, while Kaburagi values Onoe's innocent outlook over journalism. The two eventually fall in love as they continue working together.

== Characters ==
Satoshi Onoe (尾上 聡, Onoe Satoshi)
Voiced by: Takashi Kondō (drama CD), Yusuke Shirai (OVA); Portrayed by: Keito Kimura
Onoe is a reporter for Dash! and has a straight-laced personality. He has a strong sense of justice.
Motoharu Kaburagi (蕪木 元治, Kaburagi Motoharu)
Voiced by: Tomoaki Maeno (drama CD), Junta Terashima (OVA); Portrayed by: Jyutaro Yamanaka
Kaburagi works as a photographer in Dash!, and while he has a cool composure, he also has a kind side that allows him to show consideration for others. Unlike Onoe, Kaburagi will do anything for a scoop and maintains his connections through deceit, bribery, and sex to obtain information. Kaburagi admires Onoe's innocent outlook on journalism and hopes that he will not become as jaded as he is.

== Media ==
=== Manga ===
Candy Color Paradox is written and illustrated by Isaku Natsume. It was serialized in the boys' love manga magazine Dear+ from the January 2011 issue released on December 14, 2010, to the June 2012 issue released on May 14, 2012. Natsume resumed the series beginning with the Spring 2014 issue of Chéri+ released on April 30, 2014, where it continues to be serialized irregularly. The chapters were later released in eight bound volumes by Shinshokan under the Dear+ Comics imprint.

Isaku Natsume Fanbook, a collection featuring Natsume's boys' love works published with Shinshokan, was released on November 30, 2013, and included extra comics consisting of crossovers with Dōshiyō mo Nai Keredo and Tight Rope, her other works. In 2015, the release of vol. 3 of Candy Color Paradox was included in a promotional event where first-press editions were distributed with an extra comic. The first press bonus also included a ticket that allowed customers to apply to purchase an audio drama CD adaptation of Natsume's latest work at the time, Heart no Kakurega. In late October 2015, Natsume's artwork for Candy Color Paradox, as well as Heart no Kakurega, had a feature exhibition at Yurindo Comic Kingdom at Yokohama Station.

On September 15, 2017, Dear+ announced that the tankōbon versions will be released with a new cover design starting with volume 4. The covers for volumes 1 to 3 were also redesigned with new artwork following the announcement.

On August 1, 2018, Viz Media announced that they had licensed the series for North American distribution in English under their SuBLime imprint.

No.	Original release date	Original ISBN	English release date	English ISBN
1	March 30, 2011	978-4-4036-6303-1	March 12, 2019	978-1-9747-0493-4
2	September 29, 2012	978-4-4036-6360-4	June 11, 2019	978-1-9747-0495-8
3	October 30, 2015	978-4-4036-6492-2	September 10, 2019	978-1-9747-0496-5
4	October 2, 2017	978-4-4036-6596-7	December 10, 2019	978-1-9747-0497-2
5	November 1, 2019	978-4403666995	April 13, 2021	978-1-9747-1921-1
6	December 1, 2021	978-4-4036-6793-0	February 14, 2023	978-1-9747-3446-7
7	May 1, 2025	978-4-4036-6986-6	September 8, 2026	978-1-9747-6679-6
8	September 1, 2026	978-4-4036-8072-4	—	—

=== Drama CD ===
Several audio dramas based on each volume of Candy Color Paradox was released by Shinshokan on CD, starring Takashi Kondō as Onoe and Tomoaki Maeno as Kaburagi. The first drama CD was released on July 30, 2011. The second drama CD was released on November 28, 2012. The third drama CD was released on February 26, 2016.

=== OVA ===
Candy Color Paradox: (Secret) Tape was included as part of 6 Lovers, a compilation DVD featuring six anime shorts based on the series from Dear+ as part of the magazine's 20th anniversary. 6 Lovers was released on March 30, 2021. The short stars Yusuke Shirai as Onoe and Junta Terashima as Kaburagi.

=== Television drama ===
On November 13, 2022, Flag Pictures announced that they were producing a live-action television drama adaptation of Candy Color Paradox with 8 episodes planned. The series premiered on December 15, 2022, as the fifth entry of MBS' Drama Shower programming block, with other broadcasts on TV Kanagawa, Gunma TV, Tochigi TV, TV Saitama, and Chiba TV. The series is also streamed on Rakuten Viki and GagaOOLala for English distribution.

The drama adaptation stars Fantastics from Exile Tribe member Keito Kimura as Onoe and Milk member Jyutaro Yamanaka as Kaburagi. The supporting cast includes Atsuki Kashio, Sae Miyazawa, Kenta Izuka, Rinne Yoshida, Tomohiro Ichikawa, Yu Koyanagi, and Ryuichi Ohura. The opening theme is "Go Sign" by Billy Laurent and the ending theme is "Finder" by Claquepot. As the series was broadcast, exclusive behind-the-scenes footage was uploaded weekly on Tunku's (Kadokawa's label for live-action boys' love dramas) Niconico channel.

Isaku Natsume was involved in the scriptwriting process, stating that the writing team had included her opinions in their revisions. Kimura and Yamanaka were familiar with each other after guest-starring in the live-action television drama adaptation of Yakuza Lover together, and Candy Color Paradox is not only their first time starring together, but their first time starring in lead roles. Kimura was instructed by the director to act as though he were having a normal conversation and thus gave a realistic portrayal of Onoe. Kimura also ad-libbed an unspecified scene through gestures.

No.	Title	Directed by	Written by	Original release date
1	"Shot 1"	Tomoyuki Furumaya	Miako Tadano	December 15, 2022
Onoe, a reporter for the weekly magazine Dash!, is transferred to the celebrity gossip column and partnered with Kaburagi. The two are assigned as a stake-out team to find out who Yumi Asaoka, an actress who has appeared in many commercials, is dating. Onoe becomes irritated at seeing Kaburagi switch personalities around others while remaining cold to him, but he also learns that Kaburagi is serious about his work. After Kaburagi takes a photo of Asaoka, Onoe realizes that the man she is with is Kōsei Mano, a yakuza member, deducing that her popularity was influenced by him.
2	"Shot 2"	Tomoyuki Furumaya	Miako Tadano	December 22, 2022
Onoe and Kaburagi stake out to find more compromising photos of Asaoka and Mano. While staking out Asaoka, Kaburagi learns Asaoka is dating Mano in exchange for high-paying jobs to take care of her dementia-ridden mother; however, Onoe is taken into police custody while staking out Mano, forcing Kaburagi to bail him out. The two manage to take a photo of Asaoka hugging Mano and finish the article. Later, Onoe comforts Kaburagi, who feels guilty over ruining Asaoka's career. After this, the two realize they have feelings for each other.
3	"Shot 3"	Tomoyuki Furumaya	Miako Tadano	December 30, 2022 (worldwide); January 5, 2023 (Japan)
While Onoe struggles to come to terms about his feelings for Kaburagi, the two are assigned to investigate Sasagawa, a congressmen rumored to be evading taxes. Through a tip from Kaori, Onoe and Kaburagi meet with Sasagawa's secretary, Suda, while disguised as accountants. Suda confesses to Onoe that Sasagawa is committing fraud by creating fake expenditures. He then forces himself on Onoe, but Kaburagi comes to his rescue. Outside, Kaburagi tells Onoe that he's fallen in love with him.
4	"Shot 4"	Tomoyuki Furumaya	Miako Tadano	January 12, 2023
Weekly Dash! arranges an interview with actor Kei Inami and his younger co-star, Yui Haruta, but Onoe and Kaburagi are also asked to investigate whether Inami and Haruta are in a relationship. Onoe notices that Inami had shown no interest in Haruta after the interview, and he suspects the rumors to be untrue. Meanwhile, he also questions whether Kaburagi is in love with him, as their relationship has not progressed since then.
5	"Shot 5"	Tomoyuki Furumaya	Miako Tadano	January 19, 2023
Inami confesses to Onoe that he is only romantically interested in Inukai, his friend from high school. Onoe becomes convinced that Inami has done no wrong and attempts to convince Kaburagi with such. However, Kaburagi gets information from Kaori that Inami has been trafficking his female co-stars into pornographic films. Before he can inform Onoe, he becomes jealous when he sees him with Inami; however, Onoe admits to Kaburagi that he likes him.
6	"Shot 6"	Tomoyuki Furumaya	Miako Tadano	January 26, 2023
Inami blackmails Kaburagi, threatening to force Onoe into sexual trafficking for his silence. Onoe finds Kaburagi's list of Inami's former co-stars and begins investigating against Kaburagi's suggestion. Eventually, the two find and interview an actress who admits to Inami forcing her into pornography. While the article is being published, Onoe and Kaburagi confront Inami one last time, where he confirms he committed the actions because he wanted to help Inukai. While Onoe is unsure of how much Inami is lying, Kaburagi comforts him, stating that Inami may have been truthful with him.
7	"Shot 7"	Tomoyuki Furumaya	Miako Tadano	February 2, 2023
Onoe and Kaburagi's relationship has been going smoothly, with both planning on moving in together soon. After Onoe exposes a former baseball player for running a phone scam center, Kaburagi becomes disappointed, as he believes Onoe has become comfortable with lying in order to advance his career.
8	"Shot 8"	Tomoyuki Furumaya	Miako Tadano	February 9, 2023
Kaburagi avoids Onoe and suggests that Onoe join the political news division when offered a department transfer, as he feels that working in the celebrity gossip division has corrupted Onoe's innocence. Sumida, the head editor, counters Kaburagi by stating that Onoe is capable of handling traumatic stories, as he has worked on similar topics in the past. With this in mind, Kaburagi and Onoe make up and decide to move in together.

== Reception ==
In December 2022, a cumulative total of over 1.3 million physical copies have been sold in Japan. Media outlets such as Da Vinci and Right Stuf reviewed Candy Color Paradox favorably, stating that the series shows off the appeal of having a bickering couple while also showing that they can come to an understanding and fall in love because of it. In 2016, Candy Color Paradox ranked no. 9 in a list of recommended boys' love titles based on a survey of bookstore employees nationwide in Japan. Rebecca Silverman from Anime News Network praised the story and art, but she also claimed that readers may find the story rushed at times and Onoe irritating.
