= Mr. Unlucky Has No Choice But to Kiss! =

Japanese manga series

- Cover of vol. 1 of the Japanese version, released on May 20, 2020

不幸くんはキスするしかない！ (Fukō-kun wa Kisu Suru Shikanai!)
- Genre: Romantic comedy, boys' love
- Manga
- Written by: Gamoko Tsuyu
- Published by: Libre
- English publisher: NA: Animate International
- Imprint: B-Boy P! Comics
- Magazine: B-Boy P!
- Original run: September 10, 2019 – present
- Volumes: 2
- Television drama
- Directed by: Shū Yoshino
- Written by: Hiroko Kanasugi
- Music by: Moku
- Studio: Video Planning
- Licensed by: Viki; GagaOOLala
- Original network: MBS
- Original run: April 22, 2022 – June 10, 2022
- Episodes: 8

Mr. Unlucky Has No Choice But to Kiss! (Japanese: 不幸くんはキスするしかない！, Hepburn: Fukō-kun wa Kisu Suru Shikanai!) is a Japanese manga series by Gamoko Tsuyu. It was serialized in the boys' love digital manga magazine B-Boy P! since September 2019. A live-action television drama adaptation was broadcast from April 22, 2022, to June 10, 2022, as the first entry for Drama Shower, a programming block created MBS in collaboration with Tunku, Kadokawa Corporation's label for live-action boys' love television dramas.

== Plot ==
Having nothing but bad luck for all his life, college student Kōta Fukuhara maintains a pleasant demeanor on the outside to mask his frustrations with his misfortunes. After a run-in with his popular classmate, Naoya Shinomiya, Kōta learns that Naoya has nothing but good luck all his life, and just by being around him, he can minimize his bad luck. He proposes a friendship with Naoya, but Naoya misinterprets his words as a love confession and assumes they are dating.

== Characters ==
Kōta Fukuhara (福原 幸多, Fukuhara Kōta)
Portrayed by: Ryōsuke Sota
Kōta is a college student who has experienced bad luck for all of his life. He masks his resentful personality with a good-natured demeanor.
Naoya Shinomiya (篠宮 直哉, Shinomiya Naoya)
Portrayed by: Yūsuke Satō
Naoya is Kōta's classmate who has experienced good luck for all of his life. He is popular and good-looking.
Mugi Sasaki (佐々木 麦, Sasaki Mugi)
Portrayed by: Satsuki Nakayama
Mugi is one of Naoya's friends who gets easily excited.
Saku Tsujimura (辻村 朔, Tsujimura Saku)
Portrayed by: Gaku Oshida
Gaku is one of Naoya's friends who has a cool appearance.

== Media ==
=== Manga ===
Mr. Unlucky Has No Choice But to Kiss! is written and illustrated by Gamoko Tsuyu. It is serialized in the boys' love digital manga magazine B-Boy P! since September 10, 2019. After its initial end in May 2020, Tsuyu resumed the manga to coincide with the April 2022 broadcast of the television drama adaptation. The chapters were later released in two bound volumes by Libre under the B-Boy P! Comics imprint. During their Anime Expo 2023 panel, Animate International announced that they licensed the manga.

No.	Japanese release date	Japanese ISBN
1	May 20, 2020	978-4799747834
2	May 19, 2022	978-4799757253

=== Television drama ===
On March 4, 2022, MBS and Tunku (a label of Kadokawa Corporation specializing in live-action boys' love television dramas) announced they were producing a live-action television drama adaptation of Mr. Unlucky Has No Choice But to Kiss! as their first entry for their collaboration programming block, Drama Shower. The series premiered on MBS on April 22, 2022, (Note: MBS lists the broadcast date as April 21, 2022, at 25:29, which is April 22, 2022, at 1:29 AM.) and ended on June 10, 2022. Simultaneous broadcasts also included TV Kanagawa, Chiba TV, TV Saitama, Tochigi TV, and Gunma TV.

The drama adaptation stars Ryōsuke Sota as Kōta Fukuhara and LOL member Yūsuke Satō as Naoya Shinomiya. The supporting cast includes Satsuki Nakayama as Mugi Sasaki and Gaku Oshida as Shō Tsujimura, as well as two original characters with Mei Hata as Miki and Asuka Hanamura as Anna. The opening theme is "Perfect" by Octpath and the ending theme is "Shinu Made Kimi o Shirō" by Touya Kobayashi.

Kaoru Azuma, the creator of Tunku, stated that, despite Mr. Unlucky Has No Choice But to Kiss! being published under a company outside of Kadokawa, she chose it as the first series to adapt. She stated that she had been keeping track of B-Boy P!, as the stories running in the magazine were accessible as entry point for newcomers to the boys' love genre. Azuma mentioned that because Mr. Unlucky Has No Choice But to Kiss! had a lot of comedic value, she had an idea of how she wanted Kōta to be portrayed and that she wanted Tunku's first entry to be a romantic comedy. Azuma stated that she focused on Kōta's two-faced personality as a "selling point" to casting the actor and that she had to make sure the rest of the actors looked "balanced" when they are together.

No.	Title	Directed by	Written by	Original release date
1	"Mr. Unlucky Has No Choice But to Kiss!"; Transliteration: "Fukō-kun wa Kisu Suru Shikanai!" (Japanese: 不幸くんはキスするしかない!)	Shū Yoshino	Hiroko Kanasugi	April 22, 2022
2	"Mr. Unlucky Has No Choice But to Go on a Date on Saturday!"; Transliteration: "Fukō-kun wa Doyō ni Dēto Suru Shikanai!" (Japanese: 不幸くんは土曜にデートするしかない!)	Shū Yoshino	Hiroko Kanasugi	April 29, 2022
3	"Mr. Unlucky Has No Choice But to Go on a Date on Sunday!"; Transliteration: "Fukō-kun wa Nichiyō ni Dēto Suru Shikanai!" (Japanese: 不幸くんは日曜にデートするしかない!)	Shū Yoshino	Hiroko Kanasugi	May 6, 2022
4	"Mr. Unlucky Has No Choice But to Become Roommates!"; Transliteration: "Fukō-kun wa Dōsei Suru Shikanai!" (Japanese: 不幸くんは同棲するしかない!)	Shū Yoshino	Hiroko Kanasugi	May 13, 2022
5	"Mr. Unlucky Has No Choice But to Fall in Love!"; Transliteration: "Fukō-kun wa Koi Suru Shikanai!" (Japanese: 不幸くんは恋するしかない!)	Shū Yoshino	Hiroko Kanasugi	May 20, 2022
6	"Mr. Unlucky Has No Choice But to Confess!"; Transliteration: "Fukō-kun wa Kokuhaku Suru Shikanai!" (Japanese: 不幸くんは告白するしかない!)	Shū Yoshino	Hiroko Kanasugi	May 27, 2022
7	"Mr. Unlucky Has No Choice But to Become His Boyfriend!"; Transliteration: "Fukō-kun wa Koibito ni Naru Shikanai!" (Japanese: 不幸くんは恋人になるしかない!)	Shū Yoshino	Hiroko Kanasugi	June 3, 2022
8	"Mr. Unlucky Has No Choice But to Become Lucky!"; Transliteration: "Fukō-kun wa Shiawase ni Naru Shikanai!" (Japanese: 不幸くんは幸せになるしかない!)	Shū Yoshino	Hiroko Kanasugi	June 10, 2022

== Reception ==
From September 2019 to May 2020, Mr. Unlucky Has No Choice But to Kiss! had at least 2.5 million pageviews. For the live-action television drama, Kaoru Azuma, the creator of Tunku, stated that it was popular among teenagers.
