= Senpai, This Can't Be Love! =

Japanese manga series by Shinta Harekawa

- Cover of vol. 1 of the Japanese version, released on July 16, 2019

先輩、断じて恋では! (Senpai, Danjite Koi de wa!)
- Genre: Romantic comedy, boys' love
- Manga
- Written by: Shinta Harekawa
- Published by: Kadokawa
- English publisher: NA: Yen Press
- Imprint: Fleur Comics
- Magazine: Comic Fleur
- Original run: January 2019 – present
- Volumes: 3
- Television drama
- Licensed by: Viki; GagaOOLala
- Original network: MBS
- Original run: June 17, 2022 – August 12, 2022
- Episodes: 8
- icon

Senpai, This Can't Be Love! (Japanese: 先輩、断じて恋では!, Hepburn: Senpai, Danjite Koi de wa!) is a Japanese manga series by Shinta Harekawa. It is serialized in Kadokawa's boys' love manga website, Comic Fleur, since January 2019. A live-action television drama adaptation was broadcast from June 17, 2022, to August 12, 2022, for Drama Shower, a programming block created MBS in collaboration with Tunku, Kadokawa Corporation's label for live-action boys' love television dramas.

== Plot ==
Atsushi Yanase is a senior CG animator working at a company specializing in CG animation. Having just returned from the United States, Yanase is assigned to look after Yuki Kaneda, a junior employee. Kaneda is a competent worker, but he remains cold to Yanase. Yanase is under the impression that Kaneda hates him, but, to his surprise, Kaneda actually idolizes him and is secretly shy about his feelings towards him.

== Characters ==
Atsushi Yanase (柳瀬 淳, Yanase Atsushi)
Voiced by: Takeo Otsuka
Portrayed by: Shuichiro Naito
Yanase is a senior CG animator who has a "flirtatious" personality.
Yuki Kaneda (金田 優希, Kaneda Yūki)
Voiced by: Junya Enoki
Portrayed by: Toshiki Seto
Kaneda is a junior CG animator who has a "pure" personality and cannot show his emotions easily.

== Media ==
=== Manga ===
Senpai, This Can't Be Love! is written and illustrated by Shinta Harekawa. It is serialized in the boys' love manga website Comic Fleur since January 2019. After its initial end, Harekawa continued the series with Senpai, This Can't Be Love! Brush Up. The chapters were later released in three bound volumes by Kadokawa under the Fleur Comics imprint. Harekawa interviewed several people working in the CG industry while creating the series.

On September 8, 2022, a voice drama adaptation of the manga was posted on Ciel Fleur's YouTube channel, starring Takeo Otsuka as Yanase and Junya Enoki as Kaneda. On January 5, 2024, Yen Press announced that it had licensed the manga for English-language publication.

No.	Title	Original release date	English release date
1	Senpai, This Can't Be Love! Senpai, Danjite Koi de wa! (先輩、断じて恋では！)	July 16, 2019; 978-4-04-065846-9	June 18, 2024; 978-1-9753-8008-3
2	Senpai, This Can't Be Love! Brush up Senpai, Danjite Koi de wa! Brush up (先輩、断じて恋では！Brush up)	September 17, 2020; 978-4-04-064858-3	December 10, 2024; 978-1-9753-8010-6
3	Senpai, This Can't Be Love! Brush Up, Vol. 2 Senpai, Danjite Koi de wa! Brush up 2 (先輩、断じて恋では！Brush up 2)	May 17, 2023; 978-4-04-682436-3	April 29, 2025; 979-8-8554-0201-8

=== Television drama ===
On May 17, 2022, a live-action television drama series adaptation was announced. The series was broadcast from June 17, 2022, (Note: MBS lists the broadcast date as June 16, 2022, at 25:29, which is June 17, 2022, at 1:29 a.m.) to August 12, 2022, on Drama Shower, a programming block created by MBS and Tunku (a label of Kadokawa Corporation specializing in live-action boys' love television dramas). In addition to MBS, the series was also broadcast on TV Kanagawa, Gunma TV, Tochigi TV, TV Saitama, and Chiba TV. It was streamed internationally with English subtitles on GagaOOLala and Viki.

The series stars Shuichiro Naito as Atsushi Yanase and Toshiki Seto as Yuki Kaneda. Kaoru Azuma, the creator of Tunku, stated that Naito was cast because he could portray a "charming" character like Yanase, while Seto was cast because he was able to express emotion well through his "moody gaze". In addition to this, both actors had a strong relationship off-camera. Additional cast members included Satoshi Matsuda as Shunsuke Imaizumi, Shu Watanabe as Hayato Ichikawa, Rikako Sakata as Chise Ōmura, Taisuke Niihara as Haruki Iguchi, Junya Asada as Kōhei Nakamura, and Hitomi uneda as Sakura Tanimoto. The opening theme song is "Follow Your Heart" by Kagami Hayato and Kaida Haru, two members of the Nijisanji VTuber group ROF-MAO, and the ending theme song is "Ato Sū Senchi" by Hilcrhyme.

No.	Title	Original release date
1	"Episode 1"; Transliteration: "Dai-ichi-wa" (Japanese: 第1話)	June 17, 2022
2	"Episode 2"; Transliteration: "Dai-ni-wa" (Japanese: 第2話)	June 24, 2022
3	"Episode 3"; Transliteration: "Dai-san-wa" (Japanese: 第3話)	July 8, 2022
4	"Episode 4"; Transliteration: "Dai-yon-wa" (Japanese: 第4話)	July 15, 2022
5	"Episode 5"; Transliteration: "Dai-go-wa" (Japanese: 第5話)	July 22, 2022
6	"Episode 6"; Transliteration: "Dai-roku-wa" (Japanese: 第6話)	July 29, 2022
7	"Episode 7"; Transliteration: "Dai-nana-wa" (Japanese: 第7話)	August 5, 2022
8	"Episode 8"; Transliteration: "Dai-hachi-wa" (Japanese: 第8話)	August 12, 2022

== See also ==
- Akira Failing in Love, another manga series by the same author
- Three Exorcism Siblings, another manga series by the same author
