= Drama Shower =

Japanese television programming block

- Network: MBS
- Launched: April 22, 2022; 4 years ago
- Closed: April 11, 2024; 2 years ago
- Country of origin: Japan
- Key people: Kaoru Azuma
- Major broadcasting contracts: Kadokawa Corporation
- Format: Boys' love dramas
- Running time: Fridays at 1:29–1:59 AM JST (Note: The timeslot is advertised as "Late Night Thursdays" and listed as Thursdays at 25:29, which is Friday at 1:29 AM.)
- Original language: Japanese

Drama Shower (Japanese: ドラマシャワー, Hepburn: Dorama Shawā) was a Japanese programming block on MBS. The programming block was a collaboration between MBS and Kadokawa's boys' love programming label, Tunku, to broadcast boys' love television drama series published by the latter. Drama Shower was broadcast on Fridays from 1:29 AM to 1:59 AM JST. On March 11, 2024, MBS announced that they would be replacing Drama Shower with the programming block Drama Phil, beginning in April 2024.

== History ==
On March 4, 2022, Kadokawa Corporation announced their new boys' love drama label, Tunku. The label is produced by Kaoru Azuma, a long-time boys' love fan. As Kadokawa had previously published a variety of boys' love manga and novels, Tunku was created with the purpose of bringing live-action drama adaptations of them worldwide. The name "Tunku" was derived from the Japanese onomatopoeia of a beating heart and the label was named such to "deliver the excitement [of a beating heart] to viewers worldwide." Azuma stated that Kadokawa approved of Tunku immediately due to their familiarity with boys' love culture and they soon gained the interest and approval of MBS to broadcast their projects.

On the same day that Kadokawa announced the establishment of Tunku, MBS announced they were creating a programming block in collaboration with the label, titled Drama Shower, in which they would broadcast boys' love drama adaptations published under the Tunku label. Drama Shower would be broadcast every Friday from 1:29 AM to 1:59 AM JST for a limited run of one year. Azuma stated that despite Drama Shower running for one year, she would be interested in continuing Tunku after Drama Shower's end provided Kadokawa still has interest in the project. The first title announced for Drama Shower was Mr. Unlucky Has No Choice But to Kiss!, which began broadcast on April 22, 2022. (Note: Mr. Unlucky Has no Choice But to Kiss! is listed with the premiere date of April 21, 2022 at 25:29, which is April 22 at 1:29 AM.) Despite that the series came from a publisher outside of Kadokawa, Azuma wanted the adaptation to be the first series on Drama Shower because it was seen as accessible to newcomers of the boys' love genre and because it was a romantic comedy. It was followed by Senpai, This Can't Be Love!, Takara-kun & Amagi-kun, Eternal Yesterday, and Candy Color Paradox. In addition to the shows being serialized on Drama Shower, exclusive behind-the-scenes footage of all series would be uploaded onto Tunku's Niconico channel as the episodes aired.

On March 11, 2024, MBS announced that they would be replacing Drama Shower with the programming block Drama Phil, beginning with the broadcast of the television drama Ubawareta Boku-tachi on April 12, 2024.

== Programming ==
- Mr. Unlucky Has No Choice But to Kiss! (2022)
- Senpai, This Can't Be Love! (2022)
- Takane-kun & Amagi-kun (2022)
- Eternal Yesterday (2022)
- Candy Color Paradox (2022–2023)
- Jack Frost (2023)
- Tokyo in April is... (2023)
- My Personal Weatherman (2023)
- One Room Angel (2023)
- Mr. Sahara and Toki (2023–2024)
- My Strawberry Film (2024)
