= Hiroshima Institute of Technology =

Coordinates: 34°22′16″N 132°20′38″E

- 広島工業大学
- Former names: Hiroshima Technical College
- Type: Private
- Established: 1961
- Location: Hiroshima, Hiroshima Prefecture, Japan
- Website: hirokoudai.jp/e/index.html

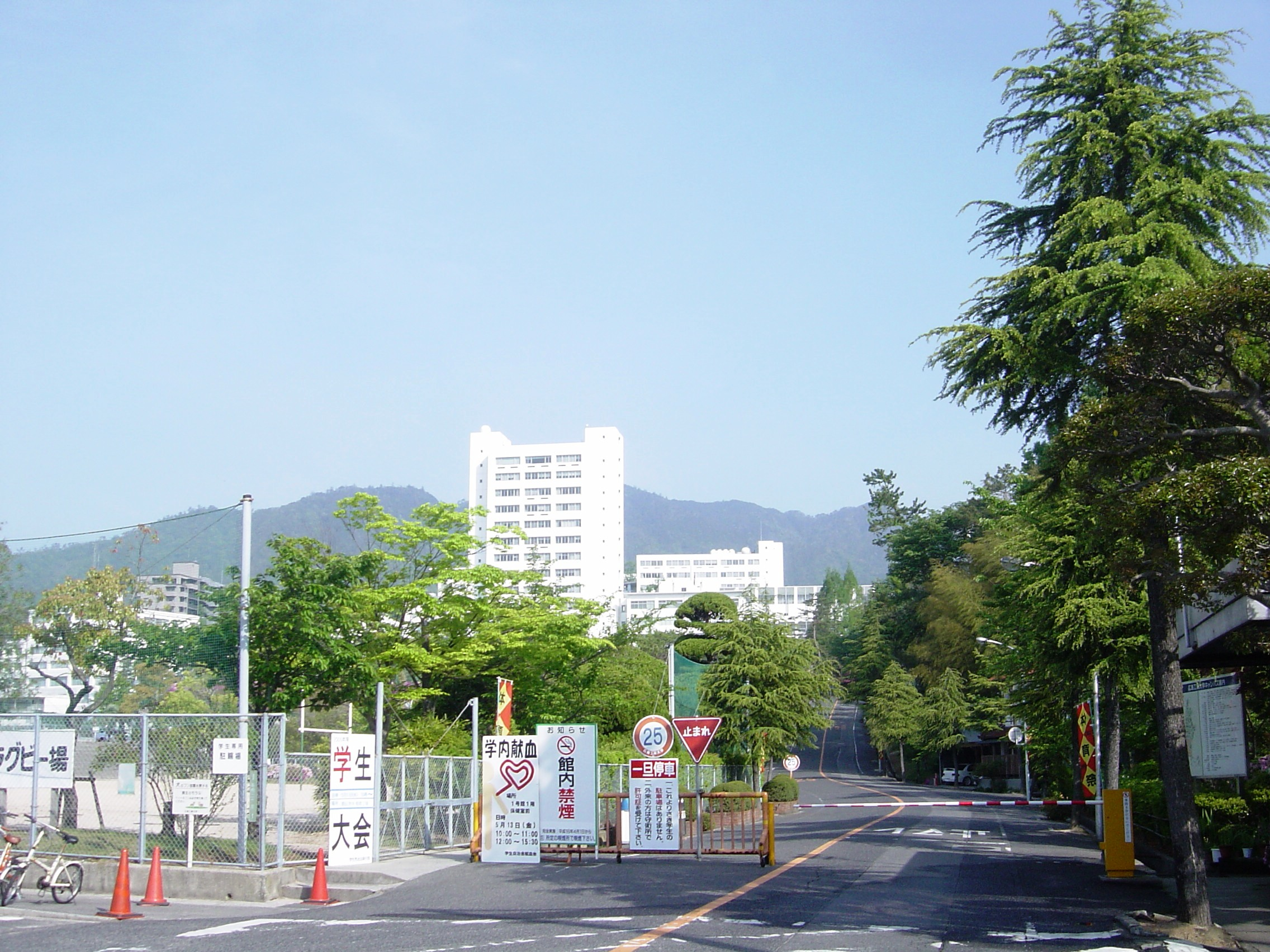
Hiroshima Institute of Technology

Hiroshima Institute of Technology (広島工業大学, Hiroshima Kōgyō Daigaku) is a private university in Saeki-ku, Hiroshima, Japan. It was established by Tsuru Gakuen (founded by Noboru Tsuru) in 1961 as a two-year college, and became a four-year university in 1963, taking its present name.

The university has faculties of engineering, applied information science, and environmental studies.

The university also offers a study abroad program for students at the University of Illinois at Urbana-Champaign and Trinity Western University.
