= Summer Sonic Festival =

Japanese music festival

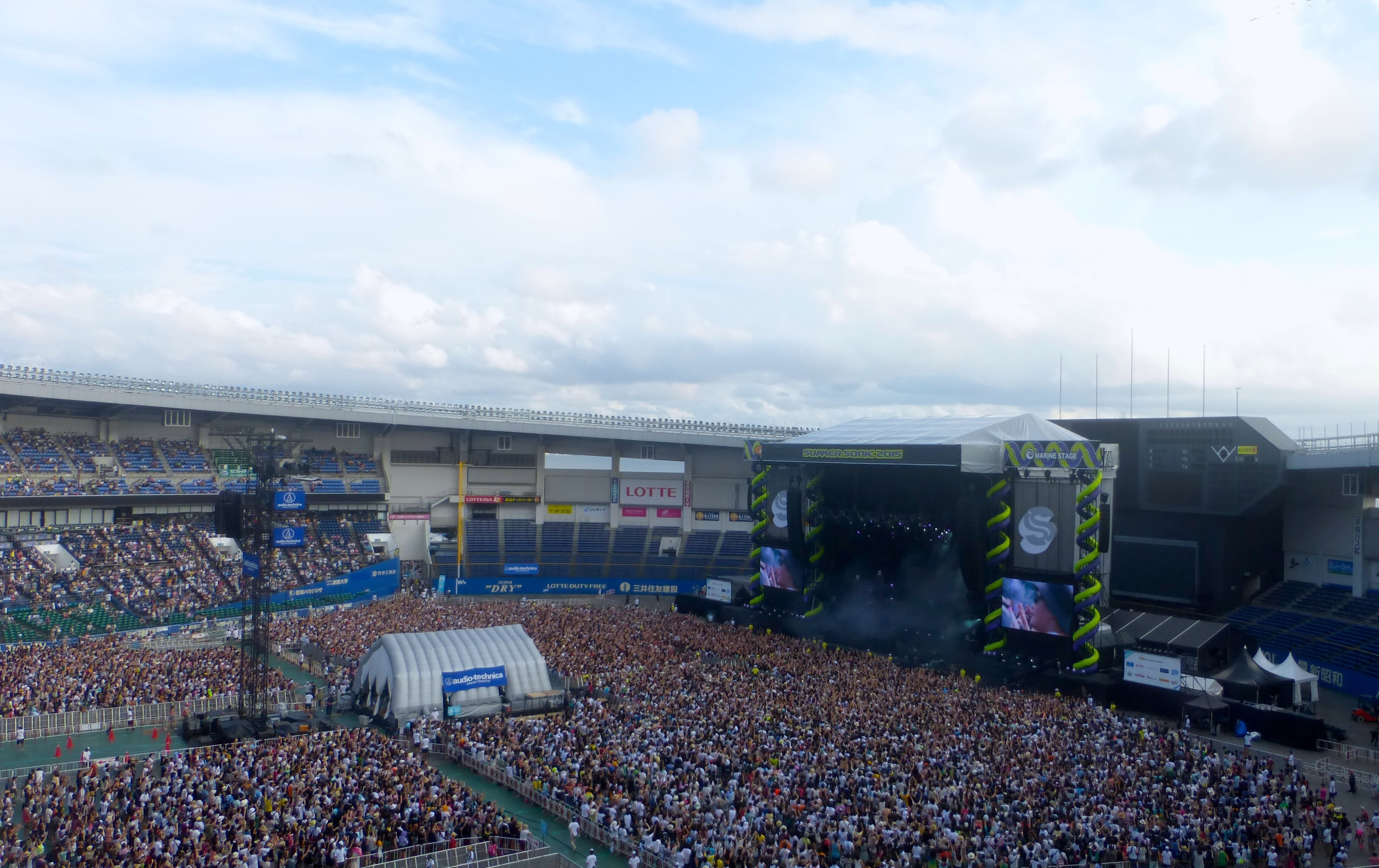
- The Marine Stage at Summer Sonic Tokyo in 2015
- Genre: Rock, alternative, electronic, metal, hip hop and pop
- Dates: August (2000–2019, 2022–); September (2021)
- Locations: Fujiyoshida, Japan (2000) Fuji-Q Highland; Chiba, Japan (2001–present); Zozo Marine Stadium; Makuhari Seaside Park; Makuhari Messe; Toyosuna Park; Osaka, Japan (2000–present); Maishima Sports Island; Fumin Kyosai Super Arena; Maishima Baseball Stadium; Expo Commemoration Park; Shanghai, China (2017); Shen Di Ecology Park; Shanghai International Music Village; Nonthaburi, Thailand (2024–present) Impact Muang Thong Thani Challenger Hall 1–3
- Years active: 2000–2019, 2021–present
- Website: www.summersonic.com

Summer Sonic (サマーソニック, Samā Sonikku) is an annual music festival held on one weekend in August simultaneously in both Chiba (branded as Summer Sonic Tokyo) and Suita (branded as Summer Sonic Osaka), Japan. Organized by Creativeman Productions, Summer Sonic is one of the largest major music festivals in Japan, and features rotating lineups with artists performing one day in Chiba and the following day in Suita, and vice versa. The lineup often features major international acts alongside Japanese artists from major and independent record labels.

The festival was first held in 2000 at the Fuji-Q Highland resort in Yamanashi Prefecture. The festival moved to Chiba in 2001, just east of Tokyo, and has been held simultaneously in Chiba and Osaka since 2002. The festival is often accompanied by separately ticketed overnight events held exclusively in Chiba featuring an EDM-centric lineup, which have been branded variously as Sonicmania or Midnight Sonic. The 2009, 2011 and 2026 editions of the festival were held over three days, while all other editions have been held over two days. International editions of the festival have occasionally been held outside Japan, including Shanghai in 2017 and Bangkok in 2024.

== History ==
Summer Sonic Festival was founded in 2000 in Japan, by Naoki Shimizu, CEO of Tokyo promotions company Creativeman Productions Ltd. Addressing the ever-growing demand for western music, the festival drew established and emerging musical acts of most genres to become, by 2010, Japan's biggest music event.

The Tokyo event takes place at the Makuhari Messe convention center in Chiba City, which overlooks Tokyo Bay, with the main stage located in nearby Zozo Marine Stadium, as well as an additional stage located on Makuhari Beach. In Osaka, the festival was first held at WTC Open Air Stadium before moving to Maishima Sports Island in 2007. In 2024, the Osaka event was moved to Expo Commemoration Park in nearby Suita.

In 2017, Summer Sonic held its first event outside of Japan, taking place in Shanghai, China. Placebo was originally was set to be the headline act for day two, but the band was refused entry into the country by the Chinese government after posting a picture of the Dalai Lama; as a result Travis took their place.

In 2011, the festival established Sonicmania, a separately ticketed overnight event focusing on electronic dance music. It is traditionally held at Makuhari Messe the day before the festival. In some years, the festival has instead featured a similar event named Midnight Sonic, which regular festival ticket holders are also permitted to attend.

In 2019, B'z was announced as the first Japanese headliner in the festival's twenty-year history. Further Japanese headliners have included Ado and L'Arc-en-Ciel, both in 2026.

The 2020 festival was cancelled due to the COVID-19 pandemic. An abridged version of the festival, branded as 'Supersonic', took place in September 2021 with restrictions in place and a typhoon affecting day one. Possibly because of the logistics of moving people around during a pandemic, the 2021 lineup was mainly electronic. Controversy arose when some foreign DJs were allowed to enter Japan without having to quarantine, despite the quarantine requirement for most other international arrivals.

Summer Sonic celebrated its 25th edition of the festival in 2026, returning to a three-day format for the first time since 2019.

== Performances ==
Lineups for the festival in past years are as follows. The artists in bold are the headlining acts for that year.

=== 2000 ===
- 311
- Arrested Development
- At the Drive-In
- Ben Folds Five
- Coldplay
- Dragon Ash
- Eastern Youth
- Oblivion Dust
- Eels
- Glow
- Grandaddy
- **Green Day**
- G-Shock Winner
- James Brown
- **Jon Spencer Blues Explosion**
- Mansun
- Muse
- Quruli
- Reef
- SBK
- Sigur Rós
- Snail Ramp
- Snug
- Supercar
- Tahiti 80
- Teenage Fanclub
- The Bluetones
- The Flaming Lips
- The Living End
- The Mad Capsule Markets
- Triceratops
- Ween
- Weezer

=== 2001 ===
- ...And You Will Know Us by the Trail of Dead
- Air
- **Beck**
- Bilal Oliver
- Cibo Matto
- Cosmic Rough Riders
- Eels
- Elbow
- Gloss
- Incubus
- Jet Black Crayon
- King Adora
- Love Psychedelico
- **Marilyn Manson**
- Matthew Sweet
- Mercury Rev
- MxPx
- My Vitriol
- Ocean Colour Scene
- Primal Scream
- Rancid
- Reel Big Fish
- Rize
- Russell Simins
- Seo Taiji
- Shea Seger
- Skrape
- Slipknot
- Soulwax
- Tahiti 80
- The Cult
- The Living End
- The Mad Capsule Markets
- The Moldy Peaches
- Zebrahead

=== 2002 ===
- A
- Andrew W.K.
- The Avalanches
- Aya (Tokyo only)
- B-DASH (Osaka only)
- Cave In
- Cult of Personality (Tokyo only)
- Disturbed
- Dragon Ash (Osaka only)
- Fake?
- The Flaming Lips (Tokyo only)
- GagagaSP (Osaka only)
- **Guns N' Roses**
- Hanoi Rocks
- Haven
- Hitomitoi (Osaka only)
- Hoobastank
- HY
- The Icarus Line
- The Libertines
- March 25
- Mongol800
- Millionaire
- Morrissey
- múm
- Murderdolls
- NANANINE
- No Doubt
- NOFX
- **The Offspring**
- Ozma
- Pleymo
- Puffy
- Quarashi
- Raging Speedhorn
- The Reindeer Section
- Relish
- Rise From The Dead (Osaka only)
- Rival Schools
- Shaka Labbits loves 175R
- Siouxsie and the Banshees
- Ska Ska Club
- The Skylarks
- Soft Ballet
- The Streets
- Suede
- Vex Red
- Weezer
- The Wildhearts
- Wrench (Tokyo only)

=== 2003 ===
- AFI
- Air
- Alkaline Trio
- Army of Freshmen
- Asian Kung-Fu Generation
- B@by Soul
- Blink-182
- Blondie
- **Blur**
- Buck-Tick
- Cheap Trick
- The Datsuns
- Devo
- DMBQ
- The Doors
- Elephant Kashimashi
- GO!GO!7188
- Good Charlotte
- The Greenhornes
- Heesey with Dudes
- Hermann H. & The Pacemakers
- The High-Lows
- Hot Hot Heat
- HY
- InMe
- Interpol
- Jet-ki
- Blues Explosion
- Kick the Can Crew
- The Kills
- Kings of Leon
- The Living End
- Mando Diao
- The Mars Volta
- Mew
- My Morning Jacket
- New Found Glory
- Orange Range
- Original Love
- The Polyphonic Spree
- Polysics
- Puddle of Mudd
- **Radiohead**
- Rapture
- Razorlight
- The Rocket Summer
- Rooney
- Sons of All Pussys
- Soul'd Out
- Starsailor
- The Star Spangles
- The Strokes
- Stereophonics
- Sugarcult
- Sum 41
- Syrup16g
- Thmlues
- Tokyo Ska Paradise Orchestra
- Travis
- YKZ
- Zebrahead

=== 2004 ===
- 10-Feet
- The All-American Rejects
- Amen
- Avril Lavigne
- **Beastie Boys**
- Beat Crusaders
- Blackmail
- Bloc Party
- Boom Boom Satellites
- Borialis
- Brides of Destruction
- The Bronx
- The Cribs
- Damned
- The Darkness (Cancelled)
- The Dead 60's
- Dirty Americans
- Erskin
- The Faint
- Fountains of Wayne
- The Go-Go's
- **Green Day**
- The Hives
- Hoobastank
- Hope of The Saints
- IMA Robot
- Jude
- Junior Senior
- Jurassic 5
- Kasabian
- Koshi Inaba
- Lee Scratch Perry
- Living Things
- locofrank
- Lordz of Brooklyn
- Lostprophets
- The Mad Capsule Markets
- Mad Professor
- Mando Diao
- MC5/d.k.t.
- Midtown
- The Music
- My Chemical Romance
- Nas
- N.E.R.D
- Oceanlane
- Orange Range
- The Ordinary Boys
- Peaches
- Pennywise
- Phantom Planet
- Razorlight
- Rhymester
- Secret Machines
- Silvertide
- Sketch Show
- smorgas
- Sum 41
- TMG
- Tommy Heavenly 6
- The Veils
- Whyte Seeds
- Zebrahead

=== 2005 ===
- Afra & Incredible Beatbox Band
- Ai
- alexisonfire
- Arcade Fire
- Asian Kung-Fu Generation
- Attach Haus
- Beat Crusaders
- Be Your Own Pet
- Billy Talent
- The Black Crows
- Bloc Party
- Blue-Eyed Son
- Boy
- Buckcherry
- Bullet for My Valentine
- Caesars
- Citizen Cope
- Death Cab for Cutie
- Deep Purple
- Def Tech
- The Departure
- Detroit 7
- DJ Akakabe
- Doping Panda
- Duck Rock
- Duran Duran
- Echo & the Bunnymen
- Eighteen Visions
- Ellegarden
- Fightstar
- Fire Ball with Jungle Roots Band
- Flipsyde
- Freenote
- Great Adventure
- HAL
- Halfby
- Her Space Holiday
- HIM
- Home Made
- Ian Brown
- I-DEP
- Inme
- Interpol
- Johnny Panic
- K-Switch
- Kasabian
- Kelson & Caravan
- The La's
- Little Barrie
- The Little Flames
- Louis XIV
- The Mad Capsule Markets
- Me First and the Gimme Gimmes
- MEW
- M.I.A.
- The Micteeth
- Mo'Some Tonebenders
- Natsumen
- **Nine Inch Nails**
- No Warning
- **Oasis**
- Orange Pekoe
- Orange Range
- The Ordinary Boys
- The Others
- The Phanky Okstra
- Polysics
- Public Enemy
- Puffy AmiYumi
- Q-Tip
- Radwimps
- The Rakes
- Rammstein (Cancelled)
- Ramrider
- Rhymester
- Rip Slyme
- RIZE
- Roddy Frame
- Rooster
- The Roots
- Ryukyudisko
- Sakerock
- Shin Nishimura
- Slightly Stoopid
- Slipknot
- The Special Beat
- Steph Pockets
- Straightener
- Sugiramn
- Teenage Fanclub
- The Subways
- The Tears
- Tommy Guerrero
- Towers of London
- Tuff Session
- TV on the Radio
- Weezer
- Yellowcard
- Zazen Boys

=== 2006 ===
- 10 Years
- 65daysofstatic
- AFI
- The All-American Rejects
- Amusement Parks on Fire
- Avenged Sevenfold
- Blindspott
- The Cardigans
- The Cat Empire
- The Charlatans
- Daft Punk
- Daniel Powter
- Deftones
- DJ Shadow
- Editors
- Ellegarden
- El Presidente
- Fall Out Boy
- The Feeling
- The Flaming Lips
- Fort Minor
- Hawthorne Heights
- Hoobastank
- The Kooks
- **Linkin Park**
- Lostprophets
- Massive Attack
- Matisyahu
- **Metallica**
- Muse
- My Chemical Romance
- Phoenix
- The Polyphonic Spree
- Polysics
- Puffy AmiYumi
- The Rapture
- Scritti Politti
- She Wants Revenge
- Stone Sour
- Taking Back Sunday
- Tool
- We Are Scientists
- Whirlwind Heat
- Zebrahead

=== 2007 ===
- Avenged Sevenfold
- 120 Days
- Thirty Seconds to Mars
- The Academy Is...
- **Arctic Monkeys**
- Avril Lavigne
- B'z
- **The Black Eyed Peas**
- Bloc Party
- Blue King Brown
- Bonde do Rolê
- Cansei de Ser Sexy
- Cobra Starship
- Cornelius
- Cyndi Lauper
- Digitalism
- Dinosaur Jr
- Does It Offend You, Yeah?
- Ellegarden
- The Enemy
- Enter Shikari
- Fall Out Boy
- The Fratellis
- The Goo Goo Dolls
- Gwen Stefani
- Gym Class Heroes
- Hadouken!
- Hinder
- The Horrors
- Interpol
- José González
- Kasabian
- Klaxons
- LCD Soundsystem
- Locksley
- The Long Blondes
- Madina Lake
- Manic Street Preachers
- Maxïmo Park
- Modest Mouse
- MSTRKRFT
- MxPx
- The Offspring
- OK Go
- Pet Shop Boys
- The Pipettes
- The Polyphonic Spree
- Remioromen
- Sean Lennon
- Sugar Ray
- Sum 41
- The Sunshine Underground
- Tilly and the Wall
- Travis
- The Twang
- Unkle
- Vitalic
- The Young Punx

=== 2008 ===
- 311
- The Academy Is...
- Adele (Cancelled)
- Against Me!
- Alicia Keys
- Band of Horses
- Becca
- Bedouin Soundclash
- Blood Red Shoes
- Boom Boom Satellites
- Cajun Dance Party
- **Coldplay**
- Crystal Castles
- Café Tacuba
- Death Cab for Cutie
- Devo
- Fatboy Slim
- The Fratellis
- Friendly Fires
- Hadouken!
- The Hoosiers
- Hot Chip
- The Jesus and Mary Chain
- Joe Lean and the Jing Jang Jong
- Junkie XL
- Justice
- The Kills
- The Kooks
- Late of the Pier
- The Living End
- Los Campesinos!
- Lostprophets
- Maximum the Hormone
- MAJESTYS
- The Metros
- MGMT
- Mutemath
- Nell
- New Found Glory
- New Young Pony Club
- OneRepublic
- Panic! at the Disco
- Paolo Nutini
- Paul Weller
- Pendulum
- Perfume
- The Prodigy
- Radwimps
- Sex Pistols
- Silversun Pickups
- Spiritualized
- The Subways
- Super Furry Animals
- Skindred
- South Central
- These New Puritans
- The Ting Tings
- Tokyo Police Club
- Trivium
- The Troubadours
- Vampire Weekend
- Vamps
- **The Verve**
- The Wombats
- Xavier Rudd
- Yelle
- Zebrahead

=== 2009 ===
- 65daysofstatic
- Acidman
- The All-American Rejects
- Aloha from Hell
- Aphex Twin
- B'z
- Beat Crusaders
- **Beyoncé**
- The Big Pink
- Birdy Nam Nam
- Boom Boom Satellites
- Boys Like Girls
- Bring Me the Horizon
- Cancer Bats
- Cavalera Conspiracy
- Coldrain
- CSS
- Datarock
- Delphic
- Dragon Ash
- Elephant Kashimashi
- Elvis Costello
- The Enemy
- Enter Shikari
- Five Finger Death Punch
- The Flaming Lips
- Ghostland Observatory
- Gogol Bordello
- Golden Silvers
- Grizzly Bear
- The Hiatus
- Hollywood Undead
- Hoobastank
- The Horrors
- Iglu & Hartly
- In Case of Fire
- Jack Peñate
- Jenny Lewis
- Joan Jett and The Blackhearts
- Kasabian
- Katy Perry (Cancelled)
- Keane
- Kid Sister
- Klaxons
- Kylee
- Kyte
- Lady Gaga
- Lenka
- **Linkin Park**
- Limp Bizkit
- Little Boots
- Mando Diao
- Marié Digby
- Masayoshi Furukawa
- Mastodon
- Matisyahu
- Mercury Rev
- Metronomy
- Mew
- Mogwai
- Mutemath
- **My Chemical Romance**
- N.A.S.A.
- Never Shout Never
- Ne-Yo
- Nine Inch Nails
- Oreskaband
- Paolo Nutini
- Paramore
- Patrick Watson
- Phoenix (Cancelled Osaka)
- Placebo
- The Qemists
- Razorlight
- Red Light Company
- Rin Toshite Shigure
- Saosin
- School of Seven Bells
- Scott Murphy
- Solange Knowles
- Sonic Youth
- Soulwax
- The Specials
- Tahiti 80
- Tame Impala
- The Temper Trap
- Teenage Fanclub
- The Ting Tings
- Tom Tom Club
- Tricky
- Unicorn
- The Vaselines
- The Veronicas
- V V Brown
- War
- Yuksek

=== 2010 ===
August 7 Chiba / August 8 Osaka	August 7 Osaka / August 8 Chiba
3OH!3; A-ha; All Time Low; Atari Teenage Riot (Chiba only); Beat Crusaders; Biffy Clyro; Big Mama; Broadway Calls; Brodinski; Calvin Harris; Champagne; Clammbon; The Courteeners; Eels; Eikichi Yazawa; Elliot Minor; ET-King; Eve; FACT; Fireball with Home Grown; Freebass; General Fiasco; Gildas; Girls; The Hiatus; Jasmine; **Jay-Z**; Keri Hilson; K-OS; Kreva; Kylee; The Maccabees; Nada Surf; Nas; Nickelback; Northern19; The Offspring; Passion Pit; Pavement; Pedro Winter ('Busy-P'); Richard Ashcroft; Rock'A'Trench; The Smashing Pumpkins; Steve Aoki; Tahiti 80; Tamurapan (Canceled); Thirty Seconds to Mars; Totalfat; Uffie; Yes Giantess; The Young Punx	'te; AA=; Ai Kago Jazz -The First Door-; androp; A Tribe Called Quest; Band of Horses; Band of Skulls; Big Bang; Bigelf; Black Rebel Motorcycle Club; Blood Red Shoes; Coheed and Cambria; Darwin Deez; deadmau5 (cancelled); The Devil Wears Prada; Die Antwoord; Dream Theater (Note: The last Dream Theater show with Mike Portnoy on drums); The Drums; Everlast; Everything Everything; Fanfarlo; Free Energy; F.T. Island; Funky Monkey Babys; Hilcrhyme; Hole; Hudson Mohawke; Jason Derulo; Jay'ed; Jonsi; K'Naan; Lecca; Low IQ 01 & Masterlow; Michael Monroe; Monkey Majik; My Passion; One OK Rock; Orianthi; The Pillows; Pixies; Sakanaction; Shinsei Kamattechan; Slash; Steve Appleton; **Stevie Wonder**; Sum 41; Surfer Blood; Surkin; Taylor Swift

=== 2011 ===
August 13 Chiba / August 14 Osaka	August 13 Osaka / August 14 Chiba
Andymori; Arrested Development; Avril Lavigne; The Bawdies; Beady Eye; Beta Wolf; Black Mountain; BoA; Breakbot; Brother; Busy Pictionary; Cage The Elephant; Carte Blanche; Cerebral Ballzy; Champagne; Clementine; Death From Above 1979; Def Tech; The Downtown Fiction; Esben and the Witch; Feadz; Galaxy Express; The Gazette; Gush; The Horrors; Idiotape; Kaela Kimura; Korn; The Love Ningen; The Mars Volta; Miles Kane; The Mirraz; Mutemath; Nico Touches the Walls; OFWGKTA; One Draft; One Night Only; OverTheDogs; Oz; Perfume; The Pretty Reckless; Rip Slyme; SebastiAn; Sharks; **The Strokes**; Sunset Rollercoaster; Taro Kobayashi; These New Puritans; Tinie Tempah; The Ting Tings; Village People; Wreckin Squadd; Ziggy Marley	Black New-new; Bootsy Collins and The Funk U Band; Bow Wow Wow; Crossfaith; Deerhunter; Fact; Fear, and Loathing in Las Vegas; Friendly Fires; The Ghost Spardac; Girls' Generation (Special guest); Gypsy & the Cat; Hollywood Undead; House of Pain; James Blunt; Johnny Saito; The Jon Spencer Blues Explosion; Little Barrie; Maximum the Hormone; Metronomy; Mona; The Morning Benders; Mucc; Muma & Third Party; Negoto; Neon Trees; One Ok Rock; Panic! at the Disco; Pay Money to My Pain; Perdel; The Pop Group; Primal Scream (Osaka only); P.i.L.; Puro Instinct; Queen Sea Big Shark; **Red Hot Chili Peppers**; Rival Sons; Shibusashirazu Orchestra; Smith Westerns; Suede; The Telephones; Totalfat; Tribes; Two Door Cinema Club; Village People; X Japan; Yanokami; Yelle; Zebrahead

=== 2012 ===
August 18 (Chiba)/August 19 (Osaka)	August 19 (Chiba)/August 18 (Osaka)
Adam Lambert; Alexandra Stan; Begin; Bye Bye Octopus; Coldrain; Crystal Castles; Death Cab For Cutie; Franz Ferdinand; Gotye; **Green Day**; Jun Sky Walkers; Kyary Pamyu Pamyu; Lostprophets; Nelly Furtado; NewTank (China); One Ok Rock; Passion Pit; Tavito Nanao; Totalfat; Sigur Rós; The Vaccines	Anna Tsuchiya; Azealia Banks; Babymetal; Calvin Harris; The Cardigans; Cast; Champagne; Fact; Foster The People; Garbage; Gym Class Heroes; Hoobastank; Jamiroquai; Kesha; Lecca; Mao Abe; Mayday; Miliyah Kato; Momoiro Clover Z; New Order; Pay Money to My Pain; Perfume; Pitbull; **Rihanna**; Tears For Fears; Vintage Trouble

=== 2013 ===
August 10 Chiba / August 11 Osaka	August 10 Osaka / August 11 Chiba
Alt-J; Androp; Babymetal; Bastille; Bullet for My Valentine; Champagne; Cheap Trick; The Church; CNBlue; Coldrain; Fall Out Boy; FIDLAR; F.T. Island; The Gazette; The Hiatus; Jake Bugg; Jagwar Ma; Kodaline; Linkin Park; Living Colour; Maximum the Hormone; **Metallica**; Mew; M.I.A.; Nas; One Ok Rock; Stereophonics (Chiba only); The Stone Roses (Osaka only); Volbeat	The 1975 (Chiba only); Babymetal; Big Mama; BiS; Capital Cities; Carly Rae Jepsen; CN Blue; Cyndi Lauper; Denki Groove (Osaka only); Earth, Wind, & Fire; F.T. Island; Fuzzy Control; The Gazette; Hot Chelle Rae; Hunter Valentine; Huwie Ishizaki; Imagine Dragons; John Legend; Johnny Marr; Jon Spencer Blues Explosion (Chiba only); Kavka Shishido; Knock Out Monkey; Man with a Mission; Modestep (Osaka only); Momoiro Clover Z (Chiba only); Mr. Children; **Muse**; Palma Violets; Peace; Pet Shop Boys (Chiba only); The Pillows; The Royal Concept; Scandal (Osaka only); Scott & Rivers; The Smashing Pumpkins; SO.ON Project; TOTALFAT; Two Door Cinema Club; Utopian Committee; Willy Moon; Zebrahead

=== 2014 ===
August 16 Chiba / August 17 Osaka	August 16 Osaka / August 17 Chiba
The 1975; **Arctic Monkeys**; Avenged Sevenfold; Babymetal; The Bots; Childhood; Cibo Matto; Coldrain; Fear, and Loathing in Las Vegas; Ghost; Jamaica; Krewella; Megadeth; Phoenix; Reignwolf; **Robert Plant**; Sky Ferreira; Suicidal Tendencies; Superfly; Telegram; Twenty One Pilots; Vintage Trouble; White Lies	A Great Big World; **Avril Lavigne**; Azealia Banks; Banks; The Bawdies; Ben Watt with Bernard Butler; Charli XCX; Circa Waves; Dreams Come True; Ellie Goulding; The Horrors; Kimura Kaela; Kraftwerk 3-D; Kyary Pamyu Pamyu; Little Mix; Mayday; Metronomy; The Orwells; Pixies; **Queen + Adam Lambert**; Richie Sambora; Robert Glasper Experiment; Sekai no Owari; Timeflies

=== 2015 ===
August 15 Chiba / August 16 Osaka	August 15 Osaka / August 16 Chiba
All Time Low; Androp; Ariana Grande; Babymetal; Best Coast (Chiba only); Bunkface; **The Chemical Brothers**; Circa Waves; Cody Simpson; Dats (Chiba only); Dinosaur Pile-Up; Echosmith; Exile Shokichi (Osaka only); Jon Spencer Blues Explosion; Kazuyoshi Saito (Osaka only); Kodaline; Kyary Pamyu Pamyu; Macklemore & Ryan Lewis; Madeon; Manic Street Preachers; Marilyn Manson; Marmozets; Monoeyes; Palma Violets; The Prodigy (Osaka only); Radwimps (Chiba only); Slaves; Tempura Kidz (Chiba only); Wolf Alice	Ayumikurikamaki (Chiba only); Best Coast (Chiba Only); Bleachers; BTS; Carly Rae Jepsen; Cast; Char (Osaka only); Clean Bandit; D'Angelo and the Vanguard; Generations from Exile Tribe (Chiba only); Golden Bomber (Osaka only); Imagine Dragons; Kana-Boon (Chiba only); Keytalk; Magic!; Modestep; Naoto Inti Raymi (Osaka only); Man with a Mission (Chiba only); Mew; My First Story (Osaka only); Nico & Vinz; Nothing But Thieves; Olly Murs; Passion Pit; **Pharrell Williams**; The Script; Sheppard; Smallpools; Walk the Moon; Zedd

=== 2016 ===
August 20 Chiba / August 21 Osaka	August 20 Osaka / August 21 Chiba
Acid Black Cherry (Osaka only); Aldious (Chiba only); Alesso; Andy Black; At the Drive-In; Babymetal (Osaka only); Billy Talent; Bullet for My Valentine; Charlie Puth; Coldrain (Chiba only); Digitalism; Fergie; Gen Hoshino; Gesu no Kiwami Otome (Chiba only); The Trio Project feat. Anthony Jackson & Simon Phillips (Osaka only); Joy Opposites; Little Glee Monster (Osaka only); NOISEMAKER (band)|NOISEMAKER (Osaka only); The Offspring; Panic! at the Disco; Pentatonix; PVRIS; R5; Rat Boy; The Struts; Tonight Alive; **Underworld**; Wednesday Campanella (Chiba only); Weezer	The 1975; Alexandros; Blossoms; Cashmere Cat; Elle King; Flo Rida; Gotch (Osaka only); Haruhi (Chiba only); The Jacksons; James Bay; King; Mark Ronson; Mayer Hawthorne; Metafive (Chiba only); Misia (Osaka only); MØ; Nothing But Thieves; POP ETC; **Radiohead**; Run River North; Sakanaction; Shadows (Chiba only); Suede; Sunflower Bean; Two Door Cinema Club; The Yellow Monkey

=== 2017 ===
August 19 Chiba / August 20 Osaka	August 19 Osaka / August 20 Chiba	August 26 Shanghai / August 27 Shanghai
Above & Beyond; 5 Seconds of Summer; The Black Eyed Peas; Blood Orange; **Calvin Harris**; Charli XCX; Communions; Pikotaro; Declan McKenna; Denki Groove (Osaka only); Dua Lipa; Elephant Kashimashi; Gesu no Kiwami Otome (Osaka only); Hey Violet; High Tyde; José James; Justice; Kasabian (Chiba only); Kungs; LANY; Lenny Code Fiction; Liam Gallagher (Osaka only); Phoenix; Suchmos (Chiba only); Sundara Karma; Tsuyoshi Domoto; Uverworld; Yasutaka Nakata & Kyary Pamyu Pamyu; Zara Larsson	All Time Low; Axwell and Ingrosso; Babymetal; BLUE ENCOUNT; Circa Waves; Daya; Fear, and Loathing in Las Vegas; **Foo Fighters**; The Fratellis; G-Eazy; Good Charlotte; Granrodeo (Osaka only); Inaba/Salas; Jasmine Thompson; Kesha; Little Glee Monster; Man with a Mission; Maximum the Hormone (Osaka only); Monsta X; New Found Glory; Nothing's Carved in Stone (Osaka only); Passcode; Pennywise; Rick Astley; Royal Blood; The Struts; Sum 41; SWMRS; Totalfat (Chiba only)	831; Aldious; Alexis Kings; Alisa; Band-Maid; Ben Gold; Chang Chen-yue; David Gravell; Dirty Loops; Eva; G.F.E.T.; GG MAGREE; Hua Chenyu; KhoMha; Inaba/Salas; Ko Chih Tang; The Kooks; Lady Bee; Liang Bo; **Luna Sea** (Day 1); Marlo; MC HotDog; DJ Mena|Mena; Nothing But Thieves; →Pia-no-jaC←; Reatmo; Rokon Time; Ruben De Ronde; Stafford Brothers; Sum 41; SVGV; SWAY; Tetsuya Komuro; Tez Cadey; **Travis** (Day 2); Wagakki Band; Yoja; Zhu Jingxi

=== 2018 ===
August 18 Chiba / August 19 Osaka	August 18 Osaka) / August 19 Chiba
9mm Parabellum Bullet (Chiba only); Aimyon (Chiba only); Attractions (Osaka only); Back Number; Billie Eilish; Bish (Chiba only); The Bloody Beetroots; Bullet for My Valentine; The Charlatans; Dream Wife; Flying Lotus (Osaka only); Frederic; Friendly Fires; Golden Bomber (Osaka only); Her Name in Blood (Chiba only); IAMDDB; Iri (Chiba only); Kamasi Washington (Chiba only); Kami-sama, I Have Noticed (Chiba only); Kelela; Keytalk (Chiba only); Ling Tosite Sigure (Chiba only); Marian Hill; Marmozets; Marshmello; Mastodon; MOROHA (Chiba only); never young beach; Nine Inch Nails (Osaka only); **Noel Gallagher's High Flying Birds**; Official Hige Dandism (Osaka only); Pale Waves; Polkadot Stingray (Chiba only); Queens of the Stone Age (Chiba only); Ruel; Sayuri (Chiba only); Shawn Mendes; The Sherlocks; Soil & "Pimp" Sessions (Chiba only); Special Others Acoustic; Taichi Mukai; Tame Impala; Ulfuls (Osaka only); Why Don't We; Yogee New Waves; yourness (Osaka only)	Alessia Cara; Band-Maid (Chiba only); The Beat Garden (Chiba only); **Beck**; Chance the Rapper; Chanmina (Chiba only); Clean Bandit (Osaka only); DADARAY (Osaka only); Daoko (Chiba only); Fear, and Loathing in Las Vegas (Chiba only); George Clinton & Parliament-Funkadelic (Chiba only); Greta Van Fleet; Indigo la End (Osaka only); J Balvin; Jess Glynne (Osaka only); Jorja Smith; Knox Fortune (Chiba only); Kyuso Nekokami (Chiba only); Mahousyoujo Ni Naritai (Osaka only); M-Flo (Chiba only); Mike Shinoda; Monkey Majik (Osaka only); My First Story (Chiba only); Naoto Inti Raymi; Nickelback; Nulbarich (Chiba only); One Ok Rock (Osaka only); The Oral Cigarettes; Paramore; Passcode; Petit Biscuit (Chiba only); Portugal. The Man; Ramz; Rekishi (Chiba only); Rex Orange County; RIRI; Sambomaster (Osaka only); SKY-HI & THE SUPER FLYERS (Chiba only); Spyair (Chiba only); St. Vincent; Tavito Nanao (Chiba only); Thundercat (Chiba only); Tom Misch (Chiba only); Endrecheri; Walk the Moon; Xmas Eileen (Osaka only); yonige (Osaka only); Your Song Is Good (Chiba only)

=== 2019 ===
August 16 Chiba / August 18 Osaka	August 17 Chiba / August 16 Osaka	August 18 Chiba / August 17 Osaka
831 (Chiba only); The 1975; Ace Collection (Osaka only); Akiyama Kiiro (Chiba only); Alec Benjamin (Chiba only); Alexandros; Allister (Chiba only); Amazarashi (Osaka only); **B'z**; Bananarama; The Birthday; Bish; Björn Again; Chai (Osaka only); Cheryl Lynn (Chiba only); CreepHyp (Chiba only); The Damned (Osaka only); Endrecheri; Fall Out Boy; Glim Spanky (Osaka only); Grace Carter; HY (Chiba only); Intersection (Chiba only); Juju (Chiba only); Kami-sama, I have noticed (Chiba only); Keytalk (Chiba only); Kyuso Nekokami (Osaka only); Little Glee Monster (Chiba only); Loudness; M-Flo (Chiba only); MGMT (Osaka only); Michael Monroe; Motohiro Hata (Chiba only); My First Story; Pale Waves; Passcode (Chiba only); Psychedelic Porn Crumpets; Regal Lily (Chiba only); RIRI (Chiba only); Rita Ora; Robert Glasper (Chiba only); Sabrina Carpenter; Sam Fender; Scandal (Osaka only); Snow Patrol; The Struts; Supper Moment (Chiba only); Taichi Mukai (Chiba only); Two Door Cinema Club; Wanima (Chiba only); Weezer; Xiao Bing Chih (Chiba only); Yuki	04 Limited Sazabys (Osaka only); 10-Feet; Babymetal; Band-Maid (Chiba only); Bring Me the Horizon; Catfish and the Bottlemen; Cero (Chiba only); Chai (Chiba only); Circa Waves (Chiba only); Coin; The Damned (Chiba only); Deaf Havana (Chiba only); Dizzy Sunfist (Chiba only); Electric Pyramid; Fear, and Loathing in Las Vegas; Foals; Indigo la End (Osaka only); The Interrupters; Kaela Kimura; The Lemon Twigs; Lovebites (Chiba only); Low IQ 01 & the Rhythm Makers (Chiba only); Machine Gun Kelly; Man with a Mission; Maximum the Hormone 2GO!TEN; Milet (Osaka only); NAMBA69 (Osaka only); Naoto Inti Raymi (Osaka only); Official Hige Dandism (Chiba only); Phum Viphurit (Chiba only); Radwimps; Rancid; **Red Hot Chili Peppers**; Robert Glasper (Chiba only); Ryokuousyoku Syakai (Osaka only); Sakura Zensen (Chiba only); Sambomaster (Chiba only); Stamp (Chiba only); suga/es (Chiba only); Super Beaver; Superorganism; Survive Said the Prophet (Osaka only); Tash Sultana; Team Shachi (Osaka only); Telex Telexs (Chiba only); Tokyo Ska Paradise Orchestra (Chiba only); Tom Walker; Totalfat (Chiba only); TRI4TH (Chiba only); Yabai T-Shirts Yasan; Yogee New Waves (Chiba only); Zebrahead	9m88 (Chiba only); Bolbbalgan4 (Chiba only); Ai; Alan Walker; Blackpink (Chiba only); The Boyz; Brockhampton; Cash Cash; **The Chainsmokers**; Chanmina (Chiba only); Chara (Chiba only); Chvrches; Disclosure; Flume; FKJ (Chiba only); Generations from Exile Tribe (Osaka only); Genie High (Osaka only); Jain; King Gnu (Chiba only); Kizuna AI (Chiba only); Kreva; Last Idol (Chiba only); Lolo Zouai (Chiba only); Mahalia; Masayoshi Yamazaki (Chiba only); Milet (Chiba only); Mukai Taichi (Osaka only); Neneh Cherry (Chiba only); Nulbarich; Octavian; Perfume (Chiba only); Polkadot Stingray (Chiba only); PREP (Chiba only); Queen Bee (Chiba only); R3hab; Red Spider (Osaka only); The Regrettes; Se So Neon (Chiba only); Seventeen (Osaka only); Shaed; SIRUP; Sofi Tukker; Stereogirl (Chiba only); Suchmos (Chiba only); The Telephones (Chiba only); Tokimonsta; Topaz Jones (Chiba only); The Vamps; Vickeblanka; Yasutaka Nakata & Kyary Pamyu Pamyu; Zedd

=== 2020 ===
Canceled due to the COVID-19 pandemic.

=== 2021 ===
September 18 Chiba / Osaka Cancelled	September 19 Chiba / Osaka Cancelled
Aurora; Be First; Clean Bandit; Dongurizu; Nicky Romero; Sky-Hi	Alan Walker; Digitalism; Frank Walker; Kyary Pamyu Pamyu; Kygo; NiziU; Perfume; R3hab; Steve Aoki; Takkyu Ishino; Zedd; Zorn

=== 2022 ===
August 20 Chiba / August 21 Osaka	August 21 Chiba / August 20 Osaka
04 Limited Sazabys (Osaka only); **The 1975**; Aimer (Chiba only); Ali (Osaka only); All Time Low; Awesome City Club; Band-Maid (Chiba only); Beabadoobee; Billkin & PP Krit (Chiba only); BLUE ENCOUNT (Chiba only); Chai (Chiba only); Chilldspot (Chiba only); The Cro-Magnons (Chiba only); Cvlte; Fear, and Loathing in Las Vegas (Chiba only); Fishbone; Hentai Shinshi Club (Chiba only); Hyde (Chiba only); Kacey Musgraves; Ken Yokoyama (Osaka only); King Gnu; Kirinji; The Libertines; The Linda Lindas; Måneskin; Man with a Mission (Chiba only); Maximum the Hormone (Chiba only); Mirror (Chiba only); Mrs. Green Apple; My Hair Is Bad (Osaka only); never young beach (Chiba only); Novelbright (Chiba only); Nulbarich (Osaka only); The Offspring; Raise A Suilen (Chiba only); Regal Lily (Chiba only); Sambomaster (Chiba only); Seori (Chiba only); Sparks (Osaka only); Squid; St. Vincent; The Struts; Subaru Shibutani (Chiba only); Tahiti 80 (Chiba only); Vaundy (Chiba only); WonFu (Chiba only); yonawo (Chiba only)	Asian Kung-Fu Generation; Be First; Carly Rae Jepsen; Chanmina; chelmico (Chiba only); CL; Def Tech (Chiba only); Easy Life; Endrecheri (Chiba only); Gesu no Kiwami Otome (Osaka only); Griff; Hitsujibungaku (Chiba only); Inhaler; iri (Chiba only); KANDYTOWN (Chiba only); Kasabian (Osaka only); Kreva (Osaka only); Kula Shaker; Kyary Pamyu Pamyu; Liella! (Chiba only); Mononkul (Chiba only); Motohiro Hata (Chiba only); Megan Thee Stallion; Milet; Novel Core (Chiba only); Omoinotake (Chiba only); One Ok Rock; The Oral Cigarettes (Chiba only); ØZI (Chiba only); **Post Malone**; Primal Scream (Chiba only); Queen Bee (Chiba only); Rina Sawayama; Salem Ilese; STUTS (Chiba only); Taiiku Okazaki (Chiba only); Tomorrow X Together; Wanima (Chiba only); Yungblud; Yuuri (Chiba only); Zico (Chiba only)

=== 2023 ===
August 19 Chiba / August 20 Osaka	August 20 Chiba / August 19 Osaka
Alexandros (Chiba only); A-Mei; BE:FIRST; **Blur**; Cosmos People (Chiba only); Enhypen; Fall Out Boy; Gabriels; Holly Humberstone; Honne; Jxdn; Ketsumeishi (Osaka only); Kroi; The Lounge Society (Chiba only); NewJeans (Chiba only); Niall Horan; Nulbarich (Chiba only); Pale Waves; SKY-HI; Sekai no Owari; Slowthai (Chiba only); Sunset Rollercoaster; Taiiku Okazaki (Osaka only); Thundercat; Two Door Cinema Club; Wanima (Osaka only); Wet Leg; Yoasobi; Zutomayo (Osaka only)	Ai; Awich; Babymetal; Cimafunk (Chiba only); Evanescence; Flo; Inhaler; **Kendrick Lamar**; The Kid Laroi; Kids Return (Chiba only); LANY; Lauv; Liam Gallagher; Macaroni Pencil; Maisie Peters; Milet (Osaka only); Momoiro Clover Z; My First Story (Chiba only); Night Tempo feat. Fancylabo; Nova Twins (Chiba only); The Snuts; Sumika (Chiba only); SOL; Treasure; Willow

=== 2024 ===
August 17 Chiba / August 18 Osaka	August 18 Chiba / August 17 Osaka
Adieu (Chiba only); AKMU (Chiba only); Ano (Osaka only); Apes (Chiba only); Avantgardey (Chiba only); Ayumu Imazu (Chiba only); Band-Maid (Chiba only); Belle and Sebastian; Benten Land (Osaka only); Bleachers; Bright; Chilli Beans.; Dai Hirai; Fiji Blue (Chiba only); Gen Hoshino (Chiba only); Glay (Chiba only); Humbreaders (Osaka only); imase; Lana (Chiba only); Laufey; Lauren Spencer-Smith; Lil Yachty; Little Glee Monster (Osaka only); M-Flo (Chiba only); Madison Beer; Major Lazer (Chiba only); **Måneskin**; Mina Okabe; NCT Dream; NIKO NIKO TAN TAN (Osaka only); Noa; Nothing but Thieves; Number_i; OneRepublic; Phoenix (Osaka only); Punpee (Chiba only); Riize; Rikon Densetsu (Osaka only); Ritsuki Akiyama (Chiba only); (sic)boy (Chiba only); Stephen Sanchez; Super Beaver; Swing Skit (Chiba only); Tempalay (Chiba only); The Bonez (Chiba only); The Toys (Chiba only); tonun (Osaka only); Underworld (Osaka only); Vaundy (Osaka only); Violette Wautier	Ai (Osaka only); AJR; All I Want (Osaka only); Aqua Timez (Osaka only); Atarashii Gakko!; Ateez; Aurora; Ayllton (Chiba only); BabyMonster (Chiba only); Banshimoku (Chiba only); Be First; Blue Encount (Chiba only); BMSG POSSE (Chiba only); Bodyslam (Chiba only); BoyNextDoor (Chiba only); **Bring Me the Horizon**; Chevon; Chanmina (Chiba only); Chim Chap (Chiba only); Christina Aguilera; Conton Candy (Osaka only); Creepy Nuts; CVLTE (Chiba only); Enfants; Greta Van Fleet; Hanabie. (Osaka only); Henry Moodie; Hitsujibungaku; Hoobastank; Hyde (Chiba only); INI; Ive (Osaka only); JO1; Leina (Chiba only); Lovejoy; Mikah (Chiba only); never young beach (Chiba only); Nia Archives (Chiba only); Nulbarich (Chiba only); Olivia Dean; Orange Range; Paledusk (Chiba only); Saba Sister; STUTS (Chiba only); Tele; Tyla; Wednesday Campanella; West; Yves Tumor; Zerobaseone

=== 2025 ===
August 16 Chiba / August 17 Osaka	August 17 Chiba / August 16 Osaka
7co (Osaka only); Ae! Group (Osaka only); Ai (Chiba only); Aina the End (Osaka only); Amazarashi (Chiba only); Ave Mujica (Chiba only); Babymetal; Band-Maid (Chiba only); Beabadoobee; Bloc Party; BUS (Chiba only); Cho Co Pa Co Cho Co Quin Quin (Osaka only); Common(Chiba only); Chase Atlantic (Chiba only); Chilldspot (Chiba only); Digable Planets (Chiba only); Docka (Chiba only); Domi and JD Beck; **Fall Out Boy**; Fear, and Loathing in Las Vegas (Osaka only); Gesaffelstein (Osaka only); Go!go!vanillas (Chiba only); Hana; Hot Milk; HIYADAM (Osaka only); Hyde; I-dle; Izna; Jimmy Jam and Terry Lewis (Chiba only); Juju (Chiba only); Kana (Osaka only); KickFlip; Kuroyume; Leina (Osaka only); LiSA; Lilbesh Ramko (Osaka only); Luvis (Osaka only); Man with a Mission (Osaka only); Monobloc; Monomi Twins (Osaka only); Mulasaki Ima; Official Hige Dandism; Psychic Fever; Porter Robinson; Pushim (Chiba only); Scha Dara Parr (Chiba only); SixTones (Chiba only); Takkyu Ishino (Osaka only); The Prodigy (Chiba only); The Rampage; The Rose; Tofubeats (Osaka only); Ulfuls; Wallice; Woodz; Yungblud	21 Savage (Chiba only); Aespa (Chiba only); Ai (Chiba only); Ai Tomioka (Chiba only); **Alicia Keys**; Akasaki; B&ZAI (Chiba only); Babymonster (Osaka only); Banshimoku (Chiba only); Be First; Bestted (Chiba only); Billyrrom; BMSG POSSE (Chiba only); Bomba Estéreo (Chiba only); Camila Cabello; Chanmina (Osaka only); Da-ice; DADA & AZU (Osaka only); Def Tech (Chiba only); DJ Shota (Osaka only); Dog Stock (Chiba only); Elijah Woods; Feid (Chiba only); Flumpool (Osaka only); Fruits Zipper; Furui Riho; FYURA (Chiba only); Infinity Song; INI; Iri; J Balvin; Jeff Satur; JO1 (Chiba only); Jorja Smith; Jvke; Kaneee (Chiba only); Katseye; Lana; Lee Young-ji; Mazzel; Mega Shinnosuke (Chiba only); MFS (Osaka only); Mrs. Green Apple (Chiba only); Muque (Chiba only); Muudo (Osaka only); Nessa Barrett; NiziU; Omoinotake; OMSB (Osaka only); Pastel Tang Club (Chiba only); Perro Negro (Chiba only); Reira Ushio (Osaka only); Rip Slyme (Chiba only); Shōnan no Kaze (Osaka only); Sincere (Osaka only); Sombr; Tainy (Chiba only); Tinashe; Treasure (Osaka only); Velly (Osaka only); Yuna Yabe (Osaka only); Yuuri; Ziproom (Chiba only)

=== 2026 ===
August 14 Chiba / August 15 Osaka	August 15 Chiba / August 16 Osaka	August 16 Chiba / August 14 Osaka
7co (Chiba only); Accusefive; Aina the End; Audrey Nuna; Babymonster (Chiba only); Bump of Chicken (Chiba only); Cardinals; Chloe Qisha; Daichi Yamamoto (Osaka only); Dean & Tabber (Osaka on August 16th, not August 15th); Dermot Kennedy; ena mori (Chiba only); First Love is Never Returned (Chiba only); Fear, and Loathing in Las Vegas (Chiba only); FKA Twigs; Florence Road; Fruits Zipper (Osaka only); Haku. (Chiba only); Holly Humberstone; Jade; Jennie (Osaka on August 16th, not August 15th); Jeremy Quartus (Chiba only); Kasabian; Keshi; Kodaline; kurayamisaka (Chiba only); Let me know (Osaka only); Macaroni Pencil; Man with a Mission (Chiba only); PassCode (Chiba only); PiXXiE (Chiba only); Queen Bee (Chiba only); REJAY x Andr (Chiba only); Rol3ert (Chiba only); Survive Said The Prophet (Osaka only); **The Strokes**; Umeda Cypher (Osaka only); West.; Wisp; Xdinary Heroes (Osaka on August 16th, not August 15th); Zebrahead	7 (Chiba only); **Ado**; Alex Warren; Be:First (Chiba only); Carín León (Osaka on August 14th, not August 16th); Clan Queen (Osaka only); Cornelius; David Byrne; Denki Groove; Destin Conrad; Dungeoneering (Chiba only); Elmiene; Father of Peace; Fullhouse; Generations (Chiba only); Good Neighbours; Hana; Hitsujibungaku; Humbe (Chiba only); Jon Spencer; Kaela Kimura (Osaka only); Kento Nakajima; kiki vivi lily (Osaka only); Kohjiya (Chiba only); Kvi Baba; Latin Mafia (Chiba only); Litty (Chiba only); luv (Chiba only); Mazzel; Midnight Till Morning (Chiba only); Mikado (Chiba only); MoMo (Osaka only); OddRe: Paloma Morphy (Chiba only); PC Music Club (Chiba only); Pretty Bleak; Sakanaction; Saucy Dog; SB19 (Osaka on August 14th, not August 16th); Sirup; Steve Lacy; Suede; The Guest List (band); Verses GT (Chiba only); Viagra Boys	amazarashi (Chiba only); Akmu; Ave Mujica; Babymetal; Band-Maid (Chiba only); Bini; Boy Soda; Chameleon Lime Whoopie Pie (Osaka only); Chilli Beans.; coffee (Chiba only); Crystal Waters (Chiba only); December 10; Endrecheri.; Flowerovlove; Halcali (Chiba only); Hana Hope (Osaka only); Jamiroquai; Kyary Pamyu Pamyu (Chiba only); **L'Arc-en-Ciel**; Le Sserafim; Legend of Honor (Chiba only); Maverick Mom (Chiba only); Metalverse; mgk (also playing Chiba August 15th as well); Nectar Woode; Night Tempo (Chiba only); Nishina (Chiba only); Nomelon Molemon (Chiba only); OisicleMelonpan (Chiba only); Oshikikeigo (Chiba only); Pendulum; Pentatonix; People 1 (Chiba only); PompadollS (Osaka only); Real McCoy (Chiba only); Sekou; South Arcade; Starglow; Suchmos (Chiba only); Tatsuya Kitani; The Warning; Thea Austin (Chiba only); Travis Japan; TWS; Wanima; XinU (Osaka only); Yuki

== See also ==
- List of historic rock festivals
- List of music festivals
