= Tavito Nanao discography =

- Studio albums: 6
- Singles: 8

The discography of Tavito Nanao consists of 6 studio albums and 8 singles, released under major label Sony, before switching to independent label Wonderground Music in 2002 and later Felicity in 2012.

== Studio albums ==
| Title | Album details | Peak chart positions (JPN) | Sales |
|---|---|---|---|
| Ame ni Utaeba...! Disc 2 (雨に撃たえば…！ ｄｉｓｃ２, "When the Rain Hits Me...! Disc 2") | Released: August 4, 1999; Label: Sony Music Associated Records (AICT-1102); Formats: CD | — | — |
| Heavenly Punk: Adagio (ヘヴンリィ・パンク：アダージョ, Hebunri Panku: Adājo) | Double album; Released: April 24, 2002; Label: Wonderground Music (WRCD-1/2); Formats: CD | — | — |
| Hikigatari Monogatari Vol. 1: Humming Bird (ひきがたり・ものがたり vol.1～蜂雀(ハミングバード), "Self-Accompanied Stories Vol 1: Humming Bird") | Released: March 21, 2003; Label: Wonderground Music (WRCD-11); Formats: CD | — | — |
| 911 Fantasia | 3CD musical about the September 11 attacks; Released: September 11, 2007; Label: Heartfast, Wonderground Music (HEARTFAST-003, WRCD-39~41); Formats: CD | 85 | 1,800 |
| Billion Voices | Released: July 7, 2010; Label: Felicity, P-Vine Records (cap-96, PCD-18615); Formats: CD | 41 | 7,600 |
| Little Melody (リトルメロディ, Ritoru Merodi) | Released: August 8, 2012; Label: Felicity, Space Shower Music (cap-153, PECF-1052); Formats: CD, vinyl, digital download | 17 | 11,000 |
| Stray Dogs | Released: December 12, 2018; Label: Felicity, Space Shower Music (cap-294, PECF-1164); Formats: CD, digital download | 43 | — |

== Singles ==
| Title | Year | Peak chart positions | | Sales | Album |
| Title | Year | Oricon Singles Charts | Billboard Japan Hot 100 | Sales | Album |
|---|---|---|---|---|---|
| "Omoide Over Drive" (オモヒデ オーヴァ ドライヴ, "Memory Over Drive") | 1998 | — | — | — | — |
| "'Ohayō, Bondage Cyborg'" (「おはよう．．．! ボンデェジ・サイボーグ」, "Good Morning, Bondage Cyborg") | 1998 | — | — | — | Ame ni Utaeba...! Disc 2 |
| "Tetsuyōbi no Yoru, Ranyōbi no Asa" (鉄曜日の夜→蘭曜日の朝, "Ironday Night, Orchidday Morning") | 1999 | — | — | — | Ame ni Utaeba...! Disc 2 |
| "Night of the Heading Head" (ナイト・オブ・ザ・ヘディング・ヘッド, Naito obu za Hedingu Heddo) | 2000 | — | — | — | Heavenly Punk: Adagio |
| "Yoru, Hikaru." (夜、光る。, "Night, Shining.") | 2000 | — | — | — | Heavenly Punk: Adagio |
| "Oyoso Kono Uchū ni Sonzai Suru Banbutsu ga "Uta" de Aru Koto no, Saisho no Shōmei" (およそこの宇宙に存在する万物全てが【うた】であることの、最初の証明, "The First Proof that Almost Every Living Thing in this Universe Has "Song"") | 2004 | 91 | — | 1,600 | — |
| "Rollin' Rollin'" (Tavito Nanao x Yakenohara) | 2009 | 46 | 87 | 2,500 | Billion Voices |
| "Circus Night" (サーカスナイト, Sākasu Naito) | 2012 | 141 | 42 | 500 | Little Melody |
| "Telepotion" | 2013 | 60 | 74 | 1,600 | TBA |

=== Featured singles ===
| Title | Year | Peak chart positions | | Sales | Album |
| Title | Year | Oricon Singles Charts | Billboard Japan Hot 100 | Sales | Album |
|---|---|---|---|---|---|
| "Lastscene" (ラストシーン, Rasuroshīn) (Takkyu Ishino featuring Tabito Nanao) | 2001 | 73 | — | 3,400 | Soul Scramble |

=== Promotional singles ===
| Title | Year | Peak chart positions | Album |
| Title | Year | Billboard Japan Hot 100 | Album |
|---|---|---|---|
| "Corner" (コーナー, Kōnā) | 1999 | — | Ame ni Utaeba...! Disc 2 |
| "Mimiuchi Sezu ni Irarenai Koto ga" (耳打ちせずにいられないことが, "Things I Don't Need to Whisper") | 2002 | — | Heavenly Punk: Adagio |
| "Kensaku Shōnen" (検索少年, "Search Boy") | 2010 | — | Billion Voices |
| "Dondon Kisetsu wa Nagarete" (どんどん季節は流れて, "The Seasons Are Rapidly Flowing By") | 2010 | — | Billion Voices |
| "Shōnan ga Tookunatteiku" (湘南が遠くなっていく, "Shōnan Is Getting Further Away") | 2012 | — | Little Melody |

== Collaborations and produced works ==
| Release | Artist | Title | Role | Album |
|---|---|---|---|---|
| 2001 | Atami | "Doppler" | Vocals | Doppler |
| 2001 | Hitomi | "Open Mind" | Background vocals | Huma-rhythm |
| 2001 | Makoto Kawamoto | "Blossom" | Lyrics, music | "Blossom" (single) |
| 2002 | Joseph Nothing | "Ballad for the Unloved" | Vocals, lyrics, music | Dummy Variations |
| 2002 | World's End Girlfriend | "All Imperfect Love Song" | Vocals, lyrics, music | Dream's End Come True |
| 2003 | Kūki Kodan | "Onkai Sayokyoku" (音階小夜曲, "Music Scale Serenade") | Vocals | Kodomo |
| 2003 | Kūki Kodan | "Tabi o Shimasen ka" (旅をしませんか, "Shall We Travel?") | Vocals | Kodomo |
| 2003 | Hyōe Yasuhara | "TekeTeke" | Vocals | Seishun no Outline |
| 2003 | Hyōe Yasuhara | "More" | Lyrics, music, vocals | Seishun no Outline |
| 2003 | Tatsuya Kokufu | "Ōgon Taiken" (黄金体験, "Gold Experience") | Vocals | Rock Tensei |
| 2004 | Takkyu Ishino | "Starlights in Sunshine" feat. Tavito Nanao | Vocals, writing, production | Title #2+#3 |
| 2005 | Denki Groove x Scha Dara Parr | "Saint Ojisan" (聖☆おじさん, "Saint Uncle") | Background vocals | Denki Groove toka Scha Dara Parr |
| 2005 | Denki Groove x Scha Dara Parr | "Eisū/Kana" (英数／かな, "ASCII, I Think") | Background vocals | Denki Groove toka Scha Dara Parr |
| 2006 | Miki Furukawa | "Sekai no Sasayaki" (世界のささやき, "Whispers of the World") | Lyrics, background vocals | Mirrors |
| 2006 | Disco Twins | "Awase Kagami no Senjitsu" (∞あわせKAGAMIの現実∞, "The Reality in Facing the Mirror") | Lyrics | Twins Disco |
| 2008 | Denki Groove | "Superstar" (スーパースター, Sūpāsutā) | Background vocals | J-Pop |
| 2008 | Eiko Ishibashi | "Fearless [Stop]" | Background vocals | Drifting Devil |
| 2008 | Eiko Ishibashi | "Drifting Devil" | Background vocals | Drifting Devil |
| 2008 | Tavito Nanao | "Last Date" | | Perfect!: Tokyo Independent Music |
| 2010 | Roy Tamaki | "Break Boy in the Dream" feat. Tavito Nanao | Lyrics, music, vocals | Break Boy |
| 2010 | Ua | "Watashi no Akachan" (私の赤ちゃん, "My Baby") | Cover; lyrics, music | Kaba |
| 2010 | Dorian | "Shooting Star" feat. Tavito Nanao & Yakenohara | Lyrics, music, vocals | Melodies Memories |
| 2011 | Salyu x Salyu | "Sailing Days" | Lyrics | S(o)un(d)beams |
| 2011 | Salyu x Salyu | "Rainboots de Odorimashō" (レインブーツで踊りましょう, "Let's Dance in Rainboots") | Lyrics | S(o)un(d)beams |
