= Guest List =

Guest List may refer to:

- "The Guest List", a song by Eels from the 1996 album Beautiful Freak
- "Guestlist", a song by Spoon from the 1998 album A Series of Sneaks
- The Guest List, a 2020 novel by Lucy Foley
- The Guest List (band), a British Indie-Rock Band.
