= Hiroji Miyamoto =

Japanese rock singer and vocalist of Elephant Kashimashi

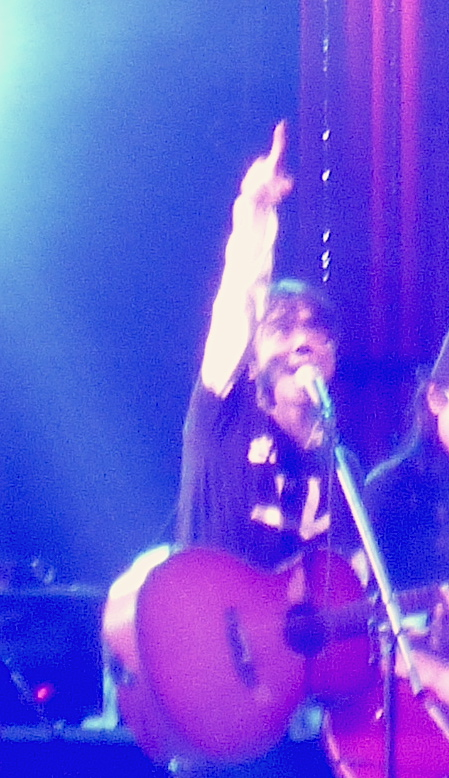
- On stage in 2016

Background information
- Also known as: Miyaji
- Born: June 12, 1966 (age 60); Tokyo, Japan
- Genres: Rock, alternative rock, blues rock, Pop-rock, Kayōkyoku, folk, choir
- Instruments: vocals, guitar, harmonica
- Years active: 1976–
- Label: Universal Music Japan (2019–)
- Website: miyamotohiroji.com

YouTube information
- Channel: 宮本浩次
- Years active: 2019–present
- Subscribers: 299 thousand
- Views: 140 million
- Last updated: 3 August, 2026

Hiroji Miyamoto (宮本浩次, Miyamoto Hiroji), born June 12, 1966, in Japan, is a Japanese rock singer-songwriter, lead vocalist of the rock-band Elephant Kashimashi, actor and former folk-choir singer. In 2018, he launched his solo career under talent agency Amuse and recording label Universal Music Japan. His alma mater is Tokyo International University.

== Biography ==
Since early age, Hiroji has been in touch with the music. Between third and fifth year of the elementary school, he was part of the NHK Tokyo Children's Choir. At age 10, he has released his first solo single "Hajimete no Boku Desu", credited as artist with Hiragana instead of Kanji. The song was broadcast on the NHK television station Minna no Uta. The single sold over 100k copies.

During middle school in 1981, he formed the band Elephant Kashimashi with his classmates and who made their major debut in 1989 under Epic/Sony RECORDS label. The band has been actively performing and making music as of 2023.

In 2000, he made his acting debut in the Japanese television drama Friends broadcast on TBS. On the 26th "The Television Drama Academy Awards", he received an award for the category of Best New Actor.

In 2018, he has officially launched his solo career by releasing digital duet single Kemono Yuku Hosomichi with Ringo Sheena. The single served as an theme song to the Nippon TV news program zero news. With this single on the same year, as soloist, he made first appearance in the NHK 69th new-year television program Kōhaku Uta Gassen. In 2020, he released his first full-length album Miyamoto, Dokupo . . In 2021, he released his first kayokyoku cover-album Romance. On the same year, he received Award-winning work from category Pop-entertainment given by Japanese Minister of Education, Culture, Sports, Science and Technology Award for Art Encouragement. In 2022, he released his first home-video DVD release Jūō Mujin Kanketsu-hen on birthday.

== Discography ==
He has released 4 albums, 5 physical singles, 4 digital singles 2 DVD/BD.

See also the Elephant Kashimashi discography.

=== Albums ===
Title	Album details	Peak chart positions
Title	Album details	JPN Oricon
Miyamoto, Dokupo.	Released: 4 March 2020; Label: Universal Music Japan; Formats: CD, CD+DVD, digital download, streaming	3
Romance	Released: 18 November 2020; Label: Universal Music Japan; Formats: CD, LP, digital download, streaming	1
Jūō Mujin	Released: 13 October 2021; Label: Universal Music Japan; Formats: CD, CD+DVD, CD+Blu-ray, digital download, streaming	2
Aki no Hi ni	Released: 23 November 2022; Label: Universal Music Japan; Formats: CD, digital download, streaming	3
I Am Hero	Released: 10 June 2026; Label: Universal Music Japan; Formats: CD, digital download, streaming	6

=== Singles ===
Title	Details	Peak chart positions
Title	Details	JPN Oricon
Hajimete no Boku desu	Released: 1976; Label: Polydor; Formats: LP	–
A・I・U・E・O・N・DO	Released: 1977; Label: Crown; Formats: LP	–
Noboru Taiyō	Released: 24 July 2019; Label: Universal Music Japan; Formats: CD, CD+DVD, digital download, streaming	15
Do You Remember?	Released: 23 October 2019; Label: Universal Music Japan; Formats: CD, CD+DVD, digital download, streaming	10
P.S. I Love You	Released: 16 September 2020; Label: Universal Music Japan; Formats: CD, CD+DVD, digital download, streaming	5
Sha・la・la・la	Released: 16 June 2021; Label: Universal Music Japan; Formats: CD, CD+photobook, digital download, streaming	5

=== Collaboration singles ===
Title	Single details	Reference
Kemono Yuku Hosomichi (Ringo Sheena & Hiroji Miyamoto)	Released: 2 October 2018; Label: Universal Music Japan; Formats: digital download, streaming	
Ashita Igai Subete Moyase (Tokyo Ska Paradise Orchestra & Hiroji Miyamoto)	Released: 28 November 2018; Label: Universal Music Japan; Formats: CD, digital download, streaming	

=== Digital singles ===
Year	Single	Reference
2019	"Fuyu no Hana"	
2019	"Tokihanate, Warera ga Shinjidai'"	
2019	"Noboru Taiyō"	
2019	"Do you remember?"	
2020	"Hallelujah"	
2020	"Yoake no Uta"	
2020	"P.S. I love you"	
2020	"Romance"	
2020	"Anata"	
2020	"Akai Sweet Pie"	
2020	"Keshō"	
2021	"Shining"	
2021	"Sha･la･la･la"	
2021	"Ukiyokouji no blues"	
2021	"Kono Michi no Saki de"	
2022	"Kazari ja Nai no yo Namida wa"	
2023	Woman "W no Higeki" yori	

=== DVD/BD ===
Title	Album details	Peak chart positions
Title	Album details	JPN Oricon
Jūō Mujin Kanketsu-hen on birthday	Released: 23 November 2022; Label: Universal Music Japan; Formats: DVD, BD	4
Romance no Yoru	Released: 29 November 2023; Label: Universal Music Japan; Formats: DVD, BD	6

== Filmography ==
Television drama
Year	Title	Role	Notes
2000	Friends	Honjō Naoya	Supporting role
2016	Ore no Sensei	Nishi Toratarō	Main role
