= Elephant Kashimashi =

Japanese rock band

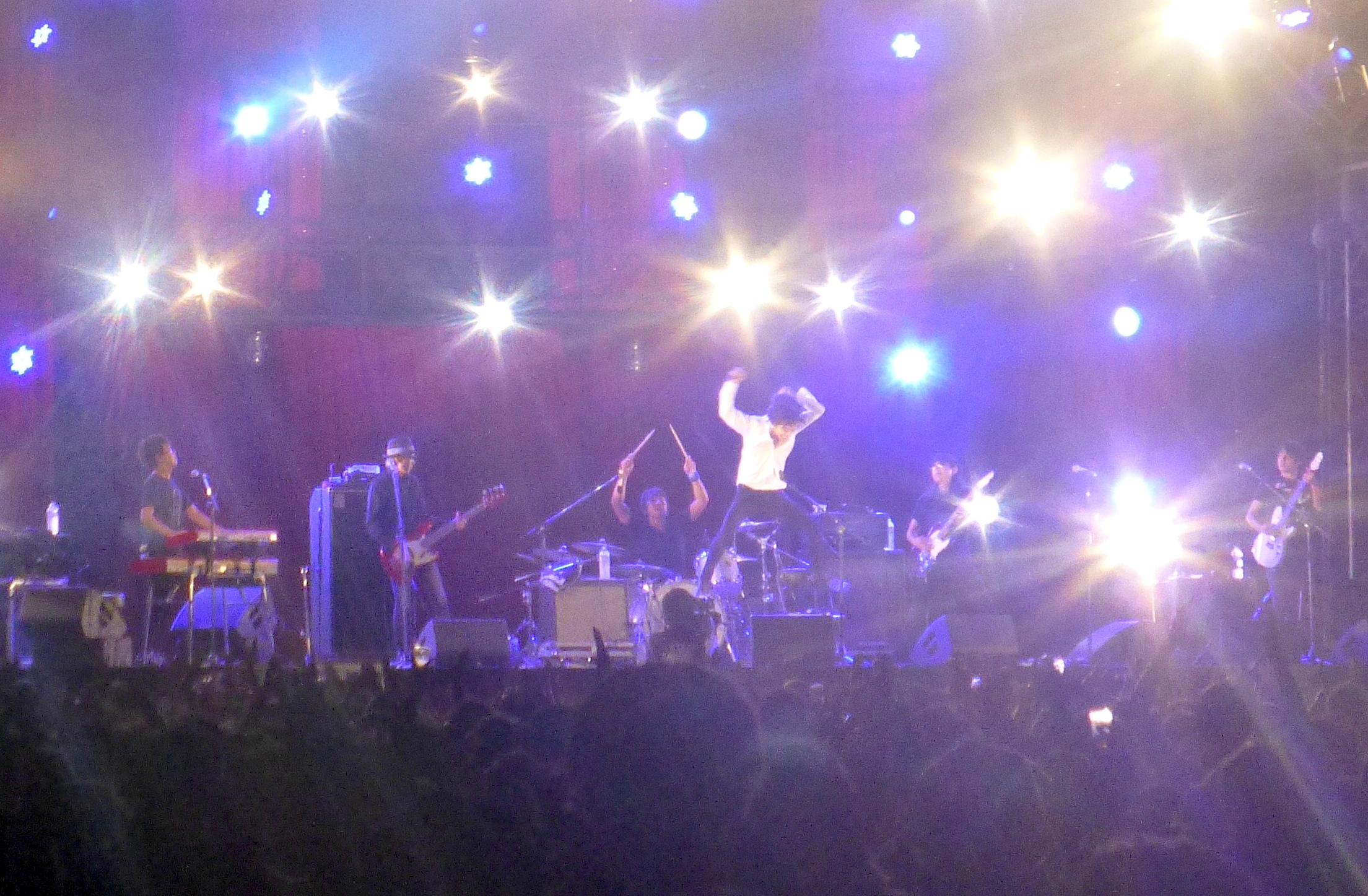
- Live on stage in 2016

Background information
- Also known as: Elekashi
- Origin: Kita, Tokyo, Japan
- Genres: Alternative rock, blues rock, grunge
- Years active: 1981–present
- Labels: Epic/Sony, Pony Canyon, Toshiba EMI/Capitol Music, Universal Music/A&M
- Members: Hiroji Miyamoto; Toshiyuki Ishimori; Seiji Takamidori; Yoshiyuki Tominaga
- Website: ElephantKashimashi.com

Elephant Kashimashi (Japanese: エレファントカシマシ, Hepburn: Erefanto Kashimashi), sometimes abbreviated as Elekashi (エレカシ, Erekashi), is a Japanese rock band from Kita, Tokyo, formed in 1981. It has consisted of vocalist and guitarist Hiroji Miyamoto, guitarist Toshiyuki Ishimori, bassist Seiji Takamidori and drummer Yoshiyuki Tominaga since 1986.

In 2007, Rolling Stone Japan ranked their album The Elephant Kashimashi II number 50 on a list of the greatest Japanese rock albums of all time.

== History ==
Elephant Kashimashi was formed in 1981 by Akabanedai Junior High School classmates Toshiyuki Ishimori and Yoshiyuki Tominaga on guitar and drums respectively. Vocalist and guitarist Hiroji Miyamoto joined in their third year of junior high, and they covered songs by bands such as Deep Purple, Rainbow and RC Succession. They participated in the amateur music competition EastWest put on by Nippon Gakki (Yamaha Corporation) playing original songs. In 1986, Tominaga's high school classmate Seiji Takamidori joined on bass completing the final line up that continues to this day. In December of that year they won the CBS Sony SD audition.

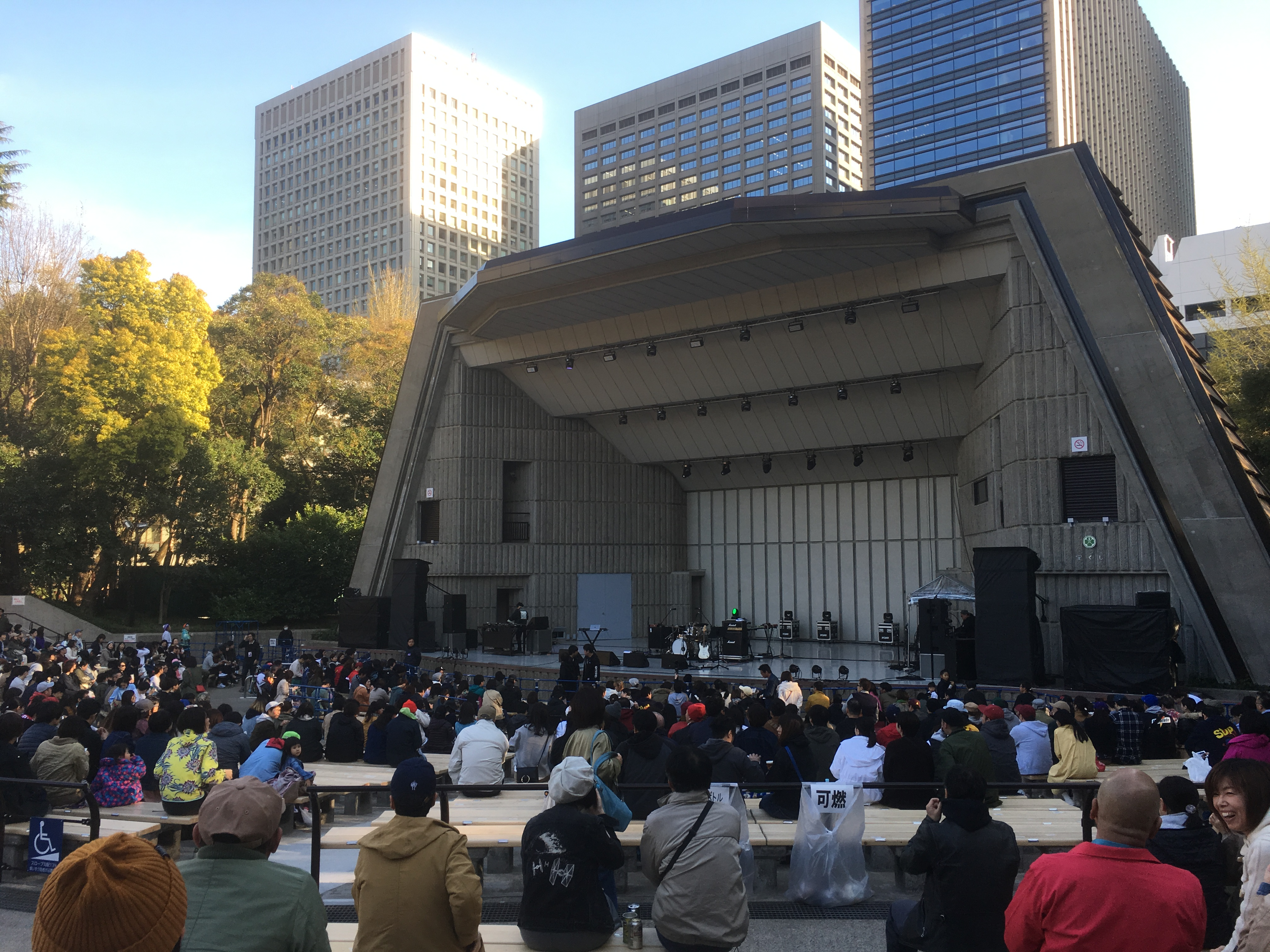
In a tradition that began in 1990, Elephant Kashimashi held a concert at Hibiya Open-Air Concert Hall every year until 2021.

Elephant Kashimashi made their debut on March 21, 1988, with the simultaneous Epic/Sony Records release of the single "Dede" and their self-titled album. Miyamoto, the band's principal songwriter, stated that his biggest influences at the time were Led Zeppelin, The Doors, The Rolling Stones, and T. Rex. Their second album, The Elephant Kashimashi II, followed in November of that same year. The band held a concert at Hibiya Open-Air Concert Hall in 1990 and it has become a tradition, with them having performed there every year since (except 2021). Following several albums with disappointing sales, their contract with Epic/Sony ended after their seventh album Tokyo no Sora in May 1994.

In 1996, Elephant Kashimashi signed with Pony Canyon and released the single "Kanashimi no Hate" in April and the album Kokoro ni Hana wo in August. The album sold well and gave them their first top 10 release on Oricon. Their 1997 album Asu ni Mukatte Hashire -Tsukiyo no Uta- was a big success with half a million copies sold, thanks to the single "Koyoi no Tsuki no Yoni" being used as the theme song of the TV drama Tsuki no Kagayaku Yoru Dakara.

After one more album with Pony Canyon, the band moved to Toshiba EMI in 1999. Reportedly, Elephant Kashimashi's sound at this time was influenced by American hard rock and industrial rock like Nine Inch Nails and Rage Against the Machine. In 2003, the tribute album Elephant Kashimashi Cover Album Hana Otoko was released featuring acts such as Straightener and Takkyu Ishino covering their songs.

In March 2006, Tominaga underwent surgery for a chronic subdural hematoma.

Elephant Kashimashi switched record labels to Universal Music in 2007, and released the single "Oretachi no Ashita" on November 21. The album Starting Over followed on January 30, 2008. "Kizuna", released as a single on March 18, 2009, became the band's first song to be used as the theme of a film when it was selected for Kanshiki Yonezawa Mamoru no Jikenbo. The album Noboreru Taiyō was released on April 29, and its tour ran from May 14 to June 3.

On September 1, 2012, Miyamoto had acute hearing loss in his left ear and underwent surgery. As a result live activities were suspended for a year until September 14, 2013, when they held a special concert. A second tribute album, Elephant Kashimashi Cover Album 2 ~A Tribute to The Elephant Kashimashi~, featuring bands such as Dragon Ash, The Back Horn, Brahman and 10-Feet was released in 2013.

At the 2018 Space Shower Music Awards, Elephant Kashimashi were given the Best Respect Artist award for their influence and achievements in music. To celebrate the 30th anniversary of their debut, Elephant Kashimashi held their first nationwide tour that covered every prefecture in Japan. It finished with a special concert at Saitama Super Arena where they were supported by Mr. Children and Spitz. Their album Wake Up was released on June 6, 2018, and went on to become a winner at the 11th CD Shop Awards. On November 16, 2018, Akabane Station began playing Elephant Kashimashi songs as departure melodies in hopes to revitalize the area. Three of the band's four members are from Akabane.

2021 marked the first year in 31 years that Elephant Kashimashi did not perform at Hibiya Open-Air Concert Hall. The band is celebrating its 35th anniversary in 2023. They released the single "Yes. I. Do" on March 8 and performed a nine-date arena tour in the spring. On June 9, they released Elephant Kashimashi Live Archive 2007–2017, a six CD and two Blu-ray set collecting live material previously only included on limited editions of their singles and albums.

== Members ==
- Hiroji Miyamoto (宮本 浩次, Miyamoto Hiroji; born June 12, 1966, in Akabane, Kita, Tokyo) – lead vocals, guitar, primary songwriter
- Toshiyuki Ishimori (石森 敏行, Ishimori Toshiyuki; born March 18, 1967, in Akabane, Kita, Tokyo) – guitar
- Seiji Takamidori (高緑 成治, Takamidori Seiji; born April 15, 1966, in Tsukishima, Chūō, Tokyo) – bass guitar
- Yoshiyuki Tominaga (冨永 義之, Tominaga Yoshiyuki; born April 14, 1966, in Akabane, Kita, Tokyo) – drums

== Discography ==
Elephant Kashimashi discography
- Studio albums: 22
- Extended plays: 1
- Live albums: 4
- Compilation albums: 8
- Singles: 51
- Video albums: 23
- Tribute albums: 3

=== Studio albums ===
Year	Album details	Oricon
1988	The Elephant Kashimashi: Released: March 21, 1988; Label: Epic/Sony Records	—
1988	The Elephant Kashimashi II: Released: November 21, 1988; Label: Epic/Sony Records	71
1989	Ukiyo no Yume (浮世の夢): Released: August 21, 1989; Label: Epic/Sony Records	56
1990	Seikatsu (生活): Released: September 1, 1990; Label: Epic/Sony Records	43
1992	Elephant Kashimashi 5 (エレファントカシマシ5): Released: April 8, 1992; Label: Epic/Sony Records	61
1993	Dorei Tengoku (奴隷天国): Released: May 21, 1993; Label: Epic/Sony Records	68
1994	Tokyo no Sora (東京の空): Released: May 21, 1994; Label: Epic/Sony Records	62
1996	Kokoro ni Hana wo (ココロに花を): Released: August 21, 1996; Label: Pony Canyon	10
1997	Asu ni Mukatte Hashire -Tsukiyo no Uta- (明日に向かって走れ-月夜の歌-): Released: September 10, 1997; Label: Pony Canyon	2
1998	Ai to Yume (愛と夢): Released: December 9, 1998; Label: Pony Canyon	11
2000	Good Morning: Released: April 26, 2000; Label: Toshiba EMI	13
2002	Life (ライフ, Raifu): Released: May 2, 2002; Label: Face Records	28
2003	Ore no Michi (俺の道): Released: July 16, 2003; Label: Face Records	34
2004	Tobira (扉): Released: March 31, 2004; Label: Face Records	34
2004	Kaze (風): Released: September 29, 2004; Label: Face Records	45
2006	Machi wo Miorosu Oka (町を見下ろす丘): Released: March 29, 2006; Label: EMI Music Japan	43
2008	Starting Over: Released: January 30, 2008; Label: Universal Music	7
2009	Noboreru Taiyō (昇れる太陽): Released: April 29, 2009; Label: Universal Music Sigma	3
2010	Akuma no Sasayaki ~Soshite, Kokoro ni Hi o Tomosu Tabi~ (悪魔のささやき〜そして、心に火を灯す旅〜): Released: November 17, 2010; Label: Universal Music Sigma	8
2012	Masterpiece: Released: May 30, 2012; Label: Universal Music Sigma	9
2015	Rainbow: Released: November 18, 2015; Label: Universal Music Sigma	12
2018	Wake Up: Released: June 6, 2018; Label: Universal Music	4

=== Mini-albums ===
Year	Album details	Oricon
2002	Dead or Alive: Released: December 26, 2002; Label: Barrier Free	86

=== Singles ===
Year	Title	Oricon
1988	"Dēde" (デーデ): Released: March 21, 1988	—
1988	"Fuwafuwa" (ふわふわ): Released: July 21, 1988	—
1988	"Ohayō Kon'nichiwa" (おはよう こんにちは): Released: November 2, 1988	—
1989	"Ukigumo Otoko" (浮雲男): Released: August 2, 1989	—
1990	"Otoko ha Yuku" (男は行く): Released: July 21, 1990	93
1992	"Shokō" (曙光): Released: March 25, 1992	—
1993	"Dorei Tengoku" (奴隷天国): Released: April 21, 1993	—
1993	"Gokuraku Taishō Seikatsu Sanka" (極楽大将生活賛歌): Released: October 1, 1993	—
1994	"Kono Yo ha Saikō!" (この世は最高!): Released: April 21, 1994	—
1996	"Kanashimi no Hate" (悲しみの果て): Released: April 19, 1996	60
1996	"Kodoku na Tabibito" (孤独な旅人): Released: July 19, 1996	49
1996	"Kanashimi no Hate" (悲しみの果て): Released: November 1, 1996	30
1997	"Ashita ni Mukatte Hashire" (明日に向かって走れ): Released: February 19, 1997	34
1997	"Tatakau Otoko" (戦う男): Released: March 14, 1997	35
1997	"Koyoi no Tsuki no Yō ni" (今宵の月のように): Released: July 30, 1997	8
1997	"Kaze ni Fukarete" (風に吹かれて): Released: November 7, 1997	50
1998	"Hajimari ha Ima" (はじまりは今): Released: May 13, 1998	29
1998	"Yume no Kakera" (夢のかけら): Released: September 18, 1998	20
1998	"Hito Koi Shikute, Ai wo Motomete" (ヒトコイシクテ、アイヲモトメテ): Released: November 18, 1998	34
1999	"Ai no Yume wo Kure" (愛の夢をくれ): Released: January 27, 1999	96
1999	"Mayonaka no Hero" (真夜中のヒーロー): Released: April 28, 1999	49
1999	"Gasutoronjā" (ガストロンジャー): Released: December 8, 1999	29
2000	"So Many People": Released: January 26, 2000	38
2000	"Call and Response" (コール アンド レスポンス, Kōru ando Resuponsu): Released: April 26, 2000	55
2001	"Kodokuna Taiyō" (孤独な太陽): Released: March 16, 2001	44
2001	"Shochū Mimai -Yūutsu na Gogo-" (暑中見舞 -憂鬱な午後-): Released: July 25, 2001	35
2002	"Futsū no Hibi" (普通の日々): Released: February 27, 2002	35
2002	"Anata no Yasashisa wo Ore ha Nani ni Tatoeyou" (あなたのやさしさをオレは何に例えよう): Released: April 17, 2002	39
2003	"Ore no Michi" (俺の道): Released: June 27, 2003	74
2003	"Hello Jinsei!!" (ハロー人生!!): Released: June 27, 2003	77
2003	"Seimei Sanka" (生命賛歌): Released: June 27, 2003	76
2004	"Bakemono Seinen" (化ケモノ青年): Released: March 10, 2004	71
2004	"Tomodachi ga Iru no Sa" (友達がいるのさ): Released: September 1, 2004	38
2007	"Oretachi no Ashita" (俺たちの明日): Released: November 21, 2007	17
2008	"Egao no Mirai he" (笑顔の未来へ): Released: January 1, 2008	47
2008	"Sakura no Hana, Maiagaru Michi wo" (桜の花、舞い上がる道を): Released: March 5, 2008	12
2008	"Atarashī Kisetsu he Kimi to" (新しい季節へキミと): Released: October 1, 2008	13
2009	"Kiduna" (絆(きづな)): Released: March 18, 2009	16
2010	"Shiawase yo, Kono Yubi ni Tomare" (幸せよ、この指にとまれ): Released: May 12, 2010	16
2010	"Asu he no Kioku" (明日への記憶): Released: September 22, 2010	17
2010	"Itsuka Mita Yume wo" (いつか見た夢を): Released: October 20, 2010	18
2011	"Winding Road" (ワインディングロード, Waindingu Rōdo): Released: November 16, 2011	14
2012	"Daichi no Symphony" (大地のシンフォニー): Released: April 25, 2012	11
2012	"Zureteru Hō ga Ī" (ズレてる方がいい): Released: October 31, 2012	18
2013	"Anata he" (あなたへ): Released: November 20, 2013	13
2014	"Destiny": Released: June 11, 2014	13
2015	"Aisubeki Kyō" (愛すべき今日): Released: September 23, 2015	9
2016	"Yume wo Ou Tabibito" (夢を追う旅人): Released: August 3, 2016	16
2017	"Kaze to Tomoni" (風と共に): Released: July 26, 2017	12
2017	"Restart/Ima wo Utae" (RESTART/今を歌え): Released: November 8, 2017	11
2023	"Yes. I. Do": Released: March 8, 2023	3

=== Limited singles ===
Year	Title
2006	"Signal/Ima wo Kakinarase" (シグナル／今をかきならせ): Released: March 20, 2006
2018	"Easy Go": Released: May 25, 2018

=== Compilation albums ===
Year	Album details	Oricon
1997	Elephant Kashimashi Best (エレファントカシマシ ベスト): Released: December 1, 1997; Label: Epic/Sony Records	27
2000	Sweet Memory ~Elekashi Seishun Selection~ (sweet memory〜エレカシ青春セレクション〜): Released: October 12, 2000; Label: Face Records/Toshiba EMI	6
2002	Elephant Kashimashi Singles 1988–2001 (エレファントカシマシ SINGLES1988-2001): Released: March 27, 2002; Label: Face Records/Toshiba EMI	47
2009	Elekashi Jisen Sakuhin-shū: Epic Sōseiki (エレカシ 自選作品集 EPIC 創世記): Released: September 16, 2009; Label: Sony Music Direct	61
2009	Elekashi Jisen Sakuhin-shū: Pony Canyon Sōseiki (エレカシ 自選作品集 PONY CANYON 浪漫記): Released: September 16, 2009; Label: Pony Canyon	59
2009	Elekashi Jisen Sakuhin-shū: EMI Sōseiki (エレカシ 自選作品集 EMI 胎動記): Released: September 16, 2009; Label: EMI Music Japan	63
2012	The Best 2007–2012 Oretachi no Ashita (THE BEST 2007-2012 俺たちの明日): Released: December 19, 2012; Label: A&M Records	10
2017	All Time Best Album The Fighting Man: Released: March 21, 2017; Label: Universal Sigma	3

=== Live albums ===
Year	Album details	Oricon
2005	Yaon Aki (野音 秋): Released: July 20, 2005; Label: Face Music Entertainment	—
2005	Nippon Natsu (日本 夏): Released: July 20, 2005; Label: Face Music Entertainment	—
2013	The Fighting Men's Chronicle -The Elephant Kashimashi Official Live Bootleg Box-: Released: April 23, 2013; Label: Face Music Entertainment	—
2013	The Elephant Kashimashi Live Best Bout (エレカシ 自選作品集 EPIC 創世記): Released: June 23, 2013; Label: Universal Music	—

=== Tribute albums ===
Year	Album details	Oricon
2003	Elephant Kashimashi Cover Album Hana Otoko (エレファントカシマシ カヴァーアルバム 花男): Released: March 19, 2003; Label: Face Records	79
2013	Elephant Kashimashi Cover Album 2 ~A Tribute to The Elephant Kashimashi~ (エレファントカシマシ カヴァーアルバム2 〜A Tribute to The Elephant Kashimashi〜): Released: December 18, 2013; Label: Universal Music	58
2018	Elephant Kashimashi Cover Album 3 ~A Tribute to The Elephant Kashimashi~ (エレファントカシマシ カヴァーアルバム3 〜A Tribute to The Elephant Kashimashi〜): Released: March 21, 2018; Label: Universal Music	29

=== Video albums ===
Year	Title	Oricon DVDs	Oricon Blu-rays
1998	Concert 1998 Nippon Budokan "Kaze ni Fukarete" (コンサート1998 日本武道館“風に吹かれて”): Released: April 1, 1998	72 (2009 re-release)	—
1998	Video Clip Collection "Clips" (ビデオクリップ集“クリップス”): Released: April 1, 1998	—	—
2001	Video Clip Collection "Clips 2" (ビデオクリップ集“クリップス2”): Released: March 16, 2001	—	—
2002	Life Tour 2002: Released: December 26, 2002	—	—
2004	Video Clip Collection "Clips 3" (ビデオクリップ集「クリップス3」): Released: March 10, 2004	96	—
2004	Tobira no Mukō (扉の向こう): Released: September 29, 2004	—	—
2009	Sakura no Hana Maiagaru Budōkan (桜の花舞い上がる武道館): Released: September 16, 2009	6	—
2010	Elephant Kashimashi 2009 October 24–25 Hibiya Yagai Ongakudō (エレファントカシマシ2009年10月24,25日 日比谷野外音楽堂): Released: March 17, 2010 (DVD), March 21, 2018 (Blu-ray)	14	209
2011	Elephant Kashimashi Epic Eizō Sakuhin-shū 1988–1994 (エレファントカシマシ EPIC映像作品集 1988-1994): Released: January 1, 2011	43	—
2011	Rock'n Roll Band Fes & Event Live History 1988–2011: Released: November 16, 2011	11	—
2013	The Fighting Men's Chronicle Elephant Kashimashi Director's Cut (the fighting men's chronicle エレファントカシマシ ディレクターズカット): Released: November 20, 2013	10	—
2013	Fukkatsu no Yaon 2013.9.15 Hibiya Yagai Dai Ongakudō (復活の野音 2013.9.15 日比谷野外大音楽堂): Released: December 18, 2013	17	—
2014	Elephant Kashimashi Debut 25th Anniversary Special Live Saitama Super Arena (エレファントカシマシ デビュー25周年記念 SPECIAL LIVE さいたまスーパーアリーナ): Released: March 19, 2014 (DVD), March 21, 2018 (Blu-ray)	10	186
2015	Elephant Kashimashi Shinshun Live 2015 Nihon Budōkan (エレファントカシマシ 新春ライブ2015 日本武道館): Released: September 23, 2015	15	15
2017	Elephant Kashimashi ~1988/09/10 Shibuya Kōkaidō~ (エレファントカシマシ～1988/09/10渋谷公会堂～): Released: July 26, 2017	44	29
2017	Debut 30th Anniversary Concert "Sarani Dōn to Iku ze!" Ōsaka-jō Hall (デビュー30周年記念コンサート”さらにドーンと行くぜ！” 大阪城ホール): Released: November 8, 2017	10	10
2018	Elephant Kashimashi 30th Anniversary Live Blu-ray Box: Released: March 21, 2018	—	—
2018	30th Anniversary Tour "The Fighting Man" Final Saitama Super Arena: Released: November 21, 2018	7	6
2019	Elephant Kashimashi Shinshun Live 2019 Nihon Budōkan (エレファントカシマシ 新春ライブ2019 日本武道館): Released: June 12, 2019	7	2
2019	Elephant Kashimashi Hibiya Yagai Dai Ongakudō 2019 July 6–7 (エレファントカシマシ 日比谷野外大音楽堂2019 7月6日,7日): Released: June 12, 2019	7	6
2021	Elephant Kashimashi Hibiya Yagai Dai Ongakudō 2020 (エレファントカシマシ 日比谷野外大音楽堂 2020): Released: March 17, 2021	3	5
2023	Elephant Kashimashi Live Archive 2007–2017 (エレファントカシマシ ライブアーカイブ2007-2017): Released: June 12, 2023	—	—
2023	35th Anniversary Tour 2023 Yes. I. Do: Released: September 20, 2023	4	5

== Awards ==
Year	Award	Category	Recipient or nominee	Result
2018	Space Shower Music Awards	Best Respect Artist	Elephant Kashimashi	Won
2019	Space Shower Music Awards	Best Group Artist	Elephant Kashimashi	Nominated
2019	CD Shop Awards	Winning Work	Wake Up	Won
