= Nishina =

Nishina (written: 仁科) is a Japanese surname. Notable people with the surname include:

- Akiko Nishina (born 1953), Japanese actress
- Nishina Morinobu (1557–1582), retainer of the Japanese samurai clan of Takeda during the closing years of the Sengoku period
- Yoshio Nishina (1890–1951), Japanese physicist

== See also ==
- Nishina (crater)
- Nishina Memorial Prize
- Nishina Shinmei Shrine
