= The Guest List (band) =

English indie rock band

- The Guest List in 2025

Background information
- Origin: Altrincham, Greater Manchester
- Genres: Indie rock; Alternative rock
- Years active: 2021–present
- Labels: Spinnaker Productions (independent); Artist Theory
- Members: Cai Alty; Tom Quigley; Leio Hunter; Angus Gilchrist; Sid Wallace
- Past members: Tom Coates
- Website: www.theguestlist.band

The Guest List are an English indie rock band from Manchester, formed in 2021. The band consists of Cai Alty (vocals, guitar), Tom Quigley (lead guitar), Leio Hunter (rhythm guitar), Sid Wallace (bass) and Angus Gilchrist (drums). They first gained attention online with covers of indie songs before releasing original material, and released their debut album, Something Real, in August 2026.

== History ==
=== 2021–2023: Formation and early releases ===
The band formed in 2021 from a group of school friends and music students who bonded over a shared love of The Strokes; they initially built an audience by posting indie covers online.

Their self-titled debut EP released in December 2022, and their single "Steel Police" followed on 21 September 2023.

=== 2024–2025: Radio support and When the Lights Are Out ===
In 2024 the band released "London" and "Loose Tongue", both produced by James Skelly of The Coral at Kempston Street Studios in Liverpool. The tracks were played on BBC Radio 6 Music by presenter Chris Hawkins. The song "161" was written about a street in Alty's hometown from which 161 men from 60 houses served in the First World War.

During 2025 the band supported Blossoms at Delamere Forest and played festivals including Kendal Calling, Truck Festival, Y Not Festival and Victorious Festival, as well as the BBC Introducing stage at TRNSMT. They headlined a UK tour in November 2025, including a date at New Century Hall in Manchester on 21 November.

Their EP When the Lights Are Out was released in November 2025. It included work recorded in Bergen with producer Matias Tellez. In the accompanying interview Alty said the band wanted to avoid being defined solely as "a Manchester band".

=== 2026–present: Something Real ===
The Independent included the band in its list of ten new acts to hear in 2026, describing them as on course to become one of the UK's next big guitar bands. The single "Something Real" was covered by NME, and in May 2026 The Line of Best Fit reported the announcement of their debut album, Something Real, with lead single "You Should Care". The album was released on 28 August 2026.

In 2026 the band played Reading and Leeds Festivals and Japan's Summer Sonic, and were announced as support for Courteeners on their 2026 UK Arena Tour on 6 November 2026.

== Musical style ==
Critics have compared the band's sound to the early work of Arctic Monkeys, with Rolling Stone UK likening parts of When the Lights Are Out to “Humbug-era Arctic Monkeys”. The band's lyrics address social themes, relationships, and societal issues - such as climate change.

== Members ==
=== Current Members ===
- Cai Alty – lead vocals, guitar
- Tom Quigley – lead guitar
- Leio Hunter – rhythm guitar
- Sid Wallace – bass
- Angus Gilchrist – drums

=== Former Members ===
- Tom Coates - bass

== Discography ==
=== Albums ===
List of albums, with selected chart positions
Title	Album details	Peak chart positions		
Title	Album details	UK	UK Indie	SCO
Something Real	Released: 10 September 2026; Label: Artist Theory	70	5	9
"—" denotes albums that did not chart, have not charted yet, or were not released.

=== Extended Plays ===
List of albums, with selected chart positions
Title	Album details	Peak chart positions		
Title	Album details	UK	UK Indie	SCO
The Guest List	Released: 16 December 2022; Label: Spinnaker Productions	—	—	—
When The Lights Are Out	Released: 7 November 2025; Label: Artist Theory	—	26	88
"—" denotes extended plays that did not chart, have not charted yet, or were not released.

=== Singles ===
List of singles, with selected chart positions, showing year released and album name
Title	Year	Peak chart positions			Album
Title	Year	UK Phys.	UK Indie	SCO	Album
"Won't You Leave Me Alone"	2022	—	—	—	The Guest List
"Canada"	2022	—	—	—	The Guest List
"Steel Police"	2023	—	—	—	Non-album single
"161"	2024	—	—	—	Non-album single
"London"	2024	—	—	—	Non-album single
"Loose Tongue"	2024	—	—	—	Non-album single
"Acoustic Sessions" (Note: Acoustic Sessions is a double A-side single featuring acoustic versions of 161 and London.)	2025	—	—	—	Non-album single
"Plasticine Heart"	2025	—	—	—	When The Lights Are Out
"Mary"	2025	—	—	—	When The Lights Are Out
"Weatherman"	2025	—	—	—	When The Lights Are Out
"Ruine"	2025	—	—	—	When The Lights Are Out
"The Air That I Breathe (Live Cover)"	2026	—	—	—	Non-album single
"Something Real"	2026	—	—	—	Something Real
"You Should Care"	2026	—	—	—	Something Real
"If Ever Your Devil Is Kind"	2026	—	—	—	Something Real
"Mundane"	2026	—	—	—	Something Real
"—" denotes singles that did not chart, have not charted yet, or were not released.
