= Keytalk =

Japanese rock band (2007-)

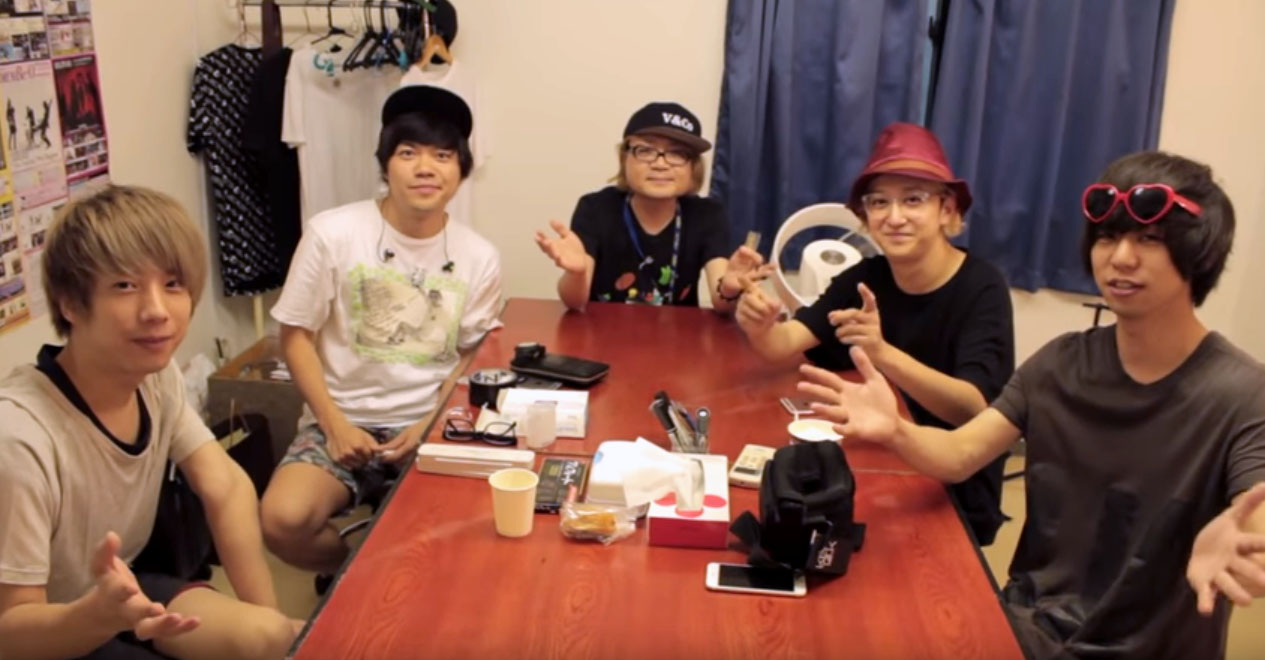
- Keytalk band group in 2016

Background information
- Origin: Japan
- Genre: Rock
- Years active: 2007–2024 (activity break)
- Members: Tomomasa Teranaka (vocals, rhythm guitar); Takemasa Ono (lead guitar); Yoshikatsu Shutou (vocals, bass); Yuuki Yagi (drum)
- Website: www.keytalkweb.com

Keytalk, styled KEYTALK, is a Japanese rock band. Their album HOT! reached the 4th place on the Weekly Oricon Albums Chart and their single "Starring Star" reached the 7th place on the Weekly Oricon Singles Chart. Their song "Ōka Ranman" is the first opening song of the anime television series Rin-ne and their song "Starring Star" is the second ending song of the anime television series Dragon Ball Super.

== Member ==
- Tomomasa Teranaka (Vocal, Rhythm Guitar)
- Takemasa Ono (Lead Guitar)
- Yoshikatsu Shutou (Vocal, Bass)
- Yuuki Yagi (Drums)

== Discography ==
=== Singles ===
Release date	Title	Oricon (Note: Peak ranking on the weekly Oricon Singles Chart.)	Ref.	Album
November 20, 2013	Coaster (コースター)	21		Overtone
March 12, 2014	Parallel (パラレル)	10		Overtone
October 22, 2014	Monster Dance	18		Hot!
March 4, 2015	Flavor Flavor	15		Hot!
April 29, 2015	Riot of Cherry Blossoms (桜花爛漫, Ōka Ranman)	23		Hot!
October 14, 2015	Starring Star (スターリングスター)	7		Paradise
April 13, 2016	Hello Wonderland	13		Paradise
May 18, 2016	Festival Music (MATSURI BAYASHI)	13		Paradise
November 23, 2016	Love Me	17		Paradise
January 25, 2017	Astro	10		Paradise
June 7, 2017	Twilight Symphony (黄昏シンフォニー, Tasogare Symphony)	13		Rainbow
August 30, 2017	Ephemeral Dream (セツナユメミシ, Setsuna Yumemishi)	12		Rainbow
January 24, 2018	Lotka Volterra (ロトカ・ヴォルテラ)	8		Rainbow
May 15, 2019	Bubble-Gum Magic	7		Don't Stop the Music

==== Digital singles ====
Release date	Title	Album
December 14, 2011	Last Christmas	—
February 29, 2012	Good Morning Twenty (おはようトゥエンティ, Ohayō Twenty)	—
April 24, 2013	In the Windy City of Cherry Blossoms (桜の風吹く街で, Sakura no Kaze Fuku Machi de)	—
September 1, 2014	End Credit Roll (エンドロール)	—
January 1, 2017	Rooters' Song (Oh!En!Ka!)	PARADISE
June 25, 2019	La La Rhapsody (ララ・ラプソディー)	Don't Stop the Music
August 9, 2019	Midsummer Impulse (真夏の衝動, Manatsu no Shoudou)	Don't Stop the Music
August 16, 2019	Labyrinth of Melody (旋律の迷宮, Senritsu no Meikyū)	Don't Stop the Music
August 23, 2019	Blue Hawaii (ブルーハワイ)	Don't Stop the Music
August 30, 2019	Catch the Wave	Don't Stop the Music
March 25, 2020	Sunrise (サンライズ)	Action!
August 26, 2020	Streamlined Nostalgic (流線ノスタルジック, Ryūsen Nostalgic)	Action!
November 25, 2020	Hello Blue Days	—
December 23, 2020	Orion	Action!
February 1, 2023	shall We Dance?	Dancejillion
February 22, 2023	Summer with You (君とサマー, Kimi to Summer)	Dancejillion
March 1, 2023	Sounds of the Future (未来の音, Mirai no Oto)	Dancejillion
March 15, 2023	Frenzied Paranormal (狂騒パラノーマル, Kyousou Paranormal)	Dancejillion

=== EPs ===
Release date	Title	Oricon	Ref.
March 17, 2010	KTEP	—	
May 9, 2012	KTEP2	48	
December 5, 2012	KTEP3	50	
November 17, 2013	KTEP FREE	—	
June 2, 2022	KTEP4	—	

=== Albums ===
Release date	Title	Oricon (Note: Peak ranking on the weekly Oricon Albums Chart.)	Ref.
July 7, 2010	Times Square	158	
November 9, 2011	Sugar Title	135	
March 6, 2013	One Shot Wonder	52	
May 21, 2014	Overtone	13	
May 20, 2015	Hot!	4	
March 15, 2017	Paradise	2	
March 7, 2018	Rainbow	5	
November 6, 2019	Don't Stop the Music	5	
August 25, 2021	Action!	9	
August 30, 2023	Dancejillion	19	

==== Live albums ====
Release date	Title	Oricon	Ref.
March 2, 2016	KEYTALKの武道館で舞踏会 ～shall we dance?～	36	
December 20, 2017	横浜アリーナ ワンマンライブ 俺ら出会って10年目 ～shall we dance?～	111	

==== Compilation albums ====
Release date	Title	Oricon	Ref.
July 6, 2016	KTEP COMPLETE	12	
March 18, 2020	Best Selection Album of Victor Years	76	
March 18, 2020	Coupling Selection Album of Victor Years	79	
March 18, 2020	Best Selection Album of Victor Years Complete Box	29	

=== DVDs / BDs ===
Release date	Title	Oricon (Note: Peak ranking on the weekly Oricon DVD Chart.)	Ref.
December 17, 2014	OVERTONE TOUR 2014 at AKASAKA BLITZ	19	
September 30, 2015	MUSIC VIDEO COLLECTION 2010-2015	16 / 48	
March 2, 2016	KEYTALKの武道館で舞踏会 ～shall we dance?～	4 / 9	
December 20, 2017	横浜アリーナ ワンマンライブ 俺ら出会って10年目 ～shall we dance?～	11 / 33	
December 19, 2018	幕張メッセ ワンマンライブ ド真ん中で頑張マッセ 〜shall we dance?〜	20 / 44	
