= SVGV =

Asian electric music group

- Also known as: SAGA, SAGA组合
- Origin: Seoul, South Korea
- Genres: EDM; future bass; pop; trap
- Instruments: Piano; Keyboards; synthesizer
- Years active: 2014–present
- Label: Touhou/Mikarin Records
- Members: RAMY (Lead Vocalist); TRIRION (DJ, Record Producer); PEACH(Lead Vocalist)
- Past members: KEVIN(Lead Vocalist)
- Website: svgv.asia

SVGV (pronounced "saga") is an Asian Electronic dance music group based in Los Angeles, formed in 2014. Originally the group name was spelled as "SAGA". In china it is also stylized as SAGA组合.

== Background ==
TRIRION, the producer / DJ of the group is originally working as a Music producer for number of famous anime titles such as Initial D, Viewtiful Joe (TV series). In 2013, as he inspired the idea of "No Border", connect country to country by music, he decided to hold the auditions through Beijing, China to Seoul Korea and discovered RAMY and KEVIN. While the relationship between their own three countries were facing tensed situation at that time, he decided to form the group SVGV.

== History ==
=== 2014 : Formation, "No Border World Tour" ===
In March 2014, the group debuted with the very peculiar concept of “No borders” in 2014.

In April 2014, TRIRION remixed "Pura Pura Cinta (SVGV Remix)" the song of Indonesian Indonesian Idol group Cherrybelle and performed at Indonesian National Television SCTV (Indonesia). in the show, TRIRION announced the formation of the group "SVGV(SAGA)" first time in public.

In April 2014, the group ranked as number one artist first appearance on the Japanese largest music site “BARKS” In May, the group had their first public appearance with headlining Indonesian festival "Ennichisai" at Jakarta which marked more than 200,000 attendance with JKT48 and many other artists. Also the group produced the anthem for the festival. *

In October 2014, the group headlined at main stage of Lucca Comics & Games which marked over 190,000 attendance in total.

In December 2014, the group debut in China with the performance in CHIC! style Award (小资风尚盛典) at Mercedes-Benz Arena (Shanghai) with numbers of Asian artists such as Rain (entertainer), Lin Chi-ling. This was broadcast by Chinese national televising Phoenix Television, and national internet media such as Le.com and PPTV.

In December 2014, the group announced their collaboration with Indonesian rock band J-Rocks. In April 2015, they performed their collaboration "Together - Indonesian ver." in Indonesian national broadcasting NET.

=== 2015 : "Awakening World Tour" ===
In January 2015, 新华网 featured them as succeeded their first Europe Tour through 11 cities around Europe and came back to China.

In March, they remixed "Misery" by Japanese rock band Kuroyume and it was released in Japan.

In September 2015, the group announced their 3rd world tour named "Awakening" including the country such as France, Belgium, Austria, Slovenia, Portugal, Germany, and The Netherlands.

In September 2015, the group released the trailer of their upcoming documentary named SAGA TV - Journey to no border -.

=== 2016 : New formation, 1st full album "LIFE", "Journey of Life World Tour" ===
In January 2016, the group produced 4 songs include theme song for Chinese movie "黒白無双", the remake of Chinese online cartoon which marked 300 million viewers in total. The songs were mastered by 6 times winner of Grammy Award, Tom Coyne (music engineer), who worked with Adele, Sam Smith and many other artists. The guitar track was recorded by Isao Fujita, the guitarist of a Japanese metal idol band Babymetal.

In March 2016, when the group received the notification from Canadian rock band Saga (band) which has the same name and spelling, they agreed to change their group spelling as "SVGV" (still pronounced same "SAGA"). They released their 3rd single Mountain with new spelling of the group.

In May 2016, SVGV released their debut full album. The Album features influences from a variety of genres, including EDM, Pop music, House music, trap music, Hip hop and Asian ethnic music.

In October 2016, RAMY published the music video for her cover song "前前前世", the song of Japanese rock band Radwimps. the song is the theme song for Japanese movie "Your Name / 君の名は".

=== 2017 : "Who am I", "Further Than Ever World Tour" ===
In April 2017, the group succeeded their first performance in South America as headlining J'fest in Mexico city.

In May 2017, they group released their 5th single "Who am I" with their self-directed and produced music video shoot in Downtown Los Angeles.

The Group announced their 4th European Tour in summer of 2017.

== Musical style and lyrics ==
The group defines its style as a new genre called "Asian EDM" and clarifies that it is "a mix of Modern Electronic dance music with Asian Pop music such as K-pop or J-pop". Lyrical themes found in SVGV's music focus on unity of people, encouraging people around the world to accept the difference and stand up for themselves and unite the world.

In China, the producer of SVGV, TRIRON is compared to two music producer Nicholas Tse and Huang Xiaoming by several national medias such as NetEase and Sohu.

== Live performances ==
Until April 2017, they have completed four world tours for a total of 150 shows in more than 70 cities around the world so far.

== Members ==
=== Main members ===
- RAMY (born in South Korea) - Lead Vocals, Writer (2014 – present)
- TRIRION (born in Japan) - DJ, Producer, Writer, Film Producer (2014 – present)

=== Secondary members ===
- PEACH (born in China) - Lead Vocals (2016 – present)

=== Former members ===
- KEVIN (born in China) - Lead Vocals (2014 - 2015)

== Discography ==
=== Albums ===
- 2016 : "Life"

=== Singles ===
- 2016 : "Mountain"
- 2016 : "Horizon"
- 2016 : "Ecstasy"
- 2017 : "My Everything"
- 2017 : "Who am I"

=== Remixes ===
- 2016 : "Misery" (Kuroyume)

== Tours ==
- 2014 : "No border world tour"
- 2015 : "Unite the world tour"
- 2015 : "Awakening world tour"
- 2016 : "Journey of life world tour"
- 2017 : "Further than ever world tour"
