= Kyuso Nekokami =

Japanese punk rock band

Kyuso Nekokami キュウソネコカミ
- Origin: Nishinomiya, Hyōgo Prefecture, Japan
- Genres: Punk rock, comedy, post-hardcore
- Years active: 2009-present
- Labels: Exxentric Records, Getting Better
- Members: Seiya Yamasaki, Shinnosuke Yokota, Kazuma Okazawa, Takurō Kawakubo, Taisuke Sogō
- Past members: Hagane-maru
- Website: kyusonekokami.com

Kyuso Nekokami (キュウソネコカミ, Kyūso Nekokami; "Cornered Rat's Bite of a Cat") is a Japanese punk rock band that formed in 2009.

== Biography ==
The band formed in December 2009, and was made up of students from Kwansei Gakuin University's music club in Nishinomiya. After finding it difficult to find full-time employment, the members decided to form the band. For three of the members, this was the fourth time they had formed a band. Seiya Yamasaki and Kazuma Okazawa were originally from a band called Self Borraginol (セルフボラギノール, Serufu Boraginōru), which formed at Kwansei Gakuin University and was active in 2008 and 2009. Keyboardist Shinnosuke Yokota was originally from a band called Blank Map, and drummer Taisuke Sogō from a band called Bakajikara (バカ力). The band took their name from an accessory from the game Final Fantasy X-2, Kyūso Nekokami (キューソネコカミ), which was translated as "cat nip" in the English version of the game. The name is a reference to the Japanese proverb Kyūso neko o kamu (窮鼠 猫を噛む; "A cornered rat will bite a cat").

In 2010, the band started performing at live houses across the Kansai area. In March 2012, the band released their first album Jūdai de Dashitakatta, followed by Daiji na Oshirase in December. The band entered the Rockin' On Japan web competition Ro69Jack 2011, and were one of 14 prize winning bands.

The band's 2013 extended play We Are Indies Band!! was successful, debuting in the top 20 of Oricon's albums charts. On April 1, 2014, it was announced that Kyuso Nekokami signed with major label Victor Entertainment, where they released Change the World in June.

The band has also toured in Asia.

== Members ==
- Seiya Yamasaki (ヤマサキ セイヤ, Yamasaki Seiya) is the band's main vocalist and guitarist. His name in kanji is 山崎正也, and he is originally from Gobō, Wakayama.
- Shinnosuke Yokota (ヨコタ シンノスケ, Yokota Shinnosuke) is the band's keyboardist and occasional vocalist.
- Kazuma Okazawa (オカザワ カズマ, Okazawa Kazuma) is the band's guitarist. His name in kanji is 岡澤和真, and he is originally from Nishiki-chō in Sasayama, Hyōgo.
- Takurō Kawakubo (カワクボ タクロウ, Kawakubo Takurō) is the band's bassist, who joined the band on November 25, 2011 after Hagane-maru left.
- Taisuke Sogō (ソゴウ タイスケ, Sogō Taisuke) is the band's drummer.

=== Former member ===
- Hagane-maru (はがね丸) is the band's former bassist, who left on November 25, 2011 to be replaced by Takurō Kawakubo.

== Discography ==
=== Studio albums ===
List of albums, with selected chart positions
Title	Album details	Peak positions	Sales (JPN) (Note: Sales provided by Oricon database and are rounded to the nearest hundred copies.)
Title	Album details	JPN	Sales (JPN)
Jūdai de Dashitakatta (10代で出したかった; "We Wanted to Put Out Something in Our Teens")	Released: March 7, 2012 (JPN); Label: Exxentric Records; Formats: CD, digital download	194 (Note: Charted in 2014.)	900
Daiji na Oshirase (大事なお知らせ; "Important Message")	Released: December 19, 2012 (JPN); Label: Exxentric; Formats: CD, digital download	201	1,000
Jinsei wa Madamada Tsuzuku (人生はまだまだ続く; "Life Keeps Going On and On")	Released: October 21, 2015 (JPN); Label: Getting Better; Formats: CD, CD/DVD, digital download	4	20,000

=== Extended plays ===
List of albums, with selected chart positions
Title	Album details	Peak positions	Sales (JPN)
Title	Album details	JPN	Sales (JPN)
We Are Indies Band!! (ウィーアーインディーズバンド!!, Uī Ā Indīzu Bando)	Released: October 16, 2013 (JPN); Label: Exxentric; Formats: CD, digital download	19	16,000
Change the World (チェンジ ザ ワールド, Chenji za Wārudo)	Released: June 18, 2014 (JPN); Label: Getting Better; Formats: CD, digital download	15	18,000
Happy Ponkotsu Land (ハッピーポンコツランド)	Released: January 14, 2015 (JPN); Label: Getting Better; Formats: CD, digital download	7	18,000
Harinezumizumu (ハリネズミズム)	Released: January 29, 2020 (JPN); Label: Victor Entertainment; Formats: CD, digital download	6	8,000
Mouse Spirits (マウスピリッツ)	Released: December 3, 2025 (JPN); Label: Victor Entertainment; Formats: CD, digital download	37	1,170

=== Singles ===
List of singles, with selected chart positions
Title	Year	Peak chart positions		Sales (JPN)	Album
Title	Year	JPN Oricon	JPN Hot 100 (Note: Sources for chart positions are as follows: "Bibitta", "Galaxy", "Mega Shake It", "Naku na Oyaji".)	Sales (JPN)	Album
"Mega Shake It!"	2015	13	11	15,000	Jinsei wa Madamada Tsuzuku
"Happy Ponkotsu" (ハッピーポンコツ)	2015	13	—	15,000	Jinsei wa Madamada Tsuzuku

=== Promotional singles ===
Title	Year	Peak chart positions	Album
Title	Year	JPN Hot 100	Album
"Bibitta" (ビビった; "Froze")	2014	88	Change the World
"Galaxy"	2015	19	Happy Ponkotsu Land
"Naku na Oyaji" (泣くな親父; "Don't Cry, Old Man")	2015	88	Jinsei wa Madamada Tsuzuku

=== Video albums ===
List of media, with selected chart positions
Title	Album details	Peak positions
Title	Album details	JPN DVD
DMCC: Real Oneman Tour	Released: July 19, 2013 (JPN); Label: Exxentric Records; Formats: DVD	—
DMCC-Real Oneman Tour: Doko Made mo Chokochoko Live in Studio Coast (ドコまでもチョコチョコ)	Released: March 25, 2015 (JPN); Label: Getting Better; Formats: DVD	16
