= Tavito Nanao =

Japanese singer-songwriter (born 1979)

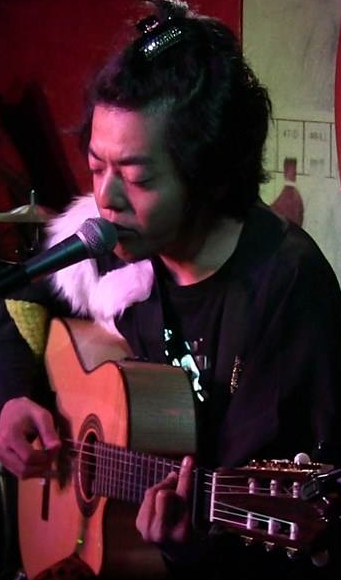
- Video still of Tavito Nanao performing at Pianos in NYC October 29, 2013

Background information
- Birth name: Tabito Nanao
- Also known as: 770, Singing DJ Toshiko (SINGING dj 寿子)
- Born: August 20, 1979 (age 45)
- Genres: Alternative rock, electronic, experimental, punk
- Occupation(s): Singer-songwriter, disc jockey
- Instrument(s): Acoustic guitar, electric guitar
- Years active: 1998–present
- Labels: Sony (1998–2001); Wonderground Music (2002–2007); Heartfast (2007); BII – Felicity (2009–present)
- Website: tavito.net

Tavito Nanao (七尾旅人, Nanao Tabito, born August 20, 1979) is a Japanese singer-songwriter who debuted in 1998. He has worked with a great number of musicians, including Takkyu Ishino, Salyu and Yakenohara. Nanao has reached a wider audience since 2007, after his album 911 Fantasia, a 3CD musical about the September 11 attacks, his collaboration single with Yakenohara, "Rollin' Rollin'," and the success of his 5th album, Billion Voices.

== Biography ==
Nanao was born prematurely on August 20, 1979, and grew up in a rural area of Japan. Until 13, most of the music Nanao had listened to was jazz, due to the influence of his father. From the beginning of middle school, however, Nanao began to listen to musicians such as a rock band B'z.

In the summer of 1994, he discovered grunge music and would often be absent from school. On New Year's Eve of 1994, Nanao decided to write music, by humming tunes and writing down lyrics, and throughout the next year began writing songs daily. After copying the styles of several bands he enjoyed, Nanao found songwriting a spontaneous activity. In 1996, after a year of high school, Nanao decided to drop out of high school, and in September took a friend's acoustic guitar and multitrack recorder and moved to Tokyo. In a year's time in 1997, Nanao sent in a demo tape for the Sony Soytzer Music Audition, which led to Nanao being signed to Sony.

Nanao's initial recordings were in Los Angeles in March and July 1998, where he bought acoustic and electric guitars. In September, Nanao debuted with the single "Omoide Over Drive." After several other singles, Nanao recorded his debut album throughout early to mid-1999, and released it in August, titled Ame ni Utaeba...! Disc 2. In March 2000, Nanao performed his first live at the Shinjuku Liquid Room.

Yoru, Hikaru.
A sample from the chorus of the single "Yoru, Hikaru." (2000)

"Rollin' Rollin'"
A sample from Nanao's collaboration with Yakenohara (2009), one of his most commercially successful works.

Nanao slowly worked on his second studio album, Heavenly Punk: Adagio, throughout 2000 and 2001, releasing two singles in 2000. Most of the work was completed between December 2001 and March 2002, with the final product released in April. The album was the first album to be released through Wonderground Music, an independent record label. In May and June 2002, Nanao performed his first tour alongside Hiroya Komeiji, performing at four cities across Japan. Nanao continued to work with Wonderground, releasing a self-accompanied album in 2003 and a single+DVD set in 2004. The single was the first of Nanao's works through both Sony and Wonderground to chart on Oricon's albums and single charts.

In 2007, Nanao released a three CD musical album called 911 Fantasia, themed around the events of the September 11 attacks. Nanao considers this the peak work of his teens and 20s. The release of this album lead to Nanao's introduction to rapper Yakenohara, and the pair collaborated with the single "Rollin' Rollin" in 2009. This, along with Nanao, 2010 album, were both releases that charted in the top 50.

== Discography ==
- Ame ni Utaeba...! Disc 2 (1999)
- Heavenly Punk: Adagio (2002)
- Hikigatari Monogatari Vol. 1: Humming Bird (2003)
- 911 Fantasia (2007)
- Billion Voices (2010)
- Little Melody (2012)

== Filmography ==
- Kyrie (2023)
