= Takkyu Ishino =

Takkyu Ishino 石野 卓球
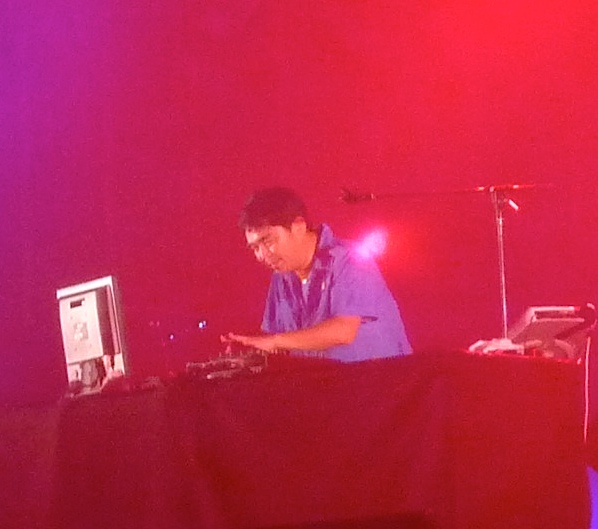
- Takkyu Ishino performing live in Japan, 2011

Background information
- Also known as: Ninjahead
- Born: Fumitoshi Ishino; 26 December 1967 (age 58); Shizuoka, Shizuoka Prefecture, Japan
- Genres: Techno
- Occupations: Musician; DJ; record producer; singer
- Years active: 1983–present
- Label: Ki/oon Music
- Website: www.takkyuishino.com

Fumitoshi Ishino (石野 文敏, Ishino Fumitoshi; born 26 December 1967), better known by his stage name Takkyu Ishino (石野 卓球, Ishino Takkyū), is a Japanese musician, DJ, record producer, and singer from Shizuoka, Shizuoka Prefecture. He is a member of Denki Groove.

== Discography ==
=== Studio albums ===
- Dove Loves Dub (1995)
- Berlin Trax (1998)
- Throbbing Disco Cat (1999)
- Karaokejack (2001)
- The Album (2003) (with Yasuyuki Okamura)
- Title #1 (2004)
- Title #2 + #3 (2004)
- C-46 (2006) (with Hiroshi Kawanabe, as Ink)
- Ink Punk Phunk (2007) (with Hiroshi Kawanabe, as Ink)
- Cruise (2010)
- Lunatique (2016)
- Acid Tekno Disko Beatz (2017)

=== Compilation albums ===
- Titles (2005)
- Euqitanul (2016)
- Wire Trax 1999–2012 (2012)
- Takkyu Ishino Works 1983–2017 (2018)

=== DJ mix albums ===
- Mix Up Vol. 1 (1995)
- DJF400 (1998)
- In the Box: Live at Womb Tokyo (2003)
- A Pack to the Future (2005)

=== Soundtrack albums ===
- Papa Semplicità (2003)
- Tokyo Swindlers (2024)

=== EPs ===
- Dove Loves Dub 4 Tracks (1995)
- Galactik Pizza Delivery Vol. 1 (1998)
- New Wave EP: Galactik Pizza Delivery Vol. 2 (1998) (with WestBam)
- Montag EP (1998)
- Loopa 000 (1998)
- Matadors of Techno EP (1999) (with Beroshima)
- Technomusik Ab und Zu: Galactik Pizza Delivery Vol. 3 (2001) (with WestBam)
- Lunar EP Part 1 (2016)
- Lunar EP Part 2 (2016)
- Recycled Tracks Pt. 7 (2018) (as Ninjahead)

=== Singles ===
- "Chime" (1995) (with Tomoe Shinohara)
- "Anna: Letmein Letmeout" (1999)
- "Feeling" (2000)
- "Suck Me Disco" (2001)
- "Stereo Nights" (2001)
- "Last Scene" (2001) (featuring Tavito Nanao)
- "Come Baby" (2002) (with Yasuyuki Okamura)
- "Love Train" (2002) (with Frank Müller)
- "The Rising Suns" (2004)
- "Konya Dake" (2018) (with Tavito Nanao)
- "Mogura Tataki no Yō na Hito 2018" (2018) (with Akari Machi)
- "Turkish Smile" (2019)
- "Koyote Tango" (2019)
- "John Rydoon" (2019)
- "Chat on the Beach" (2019)
- "Bass Zombie" (2019)
