= Aco discography =

Discography of J-pop singer Aco

- Studio albums: 10
- Extended plays: 3
- Live albums: 1
- Compilation albums: 1
- Singles: 22
- Video albums: 5
- Remix albums: 1

This is the discography of J-pop singer Aco.

== Studio albums ==
Title	Details	Peak chart positions
Title	Details	JPN Oricon
Kittenish Love	Released: April 21, 1996; Label: Ki/oon Records; Formats: CD	85
Nude	Released: April 21, 1997; Label: Ki/oon; Formats: CD	64
Lady Soul	Released: September 19, 1998; Label: Ki/oon; Formats: CD	33
Absolute Ego	Released: December 15, 1999; Label: Ki/oon; Formats: CD, LP	8
Material	Released: May 23, 2001; Label: Ki/oon; Formats: CD, LP	19
Irony	Released: June 18, 2003; Label: Ki/oon; Formats: CD	42
Devil's Hands	Released: October 6, 2010; Label: AWDR/LR2; Formats: CD, digital download	133
Luck	Released: January 18, 2012; Label: AWDR/LR2; Formats: CD, digital download	94
Trad	Released: November 6, 2013; Label: AWDR/LR2; Formats: CD, digital download	146
Valentine	Released: December 16, 2015; Label: AWDR/LR2; Formats: CD, LP, digital download	150

== Compilations albums ==
Title	Details
Aco Best: Girl's Diary	Released: December 19, 2007; Label: GT Music; Formats: 2CD, digital download
Muliebrity: Aco 30th Anniversary All Time Best	Released: May 27, 2026; Label: Sony Music; Formats: CD, LP, digital download

== Extended plays ==
Title	Details	Peak chart positions
Title	Details	JPN Oricon
Mask	Released: February 22, 2006; Label: Ki/oon; Formats: CD, digital download	110
Haishin Shimāsu. (配信しマース。; "Download")	Released: October 6, 2010; Label: Dum-Dum Rec; Formats: Digital download	—
Sing Sing Sing	Released: November 27, 2019; Label: Hisui; Formats: CD, digital download, streaming	—
"—" denotes releases that did not chart.

== Live albums ==
Title	Details
Live Luck	Released: November 6, 2013; Label: AWDR/LR2; Formats: CD, digital download

== Remix albums ==
Title	Details
The Other Side of Absolute Ego	Released: March 23, 2000; Label: Ki/oon; Formats: CD, LP

== Singles ==
=== As lead artist ===
List of singles, with selected chart positions
Title	Year	Peak chart positions	Album
Title	Year	JPN Oricon	Album
"Fuan na no" (不安なの; "Even Though I'm Anxious")	1995	—	Kittenish Love
"Dete Oide" (でておいで; "Come Out")	1995	—	Kittenish Love
"Home Sweet Home"	1996	—	Non-album single
"Drop"	1997	—	Nude
"Yureru Taion" (揺れる体温; "Changing Temperature")	1997	—	Lady Soul
"Catwalk"	1997	—	Lady Soul
"Yawarakai Hada" (やわらかい肌; "Soft Skin")	1998	73	Lady Soul
"Aishū to Ballad" (哀愁とバラード; "Sorrow and Ballads")	1999	48	Absolute Ego
"Aishita Anata wa Tsuyoi Hito" (愛したあなたは強いひと; "The You I Loved Was a Strong Person")	1999	42	Absolute Ego
"Yorokobi ni Saku Hana" (悦びに咲く花; "Flower Blooming Under Kindness")	1999	7	Absolute Ego
"Spleen"	2000	97	The Other Side of Absolute Ego
"Heart o Moyashite" (ハートを燃やして; "My Heart Burns")	2000	43	Material
"Shigatsu no Hero" (4月のヒーロー; "April Hero")	2001	61	Material
"Hoshi no Kuzu" (星ノクズ; "Stardust")	2001	96	Material
"Machi" (町; "Town")	2003	151	Irony
"My Dearest Friend"	2009	—	Devil's Hands
"Bara-iro no Sekai" (バラ色の世界; "Rose-colored World")	2009	—	Devil's Hands
"Innocent"	2012	—	Luck
"Aitai yo" (逢いたいよ; "I Miss You")	2020	—	Non-album single
"—" denotes items that did not chart.

=== As featured artist ===
List of singles, with selected chart positions
Title	Year	Peak chart positions		Album
Title	Year	JPN Oricon	JPN Hot	Album
"Grateful Days" (Dragon Ash featuring Aco, Zeebra)	1999	1	—	Viva La Revolution
"Tragicomic" (DJ Krush featuring Aco, Twigy)	2000	38	—	Non-album single
"Namida" (ナミダ; "Tears") (Takacha featuring Aco)	2008	—	49	Change
"—" denotes items that did not chart.

=== Promotional singles ===
List of singles, with selected chart positions
Title	Year	Album
"Devil's Hands"	2010	Devil's Hands
"Kitchen e Yōkoso" (キッチンへようこそ; "Welcome to the Kitchen") (Nabowa featuring Aco)	2010	Nabowa
"Miseinen" (未成年; "Underage")	2015	Valentine
"Bury a Friend"	2019	Sing Sing Sing
"I've Never Been in Love Before"	2019	Sing Sing Sing
"BlackBlackBlack"	2020	Non-album single
"—" denotes items that did not chart.

== Guest appearances ==
List of non-single guest appearances with other performing artists
Title	Year	Other artist(s)	Album
"Oh Honey"	1999	Moomin	"Kakegae no Nai Mono" (single)
"Black Opal"	1999	Satoshi Tomiie	Full Lick
"Oh Honey (G.M.A. Mix)"	1999	Moomin	"Ride On" (single)
"One Night"	1999	Tokyo Ska Paradise Orchestra	Justa Record Compilation Vol.1
"Oh Honey (DJ Masterkey Mix)"	2000	Moomin	Triple M
"Kungfu Lady" (カンフーレディー)	2007	—N/a	Rock for Baby
"Lovin' You"	2008	Rudebwoy Face	A Message To...
"Hoshi no Uta" (ほしのうた; "Star Song")	2008	The Broad Band	—N/a
"Life"	2009	Eccy	Narcotic Perfumer
"A Day"	2010	Ill	∀
"Sora" ("Sky")	2010	Pal@pop, Hisako Taguchi	feat. Plus
"Cause Addiction"	2011	Yamp Kolt	Yes
"Sonatine"	2011	Nouvo Nude	Flash Cube
"Tsuki, Kake" (月、欠け; "Moon, Wane")	2012	Toe	The Future Is Now
"Grateful Days"	2012	Dexpistols, Saito "JxJx" Jun, Junji Chiba	Lesson.07 "Via"
"Kemuri" ("Smoke")	2017	Mondo Grosso	Nandodemo Atarashiku Umareru / Attune / Detune
"Dai Main Climax" (大メインクライマックス; "Big Main Climax")	2017	Enya-Sang	Dai Main Climax
"Rainfall"	2020	Joint Beauty	Amatsuka

== Songwriting credits ==
List of songs written or co-written for other artists, showing year released and album name
Title	Year	Artist(s)	Album
"Aoi Hana" (青い花; "Blue Flower")	2008	Satomi Takasugi	"Relation (Ano Kaze o Tadotte)" (single) / Prism
"Colors"	2009	Maaya Sakamoto	Kazeyomi

== VHS/DVD ==
- 1821 - January 30, 1999
- Absolute Live - October 18, 2000
- Heart o Moyashite - March 23, 2001
- Shigatsu no Hero - April 25, 2001
- 2224 - June 20, 2001
