= Works '95–'05 =

Works '95-'05

Compilation album by Yoshinori Sunahara
- Released: March 21, 2007
- Genre: Electronic
- Length: 147:36
- Label: Ki/oon Records
- Producer: Yoshinori Sunahara

Yoshinori Sunahara chronology
Lovebeat (2001)	Works '95-'05 (2007)	No Boys, No Cry (2009)

Works '95–'05 is a compilation album by Yoshinori Sunahara. It was released on March 21, 2007. It peaked at number 107 on the Oricon Albums Chart.

== Track listing ==
Disc 1: Selected from Original Albums
No.	Title	Length
1.	"MFRFM (Music for Robot for Music)"	6:33
2.	"Stinger Stingray"	7:15
3.	"Elegant World"	6:31
4.	"Sun Song '80"	5:44
5.	"Life & Space"	6:42
6.	"Welcome to Japan"	4:46
7.	"Hypnotize"	6:00
8.	"747 Dub"	5:30
9.	"Balance"	7:15
10.	"Lovebeat"	7:25
11.	"The Center of Gravity"	7:43
Total length:		71:29

Disc 2: Selected from Remix & Produce Works
No.	Title	Artist(s)	Length
1.	"Saeko & Minilla (Sound in Space)"	Yoshinori Sunahara	4:13
2.	"Moon Walk"	Cornelius	7:13
3.	"Harusaki-Kobeni (Marin Mix)"	Akiko Yano	5:53
4.	"Gake~G-Surf (Yoshinori Sunahara Mix)"	Great3	6:20
5.	"Lotus Snack and Thinking Machine"	Towa Tei	1:31
6.	"First Class '77"	Fantastic Plastic Machine	6:44
7.	"Emotion Heater (Remixed by Yoshinori Sunahara)"	The Gentle People	5:17
8.	"Every Home a Prison (Yoshinori Sunahara Remix)"	Coldcut	5:27
9.	"Robot"	Yoshinori Sunahara	3:49
10.	"Yorokobi ni Saku Hana"	Aco	7:01
11.	"Yumegiwa Last Boy"	Supercar	4:08
12.	"Oasis (Y-Sunahara's Studio Re-Mix)"	Reggae Disco Rockers	5:11
13.	"By the Way (YSST Remix)"	Rip Slyme	4:12
14.	"Living Source"	Aiha Higurashi	4:45
15.	"Saint☆Ojisan (YSST RMX 2005)"	Denki Groove x Scha Dara Parr	4:28
Total length:			76:31

== Charts ==
Chart	Peak position
Japanese Albums (Oricon)	107
