= Metafive =

2014–2021 Japanese band

- Also known as: Yukihiro Takahashi & Metafive
- Origin: Japan
- Years active: 2014–2021
- Label: Warner Music Japan
- Members: Yukihiro Takahashi; Towa Tei; Keigo Oyamada; Yoshinori Sunahara; Tomohiko Gondo; Leo Imai

Metafive was a Japanese band that consisted of Yukihiro Takahashi, Keigo Oyamada, Yoshinori Sunahara, Towa Tei, Tomohiko Gondo, and Leo Imai.

== History ==
Yukihiro Takahashi originally assembled Keigo Oyamada, Yoshinori Sunahara, Towa Tei, Tomohiko Gondo, and Leo Imai to serve as the backing band on his 2014 concert tour, for which they were billed as Yukihiro Takahashi & Metafive. In 2015, the band changed their name to Metafive.

Takahashi has said that the name Yukihiro Takahashi & Metafive was a flippant reference to the band Hiroshi Uchiyamada & Cool Five.

The band played live at the 2014, 2015, and 2016 World Happiness Festivals, with British drummer Steve Jansen performing with the band in 2016.

Metafive's recordings charted in Japan, with their first studio album Meta (2016) reaching number 13 in the Oricon Albums Chart, and their EP Metahalf (2016) reached number 12 in the same chart.

4 years after their debut album release, on July 24, 2020, Metafive released a single available for streaming and download, entitled "Kankyo to Shinri / Environmental".

On May 17, 2021, Metafive announced that their second studio album METAATEM would be released on 11 August 2021. However, after controversy arose surrounding Oyamada's past history of bullying (resulting in his resignation from the 2020 Summer Olympics opening ceremony committee), the band cancelled the "METALIVE 2021" concert event that they had scheduled for 26 July 2021 at KT Zepp Yokohama, which would have been their first live performance in over 4 years. The band then announced on 28 July 2021—just two weeks before the scheduled release date for METAATEM—that the album release had been cancelled.

Metafive performed at Fuji Rock Festival '21 on 20 August 2021 with an alternate lineup consisting of Imai and Sunahara backed by "support" musicians Seiichi Nagai of Sōtaisei Riron and Kenichi Shirane of Great 3 and Imai's solo backing band. Metafive revealed on November 4 that they would stream a pre-recorded concert video entitled "METALIVE 2021" on November 20, and that people who purchase tickets to watch this stream would receive a CD or vinyl copy of the cancelled METAATEM album in the mail. The streamed concert video footage was recorded on July 26 at KT Zepp Yokohama with no live audience and a lineup consisting of Oyamada, Sunahara, Tei, Gondo, Imai, and Shirane (Takahashi announced on August 5 that he was taking a break from all musical activities to recover from brain surgery that he had undergone in the previous year). Customers who purchased tickets for the "METALIVE 2021" video stream received copies of the METAATEM album at the end of 2021. As the album was released exclusively to ticket-holders for the "METALIVE 2021" stream, copies were sold for high prices on secondhand marketplace websites such as Mercari and Yahoo! Auctions due to their scarcity.

It was announced that the Fuji Rock Festival '21 lineup of Metafive (Imai, Sunahara, Nagai and Shirane) would perform again at the OTODAMA'22 music festival in May 2022 under the name "METAATEM". The lineup subsequently revealed that they had changed their name to "TESTSET" and would continue to perform live under this name, beginning with a concert at Ebisu Liquidroom on April 14 with THE SPELLBOUND. At this concert, TESTSET performed a new song entitled "Carrion".

On 19 July 2022, Metafive announced that the METAATEM album would finally receive a wide release on September 14. However, the same announcement also referred to METAATEM as the band's "last album", confirming that they had broken up in the previous year. On 12 August 2022, TESTSET released their debut EP EP1 TSTST with no prior announcement.

Takahashi died in January 2023 at the age of 70, following a case of pneumonia resulting from the preexisting health issues that kept him away from activities with Metafive.

== Members ==
- Yukihiro Takahashi (of Yellow Magic Orchestra)
- Keigo Oyamada (a.k.a. Cornelius)
- Yoshinori Sunahara (formerly of Denki Groove)
- Towa Tei (formerly of Deee-Lite)
- Tomohiko Gondo
- Leo Imai

== Discography ==
=== Studio albums ===
- Meta (2016)
- Metaatem (2021)

=== Live albums ===
- Techno Recital as Yukihiro Takahashi & Metafive (2014)
- Metalive (2016)

=== EPs ===
- Metahalf (2016)

=== Singles ===
- "Split Spirit" as Yukihiro Takahashi & Metafive (2014)
- "Environmental" (2020)
- "The Paramedics" (2021)
