= ⊿ =

⊿ may refer to:

- Right triangle, a triangle containing a right angle
- Triangle (Perfume album), the third album of techno-pop group Perfume
