= Crossover (Yoshinori Sunahara album) =

Studio album by Yoshinori Sunahara
- Released: September 1, 1995
- Genre: Electronic
- Length: 74:39
- Label: Ki/oon Records
- Producer: Yoshinori Sunahara

Yoshinori Sunahara chronology
Crossover (1995)	Take Off and Landing (1998)

Crossover is the debut solo studio album by Yoshinori Sunahara. It was released on Ki/oon Records on September 1, 1995. Most of the album was created using samplers.

== Critical reception ==
Professional ratings
Review scores
Source	Rating
The Times	7/10

Charlie Porter of The Times gave the album a 7 out of 10, commenting that Sunahara's cover of Rah Band's "Clouds Across the Moon" is the best song on the album.

== Track listing ==
Japanese edition
No.	Title	Length
1.	"MFRFM (Music for Robot for Music)"	6:03
2.	"Stinger Stingray"	7:05
3.	"Whirlpool"	6:28
4.	"Silver Ripples"	6:36
5.	"The Long Vowel"	1:07
6.	"Huraloop"	6:50
7.	"Muddy Water"	6:34
8.	"Elegant World"	10:28
9.	"Clouds Across the Moon"	5:15
10.	"Overtime Work"	7:10
11.	"Huraloop (Audio Active Remix)"	5:47
12.	"MFRFM (Armed)"	5:43
Total length:		74:39

German edition
No.	Title	Length
1.	"MFRFM (Music for Robot for Music)"	6:03
2.	"Stinger Stingray"	7:05
3.	"Whirlpool"	6:28
4.	"Silver Ripples"	6:36
5.	"The Long Vowel"	1:07
6.	"Huraloop"	6:50
7.	"Muddy Water"	6:34
8.	"Elegant World"	10:28
9.	"Clouds Across the Moon"	5:15
10.	"Overtime Work"	7:10
Total length:		63:37
