= Painter Momopie =

1990 video game

- Developer: Sigma Enterprises
- Publisher: Sigma Enterprises
- Designer: Kr. Shimoyue
- Programmers: H. Tahara; H. Yamada; Junya Kobori
- Composer: Y. Sunohara
- Platform: Game Boy
- Release: JP: December 7, 1990
- Genre: Maze
- Modes: Single-player, multiplayer

Painter Momopie (Note: Japanese: ペインターモモピー, Hepburn: Peintā Momopī) is a 1990 maze video game developed and published by Sigma Enterprises for the Game Boy. The player controls the witch Momopie, with the objective being to clean all the floors in a castle, and also to avoid and counter the foes that are in it. Various spells that Momopie acquires throughout the game help her in cleaning the castle faster, and/or are able to stop the enemies within it, though at the cost of MP.

== Gameplay ==
Screenshot

The player controls a witch named Momopie, who must clean 33 floors of a castle. Each floor, arranged in a maze-like fashion, is made up of smaller tiles covered in dirt, in which Momopie must use her giant paintbrush to clean them with. In addition, various enemies are within the castle's walls, and touching them results in death. Momopie acquires spells throughout the game, both by progressing though the game and by a random spell that the King gives to her every few stages, that help her clean the castle faster, and also help address the enemies in various ways, by stunning them, killing them, or turning them into temporary allies. This comes at a cost of using up limited MP. However, it's refilled after each stage, and the MP limit is raised every once in a while.

== Release ==
Painter Momopie was released in Japan on December 7, 1990.

== Reception ==
Reception

Review score
Publication	Score
Famitsu	21/40

Painter Momopie received mixed reviews. Famitsu gave it a total score of 21/40. German magazine Power Play gave it a 47 out of 100.

Retrospective views on the game have been fairly positive. A retrospective review by Hardcore Gaming 101 called it a 'hidden gem' on the Game Boy, although criticized the lack of save features and level reuse towards the end of the game.
