= Lady Soul (disambiguation) =

Lady Soul may refer to:

In music:

- Lady Soul a 1968 album by Aretha Franklin
- Lady Soul (song) a 1986 single by The Temptations
- Lady Soul (Aco album) a 1998 album by Japanese singer-songwriter Aco
