= Triangle (Perfume album) =

Studio album by Perfume
- Released: July 8, 2009
- Recorded: 2008–2009 at Contemode Studio, Tokyo, Japan
- Genres: J-pop; electropop; dance-pop; electro house
- Length: 54:48
- Label: Tokuma Japan Communications
- Producer: Yasutaka Nakata

Perfume chronology
Game (2008)	Triangle (2009)	JPN (2011)

Singles from Triangle
- 1. "Love the World" Released: July 9, 2008; 2. "Dream Fighter" Released: November 19, 2008; 3. "One Room Disco" Released: March 25, 2009

Triangle (published as ⊿) is the second studio album by Japanese girl group Perfume. It was released on July 8, 2009, through Tokuma Japan. Triangle builds upon the breakthrough success of their previous album Game (2008), with Yasutaka Nakata returning as executive producer.

Primarily an electropop record, Triangle takes influence from 1980s and 1990s music, with traces of disco and house. Its lyrical themes revolve around love and courage, particularly from a woman's perspective. Triangle received generally positive reviews from critics, who praised Perfume and Nakata on expanding their sonic identity, though some criticized its vocal processing.

It was preceded by the singles "Love the World", "Dream Fighter", and "One Room Disco", with the former becoming their first number one on the Oricon chart. Triangle itself was a commercial success, becoming their second chart-topping album and receiving a platinum certification from the RIAJ. Perfume embarked on their second nationwide tour shortly after its release.

== Background and recording ==
Perfume saw breakthrough success with their 2007 single "Polyrhythm", which led to its parent album Game (2008) becoming the group's first chart-topper. Work on their second studio album had already begun by July 2008, as they released their ninth major label single "Love the World". Perfume announced an upcoming, untitled album at the group's Disco! Disco! Disco! concert on May 10, 2009. They notably performed "Night Flight", then unreleased, which was being aired in Morinaga ice cream commercials starring the group.

As executive producer, Yasutaka Nakata returned as the album's sole composer, arranger and lyricist. Member Kashiyuka commented that she was delighted with the recording process as it featured material differing from their previous output, in particular the largely instrumental and plainly-spoken songs of "Take Off" and "Speed of Sound": "I could never have imagined [that] from Perfume before. [...] But I was really happy and thought, 'Oh, I can do something new like that with Perfume.'"

In an interview with Rockin'On Japan, Kashiyuka was happy at the idea that Nakata no longer felt compelled to create conventional idol music for Perfume and could now experiment with their sound, closer in vein to his work with Capsule. A-chan expressed ambivalence at the notion of Perfume's music putting production over performance, but ultimately decided that it wasn't the case as long as Perfume continued to combine their three voices. A-chan's comments attracted controversy as some perceived it to be critical of Nakata, leading their agency Amuse to release a statement saying they were taken out of context.

In sessions for prior albums, Nakata asked the members to sing "coldly" or with "less emotion", however, Nocchi noted a slight kayōkyoku influence to Perfume's vocals on Triangle as Nakata sang with a "unique quirk" on the demos. An interviewer for Barks asked if A-chan gained more confidence in her singing, to which she replied, "[In the past] I didn't enjoy recording at all. It sometimes made me feel sad when I felt like I had to "sing exactly how I was told," [...] or that I was only seen as an instrument. But this time I thought I'd have fun [...] I thought I'd sing it the way I like." She recorded her parts for "Zero Gravity" and "Kiss and Music" with her natural inflections.

== Composition ==
Triangle is a continued exploration into Perfume's electropop sound. It is a relative departure from Game, moving from the latter's club-heavy direction and instead showcasing various electronic styles—disco, blog house and Japanese technopop among them. Many writers considered the sonic palette of Triangle to be more eclectic and varied, with All About distinguishing it as "herbivorous" compared to its predecessor. Some considered it to have a loose aviation theme, which member Nocchi noted as a recurring motif. Ian Martin of The Japan Times described the album as having an "air of glacial cool".

The album opener, "Take Off", is a breakbeat intro featuring the members counting down from eight to zero in English. Its overlapping synth arpeggios are reminiscent of Yoshinori Sunahara's album The Sound of ’70s (1998), with other comparisons to Nakata's work for the Liar Game film. It lasts for 48 seconds before leading into the pure pop of "Love the World" and "Dream Fighter". The fourth track, "Edge (Triangle Mix)", is the longest on the album, clocking in at 8 minutes and 43 seconds. Featuring an aggressive, "sharply-arranged" electro production, A-chan described it as having "a sense of challenge", while Nocchi said that it is about "living your limited time to the fullest". The song was called "Ed Banger dancefloor nihilism" by Patrick St. Michel of The Japan Times. "Night Flight" is styled after 1980s technopop in the vein of Yellow Magic Orchestra. It invokes "Absolute Ego Dance" and "Rydeen" from the band's album Solid State Survivor (1979). The song draws from 8-bit, disco, and electroclash, and uses an aviation motif in its description of love.

Triangle's midsection is described as being "a little darker" in "[exuding] a chic mood". "Kiss and Music" is R&B and electro-funk, with elements of breakbeat and downtempo. It utilizes a groovy bassline and a Moog synth. Its lyrics have been noted for its adult themes, depicting the "subtle distance between a man and a woman". A-chan saw "Kiss and Music" as the song pulling all the album tracks together. Perfume's Japanese spin on black music was compared to Yellow Magic Orchestra's 1980 cover of "Tighten Up", and Speed's 1999 single "Long Way Home". "Zero Gravity" is a 1990s house track. All About viewed it as a nod to the New York house scene, particularly invoking the party mixes of Body & Soul. There are traces of a Brazilian influence due to its chord progression likened to bossa nova. The track is noted for its feeling of "weightlessness" and sense of eternity, with a "floating melody that is hard to grasp". Further comparisons have been drawn to the work of Yoko Kanno and Fantastic Plastic Machine. "I Still Love U" is 1980s synthpop with elements of Eurobeat. Some saw it as an homage to earlier idol music, citing Wink and Miho Nakayama. All About compared it to English band New Order and their 1987 songs "True Faith" and "Touched by the Hand of God". "I Still Love U" utilizes a "harsh" Yamaha DX7 bass synth, and many noted the song's wistful emotionality.

"The Best Thing" smoothly transitions into "Speed of Sound", sharing a deep house production. The former is "bouncy" and pop-oriented, featuring a Stuart Price-esque intro and a chorus sung entirely in English. The latter takes influence from Latin house and disco as the members recite "inorganic" English words over a percussive groove. "Speed of Sound" has been compared to Masters at Work and Aril Brikha. Triangle's penultimate number is the disco-styled French house of "One Room Disco", before reaching its conclusion with the ballad "Negai (Album Mix)". It features a new orchestral arrangement with lyrics about an unrequited love. A-chan found the album version to be "a little bit lonely" compared to its single release.

== Title and artwork ==
In June 2009, Perfume's official website revealed the album title as the symbol ⊿, accompanied by a simple graphic of an isosceles right triangle. Through the group's Tokyo FM radio show Perfume Locks, the members clarified that it is read as toraianguru (トライアングル) or "triangle" in English.

In an interview with Yahoo! Music, Perfume explained that the title evolved from flying and vehicular-related ideas, until they settled on shapes, from which triangles were decided as Yasutaka Nakata thought it was fashionable. The members were left "perplexed", but found it to be a perfect fit as they had three members and it was their third album. A-chan further explained that an isosceles right triangle (as opposed to other triangles) was specifically chosen to emphasize that Perfume is a combined effort of all three, as opposed to one member on top.

The album artwork for Triangle was photographed by Hiroshi Nomura, under the art direction of Kazuaki Seki with styling by Ken Uchizawa. It features the three members surrounded by a large triangle object. Uchizawa dressed them in all white in the image of "a young girl changing into an grown woman", symbolizing Perfume's evolution and maturity.

For its limited edition release, the artwork was further simplified to a metal plate debossed with a triangle and the group's name. As a part of the album's promotional campaign, both physical props were put on display in records stores around Shinjuku and Shibuya the weekend of its release.

== Critical reception ==
Triangle received generally favorable reviews from music critics. Many praised Yasutaka Nakata for his club-friendly approach to pop music. Yuki Sugioka of Hotexpress opined, "Nakata's paradox is that the music is [not intended for karaoke], yet it still makes you want to hum along [...] With Perfume, he is presenting a future that is half a step ahead of the scene". Takaji Deshima of Bounce magazine called Triangle a "stunning result proving straight away that [Perfume] still has an edgy presence".

Perfume's "maturity" was a focal point in Musico's review of Triangle, who characterized the album as "fresh" and "moody". Kiyohiko Koike of Listen Japan commended its stylistic range that keeps Nakata's deep bass sound and Perfume's expressive singing. CD Journal opined that listeners would get further enjoyment out of the album once its nuances are understood. Other reviewers echoed this atmospheric departure from Game, with Excite Music finding its predecessor's high energy to have cooled-down and become "dancier". For All About, writer Hiroaki Shikata and his panel of commentators distinguished Triangle as more "refined" than the "stimulating" nature of Game. Fumizuki Watanabe of Musicnet thought that the album transcends its "futuristic" label in becoming "otherdimensional".

Adam Greenberg of AllMusic was more mixed in his review, finding it to lack individuality as Perfume loses their personality under the autotune. Despite finding production highlights elsewhere, they wrote: "For basic background music at a pop-heavy dance party, something like Triangle would be hard to beat. For musical exploration and complexity, it's an album that would be hard not to beat." Ian Martin of The Japan Times was more favorable towards their vocal treatment and praised Nakata for his "inventive production trickery", but ultimately criticized Triangle for its "bland" latter half that demonstrates his limitations: "like his 1990s uber-producer forbear Tetsuya Komuro, Yasutaka Nakata may be spreading his talents too thinly."

In 2017, Rui Takeshima of Pop Master wrote that Triangle is "rich in variation not found on previous albums", and that the album represents a key shift in Nakata's production role towards realizing Perfume's commercial viability.

== Track listing ==
All lyrics are written by Yasutaka Nakata; all music is composed by Yasutaka Nakata.

CD
No.	Title	Length
1.	"Take Off"	0:49
2.	"Love the World"	4:33
3.	"Dream Fighter"	4:54
4.	"Edge (Triangle Mix)"	8:43
5.	"Night Flight"	5:21
6.	"Kiss and Music"	2:35
7.	"Zero Gravity"	4:54
8.	"I Still Love U"	4:33
9.	"The Best Thing"	4:24
10.	"Speed of Sound"	3:59
11.	"One Room Disco" (ワンルーム・ディスコ; Wan Rūmu Disuko)	5:09
12.	"Negai (Album Mix)" (願い; Wish)	4:59

Limited edition bonus DVD
No.	Title	Length
1.	"I Still Love U (Special Video Clip)"
2.	"Night Flight (Live at Yoyogi First Gymnasium May 10th, '09)"
3.	"Edge (Live at Yoyogi First Gymnasium May 10th, '09 Triangle Version)"
4.	"Love the World (TV Spot)"
5.	"Dream Fighter (TV Spot)"
6.	"One Room Disco (TV Spot)"

== Personnel ==
From All Music.com.

- Iku Aoki - Director
- Kohei Furumai - Executive Producer
- Tatsuro Hatanaka - Supervisor
- Nomura Hiroshi - Photography
- Sumio Matsuzaki - Supervisor
- Kiyoe Mizusawa - Design Coordinator
- Masahiro Nakawaki - Director
- Ayaka "A-Chan" Nishiwaki - Group Member
- Yuka "Kashiyuka" Kashino - Group Member
- Ayano "Nocchi" Omoto - Group Member
- Yokichi Osato - Supervisor
- Masako Osuga - Make-Up
- Kazuaki Seki - Art Direction
- Yuki Shimajiri - Hair Stylist
- Masahiro Shinoki - Executive Producer
- Hirose Shiraishi - Executive Producer
- Ken Uchizawa - Stylist
- Yasutaka Nakata - Arranger, Composer, Engineer, Mastering, Mixing, Producer
- Mayuko Yuki - Design

== Charts ==
Release	Chart	Peak position	Debut sales (copies)	Sales total (copies)
July 8, 2009	Oricon Daily Charts	1	90,153	332,000
July 8, 2009	Oricon Weekly Charts	1	210,576	332,000
July 8, 2009	Oricon Monthly Charts	2	250,697	332,000
July 8, 2009	Oricon Yearly Charts	20	307,609	332,000

== Certifications ==
Region	Certification	Certified units/sales
Japan (RIAJ)	Platinum	250,000^{^}
^{^} Shipments figures based on certification alone.
