= Irony (disambiguation) =

Irony is a literary or rhetorical device, in which there is an incongruity or discordance between what one says or does.

Irony or Ironic may also refer to:

== Music ==
- Irony (album), a 2003 album by ACO
- "Irony" (Wonder Girls song), 2007
- "Irony" (ClariS song), 2010
- "Ironic" (song), a 1996 song by Alanis Morissette
- Irony, album by Sungha Jung
- Irony, album by Kevin Field
- "Ironically", a song by The Doubleclicks

== Other uses ==
- On the Concept of Irony with Continual Reference to Socrates, an 1841 philosophical dissertation on irony by Danish philosopher Søren Kierkegaard
- Irony mark, a proposed punctuation mark
- Telba Irony, Brazilian statistician
- Irony display, see Kitsch

== See also ==
- Ironik (James Christian Charters, born 1988), British musician
- Iron (disambiguation)
