= Clouds Across the Moon =

- Artwork for original release

Single by RAH Band

from the album Mystery
- B-side: Clouds Across the Moon (Solar Horizon Mix)
- Released: 18 March 1985
- Genre: Jazz-funk, synthpop, new wave, space disco
- Length: 6:49 (album version); 4:12 (single edit)
- Label: RCA
- Songwriter: Richard Anthony Hewson
- Producer: Richard Anthony Hewson

RAH Band singles chronology
| "Are You Satisfied? (Funka Nova)" (1984) | "Clouds Across the Moon" (1985) | "Sorry Doesn't Make It Anymore" (1985) |

"Clouds Across the Moon" is a song written by Richard Anthony Hewson. It was released as a single on 18 March 1985 on his studio group the RAH Band's album Mystery. The single reached the top 10 of the singles charts in the UK, The Netherlands and Sweden.

== Background ==
In an interview with Smash Hits on 8 May 1985, Richard Anthony Hewson said that the song took place in the future where there was a 100-year long war on Mars. In regard to the phone call featured in the song, Hewson said that it was "much more difficult to make these calls since British Telecom was privatized." Hewson also mentioned that the phone call cost about "five million six hundred and forty thousand pounds and forty pence." It has been suggested the song's reference to "Flight 247" was included to garner airplay from BBC Radio 1 who at one time had broadcast on the wavelength of 247 metres on the medium wave band. This however is unlikely as Radio 1 had switched to broadcasting on 275 & 285 metres in 1978, nearly 7 years before the song's release.” The vocals were performed by Hewson's wife Liz.

== Charts ==
=== Peak position ===
| Chart (1985) | Peak position |
|---|---|
| Belgium (Ultratop 50 Flanders) | 6 |
| Europe (European Hot 100 Singles) | 46 |
| France (SNEP) | 28 |
| Ireland (IRMA) | 9 |
| Italy (Musica e dischi) | 19 |
| Netherlands (Dutch Top 40) | 5 |
| Netherlands (Single Top 100) | 8 |
| Sweden (Sverigetopplistan) | 9 |
| UK Singles (OCC) | 6 |

=== Year-end charts ===
| Chart (1985) | Position |
|---|---|
| Belgium (Ultratop 50 Flanders) | 48 |
| Netherlands (Dutch Top 40) | 41 |
| Netherlands (Single Top 100) | 54 |

== Remixes ==
- "Clouds Across the Moon" was first remixed in 1999 by German house group Tiefschwarz. The remix peaked at No. 85 on the GfK Entertainment Charts.
- "Clouds Across the Moon 07" is a remix of the original recording. The vocals were re-recorded by vocalist Emma Charles and the single was released by Shocking Music in July 2007. Hewson states that the single was remixed and released in response to "the phenomenal demand by fans and DJs, for a modern mix of the 1985 'classic'". As well as new vocals, the new version has a more jazz-funk feel than the original, but still retains the original synthesizer and drum machine.

== Covers ==
- In 1995, Japanese techno producer Yoshinori Sunahara covered the song for his debut album, Crossover.
- In 1998, Norwegian electronic duo Frost covered the song for their debut album, Bedsit Theories. It peaked at No. 13 on the VG-lista chart.
- In 2022, West End singer Joanna Riding performed the song during an episode of the same name in British TV Series McDonald & Dodds, accompanied only by a piano.
