= Chocolat (singer) =

Japanese singer (born 1978)

- Born: February 15, 1978 (age 48)
- Origin: Tokyo, Japan
- Genres: Shibuya-kei
- Years active: 1997–present
- Labels: Epic Records (Japan) 1997–2000; Warner Bros. Japan 2000–
- Member of: Chocolat & Akito
- Website: http://www.chocolat.ne.jp/

Chocolat (ショコラ, shokora) (born February 15, 1978) is a Japanese singer from the greater Tokyo area in Japan. Her first single, "Chocolat a la mode", was released in 1997 on Epic Records (Japan). Her younger twin sister Heaco is also a singer. In 1998, Chocolat married the musician Akito Katayose from the band GREAT3 in Maui, Hawaii, which subsequently became her favorite place. In 2000, she moved from Epic Records to Warner Bros. Japan and later that year recorded the duet single "VERANDA" with her husband, credited as Akito Katayose featuring Chocolat. In 2005, she and her husband formed the group Chocolat & Akito.

== Discography ==
=== Singles ===
- "Chocolat a la mode" (ショコラ・ア・ラ・モード, Shokora a ra mōdo) (May 21, 1997) Produced by shibuya-kei group Neil & Iraiza.
- "Blue de Happy ga ii BLUE MINT BLUE" (ブルーでハッピーがいい BLUE MINT BLUE) (July 1, 1997) Produced by Hideki Kaji
- "Twinkle Starberry" (November 1, 1997)
- "Fuyu e Sumō" (冬へ進もう) (February 1, 1998)
- "Mōhitosu no Ame" (もうひとつの雨) (May 21, 1998)
- "Kagami no Yoru" (鏡の夜) (November 21, 1998)
- "Baseball and Elvis Presley" (ベースボールとエルビス・プレスリー, bēsubōru to erubisu pursurii) (July 1, 1999)
- "FARGO" (November 20, 1999)
- "VERANDA" (April 12, 2000) (as Akito Katayose featuring Chocolat), later used in a Nikka Cidre beverage advertisement)
- "Roller Girl" (August 8, 2001)

=== Albums ===
- one too many Chocolat (May 30, 1998)
- Hamster (ハムスター) (August 21, 1999)
- henry (August 29, 2001)
- CHOCOLATE NOTES (October 29, 2003)
- Chocolat & Akito (as Chocolat & Akito) (September 19, 2005)
- Tropical (as Chocolat & Akito) (February 14, 2007)
- Duet (as Chocolat & Akito) (November 28, 2012)
- Chocolat & Akito Meets The Mattson 2 (as Chocolat & Akito) (March 2, 2016)

=== Video ===
- "Star Mint" (March 1, 1998)
- "Chocolat Video" (July 5, 2000)
- "Walking in the Park" (live, as Chocolat & Akito)

== See also ==
- Kahimi Karie
- Rei Harakami

== Sources ==
Much of this article was translated from the equivalent article in the Japanese Wikipedia, as retrieved on March 3, 2008.
