= Take Off and Landing =

Studio album by Yoshinori Sunahara
- Released: May 21, 1998
- Genre: Electronic
- Length: 70:23
- Label: Ki/oon Records
- Producer: Yoshinori Sunahara

Yoshinori Sunahara chronology
Crossover (1995)	Take Off and Landing (1998)	The Sound of '70s (1998)

Take Off and Landing is the second solo studio album by Yoshinori Sunahara. It was released on Ki/oon Records on May 21, 1998. It is centered around the fictional Tokyo Underground Airport.

== Critical reception ==
Professional ratings
Review scores
Source	Rating
AllMusic	2.5/5 stars

Ben Davies of AllMusic gave the album 2.5 out of 5 stars, writing, "most tracks are too repetitive and drawn out."

Snoozer placed the album at number 26 on the "50 Best Albums of the Year" list.

== Track listing ==
No.	Title	Length
1.	"Information of TUA"	2:49
2.	"Cross Wind Take Off"	3:41
3.	"Magic Sunset Street"	5:53
4.	"Sony Romantic Electro Wave"	4:35
5.	"Sun Song '80"	5:33
6.	"2300 Hawaii"	7:18
7.	"Count Down"	1:22
8.	"Journey Beyond the Stars"	7:03
9.	"Life & Space"	8:11
10.	"No Sun"	8:02
11.	"The Good Timing of the World of Love Song"	2:41
12.	"Summer"	5:06
13.	"My Love Is Like a Red, Red Rose"	3:23
14.	"Welcome to Japan"	4:47
Total length:		70:23
