= One Room Disco =

Single by Perfume

from the album Triangle
- B-side: "23:30"
- Released: March 25, 2009
- Recorded: 2009
- Genre: J-pop, dance-pop
- Length: 5:09
- Label: Tokuma Japan Communications
- Songwriter: Yasutaka Nakata
- Producer: Yasutaka Nakata

Perfume singles chronology
| "Dream Fighter" (2008) | "One Room Disco" (2009) | "Fushizen na Girl/Natural ni Koishite" (2010) |

Music video
- "One Room Disco" on YouTube

"One Room Disco" (ワンルーム・ディスコ, Wan Rūmu Disuko) is the ninth major single by Japanese band Perfume. It was released on March 25, 2009, as a CD-only version and CD+DVD version. The single reached number one on the Oricon weekly chart on April 6. The limited edition CD+DVD version included a form that, when filled out and sent in, entered fans into a draw for prizes such as a backstage pass, a visit at home by Perfume, "Perfume Original Goods" gifts, and T-shirts.

== Background and release ==
The A-side "One Room Disco" is a mid-to-fast tempo composition containing electro, bubblegum pop, and disco elements. The song was announced to be "a spring-like, danceable song." It features a filtered bass guitar. Some phrases in the song refer to classic songs, such as "Video Killed the Radio Star" by The Buggles and "Give Me Up" by Michael Fortunati. Lyrically, One Room Disco is about the expectations and anxieties of a new life in a new town during spring, which is the season when one in Japan typically graduates, enters the workforce, or moves.

The B-side "23:30" is a lounge-influenced track featuring drums and a synthesized harp. It uses elements of shibuya-kei, chiptune and bossa nova.

== Reception ==
The single sold 77,325 copies on its first day and 99,825 copies in its first week. By the end of 2009, the single sold 101,016 copies.

== Music video ==
Kazuaki Seki directed the music video. The member's outfits on the single cover were used in the recording. The music video was first released on June 18, 2013, on Perfume's official YouTube channel. The video is included in the DVD version of the song.

=== Synopsis ===
The music video begins with the three members standing in front of six red, white, and blue rooms. The rooms are spread across two levels and have light-up disco floors. The group starts dancing and then each walks into one of the rooms. The camera cuts to Nocchi holding a tea kettle in the white room and throwing it on her right to the red room. All three members exit the rooms. Kashiyuka enters the white room as Nocchi enters the red room, slipping and dropping an apple that Kashiyuka catches. Shopping bags pop out from the floor as the members exit and return with pillows, glitter, and pieces of fruit. The camera pans to A-chan levitating fruits from her bag. A-chan enters the white room on the second floor with an apple in her hand. She drops it into the blue room on her right, with the apple enlarging, causing the building to tremble. This startles Nocchi and Kashiyuka, so they leave the rooms and enter the blue and red rooms on the second level. Nocchi inspects the apple while Kashiyuka appears sideways at the door. Kashiyuka throws a small pink ball across the room, which expands as it reaches the blue room, hitting Nocchi, holding the giant apple. Nocchi fails to get the apple out of the door, so A-chan picks it up and is surprised when she finds it is minuscule. Kashiyuka and Nocchi dance in the white room on the first floor before A-chan joins them. Nocchi and Kashiyuka flee the room. Kashiyuka brings a stool for A-chan to sit on; Nocchi pushes a wheeled wall with a window. A spotlight shines on A-chan, holding a golden foil star, as city skyscraper cutouts are placed before her. Kashiyuka sits on a stool in front of the skyscrapers while A-chan and Nocchi wave sticks with stars at the ends at her. The buildings move away, and there are three rooms, now in space with the members dancing on a black and white striped floor in front of the rooms. The video ends with the giant apple on a light-up disco floor in the blue room.

== Track listing ==
=== CD ===
| No. | Title | Length |
|---|---|---|
| 1. | "One Room Disco" | 5:09 |
| 2. | "23:30" | 5:17 |
| 3. | "One Room Disco" (Original Instrumental) | 5:06 |
| 4. | "23:30" (Original Instrumental) | 5:17 |
| Total length: | | 20:49 |

=== DVD ===
| No. | Title | Length |
|---|---|---|
| 1. | "One Room Disco" (video clip) |

== Charts ==
| Chart | Peak position |
|---|---|
| Oricon Daily Singles Chart | 1 |
| Oricon Weekly Singles Chart | 1 |
| Oricon Monthly Singles Chart | 2 |
| Oricon Yearly Singles Chart | 59 |
| Billboard Japan Hot 100 | 1 |

== Certifications ==
| Region | Certification | Certified units/sales |
|---|---|---|
| Japan (RIAJ) | Gold | 100,000^{^} |
| Japan (RIAJ) Ringtone | Gold | 100,000^{*} |
^{*} Sales figures based on certification alone.^{^} Shipments figures based on certification alone.
