= Devil's Hands =

Studio album by Aco
- Released: 6 October 2010
- Label: Naturalize Management

Aco chronology
Aco Best: Girl's Diary (2007)	Devil's Hands (2010)	Luck (2012)

Singles from Devil's Hands
- 1. "My Dearest Friend" Released: 2 September 2009; 2. "Barairo no Sekai" Released: 4 November 2009

Devil's Hands is an album by Japanese singer-songwriter Aco, released on 6 October 2010. It was Aco's eighth studio album.

== Track listing ==
1. Devil's Hands
2. Mirror
3. Nora Nekoko (のらねここ)
4. Ahaha!!!
5. Ikareta Honey (イカれたハニー)
6. Bloody na Fantastic (bloodyなfantastic)
7. My Dearest Friend
8. Barairo no Sekai (バラ色の世界)
