= Dream Fighter =

- CD and digital artwork.

Single by Perfume

from the album Triangle
- B-side: "Negai"
- Released: November 19, 2008
- Recorded: 2008 (Shibuya, Tokyo)
- Genre: Electropop
- Length: 4:54
- Label: Tokuma Japan Communications
- Songwriter: Yasutaka Nakata
- Producer: Yasutaka Nakata

Perfume singles chronology
"Love the World" (2008)	"Dream Fighter" (2008)	"One Room Disco" (2009)

"Dream Fighter" is the 8th major single recorded by Japanese girl group Perfume for their second studio album, Triangle (2009). It was written, composed, arranged and produced by the Japanese musician and Capsule member Yasutaka Nakata. The single included the B-side track, "Negai", of which a remix version appeared on the parent album. It was premiered on November 9, 2008, as the second single from the album in Japan. It was released on June 19, 2013, in European and Oceanic regions, and on June 25 in North America. Musically, "Dream Fighter" is an electropop song, influenced by dance music.

On its release, the track received generally favourable reviews from music critics. Some highlighted the song as one of Perfume's best singles from their album and their career, and commended the production and commercial appeal. It achieved success in Japan, peaking at number two on the Oricon Singles Chart and Billboard's Japan Hot 100 chart. It was certified gold, twice, by the Recording Industry Association of Japan (RIAJ) for physical and digital shipments of 100,000 units.

An accompanying music video was shot by Kazuaki Seki; it shows the girls performing the song in a black room, with additional computer generated imagery (CGI). With additional promotion through Japanese commercials, the song has been performed on several concert tours by Perfume, including their 2008 Budoukan and their 2013 Perfume World Tour.

== Background and release ==
"Dream Fighter" was written, composed, arranged and produced by the Japanese musician and Capsule member Yasutaka Nakata. Alongside this, it was recorded, mixed and mastered by him. The song was recorded in 2008 at Contemode Studios, Shibuya, Tokyo, by Nakata. Alongside the album's remaining material, "Dream Fighter" has partial rights by Nakata through Yahama Music Communications. The single also included the B-side track, "Negai", which a remix version appeared on the parent album. It was premiered on November 9, 2008, as the second single from the group's second studio album, Triangle (2009). The single was also released on June 19, 2013, in European and Oceanic regions, and June 25 in North America. (Note: On June 19 and June 23, 2013, Perfume's musical releases (prior to the group's third studio album JPN) were released globally with Universal Music Japan.)

The CD single contains both the single, its B-side track and their instrumental versions. The DVD version has the same tracks and a bonus disc of the music video to the single. The artwork shows Perfume sitting in front of a grey background, with digitally-added lighting circulating them. Both formats include a bonus lyric booklet, and a standard booklet that includes three shots of each member holding the digital-added lights. The DVD format included a limited edition flyer, where the first 100 customers who send it back to Tokuma Japan Communications before a certain date received bonus merchandise by the band.

== Composition ==
Musically, "Dream Fighter" was described as a technopop song, influenced by electronic dance music. A staff editor from CD Journal reviewed the parent album, and noted elements of electronic music. The reviewer also commented that the song included musical elements of dance music, though "not too heavy". A staff editor from Selective Hearing, and AllMusic editor Adam Greenberg, noted elements of electropop through the songs compositions. Hot Express writer Yuki Sugioka labelled it a "hard dancefloor-oriented" track. A Channel-Ai staff member called it one of Perfume's "most interesting" tracks from their discography. The editor continued saying, "The vocals sound more natural because the vocoder isn’t adjusted to the levels that are similar to the previous works, the instrumental flows smoothly using mid-high tones that provide the 'dreamy' feel..."

The group's vocals are processed with autotune and vocoder post-production tools, which is notable throughout the group's earlier work. Martin, who also wrote about the song in The Japan Times, said that the girls vocals, "are obliterated beneath a blizzard of vocoder and an auto-tuning permafrost, all feeding into the music’s air of glacial cool..." With the lyrics discussing the girls fight to make their dreams come true, critics have analysed the lyrical content in their reviews. A second editor at CD Journal reviewed the single's release, and described the song's lyrical content as "cheerful". A staff editor from Amazon Japan labelled the song a "girl anthem", and described the lyrical content as "Cinderella–esque".

== Critical response ==
"Dream Fighter" received positive reviews from most music critics. A CD Journal staff member reviewed the parent album, and labelled the song a "refreshing listen", in comparison to the group's earlier work. A staff editor at Selective Hearing was positive in their review; they stated, "There is the familiar electro-pop sound that made everyone love them on 'Love the World' and 'Dream Fighter', so it wasn't a bad start to the album." Ian Martin, writing for The Japan Times, was fairly positive in his review, labelling it a "pure, spine tingling pop gem". However, he felt that the song's producer, Yasutaka Nakata, was "limiting" his production skills by adding a "rhythmical hiccup" into the song. Martin had also contributed into writing the group's AllMusic biography, and listed the track as one of Perfume's best tracks from the album, and their discography. Yuki Sugioka from Hot Express was positive, commending the song's composition, Nakata's production skills, and labelled it "widely enjoyable" and "catchy".

A staff editor from Channel Ai was very positive in their review, awarding the song four-and-a-half stars out of five. They labelled the track the group's best single in 2008, and went on to say, "So, yes, the song is definitely different from the others. Change is good... for a while though." However, the editor did criticize the group's solo performance during the verse sections. An Amazon staff member highlighted the song as one of the best tracks from the album. A Japanese website, Goo Ranking, hosted a poll for their audience to vote for the best Perfume song. As a result, "Dream Fighter" was ranked at number seven.

== Commercial performance ==
In Japan, "Dream Fighter" debuted at number two on the Oricon Singles Chart; it sold 70,873 units in its first week of sales. The song slipped outside the top ten in its second week, staying at number 11. Overall, the single stayed in the top 200 chart for 17 weeks; it is the group's fourth longest charting single in that record chart. By the end of 2008, the single was ranked at number 80 on Oricon's Annual 2008 chart; it sold 89,493 units by the end of the year. The single has sold over 108,000 units in Japan, and was certified gold by the Recording Industry Association of Japan (RIAJ) for physical shipments of 100,000 units in that region.

The single charted at number two on Billboard's Japan Hot 100 chart; it is the group's second single to miss the top spot, after "Baby Cruising Love". It was certified gold by RIAJ for digital sales of 100,000 units. Tallied with physical and digital sales, it has shifted over 208,000 units; it is the group's sixth best selling physical single based on Oricon's database.

== Music video ==
The accompanying music video was directed by Kazuaki Seki. The group's outfits from the single cover sleeve was used again for the video shoot. The music video was released on November 19, 2008, through Space Shower television in Japan. The music video appeared on the DVD single. The music video also appeared on Perfume's DVD compilation sets for JPN, and Perfume Clips (2014).

=== Synopsis ===
The music video opens with the group member's standing in front of a black backdrop. The camera zooms to Perfume member, Nocchi, as all three members start dancing to the song. As the camera begins zooming out and in, with videos shots of different parts of the members, Perfume members Kashiyuka and A-Chan stand up and dance together. As the introduction chorus finishes, the girls evaporate into CGI bubbles. The bubbles flow off screen, which then intercepts into the group members dancing, and repeats after each shot of the bubbles forming. A-Chan is seen singing in a small room, with coloured lights projecting against her. Nocchi is then seen in the same room, by herself, with coloured lighting projected onto her; this then repeats with Kashiyuka. During the second chorus, the bubbles become bigger and are placed behind and above the group. Throughout the entire video, it has the group dancing to the song, whilst the bubbles are moving behind, in front, up top, or at the bottom of the group. Inter cut scenes with the girls individually in the small room are included.

== Promotion and live performances ==
The song has been included in two of Perfume's compilation albums: their second greatest hits album Love the World (2012), and their limited edition vinyl box set Perfume Complete LP Box (2016). "Dream Fighter" was used for a Japanese commercial promoting the Eisai's "Chocolate BB" product.

The single has been performed on several tours conducted by Perfume. It first appeared on the group's 2009 Budoukan concert tour, which was included during the encore segment. Since then, "Dream Fighter" has been performed on their 2009 Second Concert tour, their 2010 Tokyo Dome tour, and as the encore track on their 2012 JPN concert tour. The song was included on their Perfume World Tour concerts in New York City, Los Angeles, Paris, London, Singapore, and South Korea. According to Coral Rucker at Neon Tommy Online, he said of the song's performance in Los Angeles; "A song that had touched people’s hearts and Perfume's too. It was their theme song for the night."

== Track listing ==
- Japanese CD single
1. "Dream Fighter" – 4:54
2. "Negai" (願い; lit. Wish) – 4:48
3. "Dream Fighter" (Instrumental) – 4:54
4. "Negai" (願い; lit. Wish) (Instrumental) – 4:48
- Japanese CD and DVD single
1. "Dream Fighter" – 4:54
2. "Negai" (願い; lit. Wish) – 4:48
3. "Dream Fighter" (Instrumental) – 4:54
4. "Negai" (願い; lit. Wish) (Instrumental) – 4:48
5. "Dream Fighter" (Video clip) – 4:54
- Digital download
1. "Dream Fighter" – 4:54
2. "Negai" (願い; lit. Wish) – 4:48
3. "Dream Fighter" (Instrumental) – 4:54
4. "Negai" (願い; lit. Wish) (Instrumental) – 4:48

== Credits and personnel ==
Details adapted from the liner notes of the Triangle album.

- Ayano Ōmoto – vocals
- Yuka Kashino – vocals
- Ayaka Nishiwaki – vocals
- Yasutaka Nakata – producer, composer, arranger, mixing, mastering.
- Kazuaki Seki – video director

== Charts and certifications ==
=== Charts ===
Chart (2008–2009)	Peak position
Japan Daily Chart (Oricon)	2
Japan Weekly Chart (Oricon)	2
Japan Monthly Chart (Oricon)	8
Japan Yearly Chart (Oricon)	80
Japan Hot 100 (Billboard)	2

=== Certifications ===
Region	Certification	Certified units/sales
Japan (RIAJ) Physical single	Gold	100,000^{^}
Japan (RIAJ) Full-length ringtone	Gold	100,000^{*}
^{*} Sales figures based on certification alone.^{^} Shipments figures based on certification alone.

== Release history ==
Region	Date	Format	Label
Japan	November 2, 2011	CD single; DVD single; digital download	Tokuma Japan Communications; Universal Music Japan
Australia	June 19, 2013	Digital download	Universal Music Japan
New Zealand	June 19, 2013	Digital download	Universal Music Japan
United Kingdom	June 19, 2013	Digital download	Universal Music Japan
Germany	June 19, 2013	Digital download	Universal Music Japan
Ireland	June 19, 2013	Digital download	Universal Music Japan
France	June 19, 2013	Digital download	Universal Music Japan
Spain	June 19, 2013	Digital download	Universal Music Japan
Taiwan	June 19, 2013	Digital download	Universal Music Japan
United States	June 25, 2013	Digital download	Universal Music Japan
Canada	June 25, 2013	Digital download	Universal Music Japan
