= Mystery (RAH Band album) =

Studio album by RAH Band
- Released: 1985
- Genre: Jazz-funk, synthpop
- Length: 49:39
- Label: RCA Records
- Producer: Richard Anthony Hewson

RAH Band chronology
Upper Cuts (1984)	Mystery (1985)	Past, Present & Future (1985)

Singles from Mystery
- 1. "Are You Satisfied (Funka Nova)" Released: 12 January 1985; 2. "Clouds Across the Moon" Released: 30 March 1985; 3. "Sorry Doesn't Make it Anymore" Released: 29 June 1985

Mystery was the seventh studio album released by RAH Band, released in 1985. The album hit #60 on the UK Albums Chart making it the only time that the band has ever hit the chart.

== Track listing ==
Mystery includes the following tracks.

No.	Title	Length
1.	"Clouds Across the Moon"	6:49
2.	"Night Wind"	7:42
3.	"Sorry Doesn't Make It Anymore"	4:23
4.	"Float"	5:38
5.	"Mystery Boy"	7:14
6.	"Are You Satisfied (Funka Nova)"	6:02
7.	"Shadow Of Your Love"	6:27
8.	"Out On The Edge"	5:24

== Personnel ==
- Richard Anthony Hewson - guitar, keyboards, synthesizer
- The Mat Roule Horns - brass
- Tiya Nohnyen - drums
- Liz Hewson - lead vocals
- The Rah La Las - backing vocals
- Pete King - saxophone
- Peter Boita - synthesizer (for "Clouds Across the Moon" and "Night Wind")
- Irvine Arditti - strings
- Daniel Hewson Jr. - wind chimes

== Charts ==
Chart (1985)	Peak position
Swedish Albums (Sverigetopplistan)	42
UK Albums (OCC)	60

== Reception ==
Billboard described the album as a "quirky pop" work with a "distinctly English flavor". Meanwhile, Fred Dollar of Hi-Fi News & Record Review liked the album's blend of disco and jazz, but didn't recommend the album for others to listen to. Mark Ellen of Smash Hits gave the album an 8 out of 10, with special praise for the album's percussion sounds.
