= Lovebeat =

Studio album by Yoshinori Sunahara
- Released: May 23, 2001
- Genre: Electronic
- Length: 58:28
- Label: Ki/oon Records
- Producer: Yoshinori Sunahara

Yoshinori Sunahara chronology
| The Sound of '70s (1998) | Lovebeat (2001) | Works '95–'05 (2007) |

Lovebeat is the fourth solo studio album by Yoshinori Sunahara. It was released on Ki/oon Records on May 23, 2001.

== Critical reception ==
Professional ratings
Review scores
| Source | Rating |
|---|---|
| Snoozer | favorable |
| The Wire | favorable |

Ken Hollings of The Wire wrote, "Sunahara's fourth solo album finds the Techno dreamer extraordinaire returning to basics in its reappraisal of origins and influences."

Snoozer placed the album at number 8 on the "50 Best Albums of the Year" list.

== Track listing ==
| No. | Title | Length |
|---|---|---|
| 1. | "Earth Beat" | 4:56 |
| 2. | "Balance" | 6:24 |
| 3. | "In and Out" | 5:00 |
| 4. | "Lovebeat" | 7:26 |
| 5. | "Spiral Never Before" | 5:38 |
| 6. | "Echo Endless Echo" | 3:13 |
| 7. | "Hold'on Tight" | 4:49 |
| 8. | "Sun Beats Down" | 5:48 |
| 9. | "Bright Beat" | 7:30 |
| 10. | "The Center of Gravity" | 7:43 |
| Total length: | | 58:28 |
