= No Boys, No Cry (soundtrack) =

Soundtrack album by Yoshinori Sunahara
- Released: July 29, 2009
- Genre: Electronic
- Length: 53:51
- Label: Ki/oon Records
- Producer: Yoshinori Sunahara

Yoshinori Sunahara chronology
Works '95–'05 (2007)	No Boys, No Cry (2009)	Liminal (2011)

No Boys, No Cry is a soundtrack album by Yoshinori Sunahara for the 2009 film Boat. It was released on July 29, 2009. It peaked at number 88 on the Oricon Albums Chart.

== Track listing ==
No.	Title	Length
1.	"Sunset Blue (Opening Version)"	1:58
2.	"Rain Noise"	1:40
3.	"Black Water Surface"	1:21
4.	"Transport"	4:25
5.	"Tiptoeing"	2:05
6.	"Float"	4:32
7.	"Green Pattern"	4:25
8.	"Arista"	2:18
9.	"Piano Room"	1:35
10.	"Echo Drums"	1:13
11.	"Monologue"	3:54
12.	"The Stairs"	2:24
13.	"Charge"	1:51
14.	"Wave Motion"	2:26
15.	"Invisible Silence"	3:14
16.	"Underwater Ballet"	2:58
17.	"Sunset Blue"	6:31
18.	"Deadly Lovely (Movie Version)"	5:01
Total length:		53:51

== Charts ==
Chart	Peak position
Japanese Albums (Oricon)	88
