= Mask (Aco album) =

Studio album by Aco
- Released: 22 February 2006
- Genre: Electropop, pop rock
- Label: Sony Music Entertainment (Japan) Inc.

Aco chronology
Irony (2003)	Mask (2006)	Aco Best: Girl's Diary (2007)

Singles from Mask
- 1. "Ya-yo!"

Mask is the seventh studio album by Japanese singer-songwriter Aco, released on 22 February 2006. It is a mini-album consisting of six songs and with a total playing time of 25 minutes.

Mask marks a significant transition in Aco's style from ambient, electronic sounds of her previous two albums, Material and Irony, to lighter, electro-pop music.

Track 3 is a cover of the song of the same name by The Waitresses.

== Track listing ==
1. Ya-yo!
2. Guilty
3. I Know What Boys Like
4. Rikunoritō (リクノリトウ)
5. Cover Grrrl
6. Fuan nano (New Ver.) (不安なの(New Ver.))
