= Aco (musician) =

Japanese singer (born 1977)

- Born: February 3, 1977 (age 49); Aichi Prefecture, Japan
- Occupation: Singer
- Years active: 1995 – present
- Label: Sony Music Japan

A..C..O (born February 3, 1977) is a Japanese singer. She made her debut in 1995 with the pop single "Fuan nano" (不安なの). She is a part of Sony Music Japan. She explores different musical styles, with the albums Absolute Ego and Material displaying electronica influences. Absolute Ego was produced by ex-Denki Groove keyboardist, Yoshinori Sunahara and The Other Side of Absolute Ego album contains remixes by Tricky, DJ Krush, and Silent Poets.

In 2003, after a two-year hiatus, she enlisted the help of the avant-garde audio-visual performance group portable [k]ommunity for her quieter, more delicate album, Irony. AllMusic described Irony as "one of the most beautiful albums to come out of Japan in 2003", with the music compared to an "airy lullaby".

== Discography ==
=== Studio albums ===
- 1996: Kittenish Love
- 1997: Nude
- 1998: Lady Soul
- 1999: Absolute Ego
- 2001: Material
- 2003: Irony
- 2006: Mask
- 2007: Aco Best: Girl's Diary
- 2010: Devil's Hands
- 2012: Luck
- 2013: TRAD
- 2015: Valentine

=== Remix albums ===
- 2000: The Other Side of Absolute Ego
