= Richard Anthony Hewson =

English record producer (born 1943)

- Born: Richard Anthony Hewson; 17 November 1943 (age 82); Stockton-on-Tees, County Durham, England
- Genres: Jazz-funk, synthpop, electronic
- Occupations: Record producer; arranger; conductor; multi-instrumentalist
- Instrument: Various
- Years active: 1966–present
- Labels: DJM, RCA, various
- Website: www.therahband.com

Richard Anthony Hewson (born 17 November 1943) is an English producer, arranger, conductor and multi-instrumentalist, who created the studio group RAH Band.

== Career ==
Hewson began in the late 1960s as an arranger, and worked with musicians such as the Beatles ("I Me Mine" and "The Long and Winding Road"), the Bee Gees (Melody), James Taylor (his first album, including the first version of "Carolina in My Mind"), Herbie Hancock, Clifford T. Ward, Supertramp, Pilot (Pilot), Diana Ross, Carly Simon, Art Garfunkel, Leo Sayer, Paul McCartney (Thrillington), Mary Hopkin ("Those Were The Days"), Al Stewart, Chris de Burgh, Fleetwood Mac and Chris Rea. He also arranged strings on several Cliff Richard albums, I'm Nearly Famous (1976), Every Face Tells a Story (1977) and Green Light (1978). Hewson also worked with the British band Jigsaw, including arrangements for their hit single, "Sky High".

Apart from his own RAH Band project, in the 1980s he was a producer for Toyah Willcox, Five Star, and Shakin' Stevens. He was a co-producer and conductor of the London Philharmonic Orchestra on Cliff Richard's 1983 live album Dressed for the Occasion (which included the UK hit single "True Love Ways"). Later, he wrote music for television shows and advertising spots. His song "Pearly" was recorded by The Pearls.

== The RAH Band ==
Hewson founded The RAH Band – of which he was the sole member and which took its name from his initials – in 1977, to release an instrumental called "The Crunch". The piece climbed to number 6 in the UK Singles Chart. The song also peaked at number 16 in Australia. Hewson played all the musical instruments himself. Although seen as belonging to the synthpop genre, the arrangement did not use synthesisers, only conventional guitar and keyboards with pedal effects. He was later featured on Top of the Pops. A number of jazz funk releases followed. The second big hit single for the RAH Band was in 1985 when the soul ballad, "Clouds Across the Moon", also reached number 6 in the UK chart. Vocals were provided by Hewson's former wife Liz, also known as "Dizzy Lizzy".

In July 2007, Hewson released a remixed "Clouds Across the Moon '07", which featured vocalist Emma Charles.

The RAH band's releases were issued under a variety of record labels, including Good Earth Records, DJM, KR Records, TMT Records and RCA.

== Discography ==
=== Albums ===
==== Studio albums ====
Title	Album details	Peak chart positions		
Title	Album details	UK	AUT	SWE
The Orchestrah (as the Orchestrah)	Released: 1974; Label: Philips; Formats: LP	—	—	—
Love Is (as the Richard Hewson Orchestra)	Released: 1976; Label: Splash/Private Stock; Formats: LP	—	—	—
Contemporary Themes (as Richard Hewson)	Released: 1978; Label: Standard Music Library; Formats: LP	—	—	—
The Crunch & Beyond (as RAH Band)	Released: May 1978; Label: Ebony; Formats: LP, MC	—	3	—
RAH Band (as RAH Band)	Released: 8 May 1981; Label: DJM; Formats: LP, MC	—	—	—
Going Up (as RAH Band)	Released: 1983; Label: TMT; Formats: LP, MC	—	—	—
Mystery (as RAH Band)	Released: March 1985; Label: RCA; Formats: CD, LP, MC	60	—	42
Something About the Music (as RAH Band)	Released: 2002; Label: Self-released; Formats: CD; Originally set for release in 1987	—	—	—
"—" denotes releases that did not chart or were not released in that territory.

==== Compilation albums ====
Title	Album details
Upper Cuts	Released: 27 April 1984; Label: S.O.U.N.D. Recordings; Formats: LP; Mini-album
Past, Present & Future	Released: October 1985; Label: RCA; Formats: LP, MC
The Best of Rah Band	Released: October 1995; Label: Music Club; Formats: CD, MC
Greatest Hits	Released: 1995; Label: Connoisseur Collection; Formats: CD
Perfumed Garden: The Best of Rah Band	Released: 25 November 1996; Label: Trattoria/Polystar; Formats: CD; Japan-only release
21st Century Remixes	Released: 8 December 2004; Label: Polystar; Formats: CD; Japan-only release
The Very Best of the RAH Band	Released: November 2005; Label: Shocking Music; Formats: CD
The Definitive Collection	Released: 2009; Label: Toolboxx; Formats: CD; Continental Europe-only release
12 Inch Remixes	Released: 18 September 2009; Label: Toolboxx; Formats: digital download
Unreleased Trax from the 70s to the 2000s	Released: 5 February 2010; Label: Toolboxx; Formats: digital download
Producers Choice	Released: 24 April 2020; Label: Atjazz; Formats: 2xLP, digital download

=== EPs ===
Title	Album details
Love Without End (as the Richard Hewson Orchestra)	Released: January 1977; Label: EMI; Formats: 7"
Satisfied E.P. (as RAH Band)	Released: 2000; Label: Reform House; Formats: 12"; Germany-only release
Chain'd (as RAH Band)	Released: 10 September 2010; Label: Shocking Music; Formats: digital download

=== Singles ===
(Unless stated, the main artist is RAH Band)

Title	Year	Peak chart positions									Album
Title	Year	UK	AUS	BEL (FL)	FRA	GER	IRE	IT	NL	SWE	Album
"Spicks and Specks" (as the Richard Hewson Orchestra; Portugal-only release)	1971	—	—	—	—	—	—	—	—	—	Melody (soundtrack)
"Love for Hire" (as the Richard Hewson Orchestra)	1976	—	—	—	—	—	—	—	—	—	Love Is
"Shark Bite" (as the Richard Hewson Orchestra)	1976	—	—	—	—	—	—	—	—	—	Non-album single
"Love Bite" (as the Richard Hewson Orchestra; US and the Netherlands-only release)	1976	—	—	—	—	—	—	—	—	—	Love Is
"The Crunch"	1977	6	16	—	—	—	—	—	—	—	The Crunch & Beyond
"What Shall We Do When the Disco's Over?" (as the Richard Hewson Orchestra)	1977	—	—	—	—	—	—	—	—	—	Non-album singles
"Jiggery Pokery"		—	—	—	—	—	—	—	—	—	Non-album singles
"Is Anybody There?"	1978	—	—	—	—	—	—	—	—	—	The Crunch & Beyond
"Tokyo Flyer"	1980	—	—	—	—	—	—	—	—	—	Non-album single
"Falcon"	1980	35	—	—	—	—	—	—	—	—	RAH Band
"Slide"	1981	50	—	—	—	—	—	—	—	—	RAH Band
"Downside Up"	1981	—	—	—	—	—	—	—	—	—	RAH Band
"Riding on a Fantasy"	1981	—	—	—	—	—	—	—	—	—	Going Up
"Winter Love"	1982	—	—	—	—	—	—	—	—	—	Going Up
"Perfumed Garden"	1982	45	—	—	—	—	—	—	—	—	Going Up
"Tears and Rain"	1982	—	—	—	—	—	—	—	—	—	Going Up
"Sam the Samba Man"	1983	80	—	—	—	—	—	—	—	—	Going Up
"Messages from the Stars"	1983	42	—	—	—	—	—	—	—	—	Going Up
"Questions (What You Gonna Do)"	1983	109	—	—	—	—	—	—	—	—	Non-album single
"Are You Satisfied? (Funka Nova)"	1985	70	—	—	—	—	—	—	—	—	Mystery
"Clouds Across the Moon"	1985	6	—	6	28	—	5	19	8	9	Mystery
"Sorry Doesn't Make It Anymore"	1985	90	—	—	—	—	—	—	—	—	Mystery
"What'll Become of the Children?"	1985	—	—	—	—	—	—	—	—	—	Past, Present & Future
"The Crunch '85"	1985	—	—	—	—	—	—	—	—	—	Past, Present & Future
"Sweet Forbidden"	1986	—	—	—	—	—	—	—	—	—	Non-album single
"Dream Street" (featuring Nadia Flasch)	1986	—	—	—	—	—	—	—	—	—	Non-album single
"Across the Bay"	1987	—	—	—	—	—	—	—	—	—	Non-album single
"Morocko" (as Shock Taktix)	1987	—	—	—	—	—	—	—	—	—	Non-album single
"Run 4 the Sun"	1987	—	—	—	—	—	—	—	—	—	Non-album single
"This Is Not Jazz"/"Time Beat Time" (as Shock Taktix)	1988	—	—	—	—	—	—	—	—	—	Non-album single
"Nice Easy Money (Intruders in the House)"	1988	—	—	—	—	—	—	—	—	—	Non-album single
"Time Keeps Tearing Us Apart (The Homecoming)"	1988	—	—	—	—	—	—	—	—	—	Non-album single
"Silverbird"	1989	—	—	—	—	—	—	—	—	—	Non-album single
"Looks Like I'm In Love Again" (as Key West featuring Erik)	1993	46	184	—	—	—	—	—	—	—	Non-album single
"Let Your Love Shine" (as Key West & P. P. Arnold)	1993	—	—	—	—	—	—	—	—	—	Non-album single
"Let Your Love Shine" (as Key West & Debbie Sharp)	1995	—	—	—	—	—	—	—	—	—	Non-album single
"Living for the Nightlife"	1996	—	—	—	—	—	—	—	—	—	Non-album single
"Clouds Across the Moon" (Tiefschwarz remix; Germany-only release)	1999	—	—	—	—	85	—	—	—	—	Non-album single
"Turn My Love Around"	2008	—	—	—	—	—	—	—	—	—	Non-album single
"Living for the Nitelife" (featuring Susanna)	2008	—	—	—	—	—	—	—	—	—	Non-album single
"No Way (To Treat Your Lover)" (featuring Susanna)	2009	—	—	—	—	—	—	—	—	—	Non-album single
"Vapour Trails" (featuring Susanna)	2009	—	—	—	—	—	—	—	—	—	Non-album single
"Space Gypsy"	2011	—	—	—	—	—	—	—	—	—	Non-album single
"Vapour Trails" (featuring Funmilayo)	2014	—	—	—	—	—	—	—	—	—	Non-album single
"Gypsy Girl"	2018	—	—	—	—	—	—	—	—	—	Non-album single
"Silly Questions" (featuring Nina Schofield)	2019	—	—	—	—	—	—	—	—	—	Non-album single
"One Day We'll Smile Again" (featuring Bella Hutton)	2021	—	—	—	—	—	—	—	—	—	Non-album single
"—" denotes releases that did not chart or were not released in that territory.
