= Absolute Ego =

Studio album by Aco
- Released: December 15, 1999
- Genres: Contemporary R&B, trip hop, art pop
- Length: 56:04
- Label: Ki/oon Records
- Producers: Yoshinori Sunahara, Hideki Yamashita, Satoshi Tomiie, Stuart Matthewman

Aco chronology
Lady Soul (1998)	Absolute Ego (1999)	The Other Side of Absolute Ego (2000)

Singles from Absolute Ego
- 1. "Aishu to Ballad" Released: January 30, 1999; 2. "Aishita Anata wa Tsuyoi Hito" Released: July 1, 1999; 3. "Yorokobi ni Saku Hana" Released: November 10, 1999; 4. "Spleen" Released: February 23, 2000

Absolute Ego is the fourth studio album by Japanese singer-songwriter Aco. It was released via Ki/oon Records on December 15, 1999. It peaked at number 8 on the Oricon Albums Chart.

== Track listing ==
No.	Title	Japanese title	Length
1.	"Prologue"		0:39
2.	"Yorokobi ni Saku Hana"	悦びに咲く花	6:30
3.	"Spleen"		5:50
4.	"Aishita Anata wa Tsuyoi Hito (The Director's Cut)"	愛したあなたは強いひと	4:42
5.	"Black Maybe"		4:44
6.	"Kyo made no Yuutsu"	今日までの憂鬱	4:35
7.	"Natsu no Hi"	夏の陽	3:52
8.	"Ame no Hi no Tame ni"	雨の日の為に	4:35
9.	"Intensity (You Are)"		4:06
10.	"Aishuu to Ballad"	哀愁とバラード	4:48
11.	"Hitotsu no Kumori"	ひとつのくもり	4:24
12.	"Absolute Ego"		0:46
13.	"Taiyo"	太陽	6:19

== Charts ==
Chart	Peak position
Japanese Albums (Oricon)	8
