= Aco Best: Girl's Diary =

Greatest hits album by Aco
- Released: 19 December 2007
- Genre: Soul, R&B, electronica, experimental, trip hop
- Label: Sony Music Entertainment (Japan) Inc.

Aco chronology
Mask (2006)	Aco Best: Girl's Diary (2007)	Devil's Hands (2010)

Aco Best: Girl's Diary is a compilation album by Japanese singer-songwriter Aco, containing released singles from all her seven albums. It was released on 19 December 2007. It consists of two discs.

== Track listing ==
=== Disc 1 ===
1. Fuan nano (不安なの)
2. Deteoide (Original Mix) (でておいで (Original Mix))
3. Home Sweet Home
4. Drop
5. Yureru Taion (TYO Mix) (揺れる体温 (TYO Mix))
6. Yawarakai Hada (やわらかい肌)
7. Aishuu to Ballade (哀愁とバラード)
8. Aishita Anata wa Tsuyoi Hito (愛したあなたは強いひと)
9. Atsui Memai (Album Version) (熱いめまい (Album Version))
10. Nemureru Neko (眠れるネコ)
11. Lady Soul (Day-lite Version)
12. Aitai wa (あいたいわ)
13. Hitotsu no kumori (ひとつのくもり)

=== Disc 2 ===
1. Yorokobi ni Saku Hana (悦びに咲く花)
2. Amenohino Tameni (雨の日の為に)
3. Heart wo Moyashite (ハートを燃やして)
4. Spleen (Sunahaea's Studio Remix)
5. Shigatsu no Hero (４月のヒーロー)
6. Guilty
7. Hoshi no Kuzu (星ノクズ)
8. Machi (町)
9. Melancholia (メランコリア)
10. Sora Shiranu Ame (空シラヌ雨)
11. Akai Shishu (赤い刺繍)
12. Hans
13. Ya-yo!
