= Nude (Aco album) =

Studio album by Aco
- Released: 21 April 1997
- Genre: Soul, R&B, downtempo, trip hop
- Label: Sony Music Entertainment (Japan) Inc.

Aco chronology
Kittenish Love (1996)	Nude (1997)	Lady Soul (1998)

Singles from Nude
- 1. "DROP" Released: May 21, 1997

Nude (ヌード Nuudo) is the second studio album by Japanese singer-songwriter Aco, released on 21 April 1997.

All music and lyrics by Aco.

== Track listing ==
1. "Koi no akubi" (恋のあくび)
2. "Kokoro iro" (ココロ色)
3. "DROP"
4. "Mabuta no yume" (まぶたの夢)
5. "Namida Bottle" (涙ボトル)
6. "Koiji" (恋路)
7. "NUDE" (ヌード)
8. "Aitaiwa" (あいたいわ)
9. "Yoru no Sketch" (夜のスケッチ)
10. "DEEP KISS"
11. "Niji" (acoustic guitar version) (虹 (acoustic guitar version))
