= The Sound of '70s =

Studio album by Yoshinori Sunahara
- Released: November 11, 1998
- Genre: Electronic
- Length: 47:45
- Label: Ki/oon Records
- Producer: Yoshinori Sunahara

Yoshinori Sunahara chronology
Take Off and Landing (1998)	The Sound of '70s (1998)	Lovebeat (2001)

Alternative cover
- German edition cover

The Sound of '70s is the third solo studio album by Yoshinori Sunahara. It was released on Ki/oon Records on November 11, 1998. It was created as an homage to Pan American World Airways.

== Critical reception ==
Professional ratings
Review scores
Source	Rating
AllMusic	3/5 stars
Snoozer	favorable

Ben Davies of AllMusic gave the album 3 out of 5 stars, calling it "a far cry from an essential purchase."

== Track listing ==
Japanese edition
No.	Title	Length
1.	"Theme from Take-Off (Magic Sunset)"	2:39
2.	"The New World Break"	5:41
3.	"Clipper's Discotheque Break"	6:07
4.	"Sun Song '70 (Bossa Version)"	4:16
5.	"Rhodes Funky Dub (Interlude)"	3:50
6.	"747 Dub"	5:30
7.	"Swing the Clipper"	4:12
8.	"Theme from Landing (Live for Living)"	2:53
Total length:		47:45

German edition
No.	Title	Length
1.	"Theme from Take-Off (Magic Sunset)"	2:39
2.	"The New World Break"	5:41
3.	"Clipper's Discotheque Break"	6:07
4.	"Sun Song '70 (Bossa Version)"	4:16
5.	"Love Beat"	6:37
6.	"Rhodes Funky Dub (Interlude)"	3:50
7.	"747 Dub"	5:30
8.	"Swing the Clipper"	4:12
9.	"Theme from Landing (Live for Living)" / "(silence)" / "(hidden track)"	35:46
Total length:		74:38
