= The Other Side of Absolute Ego =

Remix album by Aco
- Released: March 23, 2000
- Genre: Soul, electronica
- Length: 38:18
- Label: Ki/oon Records
- Producer: Silent Poets, DJ Krush, Shuya Okino, Hajime Yoshizawa, Yoshinori Sunahara, Alpha, Shazz, Tricky

Aco chronology
Absolute Ego (1999)	The Other Side of Absolute Ego (2000)	Material (2001)

The Other Side of Absolute Ego is a remix album by Aco. It consists of remixes of selected songs from Aco's fourth studio album Absolute Ego. It was released via Ki/oon Records on March 23, 2000.

== Track listing ==
No.	Title	Japanese title	Length
1.	"Yorokobi ni Saku Hana (Silent Poets Remix/S.W.E Dub Ver.01)"	悦びに咲く花	6:36
2.	"Aishuu to Ballad (DJ Krush Remix)"	哀愁とバラード	5:46
3.	"Aishita Anata wa Tsuyoi Hito (Electric Sheep Mix)"	愛したあなたは強いひと	4:49
4.	"Spleen (Y.Sunahara's Studio Remix)"		6:26
5.	"Ame no Hi no Tame ni (Alpha Remix)"	雨の日の為に	6:18
6.	"Kyo made no Yuutsu (Universal Soul Mix)"	今日までの憂鬱	3:49
7.	"Natsu no Hi (Tricky Remix)"	夏の陽	4:31
