= Lady Soul (Aco album) =

Studio album by Aco
- Released: September 19, 1998
- Genre: Contemporary R&B, soul, pop
- Length: 56:45
- Label: Ki/oon Records

Aco chronology
Nude (1997)	Lady Soul (1998)	Absolute Ego (1999)

Singles from Lady Soul
- 1. "Yureru Taion" Released: April 1, 1998; 2. "Yawarakai Hada" Released: August 21, 1998

Lady Soul is the third studio album by Japanese singer-songwriter Aco. It was released via Ki/oon Records on September 19, 1998. It peaked at number 33 on the Oricon Albums Chart.

== Track listing ==
No.	Title	Japanese title	Length
1.	"Yureru Taion (After Hours Session)"	揺れる体温	6:14
2.	"Yawarakai Hada"	やわらかい肌	5:14
3.	"Lady Soul (Day-lite Version)"		6:32
4.	"Kowaresoyo (Future Classics Version)"	こわれそうよ	5:22
5.	"Catwalk"		6:21
6.	"Atsui Memai (Album Version)"	熱いめまい	4:55
7.	"Nemureru Neko"	眠れるネコ	6:04
8.	"Inside My Love"		4:58
9.	"Lady Soul (Twi-lite Version)"		5:35
10.	"Futatsu no Te no Hira"	ふたつのてのひら	5:20

== Charts ==
Chart	Peak position
Japanese Albums (Oricon)	33
