= Yoshinori Sunahara =

Yoshinori Sunahara 砂原 良徳
- Born: September 13, 1969 (age 56); Sapporo, Hokkaido, Japan
- Origin: Tokyo, Japan
- Genres: Electronic
- Occupations: Record producer, DJ
- Years active: 1991–present
- Label: Ki/oon Music
- Website: ysstinfo.wixsite.com/ysst

Yoshinori Sunahara (砂原 良徳, Sunahara Yoshinori; born September 13, 1969) is a Japanese record producer and DJ from Sapporo, Hokkaido. He is a former member of Denki Groove. He was also a member of Metafive.

== Discography ==
=== Studio albums ===
- Crossover (1995)
- Take Off and Landing (1998)
- The Sound of '70s (1998)
- Lovebeat (2001)
- Liminal (2011)

=== Compilation albums ===
- Works '95–'05 (2007)

=== Soundtrack albums ===
- No Boys, No Cry (2009)

=== EPs ===
- 708090 (1998)

=== Singles ===
- "Journey Beyond the Stars" (1998)
- "Lovebeat" (2002)
- "Subliminal" (2010)
- "Kamisama no Iu Tōri" (2010) (with Junji Ishiwatari and Etsuko Yakushimaru)

=== Productions ===
- Aco - "Yorokobi ni Saku Hana", "Kyō Made no Yūutsu", and "Taiyō" from Absolute Ego (1999)
- Aco - "4 Gatsu no Hero" from Material (2001)
- Supercar - "Yumegiwa Last Boy" from Highvision (2002)

=== Remixes ===
- Cornelius - "Moon Walk" from 96/69 (1996)
- Great 3 - "Gake ~ G-Surf (Yoshinori Sunahara Mix)" from "Glass Roots" (1996)
- Imajuku - "Horizon (Y.Sunahara Rmx)" from Cat's Cradle (1999)
- Towa Tei - "Higher (Y.Sunahara's Studio Mix)" from Lost Control Mix (1999)
- Aco - "Spleen (Y.Sunahara's Studio Remix)" from The Other Side of Absolute Ego (2000)
- Fantastic Plastic Machine - "Honolulu, Calcutta (Sunahara Yoshinori Mix)" from Les Plus (2001)
- Pizzicato Five - "Icecream Meltin' Mellow (Marin Mix 2)" from Pizzicato Five in the Mix (2001)
- Yukihiro Fukutomi - "Equality (YSST Rmx 2005)" from Equality Remixes (2005)
- Denki Groove - "Shangri-La (Y.Sunahara 2009 Remodel)" from "Upside Down" (2009)
- Rip Slyme - "Good Times (Bad Times Remix)" from Bad Times (2010)
- Yuko Ando - "Ellroy (Sunahara Yoshinori Remix)" from "Kagayakashiki Hibi" (2011)
- Sakanaction - "Lightdance (YSST Remix 2011)" from "Bach no Senritsu o Yoru ni Kiita Sei Desu" (2011)
- (((sssurrounddd))) - "Kūchū Bunkai Suru I Love You (Yoshinori Sunahara Remix)" from "Kūchū Bunkai Suru I Love You" (2013)
