= Material (Aco album) =

Studio album by Aco
- Released: May 23, 2001
- Genre: Contemporary R&B, trip hop, art pop
- Length: 63:54
- Label: Ki/oon Records
- Producer: Adrian Sherwood, Skip McDonald, Hideki Yamashita, Shin Kono, Tosh Masuda, Michiharu Shimoda, Yoshinori Sunahara

Aco chronology
The Other Side of Absolute Ego (2000)	Material (2001)	Irony (2003)

Singles from Material
- 1. "Heart o Moyashite" Released: November 1, 2000; 2. "4 Gatsu no Hero" Released: February 21, 2001; 3. "Hoshi no Kuzu" Released: May 9, 2001

Material is the fifth studio album by Japanese singer-songwriter Aco. It was released via Ki/oon Records on May 23, 2001. It peaked at number 19 on the Oricon Albums Chart.

== Track listing ==
No.	Title	Japanese title	Length
1.	"Melancholia"	メランコリア	6:35
2.	"Hoshi no Kuzu"	星ノクズ	4:56
3.	"Canary wa Naku"	カナリアは鳴く	3:04
4.	"Shinsei Romanticist"	真正ロマンティシスト	6:46
5.	"Sora Shiranu Ame"	空シラヌ雨	4:33
6.	"Ask Me"		3:59
7.	"This Woman's Work"		3:35
8.	"4 Gatsu no Hero"	４月のヒーロー	4:53
9.	"Time"		4:37
10.	"Interlude"		4:47
11.	"Anata ni Sasagu Uta"	貴方に捧ぐうた	5:25
12.	"Heart o Moyashite (Special Branch Mix)"	ハートを燃やして	5:32
13.	"Hoshi no Kuzu (Dub Version)"	星ノクズ	5:05

== Charts ==
Chart	Peak position
Japanese Albums (Oricon)	19
