= Irony (album) =

Studio album by ACO
- Released: 18 June 2003
- Genre: Experimental, ambient, electronica, art pop
- Label: Sony Music
- Producer: múm Taeji Sawai

ACO chronology
Material (2001)	Irony (2003)	Mask (2006)

Singles from Irony
- 1. "町" Released: July 7, 2004

Irony (stylised as irony) is an album by ACO, released in 2003. The album was produced by Sawai Taeji of portable[k]ommunity, as well as others. The single from the album, "Machi", was produced by the Icelandic electronic group Múm.

Irony reached #42 on the Oricon weekly chart, where it remained for four weeks, selling approximately 12,000 copies.

== Track listing ==
1. "00000" – 1:19
2. "赤い刺繍" – 3:48
3. "lang" – 4:47
4. "hans" – 4:01
5. "町" – 4:02
6. "裏庭" – 5:30
7. "巣箱" – 2:32
8. "irony" – 3:17
9. "空白の種" – 5:08
10. Kitchen" – 2:13
