= Great 3 =

Japanese rock band

- Also known as: GREAT3
- Origin: Japan
- Genres: Alternative rock, indie pop
- Years active: 1994–present
- Labels: Bodicious; EMI Japan; Toshiba EMI
- Members: Akito Katayose (vocals, guitar); Kenichi Shirane (vocals, drums) jan (vocals, bass)
- Past members: Kiyoshi Takakuwa (vocals, bass)
- Website: great3.com

Great 3, stylised as GREAT3, are a Japanese rock band formed in 1994. The trio is composed of guitarist Akito Katayose, drummer Kenichi Shirane and bassist jan (who replaced Kiyoshi Takakuwa in 2012). All members serve as composers and lyricists, as well as lead vocalists. The band's name is a reference to all three members being tall.

== Biography ==
Katayose, Shirane and Takakuwa formed Great 3 after the dissolution of their previous band Rotten Hats (ロッテンハッツ, Rotten Hattsu) in February 1994 (the other members went to form Hicksville). The group debuted on Toshiba EMI with the single "Fool & the Gang" and the album Richmondo High in 1995. Later, they established their own label, Bodicious. In the early 2000s, they started collaborating with American musician John McEntire, who produced/engineered their albums May and December (2001), When You Were a Beauty (2002) and Climax (2003), When You Were a Beauty being recorded with the members of The Sea and Cake, Tortoise and Wilco. In February 2004, the group gone on hiatus, with members focusing on their solo careers. In May 2012, it was announced Kiyoshi Takakuwa was no longer part of Great 3. On 27 July 2012 they released their first digital single titled "Emotion / Lady" and on 1 August, it was announced the new bass player would be jan. The band's first album with jan, the self-titled Great3, was released on 21 November 2012. A second, entitled Ai no Kankei, was released on 19 March 2014; it is the band's most-recent release to date.

== Members ==
- Akito Katayose (片寄 明人, Katayose Akito) (born 23 May 1968 in Tokyo, Japan) — vocals, guitar

Known for writing lyrics, composing songs and producing records for Japanese acts such as Any, Fujifabric, GO!GO!7188, Merengue, Sakura Merry Men, Sister Jet, Sophia, Violent Is Savanna, Zamagi, et al.
In 2000, he released a solo album under the name Akito titled Hey Mister Girl! recorded with the members of The Sea and Cake, Tortoise and Wilco, and produced by John McEntire. Acts as a duo with his wife, Chocolat (Chocolat & Akito).

- Kenichi Shirane (白根 賢一, Shirane Kenichi) (born 11 January 1968 in Tokyo, Japan) — vocals, drums

Support live and studio drummer for various Japanese artists such as The Beatniks, Bonnie Pink, Caravan, Chara, CureaL, Leo Imai, Kimonos, Love Psychedelico, Yūji Nakada (中田裕二, Nakada Yūji), Salyu. Music producer. Released a solo electronic album titled Manmancer in 2008. His other musical projects include Lasvegas and Acapulco.

- jan (born 4 May 1990) — vocals, bass

Son of singer and photographer Nanako Sato

- Kiyoshi Takakuwa (高桑 圭, Takakuwa Kiyoshi)(Former member) (born 17 September 1967 in Australia) — vocals, bass

Left in May 2012. Continues solo career as Curly Giraffe and act as a live and studio support for other musicians. Played in a band Honesty with Shigekazu Aida of El-Malo.

== Discography ==
=== Albums ===
- Richmondo High (1995)
- Metal Lunchbox (1996)
- Romance (1997)
- Without Onion (1998)
- May and December (2001)
- When You Were a Beauty (2002)
- Climax (2003)
- Live 2003.5–6.7.9 (2003)
- Great3 (2012)
- Ai no Kankei (2014)

=== Singles ===
- "Fool & the Gang" (1995)
- "Oh Baby" (1995)
- "Discoman" (1995)
- "Star Tours" (1996)
- "Little J no Nageki" (Little Jの嘆き) (1996)
- "Glass Roots" (1996)
- "Tamatsuki" (玉突き) (1997)
- "Caligula" (1998) (with Chara)
- "Soul Glow" (1998)
- "I.Y.O.B.S.O.S." (1999) (with cover of Madonna's "Like a Virgin" as B-side)
- "Quincy" (2001)
- "Ruby" (2001)
- "Climax E.P." (2003)
- "Great 3 Remixes" (2004)
- "Higan" (彼岸) (2012)
- "Emotion" / "Lady" (レイディ, Reidi) (2012)

=== Compilations ===
- Great 3 Singles 1994～2002 (2002)
- Music for Cosmetic (2002) (Collection of instrumental songs)
- Lost Virgin ～Great3 Best～ (2004) (Best & live)

=== Videos ===
- Great3 Singles 1994～2002 (2002)
- Tour Climax 2003.5.9 (2003)
- Private Lesson Tour Romance I In the Summer of 1997 (2008)
- Great3 Singles 1994～2002 (2008)

=== Other ===
- Border -A Tribute to Motoharu Sano- (1996)
- We Love Butchers (1999) (Bloodthirsty Butchers tribute album)
- The Beach Boys Best of Tribute (2004)
