= Denki Groove =

Japanese music group

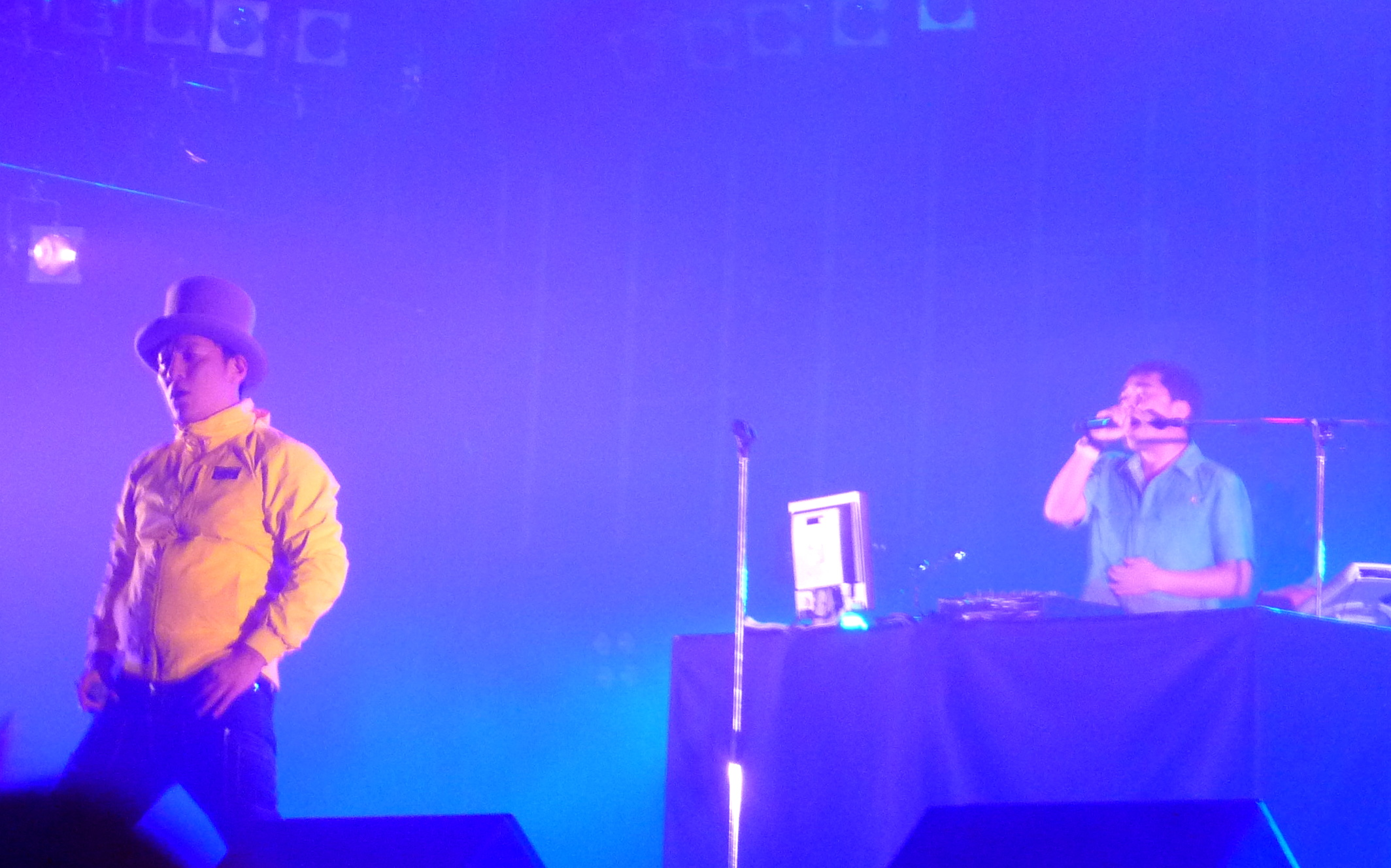
- Pierre Taki (left) and Takkyu Ishino (right) performing live in Japan, 2011

Background information
- Origin: Shizuoka, Shizuoka Prefecture, Japan
- Genres: Acid house; progressive house; trance; techno; big beat; J-pop; synth-pop; hip hop (early)
- Years active: 1989–2001; 2004–present
- Labels: SSE Communications; Trefort; Ki/oon Music
- Members: Takkyu Ishino; Pierre Taki
- Past members: Mimio; Koji Takahashi; Jun Kitagawa; Yoshinori Sunahara
- Website: www.denkigroove.com

Denki Groove (電気グルーヴ, Denki Gurūvu; "Electric Groove") is a Japanese music group founded in 1989. One of the foundational Japanese house and techno acts of the 1990s, it was founded by composer and singer Takkyu Ishino (who would then embark on a successful solo career as a techno DJ and producer) alongside singer and rapper Pierre Taki.

The strong absurdist sense of humor, a core part of their aesthetic that pervaded many of their compositions, along with the adoption of a stage name by every member, made them stand apart from similar Western electronic dance acts of the time such as 808 State, Underworld and The Chemical Brothers.

Songs by Denki Groove have been featured in Japanese commercials and in the soundtracks for popular anime shows, including Eureka Seven, Kuuchuu Buranko and Devilman Crybaby.

== History ==
Denki Groove was founded in 1989 by Fumitoshi "Takkyu" Ishino (occasionally credited as "TackQ Ishino" in the liner notes) and Masanori "Pierre" Taki, both of whom are natives of Shizuoka, Shizuoka Prefecture. Born from the ashes of ZIN-SÄY!, a new wave band, they formed on April 26, the same day their predecessor group disbanded.

Not long after the group's inception, they were joined by Yoshinori Sunahara, who was mononymously referred to as Marin (まりん) while in the band. Born as a hip-hop group, they famously transitioned to full-blown electronic dance music at around the time Sunahara joined, with their 1993 album Vitamin making acid house break into the Japanese musical mainstream, all while maintaining a sharp pop sensibility that made their music somewhat radio-friendly. With Sunahara, the trio recorded some of their most popular and critically acclaimed records, including A (pronounced "Ace"), their most commercially successful album to date, released in 1997.

The group's major-label debut studio album, Flash Papa, was released in 1991, the first being 662 BPM by DG in 1990. They have released several albums, including U.F.O. (1991), Karateka (1992), Vitamin (1993), Dragon (1994), Orange (1996), A (1997), which is their best selling record, and Voxxx (2000). Their 1997 single "Shangri-La", off the album A, has sold more than half a million copies.

Yoshinori Sunahara left in 1999, before the release of Voxxx, while remaining on amicable terms with the rest of the group. Upon releasing Voxxx, they went on a hiatus which lasted between 2001 and 2004.

In 2019, Pierre Taki was arrested on suspicion of cocaine possession. The scandal received media coverage even outside of Japan. In response, Sony Music Entertainment Japan took Denki Groove's recordings off the shelves and stopped streaming the group's music. Streaming services were resumed on June 19, 2020.

== Members ==
Current members

- Takkyū Ishino – vocals, production (1989–present)
- Pierre Taki – vocals, production (1989–present)

Former members

- Mimio – guitar (1989–1990)
- Koji Takahashi – production (1989–1990)
- Jun Kitagawa (CMJK) – production, turntables (1990–1991)
- Yoshinori Sunahara – production (1991–1999)

== Discography ==
=== Studio albums ===
- 662 BPM by DG (1990)
- Flash Papa (1991)
- U.F.O. (1991)
- Karateka (1992)
- Vitamin (1993)
- Dragon (1994)
- Orange (1996)
- A (1997)
- Voxxx (2000)
- Denki Groove toka Scha Dara Parr (2005) (with Scha Dara Parr)
- J-Pop (2008)
- Yellow (2008)
- 20 (2009)
- Human Beings and Animals (2013)
- Tropical Love (2017)
- 30 (2019)

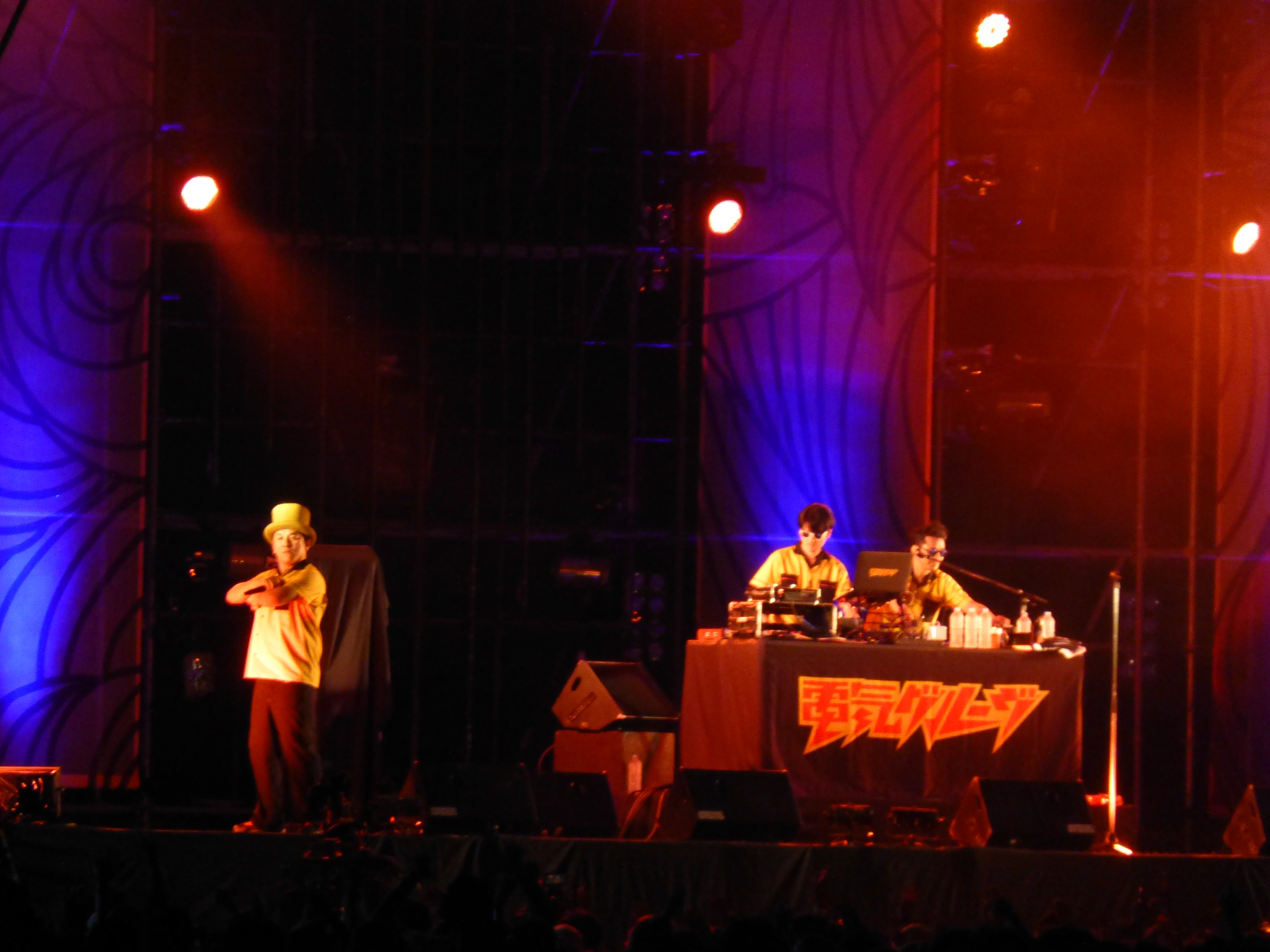
Denki Groove in Hokkaido in 2016

=== Compilation albums ===
- Flash Papa Menthol (1993)
- Drill King Anthology (1994)
- Recycled A (1998)
- The Last Supper (2001)
- Singles and Strikes (2004)
- Denki Groove Golden Hits: Due to Contract (2011)
- Denki Groove Decade 2008-2017 (2017)
- Tropical Love Lights (2017)

=== Live albums ===
- Ilbon 2000 (2000)

=== EPs ===
- Dragon EP (1995)
- Orange Remixes (1996)
- Hirake! Pon-chak (1996) (with Epaksa)
- Drill King Golden Hits Vol. 1 (2001)
- Drill King Golden Hits Vol. 2 (2001)
- Drill King Golden Hits Vol. 3 (2001)
- Dessert (2001)
- 25 (2014)

=== Singles ===
- "Rhythm Red Beat Black (Version 300000000000)" (1991) (split with TMN)
- "Mud Ebis" / "Cosmic Surfin'" (1991)
- "Snake Finger" (1992)
- "Transistor Radio" (1993) (as Simon'z)
- "N.O." (1994)
- "Popo" (1994)
- "Kame Life" (1994)
- "Zinsei (Hardfloor Remix)" (1994)
- "Niji" (1995)
- "Dareda!" (1996)
- "Asunaro Sunshine" (1997)
- "Shangri-La" (1997)
- "Pocket Cowboy" (1997)
- "Flashback Disco" (1999)
- "Nothing's Gonna Change" (1999)
- "Twilight" (2005) (with Scha Dara Parr)
- "Saint Ojisan" (2005) (with Scha Dara Parr)
- "Shonen Young" (2007)
- "Mononoke Dance" (2008)
- "The Words" (2009)
- "Upside Down" (2009)
- "Shameful" (2012)
- "Missing Beatz" (2013)
- "Fallin' Down" (2015)
- "Man Human" (2018)
- "Set you Free" (2020)
- "Homebase" (2022)
