= Ami Suzuki discography =

- Studio albums: 7
- Compilation albums: 5
- Singles: 29
- Video albums: 6
- Music videos: 34
- Promotional singles: 4
- Other appearances: 3

The discography of Japanese singer Ami Suzuki from 1998 to present.

== Albums ==
=== Studio albums ===
Title	Album details	Peak chart positions	Sales
Title	Album details	JPN	Sales
SA	Released: March 25, 1999; Label: True Kiss Disc (SMEJ); Formats: CD, MiniCD	1	JPN: 1,879,430
Infinity Eighteen Vol. 1	Released: February 2, 2000; Label: True Kiss Disc (SMEJ); Formats: CD	1	JPN: 1,062,990
Infinity Eighteen Vol. 2	Released: April 26, 2000; Label: True Kiss Disc (SMEJ); Formats: CD	2	JPN: 427,150
Around The World	Released: October 14, 2005; Label: Avex Trax; Formats: CD, CD+DVD	5	JPN: 62,022
Connetta	First collaboration album "Join"; Released: March 21, 2007; Label: Avex Trax; Formats: CD, CD+DVD	26	JPN: 11,505
Dolce	Second collaboration album "Join"; Released: February 6, 2008; Label: Avex Trax; Formats: CD, CD+DVD, vinyl	26	JPN: 10,835
Supreme Show	Tenth anniversary album; Released: November 12, 2008; Label: Avex Trax; Formats: CD, CD+DVD	16	JPN: 13,094

=== EPs ===
Title	Album details	Peak chart positions	Sales
Title	Album details	JPN	Sales
Snow Ring	Released: February 6, 2013; Label: Avex Trax; Formats: CD, CD+DVD	78	JPN: 1,881

=== Compilation albums ===
Title	Album details	Peak chart positions	Sales
Title	Album details	JPN	Sales
Fun for Fan	Compilation album; Released: May 30, 2001; Label: True Kiss Disc (SMEJ); Formats: CD	1	JPN: 379,290
Amix World	Remix album; Released: March 29, 2006; Label: Avex Trax; Formats: CD	83	JPN: 3,567
Blooming	Remix album; Released: July 21, 2010; Label: Avex Trax; Formats: CD	154	JPN: 837
Ami Selection	Compilation album; Released: December 7, 2011; Label: Avex Trax; Formats: CD, CD+DVD	43	JPN: 4,043
2SA: Ami Suzuki 25th Anniversary Box	Compilation album; Released: December 20, 2023; Label: Avex Infinity; Formats: CD, Blu-ray		

== Singles ==
Year	Title	Oricon chart peaks and sales				Album
Year	Title	Daily	Weekly	Debut	Overall	Album
1998	"Love the Island"	—	5	67,690	288,000	SA
1998	"Alone in My Room"	—	3	98,130	353,000	SA
1998	"All Night Long"	—	2	133,740	347,000	SA
1998	"White Key"	—	2	185,200	503,000	SA
1999	"Nothing Without You"	—	3	221,300	411,000	SA
1999	"Don't Leave Me Behind/Silent Stream"	—	3	198,790	273,000	SA
1999	"Be Together"	1	1	317,610	870,000	Infinity Eighteen Vol. 1
1999	"Our Days"	1	1	253,620	467,000	Infinity Eighteen Vol. 1
1999	"Happy New Millennium"	2	2	302,640	364,000	Infinity Eighteen Vol. 1
2000	"Don't Need to Say Good Bye"	—	5	272,620	346,000	Infinity Eighteen Vol. 1
2000	"Thank You 4 Every Day Every Body"	1	1	145,560	234,000	Infinity Eighteen Vol. 2
2000	"Reality/Dancin' in Hip-Hop"	—	3	142,260	211,000	Fun for Fan
2004	"Tsuyoi Kizuna"	^^	^^	^^	150,000	Non-album single
2004	"Forever Love"	—	22	10,016	17,000	Non-album single
2005	"Delightful"	2	3	41,936	97,000	Around the World
2005	"Eventful"	7	9	23,718	37,000	Around the World
2005	"Negaigoto"	9	13	13,997	22,000	Around the World
2005	"Around the World"	11	19	5,559	7,000	Around the World
2005	"Little Crystal"	8	22	10,194	16,000	Connetta
2006	"Fantastic"	8	14	14,167	20,000	Connetta
2006	"Alright!"	10	17	9,937	16,000	Connetta
2006	"Like a Love?"	13	23	8,765	13,000	Connetta
2007	"O.K. Funky God" (Ami Suzuki joins Buffalo Daughter)	19	47	3,066	4,000	Connetta
2007	"Peace Otodoke!!" (Ami Suzuki joins THC!!)	27	46	2,892	4,000	Connetta
2007	"Sore mo Kitto Shiawase" (Ami Suzuki joins Kirinji)	24	39	2,790	4,000	Connetta
2007	"Free Free/Super Music Maker" (Ami Suzuki joins Yasutaka Nakata)	16	32	5,660	9,000	Dolce
2007	"Potential Breakup Song" (Ami Suzuki joins Aly & AJ)	16	34	4,151	6,000	Dolce
2008	"One"	8	17	5,103	8,000	Supreme Show
2008	"Can't Stop the Disco"	27	17	4,655	6,000	Supreme Show
2009	"Reincarnation"	17	42	3,193	4,000	Ami Selection
2009	"Kiss Kiss Kiss"	16	25	2,448	3,000	Ami Selection

Footnotes:

- ^ = Still active in charts
- ^^ = No Rank
- — = N/A

=== Promotional singles ===
Year	Single	Album
2005	"Hopeful"	Around The World
2005	"For yourself"	Around The World
2005	"Happiness is..."	Non-album release
2011	"Love the Island (New Version)"	Ami Selection
"—" denotes items that did not chart or were not released.

== Other appearances ==
Song	Year	Album
"Zip-a-Dee-Doo-Dah"	2006	Disneymania presents Pop Parade Japan
"Beauty and the Beast" (美女と野獣)	2006	Disney's Fabdelight Christmas
"Can't Get You Out of My Head"	2010	Tokyo Girls Collection 10th Anniversary Runway Anthem
"Living In The Castle" (Phoenix 2:00 AM feat. Ami Suzuki)	2010	House Nation: 3rd Anniversary
"You Make A Magic" (Yummy feat. Ami Suzuki)	2010	D.I.S.K.

== Videography ==
=== Video albums ===
Year	Album details	Notes
2000	Amigo's Parlor Shake Shake Shake: Released: November 1, 2000; Label: Sony Music Entertainment Japan; Formats: DVD, VHS	Concert held in Nippon Budokan in 1999.
2000	Ami-Go-Round Tour: Released: December 23, 2000; Label: Sony Music Entertainment Japan; Formats: DVD, VHS	Concert held in Yokohama Arena in spring 2000.
2001	Video Clips Fun for Fan: Released: July 7, 2001; Label: Sony Music Entertainment Japan; Formats: DVD, VHS	Contains the music videos for Ami's first ten singles as lead artist
2004	2004 Summer Fly High: Ami Shower: Released: November 17, 2004; Label: Independent Release; Formats: DVD	Contains footage of concert held on August 8, 2004 at the Jingu Gaien Hanabi Taikai.
2006	Suzuki Ami Around the World: Live House Tour 2005: Released: February 8, 2006; Label: Avex Trax; Formats: DVD	Concert held in Zepp Nagoya on November 6, 2005.
2008	Join Clips: Released: February 6, 2008; Label: Avex Trax; Formats: DVD	Contains the music videos of the Join project.

=== Music videos ===
Year	Title	Director(s)
1998	"Love The Island"	Tetsuya Nakashima
1998	"Alone In My Room"	
1998	"All Night Long"	
1998	"White Key"	
1999	"Nothing Without You"	
1999	"Don't Leave Me Behind"	
1999	"Be Together"	
1999	"Our Days"	
1999	"Happy New Millennium"	
2000	"Don't Need To Say Good Bye"	
2000	"Thank You 4 Every Day Every Body"	
2000	"Reality"	Kouki Tange
2004	"Tsuyoi Kizuna"	
2004	"Forever Love"	
2005	"Delightful"	Hideaki Sunaga
2005	"Delightful" (Dance track)	Hideaki Sunaga
2005	"Hopeful"	Wataru Takeishi
2005	"Eventful"	Wataru Takeishi
2005	"Eventful" (Dance track)	Wataru Takeishi
2005	"Negaigoto"	Masashi Muto
2005	"Negaigoto" (Album edit)	Masashi Muto
2005	"For Yourself"	Ken Sueda
2005	"Around The World"	Shinichi Kudo
2005	"Crystal"	Ten Shimoyama
2005	"To Be Free˝	Takahide Ishii
2006	"Fantastic"	Tomoo Noda
2006	"Alright!"	Ryo Teshima
2006	"Like a Love?"	Ryo Teshima
2007	"O.K. Funky God" Ami Suzuki joins Buffalo Daughter	Kazuya Shiraishi
2007	"Peace Otodoke!!" Ami Suzuki joins THC!!	
2007	"Sore mo Kitto Shiawase" Ami Suzuki joins Kirinji	
2007	"Free Free" Ami Suzuki joins Yasutaka Nakata (Capsule)	Akihisa Takagi
2007	"Potential Breakup Song" Ami Suzuki joins Aly & AJ	Akihisa Takagi
2008	"Bitter..." Ami Suzuki joins S.A.	Akihisa Takagi
2008	"One"	Akihisa Takagi
2008	"Can't Stop The Disco"	Akihisa Takagi
2009	"Reincarnation"	Takuya Tada
2009	"Kiss Kiss Kiss"	Masaki Takehisa

== Others ==
- Bazooka 17 (Box Set released by Sony Music with all Ami's old releases), September 7, 2005
- A-Nation '05 Best Hit Live (including "Delightful"), October 26, 2005
- A-Nation '06 Best Hit Live (including "Alright!"), November 8, 2006
- A-Nation '07 Best Hit Live (including "Delightful"), November 7, 2007
- A-Nation '08 -Avex All Cast Special Live- (including "One"), November 26, 2008
- A-Nation '09 Best Hit Live (including "Delightful"), November 18, 2009
- A-Nation '10 Best Hit Live (including "Delightful"), November 24, 2010
