= Suzuki Ami Around the World: Live House Tour 2005 =

2005 live album by Ami Suzuki

- Tour by Ami Suzuki
- Associated album: Around the World
- Start date: October 21, 2005
- End date: November 6, 2005
- Legs: 1
- No. of shows: 3 in Japan

Ami Suzuki concert chronology
- 2004 Suzuki Ami: Ami's Love For You Live (2004); Suzuki Ami Around the World: Live House Tour 2005 (2005)

Suzuki Ami Around the World: Live House Tour 2005 was the live house tour held by Japanese pop singer Ami Suzuki that supported her debut studio album in Avex, Around The World.

== Background ==
It was Ami's first tour after joining the Avex trax label at the beginning of 2005. The term Live house of the tour eslogan is comparable to the English concept of music venue, in the sense of minor-scale concert tour, contrasting the ones held in big arenas. It was first announced in the period of release of Suzuki's third single in Avex "Negaigoto", with only three locations. At first, when the first album under her new label it was going to be Hopeful, the tour was meant to be called Suzuki Ami Hopeful 2005 Tour: Live House de Body Shake It, but after the album title was changed, so it was the name of the tour. Despite being a low-scale concert tour, Suzuki Ami Around the World: Live House Tour 2005 featured an interlude video shown in the beginning of the concert, and various changes of clothing. It even included virtual wings that appeared from Suzuki's back with feathers falling from all around the stage, while singing "Negaigoto", her song chosen to formally close the concert.

The concert main target was to promote her Avex material, and all the songs from the album were included in the set list, including also the b-sides that were not included in the album. However, Suzuki also performed some of her previous Avex songs, such as her 2004 indie single "Tsuyoi Kizuna", and two of her biggest hits from her Sony era in the encore.

== Set list ==
Original setlist
1. "Around The World"
2. "Beautiful"
3. "For yourself"
4. "I'm Alone"
5. "Risk"
6. "Sweet Voice"
7. "About You..."
8. "Tsuyoi Kizuna" (強いキズナ)
9. "Eventful"
10. "With You"
11. "Kagami" (鏡)
12. "Times"
13. "Hopeful"
14. "Delightful"
15. "Negaigoto" (ねがいごと)

Encore

1. "Be Together"
2. "All Night Long""
3. "Fantastic"

== Tour dates ==
Date	City	Country	Venue
October 21, 2005	Tokyo	Japan	Zepp Tokyo
October 23, 2005	Osaka	Japan	Namba Hatch
November 6, 2005	Nagoya	Japan	Zepp Nagoya

== DVD release ==
Suzuki Ami Around the World: Live House Tour 2005

Video by Ami Suzuki
- Released: February 8, 2006
- Recorded: November 2005: Zepp Nagoya
- Genre: J-pop, dance-pop
- Label: Avex Trax
- Producer: Max Matsuura

Ami Suzuki chronology
Summer Fly High: Ami Shower (2004)	Suzuki Ami Around the World: Live House Tour 2005 (2006)

=== Information ===
The DVD version of the concert was released on February 8, 2006, the same day as Suzuki's sixth single in Avex, "Fantastic". It included mainly footage from Zepp Nagoya. Only the Avex-licensed songs were included, with the exception of Suzuki's indie song "Tsuyoi Kizuna". There were also added some behind the scenes footage from the three locations as bonus material, including some live excerpts from the "Tsuyoi Kizuna" performance in Zepp Tokyo, where Ami couldn't sing some of the parts because she started crying on stage.

On its first day in the Oricon DVD charts, the tour peaked at 1st place, and at the end of the week it was placed at 7th.

=== Track listing ===
1. Around the World
2. Beautiful
3. For Yourself
4. I'm Alone
5. Risk
6. Sweet Voice
7. About You...
8. Tsuyoi Kizuna (強いキズナ)
9. Eventful
10. With You
11. Kagami (鏡)
12. Times
13. Hopeful
14. Delightful
15. Negaigoto (ねがいごと)
16. Fantastic
  - Bonus Material
17. Off-Shot
18. 2005.10.21 at Zepp Tokyo
19. 2005.10.23 at Nanba Hatch
20. 2005.11.06 at Zepp Nagoya

=== Charts ===
Oricon Sales Chart (Japan)

Release	Chart	Peak position	Sales total
February 8, 2005	Oricon Daily Music DVDs Chart	1	
February 8, 2005	Oricon Weekly Music DVDs Chart	7	4,397 copies sold
February 8, 2005	Oricon Monthly Music DVDs Chart		
February 8, 2005	Oricon Yearly Music DVDs Chart		
