= Ami Selection =

Greatest hits album by Ami Suzuki
- Released: December 7, 2011
- Recorded: 2005–2011
- Genre: J-pop, house, electropop
- Label: Avex Trax
- Producer: Max Matsuura

Ami Suzuki chronology
Blooming (2010)	Ami Selection (2011)	Snow Ring (2013)

Alternative covers

Singles from Ami Selection
- 1. "Reincarnation" Released: February 25, 2009; 2. "Kiss Kiss Kiss" Released: October 28, 2009; 3. "Love the Island (New Version)" Released: July 27, 2011

Ami Selection is the second compilation album by Japanese recording artist Ami Suzuki, and her first released on the Avex label. It was released on December 7, 2011.

== Album history ==
Despite being Ami's first greatest hits album on Avex, more than a half of the album consists of songs from the time when she was with Sony Music. For this album a total of 8 songs from Ami's Sony era were re-recorded with new vocals, including her debut single "Love the Island", and her first number one single, "Be Together". The newly recorded version of "Love the Island" was previously released on digital format, on July 27, 2011.

Singles that enjoyed moderate success, such as "Eventful", "Fantastic", "Like a Love?" or "One" didn't make to the final track listing.

The limited-edition version comes with a DVD that includes music videos and some songs that were performed live at the 29th Anniversary Live.

== Chart performance ==
The day it was released, the album peaked at nº 18 on the Oricon Daily charts. After the first week on sale the album reached nº 43 on the Oricon Weekly charts, selling 3,127 copies.

== Track listing ==
CD
No.	Title	Lyrics	Music	Arrangement	Length
1.	"Love the Island"	Tetsuya Komuro, Marc Panther	Tetsuya Komuro	Tetsuya Komuro	5:05
2.	"Alone In My Room"	Tetsuya Komuro, Marc Panther	Tetsuya Komuro	Tetsuya Komuro	4:55
3.	"All Night Long"	Tetsuya Komuro, Marc Panther	Tetsuya Komuro	Tetsuya Komuro	4:53
4.	"White Key"	Tetsuya Komuro, Marc Panther	Cozy Kubo, Tetsuya Komuro	Cozy Kubo, Tetsuya Komuro	4:44
5.	"Don't Leave Me Behind"	Marc Panther, Ami Suzuki	Tetsuya Komuro	Cozy Kubo, Tetsuya Komuro	4:40
6.	"Be Together"	Mistuko Komuro	Tetsuya Komuro	Tetsuya Komuro	3:44
7.	"Our Days"	Tetsuya Komuro, Mitsuko Komuro	Tetsuya Komuro	Cozy Kubo, Tetsuya Komuro	4:53
8.	"Don't Need to Say Good Bye"	Ami Suzuki, Tetsuya Komuro, Mitsuko Komuro	Tetsuya Komuro	Tetsuya Komuro	5:31
9.	"Tsuyoi Kizuna (強いキズナ, Strong Bond)"	Ami Suzuki	Kiichi Yokoyama		4:33
10.	"Delightful"	Ami Suzuki	Tohru Watanabe		4:17
11.	"Negaigoto (ねがいごと, Wish)"	Ami Suzuki	Daisuke Suzuki		5:06
12.	"Alright!"	Ami Suzuki	Kazunori Watanabe	HΛL	5:21
13.	"Free Free"	Yasutaka Nakata	Yasutaka Nakata	Yasutaka Nakata	5:15
14.	"Reincarnation"	Emi Hinouchi	Emi Hinouchi, Taku Takahashi	Taku Takahashi, Hisashi Nawata	5:35
15.	"Kiss Kiss Kiss"	Chris Brann, John Camp, Heather Johnson, Ami Suzuki	Chris Brann, John Camp, Heather Johnson		4:56

iTunes bonus track
No.	Title	Lyrics	Music	{{{extra_column}}}	Length
16.	"Future"	Leonn	Hirofumi Hibino	Tohru Watanabe	4:05

Limited edition DVD contents
No.	Title	Length
1.	"Delightful" (Music Clip)
2.	"Negaigoto" (Music Clip)
3.	"Alright!" (Music Clip)
4.	"Free Free" (Music Clip)
5.	"Reincarnation" (Music Clip)
6.	"Kiss Kiss Kiss" (Music Clip)
7.	"Be Together" (Live)
8.	"White Key" (Live)
9.	"Don't Leave Me Behind" (Live)
10.	"Nothing Without You" (Live)
11.	"Don't Need to Say Good Bye" (Live)
12.	"Special Clip: My First Part-Time Job at a Yakiniku Restaurant Project (焼き肉屋での人生初アルバイト企画映像)" (Bonus footage)

== Personnel ==
- Ami Suzuki - vocals
