= All Night Long (Ami Suzuki song) =

- CD artwork

Single by Ami Suzuki

from the album SA
- Released: November 5, 1998
- Recorded: 1998; (Japan)
- Genre: Drum and bass; pop
- Length: 4:58
- Label: Avex Entertainment Inc.; SMEJ Associated Records; Sony Music; True Kiss Disc
- Songwriters: Tetsuya Komuro; Marc Panther
- Producer: Komuro

Ami Suzuki singles chronology
"Alone in My Room" (1998)	"All Night Long" (1998)	"White Key" (1998)

"All Night Long" (stylized as "all night long") is a song recorded by Japanese singer Ami Suzuki for her debut studio album, SA (1999). It was written and produced by Japanese producer and songwriter Tetsuya Komuro. The track was released following Suzuki's two collaborative efforts with Komuro. "All Night Long" premiered on November 5, 1998, as the third single from the album.

Musically, the track was described as a drum and bass and pop song. Upon its release, "All Night Long" garnered positive reviews from music critics and was praised for its composition and production. It also achieved success in Japan; it was Suzuki's highest-charting single on the Japanese Oricon Singles Chart, until it was surpassed by "Be Together" (1999). The song has sold over 396,000 units in Japan, Suzuki's seventh best selling single in that region.

The accompanying music video for "All Night Long" was shot in Japan; it features Suzuki inside a club with friends, and running around an empty bowling alley. At the 1999 Japan Gold Disc Awards, "All Night Long" and Suzuki won the awards for the Gold Disc Prize and Best New Artist respectively. For additional promotion, the song featured on Suzuki's concert tours: 1st Concert Oh Yeah! 1999, Amigo's Parlor Shake Shake Shake, and Ami-Go-Round Tour amongst others. "All Night Long" was re-recorded and re-produced for Suzuki's second greatest hits album, Ami Selection (2011).

== Background and release ==
After the spontaneous success of Ami Suzuki's single's "Love the Island" and "Alone in My Room", Japanese producer and composer Tetsuya Komuro had written, produced, composed, and arranged Suzuki's next single "All Night Long". Like "Love the Island" and "Alone in My Room", Suzuki did not incorporate her last name and only used Ami as her stage name. Songwriter Marc Panther re-wrote portions of the track so it could include the English language. It was selected as the third single from SA, and was released on November 5, 1998, by True Kiss Disc, a sub-division of Japanese record label SMEJ Associated Records.

The maxi CD format of the single contains: the original composition, the Dave Ford remix under the title "Intensive Trip Remix", an extended version, and the instrumental version of the single mix. This is Suzuki's first maxi CD format to include an extended edit of any of her singles. The CD cover sleeve has a close-up shot of Suzuki looking into the camera. Suzuki is standing in front of a shiny blue circular backdrop, wearing a yellow collar shirt. The maxi CD was housed in a J-card-type 12 cm slimline single case. The case used was 7 mm thick, showing artwork through the front, and also through the spine and part of the back of the case. The CD itself was inserted upside-down, allowing the artwork on the disc itself to show through the transparent back of the case. The CD also included an obi that advertised Suzuki's previous two singles.

Following her blacklisting from the music industry in September 2000, production and distribution of the single stopped in its entirety.

== Composition ==
"All Night Long" was recorded in mid 1998 by Komuro in Tokyo, Japan. "All Night Long" was described as a drum and bass song with numerous musical elements, including pop music and Japanese pop. Throughout the choruses of the song, Suzuki's vocals are processed with minor vocoder effects. In December 2011, "All Night Long" was one of eight tracks from her compilation album Ami Selection to be re-produced, re-composed, and re-recorded. Komuro was in charge of re-produced, re-arranging, and re-composing the track; the re-worked track is a dance-pop song with the same elements of drum and bass and Japanese pop.

== Critical response ==
"All Night Long" received favorable reviews from most music critics. David Hickey, who had written her extended biography at AllMusic, highlighted the song as an album and career stand out track. A staff reviewer from CD Journal reviewed Suzuki's SA album, and complimented the album's singles as "mega-hits". Another staff reviewer from the same publication reviewed the single, and complimented Komuro's production and composition skills. The reviewer further praised his "new fusion" of drum and bass music with pop music, and labelled it "high quality" and the production "ambitious" and "innovative". Despite no review of the single, Steve McClure from Billboard used the single artwork on their article on December 8, 2001. Although the single was mentioned frequently with other of Suzuki's releases, the article was detailing about Suzuki's blackmailing and legal accusation and lawsuit between the years of 2000–2002. For the re-worked version, a staff reviewer from Japan's HMV commended the re-worked production. At the 1999 Japan Gold Disc Awards, "All Night Long" and Suzuki won the awards for the Gold Disc Prize and Best New Artist respectively.

== Commercial performance ==
"All Night Long" debuted at number two on the Japanese Oricon Singles Chart, which made it Suzuki's highest-charting single on that chart. Its first week sales were estimated at 133,740 units, which made it Suzuki's highest first week sales until it was surpassed by her following single "White Key". The song lasted sixteen weeks in the singles chart, Suzuki's first single to miss the twenty-week mark; this carried on with future singles onwards, whilst "Be Together" lasted seventeen weeks. "All Night Long" entered at number two on the Japanese Count Down TV Chart, Suzuki's highest-charting single and first top two at the time of November 14, 1998. It spent three weeks in the top ten and a total of fifteen weeks in the top 100. "All Night Long" was ranked at number 77 on their Annual Japanese Count Down TV chart, her second highest entry behind "Alone in My Room". Since its release, "All Night Long" has sold over 346,820 units in Japan. As of January 2016, Oricon's database has ranked "All Night Long" as Suzuki's fifth best-selling single.

== Music video ==
An accompanying music video for "All Night Long" was shot in Japan. The music video features Suzuki dancing in a club with several male and female friends in the background. Other scenes features Suzuki running in an empty bowling alley at night. During the choruses, it has Suzuki singing the song at the back of an alley, inside of the club, or in the middle of the bowling alley. The music video appeared on Suzuki's greatest videos compilation, Fun for Fan Video Clips (2001). The original mix appeared on Suzuki's greatest hits album Fun for Fan Video Clips (2001). The re-worked version was included on the track list of Suzuki's second greatest hits album, Ami Selection (2011).

== Promotion ==
"All Night Long" was used as a commercial song for the Japanese shoe company Kissmark. After Suzuki signed a deal with Sony Music and Kissmark not long after, Sony decided to re-promote the single in Japan, where it received significant attention in clubs. Her 1998–1999 releases emphasized Suzuki's "girl next door" personality in the media. "All Night Long" has appeared on majority of Suzuki's concert tours; these include her 1999 Oh Yeah! concert tour, her 2000 Parlor Shake Shake Shake concert tour, and her 2000 Ami-Go-Round Tour. "All Night Long" was included on the track list on one of Suzuki's concert tours; this being her 29th Anniversary Tour at the Liquidroom event, which was placed in the middle section for the concert. The live version appeared on the bonus DVD format of Suzuki's extended play, Snow Ring (2013).

== Track listings ==
- Japanese CD single
1. "All Night Long" (Single Mix) – 4:59
2. "All Night Long" (Intensive Trip Remix) – 5:54
3. "All Night Long" (Extended Mix) – 6:49
4. "All Night Long" (Instrumental) – 4:59
- Ami Selection re-recorded digital download
1. "All Night Long" (2011 mix) – 4:55

== Personnel ==
Credits adapted from the liner notes of SA.

- Ami Suzuki – vocals, background vocals
- Tetsuya Komuro – songwriting, composition, production, arrangement, management
- Marc Panther – songwriting
- True Kiss Disc – Suzuki's label
- SMEJ Associated Records – Suzuki's parent label
- Recorded by Komuro in Tokyo, Japan, 1998

== Charts and sales ==
=== Charts ===
Chart (1998–99)	Peak position
Japan Daily Singles Chart (Oricon)	1
Japan Weekly Singles Chart (Oricon)	2
Japan Yearly Singles Chart (Oricon)	98
Japan Weekly Count Down TV Singles Chart (TBS)	2
Japan Yearly Count Down TV Singles Chart (TBS)	77

=== Sales ===
Region	Certification	Certified units/sales
Japan (RIAJ)	None	346,820

== Release history ==
Region	Date	Format	Label
Japan	November 5, 1998	CD single	True Kiss Disc; SMEJ Associated Records; Sony Music
Japan	December 11, 2011	Digital download (2011 edit)	Avex Entertainment Inc.
Australia	December 11, 2011	Digital download (2011 edit)	Avex Entertainment Inc.
New Zealand	December 11, 2011	Digital download (2011 edit)	Avex Entertainment Inc.
United Kingdom	December 11, 2011	Digital download (2011 edit)	Avex Entertainment Inc.
Germany	December 11, 2011	Digital download (2011 edit)	Avex Entertainment Inc.
Ireland	December 11, 2011	Digital download (2011 edit)	Avex Entertainment Inc.
France	December 11, 2011	Digital download (2011 edit)	Avex Entertainment Inc.
Spain	December 11, 2011	Digital download (2011 edit)	Avex Entertainment Inc.
Taiwan	December 11, 2011	Digital download (2011 edit)	Avex Entertainment Inc.
