= Amix World =

Remix album by Ami Suzuki
- Released: 29 March 2006
- Recorded: 2006
- Genre: House, trance
- Length: 1:07:50
- Label: Avex Trax; AVCD-17937 (Japan, CD)
- Producer: Max Matsuura

Ami Suzuki chronology
Around the World (2005)	Amix World (2006)	Connetta (2007)

Amix World is the first remix album of Japanese singer Ami Suzuki, released in March 2006.

== Information ==
Amix World contains trance and house music mixes, including seven remixes of the song "Around the World", as well as remixes of the singles "Delightful", "Eventful" and "Negaigoto". The track collaborators included DJs Jonathan Peters, Ferry Corsten, and Space Cowboy.

The album was originally to only have songs from Suzuki's first album under Avex, Around the World, but it was later decided to add a remix of her single "Fantastic", which was released at the same time.

Amix World also marked the end of Suzuki's trance-influenced releases, her next singles described as following a more "mainstream" pop sound through the 2000s.

== Reception and chart performance ==
The album received little promotion, peaking at number 78 on the Oricon charts. A review by CD Journal described the album as "innovative" and complimented the variety of track interpretations: "Ami Suzuki's vocals cut through the vibrant beats refreshingly (...) This album is full of sounds that set the songs firmly apart from the original tracks".

== Track listing ==
All lyrics are written by Ami Suzuki.

CD
No.	Title	Remixer	Length
1.	"Around the World" (Sham-poo vs. Heavens Wire Remix)	Shohei Matsumoto	5:37
2.	"Hopeful" (M.O.R. Remix)	M.O.R.	4:04
3.	"Around the World" (Ferry Corsten Radio Mix)	Ferry Corsten	5:25
4.	"Delightful" (G.C.D. Mix)	Shouichiro Hirata	4:53
5.	"Around the World" (Jonathan Peters Club Mix)	Jonathan Peters	4:26
6.	"Eventful" (Bulldozzer Remix)	Bulldozzer	4:04
7.	"Around the World" (Space Cowboy 05)	Nicolas Dresti	3:12
8.	"Negaigoto (ねがいごと)" (Dub's the Wish Was Fulfilled Remix)	Dub Master X	5:05
9.	"Around the World" (Wall5 Remix)	Heigo Tani	5:33
10.	"Sweet Voice" (Clazziquai Project Remix)	Clazziquai Project	4:19
11.	"Around the World" (Dark Fazz Electro Mix)	Motonari Murakawa	4:45
12.	"I'm Alone" (Futon Dark Star Remix)	Futon, David Coker	5:59
13.	"Around the World" (Endroll Remix Ryo-G)	Ryo-G	6:01
14.	"Fantastic" (Ferry Corsten Radio Mix)	Ferry Corsten	4:27
Total length:			1:07:50

== Charts ==
Chart	Peak position	Sales	Time in chart
Oricon Weekly Albums	78	3,567 copies sold	2 weeks
