= Connetta =

Studio album by Ami Suzuki
- Released: 21 March 2007
- Recorded: 2005, 2006, 2007
- Genre: J-pop, soft rock, ballad, pop rock, experimental
- Length: 1:03:11
- Label: Avex Trax
- Producer: Max Matsuura

Ami Suzuki chronology
Amix World (2006)	Connetta (2007)	Dolce (2008)

Singles from Connetta
- 1. "Little Crystal" Released: 7 December 2005; 2. "Fantastic" Released: 8 February 2006; 3. "Alright!" Released: 17 May 2006; 4. "Like a Love?" Released: 26 July 2006; 5. "O.K. Funky God" Released: 28 February 2007; 6. "Peace Otodoke!!" Released: 7 March 2007; 7. "Sore mo Kitto Shiawase" Released: 14 March 2007

Connetta is the fifth studio album by Japanese singer and actress Ami Suzuki, released by the Avex Trax label. It is the first album released from the "Join" project of Suzuki, that consisted of collaborations with different artists and different genres.

== Background ==
Connetta was first album from the "Join" project of Suzuki, which consisted of collaborations with different artists and different musical genres. However, the first singles released were not originally part of the "Join" project, since this idea originally started at the beginning of 2007. Short time after the release of the first Avex album, Around The World, Suzuki introduced her then new song Fantastic at the encore of her 2005 live tour. The song was later released as a single in February 2006. "Crystal" and "To Be Free" were included in the Christmas single Little Crystal released in December 2005. The subsequent singles released in 2006, "Alright!" and "Like a Love?", were released as solo singles as well, though the later became noticed by the media mainly because it was the first musical composition made by Ai Otsuka for another artist besides herself. The first proper "Join" singles were "O.K. Funky God", "Peace Otodoke!!" and "Sore mo Kitto Shiawase", which were released between February 27 and March 14, 2007.

For the different collaborations Suzuki worked for the first time in her career with indie pop (Hideki Kaji, Ayano Tsuji), indie rock (Scoobie Do, Northern Bright) and experimental (Buffalo Daughter) artists, making this album the most risky in terms of music, as Connetta went a little farther from the regular J-Pop genre she used to sing through all her career.

== Track listing ==
CD
No.	Title	Lyrics	Music	Arrangement	Length
1.	"Aozora to Water (青空とWater)" (Ami Suzuki joins Hideki Kaji)	Hideki Kaji	Hideki Kaji	Hideki Kaji	4:18
2.	"Alright!" (Ami Suzuki joins HΛL)	Ami Suzuki	Kazunori Watanabe	HΛL	5:22
3.	"Peace Otodoke!! (Peaceお届け!!♡)" (Ami Suzuki joins THC!!)	Ami Suzuki, THC!!	THC!!	THC!!	4:18
4.	"Dancin' Little Woman" (Ami Suzuki joins Scoobie Do)	Taijiro Matsuki	Taijiro Matsuki	Scoobie Do	3:21
5.	"Hare Moyō (ハレもよう。)" (Ami Suzuki joins Ryutaro Kihara)	Ami Suzuki	Tetsuya Muramatsu	Ryutaro Kihara	5:00
6.	"To Be Free" (Ami Suzuki joins HΛL)	Ami Suzuki	Kazuhiro Hara	HΛL	5:30
7.	"Squall ni Nurete (スコールにぬれて)" (Ami Suzuki joins Kenji Ueda)	Ami Suzuki	Kei Yoshikawa	Kenji Ueda	4:43
8.	"Everything To Me" (Ami Suzuki joins Northern Bright)	Ami Suzuki	Hitoshi Arai	Northern Bright	4:30
9.	"O.K. Funky God" (Ami Suzuki joins Buffalo Daughter)	Ami Suzuki, Buffalo Daughter	Buffalo Daughter	Buffalo Daughter	3:52
10.	"Fantastic" (Ami Suzuki joins Ken Harada)	Ami Suzuki	Y@suo Ohtani	Ken Harada	4:39
11.	"Crystal" (Ami Suzuki joins Kazuhito Kikuchi)	Ami Suzuki	Kazuhito Kikuchi	Kazuhito Kikuchi	4:07
12.	"Sore mo Kitto Shiawase (それもきっとしあわせ)" (Ami Suzuki joins Kirinji)	Takaki Horigome	Yasuyuki Horigome	Kirinji	5:56
13.	"Like a Love?" (Ami Suzuki joins Ai Otsuka)	Ami Suzuki	Ai	Ai, Ikoman	4:11
14.	"Aishiteru Kitto (愛してる きっと)" (Ami Suzuki joins Ayano Tsuji)	Ami Suzuki, Ayano Tsuji	Ayano Tsuji	Ayano Tsuji	3:23
Total length:					01:03:11

DVD (A-Type)
No.	Title	Length
1.	"Original Short Drama: Join"
2.	"Making Movie: Behind The Scenes"
3.	"Single TV-Spot Collection"

DVD (B-Type)
No.	Title	Length
1.	"Birthday Live "Happy 25th Anniversary" @ Shibuya Duo Music Exchange" (Includes live footage of "Like a Love?", "Negaigoto", "Alright!" and "Delightful")
2.	"Making Movie: Behind The Scenes"
3.	"Single TV-Spot Collection"

== Singles ==
Date	Title	Peak position	Weeks	Sales
7 December 2005	"Little Crystal"	22	9	16,115
8 February 2006	"Fantastic"	14	5	20,213
17 May 2006	"Alright!"	17	6	16,200
26 July 2006	"Like a Love?"	23	4	12,980
28 February 2007	"O.K. Funky God"	47	1	3,699
7 March 2007	"Peace Otodoke!!"	46	1	3,614
14 March 2007	"Soremo kitto shiawase"	39	1	2,790

== Charts ==
Chart	Peak position	Sales	Time in chart
Oricon Weekly Albums	26	12,000+ copies sold	3+ weeks

== Short drama: Join ==
The "Join" project was not only related to music. A short story entitled "Join" was also made, written and directed by Kazuya Shiraishi, and starring Suzuki and Hiroyuki Onoue. Each one of the three "Join" CD singles "O.K. Funky God", "Peace Otodoke!!" and "Sore mo Kitto Shiawase" included the narration drama tracks "7 Days Before", "The Days Before" and "The Days After", which served as preludes for the 30-minute short film which was later included in the bonus DVD of the album (in the A Type version).

The short film tells the story of an art student (Ami) who is worried because she has not inspiration for drawing a new painting. Her classmate (Kōji, played by Onoue) invites her to help painting a mural for a senpai, and once she gets there and starts helping something begins to change within her.

Some of the musicians that collaborated in the Connetta album made cameo appearances in the short film, like the members of THC!!, MoOog Yamamoto from Buffalo Daughter, and Hitoshi Arai from Northern Bright. Arai even performed an acoustic version of "Everything To Me" in a scene.

=== Credits ===
- Ami Suzuki - Ami
- Hiroyuki Onoue： - Kōji
- Keisuke Horibe - Kamiki
- Ryu Morioka - Ryu
- Ayaka Komatsu - Yukako
- Narumi Konno - Haruka
- Kaohiko Kaoda - Yamadera
- Shiho Harumi - Kobayatsu

=== Personnel ===
- Director, Script: Kazuya Shiraishi
- Photography: Atsushi Fukumoto
- Illumination: Tokumitsu Ichikawa
- Art: Ryuji Noguchi
- Audio Recording: Takenori Misawa
- Stylist: Mie Egashira
- Hair & Make-up: Yuki Asano
- Assistant director: Kaoru Ogino
- Production Chief: Yuya Satoyoshi
- Line Producer: Hijiri Taguchi
- Associate Producer: Shinsuke Higuchi
