= Reincarnation (Ami Suzuki song) =

- DVD only artwork.

Single by Ami Suzuki

from the album Ami Selection
- B-side: "Dub-I-Dub"
- Released: February 25, 2009
- Recorded: 2008
- Genre: Club; Dance-pop
- Length: 5:36
- Label: Avex Entertainment Inc.; Avex Trax
- Songwriter: Emi Hinouchi
- Producer: Taku Takahashi

Ami Suzuki singles chronology
"Can't Stop the Disco" (2008)	"Reincarnation" (2009)	"Kiss Kiss Kiss" (2009)

"Reincarnation" is a song by Japanese recording artist Ami Suzuki for her second greatest hits album, Ami Selection (2011). It was written by Emi Hinouchi and produced by Taku Takahashi. It was Suzuki's first collaboration with both Hinouchi and Takahashi. It premiered on February 25, 2009, as the lead single from the album. The CD and digital cover sleeve has a close-up of Suzuki hovering a CGI bubble. The DVD cover sleeve features a slightly altered version of it.

It has been described as a dance and club song, with musical elements including electropop. Its lyrics celebrate Suzuki's career and music, and described elements of her day-to-day life. It received positive reviews, with praise for its composition and emotional lyrical delivery, and Suzuki's singing. It peaked at number 42 on the Japanese Oricon Singles Chart, with sales of somewhat over 4000 units there.

The music video for "Reincarnation" was shot in Japan. It features Suzuki at her home; walking the streets; and in several shots, floating in water. Suzuki performed the song in her 29th Anniversary tour at the Liquidroom event.

== Background and release ==
"Reincarnation" was written by Emi Hinouchi, and production, composing, and arrangement was handled by Japanese musician Taku Takahashi. It is Suzuki's first single to be handled by Takahashi, and her first song written by Hinouchi. However, "Reincarnation" is the only new track from Ami Selection that wasn't written by her; the following single "Kiss Kiss Kiss" was fully written by Suzuki. It was selected as the lead single from Ami Selection, and was released on February 25, 2009, by Avex Trax.

The Maxi CD format of the single contains: the original composition, the b-side track "Dub-I-Dub", the extended and instrumental version of "Reincarnation". The DVD format of the single includes the music video of "Reincarnation". "Dub-I-Dub" is a cover version originally performed by Danish group Me & My, and is Suzuki's first single cover since 2007's "Potential Breakup Song"; the latter was originally performed by American group Aly & AJ. The CD and digital cover sleeve has a close-up of Suzuki hovering a GCI bubble. The DVD cover sleeve features a slightly altered version of the former. The CD format was used as the digital EP cover for iTunes Store and Amazon.com.

== Composition ==
"Reincarnation" was recorded in late 2008 at Avex Studio in Tokyo, Japan. "Reincarnation" was described as a dance-pop song with numerous musical elements, including club music and electropop. Throughout the entire song, Suzuki's vocals are processed with autotune and vocoder post-production work. Tetsuo Hiraga from Hot Express noted the "super aggressive" progression of Suzuki's club music sound, and believed that the progression was due to her DJ work. A staff reviewer from CD Journal noted elements of electropop, and compared it to Hinouchi's work. The lyrics to "Reincarnation" describes Suzuki's celebration of her career and music; it also emphasizes slight themes of "day-to-day" life style.

== Reception ==
=== Critical responses ===
"Reincarnation" was well received by most music critics. Hiraga gave the song a very positive review; he complimented the song's composition by calling it "more than enough". He went on to commend Suzuki's vocals and praised the song writing for being "emotional". Furthermore, Hiraga concluded the review by labelling it an "anthem". A staff reviewer from CD Journal was positive towards the song, commending Takahashi's production; they labelled it a highly "welcomed" track with "Biyakana club sound". An editorial review on the Japanese Amazon.com site complimented the composition of the track, labelling it "club sound" that "opens new grounds" to Suzuki's future music.

=== Commercial performance ===
"Reincarnation" debuted at number 17 on the Japanese Oricon Daily Chart, and entered at number 41 on the Japanese Oricon Weekly Chart. The song sold over an estimated 3,000 units in its first week in Japan. (Note: Sales provided by Oricon database and are rounded to the nearest thousand copies.) This was Suzuki's lowest selling single in terms of first week sales, until it was surpassed by "Kiss Kiss Kiss" in 2010. However, it resulted in being her lowest charting single since her 2007 single "Peace Otodoke!!" at 46. The song lasted two weeks in the singles chart, her shortest spanning single to date. The song was her first single to miss the top 40, and her first single to sell under the 5,000 units with an estimated 4,000 units sold.

== Music video ==
The accompanying music video for "Reincarnation" was shot in Japan. The video opens with a glimpse of Suzuki walking in an underground, with flickering lights above her. As she spins around, the song opens with water bubbles circling her wrist. A cup of water spills on the ground, and Suzuki starts singing the song in her bed. As she gets up, several places of her room features water being thrown at different directions. Suzuki goes outside and witnesses the rain; some scenes features a reverse effect on the video, reverting to previous scenes. The chorus opens with Suzuki floating in colourful water, with several small and large bubbles circling her body.

The song's middle-bridge section has Suzuki and a black Labrador in an underground, lit up by colourful lights. As the song progresses, scenes of Suzuki's room moves around. Suzuki is walking through the room, interrupted by inter cut scenes of the room being moved around. Suzuki sings the song in her bed again, and in the underground. By the second verse, Suzuki starts to levitate in her bed and sings the song. The second chorus has Suzuki submerged and dancing in the water, while scenes of her underground has water bubbles surrounding her. After the chorus, Suzuki walks away from the underground and Suzuki's hand disappears from the water. The final scene has Suzuki open her door to her front yard. The music video appeared on the DVD formats of "Reincarnation" and Ami Selection, and was included as a bonus video on the Best of A-Nation 2009 compilation.

A second music video for "Reincarnation" was shot in Japan at the House Nation event. The event was hosted by Suzuki, but the song was not performed at the event. The music video was shot in both black and white, and in coloured, featuring Suzuki hosting and being the disc jockey of the event. Only a radio edit of the single was used in the video.

== Promotion and other usage ==
"Reincarnation" was performed at the 2009 A-Nation concert in Japan. The song was featured on the accompanying compilation of the concert, alongside the music video. The song was included on the track list of the compilation album House Nation Ruby. "Reincarnation" was performed at one of Suzuki's concert tours; this being her 29th Anniversary tour at the Liquidroom event. The 29th Anniversary tour was an annual celebration of her 29th birthday, and "Reincarnation" was performed in the middle section. The live version appeared on the bonus DVD format of Suzuki's extended play, Snow Ring (2013).

== Track listing ==
- Japanese CD single
1. "Reincarnation" – 5:36
2. "Dub-I-Dub" – 4:06
3. "Reincarnation" (Extended mix) – 7:11
4. "Reincarnation" (Instrumental) – 5:36
- Japanese CD and DVD single
1. "Reincarnation" – 5:36
2. "Dub-I-Dub" – 4:06
3. "Reincarnation" (Extended mix) – 7:11
4. "Reincarnation" (Instrumental) – 5:36
5. "Reincarnation" (music video)
- Digital EP
1. "Reincarnation" – 5:36
2. "Dub-I-Dub" – 4:06
3. "Reincarnation" (Extended mix) – 7:11
4. "Reincarnation" (Instrumental) – 5:36
- Digital Music Video download
1. "Reincarnation" (music video)

== Personnel ==
Credits adapted from the liner notes of Ami Selection.

- Ami Suzuki – vocals, background vocals
- Emi Hinouchi – songwriting, composition
- Taku Takahashi – composition, production, arrangement
- Avex Trax – Suzuki's management, Suzuki's label
- Avex Entertainment Inc. – Suzuki's management, Suzuki's label
- Recorded at Avex Studio, Tokyo, Japan

== Charts and sales ==
=== Daily and weekly charts ===
Chart (2008)	Peak position
Japan Daily (Oricon)	17
Japan Weekly (Oricon)	42

=== Sales ===
Region	Certification	Certified units/sales
Japan (RIAJ)	None	4,000

== Release history ==
Region	Date	Format	Label
Japan	February 25, 2009	CD single	Avex Trax
Japan	February 25, 2009	DVD single	Avex Trax
Japan	February 25, 2009	Digital EP	Avex Entertainment Inc.
Australia	February 25, 2009	Digital EP	Avex Entertainment Inc.
New Zealand	February 25, 2009	Digital EP	Avex Entertainment Inc.
United Kingdom	February 25, 2009	Digital EP	Avex Entertainment Inc.
Germany	February 25, 2009	Digital EP	Avex Entertainment Inc.
Ireland	February 25, 2009	Digital EP	Avex Entertainment Inc.
France	February 25, 2009	Digital EP	Avex Entertainment Inc.
Spain	February 25, 2009	Digital EP	Avex Entertainment Inc.
Taiwan	February 25, 2009	Digital EP	Avex Entertainment Inc.
