= Alone in My Room =

Alone in My Room may refer to:

- (Alone) In My Room", Verdelle Smith, 1966
- "Alone in My Room" (Ami Suzuki song), 1998
- "Alone in My Room" (Skin song), 2003
