= O.K. Funky God =

Single by Ami Suzuki joins Buffalo Daughter

from the album Connetta
- Released: 28 February 2007
- Recorded: 2007
- Genre: J-pop
- Length: 13:08
- Label: Avex Trax
- Songwriter(s): Ami Suzuki, Buffalo Daughter

Ami Suzuki joins Buffalo Daughter singles chronology
"Like a Love?" (2006)	"O.K. Funky God" (2007)	"Peace Otodoke!!" (2007)

"O.K. Funky God" is the ninth single released by Japanese singer Ami Suzuki under label Avex Trax. It was the first song released under the collaboration project "Join" of Suzuki, released along with Buffalo Daughter. It was released on 28 February 2007.

== Information ==
"O.K. Funky God" was the first of the three collaboration weekly single to be released from the "Join" Project. The single was limited to ten thousand copies. As bonus material it also includes a narration drama track from "Join", which was later turned into a short movie included in the DVD of album Connetta.

== Track listing ==
All lyrics are written by Ami Suzuki and Buffalo Daughter; all music is composed by Buffalo Daughter

CD
No.	Title	Length
1.	"O.K. Funky God"	3:55
2.	"O.K. Funky God (God Make Dub)"	3:51
3.	"Narration Drama "Join" #1: 7 Days Before"	6:07

== Charts ==
Oricon Sales Chart (Japan)

Release	Chart	Peak position	First week sales
28 February 2007	Oricon Weekly Singles Chart	47	3,699 copies
