= Nothing Without You (song) =

Single by Ami Suzuki

from the album SA
- Released: 17 February 1999 (JP)
- Genre: J-pop
- Label: Sony Music; AICT-1034 (Japan, CD)
- Songwriter(s): Marc, Tetsuya Komuro
- Producer(s): Tetsuya Komuro

Ami Suzuki singles chronology
| "White Key" (1998) | "Nothing Without You" (1999) | "Don't Leave Me Behind/Silent Stream" (1999) |

"Nothing Without You" is the fifth single released by Japanese singer Ami Suzuki in February 1999, the first Ami single released on that year.

== Information ==
The main song of this single also appeared in a TV commercial for a videogame from Tecmo called "Monster Farm 2", and was one of the 50 best-selling singles of that year. This was Ami's first single with only three songs on it since her debut single, "Love the Island". It peaked at number three on the Oricon singles chart.

Following her blacklisting from the music industry in September 2000, production and distribution of the single stopped in its entirety.

== Track listing ==
1. "Nothing Without You"
2. "Nothing Without You" (remix)
3. "Nothing Without You" (TV mix)
