= Forever Love =

Forever Love may refer to:

== Songs ==
- "Forever Love" (Alisa Mizuki song), 1997
- "Forever Love" (Ami Suzuki song), 2004
- "Forever Love" (Color Me Badd song), 1992
- "Forever Love" (Cute song), 2008
- "Forever Love" (Gary Barlow song), 1996
- "Forever Love" (Reba McEntire song), 1998
- "Forever Love" (TVXQ song), 2007
- "Forever Love" (X Japan song), 1996
- "Forever Love", by Taio Cruz from Rokstarr, 2009

== Films ==
- Forever Love (1998 film), an American television film directed by Michael Switzer
- Forever Love (2013 film), a Taiwanese film directed by Kitamura Toyoharu and Shao Li-shiou
- Forever Love (2014 film), a Chinese film directed by Zhao Yiran and Wei Jie
- Forever Love (2015 film), a Chinese film directed by An Zhanjun
- Backstreet Dreams (film), a 1990 American film released in the Philippines as Forever Love
- The Color of Time, a 2012 film released in the UK as Forever Love
