= Fantastic (song) =

Single by Ami Suzuki

from the album Connetta
- A-side: "Fantastic"
- B-side: Slow Motion (スローモーション)
- Released: 8 February 2006 (JP)
- Recorded: 2005
- Genre: J-pop, Trance
- Length: 19:40 (Regular edition); 9:20 (Limited edition)
- Label: Avex Trax; AVCD-30920/B (Japan, CD+DVD); AVCD-30921 (Japan, CD); AVCD-30922 (Japan, CD Ltd Ed)
- Songwriters: Ami Suzuki, Y@suo Ohtani
- Producer: Max Matsuura

Ami Suzuki singles chronology
| "Little Crystal" (2005) | "Fantastic" (2006) | "Alright!" (2006) |

Alternative cover
- CD-Only cover

"Fantastic" is the sixth single released by Japanese singer Ami Suzuki under Avex Trax released on 8 February 2006, in three formats, the two traditional CD and CD+DVD edition versions with the B-side track, and a Limited Edition version without the B-side track.

== Information ==
"Fantastic" is a trance-like song with a J-pop essence. The B-side, "Slow Motion", is a soft ballad tune.

"Fantastic" was used as the opening for the anime television series Blackjack, being the first song by Suzuki which appeared on an anime. Taking this step in her career, Avex expected to get more attention to Suzuki by anime fans, and so did Suzuki herself, and even more after the decrease of her single sales. In the interview at Oricon Style, Suzuki said she hoped the song will have more success because the anime fans.

The single was Suzuki's biggest success in six months. It did well on the charts, debuting at number nine in its first day, but then it fell off the charts in a few days. Although "Fantastic" debuted with her highest sales since "Negaigoto", it still wasn't as successful as "Delightful" and "Eventful".

== Track listing ==
All lyrics are written by Ami Suzuki.

CD single (CD Only, CD+DVD)
| No. | Title | Music | Arrangement | Length |
|---|---|---|---|---|
| 1. | "Fantastic" | Y@suo Ohtani | Ken Harada | 4:40 |
| 2. | "Slow Motion (スローモーション)" | Kei Yoshikawa | Keiji Tanabe | 5:09 |
| 3. | "Fantastic (Instrumental)" | | | 4:40 |
| 4. | "Slow Motion (スローモーション) (Instrumental)" | | | 5:08 |

DVD
| No. | Title | Length |
|---|---|---|
| 1. | "Fantastic (Music Clip)" |

CD single (Limited edition single)
| No. | Title | Music | Arrangement | Length |
|---|---|---|---|---|
| 1. | "Fantastic" | Y@suo Ohtani | Ken Harada | 4:40 |
| 2. | "Fantastic (Instrumental)" | | | 4:40 |

== Personnel ==
- Ami Suzuki – vocals, backing vocals
- Hidetake Yamamoto – acoustic guitar (#2)

== Production ==
- Producer – Max Matsuura
- Mixing – Naoki Yamada (#1), Yasuo Matsumoto (#2)

== Live performances ==
- 3 February 2006 — Music Fighter
- 9 February 2006 — Utaban
- 10 February 2006 — PopJam
- 18 February 2006 — Melodix

== Charts ==
Oricon Sales Chart (Japan)

| Release | Chart | Peak position | First week sales | Sales total |
|---|---|---|---|---|
| February 8, 2005 | Oricon Daily Singles Chart | 8 | 14,167 copies sold | 20,213 copies sold |
| February 8, 2005 | Oricon Weekly Singles Chart | 14 | 14,167 copies sold | 20,213 copies sold |

== See also ==
- Fantastic Ami Interview at Oricon (In Japanese)
- Fantastic Information at Oricon
