= Thank You 4 Every Day Every Body =

Single by Ami Suzuki

from the album Infinity Eighteen Vol.2
- B-side: "I Really Wanna Tell"
- Released: 12 April 2000 (JP)
- Recorded: ?
- Genre: J-pop
- Label: Sony Music; AICT-1222 (Japan, CD)
- Songwriter(s): Komuro, Maeda, Suzuki
- Producer(s): Tetsuya Komuro

Ami Suzuki singles chronology
"Don't Need to Say Good Bye" (2000)	"Thank You 4 Every Day Every Body" (2000)	"Reality/Dancin' in Hip-Hop" (2000)

"Thank You 4 Every Day Every Body" is a song by Ami Suzuki, released as her eleventh single under Sony Music Japan.

== Information ==
It was the first and only single from Ami's third studio album, Infinity Eighteen Vol.2, and debuted at number one on the singles charts from Oricon. It contains a B-side plus two remixes. The song was used as the main theme in a Kodak TV commercial called "Snap Kids", and the B-side, titled "I really wanna tell", was used in a Kanebo TV commercial called "Professional Style Shampoo".

After she was blacklisted from the music industry, production and distribution of the single stopped in its entirety.

== Track listing ==
1. Thank You 4 Every Day Every Body
  Produced by Tetsuya Komuro
  Mixed by Mike Butler
2. I Really Wanna Tell
  Featuring Cue Zero
3. Thank You 4 Every Day Every Body (Club Collapse Remix)
  Remixed by Mike Butler
  Remix Co-Produced by Thorsten Laewe
4. I Really Wanna Tell (Confession Remix)
  Featuring Cue Zero
  Remixed by Mike Butler
  Remix Co-Produced by Thorsten Laewe
