= Like a Love? =

Single by Ami Suzuki

from the album Connetta
- Released: 26 July 2006
- Genre: J-pop
- Length: 4:29
- Label: Avex Trax
- Songwriter: Ami Suzuki
- Producer: Max Matsuura

Ami Suzuki singles chronology
"Alright!" (2006)	"Like a Love?" (2006)	"O.K. Funky God" (2007)

"Like a Love?" is the eighth single released by Japanese singer Ami Suzuki under label Avex Trax. It was released in July 2006.

== Information ==
On June 28, 2006, it was announced that "Like a Love?" would be composed by Ai Otsuka. The lyrics were written by Suzuki, using the theme of "a first love in summer". CD Journal described the track as a "mid-tempo number with a touch of sadness", complimenting Otsuka's "adorable" melody and Suzuki's storytelling. The music video featured Suzuki in Okinawa, and utilized handshot footage emulating a couple on a date.

The track was used as the ending theme for the NTV drama Miracle☆Shape (ミラクル☆シェイプ). It reached a peak position of thirteen on the Oricon Daily Singles Chart.

"Like a Love?" was later included on the live DVD of Suzuki's 2011 release Snow Ring, as a part of her 29th Anniversary Live at LiquidRoom concert setlist.

== Track listing ==
All lyrics are written by Ami Suzuki.

CD (CD Only, CD+DVD)
No.	Title	Music	Arrangement	Length
1.	"Like a Love?"	Ai	Ai, Ikoman	4:13
2.	"Squall ni Nurete (スコールにぬれて)"	Kei Yoshikawa	Kenji Ueda	4:47
3.	"Like a Love? (Instrumental)"			4:12
4.	"Squall ni Nurete (スコールにぬれて) (Instrumental)"			4:47

DVD
No.	Title	Length
1.	"Like a Love? (Music Clip)"

== Live performances ==
- 23 July 2006 – Music Express
- 28 July 2006 – Music Fighter
- 8 August 2006 - Pop Jam Deluxe Natsu Uta '06
- 10 August 2006 - Utaban

== Charts ==
Oricon Sales Chart (Japan)

Release	Chart	Peak position	First week sales	Sales total
26 July 2006	Oricon Daily Singles Chart	13	8,765 copies	12,980 copies
26 July 2006	Oricon Weekly Singles Chart	23	8,765 copies	12,980 copies
