= Happy New Millennium =

Single by Ami Suzuki

from the album Infinity Eighteen Vol. 1
- B-side: "Rain of Tears, Winter Buzz"
- Released: 22 December 1999 (JP)
- Recorded: 1999
- Genre: J-pop
- Length: 26:20
- Label: Sony Music; AICT-1190 (Japan, CD)
- Songwriter(s): Suzuki, Takahiro Maeda, T. Komuro
- Producer(s): Tetsuya Komuro

Ami Suzuki singles chronology
"Our Days" (1999)	"Happy New Millennium" (1999)	"Don't Need to Say Good Bye" (2000)

"Happy New Millennium" is a song by Ami Suzuki, released as her ninth single under Sony Music Japan. The Maxi Single also included two B-sides with the finished "Rain of Tears" track. The single peaked at number two on the Oricon singles chart.

== Information ==
Released in 1999, the song described the end of the 1000s and the beginning of the 2000s. However, after Suzuki was blacklisted from the music industry in September 2000, production and distribution of the single stopped in its entirety.

== Track listing ==
1. Happy New Millennium
2. Rain of Tears
3. Winter Buzz
4. Happy New Millennium: TV Mix
