= New Rock (album) =

Studio album by Buffalo Daughter
- Released: March 10, 1998
- Recorded: 1997
- Genres: Pop rock, electronica
- Label: Grand Royal

Buffalo Daughter chronology
Socks, Drugs and Rock 'n' Roll (1997)	New Rock (1998)	WXBD (1999)

Singles from New Rock
- 1. "Great Five Lakes" Released: 1999

New Rock is the third album by the Japanese band Buffalo Daughter, released on March 10, 1998. The first single was "Great Five Lakes", which samples Neil Hamburger. The band supported the album with a North American tour that included a stint opening for Girls Against Boys.

== Production ==
The title of the album reflected Buffalo Daughter's desire to mix drum and bass and techno with the traditional rock instruments of guitar, drums, and bass. They cited Devo as a primary influence. "Airport Rock" samples a voice announcing airport protocols and rules. "Socks, Drugs, and Rock 'n' Roll" is about the desire to live a healthy lifestyle while on tour. "What's the Trouble with My Silver Turkey?" refers to the band's love of semi-trailer trucks.

== Critical reception ==
Professional ratings
Review scores
Source	Rating
AllMusic	4/5 stars
Robert Christgau	(dud)
The Great Indie Discography	6/10
Los Angeles Times	3.5/4 stars
Pitchfork	7.8/10
Rolling Stone	4/5 stars

Newsday said that Buffalo Daughter creates "some of the best sample-heavy pop since Beck burped up Odelay". Rolling Stone stated, "Buffalo Daughter have a gift for willful innocence: No matter how much Americana they consume and recycle—be it Seventies funk, Sixties TV commercials or Eighties oldschool rap". The Chicago Tribune opined that the "sound is a skittish collision of naive pop, minimalist electronica and whimsical nonsense that can be charming, numbing or simply vexing."

The Washington Post concluded that "like a lot of contemporary art-hop, Buffalo Daughter's music can sometimes be hopelessly diffuse... Still, at its best, the threesome crafts global-village grooves that are both rhythmic and rapturous." The Los Angeles Times noted that New Rock is "all over the map, but it coheres surprisingly well, primarily because Buffalo Daughter has both the wit and the chops to pull it all off with panache." The Rocket stated that the band "toss off jangly and sharp guitar riffs within their locked-up rhythmic frameworks."

== Remix ==
In an interview with the Japanese pop fanzine Kheer, the American musician Matt Mahaffey stated that he "loved" the music, and praised the band on their lyricism. Mahaffey's band Self later produced a remix of "Socks, Drugs, and Rock 'n' Roll", which aired on Morning Becomes Eclectic on September 16, 1998.

== Track listing ==
No.	Title	Length
1.	"New Rock"	5:10
2.	"R&B (Rhythm and Basement)"	4:27
3.	"Great Five Lakes"	5:40
4.	"What's the Trouble with My Silver Turkey?"	0:27
5.	"Autobacs"	6:20
6.	"Socks, Drugs, and Rock 'n' Roll"	3:13
7.	"Airport Rock"	0:40
8.	"Super Blooper"	8:34
9.	"Sad Guitar"	3:48
10.	"No Tokyo"	1:19
11.	"No New Rock"	2:39
12.	"Sky High"	5:32
13.	"Down Sea"	0:25
14.	"Jellyfish Blues"	3:17
Total length:		48:38

== Personnel ==
Credits adapted from the album's liner notes.

- SuGar Yoshinaga – lead vocals, guitar, synthesizer, design
- Yumiko Ohno – backing vocals, bass
- Moog Yamamoto – backing vocals, turntable, design
- Chika Ogawa – drums
- Kinichi Motegi – drums
- Atsushi Matsushita – drums
- Dora – engineer, recording
- ZAK – engineer
- Mel Sumita – photography
- Mariko Yamamoto – design
