= Blooming (album) =

Remix album by DJ Ami Suzuki
- Released: July 21, 2010
- Genres: House, electronica
- Label: Avex Trax
- Producer: Max Matsuura

DJ Ami Suzuki chronology
Supreme Show (2009)	Blooming (2010)	Ami Selection (2011)

Blooming is the first compilation album by Ami Suzuki as a disc jockey, released on July 21, 2010. Blooming is the first mixtape album by Ami Suzuki under the name "DJ Ami Suzuki".

The album includes songs that Suzuki plays in her DJ sets since 2009 in a non-stop format, including various popular house songs by several overseas artists, and songs from Japanese artists as well, specially those related to Avex's "House Nation" movement. The English version of "Kiss Kiss Kiss" was the only song performed by Suzuki that was included in the album.

== Track listing ==
No.	Title	Writer(s)	Performer	Length
1.	"Fade (Avicii 2009 Remix)" (feat. Kimblee)		Solu Music	5:16
2.	"I Gotta Feeling (House Nation Sunset In Ibiza Remix)"		Orangez	4:29
3.	"Put Your Hands Up For Detroit (Extended Mix)" (feat. King Gordy & Bizarre of D12)		Fedde Le Grand	3:31
4.	"Bonkers"		Dizzee Rascal	4:03
5.	"Out Of The Blue 2010 (Laidback Luke Mix)"		System F
6.	"Rock U" (feat. Namie Amuro)		Ravex	4:09
7.	"Cheap Thrills (Vocal Club Mix)"	feat. Plastic Little	Hervé	3:22
8.	"I Rave U (DJ 4th Remix)"		Ravex	3:10
9.	"Jager Meister"		Jager Meisters	3:13
10.	"Show Me Love (Safari Mix)" (feat. Robin S.)		Mobin Masters	5:21
11.	"Viva la Vida (House Nation Mix)"		DJ OMKT	4:47
12.	"Natural High (Dave Boynes Remix)" (feat. Inaya Day)		Michael Woods	5:41
13.	"One More Time (Mitomi Tokoto Big Summer Remix)"		Sunset In Ibiza	5:58
14.	"Kiss Kiss Kiss (Extended English Version)"		Ami Suzuki	6:21
15.	"Wonderful" (feat. Jonathan Mendelsohn)		World Sketch	6:20

== Personnel ==
- Art Direction, Design – Masaru Yoshikawa
- Mixing – DJ Ami Suzuki
- Mastering – Rena Koyanagi
