= Amigo's Parlor Shake Shake Shake =

Video by Ami Suzuki
- Released: November 1, 2000
- Genre: J-pop
- Label: Sony Japan

Amigo's Parlor Shake Shake Shake was the first live-recorded concert of Ami Suzuki. It was released by Sony Music Entertainment Japan in VHS and DVD formats.

== Track listing ==
1. Love the Island
2. Be Together
3. White Key
4. Silent Stream
5. Nothing Without You
6. Alone in My Room
7. All Night Long
8. Don't Leave Me Behind
9. Our Days
10. Happy New Millennium
11. Don't Need to Say Good Bye
12. Thank You 4 Every Day Every Body
13. I Really Wanna Tell/Multiple Angle Function (8 tunes)
