= Hopeful (Ami Suzuki song) =

Promotional single by Ami Suzuki

from the album Around the World
- Released: February 9, 2005
- Genre: J-pop, dance-pop
- Length: 4:35 (Original version); 4:53 (Remix version)
- Label: Avex trax
- Songwriter(s): Ami Suzuki, Shunsuke Yazaki

"Hopeful" is a song by Japanese recording artist Ami Suzuki, taken from her fourth studio album (and first in Avex) Around the World. The up-tempo, dance-pop song was written by Ami Suzuki (lyrics) and Shunsuke Yazaki (music).

== Background ==
The original version of the song, arranged by its composer Shunsuke Yazaki, was first introduced in commercial spots announcing Ami's comeback to music in the Avex Trax label. It was set to be digitally released on February 9, 2005 (Suzuki's birthday), through Japanese music download sites such as Mu-Mo and Mora. Later, the song was remixed by Japanese DJ and trance producer Overhead Champion, and this one became the lead version, being used in the music video for "Hopeful". This version was included in Suzuki's Avex first single "Delightful", and also in the Around the World album. Thus, the original version of "Hopeful" was never released physically, though it was included in some promotional CD singles with the cover showing Ami holding the Avex logo in her hands prior to the release of "Delightful".

Initially, it was "Hopeful" the song chosen to give name to Suzuki's first studio album in Avex. However, for unknown reasons, the album title ended up being Around the World instead of Hopeful.

== Music video ==
The music video was directed by Wataru Takeishi. It shows Suzuki sleeping over some highly-technological machine, that keeps her floating in a room that is apparently closed from everyone. A girl makes an appearance then, she enters this room and insert a CD into the machine where Suzuki is floating and sleeping. When the CD starts to be read, the machine activates and Suzuki awakes slowly. Her sleep and consequent awakening in the video most likely refers to her absence and subsequent comeback in the major music industry. The music video has three different scenarios, each one in bright red, yellow and gray colors. The red one is where Ami is with her hair down and in a white dress, seen floating, first sleeping and then awake. In the yellow scenes Ami appears in a white suit and a futuristic hairstyle, being surrounded by some machines. The gray scenario shows Ami with a business suit slightly modified, doing a choreography with a dance crew.

First, a short version of the video was included in the DVD of the "Eventful" single. The full version was included in the DVD of the album Around the World.

== Track listing ==
Digital download/Promotional CD
No.	Title	Lyrics	Music & Arrangement	Length
1.	"Hopeful"	Ami Suzuki	Shunsuke Yazaki	4:35
