= Don't Leave Me Behind / Silent Stream =

"Don't Leave Me Behind/Silent Stream"

Single by Ami Suzuki

from the album SA
- Released: March 1999 (JP)
- Recorded: 1999
- Genre: J-pop
- Length: 4:43
- Label: Sony Music; AICT-1048 (Japan, CD)
- Songwriter(s): Don't Leave Me Behind: Marc & Ami, Tetsuya Komuro; Silent Stream: Marc, Cozy Cubo
- Producer(s): Tetsuya Komuro

Ami Suzuki singles chronology
"Nothing Without You" (1999)	"Don't Leave Me Behind/Silent Stream" (1999)	"Be Together" (1999)

"Don't Leave Me Behind/Silent Stream" is the sixth single released by Japanese singer Ami Suzuki in March 1999. It was also the first double A-side single of the artist. The single reached number three in Japan.

== Information ==
For promoting the single and increase sales, the song "Don't leave me behind" was used on a TV commercial for the Japanese extension of Kodak on the Spring Campaign, and another song of the single, "Silent Stream" was used on a TV commercial for the juice drink, Bireley's.

After Suzuki was blacklisted from the music industry in September 2000, production and distribution of the single stopped in its entirety.

== Track listing ==
1. Don't Leave Me Behind
  Written by Marc & Ami
  Composed by Tetsuya Komuro
  Arranged by Cozy Kubo & TK
2. Silent Stream
  Written by Marc
  Composed & Arranged by Cozy Cubo
3. Don't Leave Me Behind (TV mix)
4. Silent Stream (TV mix)
