= Forever Love (Ami Suzuki song) =

Single by Ami Suzuki
- B-side: "Chain Love"
- Released: 11 August 2004 (JP)
- Recorded: 2004
- Genre: J-pop
- Label: Amity; AMICD-0001 (Japan, CD)
- Songwriter(s): Ami Suzuki

Ami Suzuki singles chronology
"Tsuyoi Kizuna" (2004)	"Forever Love" (2004)	"Hopeful" (2005)

"Forever Love" is the fourteenth single released by Japanese singer Ami Suzuki in August 2004. This single was her first and only single released by her independent label Amity. It included a B-side called "Chain Love" and the two songs from the single are J-pop tunes. The single performed relatively well, despite poor promotion for it, peaking at #21 on the Oricon Singles Chart, and #1 on the Oricon Independent Singles Chart.

== Track listing ==
1. Forever Love
2. Chain Love
3. Forever Love (Back Track)
4. Chain Love (Back Track)
