= Fun for Fan =

Greatest hits album by Ami Suzuki
- Released: 30 May 2001
- Genre: J-Pop
- Length: 68:29
- Label: Sony Music/TRUE KiSS DiSC; AICT-1320 (Japan, CD)
- Producer: Tetsuya Komuro

Ami Suzuki chronology
| Infinity Eighteen Vol.2 (2000) | Fun for Fan (2001) | Around the World (2005) |

Singles from Fun for Fan
- 1. "Reality/Dancin' in Hip-Hop" Released: 27 September 2000

Fun for Fan is the first best of album released by the Sony Music label for Japanese singer Ami Suzuki on May 30, 2001.

== Information ==
Released during the time of legal disputes with her manager, the album still managed to reach the #1 spot on the Oricon charts. The song "Love the Island"—which was originally released as her debut single in 1998—was used to promote the album's release. Later, on July 1, 2001, the album was also released on DVD and VHS under the title Video Clips FUN for FAN.

All the songs were the productions of Tetsuya Komuro. The album contains songs from the single "Reality/Dancin' in Hip-Hop".

Soon after her re-debut under Avex Trax in 2005, the album was re-released as part of her Bazooka 17 box set.

== Track listing ==
=== CD ===
1. "Love the Island"
2. "Alone in My Room"
3. "All Night Long"
4. "White Key"
5. "Nothing Without You"
6. "Don't Leave Me Behind"
7. "Silent Stream"
8. "Be Together"
9. "Our Days"
10. "Happy Millennium"
11. "Don't Need to Say Goodbye"
12. "Thank You 4 Every Day Every Body"
13. "Reality"
14. "Dancin' in Hip-Hop"
