= Infinity Eighteen Vol.2 =

Studio album by Ami Suzuki
- Released: 26 April 2000
- Recorded: 2000
- Genre: J-Pop, R&B
- Label: True Kiss Disc
- Producer: Tetsuya Komuro

Ami Suzuki chronology
Infinity Eighteen Vol. 1 (2000)	Infinity Eighteen Vol.2 (2000)	Fun for Fan (2001)

Singles from Infinity Eighteen Vol.2
- 1. "Thank You 4 Every Day Every Body" Released: 12 April 2000

Infinity Eighteen Vol.2 is the 3rd studio album of Japanese singer Ami Suzuki. The album held #1 on the Oricon charts and has sold a total of 427,000 copies to date. It also featured Ami's third #1 single "Thank You 4 Every Day Every Body", plus 11 additional tracks.

== Information ==
Some time after the album was released, Ami faced legal problems with her management company, AG Communications, when the company's president, Eiji Yamada, was convicted of tax evasion. As a result of President Yamada's conviction, Sony put the album out of print along with all other Ami Suzuki singles and albums released up to that point, and she was blacklisted from the J-pop music scene. However, after she re-debuted under Avex Trax in 2005, the album was re-released later that same year as part of her Bazooka 17 box set.

== Track listing ==
All music is composed by Tetsuya Komuro (joint work were noted)

CD
No.	Title	Lyrics	Music	Length
1.	"Undo"			2:04
2.	"Let Me Talk About My History One More Time" (feat. Infamous Syndicate)	Takahiro Maeda		6:26
3.	"Infinity 18 Vol. 2"	Maeda		5:01
4.	"I Really Wanna Tell"	Tetsuya Komuro, Maeda, Cue Zero		4:38
5.	"Thank You 4 Every Day Every Body"	Komuro, Maeda, Suzuki		5:03
6.	"Good Night Mr. Guitar"	Maeda	Cozy Cubo	3:47
7.	"Drive Me Crazy"	Maeda		4:35
8.	"Down Beat"	Mitsuko Komuro	Kubo	4:01
9.	"Make a Move"	M. Komuro	Kubo	4:39
10.	"Please Stay Tuned" (feat. Infamous Syndicate)	Maeda		5:07
11.	"Step"	Maeda		4:12
12.	"Breakin' My Heart"			4:27

== Credits ==
- Arranged by [Backing Vocals] – Naoki Takao (tracks: 2, 3, 6 to 9), Yuko Kawai (tracks: 2 to 11)
- Directed By [Lead Vocals] – Yuko Kawai (tracks: 2 to 9)
- Engineer – Gareth Ashton (tracks: 3), Hidetsugu Matsuya (tracks: 6, 8 to 11), Kenji Konishi (tracks: 2 to 11), Matt Lawrence (tracks: 1, 11, 12), Mike Butler (tracks: 1 to 3, 7, 10 to 12), Takashi Okano (tracks: 3, 7), Toshihiro Wako (tracks: 4, 5, 7, 9, 11), Ish Gonzalez* (tracks: 2, 10)
- Executive producer – Shigeo Maruyama
- Mastered by – Koji Suzuki
- Mixed by – Mike Butler
- Producer – Tetsuya Komuro
- Programmed By – Akihisa Murakami (tracks: 1 to 5, 7, 10 to 12), Reiji Matsumoto (tracks: 6, 8, 9), Toshihide Iwasa (tracks: 4, 5)
- Rap - Rashawnna Guy, Lateefa Harland (tracks: 2 and 10)

== Singles ==
Date	Title	Peak position	Sales
12 April 2000	"Thank You 4 Every Day Every Body"	1	234,000
