= Sore mo Kitto Shiawase =

"Soremo kitto shiawase"

Single by Ami Suzuki

from the album Connetta
- Released: 14 March 2007
- Genre: J-pop
- Length: ?:??
- Label: Avex Trax
- Songwriter(s): Ami Suzuki joins Kirinji

Ami Suzuki singles chronology
"Peace Otodoke!!" (2007)	"Soremo kitto shiawase" (2007)	"Free Free/Super Music Maker" (2007)

"Soremo kitto shiawase" is the 11th single released by Japanese singer Ami Suzuki under label Avex Trax. It was released on 14 March 2007.

== Information ==
"Soremo kitto shiawase" would be the third of the three collaboration Weekly singles to be released. This will be the first time Ami has collaboration project with Kirinji.

"Soremo kitto shiawase" is a limited-release single.

== Track list ==
1. Soremo kitto shiawase
2. Soremo kitto shiawase: Basic Session Version
3. Narration Drama「join」3: The Days After

== Charts ==
Oricon Sales Chart (Japan)

Release	Chart	Peak position	First week sales
14 March 2007	Oricon Weekly Singles Chart	39	2,790 copies
