= Kiss Kiss Kiss (Ami Suzuki song) =

Single by Ami Suzuki

from the album Blooming and Ami Selection
- A-side: "Kiss Kiss Kiss"
- B-side: "Aishiteru..."
- Released: October 28, 2009
- Recorded: 2009
- Genre: J-pop, house, synthpop
- Length: 4:56
- Label: Avex Trax
- Songwriter(s): Ami Suzuki (Japanese lyrics); Chris Brann, John Camp, Heather Johnson
- Producer(s): Max Matsuura

Ami Suzuki singles chronology
"Reincarnation" (2009)	"Kiss Kiss Kiss" (2009)

Alternative cover
- CD-Only cover

"Kiss Kiss Kiss" is Japanese singer and actress Ami Suzuki's twenty-ninth single (sixteenth single in Avex) and it was released on October 28, 2009. At the time of the single release, Ami's official site, as well as other music sites considered this work to be a double A-side single along with "Aishiteru...", but the work itself, as well as Avex official site, mention only "Kiss Kiss Kiss" to be the A-side, and "Aishiteru..." to be the coupling track.

== Background ==
"Kiss Kiss Kiss" is originally a song performed by American group Ananda Project. Ami first recorded the English version of the song, which was included in the compilation "Aquamarine" for Avex's dance music project House Nation. Later on she wrote herself the lyrics for a Japanese version for it, and it became her 16th Avex single.

Initial information of this single said that it would be produced by House Nation collaborator Tomoyuki Nakata. At the end, this song, "Aishiteru...", became merely the coupling track of the single.

== Promotion ==
"Kiss Kiss Kiss" was used as the theme song for promotions of the Toyota X "202" model. In the music video of the song, Ami rides and sings next to one of this cars. She also did in a special DJ tour hosted by Toyota and House Nation, called X"202" presents house nation × Ami Suzuki Tour, in which she performed in several discos and nightclubs in Japan.

== Track listing ==
CD (CD+DVD and CD Only)
No.	Title	Length
1.	"Kiss Kiss Kiss"	4:58
2.	"Aishiteru..."	4:08
3.	"Kiss Kiss Kiss (Extended Japanese Version)"	6:55
4.	"Kiss Kiss Kiss (Extended English Version)"	6:55
5.	"Aishiteru... (Extended)"	5:07

DVD (CD+DVD)
No.	Title	Length
1.	"Kiss Kiss Kiss (Music clip)"

== Chart rankings ==
Charts	Peak position
Oricon Daily Chart	16
Oricon Weekly Chart	28

=== Reported sales and certifications ===
Chart	Amount
Oricon certified sales	2,949
