= Peace Otodoke!! =

Single by Ami Suzuki

from the album Connetta
- Released: 7 March 2007
- Genre: J-pop
- Label: Avex Trax
- Songwriter(s): Ami Suzuki joins THC!!

Ami Suzuki singles chronology
"O.K. Funky God" (2007)	"Peace Otodoke!!" (2007)	"Soremo kitto shiawase" (2007)

"Peace Otodoke!!" is the tenth single released by Japanese singer Ami Suzuki under label Avex Trax. It was released on 7 March 2007.

== Information ==
"Peace Otodoke!!" would be the second of the three collaboration Weekly single to be released. This will be the first time Ami has collaboration project with THC!!.

"Peace Otodoke!!" is a limited-release single.

== Track list ==
1. Peace Otodoke!!
2. Peace Otodoke!!: 夏の湘南キャンペーンセットver.
3. Narration Drama「join」#2: The Days Before

== Charts ==
Oricon Sales Chart (Japan)

Release	Chart	Peak position	First week sales
7 March 2007	Oricon Weekly Singles Chart	46	3,614 copies
