= White Key =

Single by Ami Suzuki

from the album SA
- B-side: "もうじき朝になるのに"
- Released: 16 December 1998 (JP)
- Recorded: 1998
- Genre: J-pop
- Length: ?:??
- Label: Sony Music; AICT-1034 (Japan, CD)
- Songwriter(s): Cozy Kubo, TK, Marc
- Producer(s): Tetsuya Komuro

Ami Suzuki singles chronology
| "All Night Long" (1998) | "White Key" (1998) | "Nothing Without You" (1999) |

"White Key" is the fourth single released by Japanese singer Ami Suzuki under music label Sony Music in December 1998.

== Information ==
The main song of the single was also used for the TV commercial of the Japanese product "Kissmark", in the same way that "all night long" was used before. The full single was produced by Tetsuya Komuro.

This was Amy’s second single that includes a b-side; the first was her debut single "love the island".

Following her blacklisting from the music industry in September 2000, production and distribution of the single stopped in its entirety.

== Track listing ==
1. White Key
  Composed by Cozy Kubo & TK
  Written by Marc & TK
  Produced by Tetsuya Komuro
2. White Key (Doze of Mix)
  Remixed by TK
3. Moujiki asa ni naru no ni (もうじき朝になるのに, Although it will soon be morning)
  Composed by Cozy Kubo & TK
  Written by Marc & TK
  Produced by Tetsuya Komuro
4. White Key (TV Mix)

== Charts ==
Oricon Sales Chart (Japan)

| Release | Chart | Peak position | Sales total |
|---|---|---|---|
| November 5, 1998 | Oricon Weekly Singles Chart | 2 | 503,000 copies sold |
| November 5, 1998 | Oricon Yearly Singles Chart | 42 | 503,000 copies sold |
