= SA (album) =

Studio album by Ami Suzuki
- Released: 25 March 1999
- Recorded: 1998
- Genre: J-pop
- Length: 58:11
- Labels: Sony; AICT-1050 (Japan, CD); AIYT 9002 (Japan, MiniDisc)
- Producer: Tetsuya Komuro

Ami Suzuki chronology
SA (1999)	infinity eighteen vol.1, (2000)

Singles from SA
- 1. "Love the Island" Released: 1 July 1998; 2. "Alone in My Room" Released: 17 September 1998; 3. "All Night Long" Released: 5 November 1998; 4. "White Key" Released: 16 December 1998; 5. "Nothing Without You" Released: 17 February 1999; 6. "Don't Leave Me Behind/Silent Stream" Released: 17 March 1999

SA is Ami Suzuki's debut album released under label Sony Music Japan on 25 March 1999.

== Background information ==
The album was released on March 25, 1999, through True Kiss Disc, former sub-label of Sony Music Japan dedicated exclusively to artists produced by Tetsuya Komuro. The album was then released on MiniDisc format on April 29, 1999. Its title comes from Suzuki's initials.

The album also received the "Pop Album of the Year" award at the 14th Japan Gold Disc Awards.

A digitally remastered version of the album was subsequently released on Blu-spec CD format on September 11, 2013, simultaneously with her second album Infinity Eighteen Vol. 1.

== Chart performance ==
The album topped the Oricon charts, sold over 2.5 million copies and achieved platinum status by the Recording Industry Association of Japan.

== Track listing ==
CD, MiniDisc
No.	Title	Lyrics	Music	Arrangement	Length
1.	"Nothing Without You"	Marc	Tetsuya Komuro	Komuro, Cozy Kubo	4:13
2.	"Stories Behind"	Marc, Ami Suzuki	Kubo	Kubo	2:00
3.	"Alone In My Room"	Komuro, Marc	Komuro	Komuro	5:00
4.	"White Key"	Marc, Komuro	Kubo, Komuro	Kubo, Komuro	3:46
5.	"Another World"	Marc	Kubo	Kubo	3:46
6.	"Love The Island"	Komuro, Marc	Komuro	Komuro	4:55
7.	"Don't Leave Me Behind"	Panther, Ami	Komuro	Kubo, Komuro	4:39
8.	"Boku no Shiawase (ボクのしあわせ)"	Takahiro Maeda	Kubo	Kubo	4:32
9.	"In My Diary..."	Marc	Kubo	Kubo	3:40
10.	"Asu, Atsuku, Motto, Tsuyoku (明日、あつく、もっと、つよく)"	Komuro, Hiroshi Hiruma	Komuro	Kubo	5:06
11.	"Private Sky"	Marc	Kubo	Kubo	3:41
12.	"All Night Long"	Komuro, Marc	Komuro	Komuro	4:50
13.	"Silent Stream"	Marc	Kubo	Kubo	5:18
14.	"...Smile"	Maeda	Kubo	Kubo	1:52

== Singles ==
Date	Title	Peak position	Sales
1 July 1998	"Love the Island"	5	288,000
17 September 1998	"Alone in My Room"	2	353,000
5 November 1998	"All Night Long"	2	346,820
16 December 1998	"White Key"	2	503,000
17 February 1999	"Nothing Without You"	3	411,000
17 March 1999	"Don't Leave Me Behind/Silent Stream"	3	273,000
