= J-card =

Paper card used in physical media

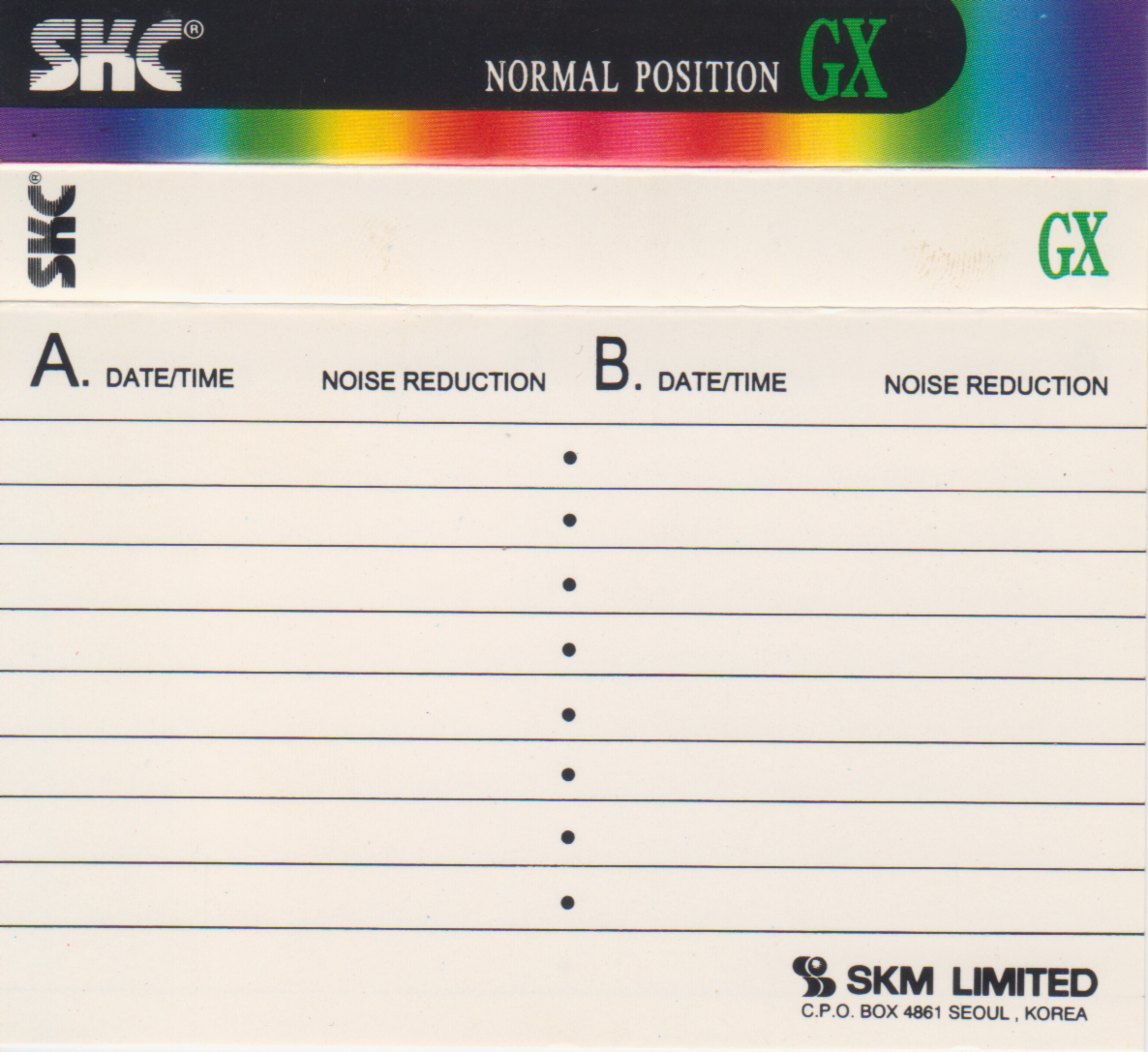
A J-card for a blank compact cassette

A J-card is the folded paper card inserted in the plastic storage case of most audio cassette releases, and of blank and home-recorded MiniDiscs, as well as being latterly wrapped around the outside of many Blu-ray and DVD steelbooks and similar special editions. The J-card usually contains an image of the album cover, a track listing, credits, and copyright information, with some releases having foldout cards with multiple panels to contain lyrics, liner notes, or additional artwork. Most J-cards contain the title of the content on the edge (the spine) for quick reference while in storage.

The J-card gets its name from being folded into the shape of the letter J (when viewed from the side) to fit inside the case: a large front panel, a narrow spine, and a short flap that turns in behind the media.

Today, custom made CD-R covers are often called J-cards. Similarly styled covers were used in CD covers in the 1990s for single cases and are still used today.

== Cassette J-cards ==
A cassette J-card in three-quarter view and end-on: the front panel, spine and rear flap fold into the shape of a letter J.

=== Dimensions ===
Cassette tape J-cards are 4 inches (101.6 mm) in height. The tracklisting flap is 1 1/16 inches (26.9875 mm). The title flap is 1/2 inches (12.7 mm). The front flap with album art is 2 9/16 inches (65.0875 mm). The other flaps are 1/16 inches (1.5875 mm) less than the one before. These J-cards can have 8 possible flaps.

=== Variants ===
The standard card has three panels (rear flap, spine and front) and measures roughly 4 by 4 1/8 inches (101.6 by 104.8 mm) unfolded. Fold-out cards add further panels to the right of the front, each about 1/16 inch narrower than the last so that the folded stack nests inside the front panel. Because the rear flap turns in and sits between the case and the cassette, some cards shorten it to a narrow tab, while others extend it to cover the whole back of the case, with slits cut to clear the case's hub posts.

Cards for blank tapes typically leave the tracklisting flap as ruled lines for handwriting, with the tape's brand and formulation on the front, as pictured above.

== MiniDisc J-cards ==
The MiniDisc cartridge measures 68 by 72 by 5 mm. Pre-recorded MiniDiscs were sold in a larger, CD-style jewel case with a rear tray inlay and a folded booklet, so those inserts are not J-cards. Blank and recordable discs, however, ship in a slimmer square case with a single clear front, and the insert for that case is a small J-card: 73 mm tall, with a 68 mm front panel, a 5.5 mm spine and an 11 mm rear tab, giving an unfolded card of about 84.5 by 73 mm. As with cassette cards, fold-out versions add panels of 66 mm and 64 mm behind the front so that the folded card still fits the case. Pre-printed blank-media cards carry the manufacturer's branding on the front and ruled lines for a handwritten track list on the inside; the spine is too narrow for more than a single line of small type.

== Other uses ==
The slim (5.2 mm) CD jewel case used for singles and CD-R media has no rear tray card, so its printed insert also wraps around the spine edge of the case with a narrow flap behind the disc, and is likewise called a J-card. Since the 2010s, retailer-exclusive Blu-ray and DVD steelbook editions have often shipped with a J-card wrapped around the outside of the metal case to carry the rating, barcode and marketing copy that the case itself cannot print.

== See also ==
- Obi (publishing)
- Optical disc packaging
- Compact Cassette
- MiniDisc
