= Snow Ring =

EP by Ami Suzuki
- Released: 6 February 2013
- Genre: J-pop
- Length: 36:00
- Label: Avex Trax

Ami Suzuki chronology
| Ami Selection (2011) | Snow Ring (2013) |

Snow Ring (2013) is an extended play by Japanese entertainer Ami Suzuki. It was released on 6 February 2013 via Avex Trax. In addition to the lead song "Snow Ring", the EP comprises new and previously unreleased material from Suzuki.

== Background ==
The mini album or EP was first announced in December 2012 initially in Suzuki's mobile fan club Ami Sapuri. "Snow Ring", the main song of the EP, is the first ballad song promoted as a single by Suzuki since 2007's "Sore mo Kitto Shiawase". The mini album includes many songs that were previously unreleased (in a regular album by Suzuki), such as "Future", included as a download-only bonus track for compilation album Ami Selection, and Kylie Minogue's cover of "Can't Get You Out of My Head", previously included in the compilation album Tokyo Girls Collection 10th Anniversary Runway Anthem. "Last Birthday" is a song from the Sony era that were previously performed live in concerts, and for the first time recorded in a studio version.

== Promotion ==
"Snow Ring" was used as theme song of an RPG videogame for smartphones developed by DropWave called Makina × Dolls, and it is also as theme song for TV commercials by Japanese real estate company Nissei Advance. Previously, "Future" also was used as theme song for Nissei commercials. This is the first release by Suzuki for which no promotional music videos were recorded.

== Track listing ==
CD
| No. | Title | Lyrics | Music | Arranger(s) | Length |
|---|---|---|---|---|---|
| 1. | "Snow Ring" | Ami Suzuki, Bounceback | Ats- | Ats- | 4:57 |
| 2. | "Shining" | Yoko Kuzuya | Kuzuya | Tohru Watanabe | 5:11 |
| 3. | "Last Birthday" | Ami Suzuki | Suzuki | Cozy Kubo | 5:18 |
| 4. | "Future" | Leonn | Hirofumi Hibino | Tohru Watanabe | 4:08 |
| 5. | "Can't Get You Out of My Head" | Cathy Dennis, Rob Davis | Dennis, Davis | N/A | 4:24 |
| 6. | "Snow Ring (Sunset in Ibiza Remix)" | Ami Suzuki, Bounceback | Ats- | Shohei Matsumoto | 6:09 |
| 7. | "Be Together (Shohei Matsumoto EDM Remix)" | Mitsuko Komuro | Tetsuya Komuro | Shohei Matsumoto | 6:15 |
