= Alone in My Room (Ami Suzuki song) =

Single by Ami Suzuki

from the album SA
- Released: 17 September 1998 (JP)
- Recorded: 1998
- Genre: J-pop
- Length: ?:??
- Label: Sony Music; AICT-1019 (Japan, CD)
- Songwriter(s): Marc Panther, Tetsuya Komuro
- Producer(s): Tetsuya Komuro

Ami Suzuki singles chronology
"Love the Island" (1998)	"Alone in My Room" (1998)	"All Night Long" (1998)

"Alone in My Room" is a song by Ami Suzuki, released as her second single in September 1998.

== Information ==
"Alone in My Room", like Ami's first single, "Love the Island", was used by the Japanese Government to promote winter tourism on the island of Guam. The song was also used multiple times as the opening theme of ASAYAN, a television show.

The complete single, including all its tracks, were creations of Ami's music mastermind in the Sony days, Tetsuya Komuro. Two of the remixes bear the initials T.K. because of this.

The single was the first one released by Ami in Maxi Single format, including more than three songs on it. The maxi CD was housed in a J-card-type 12 cm slimline single case. The case used was 7 mm thick, showing artwork through the front, and also through the spine and part of the back of the case. The CD itself was inserted upside-down, allowing the artwork on the disc itself to show through the transparent back of the case. The CD also included an obi that advertised Suzuki's previous single.

Following her blacklisting from the music industry in September 2000, production and distribution of the single stopped in its entirety.

== Track listing ==
1. Alone in My Room
2. Love the Island (TK ragga mix)
3. Alone in My Room (Club TK mix)
4. Alone in My Room (Instrumental)

== Charts ==
Oricon Sales Chart (Japan)

Release	Chart	Peak position	Sales total
September 17, 1998	Oricon Weekly Singles Chart	3	353,000 copies sold
