= Buffalo Daughter =

Japanese rock band

- Origin: Tokyo, Japan
- Genres: Indie pop, indie rock, experimental rock
- Years active: 1993–present
- Labels: Grand Royal, Emperor Norton, V2
- Members: suGar Yoshinaga; Yumiko Ohno; MoOoG Yamamoto
- Past members: Chica Ogawa
- Website: buffalodaughter.com

Buffalo Daughter is a Japanese rock band formed in 1993. The three main members are suGar Yoshinaga (ex-Havana Exotica) on guitar, Yumiko Ohno (ex-Havana Exotica) on bass, and Moog (later changed to MoOog) Yamamoto on turntables and graphic design. The group had a drummer, Chica Ogawa, but after her departure they have had no permanent drummer and have hired different people to fill in as needed. In addition, the band is well known for using a number of electronic instruments, such as the TB-303, TR-606, Minimoog, shortwave radio, and other instruments. Although they emerged from Shibuya at about the same time as other Shibuya-kei acts, Yoshinaga does not believe the label accurately describes the band's music.

== History ==
Buffalo Daughter is considered to be the linchpin of the so-called "cut-and-paste" rock Shibuya-kei movement from Japan. The band was created in the early 1990s when it was signed to independent Japanese label Cardinal. Seeking wider exposure, they continued under the Beastie Boys' now-defunct music label Grand Royal, bringing their discography up to a total of four full-length album releases, an EP, and a handful of remixes. The band's style, always a variety of different sounds and genres, evolved slowly but surely into a more cohesive and restrained melodic style. In 2002 Buffalo Daughter released their fifth album I in the United States on Los Angeles-based label Emperor Norton Records.

According to band member Ohno, "We call ourselves Buffalo Daughter because our sound is very strong. And the buffalo is strong." In a 1998 interview, the group explained that "Buffalo" projects a pleasing image of American culture and countryside and at the time of the group's original formation, all the members were girls, so "Daughter" was appropriate. Also, the sound of the name itself appealed to the group.

In 2006, Buffalo Daughter collaborated with pop singer Ami Suzuki. They released the single "O.K. Funky God" together on 28 February 2007, and it was later included on Suzuki's Connetta album.

In 2009, Buffalo Daughter performed the song "Galactic S-O-U-L" for the Katamari Forever soundtrack.

== Members ==
- suGar Yoshinaga (vocals, guitars, TB-303)
- Yumiko Ohno (vocals, bass, keyboards)
- Moog Yamamoto (vocals, turntables)

== Discography ==
Full-length albums

- Captain Vapour Athletes (1996) (a compilation of Shaggy Head Dressers and Amoebae Sound System)
- Jungle Park Original Soundtrack with Delaware (1997)
- New Rock (1998) [#77, Japan]
- I (2001)
- Pshychic (2003) [#68, Japan]
- Euphorica (2006) [#151, Japan]
- The Weapons of Math Destruction (2010) [#90, Japan]
- Konjac-tion (2014) [#150, Japan]
- We Are The Times (2021)

EPs

- Shaggy Head Dressers (1994)
- Amoebae Sound System (1995)
- Legend of the Yellow Buffalo (1995)
- Socks, Drugs and Rock and Roll (1997)
- A Long Life Story of Miss Cro-Magnon (2002)
- Continuous Stories of Miss Cro-magnon (20 Years Later) (2021)
