= Around the World (Ami Suzuki song) =

Single by Ami Suzuki

from the album Around the World
- Released: 12 October 2005 (JP)
- Recorded: 2005
- Genre: J-pop
- Length: 17:39
- Label: Avex Trax; AVCD-30852 (Japan, CD)
- Songwriters: Y@suo Ohtani, Ami Suzuki
- Producer: Max Matsuura

Ami Suzuki singles chronology
"Negaigoto" (2005)	"Around the World" (2005)	"Little Crystal" (2005)

"Around the World" is the fourth single released by Ami Suzuki under the record label, Avex Trax.

Unlike her previous three singles, "Around the World" is a special limited-edition single that only had 10,000 copies available for sale and only came in the CD format. It was released on the same day as her first album under Avex and also shared the same name. The single also contained a special photobook. As this single was not released in CD+DVD format, the music of "Around the World" was only available in the album.

The single includes a remixed version of the song "Times", a B-side originally included in the "Negaigoto" single. Both tracks are dance tunes.

== Track listing ==
All lyrics are written by Ami Suzuki.

CD single
No.	Title	Music	Arrangement	Length
1.	"Around The World"	Y@suo Ohtani	Ken Harada	4:38
2.	"Times (Dub's Pop Radio Edit Remix)"	Tohru Watanabe	Dub Master X	4:14
3.	"Around The World (Instrumental)"			4:38
4.	"Times (Dub's Pop Radio Edit Remix) (Instrumental)"			4:14

== Personnel ==
- Ami Suzuki - vocals, backing vocals

== Production ==
- Producer - Max Matsuura

== Live performances ==
- 14 October 2005 — Music Fighter
- 17 October 2005 — Hey!Hey!Hey! Music Champ
- 22 October 2005 — CD:TV
- 28 October 2005 — Music Station
- 28 October 2005 — PopJam
- 29 October 2005 — Melodix
- 17 December 2005 — Japan Cable Awards (Nihon Yusen Taisyo) 2005
- 31 December 2005 — 47th Japan Record Awards - "Eventful" and "Around the World"

== Charts ==
Oricon Sales Chart (Japan)

Release	Chart	Peak position	Sales total
12 October 2005	Oricon Daily Singles Chart	11	
12 October 2005	Oricon Weekly Singles Chart	19	7,500 copies sold
12 October 2005	Oricon Yearly Singles Chart	816	
