= Infinity Eighteen Vol. 1 =

Infinity Eighteen Vol.1

Studio album by Ami Suzuki
- Released: February 9, 2000
- Recorded: 1999–2000
- Genre: J-Pop
- Length: 56:25
- Label: True Kiss Disc
- Producer: Tetsuya Komuro

Ami Suzuki chronology
SA (1999)	Infinity Eighteen Vol.1 (2000)	Infinity Eighteen Vol.2 (2000)

Singles from Infinity Eighteen Vol.1
- 1. "Be Together" Released: 14 July 1999; 2. "Our Days" Released: 29 September 1999; 3. "Happy New Millennium" Released: 22 December 1999; 4. "Don't Need to Say Good Bye" Released: 26 January 2000

Infinity Eighteen Vol.1 is the second studio album of Japanese recording artist Ami Suzuki, released on February 9, 2000, through True Kiss Disc.

== Information ==
The album was released the same day of Suzuki's eighteenth birthday. The album was a commercial success in Japan, debuted at number one its first week on the Oricon charts, and selling over one million copies, her second best-selling album to date. The album charted for 14 weeks on the Japanese Oricon charts. All the singles released prior to the album were rearranged and were added vocoder effects on Suzuki's voice.

After a legal dispute between Suzuki and her manager in September 2000, Sony put the album out of print along with all other Ami Suzuki singles and albums released up to that point, and she was blacklisted from the J-pop music scene. However, after she re-debuted under Avex Trax in 2005, the album was re-released later that same year as part of her Bazooka 17 box set. It was later re-released in a remastered version on the Blu-spec CD 2 format on September 11, 2013, simultaneously with her debut album SA.

== Track listing ==
CD
No.	Title	Lyrics	Music	Arrangement	Length
1.	"Intro: Identification Track"		T. Komuro	T. Komuro	2:09
2.	"Infinity 18"	T. Komuro, Mitsuko Komuro	T. Komuro	T. Komuro	4:26
3.	"Be Together" (Shadow Dancing Mix)	M. Komuro	T. Komuro	T. Komuro	4:13
4.	"Don't Need to Say Good Bye"	Suzuki, M. Komuro, T. Komuro	T. Komuro	T. Komuro	5:33
5.	"Happy New Millennium" (2G Mix)	Suzuki, Takahiro Maeda	T. Komuro	Cozy Kubo, Chūken Kōbō	4:07
6.	"My Wish (If You Wanna Be With Me)"	Suzuki, T. Komuro	T. Komuro	T. Komuro	4:34
7.	"Our Days" (Orchestral Winter Mix)	M. Komuro, T. Komuro	T. Komuro	T. Komuro	4:50
8.	"Ashita no Watashi ni Ai ni Kite" (あしたの私に会いに来て; Going to See My Tomorrow Self)	M. Komuro	Naoto Kine	Kōbō	4:49
9.	"Winter Buzz"	Suzuki, Maeda	Cozy Kubo	Kubo, Chūken Kōbō	3:50
10.	"Night Sky"	Marc Panther	Kubo	Kubo	4:22
11.	"Evidence of Love"	Maeda	Kazuhiro Matsuo, T. Komuro	Matsuo, T. Komuro	5:45
12.	"Breakin' My Heart"	M. Komuro, T. Komuro	T. Komuro	T. Komuro	4:39
13.	"Outro (Vol. 2 Available in April)"		T. Komuro	T. Komuro	3:02

== Singles ==
Date	Title	Peak position	Sales
14 July 1999	"Be Together"	1	870,000
29 September 1999	"Our Days"	1	467,000
22 December 1999	"Happy New Millennium"	2	364,000
26 January 2000	"Don't Need to Say Good Bye"	5	346,000
