= Love the Island =

Single by Ami Suzuki

from the album SA
- A-side: "Love the Island"
- B-side: "Asu, Atsuku, Motto, Tsuyoku"
- Released: July 1, 1998
- Recorded: 1998
- Genre: J-pop, pop standards
- Length: 14:48
- Label: True Kiss Disc
- Songwriter(s): Tetsuya Komuro; Marc Panther
- Producer(s): Tetsuya Komuro

Ami Suzuki singles chronology
"Love the Island" (1998)	"Alone in My Room" (1998)

"Love the Island" is the debut single of Japanese singer Ami Suzuki released on July 1, 1998 through True Kiss Disc, sub-label of Sony Music Entertainment Japan owned by Tetsuya Komuro.

== Information ==
"Love the Island" was used in TV commercials for Japanese tourism in Guam. Ami starred those commercials. The single debuted at number 5 in the Oricon Weekly Charts, selling 288,000 copies.

This was the first and only single of Ami Suzuki to be released in a mini CD single format.

Following her blacklisting from the music industry in September 2000, production and distribution of the single stopped in its entirety.

On July 27, 2011, a newly recorded version was released online, and was later included in the greatest hits compilation Ami Selection.

== Track listing ==
All tracks are written by Tetsuya Komuro (along with artists noted).

No.	Title	Lyrics	Arrangement	Length
1.	"Love the Island"	Marc Panther		4:56
2.	"Asu, Atsuku, Motto, Tsuyoku (明日、あつく、もっと、つよく)"	Hiroshi Himura	Cozy Cubo	5:06
3.	"Love the Island (Instrumental)"			4:56

== Personnel ==
- Producer - Tetsuya Komuro
- Strings arrangement - Randy Waldman
- Mixing - Keith Cohen (#1), John Van Nest (#2)

== Charts ==
Oricon Sales Chart (Japan)

Release	Chart	Peak position	Sales total
July 1998	Oricon Weekly Singles Chart	5	288,000 copies sold
