= Our Days =

Single by Ami Suzuki

from the album Infinity Eighteen Vol. 1
- B-side: "Rain of Tears"
- Released: 29 September 1999 (JP)
- Genre: J-pop
- Length: 26:20
- Label: Sony Music; AICT-1137 (Japan, CD)
- Composer: Tetsuya Komuro
- Lyricists: Mitsuko Komuro and Tetsuya Komuro
- Producer: Tetsuya Komuro

"Our Days" is the 8th single released by Japanese singer Ami Suzuki under the label Sony Music Japan.

== Information ==
The song was a huge success at the time of its release, debuting at number one in the Oricon charts, and being also one of the best-selling singles of Suzuki. The song "Our Days" was her second single that was written by Mitsuko Komuro, and also was used as the main theme of "Professional Style", a home product made by Kanebo. The maxi single included a clip of "Rain of Tears", a song of Suzuki that appeared on a Kodak TV Commercial called "Snap Kids".

Following her blacklisting from the music industry in September 2000, production and distribution of the single stopped in its entirety.

== Track listing ==
All lyrics are written by Mitsuko Komuro and Tetsuya Komuro; all music is composed by Tetsuya Komuro.

CD single
No.	Title	Length
1.	"Our Days (Original Mix)"	4:55
2.	"Our Days (Serenity Mix)"	4:55
3.	"Our Days (TV Mix)"	4:55
4.	"Rain of Tears (CM Version)"	1:13
