= Eventful (song) =

Single by Ami Suzuki

from the album Around the World
- Released: 25 May 2005
- Recorded: 2005
- Genre: J-pop
- Length: 26:20
- Label: Avex Trax; AVCD-30713/B (Japan, CD+DVD); AVCD-30714 (Japan, CD)
- Songwriter: Ami Suzuki
- Producer: Max Matsuura

Ami Suzuki singles chronology
"Delightful" (2005)	"Eventful" (2005)	"Negaigoto" (2005)

"Eventful" is a song by Japanese recording artist Ami Suzuki, from her fourth studio album Around The World, first album under the Avex Trax label. Written by Suzuki and composed by Tohru Watanabe, it was released as her second single under the Avex label on May 25, 2005.

== Background ==
The song was first introduced and performed at the release party of her debut single "Delightful" in Velfarre on March 22 of the same year. Ami presented the song as "one that will start being available online in April (of that year)" A remix version from German trance group Bulldozer was released online on April 13, 2005.

The single was finally released on May 25 in two formats: CD+DVD and CD Only. Ballad song "Kagami" (鏡, Mirror) composed by Tomoya Kinoshita was included as the b-side of the single. Kinoshita also composed "About You...", b-side of the previous single "Delightful". Both versions of the single contain a different remix, one from 80key and other from Dub Master X. The previously released Bulldozer remix was not included in the single, but was later included in the remix album Amix World. The DVD included in the CD+DVD version includes the music video and behind the scenes footage of the "Eventful", as well as a short version of "Hopeful". The full version of this video would be later be included in DVD of the Around The World album.

At the end of 2005 "Eventful" was awarded in the 47th Japan Record Award with the gold prize.

== Music video ==
The music video shows Ami dressing a once-piece red motocross suit. In the first scenes of the video she is inside a sort of shop showcase as if she was a statue, and when the music beats start she begins an energetic choreography with her dancers. Two of the dancers in the video are members of J-Pop band AAA. In the next scene of the video Ami appears sitting a couch aside a lamp, and she goes to another room there, where she finds a modern motorbike. She puts a helmet on, gets onto the motorbike and drives out to the highway. In the final scenes of the video Ami gets off the motorbike and contemplates the sunrise of the morning after, as she sings the final parts of the song.

The Dance Clip version of the video included in the DVD of the Around The World album features only the scenes of the showcase of Ami along with the dancers.

== Track listing ==
CD single (CD+DVD)
No.	Title	Length
1.	"Eventful"	4:23
2.	"Kagami (鏡)"	4:19
3.	"Hopeful (M.O.R. Remix)"	4:04
4.	"Eventful (83key Daybreak Remix)"	4:30
5.	"Eventful (Instrumental)"	4:23
6.	"Kagami (鏡) (Instrumental)"	4:17

CD single (CD Only)
No.	Title	Length
1.	"Eventful"	4:23
2.	"Kagami (鏡)"	4:19
3.	"Hopeful (M.O.R. Remix)"	4:04
4.	"Eventful (Dub's Full of Drama Remix)"	4:32
5.	"Eventful (Instrumental)"	4:23
6.	"Kagami (鏡) (Instrumental)"	4:17

DVD
No.	Title	Length
1.	"Eventful (Music Clip)"
2.	"Hopeful (Music Clip - Short Version)"
3.	"Eventful (Making)"

Digital download
No.	Title	Length
1.	"Eventful (Bulldozer Remix)"	4:02

== Live performances ==
- 20 May 2005 — PopJam
- 23 May 2005 — Hey! Hey! Hey! Music Champ
- 27 May 2005 — Music Station
- 27 May 2005 — Music Fighter
- 28 May 2005 — Melodix
- 5 June 2005 — CDTV
- 31 December 2005 — 47th Japan Record Awards (a.k.a. Nihon Record Taishou) - "Eventful" and "Around the World"

== Charts ==
Oricon Sales Chart (Japan)

Release	Chart	Peak position	Debut sales	Sales total
May 25, 2005	Oricon Daily Singles Chart	6	23,718	36,660
May 25, 2005	Oricon Weekly Singles Chart	9	23,718	36,660
