= Around the World (Ami Suzuki album) =

Studio album by Ami Suzuki
- Released: 12 October 2005
- Recorded: 2004, 2005
- Genre: J-Pop
- Length: 54:17
- Label: Avex Trax
- Producer: Max Matsuura

Ami Suzuki chronology
Fun for Fan (2001)	Around the World (2005)	Amix World (2006)

Singles from Around the World
- 1. "Delightful" Released: 24 March 2005; 2. "Eventful" Released: 25 May 2005; 3. "Negaigoto" Released: 17 August 2005; 4. "Around the World" Released: 12 October 2005

Around the World is the fourth studio album by Japanese singer Ami Suzuki. It marked her first release under the Avex Trax label. Ami released a single by the same name on the same day.

== Information ==
The album title was originally set to be Hopeful, but was later changed to the current one. The styles of the album consists of upbeat J-Pop songs with touches from house and trance, also with some sweet pop ballads and soft songs. A single of the same-title song was released the same of the album. It was included the previously released singles "Delightful", "Eventful" and "Negaigoto", and also the digital releases "Hopeful" and "For yourself". However, the Trance remix version of "Hopeful" was included in the album -the same as the one used in the promotional video and included in the Delightful maxi single- instead of the original J-Pop version. This versions hasn't been included in any physical release at the moment.

A curious fact is that the DVD of the album doesn't include the original music videos of the songs of the previous physical singles; the dance tracks videos are the original songs but only with the dance scenes that Ami shot for those videos, and the album edit of "Negaigoto" is a slightly different edit of the original video.

== Sales ==
The album came in at #4 on its first day, but fell to #5 for the weekly charts. However, sales were lower than predicted. This record marked Ami Suzuki as a qualified and profitable female singer in the Japanese Music Industry.

Its first week AROUND THE WORLD sold approximately 30,000 copies. After various weeks in the charts, the album managed to sell more than 60,000 copies.

== Track listing ==
All lyrics are written by Ami Suzuki.

CD
No.	Title	Music	Arranger	Length
1.	"Around The World"	Yasuo Ōtani	Ken Harada	4:35
2.	"Hopeful" (Overhead Champion Mix)	Shunsuke Yazaki	Overhead Champion	4:53
3.	"Beautiful"	Daisuke Suzuki	Ats-	4:55
4.	"Sweet Voice"	Kazuhito Kikuchi	Yasunari Nakamura	4:46
5.	"Delightful"	Toru Watanabe	Axel Konard	4:19
6.	"For Yourself"	Watanabe	H-Wonder	4:42
7.	"Negaigoto (ねがいごと)"	D. Suzuki	Nakamura	5:05
8.	"Risk"	D. Suzuki	Nakamura	4:42
9.	"Eventful"	Watanabe	Watanabe	4:21
10.	"With You"	Kikuchi	Harada	4:46
11.	"Times"	Watanabe	Watanabe	4:13
12.	"I'm Alone"	Kikuchi	Kikuchi	2:56
Total length:				54:17

DVD
No.	Title	Length
1.	"Hopeful" (Video Clip)
2.	"Delightful" (Dance Track)
3.	"Eventful" (Dance Track)
4.	"Negaigoto (ねがいごと)" (Album Edit)
5.	"For Yourself" (Video Clip)
6.	"Around The World" (Video Clip)
7.	"For Yourself" (Making Clip)
8.	"Around The World" (Making Clip)

== Singles ==
Date	Title	Peak position	Weeks	Sales
24 March 2005	"Delightful"	3	12	97,218
25 May 2005	"Eventful"	7	5	22,096
17 August 2005	"Negaigoto"	13	6	22,000
12 October 2005	"Around the World"	19	3	7,500

== Personnel ==
- Ami Suzuki - vocals, backing vocals
- Yumi Kawamura - backing vocals

== Production ==
- Executive Producer - Max Matsuura
- Planner - Jun Harada
- Supervisors - Hiroshi "Funaty" Ishimori, Takashi Okuda
- Directors - Hatsukoshi Yasuhara, Aki Hori, Aya Noguchi
- A&R - Katsuhiko Sakurai, Shizuka Oruga, Hideaki Tamamuchi
- Desk A&R - Megumi Seyika, Nozomi Yasumune, Sakoto Sairenji
- Musical Director - Yoshihisa Tokuda
- Mixing - Naoki Yamada, Atsushi Hattori, Overhead Champion (#2), Axel Konard (#5)
- Recording - Kaoru Akimoto, Shuichi Watanabe, Masahiro Kawata, Atsushi Hattori, Kei Kusama
- 2nd Engineering - Masahiro Kawata, Ryuichi Okubo, Hanae Saito, Hitomi Suzuki, Makoto Yamadoi, Hideaki Jinbu, Ryo Watanabe, Tsuyoshi Yamada.

== Charts ==
Chart	Peak position	Sales	Time in chart
Oricon Weekly Albums	#5	62,022 copies sold	7 weeks
