= Delightful (Ami Suzuki song) =

Single by Ami Suzuki

from the album Around the World
- A-side: "Delightful"
- B-side: "About You..."
- Released: 24 March 2005
- Recorded: 2005
- Genre: J-pop, trance
- Length: 25:50 (CD+DVD version); 26:20 (CD Only version); 27:03 (CD+Photobook/Illustration Essay)
- Label: Avex Trax
- Songwriter(s): Ami Suzuki, Tohru Watanabe
- Producer(s): Axel Konrad

Ami Suzuki singles chronology
| "Hopeful" (2005) | "Delightful" (2005) | "Eventful" (2005) |

Alternative cover

"Delightful" is the first physical single released by Ami Suzuki under the label Avex Trax. It is commonly known as Suzuki's "comeback single", as it was five years since the release of her previous major work.

== Information ==
This single was Suzuki's first significant release her single, "Reality/Dancin' in Hip-Hop" in 2000, which reached No.3 on the Oricon weekly singles chart. "Delightful" was produced by German trance musician Axel Konrad, who gave it a marked eurodance influence. Since her return to a major record company, "Delightful", is her strongest selling single and has become Suzuki's signature song of her new era in the Avex company. Since its release, the song has become a crowd favourite, along with "Be Together", at her live performances in music festivals and public events, one of the most remarkable being the yearly Japan nationwide tour organized by Avex, A-Nation.

== Chart performance ==
The single debuted at number two in the Oricon daily charts. At the end of its first week, it had gotten the third spot, selling 41,936. After twelve weeks in the charts, "Delightful" ended up selling 97,218 copies, and was later placed at number 97 in Oricon's Yearly Top 500 best singles of 2005.

== Track listing ==
All lyrics are written by Ami Suzuki

CD (CD+DVD)
| No. | Title | Music | Arrangement | Length |
|---|---|---|---|---|
| 1. | "Delightful" | Tohru Watanabe | Axel Konrad | 4:19 |
| 2. | "About You..." | Tomoya Kinoshita | Reo Nishikawa | 4:20 |
| 3. | "Hopeful (Overhead Champion Remix)" | | | 4:53 |
| 4. | "Delightful (Dub's Re-Start Mix)" | | | 4:41 |
| 5. | "Delightful (Instrumental)" | | | 4:19 |
| 6. | "About You... (Instrumental)" | | | 4:18 |

DVD
| No. | Title | Length |
|---|---|---|
| 1. | "Delightful (Music Clip)" |
| 2. | "Special Interview" |
| 3. | "Off Shot" |

CD
| No. | Title | Length |
|---|---|---|
| 1. | "Delightful" | 4:19 |
| 2. | "About You..." | 4:20 |
| 3. | "Hopeful (Overhead Champion Remix)" | 4:53 |
| 4. | "Delightful (Remo-con Mix)" | 6:51 |
| 5. | "Delightful (Instrumental)" | 4:19 |
| 6. | "About You... (Instrumental)" | 4:18 |

CD+Photobook/CD+Illustration Essay
| No. | Title | Length |
|---|---|---|
| 1. | "Delightful" | 4:19 |
| 2. | "About You..." | 4:20 |
| 3. | "Hopeful (Overhead Champion Remix)" | 4:53 |
| 4. | "Delightful (G.C.D. Mix)" | 4:54 |
| 5. | "Delightful (Instrumental)" | 4:19 |
| 6. | "About You... (Instrumental)" | 4:18 |

== Live performances ==
- 11 March 2005 — Music Station
- 17 March 2005 — Utaban
- 19 March 2005 — Music Fair 21 - "Delightful" and "Love the Island"
- 25 March 2005 — Music Fighter
- 26 March 2005 — CDTV
- 1 April 2005 — PopJam
- 31 December 2005 - CDTV 2005-2006 Special
- 31 December 2005 — 56th Kouhaku Uta Gassen

== Charts ==
Oricon Sales Chart (Japan)

| Release | Chart | Peak position | Sales total |
|---|---|---|---|
| 23 March 2005 | Oricon Daily Singles Chart | 2 | |
| 23 March 2005 | Oricon Weekly Singles Chart | 3 | 41,936 copies sold |
| 23 March 2005 | Oricon Yearly Singles Chart | 97 | 97,218 copies sold |
