= Be Together (TM Network song) =

1987 song by TM Network

Song by TM Network

from the album Humansystem
- Released: 11 November 1987
- Recorded: July – August 1987
- Genre: Synthpop; big beat; J-pop
- Length: 3:07
- Label: Epic/Sony Records
- Songwriter(s): Mitsuko Komuro and Tetsuya Komuro
- Producer(s): Tetsuya Komuro

"Be Together" is a song from Japanese band TM Network released in 11 November 1987. It was written by Mitsuko Komuro and composed by Tetsuya Komuro, it was included in their fifth album Humansystem. Despite the fact that it wasn't released as a single and was not popular at its initial release, the 1999 cover made by Ami Suzuki the song became very popular in Japan, and it has since been covered by several artists.

Scandinavian artist Ni-Ni created a cover of "Be Together", which was included in the video game Dance Dance Revolution 5th Mix, and is also featured on her album Mermaid among her most popular songs. In 2010 it was also covered by voice actor and singer Minori Chihara for the anime series Occult Academy.

== Ami Suzuki version ==
"Be Together"

Single by Ami Suzuki

from the album Infinity Eighteen Vol. 1
- B-side: "Night Sky"
- Released: 14 July 1999 (JP)
- Recorded: 1999
- Genre: J-pop; synthpop
- Label: Sony Music; AICT-1063 (Japan, CD); AIJT-5035 (Japan, vinyl)
- Songwriter(s): Mitsuko Komuro and Tetsuya Komuro
- Producer(s): Tetsuya Komuro

Ami Suzuki singles chronology
"Don't Leave Me Behind/Silent Stream" (1999)	"Be Together" (1999)	"Our Days" (1999)

"Be Together" was released as the seventh single by J-pop singer Ami Suzuki, on July 14, 1999. It was produced by Tetsuya Komuro (formerly of TM Network, who had originally released the song). The song was used in TV commercials of Mos Burger, and it became one of the most popular songs of 1999 in Japan.

=== Information ===
This is Suzuki's first cover recording, curiously of her mentor Tetsuya Komuro's group of the 80's TM Network. The single was released in two formats: maxi single and vinyl. The maxi included original and instrumental version the song, a live-like version, and also a b-side titled "Night Sky". It became her first number one single on the Oricon charts and became the 17th best selling single of 1999.

Following her blacklisting from the music industry in September 2000, production and distribution of the single stopped in its entirety.

In 2008 the song was re-arranged by Yasutaka Nakata, and since then when Suzuki performs live this version is used, though it hasn't been officially released.

=== Track listing ===
CD single
No.	Title	Lyrics	Music	Music and arrangement	Length
1.	"Be Together (Original Mix)"	Mitsuko Komuro	Tetsuya Komuro	Tetsuya Komuro	4:22
2.	"Be Together (Band Mix)"				4:11
3.	"Night Sky"	Marc	Cozy Kubo	Cozy Kubo	4:21
4.	"Be Together (TV Mix)"				4:22

Vinyl
No.	Title	Lyrics	Music	Music and Arrangement	Length
1.	"Be Together (Original Mix)"				4:19
2.	"Be Together (TV Mix)"				4:20
3.	"Don't Leave Me Behind (Mood II Swing Club Mix)"	Marc	Cozy Kubo	Cozy Kubo	4:53
4.	"Don't Leave Me Behind (Mood II Swing Club Instrumental)"				4:41

=== Personnel ===
- Ami Suzuki – vocals

=== Production ===
- Producer – Tetsuya Komuro

=== Charts ===
Oricon Sales Chart (Japan)

Release	Chart	Peak position
14 July 1999	Oricon Daily Singles Chart	1
14 July 1999	Oricon Weekly Singles Chart	1
14 July 1999	Oricon Monthly Singles Chart	2
14 July 1999	Oricon Yearly Singles Chart	17
