= Negaigoto =

"Negaigoto (ねがいごと)"

Single by Ami Suzuki

from the album Around the World
- Released: 17 August 2005
- Recorded: 2005
- Genre: J-pop
- Label: Avex Trax; AVCD-30774/B (Japan, CD+DVD); AVCD-30775 (Japan, CD)
- Composer: Daisuke Suzuki
- Lyricist: Ami Suzuki

Ami Suzuki singles chronology
"Eventful" (2005)	"Negaigoto (ねがいごと)" (2005)	"Around the World" (2005)

"Negaigoto" (ねがいごと) is the third single released by Ami Suzuki under label Avex Trax.

"Negaigoto" is a ballad, rather than an upbeat trance song like her previous Avex singles. The song debuted at number 13 on the weekly charts and has sold over 22,000 copies. "Negaigoto"'s B-side was named "Times" and was an upbeat song. All the songs were written by Suzuki.

== Track listing ==
All lyrics are written by Ami Suzuki.

CD single (CD Only, CD+DVD)
No.	Title	Music	Arrangement	Length
1.	"Negaigoto (ねがいごと)"	Daisuke Suzuki	Yasunari Nakamura	5:10
2.	"Times"	Tohru Watanabe	Tohru Watanabe	4:17
3.	"Negaigoto (Electronic Remix)"	Daisuke Suzuki	M.O.R.	5:29
4.	"Negaigoto (Dub's The Wish was Fulfilled Remix)"	Daisuke Suzuki	Dub Master X	5:09
5.	"Negaigoto (Instrumental)"			5:10
6.	"Times (Instrumental)"			4:17

DVD
No.	Title	Length
1.	"Negaigoto (Music Clip)"
2.	"Negaigoto (Making Clip)"

== Live performances ==
- 12 August 2005 — Music Fighter
- 18 August 2005 — Utaban
- 26 August 2005 — PopJam

== Charts ==
Oricon Sales Chart (Japan)

Release	Chart	Peak position	Sales total
17 August 2005	Oricon Daily Singles Chart	9	
17 August 2005	Oricon Weekly Singles Chart	13	22,000 copies sold
17 August 2005	Oricon Yearly Singles Chart	397	
