= Ami Suzuki =

- 鈴木亜美
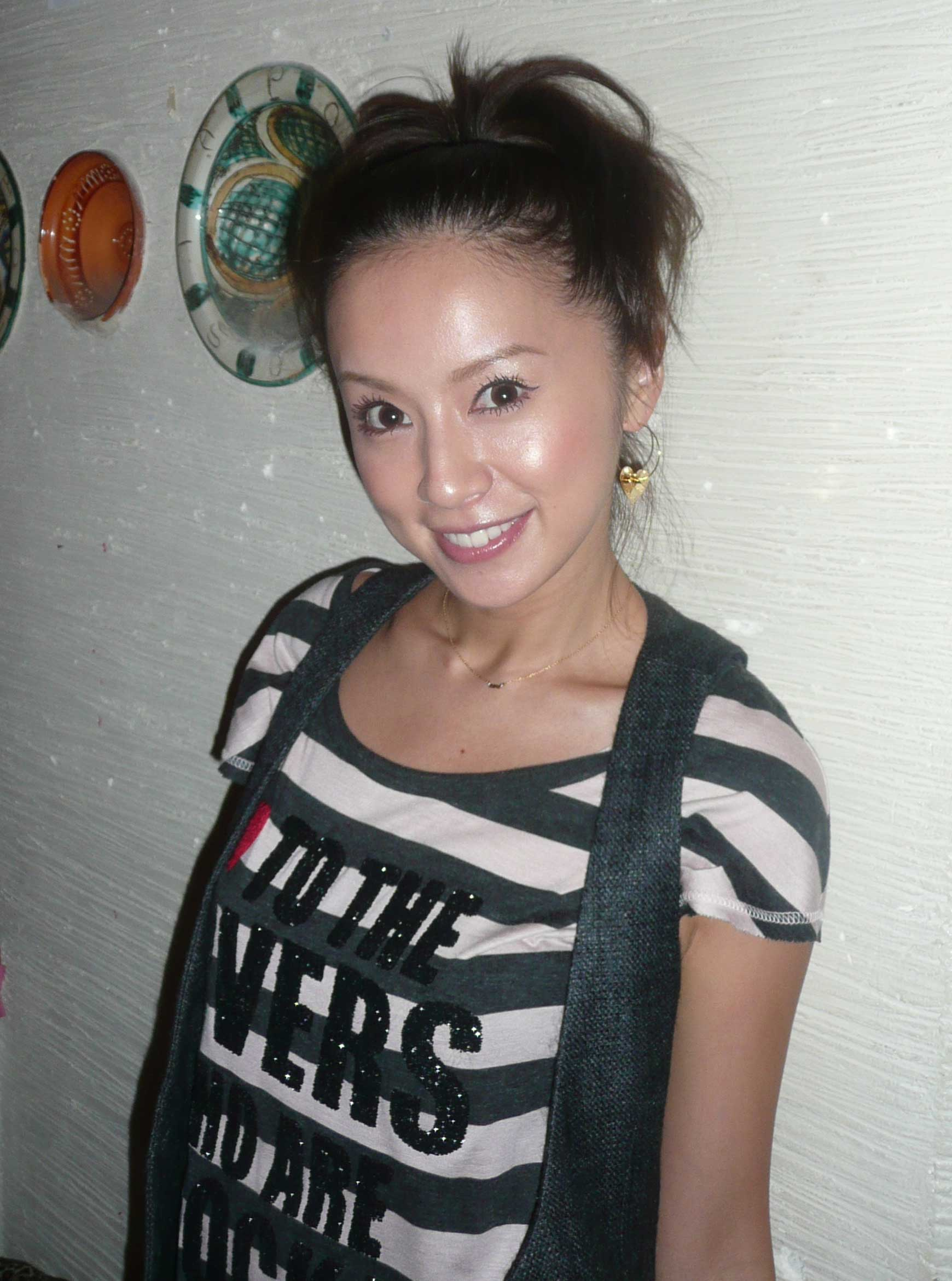
- Suzuki in November 2008
- Born: 9 February 1982 (age 44); Zama, Japan
- Education: Nihon University
- Occupations: Singer; songwriter; DJ; actress
- Spouse: Unknown (m. 2016)
- Children: 3
- Musical career
- Also known as: Ami-Go (あみ～ゴ)
- Genres: Pop; dance-pop; EDM; electro house; electropop; Eurobeat
- Instruments: Vocals; guitar; piano
- Years active: 1998–2001; 2004–present
- Labels: True Kiss Disc (1998–2001); Amity (2004); Avex Trax (2005–present)
- Website: avexnet.or.jp/ami

Ami Suzuki (鈴木亜美, Suzuki Ami; born 9 February 1982) is a Japanese recording artist, DJ, and actress from Zama, Kanagawa, Japan. Following her late 90s fame as a popular teen idol, Suzuki went on to become known for her self-penned lyrics and music production.

In 2000, Suzuki entered a legal battle with her management company, which resulted her being blacklisted from the entertainment industry. Suzuki independently released two singles before signing to Avex Trax in 2005. Suzuki has also made a name for herself in the acting field, starring in various movies, television series, and musicals.

== Biography ==
=== 1998: Asayan ===
While attending high school, Suzuki auditioned for Japanese talent show Asayan, which was searching for a young vocalist under the direct guidance of Tetsuya Komuro. She preferred athletics at the time and was reluctant to travel from her home in Kanagawa, but was convinced by a friend. From 13,500 contestants, only five girls were chosen to be in the final round, and 15-year-old Suzuki was voted as the finalist winner.

Her debut single, "Love the Island", was released on 1 July 1998. The song was used to promote Japanese tourism in the island of Guam. The single debuted at number five on the Oricon charts. On 17 September 1998, her second single "Alone in My Room" was released, which debuted at number three.

In October 1998, Suzuki started her own radio show on Nippon Hōsō called Run! Run! Ami-Go!, and signed a deal with Kissmark for advertisements and promotion all around Asia. Sony then began promoting her third single, "All Night Long". Later that year, Suzuki won the Japan Record Award for Best New Artist.

=== 1999–2000: Debut ===
In 1999, Suzuki released her first photo book, titled Ami-Go, which sold around 200,000 copies. In March, her debut album SA was released, becoming one of the top ten best selling albums of 1999. During the release of her seventh single "Be Together", Suzuki competed with later chart rival Ayumi Hamasaki for the first time, who had just released her ninth single "Boys & Girls". Suzuki's next single, titled "Our Days", ranked number one in the charts later that year. At the end of the year, Suzuki released her eighth single: "Happy New Millennium".

In January 2000, Suzuki released "Don't Need to Say Good Bye" which debuted at number 5. A week later, the singer released her second studio album, Infinity Eighteen Vol. 1, which debuted at number one. Suzuki has said of this first period of her career that she was not free to do what she wanted and only followed what she was told, leaving her feeling "pretty disheartened and down, like there was no future". Suzuki had been writing lyrics from an early age, and continued to pass these on to her manager and producers. The first song to feature them was her tenth Sony single: "Don't Need to Say Goodbye". The lyrics were influenced by events occurring in her personal life at that time, Suzuki commenting: "Putting my thoughts and feelings into my singing is more important to me than sales, and chart rankings."

Three months after Infinity Eighteen Vol.1, Suzuki released "Thank You 4 Every Day Every Body" in the beginning of April, and her third studio album, Infinity Eighteen Vol.2, later that same month. "Reality/Dancin' in Hip-Hop" was later released as Suzuki's 12th single in September 2000.

=== 2000–2002: Industry blacklisting ===
In 2000 Suzuki's career came to a halt when Eiji Yamada, the President of her production company AG Communication, was convicted on tax evasion charges. AG Communication had evaded tax by under-reporting their earnings, and by consequence were underpaying royalties to artists. Suzuki's parents Tadao and Miyako Suzuki sued AG Communication for termination of her contract on these grounds, and that the association would taint her image. The Tokyo District Court ruled in Suzuki's favor, but the lawsuit resulted in Suzuki's blacklisting from the entertainment industry. In court documents, it was revealed that AG Communication had paid her very little: despite eight-figure record sales that year, Suzuki earned just $1500 a month at the start of her career, and a 0.4% royalty rate on CDs, raised to 0.55% in 1999.

Having lost all of her endorsements, Suzuki was faced with the problem of production companies refusing to work with her publicly. Her relationship with long-time collaborator Tetsuya Komuro also ceased. A compilation album of Suzuki's tracks, Fun for Fan, was released on 30 May 2001. It reached number one on the Oricon charts, despite the fact that Sony had ceased all public promotions and removed her back catalogue from stores.

=== 2003–2004: Independent activities ===
In 2003, Suzuki negotiated an out-of-court agreement with Sony. Her contract with the label was scheduled to end in December 2004. Eiji Yamada was subsequently fined; government officials eventually linked to the scandal to former Education Minister Takashi Kosugi and two other legislators, who allegedly received 34 million yen in unofficial payments. About this period, Suzuki herself has said "I really didn't know what was going on, there were many lies were being thrown about in the media. For people to hear things and believe that to be the truth was a surprise, and I suddenly realized the kind of world I was in. What kept me going was the thought of one day being able to tell the truth myself."

Following the blacklisting, Suzuki changed her stage name from 鈴木あみ (kanji/hiragana) to 鈴木亜美. In April 2004, the singer found that "adding a CD to a book, such as those found in language-teaching books, would be a possible alternative" for being able to independently release her work. Suzuki later debuted a photobook called Tsuyoi Kizuna that included a CD single, published by Tokyo-based Bungeishunjū. The photobook went to sell over 150,000 copies, reaching number one of best-selling non-fiction books in Japan. In August of the same year, she released another single titled "Forever Love", this time on her own independent label Amity. The release reached number twenty-one on the Oricon chart, and number one in Oricon's Indies Singles Chart. In addition, a four-track mini concert DVD titled 2004 Summer Fly Hight: Ami Shower was released on 17 November.

Through October and November Suzuki had performances at various festivals, and in December she began the Ami's Love for You – Live tour. During its final concert, Suzuki officially announced her transfer to Avex, and her comeback to the major music industry.

=== 2005–2006: Around the World ===
On 1 January 2005, Suzuki's website under the Avex label was opened. Her first song under her new label, "Hopeful", was released digitally on 9 February, and on 25 March her first physical single, titled "Delightful", was released. Her second single under the Avex label, "Eventful", was released on 25 May. "Negaigoto", was later released on 17 August; its b-side, "Times", was used as the theme of a TV commercial for N's Street Online Shopping. During August, her new official Mobile Fan Club Ami Sapuri was opened, and Suzuki announced that a live tour would start in the following months. That summer, the singer also participated in A-Nation for the first time.

Suzuki released her first studio album in five years, Around the World, on 12 October 2005. In November, celebrating the Japanese 55th Anniversary of Snoopy, Suzuki released a single titled "Happiness is...", which was sold exclusively at the Snoopy Life Design Happiness is the 55th Anniversary event held in Tokyo. On 7 December, Suzuki released her fifth Avex single, "Little Crystal". On 31 December, Suzuki was awarded with the Gold Prize for Best New Artist at the 47th Japan Record Awards.

On 8 February 2006, Suzuki released her sixth Avex single, "Fantastic", which was used as third opening theme of the TV anime series Blackjack. On 29 March, her first remix album, titled Amix World, was released. The album included remixes made by Japanese and international producers, including Space Cowboy, Clazziquai Project, Jonathan Peters and Ferry Corsten. For her fifth single "Alright!", released on 17 May, she distanced herself from her previous trance-influenced dance material and explored a more mainstream sound. Suzuki's eighth single on Avex, "Like a Love?", was released 26 July 2006. In October of the same year, Suzuki debuted as a movie actress in Rainbow Song, directed by Naoto Kumazawa and produced by Shunji Iwai.

=== 2007: Connetta and Dolce ===
In February 2007, Suzuki officially started a new project called "Join". Collaboration singles with Buffalo Daughter, THC!! and Kirinji were released in a three-week period starting on 28 February to 14 March. Her "Join" album and second Avex album, Connetta, was released on 21 March, and included collaborations with several artists including Hideki Kaji, Scoobie Do, Ayano Tsuji and Northern Bright. The album peaked at number twenty-six on the Japanese Oricon charts. Her acting career also continued; Suzuki starred in the live action drama Skull Man, and also the collaboration drama Under the Magnolia, in which she starred the leading role along with Lee Wan.

Suzuki's fourth "Join" single and first Avex double A-side single, "Free Free/Super Music Maker", was released on 22 August 2007. For this single's promotion Suzuki's image changed drastically; her new look was called as "ero-pop" by herself and by the media, drawing comparisons to Avex contemporary Koda Kumi. In December 2007 it was announced that Suzuki would be starring a new TV drama called Oishii Depachika. It premiered in January 2008 on TV Asahi.

=== 2008–2011: Supreme Show and DJ debut ===
In 2008, Suzuki celebrated her tenth anniversary in the music industry. Suzuki released her second "Join" album and third Avex studio album, Dolce, on 6 February. Suzuki's fifth collaboration single, "One", was released on 2 July. At the release party of the single on 5 July, Suzuki officially launched her career as a DJ and performed live along with Nakata. The second anniversary single, "Can't Stop the Disco", released on 24 September. Her tenth anniversary album, Supreme Show, was released on 12 November.

In September 2008, Suzuki debuted as the main character in the Avex 20th anniversary musical, Kokoro no Kakera, along with Yu-ki from TRF. In November, Suzuki played the main role in another TV drama: this time for the 40th anniversary special remake of Ai no Gekijo's Love Letter. "Potential Breakup Song"—a cover of Aly & AJ's single of the same name—was released on 28 November. Aly & AJ's version of the song was used as the theme song of horror/comedy film XX (X Cross), in which Suzuki starred as the lead role along with Nao Matsushita.

Suzuki's 28th single, "Reincarnation", produced by Taku Takahashi of M-Flo, was released in February 2009. From 27 September – 7 August 2009, Suzuki starred in her second musical: Blood Brothers. Suzuki recorded a song called "Kiss Kiss Kiss", which appeared on the House Nation compilation Aquamarine. In 2010, Suzuki's cover version of Kylie Minogue's international hit "Can't Get You Out of My Head" appeared on the compilation "Tokyo Girls Collection" 10th Anniversary Runway Anthem. She also collaborated with special unit Phoenix 2:00am, providing vocals for "Living in the Castle". In July 2010, Suzuki released Blooming, her first compilation album as a DJ. In August 2011, Suzuki provided guest vocals for the collaboration song "Thx A Lot".

On 9 February 2011, a birthday concert live was broadcast online via the website Nico Nico Douga. In March 2011, after the 2011 Tōhoku earthquake and tsunami, Suzuki joined Gackt's charity campaign "Show Your Heart". On 27 July, a newly recorded version of her debut single "Love the Island" was released. On 7 December, Suzuki released her first Avex greatest hits album: Ami Selection. The tracklist consisted of singles from across her career, including indie single "Tsuyoi Kizuna".

=== 2012–2013: Snow Ring ===
In 2012, Suzuki starred as the host of Who's Shining??, which she organized and participated in as one of the DJs. Participating artists included Genki Rockets and May's. In July, the singer released a series of iPhone cases that she designed, as well as a Hello Kitty which was exhibited in Tokyo. In September, Suzuki participated in the musical Hashire Melos along with musicians Ryuichi Kawamura, Kazumi Morohoshi, Izam, and Nami Tamaki.

Snow Ring was released as an EP on 6 February 2013. The EP also included the full Ami Suzuki 19th Anniversary Live concert.

=== 2014–2020: Graduation, marriage ===
On 2 June 2014, a new single titled "Graduation" was announced. The song, which commemorated Suzuki's 15th anniversary since her debut, was the first song produced by Komuro since 2000. It was released digitally on 4 June.

On 1 July 2016, Suzuki announced her marriage. Together, she and her partner have two sons (born 2017 and 2020) and a daughter (born 2022).

=== 2021-present: Ami no AmiGo TV, 25th anniversary ===
In January 2021, Suzuki launched Suzuki Ami no AmiGo TV (Ami Suzuki's AmiGo TV; 鈴木亜美のあみーゴTV) on YouTube, which features her showcasing spicy food. When asked about her current work, she said: "Right now, I want to work harder on food product development, so I recently obtained a qualification as a spice sommelier. Since my life revolves around raising my children and doing housework, I would like to share the recipes I learn through YouTube." In September, Suzuki released digital single "Drip", which was also used as the theme for Taiwanese movie My First Coffee. Promotion included a music video uploaded to the singer's YouTube channel; her first in twelve years.

From 2022, Suzuki returned to holding live concerts, which have included Ami Suzuki Birthday Live: 40 Times Super Spicy, Ami Suzuki & Maki Goto Xmas Talk & Live 2022, and Ami Suzuki 25th Anniversary Live: Let's Party. On 1 July 2023, Suzuki released digital single "I Just Feel Good" with TeddyLoid to celebrate her twenty-fifth anniversary since debut.

In April 2025, Suzuki performed alongside Tetsuya Komuro at the JigoRock 2025 festival held in Oita, Japan. Other performers included Akina Nakamori, Kiyoshi Hikawa, and Denki Groove.

== Discography ==
- SA (1999)
- Infinity Eighteen Vol. 1 (2000)
- Infinity Eighteen Vol.2 (2000)
- Around the World (2005)
- Connetta (2007)
- Dolce (2008)
- Supreme Show (2008)

== Photobooks ==
- AmiGo, 1999
- Amix, 2000
- Ami '02 Natsu, 2002
- Ami Book, 2003
- Tsuyoi Kizuna, 2004

== Awards ==
Years	Awards
1998	All Japan Request Awards – Best New Artist; The Japan Record Awards – Best New Artist; The Japan Record Awards – Gold Prize – "all night long"
1999	All Japan Request Awards – Grand Prix; The Japan Record Awards – The Award
2000	Japan Gold Disc Awards – Pop Album of the Year – "SA"
2001	Japan Gold Disc Awards – Pop Album of the Year – "infinity eighteen vol.1"
2005	The Beauty Week Award – Best Female Singer; Best Hit Song Festival Gold Prize – Best Pop Artist; The Japan Record Awards – Best New Artist after 7 years Ami won this award again as a renovated artist.; The Japan Record Awards – Gold Prize – "Eventful"

== Filmography ==
=== Film ===
Year	Film	Role	Notes
2005	Rainbow Song	Sayumi Kubo	
2007	X-Cross	Aiko Hiuke	Lead role
2012	Ghost Writer Hotel	Megumi Kamei	
2012	Ouran High School Host Club	Kotoko Fujioka	

=== Television ===
Year	TV show	Role	Notes
2000	Dive Deep	Kami Inoue	Lead role
2007	Skull Man: Prologue of Darkness	Michiko Komyōji	Lead role
2007	Under the Magnolia	Miki	Lead role
2007	Itsumo Kimochi Switch o	Keiko Katakura	Guest in third episode
2008	Oishii Depachika	Mari Hiuma	Lead role
2008	Otome		Lead role in 5 episodes
2008	Shichi-nin no Onna Bengoshi	Mutsumi Tashiro	Guest in first episode of season 2
2008	Love Letter: Love Theatre, 40th Anniversary Show	Minami Tadokoro (adult)	Lead role
2009	Mayonaka no Satsujinsha		Special of Yonimo Kimyō na Monogatari
2009	Love Game	Tsubaki Yayoi	Guest in third episode
2009	Ohitorisama	Chihiro Aoki	Guest in third episode
2010	Face Maker	Nobuko Kisaragi (Ayumi Okamoto)	Guest in ninth episode
2011	Shin Keishichō Sōsa Ikka 9 Gakari	Kanazawa Misato	Guest in third episode of season 3
2011	Ouran High School Host Club	Kotoko Fujioka	Guest in first episode
2020	The Way of the Househusband	Ayaka Chigira	Guest in third episode

=== Theater plays ===
- Kokoro no Kakera (2008)
- Blood Brothers (2009)
- King of the Blue (2010)
- Watashi no Atama no Naka no Keshigomu (2010)
- Genghis Khan: Wa ga Tsurugi, Nessa o Shime yo (2011)
- Hashire Melos (2012)
- Shinshū Tenma Kyō (2013)

=== TV commercials ===
- Guam Tourism Campaigns (June 1998 – December 1998)
- Alpen Snowboards' Kissmark (October 1998 – January 1999)
- PlayStation 2's Monster Rancher 2 (February 1999 – April 1999)
- Asahi Soft Drinks's Bireley's (March 1999 – December 2000)
- Kodak Cameras (April 1999 – March 2001)
- MOS Burger (July 1999)
- Kanebo Cosmetics' Prostyle (September 1999 – June 2001)
- ECCJ's Summer/Winter Energy Saving Campaign (February 2000 – August 2000)
- Bourbon (September 2000 – June 2001)
- Music.jp (November 2004 – December 2004)
- Nexus Web Marketing's N's Street (August 2005)
- Mister Donut/Avex CD Campaign (July 2008)
- Sanyo Shinpan Finance's Pocket Bank (May 2009)
- Nissei Advance 10th Anniversary (Oct 2011)
