= Halcali Mix =

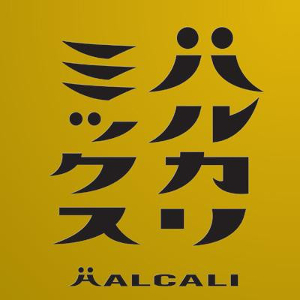

Remix album by Halcali
- Released: March 16, 2005
- Genre: J-pop, Japanese hip hop
- Label: For Life

Halcali chronology
Ongaku no Susume (2004)	Halcali Mix (2005)	Cyborg Oretachi (2007)

Halcali Mix (ハルカリミックス) is the first remix album by Halcali. The title is a play on the words Halcali and Mix in order to also make the word Remix because of the katakana lack of differentiation between roman L and R characters. Therefore, the title is sometimes referred to as Halcali Remix or Halcalimix.

== Track listing ==
=== CD ===
1. "タンデム (MUTABLE CHROMOSOME REMIX)" (Tandem)
  - Remixed by Yuka Honda (本田ゆか)
2. "エレクトリック先生 (electric body sensei mix)" (Electric Sensei, Electric Teacher)
  - Remixed by Takkyu Ishino (石野卓球)
3. "ストロベリーチップス (fascinate mix)" (Strawberry Chips)
  - Remixed by Yasuyuki Okamura (岡村靖幸)
4. "ギリギリ･サーフライダー (HALF RIDER remix)" (Girigiri Surfrider, A Surfrider at the Last Moment)
  - Remixed by Halfby
5. "二福星 (FORCE OF NATURE Remix)" (Nifukusei, Two Lucky Stars)
  - Remixed by Force of Nature
6. "マーチングマーチ (K・U・D・O Remix)" (Marching March)
  - Remixed by K・U・D・O
7. "愛" (Ai, Love)
  - from Magokoro Covers (Produced by Kohei Japan (Mellow Yellow))
8. "Peek-A-Boo (DJ Mitsu the Beats remix)"
  - Remixed by DJ Mitsu the Beats
9. "スタイリースタイリー (Hiroshi Kawanabe Remix)" (Stylee Stylee)
  - Remixed by Hiroshi Kawanabe of Tokyo No.1 Soul Set
10. "Baby Blue! (Baby Blue Is Good Mix)"
  - Remixed by Your Song Is Good
11. "Halcali Beat Edition"
  - (Bonus Track) Edited by Halfby
