= Super Music Maker =

- Artwork that commercializes "Free Free"/"Super Music Maker"

Single by Ami Suzuki joins Yasutaka Nakata

from the album Dolce and Supreme Show
- A-side: "Free Free"
- Released: August 22, 2007
- Recorded: 2007
- Studio: Avex Studio (Tokyo, Japan)
- Genre: Eropop
- Length: 7:25 (original version); 5:05 (radio edit)
- Label: Avex Trax
- Songwriter: Yasutaka Nakata
- Producer: Yasutaka Nakata

Ami Suzuki singles chronology
| "Sore mo Kitto Shiawase" (2007) | "Super Music Maker" (2007) | "Potential Breakup Song" (2007) |

Yasutaka Nakata singles chronology
| "Free Free"/"Super Music Maker" (2007) | ""Crazy Crazy"/ "Harajuku Iyahoi"" (2017) |

"Super Music Maker" (capitalized as SUPER MUSIC MAKER) is a song recorded by Japanese recording artist and songwriter Ami Suzuki, for her sixth studio album Dolce (2008) and a re-recorded version for her seventh album Supreme Show (2008). Featuring Japanese record producer and Capsule member Yasutaka Nakata, the song was released as the lead single and double a-side single with "Free Free" from Dolce on August 22, 2007 through Avex Trax. Nakata had written, produced and arranged both tracks and is her first single to be handled by Nakata following later singles from her album Supreme Show (2008). Backed by synthesizers and keyboards, "Free Free" incorporates a new genre called "Eropop" with influences of electronic dance, house and disco music. The lyrical interpretation was based on the theme of erotica and freedom.

Critical response to "Super Music Maker" was positive; some critics praised the song's composition and highlighted it as a career stand out track. Charting together with "Free Free", the physical single reached number thirty-two on the Japanese Oricon Singles Chart and stayed in there for four weeks. It sold over 10,000 units in Japan, her highest sales rank since 2006 and her last single to reach the limit. To promote "Super Music Maker", she hosted a release party event at Tower Records in Shibuya.

== Background and release ==
"Super Music Maker" was written, produced, composed and arranged by Japanese musician and Capsule member Yasutaka Nakata and is his first featuring single with Suzuki under the alias "Ami Suzuki joins Yasutaka Nakata"; It is her debut single to be handled by Nakata, and was followed by her June 2008 single "One" and September 2008 single "Can't Stop the Disco". It was recorded in early-2007 by Nakata at Avex Studio, Tokyo, Japan and was co-distributed by Nakata's label Contemode, owned by Avex and Yamaha in Japan. After the release of her album Connetta in 2007, Suzuki visited various night clubs in Japan to perform; her staff, who were present at the time of her performances, noticed her engagement to club music and tried to find a producer who had a background of electronic dance music and eventually contacted Nakata; He accepted an offer to produce two tracks for the album. Regarding the production, she commented that "I want to put out a whole new view of the world".

With Suzuki's vocals being processed with autotune and vocoder post-production work, "Super Music Maker" is a "funky" dance and disco song. "Super Music Maker" is recorded in both Japanese and features the English lyrics "Super music maker". While composing the track, knowing the single was to be influenced by Erotica, Nakata fused pop music with the theme and made "Eropop".

== Release ==
"Super Music Maker" was released as a double a-side single with "Free Free" as a digital download and a physical release on August 22, 2007 by Avex, as the lead single by Suzuki's sixth studio album Dolce (2007). It released in three formats; a stand-alone CD single, a CD and DVD bundle, and a digital download. The CD and digital release contains the two singles, an extended edit of "Free Free" and a radio edit of "Super Music Maker". The DVD features a music video of "Free Free", and is registered under NTSC Region 2. An exclusive vinyl was released in Japan by Japanese distribution label Rhythmic Republic on August 29, releasing extended version of "Free Free" and the original "Super Music Maker". Both songs were co-copyrighted and published through the Japanese Society for Rights of Authors, Composers and Publishers.

The cover sleeve was photographed by Japanese director Takashiro Akihisa, who directed the music video for "Free Free". The DVD and CD have to separate covers; the first has Suzuki bending over and the latter with Suzuki kneeling down, all in front of club lights in a pink mini-dress. According to an editor for website Sanspo, they compared the artwork to the covers by Japanese recording artist Koda Kumi and commended the shoot for being "sexy". The sleeve was placed at the back of the jewelcase and an outtake was used as the booklet for the CD.

== Reception ==
"Super Music Maker" received positive reviews from selected music critics and reviews. CDJournal.com was positive towards "Super Music Maker", as they commended the "childish charm" and "super funky" composition of the track. On the Ami Suzuki artist page on the Japanese HMV site, "Free Free/Super Music Maker" was listed as a "masterpiece" collection from Suzuki's discography. An editorial review on the website commended Nakata's collaboration as a "charm" and commended the packaging for her "great sense of fashion". An editorial review on the Japanese Amazon.co.jp website commended the collaboration and felt the musical approach was "exciting". Japanese online retail store Technique gave the song a positive review, labelling it catchy and dreamy.

Charting together as a single, "Free Free/Super Music Maker" entered and peaked at thirty-two on the Japanese Oricon Singles Chart on September 3, 2007 with over 5,900 units sold; It is her highest entry since her 2006 single "Like a Love?" and remained her highest up until her 2008 single "One" at seventeen. Falling outside of the top fifty in its second week, "Free Free" stayed in the top 100 charts for four weeks, her longest charting single since "Like a Love?" with five weeks and eventually tied in with future singles "One" and September 2008 single "Can't Stop the Disco". It was her first top forty single inside of the 2007 era and sold over 10,000 units; this is her highest selling single since "Like a Love?" with 16,000 units and her final single to reach over the 10,000 sale limit. (Note: Sales provided by Oricon database and are rounded to the nearest thousand copies.) According to her sales profile on Oricon, "Free Free" and "Super Music Maker" are ranked at number twenty-one respectively.

== Promotion and other usage ==
No music video was shot for the single. In 2008, while Suzuki was recording her studio album Supreme Show, Nakata re-arranged the composition of "Super Music Maker" and she re-recorded the song as a b-side to her single "Can't Stop the Disco". This version was then featured on Supreme Show the following year in November 2008. She performed the song in 2008 on her launch event for her single "One".

== Formats and track listings ==
These are the formats and track listings of major single releases of "Free Free/Super Music Maker".

- CD Single and digital download
1. "Free Free" — 5:08
2. "Super Music Maker" — 7:25
3. "Free Free" (Extended edit) — 7:34
4. "Super Music Maker" (Radio edit) — 5:05
- CD and DVD bundle
1. "Free Free" — 5:08
2. "Super Music Maker" — 7:25
3. "Free Free" (Extended edit) — 7:34
4. "Super Music Maker" (Radio edit) — 5:05
5. "Free Free" (music video)
- 7" Vinyl
1. "Free Free" (Extended edit) — 7:34
2. "Super Music Maker" — 7:25
- Album version digital download
1. "Free Free" (Radio edit) — 5:08

== Personnel ==
Management

- Recorded by Nakata at Avex Studio, Tokyo, Japan
- Mixed by Nakata at Avex Studio, Tokyo, Japan
- Avex Trax management for Suzuki; Contemode management for Nakata.

Personnel

- Ami Suzuki – vocals, background vocals
- Yasutaka Nakata – songwriting, composition, production, arrangement, management
- Takashiro Akihisa - music video director

Credits adapted from the promotional CD single.

== Charts ==
| Chart (2007) | Peak position |
|---|---|
| Japan Daily Chart (Oricon) | 16 |
| Japan Weekly Chart (Oricon) | 32 |

== Release history ==
List of release dates by region, including format details, and record label
| Country | Date | Format | Label |
|---|---|---|---|
| Japan | August 22, 2007 | CD | Avex Trax |
| Japan | August 22, 2007 | CD and DVD | Avex Trax |
| Japan | August 22, 2007 | Digital download | Avex Trax |
