= Cyborg Oretachi =

Studio album by Halcali
- Released: July 18, 2007
- Genres: J-pop, hip-pop
- Label: Sony Music Entertainment Japan

Halcali chronology
Halcali Mix (2007)	Cyborg Oretachi (2007)	Tokyo Groove (2010)

Cyborg Oretachi (サイボーグ俺達, We, the Cyborgs) is the first major label album by Japanese band Halcali, their third original album, and fourth album release overall. It was released in 2007. The first press limited edition came with a bonus DVD. It is Halcali's first album to be released in both CD only, and CD+DVD formats, with both having the same covers but with addons. The CD+DVD format has small robots with human faces coming out of the pink robot for the cover.

Cyborg Oretachi also includes productions by O.T.F, Utamaru (Rhymester), Natalie Wise, Honestly, and Fantastic Plastic Machine, as well as collaborations and guest performances from Dr.kyOn (ex Bo Gumbos), Ram Rider, Your Song Is Good, Polysics, Skaparahorns, and Kendo Kobayashi.

Even though the single "Tōgenkyō / Lights, Camera. Action!" was listed as a double A-side, "Lights, Camera. Action!" is not on the album.

== Track listing ==
=== CD ===
1. "Doo The Hammer!!"
2. "It's Party Time!"
3. "恋のブブブン" (Koi no Bububun, The Vroom Vroom Vroom of Love)
4. "Twinkle Star"
5. "endless lover's rain"
6. "LOOK～Special Edition～" (Look: Special Edition)
7. "サイボーグ俺達" (Cyborg Oretachi, We, the Cyborgs)
8. "ドライバーズ・ライセンス feat.宇多丸（RHYMESTER）" (Driver's License feat. Utamaru (Rhymester))
9. "フェスでウィッス！" (Fes de Ouissu!, Kickin' it at the Festival)
10. "桃源郷" (Tōgenkyō, Shangri-la)
11. "Tip Taps Tip "
12. "春狩道～19の夜～" (HaruKari Michi~19 no Yoru~, The Halcali Road: 19 Nights)

=== DVD ===
1. "Tip Taps Tip"
2. "Twinkle Star"
3. "Look"
4. "桃源郷" (Tōgenkyō, Shangri-la)
5. "It's Party Time!"
6. "It's Party Time! Making"
