= Room Girl =

Studio album by Meg
- Released: June 9, 2003
- Recorded: 2001–2003
- Genre: J-pop, Shibuya-kei, electronica; experimental; jazz; electronic dance
- Label: Dream Machine
- Producer: Yasuyuki Okamura; CMJK; Nobuhiko Kashihara; Meg

Meg chronology
Room Girl (2003)	Dithyrambos (2006)

Singles from Room Girl
- 1. "Kasa to Shizuku" Released: November 28, 2001; 2. "Scanty Blues" Released: July 10, 2002; 3. "Ikenai Kotokai" / "Kasa to Shizuku" Released: September 11, 2002; 4. "Kōro" Released: March 26, 2003; 5. "Groove Tube" Released: June 11, 2003

Room Girl is the debut album by Japanese artist Meg, released on July 9, 2003. This album was released under Meg's then all-lowercase pseudonym "meg".

Room Girl peaked at number 87 on the Oricon weekly charts.

== Track listing ==
All lyrics are written by Meg, except for 'Groove Tube', written by Oyamada/Ozawa

CD
No.	Title	Lyrics	Music	Length
1.	"G no Ballad (Gのバラード)"	Meg	Yoshiko Gojima	5:11
2.	"Groove Tube"	Meg	Keigo Oyamada, Kenji Ozawa	5:28
3.	"Kasa to Shizuku (傘としずく)" (DJ Tatsuta remix)	Meg	DJ Tatsuta, Yasuyuki Okamura	6:12
4.	"Ikenai Koto kai (イケナイコトカイ)" (R.D.R. mix)	Meg	Yasuyuki Okamura, CMJK, Nobuhiko Kashihara	5:21
5.	"Kōro (光露)"	Meg	CMJK	4:27
6.	"Key"	Meg	Yasuyuki Okamura, Nobuhiko Kashihara	5:05
7.	"Scanty Blues (スキャンティブルース)"	Meg	Nobuhiko Kashihara	4:51
8.	"Room Girl (ルームガール)"	Meg	Nobuhiko Kashihara	6:58
9.	"Kanawanai Koto (かなわないこと。)"	Meg	Nobuhiko Kashihara	6:00

== Charts ==
Chart	Peak position
Oricon weekly chart	87
