= Japonaise =

Japonaise or La Japonaise may refer to:

- La Japonaise (painting), an 1876 painting by Claude Monet
- La Japonaise (album), a 2012 album by Meg
