= Tokyo Groove =

Studio album by Halcali
- Released: May 26, 2010
- Genre: J-pop, hip-pop
- Label: Sony Music Entertainment Japan

Halcali chronology
| Cyborg Oretachi (2007) | Tokyo Groove (2010) | Tokyo Connection (2011) |

Tokyo Groove is the fourth album by the female Japanese hip-hop unit Halcali. The album is their first in over three years.

The album is a two-disc set. The first disc is compiled with new and original material, the second disc contains cover and collaboration songs. The lead song of the second disc "My Sweet Darlin'" features the original artist, Hitomi Yaida, herself on the track as well.

Artists and producers that Halcali worked with on the album include Verbal (m-flo), Scha Dara Parr, Nona Reeves, Bikke, Suneohair, Ram Rider, and Aigon. Artists that Halcali collaborated with or covered on the second disc include Judy and Mary, Chara, Tokyo No.1 Soul Set, Tamio Okuda, and The Magokoro Brothers.

Tokyo Groove reached number 13 on the Oricon charts, and made its weekly ranking debut at number 20.

== Track listing ==
=== Disc 1: Original Songs ===
1. "Long Kiss Good Bye"
  - (Produced by Masataka Kitaura) (TV Tokyo anime Naruto Shippuden ending theme)
2. "カミナリ・GIRL" (Kaminari Girl, Thunder Girl)
  - (Produced by Shigekazu Aida)
3. "まばたき" (Mabataki, Flicker)
  - (Produced by Suneohair)
4. "Yes"
  - (Produced by Verbal (M-flo))
5. "Tears of Love"
  - (Produced by Bikke)
6. "Zig Zag Saturday Night"
  - (Produced by Nishidera Gouta) (Tokyo MX drama Musical 3 main theme)
7. "Endless Night"
  - (Produced by Ram Rider) (featuring Bose from Schadaraparr)
8. "Halcali Tokyo Groove Two Turntable Mix"
  - (タンデム/エレクトリック先生/ギリギリ・サーフライダー/ストロベリーチップス (Tandem/Electric Sensei/Girigiri Surf Rider/Strawberry Chips)) (Mixed by Piston Nishigawa)

=== Disc 2: Cover Songs ===
1. "My Sweet Darlin' feat. 矢井田瞳" (My Sweet Darlin' feat. Hitomi Yaida)
  - (Hitomi Yaida Special cover) (Produced by Ram Rider)
2. "今夜はブギー・バック" (Konya wa Boogie Back, Boogie Back Tonight)
  - (Schadaraparr cover) (Produced by Tokyo No.1 Soul Set) (Nissan Cube commercial song)
3. "Re:やさしい気持ち" -Album ver.- (Re:Yasashii Kimochi, Re:Tender Feelings)
  - (Heavily sampled from Chara) (Produced by pal@pop) (Japanese Broadcast Radio Charity Musician image theme song)
4. "愛のために" (Ai no Tame ni, Because of Love)
  - (Tamio Okuda cover) (Produced by Kohei Japan from Mellow Yellow)
5. "愛" (Ai, Love)
  - (Magokoro Brothers cover) (Produced by Kohei Japan from Mellow Yellow)
6. "すきすきソング" (Suki Suki Song, Like it Like it Song)
  - (Fujio Akatsuka cover) (Produced by Nona Reeves & Hiroyasu Yano)
7. "ラッキープール" (Lucky Pool)
  - (Judy and Mary cover) (Produced by Kohei Japan from Mellow Yellow)
8. "You May Dream -Halcali ver.-"
  - (Sheena & The Rokkets) (Produced by Tokyo No.1 Soul Set)

== Tie-Ups ==
- Long Kiss Good Bye: Ending theme song to the TV anime, "Naruto Shippuden", from October to December 2008. Also used on the show, "Televitamins", throughout December 2008.
- ZIG ZAG SATURDAY NIGHT: Main theme for the Tokyo Mx Drama, "MUSICAL3".
- 今夜はブギーバック (Konya wa Boogie Back): Commercial song for Nissan Motors' "Cube".
- Re:やさしい気持ち (Re:Yasashii Kimochi): Theme song for Nippon Broadcast's special, "Radio Charity Musicians". Also used on the show, "Televitamins", throughout February 2009.
