= Dolce (album) =

- Standard cover art.

Studio album by Ami Suzuki
- Released: February 6, 2008
- Genres: Dance; house; j-pop
- Length: 59:22
- Label: Avex Trax
- Producers: Yasutaka Nakata; Sugiurumn; S.A.; Ram Rider; Captain Funk; Tomoe Shinohara; Rocketman; Hoff Dylan

Ami Suzuki chronology
Connetta (2007)	Dolce (2008)	Supreme Show (2008)

Singles from Dolce
- 1. "Free Free/Super Music Maker" Released: 22 August 2007; 2. "Potential Breakup Song" Released: 28 November 2007

Dolce is the sixth studio album Japanese singer Ami Suzuki. Avex Trax released it in Japan on February 6, 2008, in a variety of formats. Max Matsuura executive produced Dolce, and is the second and final instalment of her "Join" series, which follows her previous album Connetta (2007). The "Join" series features a number of different producers and artists who worked together on various tracks from the album and appear as featured artists. Musically, Dolce is an upbeat dance record with house and j-pop influences.

Japanese music magazine CDJournal gave Dolce a positive review, complimenting the album's sound and overall production. The album was commercially unsuccessful. In Japan, it peaked at number 26 on the Oricon Albums Chart, selling only 10,000 copies. Along with Connetta, it is lowest-charting album in the country and her lowest-selling record to date. To promote the album, Avex Trax released two singles. The singles "Free Free" and "Super Music Maker" were released as double A-sides, and a cover version of Aly & AJ's "Potential Breakup Song" was released in Japan.

== Background and content ==
On March 21, 2007, Suzuki released her fifth studio album, Connetta. It was the first of her "Join" collaborations, in which she worked with a variety of producers while crediting them as featured artists. The album did not perform as well commercially unlike her previous efforts, only reaching the top forty of Japan's Oricon Albums Chart. Furthermore, the majority of the album's singles underperformed. Suzuki worked on her studio album after the album was released, as well as taking her acting career more seriously.

Avex Trax later announced the release of Dolce, her second "Join" album. The album contains 13 songs, all of which feature artists from her previous album. Max Matsuura executive produced Dolce, while Suzuki has a single writing credit on the album, which is for the song "If". The majority of the album was recorded in various studios in Tokyo, Japan, where Hiroshi Kawasaki mastered it. Japanese producer Captain Funk confirmed his involvement with the album in late January 2007, collaborating on the song "The Weekend". Dolce's musical core centres on club music, including disco notes ("Free Free", "Music"), electronic dance music ("Feel the Beat", "Potential Breakup Song", "The Weekend"), and general j-pop music ("Bitter...", "Stereo Love", "Futari wa Pop").

== Release and promotion ==
Dolce was released in Japan on February 6, 2008, by Avex Trax in various formats. The album was released on CD and included a bonus DVD with a music video for "Bitter" and behind-the-scenes footage from the album's production. First-press editions included the bonus track "If" as well as a limited edition photo album of Suzuki in Tokyo and New York City. In Japan, only the songs "Free Free", an extended mix of"Feel the Beat", "Bitter...", "Sweet Dance", and "The Weekend" were available on the album's limited-press vinyl. Avex Trax later distributed the album in digital and streaming formats.

A video collection titled Join Clips was also released, featuring the music videos of "O.K. Funky God", "Peace Otodoke!!", and "Sore mo Kitto Shiawase" from Connetta, and "Free Free" and "Potential Breakup Song" from Dolce, as well as their making-of videos. In December 2023, Avex Trax re-packaged Dolce, its music videos, and her previous albums in a boxset titled 2SA: Ami Suzuki 25th Anniversary Box to commemorate the singer's 25th career anniversary.

Two singles were released from the album. On August 22, 2007, Avex Trax released the double A-side single featuring "Free Free" and "Super Music Maker". The physical editions of the single included alternative mixes of each track, as well as an additional DVD format containing the music video for "Free Free". The song received favourable reviews from music critics, but it peaked at number 32 on the Oricon Singles Chart. "Potential Breakup Song" was the album's second single, released on November 28, 2007. The physical versions included both the album track "Feel the Beat" and various mixes of the single. It received positive reviews but peaked at number 34 on the Oricon Singles Chart. Both singles sold less than 10,000 units in Japan.

== Reception ==
The Japanese music magazine CDJournal gave the album a positive review, citing songs "Free Free," "Feel the Beat," and "New Days" as standouts. Furthermore, the magazine felt Dolce portrayed a more "colourful" version of the singer. Dolce was not as commercially successful as her previous releases. In Japan, the album debuted at number 26 on the Oricon Albums Chart, selling 7,071 units in its first week. It spent four weeks on the chart and sold a total of 10,835 units. According to Oricon, it is Suzuki's lowest-charting studio record, and her lowest-selling studio album.

== Track listing ==
Dolce tracklist
No.	Title	Lyrics	Arrangement	Length
1.	"Free Free" (joins Yasutaka Nakata)	Yasutaka Nakata	Yasutaka Nakata	5:08
2.	"Feel The Beat" (joins Sugiurumn)	Sugiurumn	Sugiurumn	5:32
3.	"Potential Breakup Song" (joins Aly & AJ)	Alyson Michalka; Amanda Michalka; Antonina Armato; Tim James; Fumihito Morita; Ami Suzuki	Sugiurumn	3:54
4.	"Bitter..." (joins S.A.)	Sachiko Shimada	S.A.	5:07
5.	"Sweet Dance" (joins Ram Rider)	Ram Rider	Ram Rider	4:58
6.	"The Weekend" (joins Captain Funk)	Sachiko Shimada	Captain Funk	6:26
7.	"Super Music Maker" (Yasutaka Nakata)	Nakata	Nakata	5:01
8.	"Music" (joins Ram Rider)	Ram Rider	Ram Rider	4:19
9.	"Stereo Love" (joins Tomoe Shinohara)	Tomoe Shinohara	Shinohara	3:49
10.	"Ai no Uta (アイノウタ)" (Rocketman feat. You The Rock)	Rocketman; You The Rock	Tetsuto Yoshida	3:31
11.	"Futari wa Pop (2人はPOP)" (joins Hoff Dylan)	Yuhi Komiyama	Hoff Dylan	4:01
12.	"Atarashii Hibi (新しい日々)" (joins Yo-King)	Yo-King	Ikoman	3:50
Total length:				59:22

Limited edition bonus track
No.	Title	Lyrics	Arrangement	Length
13.	"If"	Ami Suzuki	Masaya Suzuki	3:50

DVD tracklist
No.	Title	Length
1.	"Bitter..." (Music video)
2.	"Behind The Scenes"

Vinyl tracklist
No.	Title	Lyrics	Arrangement	Length
1.	"Free Free" (joins Yasutaka Nakata)	Nakata	Nakata	5:08
2.	"Feel The Beat" (joins Sugiurumn)	Sugiurumn	Sugiurumn	5:32
3.	"Bitter..." (joins S.A.)	Shimada	S.A.	5:07
4.	"Sweet Dance" (joins Ram Rider)	Ram Rider	Ram Rider	4:58
5.	"The Weekend" (joins Captain Funk)	Sachiko Shimada	Captain Funk	6:26

== Charts ==
Chart (2008)	Peak position
Japanese Albums (Oricon)	26

== Release history ==
Region	Date	Format(s)	Label	Ref.
Japan	February 6, 2008	CD; DVD; vinyl	Avex Trax; Rhythm Republic	
Various	N/A	Digital download; streaming	Avex Trax	
