= Meg (singer) =

Japanese singer, songwriter and model

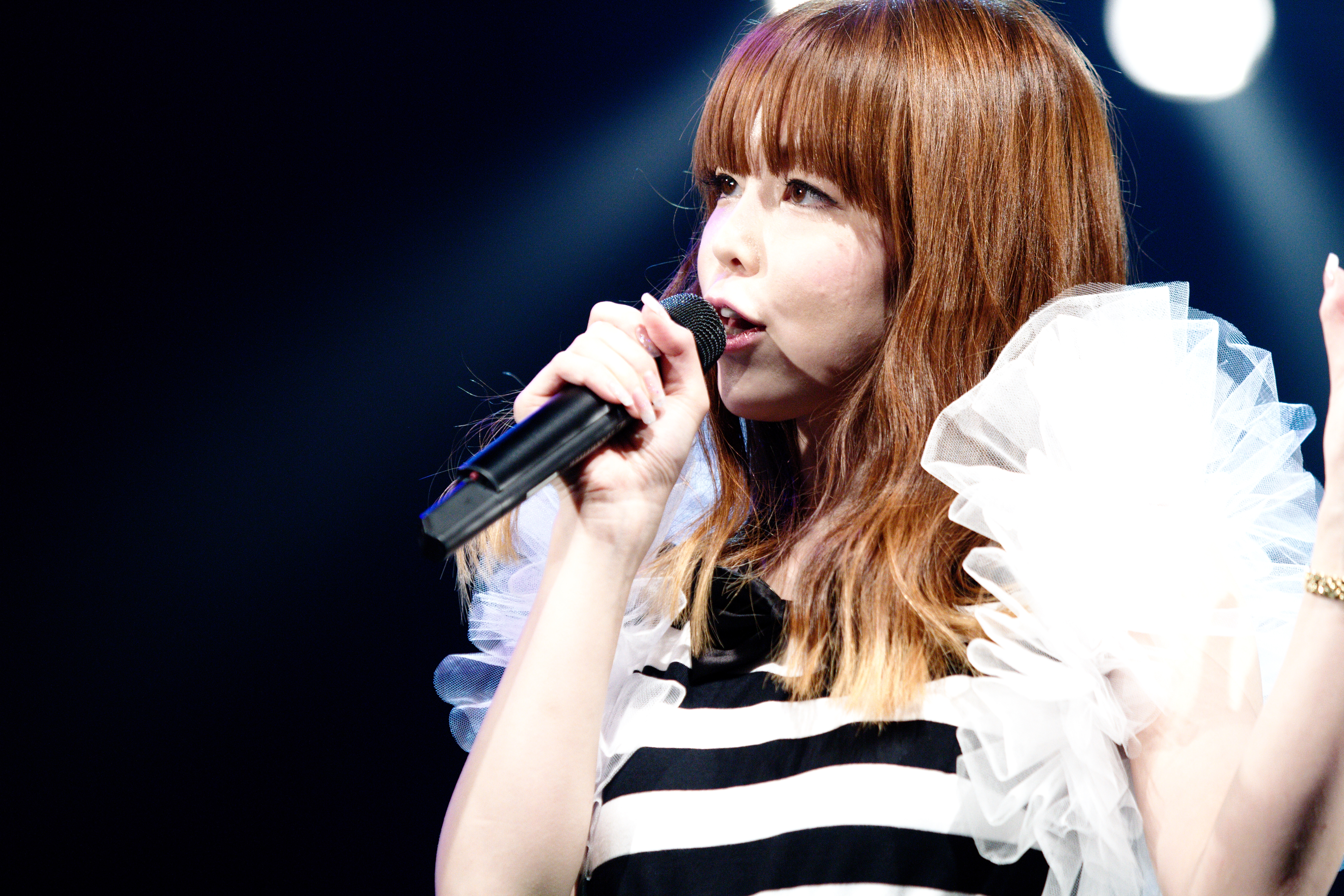
- Meg live at Japan Expo 2011 in Paris
- Occupations: Singer; songwriter; record producer; model; fashion designer
- Agents: Sylph Creation Unborde Artista; Asobisystem
- Children: 1
- Musical career
- Genres: J-pop; EDM; synthpop; pop rock; electronica
- Years active: 2001–present
- Labels: Burger Inn; Shampoo Nine; LSN; Dream Machine; Unborde; Universal J; Starchild

Meg; born October 3, 1980), stylised in all caps, is a Japanese recording artist, record producer, model and fashion designer from Hiroshima Prefecture, Japan. She is signed with Starchild Records, a division of King Records. Between 2003 and 2013 she created over a dozen albums and two dozen singles. She started a fashion brand called "Cheryl" in 2004, and both a cosmetic brand, "baw," and a restaurant, café Maison de Ruban, in 2014.

== Biography ==
Meg made her singing debut in July 2002 with the song "傘としずく (Kasa To Shizuku)", which she produced herself and arranged by CMJK. The single was an indie single released under Burger Inn Records.

She made her transition to a major label, Warner Music Japan, with the single "Scanty Blues", which was composed by Yasuyuki Okamura. During production Meg and Okamura disagreed on the arrangement of the song, which caused him to stop working on it, and Meg recruited techno producer Ubar Tmar to finish the song as she wanted it. The finished "Scanty Blues" took on an acid techno-influenced, house-like sound, while Okamura's own rock arrangement of the song was included as the B-side. Nevertheless, her next single was a cover of Okamura's song "Ikenai Koto Kai".

In 2003, Warner Music commissioned Third Ear Recordings to produce a remix album for Meg, "mgrmx", which featured artists such as Theo Parrish and Christ.; this album became Meg's first work to be released outside of Japan as it also received an LP release in Europe.

In the summer of 2004, Meg started a new fashion brand called "Cheryl", which followed on from the work she did on her previous brand, "mgcloset". Items by Cheryl were stocked in Klein-Mart Tokyo, a store launched and directed by Meg specifically for the purpose of selling Cheryl designs, but which also stocked homewares, accessories, and vintage and imported fashion.

In January 2006, she changed the official capitalization of her stage name from "meg" to "MEG". In the same year, Cheryl was rebranded as "Carolina Glaser by Cheryl", introducing men's designs. She opened another storefront to sell the new brand, the Carolina Glaser Boutique.

Her third studio album, Aquaberry, reached number 1 on the pop albums chart on the Japanese upon its release and managed to sell higher than her previous album Dithyrambos. The album did not produce any singles.

Meg began working with producer Yasutaka Nakata in 2007 and released her ninth single, "Amai Zeitaku", in May 2007, switching to the electropop genre. She has since worked with other producers, including the new rave English band Hadouken! for her 14th single, "Freak", and the Shanghai Restoration Project for a mini album titled Journey.

Meg's 2008 album Step became her best-selling album in her career, peaking at number 8 in the Oricon chart, selling 29,048 units, making it the second technopop album to reach the Oricon Top Ten since Perfume's Game, which debuted at number one.

Her sixth studio album, Beautiful, was released on May 27, 2009, and also has reached the Oricon Top Ten. Her seventh full studio album, Maverick, was released on June 23, 2010, once again featuring production and songwriting work by Yasutaka Nakata.

In July 2010, Meg wrote in her blog informing fans that she would be leaving Universal Music Japan and travelling to Paris for a break. She would release the single "Passport/Paris" and a compilation album titled Best Flight with her label before going on indefinite hiatus. On a May 2012 interview with Natalie.mu, Meg revealed that some of the reasons of her going on hiatus was the quick production of Yasutaka Nakata on her album Maverick, completing the album for just three weeks, and that she realized that she did not take much time on the lyrical content of the songs and added that the album is leaning towards more "pop" than club music, in which she considered a "fast pace" on the album's production.

In 2011, she returned to Warner Music, under the management of the newly launched Unborde Records label. Starting June 20, 2011 Meg began releasing digital singles only available in the French iTunes Store. Her fourth digital single, "Rouge No Dengon", was originally supposed to be released on September 26, 2011, but due to issues getting it onto the iTunes France Store, it was delayed and released on September 27 instead.

Two singles, "Kiss or Bite" and "Save", were announced in April 2013 and marked Meg's first dual single release. They were released together in a special package and as separate releases on June 5, 2013. The tracks from the two singles were created with a unified narrative involving a love story with post-apocalyptic and horror themes. The release was also accompanied by a set of seven trading cards and a browser game called "Meg the World." The browser game was designed with a pixel art style evocative of fourth generation video games and featured chiptune versions of songs from the two singles, while dialogue in the game elaborated upon the themes found in the songs' lyrics. These themes would later be used on the following studio album, Continue, which was released on December 4, 2013.

Since 2014, she focused on business by her own cosmetic brand "baw", and also the café Maison de Ruban, a café she opened inspired by her time spent in London.. Both businesses have now closed.

== Discography ==
=== Albums ===
Year	Title	Genre	Label	Oricon album charts	Sales	Producer
2003	Mgrmx	Electronic dance	—	—	300	Kouichi Tsutaya
2003	Room Girl	Pop	Dream Machine	87	4,000	Yasuyuki Okamura, CMJK, Nobuhiko Kashihara, Meg
2006	Dithyrambos	Pop	Shampoo Nine	291	800	Meg
2007	Aquaberry	Indie electronic	AZ Tribe, Rainbow	139	2,000	Nakamura Hiroshi
2007	Beam	J-pop/electropop	Universal J	24	29,000	Nakata Yasutaka
2008	Step	J-pop/electropop	Universal J	8	29,000	Nakata Yasutaka
2009	Beautiful	J-pop/electropop	Universal J	10	18,000	Nakata Yasutaka
2009	Journey	Indie electronic	Universal J	38	6,000	Shanghai Restoration Project
2010	Maverick	J-pop/electropop	Universal J	20	8,000	Nakata Yasutaka
2010	Best Flight	J-pop/electropop/ electronica/pop-rock	Universal J	22	7,000	Nakata Yasutaka, Hadouken!, Shanghai Restoration Project, Zentarou Watanabe
2012	La Japonaise	Pop	Starchild, King	60	2,000	Nakata Yasutaka, Shanghai Restoration Project, The Telephones, various
2012	Wear I Am	Pop	Starchild, King	36	3,000	Nakata Yasutaka, taku (M-Flo), Yasuyuki Okamura, various
2013	Continue	Pop	Starchild, King	80	—	TeddyLoid, Masaru Yokoyama, Tomoki Hasegawa, various

==== Singles ====
Year	Title	Peak (Oricon)	Peak (Billboard)	Sales	Album
2001	"Kasa To Shizuku" (傘としずく)	—	—	—	Room Girl
2002	"Scanty Blues" (スキャンティブルース, Sukyanti Burūsu)	—	—	—	Room Girl
2002	"Ikenai Kotokai/Kasa to Shizuku" (イケナイコトカイ/傘としずく)	84	—	4,000	Room Girl
2003	"Kōro" (光露)	156	—	700	Room Girl
2003	"Groove Tube"	131	—	1,400	Room Girl
2004	"Stereo04"	—	—	—	Dithyrambos
2006	"Rockstar" ^{1}	—	—	—	Dithyrambos
2006	"Dawn" ^{1}	—	—	—	Dithyrambos
2007	"Amai Zeitaku" (甘い贅沢) ^{1}	183	—	600	Beam
2007	"OK"	43	—	8,000	Beam
2008	"Magic"	42	—	4,000	Step
2008	"Heart"	26	62	6,000	Step
2008	"Precious"	17	49	8,000	Beautiful
2009	"Freak"	21	—	5,000	Best Flight
2010	"Secret Adventure"	44	—	2,400	Maverick
2010	"Passport/Paris"	75	—	1,600	Best Flight
2012	"Trap"	34	—	3,000	Wear I Am
2013	"Kiss or Bite"	72	—	—	Continue
2013	"Save"	73	—	—	Continue

===== Digital singles =====
- "Discothèque / Banana no Namida" (June 20, 2011)
- "Ma Mélissa (covered from Les Minikeums)" (July 25, 2011)
- "Believe" (August 29, 2011)
- "Rouge no Dengon" (September 27, 2011)
- "Still Love Her (Ushinawareta Fuukei)" (October 31, 2011)
- "Tough Boy" (November 28, 2011)

=== Other appearances ===
Year	Song	Artist	Album
2008	"Hikyou no Oku no Ushi no Kioku" (秘境の奥の虫歯の記憶)	Ukawanimation!	N/A
2008	"Denwa" (電話)	Suneohair	Birthday
2008	"Wish You Smile"	Sound Around	Sweet Music
2009	"Lyricist"	Towa Tei	Big Fun
2009	"Haruka" (遥)	Ryukyudisko, iLL	Pleasure, ∀
2009	"When You Wish Upon a Star"	Meg × Q;indivi	House☆Disney
2012	"Hijitsuzai Boy" (非実在ボーイ)	Ram Rider	Audio Galaxy: Ram Rider vs Stars!!!
2020	"Stay with Me"	Ram Rider	N/A
