= Can't Stop the Disco =

- CD Cover

Single by Ami Suzuki

from the album Supreme Show
- B-side: "Climb Up to the Top"
- Released: September 24, 2008
- Recorded: 2008
- Genre: Dance-pop; techno
- Length: 5:26
- Label: Avex Trax
- Songwriter: Yasutaka Nakata
- Producer: Yasutaka Nakata

Ami Suzuki singles chronology
"One" (2008)	"Can't Stop the Disco" (2008)	"Reincarnation" (2009)

Alternative cover

"Can't Stop the Disco" (stylized as "can't stop the DISCO") is a song recorded by Japanese recording artist Ami Suzuki for her seventh studio album, Supreme Show (2008). It was written and produced by Japanese producer and Capsule member Yasutaka Nakata. The track is Suzuki's third single with Nakata after her June 2008 single "One". "Can't Stop the Disco" premiered on September 24, 2008, as the second single from the album.

Musically, the track was described as a dance and techno song. The lyrics describe freedom on the dance floor, amongst other themes. Upon its release, "Can't Stop the Disco" garnered positive reviews from music critics and was praised for its composition and commercial appeal. It also achieved lukewarm success in Japan, peaking at number 17 on the Japanese Oricon Singles Chart and 47 on the Billboard Japan Hot 100 chart. As of March 2016, "Can't Stop the Disco" has sold over six thousand units in Japan alone; this is Suzuki's only single to reach five thousand sales.

The accompanying music video for "Can't Stop the Disco" was shot in Tokyo; it features Suzuki in several different four-by-four rooms, all centering around Suzuki's fashion and video props. The music video became notable for displaying another change in Suzuki's persona and is cited as an example of her numerous "reinventions". For additional promotion, the song was featured on Suzuki's One Promotional Tour and at her 29th birthday event.

== Background and release ==
"Can't Stop the Disco" was written, produced, composed and arranged by Japanese musician and Capsule member Yasutaka Nakata. Nakata was not credited as the single's featuring artist where it was first introduced on Suzuki's double a-side single "Free Free" and "Super Music Maker" (2007). It is Suzuki's fourth single to be handled by Nataka, following "Free Free", "Super Music Maker", and "One". It was selected as the second and final single from Supreme Show, and was released on September 24, 2008, by Avex Trax.

The Maxi CD of the single contains the A-side "Can't Stop the Disco", the B-side track "Climb to the Top", and a remixed version of "Super Music Maker" subtitled "S/A '08 mix", with all three appearing connected seamlessly as a DJ mix. The DVD format of the single includes the radio edit music video of "Can't Stop the Disco"; both CD and DVD formats are mixed in a non-stop format and tracked. The cover sleeve features Suzuki in a purple and pink lit room, posing in the corner with the song's title on the wall. The CD and DVD formats have different poses of Suzuki. The CD format was used as the digital EP cover for the iTunes Store and Amazon.com. The cover sleeve is placed at the back of the jewel case, with the front cover featuring a booklet with a different photo.

== Composition ==
"Can't Stop the Disco" was recorded mid 2008 by Nakata at Avex Studio in Tokyo, Japan, and was co-distributed by Nakata's label Contemode, owned by Avex and Yamaha in Japan. "Can't Stop the Disco" was described as a dance-pop song with numerous musical elements, including techno and club music. Throughout the entire song, Suzuki's vocals are processed with autotune and vocoder post-production work. Tetsuo Hiraga from Billboard's Hot Express magazine compared the "club" sounds and production to Suzuki's previous single "Free Free", feeling that both songs displayed "full energy" and "dynamism" through Suzuki. The lyrics to "Can't Stop the Disco" describe the freedom on the dance floor, and being able to meet a range of different people.

== Critical response ==
"Can't Stop the Disco" received favorable reviews from most music critics. A staff reviewer from CD Journal commended the composition of the track, labeling it "cool". The reviewer sound that the techno-pop influence "enhanced" the coherency of the sound. An editorial review on the Japanese Amazon.com website was positive in their review, commending the "upper and delicate club sound". The reviewer concluded that the song was a "welcome" return to dance music. An editorial review on the Japanese HMV website commended Suzuki's move to dance music, saying that Suzuki has now "challenged the club scene". Hiraga gave the song a mixed review on Hot Express, stating that while "Can't Stop the Disco" presented an "outrageous" and "pounding" club sound, he found it inferior to Suzuki's previous singles with Nakata.

== Commercial performance ==
"Can't Stop the Disco" debuted at number 17 on the Japanese Oricon Singles Chart, selling over 4,600 units in its first week of sales. This became Suzuki's highest-charting single, alongside "One" and her 2006 single "Alright!" since "Fantastic" (2006). The song lasted four weeks on the singles chart, her longest spanning single alongside "One" since "Alright!" with five. The song remains her only single to reach the top 20 and sold over 6,000 units in Japan, her only release to reach that sales limit. "Can't Stop the Disco" debuted and peaked at 37, 54 and 47 on the Billboard Japan Hot Singles Chart, Billboard Japan Radio Songs, and the Japan Hot 100. It dropped to ninety-eight on the Hot Singles Chart, and fell off the following week on the Radio Songs and Japan Hot 100 chart.

== Music video ==
A scene from the music video for "Can't Stop the Disco" features Suzuki inside a room with silver silk wallpaper.

The accompanying music video for "Can't Stop the Disco" was shot in Tokyo. The video opens with several circles moving across the screen, each of the circles featuring images of Suzuki posing. The first verse opens with Suzuki standing inside a large circle, singing the song with close-up and body shots. The outfit Suzuki wears is exactly the same from the CD and DVD cover sleeves of the single. It moves onto Suzuki with a new outfit, dancing inside of four-by-four room with silver silk wallpaper. The pre-chorus has Suzuki in a dark blue room, wearing a black and white hoodie. By the first chorus, several scenes use different transition effects while Suzuki sings in different circles.

The second verse has Suzuki in the dark blue room again. By the pre-chorus, It then uses neon effects to immolate white objects; as a result, Suzuki's sunglasses and hoodie lights up. The final chorus finishes with transitions of different scenes from the video, including Suzuki in the silver room, standing inside of circles, and inside the dark blue room. The video ends with a close-up of Suzuki standing next to a large circle, and pans out.

An editor from Channel-Ai blog was positive towards the video's visual effects and Suzuki's fashion, stating "For this reason all her 2008 releases were produced by the electronic producer and capsule leader Yasutaka Nakata, where Suzuki reinvented herself as a disco queen." The editor concluded that "The media would portray Ami as the new fashion leader portraying the popular ero-kakoii style." The music video appeared on the DVD release of "Can't Stop the Disco", and the bonus DVD format of Supreme Show.

== Promotion and live performances ==
"Can't Stop the Disco" was used for two television commercials in Japan; a campaign for Mr. Donut and the Japanese television show Gyotekku, which was used as the ending theme song. "Can't Stop the Disco" made its first live premiere at Suzuki's One Party, which consisted live performances in celebration of Suzuki's 10th Anniversary of her career. The song was performed live at two club party events hosted by Suzuki: the 2008 Cruising Party, and a live performance at Club Asia. The live version was released on the limited edition DVD format for Supreme Show. "Can't Stop the Disco" was then performed again at Club Asia for a second hosting party by Suzuki; this live version was released on the bonus DVD format for Supreme Show. "Can't Stop the Disco" was included on the track list on one of Suzuki's concert tours; this being a concert for her 29th birthday, at the Liquidroom event. "Can't Stop the Disco" was placed in the middle section for both concerts. The Liquidroom live performance appeared on the bonus DVD format of Suzuki's extended play, Snow Ring (2013).

== Track listing ==
- Japanese CD single
1. "Can't Stop the Disco" – 5:24
2. "Climb to the Top" – 6:33
3. "Super Music Maker" (SA'08s/A Mix) – 5:16
- Japanese CD and DVD single
1. "Can't Stop the Disco" – 5:24
2. "Climb to the Top" – 6:33
3. "Super Music Maker" (SA'08s/A Mix) – 5:16
4. "Can't Stop the Disco" (music video)
- Digital EP
1. "Can't Stop the Disco" – 5:24
2. "Climb to the Top" – 6:33
3. "Super Music Maker" (SA'08s/A Mix) – 5:16

== Personnel ==
Credits adapted from the liner notes of Supreme Show.

- Ami Suzuki – vocals, background vocals
- Yasutaka Nakata – songwriting, composition, production, arrangement, management
- Avex Trax – Suzuki's management
- Contemode – Nataka's management
- Recorded by Nakata at Avex Studio, Tokyo, Japan

== Charts and sales ==
=== Daily and weekly charts ===
Chart (2012)	Peak position
Japan Daily (Oricon)	24
Japan Weekly (Oricon)	17
Japan Weekly (Japan Hot 100)	47
Japan Hot Singles Sales Weekly (Japan Hot 100)	37
Japan Radio Songs Weekly (Japan Hot 100)	54

=== Sales ===
Region	Certification	Certified units/sales
Japan (RIAJ)	None	6,357

== Release history ==
Region	Date	Format	Label
Japan	September 24, 2008	Digital download	Avex Trax
United States	September 24, 2008	Digital download	Avex Entertainment Inc.
Australia	September 24, 2008	Digital download	Avex Entertainment Inc.
New Zealand	September 24, 2008	Digital download	Avex Entertainment Inc.
Canada	September 24, 2008	Digital download	Avex Entertainment Inc.
United Kingdom	September 24, 2008	Digital download	Avex Entertainment Inc.
Germany	September 24, 2008	Digital download	Avex Entertainment Inc.
Ireland	September 24, 2008	Digital download	Avex Entertainment Inc.
France	September 24, 2008	Digital download	Avex Entertainment Inc.
Spain	September 24, 2008	Digital download	Avex Entertainment Inc.
Taiwan	September 24, 2008	Digital download	Avex Entertainment Inc.
Japan	September 24, 2008	CD single	Avex Trax
Japan	September 24, 2008	DVD single	Avex Trax
