= Tokyo Connection =

Studio album by Halcali
- Released: February 09, 2011
- Genre: J-pop, hip-pop, ska
- Label: Sony Music Entertainment Japan

Halcali chronology
Tokyo Groove (2010)	Tokyo Connection (2011)	Halcali no Okawari (2012)

Tokyo Connection is the first concept album and first mini-album by the female Japanese hip-hop unit Halcali. This album is described as a "sequel" to Tokyo Groove of the previous year, hence the title.

The concept for the album is Valentine's Day, White Day and falling in love. Halcali, again, features many artists and producers throughout the album, such as: electrocore unit 80kidz, Shibuya-kei veteran Maki Nomiya (ex-Pizzicato Five) and Japanese Ska group Your Song Is Good as the backing band.

The album's lead radio single "Giri Choco" had been performed live since 2007 at the duo's annual "Special Valentine Concert". This song also marks Halca and Yucali's first known production credit.

== Track listing ==
1. Roman Hikou ("浪漫飛行"; A Romantic Flight)
  - (Kome Kome Club cover. Performance by Your Song Is Good)
2. "Girl!Girl!Girl!"
  - (Produced by Takeshi Nakatsuka. Lyrics by Maki Nomiya.)
3. Giri Choco ("ギリチョコ")
  - (Written and produced by Halcali & Yosuke@Home. Featuring vocals by Yosuke@Home.)
4. "Superstitions"
  - Produced by Yusuke Tanaka. Lyrics by Junji Ishiwatari (ex-Supercar).)
5. "Hey My Melody"
  - (Produced by Hiroshi Nakamura (i-dep).)
6. Strawberry Chips (Sweet Blue Beat ver.) ("ストロベリーチップス (Sweet Blue Beat ver.)")
  - (Self-cover of the 2003 single, featuring Your Song Is Good.)
7. Marching March (80kidz Remix) ("マーチングマーチ (80kidz Remix)")
  - (Remixed & Produced by 80kidz)

== Tie-ups ==
- "Roman Hikou", was used as the theme for Sony's campaign for the camera line "Cyber-shot". Halcali recorded their own promotional video using the camera, documenting a recent trip they took together. Also used as the ending theme song to the TBS show "Aimai Na!" from October to December 2010. Also used as the commercial song for Nissan Motors.
