= One (Ami Suzuki song) =

2008 single by Ami Suzuki

- CD only artwork.

Single by Ami Suzuki

from the album Supreme Show
- B-side: "A Token of Love"
- Released: June 18, 2008
- Recorded: 2008
- Genre: Club; dance-pop
- Length: 5:37
- Label: Avex Trax
- Songwriter: Yasutaka Nakata
- Producer: Yasutaka Nakata

Ami Suzuki singles chronology
| "Potential Breakup Song" (2007) | "One" (2008) | "Can't Stop the Disco" (2008) |

Alternative cover

"One" (capitalized as "ONE") is a song recorded by Japanese recording artist Ami Suzuki for her seventh studio album, Supreme Show (2008). It was written and produced by Japanese producer and Capsule member Yasutaka Nakata. The track is Suzuki's third single with Nakata after her August 2007 single's "Free Free" and "Super Music Maker". "One" premiered on June 18, 2008, as the lead single from the album.

Musically, "One" was described as a dance and club song. The lyrics describes Suzuki's celebration of her career and music; it also emphasizes minor themes of love, happiness, partying, and relationships. Upon its release, the track garnered positive reviews from music critics and was praised for its composition and commercial appeal. It also achieved lukewarm success in Japan, peaking at number 17 on the Japanese Oricon Singles Chart and 47 on the Billboard Japan Hot 100 chart. As of March 2016, "One" has sold over eight thousand units in Japan alone.

The accompanying music video for "One" was shot in Tokyo; it features Suzuki inside of a club, surrounded by LED lamps and several club poles. The music video became notable for displaying another change in Suzuki's persona and is cited as an example of her numerous "reinventions". For additional promotion, the song was featured on Suzuki's One Promotional Tour, and at her 29th birthday event.

== Background and release ==
"One" was written, produced, composed and arranged by Japanese musician and Capsule member Yasutaka Nakata. Nakata was not credited as the single's featuring artist where it was first introduced on Suzuki's double a-side single "Free Free" and "Super Music Maker" (2007). It is Suzuki's third single to be handled by Nataka, following "Free Free" and "Super Music Maker". It was selected as the lead single from Supreme Show, and was released on June 18, 2008, by Avex Trax. "One" is to commemorate her 10th anniversary of her music career, and was released physically on July 2 that same year.

The maxi CD of the single contains the original composition and remix of "One", plus the album version and remix of "A Token of Love". The DVD format of the single includes the radio edit music video of "One". The CD cover sleeve has Suzuki laying down on a mirror, with several strips of neon light behind her. The DVD cover sleeve features Suzuki kneeling down in front of a wall of neon lights. The standalone CD cover was used as the digital EP cover for the iTunes Store and Amazon.com. The cover sleeve is placed at the back of the jewel case, with the front cover featuring a booklet with a different photo. Suzuki's name or the song's title are not placed on either the front or back of the case.

== Composition ==
"One"
A 25-seconds sample of "One". The song was described as a dance-pop song with numerous musical elements, including club music and electropop.

"One" was recorded in early 2008 by Nakata at Avex Studio in Tokyo, Japan, and was co-distributed by Nakata's label Contemode, owned by Avex and Yamaha in Japan. The song was described as a dance-pop song with numerous musical elements, including club music and electropop. Throughout the entire track, Suzuki's vocals are processed with autotune and vocoder post-production work; the delivery is from the intro chorus and end of the song. Tetsuo Hiraga from Billboard's magazine Hot Express compared the "club" sounds and production to Japanese trio Perfume, a project that Nakata has contributed and produced since 2008; Hiraga felt Suzuki's song and Perfume's work emphasized a similar "club" and "energy" sound and feeling. Wendy Roeltgen from Orient Extreme compared Suzuki's processed vocals to the work of Daft Punk, and compared the composition to the work of Kylie Minogue's eighth studio album Fever (2002). The lyrics describes Suzuki's celebration of her career and music; it also emphasizes minor themes of love, happiness, partying, and relationships.

== Critical response ==
"One" received favorable reviews from most music critics. David Hickey, who had written her extended biography at AllMusic, highlighted the song as an album and career stand out track. Wendy Roeltgen from Orient Extreme was positive in her review, labeling it a "fun" and "dance summer tune"; Roeltgen concluded that "One" presented "superior quality" to the likes of other Japanese musicians. Tetsuo Hiraga from Billboard's magazine Hot Express went on to discuss the quality of the song, and noted that her mini hiatus in 2007 "changed a lot" of her future music releases. Despite Hiraga feeling that Suzuki didn't provide enough "spirit" for the track and compared it to Perfume's work as well, he commended the club composition and production. An editorial review on the Japanese Amazon.com site complimented the composition of the track, labelling it "sparkling up-tempo tune". A staff reviewer from CD Journal was positive towards the song's composition and Nakata's production, labelling it a "sparkly" and "glistening" dance tune.

== Commercial performance ==
In Japan, "One" debuted at number 17 on the Japanese Oricon Singles Chart, selling over 5,100 units in its first week of sales. This became Suzuki's highest-charting single, alongside her 2006 single "Alright!" since "Fantastic" (2006). The song lasted four weeks in the singles chart, her longest spanning single since "Alright!" with five. The song was her first single to reach the top 20 since "Alright!" and sold over 8,000 units in Japan, her highest selling single since "Free Free" with 10,000 units. "One" debuted and peaked at 57 on Billboards Japan Hot 100, 67 on Billboards Japanese Radio Songs Chart, and 27 on the Billboard Japan Hot Singles Chart. The song spent a sole week on all three Billboard component charts, making this Suzuki's first single to fall out in all Japanese Billboard chart simultaneously.

== Music video ==
A scene from the music video for "One" features Suzuki dancing inside of a room filled with neon lights.

The accompanying music video for "One" was shot in Tokyo. The video opens with Suzuki singing while surrounded by several white lights. The first verse has several different angle shots of Suzuki singing in front of LED lights, dancing to the beat of the song. The pre-chorus shows a change of LED light colors, and includes several inter cut scenes of Suzuki pole dancing with facial jewelry on. The chorus features changing neon colors of blue, red, green, and yellow in the background, and has several close-up, body, and atmospheric shots of the room and Suzuki.

The second verse has five different shots of Suzuki in a pink dress, singing the song in a colorized 3D effect. Several club lights are overlapped with another shot of Suzuki dancing. The second chorus features several clones of Suzuki in the pink dress, standing in the shape of the song's title "One"; this scene uses the 3D effect. The final scenes finish with Suzuki in the room, as the lights turn off.

An editor from Channel-Ai blog was positive towards the video's visual effects and Suzuki's fashion, stating "for this reason all her 2008 releases were produced by the electronic producer and capsule leader Yasutaka Nakata, where Suzuki reinvented herself as a disco queen"; the editor concluded that "the media would portray Ami as the new fashion leader portraying the popular ero-kakoii style." The music video appeared on the DVD version of "One", and the bonus DVD format of Supreme Show.

== Promotion and live performances ==
For additional promotion, the song was featured on two of Suzuki's concert tours, and one television commercial. "One" was used as the ending theme song for the Nippon TV's series All Japan High School Quiz Championships. "One" made its first live premiere at Suzuki's One Party, which consisted of live performances in celebration of Suzuki's 10th Anniversary of her career beginning. The song was performed live on two club party events hosted by Suzuki: the 2008 Cruising Party, and a live performance at Club Asia; the performances appeared on the limited edition DVD format for Supreme Show. "One" was then performed again at Club Asia for a second hosting party by Suzuki; this live version was released on the bonus DVD format for Supreme Show. "One" was also included on the track list on one of Suzuki's concert tours; this being a concert for her 29th birthday, at the Liquidroom event. The Liquidroom live performance appeared on the bonus DVD format of Suzuki's extended play, Snow Ring (2013).

== Track listing ==
- Japanese CD single
1. "One" – 5:37
2. "A Token of Love" – 6:13
3. "One" (Instrumental) – 5:37
4. "A Token of Love" (FM88 Remix) – 4:20
- Japanese CD and DVD single
1. "One" – 5:37
2. "A Token of Love" – 6:13
3. "One" (Instrumental) – 5:37
4. "A Token of Love" (FM88 Remix) – 4:20
5. "One" (music video)
6. "One" (secret commentary video)
- Digital EP
1. "One" – 5:37
2. "A Token of Love" – 6:13
3. "One" (Instrumental) – 5:37
4. "A Token of Love" (FM88 Remix) – 4:20

== Credits and personnel ==
Credits adapted from the liner notes of Supreme Show.

- Ami Suzuki – vocals, background vocals
- Yasutaka Nakata – songwriting, composition, production, arrangement, management
- Avex Trax – Suzuki's management
- Contemode – Nataka's management
- Recorded by Nakata at Avex Studio, Tokyo, Japan

== Charts and sales ==
=== Daily and weekly charts ===
| Chart (2008) | Peak position |
|---|---|
| Japan Daily (Oricon) | 14 |
| Japan Weekly (Oricon) | 17 |
| Japan Weekly (Japan Hot 100) | 57 |
| Japan Hot Singles Sales Weekly (Japan Hot 100) | 27 |
| Japan Radio Songs Weekly (Japan Hot 100) | 67 |

=== Sales ===
| Region | Certification | Certified units/sales |
|---|---|---|
| Japan (RIAJ) | None | 7,899 |

== Release history ==
| Region | Date | Format | Label |
|---|---|---|---|
| Japan | June 18, 2008 | Digital download | Avex Trax |
| United States | June 18, 2008 | Digital download | Avex Entertainment Inc. |
| Australia | June 18, 2008 | Digital download | Avex Entertainment Inc. |
| New Zealand | June 18, 2008 | Digital download | Avex Entertainment Inc. |
| Canada | June 18, 2008 | Digital download | Avex Entertainment Inc. |
| United Kingdom | June 18, 2008 | Digital download | Avex Entertainment Inc. |
| Germany | June 18, 2008 | Digital download | Avex Entertainment Inc. |
| Ireland | June 18, 2008 | Digital download | Avex Entertainment Inc. |
| France | June 18, 2008 | Digital download | Avex Entertainment Inc. |
| Spain | June 18, 2008 | Digital download | Avex Entertainment Inc. |
| Taiwan | June 18, 2008 | Digital download | Avex Entertainment Inc. |
| Japan | July 2, 2008 | CD single | Avex Trax |
| Japan | July 2, 2008 | DVD single | Avex Trax |
