= Beautiful (Meg album) =

Studio album by Meg
- Released: May 27, 2009
- Recorded: 2008–2009 at Contemode Studio, Tokyo, Japan
- Genres: Electropop, dance-pop, electronica, hard house, experimental
- Length: 45:23 (CD); 19:41 (DVD)
- Labels: Universal J UPCH-1714 (CD); UPCH-9480 (CD+DVD)
- Producer: Yasutaka Nakata

Meg chronology
STEP (2008)	Beautiful (2009)	Maverick (2010)

Singles from Beautiful
- 1. "Precious" Released: September 17, 2008

Beautiful is the sixth full-length studio album by Japanese electropop singer-songwriter Meg, released by Universal J on May 27, 2009 in Japan It was released in two formats: as a CD-only version, and a limited edition CD+DVD version. The first press bonuses for the limited press DVD included four music videos, a photograph collection, two postcards, and special first press packaging, as well as an external bonus, a poster. This album, like Meg's last two albums, is produced by Yasutaka Nakata of capsule.

== Information ==
After the release of her fourth studio album, Step, Meg was reportedly back in the studio recording new material for future releases. Her 4th single under Universal Music J (13th overall), "Precious," was released on September 17, 2008. Produced by long-time collaborator Yasutaka Nakata, it became her most successful charting single on the Oricon Weekly Charts, charting at the 17th position. Afterward, Meg went on a brief break and recorded her one night show, "Meg Premium Live 'Party'" at the Shibuya-AX concert hall in Shibuya. This would later be released as a live DVD special on February 25, 2009.

On December 26, 2008, Meg's Universal website announced her 5th single under Universal Music J (14th overall), "Freak." Described by her website to have a "rockin'" new sound, this single marked a departure from her work with Nakata and she was instead produced by the English band Hadouken!. "Freak" was released February 11, 2009. On April 1, 2009, Beautiful was officially announced with track listings and a teaser cover on her official website, and on April 6, 2009, the album was officially announced on her Universal website, complete with covers, full track listings, details, and album samples.

== Track listing ==
=== CD ===
All lyrics written by Meg; all songs composed, arranged, and produced by Yasutaka Nakata.

No.	Title	Length
1.	"Days"	1:49
2.	"Precious"	4:29
3.	"Telephone"	5:29
4.	"Lies"	5:42
5.	"Star"	4:37
6.	"Stand"	4:45
7.	"Why"	5:52
8.	"Joker"	4:25
9.	"Skin"	4:54
10.	"Beautiful"	5:52

=== DVD ===
1. "Precious <Music Clip>"
2. "Freak ＜yasutaka nakata remix＞ <Music Clip>"
3. "Skin <Music Clip>"
4. "Beautiful <Music Clip>"

== Charts ==
Chart	Peak position
Oricon Daily Chart	6
Oricon Weekly Chart	10
