= La Japonaise (album) =

Studio album by Meg
- Released: April 25, 2012
- Recorded: 2010–2012
- Genre: J-pop, anison, electropop, synthpop
- Length: 47:28
- Label: Starchild, King
- Producer: Yasuharu Konishi, Tetsuya Komuro, The Shanghai Restoration Project, Yusuke Tanaka, The Telephones, Yasutaka Nakata, The Lowbrows, 2 'Anime'ny DJs, Keiichi Sokabe

Meg chronology
Best Flight (2010)	La Japonaise (2012)	Wear I Am (2012)

La Japonaise is the eighth studio album by Japanese recording artist Meg. It was released on April 25, 2012 through King Records.

== Background ==
With the theme of "songs that connect Japan and France", La Japonaise is Meg's first concept album, consisting only of Japanese anime theme songs. "Discotheque", "Banana no Namida", "Believe", "Rouge no Dengon", "Still Love Her" and "Tough Boy" had been previously released -in that order-, although exclusively in France through iTunes Store under the supervision of Warner Music Japan. Though the singles were released on Warner, this album was released through King Records' sublabel Starchild, making it her first release with the label.

== Track listing ==
No.	Title	Lyrics	Music	Producer(s)	Length
1.	"Discotheque" (Rosario + Vampire)	Ryoji Sonoda	Junpei Fujita	Yusuke Tanaka	3:21
2.	"Believe" (One Piece)	Chiroru Yaho	Groove Surfers	The Lowbrows	3:48
3.	"Tough Boy" (Fist of the North Star)	Tom	Tom	The Telephones	3:14
4.	"Wind" (Naruto)	Akeboshi	Akeboshi	The Shanghai Restoration Project	3:33
5.	"Banana no Namida (バナナの涙)" (High School! Kimengumi)	Yasushi Akimoto	Tsugutoshi Goto	Yusuke Tanaka	3:26
6.	"Motteke! Sailor Fuku (もってけ!セーラーふく)" (Lucky Star)	Aki Hata	Satoru Kōsaki	2 'Anime'ny DJs (Mito from Clammbo & Kensuke Ushio a.k.a. Agraph from Lama)	4:02
7.	"Still Love Her" (City Hunter)	Tetsuya Komuro	Komuro, Naoto Kine	Komuro	3:42
8.	"Volevo un Gatto Nero" (Norageki!)	Francesco Pagano, Mario Pagano, Armando Soricillo, Francesco Saverio Maresca	F. Pagano	Yasutaka Nakata (capsule)	3:08
9.	"Rouge no Dengon (ルージュの伝言)" (Kiki's Delivery Service)	Yumi Arai	Arai	Yasuharu Konishi	3:17
10.	"Comment te dire adieu" (Bonus track)	Jack Gold, Serge Gainsbourg	Arnold Goland Sous	Keiichi Sokabe	3:39
