= Ongaku no Susume =

Studio album by Halcali
- Released: November 24, 2004
- Genre: J-pop, hip-pop
- Label: For Life

Halcali chronology
Halcali Bacon (2003)	Ongaku no Susume (2004)	Halcali Mix (2005)

Ongaku no Susume (音樂ノススメ, Recommended Music) is the second album released by Japanese band Halcali. It peaked at number 24 on Oricon Albums Chart.

The original jacket was redesigned and re-released to celebrate the album passing the 100,000 sales mark.

== Track listing ==
=== CD ===
1. Introduction
2. "フワフワ・ブランニュー" (Fuwa Fuwa Brand New, Fluffy and Brand New)
3. "マーチングマーチ" (Marching March)
4. "ストロベリーチップス" (Strawberry Chips)
5. "晴れ時ドキ" (Hare Tokidoki, Sunny, Sometimes...)
6. Oboroge Copy View
7. History
8. "芝生 feat.谷川俊太郎" (Shibafu feat.Tanikawa Shuntaro, The Lawn)
9. "若草DANCE feat.宇多丸 (RHYMESTER)" (Wakakusa Dance feat. Utamaru (Rhymester), Fresh Grass Dance)
10. Baby Blue!
11. "伝説の2人" (Densetsu no Futari, The Legendary Duo)
12. "コンティニュード" (Continued, To Be Continued)
