= Step (Meg album) =

Studio album by Meg
- Released: June 18, 2008
- Recorded: 2008 at Contemode Studio, Tokyo, Japan
- Genre: J-pop, electropop, dance-pop, house, dance
- Length: 58:45
- Language: Japanese / English
- Label: Universal J
- Producer: Nakata Yasutaka

Meg chronology
| Beam (2007) | Step (2008) | Beautiful (2009) |

Singles from Step
- 1. ""Magic"" Released: March 5, 2008; 2. ""Heart"" Released: May 7, 2008

Step (stylized STEP) is the fifth full-length studio album by Japanese singer-lyricist Meg, released on June 18, 2008 in Japan by Universal Music Japan. This is Meg's highest selling album in her career as well as the second electropop album to reach the top ten in the Oricon charts since Perfume's Game (released two months prior), debuted and peaked at number 8 in the Oricon charts, selling 15,801 units on its first week of release and a total of 29,048 units in Japan.

== Track listing ==
All lyrics written by Meg; all songs composed, arranged and produced by Yasutaka Nakata.

| No. | Title | Arrangement | Length |
|---|---|---|---|
| 1. | "Magic" | Yasutaka Nakata | 4:11 |
| 2. | "Kittenish" | Nakata | 5:13 |
| 3. | "Make Love" | Nakata | 7:30 |
| 4. | "Prism Boy" | Nakata | 5:15 |
| 5. | "Heart" | Nakata | 3:42 |
| 6. | "Supersonic" | Nakata | 7:22 |
| 7. | "Searchlight" | Nakata | 4:32 |
| 8. | "Natalie" | Nakata | 6:25 |
| 9. | "Kittenish" (YNNK mix) | Nakata, Nishi-Ken | 5:52 |
| 10. | "Prism Boy" (extended mix) | Nakata | 8:41 |

=== DVD ===
1. Magic (PV)
2. Heart (PV)
3. Magic (Dance Clip)
4. Heart (Dance Clip <VJ Mix>)
