= Beam (album) =

Studio album by Meg
- Released: December 5, 2007 (Japan); January 4, 2008 (Taiwan)
- Recorded: 2007
- Studio: Contemode Studio, Tokyo, Japan
- Genre: J-pop, electropop, electronic rock
- Language: Japanese / English
- Label: Universal J
- Producer: Yasutaka Nakata

Meg chronology
Aquaberry (2007)	Beam (2007)	Step (2008)

Singles from Step
- 1. "Amai Zeitaku" Released: May 30, 2007; 2. "OK" Released: October 3, 2007

Beam (stylized as BEAM) is the fourth full-length studio album by Japanese singer and songwriter Meg, released on December 5, 2007 in Japan by Universal J. The album is produced by Capsule member Yasutaka Nakata of Perfume fame and is her first album under Universal Music. The album also is simultaneously released with Nakata's other effort with Capsule, Flash Back. The album debuted at number 24 in the Oricon Weekly Charts, selling 10,544 units on its first week of release. Beam was also released in Taiwan on January 4, 2008, and is her only album released in the country.

The album spans two singles: the independent limited release of "Amai Zeitaku" under Meg's now defunct label, Shampoo Nine records, and "OK", her debut single under Universal Music. Beam is Meg's second highest-selling album according to Oricon.

== Singles ==
=== "Amai Zeitaku" ===
"Amai Zeitaku" is Meg's ninth single, released on 30 May 2007 under Shampoo Nine Records, and the album's first single. This is her last release under the label before being signed to Universal Music Japan as well as her first single to be fully produced by capsule's Yasutaka Nakata. The single also features two b-sides: "Koi no Bakudan" which is a cover of a 1974 Anzai Maria song and an extended mix of the title track. The single charted at number 183 on the Oricon chart for only a week.

=== "OK" ===
"OK" is Meg's tenth single, released on 3 October 2007, and the second from the album. This was also her second major label debut single; first to be released by Universal Music Japan after the success of her previous single "Amai Zeitaku". The single reached number 43 on the Oricon chart, where it charted for seven weeks, selling 8,061 copies.

== Track listing ==
All songs produced by Yasutaka Nakata except tracks 9 (remixed and produced by Ajapai) and 10 (remixed and produced by DJ Clazzi).

No.	Title	Lyrics	Music	Arrangement	Length
1.	"Amai Zeitaku" (甘い贅沢)	Meg	Yasutaka Nakata	Yasutaka Nakata	6:01
2.	"In Your Eyes"	Meg	Nakata	Nakata	4:59
3.	"Girly Step"	Meg	Nakata	Nakata	4:37
4.	"Love Letter"	Meg	Nakata	Nakata	3:40
5.	"dreamin' dreamin"	Yasutaka Nakata	Nakata	Nakata	4:44
6.	"OK"	Meg	Koichi Tsutaya	Tsutaya, Nakata	4:14
7.	"Model"	Meg	Nakata	Nakata	7:20
8.	"Romantika"	Meg	Nishi-ken	Nakata	4:23
9.	"Love Letter" (Ajapai Remix)	Meg	Nakata	Ajapai (remixer, producer)	6:21
10.	"Girly Step" (Clazziquai Project Remix)	Meg	Nakata	DJ Clazzi (remixer, producer)	3:39
