= Halcali Bacon =

Studio album by Halcali
- Released: September 3, 2003
- Genres: J-pop, hip-hop
- Length: 42:36
- Language: Japanese
- Label: For Life

Halcali albums chronology
Halcali Bacon (2003)	Ongaku no Susume (2004)

Halcali Bacon (Japanese: ハルカリベーコン) is the debut studio album by the Japanese J-pop duo Halcali. It was released in September 3, 2003 by For Life Music. It reached number five on the Oricon chart in Japan, and stayed on the chart for 21 weeks, making it the debut album by a female hip-hop artist to enter the top ten in Japanese history. Halcali's debut album featured many well-known Japanese hip-hop producers as guests, as well. Drowned in Sound's Samual Rosean, in a 2018 article on Shibuya-kei, a micro-genre of Japanese pop combining very different styles, noted that in 2003, it was a "prominent release" (mixing shibuya-kei with "pop rap" and hip-hop), alongside releases by Plus-Tech Squeeze Box and Fantastic Plastic Machine.

== Album title meaning ==
“For our first album, HalCali Bacon, Fumiya from OTF had been overseas and told us about a breakfast he’d had with crispy bacon.” says Yucali.“‘The Japanese for ‘crispy’ is ‘karikari’, so we call it karikari bacon. So when he said ‘karikari bacon’, it just clicked — karikari bacon became HalCali Bacon.”

== Track listing ==
=== CD ===
1. "Intro. Halcali Bacon"
2. "タンデム" (Tandem)
3. "ギリギリ・サーフライダー" (Girigiri Surf Rider)
4. "嗚呼ハルカリセンセーション" (AhAh Halcali Sensation)
5. "おつかれSUMMER" (Otsukare Summer, Good Job This Summer)
6. "ハルカリズム "CANDY HEARTS"" (Halcalism "Candy Hearts"/Halcali Rhythm "Candy Hearts")
7. "Conversation of a Mystery"
8. "Peek-A-Boo"
9. "Hello, Hello, Alone"
10. "スタイリースタイリー" (Stylee Stylee)
11. "エレクトリック先生" (Electric Sensei, Electric Teacher)
12. "続・真夜中のグランド" (Tsuzuki, Mayonaka no Grand, Continued: Schoolyard in the Middle of the Night)
