= Maverick (Meg album) =

Studio album by Meg
- Released: June 23, 2010
- Recorded: 2010
- Studio: Contemode Studio, Tokyo, Japan
- Genre: J-pop, electropop
- Length: 38:51
- Label: Universal J
- Producer: Yasutaka Nakata

Meg chronology
| Beautiful (2009) | Maverick (2010) | Best Flight (2010) |

Singles from Maverick
- 1. "Secret Adventure" Released: April 26, 2010

Maverick is the seventh studio album by Japanese electropop singer-songwriter Meg, released in Japan on 23 June 2010. This was her last original studio effort with Yasutaka Nakata as producer. Released in Japan on June 23, 2010, it peaked at number 20 on the Oricon chart in its chart debut, and stayed on the chart for four weeks in total. One single was released from the album, Secret Adventure. Released on April 28, 2010, it reached number 44 on the Oricon chart, where it charted for two weeks.

== Track listing ==
All song titles are originally written in all caps and are all romanized. All lyrics by Meg; all tracks composed, arranged, and produced by Yasutaka Nakata.

| No. | Title | Length |
|---|---|---|
| 1. | "N07B" (ja: en-zero-nana-bi) | 0:15 |
| 2. | "Gray" | 3:56 |
| 3. | "Destination" | 4:30 |
| 4. | "Hanabi" (en: firework) | 3:52 |
| 5. | "Moshimo" (en: if) | 2:32 |
| 6. | "Groovy" | 4:22 |
| 7. | "You" | 4:22 |
| 8. | "Secret Adventure" | 3:13 |
| 9. | "Our Space" | 3:25 |
| 10. | "Story" | 3:59 |
| 11. | "Maverick" | 4:30 |
