= Shanghai Restoration Project =

US musical group

The Shanghai Restoration Project
- Origin: New York City
- Genres: Hip hop, electronica, experimental, trance
- Years active: 2006–present
- Label: Undercover Culture Music
- Members: Dave Liang, Sun Yunfan
- Website: www.shanghairestorationproject.com

The Shanghai Restoration Project (SRP) is a contemporary electronic music duo formed in New York City, consisting of Chinese American artists Dave Liang and Sun Yunfan.

== Background ==
Producer Dave Liang was born in Lawrence, Kansas and grew up in Upstate New York. He started learning classical piano at an early age but transitioned towards jazz after hearing Miles Davis' "So What" in high school. He attended college at Harvard and upon graduation moved to NYC to start a part-time music production career while working as a consultant. In 2003, Liang began apprenticing with Ryan Leslie, "learning his way around drum machines and mixing desks and devouring a history of hip-hop that he had missed the first time around." After some initial success (he sold his first song to R&B singer Carl Thomas) he found the major label system challenging as a producer and launched the Shanghai Restoration Project.

Multi-disciplinary artist Sun Yunfan was born and raised in China. She started learning classical piano and dance training at the age of nine. After receiving her art education from School of Visual Arts and Pratt Institute she started collaborating with SRP on album covers and music videos and gradually expanded into songwriting and music production. In 2015 she became a formal member of the band. With Sun's addition the group's style embarked on a new direction described as "genre-bending, border-traversing and retro-futuristic".

== Biography ==
SRP debuted as MSN Music's "New Artist of the Week" in January 2006. The release gained recognition globally, rising to the top 10 in several electronic charts, including Amazon and iTunes. The first track from the debut album, "Introduction (1936)", was selected as the theme song for a worldwide TV advertising campaign for Kenzo Parfums (a division of Louis Vuitton) in early 2007. Later that year, SRP partnered with China Record Corporation to release Remixed and Restored Vol. 1, a project remixing select classic Chinese hits from 1930s Shanghai.

In 2008, SRP's Instrumentals: Day & Night, a 24-song soundtrack for modern day Shanghai, was featured on NPR. Several songs were regularly featured during BBC's coverage of the Beijing Olympics.

In 2009, SRP visited Sichuan, China with Abigail Washburn to create a folk-electronic record called Afterquake to raise awareness for victims of the Sichuan earthquakes. The two artists partnered with Sichuan Quake Relief and discussed their work on NPR All Things Considered, The San Francisco Chronicle, and NY Times.

In 2010, SRP partnered with the Chinese creative community site Neocha to release eXpo, a compilation of Chinese electronic artists that was highlighted in The Fader, Wired.com, and PRI's The World.

In 2011, SRP released Little Dragon Tales, a collection of classic Chinese children's songs set to electronic and hip-hop beats. The album was recommended by Jeff Yang as the "year’s best culture-savvy stocking stuffer" in the Wall Street Journal. Songs from the album were also featured on compilations released by Starbucks and Putumayo. That same year, Liang began collaborating with multimedia artist Sun Yunfan, first on music videos and live visuals and eventually on songwriting and music production.

In 2014, SRP released The Classics, a collection of 1930s and 1940s Shanghai jazz standards remade in an electronic format. The album features vocals from Shanghai jazz vocalist Zhang Le and was featured on both NPR's All Things Considered and Last Call with Carson Daly. The group embarked on a multi-city tour of China and performed at the Smithsonian Folklife Festival and the Toronto's Harbourfront Centre.

In 2016, SRP released What's Up with That?, an electronic collaboration with Chinese animator Lei Lei and Life Elsewhere, an album with Chinese jazz singer Zhang Le. Life Elsewhere was the first album Liang co-produced with Sun Yunfan.

In 2017, SRP released R.U.R., which imagines a world in which AI has replaced humankind. Tthe group performed selections from the album on the Great Wall of China and Amsterdam Dance Event. The group also contributed music to the film Have a Nice Day, which premiered in competition at the Berlin International Film Festival.

In 2019, SRP released Flashbacks in a Crystal Ball, which Earmilk described as an album that "experiments with sound in ways not pursued by many artists."

In 2020, SRP released Brave New Symphony, which Pop Matters praised as "well-crafted electronic comfort for an increasingly digital age"

In 2021, the duo relocated to Barcelona.

In 2023, SRP released "Sketchbook 94," which won the Best Electronic Album at the 2024 Wave Music Awards (浪潮音乐大赏) hosted by Tencent Music. Two songs from this album are featured in Liu Jian’s film Art College 1994, which premiered in the main competition at the 2023 Berlin International Film Festival.

In 2025, SRP released "Tus Manos Pican" with percussionist Angelo Manhenzane.

In 2026, SRP released "Finding Bakoena in a SoJo Cloud" with rapper and dancer Tebza Majaivane aka Tebza Diphehlo. The group performed their collaboration at NYC's Lincoln Center and the WOMAD festival in the UK and Spain.

== Discography ==
=== Studio albums ===
- The Shanghai Restoration Project (2006, Undercover Culture Music)
- Instrumentals (2006, Undercover Culture Music)
- Story of a City (2008, Undercover Culture Music)
- Instrumentals: Day - Night (2008, Undercover Culture Music)
- Zodiac (2009, Undercover Culture Music)
- Expo with Neocha (2010, Undercover Culture Music & Neocha)
- Little Dragon Tales: Chinese Children's Songs (2011, Undercover Culture Music)
- Little Dragon Tales: Instrumentals (2011, Undercover Culture Music)
- Pictures in Motion (2013, Undercover Culture Music)
- The Classics with Zhang Le (2014, Undercover Culture Music)
- What's Up with That? with Lei Lei (2016, Undercover Culture Music)
- Life Elsewhere with Zhang Le (2016, Undercover Culture Music)
- R.U.R. (2017, Undercover Culture Music)
- Flashbacks in a Crystal Ball (2019, Undercover Culture Music)
- Brave New World Symphony (2020, Undercover Culture Music)
- "Sketchbook 94" (2023, Undercover Culture Music)
- "Tus Manos Pican" with Angelo Manhenzane (2025, Undercover Culture Music)
- "Finding Bakoena in a SoJo Cloud" with Tebza Majaivane (2026, Undercover Culture Music)

=== EPs and singles ===
- "Reinterpretations" (2006, Undercover Culture Music)
- "Remixed and Restored: Vol. 1" (2007, China Records)
- "Afterquake" with Abigail Washburn (2009, Afterquake Music)
- "A Summer Song" with Emi Meyer (2010, Curious Creature Records & Undercover Culture Music)
- "A Winter Song" with Emi Meyer (2010, Curious Creature Records & Undercover Culture Music)
- "New Tea" (2011, Undercover Culture Music)
- "In a Faraway Place" with Mimi Yu (2012, Undercover Culture Music)
- "sum of all things nini" with Neocha (2012, Undercover Culture Music & Neocha)
- "Breakdance of Yao" with Brittany Haas & Lily Henley (2013, Undercover Culture Music)
- "Mungbean Mash" with Zhang Le (2015, Undercover Culture Music)
- "I Don't Like the Comics You Drew" with Lei Lei (2017, Undercover Culture Music)
- "Dubalonia Radio International" (2018, Undercover Culture Music)
- "Public Poet" (2018, Undercover Culture Music)
- "A148" (2018, Undercover Culture Music)
- "Surf en Estado de Alarma" with Pixel de Stael (2021, Undercover Culture Music, Genio Equivocado)
- "Damballa Zing" (2024, Undercover Culture Music)
- "Dark Horse Reverve" (2024, Undercover Culture Music)
- "Jamestown Rolling" (2025, Undercover Culture Music)

== Other projects ==
The Shanghai Restoration Project has also produced releases for various artists including Japanese recording artist MEG, Yamaha J-pop artist Miu Sakamoto, electro pop artist Di Johnston, and Japanese jazz artist Emi Meyer.

MEG: Journey (Mini-Album 2009)

Miu Sakamoto: Phantom Girl (2010), Hatsukoi (2011), I'm Yours (2012)
