= Free Free =

- Artwork that commercializes "Free Free"/"Super Music Maker"

Single by Ami Suzuki joins Yasutaka Nakata

from the album Dolce
- B-side: "Super Music Maker"
- Released: August 22, 2007
- Recorded: June–July 2007; (Avex Studio, Tokyo, Japan)
- Genre: House
- Length: 5:11
- Label: Avex Trax
- Songwriter: Yasutaka Nakata
- Producer: Yasutaka Nakata

Ami Suzuki singles chronology
"Soremo kitto shiawase" (2007)	"Free Free" (2007)	"Potential Breakup Song" (2007)

Music video
- "Free Free" on YouTube

"Free Free" (stylized in all caps) is a song by Japanese recording artist Ami Suzuki and producer Yasutaka Nakata, taken from her sixth studio album Dolce (2008). It was released on August 22, 2007 through Avex Trax and was distributed into three physical formats and for digital consumption. Additionally, the track appeared as a double A-side to "Super Music Maker", another recording by Suzuki and Nakata. Suzuki first started working with the producer in late 2006 after her staff at Avex noticed the singers engagement with dance-oriented music whilst performing at night clubs, and wanted to pair her with a musician that dealt with electronic dance music.

Musically, "Free Free" is an electro house number which is inspired by 1980s pop and disco music. The lyrical content is sombre and based on the theme of longing for freedom, with erotica also inspiring the track's lyrics and Suzuki's image for the promotion. Backed by synthesizers and keyboards, Suzuki's vocals are heavily processed through tools such as autotune and vocoder.

Upon its release, "Free Free" received positive reviews from music critics, many whom commended Suzuki's new musical approach that included a mixture of electronic genres. Additionally, it was selected by some publications as one of her best moments in her career. Commercially, the single experienced moderate success on the Oricon Singles Chart, reaching number 32 and was present for four weeks. Despite this, Oricon tallied the sales and revealed it to be one of her highest selling releases after a string of unsuccessful comebacks.

In order to promote the track, an accompanying music video was released in July 2007; it depicted Suzuki in a small four-by-four room lit with LED lights and television screens bearing Nakata's face. Furthermore, she hosted a release party at Tower Records in Shibuya, and went on to performing the number at various events such as A-nation and other intimate gigs. Since its release, "Free Free" has been included on Suzuki's greatest hits compilation, Ami Selection (2011) and her EP Ami Suzuki Best Selection (2014).

== Background and production ==
In March 2007, Suzuki started her "join" project and released her fifth studio album Connetta, which featured a variety of collaborators and producers. Although it was noted for its experimental adaption of musical genres, Suzuki went on to perform club-oriented remixes and songs at night clubs around Japan. Her staff at Avex Trax, who attended her performances, noticed her engagement with club music and wanted to pair her with a musician that dealt with electronic dance music. Eventually, Avex contacted Japanese producer and Capsule member Yasutaka Nakata, in June 2007, to work with Suzuki on her next album, which he accepted. Suzuki was aware of Nakata's work prior to their collaboration, but because she felt her "join" project embraced musical styles from different collaborators, she intended to experiment in her sound with Nataka.

The singer and producer met each other during a small session as Nakata wrote down what Suzuki's feelings and ideas were for the track. After this, Nakata went straight to his home studio, Contemode, and started working on material. Eventually, Suzuki met with the producer at the same location, which she described "cozy", but decided to minimise the number of staff attending with her in order to work on the track intimately. Nakata recalled that once working on the material, he questioned whether it was "enough", to which Suzuki and her team gave ideas and would be surprised by the differences after each take.

"Super Music Maker", the singles's coupling track, was finished first with a demo tape, but "Free Free" was created without such a thing, with Nakata stating that he and Suzuki put "all their energy" into the final track. But during the process, having already started work with musicians such as Meg and Perfume, concurrent with his own band, that same year, Nakata only contributed to the two songs. Concerning the production, Suzuki commented that "[she] [wants] to put out a whole new view of the world" with the material on her then-upcoming album Dolce (2008).

== Composition ==
"Free Free"
A 25-seconds sample of "Free Free".

"Free Free" was written, composed, arranged, produced and recorded by Nakata himself. Musically, "Free Free" features a strong electro house arrangement with influences from 1980s pop and disco music. In a review by CD Journal, an editor agreed, and also noted the song's style as "80s nostalgic" and "ultra-pop". Conversely, Kyle from Arama Japan noticed its strong influence of house music, and branded it a "J-electro" track. The track was recorded with "Super Music Maker" between June–July 2007 at Nakata's home studio and Avex Studios in Tokyo, Japan, and was co-distributed by Nakata's record label Contemode, which was owned by Avex and Yamaha. Suzuki's vocals were processed with tools such as autotune and vocoder, all programmed and managed by Nakata. The lyrical content of the recording is based on longing for freedom. With that said, erotica is another factor that inspired the track's lyrics and Suzuki's image; she commented "the theme [of the track] is to sound erotic,". Credits provided by Oricon.

== Release ==
"Free Free" was released with "Super Music Maker" on August 22, 2007 through Avex Trax and Avex Entertainment Inc., and served as the lead single to her sixth studio record Dolce (2008). The single was distributed into three physical formats and for digital consumption. The first two physical formats—a normal compact disc and CD/DVD bundle—featured the two singles and their extended mixes, all produced by Nakata. Additionally, the latter included the music video to "Free Free". The digital release, which was promoted through Avex Entertainment Inc. globally, only included the single and the extended mix to "Super Music Maker". Seven days later, Avex's sub-label Rhythm Republic, issued a 12" inch record that included the extended mixes of both singles; only limited copies were available at the singer's official website.

The cover art to "Free Free"/"Super Music Maker" was photographed by Takashiro Akihisa, who also directed the accompanying music video for the song, and was revealed on July 18, 2007. There are three different artworks; the normal CD cover featured Suzuki kneeling down, whilst the DVD had her bending down with her back towards the camera. The artworks were placed on the back of the jewelcases, and the booklet featured another shot of her looking upwards; when opened, her bottom half is shown on the other side of the book. Additionally, Avex printed the booklets in a special lenticular paper that imitated the LED lights in the background of the photoshoot. This shot was then used as the official vinyl cover, tinted in pink. Taken from the video shoot, an editor for the website Sanspo compared the art to the work of Japanese recording artist Kumi Koda, where he/she described the shoot as "sexy". Another reviewer, reporting from Natalie.mu, commended its "decorative" lights and felt it expressed the song's "technopop" style.

== Reception ==
Upon its release, "Free Free" was well received by music critics, with many believing it to be one of Nakata's greatest musical efforts. An editor at Billboard Japan commended their collaboration, praising their execution on the sound and Suzuki's re-invention. Similarly, an article at Natalie.mu praised the song's "uptempo" tune and its "sparkling" effects. Another article by the same publication went onto appreciate Nakata's collaboration with the singer. Furthermore, in a review with CD Journal, he/she went onto praise Suzuki's vocals and the experimentation of electronic, house and dance music. He labelled it "super cool" and "good".

Kazuji Uemesu from Tower Records ran an article that detailed the release of Supreme Show—Suzuki's seventh album—and labelled the collaboration between the two "brilliant". In the album review, a member from the same magazine highlighted as one of Suzuki's best tracks, and called it an "explosive euphoria" that went onto emphasize the recording artists voice and sound. Japanese online retail store Technique gave the song a positive review, labelling it "catchy" and "dreamy". Kyle at Arama Japan called it "legendary", and believed it to be one of her greatest songs. A review at Gooume JP selected it amongst some of her best releases in her career.

Commercially, "Free Free" experienced minimal success in Japan. It debuted at number 1 on the daily Oricon Singles Chart, one of her highest peaks. After an entire week, it entered the weekly chart—dated September 3, 2007— at number 3 with 56,660 copies sold. This resulted into her first release to achieve over the 5,000 unit and her highest entry since 2006's "Like a Love?", which peaked at 13 and sold over 8,000 units. It fell to number 62 the following week, its final appearance inside the top 100 chart, and sold an additional 1,844 physical sales. Together, it lasted four weeks in the top 200 chart and sold 8,946 within its time, making it her highest selling single since the aforementioned track. According to Oricon's sales data base, they ranked "Free Free"/"Super Music Maker" as Suzuki's 21st best-selling single.

== Music video ==
The accompanying music video to "Free Free" was directed by Japanese movie maker Takashiro Akihisa. Talking to the Japanese magazine Hot Express, she commented that her idea was to convey her thoughts from what she created with the tune, into the visual; she identified that "sexy" and "cute" appeal was her go-to for the visual. Originally, Suzuki crafted plans to shoot the video for "Super Music Maker" instead, and had given the details of her proposed layout for the set to the director and to the executives at Avex Trax. However, Nakata believed that the ideas would have been portrayed better with "Free Free", and advised the singer to change her mind, which she did. As Suzuki walked into the set of the video, she revealed that the entire layout was exactly what she had in mind.

A scene from the music video "Free Free", which features Suzuki in a small room with lights; this scene emphasizes her "erotic" image as she lies on the ground in front of static televisions.

Several props included large screens and LED lights that were placed in a three-wall room (omitting the front wall in order to shoot the video). Suzuki explained that the scenery is not in fact "a night club", as she believed that it has "no story" and only works by the "feel-good" vibe of the song itself; however, she did note how the lights made it look like one. Nakata made a cameo appearance in the visual, appearing in the static televisions that were placed in the room. Length-wise, it took Akihisa one day to complete filming, with the entire crew and Suzuki spending majority of the entire day, and finishing at approximately 3am.

The visual opens with Suzuki's name, and the title "Free Free", superimposed on several LED lights. It follows with the singer standing in the room, but only dim-lit to show her figure in front of the lights. The first verse has the singer laying down on a large platform, covering a screen of LED lights, and sings to the camera. She dances and sings the track in the room—taken with long shot and face-up directions—whilst posing next to a couple of TV screens that features Nakata's face. As the chorus plays, the scene with her in the room is digitally manipulated, showcasing several overlapping techniques to show a blurry-like vision. She returns to lying on the ground during the bridge section, and the final chorus has her dancing in the room.

Several inter-cut scenes have Suzuki dancing in front of a green screen that duplicates to make five clones of herself, in front of LED lights. Additionally clones are added into a kaleidoscopic scene, and the video ends with Suzuki standing in the middle of the room as the lights turn red. The singer's visual premiered on Yahoo! Music Japan. According to Sanspo, Suzuki's "sexy" and "erotic" appearance in the video was heavily reported by Japanese publications and noted similarities between her and label mate, Japanese musician Kumi Koda. The finished video was promoted in media as "ero-pop", with Suzuki feeling it expressed the "sexiness" of Nakata Yasutaka's music and her own "pop" image. Additionally, the official clip and the "behind-the-scenes" were added onto her DVD compilation Join Clips (2008).

== Promotion ==
In order to promote the track, Ami Suzuki appeared at several intimate and live shows throughout Japan. She first performed the track at a hosting party at Tower Records in Shibuya, Tokyo, were only selected purchases of the physical formats included a lottery ticket. That same year, she sang the song at the 2007 and 2008's A-nation in Kanto region. In the latter year, Suzuki sung the song twice at Club Asia; the first where she was also promoting her then-new single "One", and the second being a promotional campaign for her seventh studio album Supreme Show (2008). She made an appearance at Duo Music Exchange in Shibuya, to commemorate her anniversary; she listed "Free Free" as the event's opening track. The following year, she made an appearance to the 2009 A-nation concert in August, where she placed "Free Free" as the opening number.

In 2010, Suzuki performed the song at several concerts such as her anniversary—two dates—and a return to A-nation. As part of her 29th birthday celebration, she included the track on her Liquid Room concert on February 9, 2011. To further promote "Free Free", Avex Trax and Suzuki herself had conducted several activities such as interviews and appearances. Avex first changed the entire layout of Suzuki's website in late-August 2007 to the artwork of "Free Free"; according to Natalie.mu, it depicted a "sexier" approach to the singer and was praised for the layout. In 2015, the singer released a rhythm game titled "Ami Suzuki Shake"; "Free Free" was one of the recordings added to the game. Since its release, "Free Free" has been included on Suzuki's greatest hits compilation, Ami Selection (2011) and her EP Ami Suzuki Best Selection (2014).

== Track listing and formats ==
CD single

1. "Free Free" – 5:11
2. "Super Music Maker" – 7:25
3. "Free Free" (Extended mix) – 7:37
4. "Super Music Maker" (Radio edit) – 5:06

DVD single

1. "Free Free" – 5:11
2. "Super Music Maker" – 7:25
3. "Free Free" (Extended mix) – 7:37
4. "Super Music Maker" (Radio edit) – 5:06
  1. "Free Free" (Music video)

12" record

1. "Free Free" (Extended mix) – 7:37
2. "Super Music Maker" – 7:25

Limited Dolce 12" record

1. "Free Free" – 5:11
2. "Feel the Beat"
3. "Bitter..."
4. "Sweet Dance"
5. "The Weekend"

== Credits and personnel ==
Credits adapted from the liner notes of the single's CD and DVD release.

Recording and management

- Recorded by Yasutaka Nakata at Contemode Studios and Avex Studios between June–July 2007 in Japan.

Credits

- Ami Suzuki – vocals, background vocals
- Yasutaka Nakata – songwriting, composing, producing, arranging, programming, background vocals
- Takashiro Akihisa – photographer, video director

== Charts and sales ==
=== Oricon charts ===
Chart (2007)	Peak position
Japan Daily Chart (Oricon)	1
Japan Weekly Chart (Oricon)	3

=== Sales ===
Region	Certification	Certified units/sales
Japan (RIAJ)	—N/a	8,946

== Release history ==
Region	Date	Format	Label
Japan	August 22, 2007	CD; DVD; digital download	Avex Trax
Japan	August 29, 2007	12" record	Rhythm Republic
Australia	September 2009	Avex Entertainment Inc.	digital download
New Zealand	September 2009	Avex Entertainment Inc.	digital download
United Kingdom	September 2009	Avex Entertainment Inc.	digital download
Ireland	September 2009	Avex Entertainment Inc.	digital download
Germany	September 2009	Avex Entertainment Inc.	digital download
France	September 2009	Avex Entertainment Inc.	digital download
Spain	September 2009	Avex Entertainment Inc.	digital download
Taiwan	September 2009	Avex Entertainment Inc.	digital download
