= Supreme Show =

- DVD and streaming cover (promoted by Avex Trax)

Studio album by Ami Suzuki
- Released: November 12, 2008
- Recorded: April–September 2008
- Studio: Avex Studios
- Genre: Club; dance; disco; electronic
- Length: 56:00
- Language: Japanese; English
- Label: Avex Trax
- Producer: Yasutaka Nakata

Ami Suzuki chronology
Dolce (2008)	Supreme Show (2008)	Blooming (2011)

Singles from Supreme Show
- 1. "One" Released: June 18, 2008; 2. "Can't Stop the Disco" Released: September 24, 2008

Supreme Show is the seventh studio album by Japanese singer Ami Suzuki. Avex Trax distributed it in CD and DVD formats on November 12, 2008. It was released ten months after her previous studio album, Dolce, and was promoted to commemorate the singer's tenth career anniversary. Yasutaka Nakata, who had previously appeared as a featured artist and produced on Dolce, handled the album in its entirety. Crafted to re-invent her sound and image, Supreme Show is an electronic album with additional dance notes, and includes tracks in English and Japanese language.

Commercially, Supreme Show had moderate success. In Japan, it peaked at number 16 on the Oricon Albums Chart, her highest-charting album since Around the World (2005). Nevertheless, it sold more than 13,000 units in the region. Avex Trax promoted the album with two singles, "One" and "Can't Stop the Disco," which received moderate success in Japan. In addition, she began two birthday-themed concert shows in Japan, as well as performing as a disc jockey in various clubs across the country. In addition, she performed at A-Nation live shows throughout Japan.

== Background and development ==
Suzuki released Dolce, her sixth studio album, on February 8, 2008. It was the second and final instalment in her "Join" collaborations, in which she collaborated with a number of producers while crediting them as featured artists. Compared to her previous efforts, the album did not perform as well commercially, only reaching the top forty of Japan's Oricon Albums Chart and becoming her worst-performing studio album. Furthermore, the majority of the album's singles did not perform well. Despite the album's poor performance, Suzuki continued to work on new music, with reports of a new album surfaced in September of that year.

Suzuki confirmed that he would release another studio in 2008, titled Supreme Show. According to Suzuki, she wanted to "re-invent" herself for the new album, so Avex Trax enlisted Japanese producer Yasutaka Nakata to help create music. Suzuki stated in an interview with The Japan Times, "I was wondering what kind of music would fit me now, and as I searched, I realised that house and electro really fits me." She later discussed Nakata's involvement with the record and her feelings about her new music style, stating; “People may wonder which form is the one I enjoy the most, or which one fits me best, but at this time I can say with confidence that this electro style is great for me."

Nakata, who also produced songs for Dolce, oversaw the entire album; he was listed as Supreme Show's sole producer, composer, and arranger, with Suzuki co-writing the song "Love Mail". Additionally, Max Matsuura served as executive producer. The majority of the album was recorded in various studios throughout Tokyo, Japan, where Nakata mixed and mastered it. Supreme Show is a club-oriented disco album with dance music and electronic elements. Michael Poole compared the album to that of Australian singer Kylie Minogue, believing it to be her "comeback" album. Furthermore, Suzuki provided "robotic" vocals on some of the tracks, and some songs ("Ten," "Climb to the Top") were performed in English.

== Promotion ==
Two singles were released from the album. On June 18, 2008, Avex Trax released the lead single, "One". The physical editions of the single included the album track "A Token of Love" and mixes of both songs, as well as an additional DVD format containing the music video for "One". The song received favourable reviews from music critics, and peaked at number 17 on the Oricon Singles Chart, and three Billboard Japan charts: 47 on the Japan Hot 100, 27 on the Hot Singles Sales, and 67 on the Radio Songs. "Can't Stop the Disco" was the album's second single, released on September 24, 2008. The physical versions included both the album tracks "Climb to the Top" and "Super Music Maker". It also received positive feedback and reached number seventeen on the Oricon Singles Chart, 47 on the Hot 100 chart, 37 on the Hot Singles Sales, and 54 on the Radio Songs.

She also promoted the album by hosting One Party, a promotional event that included live performances in honour of Suzuki's 10-year career anniversary. Suzuki performed "One" on the annual 2008 A-nation concert tour of Japan. Suzuki worked as a disc jockey on the Club Asia DJ tour, which was documented on the album's DVD versions. In addition, she hosted two birthday-themed shows in Shibuya, Tokyo, during which she performed the majority of the album's tracks; "Climb to the Top" was a pole dancing performance. The following year, she expanded the tour to her Ami Suzuki Anniversary show.

== Release and reception ==
Supreme Show was released in Japan by Avex Trax on November 12, 2008, in a variety of formats. The album was released on CD, with two DVD versions available: the standard edition, which included music videos for "One" and "Can't Stop the Disco," as well as Suzuki's DJ performance at Club Asia, and a second DVD, which included performances at Cruising Party and Club Asia. The first-press editions included a card sleeve and a bonus poster. Avex Trax later released the album in digital and streaming formats. Takaki Kumada, a Japanese photographer and designer, captured all four cover sleeves for Supreme Show, while Masaru Yoshikawa designed the booklet and photo shoot.

The Japanese music magazine CDJournal gave Supreme Show a positive review, praising the albums sound and Nakata's involvement; the reviewed labeled the album "refreshing". The album's commercial performance was moderate. In Japan, the album debuted at number 16 on the Oricon Albums Chart, selling 8,748 copies in its first week, making it her first top twenty album since Around the World (2005). It spent four weeks on the charts and sold 13,094 copies, slightly more than her previous albums. Supreme Show debuted at number 24 on the Billboard Japan Top Albums Sales Chart, becoming the fifth highest entry that week. It fell to 66 in its second charting week, but remained in the top 100 for two weeks in total.

== Track listing ==
All songs written and composed by Yasutaka Nakata, except "Love Mail" was co-written by Suzuki.

Supreme Show track list
No.	Title	Length
1.	"Ten"	4:58
2.	"Can't Stop the Disco"	5:24
3.	"Climb up to the Top"	6:33
4.	"Super Music Maker" (SA'08S / A mix)	5:16
5.	"Mysterious"	4:34
6.	"Change My Life"	3:29
7.	"Love Mail"	5:07
8.	"A Token of Love"	6:09
9.	"True"	4:45
10.	"Flower"	4:10
11.	"One"	5:35
Total length:		56:00

DVD track list
No.	Title	Length
1.	"One" (music video)
2.	"Can't Stop the Disco" (music video)
3.	"The First DJ Play at Club Asia"

Mu-mo-exclusive DVD track list
No.	Title	Length
1.	"Cruising Party"
2.	"Live performances at Club Asia"

== Personnel ==
Personnel details were sourced from the Distance liner notes booklet.

- Ami Suzuki – vocals, background vocals, song writing
- Yasutaka Nakata – song writing, producing, composing, arranging, engineer, mixing, recorded by
- Takuji Koga – A&R
- Masaru Yoshikawa – art direction, design
- Masahiro Nakawaki – art direction
- Max Matsuura – executive producer
- Takaki Kumada – album photography
- Yoshihiro Seki – promotion supervisor
- Avex Trax – Suzuki's record label and management
- Avex Entertainment Inc. – Suzuki's distribution label
- Contemode – Nakata's distribution label, co-rights

== Charts ==
Chart (2008)	Peak position
Japanese Albums (Billboard Japan)	24
Japanese Albums (Oricon)	16

== Release history ==
Region	Date	Format(s)	Label	Ref.
Japan	November 12, 2008	CD; DVD	Avex Trax	
Various	N/A	Digital download; streaming	Avex Trax	

== See also ==
- Ami Suzuki discography
