= Yasuyuki Okamura =

- Born: 岡村靖幸; 14 August 1965 (age 61); Kobe, Japan
- Origin: Japan
- Genres: Pop, rock, dance-pop
- Occupations: Singer, songwriter, record producer, model
- Years active: 1985–present
- Labels: Epic Sony Japan, Def Jam Japan, V4 Records, Space Shower Music
- Website: okamurayasuyuki.info/info/

Yasuyuki Okamura (Japanese: 岡村靖幸, Hepburn: Okamura Yasuyuki; born 14 August 1965) is a Japanese singer-songwriter and music producer. He has also used the name Eitarō Isono (磯野栄太郎, Isono Eitarō). He started his professional career in 1985, and is known internationally for the City Hunter 2 ending theme "Super Girl", and the Space Dandy opening theme "Viva Namida". In December 2023, he formed the duo Okamura Kazuyoshi (岡村和義) with Kazuyoshi Saito.

== Biography ==
Yasuyuki Okamura was born in Kobe, Japan in 1965, the oldest of two children. His father worked for Air France, and as a result, his family moved frequently throughout Japan, resulting in rotating through seven elementary and junior high schools. He attended Niigata Higashi High School and formed his first band there, but dropped out in 11th grade to pursue a musical career while working part-time at the nightclub Hacoban. After sending out numerous demo tapes and doing composing work for other artists, he was signed by Epic Sony in 1986.

He was highly successful in the late 1980s and early 1990s, first promoted as a teen idol. Okamura also claimed during this time that he was most inspired by the singers Seiko Matsuda and Prince. He starred in the film Peach: I'll Do Anything For You (Peach-どんなことをしてほしいのぼくに, Peach: Donna koto o shite hoshii no boku ni) with Kahori Fujii and Kazuhiko Kanayama. In 1996, he retreated from the media and performing, and started to focus more on producing other artists, including Meg and Chara.

Okamura was arrested in 2003 for possession of stimulant drugs, but released after pleading that they were necessary as a medicine. His record contract with Epic Sony was terminated by the company, and he was later signed by Universal. In April 2005, he was arrested for attempting to use cocaine in a Shibuya record store bathroom, and sentenced to two years in prison. When returning in 2007, Okamura started a comeback visually similar to his 1980s look, but was arrested on 5 February 2008 for possession of crystal meth. He was sentenced to two years in prison, and returned to live in Tokyo in 2010. He began releasing demos on his official Myspace.

In 2011, Okamura began an official tour again and released the two-part self cover album, Etiquette Pink and Purple. He returned to producing other artists and touring, and began to speak openly about becoming fully sober. In 2013, he released his first single in six years, "Viva Namida", which was revealed to become the opening theme to Shinichiro Watanabe's Space Dandy. In the music video for this single, an anime version of Okamura dances and sings along with the Space Dandy cast. In 2014 he toured Japan.

On 25 December 2023, it was announced that Okamura had formed the duo Okamura Kazuyoshi with Kazuyoshi Saito. One of impetuses for the group was when Saito appeared on Okamura's NHK Radio 1 radio show Okamura Yasuyuki no Come On Everybody in January 2020 and the two improvised a song together on the spot. "I Miss Your Fire" was released digitally on 17 January 2024, and was followed by "Haru, Hakudaku" on 14 February, which is based on the improvised song from 2020. Their first album, Wakaba, was released on 16 May. Their first tour began on the same day and saw them play 12 shows in eight cities. Okamura Kazuyoshi won Best Collaboration at the 2024 GQ Men of the Year Awards.

== Discography ==
=== Singles ===
- Out of Blue (1986)
- Check Out Love (1987)
- Young oh! oh! (1987)
- Dog Days (1987)
- Ikenai Kotokai (1988)
- SUPER GIRL (1988)
- Bible (1988)
- Daisuki (1988)
- Love Tambourine (1989)
- Yujin no Furi (1989)
- Peach Time (1990)
- Doonacchattendayo (1990)
- Ano Ko Boku ga Long Shot Kimetara Donna Kao suru Darou (1990)
- Kahlua Milk (1990)
- Tarzan Boy (1991)
- Parachute Girl (1992)
- Charm Point (1995)
- Peach X'mas (1995) (reissues on 1996 & 1998)
- Harenchi (1996)
- Sex (1999)
- Mayonaka no Cycling (2000)
- SexeS (2000)
- Marshmallow Honeymoon (2001) (feat. Captain Funk)
- Mon-Shiro (2004)
- Miracle Jump (2004)
- Hakkiri Motto Yuukan ni Natte (2007)
- Viva Namida (2013)
- Ai wa Osharejanai (2014)
- Kareshi ni Natte Yasashikunatte (2014)
- Love Message (2015)
- Shonen Saturday (2019)

=== Collaboration Single ===
- Tokyo Ontou – Tokyo Rhythm (2015, featuring Kitsu Shigeri)
- Step Up LOVE (2017, as DAOKO x Okamura Yasuyuki)
- Sudden Spark (2026, Yasuyuki Okamura X Kento Nakajima)

=== Studio albums ===
- Yellow (1987)
- DATE (1988)
- Yasuyuki (1989)
- Home Tutor (1990)
- Forbidden Life (1995)
- The Album (2003, with Takkyu Ishino)
- Mei-imi (2004)
- Koufuku (2016)
- Misao (2020)

=== "Best of" albums ===
- Precocious (1990)
- OH! Best (2001)

=== Self-cover/remix albums ===
- Business (2005)
- Etiquette Pink & Purple (2011)

== Visual style ==
Yasuyuki Okamura's most recognizable symbol in Japan is the Peach Mark, a distinct heart-peace sign-happy face hybrid, usually coloured pink. It appears prominently on the cover of his third album, Yasuyuki. It has since then been used in a wide variety of media, including merchandise, concerts, and music videos, with occasions where Okamura will use the Peach Mark in lieu of his name on promotional materials. Variant Peach Marks from the early 2000s have tongues sticking out.

Okamura is also known for his split use between colourful surrealism and minimalism, with the covers of Home Tutor (a bright collage featuring horses, water, an enormous child, an African-American angel, and himself) and Me-imi (a single green Peach Mark with a long tongue) as the best examples respectively.

== Feature film ==
Yasuyuki Okamura was the star of the 1989 film Peach: I'll Do Anything For You (Peach-どんなことをしてほしいのぼくに, Peach: Donna koto o shite hoshii no boku ni). It originally premiered in select theatres in 1989, before being released on video in 1990. Seven tracks from Okamura's first three albums, along with several exclusive instrumental arrangements, make up the soundtrack. It was directed by Isaku Sakanishi with a screenplay written by Kyoji Matsumoto. The film received mixed to positive reviews, with criticism directed towards the casual, "ad-libbed" nature of the film, while many Okamura fans enjoyed it for the same reason.

The story follows Yasuyuki, an amateur musician living alone in Tokyo, supported by an allowance from his parents. He doesn't go to college or have a steady job, but instead spends his days travelling through Tokyo with artist Eriko (Kahori Fujii) and punk pizza delivery boy Kinta (Kazuhiko Kanayama). Yasuyuki cannot figure out his place in the world, or what he truly wants. One day, the group runs into a man who turns out to be Eriko's fiancé, and it is revealed that Eriko is actually from a wealthy elite family. She leaves with the man, and seems to disappear, with rumours circulating that she's going to marry him in South America after graduation. The trio breaks up, and it's up to Yasuyuki to search for his friends, and his own purpose in life.

== Collaborations ==
- Misato Watanabe
  - GROWIN' UP (1985 compose, chorus)
  - すべて君のため (1985 compose)
  - Lazy Crazy Blueberry Pie (1985 compose, arrangement, chorus)
  - Bye Bye Yesterday (1985 compose)
  - Long Night (1986 compose)
  - 素敵になりたい (1986 compose, chorus)
  - 19才の秘かな欲望 (1986 compose)
  - Resistance (1986 compose)
  - 悲しき願い (Here&There) (1986 compose)
  - みつめていたい (Restin' In Your Room) (1986 compose)
  - A Happy Ending (1986 compose)
  - Lovin' You (1986 compose)
  - Half Moon (1986 compose, arrangement, chorus)
  - シャララ (1988 compose)
  - 19才の秘かな欲望 (The Lover Soul Version) (1988 compose)
  - 跳べ模型ヒコーキ (1989 compose)
  - 冷たいミルク (1989 compose)
  - 虹をみたかい (1989 compose, arrangement)
  - 虹をみたかい (Honey-bee Version) (1990 compose, arrangement, chorus)
  - 虹をみたかい (tokyo mix) (1990 compose, arrangement, chorus)
  - はだかの気持 (1991 compose, arrangement, chorus)
  - 泣いちゃいそうだよ (1992 compose)
  - ジャングルチャイルド (1993 compose, chorus)
  - BIG WAVEやってきた (1993 compose)
  - 若きモンスターの逆襲 (1993 compose, chorus)
  - さえない20代 (1993 compose)
- Kōji Kikkawa
  - Ubawareta Wink (1986 compose)
- Masayuki Suzuki
  - Betsu no Yoru e 〜Let's go〜 (1986 compose)
- Makoto Kawamoto
  - Ai no Sainō (1996 compose, arrangement, chorus)
  - FRAGILE (2000 compose 磯野栄太郎と明記)
- Ayaka Nishida
  - どうなっちゃってるの どうだっていいんじゃない (1998 compose, arrangement)
- Michihiro Kuroda
  - Thrill Vacance (2000 compose)
- CHARA
  - Lemon Candy (2000 compose)
- MEG
  - Scanty Blues (2002 compose)
  - TRAP (2012 compose)
- SOPHIA
  - HARD WORKER (2002 arrangement, production)
- Demon Kakka
  - SING LIKE A HUG (2003 compose, arrangement)
- Atsushi Sakurai
  - SMELL (2004 compose, arrangement)
- Miho Asahi
  - Himitsu no Framboise (2004 compose)
- FREENOTE
  - Haruka e no Speed Runner (2004 compose)
- HALCALI
  - Strawberry Chips (2005 remix)
- Yakkun Sakurazuka
  - あせるんだ女子は いつも 目立たない君を見てる (2007 lyrics, compose, arrangement)
  - Chameleon Girl (2007 compose, arrangement)
- XA-VAT
  - NUMANS-ROXETTE by YASUYUKI OKAMURA (2010 remix)
- Yo Hitoto
  - Lesson (2012 compose, arrangement, production)
- Zainichi Funk
  - 爆弾こわい 岡村靖幸REMIX (2012 remix)
- Daoko
  - Step Up LOVE (ステップアップLOVE) 2017
