= Halcali =

Japanese musical duo

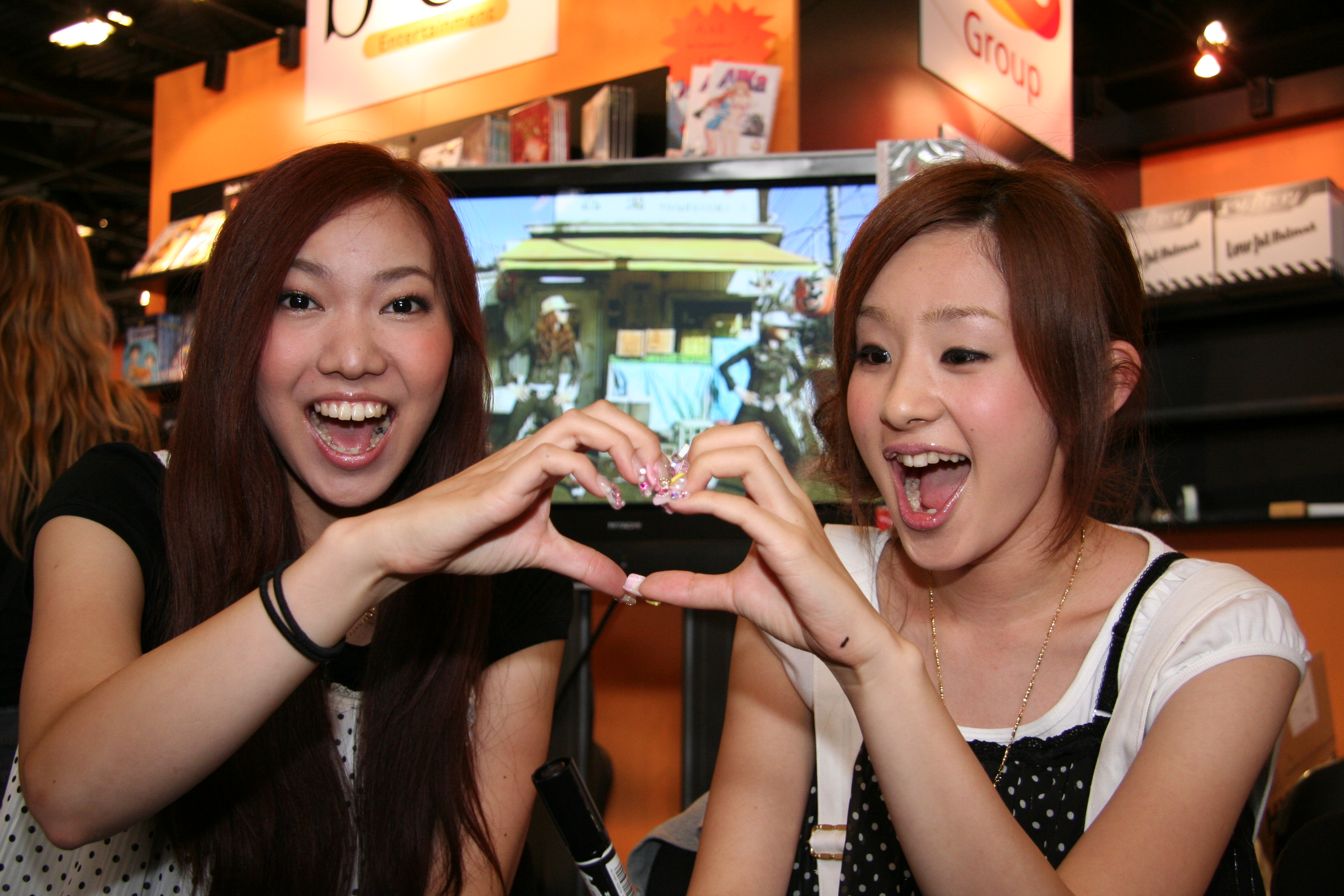
- Halcali at Japan Expo in 2007; Halca and Yucali

Background information
- Origin: Meguro, Tokyo, Japan
- Genres: J-pop; hip-hop; shibuya-kei; pop rap
- Years active: 2002–2013; 2024–present
- Labels: For Life; Epic
- Members: Halca; Yucali

Halcali (ハルカリ, Harukari; stylized as HALCALI) is a Japanese J-pop duo composed of Haruka and Yukari from Meguro, Tokyo. The group's name is a portmanteau of Halca (ハルカ, Haruka) and Yucali (ユカリ, Yukari). Their debut album, Halcali Bacon (2003), reached number five on the Oricon Albums Chart, making it the first album by a female hip-hop artist to enter the top ten in Japan.

Halcali made their American debut in May 2008 as musical guests of honor at the Anime Central convention; and performed in New York's Central Park on June 1, 2008 as part of a Japan Day festival.

After not renewing their contract with Epic Records Japan, the duo were largely inactive from 2013 until 2024. In 2024 their song "Otsukare Summer" (2003) (おつかれSUMMER, Otsukare Samā; literally "Good Job Summer") experienced a resurgence on TikTok; the renewed interest led their label, For Life, to reissue promotional material and release an animated music video in September 2025. The song's renewed success also coincided with surprise live appearances by Halcali at events in 2025, and For Life reactivated official accounts and reissued early singles in January 2026; "Otsukare Summer" also saw a re-release on March 2, 2026. They released a new single; "GUIN GUIN GUIN", on September 2, 2026.

== Creation ==
=== Pre-debut ===
Haruka and Yukari were close friends since elementary school and also attended the same local Meguro dance school. Both girls were only interested in becoming dancers in the future and had no aspiration to become singers. In 2002, Haruka and Yukari noticed a pink flier for an audition to become a "female hip hop unit" which was held by the group Rip Slyme. Among hundreds of entrants, Haruka and Yukari were chosen to form Halcali.

=== Debut ===
Halcali debuted at a free concert held by Rip Slyme at the Budokan theatre. There, Halcali performed with Rip Slyme and were introduced along with their debut single, "タンデム" (Tandem). "Tandem" was released on January 8, 2003 and was marketed on several Japanese television networks, along with MTV. The single entered into the Oricon Charts at position 19.

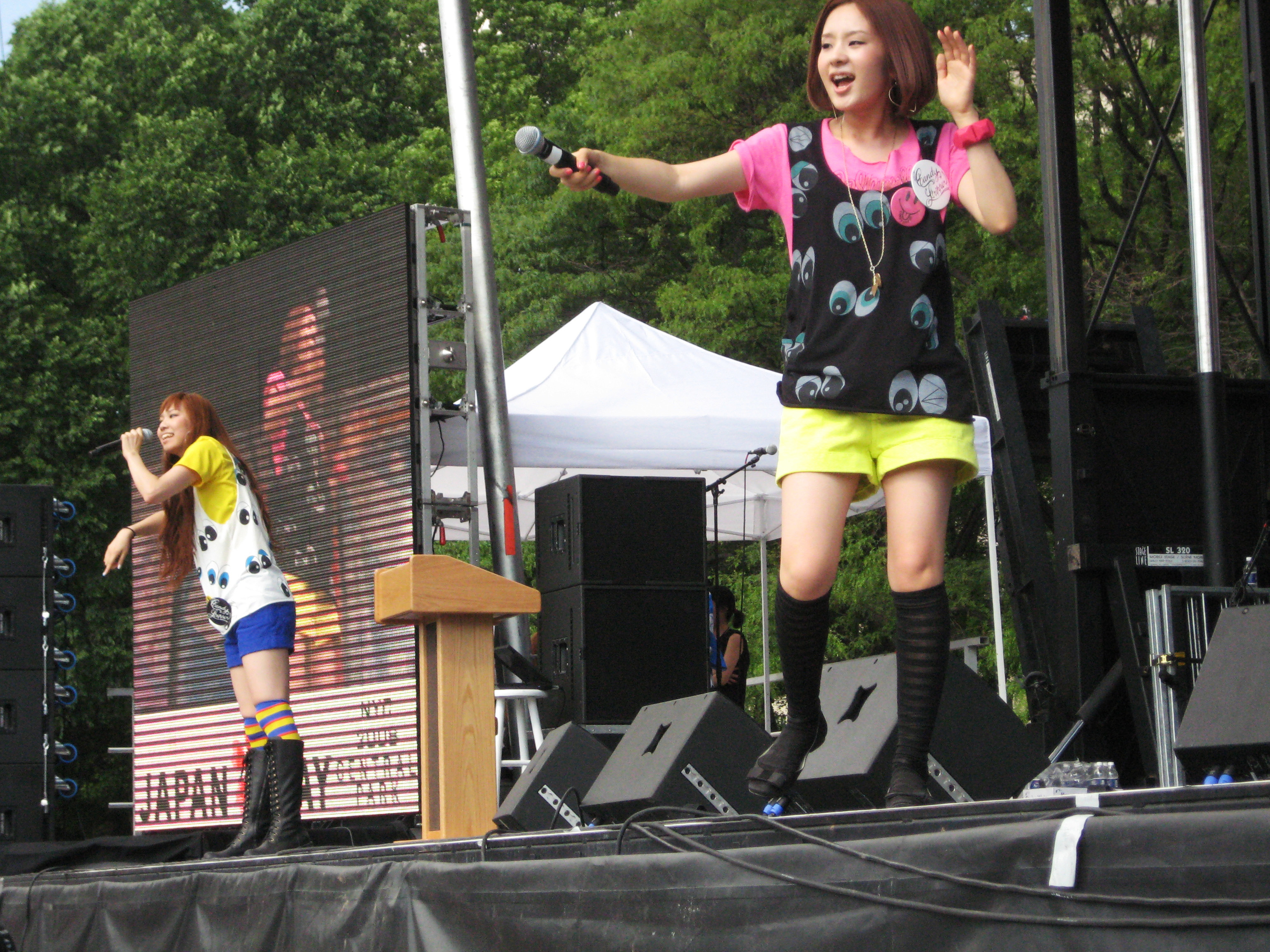
Halcali performing in Central Park during Japan Day 2008

The time between the release of their first single to that of their debut album Halcali moved away from mainstream J-pop and toward a style combining pop and rap; an airy, self-parody "bubblegum" rap in the vein of earlier groups such as East End X Yuri. This was evident in their second and third singles, "エレクトリック先生" (Electric Sensei) and "ギリギリ・サーフライダー" (Girigiri Surf Rider) released in mid-2003. Both singles focused on rap rather than pop.

The latter song attracted attention from Western audiences when it appeared on Adam and Joe Go Tokyo.

Halcali with DJ Kimjun performing at Anime Central in Chicago, May 16, 2008

== Discography ==
=== Studio albums ===
- Halcali Bacon (2003)
- Ongaku no Susume (2004)
- Cyborg Oretachi (2007)
- Tokyo Groove (2010)
- Halcali no Okawari (2012)

=== Singles ===
- "Tandem" (2003)
- "Electric Sensei" (2003)
- "GiriGiri Surf Rider" (2003)
- "Strawberry Chips" (2003)
- "Marching March" (2004)
- "Baby Blue!" (2004)
- "Tip Taps Tip" (2005)
- "Twinkle Star" (2006)
- "Look" (2006)
- "Tougenkyou / Lights, Camera. Action!" (2007)
- "It's Party Time!" (2007)
- "Long Kiss Good Bye" (2008)
- "Re:Yasashii Kimochi" (2009)
- "Konya wa Boogie Back" (2009)
- "Endless Night / YES" (2010)
- "You May Dream" (2010)
- "Roman Hikou" (2010)
- "GUIN GUIN GUIN" (2026)

=== Other charted songs ===
List of songs, with selected chart positions, showing year released and album name
| Title | Year | Peak chart positions | | | | | | Album |
| Title | Year | BRA Ja. | GER Ja. | SA Ja. | UK Ja. | US Ja. | WW Ja. Ex. JPN | Album |
|---|---|---|---|---|---|---|---|---|
| "おつかれSUMMER" | 2003 (Note: "おつかれSUMMER" did not chart until 2025.) | 11 | 12 | 7 | 4 | 2 | 8 | Halcali Bacon |
