= Ram Rider =

Japanese musical artist

- Born: 17 July 1978 (age 48)
- Origin: Japan
- Genres: J-pop, electronic music,
- Occupations: music producer, etc.
- Label: Rhythm Zone
- Website: ramrider.com

Ram Rider (RAM RIDER; Sato Katsuya?) is a Japanese music producer, musician, remixer, DJ.

== Biography ==
He grew up listening to YMO, EW&F, etc. under his father's influence from a young age, and discovered TM NETWORK when he was in elementary school. He was interested in synthesizers.

When he entered junior high school, he bought an MSX and a synthesizer and began composing music. He is influenced by various works both domestically and internationally, including Takkyu Ishino and Teitowa. I am deeply impressed by the dynamic Japanese artists. After entering high school, he started DJing, and was influenced by the remix work of Dub Master Established DaBLADE RECORDS to release CDs. He frequently DJs and remixes as RAM RIDER, and has also taken part in ELT and Ayumi Hamasaki's works as a remixer. In 2002, he appeared at the New York Tokyo Music Festival in New York, where he DJed with Yukihiro Fukutomi, whom he admires, and others. Currently, his music is mainly focused on house, disco, and techno. He makes full use of filter effects to create sounds similar to those of DaftPunk, and provides remixes and music. Since 2003, he has taken up vocals himself and has been accompanied by support members. Currently performing live.

== Discography ==
1996

- Released 1st "fake compilation A" on CD. 500 pieces.

1997

- 2nd “fake compilation B/Sunpraised EP” first analog release. 1000 pieces. The jacket was created by Koji Morimoto, who is well-known as the animation director for PVs such as Ken Ishi and GLAY, and the movie Akira.

1998

- 3rd "fake compilation C/ L-Rep" released. A collaboration double A-side record with Nerdcore founder Leopardon. Clear orange version limited to 500 pieces released, sold out in one week.

1999

- 4th "fake compilation D/Rainbow ballpoint pen CD" released. A compilation CD featuring super young domestic artists including RAM RIDER and Leopardon. Additional presses will be made after 1000 copies are sold out. It became the number one hit on DaBLADE RECORDS.

1999

- ELT / pray (remix)
- Ayumi Hamasaki / kanariya (remix)

2000

- Ayumi Hamasaki / SEASONS (Remix)
- Ayumi Hamasaki / AUDIENCE (Remix)
- Yuami Hamasaki / M (Remix)

2001

- Ayumi Hamasaki / EVOLUTION (Remix)
- Ayumi Hamasaki / Endless Sorrow (Remix)
- Spelunkers / Garko (Remix)

2002

- Ayumi Hamasaki / I am,,,
- HONDA LADY / 88 (remix)
- Haruko Momoi / Heavenly Punishment!! (Remix)

2003

- Ayumi Hamasaki / REAL ME (Remix)
- Nana Katase / Mirror Ball (music provided)

=== Singles ===
Title	Release date	Oricon Weekly Singles Chart
Indie
"Music" (MUSIC)	March 16, 2004	145
"Sweet Dance" (SWEET DANCE)	November 17, 2004	119
Major
"Yume de Aeru yo" (ユメデアエルヨ)	June 29, 2005	109
"Bedroom Disco" (ベッドルームディスコ)	September 14, 2005	90
"Hello" (HELLO)	November 16, 2005	138
"Tabi e Deyō / Any Colors" (旅へ出よう / ANY COLORS)	July 5, 2006	112
"Ram Rider EP" (RAM RIDER EP): vinyl single	May 7, 2008	
"Hanamizuki" (ハナミズキ): digital single	December 5, 2012	

== Albums ==
Title	Release date	Oricon Weekly Singles Chart
Portable Disco (PORTABLE DISCO)	November 30, 2005	52
Portable Disco 8-bit edition (PORTABLE DISCO 8bit edition)	April 26, 2006	—
Kimi ga Suki + Remix Tumes (きみがすき＋Remix Tunes)	April 11, 2007	120
Space Program [Star] Compiled by Ram Rider (space program [STAR] Compiled by RAM RIDER)	March 4, 2009	—
Future Memories (FUTURE MEMORIES): released under the band name of Private Planet (PRIVATE PLANET)	March 4, 2009	—
Audio Galaxy – Ram Rider vs. Stars!!! (AUDIO GALAXY – RAM RIDER vs STARS!!!)	April 11, 2012	49
Audio Galaxy – Ram Rider Strikes Back!!! (AUDIO GALAXY – RAM RIDER STRIKES BACK!!!)	April 11, 2012	
