= Kyary Pamyu Pamyu discography =

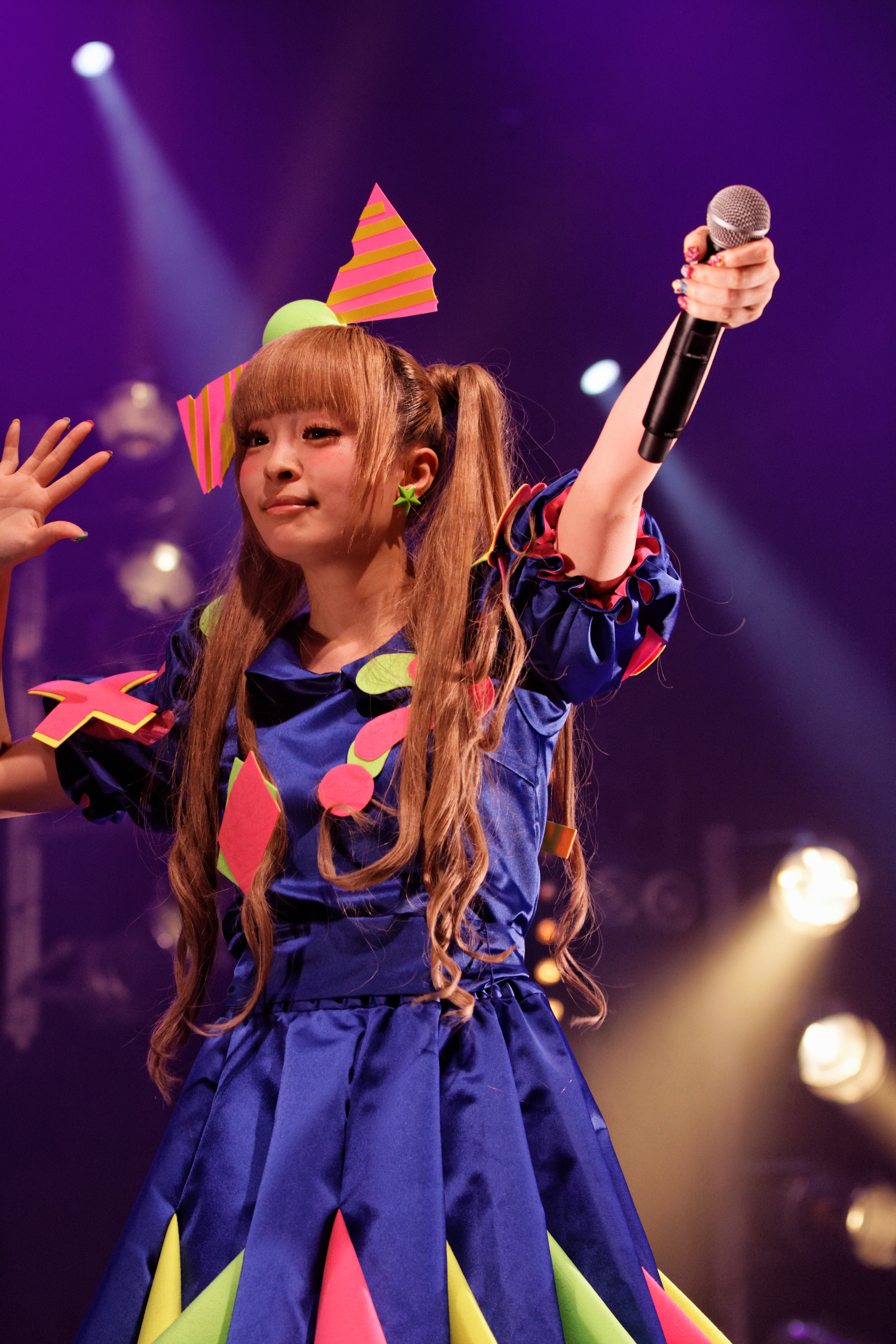
- Kyary Pamyu Pamyu performing at Japan Expo in 2012
- Studio albums: 5
- EPs: 5
- Compilation albums: 2
- Singles: 31
- Video albums: 8
- Music videos: 37

The discography of Japanese model-singer Kyary Pamyu Pamyu consists of five studio albums, two compilation albums, five extended plays, thirty-one singles and eight video albums. Kyary Pamyu Pamyu debuted in 2011 under Warner Music Japan sublabel Unborde, as a musician produced by Yasutaka Nakata of the electronic duo Capsule. Kyary Pamyu Pamyu's albums have been released globally, with her seeing international success in Belgium, South Korea and Taiwan.

Kyary Pamyu Pamyu released several products before her official major label debut with Warner. In 2005, she released an idol DVD at the age of 12 under her real name Kiriko Takemura. In 2010 under the name Kyary, she released two singles digitally as a part of the Avex high school musician project, highschoolsinger.jp. In 2011, Kyary Pamyu Pamyu produced an album of Studio Ghibli songs covered electronically by a variety of musicians.

Kyary Pamyu Pamyu's second album Nanda Collection (2013) debuted at number one in Japan, becoming certified Platinum by the RIAJ. All five songs released as singles from the album also became certified, with "Ninja Re Bang Bang" certified Double Platinum for legal downloads to desktop computers.

== Studio albums ==
List of albums, with selected chart positions and certifications
Title	Album details	Peak positions						Sales (JPN) (Note: Sales provided by Oricon database and are rounded to the nearest thousand copies.)	Certifications
Title	Album details	JPN	BEL (WA)	KOR Intl. (Note: Week references for Gaon: Pika Pika Fantajin,)	TWN	TWN East Asia (Note: Week references for G-Music: Pamyu Pamyu Revolution 2013 week 11, "Kimi ni 100 Percent/Furisodation" 2013 week 11, "Fashion Monster" 2013 week 11, "Ninja Re Bang Bang" 2013 week 15, "Invader Invader" 2013 week 22, Dokidoki Wakuwaku Pamyu Pamyu Revolution Land 2013 week 22, Nanda Collection 2013 week 27, "Mottai Night Land" 2013 week 45, "Mondai Girl", "Crazy Party Night (Pumpkin no Gyakushū)".)	US World	Sales (JPN)	Certifications
Pamyu Pamyu Revolution (ぱみゅぱみゅレボリューション, Pamyu Pamyu Reboryūshon)	Released: May 23, 2012 (JPN); Label: unBORDE; Formats: CD, CD/DVD, LP, digital download	2	176	—	19	3	—	163,000	RIAJ: Gold
Nanda Collection (なんだこれくしょん, Nanda Korekushon; "What the? Collection")	Released: June 26, 2013 (JPN); Label: unBORDE; Formats: CD, CD/DVD, LP, digital download	1	—	—	—	7	2	269,000	RIAJ: Platinum
Pika Pika Fantajin (ピカピカふぁんたじん; "Sparkling Fantasizer")	Released: July 9, 2014 (JPN); Label: unBORDE; Formats: CD, CD/DVD, LP, digital download	1	—	36	—	—	9	74,000	RIAJ: Gold
Japamyu (じゃぱみゅ; "Japan Pamyu")	Released: September 26, 2018 (JPN); Label: unBORDE; Formats: CD, CD/DVD, digital download	12	—	—	—	—	—	14,000; 876 (dig.)	
Candy Racer (キャンディーレーサー; "Kyandīrēsā")	Released: October 27, 2021 (JPN); Label: Nippon Columbia, KRK LAB; Formats: CD, digital download	22	—	—	—	—	—	4,000	
"—" denotes items that did not chart.

== Extended play ==
List of extended plays, with selected chart positions
Title	EP details	Peak positions	Sales (JPN)
Title	EP details	JPN	Sales (JPN)
Moshi Moshi Harajuku (もしもし原宿; "Hello Harajuku")	Released: August 17, 2011 (JPN); Label: Unborde; Formats: CD, CD/DVD, LP, digital download	18	26,000
The World's Favorite Kyary Pamyu Pamyu	Released: April 15, 2022 (JPN); Label: Warner Music Group - X5 Music Group; Formats: Digital download	—	
Kyary Pamyu Pamyu Songs for Music Festival	Released: April 15, 2022 (JPN); Label: Warner Music Group - X5 Music Group; Formats: Digital download	—	
Kyary Pamyu Pamyu Songs for Travelling	Released: April 15, 2022 (JPN); Label: Warner Music Group - X5 Music Group; Formats: Digital download	—	
Kyary Pamyu Pamyu Songs for Chill Time	Released: August 19, 2022 (JPN); Label: Warner Music Group - X5 Music Group; Formats: Digital download	—	

== Compilation albums ==
List of albums, with selected chart positions
Title	Album details	Peak positions		Sales (JPN)	Certification
Title	Album details	JPN	US World	Sales (JPN)	Certification
Pamyu Pamyu Evolution (Otona-tachi no Mikata Box) (ぱみゅぱみゅエボリューション (大人たちの味方BOX); "Adult Friends Box")	Released: December 19, 2012 (JPN); Label: unBORDE; Formats: CD, CD/DVD, digital download	114	—	1,000	
KPP Best	Released: May 25, 2016 (JPN); Label: unBORDE; Formats: 3CD+DVD, 2CD, digital download	2	11	81,368; 2,847 (dig.)	RIAJ: Gold

== Produced albums ==
List of albums
Title	Album details
Kyary Pamyu Pamyu no Ghibli Set (きゃりーぱみゅぱみゅのジブリセット, Kyarī Pamyu Pamyu no Jiburi Setto)	Released: June 8, 2011 (JPN); Label: AsobiMusic, Universal; Formats: CD, digital download

== Singles ==
=== As a lead artist ===
List of singles, with selected chart positions and certifications
Title	Year	Peak chart positions				Sales (JPN)	Certifications	Album
Title	Year	JPN	JPN Hot (Note: Sources for chart positions are as follows: "Ponponpon", "Tsukematsukeru", "Candy Candy", "Onedari 44°C", "Fashion Monster", "Kimi ni 100%", "Furisodation", "Ninja Re Bang Bang", "Invader Invader", "Mottai Night Land", "Yume no Hajima Ring Ring", "Family Party", "Kira Kira Killer", "Mondai Girl", "Crazy Party Night (Pumpkin no Gyakushū)", "Feel".)	TWN East Asia	US World	Sales (JPN)	Certifications	Album
"Pon Pon Pon"	2011	—	9	—	15		RIAJ (digital): Platinum	Moshi Moshi Harajuku / Pamyu Pamyu Revolution
"Tsukematsukeru" (つけまつける; "Put on False Eyelashes")	2012	7	2	—	— (Note: Charted as an EP at number 8 on the Billboard World Albums chart.)	34,000	RIAJ (PC): Platinum; RIAJ (cellphone): Gold	Pamyu Pamyu Revolution
"Candy Candy"	2012	8	2	—	—	17,000	RIAJ (PC): Gold	Pamyu Pamyu Revolution
"Fashion Monster" (ファッションモンスター; Fasshon Monsutā)	2012	5	2	8	—	47,000	RIAJ (PC): Platinum	Nanda Collection
"Kimi ni 100 Percent" (キミに100パーセント; "100% to You")	2013	3	3	6	—	34,000	RIAJ (digital): Gold	Nanda Collection
"Furisodation" (ふりそでーしょん; Furisodēshon)	2013	3	6	6	—	34,000	RIAJ (PC): Gold	Nanda Collection
"Ninja Re Bang Bang" (にんじゃりばんばん; Ninjaribanban)	2013	3	1	12	—	51,000	RIAJ (PC): 2× Platinum; RIAJ (cellphone): Gold	Nanda Collection
"Invader Invader" (インベーダーインベーダー; Inbēdā Inbēdā)	2013	6	3	12	18	25,000	RIAJ (digital): Platinum	Nanda Collection
"Mottai Night Land" (もったいないとらんど; "Wasteful Night Land")	2013	8	4	13	—	30,000	RIAJ (digital): Gold	Pika Pika Fantajin
"Yume no Hajima Ring Ring" (ゆめのはじまりんりん; "The Start of a Dreamringring")	2014	11	3	—	—	18,000		Pika Pika Fantajin
"Family Party" (ファミリーパーティー; Famirī Pātī)	2014	2	4	—	—	21,000		Pika Pika Fantajin
"Kira Kira Killer" (きらきらキラー, Kirakira Kirā) "Sparkling Killer"	2014	— (Note: As a CD+bonus goods set, "Kirakira Killer" was ineligible to chart on the Oricon singles chart.)	10	—	—	7,777 (Note: "Kirakira Killer" was limited to 7,777 physical copies sold.)		Pika Pika Fantajin
"Mondai Girl" (もんだいガール; "Problem Girl")	2015	6	2	11	—	20,000	RIAJ (digital): Gold	KPP Best
"Crazy Party Night (Pumpkin no Gyakushū)" (Crazy Party Night ~ぱんぷきんの逆襲~; "The Pumpkin's Counterattack")	2015	12	12	8	—	13,000		KPP Best
"Sai & Co" (最＆高, Sai & Kō) "Great & Est"	2016	16	11	—	25	7,500		KPP Best
"Harajuku Iyahoi" (原宿いやほい; "Harajuku Iyahoi")	2017	15	32	—	—	4,000		Japamyu
"Easta" (良すた; "It's Alright")	2017	15	17	—	—	5,000		Non-album single
"Kimi no Mikata" (きみのみかた; "Your Friend")	2018	— (Note: "Kimi no Mikata" did not enter the Oricon Singles Chart, but peaked at number 18 on the Oricon Digital Singles Chart.)	31	—	—	4,055 (dig.)		Japamyu
"Kimi ga Iine Kuretara" (キミがいいねくれたら; "If You Give 'Likes'")	2019	—	— (Note: Charted at number 33 on the Download Songs chart .)	—	—			Candy Racer
"Kamaitachi" (かまいたち; "Kamai-tachi")	2020	—	— (Note: Charted at number 46 on the Download Songs chart .)	—	—			Candy Racer
"Gum Gum Girl" (ガムガムガール; Gamu Gamu Gāru)	2021	—	—	—	—			Candy Racer
"Genten Kaihi" (原点回避; Origin Avoidance)	2021	—	—	—	—			Candy Racer
"Maybe Baby" (メイビーベイビー; Meibī Beibī)	2022	—	—	—	—			TBA
"Isshin Doutai" (一心同体; One Body)	2022	—	—	—	—			TBA
"Oedoedo"	2024	—	—	—	—			TBA
"Kuru Kuru Harajuku"	2025	—	—	—	—			TBA
"Dreamin Dreamin"	2025	—	—	—	—			TBA
"Genjitsu-Touhi" (現実逃避)	2025	—	—	—	—			TBA
"Focus Focus"	2026	—	—	—	—			TBA
"Tsukihime" (月姫)	2026	—	—	—	—			TBA
"Pang Pang Pang"	2026	— (Note: "Pang Pang Pang" did not enter the Oricon Singles Chart, but peaked at number 31 on the Oricon Digital Singles Chart.)	— (Note: "Pang Pang Pang" did not enter the Billboard Japan Hot 100, but peaked at number 31 on the Download Songs chart.)	—	—	879 (dig.)		TBA
"—" denotes items that did not chart or were not released in that territory.

=== As a featured artist ===
List of singles, with selected chart positions
Title	Year	Peak chart positions	Album
Title	Year	JPN Hot	Album
"Feel" (among Unborde All Stars)	2016	53	Feel + Unborde Greatest Hits
"Crazy Crazy" (alongside Charli XCX)	2017	35	Digital Native

=== Remix singles ===
List of singles, with selected chart positions
Title	Year	Album
"Ninja Re Bang Bang (Steve Aoki Remix)"	2020	Tomorrowland Around The World 2020: Steve Aoki (DJ Mix)
"Candy Candy (Moe Shop Remix)"	2023	Non-album single

=== Promotional singles ===
List of singles, with selected chart positions
Title	Year	Peak chart positions		Album
Title	Year	JPN Hot	JPN RIAJ (Note: The RIAJ Digital Track Chart is a depreciated chart that ran from 2009 until early 2012 and tracked full-length cellphone downloads.) (Note: Sources for chart positions are as follows: "Kyary Anan", "Suki Sugite Kiresō".)	Album
"Miracle Orange" (ミラクルオレンジ, Mirakuru Orenji) (as Kyary)	2010	—	—	Non-album singles
"Loveberry" (ラブベリー, Rabuberī)	2010	—	—	Non-album singles
"Jelly"	2011	—	—	Moshi Moshi Harajuku
"Kyary Anan" (きゃりーANAN, Kyarī Anan)	2011	—	34	"Tsukematsukeru" (single) / Pamyu Pamyu Revolution
"Onedari 44°C" (おねだり44°C; "Begging 44°C")	2012	71	—	Pamyu Pamyu Revolution
"Suki Sugite Kiresō" (スキすぎてキレそう; "Loving You So Much I Might Go Crazy")	2012	—	96	Pamyu Pamyu Revolution
"Minna no Uta" (みんなのうた; "Everyone's Song")	2012	—	—	Pamyu Pamyu Revolution
"Super Scooter Happy"	2013	— (Note: Charted at number 78 on the Adult Contemporary Airplay chart.)	—	Nanda Collection
"Serious Hitomi" (シリアスひとみ; "Serious Eyes")	2014	— (Note: Charted at number 33 on the Adult Contemporary Airplay chart and at number 94 on the Hot Top Airplay chart.)	—	Pika Pika Fantajin
"Ring a Bell"	2014	— (Note: Charted at number 81 on the Hot Top Airplay chart.)	—	Pika Pika Fantajin
"Kizunami" (キズナミ)	2018	— (Note: Charted at number 17 on the Hot Animation chart .)	—	Japamyu
"Jumping Up" (じゃんぴんなっぷ)	2021	—	—	Candy Racer
"Dodonpa" (どどんぱ)	2021	—	—	Candy Racer
"—" denotes items that did not chart.

== Other appearances ==
List of non-studio album or guest appearances that feature Kyary Pamyu Pamyu
Title	Year	Album
"Into Darkness" (Yasutaka Nakata with Kyary Pamyu Pamyu)	2013	Star Trek Into Darkness
"Hey World" (Eigo de Asobo Meets the World feat. Kyary Pamyu Pamyu)	2024	Eigo de Asobo Meets the World 2023-2024 Best (えいごであそぼ Meets the World 2023-2024ベスト, "Play with English Meets the World 2023-2024 Best")
"Kyary's ABCs" (Eigo de Asobo Meets the World feat. Kyary Pamyu Pamyu)	2024	Eigo de Asobo Meets the World 2023-2024 Best (えいごであそぼ Meets the World 2023-2024ベスト, "Play with English Meets the World 2023-2024 Best")
"One Week" (Eigo de Asobo Meets the World feat. Kyary Pamyu Pamyu)	2024	Eigo de Asobo Meets the World 2023-2024 Best (えいごであそぼ Meets the World 2023-2024ベスト, "Play with English Meets the World 2023-2024 Best")
"Sushi Sushi Yummy" (Eigo de Asobo Meets the World feat. Kyary Pamyu Pamyu)	2024	Eigo de Asobo Meets the World 2023-2024 Best (えいごであそぼ Meets the World 2023-2024ベスト, "Play with English Meets the World 2023-2024 Best")
"Rainbow Rainbow" (Eigo de Asobo Meets the World feat. Kyary Pamyu Pamyu)	2024	Eigo de Asobo Meets the World 2023-2024 Best (えいごであそぼ Meets the World 2023-2024ベスト, "Play with English Meets the World 2023-2024 Best")
"Magical Musical Instruments" (Eigo de Asobo Meets the World feat. Kyary Pamyu Pamyu)	2024	Eigo de Asobo Meets the World 2023-2024 Best (えいごであそぼ Meets the World 2023-2024ベスト, "Play with English Meets the World 2023-2024 Best")
"Magic Stars" (Eigo de Asobo Meets the World feat. Kyary Pamyu Pamyu)	2024	TBA
"Happy Holidays" (Eigo de Asobo Meets the World feat. Kyary Pamyu Pamyu)	2024	TBA

== Video albums ==
=== Live concerts ===
List of media, with selected chart positions
Title	Album details	Peak positions		
Title	Album details	JPN DVD	JPN Blu-ray	TWN
Dokidoki Wakuwaku Pamyu Pamyu Revolution Land 2012 in Kira Kira Budōkan (ドキドキワクワク ぱみゅぱみゅレボリューションランド 2012 in キラキラ武道館; Heart-thumping Exciting Pamyu Pamyu Revolution Land 2012 in Sparkling Budokan)	Released: February 13, 2013 (JPN); Label: Warner; Formats: DVD, Blu-ray	5	14	8
Kyary Pamyu Pamyu no Magical Wonder Castle (きゃりーぱみゅぱみゅのマジカルワンダーキャッスル, Kyarī Pamyu Pamyu no Majikaru Wandā Kyassuru)	Released: June 11, 2014 (JPN); Label: Warner; Formats: DVD, Blu-ray	6	4	—
KPP 2014 Japan Arena Tour Kyarypamyupamyu no Colorful Panic Toy Box (KPP 2014 JAPAN ARENA TOUR きゃりーぱみゅぱみゅのからふるぱにっくTOY BOX, KPP 2014 Japan Arēna Tsuā Kyaripamiyupamyu no Karafuru Panikku Toi Bokkusu)	Released: June 22, 2015 (JPN); Label: Warner; Formats: DVD, Blu-ray	6	15	—
KPP 5ive Years Monster World Tour 2016 in Nippon Budokan (KPP Years Monster ワールドツアー2016 in 日本武道館, KPP 5ive Years monsutāwārudotsuā 2016-nen in Nihonbudōkan)	Released: April 5, 2017 (JPN); Label: Warner; Formats: DVD, Blu-ray	33	27	—
The Spooky Obakeyashiki - Pumpkins Strike Back -	Released: June 27, 2018 (JPN); Label: Warner; Formats: DVD, Blu-ray	41	47	—
Otonokuni Live Tour 2019 (音ノ国ライブツアー2019, Oto no kuni raibutsuā 2019)	Released: October 15, 2020 (JPN); Formats: DVD, Blu-ray	—	—	—
The Family 10.31	Released: November 16, 2020 (JPN); Formats: Streaming	—	—	—
Great Invitation	Released: April 17, 2021 (JPN); Formats: Streaming	—	—	—

=== Music video collections ===
List of media, with selected chart positions
Title	Album details	Peak positions	
Title	Album details	JPN DVD	JPN Blu-ray
KPP MV 01	Released: September 30, 2015 (JPN); Label: Warner; Formats: DVD, Blu-ray	9	16

=== Documentaries and television programs ===
List of media, with selected chart positions
Title	Album details	Peak positions	
Title	Album details	JPN DVD	JPN Blu-ray
K@sumi Takemura Kiriko Jūni-sai (K＠sumI 竹村桐子12歳; "Mist: Takemura Kiriko, 12 years old")	Released: December 16, 2005 (JPN); Label: Petit-ami Japan; Formats: DVD	—	—
Kyary Pamyu Pamyu TV John! (きゃりーぱみゅぱみゅテレビJOHN!, Kyarī Pamyu Pamyu Terebi Jon)	Released: June 6, 2012 (JPN); Label: Aeon Entertainment; Formats: DVD	79	—
Kyary Pamyu Pamyu TV John! Vol. 2 (きゃりーぱみゅぱみゅテレビJOHN!, Kyarī Pamyu Pamyu Terebi Jon Boryūmu Tsū)	Released: December 19, 2012 (JPN); Label: Aeon; Formats: DVD	—	—
100% KPP World Tour 2013 Official Documentary	Released: January 29, 2014 (JPN); Label: Warner; Formats: DVD, Blu-ray	17	18
Kyary Pamyu Pamyu TV John! Vol. 3	Released: December 17, 2014 (JPN); Label: Aeon; Formats: DVD	—	—

== Music videos ==
Title	Director(s)	Originating album	Year	Ref.
"Pon Pon Pon"	Jun Tamukai	Moshi Moshi Harajuku	2011	
"Tsukematsukeru"	Jun Tamukai	Pamyu Pamyu Revolution	2012	
"Candy Candy"	Jun Tamukai	Pamyu Pamyu Revolution	2012	
"Fashion Monster"	Jun Tamukai	Nanda Collection	2012	
"Furisodation"	Jun Tamukai	Nanda Collection	2013	
"Ninja Re Bang Bang"	Jun Tamukai	Nanda Collection	2013	
"Invader Invader"	Jun Tamukai	Nanda Collection	2013	
"Mottai Night Land"	Jun Tamukai	Pika Pika Fantajin	2013	
"Yume no Hajima Ring Ring"	Jun Tamukai	Pika Pika Fantajin	2014	
"Family Party"	Jun Tamukai	Pika Pika Fantajin	2014	
"Kira Kira Killer"	Jun Tamukai	Pika Pika Fantajin	2014	
"Mondai Girl"	Jun Tamukai	KPP Best	2015	
"Crazy Party Night 〜Pumpkin no Gyakushuu〜"	Yusuke Tanaka (Caviar)	KPP Best	2015	
"Cherry Bonbon"	Kumiko Iijima	Moshimoshi Harajuku	2015	
"Kyary Anan"	Jun Tamukai	Pamyupamyu Revolution	2015	
"Feel"	Tan Shūichi	Feel + unBORDE GREATEST HITS	2016	
"Sai & Co"	Hideyuki Tanaka （Framegraphics）	KPP Best	2016	
"Crazy Crazy"	Kazuaki Seki	Digital Native	2017	
"Harajuku Iyahoi"	Hideyuki Tanaka （Framegraphics）	Japamyu	2017	
"Easta"	Sawatari Eri	Non-album single	2017	
"Kimi no Mikata"	Jun Tamukai	Japamyu	2018	
"Koi no Hana" Live Music Video from Cherry Martini of Stardust	Jun Tamukai	Japamyu	2018	
"Kizunami" Live Music Video from OTONOKO 2018	Katsuya Sakurai	Japamyu	2018	
"Oto no Kuni"	Fantasista Utamaro (KOTOBUKISUN INC.)/ Satoru Ohno	Japamyu	2018	
"Kimi ga Iine Kuretara"	Fantasista Utamaro/ Satoru Ohno	Candy Racer	2019	
"Kamaitachi"	MaiSakai	Candy Racer	2020	
"Ninja Re Bang Bang Steve Aoki Remix MashupVideo-KYARY PAMYU PAMYU×Ninjala"	CUEDOT Inc.	non-album single	2020	
"Gum Gum Girl"	Jun Tamukai	Candy Racer	2021	
"Genten Kaihi"	Shun Nagata / Koji Yamamoto	Candy Racer	2021	
"Dodonpa"	KASICO(FIXION)	Candy Racer	2021	
"Candy Racer"	malloon + KASICO (koe Inc.)	Candy Racer	2021	
"Maybe Baby Official Video Valentine's Day ver."	Unknown	TBA	2022	
"Isshin Doutai"	Nao Watanabe	TBA	2022	
"Focus Focus"	Masaki Watanabe (maxilla)	TBA	2026	
"Kuru Kuru Harajuku"	Jun Tamukai	TBA	2026	
"Tsukihime"	Takuya Oyama	TBA	2026	
"Pang Pang Pang"	Jun Tamukai	TBA	2026	
