= Nanda Collection World Tour =

2014 concert tour by Kyary Pamyu Pamyu

- Tour by Kyary Pamyu Pamyu
- Official logo of the world tour
- Associated album: Nanda Collection
- Start date: February 13, 2014
- End date: November 21, 2014
- Legs: 5
- No. of shows: 6 in North America; 1 in Australia; 3 in Europe; 6 in Asia; 16 total

Kyary Pamyu Pamyu concert chronology
- 100%KPP World Tour (2013); Nanda Collection World Tour (2014); Kyary Pamyu Pamyu no Kumo no Ue no Heaven's Door (2014)

The Nanda Collection World Tour (also named KPP Nanda Collection World Tour 2014) was the second world tour by Japanese singer Kyary Pamyu Pamyu, in support of her 2013 studio album Nanda Collection.

== Setlist ==
=== North America ===
1. "Nanda Collection" (なんだこれくしょん) (Intro)
2. "Invader Invader" (インベーダーインベーダー)
3. "Me" (み)
4. "Ninja Re Bang Bang" (にんじゃりばんばん)
5. "Kyary ANAN" (きゃりーANAN)
6. "Furisodation" (ふりそでーしょん)

Intermission

1. "RGB" (by Capsule); instrumental)

Segment 2

7. "Pamyu Pamyu Revolution" (ぱみゅぱみゅレボリューション)
8. "Mottai Night Land" (もったいないとらんど)
9. "Sungoi Aura" (すんごいオーラ)
10. "Kura Kura" (くらくら)
11. "Super Scooter Happy" (Capsule cover)
12. "Yume no Hajima Ring Ring" (ゆめのはじまりんりん)
13. "Saigo no Ice Cream" (さいごのアイスクリーム)
14. "Tsukematsukeru" (つけまつける)
15. ""Kyary no March" (きゃりーのマーチ)
16. "Cherry Bonbon" (チェリーボンボン)
17. "Pon Pon Pon"
19. ""Fashion Monster" (ファッションモンスター)

Encore

20. "Candy Candy"
21. "Chan Chaka Chan Chan" (ちゃんちゃかちゃんちゃん)

=== Australia / Asia / Europe ===
1. "Nanda Collection" (なんだこれくしょん) (Intro)
2. "Invader Invader" (インベーダーインベーダー)
3. "Me" (み)
4. "Family Party" (ファミリーパーティー)
5. "Ninja Re Bang Bang" (にんじゃりばんばん)
6. "Kyary ANAN" (きゃりーANAN)
7. "Furisodation" (ふりそでーしょん)
8. "Pamyu Pamyu Revolution" (ぱみゅぱみゅレボリューション)
9. "Mottai Night Land" (もったいないとらんど)
10. "Sungoi Aura" (すんごいオーラ)
11. "Kura Kura" (くらくら)
12. "Super Scooter Happy" (Capsule cover)
13. "Yume no Hajima Ring Ring" (ゆめのはじまりんりん)
14. "Saigo no Ice Cream" (さいごのアイスクリーム)
15. "Tsukematsukeru" (つけまつける)
16. "Kyary no March" (きゃりーのマーチ)
17. "Cherry Bonbon" (チェリーボンボン)
18. "PonPonPon"
19. "Fashion Monster" (ファッションモンスター)

Encore

20. "Candy Candy"
21. "Chan Chaka Chan Chan" (ちゃんちゃかちゃんちゃん)

== Tour dates ==
Date (2014)	City	Country	Venue
North America
February 13	Seattle	United States	The Showbox
February 15	San Francisco	United States	The Regency Center
February 16	Los Angeles	United States	Club Nokia
March 5	Chicago	United States	House of Blues
March 7	Toronto	Canada	Sound Academy
March 8	New York City	United States	Best Buy Theater
Australia
March 23 (Note: The March 23, 2014 concert at the UNSW Roundhouse was originally to be held at the Metro Theatre, but was moved due to high demand.)	Sydney	Australia	UNSW Roundhouse
Asia
April 5	Kowloon Bay	Hong Kong	Rotunda 3, KITEC
Europe
April 25	Paris	France	Bataclan
April 27	Cologne	Germany	Gloria Theater
April 29 (Note: This performance was recorded for the second disc of the DVD and Blu-ray release "KPP 2014 JAPAN ARENA TOUR Colorful Panic TOY BOX".)	London	England	Shepherd's Bush Empire
Asia
May 17	Tokyo	Japan	Zepp Tokyo
May 18	Tokyo	Japan	Zepp Tokyo
May 30	Taipei	Taiwan	Taipei International Convention Center
June 21	Singapore		The Star Performing Arts Centre (Singapore's Japan Music Festival)
November 21 (Note: The November 21, 2014 concert in Thailand at Centerpoint Studio was originally to take place on June 28th, but was postponed due to coup d'état.)	Bangkok	Thailand	Centerpoint Studio (LASAN)

== Personnel ==
- Kyary Pamyu Pamyu – vocals
- Yasutaka Nakata – music
- Tempura Kidz - backup dancers

== Box office score data ==
Venue	City	Tickets sold / available	Gross revenue
Regency Ballroom	San Francisco	1,424 / 1,424 (100%)	$45,159
Club Nokia	Los Angeles	2,325 / 2,325 (100%)	$81,812
Sound Academy	Toronto	1,572 / 1,572 (100%)	$57,874
Best Buy Theater	New York City	2,150 / 2,150 (100%)	$65,341
