= 2013 MTV Video Music Awards Japan =

Annual Japanese music awards ceremony

- Date: June 22, 2013
- Location: Makuhari Messe
- Hosted by: Nobuaki Kaneko and Atsuko Maeda

Television/radio coverage
- Network: MTV Japan

The 2013 MTV Video Music Awards Japan was held in Chiba on June 22, 2013 at the Makuhari Messe and was hosted by Atsuko Maeda and Nobuaki Kaneko from Rize.

== Awards ==
=== Video of the Year ===
Exile Tribe — "24karats Tribe of Gold"

- Namie Amuro — "In The Spotlight (Tokyo)"
- Bruno Mars — "Locked Out of Heaven"
- Mr. Children — "Marshmallow Day"
- Muse — "Follow Me"

=== Album of the Year ===
2PM — Legend of 2PM

- Carly Rae Jepsen — Kiss
- Linkin Park — Living Things
- Kana Nishino — Love Place
- One Direction — Take Me Home

=== Best Male Video ===
Exile Atsushi — "Melrose ~Aisanai Yakusoku~"

- Bruno Mars — "Locked Out of Heaven"
- Gotye featuring Kimbra — "Somebody That I Used to Know"
- Justin Bieber featuring Nicki Minaj — "Beauty and a Beat"
- Daichi Miura — "Two Hearts"

=== Best Female Video ===
Kana Nishino — "Always"

- Alicia Keys featuring Nicki Minaj — "Girl on Fire"
- Juju — "Arigatō"
- Rihanna — "Diamonds"
- Taylor Swift — "We Are Never Ever Getting Back Together"

=== Best Group Video ===
Sandaime J Soul Brothers from Exile Tribe — "Hanabi"

- Fun featuring Janelle Monáe — "We Are Young"
- Maroon 5 featuring Wiz Khalifa — "Payphone"
- One Direction — "What Makes You Beautiful"
- Tohoshinki — "Catch Me -If you wanna-"

=== Best New Artist ===
Carly Rae Jepsen — "Call Me Maybe"

- Fun featuring Janelle Monáe — "We Are Young"
- Generations — "Brave It Out"
- One Direction — "What Makes You Beautiful"
- Salu featuring H.Tefron — "The Girl On A Board"

=== Best Rock Video ===
One Ok Rock — "The Beginning"

- Fun featuring Janelle Monáe — "We Are Young"
- Man With A Mission — "Distance"
- Muse — "Follow Me"
- Sakanaction — "Yoru no Odoriko"

=== Best Pop Video ===
Kyary Pamyu Pamyu — "Fashion Monster"

- Greeeen — "Orange"
- Justin Bieber featuring Nicki Minaj — "Beauty and a Beat"
- Negoto — "Nameless"
- Taylor Swift — "We Are Never Ever Getting Back Together"

=== Best R&B Video ===
Miliyah Kato featuring Wakadanna — "Lovers Part II"

- Alicia Keys featuring Nicki Minaj — "Girl on Fire"
- Namie Amuro — "In The Spotlight (Tokyo)"
- Frank Ocean — "Pyramids"
- Rihanna — "Diamonds"

=== Best Hip-Hop Video ===
ASAP Rocky featuring Drake, 2 Chainz and Kendrick Lamar — "Fuckin' Problems"

- Aklo — "Red Pill"
- AK-69 — "Start It Again"
- Kendrick Lamar — "Swimming Pools (Drank)"
- Cypress Ueno & Roberto Yoshino featuring Ozrosaurus — "Yokohama Shika"

=== Best Reggae Video ===
lecca — "Clown Love"

- Han-Kun — "Road to Zion"
- Pushim — "Yuuhi"
- Sean Kingston featuring T.I. — "Back 2 Life (Live It Up)"
- Sean Paul featuring lecca — "Dream Girl"

=== Best Dance Video ===
Big Bang — "Fantastic Baby -Ver.Final-"

- Group_inou — "9"
- Megumi Nakajima — "Transfer"
- Skrillex — "Bangarang"
- Zedd featuring Matthew Koma — "Spectrum"

=== Best Video from a Film ===
- One Ok Rock — "The Beginning" (from Rurouni Kenshin)
- Florence and the Machine — "Breath of Life" (from Snow White and the Huntsman)
- Mr. Children — "Inori ~Namida no Kidou~" (from Bokura ga Ita)
- Pitbull — "Back in Time" (from Men in Black 3)

=== Best Collaboration ===
Miyavi vs Yuksek — "Day 1"

- Back Drop Bomb featuring Aklo — "The Beginning and The End"
- Calvin Harris featuring Florence Welch — "Sweet Nothing"
- Maroon 5 featuring Wiz Khalifa — "Payphone"
- Keiichiro Shibuya + Hiroki Azuma featuring Hatsune Miku — "Initiation"

=== Best Choreography ===
Momoiro Clover Z — "Saraba, Itoshiki Kanashimitachi yo"

- Chris Brown — "Turn Up the Music" (choreography by Anwar "Flii" Burton)
- Pink — "Try" (choreography by the Golden Boyz)
- Willy Moon — "Yeah Yeah" (choreography by Olivier Casamayou and Carine Charaire)
- World Order — "Permanent Revolution" (choreography by Ryo Noguch)

=== Best Karaokee! Song ===
Kyary Pamyu Pamyu — "Fashion Monster"

- Bruno Mars — "Locked Out of Heaven"
- Kana Nishino — "Always"
- Taylor Swift — "We Are Never Ever Getting Back Together"
- Sandaime J Soul Brothers from Exile Tribe — "Fireworks"

=== Legend Award ===
TLC

== Performers ==
- Momoiro Clover Z — "Overdue / Saraba, Itoshiki Kanashimitachi yo"
- Kana Nishino — "Believe / Always"
- Imagine Dragons — "It's Time"
- Miliyah Kato x Shota Shimizu — "Love Story"
- Beni — "Run Away"
- Miho Fukuhara — "Rising Heart"
- Shōnan no Kaze — "Games Shonan Play"
- Vamps — "Ahead / Replay"
- Exile Tribe with Sandaime J Soul Brothers III — "24karats Tribe of Gold"*
- TLC — TLC Greatest Hits Medley
- Nicole Jung (KARA) — "Lost"
- Carly Rae Jepsen with Momoiro Clover Z — "Tonight I'm Getting Over You / Call Me Maybe"
- Kyary Pamyu Pamyu — "Invader Invader / Ninja Re Bang Bang"

* Exile performance was a special movie from their concert on Tokyo Dome.

== Presenters ==
- Kiko Mizuhara — presented Best R&B Video
- Louis Kurihara and Negoto — presented Best New Artist
- Dream — presented Best Pop Video
- DJ Kaori and Zeebra — presented Legend Award
- Tomomi Kahala — presented Album of the Year
- Joy and Kerakera — presented Best Karaokee! Song
- AK-69 and Amiaya — presented Best Female Video
- Ayame Goriki — presented Video of the Year
