= Dokidoki Wakuwaku Pamyu Pamyu Revolution Land 2012 in Kira Kira Budōkan =

Dokidoki Wakuwaku Pamyu Pamyu Revolution Land

Live album by Kyary Pamyu Pamyu
- Released: February 13, 2013
- Recorded: Nippon Budokan; Tokyo, Japan; November 6, 2012
- Genre: J-pop, bubblegum pop, electropop, dance-pop, electro house
- Length: 96:00
- Label: Unborde (Warner Music Japan)
- Producer: Yasutaka Nakata

Kyary Pamyu Pamyu chronology
Pamyu Pamyu Revolution (2012)	Dokidoki Wakuwaku Pamyu Pamyu Revolution Land (2013)	Nanda Collection (2013)

Dokidoki Wakuwaku Pamyu Pamyu Revolution Land (ドキドキワクワク ぱみゅぱみゅレボリューションランド, Dokidoki Wakuwaku Pamyu Pamyu Reboryūshon Rando) is the first live album by Japanese singer Kyary Pamyu Pamyu, released on February 13, 2013. The DVD is of her largest show to date held at Nippon Budokan in Tokyo on November 6, 2012. The show's concept was of a pop-up picture book, and features many of Kyary's cute and colorful costumes with even a performance where she flies above the audience. All 20 songs performed are included.

It was released in DVD and Blu-ray editions. A limited edition (DVD only) comes with a bonus disc of a backstage documentary, bonus live footage from other shows, as well as videos of Kyary explaining how to dance "tsukematsukeru" and "Fashion Monster". The limited edition comes as a photo book package.

== Track listing ==
The track listing is also the setlist as shown in order.

All tracks are written by Yasutaka Nakata

No.	Title	Length
1.	"Pamyu Pamyu Revolution (ぱみゅぱみゅレボリューション)"
2.	"Onedari 44°C (おねだり44°C)"
3.	"Minna no Uta (みんなのうた)"
4.	"100% no Jibun ni (100%のじぶんに)"
5.	"Suki Sugite Kiresō (スキすぎてキレそう)"
6.	"Cherry Bonbon (チェリーボンボン)"
7.	"Pinpon ga Nannai (ピンポンがなんない)"
8.	"Chōdo ii no (ちょうどいいの)"
9.	"Candy Candy"
10.	"Kyary no March (きゃりーのマーチ)"
11.	"Kimi ni 100 Percent (キミに100パーセント)"
12.	"Giri Giri Safe (ぎりぎりセーフ)"
13.	"Oyasumi (おやすみ)"
14.	"RGB" (capsule Cover)
15.	"Fashion Monster (ファッションモンスター)"
16.	"PONPONPON"
17.	"Demo Demo Mada Mada (でもでもまだまだ)"
18.	"Kyary ANAN (きゃりーANAN)"
19.	"Chan Chaka Chan Chan (ちゃんちゃかちゃんちゃん)"
20.	"Tsukematsukeru (つけまつける)"
Total length:		96:00

Limited Edition Bonus DVD
No.	Title	Length
1.	"Nippon Budokan Backstage Documentary"
2.	"Pamyu Pamyu Revolution / CANDY CANDY from Pamyu Pamyu Revolution Tour 2012 at Shibuya AX 2012.07.02"
3.	"Kyary no March / PONPONPON from Moshimoshi Quattro at Shibuya Club Quattro 2012.02.25"
4.	"tsukematsukeru furitsuke Video"
5.	"Fashion Monster furitsuke Video"
