= Furisodation =

- Regular edition cover of the "Kimi ni 100 Percent" / "Furisodation" single.

Single by Kyary Pamyu Pamyu

from the album Nanda Collection
- Released: January 30, 2013
- Recorded: 2012
- Genre: J-Pop
- Length: 3:20
- Label: Unborde
- Songwriter: Yasutaka Nakata
- Producer: Yasutaka Nakata

Kyary Pamyu Pamyu singles chronology
"Kimi ni 100 Percent" (2013)	"Furisodation" (2013)	"Ninja Re Bang Bang" (2013)

"Furisodation" (Japanese: ふりそでーしょん, Hepburn: Furisodēshon; "Furisode-ation") is a song by Japanese pop singer Kyary Pamyu Pamyu. Released on January 30, 2013 as a double A-side single along with the song "Kimi ni 100 Percent", the song was themed around the Japanese Coming of Age Day and the Coming of Age Ceremony, and celebrated Kyary Pamyu Pamyu's own coming of age (having just turned twenty years old on January 29, 2013).

The song was commercially successful, receiving a gold certification for downloads by the Recording Industry Association of Japan, and has since become an annual appearance on radio station's playlists during the January coming of age celebrations in Japan.

== Background and development ==
In May 2012, Kyary Pamyu Pamyu released her debut studio album Pamyu Pamyu Revolution, followed by the single "Fashion Monster" in October. Both releases were commercially successful, with the Recording Industry Association of Japan certifying Pamyu Pamyu Revolution gold and "Fashion Monster" platinum. On December 31, Kyary Pamyu Pamyu performed at the 63rd NHK Kōhaku Uta Gassen, her first appearance at the annual new year's music competition. Also in December, Kyary Pamyu Pamyu's 100% KPP World Tour 2013 was announced, beginning in Belgium in February.

The "Kimi ni 100 Percent" / "Furisodation" single was announced in December. The term furisodation, referring to the furisode kimono worn by Japanese women at coming of age ceremonies, and the idea for a coming of age-themed song were both ideas of Nakata's.

== Promotion and release ==
On January 28, an Asobisystem event held at AgeHa in Shin-Kiba, Tokyo was held to celebrate Kyary Pamyu Pamyu's 20th birthday, featuring performances by musicians such as Yasutaka Nakata, Ram Rider and Kyary Pamyu Pamyu herself. This was followed by a mini-tour, Kyary no 100% Pamyu Pamyu Live 2013 (きゃりーの100％ぱみゅぱみゅライブ 2013), featuring a performance in Tokyo on January 30 and two performances in Nagoya and Osaka on February 2.

On February 1, Kyary Pamyu Pamyu performed "Furisodation" live at Music Station, a week after performing "Kimi ni 100 Percent". "Furisodation" was used in commercials promoting the collaborative mash-up goods between Kyary Pamyu Pamyu and merchandise character Mameshiba, dubbed Mameshipamyupamyu (豆しぱみゅぱみゅ).

== Cover artwork ==
The cover and booklet artworks were given a theme of "Kyary as an adult". On the cover of the regular edition of the single, Kyary Pamyu Pamyu dresses up as an actress, while in the limited edition photobook edition she wears a wedding dress. The photobook features additional concepts, such as pictures of Kyary Pamyu Pamyu parodying nude pregnancy photoshoots, and her as a 70-year-old woman in Harajuku. The artworks were designed and directed by Steve Nakamura, and were a collaboration with photographer Takeshi Hanzawa, hair and make-up artist Shinji Konishi and stylist Kumiko Iijima.

== Music video ==
Scenes from the music video that depicted Kyary Pamyu Pamyu drinking were criticised by anti-drinking groups.

The music video for the song was released on January 9, 2013, and was directed by Jun Tamukai. The video was themes with the Japanese celebratory colours red and white, and featured Kyary Pamyu Pamyu dancing in a line dance-style choreography with her dancers. Additional scenes featured Kyary Pamyu Pamyu drinking alcohol, as 20 is the legal drinking age in Japan.

Unlike the title of the song, Kyary Pamyu Pamyu does not wear a furisode in the music video, instead wears a Western-style dress. While the initial plan was to feature Kyary Pamyu Pamyu in a kimono, she decided against this, as she wanted the music video "danceable musical-style" to reflect the happiness at turning 20 featured in the song. Kyary Pamyu Pamyu wears her hair in a ponytail in the video, which was a symbolic "first step" into becoming an adult and away from her regular twin tail-style hairstyle.

=== Controversy ===
Warner Music Japan received criticism by the Arūkōru Yakubutsu Mondai Zenkoku Shimin Kyōkai (アルコール薬物問題全国市民協会; "The National Association Against Alcohol and Drug Abuse"), due to scenes depicting Kyary Pamyu Pamyu rapidly drinking. The group noted the video's heavy rotation at karaoke venues frequented by youth, the group felt the video was inappropriate after the deaths of six university students in 2012 from intoxication. In an open letter to Warner Music Japan, the association asked Warner Music to edit out scenes from the video which depicted Kyary Pamyu Pamyu drinking straight from a bottle, as well as other drunken scenes. Warner responded by adding a disclaimer against fast drinking and underage drinking to the description box of the YouTube video, and released a statement in the media stating that the video was not meant to promote alcohol to minors.

== Reception ==
=== Critical reception ===
Rolling Stone Japan reviewer Kazumi Nanba gave the "Kimi ni 100 Percent" / "Furisodation" single 3.5 stars out of five, feeling that the song was completely different to "Kimi ni 100 Percent". Compared to the "relaxed and light" "Kimi ni 100 Percent", Nanba felt that the song was an intense earworm. CDJournal reviewers described the song as electropop, and felt that the quick tempo and "sprinting piano" of "Furisodation" was as if the song were expressing the happiness of having an expanding world after coming of age.

=== Commercial reception ===
During its initial run, the song peaked at number six on the Billboard Japan Hot 100, independent of "Kimi ni 100 Percent". Eight months after its release, it was certified gold for 100,000 downloads to desktop computers by the Recording Industry Association of Japan. This was a much better performance compared to "Kimi ni 100 Percent", which was certified gold for combined cellphone and desktop downloads 18 months after its release in June 2014.

"Furisodation" has become an annual appearance on Billboard's Adult Contemporary Airplay chart. In both 2014 and 2015, the song peaked in the top ten songs during the January coming of age celebration period. Due to strong mainstream airplay in 2015, the song recharted on the main Japan Hot 100 chart at number 54.

== Track listings ==
All tracks are written by Yasutaka Nakata.

"Kimi ni 100 Percent" / "Furisodation" standard edition
No.	Title	Length
1.	"Kimi ni 100 Percent"	3:20
2.	"Furisodation"	4:05
3.	"Candy Candy (Extended Mix)"	5:16
Total length:		12:41

All tracks are written by Yasutaka Nakata.

"Kimi ni 100 Percent" / "Furisodation" Crayon Shin-chan edition
No.	Title	Length
1.	"Kimi ni 100 Percent"	3:20
2.	"Furisodation"	4:05
3.	"Candy Candy (Extended Mix)"	5:16
4.	"Kimi ni 100 Percent (Anime Version)"	1:06
Total length:		13:47

== Personnel ==
Personnel details were sourced from the "Kimi ni 100 Percent" / "Furisodation" liner notes booklet.

- Kyary Pamyu Pamyu – vocals
- Yasutaka Nakata – writer, arranger, producer, recorder, mixing, mastering
- Steve Nakamura – art director, designer
- Shinji Konishi – hair, make-up
- Takeshi Hanzawa – photographer
- Kumiko Iijima – stylist

== Chart rankings ==
Chart (2013)	Peak position
Japan Billboard Adult Contemporary Airplay	3
Japan Billboard Japan Hot 100	6
Japan Oricon weekly singles: "Kimi ni 100 Percent" / "Furisodation"	3
Taiwan G-Music East Asian releases: "Kimi ni 100 Percent" / "Furisodation"	6

=== Sales and certifications ===
Chart	Amount
Oricon physical sales: "Kimi ni 100 Percent" / "Furisodation"	34,000
RIAJ PC download certification	Gold (100,000)

== Release history ==
Region	Date	Format	Distributing Label	Catalog codes
Japan	January 1, 2013	ringtone	Unborde	
Japan	January 30, 2013	CD single, digital download	Unborde	WPCL-11288, WPCL-11289, WPCL-11293
South Korea	February 4, 2013	digital download	Warner Music Korea	
Taiwan	March 15, 2013	CD single	Warner Music Taiwan	5310-54360-2
