= Cream with a K =

British singer-songwriter, model, multi-instrumentalist, visual artist and mixer

- Born: Lee Tatlock
- Origin: London, United Kingdom
- Genres: Art Rock; alternative; grunge; J-POP
- Occupations: Singer-songwriter; model; visual artist; music video director
- Instruments: Vocals; guitar; bass guitar; drums
- Years active: 2009–present
- Labels: Independent, Universal Japan
- Formerly of: Neko Punch
- Website: creamwithak.com

Lee Tatlock, better known by her stage name Cream with a K, is a British singer-songwriter, model, multi-instrumentalist, visual artist and mixer from London United Kingdom. Tatlock was in the Japan-based bubblegum pop band Neko Punch from 2012 to 2017. She is fluent in both English and Japanese, and writes lyrics in both.

In 2013, Neko Punch won the EMI Revolution Rock Competition. Soon after, they were signed to Universal Japan and managed by the same agency as Kyary Pamyu Pamyu. Tatlock then began writing for other artists in both English and Japanese. Tatlock wrote all the songs and lyrics for Neko Punch, in addition to other Japanese Artists. Their major label album debuted June 2013 with the 1st Maxi-Single "Go Baby". It reached number 5 on iTunes alternative chart and was featured on iTunes top page.

After a chance meeting in Tokyo with one of her biggest inspirations, Beck, she decided it was time to reconnect with the West and make music that was better aligned to her new ideas and vision. Using Logic Pro X she writes, plays, arranges and produces her own music. Known in Japan as an influencer in fashion and art, she also styles, directs and create her own visual content and music videos.

Tatlock also was the host of a rock TV show on the Japanese channel NHK. She released her solo album on 14 May 2018, with a special CD release party in Tokyo. The album was recorded in Los Angeles at Servant Records, as opposed to London or Japan. She pre-released her first solo album on CD 14 May 2018 with a special CD release party in Tokyo. The CD album is exclusively available at Tower Records in Japan.
