= Mameshiba =

Mameshiba may refer to:

- Mameshiba (character) (豆しば) are any of a number of Japanese animation characters, each a legume with the face of a cartoon dog
- Mameshiba (song) (マメシバ) is the ninth single by Japanese singer Maaya Sakamoto
