= 100%KPP World Tour =

2013 concert tour by Kyary Pamyu Pamyu

- Tour by Kyary Pamyu Pamyu
- The official poster of the world tour
- Start date: February 9, 2013
- End date: May 30, 2013
- Legs: 4
- No. of shows: 13 in Asia; 3 in Europe; 2 in North America; 18 total

Kyary Pamyu Pamyu concert chronology
- Pamyu Pamyu Revolution Tour (2012); 100%KPP World Tour (2013); Nanda Collection World Tour (2014)

The 100%KPP World Tour was the debut world tour by Japanese singer Kyary Pamyu Pamyu. A documentary film based on the tour was released in theaters in Japan in July 2013.

== Tour dates ==
Date (2013)	City	Country	Venue
Europe
February 9	Brussels	Belgium	Vk* Concerts
February 10	Paris	France	La Cigale
February 13	London	England	O2 Academy Islington
Asia
March 2	Fukuoka	Japan	Zepp Fukuoka
March 3	Fukuoka	Japan	Zepp Fukuoka
March 15	Taipei	Taiwan	Legacy Taipei
March 17	Kowloon Bay	Hong Kong	Music Zone@E-Max
March 25	Tokyo	Japan	Zepp Tokyo
March 26	Tokyo	Japan	Zepp Tokyo
March 28	Osaka	Japan	Zepp Numba
March 29	Osaka	Japan	Zepp Numba
March 31	Hokkaido	Japan	Zepp Sapporo
April 4	Aichi	Japan	Zepp Nagoya
April 5	Aichi	Japan	Zepp Nagoya
North America
April 12	Los Angeles	United States	Club Nokia
April 14	New York City	United States	Best Buy Theater
Asia
May 10	Singapore		*SCAPE Warehouse
May 30	Shibuya	Japan	Shibuya Public Hall

=== Box office score data ===
Venue	City	Tickets Sold / Available	Gross Revenue
Club Nokia	Los Angeles	2,356 / 2,356 (100%)	$73,050

=== Cancelled dates ===
Date (2013)	City	Country	Venue	Reason
March 9	Seoul	South Korea	UNIQLO-AX	Unforeseen circumstances and prior commitments due to the release party of 2013 Global StarCraft II League Final and StarCraft II: Heart of the Swarm Global

== Reception ==
The tour received positive reviews. The Fader wrote "This was the rare pop concert that felt like a genuine celebration, even a victory dance." MTV Hive complimented Kyary's "enigmatic allure."
