= Kimi ni 100 Percent =

- "Shin-chan" edition cover of the "Kimi ni 100 Percent" / "Furisodation" single.

Single by Kyary Pamyu Pamyu

from the album Nanda Collection
- Released: January 25, 2013
- Recorded: October–November 2012
- Genre: J-pop
- Length: 3:20
- Label: Unborde
- Songwriter: Yasutaka Nakata
- Producer: Yasutaka Nakata

Kyary Pamyu Pamyu singles chronology
"Fashion Monster" (2012)	"Kimi ni 100 Percent" (2013)	"Furisodation" (2013)

"Kimi ni 100 Percent" (Japanese: キミに100パーセント, Hepburn: Kimi ni Hyaku Pāsento; "100% for You") is a song by Japanese pop singer Kyary Pamyu Pamyu. Used as the fifteenth opening theme song for the anime Crayon Shin-chan, it was released as a double A-side single alongside "Furisodation" on January 30, 2013. This also appears on Nanda Collection.

== Background and development ==
In May 2012, Kyary Pamyu Pamyu released her debut studio album Pamyu Pamyu Revolution, followed by the single "Fashion Monster" in October. Both releases were commercially successful, with the Recording Industry Association of Japan certifying Pamyu Pamyu Revolution gold and "Fashion Monster" platinum. On December 31, Kyary Pamyu Pamyu performed at the 63rd NHK Kōhaku Uta Gassen, her first appearance at the annual new year's music competition. Also in December, Kyary Pamyu Pamyu's 100% KPP World Tour 2013 was announced, beginning in Belgium in February.

The song was revealed on October 6, when Kyary Pamyu Pamyu announced the song's use in the anime during her performance at the TV Asahi Dream Festival. The "Kimi ni 100 Percent" / "Furisodation" single was announced in December. In 2014 for the film Crayon Shin-chan: Serious Battle! Robot Dad Strikes Back, a second song of hers was used for the theme song, "Family Party".

"Kimi ni 100 Percent" was written to have lyrics that would make children happy. Kyary Pamyu Pamyu found the melody simple to remember, so sung the song a lot smoother than she had in past recordings. The song is the second of hers to feature "100%" in the title, after "100% no Jibun ni" (100％のじぶんに, Hyaku Pāsento no Jibun ni), the B-side to her "Fashion Monster" single.

== Promotion and release ==
The song began being used in the opening sequences of Crayon Shin-chan in October 2012. The minute long clip of the song broadcast during the series was released as a digital download on December 7. Kyary Pamyu Pamyu made a cameo appearance on the January 25 episode of Crayon Shin-chan, voicing a character drawn in her likeness. On the same day, Kyary Pamyu Pamyu performed the song at Music Station live, alongside the characters of Crayon Shin-chan. This was the first time in the anime's 22-year history that program's characters had appeared to perform a song alongside a theme song's singer.

On January 28, an Asobisystem event held at AgeHa in Shin-Kiba, Tokyo was held to celebrate Kyary Pamyu Pamyu's 20th birthday, featuring performances by musicians such as Yasutaka Nakata, Ram Rider and Kyary Pamyu Pamyu herself. This was followed by a mini-tour, Kyary no 100% Pamyu Pamyu Live 2013 (きゃりーの100％ぱみゅぱみゅライブ 2013), featuring a performance in Tokyo on January 30 and two performances in Nagoya and Osaka on February 2.

Unlike Kyary Pamyu Pamyu's other singles, "Kimi ni 100 Percent" did not receive a music video.

== Cover artwork ==
In addition to the "Furisodation"-related single covers showing "Kyary as an adult", a Crayon Shin-chan version of the single was released. This edition features a caricature of Kyary Pamyu Pamyu in the same art style as the Crayon Shin-chan manga and anime, drawn by artist at the Groovisions design studio.

== Critical reception ==
Rolling Stone Japan reviewer Kazumi Nanba gave the "Kimi ni 100 Percent" / "Furisodation" single 3.5 stars out of five, calling the song "relaxed and light" and completely different to "Furisodation". He praised Kyary Pamyu Pamyu's vocal technique of not strictly matching the melody and very slightly differing as "technical" and felt it was a sign of Kyary Pamyu Pamyu's rapid growth as a vocalist. CDJournal reviewers described it as a "game pop song with Kyary's full-on charms", and felt that the song had a fairy tale feel, due to the "dance flavor" hiding away the darkness of the world.

== Track listings ==
All tracks are written by Yasutaka Nakata.

Digital download (anime version)
No.	Title	Length
1.	"Kimi ni 100 Percent" (anime version)	1:06
Total length:		1:06

All tracks are written by Yasutaka Nakata.

"Kimi ni 100 Percent" / "Furisodation" standard edition
No.	Title	Length
1.	"Kimi ni 100 Percent"	3:20
2.	"Furisodation"	4:05
3.	"Candy Candy" (extended mix)	5:16
Total length:		12:41

All tracks are written by Yasutaka Nakata.

"Kimi ni 100 Percent" / "Furisodation" Crayon Shin-chan edition
No.	Title	Length
1.	"Kimi ni 100 Percent"	3:20
2.	"Furisodation"	4:05
3.	"Candy Candy" (extended mix)	5:16
4.	"Kimi ni 100 Percent" (anime version)	1:06
Total length:		13:47

== Personnel ==
Personnel details were sourced from the "Kimi ni 100 Percent" / "Furisodation" liner notes booklet.

- Kyary Pamyu Pamyu – vocals
- Yasutaka Nakata – writer, arranger, producer, recorder, mixing, mastering

== Chart rankings ==
Charts (2013)	Peak position
Japan Billboard Adult Contemporary Airplay	11
Japan Billboard Japan Hot 100	2
Japan Oricon weekly singles: "Kimi ni 100 Percent" / "Furisodation"	3
Taiwan G-Music East Asian releases: "Kimi ni 100 Percent" / "Furisodation"	6

=== Sales and certifications ===
Chart	Amount
Oricon physical sales: "Kimi ni 100 Percent" / "Furisodation"	34,000
RIAJ digital download certification	Gold (100,000)

== Release history ==
Region	Date	Format	Distributing label	Catalog codes
Japan	December 2, 2012	Ringtone	Unborde	
Japan	December 7, 2012	Digital download (anime version)	Unborde	
Japan	January 25, 2013	digital download	Unborde	
Japan	January 30, 2013	CD single	Unborde	WPCL-11288, WPCL-11289, WPCL-11293
South Korea	February 4, 2013	Digital download	Warner Music Korea	
Taiwan	March 15, 2013	CD single	Warner Music Taiwan	5310-54360-2
