= Moshi Moshi Harajuku =

EP by Kyary Pamyu Pamyu
- Released: August 17, 2011
- Recorded: 2011
- Genre: J-pop, electropop
- Length: 21:22
- Label: Unborde (Warner Music Japan)
- Producer: Yasutaka Nakata

Kyary Pamyu Pamyu chronology
Kyary Pamyu Pamyu's Ghibli Set (2011)	Moshi Moshi Harajuku (2011)	Pamyu Pamyu Revolution (2012)

Singles from Moshi-Moshi Harajuku
- 1. "PonPonPon" Released: July 20, 2011; 2. "Jelly" Released: August 3, 2011

Moshi Moshi Harajuku (もしもし原宿, lit. "Hello Harajuku") is the first extended play by Japanese pop singer Kyary Pamyu Pamyu. All of the tracks were produced by Nakata Yasutaka of Capsule. It was released on August 17, 2011, in two editions: a limited edition with a photobook and a regular edition. The lead single "PonPonPon" was released digitally on July 20, 2011. A second single, "Jelly", was released on August 3 and is a cover of the Capsule song of the same name.

== Reception ==
Jun Yamamoto of hotexpress called the album "crazy, but cute", and highlighted "PonPonPon" and "Jelly" as the most notable songs.

== Track listing ==
All tracks are written by Yasutaka Nakata.

No.	Title	Length
1.	"Kyary no March" (きゃりーのマーチ, Kyarī no Māchi)	1:07
2.	"Cherry Bonbon" (チェリーボンボン, Cherī Bonbon)	3:38
3.	"Pon Pon Pon"	4:02
4.	"Chōdo Ii no" (ちょうどいいの)	3:19
5.	"Pinpon ga Nannai" (ピンポンがなんない)	4:44
6.	"Jelly" (Capsule cover)	4:32
Total length:		21:22

iTunes bonus track
No.	Title	Length
7.	"Pon Pon Pon" (extended version)	6:02
Total length:		27:24

== Personnel ==
Credits adapted from liner notes.

- Yasutaka Nakata – written, arranged, produced, recorded, mixed, mastered
- Steve Nakamura – art director
- Shinji Konishi – hair, make-up
- Eri Soyama – stylist

== Charts ==
Chart (2011)	Peak position
Japan Billboard Top Albums	15
Japan Oricon Weekly	18
