= Nanda Collection =

- Regular edition cover

Studio album by Kyary Pamyu Pamyu
- Released: June 26, 2013
- Recorded: October 2012–May 2013
- Genre: J-pop
- Length: 47:27
- Label: Unborde (Warner Music Japan)
- Producer: Yasutaka Nakata

Kyary Pamyu Pamyu chronology
Dokidoki Wakuwaku Pamyu Pamyu Revolution Land (2013)	Nanda Collection (2013)	Pika Pika Fantajin (2014)

Kyary Pamyu Pamyu studio album chronology
Pamyu Pamyu Revolution (2012)	Nanda Collection (2013)	Pika Pika Fantajin (2014)

Singles from Nanda Collection
- 1. "Fashion Monster" Released: October 17, 2012; 2. "Kimi ni 100 Percent / Furisodation" Released: January 30, 2013; 3. "Ninja Re Bang Bang" Released: March 20, 2013; 4. "Invader Invader" Released: May 15, 2013

Alternate cover
- Limited edition CD+DVD cover

Nanda Collection (なんだこれくしょん, Nandakorekushon; lit. "What's this collection") is the second full-length studio album by Japanese recording artist Kyary Pamyu Pamyu, release on June 26, 2013, by Warner Music Japan. The album debuted at number one in the Oricon Weekly Albums Chart, becoming the first chart topper release of Kyary's career as well as the first Yasutaka Nakata-produced album to do so since Perfume's JPN in 2011.

"Kimi ni 100 Percent" was used as the 15th opening theme for the 1992–Present anime series Crayon Shin-chan and "Ninja Re Bang Bang" was used for the 2016 American film Sing.

== Background and release ==
The title of the album is an invented portmanteau of the expression "nanda kore" (なんだこれ), meaning "what's this?" in Japanese, and "collection" (これくしょん, korekushon). The album was preceded by the release of the singles "Fashion Monster", "Kimi ni 100 Percent", "Furisodation", "Ninja Re Bang Bang" and "Invader Invader", which have all peaked within the top five of the Billboard Japan Hot 100.

The two songs on the album, "Kurakura" (くらくら) and "Noriko to Norioo" (のりことのりお) were used in commercials for KFC's Krushers and the mobile phone company au, respectively.

The album was announced on May 23, 2013, in two editions: a regular edition and a limited edition which comes with a bonus DVD containing the music videos for the lead singles. Two cover arts for the album were revealed on the same day. The regular edition cover is a "couple" shot of Pamyu Pamyu with a puppet styled after her, while the limited edition cover shows her covered in peacock feathers. Pamyu Pamyu commented, "[...] It would make so happy if the picture for the limited edition made you mutter, 'What the!?'"

The album debuted at number one in Japan and performed strongly around the globe. In the United States, the album debuted at number 2 on the Billboard Top World Albums chart, the chart that tracks the best-selling world music albums in the US. In Taiwan, the album debuted in the Top 10 of the G-Music J-Pop Albums Chart. Upon its release internationally, the album topped the iTunes charts of several countries and within the Top 10 and Top 20 of numerous others.

== Reception ==
Online webzine Pitchfork Media awarded the album a 6.6 out of 10, stating that the album "isn't for everyone" and that "If you can handle the barrage of synthesizer marching bands, PS1-era video game noises, and Kyary’s overwhelming kawaii-ness, Nanda Collection is a fascinating listen." Tinymixtapes awarded the album 4 out of 5, writing "Nanda Collection is not simply J-pop par excellence. It is J-pop personified. It is a multi-faceted, hyperdimensional prism simultaneously articulating, parodying, and problematizing a genre, a moment, a culture. Which is why we ought to be paying particular attention."

== Promotion ==
=== Nanda Collection World Tour ===
In September 2013, Kyary announced her second world tour from February until June 2014, showcasing the album. The All tour dates of the North American leg were sold out in February 2014. The world tour featured her debut concert in Australia and Germany.

== Track listing ==
All tracks are written by Yasutaka Nakata.

CD
No.	Title	Length
1.	"Nanda Collection" (なんだこれくしょん Nandakorekushon)	0:47
2.	"Ninja Re Bang Bang" (にんじゃりばんばん Ninjaribanban)	4:26
3.	"Kimi ni 100 Percent" (キミに100パーセント)	3:20
4.	"Super Scooter Happy" (Capsule cover)	5:54
5.	"Invader Invader" (インベーダーインベーダー)	4:11
6.	"Mi" (み)	4:12
7.	"Fashion Monster" (ファッションモンスター)	4:37
8.	"Saigo no Ice Cream" (さいごのアイスクリーム Saigo no Aisukurimu)	4:10
9.	"Noriko to Norio" (のりことのりお)	3:17
10.	"Furisodation" (ふりそでーしょん Furisodeshon)	4:06
11.	"Kura Kura" (くらくら)	2:49
12.	"Otona na Kodomo" (おとななこども)	5:31
Total length:		47:27

Limited edition bonus DVD
No.	Title	Length
1.	"Fashion Monster (music video)" (ファッションモンスター)
2.	"Furisodeshon (music video)" (ふりそでーしょん)
3.	"Ninja Re Bang Bang (music video)" (にんじゃりばんばん)
4.	"Invader Invader (music video)" (インベーダーインベーダー)

== Charts ==
=== Oricon ===
Oricon Chart	Peak	Debut Sales	Sales Total	Certification
Daily Albums Chart	1	44,221 (first day sales)	268,000	Platinum (+250,000)
Weekly Albums Chart	1	126,074	268,000	Platinum (+250,000)
Monthly Albums Chart	3	126,074	268,000	Platinum (+250,000)
Yearly Albums Chart	19	250,490	268,000	Platinum (+250,000)

== Personnel ==
Credits adapted from liner notes.

- Yasutaka Nakata – written, played, arranged, produced, recorded, mixed, mastered
- Steve Nakamura – art director, designer
- Takeshi Hanzawa – photographer
- Shinji Konishi – hair, make-up
- Kumiko Iijima – stylist
- Keiko Nakayama – prop character
- Tadashi Matsuyama, Masayo Kuroda – products coordinator
- Yusuke Nakagawa, Kei Ishizaka – executive producer
- Tsuyoshi Ishii – general producer
- Ryoma Suzuki – label head
- Satoru Yamazaki – artist management
- Harumi Ito – a&r
