= Kyary Pamyu Pamyu =

Japanese singer and model

- きゃりーぱみゅぱみゅ
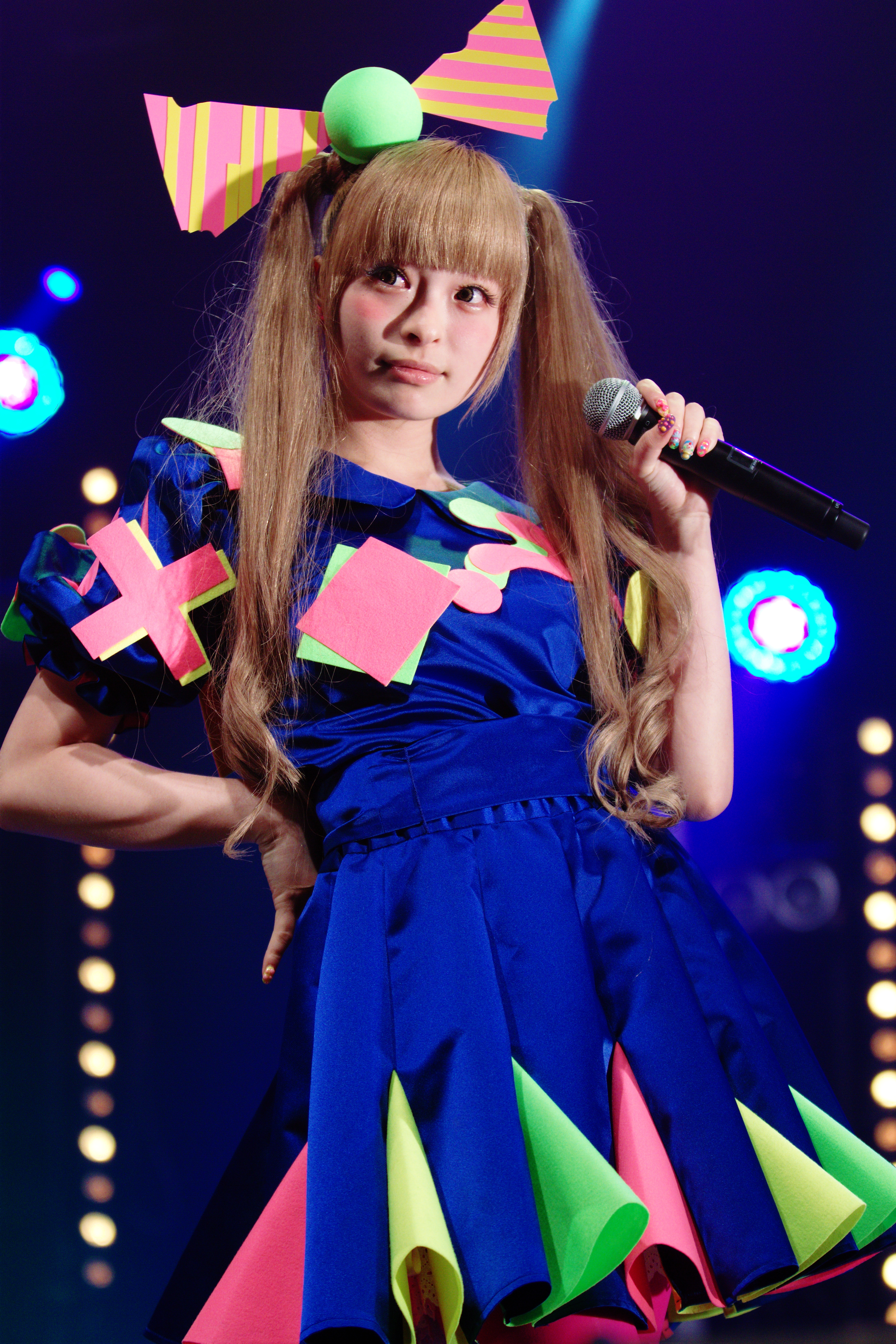
- Kyary Pamyu Pamyu performing at the Japan Expo in July 2012
- Born: Kiriko (桐子); January 29, 1993 (age 33); Tokyo, Japan
- Other names: Caroline Charonplop; Kyary
- Occupations: Singer; model
- Agent: Asobisystem
- Height: 157 cm (5 ft 2 in)
- Spouse: Shono Hayama (m. 2023)
- Children: 1
- Musical career
- Genres: J-pop; EDM; electronica; electropop; synth-pop; bubblegum pop; dance-pop; techno
- Instrument: Vocals
- Years active: 2010–present
- Labels: Dim Mak; KRK Lab; Sire; Unborde; Warner
- Website: kyary.asobisystem.com

Kiriko Takemura (桐子, Kiriko; born January 29, 1993), known professionally as Kyary Pamyu Pamyu (Hiragana: きゃりーぱみゅぱみゅ), is a Japanese singer, model and tarento. Since her debut in 2011, her public image has been closely associated with Japan's kawaii and decora culture, centered on the Harajuku youth fashion scene from which she emerged. Her music has been written and produced by musician Yasutaka Nakata throughout her career.

Her 2011 debut single "Pon Pon Pon" reached the top ten of Japan's Oricon Singles Chart and was followed by the EP Moshi Moshi Harajuku. Her debut studio album Pamyu Pamyu Revolution (2012) followed, featuring the successful singles "Tsukematsukeru" and "Candy Candy". Further successful singles have included "Fashion Monster", "Kimi ni 100 Percent", Furisodeshon", "Ninja Re Bang Bang" and "Invader Invader", among others. Kyary has since released four further studio albums: Nanda Collection (2013), Pika Pika Fantajin (2014), Japamyu (2018), and Candy Racer (2021).

Though most of her success as a recording artist has been in Asia, she has also gained popularity in Western countries due to her music videos going viral. Kyary has also found success as a model and Japanese television personality.

As of February 2020, Kyary had sold over 970,000 physical albums and singles in Japan, in addition to over 2.25 million downloads of her singles.

== Early life ==
Kyary Pamyu Pamyu was born in Nishitōkyō, Tokyo, Japan, in a traditional strict household. She started modeling and appearing as a junior idol when she was just 12 years old, using her real name, Kiriko Takemura. She writes in her autobiography, Oh! My God!! Harajuku Girl, that her father was more supportive of her, although they had their fair share of quarrels.

== Career ==
=== 2009–2010: Career beginnings ===
Kyary started as a fashion blogger, and then began her professional career as a model for Harajuku fashion magazines such as Kera! and Zipper.

Her stage name combines "Kyari" (acquired in school because she embraced Western culture and seemed "like a foreign girl", shortened from Kyariko, derived from her given name Kiriko), and the later-added "Pamyu Pamyu" because it sounded cute. She was inspired to sing by Yasutaka Nakata.

=== 2011–2012: Moshi Moshi Harajuku and Pamyu Pamyu Revolution ===
In April 2011 Kyary participated in the charity event "One Snap for Love" to benefit victims of the 2011 Tōhoku earthquake and tsunami. In July, she released her first promo single, "PonPonPon", citing Gwen Stefani, Katy Perry and Lady Gaga as inspirations at that time. The music video, a psychedelic tribute to kawaisa and Decora culture, was released to YouTube and became a viral hit. "PonPonPon" entered Billboard Japan's Hot 100 chart at 72 on July 31, 2011. Her debut EP, Moshi Moshi Harajuku, was released August 17, 2011, followed a week later by her autobiography, Oh! My God!! Harajuku Girl.

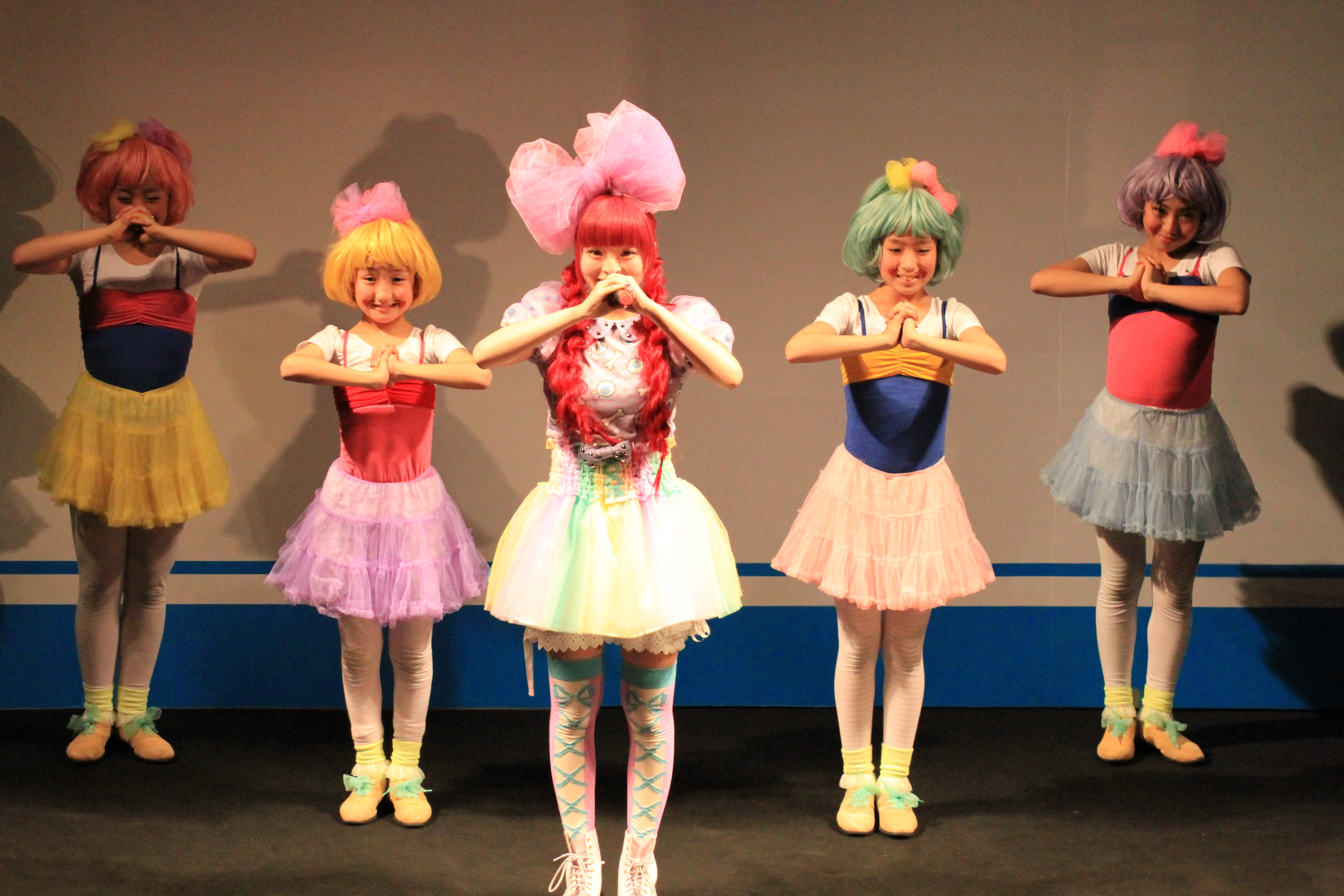
Kyary performing at the 4th Okinawa International Movie Festival in 2012

On December 6, 2011, her single "Tsukematsukeru" was digitally released internationally via iTunes. On December 9, Kyary made her American debut in Culver City, California to perform in a fashion show and play two of her songs, as well as her first time performing the single. "Tsukematsukeru" was released physically on January 11, 2012, which included a special edition photobook. It was eventually certified gold in April 2012. In February and March 2012, she represented Japan during Japanese performing arts exhibitions in Shanghai and Hong Kong. She released her second single, "Candy Candy", as a digital download on March 14, 2012. The single debuted at eighty-nine on the Billboard Japan Hot 100, and later peaked at number two. It was released as a CD single on April 4, 2012, and sold 9,913 copies its first week, debuting at number eight on the Oricon weekly singles chart.

Her debut full-length album, Pamyu Pamyu Revolution, was released on May 23, 2012. Along with the announcement of her second single back in February, it was revealed that she was planning to hold her first nationwide tour in June of that year, as well as launching an official fan club. The tour kicked off on June 2 at the Namba Hatch in Osaka. It continued in Hiroshima, Nagoya, Sendai, Sapporo, Fukuoka and finished in Tokyo on June 29. In July 2012, she made her European debut by performing for 13,000 fans at the Japan Expo in Paris. Kyary was bestowed the title of "Kawaii Harajuku Ambassador" on August 30, 2012, by the Mayor of Shibuya. Following a montage of her successes performed on a large screen, she performed several songs in front of a crowd after accepting the award. In early September 2012, Kyary announced that she was collaborating with Japanese budget fashion brand g.u. for her new single "Fashion Monster", which was given a CD release date of October 17, 2012. She was also used as the image character for G.U. after the announcement. Around the same time, Kyary announced her debut world tour titled 100% KPP World Tour, which began in February 2013 and lasted until June. The tour visited the United States, United Kingdom, France, Belgium, Taiwan, Thailand, Singapore, Hong Kong, and her native Japan.

=== 2013–2014: Nanda Collection and Pika Pika Fantajin ===
During 2012 and 2013, she began receiving more attention in Western media. Sputnikmusic listed Pamyu Pamyu Revolution as number one on their "Best Pop Albums of 2012" list. Britain's Dazed & Confused magazine became an enthusiastic supporter. Kyary was photographed by Matt Irwin for the magazine's December 2012 issue, styled by Nicola Formichetti. The magazine also cited her video for "Furisodation" in their "Video of the Week" category in January 2013, and named her "The Star of Tomorrow" in August. In January 2013, MTV Iggy called Kyary "the coolest girl on the planet" and The Fader called her "the most exciting person making music". Furisodeshon's video was also named by Stereogum as a "Video of the Week" in January. Elle France promoted Kyary Pamyu Pamyu in its February 2013 issue, and she appeared on the French television show Le Petit Journal on February 11. During this period, she also appeared in the Swedish newspaper Svenska Dagbladet and was interviewed on the British radio station Monocle 24. February also saw the release of Kyary's first concert DVD/Blu-ray, Dokidoki Wakuwaku Pamyu Pamyu Revolution Land, recorded live in November 2012 at the Nippon Budokan in Tokyo. A month-long exhibition in March 2013 titled "Kyary Pamyu Pamuseum" was held in Tokyo's Roppongi Hills complex, showcasing all costumes from her music videos and live performances. In April, a deal for American distribution was reached with Sire Records, and "Fashion Monster" was re-released in the United States. In summer 2013, Pamyu Pamyu's television series TV John! was broadcast in France on the Nolife channel. In America, Paper featured her in its July issue, and she received her largest American exposure to date in a lengthy profile in The Wall Street Journal the same month.

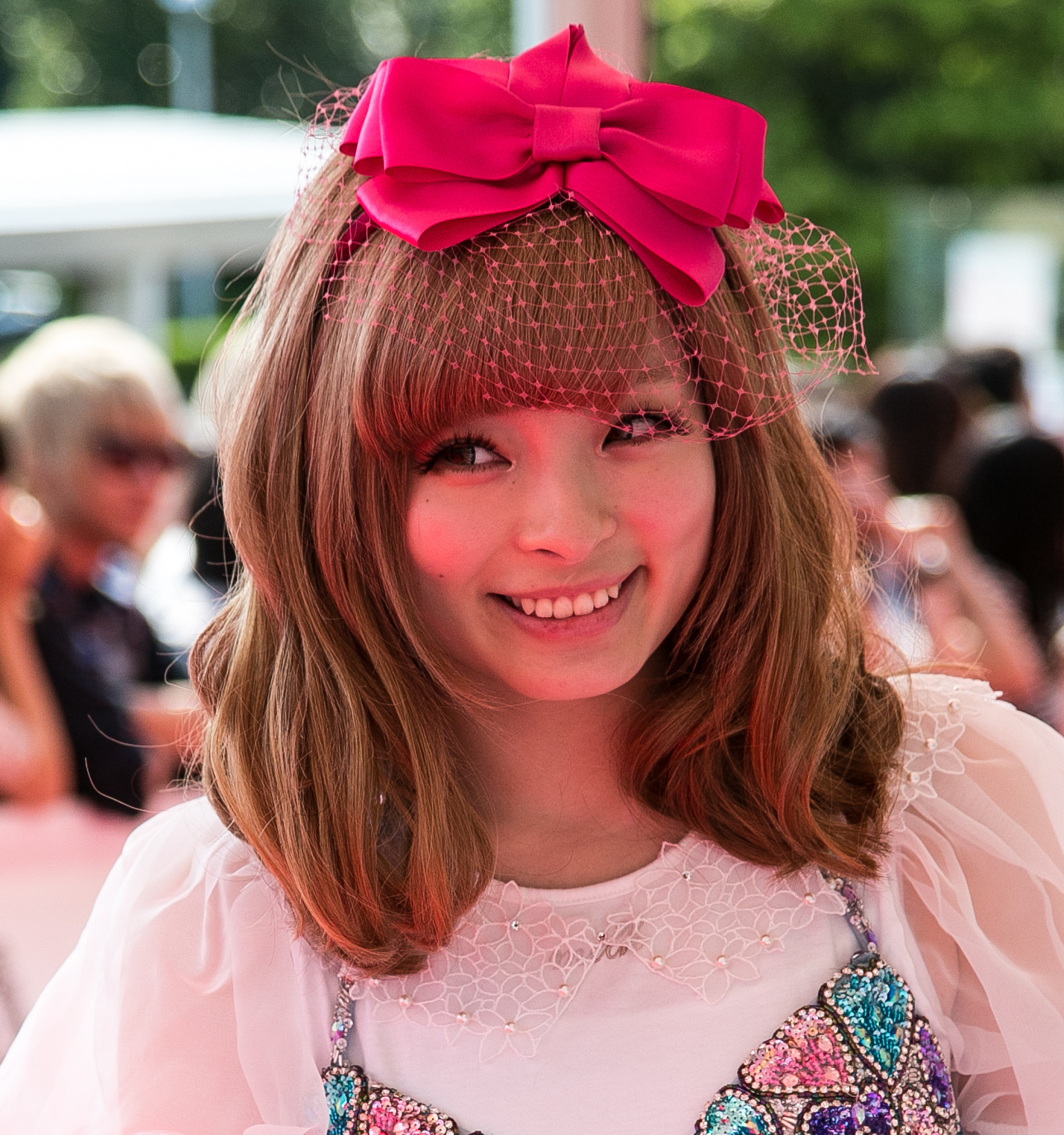
Kyary Pamyu Pamyu at the 2014 MTV Video Music Awards Japan red carpet

Kyary performed her songs "Invader Invader" and "Ninja Re Bang Bang" at the end ceremony for the 2013 MTV Video Music Awards Japan Awards, where she also received the awards for Best Pop Video and Best Karaoke! Song for "Fashion Monster". In late June, it was revealed that she was working on a documentary film entitled Kyary Pamyu Pamyu the Movie. The film received a one-day limited screening and featured concert footage from Kyary Pamyu Pamyu's 100% KPP World Tour. Internationally the same year, she was nominated for Best New International Pop Artist by Fuse TV and Best Japan Act at the 2013 MTV Europe Music Awards. Kyary's second studio album, Nanda Collection, was released on June 26, 2013. In September 2013, she announced a second world tour titled Nanda Collection World Tour and a new single "Mottai Night Land" was released in late October and received positive reviews from Western media outlets. The single was released on November 6. The world tour visited the United States, Canada, Australia, England, France, Germany, Taiwan, Thailand, Singapore, Hong Kong, and Kyary's native Japan, lasting from February until November. It was originally to last until June but was postponed due to political unrest. She was interviewed by or was the focus of articles in internationally renowned publications such as The Guardian, Time Out London, Sydney Morning Herald, and VICE. in April 2014, Kyary made her Australian television debut on the program Sunrise and was the focus of Australian news programs such as ABC News. In May 2014, she appeared in the British fashion magazine i-D. In July 2014, Vogue premiered Kyary's first English-language song, "Ring A Bell," in the United States. In October 2014, she was the focus of an article and photoshoot in the American fashion magazine Nylon.

In February 2014, Kyary announced her single "Yume no Hajima Ring Ring" in which her theme would be "evolution" which provides a theme relating to graduation. The music video was uploaded to YouTube on February 19. The single was released on February 26. In March, she announced that her upcoming single "Family Party" will be used as an ending theme for the movie Crayon Shin-chan: Serious Battle! Robot Dad Strikes Back. Kyary has stated that this is her first original theme song for a film. "Family Party" was released on April 16. On May 9, she announced her first limited-run single, "Kira Kira Killer", which was released on June 11. The single was featured in commercials for au's "Lucky" campaign. Also in May, Dazed & Confused announced that Kyary was working with international musicians Sophie and Yelle on new upcoming music. she announced at her Zepp Tokyo concert that she would be releasing her third full album, titled Pika Pika Fantajin on July 9, 2014. Along with the album announcement on May 18, Kyary also announced that she would be holding an arena tour after her hall tour in Japan. Both nationwide tours were held after the Nanda Collection World Tour. The Hall tour consisted of 17 shows in 13 cities, visiting Saitama, Tokyo, Miyagi, Matsudo, Hokkaido, Tochigi, Niigata, Ishikawa, Yamanashi, Chiba, Hiroshima, Kagawa, and Aichi, and lasting from July 27 until September 22. The arena tour consisted of nine shows in five cities, which ran from October 18 to November 9, visiting the cities of Makuhari, Osaka, Nagoya, Fukuoka, and Yoyogi.

=== 2015–2016: KPP Best ===
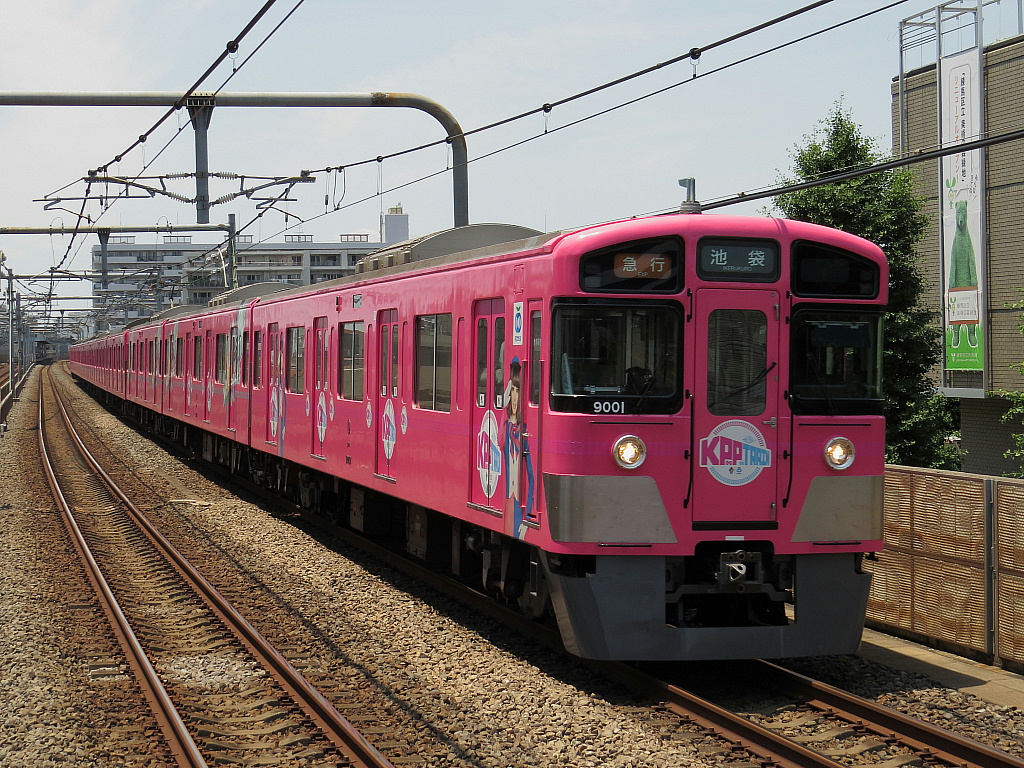
The Seibu KPP Train in 2016, Seibu 9000 series

In January 2015, she was mentioned by The Hollywood Reporter as one of the "major recent sellers" for Warner Music Group alongside artists including Coldplay and Ed Sheeran. In March 2015, Kyary released her single "Mondai Girl". In June, she was chosen by the international cosmetic brand MAC Cosmetics as one of its "Global Heroes" and was profiled in an interview on their website. In the following month, Kyary was chosen to represent Japan in Italy at Expo 2015. On June 17, 2015, a release of the movie Nutcracker Fantasy with a remix of her song "Oyasumi" as the theme song. On September 2, 2015, Kyary released the Halloween-themed single "Crazy Party Night (Pumpkin no Gyakushū)" and began the Crazy Party Night 2015 Tour, a nationwide concert tour that lasted until December 2015. The music video for the single premiered beforehand on August 20, 2016 and has since amassed over thirteen million views as of May 2018. On October 11, 2015, she played a one-off international concert at The Roundhouse in London, England. In November 2015, Kyary was featured prominently in advertising for "The World Goes Pop" exhibition at the Tate Modern national art gallery in London.

On May 25, 2016, her debut compilation album KPP Best was released, featuring her single "Sai & Co" which was released on April 20. Around that time, Kyary announced a third world tour titled the Five Years Monster World Tour. The world tour visited Singapore, London, Sydney, Melbourne, San Francisco, New York City, Taipei, and Tokyo. Her first art exhibition titled the Kyary Pamyu Pamyu Artwork Exhibition 2011–2016 was held at Laforet Harajuku from December 16. In addition to every CD jacket design being present at the event, over 100 images were displayed, including photos from Kyary's photobooks that were available exclusively within her album releases, outfits and wigs worn by Pamyu Pamyu herself, interactive displays of the jacket images, and more. In conjunction with the exhibition was released the book "Kyary Pamyu Pamyu Art Works 2011–2016", compiling around 300 unseen images from her photobooks. It was Kyary's first release together with art director and designer Steve Nakamura, who has been responsible for the art direction of Kyary's releases since her debut in 2011.

=== 2017–2018: Japamyu ===
On December 27, 2016, she announced that she would be collaborating with English singer Charli XCX on Yasutaka Nakata's solo track "Crazy Crazy". The song was released on January 18, 2017, followed later in January by her single "Harajuku Iyahoi". In April 2017, Kyary released the single "Easta". From August 12, 2017 to October 1, 2017, the Kyary Pamyu Pamyu Art Exhibition 2011–2016 was held in Taipei. Kyary also embarked on a tour titled The Spooky Obakeyashiki: Pumpkins Strike Back in 2017. The following year, she performed at six international concerts in London, Cologne, Berlin, New York, San Francisco, and Los Angeles as The Spooky Obakeyashiki World Tour. In an interview with Billboard Japan, Pamyu Pamyu stated that although her music and performance style have evolved, she hopes to "maintain that basic 'kawaii' side" which her music and style is known for. She released the single "Kimino Mikata" on April 11, 2018, along with an accompanying music video.

In September 2018, Kyary released her fourth studio album Japamyu, her first studio album in four years. The album included her 2016 single "Sai & Kou" as well as "Harajuku Iyahoi" and "Kimino Mikata". Kyary performed a new song from the album titled "Kizunami" on Music Station on September 7. On that same year, her contract with WMG expired.

=== 2019–present: Candy Racer ===
On March 20, 2019, Kyary announced a new concert tour, "Oto no Kuni Live Tour", which commenced on March 30 at Izumo-taisha Shrine in Shimane. On May 10, she released an independent digital single "Kimi ga Iine Kuretara" as a tie-up song to the Japanese drama Mukai no Bazuru Kazoku. In January 2020, Kyary was announced as a performer at Coachella 2020 in Indio, California. Due to the COVID-19 pandemic, the "Kamaitachi Tour" was cancelled and overseas shows were also postponed. Unable to perform live during the pandemic, Kyary made available a curated selection of her past live concerts on YouTube from April 14 to May 17, 2020.

Kyary released a digital single "Kamaitachi" on April 24, 2020, with its accompanying music video premiering on YouTube the same day. On September 12, 2020, Kyary Pamyu Pamyu launched her new fragrance brand "Nostalgia Syndrome". The brand was backed by a crowdfunding campaign in February 2020 for Kyary who wanted to turn her favourite scent, fragrant olive, into a fragrance. October 18, 2020, she released, exclusively at her store, a limited edition DVD / Blu-ray of her 2 performances of "Otonokuni Live Tour 2019", inspired on Kabuki theatre. On October 31, 2020, Kyary held the online concert "Kyary Pamyu Pamyu Online Halloween Live 2020 「THE FAMILY 10.31」", later available exclusively at "smash". streaming service, re-edited into a vertical image.

On January 29, 2021, Kyary released a digital single "Gum Gum Girl" under her newly established label KRK Lab. On April 17, 2021, it was released the video of "Kyary Pamyu Pamyu Premium Live: Great Invitation" held at EX THEATER ROPPONGI in Tokyo as a free video service "GyaO!" It was revealed that it will be exclusively distributed from April 30 (Friday) on Softbank's content distribution service "5G LAB". Live footage carefully selected from the performance on the day of the two-part system is not only delivered in normal 2D (GYAO!), But also in 3D free-viewpoint footage (VR SQUARE) with a back dancer and a luxurious stage set. It will be delivered in various variations such as multi-angle video (FR SQUARE) that can be viewed from various angles such as from the front or side of. Her 5th album Candy Racer was released on October 27, 2021. On November 1, 2021, Kyary released a science-based hair care brand named "Curuput". Her goal is to create a future where everybody, including Kyary herself, can dye their hair freely, without the worry of damage.

On January 8, 2022, Kyary released a digital single "Maybe Baby", used as opening theme of Ninjala anime series. On January 16, 2022, she began the "Kyary Pamyu Pamyu 10th ANNIVERSARY JAPAN TOUR 2022 CANDY WAVE", the largest tour in the history of Kyary. The European leg of the tour, which was to occur in November 2022 was cancelled in Germany, with further dates in Paris and London still being reviewed.

== Personal life ==
On March 21, 2023, Kyary announced on social media that she married actor and Terrace House studio commentator Shono Hayama on an undisclosed date.

On April 22, 2024, Kyary announced in a social media post that she is expecting her first child. She announced the birth of her child on October 7, 2024.

=== Public image ===
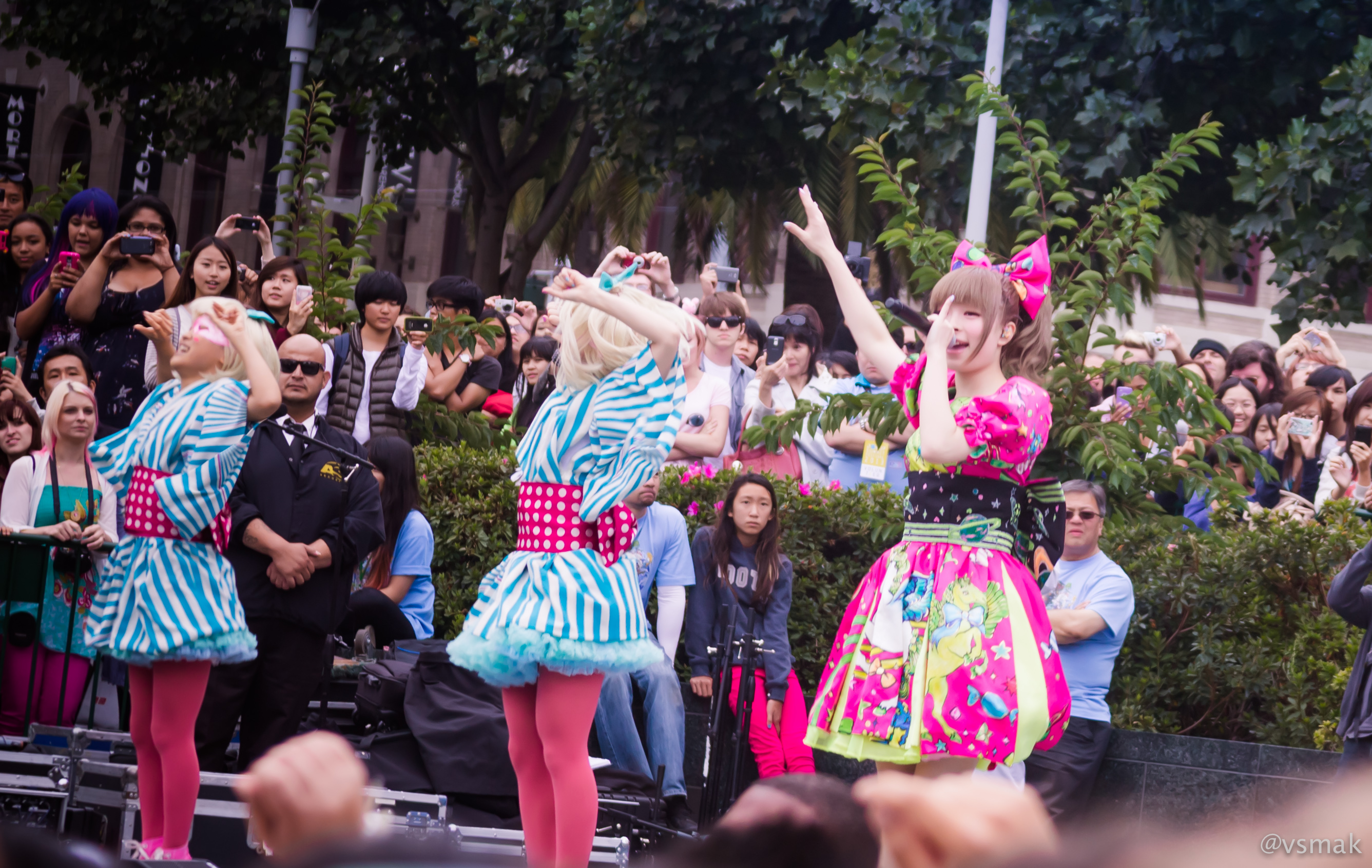
Kyary performing at J-Pop Summit in San Francisco, July 2013

As a musical entertainer, Kyary Pamyu Pamyu has been recognized as the "J-Pop Princess" or "Harajuku Pop Princess".

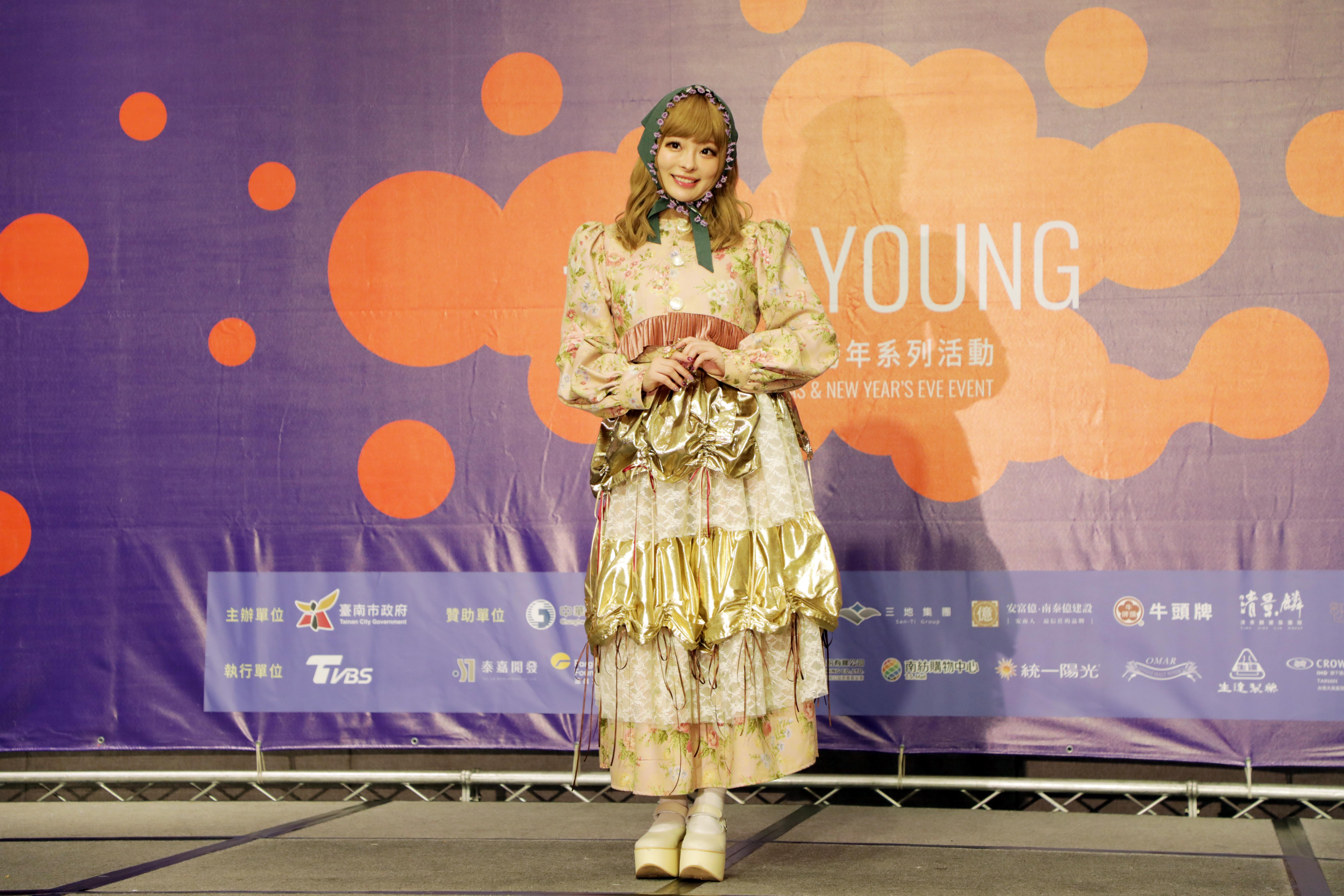
Kyary Pamyu Pamyu at Tainan, 2024

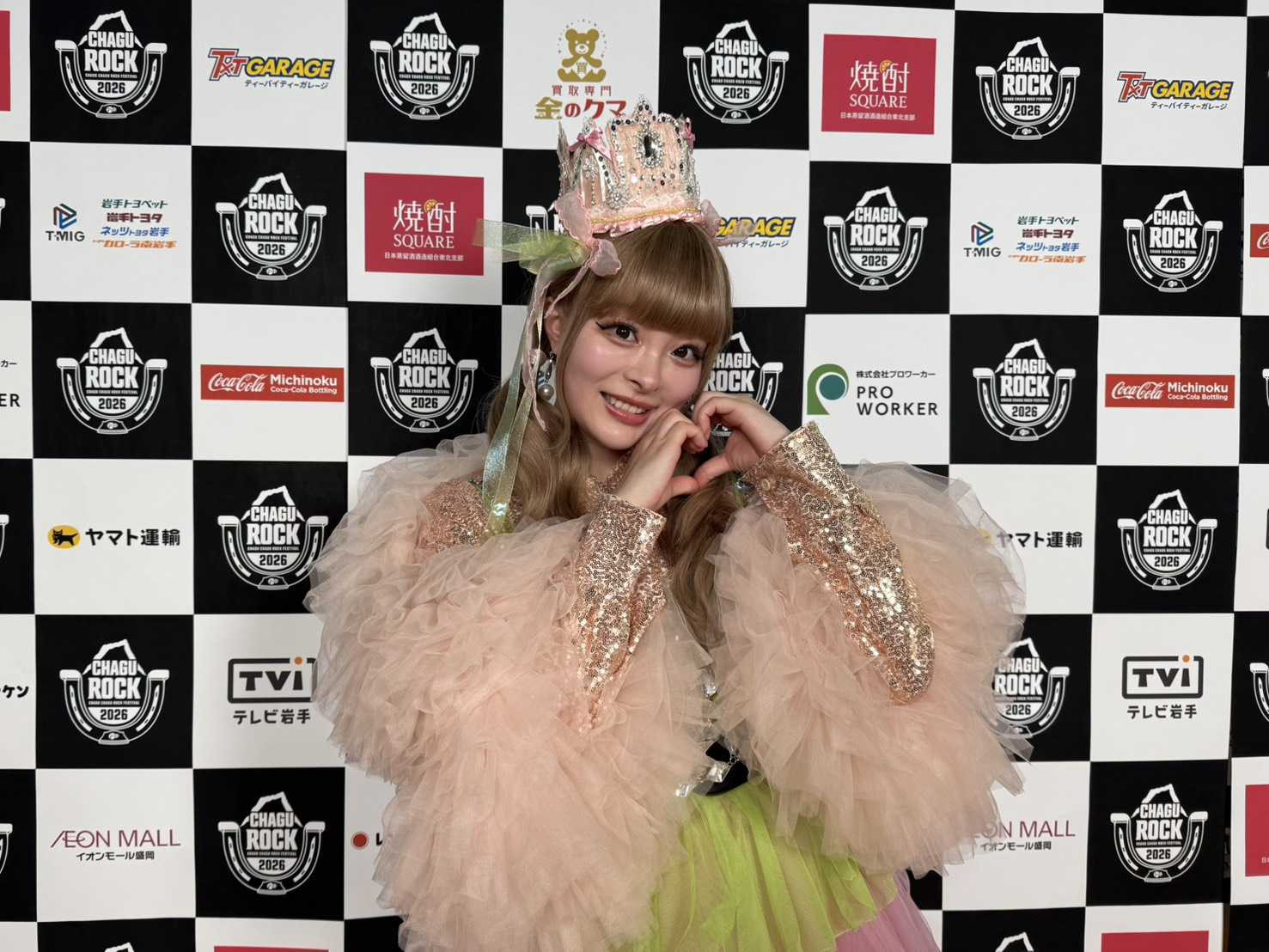
Kyary Pamyu Pamyu in 2026

Her fashion sense is the subject of much media coverage. Kyary is often called "Japan's Lady Gaga", citing her similar use of fashion to attract attention. She has cited American singers Gwen Stefani, Katy Perry, and Lady Gaga as her inspirations in both music and fashion. Kyary's fashion sense has also been criticized. While being interviewed on TV Asahi's Music Station, she was wearing an oversized ribbon on her head, which blocked Japanese boy band Kanjani8 from being seen on camera, angering fans of Kanjani8. She later stated that when she is being interviewed on television, she would restrict what she is wearing. Kyary's fans, however, defended her wearing the outfit. Kyary cites "kawaii" (meaning "cute" or "cuteness") as her background style.

Her international success has also received much attention. During an interview with The Fader, Kyary was asked if she meant to make music outside of Asia, where she responded; "At first, I didn't think about global markets at all. But even in Japanese, my lyrics don't make any sense and have a kind of mystery, like on "Pon Pon Pon" and "Tsukematsukeru". I can feel that what I'm doing in Japanese is catchy to global audiences anyway." Keiichi Ishizaka, chairman and CEO of Warner Music Japan Inc, commented on her image to The Japan Times, saying "[Kyary] is a person who came directly out of Tokyo's Harajuku culture, and there is a growing international interest in Japan's kawaii culture." Many critics and publications noted the increase in popularity of Japanese pop culture outside Japan, such as its fashion and animation, and Kyary's role as its global ambassador. Ishizaka believed that with the advent of the Internet, there is no difference in time and distance among countries anymore." Seibu Railway honored her by running a train on the Seibu Ikebukuro Line, part of their Seibu 9000 series, from June to September 2016, themed on the pop star's music videos, which also passed through her birthplace Nishitōkyō, Tokyo.

== Trivia ==
Many of Kyary's singles, including "Candy Candy", "Invader Invader", and "Fashion Monster", have generated millions of views on YouTube. Her single "Furisodation" generated minor controversy in Japan, where a citizens' group believed the video encouraged alcohol and smoking, a claim which her label denied.

== Filmography ==
=== Film ===
Year	Title	Role	Network	Notes
2013	Kyary Pamyu Pamyu the Movie	Herself	Movie	Documentary
2014	Kyary Pamyu Pamyu Cinema John!	Herself	Movie	
2020	Crayon Shin-chan: Clash! Graffitingdom and Nearly Four Heroes	Princess of Scribble Kingdom	Movie	Voice
2021	People Just Do Nothing: Big in Japan	Herself	Movie	Performer

=== Television ===
Year	Title	Role	Network	Notes
2011	Kyary Pamyu Pamyu TV John!	Herself/host	Nagoya TV	Japanese variety show
2011–2013	Space Shower Area	Herself / VJ	Space Shower TV	Program about music
2012	Catherine	Herself/host	Kansai TV	Japanese variety show
2012–2013	Catherine the Third	Herself/host	Kansai TV	Japanese variety show
2012	Kazoku no Uta	Herself	Fuji TV	Japanese drama / episode 1
2013	Crayon Shin-chan	Herself	TV Asahi	Anime / voice on episode 793
2013–2020	Nanda Kore TV with Kyary Pamyu Pamyu	Herself / MC	Space Shower TV	Monthly Japanese variety show
2014	Kyary Pamyu Pamyu TV-John!	Herself/host	United Television Broadcasting Systems	Japanese variety show with subtitles
2014–2015	Moshi Moshi Nippon	Herself / MC	NHK World	Bimonthly Japanese variety show
2015	Mondai No Aru Restaurant	Herself	Fuji TV	Japanese drama / episode 10
2015–present	Sekai no Nanda Kore!? Mystery	Herself/host	Fuji TV	Weekly Japanese variety show
2015	Moshi Moshi Nippon TV	Herself / MC	NHK World	Bimonthly Japanese variety show
2018	uBabibbevodi	Herself	NHK Educational TV	Children's medical program, 1 episode
2018–present	u&i	Metchaca	NHK Educational TV	Fairy's voice on program for disabled child
2019	Mukai no Bazuru Kazoku	Herself	ytv	Japanese drama / episode 7
2019	Songs of Tokyo	Herself	NHK World	Japanese music and culture / episode 5
2021	Creator's File: GOLD	Herself	Netflix	Mockumentary / episode 5
2023–present	Eigo de Asobo Meets the World	Shinmai Magician Kyary	NHK Educational TV	English educational program

=== Website ===
Year	Title	Role	Network	Notes
2010–2012	Kyary Pamyu Pamyu no Way-Way Channel	Herself/ Host	Niconico	Niconico Douga channel
2012–2013	Dam Channel!	Herself/ MC	Club Dam	Karaoke system program
2012–2013	Catherine the Thirteenth	Herself/host	Kansai TV	YouTube channel / Japanese variety show
2012–present	Harajuku Kawaii!! TV	Herself	Harajuku Kawaii!! TV	YouTube channel / blog
2015–2016	Kyary Pamyu Pamyu Goes Pop	Herself	The EY Exhibition: The World Goes Pop	Video collaboration at art exhibition
2021–present	LINE NEWS VISION "What is Kyary Pamyu Pamyu's political correctness !?"	Herself / co-host	LINE NEWS VISION	LINE variety show
2021–present	dTV Presents KPP and Bose Everyone's After School	Herself / co-host	dTV	dTV variety show

=== Radio ===
Year	Title	Role	Network	Notes
2012–2015	Kyary Pamyu Pamyu Way Way Radio!	Herself/host	TBS	Part of the radio program "Kakiiin"
2015–2018	Kyary Locks!	Herself/host	TFM	Part of the radio program "School of Lock!", Monthly – Thursdays
2019–present	Kyary Pamyu Pamyu no Nantoka Pan Pan Radio	Herself/host	JFN	Co-host with Masaru Ikeda
2021–present	Kyary Pamyu Pamyu Chapter # 0 ~ Touch Your Heart ~	Herself/host	TFM	

=== Collaborations ===
Year	Title	Role	Organization	Notes
2016	Kyary Pamyu Pamyu XR	Herself/Lead	Universal Studios Japan	First modern VR roller-coaster as part of KPP 5-year anniversary

== Discography ==
- Pamyu Pamyu Revolution (2012)
- Nanda Collection (2013)
- Pika Pika Fantajin (2014)
- Japamyu (2018)
- Candy Racer (2021)

== Tours ==
- Pamyu Pamyu Revolution Tour (2012)
- 100%KPP World Tour 2013 (2013)
- Nanda Collection Tour 〜Kyary Pamyu Pamyu No Uchu Theatre〜 (2013)
- Kpp Nanda Collection World Tour 2014 (2014)
- Pika Pika Fantajin Tour -Kyary Pamyu Pamyu No Kumo No Ue No Heaven's Door- (2014)
- KPP 2014 JAPAN ARENA TOUR Kyary Pamyu Pamyu No Colorful Panic TOY BOX (2014)
- Japan Hall Tour Crazy Party Night 2015 (2015)
- Kyary Pamyu Pamyu 5iVE YEARS MONSTER World Tour (2016)
- SPECIAL DJ×LIVE ZEPP TOUR 2016 ～YSTK×KPP 〜 (2016)
- KPP JAPAN IYAHOI TOUR 2017 (2017)
- Kyary Pamyu Pamyu 2018 World Tour - THE SPOOKY OBAKEYASHIKI- (2018)
- Japamyu Hall Tour 2018 Hoshikuzu No Cherry Martini (2018)
- Kyary Pamyu Pamyu Oto No Kuni Live Tour (2019)
- SPECIAL DJ×LIVE TOUR 2020 YSTK×KPP Vol.02 (2020)
- KPP 10th Anniversary Japan Tour 2022 CANDY WAVE (2022)
- Kyary Pamyu Pamyu World Tour 2023 -POPPP- (2023)

== Awards and nominations ==
Year	Association	Category	Nominated work	Result
2011	Best Styling Award 2011	Artist	Herself	Won
2011	Antville Music Video Awards	Most Fun	"Pon Pon Pon"	Nominated
2011	Antville Music Video Awards	Best Art Direction	"Pon Pon Pon"	Nominated
2012	Music Jacket Award	Grand Prix	Moshi Moshi Harajuku	Won
2012	Space Shower Music Video Awards	Special Award	Herself	Won
2012	Wired Japan Grand Prix	Special Award	Herself	Won
2012	Japan Record Awards	Special Award	Herself	Won
2012	Vogue Japan Women of the Year	Stylist	Herself	Won
2012	MTV Video Music Awards Japan	Best New Artist	Herself	Nominated
2012	Best Dressed Award	International	Herself	Won
2013	CD Shop Awards	The CD Shop Grand Prix	Pamyu Pamyu Revolution	2nd Place
2013	Space Shower Music Video Awards	Video of the Year	"Tsukematsukeru"	Won
2013	Rekochoku Best March Month Music Award	Download (Single)	"Ninjari Bang Bang"	Won
2013	Rekochoku Best March Month Music Award	Ring Song	"Ninjari Bang Bang"	Won
2013	MTV Video Music Awards Japan	Best Pop Video	"Fashion Monster"	Won
2013	MTV Video Music Awards Japan	Best Karaoke Song	"Fashion Monster"	Won
2013	Fuse TV	Best New International Pop Artist	Herself	Nominated
2013	2013 MTV Europe Music Awards	Best Japanese Act	Herself	Nominated
2013	Mnet Asian Music Awards	Asian Artist	Herself	Won
2013	Japan Record Awards	Excellent Work Award	"Ninja Re Bang Bang"	Won
2013	Japan Record Awards	Excellent Album	Nanda Collection	Won
2014	Barbie Award 2014	—N/a	Herself	Won
2014	MTV Europe Music Awards	Best Japanese Act	Herself	Pre-nominated
2014	World Music Awards	Worlds Best Female Artist	Herself	Nominated
2014	World Music Awards	Worlds Best Live Act	Herself	Nominated
2014	World Music Awards	Worlds Best Entertainer of the Year	Herself	Nominated
2014	World Music Awards	Worlds Best Album	Nanda Collection	Nominated
2014	MTV Video Music Awards Japan	Best Pop Video	"Mottai Night Land"	Nominated
2014	MTV Video Music Awards Japan	Best Karaoke Song	"Mottai Night Land"	Won
2014	MTV Video Music Awards Japan	Best Album of the Year	Nanda Collection	Won
2014	Japan Record Awards	Excellent Work Award	"Family Party"	Won
2014	Japan Record Awards	Grand Prix	"Family Party"	Nominated
2015	Antville Music Video Awards	Best Choreography	"Crazy Party Night (Pumpkin no Gyakushū)"	Nominated
2015	Antville Music Video Awards	Best Art Direction	"Crazy Party Night (Pumpkin no Gyakushū)"	Won
2015	World Music Awards	Worlds Best Female Artist	Herself	Nominated
2015	World Music Awards	World's Best Live Act	Herself	Nominated
2015	World Music Awards	World's Best Entertainer of the Year	Herself	Nominated
2015	SBS PopAsia Award	Best Solo Star	Herself	Nominated
2015	Japan Record Award	Excellent Work Award	"Mondai Girl"	Won
2016	Tokyo Music Odyssey 2016	Best Costume Artist	Herself	Won
2016	Space Shower Music Video Awards	Best Costume Artist	Herself	Won
2016	Space Shower Music Video Awards	Best Pop Artist	Herself	Nominated
2016	Japan Record Award	Excellent Work Award	"Sai & Co"	Won
2017	Space Shower Music Awards; Tokyo Music Odissey 2017	Best Art Direction	"Sai & Co"	Won
2017	Space Shower Music Awards; Tokyo Music Odissey 2017	Best Music Friends	Herself	Won
2017	2017 MTV Europe Music Awards	Best Japanese Act	Herself	Nominated
2018	Space Shower Music Video Awards	Best Female Artist	Herself	Nominated
2019	Space Shower Music Video Awards	Best Female Artist	Herself	Nominated
2019	Space Shower Music Video Awards	Best Art Direction Video	"Oto no Kuni"	Won

== Bibliography ==
- Caroline Charonplop Kyarypamyupamyu (August 18, 2011), Oh! My God!! Harajuku Girl (in Japanese) (Hardcover ed.), Tokyo: Poplar Publishing, ISBN 978-4-591-12542-7
- Kyary Pamyu Pamyu (June 21, 2012), Oh! My God!! Harajuku Girl, Poplar Bunko (in Japanese) (Paperback Bunko ed.), Tokyo: Poplar Publishing, ISBN 978-4-591-13045-2
- Caroline Charonplop Kyary Pamyu Pamyu (July 29, 2011), Harajuku Kawaii!!!! girls, Gain mook (in Japanese), Yasumasa Yonehara (Photographer), Nagoya, Japan: Gain, ISBN 978-4-901621-97-7
- Kyary Pamyu Pamyu (April 21, 2012), aoty Boooon (in Japanese), Tokyo: Syōdensha, ISBN 978-4-396-43051-1
- Caroline Charonplop Kyary Pamyu Pamyu (October 29, 2012), Kyarypamyupamyu's Moshi Moshi Tokyo Kawaii Guide Tour (in Japanese), Tokyo: Space Shower Network, ISBN 978-4-906700-55-4
- Caroline Charonplop Kyary Pamyu Pamyu (October 29, 2012), Hara-J Harajuku Joshi (Harajuku Girls), Kōbunsha Woman Books vol.141 (in Japanese), Tokyo: Kōbunsha, ISBN 978-4-334-84244-4
- Kyary Pamyu Pamyu (August 8, 2013), Official Documentary Photo Book -100%KPP World Tour 2013, Tokyo: AsobiSystem
- Kyary Pamyu Pamyu (November 12, 2013), Hara-J Harajuku Joshi (Harajuku Girls), Jyosei Jishin Zōkan (in Japanese), vol. 2, Tokyo: Kōbunsha
- Nakamura, Steve (December 2016), Kyary Pamyu Pamyu Art Works 2011–2016 (in Japanese), Tokyo: Seibundo Shinkosha Publishing Co., Ltd., ISBN 9784416716724
- Kyary Pamyu Pamyu (January 21, 2017), Kyary Pamyu Pamyu Atashi Idol Ja Shi!!! (TOKYO NEWS MOOK) (in Japanese), Tokyo: Tokyo News Service Co., Ltd., ISBN 9784863366176
