= Tsukematsukeru =

- Regular Edition cover

Single by Kyary Pamyu Pamyu

from the album Pamyu Pamyu Revolution
- B-side: "Kyary ANAN"
- Released: December 7, 2011 (Download); January 11, 2012 (CD)
- Recorded: 2011
- Genre: J-pop
- Length: 4:37
- Label: Unborde
- Songwriter: Yasutaka Nakata
- Producer: Yasutaka Nakata

Kyary Pamyu Pamyu singles chronology
"Jelly" (2011)	"Tsukematsukeru" (2011)	"Candy Candy" (2012)

"Tsukematsukeru" (つけまつける; "False Eyelashes") is a song by Japanese recording artist Kyary Pamyu Pamyu, from her debut studio album Pamyu Pamyu Revolution. The lyrics are about a girl putting on her false eyelashes. The song is described as "an ambitious track" that is "bursting with Kyary's individuality". The single was digitally released on December 7, 2011, and then physically on January 11, 2012. The physical single was released in two editions: a limited edition containing a photobook and a CD-only regular edition. A limited edition 7" single was released exclusively to DJs on 17 July 2013 with the extended mix of "Tsukematsukeru" as the A-side and the extended mix of "Mina No Uta" as the B-side.

== Background and chart performance ==
In an interview with the press, Kyary Pamyu Pamyu stated that the song was created after texting her producer, Nakata Yasutaka. Kyary said that she became addicted to putting on false eyelashes, and Nakata texted back saying that "Tsukematsukeru has a great ring to it". The song was written and recorded the next day. "Tsukematsukeru" was featured in a commercial for the Mameshiba characters, while the B-side "Kyary ANAN" (きゃりーANAN) was used in a commercial for the An part-time job magazine.

Upon the song's digital release, "Tsukematsukeru" charted at No. 93 on the Billboard Japan Hot 100, and later peaked at No. 3 on the issue dated January 23, 2012. The single's physical release debuted on the Oricon weekly singles chart at No. 7, selling 13,100 copies. It charted for 17 weeks, selling a total of 34,079 copies. In February 2013, "Tsukematsukeru" was certified Gold for 100,000 legal chaku-uta full downloads, and 100,000 legal PC downloads.

== Track listing ==
All tracks are written by Yasutaka Nakata.

Physical single
No.	Title	Length
1.	"Tsukematsukeru" (つけまつける; False Eyelashes)	4:19
2.	"Kyary ANAN" (きゃりーANAN)	3:18
3.	"Cherry Bonbon" (extended version; チェリーボンボン)	5:00
Total length:		12:37

Digital download
No.	Title	Length
1.	"Tsukematsukeru" (つけまつける; False Eyelashes)	4:19
Total length:		4:19

== Charts ==
Chart (2011–2012)	Peak position
Japan Billboard Top Airplay	1
Japan Billboard Hot 100	3
Japan Billboard Adult Contemporary Airplay	2
Japan Oricon Daily	5
Japan Oricon Weekly	7
U.S. Billboard Top World Albums	8

== Personnel ==
Credits adapted from liner notes.

- Yasutaka Nakata – written, arranged, produced, recorded, mixed, mastered
- Steve Nakamura – art director
- Shinji Konishi – hair, make-up
- Takeshi Hanzawa – photographer
- Kumiko Iijima – stylist
