= Fashion Monster =

- Regular Edition cover

Single by Kyary Pamyu Pamyu

from the album Nanda Collection
- B-side: "100% no Jibun ni"
- Released: October 17, 2012 (CD)
- Recorded: 2012
- Genre: J-pop • Halloween music • Drum n Bass
- Length: 4:37
- Label: Unborde; Sire (US)
- Songwriter: Yasutaka Nakata
- Producer: Yasutaka Nakata

Kyary Pamyu Pamyu singles chronology
| "Candy Candy" (2012) | "Fashion Monster" (2012) | "Kimi ni 100 Percent" (2013) |

Professional ratings
Review scores
| Source | Rating |
|---|---|
| Rolling Stone Japan | 3.5/5 stars |

"Fashion Monster" (ファッションモンスター, Fasshon Monsutā) is the third physical single by Japanese pop singer Kyary Pamyu Pamyu. The single is Halloween themed, and was released October 17, 2012. The song was used in commercials for G.u. Kyary re-released the single through Sire Records in the United States on April 30, 2013.

== Music Video ==
The video for Fashion Monster is directed by Yasutaka Nakata. The video’s elements are taken from the Tim Burton movie Beetlejuice. In it, Kyary Pamyu Pamyu is shown in a haunted house at night accompanied by a moon with sharp teeth. She is performing in a band of monsters and dancing with them, playing weird looking instruments, including her holding a gold mechanical looking heart-shaped guitar with a telephone that she picks up on it. At one point she flips off the camera followed by another scene showing Kyary hypnotizing a wise old sensei (whom is later shown in the house) to slice poles with a katana with the last one’s label being pixelated. The moon turns into a ghost halfway through the video. The moon starts to vomit pink liquid on Kyary in slow motion as the video come to a close.

== Track listing ==
All tracks are written by Yasutaka Nakata.

Physical single
| No. | Title | Length |
|---|---|---|
| 1. | "Fashion Monster" (ファッションモンスター) | 4:37 |
| 2. | "100% no Jibun ni" (100%のじぶんに Hyaku Pāsento no Jibun ni) | 3:28 |
| 3. | "Tsukematsukeru (extended version)" (つけまつける-extended mix-) | 4:56 |
| 4. | "Pamyu Revo-Medley" ((ぱみゅレボメドレー Pamyu Rebo-medorē) (Pamyu Pamyu Revolution 45" radio spot)) | 0:45 |

== Charts ==
| Chart (2012) | Peak position |
|---|---|
| Japan Oricon Daily | 3 |
| Japan Oricon Weekly | 5 |
| Japan Billboard Hot 100 | 2 |
| Japan Billboard Hot Singles Sales | 5 |
| Japan Billboard Hot Top Airplay | 1 |
| Japan Billboard Adult Contemporary Airplay | 1 |
| U.S. Billboard Top World Albums | 8 |

== Personnel ==
Credits adapted from liner notes.

- Yasutaka Nakata – written, arranged, produced, recorded, mixed, mastered
- Steve Nakamura – art director, designer
- Shinji Konishi – hair, make-up
- Takeshi Hanzawa – photographer
- Kumiko Iijima – stylist
- Chihiko Kameyama – prop decorator
