= Mameshiba (franchise) =

Japanese merchandise franchise

Mameshiba (豆しば) is a Japanese merchandise franchise created by copywriter and Korean Japanese national Kim Sukwon. The Mameshiba are different varieties of beans (and other legumes and nuts) that have dog-like faces and answer a trivia question. The name is a pun based on the Japanese word for "bean", mame (豆); the toy version of the Shiba Inu, called mameshiba (豆柴); and the Japanese word for "trivia", mamechishiki (豆知識, literally "beans of knowledge").

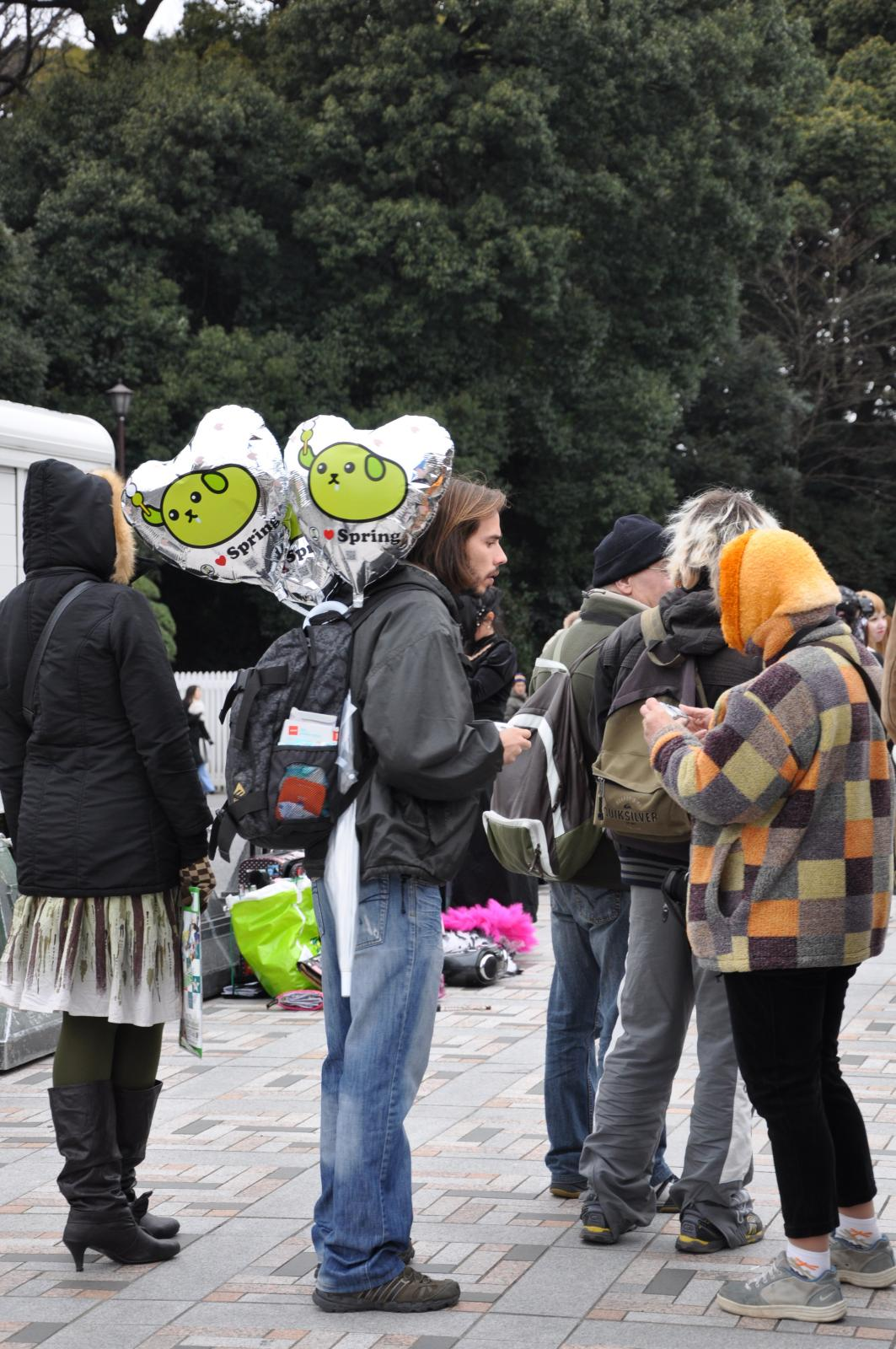
A person with Mameshiba balloons attached to their backpack.

Mameshiba became popular in 2008 through a series of animated interstitials produced by Dentsu that were sold to Japanese television networks to air instead of commercials. Their popularity in Japan and Asia eventually led to their release in the United States via Viz Media, Hot Topic, and some Mameshiba are sold at FYE. They were famous in France thanks to the now-defunct television network Nolife.

== Characters ==
- Green Pea (グリーンピーしば, Gurīn Pī Shiba)
- Black Bean (黒豆しば, Kuromame Shiba)
- Peanut (ピーナッしば, Pīnasshiba)
- Natto (納豆しば, Nattō Shiba)
- Edamame (枝豆しば, Edamame Shiba)
- Red Bean (小豆しば, Azuki Shiba)
- Sweet Bean (甘納豆しば, Amanattō Shiba)
- Coffee Bean (コーヒー豆しば, Kōhīmame Shiba)
  - Mocha (モカ, Moka), Colombia (コロンビア, Koronbia), Brazil (ブラジル, Burajiru), Kilimanjaro (キリマンジャロ, Kirimanjaro), Blue Mountain (ブルーマウンテン, Burū Maunten)
- Cashew Nut (カシューナッしば, Kashūnasshiba)
- Jelly Bean (ジェリービーンしば, Jerībīn Shiba)
  - Melon (メロン, Meron), Peach (ピーチ, Pīchi), Strawberry (ストロベリー, Sutoroberī), Soda (ソーダ, Sōda), Orange (オレンジ, Orenji), Pineapple (パイナップル, Painappuru), Grape (グレープ, Gurēpu)
- Chickpea (ひよこ豆しば, Hiyokomame Shiba)
- Sword Bean (刀豆しば, Natamame Shiba)
- Boiled Bean (煮豆しば, Nimame Shiba)
- Chili Bean (チリビーンしば, Chiribīn Shiba)
- Tiger Bean (虎豆しば, Toramame Shiba)
- Soybean (大豆しば, Daizu Shiba)
- Pistachio (ピスタチオしば, Pisutachio Shiba)
- Lentil (レンズ豆しば, Renzumame Shiba)
- Fava Bean (そら豆しば, Soramame Shiba)
- Cocoa Bean (カカオ豆しば, Kakaomame Shiba)
- Black Soybean (黒大豆しば, Kurodaizu Shiba)
- White Soybean (白大豆しば, Shirodaizu Shiba)
- Almond (アーモンドしば, Āmondo Shiba)
- Mung Bean (ムング豆しば, Mungumame Shiba), referred to as "The Scream" in English after the painting to which its face refers.
- Black-eyed Pea (ブラックアイドピーしば, Burakkuaidō Pī Shiba)
- Cranberry Bean (クランベリーしば, Kuranberī Shiba)
- Lima Bean (リマしば, Rima Shiba)
