= Invader Invader =

- Regular Edition cover

Single by Kyary Pamyu Pamyu

from the album Nanda Collection
- B-side: "Point of View"
- Released: May 15, 2013
- Recorded: 2013
- Genre: Electropop; J-Pop; dubstep
- Length: 4:12
- Label: Unborde
- Songwriter: Yasutaka Nakata
- Producer: Yasutaka Nakata

Kyary Pamyu Pamyu singles chronology
| "Ninja Re Bang Bang" (2013) | "Invader Invader" (2013) | "Mottai Night Land" (2013) |

Music video
- "Invader Invader" on YouTube

"Invader Invader" (インベーダーインベーダー, Inbēdā inbēdā) is the sixth physical single by Japanese singer Kyary Pamyu Pamyu. It was released on May 15, 2013, in both regular and limited editions. The song "Invader Invader" is used for the G.u. clothing retailer commercials in Japan while the second track, "Point of View", was used for Fuji TV's 2013 afternoon news program "Ageru TV".

== Background and composition ==
"Invader Invader" was first announced on March 31, 2013, as Kyary's 6th physical single. The song is a 1980s-tinged electropop chiptune track written specifically for the commercial by Yasutaka Nakata. The artwork in the single is themed with "otherworldly creatures", with costumes designed by Kumiko Iijima. The limited edition jacket cover features a proud Kyary showing off the "fairy Kyary" on her index finger, while the regular edition jacket cover shows strange creatures with watermelon-patterned hair.

The dancing in the music video and the four note 'da da da da' are reminiscent of Japanese video game Space Invaders also from the 80's. The syllable 'da' is also on the mask of the four dancers.

== Charts and certifications ==
Chart Positions

| Chart | Position |
|---|---|
| Japan [Top Weekly] (Oricon) | # 6 |

Certifications

- Gold ( Recording Industry Association of Japan, PC delivery)

== Music video ==
The music video for Invader Invader was released on YouTube on May 6, 2013, and coincided with YouTube Music Week. In this music video, Kyary is the leader of a secret society that makes alien contact through a strange dancing ritual. Elements of the summoning are placed on a board, the dancers take a deep bow to the world, but the last missing piece for gaining the alien's love is a piece of shrimp sushi. Convinced, the alien DJ is beamed down from his spacecraft and joins the ritual/party.

The shooting for the music video took place at the end of April in Kawasaki, and reunites Kyary with the director for the music video for Ninja Re Bang Bang, Jun Tamukai, as well as stylist Kumiko Iijima who has been working with her since her debut, paying special attention to every detail.

The dresses were, as is typical of Kyary, tailor-made for the shooting. The patchwork dresses were assembled from vintage clothing and the clothes from 'Spank' in Koenji by Kumiko Iijima, who worked through the shooting, bringing her own sewing machine to polish details on the set. Each of the dancers' dress is different, to show originality.

== Track listing ==
All tracks are written by Yasutaka Nakata.

Physical single
| No. | Title | Length |
|---|---|---|
| 1. | "Invader Invader" (インベーダーインベーダー) | 4:12 |
| 2. | "Point of View" | 3:35 |
| 3. | "Fashion Monster (extended mix)" (ファッションモンスター-extended mix-) | 4:55 |

== Personnel ==
Credits adapted from liner notes.

- Yasutaka Nakata – written, arranged, produced, recorded, mixed, mastered
- Steve Nakamura – art director, designer
- Shinji Konishi – hair, make-up
- Takeshi Hanzawa – photographer
- Kumiko Iijima – stylist

Credits for the music video

- Jun Tamukai - director
- Kumiko Iijima – stylist
- Asami Nemoto – hair, make-up
- Maiko – choreography
