= Ninja Re Bang Bang =

- Regular Edition cover

Single by Kyary Pamyu Pamyu

from the album Nanda Collection
- B-side: "Unite Unite"
- Released: March 20, 2013
- Recorded: 2013
- Genre: J-pop; electropop; dance-pop
- Length: 4:26
- Label: Unborde
- Songwriter: Yasutaka Nakata
- Producer: Yasutaka Nakata

Kyary Pamyu Pamyu singles chronology
| "Furisodation" (2013) | "Ninja Re Bang Bang" (2013) | "Invader Invader" (2013) |

"Ninja Re Bang Bang" (にんじゃりばんばん, -Ninjaribanban) is the fifth single by Japanese singer Kyary Pamyu Pamyu. It was released on March 20, 2013. The song is used as the theme song for the au "Full Control Tokyo" event commercials. The single was certified platinum by the RIAJ for PC downloads in April 2013. The song peaked at number one on Japan Hot 100, and became her first number one there. On April 19, 2014, limited editions of a 7' LP were released with A side: Ninja Re Bang Bang-extended mix-, exclusive for DJs.

== Track listing ==
All tracks are written by Yasutaka Nakata.

Physical single
| No. | Title | Length |
|---|---|---|
| 1. | "Ninja Re Bang Bang" (にんじゃりばんばん) | 4:26 |
| 2. | "Unite Unite" | 3:13 |
| 3. | "Minna no Uta -extended mix-" (みんなのうた-extended mix-) | 5:47 |
| Total length: | | 13:26 |

EP exclusive bonus tracks
| No. | Title | Length |
|---|---|---|
| 12. | "pamyurevomedley" (ぱみゅレボメドレー) | 0:45 |

== Music video ==
Most references are taken from Natari.jp, which also shows pictures of the filming.

The music video was shot at the end of February in a studio in the Kanagawa prefecture. The filming was done completely in greenscreen, with 3D rendered computer graphics later added. Although the filming was mostly virtual, filming involved physical effects, such a trampoline for jumping scenes, a giant fan to simulate wind.

In the music video, Kyary alternates between two characters, a ninja and a princess. Choreographer Maiko described the dancing as 'completely ninja', with shuriken throwing motion, high jumps, while still keeping a feminine side while singing 'blooming petals are dancing'. The clothes styles for the ninja are 'black clothes' and 'women's trousers', with a katana and head band chosen by Kyary. Kyary additionally commented that the outfit was 'really cool, they should sell it in Harajuku'. The other character is the 'badly behaved princess', with an antique kimono in 'shocking pink' color and an ornate hairpin (kanzashi) made specially to Kyary's taste.

The opening scene shows Kyary riding on a Japanese koi fish with loving eyes, a pun on 'koi' which means love in the lyrics.

Kyary already referenced The Drifters' Hige dance in her music video for Pon Pon Pon. Ken Shimura from The Drifters and Yuuka have a similar character to the badly behaved princess, stupid princess Yuuka. In the episode of Ken Shimura's Stupid Lord (志村けんのバカ殿様) that aired on 20 February 2015, the Stupid Lord and Princess Yuuka had a skit where Princess Yuuka is dressed in shocking pink and plays Mottai Night Land on her CD player.

== Personnel ==
Credits adapted from liner notes.

- Yasutaka Nakata – written, arranged, produced, recorded, mixed, mastered
- Steve Nakamura – art director, designer
- Shinji Konishi – hair, make-up
- Takeshi Hanzawa – photographer
- Kumiko Iijima – stylist

Credits for the music video:

- Jun Tamukai - director
- Kumiko Iijima - stylist
- Choreography and motion captured dancing for the Fūjin, Raijin and robots - Maiko

== In popular culture ==
- "Ninja Re Bang Bang" is briefly heard in the 2016 American animated film, Sing, during which five red panda girls practice for their audition.
- "Ninja Re Bang Bang" is on the tracklist for Just Dance Wii U.
- "Ninja Re Bang Bang" is also featured in 2019 film, John Wick: Chapter 3 – Parabellum
- A remix of this song by Steve Aoki titled "Ninja Re Bang Bang Steve Aoki Remix" is used as a theme song for the free-to-play video game Ninjala.
