= Pamyu Pamyu Revolution =

- Regular Edition cover

Studio album by Kyary Pamyu Pamyu
- Released: May 23, 2012
- Recorded: 2011–12
- Genre: J-pop; electropop; bubblegum pop
- Length: 47:32
- Label: Unborde (Warner Music Japan)
- Producer: Yasutaka Nakata; Keiichi Ishizaka; (executive producer); Yusuke Nakagawa (executive producer)

Kyary Pamyu Pamyu chronology
Moshi Moshi Harajuku (2011)	Pamyu Pamyu Revolution (2012)	Dokidoki Wakuwaku Pamyu Pamyu Revolution Land (2013)

Kyary Pamyu Pamyu studio album chronology
Pamyu Pamyu Revolution (2012)	Nanda Collection (2013)

Singles from Pamyu Pamyu Revolution
- 1. "PonPonPon" Released: July 20, 2011; 2. "Tsukematsukeru" Released: December 7, 2011; 3. "Candy Candy" Released: March 13, 2012

Professional ratings
Review scores
Source	Rating
Rolling Stone Japan	3/5 stars
The Japan Times	Highly Favorable

Pamyu Pamyu Revolution (ぱみゅぱみゅレボリューション, Pamyu Pamyu Reboryūshon) is the debut studio album by Japanese singer Kyary Pamyu Pamyu, released on May 23, 2012.

The album includes the first two physical singles released by Kyary, "Tsukematsukeru" and "Candy Candy", as well as "PonPonPon", which was also included on her debut EP Moshi Moshi Harajuku. The limited edition of the album comes with a 64-page photobook with pages 41–61 taken in Los Angeles, and a bonus DVD with music videos and two live versions taken from Kyary's Moshi Moshi Quattro Live, held on February 25, 2012, at Shibuya's Club Quattro.

The album debuted at number one on the Oricon daily chart, and was certified Gold by the RIAJ. Though Kyary Pamyu Pamyu only promoted Pamyu Pamyu Revolution in Japan, the album and its singles saw success internationally. "PonPonPon" topped the iTunes Electronic Songs charts in Belgium and Finland. The "Tsukematsukeru" EP peaked at number eight on the U.S. Billboard Top World Albums chart. The album topped the iTunes Electronic Albums charts in the United States, France, and Belgium.

The album was also released in Taiwan on March 15, 2013 and debuted at number three of G-Music's J-pop Albums Chart and number nineteen of the G-Music's Combo Albums Chart.

== Track listing ==
All tracks are written by Yasutaka Nakata.

No.	Title	Length
1.	"Pamyu Pamyu Revolution" (ぱみゅぱみゅレボリューション Pamyu Pamyu Reboryūshon)	1:00
2.	"Tsukematsukeru" (つけまつける)	4:18
3.	"Pon Pon Pon"	4:02
4.	"Minna no Uta" (みんなのうた)	5:03
5.	"Kyary ANAN" (きゃりーANAN)	3:15
6.	"Candy Candy"	3:50
7.	"Drinker"	4:17
8.	"Onedari 44°C" (おねだり44°C Onedari Yonjuuyon do)	3:39
9.	"Suki Sugite Kiresō" (スキすぎてキレそう)	5:19
10.	"Giri Giri Safe" (ぎりぎりセーフ Giri Giri Sēfu)	3:13
11.	"Oyasumi" (おやすみ)	4:42
12.	"Chan Chaka Chan Chan" (ちゃんちゃかちゃんちゃん)	4:46
Total length:		47:32

Limited edition bonus DVD
No.	Title	Length
1.	"PonPonPon" (Music Video)
2.	"Tsukematsukeru" (Music Video)
3.	"Candy Candy" (Music Video)
4.	"PonPonPon" (Moshi Moshi Quattro Live - 2012.2.25 @ Shibuya Club Quattro)
5.	"Kyary An-An" (Moshi Moshi Quattro Live - 2012.2.25 @ Shibuya Club Quattro)

== Personnel ==
Credits adapted from liner notes.

- Yasutaka Nakata – written, played, arranged, produced, recorded, mixed, mastered
- Steve Nakamura – art director, designer
- Takeshi Hanzawa – photographer
- Shinji Konishi – hair, make-up
- Kumiko Iijima – stylist
- Yusuke Nakagawa – executive producer
- Kei Ishizaka – executive producer
- Ryoma Suzuki – label head
- Tsuyoshi Ishii – general producer
- Satoru Yamazaki – artist management
- Harumi Ito – A&R
- Satoshi Kido – sales promotion
- Noriko Ohara – digital planning

== Charts ==
Chart (2012)	Peak position
Japan Oricon Daily Albums	1
Japan Oricon Weekly Albums	2
Japan Oricon Monthly Albums	4
Japan Billboard Top Albums	3
Japan Sound Scan Albums Ranking TOP20	1
Belgium Ultratop Albums Chart (Wallonia)	176
Taiwan G-Music Combo Albums Chart	19
Taiwan G-Music J-pop Albums Chart	3

== Sales and certifications ==
Chart	Amount
Oricon physical sales	163,000
RIAJ physical shipping certification	Gold (+100,000)
