= Candy Candy (song) =

- Regular Edition cover

Single by Kyary Pamyu Pamyu

from the album Pamyu Pamyu Revolution
- B-side: "Demo Demo Mada Mada"
- Released: March 13, 2012 (download); April 4, 2012 (CD)
- Recorded: 2012
- Genre: Electronica, J-pop
- Length: 3:50
- Label: UnBorde
- Songwriter(s): Yasutaka Nakata
- Producer(s): Yasutaka Nakata

Kyary Pamyu Pamyu singles chronology
"Tsukematsukeru" (2011)	"Candy Candy" (2012)	"Fashion Monster" (2012)

"Candy Candy" is the second single by Japanese pop singer Kyary Pamyu Pamyu from her debut studio album Pamyu Pamyu Revolution. It was released in 2012 as a digital download on March 13, and as a physical single on April 4.

== Music video ==
Kyary states that the theme of the video is "80s idol singer" and that in the music video she wears a costume like "80's magical girl anime", like Magical Princess Minky Momo and Creamy Mami, the Magic Angel. In the beginning, she runs in a hurry, being late for her appearance on a musical program. Running in a hurry with a slice of toast in the mouth is a stereotype from '80−'90s anime and manga, especially those for girls. When Kyary arrives at the stage, the program is already on air, and she immediately starts to sing and dance. She then takes a rest in her dressing room. Later on, a cosplay double of her with the same outfit, but with an anime mask, begins to dance in her place. Halfway through the second chorus, she then dropkicks it and continues the rest of the routine. In the end, she dances with her backup dancers as the double is still there dancing with them.

The ranking table which rolls to show the names of songs is similar to one in a famous Japanese live musical program in the '80s, "The Best Ten".

== Track listing ==
All tracks are written by Yasutaka Nakata.

Physical single
No.	Title	Length
1.	"Candy Candy"	3:51
2.	"Demo Demo Mada Mada" (でもでもまだまだ)	4:13
3.	"Chōdo Ii no (extended version)" (ちょうどいいの)	4:25

Digital download
No.	Title	Length
1.	"Candy Candy"	3:51
Total length:		3:51

== Charts ==
Chart (2012)	Peak position
Japan Billboard Top Airplay	1
Japan Billboard Hot 100	2
Japan Billboard Adult Contemporary Airplay	5
Japan Billboard Hot Singles Sales	7
Japan Oricon Daily	6
Japan Oricon Weekly	8
Japan RIAJ Digital Track Chart	8
Panda! Go, Panda! Top Hits!	10
