= KPP Best =

Compilation album by Kyary Pamyu Pamyu
- Released: May 25, 2016
- Recorded: 2011–2015
- Genre: J-pop
- Length: 1:34:14
- Language: Japanese; English
- Label: Unborde (Warner Music Japan)
- Producer: Yasutaka Nakata

Kyary Pamyu Pamyu chronology
Pika Pika Fantajin (2014)	KPP Best (2016)	Japamyu (2018)

KPP Best is a compilation album by Japanese singer Kyary Pamyu Pamyu, officially released on May 25, 2016. The album was released to celebrate the fifth anniversary of her debut and coincided with the "Five Years Monster World Tour".

A special edition version (limited to 55,555 copies) comes with a third disc of remixes by producer Yasutaka Nakata. A second limited edition (5,555 copies) was released on 1 October 2016, featuring a Hallowe'en-themed cover.

== Track listing ==
All tracks are written by Yasutaka Nakata

Disc one
No.	Title	Original album	Length
1.	"KPP ON STAGE"		0:55
2.	"Pon Pon Pon"	Moshi Moshi Harajuku EP	4:02
3.	"Cherry Bonbon" (チェリーボンボン)	Moshi Moshi Harajuku EP	3:38
4.	"Tsukematsukeru" (つけまつける)	Pamyu Pamyu Revolution	4:21
5.	"Kyary ANAN" (きゃりーANAN)	Pamyu Pamyu Revolution	3:18
6.	"Candy Candy"	Pamyu Pamyu Revolution	3:51
7.	"Fashion Monster" (ファッションモンスター)	Nanda Collection	4:37
8.	"Kimi ni 100 Percent" (キミに100パーセント)	Nanda Collection	3:20
9.	"Furisodation" (ふりそでーしょん)	Nanda Collection	4:05
10.	"Family Party (album mix)" (ファミリーパーティー-album mix-)	Pika Pika Fantajin	3:39
11.	"Super Scooter Happy (Capsule cover)"	Nanda Collection	5:54
12.	"Yume no Hajima Ring Ring (album mix)" (ゆめのはじまりんりん-album mix-)	Pika Pika Fantajin	4:04

Disc two
No.	Title	Original album	Length
1.	"Ninja Re Bang Bang" (にんじゃりばんばん)	Nanda Collection	4:26
2.	"Mottai Night Land" (もったいないとらんど)	Pika Pika Fantajin	4:01
3.	"5iVE YEARS MONSTER"		2:53
4.	"Kira Kira Killer" (きらきらキラー)	Pika Pika Fantajin	4:16
5.	"Invader Invader" (インベーダーインベーダー)	Nanda Collection	4:11
6.	"Kanzen Keitai" (完全形態)		3:39
7.	"Tokyo Highway" (トーキョーハイウェイ)	Pika Pika Fantajin	5:09
8.	"Crazy Party Night (Pumpkin no Gyakushū)" (Crazy Party Night ～ぱんぷきんの逆襲～)	A-side of "Crazy Party Night"	4:14
9.	"No No No"	B-side of "Crazy Party Night"	4:08
10.	"Mondai Girl" (もんだいガール)	A-side of "Mondai Girl"	4:36
11.	"Cosmetic Coaster" (コスメティックコースター)	B-side of "Sai & Co"	3:25
12.	"Sai & Co" (最&高)	A-side of "Sai & Co"	3:32

Disc three (Limited editions only)
No.	Title	Length
1.	"Cherry Bonbon (Extended mix)" (チェリーボンボン-extended mix-)	5:00
2.	"Choudo ii No (Extended mix)" (ちょうどいいの -extended mix-)	4:25
3.	"Tsukematsukeru (Extended mix)" (つけまつける -extended mix-)	4:56
4.	"CANDY CANDY -remix-"	4:32
5.	"Minna no Uta (Extended mix)" (みんなのうた -extended mix-)	5:47
6.	"Fashion Monster (Extended Mix)" (ファッションモンスター -extended mix-)	4:55
7.	"Ninja Re Bang Bang (Extended Mix)" (にんじゃりばんばん -extended mix-)	5:43
8.	"Invader Invader (Extended Mix)" (インベーダーインベーダー -extended mix-)	5:28
9.	"Mottai Night Land (Extended Mix)" (もったいないとらんど -extended mix-)	4:51
10.	"Kira Kira Killer (Extended Mix)" (きらきらキラー -extended mix-)	5:11

== Sales ==
KPP Best was certified Gold by the Recording Industry Association of Japan in November 2016.
