= 2014 MTV Video Music Awards Japan =

Annual Japanese music awards ceremony

- 2014 MTV VMAJ logo
- Date: June 14, 2014
- Venue: Maihama Amphitheater (Chiba)
- Country: Japan
- Hosted by: Sayumi Michishige; T.M.Revolution; W-inds
- Most awards: Kyary Pamyu Pamyu (2)
- Most nominations: Beyoncé, Kyary Pamyu Pamyu (3 each)

Television/radio coverage
- Network: MTV Japan; MTV Asia; J-One

The 2014 MTV Video Music Awards Japan was held on June 14, 2014, at the Maihama Amphitheater in Chiba. Hosted by Sayumi Michishige, T.M.Revolution, and W-inds, the ceremony honored the best Japanese and Western music and music videos released in Japan between March 1, 2013, and February 28, 2014. Beyoncé and Kyary Pamyu Pamyu were the most-nominated artists, with three nominations apiece. Kyary Pamyu Pamyu won two awards, for Album of the Year and Best Karaokee! Song respectively, and was the most-awarded artist of the night.

== Broadcast ==
The show was broadcast live domestically on MTV Japan at 18:00JST; on MTV Asia in Singapore, Malaysia, Indonesia, Korea, China, Taiwan, Vietnam, Philippines, Thailand; and on J-One in France. The main part of the ceremony was streamed online via the official VMAJ website by digital partner GyaO! to domestic and international viewers. MTV Japan aired the television replay the following day at 15:00JST.

Viewership of the live broadcast on MTV Japan reached 20 million households.

== Performances ==
Glay and Hatsune Miku were the second acts to be announced as performers, on April 21. This was the first time either act would be performing on the VMAJ stage. Kaela Kimura was announced next, on May 13—the appearance marked her first live performance in over a year since March 2013. Coldplay was added to the lineup on May 19, with the news that they would be performing a new song.

List of musical performances
Artist(s)	Song(s)
Hatsune Miku	
E-Girls	"E.G. Anthem – We Are Venus"
Coldplay	"Magic" "A Sky Full of Stars"
Berryz Kobo and Sayumi Michishige	"Cha Cha Sing" "Love Is Always Inside You"
Glay	"Yuwaku" "Bleeze"
Kaela Kimura	"Real Life, Real Heart" "Ole! Oh!" "Magic Music"
Kyary Pamyu Pamyu	"Sungoi Aura" "Kira Kira Killer"
Daichi Miura	"I’m On Fire"
T.M. Revolution	"Phantom Pain"

== Presenters ==
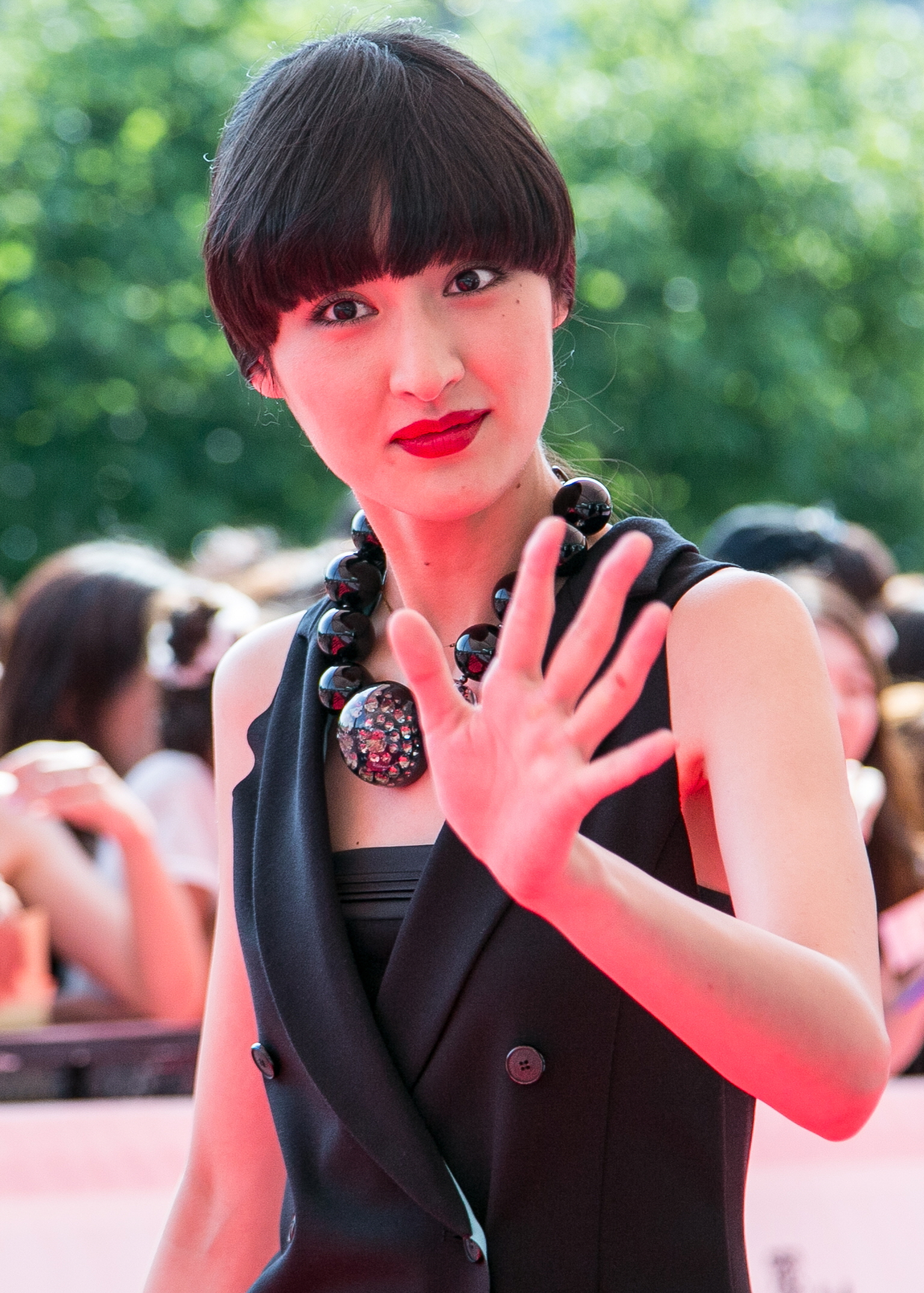
Kavka Shishido at the 2014 MTV Video Music Awards Japan

- Chiaki Horan
- Funassyi
- Hyadain
- Rev. from DVL
- Ryu-boshiryo
- Kavka Shishido
- Takeshi Takei

== Winners and nominees ==
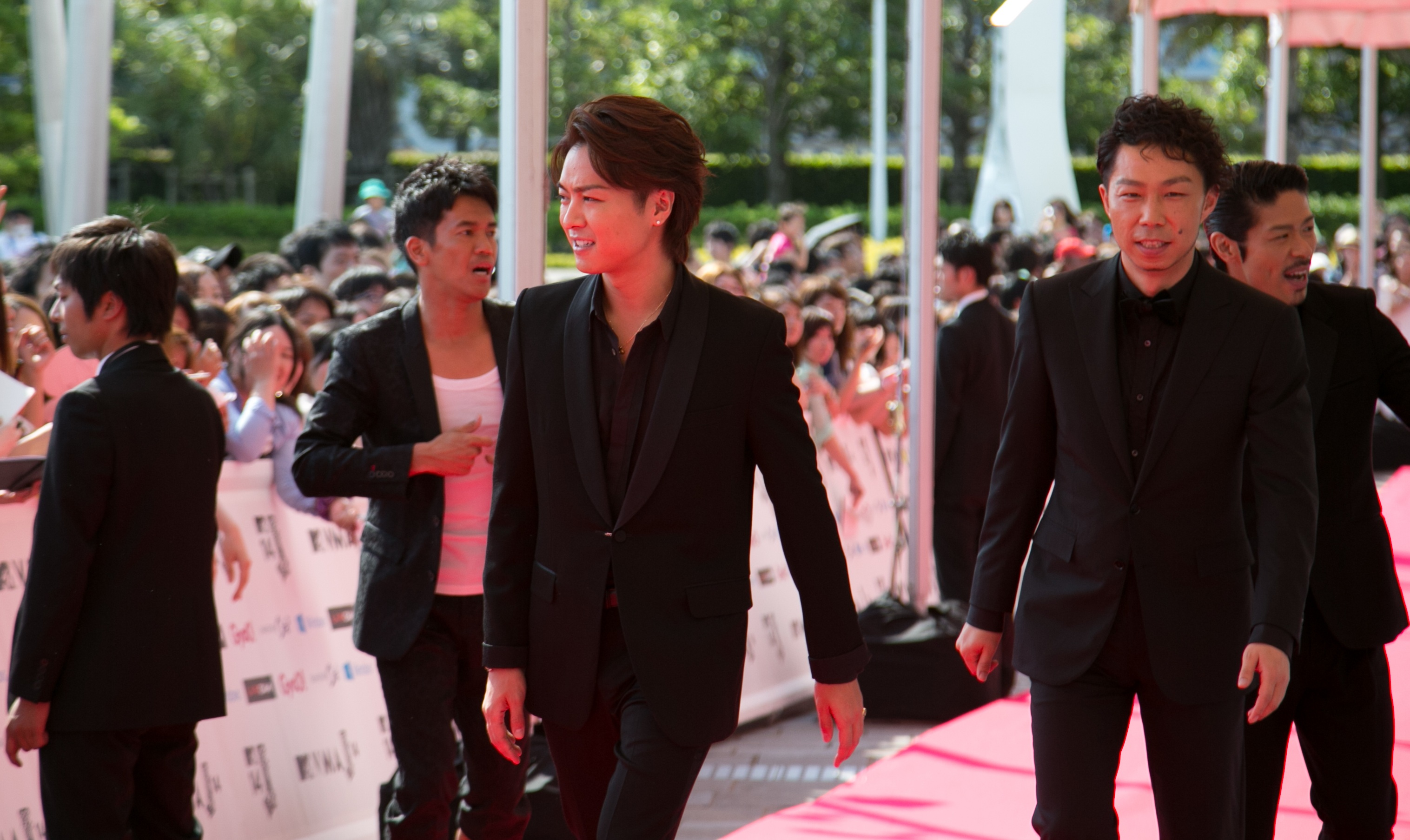
Members of Exile at the 2014 MTV VMAJ

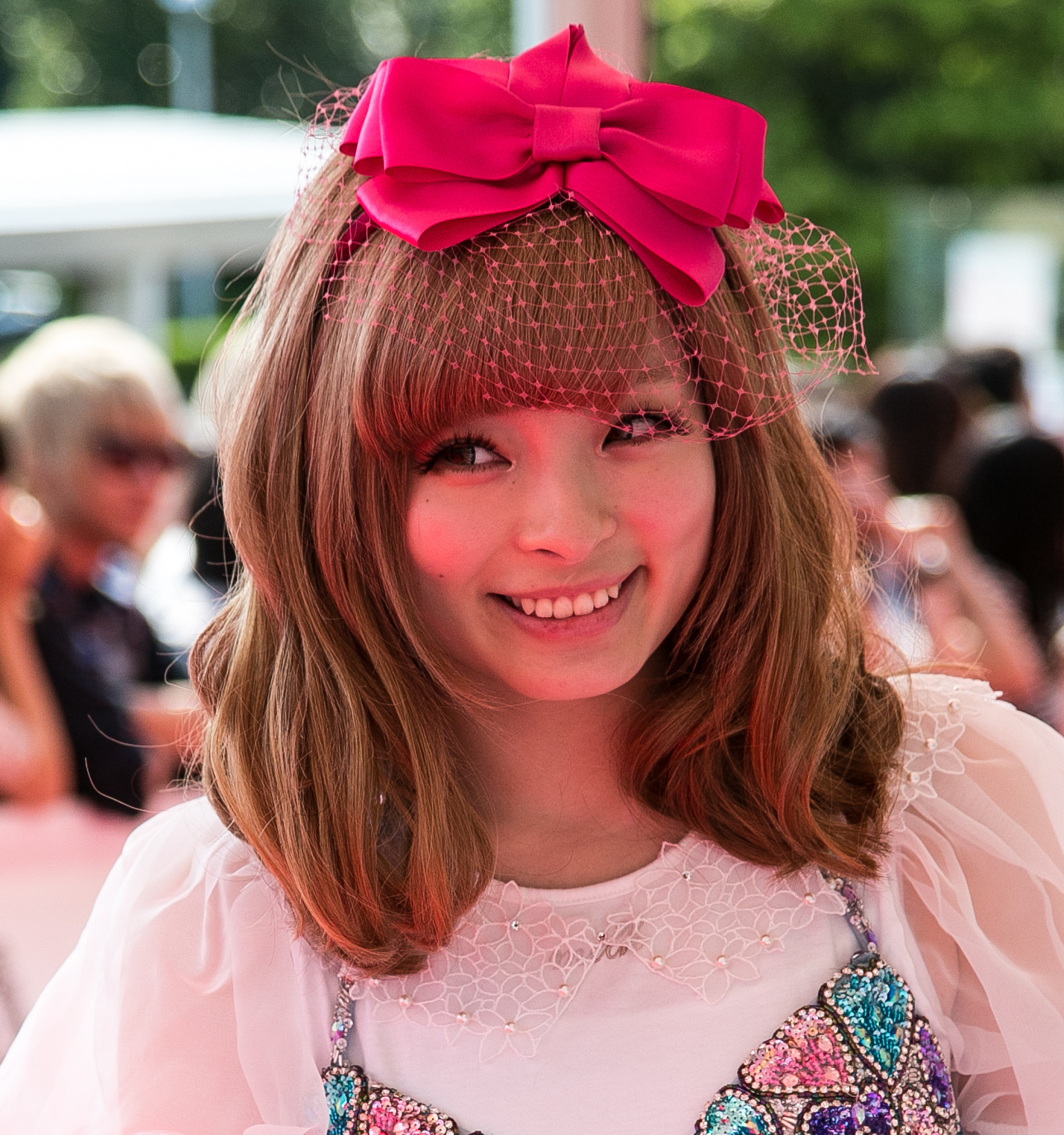
Kyary Pamyu Pamyu at the 2014 MTV VMAJ

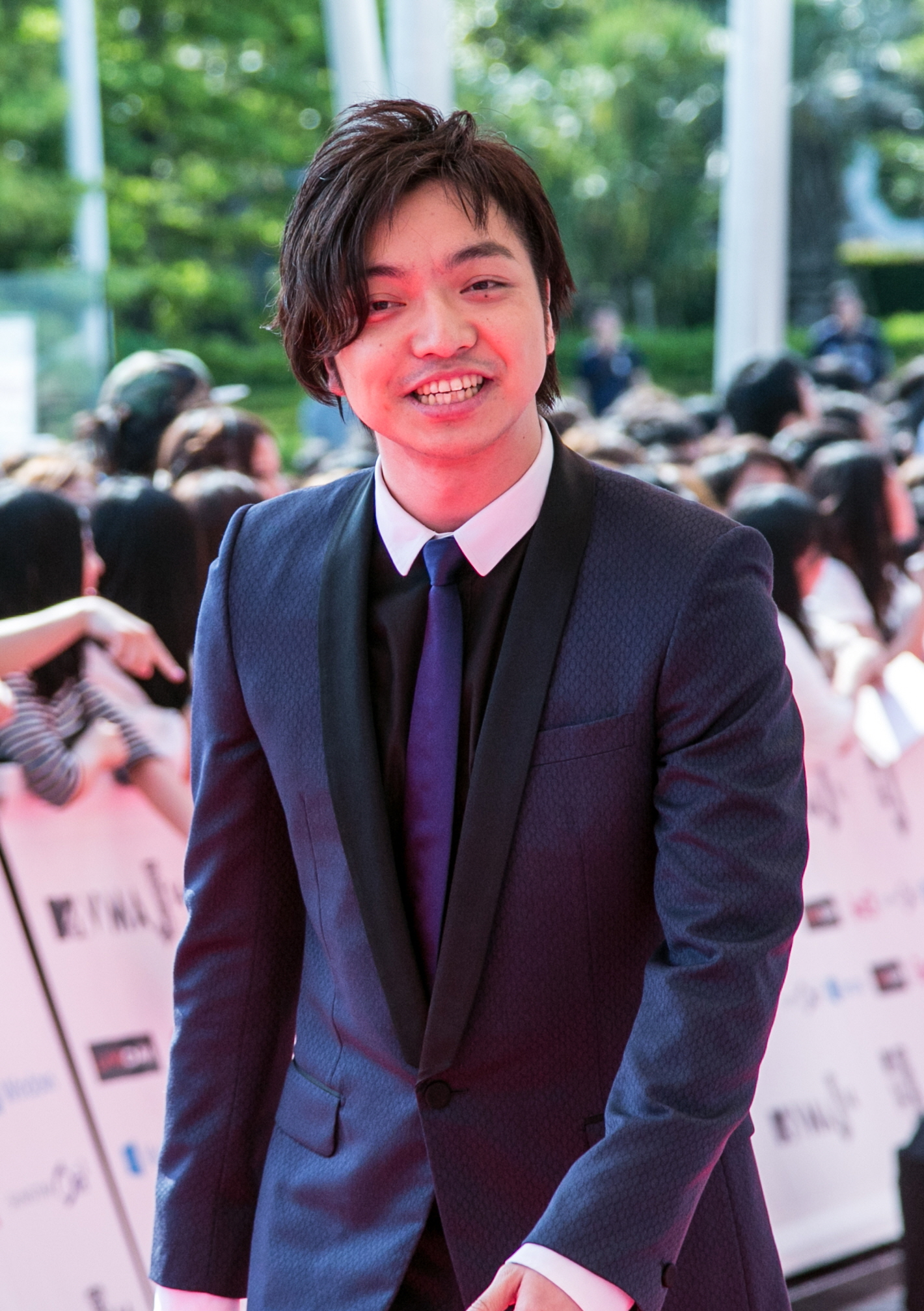
Daichi Miura at the 2014 MTV VMAJ. The singer won Best R&B Video for "I'm on Fire".

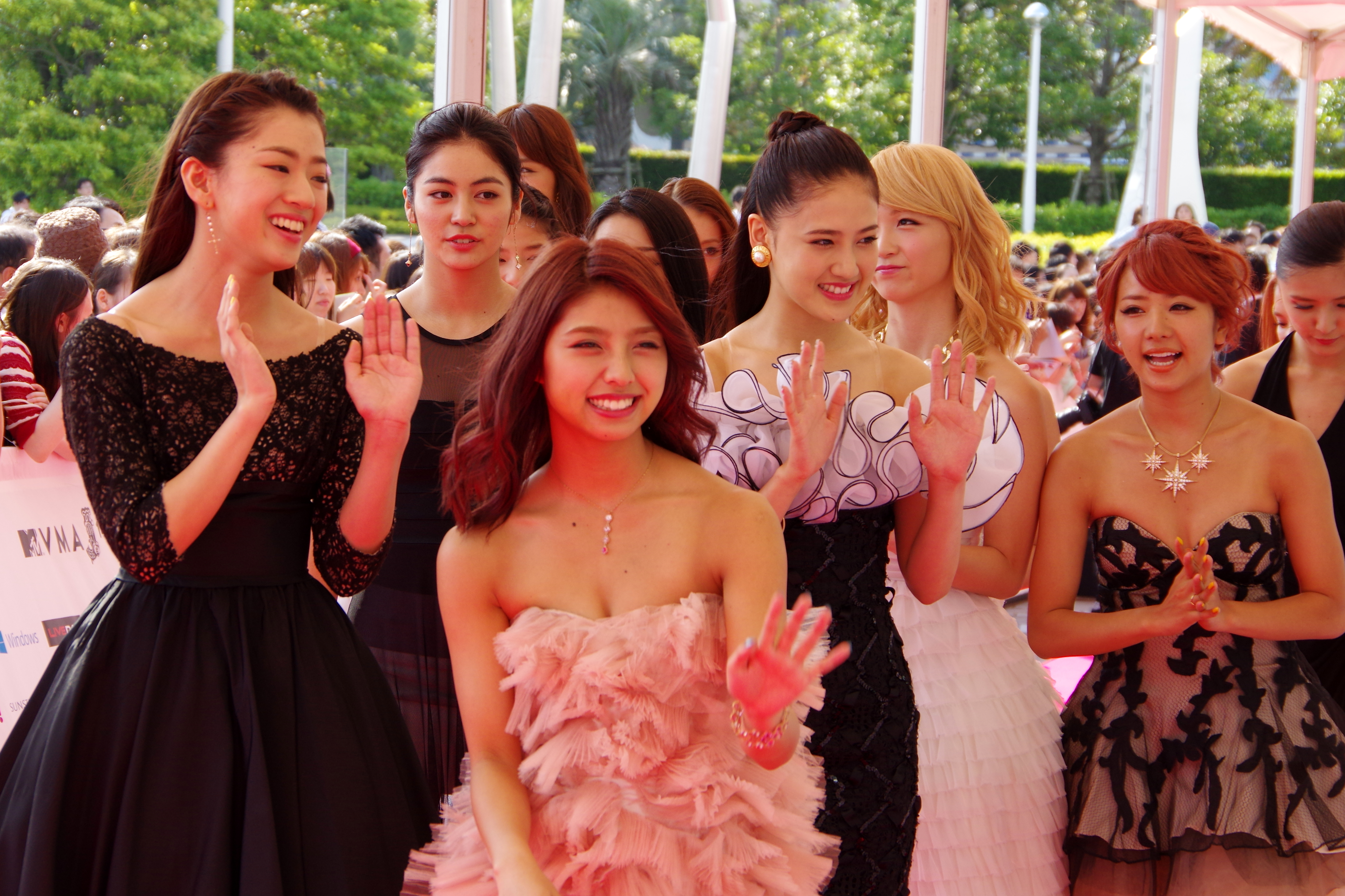
E-girls at the 2014 MTV VMAJ. The group won Best Choreography for "Gomennasai no Kissing You".

Nominees were selected from among Western and Japanese music and music videos released in Japan between March 1, 2013, and February 28, 2014. Nominations were released on March 28, 2014. Voting began that same day, via the MTV VMAJ website, and took place until May 28. Beyoncé and Kyary Pamyu Pamyu tied for the most nominations of any artist that year with three each. The latter became the most awarded artist of the night after winning two of her three nominations. Exile won their fifth Video of the Year award—they first won it in 2008—setting a new record in MTV VMAJ history.

Winners are highlighted in bold.

Best Video of the Year	Best Album of the Year
**Exile — "Exile Pride ~Konnasekaiwoaisurutame~"**; Katy Perry — "Roar"; Namie Amuro — "Ballerina"; Lady Gaga — "Applause"; Mr. Children — "REM"	**Kyary Pamyu Pamyu — Nanda Collection**; Beyoncé — Beyoncé; Daft Punk — Random Access Memories; Maximum the Hormone — Yoshū Fukushū; J Soul Brothers III — Blue Impact
Best Male Video	Best Female Video
**Exile Atsushi — "Blue Dragon"**; Justin Timberlake — "Take Back the Night"; Miyavi — "Horizon"; Naoto Inti Raymi — "Koi Suru Kisetsu"; Robin Thicke featuring T.I. and Pharrell Williams — "Blurred Lines"	**Miley Cyrus — "We Can't Stop"**; Katy Perry — "Roar"; Namie Amuro — "Ballerina"; Beyoncé featuring Jay-Z — "Drunk in Love"; Sheena Ringo — "Irohanihoheto"
Best Group Video	Best New Artist Video
**Momoiro Clover Z — "Gounn"**; Ikimonogakari — "Egao"; One Direction — "Story of My Life"; J Soul Brothers III — "So Right"; Thirty Seconds to Mars — "Up in the Air"	**Ariana Grande — "Baby I"**; Kana-Boon — "Jyoushahissuinokotowari, Okotowari"; Rina Katahira — "Onna no Ko wa Nakanai"; Lorde — "Royals"; The Strypes — "Mystery Man"
Best Rock Video	Best Pop Video
**One Ok Rock — "Be the Light"**: Arctic Monkeys — "One for the Road"; Radwimps — "Last Virgin"; Sakanaction — "Good-Bye"; Vampire Weekend — "Diane Young"	**Lady Gaga — "Applause"**; Generations from Exile Tribe — "Hot Shot"; Icona Pop featuring Charli XCX — "I Love It"; Kyary Pamyu Pamyu — "Mottai Night Land"; Kana Nishino — "Believe"
Best R&B Video	Best Hip-Hop Video
**Daichi Miura — "I'm on Fire"**; Beyoncé featuring Jay-Z — "Drunk in Love"; Miliyah Kato — "Lonely Hearts"; Pharrell Williams — "Happy"; The Weeknd — "Belong to the World"	**Sky-Hi — "Ai Bloom"**; Eminem — "Berzerk"; Jay-Z featuring Justin Timberlake — "Holy Grail"; Macklemore & Ryan Lewis — "Same Love"; Rip Slyme — "Sly"
Best Reggae Video	Best Dance Video
**Lecca featuring Rhymester — "Sky is the Limit"**; Fire Ball — "Everything's So Nice"; Sean Paul — "Turn it Up"; Snoop Lion featuring Miley Cyrus — "Ashtrays and Heartbreaks"; Wakadanna — "Life is Mountain"	**Perfume — "Magic of Love"**; Avicii — "Wake Me Up"; Daft Punk featuring Pharrell Williams and Nile Rodgers — "Lose Yourself to Dance"; Disclosure — "F for You"; Tofubeats featuring G.Rina — "No.1"
Best Video from a Film	Best Collaboration Video
**Gen Hoshino — "Why Don't You Play in Hell?" (from Why Don't You Play in Hell?)**; Bump of Chicken — "Niji o Matsu Hito" (from Gatchaman); Metallica — "Master of Puppets" (from Metallica Through the Never); 2 Chainz and Wiz Khalifa — "We Own It (Fast & Furious)" (from Fast & Furious 6); Will.i.am — "Bang Bang" (from The Great Gatsby)	**T.M.Revolution × Nana Mizuki — "Preserved Roses"**; Jennifer Lopez featuring Pitbull — "Live It Up"; Man with a Mission featuring Takuma — "Database"; Robin Thicke featuring T.I. and Pharrell Williams — "Blurred Lines"; Soil & "Pimp" Sessions and Ringo Sheena — "Koroshiya Kiki Ippatsu"
Best Karaokee! Song	Best Choreography
**Kyary Pamyu Pamyu — "Mottai Night Land"**; Avril Lavigne — "Rock n Roll"; Kerakera — "Star Loveration"; One Direction — "Story of My Life"; Sekai no Owari — "RPG"	**E-girls — "Gomennasai no Kissing You"**; AKB48 — "Koisuru Fortune Cookie"; Ayame Goriki — "Tomodachiyori Daijinahito"; Justin Timberlake — "Take Back the Night"; Sara Bareilles — "Brave"
Most Share-worthy Video
**Kana Nishino – "Believe"**

== See also ==
- 2014 MTV Video Music Awards
- 2014 MTV Europe Music Awards
