= Mondai Girl =

- Limited Edition Cover

Single by Kyary Pamyu Pamyu

from the album KPP Best
- B-side: "KISEKAE"; "My Room"
- Released: March 18, 2015
- Recorded: July–December 2014
- Genre: J-pop
- Length: 31:08
- Label: Unborde
- Songwriter: Yasutaka Nakata
- Producer: Yasutaka Nakata

Kyary Pamyu Pamyu singles chronology
"Kira Kira Killer" (2014)	"Mondai Girl" (2015)	"Crazy Party Night ~Pumpkin no Gyakushū~" (2015)

Music video
- "Mondai Girl" on YouTube

"Mondai Girl" (もんだいガール, Mondai Gāru; lit. "Problem Girl") is the tenth physical single by Japanese singer Kyary Pamyu Pamyu, released on March 18, 2015. Released in both CD and digital editions, the single contains the A-side song "Mondai Girl" along with three B-side tracks. The single's title is a pun, coming from the phrase "mondai ga aru", literally "there is a problem".

"Mondai Girl" is used as the theme song for the Fuji Television drama series A Restaurant With Many Problems. The other tracks, "My Room" and "KISEKAE" are used in the CHINTAI room rental service and the New Nintendo 3DS commercials respectively.

== Background, Production & Release ==
This is Kyary's first release in nine months following her June 2014 release "Kira Kira Killer". In the meantime, Kyary went on two arena tours and released her 3rd studio album Pika Pika Fantajin. During one of her arena tours entitled "Kyary Pamyu Pamyu Colorful Panic Toy Box" She revealed at the last stop of the arena tour that she had been experiencing the darker side of fame saying that her privacy had been invaded and she simply had enough.

The first song, "My Room" was revealed in a commercial for CHINTAI room rental app service. The second song, "KISEKAE" was first revealed at the commercial for the New Nintendo 3DS before the handheld's launch at October 11, 2014, It was soon followed by a Christmas version in December 2014. In the same month, Kyary announced the next single's title and will serve as a theme song for the TV drama A Restaurant with Many Problems, which aired on January 15, 2015. Both KISEKAE and My Room are included as B-side tracks. Also included is a remix version of Kyary's 2012 single "Candy Candy".

== Track listing ==
All tracks are written by Yasutaka Nakata.

CD
No.	Title	Length
1.	"Mondai Girl" (もんだいガール Mondai Gāru; lit. "Problem Girl")	4:36
2.	"KISEKAE"	4:06
3.	"My Room"	4:34
4.	"CANDY CANDY -remix-"	4:32
5.	"Mondai Girl" (instrumental)	4:36
6.	"KISEKAE" (instrumental)	4:06
7.	"My Room" (instrumental)	4:34

== CD Artwork Personnel ==
Steve Nakamura – Art Director, Designer

Shinji Konishi – Hair & Makeup

Iijima Kumiko – Stylist

== Music video ==
The music video describes the concept of "strong woman" in three different worlds, in accordance with the kanji quadrigram "三者三様", which translates literally to "three people three styles" and means "everyone's different, to each his own". The first character in the video is Kyary in a completely pink outfit, as a young actress chased by paparazzi. The second one is a Kyary wild and free, dancing however she wants with foreign dancers. The third character, clad in all manners of black clothes, is Kyary fighting in a majestic animated world. Several scenes show Kyary and her problems, all in typical Kyary humour. The doll she is holding is similar in style to characters by famous Japanese artist Takashi Murakami.

Collaborating with the staff that has been present since her debut, and strictly following schedule, the scenes for the video were shot in one day in February 2015. First, in the cold metropolitan outdoors, they shot the scene where she's a celebrity wearing an outfit referencing "Legally Blonde", with a puppy plush toy and with a splash-curl (外ハネ) hairstyle. The shooting then moved to the studio in Kanagawa, to the scene featuring the outfit with the main pastel colors. While the color patterns are soft, with washed pink and soft yellow, the concept of "strong woman" is brought out with angular objects complexly handled. Then, with animation and a black outfit, a striking new side of Kyary is expressed. Then, as foreign artists are first brought into a Kyary production, a scene depicting difficulty in synchronizing hand gestures is shown.

The scene in the video where she sings in a microphone shaped like a walkie-talkie is a direct reference to Sekai no Owari's music video for Dragon Night, as Kyary had been dating singer and songwriter Fukase, and she wanted to make this fact public herself. Quotes from Kyary on the matter: "The point was to try and feature some personal and societal concerns in the video in a unique way." "Talking with music producer Yasutaka Nakata and video producer Jun Tamukai, I said 'Kyary has to do it that way', and many scenes barely got included".

Credits for the music video:

- production - direction - Jun Tamukai
- stylist - Kumiko Iijima
- hair & makeup - Minako Suzuki
- producer - Hiroshi Takayama (TC MAX)
