= Tainá Guedes =

- Born: Tainá Furuse Abigalil; Brazil
- Occupations: Artist; Curator; author; activist
- Known for: Food Art Week, Mottainai
- Website: tainaguedes.org

Tainá Guedes (born Tainá Furuse Abigalil) is a Brazilian contemporary artist and curator based in Berlin, Germany. Her work investigates the relationships between food, art, sustainability, and politics, using food as a medium for social and environmental reflection.

She is known for founding the interdisciplinary festival Food Art Week and for incorporating the Japanese concept of Mottainai into her artistic practice.

== Biography ==
Born in Brazil, Tainá is the daughter of the artist Omar Guedes and has a background influenced by Japanese culture. Originally trained as a chef, she expanded her work into visual arts and curating. She has lived and worked in Berlin since 2009.

== Work and themes ==
Guedes' practice encompasses installations, performances, sculptures, and participatory formats. Her works address themes such as food waste, mindful consumption, and invisible labor, often associated with the role of women in the food chain.

Recent exhibitions include projects like Unwater, which reflects on water scarcity and sustainability. A central element of her artistic philosophy is the concept of Mottainai, a Japanese term that conveys a sense of regret concerning waste, emphasizing respect for natural resources and circular cycles.

== Projects ==
=== Food Art Week ===
Guedes is the founder and artistic director of Food Art Week, a festival initiated in Berlin that expanded to other cities, including Paris. The event gathers artists, chefs, and researchers to explore food as a cultural and political medium through exhibitions and urban interventions.

== Publications ==
Tainá Guedes is the author of books combining cooking, photography, and artistic essays. Her book Die Küche der Achtsamkeit (The Kitchen of Mindfulness), published in Germany, received coverage from the local press for its holistic approach to sustainability and food culture.
