= Crazy Party Night (Pumpkin no Gyakushū) =

- Crazy Party Night ~Pumpkin no Gyakushū~ Regular Edition

Single by Kyary Pamyu Pamyu

from the album KPP Best
- B-side: "No No No"; "Oshiete Dance Floor"; "Kimama"
- Released: September 2, 2015
- Recorded: 2015
- Genre: J-pop, electropop, Halloween music
- Label: Unborde
- Songwriter: Yasutaka Nakata
- Producer: Yasutaka Nakata

Kyary Pamyu Pamyu singles chronology
"Mondai Girl" (2015)	"Crazy Party Night (Pumpkin no Gyakushū)" (2015)	"Sai & Co" (2016)

Music video
- "Crazy Party Night ~ぱんぷきんの逆襲~" on YouTube

"Crazy Party Night (Pumpkin no Gyakushū)" (Crazy Party Night ～ぱんぷきんの逆襲～, Kureijī Pātī Naito ~ Panpukin no Gyakushū ~; lit. "Crazy Party Night ~Pumpkin's Counterattack~") is the 11th single by Japanese model-singer Kyary Pamyu Pamyu, released on September 2, 2015. Releasing in both CD and digital editions, it is the first single recorded in 2015 as well as her second single release after Mondai Girl and contains songs tied into several commercials.

"Crazy Party Night (Pumpkin no Gyakushū)" is the trademark song used for Kyary's live nationwide tour, Crazy Party Night Tour. In 2017, she embarked a world tour titled "The Spooky Obakeyashiki: Pumpkins Strike Back". It is possible that the Crazy Party Night Tour acted as a precursor for the latter.

== Background, production and release ==
"Crazy Party Night (Pumpkin no Gyakushū)" is Kyary's second release in 2015 following her previous single "Mondai Girl". With the song being Halloween themed, composer Yasutaka Nakata stated the song was inspired by Kyary's love for fashion and dressing up and the title being a reference to the Japanese club culture of the '90s. Kyary's new tour reimagines a crazy night experience, and offers fans a chance to enjoy Kyary's music like dance music played at clubs. The song was later used as a promotional song for Coca-Cola Japan for their 2015 Halloween campaign.

Alongside the main song, it also includes other 3 songs composed by Nakata himself. These songs are used in several commercials: "No No No" for Ezaki Glico's Ice no Mi commercial, "Oshiete Dance Floor" for the Sharp Corporation's Aquos 4k LCD TV commercial in Japan and "Kimama" for the new Japanese commercial of Animal Crossing: New Leaf.

== Music video ==
=== Synopsis ===
'Crazy Party Night (~Pumpkin no Gyakushū~)' starts off with a figure sitting in a rocking chair who turns on the TV. The channel is showing "news reporter Kyary" who is outside a house preparing herself for broadcast. She then introduces herself and then leads the crew inside. As reporter Kyary enters the house, she encounters many weird "cute ghosts," such as the Red Dog (he looks like a bear), the TV, the Robot, and the Cake-head ghosts, as well as a rainbow-colored zombie. The zombie notices her and lunges at news reporter Kyary and scares her, making her eyes pop out in a cartoonish manner. The zombie then tries to tackle her but she evades. Two zombies then chase her, so reporter Kyary tries escaping through a door as the chorus starts. As she enters the main room, reporter Kyary finds "ghost Kyary" is leading a dance of the cute ghosts, singing the chorus. There are additional ghosts there, such as the Candy-head and Pumpkin-head ghosts. Reporter Kyary is dancing to the song as the chorus finishes.

Returning to news reporter Kyary, she leaves the main room and encounters the robot in the hallway, and attempts to interview him, but the zombies attack the TV crew, bringing the soundman to the ground. Reporter Kyary screams and runs back to the main room where ghost Kyary begins the chorus again. Reporter Kyary is mobbed by the cute ghosts, and when they draw back, ghost Kyary is there (did she transform?), and continues the chorus, but then news reporter Kyary bursts into the room again.

As the song builds, the figure watching TV constantly changes the channel rapidly, showing scenes from the video so far. During a refrain we then see "apron Kyary" in a kitchen cooking with a big red pot. She proceeds to put odd things in the pot, such as a puppy with baby human's head and a chicken with a dinosaur head into the pot. She then pours water from a kettle in, and puts the lid on the pot. She removes the lid, and a green ghost hand pops out of the pot.

The figure changes the channel back to the main room, where ghost Kyary is singing the chorus, with the zombies lurching around the room. Several different shots of ghost Kyary, the cute ghosts, and the zombies are shown, as they all party together.

As the song ends, the video crossfades to the soundman who was attacked by zombies, slowly zooming into his face. His eyes pop open, revealing he has become a zombie. it then cuts to the seated figure smiling at the camera, showing his eyes to reveal he is also a zombie, or perhaps is the soundman in the story, the music video being the story of how he became a zombie, though the ending is ambiguous.

=== Making ===
In the music video, news reporter Kyary sneaks in to investigate a party in an unspecified city location, and ends up getting lost in a world of horror and pop music. To quote Kyary herself "It is not only a scary video, but also reflects my own style of pop and straight forward humour".

For this music video, Kyary welcomes a new collaboration with director Yūsuke Tanaka. Kyary was dead set on having "a Halloween-like horror feeling", to go with the subtitle "ぱんぷきんの逆襲" (Pumpkin's counter-attack). Paying particular attention to the project schedule, the music video was shot in two days in the city. While orange and purple are the usual colours for Halloween costumes, Kyary wanted an outfit that reflected the fact that she's an adult, and had a costume designed in daring red and black. The zombie character who appears shows a unique "pop and kawaii zombie style", and along with the 6 other monster dancers (dog, robot, super hero, cake girl, candy man and pumpkin) emphasize the strange and extraneous world of Halloween. The choreography was specifically created to be danceable by adults and children, following the Halloween theme and giving the image of zombies and skeletons dancing, as well as tap dance per Kyary's special request.

The staff for the music video is as follows:

- Director - Yūsuke Tanaka
- Fashion designer - Iijima Kumiko
- Hair and make-up artist - Shinji Konishi (小西紳士)
- Choreographer - I COULD NEVER BE A DANCER（a choreographer duo based in Paris）
- Set construction - magma

== Track listing ==
All tracks are written by Yasutaka Nakata.

CD
No.	Title	Length
1.	"Crazy Party Night (Pumpkin no Gyakushū)"	4.14
2.	"No No No"	4.08
3.	"Oshiete Dance Floor" (おしえてダンスフロア Oshiete Dansufuroa; lit. "Tell me Dance Floor")	3.05
4.	"Kimama" (きまま ; lit. "Carefree")	3.15
5.	"Crazy Party Night (Pumpkin no Gyakushū)" (instrumental)	4.14
6.	"No No No" (instrumental)	4.08
7.	"Oshiete Dance Floor" (instrumental)	3.05
8.	"Kimama" (instrumental)	3.15

== CD Artwork Personnel ==
Steve Nakamura – Art Director, Designer.
