= Kavkanize =

- Standard CD edition and digital download versions' cover

Studio album by Kavka Shishido
- Released: September 4, 2013
- Recorded: 2012–2013
- Genre: Rock, pop
- Length: 1:02:43
- Language: Japanese
- Label: Imperial Records

Kavka Shishido chronology
Kavkanize (2013)	K^{5} (2015)

Alternative cover
- Limited CD/DVD and deluxe editions' cover

Singles from Kavkanize
- 1. "Day Dream Rider" Released: May 16, 2012; 2. "Aisuru Kakugo" Released: September 19, 2012; 3. "Music" Released: February 20, 2013; 4. "Kiken na Futari" Released: May 22, 2013; 5. "Wagamama" / "Miss. Miss Me" Released: January 29, 2014; 6. "Dame Kashira?" Released: July 2, 2014

Kavkanize (カフカナイズ, Kafukanaizu) is the debut studio album by Japanese drummer and singer Kavka Shishido, released on September 9, 2013.

== Background and development ==
Shishido had been working as a musician since 2004, when she debuted as a drummer in the band The News as their third drummer. In 2005, Shishido started collaborating with The High-Lows' drummer Kenji Ohshima and Uverworld producer Satoru Hiraide, and made a band called Eddy12 together. During this period, Shishido started to perform in her signature style, performing the drums and singing simultaneously. While in Eddy12, Shishido was scouted by a record company for her to debut as a solo musician. She was scouted before she started performing the drums as part of her act, but added them back in during discussions for how to set her apart from other musicians. She left The News in 2009, however continued to work with her Eddy12 bandmates who act as producers. She debuted under Imperial Records with the digital single "Day Dream Rider" in May 2012.

== Writing and production ==
Album production for the songs not found on singles began in mid June, and lasted until the end of July. The album was created in collaboration with Satoru Hiraide and Kenji Ohshima. Shishido served as the primary lyricist for the project. The album's title, Kavkanize is a portmanteau of "Kavka" and "organize", because she and her staff felt as if they had organized an amusement park in making the album.

Shishido wanted to use one B-side from each of her singles, as she felt that she had not released any throwaway songs. The first song chosen for the album was the pop-rock "Love Corrida", which was recorded so that Shishido could expand her musical range. "Love Corrida" served as the basis for inspiration for the rest of the songs recorded for the album. The lyrics of the song were written together with singer and DJ Silva, who Shishido met through a friend. The pair wrote the song by email. "Futatsu no Taiyō" was written by Akiko Noma, formerly of the band GO!GO!7188, who was a contact of Ohshima's. Several songs were much older, such as "Gunjō" which was from before her debut. "Engine", "Shinkaigyo" and "Tobenai Tori" were all songs that Shishido had performed at live concerts, however "Tobenai Tori" was completely rewritten and retitled for the album.

"The Outsiders" is the first song sung entirely in English by Shishido, even though she does not consider herself an English speaker. When creating the song, producer Ohshima was inspired to add a rap section. The director who introduced Silva to Shishido knew rapper Dohzi-T, who agreed to appear as he thought rapping on top of a rock sound would be interesting as he'd never done something like that before.

== Album jacket ==
The standard edition cover depicts Shishido with crow feathers in her hair, while the limited-edition version features a crow with a long, black wig in the style of Shishido's hair. The pictures were shot by photographer Itaru Hirama, and the photo shoot was intended as a self-introduction, due to Shishido being associated with crows.

== Promotion and release ==
The song "Kiken na Futari" was used as the opening theme song for the drama Doubles: Futari no Keiji, while "Day Dream Rider" was used as the ending theme song for the TV Tokyo variety show Fes Iwao. Prior to the release of the album, a video was released for the song "Love Corrida", which served as the leading promotional track on the album. It was released as a preceding download on August 7, 2013.

In February 2014, Shishido held her first Japanese tour, after releasing her next single "Wagamama" / "Miss. Miss Me". In July, Shishido released the digital single "Dame Kashira?". The song's visuals featured a very different image of Shishido, showing her in a more girly style, while the musiv video featured her dancing.

In September, it was announced that Shishido had switched labels to the newly created Justa Music, a sub-label of Avex Group, and would star in the second series of Erika Sawajiri fashion drama First Class. Her first release under the label was the song "Don't Be Love" featuring veteran singer-songwriter Kazuyoshi Saito, and will be used as the theme song of the 2015 Fuji Television drama Isha-tachi no Ren'ai Jijō. This song also serves as the leading track from K^{5}, a special extended play where Shishido collaborated with five different musicians, released in June 2015.

Imperial Records announced that Kavkanize would be re-released in July 2015, compiling the singles released after Kavkanize, as well as all of Shishido's Imperial-era music videos.

== Critical reception ==
CDJournal reviewers praised the album as elegant, and felt even though she was most talked about for her visual aspects, her "deep flavoured" vocals and "rhythmic numbers" deserved praise. For the album's singles, they gave "Aisuru Kakugo" a star for high recommendation, calling it "impacting, first degree burn glam rock". They felt that "Music"'s lyrics were "numbing", and the melody "frantic", and that her "rock older sister" dress and singing style fitted "Kiken na Futari" perfectly.

Sayako Oku of Skream! noted the variety found on the album compared to her exclusively rock sound before the release, such as the "party tunes" "Love Corrida" and "Hyaku-nen Beer", and praised her vocals and drumming.

== Track listing ==
No.	Title	Lyrics	Music	Length
1.	"Day Dream Rider" (デイドリームライダー Dei Dorīmu Raidā)	Kavka Shishido	Satoru Hiraide	3:38
2.	"Love Corrida" (ラヴコリーダ Ravu Korīda)	Shishido, Silva	Hiraide	4:16
3.	"Kiken na Futari" (キケンなふたり, "Dangerous Us")	Shishido	Kenji Ohshima (music), Shogo Ohnishi (arrangement)	3:14
4.	"Engine" (エンジン Enjin)	Shishido	Hiraide	4:11
5.	"Shinkaigyo" (シンカイギョ, "Deep Sea Fish")	Shishido	Ohshima	5:03
6.	"Muteki no Rock Star" (無敵のロックスター, "Invincible Rock Star")	Shishido	Ohshima	2:57
7.	"Makenai Game" (負けないゲーム, "Unlosing Game")	Shishido	Hiraide	3:59
8.	"Futatsu no Taiyō" (2つの太陽, "Two Suns")	Akiko Noma	Ohshima (music and arrangement), Yūji Morimoto (arrangement)	3:35
9.	"Gunjō" (群青, "Ultramarine")	Shishido	Ohshima (music and arrangement), Morimoto (arrangement)	5:03
10.	"Countdown" (カウントダウン Kauntodaun)	Shishido	Ohshima	3:48
11.	"Aisuru Kakugo" (愛する覚悟, "Ready to Love")	Shishido	Hiraide	3:10
12.	"Hyaku-nen Beer" (100年ビール, "100 Years of Beer")	Shishido	Hiraide	3:45
13.	"Tobenai Tori" (飛ベナイ鳥, "Flightless Bird")	Shishido	Hiraide	4:00
14.	"The Outsiders" (featuring Dohzi-T)	Shishido, Dohzi-T	Ohshima (music and arrangement), Morimoto (arrangement)	3:40
15.	"Tsuki no Kagayakikata" (月の輝きかた, "The Way the Moon Shines")	Shishido	Hiraide	4:23
16.	"Music"	Shishido	Hiraide	3:40
Total length:				1:02:43

Deluxe Edition bonus tracks
No.	Title	Lyrics	Music	Length
17.	"Wagamama" (我が儘, "Selfishness")	Shishido, Noma	Ohshima	4:30
18.	"Miss. Miss Me" (Miss.ミスミー)	Shishido	Ohshima	3:54
19.	"Dame Kashira?" (ダメかしら？, "Is It Bad?")	Shishido	Hiraide	3:38
Total length:				1:14:45

Initial release DVD
No.	Title	Length
1.	"Love Corrida (Long Interview Ver.)"

Deluxe Edition DVD
No.	Title	Length
1.	"Day Dream Rider"
2.	"Aisuru Kakugo"
3.	"Music"
4.	"Kiken na Futari"
5.	"Love Corrida"
6.	"Wagamama / Miss. Miss Me"
7.	"Dame Kashira?"

== Chart rankings ==
Charts (2013)	Peak position
Japan Oricon weekly albums	31

=== Sales and certifications ===
Chart	Amount
Oricon physical sales	6,000

== Release history ==
Region	Date	Format	Distributing Label	Catalogue codes
Japan	September 4, 2013	CD, CD/DVD, digital download	Imperial Records	TECI-1369, TECI-1368
Japan	September 21, 2013	Rental CD	Imperial Records	TECI-1369
Japan	July 22, 2015	Deluxe Edition	Imperial Records	TECI-1462
