= Otona na no yo! / 1oku 3zenman Sō Diet Ōkoku =

Single by Berryz Kobo

from the album Kanjuku Berryz Kobo The Final Completion Box
- Released: February 19, 2014
- Recorded: 2014
- Genre: J-pop; pop; EDM; electropop
- Label: Piccolo Town
- Songwriter: Tsunku
- Producer: Tsunku

Berryz Kobo singles chronology
"Motto Zutto Issho ni Itakatta / Rock Érotique" (2013)	"Otona na no yo! / 1oku 3zenman Sō Diet Ōkoku" (2014)	"Ai wa Itsumo Kimi no Naka ni / Futsū, Idol 10nen Yatterannai Desho!?" (2014)

Music videos
- "Otona na no yo!" on YouTube
- "1oku 3zenman Sō Diet Ōkoku" on YouTube

"Otona na no yo! / 1oku 3zenman Sō Diet Ōkoku" (大人なのよ！／1億3千万総ダイエット王国) is the 34th single by Japanese idol group Berryz Kobo, released in Japan on February 19, 2014.

The physical CD single debuted at 4th place in the Japanese Oricon weekly singles chart.

== Charts ==
Chart (2014)	Peak position
Japan (Oricon Daily Singles Chart)	2
Japan (Oricon Weekly Singles Chart)	4
