= Golden Chinatown / Sayonara Usotsuki no Watashi =

"Golden Chinatown/Sayonara Usotsuki no Watashi"

Single by Berryz Kobo

from the album Berryz Kobo Special Best Vol. 2
- B-side: "Sayonara Usotsuki no Watashi" (Regular, Limited A, B, C Editions)
- Released: June 19, 2013 (Japan)
- Genre: J-pop
- Label: Zetima
- Songwriter: Tsunku
- Producer: Tsunku

Berryz Kobo singles chronology
"Asian Celebration" (2013)	"Golden Chinatown/Sayonara Usotsuki no Watashi" (2013)	"Motto Zutto Issho ni Itakatta / Rock Érotique" (2013)

Music video
- "Golden Chinatown" on YouTube "Sayonara Usotsuki no Watashi" on YouTube

Professional ratings
Review scores
Source	Rating
Billboard Japan	Favorable

Golden Chinatown / Sayonara Usotsuki no Watashi (ゴールデンチャイナタウン／サヨナラ ウソつきの私, Gōruden Chaina Taun/Sayonara Usotsuki Watashi; "Golden China Town/Goodbye to the Lying Me") is Berryz Kobo's 32nd single. which was released on June 19, 2013 in 5 versions: 1 regular version and 4 Limited Editions.

The album sold an estimated 36,000 copies, reaching 6th on the weekly Orion charts.

== Track list ==
- Golden Chinatown
- Sayonara Usotsuki no Watashi
- Golden Chinatown (instrumental)
- Sayonara Usotsuki no Watashi (instrumental)
- Hacked by Code:51 NeoRaz3r

=== Limited edition A DVD ===
- Golden Chinatown (music video)
- Golden Chinatown (dance shot ver.)

=== Limited edition B DVD ===
- Sayonara Usotsuki no Watashi (music video)
- Sayonara Usotsuki no Watashi (dance shot ver.)

=== Limited edition C DVD ===
- Golden Chinatown (close-up ver.)
- Sayonara Usotsuki no Watashi (close-up ver.)
- Making of

=== Event V "Golden Chinatown" ===
- Golden Chinatown (Shimizu Saki solo ver.)
- Golden Chinatown (Tsugunaga Momoko solo ver.)
- Golden Chinatown (Tokunaga Chinami solo ver.)
- Golden Chinatown (Sudo Maasa solo ver.)
- Golden Chinatown (Natsuyaki Miyabi solo Ver.)
- Golden Chinatown (Kumai Yurina solo ver.)
- Golden Chinatown (Sugaya Risako solo ver.)

=== Event V "Sayonara Usotsuki no Watashi" ===
- Sayonara Usotsuki no Watashi (Shimizu Saki solo ver.)
- Sayonara Usotsuki no Watashi (Tsugunaga Momoko solo ver.)
- Sayonara Usotsuki no Watashi (Tokunaga Chinami solo ver.)
- Sayonara Usotsuki no Watashi (Sudo Maasa solo ver.)
- Sayonara Usotsuki no Watashi (Natsuyaki Miyabi solo ver.)
- Sayonara Usotsuki no Watashi (Kumai Yurina solo ver.)
- Sayonara Usotsuki no Watashi (Sugaya Risako solo ver.)

== Featured members ==
- Shimizu Saki
- Tsugunaga Momoko
- Tokunaga Chinami
- Sudo Maasa
- Natsuyaki Miyabi
- Kumai Yurina
- Sugaya Risako

== TV performances ==
- [2013.06.05] IDOL REVUE MUSiC×iD

== Concert performances ==
- Golden Chinatown—Berryz Koubou Concert Tour 2013 Haru ~Berryz Mansion Nyuukyosha Boshuuchuu!~
- Sayonara Usotsuki no Watashi—Hello! Project Yaon Premium Live ~Soto Fest~, Hello! Project 2013 SUMMER COOL HELLO! ~Mazekoze~

== Song Information ==
Golden Chinatown

- Lyrics & composition: Tsunku
- Arrangement: Suzuki Shunsuke
- Vocals:
  - Main vocals: Tsugunaga Momoko, Kumai Yurina
  - Minor vocals: Shimizu Saki
  - Center vocals: Natsuyaki Miyabi, Sugaya Risako

Sayonara Usotsuki no Watashi

- Lyrics and composition: Tsunku
- Arrangement: Hirata Shoichiro
- Vocals:
  - Main vocals: Natsuyaki Miyabi, Sugaya Risako
  - Minor vocals: Tsugunaga Momoko

== Chart positions ==
Chart	Peak position
Oricon Daily Chart	5
Oricon Weekly Chart	6

Total reported sales: 36,023
