= Kavka Shishido =

Kavka Shishido シシド・カフカ
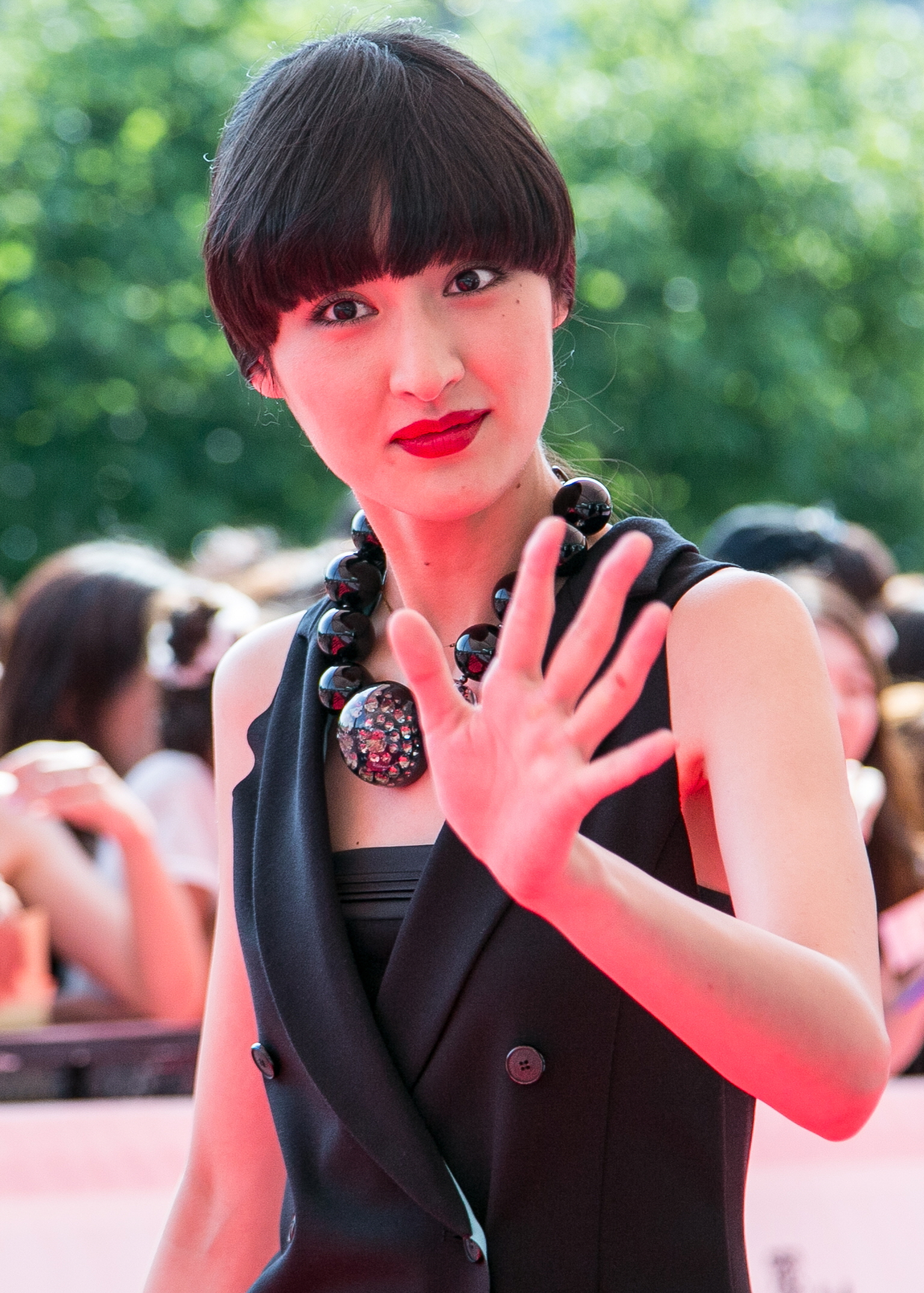
- Shishido at the 2014 MTV Video Music Awards Japan

Background information
- Born: Yuna Shishido; June 23, 1985 (age 41); Mexico City, Mexico
- Origin: Japan
- Genres: Pop, rock
- Occupations: Singer-songwriter, drummer, spokesperson, radio personality, television personality, actress
- Instruments: Drums, vocals
- Years active: 2004–present
- Labels: Imperial, Justa
- Formerly of: The News
- Website: shishido-kavka.jp

Yuna Shishido (宍戸佑名, Shishido Yūna; born June 23, 1985), known as a solo artist by the stage name Kavka Shishido (シシド・カフカ, Shishido Kafuka; stylized in Japan as SHISHIDO KAVKA) is a Mexican-born Japanese drummer and vocalist. Originally a member of the rock band The News, she debuted as a solo musician in 2012 and released her debut album Kavkanize in 2013. She prominently plays the drums in all of her promotions.

Shishido was given the name "Kavka" for her stage name by copy editor Junpei Watanabe. Shishido always wore black, reminiscent of a crow. The Czech word kavka refers to the daurian jackdaw.

== Biography ==
Shishido was born in Mexico in 1985 to Japanese parents. She lived there until she was two, later going to Japan for elementary school. Between the ages of 13 and 14, Shishido lived in Argentina. She learned Spanish to use in her daily life, though on returning to Japan forgot it since she had nobody with whom to practice. When she was 14, Shishido was inspired to take up the drums after seeing a live performance on TV. She enjoyed the idea of the drummer being an "unsung hero" of the band, after noticing the camera never focused on the drummer. She was first taught the basics of drumming at 14, by Daniel "Pipi" Piazzolla, a drummer and grandson of tango musician Astor Piazzolla.

Shishido started performing with her own vocals at age 20. In 2004, Shishido joined the all-female band The News as their third drummer. In 2005, Shishido started collaborating with The High-Lows' drummer Kenji Ohshima and Uverworld producer Satoru Hiraide, and made a band called Eddy12 (stylized as eddy12) together. During this period, Shishido started to perform in her signature style, performing the drums and singing simultaneously.

While in Eddy12, Shishido was scouted by a record company for her to debut as a solo musician. She was scouted before she started performing the drums as part of her act, but added them back in during discussions for how to set her apart from other musicians. She left The News in 2009, however continued to work with her Eddy12 bandmates who act as producers. She debuted under Imperial Records with the digital single "Day Dream Rider" in May 2012. Since then, Shishido released three physical singles, "Aisuru Kakugo", "Music" and "Kiken na Futari". The latter was used as the opening theme song for the TV Asahi drama Doubles: Futari no Keiji. Shishido released her debut album, Kavkanize, on September 4, 2013. In February 2014, Shishido held her first Japanese tour after the release of her single "Wagamama"/"Miss. Miss Me".

In September, it was announced that Shishido had switched labels to the newly created Justa Music, a sub-label of Avex Group, and would star in the second series of Erika Sawajiri fashion drama First Class. Her first release under the label is the song "Don't Be Love" featuring veteran singer-songwriter Kazuyoshi Saito, and will be used as the theme song of the 2015 Fuji Television drama Isha-tachi no Ren'ai Jijō. This song also serves as the leading track from K^{5}, a special extended play where Shishido will collaborate with five different musicians, released in June 2015.

== Other ventures ==
Since her debut as a musician, Shishido has worked as a runway model. She has participated in the Kobe Collection 2012, Tokyo Runway in 2012 and 2013, Laforet Fashion Week 2012, and Fukuoka Asia Collection 2013. Shishido made her acting debut in the live action film adaptation of Ai Ore! in 2012. Shishido debuted as a radio personality in 2013, and has radio shows on All Night Nippon and Bay FM. Shishido also became the drummer for the house band on the KinKi Kids' variety show Shin Dōmoto Kyōdai in 2013. In 2014 she joined the second season of the Erika Sawajiri drama First Class, as fashion designer Namie Kawashima. Since October 21, 2018 Shishido Kavka and Santiago Vazquez invite several musicians to an improvised presentation called "el tempo", which interacts with the public through hand signals, inspired by the events “LA BOMBA DE TIEMPO” and “LA GRANDE” that have been taking place since 2006 in Buenos Aires, where she grew up.

=== Products and endorsements ===
Shishido starred in her first nationwide commercial for Glico's snack food Pretz, which debuted in February 2013. It features Shishido playing the drums in the Strahov Monastery library in Prague.

== Discography ==
=== Studio albums ===
List of albums, with selected chart positions
Title	Album details	Peak positions	Sales (JPN)
Title	Album details	JPN	Sales (JPN)
Kavkanize	Released: September 4, 2013 (JPN); Label: Imperial Records; Formats: CD, CD/DVD, digital download	31	6,000
Toridori (トリドリ; "Various")	Released: April 27, 2016 (JPN); Label: Avex Trax; Formats: CD, CD/DVD, CD/Blu-ray, digital download	75	
DOUBLE TONE	Released: July 25, 2018 (JPN); Label: Avex Trax; Formats: 2CD, 2CD/DVD, digital download	82	

=== Extended plays ===
List of extended plays, with selected chart positions
Title	Album details	Peak positions	Sales (JPN)
Title	Album details	JPN	Sales (JPN)
K^{5}	Released: June 27, 2015 (JPN); Label: Avex Trax; Formats: CD, CD/DVD, digital download	29	4,000
DO_S	Released: February 18, 2017 (JPN); Label: Avex Trax; Formats: CD, CD/DVD, digital download	119	663

=== Singles ===
==== As a lead artist ====
Title	Year	Peak chart positions		Sales (JPN)	Album
Title	Year	Oricon Singles Charts	Billboard Japan Hot 100 (Note: Sources for chart positions are as follows: "Day Dream Rider", "Aisuru Kakugo", "Music", "Kiken na Futari", "Love Corrida", "Wagamama", "Dame Kashira?" "Don't Be Love".)	Sales (JPN)	Album
"Day Dream Rider" (デイドリームライダー, Dei Dorīmu Raidā)	2012	—	15		Kavkanize
"Aisuru Kakugo" (愛する覚悟; "Ready to Love")	2012	59	7	2,000	Kavkanize
"Music"	2013	87	12	2,000	Kavkanize
"Kiken na Futari" (キケンなふたり; "Dangerous Us")	2013	63	14	2,000	Kavkanize
"Wagamama" (我が儘; "Selfishness")	2014	52	20	2,000	Kavkanize (Deluxe Edition)
"Miss. Miss Me" (Miss. ミスミー, Misu Misumī)	2014	52	— (Note: Charted at number 98 on the Hot Top Airplay chart.)	2,000	Kavkanize (Deluxe Edition)
"Dame Kashira?" (ダメかしら?; "Is It Bad?")	2014	—	76		Kavkanize (Deluxe Edition)

==== As a featured artist ====
Title	Year	Peak chart positions		Album
Title	Year	Oricon Singles Charts	Billboard Japan Hot 100	Album
"Beni no Prologue" (紅のプロローグ; "Crimson Prologue") (among And Roses)	2016	—	—	Non-album single
SYNERGY (M-flo)	2016	—	—	Higanjima: Deluxe OST / Double Tone
"Get Into My Heart" (vs Miyavi)	2018	—	—	Samurai Sessions, Vol. 3: Worlds Collide

==== Promotional singles ====
Title	Year	Peak chart positions	Album
Title	Year	Billboard Japan Hot 100	Album
"Love Corrida" (ラヴコリーダ, Ravu Korīda)	2013	7	Kavkanize
"Don't Be Love" (featuring Kazuyoshi Saito)	2015	53	K^{5} / Toridori
"Bane no Uta" (バネのうた; "Coil Song") (featuring Hiroto Kōmoto (The Cro-Magnons))	2015	— (Note: Charted at number 34 on the Radio Songs subchart.)	K^{5} / Toridori
"Crying"	2016	—	Toridori
"Ashita o Narase" (明日を鳴らせ; "Ring Out Tomorrow")	2016	—	Toridori
"Haneda burūsu" (羽田ブルース, "Haneda Blues") feat. Ken Yokoyama with Crazy Ken Band	2017	—	DOUBLE TONE
"Shinjuku sanobagan (SON OF A GUN)" (新宿サノバガン（SON OF A GUN）, "Shinjuku SON OF A GUN")	2017	—	DOUBLE TONE
"zamza" feat. Nobuaki Kaneko	2017	—	DOUBLE TONE
"Hold My Hand"	2019	—	TBA

=== Participation in albums ===
Title	Year	Peak chart positions	Album	Note
Title	Year	Billboard Japan Hot 100	Album	Note
"Over The Top"	2014	4	" LINDBERG TRIBUTE ~Minna no Lindberg~" (LINDBERG TRIBUTE ~みんなのリンドバーグ~, LINDBERG TRIBUTE ~Everyone's Lindberg~)	LINDBERG Tribute Album
"Calling Dr. Love"	2016	15	Kiss & Maekup	Kiss Tribute Album
"Time Is Blue"	2016	—	TOKU 『Dear Mr. SINATRA Special Edition』	Frank Sinatra Tribute Album
"(I Can't Get No) Satisfaction feat. Shishido Kavka & Tsuchiya Kohei"	2017	—	TOKU 『Shake』	The Rolling Stones Tribute Album
"Metal Guru"	2017	—	T. Rex Tribute ~Sitting Next To You~ presented by Rama Amoeba	T. Rex Tribute Album
"You'll Be in My Heart"	2017	—	Thank You Disney	Disney Tribute Album
"Remember Me (End Song) feat. Tokyo Ska Paradise Orchestra"	2018	—	Coco OST/ DOUBLE TONE	Japanese dubbed version of movie

== Filmography ==
=== Film ===
Year	Title	Role	Notes	Ref.
2015	Deadman Inferno	Naomi		
2016	Too Young to Die!	Asura		
2023	Revolver Lily	Naka		
2025	ChaO	Maibei (voice)		
2025	Purehearted	Keiko Itokazu		

=== Television ===
Year	Title	Role	Notes	Ref.
2014	First Class	Namie Kawashima		
2017	Hiyokko	Sanae Kusaka	Asadora	
2020	Akira Hamura: The Unluckiest Detective in the World	Akira Hamura	Lead role	
2026	Plastic Beauty			
