= Mottainai Bāsan =

Japanese children's book

Mottainai Grandma
- Author: Mariko Shinju
- Original title: もったいないばあさん
- Language: Japanese
- Publisher: Kodansha
- Publication date: 2004
- Publication place: Japan
- Website: http://mottainai.com/e/

Mottainai Bāsan (もったいないばあさん; English-Japanese and English-Hindi bilingual editions published under the translated title Mottainai Grandma, and also known as The Waste-Not-Want-Not Grandmother or No-Waste Grandma) is the first book from the "Mottainai Grandma" series written by Japanese author Mariko Shinju. The book was published in 2004. The Japanese word mottainai means "don't be wasteful" or "what a waste!"

On January 13, 2018, it was released in Hindi and English translation in New Delhi, India, by the Japan International Cooperation Agency. An earlier Japanese-English bilingual edition (pictured) was published by Kodansha in November 2005.

Shinju started having ideas about writing the book while trying to explain wastefulness to her child.
