= Motto Zutto Issho ni Itakatta / Rock Érotique =

Single by Berryz Kobo

from the album Berryz Kobo Special Best Vol. 2
- A-side: "Motto Zutto Issho ni Itakatta"; "Rock Érotique"
- B-side: "I'm So Cool!" (Regular Ed., Lim. Ed. A, B, C); "Koisuru Technique" (Lim. Ed. D)
- Released: October 2, 2013 (Japan)
- Genre: J-pop
- Label: Piccolo Town
- Songwriter: Tsunku
- Producer: Tsunku

Berryz Kobo singles chronology
"Golden Chinatown / Sayonara Usotsuki no Watashi" (2013)	"Motto Zutto Issho ni Itakatta / Rock Érotique" (2013)	"Otona na no yo! / 1oku 3zenman Sō Diet Ōkoku" (2014)

Music video
- "Motto Zutto Issho ni Itakatta" "Rock Érotique" on YouTube

Professional ratings
Review scores
Source	Rating
Billboard Japan	Favorable

"Motto Zutto Issho ni Itakatta / Rock Érotique" (もっとずっと一緒に居たかった／ROCKエロティック; "I wish I could have stayed with you longer" / "Erotic rock") is the 33rd single by the Japanese idol group Berryz Kobo, released in Japan on October 2, 2013.

The physical CD single debuted at fourth place in the Japanese Oricon weekly singles chart.

== Release ==
The single was released in four versions: Limited Editions A, B, C, and D and a regular edition. Each edition has a different cover. All the limited editions came with a sealed-in serial-numbered entry card for the lottery to win a ticket to one of the single's launch events. The limited editions A, B, and C included a bonus DVD.

== Track listing ==
=== Regular Edition, Limited Editions A, B, C ===
All tracks are written by Tsunku.

CD
No.	Title	Length
1.	"Motto Zutto Issho ni Itakatta" (もっとずっと一緒に居たかった)
2.	"Rock Érotique" (ROCKエロティック)
3.	"I'm So Cool!" (I'm so cool!)
4.	"Motto Zutto Issho ni Itakatta (Instrumental)"
5.	"I'm So Cool! (Instrumental)"

Limited Edition A DVD
No.	Title	Length
1.	"Motto Zutto Issho ni Itakatta (Music Video)"
2.	"Motto Zutto Issho ni Itakatta (Dance Shot Ver.)"

Limited Edition B DVD
No.	Title	Length
1.	"Rock Érotique (Music Video)"
2.	"Rock Érotique (Dance Shot Ver.)"

Limited Edition C DVD
No.	Title	Length
1.	"Motto Zutto Issho ni Itakatta (Close-up Ver.)"
2.	"Rock Érotique (Close-up Ver.)"
3.	"Making-of" (メイキング映像)

=== Limited Edition D ===
All tracks are written by Tsunku.

CD
No.	Title	Length
1.	"Motto Zutto Issho ni Itakatta" (もっとずっと一緒に居たかった)
2.	"Rock Érotique" (ROCKエロティック)
3.	"Love Technique" (恋するテクニック)
4.	"Motto Zutto Issho ni Itakatta (Instrumental)"
5.	"I'm So Cool! (Instrumental)"

=== Bonus ===
Sealed into all the limited editions

- Event ticket lottery card with a serial number

== Charts ==
Chart (2012)	Peak position
Japan (Oricon Daily Singles Chart)	3
Japan (Oricon Weekly Singles Chart)	4
