= Crayon Shin-chan: Intense Battle! Robo Dad Strikes Back =

- Directed by: Wataru Takahashi
- Written by: Kazuki Nakashima
- Starring: Akiko Yajima; Keiji Fujiwara; Miki Narahashi; Satomi Korogi; Korokke; Emi Takei; Mari Mashiba; Tamao Hayashi; Teiyū Ichiryūsai; Chie Sato
- Music by: Toshiyuki Arakawa; Basil Poledouris; Goro Ohmi; Randy Edelman; Joe Hisaishi; Shogakukan
- Production company: Shin-Ei Animation
- Distributed by: Toho
- Release date: 19 April 2014
- Running time: 97 minutes
- Country: Japan
- Language: Japanese
- Box office: US$18,700,000 (JP¥1,820,708,58)

Crayon Shin-chan: Intense Battle! Robo Dad Strikes Back (クレヨンしんちゃん ガチンコ!逆襲のロボ とーちゃん, Kureyon Shin-chan: Gachinko! Gyakushu no Robo To-chan) is a 2014 Japanese comic science fiction anime film produced by Shogakukan. It is the 22nd film of the popular comedy manga and anime series Crayon Shin-chan, released in Japanese theaters on 19 April 2014. It is directed by Wataru Takahashi and the script is written by Kazuki Nakashima of Kill la Kill. The story of the movie was published as manga in the October issue of Manga Town, with script written by Nakashima and art by Aiba Kenta. This film was nominated for the Japanese Media Arts Festival in the animation award category.

The films deals with the themes of humans being replaced by robots in Japan due to its declining population& rise of anti-feminism.

== Plot ==
While playing with Shinnosuke "Shin" Nohara, Shin's father Hiroshi sprains his back. Desperate for treatment, Hiroshi accepts an invitation to a spa, which ends up transforming him into a robot. Despite initially disbelieving his identity, Hiroshi's wife, Misae eventually warms up to him while hiring private investigator Dandanbara Teruyo to track down the spa; Misae finally becomes convinced when Hiroshi rescues Shin and his friends during a field trip.

Omega Ranran, who had earlier invited Hiroshi to the spa, gives Shin a mustache add-on for Hiroshi; when plugged in, Hiroshi (who was accustomed to suffering domestic violence committed upon him by his wife) suddenly turns furiously misogynistic and starts an antifeminist campaign consisting of fathers having similar grievances. Shinchan and his friends manage to remove the mustache, though Hiroshi is captured by Tekkenji Doukatsu, Ranran's leader. Shin follows him to his factory, where he discovers Hiroshi in his human form; Hiroshi realizes that his robot version is simply a clone that has his memories. Shinchan and both versions of Hiroshi successfully stop the campaign, during which Hiroshi's robot defeats Tekkenji.

While both Hiroshis debate their real identity, the Noharas and Dandanbara are captured by Tekkenji, who is revealed to be a robot controlled by police chief Kuroiwa. Kuroiwa attributes his misogynistic attitude to years of abuse & neglect he endured from his own wife & daughter. Kuroiwa attempts to forcefeed Shinchan green bell-peppers (which he intensely dislikes) with Hiroshi's robot, though Shinchan manages to make Hiroshi's robot undo Kuroiwa's control. A battle ensues, extending from Kuroiwa's later-destroyed base to the construction site from Shinchan's earlier field trip, culminating in Shinchan and both Hiroshis teaming up to defeat Kuroiwa. After the battle, Dandanbara arrests Kuroiwa and Ganma for Offences they committed. After the human Hiroshi wins an arm wrestling match with his robot version, the latter succumbs to his wounds.

== Cast ==
- Akiko Yajima as Shinnosuke Nohara
- Keiji Fujiwara as Hiroshi Nohara and Robot Hiroshi
- Miki Narahashi as Misae Nohara
- Satomi Korogi as Himawari Nohara

=== Guest cast ===
- Korokke as Ganma Hakase
- Emi Takei as Dandanbara Teruyo

== Music ==
=== Opening theme song ===
- "Kimi ni 100 Percent" (Warner Music Japan) by Kyary Pamyu Pamyu

=== Ending theme song ===
- "Family Party" (Warner Music Japan) by Kyary Pamyu Pamyu

== International release ==
The film premiered in India in 2015 as Shinchan Movie: Robot Dad on Hungama TV.

== Reception ==
The film grossed a total of US$17,090,000 (JP¥1,820,000,000) in Japan. This was the fourth-largest grossing Crayon Shin-chan film in Japan as of 2015, and the second-largest grossing since the first two films in 1992 and 1993.

== Home media ==
The DVD and Blu-ray was released on 7 November 2014, by Bandai Visual.

== See also ==
- Crayon Shin-chan
- Yoshito Usui
