= Romance o Katatte / Towa no Uta =

Single by Berryz Kobo

from the album Kanjuku Berryz Kobo The Final Completion Box
- Released: November 12, 2014
- Recorded: 2014
- Genre: J-pop; pop; electropop
- Label: Piccolo Town
- Songwriter: Tsunku
- Producer: Tsunku

Berryz Kobo singles chronology
"Ai wa Itsumo Kimi no Naka ni / Futsū, Idol 10nen Yatterannai Desho!?" (2014)	"Romance o Katatte / Towa no Uta" (2014)

Music videos
- "Romance o Katatte" on YouTube
- "Towa no Uta" on YouTube

"Romance o Katatte / Towa no Uta" (ロマンスを語って／永久の歌) is the 36th and final single by Japanese girl idol group Berryz Kobo, released in Japan on November 12, 2014.

The physical CD single debuted at 2nd place in the Japanese Oricon weekly singles chart. According to Oricon, in its first week it sold 77,285 copies, becoming the group's best-selling CD single.

According to Oricon, it was also the 76th best-selling single of the whole year 2014 in Japan.

== Charts ==
Chart (2014)	Peak position
Japan (Oricon Daily Singles Chart)	2
Japan (Oricon Weekly Singles Chart)	2

=== Year-end charts ===
Chart (2014)	Peak position
Japan (Oricon Year-end Single Chart)	76
