= Yume no Hajima Ring Ring =

- Regular Edition cover

Single by Kyary Pamyu Pamyu

from the album Pika Pika Fantajin
- B-side: "Slow-mo"
- Released: February 26, 2014
- Recorded: November–December 2013
- Genre: J-pop
- Length: 3:22
- Label: Unborde
- Songwriter(s): Yasutaka Nakata
- Producer(s): Yasutaka Nakata

Kyary Pamyu Pamyu singles chronology
"Mottai Night Land" (2013)	"Yume no Hajima Ring Ring" (2014)	"Family Party" (2014)

Music video
- "Yume no Hajima Ring Ring" on YouTube

"Yume no Hajima Ring Ring" (ゆめのはじまりんりん, Yume no Hajima Rin Rin, lit. "The Beginning of a Ring-Dream") is the eighth physical single by J-pop artist Kyary Pamyu Pamyu, released on February 26, 2014 in both regular and limited editions. The song is used in a commercial for the Japanese room rental app Chintai while the B-Side "Slowmo" is used for Meganetop's ALOOK budget glasses commercials. The music video of the song was released on February 19, 2014.

== Development ==
The B-Side Slow-Mo was first heard on December 3, 2013 in the ALOOK glasses commercial, featuring Kyary dressed in an outfit made of glasses. On January 1, 2014, Kyary herself confirmed the new single, then untitled, in her new year's message. She announced the title later in her birthday concert "Kyary Pamyu Pamyu's Magical Wonder Castle" (きゃりーぱみゅぱみゅのマジカルワンダーキャッスル, Kyarīpamyupamyu no Majikaru Wandā Kyassuru) on January 18–19, 2014. The cover art and information on her 2nd World Tour was then later revealed by her recording label Unborde.

Kyary's plan for 2014 was "evolution", with the single's theme revolving on Graduation.

Kyary's first live performances of "Yume no Hajima Ring Ring" were at the North American leg of the Nanda Collection World Tour.

== Track listing ==
All tracks are written by Yasutaka Nakata

CD
No.	Title	Length
1.	"Yume no Hajima Ring Ring" (ゆめのはじまりんりん Yume no Hajima Rin Rin; lit. "The Beginning of a Ring-Dream")	3:22
2.	"Slowmo" (スローモ Surōmo)	3:34
3.	"Mottai Night Land" (extended mix)	4:51
4.	"Yume no Hajima Ring Ring" (instrumental)	3:22
5.	"Slowmo" (instrumental)	3:34

DVD
No.	Title	Length
1.	"にんじゃりばんばん ふりつけビデオ by きゃりーダンサー" (Ninjya Re Bang Bang dance video by kyary dancers)

== CD artwork personnel ==
Credits adapted from liner notes.

- Steve Nakamura – art director, designer
- Shinji Konishi – hair, make-up
- Kumiko Iijima – stylist
- Takeshi Hanzawa – photographer

== Music video ==
On February 19, 2014; Kyary announced a music video for Yume No Hajima Ring Ring. The theme of the video is "Graduation." The video begins with her walking on her knees, to look like a child, with a polar bear holding her hand. Child Kyary encounters her older self from her initial modeling career. She sheds a tear as her model self walks away. Model-era Kyary walks onward, with the camera following. Model-era Kyary then graduates, receiving a diploma from Ponponpon-era-Kyary. Model-era Kyary then sheds a tear as Ponponpon-era Kyary walks onward, then sits down while kinetic typography is displayed, then walks by numerous props from previous videos. Ponponpon-era Kyary then meets Fashion Monster-era Kyary on a bench. Ponponpon-era Kyary sheds a tear as Fashion Monster-era Kyary leaves, recreates part of the music video for Fashion Monster, then resumes walking onward. Fashion Monster-era Kyary then hits a TV, seeing now-modern Kyary in hakama, dancing with the new background dancers, the polar bear still watching. All of the previous Kyary incarnations call back to her on a Videophone. Kyary then walks for a while with the polar bear, gives it a hug, and then waves goodbye to it. She then walks off alone, as the polar bear begins to cry at her departure.

The video contains numerous references to previous videos of her. Some of them include:

- Costume parts on the background dancers from Mottai Night Land
- The titlecard from Candy Candy
- A slightly modified version of the Ponponpon outfit
- Cardboard cutouts of some of the random bodyparts from Ponponpon
- Twin-Kyary from Candy Candy
- The giant eyeball from "Tsukematsukeru"
- The talking onion from Candy Candy
- The pattern and number 20 from "Furisodeshon"
- A background dancer from "Ninja Re Bang Bang"
- A ghost head from "Mottai Night Land"
- The Fashion Monster outfit
- The fabric from Fashion Monster
- Several musical instruments from Fashion Monster, including the Steampunk Guitar.
- Choreography from Fashion Monster
- Part of the Titlecard from "Invader Invader"

== Charts ==
Chart (2014)	Peak position
Japan (Japan Hot 100)	3
US Hot Singles Sales (Billboard)	12
