= Family Party (song) =

- Regular edition cover

Single by Kyary Pamyu Pamyu

from the album Pika Pika Fantajin
- B-side: "Scanty Skimpy"
- Released: April 16, 2014
- Recorded: 2014
- Genre: J-pop, electropop, chiptune
- Length: 3:35
- Label: Unborde
- Songwriter(s): Yasutaka Nakata
- Producer(s): Yasutaka Nakata

Kyary Pamyu Pamyu singles chronology
"Yume no Hajima Ring Ring" (2014)	"Family Party" (2014)	"Kira Kira Killer" (2014)

Music video
- "Family Party" on YouTube

"Family Party" (ファミリーパーティー, Famirī Pātī) is the ninth physical single by Japanese singer Kyary Pamyu Pamyu. It was released on April 16, 2014, in both regular and limited editions. The A-side is used as the official ending song for the film Eiga Crayon Shin-chan: Gachinko! Gyakushu no Robo To-chan. The music video was released on April 8, 2014.

== Development ==
The single was revealed at the film's press conference in March 2014. Kyary stated that it is her second contribution to the anime series after "Kimi ni 100 Percent" and overall her first original theme song for a film. She said that she owned all volumes of the manga and commented that "I am very happy that I will be in charge of the theme song for my favorite 'Crayon Shin-chan' once again! This time, it's a song with a family theme, so it's a song that the entire family can enjoy together."

Yasutaka Nakata of Capsule stated that the song would be a pop song with a warm and sentimental feel to it and the theme would be "Family Bond". Three official covers were also revealed by Unborde, with the theme of robots. On March 23, 2014, Kyary Pamyu Pamyu first performed the song live on stage in Sydney, Australia, during her second world tour.

== Music video ==
The video starts with Kyary Pamyu Pamyu and her robot opponent being analyzed. Kyary and the robot both pull fighting poses before the referee blows a horn and waves his flag to start the dancing-like competition. Both Kyary and the robot do some moves with two large bubble blower-shaped rods, and the referee pulls out a card with a picture of a piece of cake on it. The competition moves on to using dominoes. The robot puts dominoes next to each other before Kyary topples them and pretends like nothing happened. The robot argues with the referee that it was not his fault but the referee does not allow it. The robot then malfunctions, and it appears that the robot is being controlled by a four-armed robot Kyary. The robot Kyary panics and bangs the control system of the robot, which results in it resuming normal functions. The competition then proceeds with the dancing-like sport, with the referee pulling various poses. They then have a break, and a presentation begins; Kyary, with light blue hair and wearing a tinfoil dress, dances with aliens. The competition resumes; alongside the robot, Kyary puts on a helmet connected to a table while the referee dances on top of the table. The final round of the competition begins and their moves become more serious, and Kyary appears to be winning. She makes a final move to end the game and wins the competition. The referee, the robot and Kyary then jump for joy because of Kyary's victory. Three different outfits are shown in the music video.

== Track listing ==
All tracks are written by Yasutaka Nakata

CD
No.	Title	Length
1.	"Family Party" (ファミリーパーティー Famirī pātī)	3:35
2.	"Scanty Skimpy"	3:38
3.	"Invader Invader" (Extended Mix)	5:28
4.	"Family Party" (Off Vocal)	3:36
5.	"Scanty Skimpy" (Off Vocal)	3:38
Total length:		19:55

DVD A
No.	Title	Length
1.	"キミに100パーセント ふりつけビデオ by クレヨンしんちゃん" (KIMI NI 100 PERCENT DANCE VIDEO BY CRAYON SHINCHAN)

DVD B
No.	Title	Length
1.	"インベーダーインベーダー ふりつけビデオ" (INVADER INVADER DANCE VIDEO)

== Personnel ==
Credits adapted from liner notes.

- Steve Nakamura – art director, designer
- Shinji Konishi – hair, make-up
- Kumiko Iijima – stylist
- Takeshi Hanzawa – photographer
