= Pika Pika Fantajin =

- Standard edition cover

Studio album by Kyary Pamyu Pamyu
- Released: July 9, 2014
- Recorded: October 2013 – May 2014
- Genre: J-pop
- Length: 47:28
- Language: Japanese; English
- Label: Unborde (Warner Music Japan)
- Producer: Yasutaka Nakata

Kyary Pamyu Pamyu chronology
Nanda Collection (2013)	Pika Pika Fantajin (2014)	KPP Best (2016)

Kyary Pamyu Pamyu studio album chronology
Nanda Collection (2013)	Pika Pika Fantajin (2014)	Japamyu (2018)

Singles from Pika Pika Fantajin
- 1. "Mottai Night Land" Released: November 6, 2013; 2. "Yume no Hajima Ring Ring" Released: February 26, 2014; 3. "Family Party" Released: April 16, 2014; 4. "Kira Kira Killer" Released: June 11, 2014 (limited edition single and digital download)

Alternate cover
- Limited edition CD+DVD version A

Alternative cover
- Limited edition CD+DVD version B

Pika Pika Fantajin (ピカピカふぁんたじん, PikaPika Fantajin; lit. "Sparkling Fantasy Person") is the third studio album by Japanese singer Kyary Pamyu Pamyu, officially released on July 9, 2014. The album's official title is a portmanteau of the words "fantasy" and "person" (jin), as officially referenced to the album covers. The songs "Slowmo", from single "Yume no Hajima Ring Ring", and "Scanty Skimpy", from single "Family Party", were not included in the final track listing. Rhino Entertainment/Warner released the Vinyl LP Picture Disc version on January 13, 2015 in the USA. "Kira Kira Killer" and "Koi Koi Koi" were used in the soundtrack for the 2016 motion picture Sing (but was not released on the Sing: Original Motion Picture Soundtrack).

== Background ==
In September 2013, Kyary announced a second world tour titled Nanda Collection World Tour and a new single "Mottai Night Land" was released in late October and received positive reviews from Western media outlets. Mottai Night Land was released on November 6. The world tour visited the United States, Canada, Australia, England, France, Germany, Taiwan, Thailand, Singapore, Hong Kong, and Kyary's native Japan, lasting from February until June 2014. With her second world tour, Kyary continued to gain more international attention. In May, Dazed & Confused announced that Kyary was working with international musicians SOPHIE and Yelle on new upcoming music. Kyary announced at her ZEPP Tokyo concert that she will be releasing her 3rd full album titled Pika Pika Fantajin (ピカピカふぁんたじん, Pikapika Fantajin) on July 9, 2014. The album was fully released on July 9, 2014 in digital download and the CD: in normal edition and Type A and B limited edition, were released a day after.

All her singles are featured on the new album except for the b-side songs "Slow Mo" and "Scanty Skimpy", which were omitted. The new song, "Ring a Bell" is Pamyu Pamyu's first full-length English song as well.

== Reception ==
Professional ratings
Review scores
Source	Rating
Pitchfork Media	6.7/10
Spin	7/10
Sputnikmusic	3.5/5
Tiny Mix Tapes	4.5/5 stars

Pika Pika Fantajin received favorable reviews from music critics. Robert Lowe from Sputnikmusic gave it a three-and-a-half out of five. He said "Kyary Pamyu Pamyu's fourth release in four years Pikapika Fantajin has the sensational pop star rattling albums off like a Japanese version of The Smiths, but quantity does not always equal quality as Kyary's last two records show a glaring inconsistency in quality." He concluded saying "The six or so sing-along/dance friendly top notch J-pop songs however are strong enough to warrant replaying Pikapika Fantajin all summer long, as long as you're willing to skip tracks somewhat often." Patrick St. Michel from Pitchfork Media gave it a 6.7 out of 10. He said "Fantajin stumbles at times and ultimately feels like a transitional album, but its mix of new sonic twists and straight-up pop delicacies make for good listen overall, underscoring the fact that Kyary Pamyu Pamyu is more than a YouTube oddity. And more people are picking up on that: Kyary is currently working with wonky producer Sophie and French pop act Yelle on new music, an intriguing development in her still-young career." Maura Johnston of Spin gave the album a 7 out of 10 in her review.

== Track listing ==
All tracks are written by Yasutaka Nakata.

No.	Title	Length
1.	"Pika Pika Fantajin" (ピカピカふぁんたじん)	1:12
2.	"Kira Kira Killer" (きらきらキラー)	4:17
3.	"Yume no Hajima Ring Ring (album mix)" (ゆめのはじまりんりん -album mix-)	4:04
4.	"Mottai Night Land" (もったいないとらんど)	4:01
5.	"Serious Hitomi" (シリアスひとみ)	5:18
6.	"do do pi do" (Capsule cover)	4:39
7.	"Family Party (album mix)" (ファミリーパーティー -album mix-)	3:39
8.	"Ring a Bell"	4:09
9.	"Tokyo Highway" (トーキョーハイウェイ)	5:09
10.	"Koi Koi Koi" (こいこいこい)	3:17
11.	"Sungoi Aura (album mix)" (すんごいオーラ -album mix-)	3:40
12.	"Explorer" (エクスプローラー)	4:03
Total length:		47:28

Limited edition bonus DVD (version A)
No.	Title	Length
1.	"Nanda Collection World Tour 2014 Official Documentary Episode 1"

Limited edition bonus DVD (version B)
No.	Title	Length
1.	"Nanda Collection World Tour 2014 Official Documentary Episode 2"

== Personnel ==
Credits adapted from liner notes and AllMusic.

- capsule – primary artist
- Takeshi Hanzawa – photography
- Taku Hatao – retouching
- *Kumiko Iijima – stylist
- Tsuyoshi Ishii – producer
- Kei Ishizaka – executive producer
- Ayano Ishizaki – A&R
- Harumi Ito – A&R
- Kazu Kobayashi – executive producer
- Shinji Konishi – hair, make-up
- Yuri Kudo – staff
- Masayo Kuroda – production coordination
- Kyary Pamyu Pamyu – primary artist
- Tadashi Matsuyama – production coordination
- Keisuke Nagamine – prop design
- Yusuke Nakagawa – executive producer
- Steve Nakamura – art direction, designer
- Masahiro Nakawaki – supervisor
- Atsushi Suzuki – supervisor
- Shuji Utsumi – executive producer
- Yasutaka Nakata – arranger, engineer, mastering, mixing, primary artist, producer
- Keiko Yuyama – English translations

== Charts ==
=== Oricon ===
Oricon Chart	Peak	Debut sales	Sales total	Certification
Daily Albums Chart	1	22,528	72,945	Gold
Weekly Albums Chart	1	47,695	72,945	Gold
Monthly Albums Chart	7	65,493	72,945	Gold
Yearly Albums Chart	61	72,945	72,945	Gold
