= Ai wa Itsumo Kimi no Naka ni / Futsū, Idol 10nen Yatterannai Desho!? =

Single by Berryz Kobo

from the album Kanjuku Berryz Kobo The Final Completion Box
- Released: June 4, 2014
- Recorded: 2014
- Genre: J-pop, pop
- Label: Piccolo Town
- Songwriter: Tsunku
- Producer: Tsunku

Berryz Kobo singles chronology
"Otona na no yo! / 1oku 3zenman Sō Diet Ōkoku" (2014)	"Ai wa Itsumo Kimi no Naka ni / Futsū, Idol 10nen Yatterannai Desho!?" (2014)	"Romance o Katatte / Towa no Uta" (2014)

Music videos
- "Ai wa Itsumo Kimi no Naka ni" on YouTube
- "Futsū, Idol 10nen Yatterannai Desho!?" on YouTube

"Ai wa Itsumo Kimi no Naka ni / Futsū, Idol 10nen Yatterannai Desho!?" (愛はいつも君の中に／普通、アイドル10年やってらんないでしょ！？) is the 35th single by Japanese idol group Berryz Kobo, released in Japan on June 4, 2014.

The physical CD single debuted at 4th place in the Japanese Oricon weekly singles chart.

== Charts ==
Chart (2014)	Peak position
Japan (Oricon Daily Singles Chart)	3
Japan (Oricon Weekly Singles Chart)	4
