= Mottainai =

Japanese term translates as "What a waste!"

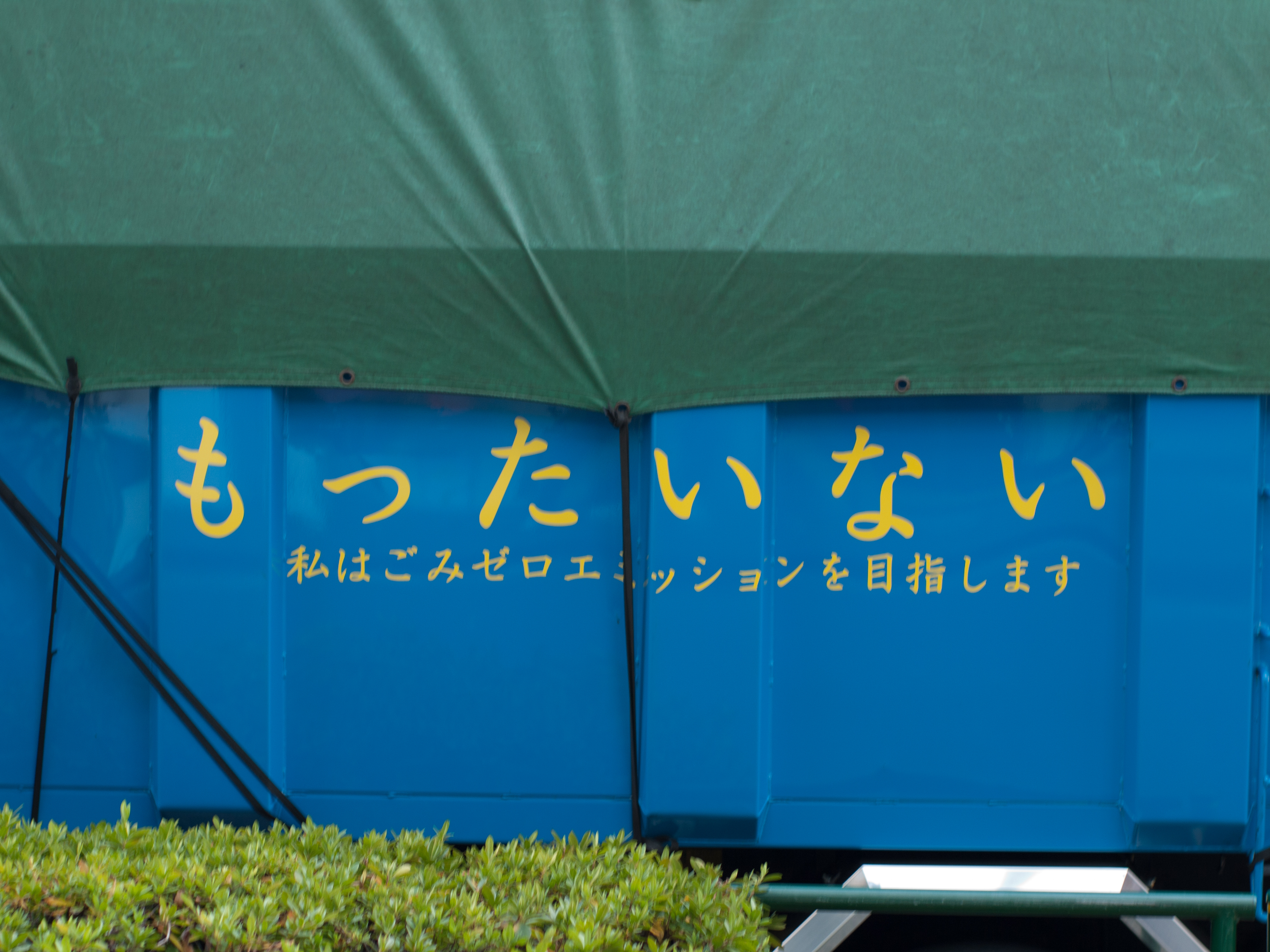
Mottainai written on a truck, followed by the sentence "I strive towards zero emission"

Mottainai (Japanese: もったいない or 勿体無い) is a Japanese phrase conveying a sense of regret over waste, or to state that one does not deserve something because it is too good. The term can be translated to English as "What a waste!" or the old saying, "Waste not, want not."

== History ==
An archaic Japanese dictionary dates the use of the term "mottainai" back to the 13th century. Two frequently-cited early examples of usages of mottainashi, given in both Kōjien and Daigenkai, are the Genpei Jōsuiki and the Taiheiki.

A form of the word, motaina (モタイナ) appears in the late-14th or early-15th century Noh play Aritōshi, apparently in a sense close to (1).

The 18th-century Kokugaku philologist Motoori Norinaga, in the preface to his 1798 treatise Tamaarare ('Ice Crystals (like) Jewels'; 玉あられ) designed to stir people up from their sleepy acquiescence in acquired customs that were not authentically native, and was critical of the use of the word to express gratitude.

He felt its use for such a purpose (along with those of katajikenashi and osoreōi) was vitiated by its ultimate derivation from imitating forms of Chinese rhetoric and greetings.

In his 1934 essay Nihon-seishin to Bukkyō, the Buddhologist Katō Totsudō (加藤咄堂; 1870-1949) included the "aversion to wastefulness" (mottainai) in a putative series of what he considered to be "core Japanese personality traits".

In December 2025, Mottainai was one of the 11 Japanese words added to the Oxford English Dictionary.

== Etymology ==
Mottai itself is a noun appearing as such in, for example, the dictionary Gagaku-shū, which dates to 1444. Daigenkai gives buttai as an alternate reading of the word, and it appears written with the kanji 勿躰, 物體, 勿體, 物体, or 勿体.

It means (i) the shape/form of a thing or (ii) something that is, or the fact of being, impressive or imposing (モノモノシキコト; monomonoshiki koto).

The compound that is pronounced as mottai in Japanese appears in Sino-Japanese dictionaries as a Chinese word in a sense similar to (ii), but mottainashi does not, as it is an indigenous Japanese word.

The word nai in mottainai resembles a Japanese negative ("there is no mottai"), but may have originally been used as an emphatic ("tremendous mottai").

== Definition ==
Kōjien, widely considered the most authoritative Japanese dictionary, lists three definitions for the word mottainai (classical Japanese terminal form mottainashi):

1. inexpedient or reprehensible towards a god, buddha, noble or the like
2. awe-inspiring and unmerited/undeserved, used to express thanks
3. an expression of regret at the full value of something not being put to good use. In contemporary Japanese, mottainai is most commonly used to indicate that something is being discarded needlessly, or to express regret at such a fact.

Kōhei Hasegawa, former professor of Nagano University, noted that the definition (3) in Kōjien was the one used most frequently by modern Japanese. The second sense is seen in Japanese newspapers when they refer to members of the imperial family as having been present at such-and-such an event, not necessarily implying wastefulness but rather gratitude or awe. Daigenkai, another Japanese dictionary, gives a similar ordering of these definitions.

Hasegawa traces this increase in the frequency of meaning (3) to a historical semantic shift in which the original meaning, meaning (1), became less prominent. Citing the Kyoto University Japanese literature scholar Kōshin Noma,

Hasegawa states that the word originated as slang in the Kamakura period, and that by the mid 15th century had perhaps already acquired the meanings of (2) and (3).

== Cultural influence ==
=== Modern Japanese environmentalism ===
Japanese environmentalists have used the term to encourage people to "reduce, reuse and recycle".

In November 2002, the English-language, Japan-based magazine Look Japan ran a cover story entitled "Restyling Japan: Revival of the 'Mottainai' Spirit", documenting the motivation amongst volunteers in a "toy hospital" in Japan to "develop in children the habit of looking after their possessions", the re-emergence of repair shops specializing in repairing household appliances or children's clothes, the recycling of PET bottles and other materials, the collection of waste edible oil, and more generally the efforts to stop the trend of throwing away everything that can no longer be used, i.e. the efforts of reviving "the spirit of mottainai".

The "Mottainai Spirit" is seen as human resources and nature surrounding us. In that context, Hitoshi Chiba, the author, described mottainai as follows:

We often hear in Japan the expression 'mottainai', which loosely means 'wasteful' but in its full sense conveys a feeling of awe and appreciation for the gifts of nature or the sincere conduct of other people. There is a trait among Japanese people to try to use something for its entire effective life or continue to use it by repairing it. In this caring culture, people will endeavor to find new homes for possessions they no longer need. The 'mottainai' principle extends to the dinner table, where many consider it rude to leave even a single grain of rice in the bowl. The concern is that this traditional trait may be lost.

In a 2014 paper on an apparent increase in interest in the idea of mottainai in early 21st-century Japan, historian Eiko Maruko Siniawer summarized the views of several Japanese writers who claimed that mottainai was a specifically Buddhist concept.

She also cited a number of views of Japanese authors who believed that it was a uniquely Japanese "contribution to the world", whose views she characterized as mostly being "deeply rooted in cultural generalizations, essentialisms, and disdainful comparisons between countries".

=== Use by Wangari Maathai ===
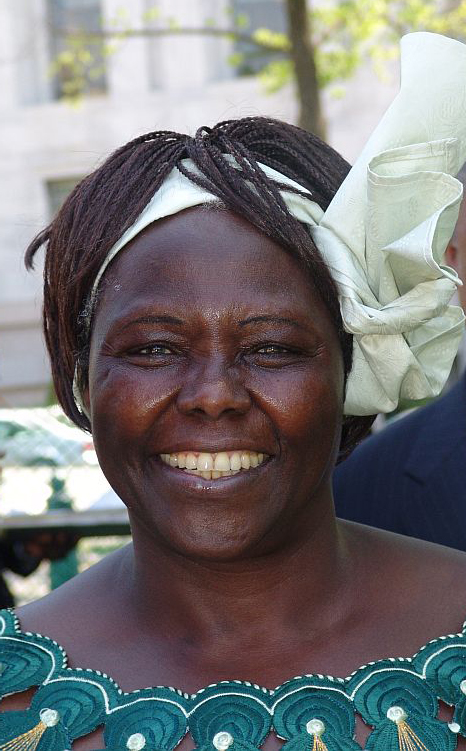
Nobel Prize winner Wangari Maathai has used the word mottainai in an environmental protection campaign.

At a session of the United Nations, Kenyan environmentalist Wangari Maathai introduced the word mottainai as a slogan for environmental protection.

According to Mizue Sasaki,

Dr. Maathai, brandishing a t-shirt emblazoned with the word MOTTAINAI, explained that the meaning of the term mottainai encompasses the four Rs of reduce, reuse, recycle and repair ... [and] made the case that we should all use limited resources effectively and share them fairly if we are to avert wars arising from disputes over natural resources.

At the 2009 United Nations Summit on Climate Change, she said,

Even at personal level, we can all reduce, re-use and recycle, what is embraced as Mottainai in Japan, a concept that also calls us to express gratitude, to respect and to avoid wastage.

== See also ==
- Affluenza
- Anti-consumerism
- Bal tashchit
- Conspicuous consumption
- Freeganism
- Frugality
- Kintsugi – Japanese pottery repair method with gold lacquer
- Mottainai Grandma
- "Mottai Night Land", a Kyary Pamyu Pamyu song
- Muda, mura and muri, three types of waste in lean manufacturing
- Planned obsolescence
- Simple living
