= Kira Kira Killer =

Single by Kyary Pamyu Pamyu

from the album Pika Pika Fantajin
- Released: June 11, 2014
- Recorded: 2013–2014
- Genre: J-pop, technopop
- Length: 4:16
- Label: Unborde
- Songwriter: Yasutaka Nakata
- Producer: Yasutaka Nakata

Kyary Pamyu Pamyu singles chronology
"Family Party" (2014)	"Kira Kira Killer" (2014)	"Mondai Girl" (2015)

"Kira Kira Killer" (きらきらキラー, Kira Kira Kirā; lit. "Glitter Killer") is the first limited run single by Japanese singer Kyary Pamyu Pamyu. It was released on June 11, 2014.

The song (along with "Ninja Re Bang Bang" and "Koi Koi Koi") was featured in the 2016 American animated film Sing during which five red panda girls perform the song as an audition.

== Release details ==
The physical CD single is a limited edition run of only 7,777 copies, which come with a number of special goods (a glittery sticker featuring the cover artwork, signed mini-poster, and vinyl bag containing the single), as well as a code for entry into a raffle (for residents of Japan only) with the chance to win one of a number of additional special goods, including:

- a sparkly ‘Kirakira’ hair tie (777 people only)
- a ‘pierced by an arrow’ T-shirt that matches the PV for Kirakira Killer (777 people only)
- a mask to match Kyary's in the PV for Kirakira Killer (777 people only)
- one of Kyary's personal things (1 person only)

== Track listing ==
All tracks are written by Yasutaka Nakata.

CD
No.	Title	Length
1.	"Kira Kira Killer" (きらきらキラー Kirakira kirā)	4:16
2.	"Kira Kira Killer" (Extended Mix)	5:11
Total length:		9:27

== CD artwork personnel ==
Credits adapted from liner notes.

- Steve Nakamura – art director, designer
- Shinji Konishi – hair, make-up
- Kumiko Iijima – stylist
- Takeshi Hanzawa – photographer

== Music video ==
=== Description ===
The video starts with an arrow with a heart-shaped arrow-head flying in a sparkling background. The arrow pierces through Kyary's chest. She is completely surprised and dies on the spot. Her soul leaves her motionless body through an out of body experience and she is taken to the afterlife. Kyary then explores the area and a guardian appears. The guardian demonstrates his power to Kyary by showing her he is both in front of her as well as turning into a giant and holding her in his hand. She is very surprised and removes her mask. The next scene shows Kyary dancing around. Next, she is walking on a surface with a globe design supported by three elephants on a turtle. The guardian and Kyary stare at an apple falling off a tree. When the apple falls, it is shown that they are standing on a globe shaped like an apple. A snake twisting around the apple carries Kyary away and swallows her. She then slides out of the snake's body. The guardian and Kyary then look at a ball bouncing back and forth. She then does some calculations and realizes that E=mc^2. The guardian calls forth lightning, and a hoverboard is created where the lightning hits the ground. Kyary steps on the hoverboard then rides through a vortex with the guardian. As she hops off, sparkling lights appear and her outfit changes from dark to a white and more feminine outfit. She then jumps for joy on a lotus. Her soul returns to her body. In the end, Kyary is shown wielding the bow and arrow that pierced her heart in the beginning. Due to intense movement of scenario and involving song, some people reported EMDR side effects, including a sense of discomfort after repeated exposure.

=== Creation ===
The general plot of the video clip can be described as Kyary being struck down by an arrow of love, having an out of body experience, then achieving enlightenment through her time in the world of death, all in typical Kyary humor.

Video clip director Jun Tamukai (田向潤) from the outstart floated the idea "Let's have Kyary die", which Kyary supported saying she'd like to do something around dark fantasy. The pre-plot of the video clip became "Kyary learns the secret of the world in the afterlife". Kyary commented "I wanted to have a theme that turns around the theme of glittery kawaii pop, and show a darker fantasy theme including a glittery assassin" (kirakira is a phenomimetic expression for glitter or glisten, kiraa is the word 'killer' assimilated into Japanese). The first part of the song shows a verse/bridge structure with religious and spiritual themes, such as skeletons, eggs, whereas the second part is more anchored in science demonstrating the law of gravity and relativity.

Scrupulously following schedule, the video clip was shot during two days in May 2014. The two outfits that Kyary wears took two weeks to make. The first costume is eerie and ominous, a costume with a dark theme that Kyary didn't show until that point. The lumpy styrene on the skirt and arms shaped like rain clouds, with a contrastive silvery mask and body protection, shows Kyary fighting in the other world. The outfit she wears in the conclusion, shows "Kyary Pamyu Pamyu having achieved enlightenment - Evolution".

To express the movement and franticness of the music, video-clip director Jun Tamukai used the 4D Views technology. This special technology scans and records the movements of the actor at the millisecond scale, and enables the replacement of complex camera work involving cranes with a computer rendering. However, to ensure image quality, the director only used this technology for far away shots, and actual actor footage for close-ups. Special care had to be taken to hide the transition between the two.

The scene where Kyary stands in front of a row of speakers singing her heart out is an hommage to Asian Kung Fu Generation's singer Masafumi Gotoh (後藤 正文) and the music video for their song Rewrite. During the filming, the staff shouted her to "Sing it like Gottchi!".

The stylist for the music video was Iijima Kumiko (飯嶋久美子).

=== Themes ===
In an interview, video clip director Jun Tamukai said there is no need to explain the themes and construction for the clip, since it is possible to figure out most of them by oneself. The list could therefore be considered a spoiler and no replacement for personal interpretation.
