= Mottai Night Land =

- Regular Edition cover

Single by Kyary Pamyu Pamyu

from the album Pika Pika Fantajin
- B-side: "Sungoi Aura"
- Released: November 6, 2013
- Recorded: 2013
- Genre: Bubblegum pop, J-Pop
- Length: 4:01
- Label: Unborde
- Songwriter: Yasutaka Nakata
- Producer: Yasutaka Nakata

Kyary Pamyu Pamyu singles chronology
"Invader Invader" (2013)	"Mottai Night Land" (2013)	"Yume No Hajima-Ring Ring" (2014)

Music video
- "Mottai Night Land" on YouTube

"Mottai Night Land" (もったいないとらんど, Mottai Naito Rando; "Wasteful Night Land") is the seventh physical single by J-pop artist Kyary Pamyu Pamyu, released on November 6, 2013, in both regular and limited editions. The song is used for the Japanese Cellphone company au's "Smart Value" commercials, in which she is featured as a guest star. The B-Side "Sungoi Aura" is used for Sunstar's "Ora 2" Toothpaste commercials.

The single's title is a mixture of the Japanese word mottainai, usually meaning wasteful but precious here, and the phrase Night Land. The music video was released on 23 October 2013.

== Development ==
The song was first used on the latest au commercial aired in October, featuring Kyary dancing with the Mottainai Ghosts. Composer and Producer Yasutaka Nakata of Capsule stated that the song is made for the commercial itself, on which the song is full of dreams and wishes.

Both covers for the single will reflect the name and theme on which it is based. The regular edition will be themed with "Wasteful Fantasy", depicting Kyary transforming into an animal while surrounded with fruits and vegetables. The limited-edition version will have an "Incredible Fantasy" theme, which has Kyary wearing a wig with apple and orange skins, showing off its "Mottainai" nature.

== Track listing ==
All tracks are written by Yasutaka Nakata.

CD
No.	Title	Length
1.	"Mottai Night Land" (もったいないとらんど Mottai Naito Rando; lit. "Wasteful Night Land")	4:01
2.	"Sungoi Aura" (すんごいオーラ Sungoi Ōra; lit. "Awesome Aura")	2:56
3.	"Ninja Re Bang Bang" (extended mix)	5:43
4.	"Mottai Night Land" (instrumental)	4:01
5.	"Sungoi Aura" (instrumental)	2:56
Total length:		19:37

DVD
No.	Title	Length
1.	"もったいないとらんど ふりつけビデオ by きゃりーダンサー" (Mottai Night Land dance video by kyary dancers)

== Reception ==
The music video was highly praised by critics. Oyster wrote about the video, "Probably just cease whatever you're doing now, and watch this, for the simple fact that it's superior." The Fader wrote of the video, "“Mottai Night Land” is a tour de force, featuring a catchy hook, a dance with the moon, an anime segment and oiled-up bikini dancers." Spin write, "... it's a thing to behold. The ever-kawaii singer dances with a moon man, eats a muffin man's head, and snoozes with a bubble coming out of her face in a brightly colored, constantly eye-popping clip... The overall effect is something like the difference between someone telling you their crazy dream and actually inviting you into it." The music video's visual design is also heavily influenced by Tim Burton's The Nightmare Before Christmas.

== Personnel ==
Credits adapted from liner notes.

- Steve Nakamura – art director, designer
- Shinji Konishi – hair, make-up
- Takeshi Hanzawa – photographer
- Kumiko Iijima – stylist
